= List of breweries in Canada =

This is an incomplete list (10+ years old) of many of the breweries in Canada. Breweries are not included in this list unless the individual brewery is notable or contains significance to Canadian culture and history.

== Breweries in Canada ==
Name	Province/Territory	City	Founded	Notes	Ref
Agassiz Brewing	Manitoba	Winnipeg	1998	Closed in 2010	
All or Nothing Brewhouse	Ontario	Oshawa	2014		
Amsterdam Brewing Company	Ontario	Toronto	1986		
La Barberie	Quebec	Quebec City	1995		
Beau's All Natural Brewing Company	Ontario	Vankleek Hill	2006		
Belgh Brasse	Quebec	Amos	1999		
Big Rock Brewery	Alberta	Calgary	1985		
La Brasserie du Roi (The King's Brewery)	Quebec	Quebec City	1668	Closed in 1674; founded by Jean Talon. Talon's original 1668 brewery building burned down in 1713.	
Les Brasseurs du Nord	Quebec	Blainville	1987		
Les Brasseurs RJ	Quebec	Montreal	1998		
Waterloo Brewing Company, formerly known as Brick Brewing Company	Ontario	Kitchener	1984		
Cameron's Brewing Company	Ontario	Oakville	1997		
Carling Brewery	Ontario	London	1840	Originating in 1840 as a small brewing operation in London, Ontario, Carling became a national and eventually a global brand, particularly popular in the UK and South Africa. Carling merged with the Brewing Corporation of Ontario (BCO) in 1930. BCO launched Carling in the US in 1932, and acquired Toronto's O'Keefe Brewery in 1934. BCO became Canadian Breweries (CBL) in 1937. Carling brands entered the UK market in 1952. After CBL was sold to Rothmans in 1969, it was renamed Carling O'Keefe in 1973. In 1989, Carling O'Keefe merged with Molson, which merged in 2005 with Coors to form Molson Coors Brewing Company. Molson Coors has continued to brew and sell Carling Black Label across Canada.	
Carling O'Keefe	Ontario	Toronto	1930	Originally formed as Brewing Corporation of Ontario, became Canadian Breweries in 1936. One of the "Big Three" of Canadian brewing formed by buying or merging smaller competitors. Became Carling O'Keefe in 1973. Merged with Molson in 1989	
Central City Brewers & Distillers	British Columbia	Surrey	2003		
Le Cheval Blanc	Quebec	Montreal	1986	Merged in 1998 to form Les Brasseurs RJ	
Collective Arts Brewing	Ontario	Hamilton			
Columbia Brewery	British Columbia	Creston	1898	Purchased by Labatt in 1974	
Cool Beer Brewing Company	Ontario	Etobicoke	1997		
Creemore Springs	Ontario	Creemore	1987	Acquired by Molson in 2005	
Dominion Brewery	Ontario	Toronto	1878	Acquired by Canadian Breweries in 1930, closed in 1936	
Dow Breweries	Quebec	Quebec City	1790	Originally Dunn Brewery, renamed William Dow & Co. on death of Thomas Dunn. Combines with Williams to become National Breweries in 1909. The National Breweries Ltd. building was constructed in 1919 with additions in 1924. Acquired by Canadian Breweries in 1952, brands discontinued in 1997	
F&M Brewery	Ontario	Guelph	1995	Closed in 2018	
Farmery Estate Brewery	Manitoba	Neepawa	2012		
Formosa Springs Brewery	Ontario	Formosa	1994	various owners, independent as of May 2018	
Fort Garry Brewing Company	Manitoba	Winnipeg	1994		
Granville Island Brewing	British Columbia	Vancouver	1984	Purchased by Molson in 2009.	
Great Lakes Brewery	Ontario	Toronto	1987		
Great Western Brewing Company	Saskatchewan	Saskatoon	1989	Founded in 1927 as Hub City Brewing Company	
Half Pints Brewing Company	Manitoba	Winnipeg	2006		
Hamilton's Kent Brewery	Ontario	London	1859	Named after, and imported its hops from, the county of Kent in England. Closed in 1917.	
Hogsback Brewing Company	Ontario	Ottawa	2010	Closed in 2018	
Alexander Keith's Brewery	Nova Scotia	Halifax	1820	Sold to Oland Brewery in 1928, now owned by Anheuser-Busch InBev. The current ironstone brewery building was built in 1837.	
King Brewery	Ontario	Nobleton	2002		
Labatt Brewing Company	Ontario	London	1847	Purchased by Interbrew in 1995, now owned by Anheuser-Busch InBev	
Lakeport Brewing Company	Ontario	Hamilton	1992	Taken over by Labatt in 2007	
Lighthouse Brewing Company	British Columbia	Esquimalt	1998		
McAuslan Brewing	Quebec	Montreal	1989	Sold to Les Brasseurs RJ in 2013	
Mill Street Brewery	Ontario	Toronto	2002	Sold to Labatt Brewing Company in 2015	
Molson Brewery	Quebec	Montréal	1786	Merged with Coors in 2005 to form Molson Coors Brewing Company. The oldest extant building from the original Molson brewery complex was built in stone in 1913.	
Moosehead Breweries	New Brunswick	Saint John	1867	Oldest and largest independent brewery in Canada.	
Mt. Begbie Brewing Company	British Columbia	Revelstoke	1996		
Muskoka Cottage Brewery	Ontario	Bracebridge	1996		
Nelson Brewing Company	British Columbia	Nelson	1991		
Neustadt Springs Brewery	Ontario	Neustadt	1997	Originally founded by Henry Huether in 1859 as the Crystal Springs Brewery. Closed in 1916 due to prohibition. Reopened in 1997 as Neustadt Springs Brewery.	
Northern Breweries	Ontario	Sudbury	1907	Closed in 2006	
O'Brien Brewing and Malting Company	Yukon	Klondike City	1904	Closed in 1919	
Oland Brewery	Nova Scotia	Halifax	1907	Sold to Labatt Brewing Company in 1971	
Paddock Wood Brewing Company	Saskatchewan	Saskatoon	2004		
Parallel 49 Brewing Company	British Columbia	Vancouver	2012		
Picaroons Traditional Ales	New Brunswick	Fredericton; Saint John	1995	Still operating	
Pump House Brewery	New Brunswick	Moncton	1999	Famous for its Blueberry Ale and Crafty Radler, Pump House was named Canadian Brewery of the Year in 2005	
Louis Prud'homme's brewery	Quebec	Montreal	1650	Closed; just outside the walls of Fort Ville-Marie (early Montréal)	
Quidi Vidi Brewing Company	Newfoundland & Labrador	St. John's	1996	Still operating	
Russell Brewing Company	British Columbia	Surrey	1995		
Shaftebury Brewing Company	British Columbia	Vancouver	1986		
Sleeman Breweries	Ontario	Guelph	1988	Re-establishment of family brewer dating back to 1830s. Original Sleemans during prohibition; re-established in 1988; Sold to Sapporo Brewery in 2006	
Steam Whistle Brewing	Ontario	Toronto	2000		
Steamworks Brewing Company	British Columbia	Vancouver	1995		
Steelback Brewery	Ontario	Tiverton	2004	Closed in 2010	
Unibroue	Quebec	Chambly	1991	Sold to Sleeman Breweries in 2004, now owned by Sapporo Brewery	
Upper Canada Brewing Company	Ontario	Guelph	1985	Acquired by Sleeman Breweries in 1998	
Walkerville Brewing Company	Ontario	Windsor	1998	Closed in 2007	
Wellington Brewery	Ontario	Guelph	1985		
Wild Rose Brewery	Alberta	Calgary	1996	Sold to Sleeman Breweries in 2019	
Yukon Brewing Company	Yukon	Whitehorse	1997		

== See also ==
- Beer and breweries by region
- Beer in Canada
- Beer in Quebec
- Canadian Breweries
- List of breweries in British Columbia
- List of breweries, wineries, and distilleries in Manitoba
- List of breweries in Quebec
