= List of breweries in British Columbia =

The following is a list of breweries in British Columbia.

== Breweries ==
Company	Founded	Municipality	Region	Refs
The 101 Brewhouse & Distillery	2017	Gibsons	Sunshine Coast	
3 Dogs Brewing	2017	White Rock	Lower Mainland	
33 Acres Brewing Co.	2013	Vancouver	Lower Mainland	
4 Mile Brewing Co.	2014	View Royal	Vancouver Island	
A-Frame Brewing Co.	2016	Squamish	Sea-to-Sky	
Abandoned Rail Brewing Co.	2022	Penticton	Okanagan	
Ace Brewing Company	2019	Courtenay	Vancouver Island	
Alberni Brewing Co.	2021	Port Alberni	Vancouver Island	
Andina Brewing Company	2017	Vancouver	Lower Mainland	
Angry Hen Brewing Co.	2017	Kaslo	Kootenays	
Another Beer Company	2019	New Westminster	Lower Mainland	
Arrowhead Brewing Company	2012	Invermere	Kootenays	
Backcountry Brewing	2017	Squamish	Sea-to-Sky	
Backroads Brewing Co.	2017	Nelson	Kootenays	
Bad Dog Brewing Company	2017	Sooke	Vancouver Island	
Barkerville Brewing Co.	2013	Quesnel	Cariboo	
Barn Owl Brewing Co.	2019	Kelowna	Okanagan	
Barnside Brewing Co	2020	Delta	Lower Mainland	
Batch 44 Brewery	2020	Sechelt	Sunshine Coast	
Bayview Brewing Company	2022	Ladysmith	Vancouver Island	
Beach Fire Brewing	2015	Campbell River	Vancouver Island	
Beacon Brewing	2021	Sidney	Vancouver Island	
Beard's Brewing Co.	2017	Fort St. John	Peace River	
The Beer Farmers	2018	Pemberton	Sea-to-Sky	
Beere Brewing Company	2017	North Vancouver	Lower Mainland	
Big Bear Brewery	2019	Kelowna	Okanagan	
Black Kettle Brewing Co.	2014	North Vancouver	Lower Mainland	
BNA Brewing Co.	2015	Kelowna	Okanagan	
Bomber Brewing	2014	Vancouver	Lower Mainland	
Bowen Island Brewing Co.	1994	Vancouver	Lower Mainland	
Braggot Brewing	2022	North Vancouver	Lower Mainland	
Brassneck Brewery	2013	Vancouver	Lower Mainland	
Brave Brewing Co.	2022	Port Moody	Lower Mainland	
Brewhall Beer Co.	2018	Vancouver	Lower Mainland	
Brewing August	2022	Vancouver	Lower Mainland	
Bricklayer Brewing	2020	Chilliwack	Lower Mainland	
Bridge Brewing Company	2012	North Vancouver	Lower Mainland	
Bright Eye Brewing	2019	Kamloops	Southern Interior	
Britannia Brewing Co.	2016	Richmond	Lower Mainland	
Brookswood Brewing Co.	2022	Langley	Lower Mainland	
Bulkley Valley Brewery	2018	Smithers	North Coast	
Camp Beer Co.	2019	Langley	Lower Mainland	
Cannery Brewing	2001	Penticton	Okanagan	
Canoe Brewpub	1996	Victoria	Vancouver Island	
Canuck Empire Brewing Co.	2014	Abbotsford	Lower Mainland	
Category 12 Brewing	2014	Saanichton	Vancouver Island	
Central City Brewers & Distillers	2003	Surrey	Lower Mainland	
Cliffside Brewing Co.	2019	Nanaimo	Vancouver Island	
Coast Mountain Brewing Co.	2016	Whistler	Sea-to-Sky	
Columbia Brewery	1898	Creston	Kootenays	
Container Brewing	2018	Vancouver	Lower Mainland	
Copper Brewing Co.	2019	Kelowna	Okanagan	
Craig Street Brewing Co.	2006	Duncan	Vancouver Island	
Crannóg Ales	2000	Sorrento	Southern Interior	
CrossRoads Brewing	2017	Prince George	Northern Interior	
Cumberland Brewing Co.	2014	Cumberland	Vancouver Island	
Dageraad Brewing	2014	Burnaby	Lower Mainland	
Dead Frog Brewery	2007	Langley	Lower Mainland	
Deep Cove Brewers and Distillers	2013	North Vancouver	Lower Mainland	
Detonate Brewing	2017	Summerland	Okanagan	
Devils' Bath Brewing Co.	2021	Port McNeill	Vancouver Island	
Dog Mountain Brewing	2019	Port Alberni	Vancouver Island	
Dogwood Brewing	2015	Vancouver	Lower Mainland	
Driftwood Brewing	2008	Victoria	Vancouver Island	
East Van Brewing Company	2017	Vancouver	Lower Mainland	
Electric Bicycle Brewing	2018	Vancouver	Lower Mainland	
Empty Keg Brew House	2019	Merritt	Southern Interior	
Erie Creek Brewing Co.	2020	Salmo	Kootenays	
Faculty Brewing Co.	2016	Vancouver	Lower Mainland	
Farm Country Brewing	2019	Langley	Lower Mainland	
Farmhouse Brewing Co.	2020	Chilliwack	Lower Mainland	
Fern & Cedar Brewing Company	2021	Qualicum Beach	Vancouver Island	
Fernie Brewing Co.	2003	Fernie	Kootenays	
Field House Brewing Co.	2015	Abbotsford	Lower Mainland	
Firehall Brewery	2011	Oliver	Okanagan	
Fisher Peak Brewing Co.	2013	Cranbrook	Kootenays	
Five Roads Brewing Co.	2019	Langley	Lower Mainland	
Foamers' Folly Brewing Co.	2015	Pitt Meadows	Lower Mainland	
Four Winds Brewing Co.	2013	Delta	Lower Mainland	
Fox Mountain Brewing Co.	2020	Williams Lake	Cariboo	
Fraser Mills Fermentation Co.	2019	Port Moody	Lower Mainland	
Fuggles Beer	2015	Richmond	Lower Mainland	
Galaxie Craft Brewhouse	2021	White Rock	Lower Mainland	
Giant's Head Brewing	2021	Summerland	Okanagan	
Gladstone Brewing Company	2015	Courtenay	Vancouver Island	
Granville Island Brewing	1984	Vancouver	Lower Mainland	
Grey Fox Brewing	2022	Kelowna	Okanagan	
Grist & Mash Brewery	2021	Kimberley	Kootenays	
Hastings Mill Brewing Co.	2006	Vancouver	Lower Mainland	
Herald Street Brew Works	2020	Victoria	Vancouver Island	
High Mountain Brewing Company	1996	Whistler	Sea-to-Sky	
Highway 97 Brewery	2016	Penticton	Okanagan	
Hornby Island Brewing Company	2018	Hornby Island	Gulf Islands	
House of Funk Brewing	2019	North Vancouver	Lower Mainland	
Howe Sound Brewing	1996	Squamish	Sea-to-Sky	
Howl Brewing	2018	North Saanich	Vancouver Island	
Hoyne Brewing Co.	2011	Victoria	Vancouver Island	
Île Sauvage Brewing	2018	Victoria	Vancouver Island	
Iron Road Brewing	2017	Kamloops	Southern Interior	
Jackknife Brewing	2020	Kelowna	Okanagan	
Kelowna Beer Institute	2014	Kelowna	Okanagan	
Kelowna Brewing Company	2019	Kelowna	Okanagan	
Kettle River Brewing Co.	2016	Kelowna	Okanagan	
Kind Brewing	2017	West Kelowna	Okanagan	
KPU Brew Lab	2014	Langley	Lower Mainland	
La Cerveceria Astilleros	2020	North Vancouver	Lower Mainland	
Lake Country Brewing	2023	Lake Country	Okanagan	
Lakesider Brewing Co.	2021	West Kelowna	Okanagan	
Land & Sea Brewing	2018	Comox	Vancouver Island	
Lighthouse Brewing Company	1998	Esquimalt	Vancouver Island	
Lillooet Brewing Company	2022	Lillooet	Sea-to-Sky	
Locality Brewing Ltd.	2021	Langley	Lower Mainland	
Longwood Brewery	2013	Nanaimo	Vancouver Island	
LoveShack Libations	2016	Qualicum Beach	Vancouver Island	
Luppolo Brewing Company	2016	Vancouver	Lower Mainland	
Main Street Brewing Company	2014	Vancouver	Lower Mainland	
Maple Meadows Brewing Co.	2015	Maple Ridge	Lower Mainland	
Mariner Brewing	2017	Coquitlam	Lower Mainland	
Marten Brewing Co.	2015	Vernon	Okanagan	
Mayne Island Brewing	2016	Mayne Island	Gulf Islands	
Mighty Peace Brewing Co.	2018	Fort St. John	Peace River	
Mile Zero Brewing	2022	Metchosin	Vancouver Island	
Millstream Beverage Company Ltd.	2021	Langford	Vancouver Island	
Mission Springs Brewing Company	1996	Mission	Lower Mainland	
Monkey 9 Brewing	2017	Richmond	Lower Mainland	
Moody Ales & Co.	2014	Port Moody	Lower Mainland	
Moon Under Water Brewery	2012	Victoria	Vancouver Island	
Mount Arrowsmith Brewing Co.	2017	Parksville	Vancouver Island	
Mountainview Brewing Co.	2020	Hope	Lower Mainland	
Mt. Begbie Brewing Company	1996	Revelstoke	Kootenays	
Neighbourhood Brewing Company	2020	Penticton	Okanagan	
Nelson Brewing Company	1991	Nelson	Kootenays	
New Tradition Brewing	2019	Comox	Vancouver Island	
Noble Pig Brewhouse	2010	Kamloops	Southern Interior	
North Basin Brewing Co.	2020	Osoyoos	Okanagan	
North Point Brewing Company	2019	North Vancouver	Lower Mainland	
Northpaw Brew Co.	2018	Port Coquitlam	Lower Mainland	
Off The Rail Brewing Co.	2015	Vancouver	Lower Mainland	
The Office Brewery	2021	Kelowna	Okanagan	
Okanagan Spring Brewery	1985	Vernon	Okanagan	
Old Abbey Ales	2015	Abbotsford	Lower Mainland	
Old Yale Brewing Co.	1999	Chilliwack	Lower Mainland	
Over Time Beer Works	2016	Kimberley	Kootenays	
Pacific Western Brewing Co.	1957	Prince George	Northern Interior	
Parallel 49 Brewing Company	2012	Vancouver	Lower Mainland	
Parkside Brewery	2015	Port Moody	Lower Mainland	
Patina Brewing	2020	Port Coquitlam	Lower Mainland	
Pemberton Brewing Company	2018	Pemberton	Sea-to-Sky	
Persephone Brewing Company	2013	Gibsons	Sunshine Coast	
Phillips Brewing & Malting Co.	2001	Victoria	Vancouver Island	
Powell Brewery	2012	Vancouver	Lower Mainland	
Radium Brewing	2021	Radium Hot Springs	Kootenays	
Railside Brewing	2022	Kelowna	Okanagan	
R&B Brewing Company	1997	Vancouver	Lower Mainland	
Ravens Brewing Company	2015	Abbotsford	Lower Mainland	
Red Arrow Brewing Company	2015	Duncan	Vancouver Island	
Red Bird Brewing	2017	Kelowna	Okanagan	
Red Collar Brewing Co.	2014	Kamloops	Southern Interior	
Red Truck Beer Company	2005	Vancouver	Lower Mainland	
Rewind Beer Co.	2022	Port Moody	Lower Mainland	
Ridge Brewing Co.	2015	Maple Ridge	Lower Mainland	
Riot Brewing Co.	2016	Chemainus	Vancouver Island	
Rossland Beer Company	2012	Rossland	Kootenays	
Rumpus Beer Company	2019	Revelstoke	Kootenays	
Russell Brewing Company	1995	Surrey	Lower Mainland	
Rusted Rake Brewing	2022	Nanoose Bay	Vancouver Island	
Rustic Reel Brewing Company	2019	Kelowna	Okanagan	
Salt Spring Brewing Co.	1998	Salt Spring Island	Gulf Islands	
Settlement Brewing	2014	Vancouver	Lower Mainland	
Shaketown Brewing Co.	2022	North Vancouver	Lower Mainland	
Sherwood Mountain Brewhouse	2014	Terrace	North Coast	
Shore Line Brewing Co.	2020	Kelowna	Okanagan	
Shuswap Lake Brewing Co.	2007	Salmon Arm	Southern Interior	
Sidekick Brewing Company	2022	Chilliwack	Lower Mainland	
Slackwater Brewing	2019	Penticton	Okanagan	
Slowhand Beer	2019	Vancouver	Lower Mainland	
Small Block Brewing Co.	2018	Duncan	Vancouver Island	
Small Gods Brewing Co.	2022	Sidney	Vancouver Island	
Smithers Brewing Co.	2018	Smithers	North Coast	
Smugglers' Trail Caskworks Ltd.	2017	Langley	Lower Mainland	
Sooke Brewing Company	2016	Sooke	Vancouver Island	
Sooke Oceanside Brewery	2015	Sooke	Vancouver Island	
Spinnakers Brewpub	1984	Victoria	Vancouver Island	
Stanley Park Brewing	2008	Vancouver	Lower Mainland	
Steamworks Brewing Company	1995	Burnaby	Lower Mainland	
Steel & Oak Brewing Co.	2014	New Westminster	Lower Mainland	
Strange Fellows Brewing	2014	Vancouver	Lower Mainland	
Streetcar Brewing	2019	North Vancouver	Lower Mainland	
Storm Brewing	1994	Vancouver	Lower Mainland	
Strathcona Beer Company	2016	Vancouver	Lower Mainland	
Studio Brewing	2021	Burnaby	Lower Mainland	
Superflux Beer Company	2020	Vancouver	Lower Mainland	
Swans Brewery	1989	Victoria	Vancouver Island	
Tailout Brewing	2019	Castlegar	Kootenays	
Tapworks Brewing Company	2017	Gibsons	Sunshine Coast	
Taylight Brewing Inc.	2018	Port Coquitlam	Lower Mainland	
Three Ranges Brewing Co.	2013	Valemount	Kootenays	
Tin Whistle Brewing Company	1995	Penticton	Okanagan	
Tinhouse Brewing	2019	Port Coquitlam	Lower Mainland	
Tofino Brewing Co.	2011	Tofino	Vancouver Island	
Torchlight Brewing Co.	2014	Nelson	Kootenays	
Townsite Brewing	2012	Powell River	Sunshine Coast	
Trading Post Brewing	2016	Langley	Lower Mainland	
Trail Beer Refinery	2017	Trail	Kootenays	
Tree Brewing Co.	1996	Vancouver	Lower Mainland	
Trench Brewing & Distilling	2018	Prince George	Northern Interior	
Turning Point Brewing Company	2008	Delta	Lower Mainland	
Twa Dogs Brewery	2016	Victoria	Vancouver Island	
Twin City Brewing	2017	Port Alberni	Vancouver Island	
Twin Sails Brewing	2015	Port Moody	Lower Mainland	
Ucluelet Brewing Co.	2020	Ucluelet	Vancouver Island	
Unleashed Brewing Co.	2021	Kelowna	Okanagan	
Ursa Minor Brewing	2020	Burns Lake	Northern Interior	
Vancouver Island Brewing	1984	Victoria	Vancouver Island	
Vice & Virtue Brewing Co.	2018	Kelowna	Okanagan	
Victoria Caledonian Brewery & Distillery	2016	Saanich	Vancouver Island	
Wheelhouse Brewing Co.	2013	Prince Rupert	North Coast	
Whistle Buoy Brewing Co.	2019	Victoria	Vancouver Island	
Whistler Brewing Co.	1989	Whistler	Sea-to-Sky	
White Rock Beach Beer Company	2013	White Rock	Lower Mainland	
White Sails Brewing	2015	Nanaimo	Vancouver Island	
Whitetooth Brewing	2016	Golden	Kootenays	
Wild Ambition Brewing	2018	Kelowna	Okanagan	
Wild North Brewing Co.	2021	Creston	Kootenays	
Wildeye Brewing	2019	North Vancouver	Lower Mainland	
Wolf Brewing Co.	2010	Nanaimo	Vancouver Island	
Yaletown Brewing Co.	1994	Vancouver	Lower Mainland	
Yellow Dog Brewing Co.	2014	Port Moody	Lower Mainland	

=== Defunct ===
Company	Founded	Ceased	Municipality	Region	Refs
Axe & Barrel Brewing Co.	2015	2020	Langford	Vancouver Island	
Bad Tattoo Brewing Company	2014	2022	Penticton	Okanagan	
Big Ridge Brewing Co.	1999	2022	Surrey	Lower Mainland	
The Bakery Brewing Co.	2019	2022	Port Moody	Lower Mainland	
Boundary Brewing Co.	2017	2020	Kelowna	Okanagan	
Breakaway Brewing Co.	2019	2021	Summerland	Okanagan	
Callister Brewing Company	2015	2024	Vancouver	Lower Mainland	
Chaos and Solace Craft Brewing Co.	2016	2018	Chilliwack	Lower Mainland	
Coal Harbour Brewing Company	2010	2020	Vancouver	Lower Mainland	
Doan's Craft Brewing Company	2015	2018	Vancouver	Lower Mainland	
Flashback Brewing Company	2013	2024	Chilliwack	Lower Mainland	
Forbidden Brewing Co.	2015	2019	Courtenay	Vancouver Island	
Hearthstone Brewery	2014	2020	North Vancouver	Lower Mainland	
Silver Valley Brewing	2017	2024	Maple Ridge	Lower Mainland	
Steel Toad Brewing Company	2014	2018	Vancouver	Lower Mainland	

== See also ==
- Beer in Canada
- List of breweries in Canada
