= List of breweries in Quebec =

This is an incomplete list of breweries in Quebec sorted by region. Breweries have been cropping up steadily over the past 30 to 40 years in the province of Québec, Canada. In 2013 there were 150 active breweries producing 3,348 different beers. According to BeerAdvocate, 46 of the top 100 beers in Canada are brewed in Quebec.

In November 2023, there were 333 licensed breweries in Québec.

== Abitibi-Témiscamingue ==
- Belgh Brasse (Since 1999) (Amos)

== Capitale-Nationale ==
- La Barberie (Since 1997) (Québec city)

== Laurentides ==
- Les Brasseurs du Nord (Since 1988) (Blainville)

== Montérégie ==
- Unibroue (Since 1991) (Sapporo) (Chambly)

== Montréal ==
Brewery

- Labatt Brewing Company, From London, Ontario, new brewery in LaSalle Since 1954
- Molson (Since 1786) (Montréal)
- Dow Breweries (1790 - 1967) First established in La Prairie then in Montréal
- McAuslan Brewing (Since 1989) (Montréal)

Brewpub:

- Le Cheval Blanc (Since 1986) (Montréal)

Microbrewery:

- Les Brasseurs RJ (Since 1998) (Montréal)

== See also ==
- Beer and breweries by region
- Quebec beer
- List of breweries in Canada

== Sources ==
- Richard Stueven. "Breweries in Québec, Canada", in Beer Me!, 2008
- Bières et plaisirs. "Toutes les brasseries", in Bières et plaisirs, August 2008 (in French)
- « Microbrasseries », Website Institut de la bière, 2008 (in French)
- « All brewerys, address, email and social network», Website Ça Brasse !, 2012 (in French)
- « Beer's promoting and Rating, », Website BeerAdvocate, Boston (Mass), 1996 - 2013
