= List of breweries, wineries, and distilleries in Manitoba =

This is a list of breweries, wineries, and distilleries in Manitoba, Canada.

== Breweries, wineries, and distilleries in Manitoba ==
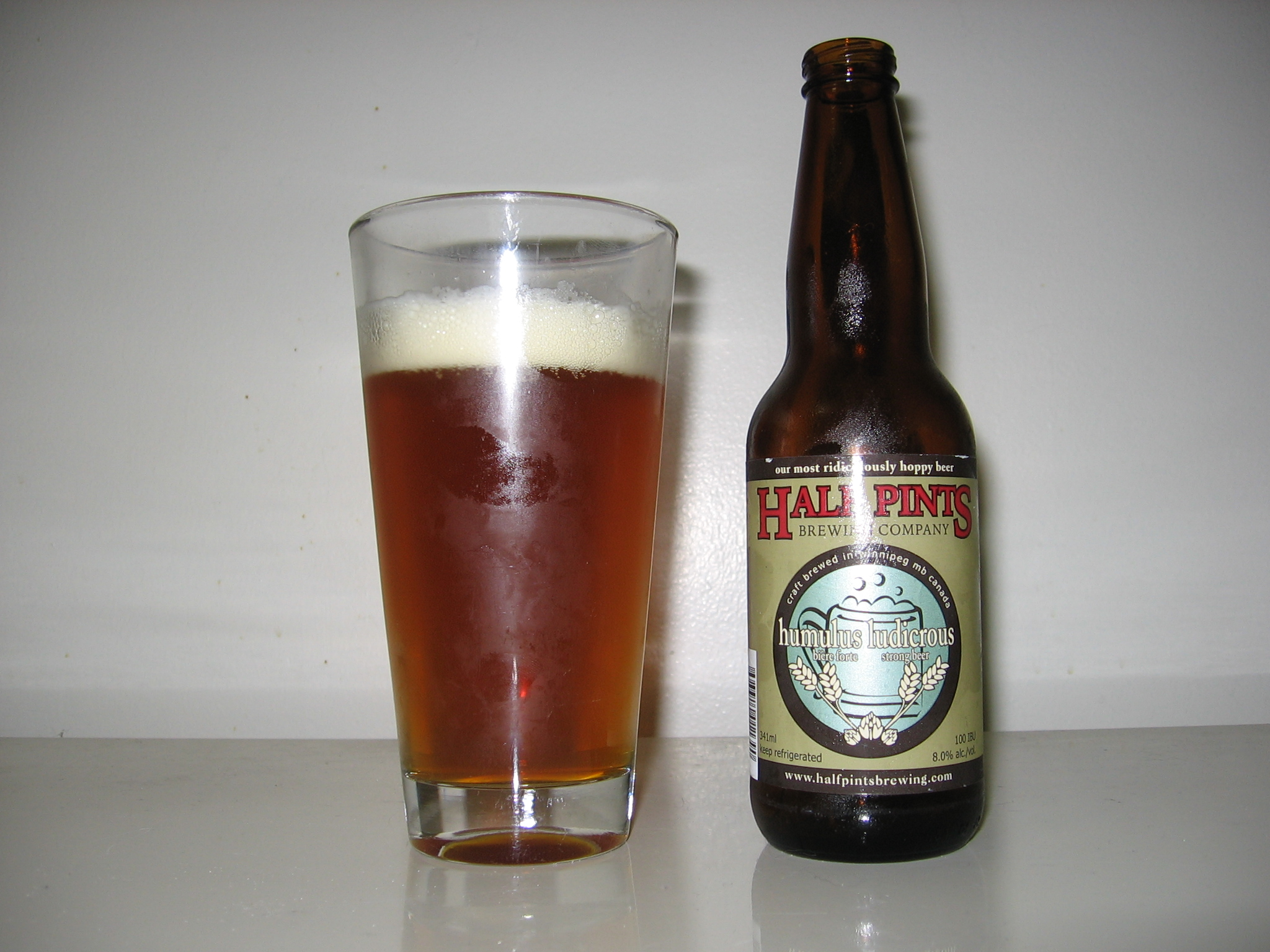
Half Pints Brewing Company's Humulus Ludicrous, a double IPA with a published bitterness rating of 100 IBU

| Company | Type | City | Reference |
|---|---|---|---|
| Agassiz Brewing (defunct) | Brewery | Winnipeg | |
| Barn Hammer Brewing | Brewery | Winnipeg | |
| Bee Boyzz Honey & Meadery | Meadery | Oak Bluff | |
| Black Wheat Brewing | Brewery | Brandon | |
| Bookstore Brewing | Brewery | Winnipeg | |
| Brat Cat Mead | Meadery | Winnipeg | |
| Brazen Hall Kitchen & Brewery | Brewery | Winnipeg | |
| Capital K Distillery | Distillery | Winnipeg | |
| Dastardly Villain Brewing | Brewery | Winnipeg | |
| Dead Horse Cider Co. | Cidery | Winkler | |
| Devil May Care | Brewery | Winnipeg | |
| Diageo Distilleries (Crown Royal) | Distillery | Gimli | |
| Farmery Estate Brewery | Brewery | Neepawa | |
| Fort Garry Brewing | Brewery | Winnipeg | |
| Good Neighbour Brewing | Brewery | Winnipeg | |
| Half Pints Brewing | Brewery | Winnipeg | |
| Heritage Farms Brewing | Brewery | Winkler | |
| Kilter Brewing | Brewery | Winnipeg | |
| Little Brown Jug | Brewery | Winnipeg | |
| La Brasserie Nonsuch Brewing Co. | Brewery | Winnipeg | |
| Low Life Barrel House | Brewery & Winery | Winnipeg | |
| Obsolete Brewing Co. | Brewery | Dauphin | |
| One Great City Brewing | Brewery | Winnipeg | |
| Oxus Brewing | Brewery | Winnipeg | |
| Namesake Brewing | Brewery | Winnipeg | |
| Next Friend Cider | Cidery | Winnipeg | |
| Patent 5 Distillery | Distillery | Winnipeg | |
| PEG Beer Company (Defunct) | Brewery | Winnipeg | |
| The Public Brewhouse & Gallery | Brewery | Steinbach | |
| Rendezvous Brewery & Taproom | Brewery | Morden | |
| Rigby Orchards Estate Meadery | Meadery | Killarney | |
| Section 6 Brewing Co. | Brewery | Brandon | |
| Shrugging Doctor Beverage Company | Winery | Winnipeg | |
| Sookram's Brewing | Brewery | Winnipeg | |
| Stone Angel Brewing (Defunct) | Brewery | Winnipeg | |
| Torque Brewing | Brewery | Winnipeg | |
| Trans Canada Brewery | Brewery | Winnipeg | |
| Winnipeg Brew Werks (Defunct) | Brewery | Winnipeg | |
| Wooden Gate CIder | Cidery | Pilot Mound | |

== See also ==
- Beer in Canada
- Canadian wine
- List of breweries in Canada
