= Beer in Quebec =

Quebec beer is the beer brewed in Quebec, Canada, often with ingredients from Quebec itself and generally following the recipes of the French, Belgian and British brewing traditions. Generally, the beers brewed in Quebec differ from those in the rest of North America because of the relative importance of the French and Belgian traditions alongside that of Great Britain. German-type beers are also produced by some breweries.

== History ==
The history of beer in Quebec goes back to the early days of French colonization. Industrial production began in the 19th century under British rule. A microbrewery industry started in the 1980s, with small production operations found throughout the province today.

=== New France ===
In the 17th and 18th centuries, the colonists of Quebec made an alcoholic beverage which was characteristic of the region for a long period of time: spruce beer. Although spruce beer today generally refers to a soft drink of the same name, it was in fact an actual beer in which spruce replaced hops. Sometimes roots or other "spices" were used. This gave root beer.

According to historian Benjamin Sulte, the first colonists of Quebec, were from the parts of France where the production of beer and cider is more important than that of wine. They must have brought with them the bouillon, an alcoholic beverage from Picardy and Upper Normandy. Pierre Boucher, Governor of Trois-Rivières, was questioned about the colony during a trip to France. He reported: "Wine is served to rich families, beer is left to those who are less wealthy, while others are content with a drink called the bouillon. The poorer ones drink only water, which is of excellent quality."

The Relations des Jésuites for the year 1646 mention that Brother Ambroise prepared beer for the inhabitants.

A marriage contract dated October 22, 1650, mentions the existence of a brewery in Montréal. It is written that the Governor of Montreal Paul Chomedey de Maisonneuve offered "a land adjacent to the property of the brewery" to the newly wed.

In 1690, the Sieur de Longueuil built a brewery on his lands. It was in ruin by 1735. From 1704 to 1744, the Charron brothers, founders of the Hôpital général de Montréal, added a brewery to their building. In all cases, the distribution remained localized.

The first recorded commercial brewery was that founded by Intendant Jean Talon in 1671. Located in Québec City, it produced up to 4,000 barrels of beer a year. The beer was entirely made with Quebec products and half the volume was exported to the Caribbean and Europe. It was however short-lived.

=== Industrialization ===
The first large industrial-scale breweries were founded by Englishmen like John Molson in 1786. Canadian Breweries (CBL) of Toronto, Ontario, established itself in Montreal by the purchase of some 20 breweries including Molson's main competitors in Quebec, Dawes and Dow. CBL later became Carling O'Keefe in 1973.

Labatt, founded in London, Ontario in 1847, established itself in LaSalle, Quebec in 1952. However, its main beers had been available in Montreal since 1878 through a distribution agency.

Molson and Carling O'Keefe merged in 1989. In 1995, Labatt was purchased by Belgian Interbrew (today InBev). Molson merged with Coors in 2005.

=== Renaissance ===
During the 1960s all the way to the early 1980s, there were but three breweries, Molson, Labatt and Carling-O'Keefe, together monopolizing the market.

In 1982, Brasserie Massawippi located in North Hatley produced the first craft beer meant for commercial distribution. La Massawippi, a 5% ale, brewed according to the Bavarian Purity Law of 1516 is no longer bottled, but can still be tried in a bar in North Hatley.

In the mid 1980s, the Régie des alcools, des courses et des jeux started issuing new permits authorizing commercial establishments to brew their own beer and sell it on site. This started the phenomenon of brewpubs in Quebec, shortly after British Columbia.

On July 1, 1986, the Golden Lion Brewing Company served its first pint of beer at the Golden Lion Pub in Lennoxville. One of the first pubs to serve its own beer was Le Cheval Blanc on Ontario Street in Montreal, founded in 1986.

Microbreweries started appearing all over Quebec in the late 1980s: McAuslan, Les Brasseurs du Nord, Brasseurs de l'Anse, Ferme-Brasserie Schoune, and Seigneuriale.

One of the most successful microbreweries, Unibroue, was founded in 1990. It has since been acquired by Ontarian Sleeman, which itself was merged with Sapporo in 2006.

Many breweries and microbreweries have also arisen since then. A few include Les Brasseurs RJ, La Barberie, Hopfenstark (L'Assomption), Brasserie Dunham (Dunham, Quebec), Pit Caribou (Percé, Quebec), À la Fût (St-Tite), Le Trou du Diable (Shawinigan), Dieu de Ciel! (Saint-Jérôme), and Belgh'Brasse.

In March 2008, Quebec had 59 active breweries producing some 402 different beers. By 2014, there were 140 licensed breweries.

== Mondial de la bière ==
Since 1994, Montreal has hosted the annual Mondial de la bière, a beer festival that celebrates Quebec's macro and micro brews. Approximately 80,000 attend the five-day event every year. This 4 day festival usually hosts around 100 breweries and features more than 500 products (beers and related products). The event traditionally takes place at Gare Windsor.

== See also ==
- Beer in Canada
- Cuisine of Quebec
- List of breweries in Quebec
