= Thomas W. O'Brien =

Canadian politician

- Born: March 8, 1859; Oro-Medonte, Canada West
- Died: August 24, 1916 (aged 57); Dawson City, Yukon, Canada
- Known for: Klondike Mines Railway

Thomas William O'Brien (March 8, 1859 – August 24, 1916) was a Klondike gold rush entrepreneur who was best known for his Klondike Mines Railway and Klondike brewery businesses. He was also elected as a member of the Yukon Territorial Council, and was the first president of the Yukon Order of Pioneers, Klondike Lodge.

== Early years ==
Thomas O'Brien was born on a farm in Oro-Medonte Township, Canada West to James O'Brien and Catherine Elizabeth Stevens. He went to school in the vicinity until the age of 14. He then moved to Toronto where he worked as a streetcar driver on the King Street line. O'Brien did not linger long in Ontario and headed west as a young man. He worked as a mail carrier on the Touchwood Hills route, via fort Qu’Appelle and established a homestead in the area. When the unrest in the Métis community boiled over into Louis Riel's rebellion of 1885, O'Brien took advantage of the conflict. He set up a wagon team that was hired by General Middleton to support his troops. Drawn back to the transportation business, he next worked as a contractor. laying railway track around Winnipeg. O'Brien then decided to once again head west. He sold out his interest in the contracting outfit and moved to Seattle, where, hearing about Alaska gold, he set his sights northward.

== Time in the Yukon before the Klondike gold rush ==
Thomas O'Brien reached the Alaska/Yukon area in 1886. He tried his hand at prospecting, but this appears to have been a short-lived career. He prospected in the Fortymile region on the Beaver River with Chris Sonnickson, T. Evans, and ‘Old Herman’. However, like so many gold seekers, he found that wage work was more practical and found work in a saloon, where one contemporary described him as a "good-nurtured portly Irish saloon keeper". O'Brien was ambitious. He soon saved up enough to start his own trading house with his partner Billie Moran in Fortymile and moved the outfit to Circle City. O'Brien soon expanded into the production side of the business and started brewing with a whiskey gang. They ran one of the 31 illegal liquor stills that the North-West Mounted Police recorded in the Yukon Valley in 1894. There is some indication that O'Brien may have married and had children with a First Nations woman during this period. O'Brien appears to have abandoned this family when he moved to the Klondike, when gold was famously discovered there.

== In the Klondike ==
In 1896, gold was found in the Klondike region and O'Brien and Moran moved their trading house to Klondike City. This was a settlement that sat just south of Dawson City at the confluence of the Klondike and the Yukon rivers. At this time, Klondike City was government reserve land that was available by lease only. O'Brien, like many of the professional prospectors in the region, was able to get in before the flood of stampeders and get claims on the rich creeks of Bonanza and Eldorado. In 1896, he purchased of claim no.1 on Eldorado Creek from Jay Whipple in a very profitable acquisition. From his many claims, and especially from claim no. 1, O'Brien pulled $250 000 of gold from the earth. With this cash, he greatly expanded his mercantile operations with Moran under the name Yukon Pioneer Trading Co. With his new found wealth, O'Brien diversified his company into numerous enterprises. O'Brien's mouthpiece in the Klondike was the Yukon Sun newspaper. O'Brien was the president of this paper and in its pages, advertisements for his businesses were common. A whole page is taken up by ads for his Yukon Pioneer Trading Co. and for notices that he was selling town lots for Fortymile. There also appears an advertisement for an O'Brien Club, described as a “gentlemen’s resort for prominent men,” which likely was connected to Thomas O'Brien. His paper ran into legal trouble numerous times, with allegations that it stole other newspapers stories from the telegraph wires and printed them first. O'Brien also had some business interests in Dawson City and was listed as the co-proprietor of the Monte Carlo Saloon.

== Transportation endeavors in the Klondike ==
Thomas O'Brien seemingly could not stay away from the business of transport and it was not long before he put his new found wealth into a related scheme. Transportation was a big issue in the Yukon. Dogs were the most reliable draft animal, as they could live off salmon, the most abundant food source in the region. Dog sled was used for winter travel and riverboats dominated summer transportation. A network of trails sprang up, connecting the claims and settlements, but many were in very rough shape. In 1898, Hill M. Henning took this as an opportunity and applied to the government for concessions needed to support the construction of a tramway. He cleared a roadway from Klondike City to Grand Forks. By October, all the bridges and grading were complete and he was ready to lay tracks. However, Henning's finances gave out and he was unable to pay the 150 laborers for their work. At this point, O'Brien stepped in with a bailout of $30 000 and became the controlling interest. He renamed the venture the Pioneer Tramway Company and having sunk significant money into the venture, he decided to drop the idea of a tramway. To get the quickest return on his investment, he turned the already graded tramway bed into a toll road instead. This turned out to be an unpopular move and many miners refused to pay the tolls. The legality of this change was challenged and, as the charter was specific to a tramway, he was brought to court and forced to stop collecting tolls. This debacle would earn O'Brien the nickname ‘tramless Tom’. He was able to recoup his losses when he applied to the Yukon Council to recover his money. In 1902, he was awarded $35 000 from the government to cover his losses and interest on the original $30 000. The last payment was made in 1906.

Undeterred by this failed first foray in the transportation business in the Klondike, O'Brien started a new transportation venture. In 1899, with the help of the influential new law firm McGiverin, Haydon, and Grieg, Ottawa accepted a charter for the Klondike Mines Railway. O'Brien was listed as president for the venture, which was granted the right to raise a million dollars for capitalization. The law firm was influential in O'Brien getting the charter where many other applicants had failed. Treadgold and Boyle had used the same firm when they obtained their mining concessions.

Unfortunately, 1899 was not a fortunate year to begin a train company. Gold was found in Nome, Alaska that year and this signaled the end of the Klondike gold rush. The population of Dawson dropped precipitously as stampeders headed north, down the Yukon River to Nome. However, O'Brien pressed on, seemingly undeterred. He even diversified and started a shipping company with some Fortymile associates. The Dawson White Horse Navigation Company founded in 1900 would be a short-lived venture. More established shipping companies had too firm a grip on the market, and O'Brien's two boats were not competitive. As for the K.M.R., it was still raising capital and by 1901 was nothing more than a legal entity.

Despite two failed business and one that was going nowhere in a hurry, O'Brien was a wealthy man. According to the 1901 census, he had $72 000 in real estate, $15 000 in claims, and $142 000 in personal property. He even owned a horse valued at $300. In the census, we also learn that he was married to Anna O'Brien. Anna was 15 years his junior: She was 25 to his 40. She was listed as having the occupation of housekeeper. This could either mean that she was a housewife or may suggest that O'Brien had married his housekeeper. At the time of the census, they had two children together: Charlie, aged 4, and Marguerite, aged 2. The family was all of Irish descent, although Thomas O'Brien was born in Canada and was Presbyterian, and Anna was born in the U.S.A. Anna had been 3 years in the Yukon at the time of the census. She was Roman Catholic and the children adopted their mother's religion. O'Brien's occupation was listed as merchant/employer.

The K.M.R. continued to be a major project for O'Brien. However, right of way issues threatened to derail the project. Miners who had staked claims on the gold fields were not keen on tracks covering ground they wanted to dig up. These issues took years to resolve. Construction of the track did not begin until 1904 and the K.M.R. did not officially open for business until 1905. The same year that the long-awaited train service began also marked the opening of another O'Brien legacy. O'Brien's Brewing and Malting Co. (more commonly known as the Klondike Brewery) opened in 1904. Due to the simultaneous launching of these two endeavors, the first freight carried by the K.M.R. was a load of beer from the brewery in Klondike City, delivered down the tracks on Front Street to Dawson City. When it was chartered, the K.M.R. was expected to make its revenue by passenger service, but the shrinking population of Dawson could not support this. The main contract the company fulfilled was the delivery of cord wood, which powered the steam thawing of permafrost to aid the miners. The first profits made by the company did not come until K.M.R. received a contract to haul the first dredges up to the creeks. Cord wood contracts kept the company running, but when stockpiles developed up on Bonanza, the K.M.R. did not have enough business to open for the 1914 season. Hopes remained of reopening within a few years but in, 1920 cold drip thawing which did not require large quantities of cord wood to melt the permafrost was pioneered, and any future prospects for the company were gone.

== O'Brien's Brewing and Malting Co. ==
Unlike O'Brien's foray into trains, his Klondike Brewery was a massive success. The brewery produced steam beer. Steam beer was made through a method pioneered in California, which was desirable because it did not need ice for production. Ironically, this ice free brewing process became the method of choice in the Yukon. Likely, this method was popular because, due to the large number of Americans and the relatively proximity to California, steam beer was a familiar beverage to many. In 1904, the brewery was selling lager beer at $21 (the value of an ounce of gold at the time) per barrel, $18 per keg, or $3.50 a dozen. O'Brien was not financially set back too badly by the failure of the K.M.R. as the success of his brewery largely compensated for his losses. In 1905, Thomas O'Brien again ran for a seat on the Yukon territorial council. O'Brien and his supporters were referred to as the “steambeers” or “Steams”. O'Brien won this election and sat on council from 1905 to 1906. The brewery only lasted until 1919, when prohibition came to the Yukon.

An advertisement for O'Brien's brewery ran in the Dawson Daily News in 1913. “Hear the doctor – So much alcohol is necessary for digestion – it helps to assimilate, stimulate digestion, and insures a healthy tone to the stomach – Beer – contains 3 per cent – no more, no less."

== Political career ==
Despite the nickname ‘Tramless Tom’ and the accusations against his paper, O'Brien remained a popular man. The Yukon Order of Pioneers was a prominent fraternal order, so his election to the presidency of the order was indicative to his status.

Furthermore, in 1900, he was petitioned to run for the Yukon Council. He ran as a Liberal in support of the Laurier government and was accused of bribing The Nugget newspaper to support him. O'Brien received 875 votes in the contest, while Wilson carried the day with 1417 votes.

O'Brien served as the president of the Yukon Liberal Association, but switched to support the Conservatives a few years later. The Yukon Sun newspaper ran an article in 1902 with a petition showing over hundred names supposedly collected over two hours.

During a 1904 election campaign (perhaps the federal election that year), O'Brien was respected by the electorate due to the fact that he, unlike so many who made their fortunes during the gold rush, had stayed and continued to invest in the community. He was also an excellent public speaker and his speeches were reported as being the best presented during the campaign.

He was elected to the Yukon Council in 1905 as the member for South Dawson.

== Final years ==
In 1913, a gold discovery was made on a new creek. The creek was named O'Brien Creek as O'Brien was the man who grubstaked the prospector, by giving him supplies and equipment on credit. With the Klondike in decline, O'Brien sought to use this new discovery to maintain his wealth. He widely publicized his new find and built a store and a hotel in the area of the new gold fields. O'Brien would not live much longer to enjoy the fruits of this latest scheme. Despite his wealth, O'Brien was not a healthy man. Perhaps the years of working with a whiskey gang and running a brewery had made him a little too familiar with drink. He died at the age of 57 on August 24, 1916, of cirrhosis of the liver. His funeral was the biggest that Dawson had ever seen. According to the register at the 8th avenue cemetery, the whole town got a half hour off work to come to the funeral. As for his family, Thomas’ son, Charles Thomas O'Brien, lost his life in the First World War. His name can be read on the First World War memorial in Dawson City, together with the name of his brother, James Jonathan who also fought but survived. His daughter, Margaret Mary, studied at the University of California, Berkeley, never married, and died in San Francisco in 1990. His widowed wife Anna remarried after his death. Anna died in 1927 in Riverside, California.
