= Matt Walker (ice hockey) =

Canadian ice hockey player

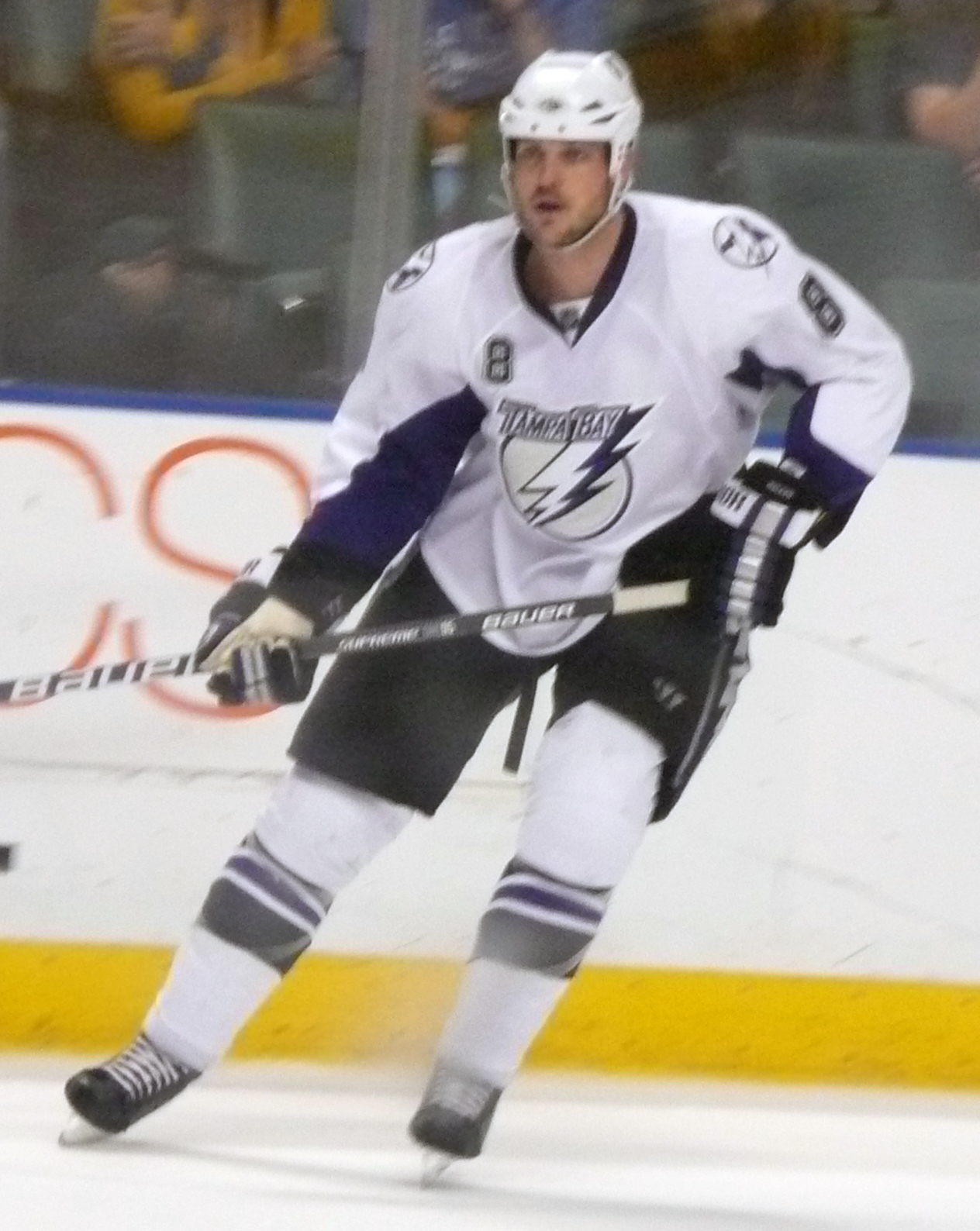
- Walker with the Tampa Bay Lightning in 2010.
- Born: April 7, 1980 (age 46) Beaverlodge, Alberta, Canada
- Height: 6 ft 4 in (193 cm)
- Weight: 215 lb (98 kg; 15 st 5 lb)
- Position: Defence
- Shot: Right
- Played for: St. Louis Blues; Chicago Blackhawks; Tampa Bay Lightning; Philadelphia Flyers
- NHL draft: 83rd overall, 1998; St. Louis Blues
- Playing career: 2000–2012

Matt Walker (born April 7, 1980) is a Canadian former professional ice hockey defenceman who played in the National Hockey League (NHL). During his nine NHL seasons he played for the St. Louis Blues, Chicago Blackhawks, Tampa Bay Lightning, and Philadelphia Flyers. He is the younger brother of former WHL player Darby Walker and cousin of former AHL goaltender Mike Walker, and Olympic bronze medallist curler Geoff Walker.

== Playing career ==
Walker was drafted by the St. Louis Blues in the 3rd round of the 1998 NHL entry draft, 83rd overall. He spent the first ten years of his professional career with both the Blues and their American Hockey League affiliates, the Worcester IceCats and the Peoria Rivermen. After having played 153 games in the league, he finally notched his first NHL goal on February 17, 2008, while the Blues were hosting the Columbus Blue Jackets.

On July 1, 2009, he signed a four-year, $6.8 million deal with the Tampa Bay Lightning. On July 19, 2010, Walker was traded to the Philadelphia Flyers, along with a 4th-round pick in the 2011 NHL entry draft, in exchange for forward Simon Gagné.

Walker's three years in Philadelphia were marred by hip and back injuries, playing in only eight games with the Flyers and 44 games with the Flyers' AHL affiliate, the Adirondack Phantoms. He missed the entire 2012–13 season due to a back injury.

== Post-retirement ==
In 2014, Walker moved to Nelson, British Columbia and bought the Nelson Brewing Company with his wife in 2016.

== Career statistics ==
			Regular season					Playoffs
Season	Team	League	GP	G	A	Pts	PIM	GP	G	A	Pts	PIM
1997–98	Portland Winter Hawks	WHL	64	2	13	15	124	16	0	0	0	21
1998–99	Portland Winter Hawks	WHL	64	1	10	11	151	4	0	1	1	6
1999–00	Portland Winter Hawks	WHL	38	2	7	9	97	—	—	—	—	—
1999–00	Kootenay Ice	WHL	31	4	19	23	53	21	5	13	18	24
2000–01	Peoria Rivermen	ECHL	8	1	0	1	70	—	—	—	—	—
2000–01	Worcester IceCats	AHL	61	4	8	12	131	11	0	0	0	6
2001–02	Worcester IceCats	AHL	49	2	11	13	164	3	0	0	0	8
2002–03	Worcester IceCats	AHL	40	1	8	9	58	—	—	—	—	—
2002–03	St. Louis Blues	NHL	16	0	1	1	38	—	—	—	—	—
2003–04	St. Louis Blues	NHL	14	0	1	1	25	4	0	0	0	0
2003–04	Worcester IceCats	AHL	4	0	1	1	7	—	—	—	—	—
2004–05	Worcester IceCats	AHL	20	2	4	6	44	—	—	—	—	—
2005–06	St. Louis Blues	NHL	54	0	2	2	79	—	—	—	—	—
2006–07	St. Louis Blues	NHL	48	0	5	5	72	—	—	—	—	—
2006–07	Peoria Rivermen	AHL	2	0	1	1	0	—	—	—	—	—
2007–08	St. Louis Blues	NHL	43	1	1	2	61	—	—	—	—	—
2008–09	Chicago Blackhawks	NHL	65	1	13	14	79	17	0	2	2	14
2009–10	Tampa Bay Lightning	NHL	66	2	3	5	90	—	—	—	—	—
2010–11	Philadelphia Flyers	NHL	4	0	0	0	4	—	—	—	—	—
2010–11	Adirondack Phantoms	AHL	11	0	2	2	8	—	—	—	—	—
2011–12	Philadelphia Flyers	NHL	4	0	0	0	16	—	—	—	—	—
2011–12	Adirondack Phantoms	AHL	33	1	4	5	41	—	—	—	—	—
NHL totals			314	4	26	30	464	21	0	2	2	14
