= Klondike Mines Railway =

Railway in Yukon, Canada

- Klondike Mines Railway Passenger Service, September 30th 1909

Overview
- Headquarters: Klondike City
- Locale: Dawson City to Sulphur Springs
- Dates of operation: 1905–1913

Technical
- Track gauge: 3 ft (914 mm)
- Length: 32 miles (51 km)

The Klondike Mines Railway (KMRy) was a 3 ft (914 mm) narrow gauge railway operating in the Klondike region of Yukon, Canada. Construction on the KMRy began in 1905 and the railway ceased operations in 1913.

== History ==
=== 1904-1906: Promotion, Financing & Construction ===
The first to propose a concrete solution for these shortcomings was a businessman by the name of John H. Mackenzie. Arriving in 1898 via stern wheeler from St. Michael to Dawson City, Mackenzie first tried his luck in mining ventures between Fox and Monte-Cristo Gulches, only to reach the conclusion that far greater riches were to be found in the provision of various services to the miners.

Mackenzie understood the construction of a narrow gauge railway as a profitable investment and a sound solution to the Klondike transportation problem, indeed going as far as to suggest that the railway would pay for itself within a mere sixty days of operation. In conjunction with his business partner H. Stratton and with the promotion and financial support of Thomas O’ Brien, Mackenzie applied for a charter on December 17, 1898. A year later and following persistent lobbying from the business trio, a charter in the name of the Klondike Mines Railway was finally granted by the Canadian Parliament.The Klondike Mines Railway Company was incorporated in July 1899. It is primordial to note that it was O’Brien and a few others –James Arthur Seybold of Ottawa, William D. Ross of New Glasgow, Llewellyn N. Bate and Harold Buchannan McGiverin of Ottawa- and not the initial agents which headed the parliament's list of applicants on the charter. More so, the granted charter imposed clear restrictions on the approaching building of the railway, defining the route from start to finish and imposing provisions for both telegraph and telephone lines.

Construction of the railway began in the spring of 1903. Several intertwined developments explain the long time lapse between the chartering of the line and the start of its construction. On the one hand, conditions of the charter demanded that settlements with the over one hundred creeks’ claim-holders for damage compensation be made entirely before the construction of the railway. It was not legal issues with the miners, however, which stood as the prime cause of this construction standstill: it was rather the applicants’ lack of capital.

=== 1906-1910: Completion & Operation ===
In November 1906, the Klondike Mines Railway was completed, traveling a total distance of 31.81 miles between Dawson City and Sulfur Springs.

=== 1910-1913: Defeat & Dissolution ===
When the railway began operating again after the winter of 1910, the KMRy had reduced its weekly passenger service from six to three. The same season would also see the dissolution of the railway's mail contract, an agreement which had been enforced since July 1, 1909. On July 14, 1911, the railway announced a further reduction in passenger service. Trains would now leave only twice a week, on Mondays and Fridays, and a motor car would leave on Wednesdays "carrying a limited number of passengers, mail, and express." Freight trains still operated more than twice a week. Tellingly, the summer of 1911 would turn out to be the railway's shortest season: ending their service on September 29, the railway would only have operated for a mere five months. This season would also be the last to see coach No. 200 & No. 202 in action, later left to rot on Klondike Island.

In light of the clear reduction in passenger traffic and of the exceptionally short length of the KMRy's operation characteristic of the summer of 1911, the company ceased all passenger service for the following year. In spite of this clear reduction in services, the company's imminent dissolution was not so apparent. Before the summer of 1912, General Manager E.A. Murphy anticipated an increase in the hauling of coal and other fuels for the dredges on Bonanza and Eldorado creeks. This predicted increase in freight service led to the purchase of KMRy #4, arriving July 2 on one of the first boats of the season. Perhaps unreasonably, dreams of connecting the Klondike Mines Railway to the White Pass & Yukon Route were still intimated: on May 12, 1912, the Dawson Daily News claimed that "the White Pass may come to Dawson & Fairbanks." The Klondike Mines Railway even doubled its operating staff, now four engineers, three firemen, and six brakemen. Increasingly, freight trains were working up to twenty-four hours a day.

By 1912, the KMRy's most important customers were the gold dredging companies along Bonanza Creek, most particularly those owned and operated by Joe Boyle's Canadian Klondyke Mining Company. Since all of these dredges worked steam thawing plants, these companies were dependent on the railway for the constant delivery of cordwood required for the process. The dependence which characterized the relationship between the gold dredging companies and the Klondike Mines Railway was mutual: having interrupted its passenger service to focus its activities on freight business, the eventual dissolution of three of the dredges on the railroad route meant a significant and incurable blow to the railroad's operation. More so, the railway's efficient focus on providing the materials for the creation and operation of mechanized mining companies implied and necessitated its eventual termination. as Greg Skuce emphasizes in The Klondike Mines Railway, "the railroad hastened its own end by putting the machinery of the modern mining companies into place." With a mining process increasingly mechanized and a correspondingly decreasing population -in large part thanks to the efficiency of the railway in quickly delivering machinery to the major creeks- the railway very much contributed to its own downfall. Tellingly, the population of the territory had dropped from 27,219 in 1901 to 8,512 in 1911, and gold production figures for 1918 show an 80% decline from 1912. The railway could not have done otherwise than to shut down its operations.

== Traffic ==
Ironically, The Klondike Mines Railway engaged in little to no mineral traffic throughout its short stint in operation. The company's principal contract was the carrying of merchandise and lumber to and from the mines. By 1908, the railway was reduced mainly to the hauling of cord-wood to the steam-generating plants that steam-thawed the permafrost ahead of the dredges.

== Rolling Stock ==
The Klondike Mines Railway employed a total of four steam locomotives, two passenger cars, and multiple box and flat cars.

=== KMR No.1 Brooks Mogul, 2-6-0 ===
Manufactured by Brooks Locomotive Works in 1881. With a tractive effort of 10,600 pounds-force (47,000 N) and a boiler pressure of 135 pounds per square inch (930 kPa), this locomotive was originally built for the Kansas Central Railway, where it was used from 1881 to 1890 until it was sold to the Alberta Railway and Coal Company. This engine was then acquired used by the White Pass & Yukon Route, where it was used from 1900 to mid 1902, only to be restored and sold to the KMRy in 1902. It is among the oldest locomotives preserved in Canada, and is in great condition, retaining its original cab. A wood-burning engine, KMR No.1 was used in construction work on the railway and was used as its main engine until the arrival of engine No. 2 in 1905.

=== KMR No.2 Baldwin Consolidation, 2-8-0 ===
Manufactured by Baldwin Locomotive Works in 1885, wielding a tractive effort of 15,100 pounds-force (67,000 N) and a boiler pressure of 150 pounds per square inch (1,000 kPa). This locomotive was first sold to the Columbia and Puget Sound Railroad and after the standardization of its railway in 1898, it was sold to the White Pass and Yukon Route. It served as both construction and revenue engine there until it was re-lettered as KMR No.2 and sold to the Klondike Mines Railway in 1905. Until permanent shutdown of the KMRy in October 1913, this coal-burning engine was the most used of the roster and indeed served as the company's principal revenue and construction locomotive throughout its eight years of operation.

=== KMR No.3 Baldwin Consolidation, Vauclain Compound, 2-8-0 ===
Manufactured by Baldwin Locomotive Works in 1899, this coal-burning locomotive is the only remaining compound engine in all of Canada. With a tractive effort of 21,000 pounds-force (93,000 N) and a boiler pressure of 200 pounds per square inch (1,400 kPa), KMR No. 3 was originally built for the White Pass and Yukon Route. After six years of use, this compound engine was then sold to the Klondike Mines Railway in 1906 and saw little usage from 1906 to 1910. In 1910, the engine was finally put to work hauling cord-wood up to the mines. This locomotive is most particular for its use of the Vauclain Compound Engine.

=== KMR No. 4 Baldwin Prairie, 2-6-2 ===
Built in 1912 by Baldwin Locomotive Works, this engine was unique among its roster in having been manufactured for the Klondike Mines Railway. Operating for a mere two seasons on the KMR, No.4 and its tender were bought by the White Pass and Yukon Route in 1942, using the locomotive into the early 1950s. making the only of the four locomotives not currently owned and held by the Dawson City Museum. The locomotive was used on theme park railways in the lower 48, most recently at the Dry Gulch RR in Oklahoma, where it then was put into a long restoration. In October 2015 KMR No. 4 was moved to the Georgetown Loop in Silver Plume, CO. Georgetown Loop RR sold KMR No. 4 to Dr. Chuck Brantigan operated the narrow gauge locomotive 19 August 2017. Number 4 was nicknamed 'Klondike Kate' by Kathy Brantigan. Klondike Kate 4 operated on Boreas Pass Railroad Day on the South Park Rail Society rebuilt trackage (Denver, South Park & Pacific Railway then operated by Colorado & Southern Railway was abandoned 1938) at Como, Colorado, United States.

=== Buda No. 14 Section Motor Car ===
Powered by a 10-horsepower, two-cylinder, air-cooled gas engine, this open car with seating for approximatively six people was most probably acquired in 1906. The remains of the motor car, wheel-less since 1944, now sit in the Dawson City Museum locomotive shelter aside KMRy #1 to #3.

== Selected books ==
- Four Historic Locomotives at the Dawson City Museum. Submitted by the Commonwealth Historic Resource Management Ltd. To the Dawson City Museum, 1997.
- Johnson, Eric L. The Bonanza Narrow Gauge Railway. Rusty Spike Publishing, 1997.
- Lavallé, Omar. Narrow Gauge Railways of Canada. Expanded and Edited by Ronald S. Ritchie. Fitzhenry & Whiteside Ltd, Markham On, 2005.
- Olynyk, Jane. The Klondike Mines Railway Company. Research paper for Summer Jobs Corps, Dawson City Y.T, August 1978.
- Skuce, Greg. The Klondike Mines Railway: A History. Pamphlet, [Dawson City, YT] : Dawson City Museum, 1993.

=== See also ===
White Pass and Yukon Route
