= Hogsback Brewing Company =

Microbrewery in Ottawa, Canada

- Founded: March 2010
- Defunct: November 2018
- Headquarters: Ottawa, Ontario, Canada
- Owner: Paige Cutland, Frank Costello, Jerry Demetriadis, Mark Richardson
- Website: hogsback.ca

Hogsback Brewing Company (styled HogsBack Brewing) was an Ottawa, Canada, based microbrewery which first began brewing in the Spring of 2010. Their flagship beer was Hogsback Vintage Lager, a European-inspired lager with flavour derived from combining three malt types (2-Row, Munich and Vienna), unique Saaz hops and German lager yeast.

The four owners of Hogsback Brewing Company live in Ottawa and developed the recipe for the Vintage Lager with an Ottawa brewer. The distribution facility is in the Ottawa area, allowing the company to focus on the Ottawa market. HogsBack Vintage Lager was brewed through Cool Brew, an Ontario microbrewery. This approach was chosen to allow the company more time and consideration for the planning and the construction of a brewery in Ottawa.

The company's name comes from the Hogsback Falls in Ottawa, a section of the Rideau River where a ridge of limestone crests the river, giving the appearance of the backbone of a hog. It also pays tribute to Philemon Wright, who founded the first permanent settlement in the National Capital Region and also the first brewery in the Ottawa Valley.

Hogsback Brewing Company was featured on the entrepreneurial television program, Dragon's Den.

A case of Hogsback beer and its subsequent logo and t-shirt were featured several times as a product placement in Jurassic Shark.

Hogsback has been presented with several awards, including a GOLD award, a People's Choice award and the Newcomer of the Year award at the 2012 Ontario Brewing Awards.

On November 1, 2018, the company announced it was ceasing production of its full-time product and would be shutting down. In the final post it was indicated that the company may come back at some point in the future.
