= Central City Brewers & Distillers =

Canadian brewery

- Industry: Alcoholic beverage
- Founded: 2003; 23 years ago
- Headquarters: Surrey, British Columbia, Canada
- Products: Beer
- Owner: Mark Anthony Group Inc.
- Website: centralcitybrewing.com

Central City Brewers & Distillers (CCBD) is a brewery in Surrey, British Columbia, Canada. In 2010, their Thor's Hammer won silver in the Barley Wine-Style Ale category of the World Beer Cup awards.

== History ==
Founded in 2003, the company is known for its Red Racer brand of beer, which includes a range of styles such as pale ale, IPA, and lager. CCBD released its Red Racer Low Rider Raspberry in September, 2017.

In addition to beer, the Canadian company also produces a variety of spirits, including gin, vodka, and whiskey. Additionally, Central City also operates a restaurant and a brewpub at its Surrey facility.

In February 2025, it was announced that Mark Anthony Group Inc. had completed the court-ordered purchase of CCBD for an undisclosed amount.

== See also ==
- List of breweries in British Columbia
