= Paddock Wood Brewing Company =

Brewery in Saskatoon, Saskatchewan, Canada

Paddock Wood Brewing Co
- Industry: Alcoholic drink
- Founded: 1995
- Headquarters: Saskatoon, Saskatchewan; Canada
- Products: Beer
- Production output: 3,000 Hectolitres (2011)
- Owner: Independent
- Website: http://www.paddockwood.com/

Paddock Wood Brewing Co. is a brewery in Saskatoon, Saskatchewan, Canada.

== History ==
Paddock Wood was founded in 1995 as a mail order brewing supply business providing grain, yeast and other brewing supplies to the homebrewing market. In 2000, the business expanded to include brewing kits made in house to which customers would add yeast and complete the fermentation process at home.

In 2004, Paddock Wood Brewing Co entered into negotiations with the provincial regulatory body, the Saskatchewan Liquor and Gaming Authority, in an attempt to change a standing policy that restricted the licensing of microbreweries to premises where the beer was also consumed. In the same year the province changed the regulation allowing Paddock Wood Brewing Co to transition from a supplies business to a licensed microbrewery.

== Production and distribution ==
In 2011, Paddock Wood produced approximately 3,000 hectolitres of beer, equivalent to 500,000 bottles, an increase of 2650 hectolitres over 2007. CEO Steve Cavan has stated that the brewery attempts to adhere as closely to the German purity law for beer production as possible; Paddock Wood does not use rice, corn or added chemicals.

Paddock Wood ships draught beer and bottled products to restaurants and stores throughout Saskatchewan.

== Awards ==
- Gold Domestic Ale at Calgary Beer Fest 2010 for Loki IPA.
- Silver Domestic Lager at Calgary Beer Fest 2011 for Black Cat.
- Bronze Domestic Ale at Calgary Beer Fest 2011 for Imperial Stout.
- Gold Stout, Porter, or Black at Calgary Beer Fest 2012 for London Porter.
- Bronze Rookie of the Year at Calgary Beer Fest 2012 for Red Hammer.

== The Woods Alehouse ==
Paddock Wood acquired a space and permits for a tap house in down town. It closed. Saskatoon, Saskatchewan
