= La Barberie =

Brewery in Saint-Roch district, Quebec City, Quebec, Canada

La Barberie is a brewery in the Saint-Roch district of Quebec City, Quebec, Canada. They have a few commerce points around the province of Quebec and are visible each year at the Mondial de la Bière in Montreal, Quebec.

== Cooperative ==
Founded in 1995 by Bruno Blais, Mario Alain and Todd Picard, this worker cooperative produces special beers for restaurants, bars and cafés. All their beers are made in relatively small quantities and range from india pale ales to strong stouts. The name comes from Bruno's long beard.

Since 1997, a Tasting salon adjacent to the brewery is open to the public.

Since August 2002, it bottles and distributes many of its products in a numerous commercial points principally in Quebec.

== Beers ==
La Barberie produces a variety of beers, including wheat beer, pale ale, amber beer, cuivrées, red beer, strong ale, and stout.

== Distinctions ==
- 2006 - Gold medal at the Mondial de la Bière for its blanche Weizen

== See also ==
- Beer in Canada
- List of breweries in Canada
