= Régie des alcools, des courses et des jeux =

Quebec government regulatory agency

The Régie des alcools, des courses et des jeux (French pronunciation: [ʁeʒi dez‿alkɔl de kuʁs e de ʒø], RACJ) is the board established by the government of Quebec to regulate the alcohol, lottery, publicity contests, gambling, racing, and combat sports industries. There are seventeen commissioners on the board, including a president, usually two vice-presidents, all appointed by the government for a term not exceeding five years.
