= Half Pints Brewing Company =

Canadian craft brewery

Half Pints Brewing Company Ltd
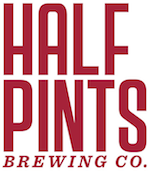
- Type: Privately held company
- Industry: Beverage industry
- Founded: 2006
- Headquarters: Winnipeg, Manitoba; Canada
- Products: Beer
- Number of employees: 15 (December 2016)
- Website: halfpintsbrewing.com

Half Pints Brewing Company is a privately owned brewery in Winnipeg, Manitoba, Canada. Incorporated in August 2006, it is one of 22 craft breweries in Manitoba.

The brewery has grown its capacity and floor space, and has expanded its market west into Saskatchewan, Alberta, and British Columbia. As of 2013 Half Pints has a capacity of 34,000 hectolitres. In 2010, the capacity was 8,000 hectolitres, up from 1,500 hectolitres in 2006 when the brewery initially opened.

Half Pints is owned by David Rudge. Rudge is also the head brewmaster of the company. As of December 2016, Half Pints Brewing has 15 employees.

== Products ==
Half Pints produces four flagship beers: St James Pale Ale, Bulldog Amber Ale, Little Scrapper IPA and Stir Stick Stout. The brewery also produces seasonal beers. In 2011, Half Pints introduced "Queer Beer", a brew for Winnipeg's Pride Festival. Proceeds from the beer are donated to Pride Winnipeg. The beer was brought back for a second season in 2012.

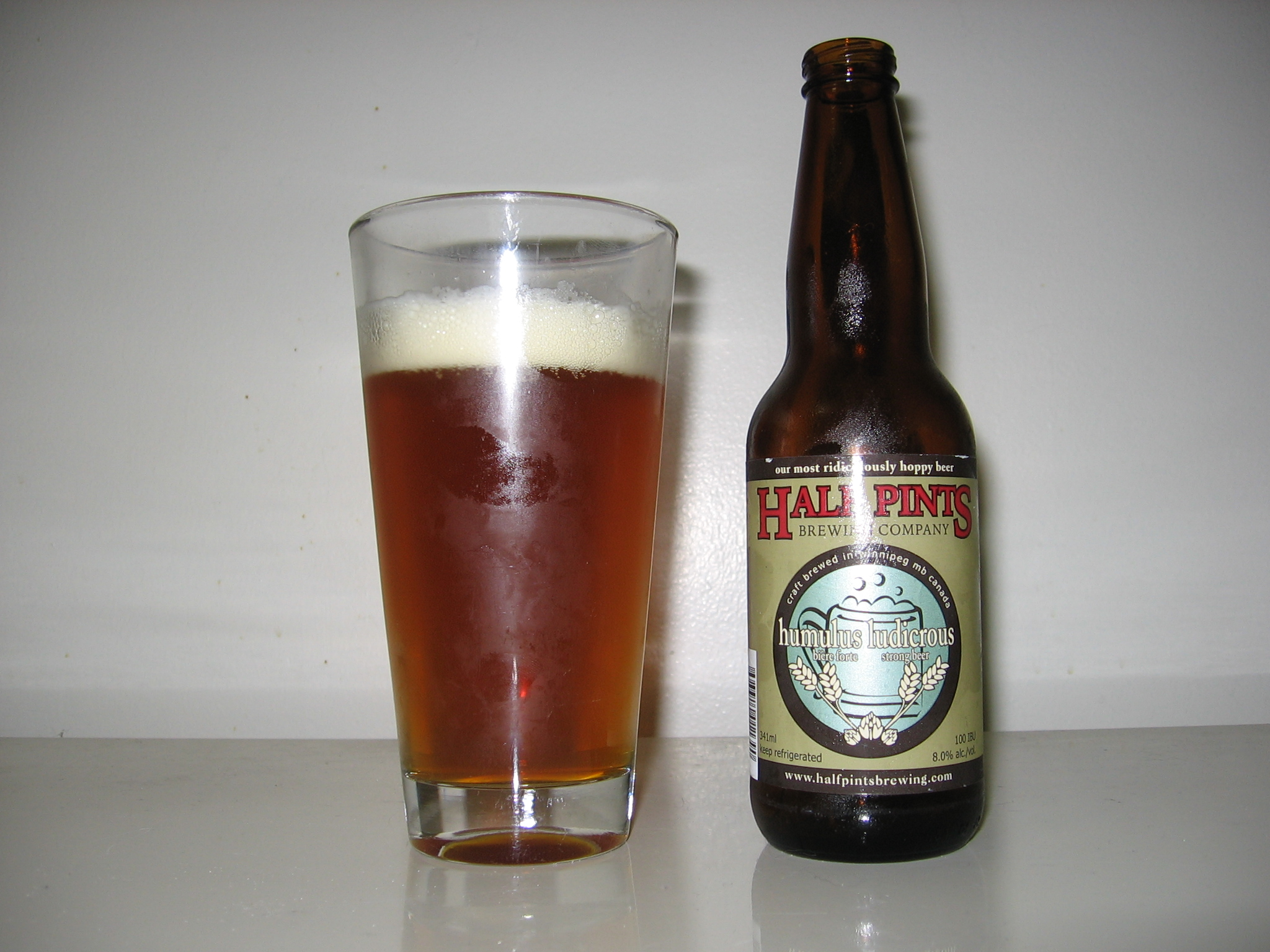
Half Pints's Humulus Ludicrous, an extremely hoppy double IPA, with a published bitterness rating of 100 IBU

== Reception ==
The company's products review well in Beer Advocate, and have appeared in RateBeer's Best Beers of Canada list since 2008, with the Humulus Ludicrous scoring gold in each year.

== See also ==
- List of breweries in Canada
