= McAuslan Brewing =

Canadian brewery

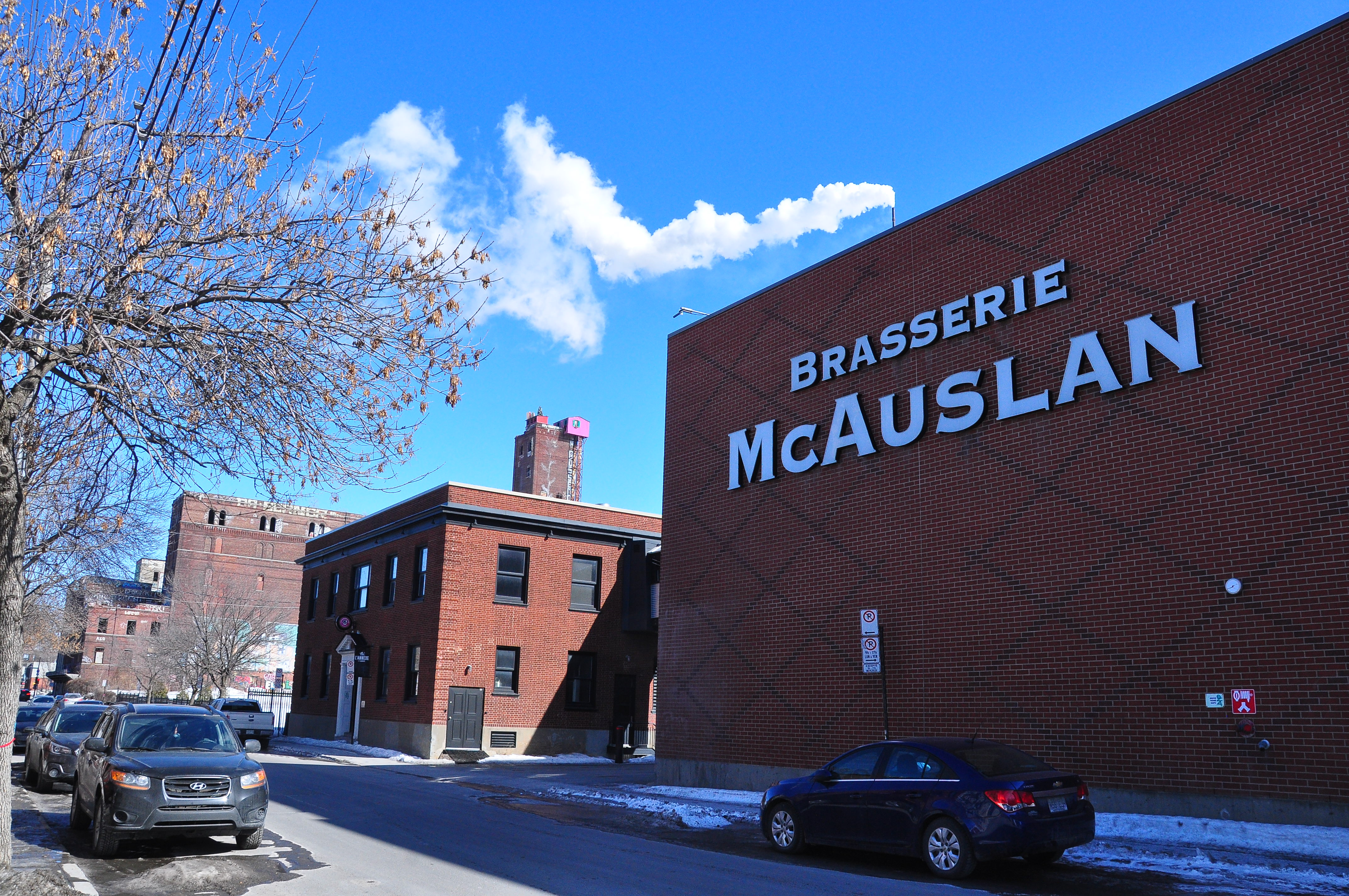
- Brasserie McAuslan in Montreal
- Industry: Alcoholic beverage
- Founded: 1989
- Headquarters: 5080, rue St-Ambroise; Montreal, Quebec; H4C 2G1
- Products: Beer
- Owner: Private

McAuslan Brewing is a Canadian brewery opened in January 1989, and its headquarters located in Montreal, Quebec, Canada. After Moosehead Breweries Limited became a major (but not majority) shareholder, the brewery expanded into a new facility in 2002. McAuslan is still located on St-Ambroise street in the St-Henri borough and currently produces approximately 70,000 HL of beer annually.

In June 2008, Les Brasseurs RJ and La Brasserie McAuslan announced a business partnership specifically for sales, marketing and distribution of their respective brands both within Quebec and beyond. In April 2013, Les Brasseurs RJ purchased full control of McAuslan, and McAuslan's founders left the company.

The brewery hosts regular tours (every Wednesday) of its facility, as well as Centre St-Ambroise, a venue hosting concerts of local independent bands. During the summer months, Terrasse St-Ambroise is open behind the brewery on the Lachine Canal bike path near the Cote-St-Paul locks.

== See also ==
- Beer in Canada
- List of breweries in Canada
