= Parallel 49 Brewing Company =

Microbrewery in Vancouver, Canada

- Industry: Alcoholic drink
- Founded: 2012
- Headquarters: 1950 Triumph Street; Vancouver, British Columbia, Canada
- Products: Beer
- Owner: Parallel 49 Brewing Company

Parallel 49 Brewing Company is a Canadian microbrewery based in Vancouver, British Columbia, Canada. Founded in 2012, the Parallel 49 Brewing Company in East Vancouver is known for brewing craft beers.

== History ==
Parallel 49 is co-owned by Anthony Frustagli, Nick Paladino, Mike Sleeman who also own St. Augustine’s Restaurant & Brewpub, and Scott Venema, Michael Tod and Head Brewer, Graham With, who joined them in 2012 to found the east-side brewery. In their first year of operation Parallel 49 created 30 different craft beers. The brewery's production facility, head office, and tasting room are located at the same address where the company first began brewing in 2012. The custom label artwork and graphics are created by Steve Kitchen of Combination 13.

Head Brewer Graham With also founded the non-profit Vancouver home-brewers association. In 2017, Parallel 49 Brewing Company opened their new Tasting Room, Beer Store and Street Kitchen Restaurant. These new additions include 40 beers on tap, indoor and outdoor seating and feature a street style-inspired menu curated by Julianna Holt.

== Location and operations ==
The Parallel 49 Brewing Company headquarters is located in East Vancouver. The brewery includes Parallel 49's tasting room and restaurant which features up to 40 taps of craft beer, a full kitchen inside of a stationary food truck, and a beer store with 20 taps that accommodates growler refills. In early 2017, the tasting room was renovated and expanded to include a patio and full-service restaurant, offering weekend brunch and a street food-inspired menu.

The brewery has hosted Oktoberfest events on their outdoor patio. The events features Bavarian food, live music, and a "best Oktoberfest outfit" competition."

Several of the beers produced by the brewery have received provincial and national awards such as "Lost Souls" in 2014, "Jerkface 9000" in 2023, and their Bierfest Hefeweizen in 2024.

== See also ==
- List of breweries in Canada
