= Russell Brewing Company =

Former brewery in Surrey, British Columbia, Canada

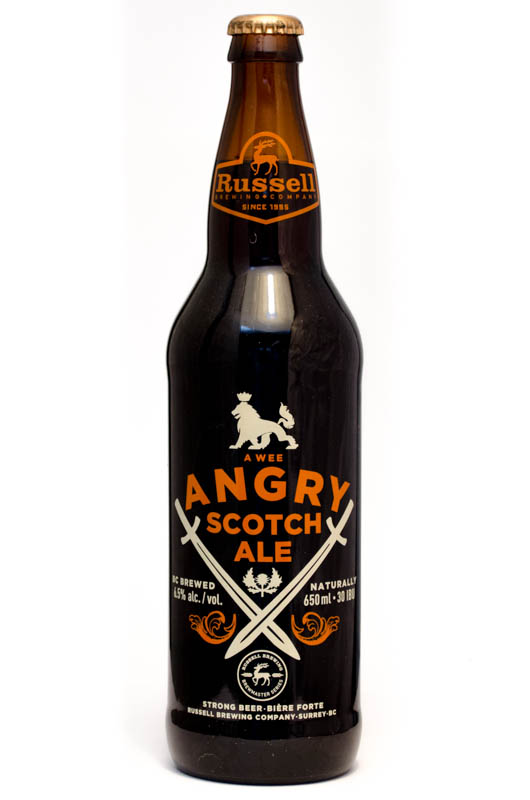
- A Wee Angry Scotch Ale
- Industry: Alcoholic drink
- Founded: 1995; 31 years ago
- Headquarters: Surrey, British Columbia, Canada
- Key people: Graham Kenny (Head Brewer)
- Products: Beer
- Owner: Russell Breweries Inc.
- Website: russellbeer.com

Russell Brewing Company was a brewery in Strawberry Hill, Surrey, British Columbia, Canada.

== History ==
Opened in 1995, the company was bought out from the original Russell family in 2004 by Brian Harris and his four children. Russell Brewing went public in 2005. In 2007, the brewery merged with Manitoba's Fort Garry Brewing Company. Russell Brewing is now a wholly owned subsidiary of BC-based Russell Breweries Inc.

In 2013, Russell Brewing opened a brewery and two restaurants in Hefei, China, with plans to build a chain of brew pubs under the Russell brand. The new company is called Russell Breweries China Inc. and 20% of it is owned by Russell Brewing.

== Awards ==
Russell Brewing Company has entered and won some notable brewing competitions, such as the World Beer Cup (silver in 2012, bronze in 2010), and the Canadian Brewing Awards (silver and/or bronze 2007, 2010, 2012, 2013).

== See also ==
- Beer in Canada
- List of breweries in Canada
