= Nobleton, Ontario =

Nobleton
- Unincorporated community
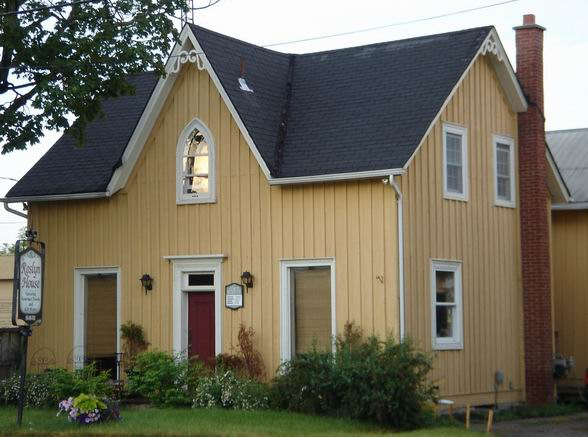
- A Victorian building in Nobleton

- Location within Canada Location within Ontario Location within North America
- Coordinates: 43°54′08″N 79°39′10″W
- Country: Canada
- Province: Ontario
- Regional municipality: York Region
- Township: King

Government
  - Township mayor: Steve Pellegrini
  - Councillor: Dave Boyd (Ward 2)
  - MP: Anna Roberts
  - MPP: Stephen Lecce

Area
  - Land: 8.58 km^{2} (3.31 sq mi)

Population (2021)
  - Total: 6,507
  - Density: 758/km^{2} (1,960/sq mi)
- Time zone: UTC-5 (EST)
  - Summer (DST): UTC-4 (EDT)
- Forward sortation area: L0G
- Area codes: 905, 289, 365, and 742
- NTS Map: 30M13 Bolton
- GNBC Code: FDSCY

Nobleton (2021 population 6,507) is an unincorporated community in southwestern King, Ontario, Canada. It is the third-largest community in the township, after King City and Schomberg. Located south of the Oak Ridges Moraine, Nobleton is surrounded by hills and forests. Many horse farms are found on Nobleton's eastern periphery.

It is located between King City and Bolton along King Road, and directly north of Kleinburg along Highway 27. To the northwest is Hammertown.

== Geography ==
Nobleton is at an elevation of approximately 300 m, just south of the regional peak of the Oak Ridges Moraine.

The Humber River flows in the southwestern part with a conservation area covering the southwest.

The Oak Ridges Moraine is to the north and is covered with pine forests with a few other types of trees and lakes to the north and the northeast. Nobleton Lakes is located nearly 2 to 3 km north and includes two lakes and a golf and Country Club. Forests are scattered throughout Nobleton's valleys to the east and into the southeastern portion. The farmlands lie to the west, south, east, and sporadically to the north.

== History ==
Nobleton was first settled in 1812, primarily based on its location midway between King City and Bolton on the east–west route, and Kleinburg and Schomberg on the north–south route. Taverns and hotels were built to serve travellers, and general stores and a post office were built to serve the fledgling businesses. The board and batten blacksmith shop originally built in Nobleton in the 1850s was moved to Black Creek Pioneer Village.

The village takes its name from Joseph Noble, an early settler of the town, and local tavern keeper.

The slow urbanization of Nobleton began in the 1950s and the 1960s, with development of portions of the village's southwest. Housing developments began in the northern part of the village in the 1990s and 2000s, and accelerated in recent years after construction of a new wastewater system.

== Demographics ==
As of the 2021 census, the top three ethnic groups in Nobleton are Italian (3,120; 47.6%), which is the most concentrated population in Canada, English (470; 7.2%), and Canadian (430; 6.6%).

== Business ==
The town contains two main business plazas, one of which was completed in the summer of 2015, the other one finished in the winter of 2020 (January). The town also has many small businesses owned by locals.

King Brewery, which was founded in 2002, was based in Nobleton. King Brewery was purchased in 2015 by Thornbury Beverages Company (now Thornbury Village Craft Cider & Beer) and relocated to Thornbury, Ontario.

== Politics ==
Nobleton is represented on King Township council by Ward 2 Councillor Dave Boyd.

== Education and community centres ==
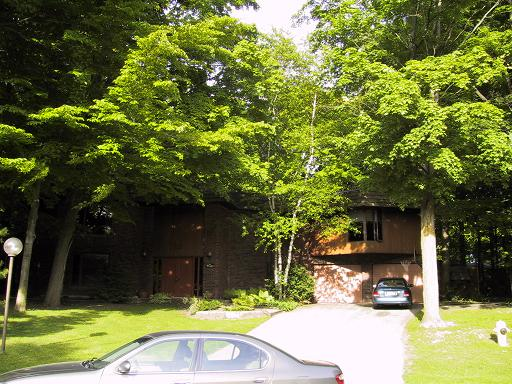
A typical Nobleton house on a heavily wooded lot

The town is served by both public and Catholic separate schools for elementary and junior-age children. In the public system, Nobleton Public School and high school students attend King Secondary in King City.

Nobleton also offers the community an accredited Montessori private school. The Montessori Country School has been a part of the town for over 25 years.

Pre-high school Catholic children attend St. Mary Catholic School and high school students attend Cardinal Carter in Aurora.

Dr. William Laceby Community Centre has a large regulation size ice rink.

== Local services ==
Nobleton Fire Station 38 provides fire suppression for the area and part of King Township Fire Services. Policing is provided by York Regional Police. York Region EMS provides ambulance services.
