= Yukon Brewing Company =

Brewery in Whitehorse, Yukon, Canada

Coordinates: 60.7381°N 135.0787°W

Yukon Brewing
- Industry: Alcoholic beverage
- Founded: 1997
- Headquarters: Whitehorse, Yukon
- Products: Beer

Yukon Brewing (originally Chilkoot Brewing Company Ltd.) is a brewery in Whitehorse, Yukon, Canada. One of their products, Yukon Gold, is the best selling draft beer in Yukon.

When entering the American market, Chilkoot Brewing Company Ltd. faced trademark issues and decided to call itself the Cheechako Brewing Company. In 1999, the name changed again to Yukon Brewing Company. In February 2010, the Company portion of the name was dropped.

In 2009, regulatory changes in Yukon where the brewery is based allowed for distilling. Yukon Brewing distilled and barreled what became a single malt whiskey. The whiskey is marketed under the brand name Two Brewers. In September 2009, Yukon Red, the brewery's amber ale was awarded the 2009 Canadian Beer of the Year at the Canadian Brewing Awards, finishing with gold in the Amber Ale category.
