= Walkerville Brewing Company =

Brewery in Windsor, Ontario, Canada

- Founded: 1885; 141 years ago
- Defunct: 1956
- Headquarters: Windsor, Ontario, Canada
- Website: walkervillebrew.com

Walkerville Brewing Company
- Founded: 1998; 28 years ago
- Headquarters: Windsor, Ontario, Canada
- Website: walkervillebrewery.com

Walkerville Brewing Company is a brewery in Windsor, Ontario. The first incarnation operated from 1885 to 1956. A new company with the same name started up in 1998, but declared bankruptcy in 2007. The company was purchased again and is now a microbrewery located in the City of Windsor.

The brewery has product in many local bars in the area of Windsor and Essex County and the LCBO.

Products:

- Honest Lager (Oktoberfest/Märzen Lager) with German hops.
- Easy Stout (Milk Stout).
- Geronimo IPA (North American IPA) Coarsely filtered India Pale Ale, with grapefruit, orange peel and piney aromas from several kilos of different American hops.
- Purity Pilsener (German Style Pilsener) pale yellow beer with German Hallertau hops.
- Road Block Doppelbock (German Style Doppelbock) Long cool fermentation beer with German malts.
