= King Brewery =

Brewery in Nobleton, Ontario, Canada

- Industry: Alcoholic beverage
- Founded: July 2002
- Headquarters: Nobleton, Ontario, Canada
- Products: Beer
- Owner: Philip DiFonzo

King Brewery was a brewery in Nobleton, Ontario, Canada which won a number of awards. It operated in a traditional German style, producing lagers. Owner and brewmaster Philip DiFonzo gained input from over 200 bars, pubs, taverns, and restaurants before launching in July 2002 with a single Czech-style Bohemian Pilsner. King Brewery's 20 hectolitre brewhouse with a steam-fired kettle was one of very few authentic Decoction Brew houses in Canada. This popular method of brewing in Germany is rare in Canada as it takes longer and is a more expensive brewing process.

The King Brewery Pilsner has won a gold medal at the Canadian Brewing Awards, in the class "European Style Lager (Pilsner)", as well as the 2004 Toronto Star Beer of the Year.

The King Brewery Dark Lager has won a bronze medal in the class "Dark Lager".

King Brewery was purchased in 2015 by Thornbury Beverages Company (now Thornbury Village Craft Cider & Beer). King Brewery's core beers (Pilsner, Dark Lager and Vienna Lager) were reintroduced under the Thornbury brand.
