= Northern Breweries =

Former Canadian brewery

Coordinates: 46.48864°N 81.00427°W

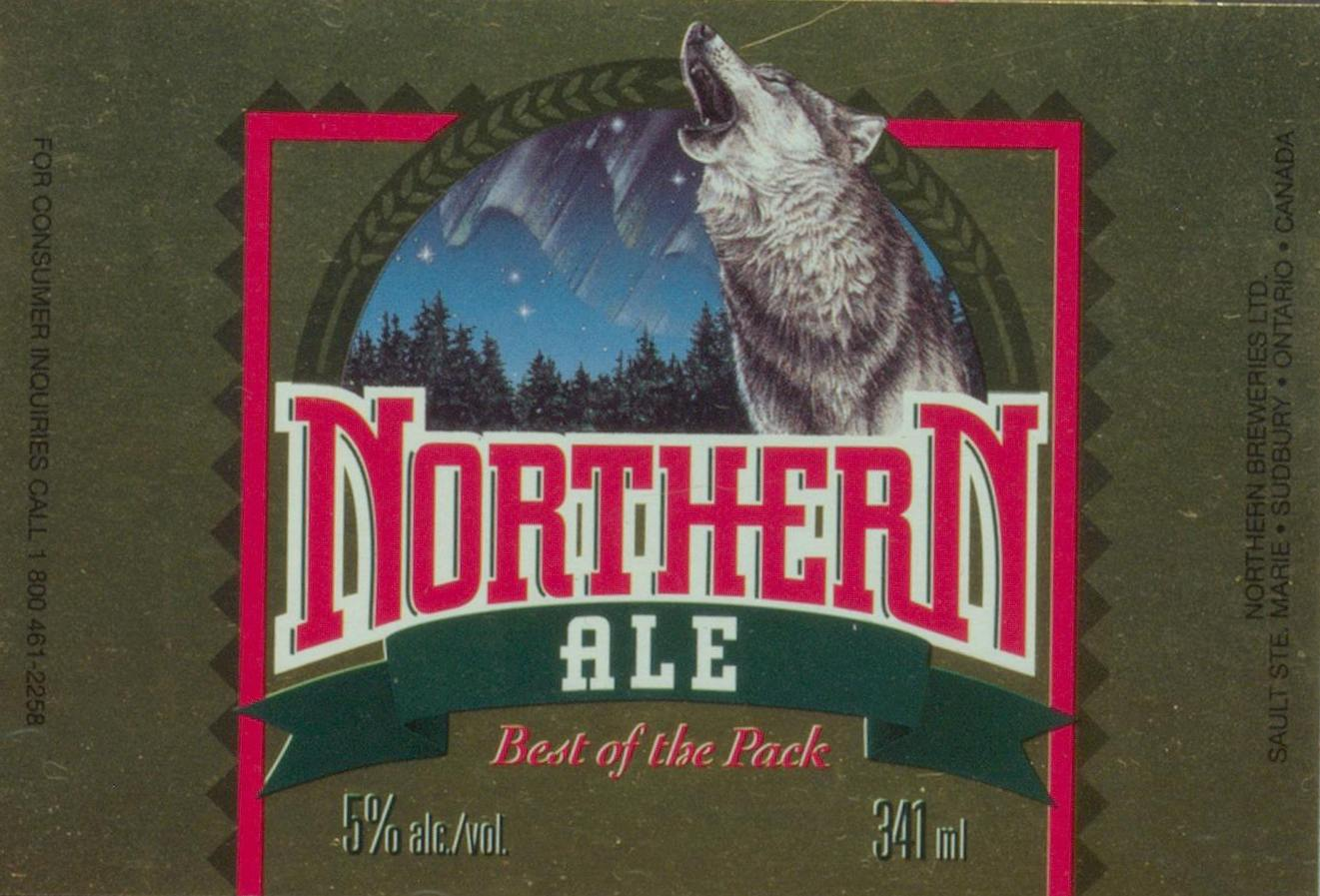
- Northern Ale beer label
- Founded: 1907
- Defunct: 2006
- Headquarters: Sudbury, Ontario, Canada
- Owner: J.J. Doran (1907-?); Canadian Breweries (1971-77) employee-owned cooperative (1977-2004); Leo Schotte (2004-06)

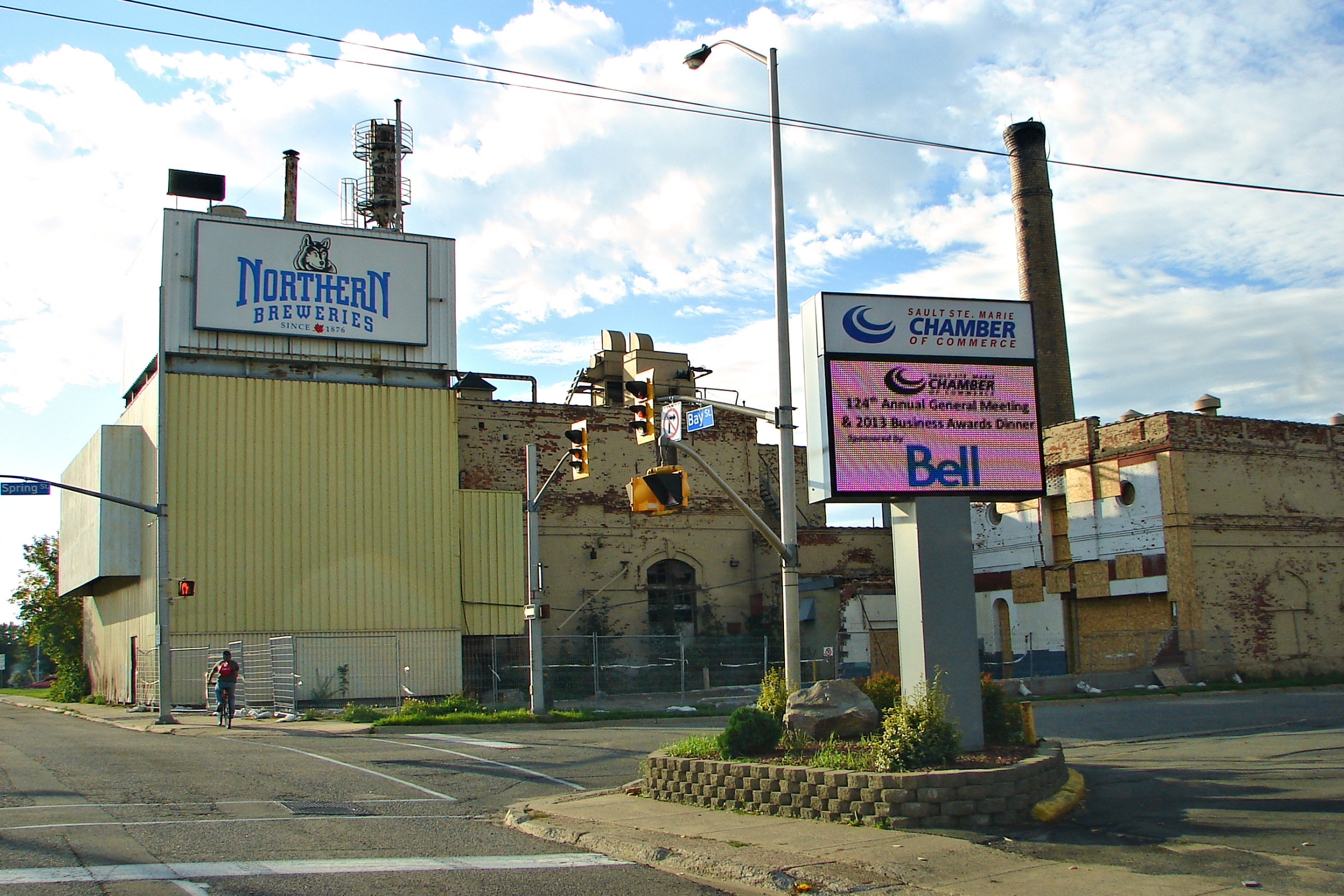
Northern Breweries in Sault Ste. Marie, Ontario

Northern Breweries was a Canadian brewery, with facilities in Sudbury and Sault Ste. Marie, Ontario, in operation from 1907 until 2006.

== History ==
The company was founded in 1907 by three families, the Doran family, the Mackey family and the Fee family. The organizer and operating head of the company was J.J. Doran. Doran, together with co-founders J.J. Mackey and Richard Fee expanded operations throughout Northern Ontario.

Construction and commencement of its primary facility began in Sudbury as Sudbury Brewing and Malting Co. in 1907. It began to expand in 1911, with the purchase of the Soo Falls Brewing Co. in Sault Ste. Marie, and again in 1913 with the acquisition of Kakabeka Falls Brewing Co. in Fort William.

In 1919, the company established its Doran's Brewery division in Timmins, and in 1948 it acquired the Port Arthur Beverage Co. in Port Arthur.

All of the individual breweries operated under their original names until 1960. In that year, all of the brewing operations were consolidated under one management, relinquishing their previous names and becoming known as Doran's Northern Breweries.

During its prime, the company's most distinctive product was the "draft ball", draft beer packaged in a large plastic ball instead of a conventional metal beer keg.

== Acquisitions ==
On August 31, 1971 the company was purchased by Canadian Breweries, although it continued to operate under the name Doran's Northern Breweries. In July 1977, the Doran's employees purchased the company back from Canadian Breweries, and Northern became the first employee-owned brewing cooperative in North America.

In 1979, the brewery began marketing its beers in Southern Ontario as well.

In 2004, following a significant decline in the company's financial stability that saw the company default on its municipal property taxes in both Sudbury and Sault Ste. Marie, the company was purchased by an investment group led by Leo Schotte. Schotte hired a veteran of the brewery business in Canada, William Sharpe, as president. In 2005, the company announced a major rebranding effort, retiring many of its old products in favour of more modern brews and brand identities.

== Bankruptcy ==
In 2006 questions were raised at Sudbury and Sault Ste. Marie city councils about tax benefits extended to Northern Breweries and whether the brewery was meeting the conditions of the agreement. One of the conditions was increased hiring at the breweries and there was no evidence that this had taken place. In June 2006, Sharpe appeared before Sault Ste. Marie city council and cited poor sales and lack of investor interest as reasons for the downturn in the company's fortunes. By 2006, the brewery was $7 million in debt and had ceased production at the Sudbury facility. Sharpe left the company in July 2006, and by December the company was defunct.

Northern Breweries products are no longer being manufactured. A tax sale of its assets took place in 2009.

== Redevelopment ==
The company's facility in Sudbury was acquired in 2010 by Sookram Bus Lines, a local tour and charter bus operator, but owner Druve Sookram put the building back up for sale in 2013 after determining that his plans for the building were not financially feasible. In June 2014, real estate developer Greg Oldenburg acquired the Sudbury facility, announcing plans to convert the building into a loft condominium development. In November 2016, Oldenburg received rezoning approval from the city's planning department to proceed with his conversion plans.

The facility in Sault Ste. Marie was acquired by Renaissance Place Corporation in 2011, with a mixed condominium and retail project planned for the site, but was damaged by arson in 2013 and has been listed for resale after falling into tax arrears.

New microbrewery companies have been established in both cities since Northern Breweries' demise, with Stack Brewing launched in Sudbury in 2013, OutSpoken Brewing launched in Sault Ste. Marie in 2014 and Northern Superior Brewing launched in Sault Ste. Marie in 2015. The website, www.northernbreweries.com, is currently owned by Virtual Sales Partners.

In April 2025, the Sudbury building was purchased by the owners of Wacky Wings, a downtown restaurant that had been forced to relocate due to the Sudbury Arena redevelopment project. A portion of the complex is slated to reopen in 2026 as the new location of Wacky Wings, with redevelopment plans for the rest of the building to be announced in the future.
