= Agassiz Brewing =

Defunct brewery in Manitoba, Canada

Agassiz Brewing Company Ltd
- Industry: Alcoholic beverage
- Founded: 1998
- Defunct: 2010
- Headquarters: Winnipeg, Manitoba, Canada
- Products: Beer

The Agassiz Brewing Company was a Canadian brewery, founded by former Fort Garry Brewing Company brewmaster Gary De Pape. Established in 1998 in Winnipeg, Manitoba, it operated there until 2010. The company was named for the prehistoric glacial Lake Agassiz, which once covered much of Manitoba. Agassiz beer was available in Manitoba, Saskatchewan, Ontario, and British Columbia.

== History ==
Agassiz Brewing Company was founded by former Fort Garry Brewing Brewmaster Gary De Pape. It was established in Winnipeg in late 1998 and officially opened on March 17, 1999. Agassiz was one of these microbreweries that launched in Manitoba in the late 1990s, alongside Fort Garry and Two Rivers Brewing, to produce and bottle locally made ales and lagers for the Winnipeg and Manitoba market. The company received some funding from the Government of Manitoba.

Agassiz had a successful first year, launching its version of a Mild Ale with Catfish Cream Ale as its flagship brand. It also released a Bohemian-style lager, Premium Pilsner, and later introduced Canada's first packaged German Hefeweizen, Harvest Haze Hefeweizen, which enjoyed tremendous success. At the end of its first year, Agassiz launched a limited edition Bock Beer made with orange peel and Manitoba honey, which sold out in hours. De Pape was the first Manitoba brewer to enter the American market when he signed a tri-state distribution agreement for North Dakota, South Dakota and parts of Minnesota with the Miller Distributor, Beverage Wholesalers. However, after pressure from his shareholders steered the company into a different direction, De Pape left to pursue other interests. As per that US distribution agreement, once De Pape left, Beverage Wholesalers wanted nothing to do with Agassiz and the contract ended. Immediately after, Manitoba and Saskatchewan sales of its beers dropped and Agassiz Brewing had difficulty covering operating costs as it was only selling a small volume, of its 600,000 litre capacity. After considering several options, including approaching rival Fort Garry, it closed its Winnipeg operation on January 31, 2002, sold its assets and went bankrupt to re-emerge as a contract brewer, known as New Manitoba Brewing Ltd. New Manitoba handled marketing, sales, and distribution, leaving brewing and packaging to Northern Breweries of Sudbury, Ontario. New Manitoba then came to terms with Fort Garry on a co-packing arrangement. On October 15, 2004, New Manitoba signed an agreement with its former rival for that company to warehouse, distribute and market Agassiz brands. Fort Garry ended that relationship in January 2010, saying they were too busy with their own brands to have room in their tanks for Agassiz's last brand, Catfish Cream Ale. Joe Constant, a partner in New Manitoba, said he and his partners tried unsuccessfully to get other small breweries to take on brewing Catfish.

== Former brands ==
- Catfish Cream Ale (5% alcohol by volume)
- Bison Blonde Lager (4.8%), a helles-style lager
- Dark Lager, a Munich dark lager
- Winnipeg Kolsch (available on tap only)
- Harvest Haze Hefeweizen

== See also ==
- Beer in Canada
- List of breweries, wineries, and distilleries in Manitoba
