= Farmery Estate Brewery =

Brewery in Manitoba, Canada

- Type: Privately held company
- Industry: Beverage industry
- Founded: 2012
- Headquarters: Winnipeg, Manitoba
- Products: Beer
- Owners: Chris Warwaruk; Lawrence Warwaruk
- Website: farmery.ca

Farmery Estate Brewery is a privately owned brewery based out of Neepawa, Manitoba, Canada. The beer is brewed in-house in Neepawa, after previously brewing in Muskoka, Ontario. Farmery is sold in Manitoba, Saskatchewan and Alberta.

As of 2018, the Farmery's core line of products include Farmery Premium Lager, Blonde Canadian Pale Ale, Prairie Berry Ale as well as malt-based coolers such as Pink Lemonale and Hard Iced Tea. They also have a variety of seasonal releases throughout the year including Pioneer Harvest Stout, Fresh Hop Ale (Autumn), Robbie Scotch Ale (Winter), Hop Bine Rye IPA and Wind Chill Lager. The beers use three strains of hops, prairie-grown barley, yeast, water and wheat protein.

The brewery is owned by Chris and Lawrence Warwaruk, two brothers from an agriculture background. Before starting the company, they were farmers in Neepawa, Manitoba. They acquired the family farm, but they were on the verge of bankruptcy. The two brothers moved to Winnipeg and opened Lux Sole. After 10 years, Chris and Lawrence transitioned their bar into Winnipeg's first gastropub, with over 100 beers on selection. The opening of the pub allowed Chris and Lawrence to go back to their roots, and using the knowledge they acquired from the service industry, they launched Farmery Brewery.

== Dragon's Den ==
On January 8, 2013, the brothers appeared on the Season 8 finale of CBC's Dragon's Den. They pitched the idea of building a brewery on the farm estate where all the ingredients are grown. David Chilton and Arlene Dickinson agreed in a partnership that would give the brothers $200,000 to help build the brewery in exchange for six per cent of royalties. This would make Farmery the first estate brewery in Canada.
