= Steamworks Brewing Company =

Microbrewery in Burnaby, British Columbia, Canada

- Industry: Alcoholic drink
- Founded: 1995
- Headquarters: Burnaby, British Columbia, Canada
- Products: Beer
- Owner: Steamworks Brewing Company

The Steamworks Brewing Company is a Canadian microbrewery based in Burnaby, British Columbia. Founded in 1995, Steamworks was originally based out of the Gastown brewpub located in the city of Vancouver. In 2013, the current brewery and taproom opened in the neighbouring city of Burnaby.

== Products ==
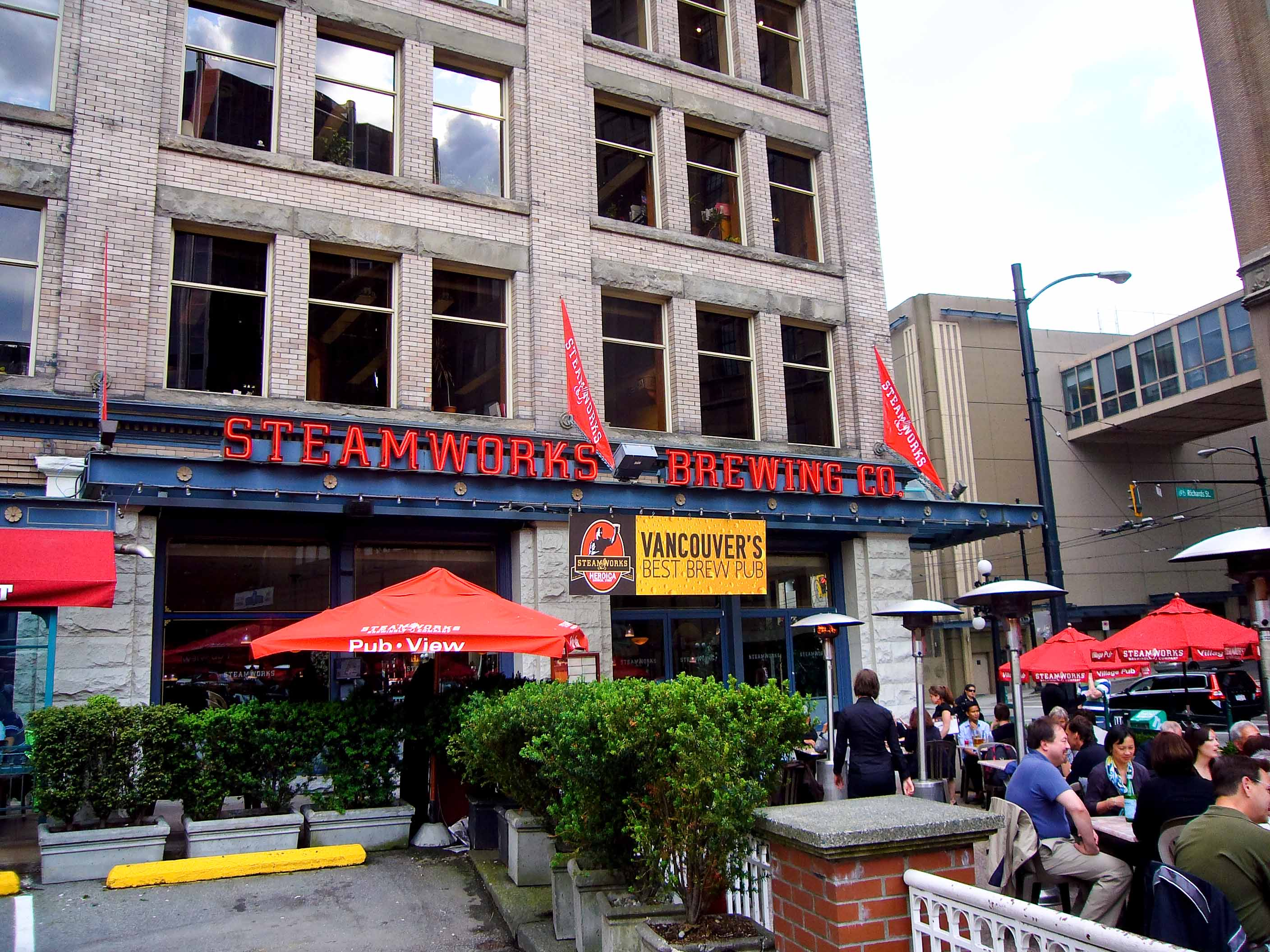
Steamworks brewpub in Downtown Vancouver

Steamworks brews a number of craft beers, some of which are on their tap year round and some that are seasonal. Year round, Steamworks offers their award winning Flagship IPA, signature Pale Ale, Kölsch, Pilsner, India Pale Ale, Black Angel IPA, White Angel IPA, Heroica Red Ale and Imperial Red Ale.

Seasonal and Limited Releases include Blitzen, Oatmeal Stout, Winter White Stout, Pumpkin Ale, Killer Cucumber Ale, Farmhouse Wheat Ale, Frambozen, Hop Attack, and Saison.

As part of a 100th year commemoration, Steamworks brewed Copper Roof Ale, an ESB (extra special bitter) reflecting the copper roof of the original Vancouver Sun building located near Gastown.

In 2016, the brewery won the "Best in Show" category at the B.C. Beer Awards.

== See also ==
- Beer in Canada
