= Nelson Brewing Company =

Brewery in Nelson, British Columbia, Canada

- Industry: Alcoholic drink
- Founded: 1991
- Headquarters: Nelson, British Columbia, Canada
- Products: Beer
- Owner: Matt Walker
- Website: https://www.nelsonbrewing.com/

The Nelson Brewing Company is a brewery in Nelson, British Columbia, Canada, not to be confused with The Nelson Brewing Company in Chatham, Kent, England. The original Nelson Brewing and Ice Company was founded in 1892 by Robert Reisterer. In 1956, the brewery moved to Creston, BC and became the Columbia Brewing Company, leaving the original building unoccupied for nearly 40 years. In 1991, a group of local businessmen reopened the Nelson Brewing Company in its original historical building and by 2006 became BC's largest fully certified organic brewery. While most beer from the Nelson Brewing Company is consumed in the Kootenays, it is available across British Columbia, Alberta, and Saskatchewan.

In the summer of 2017, Nelson Brewing Company opened its Tasting Room.

== Awards ==
Awards won by the company's products include 3 Gold medals for "After Dark Ale" in the British Brown Ale category, "Hooligan Organic Pilsner" in the North American Light Beer category, "Organic Wild Honey Ale" in the North American Blonde Ale category, and a Silver medal for "Paddywhack Organic IPA" in the British Pale Ale category at the 2016 BC Beer Awards.

In 2017 Nelson Brewing company won 2 Silver Medals for "Hooligan Organic Pilsner" in the North American Light Beer category, "Nelson Blackheart Oatmeal Stout" in the British Stout category and a Bronze medal for "Nelson Hopgood Organic Session IPA" in the British Bitter category at the BC Beer Awards.

== Products ==
All products brewed by Nelson Brewing Company are

not necessarily certified organic.

- Hooligan Organic Pilsner
- Harvest Moon Hemp Ale
- Wild Honey Ale
- Happy Camper Summer Ale
- Hopgood Session IPA
- Paddywhack IPA
- After Dark Brown Ale
- Face Plant Winter Ale
- Bent Pole Northwest IPA
