= Belgh Brasse =

Brewery in Quebec, Canada

Coordinates: 48.5584°N 78.1300°W

- Industry: Beverages
- Founded: 1999; 27 years ago
- Founder: Jean-Louis Marcoux
- Headquarters: Amos, Quebec, Canada
- Products: Beer
- Website: Belghbrasse.com

Belgh Brasse is a brewery currently based in Laval, Quebec. It was formerly located in Amos in the Abitibi region of Northwestern Quebec, Canada.

== History ==
The business was founded in 1999 by Jean-Louis Marcoux, a Belgian brewmaster, in Amos, Quebec. At the beginning, the business was selling the beer "8". In 2004, Jean-Louis Marcoux, a devoted entrepreneur and beer brewing passionate, brought together some private investors to grow the brewery.

In 2007 the business was purchased by Groupe Geloso.

In 2011 Belgh Brasse launched a new product, the beer Mons.

Following a fire at its Amos location in 2017, the business was relocated to the premises of Groupe Geloso in Laval, Quebec in 2019.

== Previous Products ==
8

Their first product was called "8", a Belgian-style bottle-fermenting beer. This beer is not on the market anymore.

Taïga

Their second product was the Taïga, a golden ale launched at Christmas 2004. The water for this beer was taken from a local esker; the high quality of this water was one of the reasons for the beer's success. This beer is no longer on the market.

== Current Products ==
Mons

An abbey ale line is called Mons. This is a product line of three abbey ale inspired beers. They have a white beer (Abbey Witte), a blonde beer (Abbey Blonde), a dubell (Abbey Dubbel) and a Quadruppel (Abbey Quadruppel). The name Mons is inspired by the city of Mons, where Jean-Louis Marcoux, the brewmaster was born. This beer already has success in United States and in Canada.

La Bittt à Tibi

This is a line of beers the brewer says is inspired by the music and poetry of Raôul Duguay. These each have a boreal forest animal on the label. The original three released were a Pale Ale (Moose); Blond Lager (Bear); and Kristall Witte (Wolf). Subsequently, three more were added: an India Pale Ale (Arctic Hare); Red Ale (Fox); and Pilsner (Beaver). By 2022, a White Beer (Owl) was added.

== Awards ==
The Mons Abbey Witte beer won a bronze medal in the category Wheat Beer—Belgian Style White/Wit at the Canadian Brewing awards 2012; gold medals in the category in 2016 and 2019; and a silver medal in 2020 in the category Wheat Beer—Belgian-Style Strong Ale Pale/Dark/Specialty.

== See also ==
- Beer in Canada
