= Red ale =

Red ale can refer to two styles of beer which are some shade of red or light brown in hue:

- Irish red ale
- Flanders red ale, from Belgium
