= Fort Garry Brewing Company =

Brewery in Winnipeg, Manitoba, Canada

Fort Garry Brewing Company Ltd
- Industry: Alcoholic beverage
- Founded: 1920s, 1994
- Headquarters: Winnipeg, Manitoba; Canada
- Products: Beer
- Owner: private ownership
- Website: www.fortgarry.com

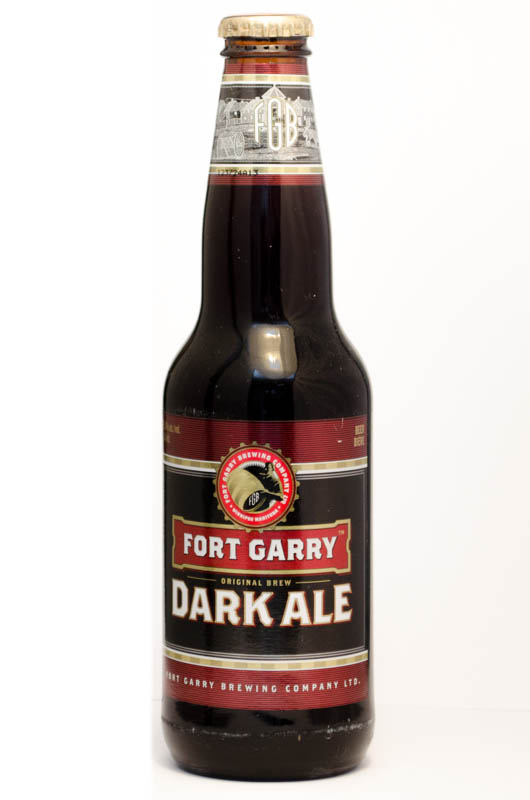
Fort Garry Dark Ale

The Fort Garry Brewing Company Ltd is a brewery in Winnipeg, Manitoba, Canada.

== History ==
The company was bought by the Hoeschen family in 1930, and operated by them until it was sold to Molson in 1960, and incorporated as Molson's Fort Garry Brewery Ltd. In 1990, Molson merged with Carling O'Keefe and closed the Fort Garry facility. In 1994, Richard D. Hoeschen resurrected the company. At the time, Fort Garry Brewing was the only micro-brewery in Manitoba, and the beer was originally intended only to be available in kegs. Before opening the doors, Hoeschen hired Gary De Pape as brewmaster and the two developed the company's flagship beer Fort Garry Dark. Richard D. Hoeschen died on September 16, 2002.

In 2003, Fort Garry Brewing amalgamated with Winnipeg's Two Rivers Brewing Company (established in the 1990s), keeping the Fort Garry name, but adding some of Two Rivers’ brands to its product line.

On 15 October 2004, Fort Garry Brewing signed an agreement with its former Manitoba rival, New Manitoba Brewing, to warehouse, distribute and market the Agassiz Brewing brand, Catfish Cream Ale. In 2010, Fort Garry Brewing ceased production of the product.

Since 2005, Fort Garry Beer is sold in Manitoba and Alberta.

In 2007, Fort Garry began to brew and bottle Nubru Blend, the first gluten-free beer in Manitoba, for FarmPure Beverages of Regina, Saskatchewan. On October 22 that year, Fort Garry Brewing Company amalgamated with Russell Brewing Company as wholly-owned subsidiaries of Russell Breweries Inc., of Surrey, British Columbia, in a deal worth $4 million in cash and stock.

In 2008, 2009, and 2010, the brewery produced a custom brew for Winnipeg's Folklorama festival, called "Folklorama Beer".

In 2012, Fort Garry Brewing Company partnered with the Winnipeg Goldeyes to produce a pilsner called "Angry Fish" to promote the team's new secondary logo. As of May 2021, the current brewmaster at Fort Garry is Josh Berscheid.

== See also ==
- Agassiz Brewing Company
- Upper Fort Garry
- Lower Fort Garry
- Canadian beer
- Barrel-aged beer
