= Lighthouse Brewing Company =

Canadian brewery

Lighthouse Brewing Company is a brewery in Esquimalt, British Columbia, Canada.

== History ==
Lighthouse was founded in 1998 by Paul Hoyne with an investment of $750,000CAN. At that time the company had a single brewer, and produced draft beer in batches of 2,000 litres. Its first product was Race Rocks amber ale.

By 2005 the company was operating a canning line.

In 2009 the brewery was in the news when its owner at the time, Dave Thomas, was prevented by British Columbia liquor laws from selling the company's beer in a pub he owned.

In 2012, the company's beverages won three prizes at the British Columbia Beer Awards.

In 2013, Lighthouse extended its operations into a nearby 6,000-square-foot space and expanded production from four to seven regular varieties. It also stepped up brewing of specialty brews and opened a "growler" station at which visitors can test these on site. Siren Red Ale won the 3 Degrees Marketing Trophy at the Australian International Beer Awards for Best Amber/ Dark Ale.

== Products ==
Lighthouse Brewery names its beers after nautical themes in British Columbia.

Lighthouse brews a variety of types of beer in small batches, including stout, light and dark ale, lager, and single batches of specialty beers. The labels for its products are designed by local artists.
