= Les Brasseurs du Nord =

Canadian brewery

Coordinates: 45.6630°N 73.8870°W

Les Brasseurs du Nord (The Brewers of/from the North) is a brewery just north of Montreal, in Blainville, Quebec, Canada.

== History ==
Founded in 1987 by three students at the UQAM (Laura Urtnowski, and brothers Bernard and Jean Morin), who paid their way through school selling home-made beer, and then decided to try their hand at establishing a commercial brewery. Thanks to a small loan, the company was established. The students loaded their first four kegs in the back of the family Subaru and went looking for their first client. They managed to convince four bars in Montreal to carry the brew, and the resulting surge in demand helped the company expand several times. The resulting company account for just over 1% of the total beer sales in the province of Quebec (their products are not sold outside Quebec).

The company was named after the Aurora Borealis, and the label features a polar bear above the word Boréale. It brewed the first amber style beer in Quebec. They currently brew six ale-type beers: Boréale Rousse (launched in 1988), Boréale Blonde (launched in 1990), Boréale Cuivrée, Boréale Noire, Boréale Dorée and Boréale Blanche and recently a new beer, Boréale IPA (launched in 2012). Current production is over 100,000 hL.

== Products ==
The company produces seven main brands of beer. and a few others.

== See also ==
- Beer in Quebec
- Beer in Canada
