= Le Cheval Blanc (brewpub) =

Brewpub in Montreal

- Location: Montreal, Quebec, Canada
- Opened: 1986
- Parent: Les Brasseurs RJ (since 1998)
- Distribution: Quebec
- Tasting: Yes

Active beers
La Blanche Cheval Blanc, Coup de grisou
Name	Type

Le Cheval Blanc is a brewpub located on rue Ontario in Montreal, Quebec, Canada. In 1986, it became the first licensed brewpub in Montreal.

Some of its craft beers available on tap being quite popular, in 1987 the establishment started a microbrewery of its own: La Brasserie Le Cheval Blanc, which is also said to be the city's first. In 1998, it merged with two other microbreweries Les Brasseurs GMT and Les Brasseurs de l'Anse to form Les Brasseurs RJ.

- The Cheval's bottled beers most commonly available in Quebec's dépanneurs are:
- La Blanche Cheval Blanc, traditional Belgian white, 5%
- Coup de grisou, buckwheat amber ale, spiced with coriander, refermented, 5%

In 1999, the tavern was renovated and is now also a music venue and an art gallery.

== See also ==
- Quebec beer
- Canadian beer
