= Mt. Begbie Brewing Company =

Brewery in Revelstoke, British Columbia, Canada

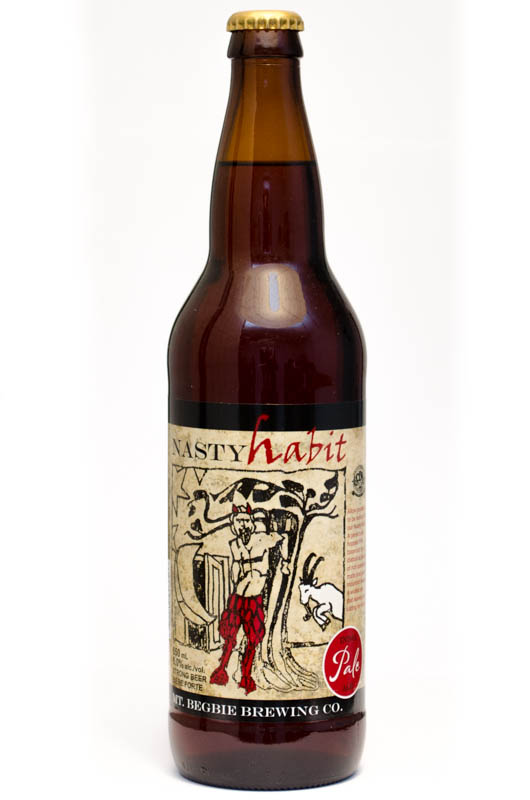
- Industry: Alcoholic beverage
- Founded: 1996
- Headquarters: Revelstoke, British Columbia, Canada
- Products: Beer
- Owner: Bart and Tracey Larson
- Number of employees: 10
- Website: mt-begbie.com

Mt. Begbie Brewing Company is a brewery in Revelstoke, British Columbia, Canada. Opened in 1996, the company is named after Mt. Begbie, a mountain in Revelstoke, which in turn was named after Matthew Baillie Begbie. As of October 2013, the brewery employs 10 full-time employees at its location in Revelstoke.

== Awards ==
=== 2013 ===
Canadian Brewing Awards

- Cream Ale - Gold - Begbie Cream Ale

=== 2012 ===
Canadian Brewing Awards

- Cream Ale - Bronze - Begbie Cream Ale

BC Beer Awards

- Session - Gold - High Country Kolsch
- Session - Bronze - Begbie Cream Ale

=== 2011 ===
Canadian Brewing Awards

- Kolsch - Gold - High Country Kolsch

=== 2010 ===
Canadian Brewing Awards

- English Style India Pale Ale - Gold - Nasty Habit IPA

=== 2007 ===
Canadian Brewing Awards

- Brown Ale - Bronze - Tall Timber Ale

== See also ==
- Beer in Canada
