= Klondike City =

Settlement near Dawson City, Yukon, Canada

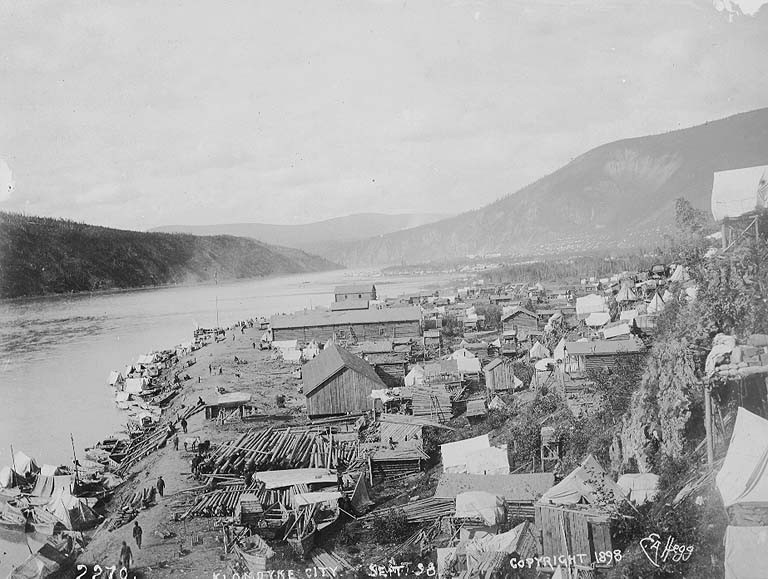
Eric A. Hegg photo of Klondike City in 1898

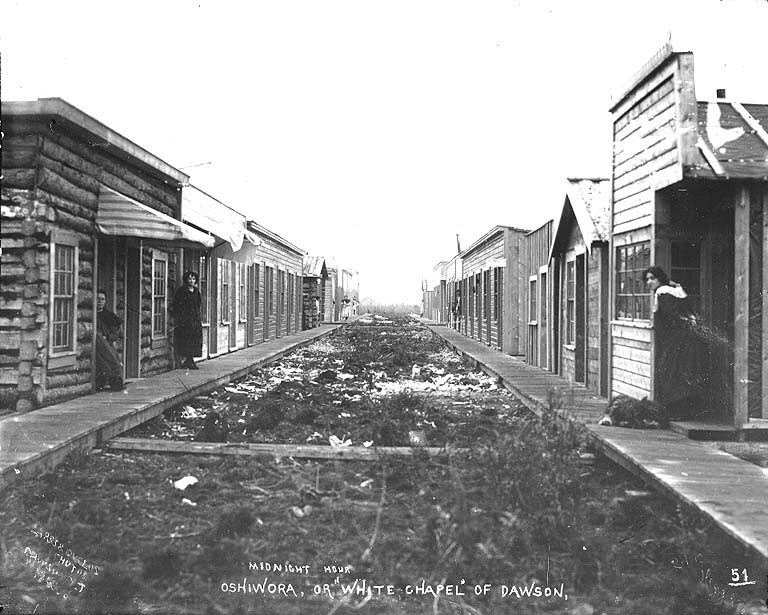
Prostitution district of Klondike City across the Klondike River from Dawson, photograph by Larss and Duclos ca. 1899

Klondike City was a Klondike gold rush era settlement on the outskirts of Dawson City in the Yukon Territory. It was renowned for prostitution. The area is mentioned in Jack London's novel White Fang. O'Brien Brewing and Malting Company was located in Klondike City. It was majority owned by Thomas W. O’Brien, who was also a landowner.

Also known as White Chapel the area had cribs where prostitution took place. The area was also nicknamed Louse Town.

== History ==
Before the gold rush the area was a Native Alaskan Hän settlement called Trochutin.
