= Les Brasseurs RJ =

Brewery in Quebec, Canada

Coordinates: 45.5338°N 73.5913°W

- Type: Private
- Industry: Alcoholic beverage
- Founded: 1998
- Founder: Roger Jaar
- Headquarters: Montreal, Quebec, Canada
- Number of locations: Head office: Montreal; Distribution centre: Quebec City; Keg brewery: L'Anse St-Jean
- Area served: Quebec
- Key people: Roger Jaar (Founder)
- Products: Beer
- Production output: 125,000 hL annually
- Number of employees: 450

Les Brasseurs RJ is a brewery located in Montreal, Quebec, Canada. The company was founded in 1998 by Roger Jaar from the merger of three microbreweries: Les Brasseurs GMT, La Brasserie Le Cheval Blanc and Les Brasseurs de l'Anse. Current annual production capacity is over 125,000 hL; they claim to be the largest microbrewery in Quebec. They currently employ 450 people, including employees at the head office in Montreal, a distribution centre in Quebec City, and a brewery in l'Anse St-Jean that fills beer kegs.

In addition to a variety of beers of their own fabrication and recipe, the microbrewery brews two d'Achouffe beers under licence and distributes the Bitburger Premium Beer, Köstritzer Schwarzbier, König Pilsner, and Wernesgrüner for the Quebec market. A portion of their sales from the "Rescousse" brand used to collect funds for the preservation of endangered species via a donation to the Fondation de la faune du Québec.

Due to the brewery's location in the Plateau-Mont-Royal borough in Montreal, and their extensive sponsorship of local events, they are known as the "Official Brewer of the Avenue" (Mount-Royal Avenue).

== See also ==
- Quebec beer
- Canadian beer
