= List of microbreweries =

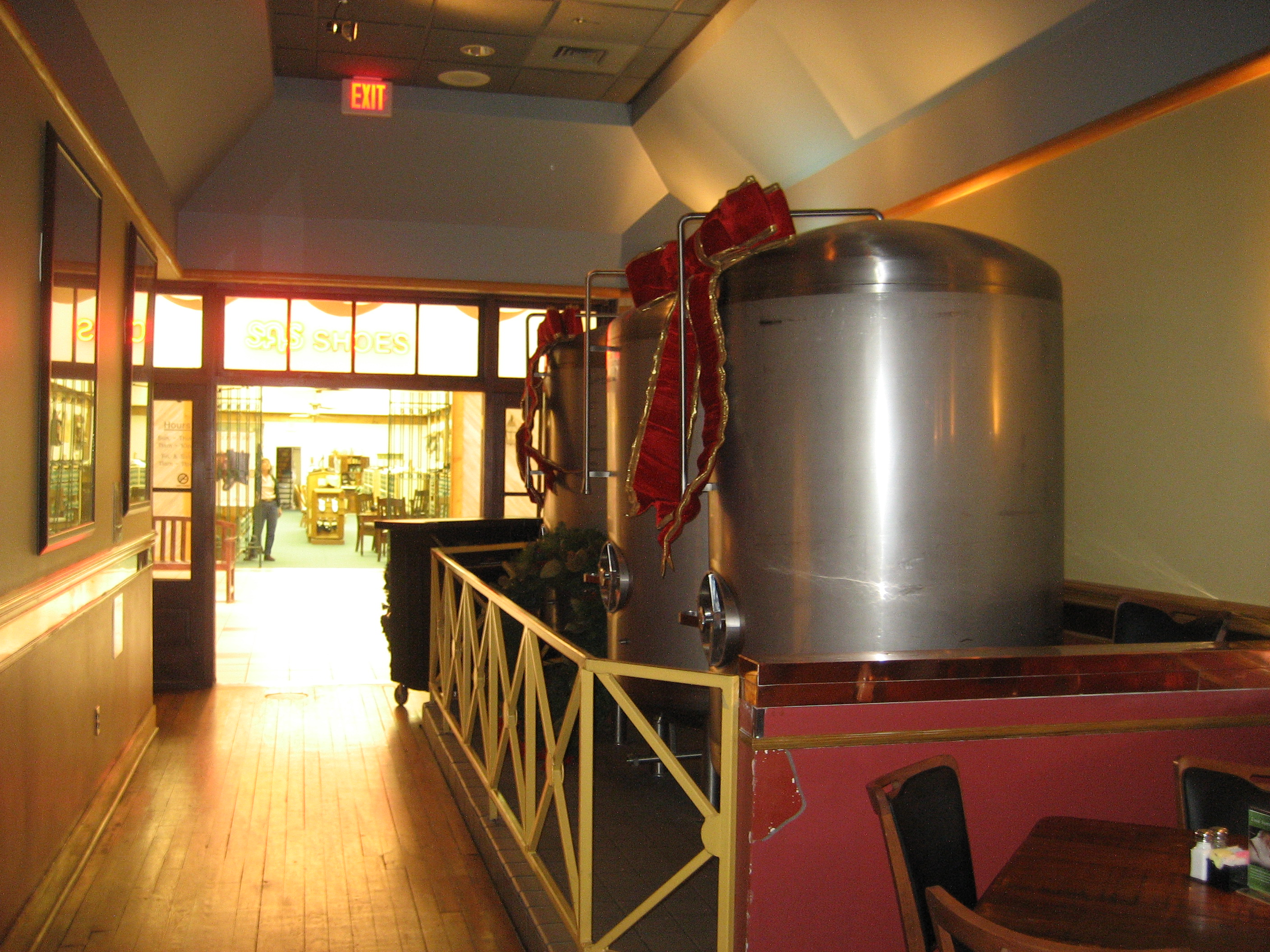
Beer brewing tanks at microbrewery and restaurant "Zea" in Metairie, Louisiana

This is a list of notable microbreweries. A microbrewery is a brewery which produces a limited amount of beer. The qualifications to be classified as a microbrewery vary by country. The term "microbrewery" originated in the United Kingdom in the late 1970s to describe the new generation of small breweries which focused on producing traditional cask ale. The first example of this approach was Selby Brewery founded by Martin Sykes in 1972 in the Yorkshire town of the same name. Although originally "microbrewery" was used in relation to the size of breweries, it gradually came to reflect an alternative attitude and approach to brewing flexibility, adaptability, experimentation, and customer service. The term and trend spread to the United States in the 1980s, where it eventually was used as a designation of breweries that produce fewer than 15,000 U.S. beer barrels (1,800,000 liters) (475,000 U.S. gallons) annually.

== Notable microbreweries ==
Located in the United States unless otherwise noted.

=== 0–9 ===
- 5 Rabbit Cervecería (founded 2009)

=== A ===
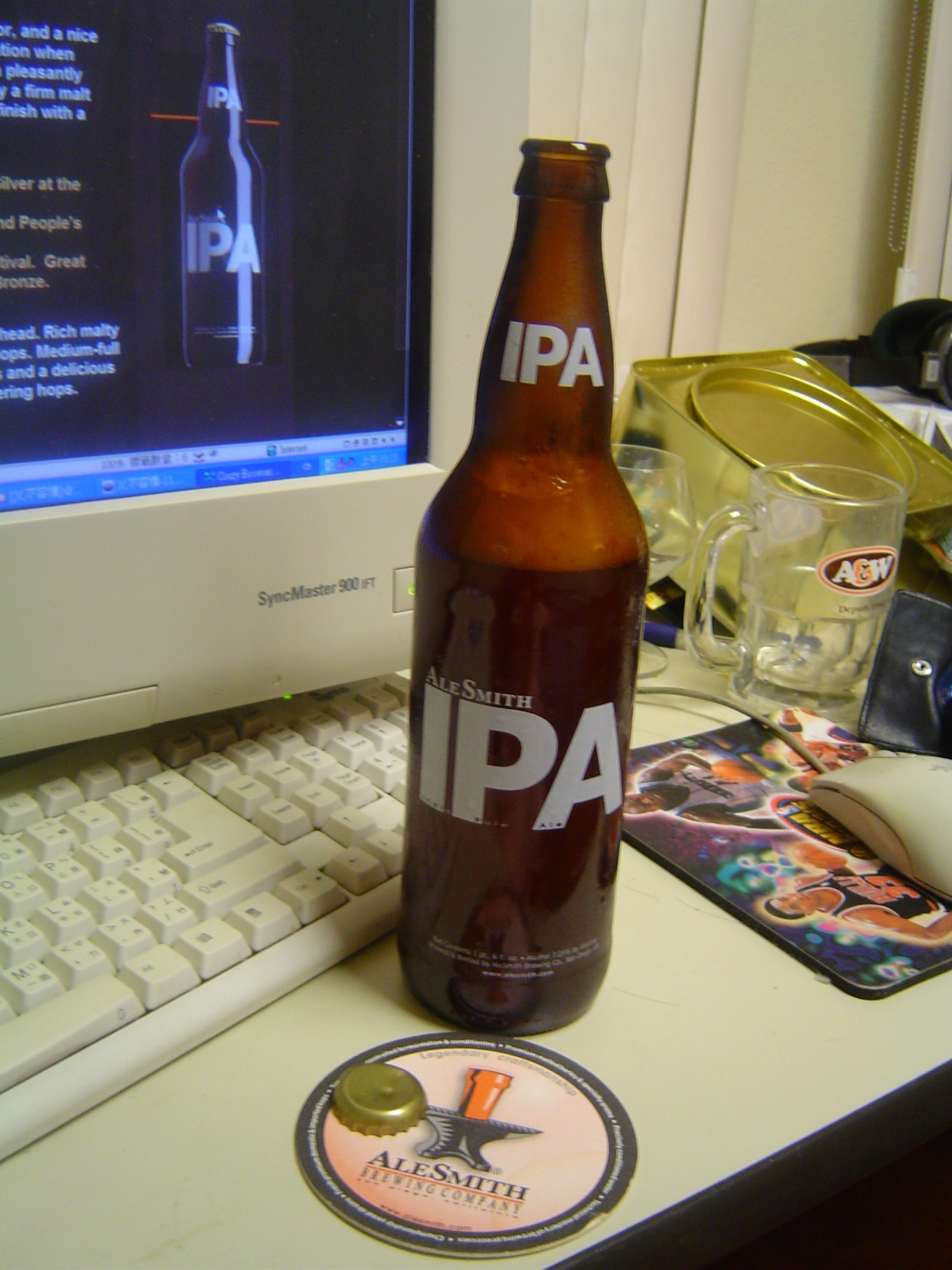
A bottle of AleSmith Brewing Company's India Pale Ale

- Abbey Brewing Company (founded 2003)
- Abita Brewing Company (founded 1986). Original location is now the Abita Brew Pub
- Agassiz Brewing (1998–2010), Winnipeg, Manitoba, Canada
- Alaskan Brewing Company (founded 1986), Juneau, Alaska
- AleSmith Brewing Company (founded 1995)
- Allagash Brewing Company (founded 1995)
- Amager Bryghus (founded 2007), Amager, Denmark
- Amsterdam Brewing Company (founded 1986), Toronto, Ontario, Canada
- Anderson Valley Brewing Company (founded 1987)
- Arcadia Brewing Company (founded 1996)
- Argus Brewery (founded 2009)

=== B ===
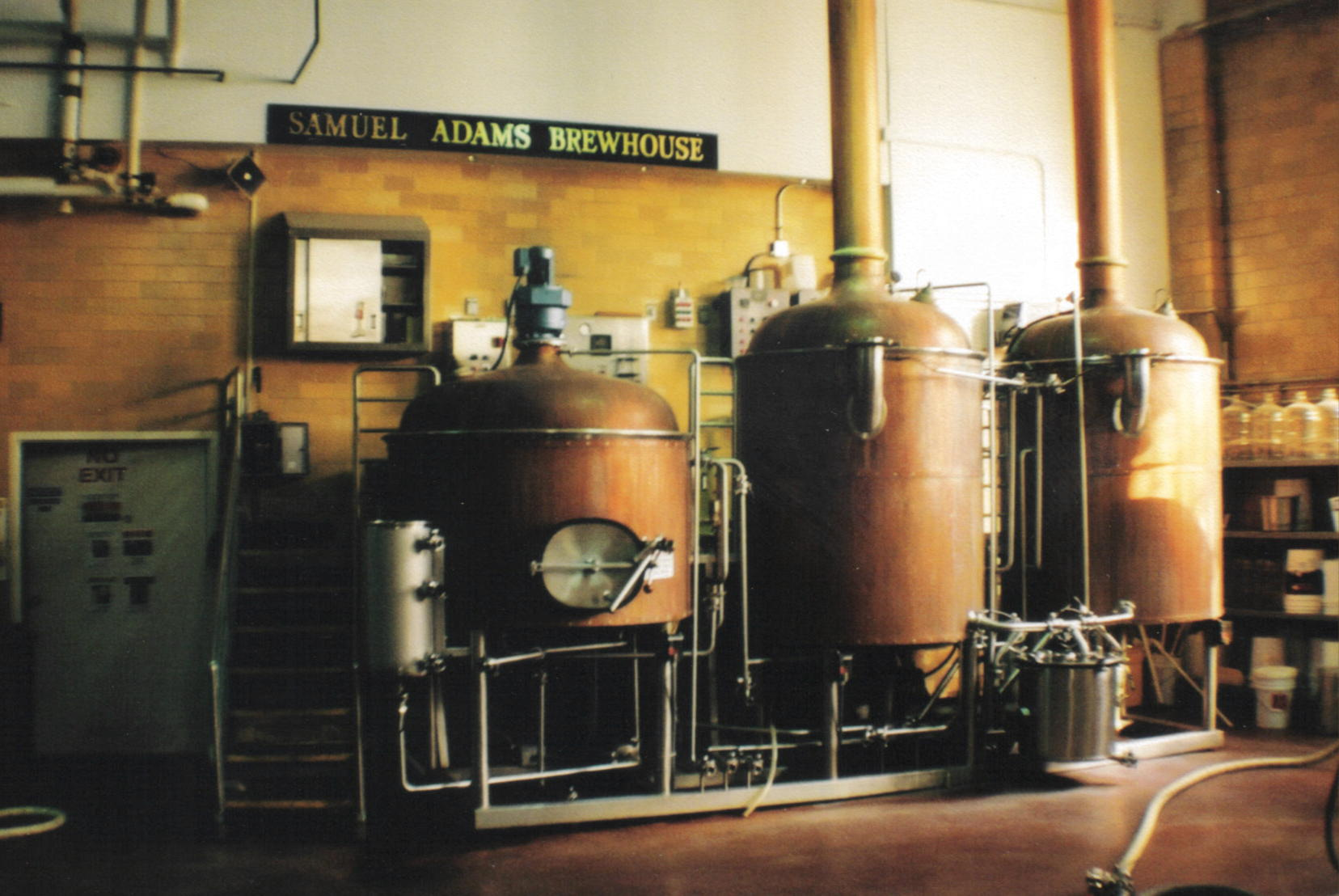
Brew kettles at the Boston Beer Company

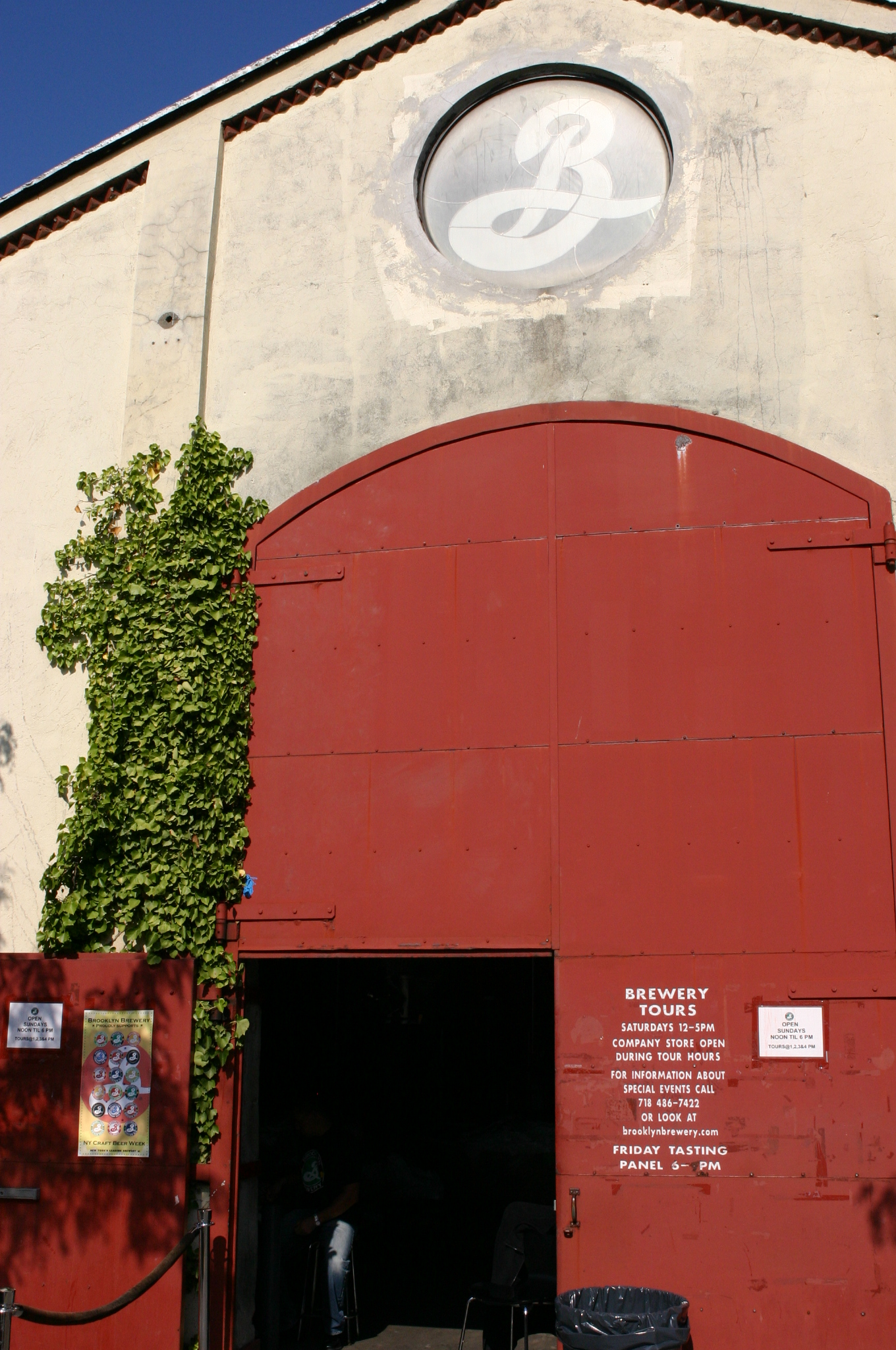
Brooklyn Brewery

- La Barberie, Quebec City, Canada
- Bayern Brewing
- Bear Republic Brewing Company
- Beau's All Natural Brewing Company
- Belgh Brasse
- Bell's Brewery
- Bent Paddle Brewing Company
- Big Al Brewing
- BJ's Restaurant & Brewery
- Blackrocks Brewery
- Blue Hills Brewery
- Blue Mountain Brewery
- Blue Point Brewing Company
- Bluegrass Brewing Company
- Bluetongue Brewery
- Bootleg Brewery
- Boston Beer Company
- Boulder Beer Company
- Boundary Bay Brewing Company
- Les Brasseurs du Nord
- Brew Keeper
- BrewDog
- Brewery Ommegang
- Brick Brewing Company
- BridgePort Brewing Company
- Brooklyn Brewery
- Buffalo Bill's Brewery
- Burleigh Brewing Company
- By The Horns Brewing Co.

=== C ===
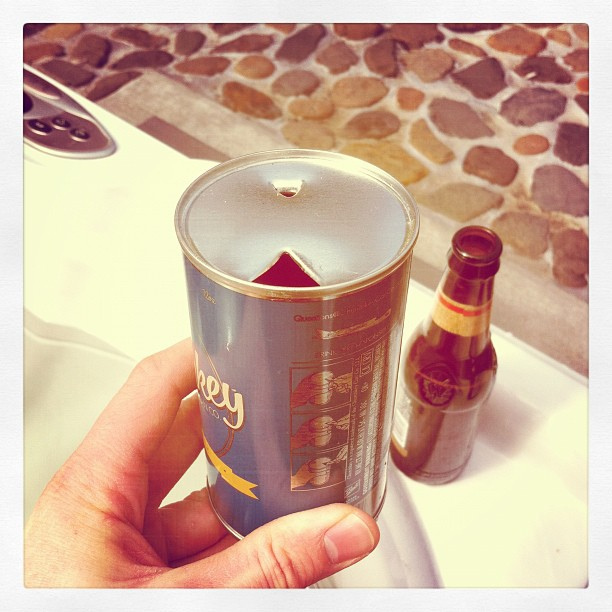
An opened Churchkey Pilsner can from the Churchkey Can Company. The brewery's name refers to its flagship beer, which must be opened using a churchkey.

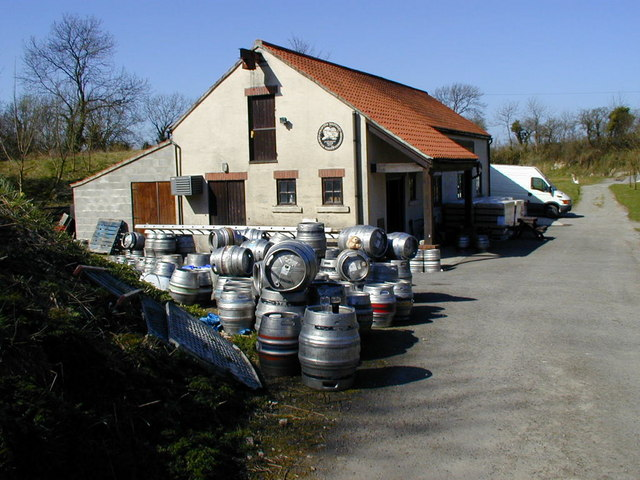
Cropton Brewery is located in Cropton, a village and civil parish in North Yorkshire, England.

- Calfkiller Brewing Company
- Cameron's Brewing Company
- Canteen Brewhouse
- Capital Brewery
- Carakale Brewing Company
- Cascade Lakes Brewing Company
- Casco Bay Brewing Co.
- Cellis Brewery
- Christian Moerlein Brewing Co.
- The Church Brew Works
- Churchkey Can Company
- Cigar City Brewing
- Coastal Extreme Brewing Company
- Colonial Brewing Company
- Creemore Springs
- Cricket Hill Brewery

=== D ===
A bottle of beer made by Dixie Brewing Company

- Dangerous Man Brewing Company
- Dark Horse Brewery
- Devils Backbone Brewing Company
- Diamond Knot Brewing Company
- Dixie Brewing Company
- Dogfish Head Brewery
- Dow Breweries
- Dragonmead
- Drake's Brewing Company
- Dugges Ale och Porterbryggeri

=== E ===
- Eden Brewery St Andrews
- Eel River Brewing Company
- Ellis Island Casino & Brewery
- Empyrean Brewing Company
- Erie Brewing Company

=== F ===
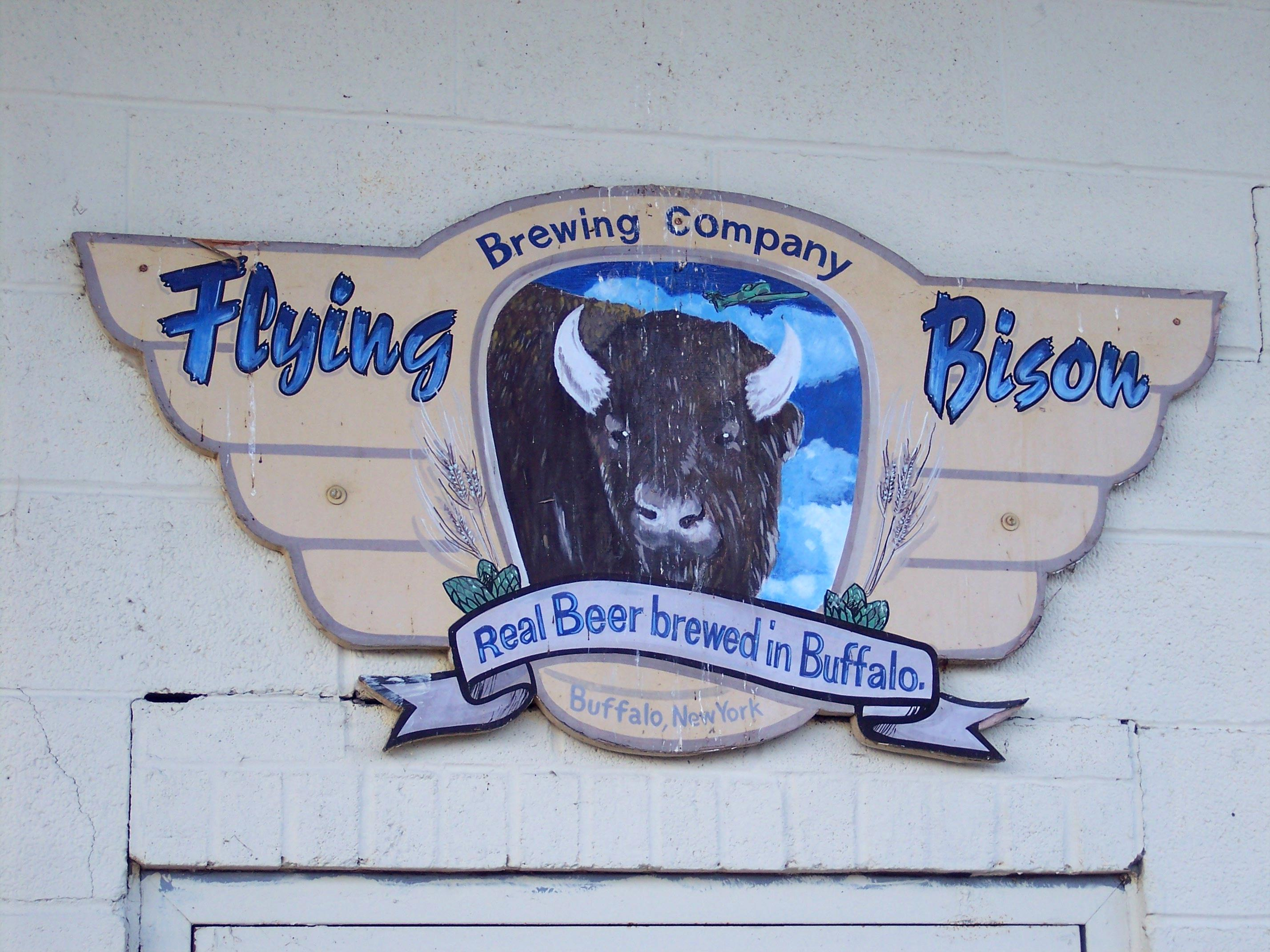
Signage for the Flying Bison Brewing Company above the rear entrance to their brewery

- F&M Brewery
- Fat Head's Brewery
- Feral Brewing Company
- Firestone Walker Brewing Company
- Fish Brewing Company
- Flying Bison Brewing Company
- Flying Dog Brewery
- Fort Garry Brewing Company
- Fort George Brewery
- Fóti Craft Brewery
- Founders Brewing Company
- Franciscan Well
- Franconia Brewing Company
- Free State Brewery
- Fremont Brewing
- Fulton Beer

=== G ===
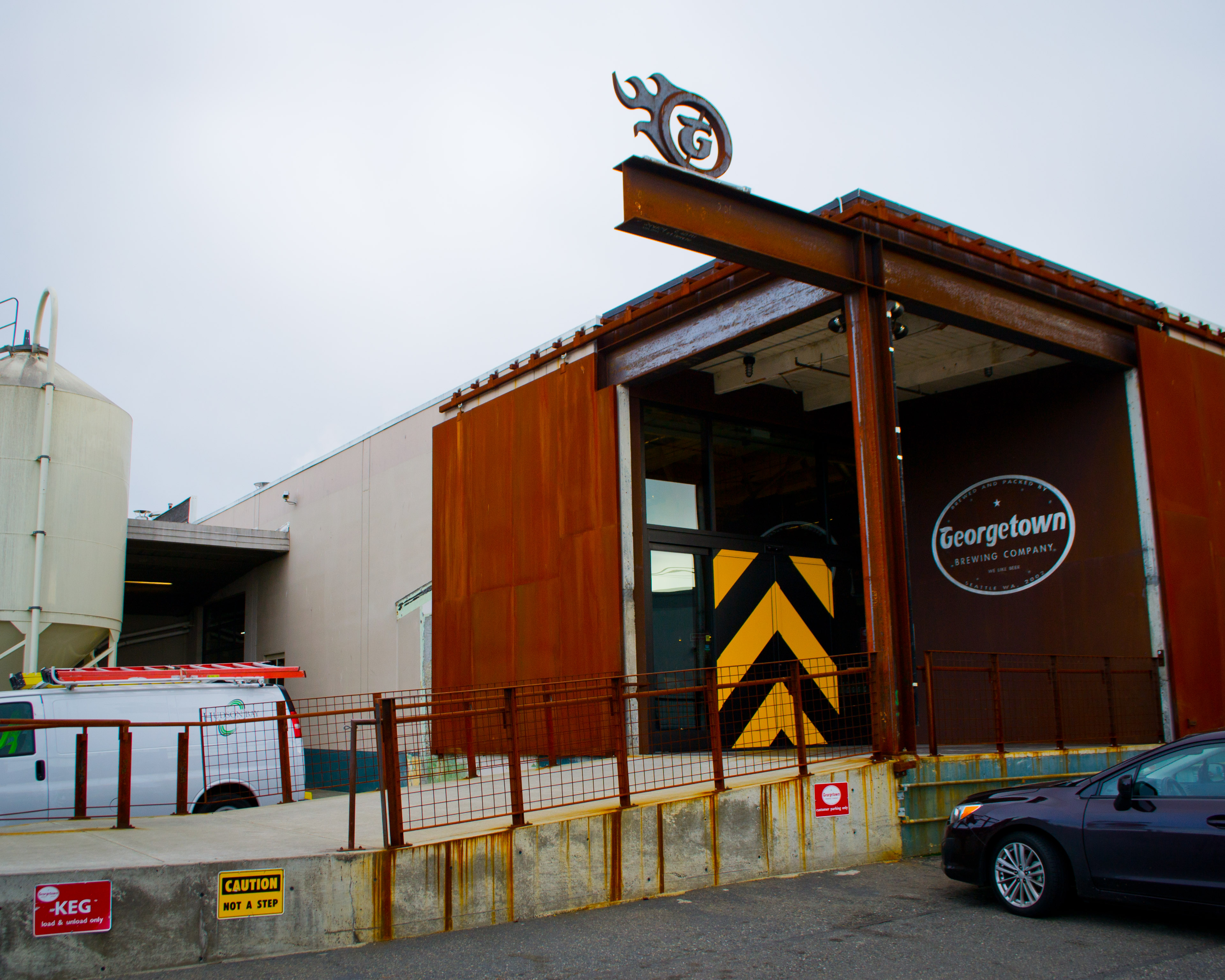
The entrance to Georgetown Brewing Company

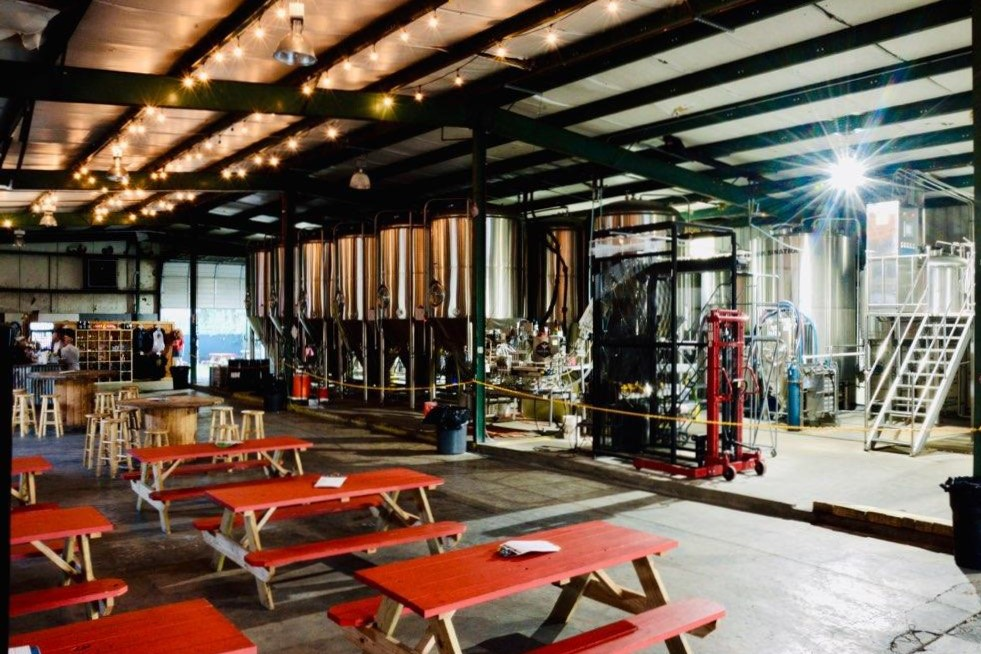
Gnarly Barley Brewing Company

- Gage Roads Brewing Company
- Georgetown Brewing Company
- Gizmo Brew Works
- Gnarly Barley Brewing Company
- Golan Brewery
- Gordon Biersch Brewing Company
- Granville Island Brewing
- Great Basin Brewing Company
- Great Lakes Brewing Company
- Great Western Brewing Company
- The Great Yorkshire Brewery
- Green Flash Brewing Company
- Greenbush Brewing Company
- Gritty McDuff's Brewing Company

=== H ===
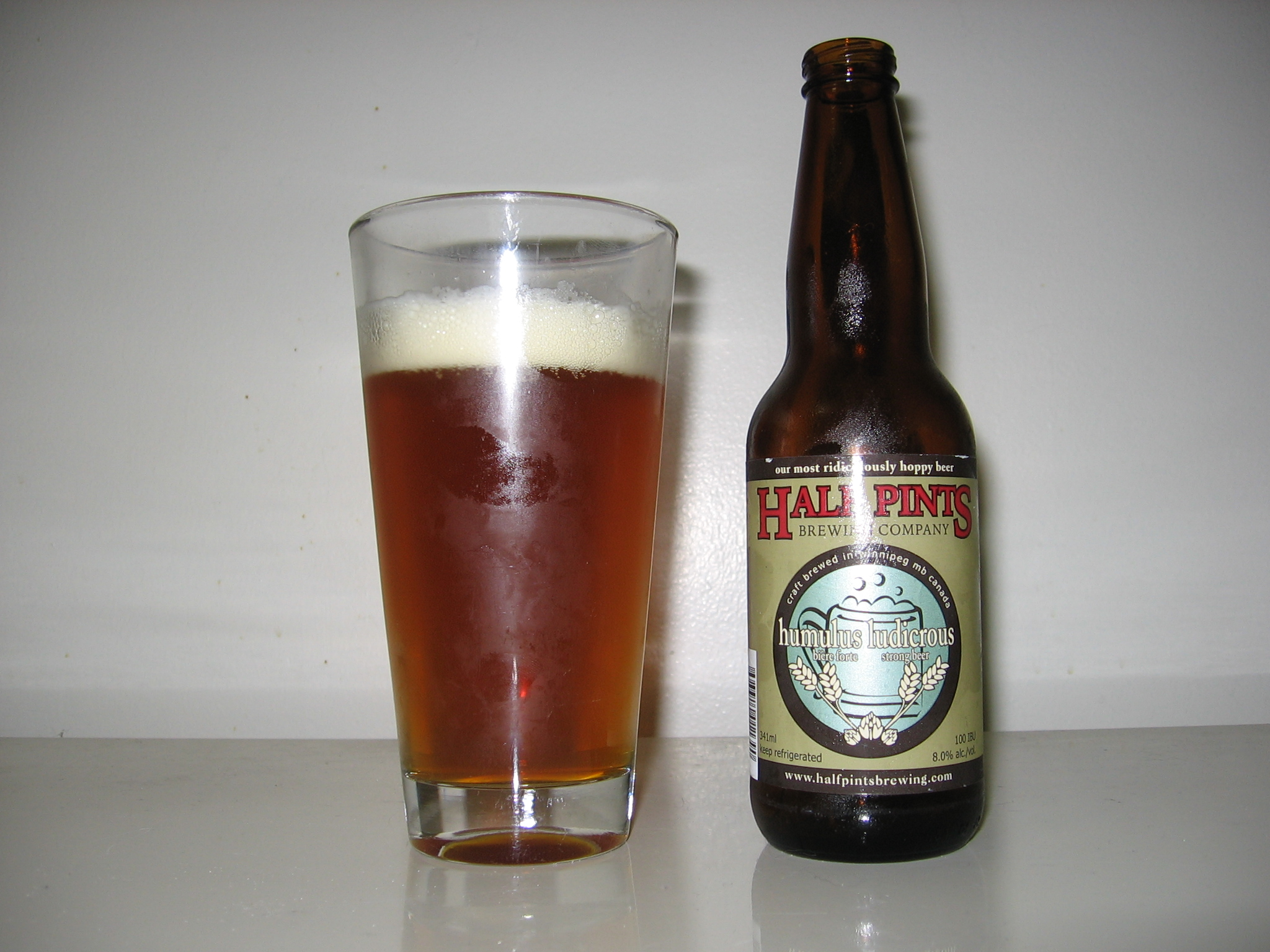
Half Pints Brewing Company's Humulus Ludicrous, an extremely hoppy double IPA, with a published bitterness rating of 100 International Bitterness Units (IBU)

- Hair of the Dog Brewing Company
- Hale's Ales
- Half Acre Beer Company
- Half Pints Brewing Company
- Hamburger Mary's
- Harpoon Brewery
- Hawaii Nui Brewing Company
- Hilliard's Beer
- Hogs Back Brewery
- Hop Back Brewery
- Holgate Brewhouse
- Holy Cow Casino and Brewery

=== I ===
- Ice Harbor Brewing Company
- Indeed Brewing Company

=== J ===
- Jackie O's Pub & Brewery
- Jarrow Brewing Company
- Jing-A Brewing Co.
- Jolly Pumpkin Artisan Ales

=== K ===
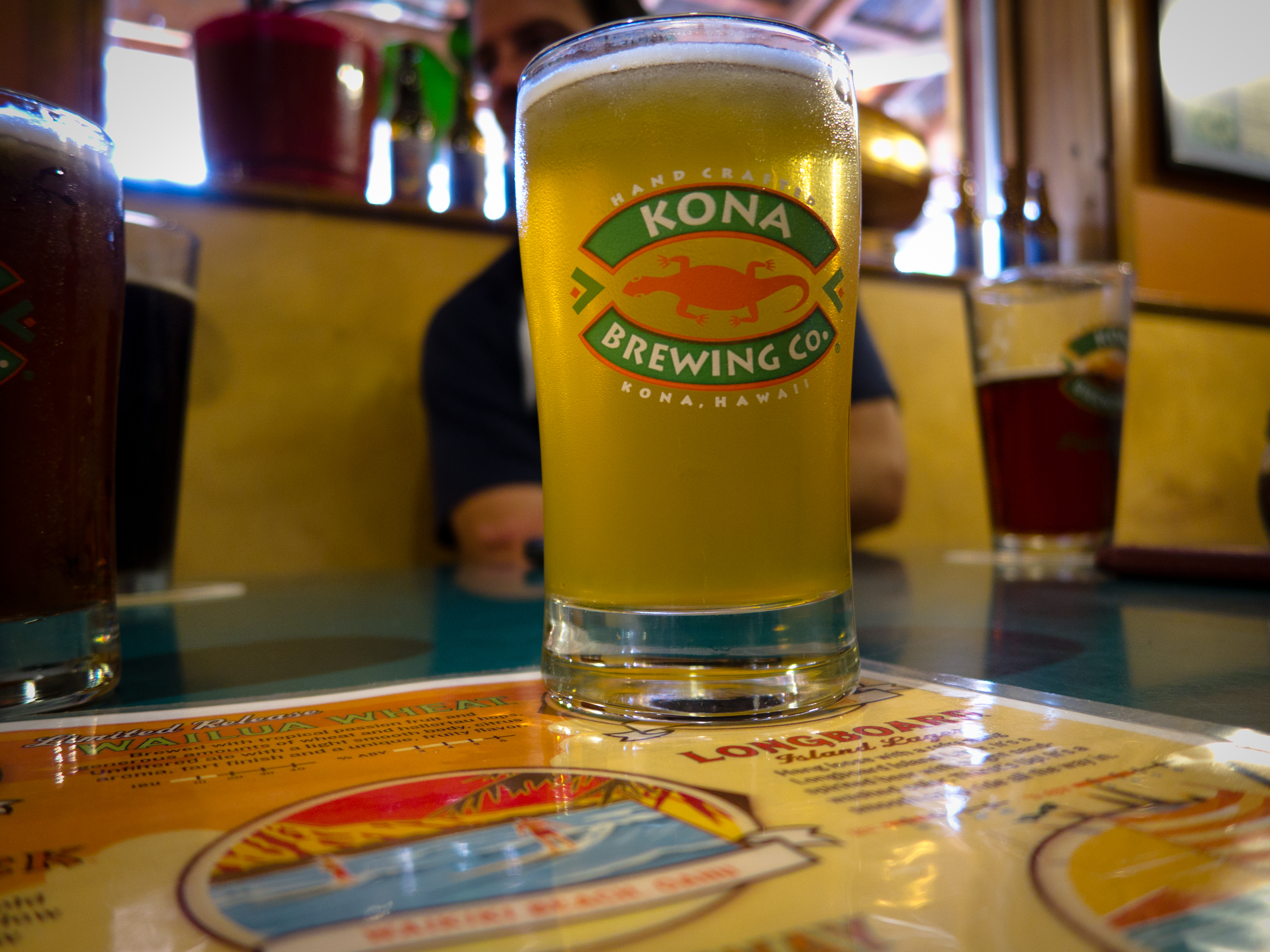
Kona Brewing Company

- King Brewery
- Kingdom Breweries
- Keweenaw Brewing Company
- Kona Brewing Company
- Kuhnhenn Brewing Company

=== L ===
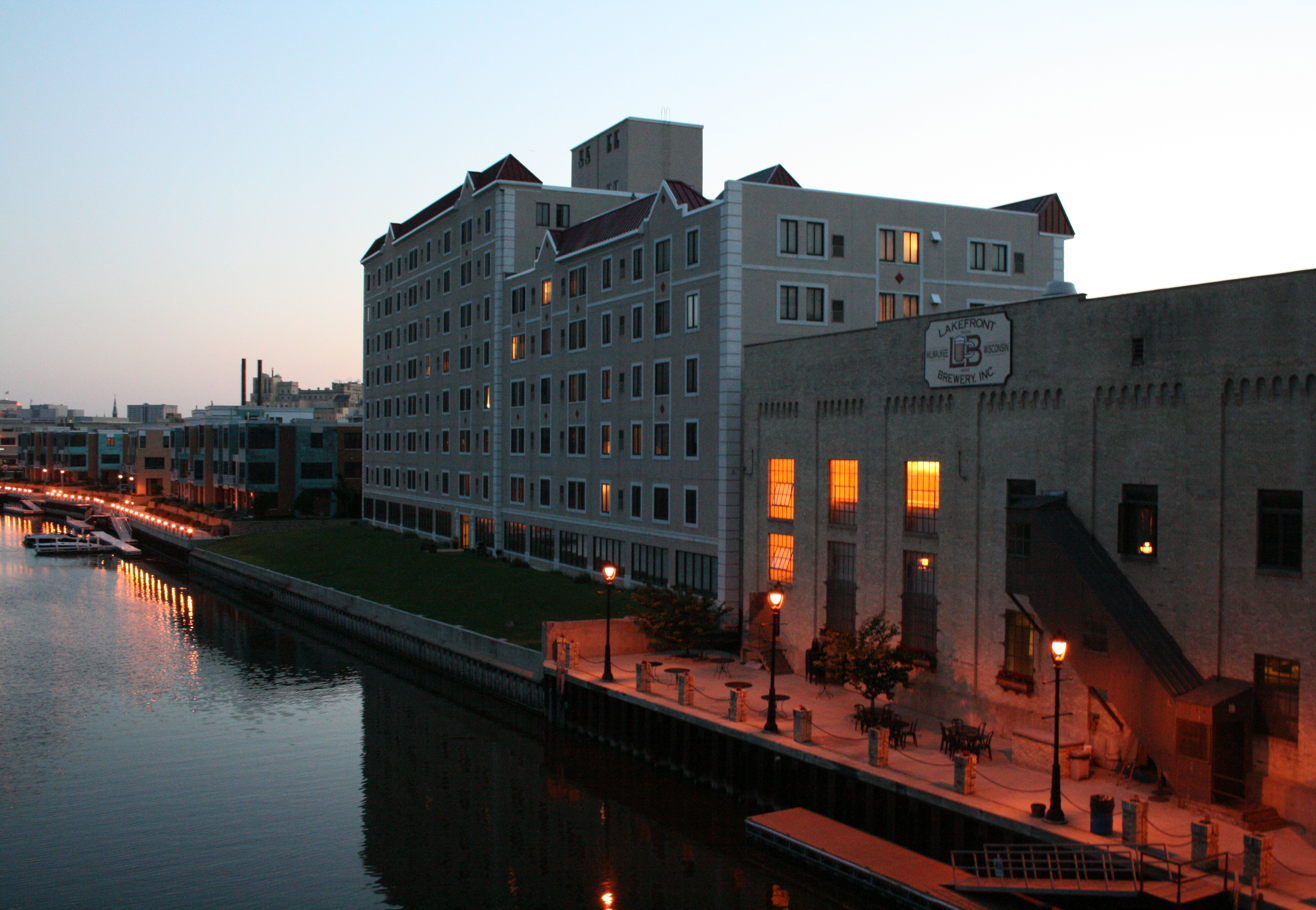
The back of Lakefront Brewery (and Brewers' Point Apartments) along the Milwaukee River

- Lacons Brewery
- Lagunitas Brewing Company
- Lakefront Brewery (founded in 1987)
- Lakeport Brewing Company
- Little Creatures Brewery
- Lobethal Bierhaus
- London Fields Brewery
- Lone Tree Brewery
- Long Trail Brewing Company
- Lost Coast Brewery
- Lost Rhino Brewing Company

=== M ===
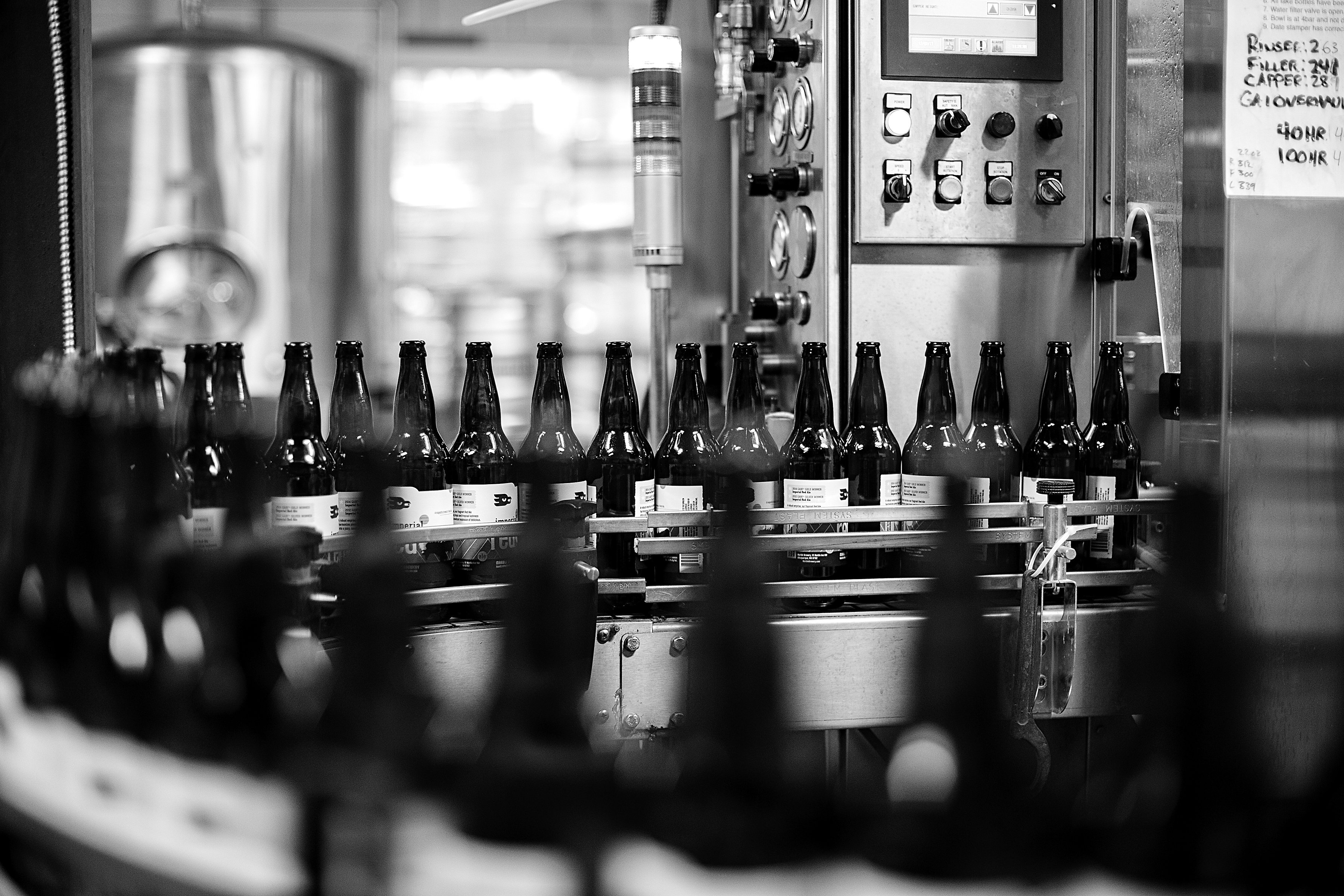
Marble Brewery, New Mexico

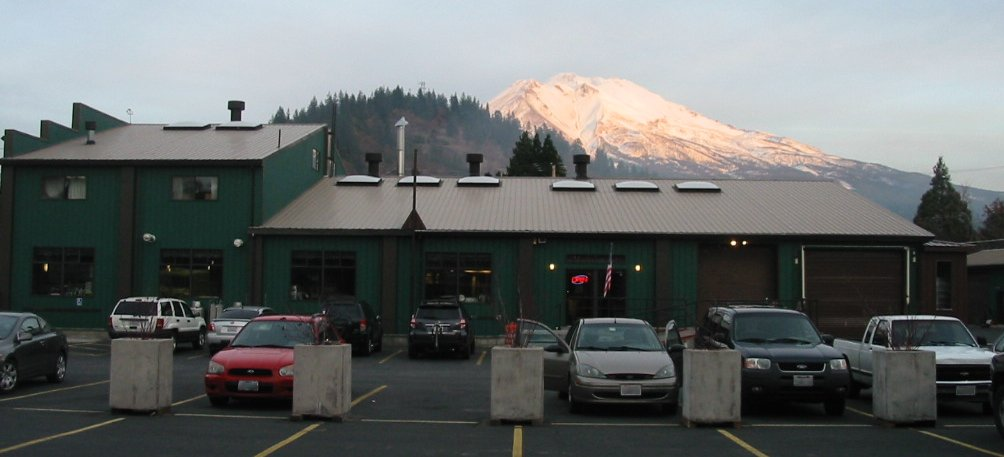
Mount Shasta stands to the east of Mt. Shasta Brewing Company.

- Mad River Brewing Company
- Main Street Station Hotel and Casino and Brewery
- Malt Shovel Brewery
- Mammoth Brewing Company
- Marble Brewery
- Marshall Brewing Company
- Matilda Bay Brewing Company
- Matt Brewing Company
- McAuslan Brewing
- McMenamins
- Mendocino Brewing Company
- Metropolitan Brewing
- Michigan Brewing Company
- Midnight Sun Brewing Company
- Mikkeller
- Mill Street Brewery
- Milwaukee Brewing Company (founded in 1997)
- Mt. Begbie Brewing Company
- Mount Hope Estate
- Mt. Shasta Brewing Company
- Muskoka Cottage Brewery

=== N ===
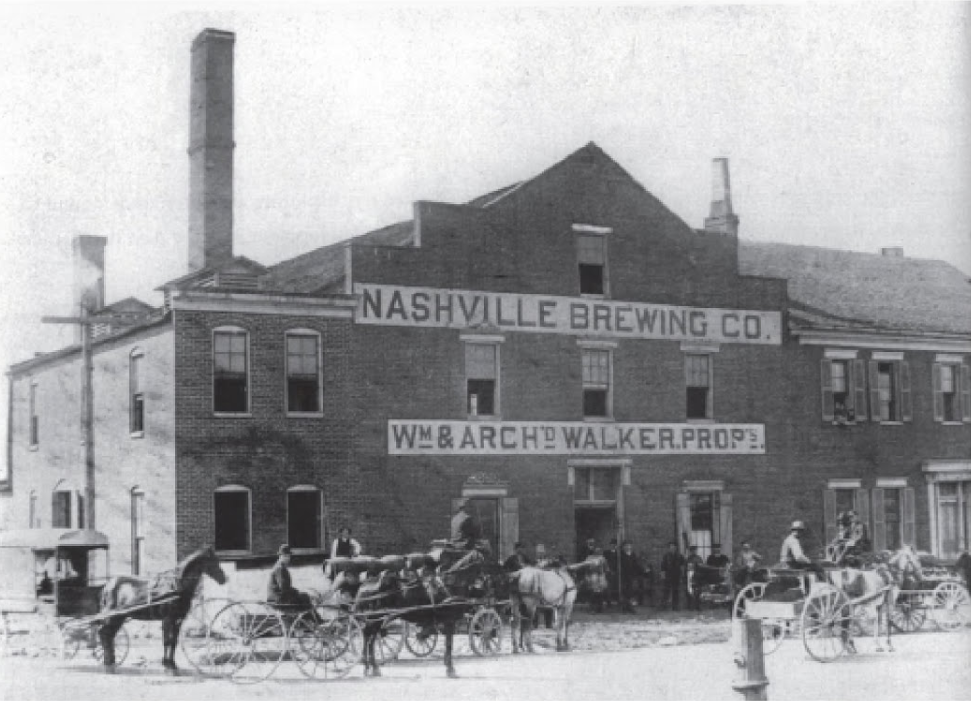
Old Nashville Brewing Company facility circa 1885

- Nail Brewing
- Nashville Brewing Company
- Nelson Brewing Company
- New Belgium Brewing Company
- New Glarus Brewing Company
- New Orleans Lager and Ale Brewing Company
- Newburyport Brewing Company
- Ninkasi Brewing Company
- North Coast Brewing Company

=== O ===
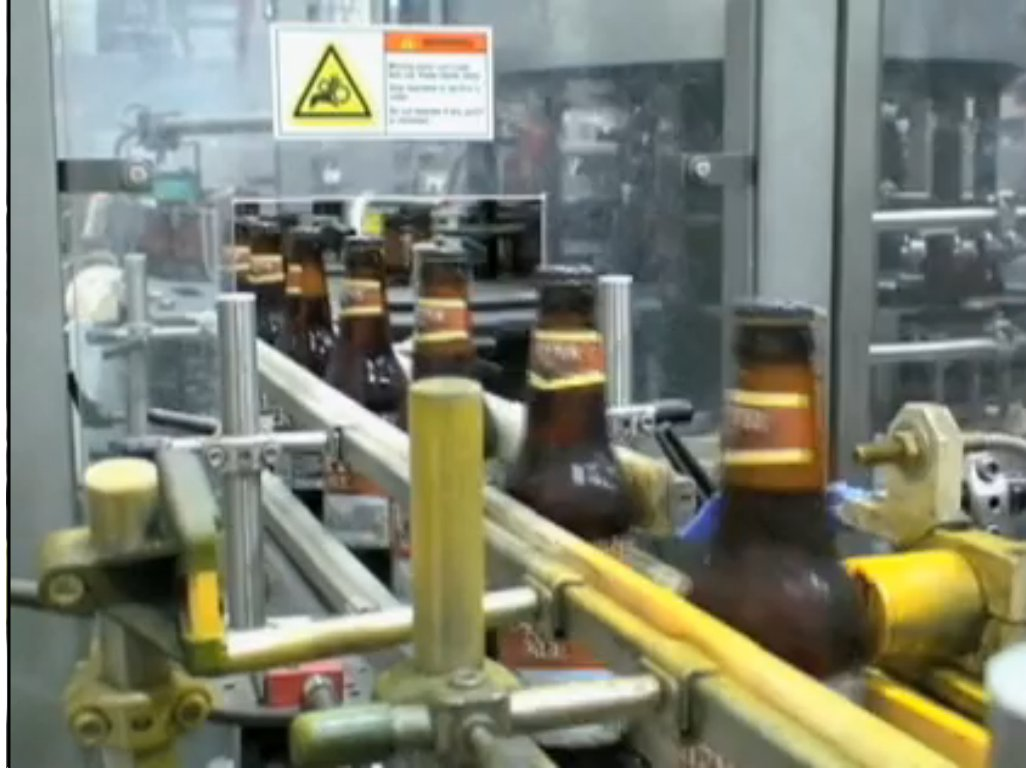
Part of Otter Creek Brewing's production line

- Off Color Brewing
- Ore Dock Brewing Company
- Otter Creek Brewing

=== P ===
- Paddock Wood Brewing Company
- Penn Brewery
- Penpont Brewery
- Pipeworks Brewing
- Port City Brewing Company
- Portland Brewing Company
- Primo Brewing & Malting Company
- Pyramid Breweries

=== Q ===
- Quidi Vidi Brewing Company

=== R ===
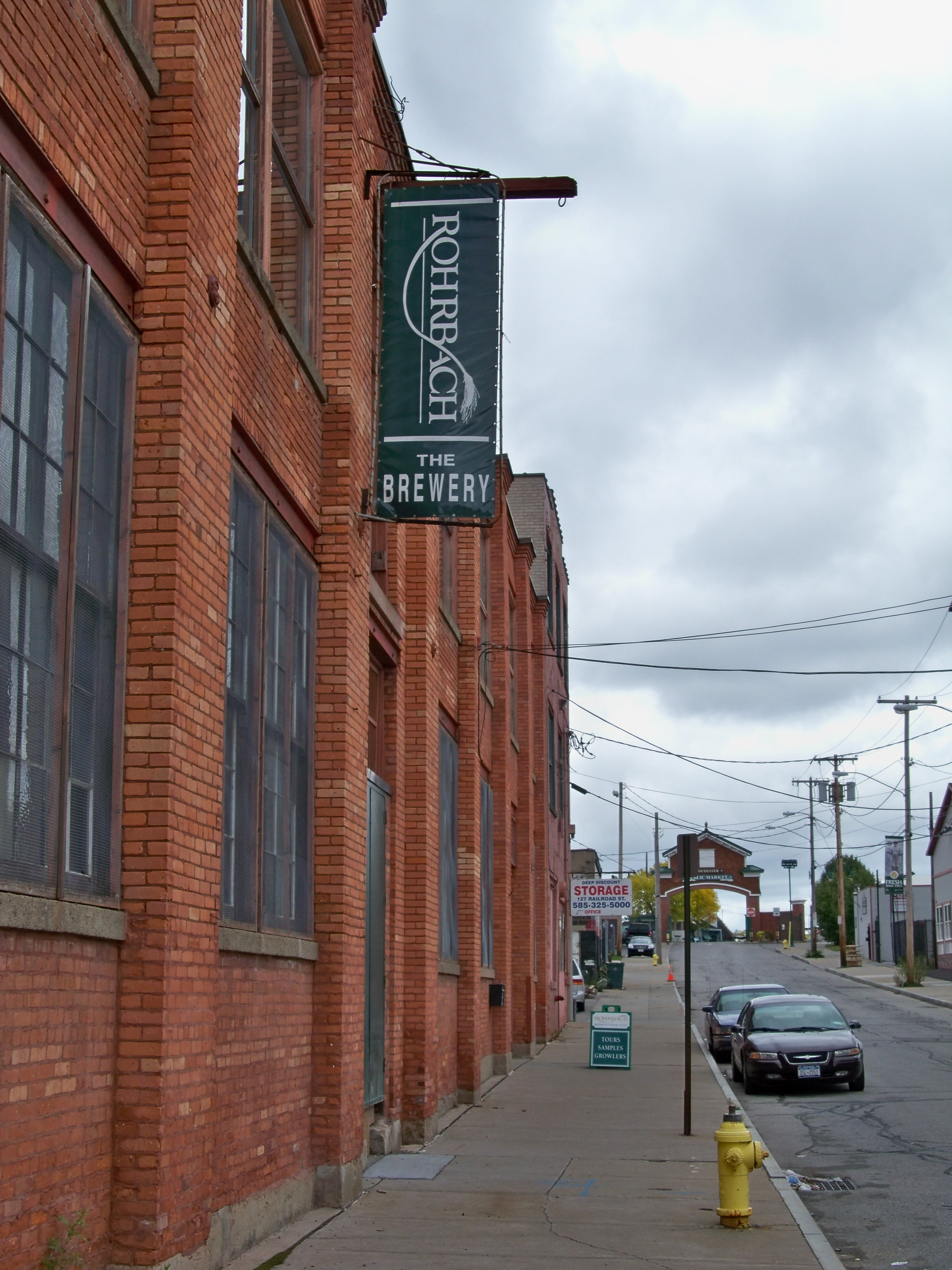
Rohrbach Brewing Company

- Rahr and Sons Brewing Company
- The Rare Barrel
- Real Ale Brewing Company
- Rebellion Beer Company
- Redhook Ale Brewery
- Red Oak Brewery
- Revolution Brewing (Illinois)
- Revolution Brewing (Colorado)
- RJ Rockers Brewing Company
- Rock Art Brewery
- Rock Bottom Restaurants
- Rogue Ales
- Rohrbach Brewing Company
- Russell Brewing Company
- Russian River Brewing Company

=== S ===
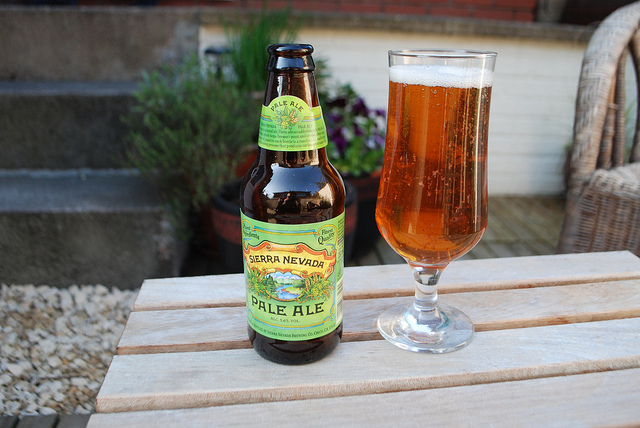
Sierra Nevada Brewing Company

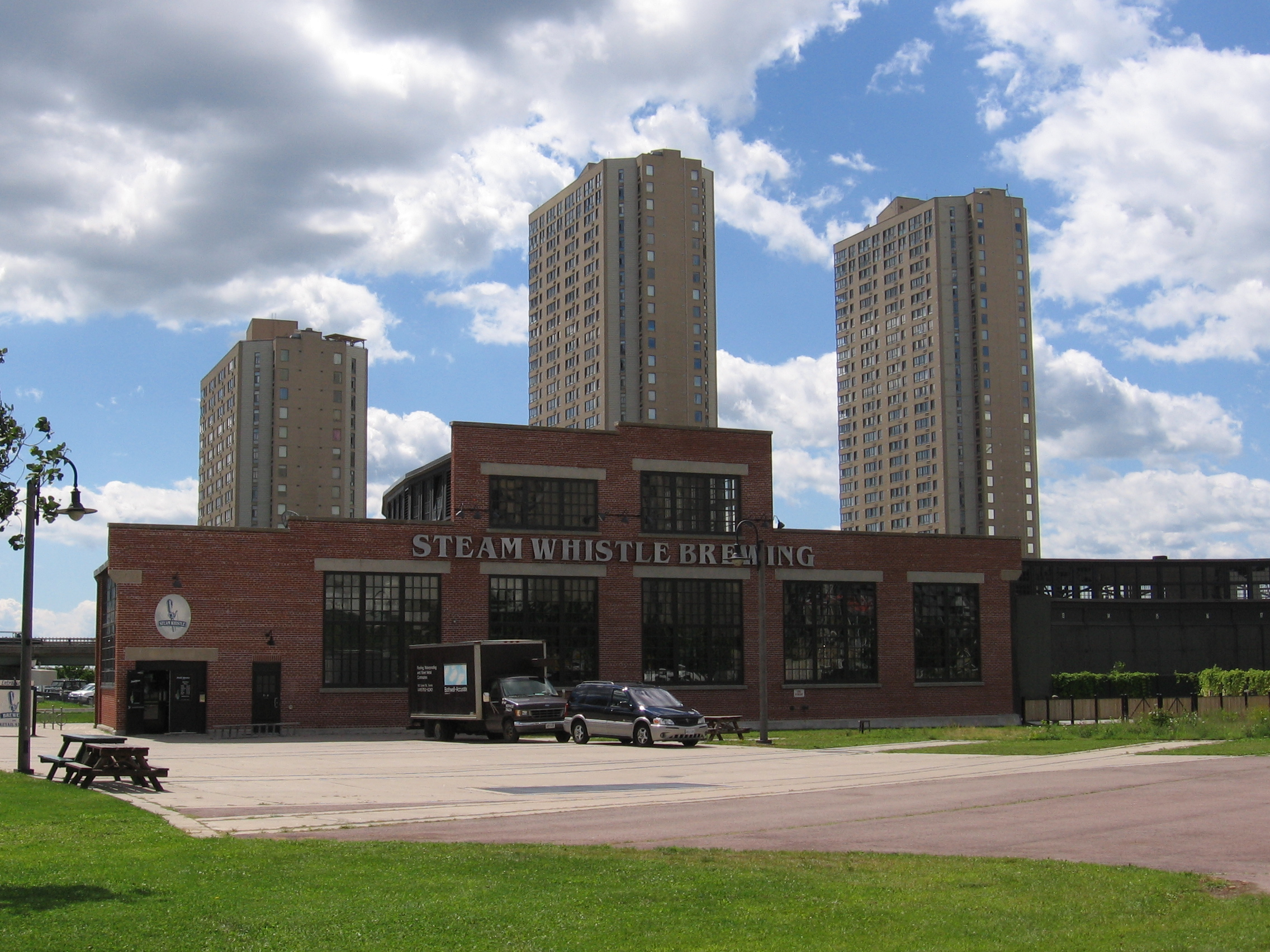
Steam Whistle Brewing

- Saint Arnold Brewing Company
- St Arnou
- Saint Louis Brewery
- San Francisco Brewing Company
- Santa Fe Brewing Company
- Saranac
- Shipyard Brewing Company
- Shmaltz Brewing Company
- Sierra Nevada Brewing Company
- Silver Gulch Brewing & Bottling Company
- Sixpoint Brewery
- SKA Brewing
- Small Town Brewery
- Smuttynose Brewing Company
- Southern Star Brewing Company
- Speakeasy Ales and Lagers
- Sprecher Brewery (founded in 1985)
- Steam Whistle Brewing
- Steelback Brewery
- Surly Brewing Company

=== T ===
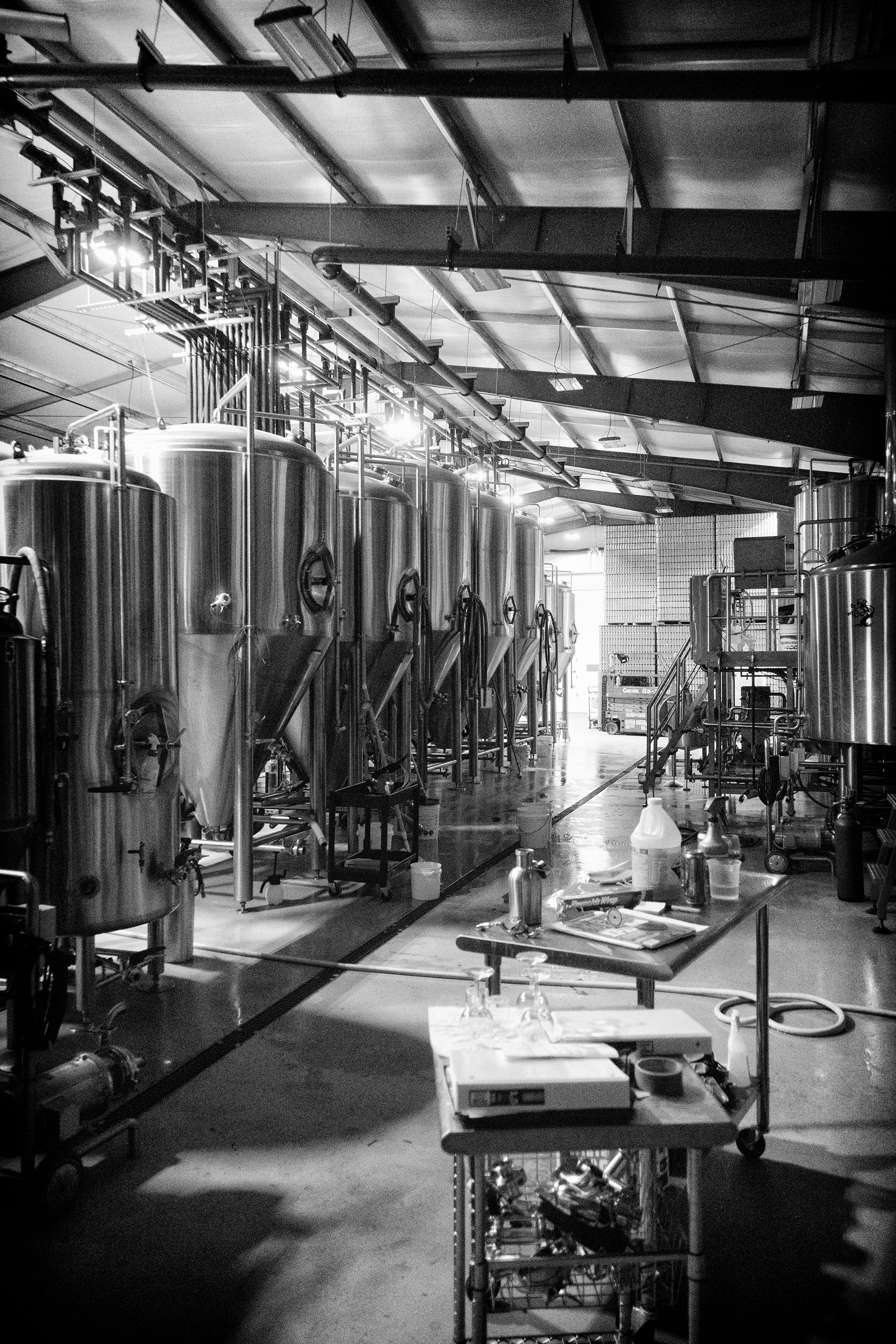
Tree House Brewing Company

- Terrapin Beer Company
- Third Street Aleworks
- Three Floyds Brewing
- Tired Hands Brewing Company
- Tractor Brewing Company
- Tree House Brewing Company
- Tring Brewery
- Trouble Brewing
- Trout River Brewing
- Tuckerman Brewing Company
- Two Brothers Brewing
- Twickenham Fine Ales

=== U ===
- Upland Brewing Company
- Upper Canada Brewing Company
- Upslope Brewing Company

=== V ===
- Victory Brewing Company

=== W ===
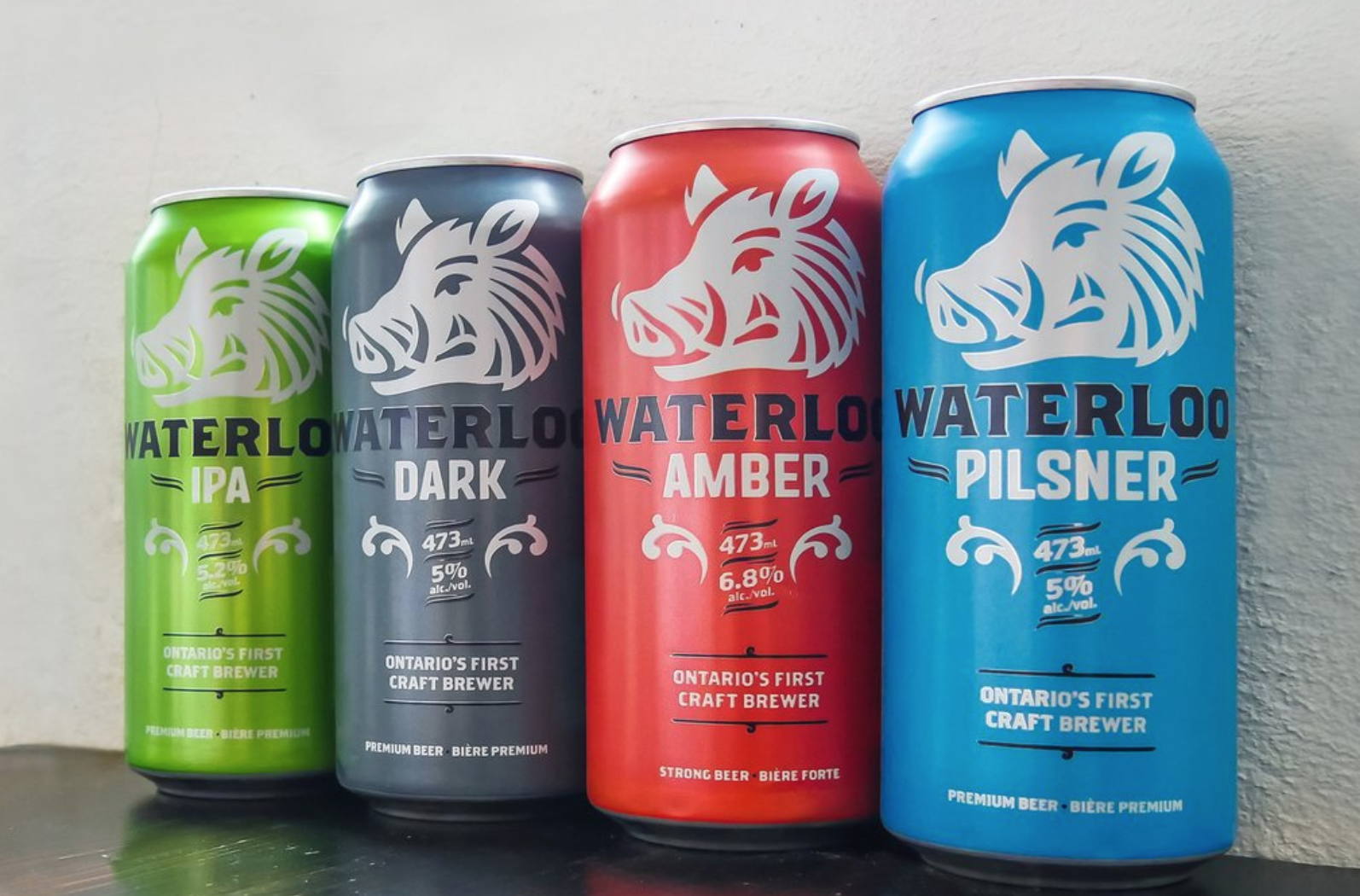
Waterloo Brewing Company cans

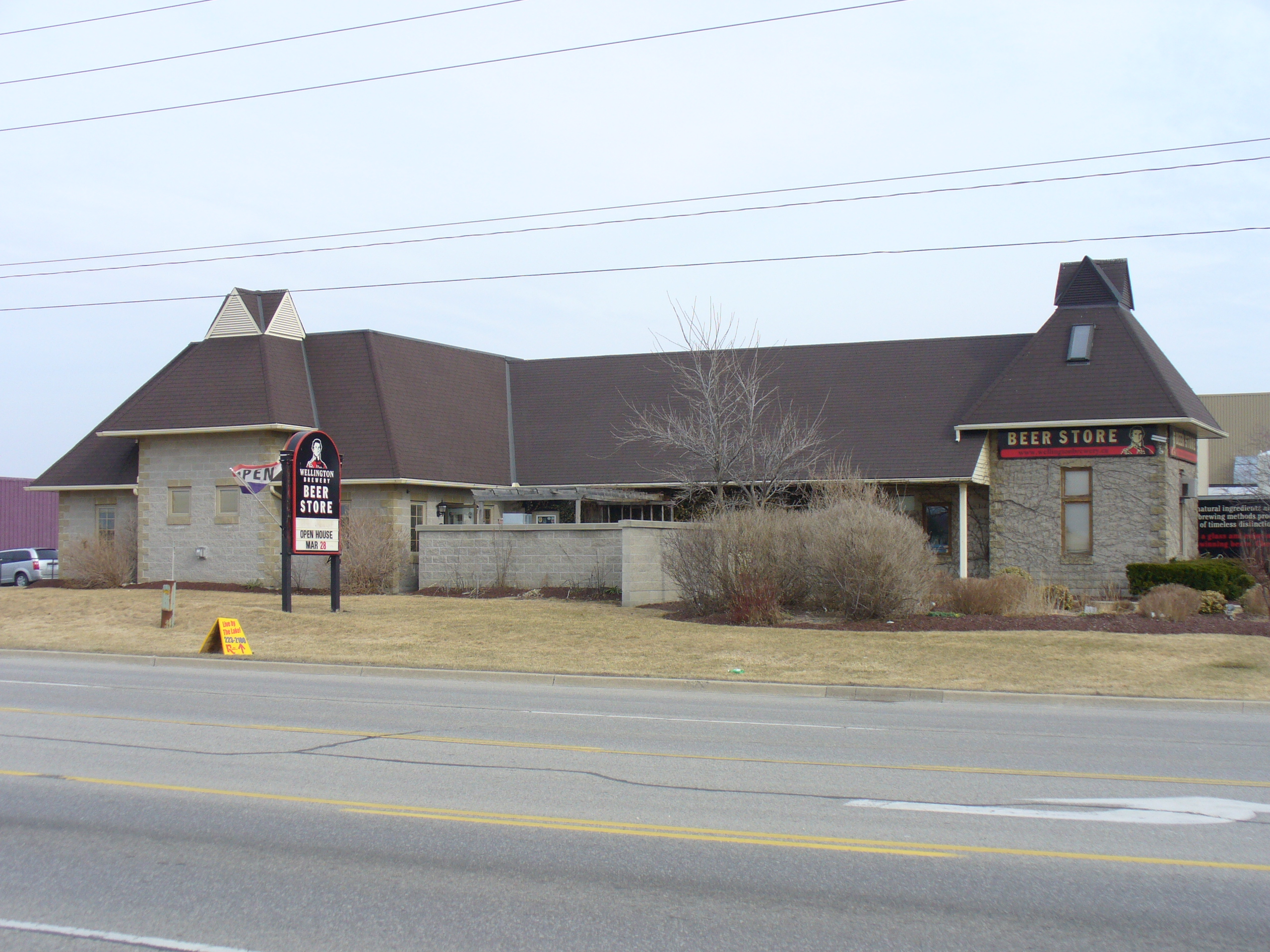
Wellington Brewery in Guelph, Ontario

- Wachusett Brewing Company
- Walkerville Brewing Company
- War Horse Brewing Company
- Wellington Brewery
- Weyerbacher Brewing Company
- White Marsh Brewing Company
- Whitewater Brewery
- Wild Rose Brewery
- Williamsburg AleWerks

=== X ===
- XT Brewing Company

=== Y ===
- Yakima Brewing & Malting Co.
- Yards Brewing Company
- Yazoo Brewing Company
- Yukon Brewing Company

== See also ==
- Beer and breweries by region
- Gypsy brewer
- Homebrewing
- List of bars
- List of countries by beer consumption per capita
- List of defunct breweries in the United States
- List of public house topics
- Lists of breweries
- Microdistilling
