= Empyrean (disambiguation) =

The Empyrean was the highest heaven in ancient cosmologies.

Empyrean may also refer to:

- The Empyrean (Paradiso), the abode of God in Paradiso, the final book of Dante's The Divine Comedy
- Empyrean Brewing Company, a brewery located in Lincoln, Nebraska
- Empyrean, the third album by Mechina
- Empyrean, the fifth album by Fallujah
- Empyrean, the thirteenth track of the 2007 Mike Oldfield's orchestral album, Music of the Spheres
- Empyrean, the eighth track of Max Cooper's 2014 album Human
- The Empyrean, John Frusciante's eighth solo record
- The Empyrean, a series of fantasy novels by Rebecca Yarros, beginning with Fourth Wing
- Empyrean Technology, an EDA and services provider to the global semiconductor industry.
