= Revolution Brewing (Colorado) =

- Location: Paonia, Colorado
- Opened: 2008
- Key people: Rudy Rodriquez, head brewer Oogie McGuire, chief operating officer
- Website: revolution-brewing.com

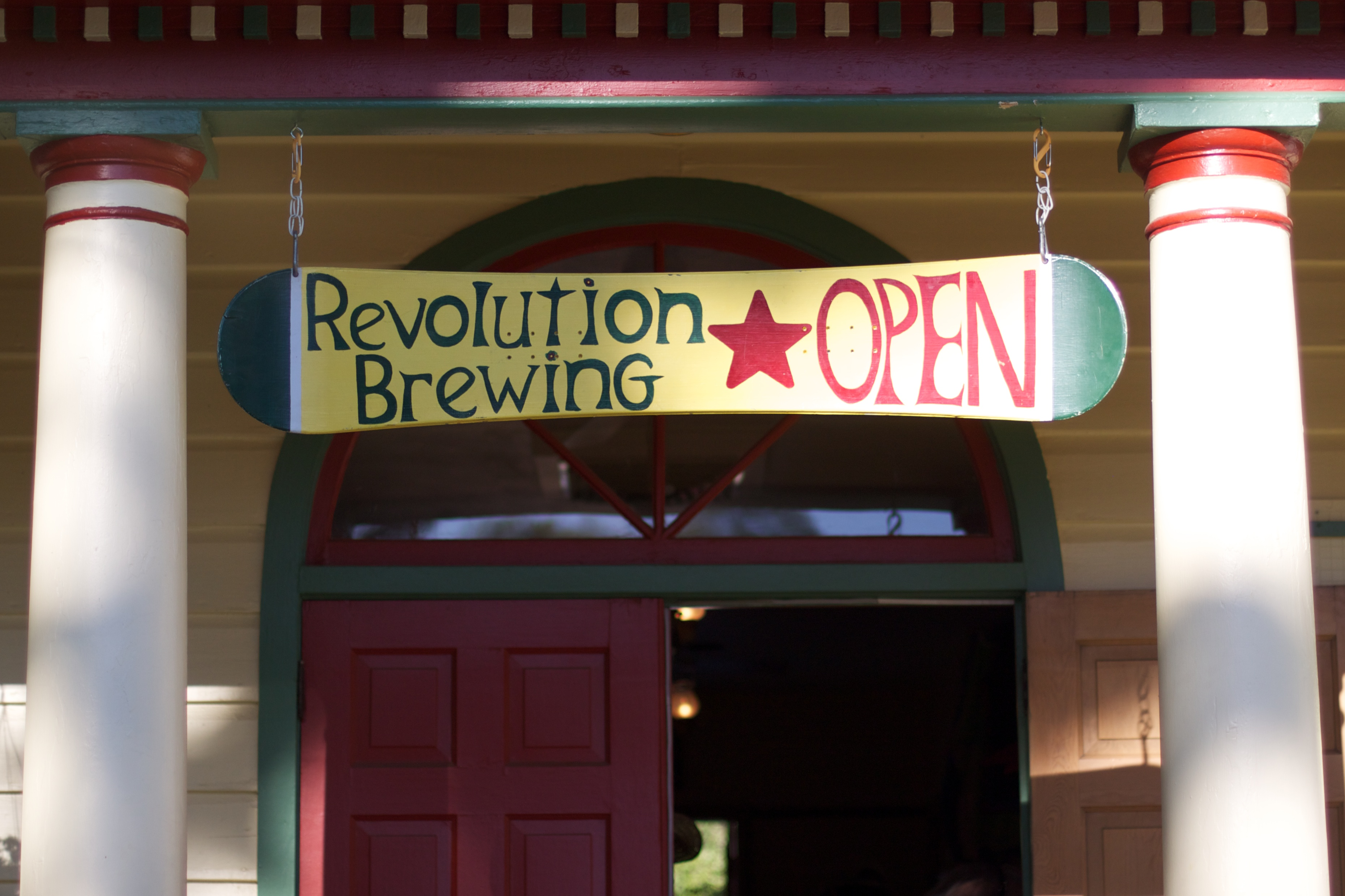
The entrance to the Revolution Brewing tasting room in 2011. The sign is painted on a snowboard.

Revolution Brewing was a microbrewery in Paonia, Colorado.

Revolution Brewing was founded in 2008 by Mike and Gretchen King and was owned by local community members. Originally the brewery used a 3/4-barrel brewing system. Later it used a six-barrel system. Some of the beer was sold in a tasting room down the street from the brewery, some was available on tap at local restaurants, and some was distributed in cans. The beer was not filtered or pasteurized. It was made with water from nearby Mount Lamborn. In 2018 the brewery was bought out by the Paonia United Brewing Company.

== Beers ==
Revolution Brewing made a number of different beers.

Year-round

- Miner's Gold golden ale
- Colorado Red Ale
- Stout Ol' Friend
- SEIPA
- Scottish

Seasonal

- Pumpkin Ale
- Lavender IPA
- Cherry IPA
- The "20 Can" Summer Ale
- Light Lager
- Octoberfest

== See also ==
- List of microbreweries
