= Dragonmead =

- Dragonmead logo
- Interactive map of Dragonmead
- Location: 4600 E. 11 Mile Road; I-696 Service Drive, Warren, Michigan 48089, U.S. 42.490908°N 83.060446°W
- Opened: 1997
- Key people: Larry Channel, Bill Wrobel, Earl Scherbarth
- Owner: Earl Scherbarth; Larry Channel; Bill Wrobel
- Employees: 27
- Website: www.dragonmead.com

Dragonmead is a U.S. microbrewery, meadery and brewpub founded by Earl Scherbarth, Larry Channell, and Bill Wrobel in January 1997. The small brewery produces many varieties of beer, wine, and mead, and has received awards including gold medals at the World Beer Cup.

== History ==
Before opening the Dragonmead Larry Channel and Bill Wrobel worked for Chrysler while Earl Scherbarth worked at Ford. Their first interest in brewing came from a home brew kit bought for Scherbarth's birthday. They decided to try different methods and ingredients to create new beers. During this period the group of friends looked into starting a business in the areas of computers or printing. Wrobel proposed that they start a brewery after they became familiar with the process of brewing. A year later the partners opened Dragonmead in May 1998. The company still sells to the home-brew community.

In 1998, the Bay City Times wrote:

"Word about Dragonmead's magic is spreading, though they only make 18 barrels weekly and won't reach full capacity at their hospital-clean 5,200-square-foot [480 m^{2}] factory until spring 1999. Detroit celebrity chef Jimmy Schmidt (Note: Schmidt is a three-time James Beard Award-winner.) stocks Dragonmead at various high-end restaurants." (Note: "...his Kercheval on the Hill in Grosse Pointe, as do such swank joints as the Grosse Pointe Yacht Club, the Pointe Bar-B-Q in Detroit, and Ashley's in Ann Arbor.”)

Johnny Klein, owner of Steamers Pub, on Bay City's West Side, and Steamers Pub South, in Saginaw, praised the brewery and its product. (Note: ""Beer," he remarked, "is a lot like sex. It's all good, but some is better than others." “Microbrewers in Michigan are making some of the finest beers available on the market today, but these guys are taking it a step further. Dragonmead is making beers that your average microbrewery is not making." A key difference between Dragonmead and other Michigan microbreweries is the creation process. Most use "generational" yeast - the same batch of yeast is used and re-used as a blend for several varieties of lagers, ales and wheat beers." Not Dragonmead. Owners Larry Channell, Earl Scherbarth and Bill Wrobel only use original yeast batches once for each specific style of beverage. "They take no shortcuts at all. For anybody who knows anything about making beer, that's incredibly painstaking," Klein said. "That's taking the extra step to ensure quality.")

In 2015, the brewery surpassed its "nanobrewery" (Note: Nanobrewery—a brewery that produces beer in four barrels or less. With their custom 3 barrel HDP brewing system "... they were a nano brewery before anyone used the term nano to describe a brewery.” Start up breweries typically have a 15 barrel system.) character, upgrading to an 11,000 square foot facility, with a 1,000 square foot taproom, and re-purposing old equipment. (Note: Thus, "its nanobrewery status (a brewery that produces beer in four barrels or fewer) is about to become a thing of the past.") It used a three-barrel system to produce 2,500 barrels per year. The brewery purchased and installed a computer-automated Braumat software driven unit. (Note: "The new system, purchased from Lake Orion-based Craftwerk Brewing Systems [permits] brewers [to] control every step of the brewing process. All of the tanks are shown on a computer monitor, and the brewer can simply click on each tank to check or adjust a number of factors, such as fermentation and temperature. Dragonmead is one of only a handful of smaller breweries in Michigan to adopt the system.") According to Channell, the increased capacity will enable the pub to increase the number of "taps from 52 to 103 or more, and have at least one of each Beer Judge Certification Program-accepted style and sub-style available". The brewers intend to extend their distribution. (Note: To reach to higher volume distributors in Livingston, Washtenaw and Wayne counties, and in due course throughout Michigan and other states. "We see a demand there for a lot more than what we're doing (now).") More seasonal brews are expected with the expansion.

== Beers ==
Dragonmead uses at least 57 types of grain for brewing, and sometimes as many as 75 from seven countries in a year. Yeast strains – the company stocks fifteen – are used only once for brewing. The brewery's most popular product is named Final Absolution Trippel, a bottled ale. in December 2014 the brewing system was expanded to allow the production of an increased range of beers.

This brewery has formulated beer recipes for 26 varieties. These include multiple formulations of American style ales, English ales, German-style ales, a German lager, Belgian ales, Scottish ales, and a Russian Imperial Stout. Other regionally distributed beers include "Under the Kilt Wee Heavy" (7.8% ABV Scottish style strong ale), and Sin Eater {11% ABV Belgian strong dark ale}. The "Big 5" are their most popular beers, available as four-bottle packs in stores (Note: Crown Jewels IPA, Under the Kilt Wee Heavy, Final Absolution Trippel, Erik the Red and Sir William's Extra Special Bitter. Another source calls them "flagship beers".) On tap the pub features a wide range of beers, including seasonal varieties. The scope of the brewery's distribution has widened.

A part of their effort is to brew to type, they use proper geographically relevant ingredients. (Note: "Offering nearly 50 beers on tap, all of which are made on-site using regionally specific ingredients, patrons can take a geographical journey by enjoying brews inspired by Old World recipes in a setting that hark back to a time when members of the feudal system would tip back tankards and complain about serfdom." Crusader Dark Mild Ale, Erik the Red, Final Absolution, Russian Imperial Stout are said to be "key beers".) (Note: "The gold medal was for Final Absolution, a Belgian style trippel that beat out many other beers from Belgium. Not only did they trounce the Belgian beers, the judges were from Belgium! This victory was even sweeter as these same Belgian judges had, just the day before, stated that Americans could never brew Belgian style beers as well as a native Belgian due to inferior ingredients; a great story and a great triumph for Dragonmead and American craft brewers. To me, the story was the beer equivalent of the 1976 wine competition “Judgment of Paris” when Napa Valley wines defeated the wines of Bordeaux in a blind tasting that was judged by the Parisians!" An example of the use of properly-sourced ingredients is the Camelot Bronze Belgian Ale, which mixes "sweet orange blossom honey" with imported Munich malt together with Belgian malted two-row barley. "The only thing not from Belgium in that beer is the Warren water, and our water is pretty good," Dragonmead owner Larry Channell wisecracked.)

== Facilities ==
As the Chicago Tribune noted and photographed, the bar features a plethora of unconventional beer tap handles, i.e., just a portion of the 75 handles were photographed, "plus the stained-glass windows in the mirror's reflection. Belgian abbey, medieval watering hole, or Dungeon's & Dragons haunt: you decide." Other crafted tap handles include Erik the Red, Coppershield Bitter Harvest, Excalibur Barley Wine and Russian Imperial Stout, all of which have their own escutcheon. The decor includes two large vitreous glass tile mosaics, "Shield" by William Wrobel. He also crafted two large leaded art glass windows—The Knight's Window and The Dragon's Window. The bar itself was 6 years in the making by Dragonmead owner D. Earl Scherbarth, and includes a "copper-top back bar with custom oak cabinetry.

== Awards ==
The brewery won a 2006 Gold Medal in the World Beer Cup – popularly and unofficially called "The Olympics of Beer" (Note: "'It's called 'The Olympics of Beer Competition' for good reason,' said Charlie Papazian, president of the Brewers Association, the U.S.-based trade association that has put on the competition every two years since 1996. 'The event brings together great brewers from all corners of the globe. Plus, the awards are highly regarded. A brewer who wins a World Beer Cup gold award knows that their winning beer represents the best of that beer style in the world. Congratulations to all the winners of the 2012 World Beer Cup. The Brewers Association and the proud sponsors of our event thank all participating brewers for their involvement.'") – for their Belgian Triple Final Absolution, at 10% ABV with a rating of 94 at RateBeer. That beer is memorialized in a beer tap handle. Another World Cup gold medalist was an English-style bitter, "Crusader Dark Mild Ale". In 2012, Dragonmead double-medaled at the World Beer Cup. (Note: In Category 6: Herb and Spice Beer, 80 Entries Silver: Ring Of Fire, Dragonmead Microbrewery; in Category 11: Specialty Honey Beer, 23 Entries Bronze: Killer Bee, Dragonmead Microbrewery.)

Through end of 2014, the brewery has been awarded five prestigious World Beer Cup medals, and five medals from the International Mazer Cup Mead Competition. Combined with "numerous local and national awards, Dragonmead Microbrewery is one of the most-awarded breweries in the United States."

It was named by RateBeer to its list of "Top 50 Breweries to Visit in the World". (Note: "Warren's Dragonmead is one of the superior microbreweries. ... Dragonmead is a genuine craft beer mecca." It "is consistently ranked in the top breweries in the world on beer rating websites BeerAdvocate.com and RateBeer.com." It was voted best craft brewery in Macomb County in 2012 and 2013. Voted Best Brewery 2012 by Metromix.com and Best Microbrewery in Detroit for 2012 by Hour Detroit Magazine.)

== Other products ==
The brewery also produces mead. In 2014, the brewery garnered five awards at the Mazer Cup International Mead Competition. 1st place ESB, Braggot; 2nd place Crooked Door Braggot; 2nd place Strawberry Mead Dessert; 3rd place Medieval Spice Pumpkin Dessert; 1st place Cherry Mead Mellomel Dry. (Note: Held in Boulder, Colorado, it is the largest mead event in the world.)

The brewer also produces and serves its own root beer and sodas.

The brewpub now operates a kitchen with a specialized menu designed to be in accord with the beer. (Note: The kitchen is being run as a joint venture with Lazybones Smokehouse, whose chef-owner Deni Smiljanovski (previously of The Golden Mushroom in Southfield, Michigan) is in charge. It serves a medley of pub grub. Lazybones formerly would deliver food ad hoc to individual customers who were at Dragonmead. The pub had minimal food service, and thus allowed deliveries. Chef Smiljanovski created "Dragonbones - an original selection of beer-friendly appetizers and big sausage sandwiches prepared on site".) Growler beer bottles are filled and beer flights are served.

== Related joint venture and trade organizations ==
Dragonmead entered into a joint venture with another Warren, Michigan microbrewery, Kuhnhenn Brewing Company. The agreement entailed production of "Dark Heathen", an "extremely high gravity Doopelbock-hybrid style of beer". This 12.5% ABV beverage would take 6 months of lagering before being packaged.

Dragonmead is a member of the Michigan Brewers Guild and the national Brewer's Association. Their individual brewers are members of the Master Brewers’ Association of the Americas Detroit chapter.

It also supports "Fermenta," a specialized trade group founded by women in Michigan (at a meeting April 2014 at the Arbor Brewing Company) that is "committed to diversity, camaraderie, networking, [networking] and education within the craft beverage industry." It is one of 11 Michigan craft breweries participating along with the Michigan Brewers Guild.

== See also ==
- List of microbreweries
