= Marlow Bottom =

Village in Buckinghamshire, England

Coordinates: 51.5901°N 0.7816°W

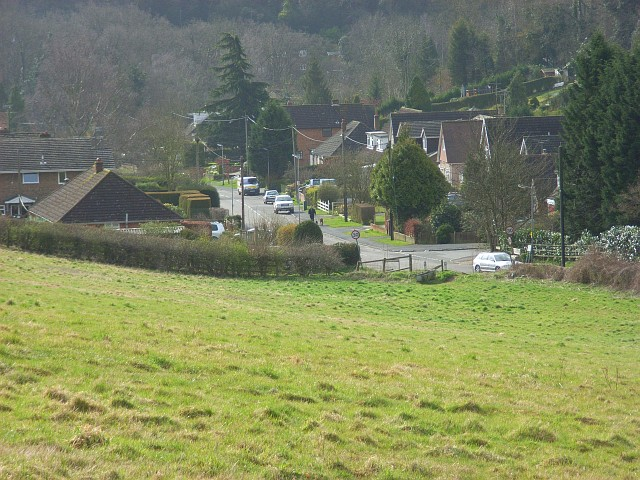
- Marlow Bottom

- Location within Buckinghamshire
- Population: 3,295; 3,438 (2011 Census)
- OS grid reference: SU845885
- Civil parish: Marlow Bottom
- Unitary authority: Buckinghamshire
- Ceremonial county: Buckinghamshire
- Region: South East
- Country: England
- Sovereign state: United Kingdom
- Post town: MARLOW
- Postcode district: SL7
- Dialling code: 01628
- Police: Thames Valley
- Fire: Buckinghamshire
- Ambulance: South Central
- UK Parliament: Wycombe

Marlow Bottom is a linear village occupying a valley to the north of Marlow, Buckinghamshire. It is also a civil parish in the Buckinghamshire district having been created in November 2007. Formerly it was part of the parish of Great Marlow.

Marlow Bottom is 25 to 30 minutes walk from the centre of Marlow town, and the river Thames. It has shops, including a vet, chemist, dentist, podiatrist, coffee shop, 2 barbers, hair salon, dog grooming parlour, Italian restaurant and fish & chip shop, a large primary school, (Burford School), a private members club (The Barn Club, for valley residents), a village hall and a church which is part of a Local Ecumenical Partnership "The Lantern", where the local Boy Scout and Girl Guide groups and similar voluntary groups meet.

== Education ==
The primary school in Marlow Bottom is Burford County Combined School. It provides schooling for children aged 4–11, who will go on to either a local grammar school or secondary modern school depending on their results in the eleven-plus exam.

== Points of interest ==
- Olympic champion rower Steve Redgrave lives in the village, having been born locally and attended local schools.
- The award-winning Rebellion Beer Company has brewed ales in the village since 1993.
- The annual Rock Bottom Music Festival is held every year in the playing fields which started in 2013.
