= Rebellion Beer Company =

- Logo, featuring Marlow Bridge
- Interactive map of Rebellion Beer Company
- Type: Microbrewery
- Location: Marlow Bottom, Buckinghamshire, England
- Coordinates: 51.5862°N 0.7681°W
- Opened: 1993
- Annual production volume: 125 barrels per week
- Website: rebellionbeer.co.uk

Active beers
Name	Type
IPA	IPA
Overthrow	Pale ale
Roasted Nuts	Ale
Smuggler	Amber ale
Blonde	Blonde
Red	Ale
24 Carat	Pale ale
Lager	Lager

Seasonal beers
Name	Type
Winter Royal	Amber ale
Monthly	Various

Other beers
Name	Type
Development Brew	Various

The Rebellion Beer Company is an independent, employee-owned brewery based at Bencombe Farm in Marlow Bottom, Buckinghamshire, England. Founded in 1993 by Tim Coombes and Mark Gloyens, the brewery produces traditional cask ales, lagers, stouts and contemporary craft beers.

The brewery supplies pubs and other trade customers across the surrounding region and operates an on-site shop, drive-through and Tap Yard. The Tap Yard is accompanied by the Rebellion Kitchen, which serves freshly prepared food, including wood-fired pizzas and Sunday specials. The brewery also runs tours, events and a membership club.

In October 2026, the company's founders transferred ownership of the business to an Employee Ownership Trust (EOT), with the stated aim of preserving its independence and maintaining brewing operations in Marlow Bottom.

== History ==
Founding and early years (1993–2000)

The Rebellion Beer Company was founded in 1993 by Tim Coombes and Mark Gloyens, former pupils of Sir William Borlase's Grammar School in Marlow. The brewery was established following the closure of Wethered's Brewery in 1987, which had operated in Marlow for more than two centuries.

Rebellion initially operated from a small industrial unit in Marlow Bottom. In 1998, the company acquired Courage's former Pilot Brewery, before relocating to Bencombe Farm in 1999, where former agricultural buildings were converted for brewing operations.

Expansion and development (2001–2020)

In 2003, Rebellion acquired the lease of the Three Horseshoes pub in Marlow, which it operated until 2006.

The brewery expanded its production facilities during the 2010s, installing additional fermentation tanks, upgrading its packaging equipment and increasing brewing capacity. A larger brewery shop opened in 2017, followed by the installation of an in-house bottling line in 2019.

During the COVID-19 pandemic in 2020, the brewery introduced a home delivery service and an on-site drive-through to continue selling beer directly to customers while pubs were closed.

Tap Yard and further development (2021–2025)

In July 2021, Rebellion opened the Tap Yard, an on-site bar serving its beers directly to visitors. The brewery also installed a smaller development brewing system to produce experimental and limited-edition beers.

In 2023, the brewery began using water extracted from a borehole at Bencombe Farm, drawing on groundwater from the Chiltern Hills. By 2025, borehole water was being used for all beer production.

The brewery expanded its range during this period to include additional craft beers, stouts and barrel-aged beers, alongside its traditional cask ales and lager.

Employee ownership (2026–present)

In October 2026, founders Tim Coombes and Mark Gloyens transferred ownership of the Rebellion Beer Company to an Employee Ownership Trust (EOT), following 33 years of independent ownership.

The transfer was intended to preserve the brewery's independence, maintain its operations at Bencombe Farm and provide continuity for its employees and customers. At the time of the transition, the company employed approximately 75 people.

Coombes and Gloyens announced that they would remain involved with the business for several years while a management team consisting of long-serving employees gradually assumed responsibility for its operations.

The company also announced plans for a community crowdfunding initiative in spring 2027 to support its future development.

== Beer varieties ==
Rebellion's beer range combines traditional British brewing styles with contemporary offerings. Its core cask ales include IPA, Smuggler, Overthrow and Roasted Nuts, complemented by Rebellion Lager, Eclipse nitrogenated stout and a separate selection of bottled beers. These are distributed to pubs and other trade customers, with bottled products also available through selected supermarkets.

Alongside its permanent range, the brewery produces monthly seasonal cask ales exploring different styles and hop varieties, as well as small-batch releases and beers brewed for special occasions, including sporting events and Christmas. Its bottled range also includes stronger and barrel-aged Belgian-style ales.

Customers can purchase Rebellion beers directly from the brewery's shop, drive-through, Tap Yard and online shop. Local home delivery and wider courier services are also available.

== Brewery Operations ==
Rebellion operates from Bencombe Farm in Marlow Bottom, Buckinghamshire, where its brewing, bottling, distribution and Tap Yard bar are located. The brewery produces traditional cask ales alongside lagers, stouts, seasonal beers and limited-edition releases.

The brewery uses water drawn from its own borehole, which accesses groundwater from the chalk geology of the Chiltern Hills. The naturally occurring minerals in the water contribute to its brewing characteristics.

Over the years, Rebellion has expanded its production facilities, including the installation of additional fermentation vessels, an in-house bottling line and a smaller brewing system used for small-batch releases.

== Tap Yard and Rebellion Kitchen ==
The Rebellion Tap Yard opened in July 2021, providing an on-site venue where visitors can drink beers produced at the brewery. The Tap Yard hosts a programme of events, including live music, comedy performances, quizzes and community gatherings.

The venue also incorporates the Rebellion Kitchen, which serves freshly prepared food, including wood-fired pizzas, Sunday breakfast dishes and Yorkshire pudding wraps. Visiting street food traders provide additional food options on selected days.

The brewery operates an on-site shop and drive-through, selling fresh and bottled beers alongside other drinks and merchandise. Guided brewery tours are also available, offering visitors an introduction to the brewing process and the company's history.

== Awards and Community Involvement ==
Rebellion has received recognition for its beers in regional and national brewing competitions, including awards for its traditional ales and more contemporary beer styles.

The brewery has longstanding connections with the local community, supporting charitable organisations and fundraising initiatives in Buckinghamshire and the surrounding area. Over its history, Rebellion has helped raise more than £300,000 for charitable causes.

Rebellion also operates a brewery membership scheme, providing members with benefits on purchases and access to brewery-related activities.

== Awards ==
The Rebellion Beer Company has won numerous awards from the Society of Independent Brewers at both a local and national level. Its Rebellion White won the supreme champion award in the wheat beer challenge of the Society of Independent Brewers in 2003.

Award nominations for Beer Products
Year	Award	Category	Nominee(s)	Result	Ref.
2018	SIBA Midlands Independent Beer Awards	Bottle/Can British Premium Bitter (4.5% to 6.4%)	Red	Bronze	
2019	SIBA Midlands Independent Beer Awards	Bottle/Can Premium PAs (4.4 to 5.4%)	24 Carat	Gold	
2019	SIBA Midlands Independent Beer Awards	Bottle/Can Session Lager & Pilsners	Lager	Gold	
2019	SIBA Midlands Independent Beer Awards	Bottle/Can Speciality Light Beers	White	Gold	
2019	SIBA National Independent Beer Awards	Keg Session Lager & Pilsners	Lager	Bronze	
2019	World Beer Awards	UK Lager	Lager	Silver	
2019	World Beer Awards	UK Stout & Porter	Black	Gold	
2019	International Beer Challenge	Lagers	Lager	Bronze	
2020	SIBA National Independent Beer Awards	Bottle/Can Session Lager & Pilsners	Rebellion Lager	Gold	
2021	SIBA Midlands Independent Beer Awards	Cask British Bitters (up to 4.4%)	Overthrow	Gold	
2021	SIBA Midlands Bottle & Can Beer Awards	British Dark Beers (4.5 to 6.4%)	Roasted Nuts Extra	Silver	
2022	SIBA Midlands Independent Beer Awards	Keg Lager	Rebellion Lager	Gold	
2022	SIBA Midlands Independent Beer Awards	Cask British Bitter	Overthrow	Silver	
2022	SIBA Midlands Independent Beer Awards	Keg Pale Ale	24 Carat	Bronze	
2022	SIBA Midlands Independent Beer Awards	Keg Stout & Porter	Black	Bronze	
2022	SIBA National Independent Beer Awards	Cask British Bitters (up to 4.4%)	Overthrow	Bronze	
2022	SIBA National Independent Beer Awards	Bottle/Can Session Lager & Pilsners	Rebellion Lager	Bronze	
2022	SIBA National Independent Beer Awards	Keg British Dark Beers (4.5 to 6.4%)	Black	Silver	

== See also ==
- Brewery
- List of microbreweries
