= Tired Hands Brewing Company =

- Industry: Alcoholic beverages
- Founded: 2011
- Founder: Jean Broillet IV
- Headquarters: Ardmore, Pennsylvania, United States
- Number of locations: 3
- Products: Beer
- Owner: Jean Broillet IV
- Website: tiredhands.com

Tired Hands Brewing Company is a brew-café founded in 2011 in Ardmore, Pennsylvania by Jean Broillet IV. The current location at 16 Ardmore Ave produces 1,000 barrels per year and its capacity is 150 chairs/seats.

Tired Hands produces their beer in smaller batches and specializes in Western European farmhouse ales as well as American hoppy ales. The food menu includes bread baked onsite, local cheeses, meats, pickled items, and seasonal produce. A second brewpub called the "Fermentaria" was opened later in April 2015, at 35 Cricket Terrace. Tired Hands opened another establishment in the city of Philadelphia, St. Oners, at 2218 Frankford Avenue.

== Awards ==
2016 Semi-Finalist - Outstanding Bar Program

Philadelphia Inquirer Brew-vitational

2014 Winner - Best Saison - Tired Hands HandFarm
2014 Winner - Best Stout - Tired Hands Grateful Monkey Death Trip!
2013 Runner-up - Best New Beer

Philly Beer Scene Magazine:
2013 Winner - Brewpub of the Year
2013 Nominee - Brewmaster of the Year - Jean Broillet IV

RateBeer.com
2014 Winner - Top 100 Brewers in the World
2014 Winner - Top Brewer - Pennsylvania
2014 Winner - Top Beer - Pennsylvania - Tired Hands The Emptiness is Eternal
2013 Winner - Top 100 Brewers in the World
2013 Winner - Top 100 Beers in the World - Tired Hands HandFarm
2013 Winner - Top Brewer - Pennsylvania
2013 Winner - Best Brewpub - Pennsylvania
2013 Winner - Top Beer - Pennsylvania - Tired Hands HandFarm
2013 Winner - Best New Brewer Pennsylvania
2013 Winner - The World's Top 50 New Beer Releases - Tired Hands HandFarm
2013 Winner - The World's Top 50 New Beer Releases - Tired Hands MagoTago
2013 Winner - The World's Top 50 New Beer Releases - Tired Hands The Light That Spills Out Of The Hole In Your Head
2013 Winner - The World's Top 50 New Beer Releases - Tired Hands We Are All Infinite Energy Vibrating at the Same Frequency
2013 Gold - Best Belgian Session - Tired Hands HandFarm
2013 Silver - Best American Amber/ Pale - Tired Hands The Light That Spills Out Of The Hole In Your Head
2013 Silver - Best Pale Lager - Tired Hands Pizza Boy California Uber Helles
2013 Silver - Best American Amber/ Pale - Tired Hands HopHands
2013 Bronze - Best English Style Pale & Bitter - Tired Hands Caskette
2012 Winner - Top 50 New Beers - Tired Hands HopHands
2012 Winner - Top 50 New Beers - Tired Hands Hill Farmstead Delicado
2012 Winner - Top 50 New Beers - Tired Hands The Light That Spills Out Of The Hole In Your Head
2012 Winner - Top 50 New Beers - Tired Hands Buddy's Breakfast Buddy Brunch

== See also ==
- List of microbreweries
