= Fóti Craft Brewery =

Fóti Craft Brewery (Hungarian: Fóti Kézműves Sörfőzde) is a brewery in Fót, Hungary. The brewery began in 1994, mostly making simple classic beer, but in the early 2010s, the brewery began to make specialty beers not generally available from domestic brewers in Hungary.

The brewery has a daily capacity of 1,200 liters. It produces 4-5 beers at any one time, some of them only available seasonally.

The continuously made beer include a pilsner; a bitter honey lager (Keserű Méz); unpasteurized Zwickelbier (Foti Zwickl); and a strong (8%) semi-brown hopped lager (Hammurabi +21).

Seasonable beers have included a spiced winter version of the bitter honey lager, and an orange-honey ginger beer.

The beers are sold in flip-top bottles.
