= Dugges Ale och Porterbryggeri =

Brewery in Landvetter, Sweden

Coordinates: 57°38′38.98″N 12°1′42.39″E

Dugges Ale- & Porterbryggeri
- Industry: Alcoholic beverage
- Founded: 2005
- Headquarters: Mölndal; Sweden
- Products: Beer
- Owner: Mikael Dugge Engström
- Website: http://www.dugges.se/

Dugges Ale- & Porterbryggeri (Dugge's Ale & Porter Brewery) is a brewery in Landvetter outside Gothenburg, Sweden. The brewery was started in 2005 by Mikael Dugge Engström and is focused on top-fermented beers, influenced by US microbreweries. The ales are brewed with many hops, such as Chinook, giving them a strong and pleasant aroma. The brewery is very active in inventing new types of beer and usually has many test batches for sale.

The brewery has won several medals in competitions. For instance gold medal at the Stockholm Beer & Whiskey Festival.

In 2007 the brewery purchased a bottling machine in addition to previously sold barrels. The beer is sold at several bars and restaurants in Sweden as well as at Systembolaget. In 2012 the brewery expanded through the purchase of new brewery equipment and moving into new larger premises.
