= White Marsh Brewing Company =

- Company type: Restaurant
- Industry: casual dining restaurant
- Founded: 1997
- Headquarters: White Marsh, MD
- Website: www.redbrickstation.com

White Marsh Brewing Company, LLC is a brewery founded in 1996 by founders Bill Blocher and Tony Meoli. The company is a member of the Brewers Association of Maryland.

== Distribution ==
White Marsh Brewing Company owns and operates Red Brick Station, a restaurant located on The Avenue in White Marsh, Maryland, which is the primary outlet for its beers. All beer sold at Red Brick Station is brewed by the parent company.

The company lost its primary distributor in early 2008, when Old Dominion was sold to Coastal Brewing.

== The beers ==
The following beers are served year round:

- Avenue Ale / Ale
- Honeygo Lite / Lite Ale
- Daily Crisis IPA / India Pale Ale
- Something Red / Amber Ale
- Spooners Stout / Stout

White Marsh Brewing Company also offers seasonal bears at their Red Brick Station location that vary throughout the year. These include:

- Big Gunpowder Pale Ale
- Highlander Heavy
- Blueberry Ale
