= Rohrbach Brewing Company =

Brewery in Rochester, New York

Rohrbach Brewing Co.

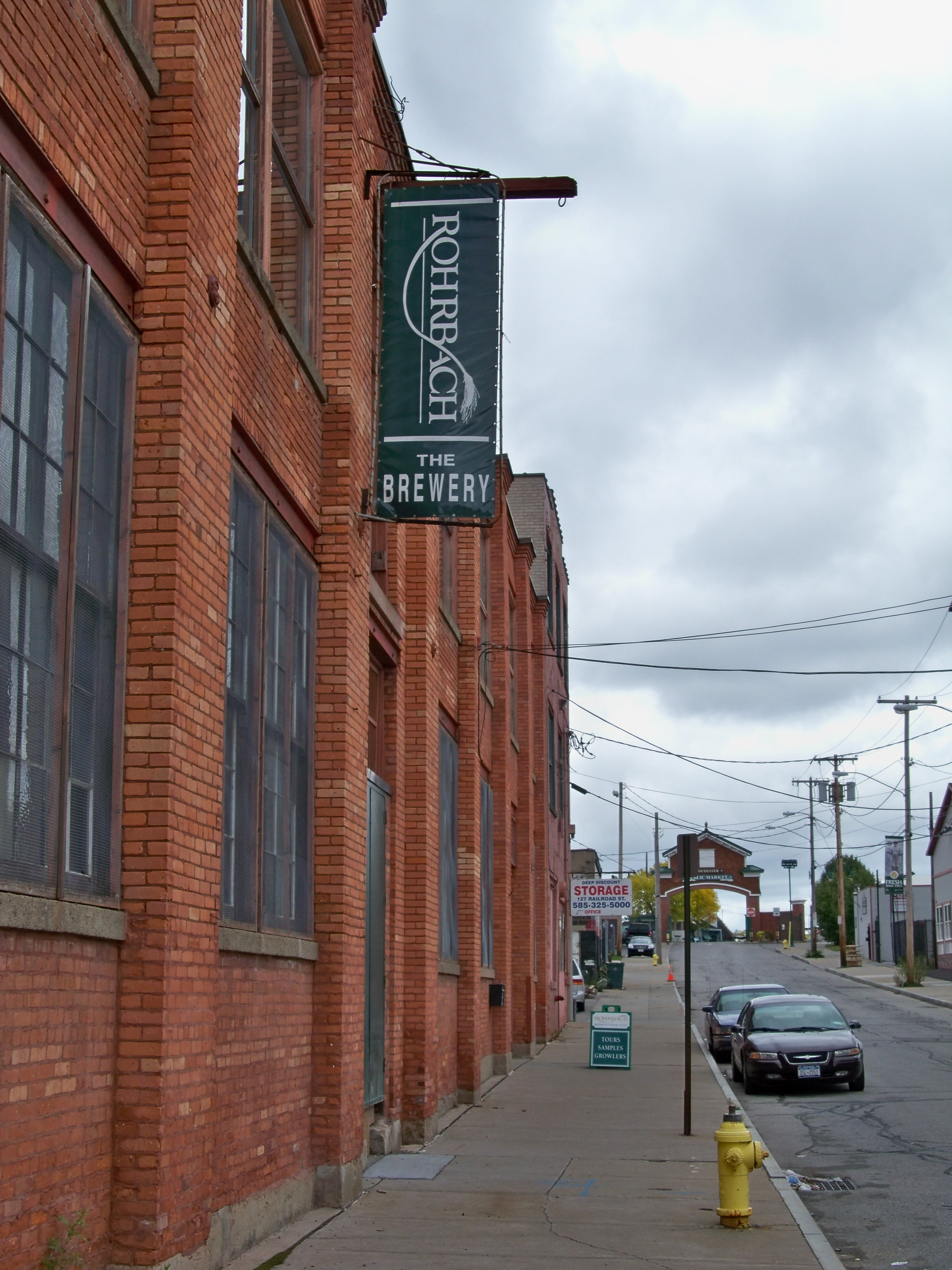
- Type: Private
- Industry: Restaurant, Microbrew
- Founded: 1991
- Headquarters: Rochester, NY, United States
- Website: www.rohrbachs.com

Rohrbach Brewing Company (Rohrbach's) is a craft brewery in Rochester, New York, USA. Founded in 1991 by John and Patty Urlaub, Rohrbach Brewing Co. is Rochester's first craft brewery. The brewing company takes its name from Rohrbach, Germany, a small town that inspired its founder to bring craft beer to Rochester. The company first originated in the German House on Gregory Street, then grew into the two locations existing today–the production brewery on Railroad St. and Buffalo Rd. brewpub. Though the company has grown over the past 25 years, Rohrbachs has stayed true to its roots. You can only find Rohrbach beer in Rochester, Buffalo, Syracuse, and their surrounding Upstate NY areas.

The company has brewing facilities at 97 Railroad Street in the Public Market district of Rochester. The company also has a restaurant in the Rochester suburb of Ogden, New York.

Rohrbach Brewing Company is the host of the annual Flour City Brewing Festival.

== Locations ==
Rohrbach Brewing Co. has grown to two current locations.

Beer Hall & Brewery: The production brewery and beer hall is located at 97 Railroad Street in the Rochester Public Market District. The beer hall serves up draft beer, wine, and cider along with a wood-fired menu. All distribution is handled out of this location. Tours of the facilities are available on Saturdays. The Rochester Public Market District has seen recent growth, with extensive public market renovations and new businesses including Boxcar Donuts, Bitter Honey, Warehouse 127, Fiorella's, and more. Black Button Distilling also neighbors Rohrbachs in the same factory building.

Brewpub: The Rohrbach Buffalo Rd. Brewpub is located at 3859 Buffalo Road in Ogden, New York. The brewpub serves a variety of German and American pub fare and selection of Rohrbach-brewed ales & lagers. A small production facility is used at the brewpub to brew small-batch ales and lagers.

== Beers ==
Rohrbach Brewing Co. has a line of classic brews available in 4-pack 16oz cans all year round. Their flagship beer is the Rohrbach Scotch Ale, with other year-round beers including Blueberry Ale, Railroad Street IPA, Vanilla Porter, Highland Lager, and Space Kitty Double IPA. These beers are available in many stores throughout Upstate New York, including all Wegmans stores.

Rohrbachs also brews many seasonals and contract brews. Rohrbachs has been brewing the Red Wing Red Ale for the Rochester Red Wings, the class AAA Washington Nationals affiliate team, for about 20 years. Rohrbach beers have long been served at the team's stadium, Frontier Field.

Small-batches and limited-releases are brewed year round for short availability. Many of these small-batches are brewed at the smaller brewpub location.
