= Tree House Brewing Company =

Brewery in Massachusetts

Coordinates: 42.136623°N 72.012347°W

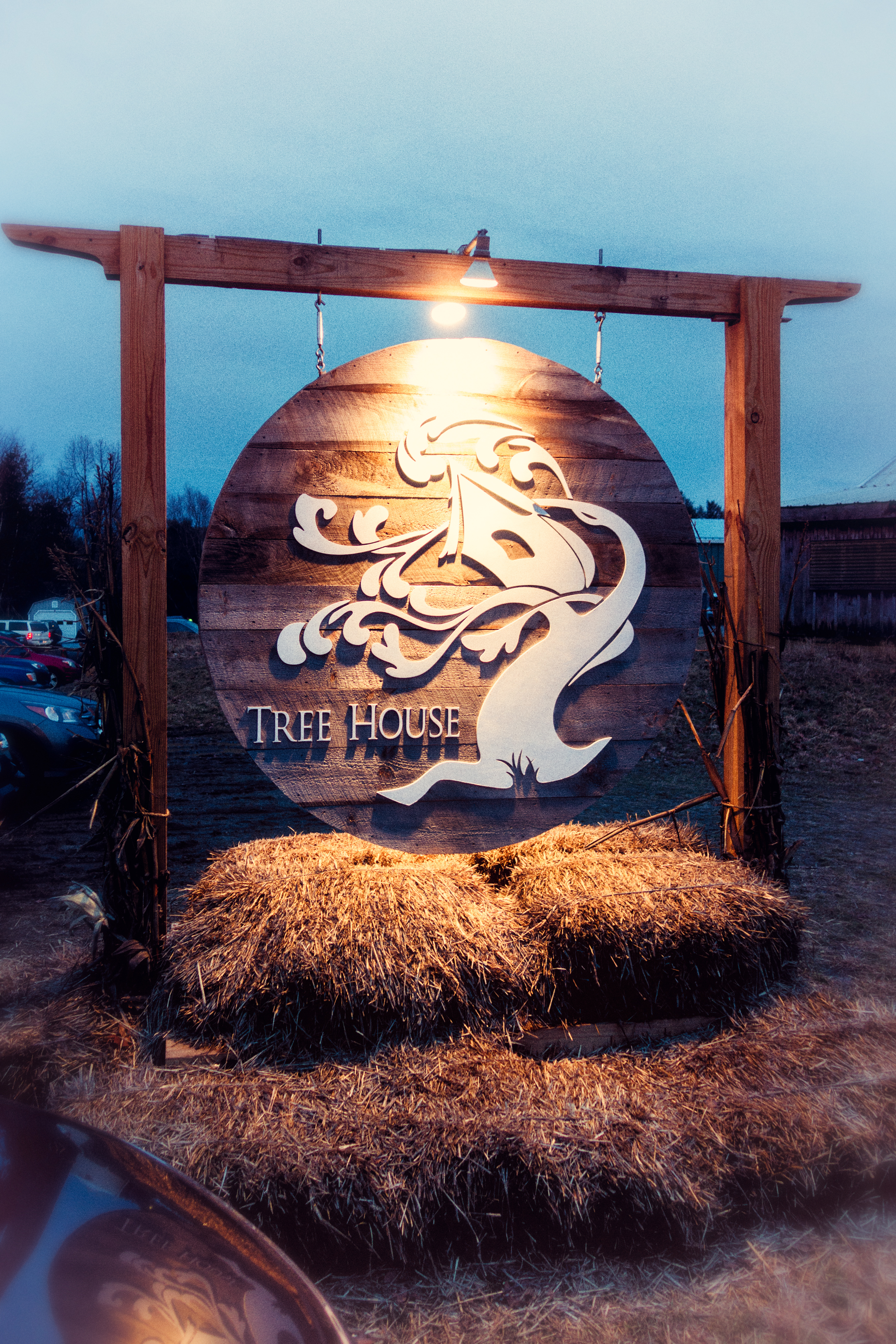
- Interactive map of Tree House Brewing Company
- Location: Charlton, Massachusetts, United States
- Website: treehousebrew.com

Tree House Brewing Company is a brewery located in Charlton, Massachusetts, approximately sixty miles (97 km) west of Boston. It is ranked among the best breweries in the United States, including public beer-rating sites like Untappd (ranked 8th best brewery in the country) and Beer Advocate (brew 3 out of the top 10 beers in the country), as well as Forbes, the Boston Globe, and Thrillist. Founded in 2011, the brewery was originally located in Brimfield, Massachusetts, then moved on to Monson, Massachusetts in 2013, before a multimillion-dollar project led to the current site in 2017.

== Founding and early years in Monson ==
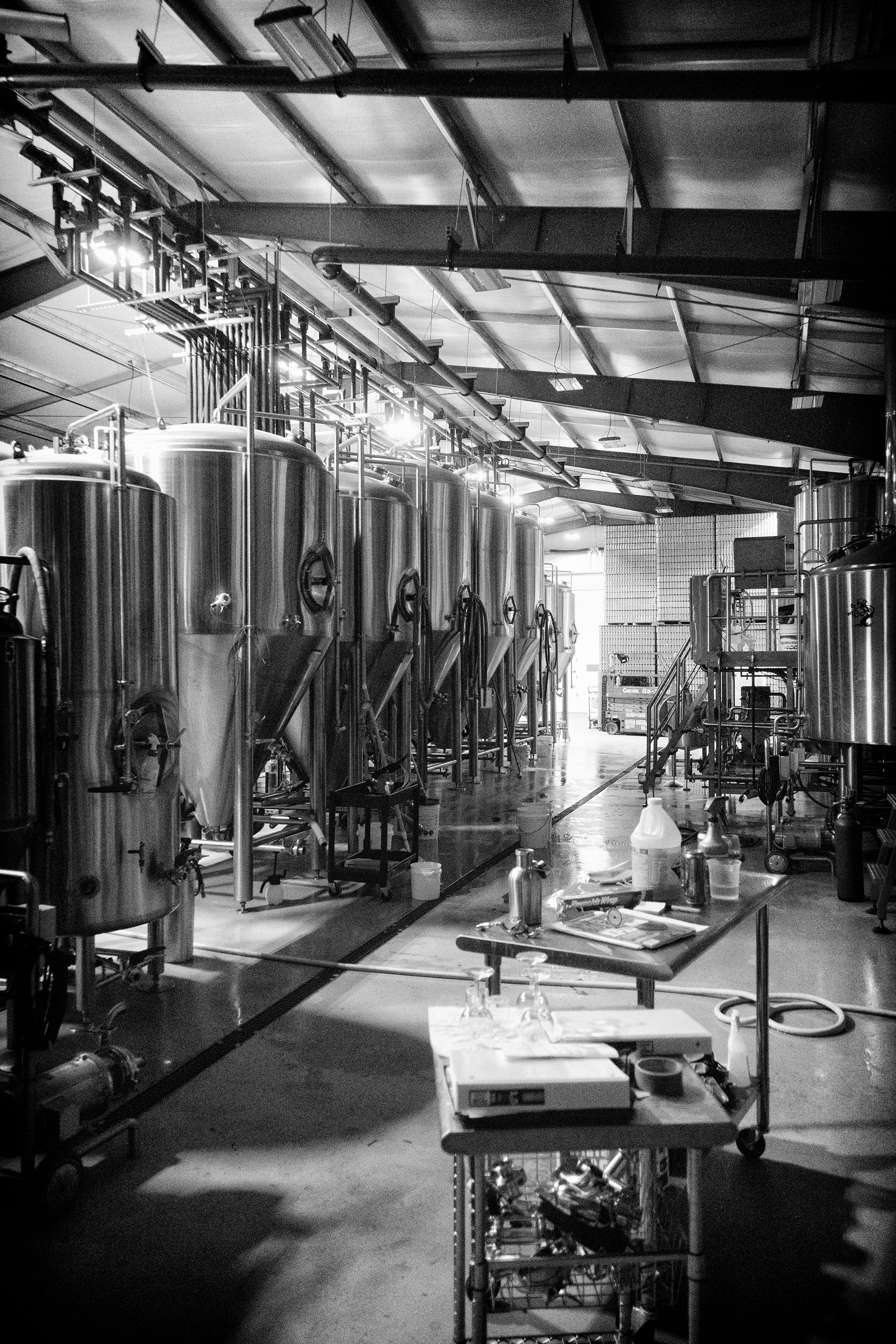
Tree House Brewing Company interior, 2016

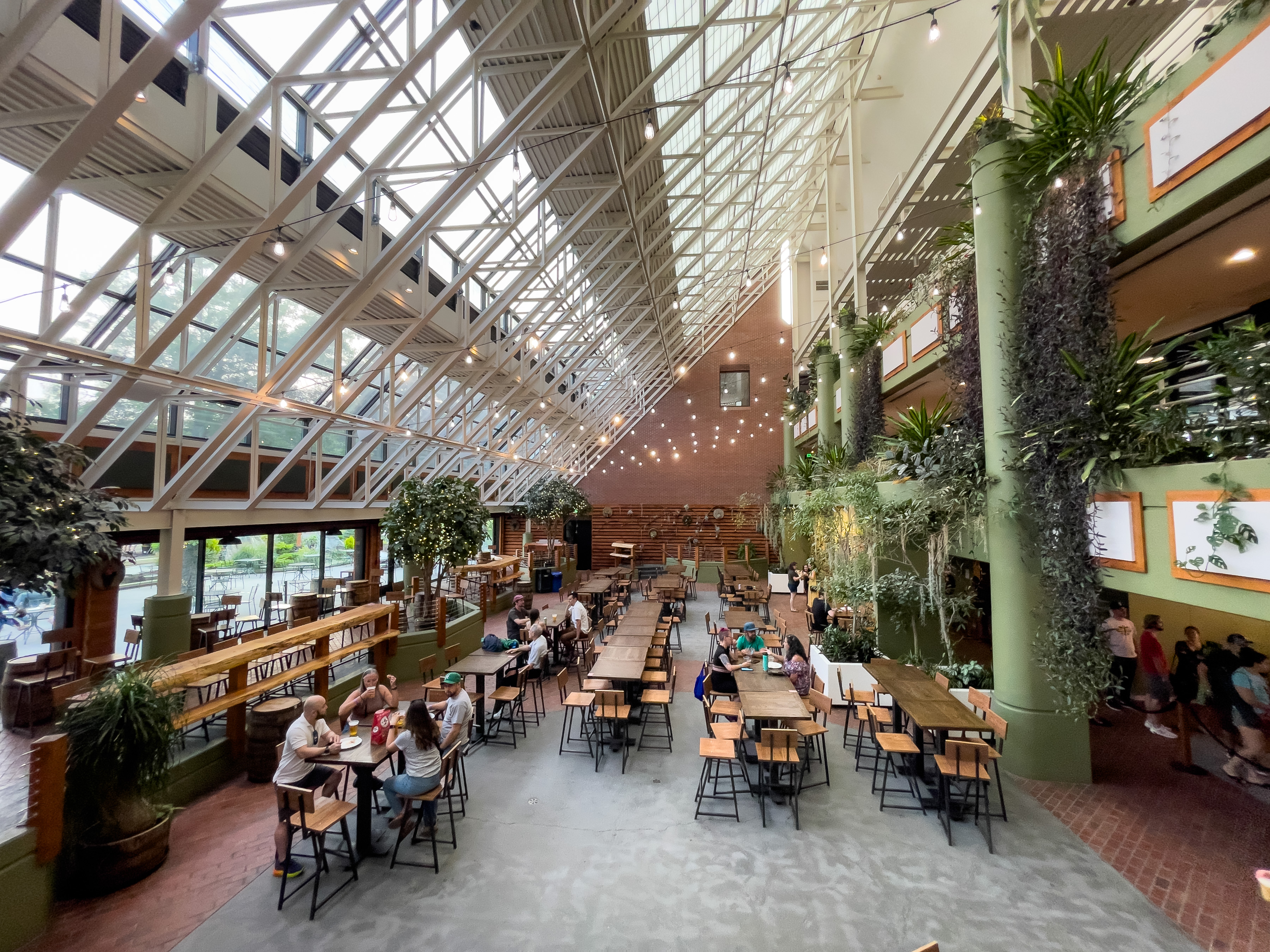
Deerfield Tap Room, 2024

Tree House Brewing Co. was founded in Brimfield, Massachusetts, in 2011 by Dean Rohan, Nate Lanier, Damien Goudreau, and Jonathan Weisbach. The four founders had begun as homebrewers, making beer in Lanier's kitchen starting around 2008. Their initial commercial site was a small 2.7-acre (1.1 ha) farm, on the edge of which sat the tree house which inspired the brewery's name. The brewery's time in Brimfield proved productive, despite legal challenges from at least one citizen in Brimfield, as customers would come to visit, have their growlers filled, and return, passing along rave reviews on the way.

In 2013, after the zoning dispute came to a head, Tree House moved to their site in Monson to Koran Farm, owned by the family of one of the founders. The brewery was operated in a somewhat cramped space in the farm's stand, with a retail store in a shed. In 2014, an expansion was planned in Monson, which expanded the breweries capacity six-fold, from an operation capable of producing about 150 US gallons (570 L; 120 imp gal) of beer at a time, to one capable of producing about 900 US gallons (3,400 L; 750 imp gal) of beer at a time, including a tap room which was able to pour draughts on site on occasion. During this time, Tree House claimed to be one of the only off-the-grid breweries in New England: "The beer is made with well water that is pumped right out of the ground on the property, and he said it is a key ingredient in the final product."

== Move to Charlton ==
Following a public hearing in 2016, Tree House was approved to purchase land in Charlton, Massachusetts, for the construction of their new 53,000-square-foot (4,900 m^{2}) brewery. According to the public hearing notice, the entire project cost approximately $18.5 million, $7.7 million of which was issued as a bond by Mass Development. The new site in Charlton doubled the brewing capacity of the company.

The Charlton site opened in May 2017. Despite continuing to sell beers on-site only, the brewery regularly sells out its supply, which now includes canned beer in addition to draught selections. Tree House is a non-distributing brewery—it is only available to buy on-site—and lines at the brewery can run an hour or more on certain days.

Although the new site has the capacity to produce nearly 150,000 US beer barrels (18,000,000 L; 4,600,000 US gal; 3,900,000 imp gal) of beer per year, compared with about 30,000 US beer barrels (3,500,000 L; 930,000 US gal; 770,000 imp gal) in the post-2014 Monson site, Lanier had said initially that they would not begin in Charlton by producing at maximum capacity: "We still think we can sell at least 30,000 barrels to a hyper-local market — whether that’s all in house or limited distribution throughout Massachusetts." The continuing success of Tree House is marked by the proposed addition to the Charlton site of a 16,000-square-foot (1,500 m^{2}) area which would include outdoor space and an expanded bar, as well as a 2,000-square-foot (190 m^{2}) mezzanine inside the existing space. Further, the burgeoning necessity of a traffic light on the road adjacent to the brewery indicates the heavy traffic driven by the brewery, and illustrates the need for the local community to aid in managing the impact of the brewery because of its popularity.

== Expansions ==
In February 2019, the Hartford Business Journal reported that Tree House purchased a 100-acre farm in Woodstock, Connecticut. This farm will help Tree House in expanding their range of offerings, from fresh fruit to sell at stands on site, as well as to use in further experimenting, as well as bolstering their forays into alternate methods of brewing, such as barrel aging and open fermentation.

In November 2020, it was announced that Tree House was planning expansions to both Cape Cod and Western Massachusetts, in an effort to relieve pressure on their Charlton campus; both locations opened in 2021. Furthermore, planned enhancements at the Charlton location include a series of on-site hiking/biking trails, an orchard of fruit trees, and a set of beehives.

It was announced in December 2020 that Tree House purchased the former Channing Bete headquarters in Deerfield, MA. The location opened January 2022, offering a taproom, pizza, immersive "beer can wall" and retail store.

In May 2022, it was announced that Tree House had purchased Tewksbury Country Club in Tewksbury MA, with plans to open a beer hall and retail store, while continuing to operate the golf course and other amenities. Tree House opened "The Outpost", a standalone beer to-go facility 5 months later in October 2022 with the full taproom opening in June 2023 offering an expansive taproom and lounge, roof deck, exterior patio, 9 hole rebranded golf course with two shipping container bars on the course, a pizza kitchen, and a full retail store featuring three custom "beer elevators" for beer to-go.

In October 2023, it was announced that Tree House purchased an 11-acre property, a former driving range, in Saratoga Springs, NY, with plans to open a brewery, taproom, and “expansive indoor and outdoor experience” across the street from the Saratoga Performing Arts Center on Route 9. It would be the brewer's sixth location overall and first outside of New England. The facility opened for beer to-go operations in December 2024, just over 6 months after breaking ground with the tasting room, outdoor patio, and retail area opening in March 2025 featuring a 40 foot long bar with 40 beer lines, a 360 degree 8 foot diameter fireplace, a pizza kitchen, retail area, covered patio, pavilion, pergola, and expansive lawn area complete with seating platforms.

In September 2024, following a series of pop-up outdoor beer gardens at the Prudential Center in Boston, Tree House launched a storefront in the Prudential Mall arcade and a drive-up operation in the parking garage within the "free loop" for beverages to-go making it the first time Tree House products would be available for purchase within Boston. The company then launched a retail kiosk in the central arcade for merchandise and kiosks to purchase beverages to-go. The company plans to continue the beer garden pop-up operation for the 2025 season.

== Beers ==
Tree House is particularly known for their production of American-style IPAs and stouts.

Tree House Rotational Beers
Beer Name	Beer Type	ABV (%)	Beer Advocate Rating (out of 5)
Alter Ego	American IPA	6.8	4.55
Bright	Double IPA	7.8	4.39
Bright w/ Citra	Double IPA	7.8	4.42
Doppelganger	American Double IPA	8.2	4.58
Eureka w/ Citra	American Blonde Ale	4.1	4.28
Green	American IPA	7.5	4.58
Haze	Double IPA	8.2	4.57
Julius	American IPA	6.8	4.66
Lights On	American IPA	5.3	4.34
Sap	American IPA	7.3	4.33
That's What She Said	Milk Stout	5.6	4.22

Selected Occasional Beers
Beer Name	Beer Type	ABV (%)	Beer Advocate Rating (out of 5)
Double Shot	American Stout	7.6	4.55
King Julius	Double IPA	8.2	4.73
Single Shot	Coffee Milk Stout	6.4	4.37
Trail Magic	German-style Pilsner	5.2	3.95

== See also ==
- Barrel-aged beer
- Beer in the United States § Craft beer
