= Brew Keeper =

Coordinates: 41°23′45″N 81°59′57″W

The Brew Keeper
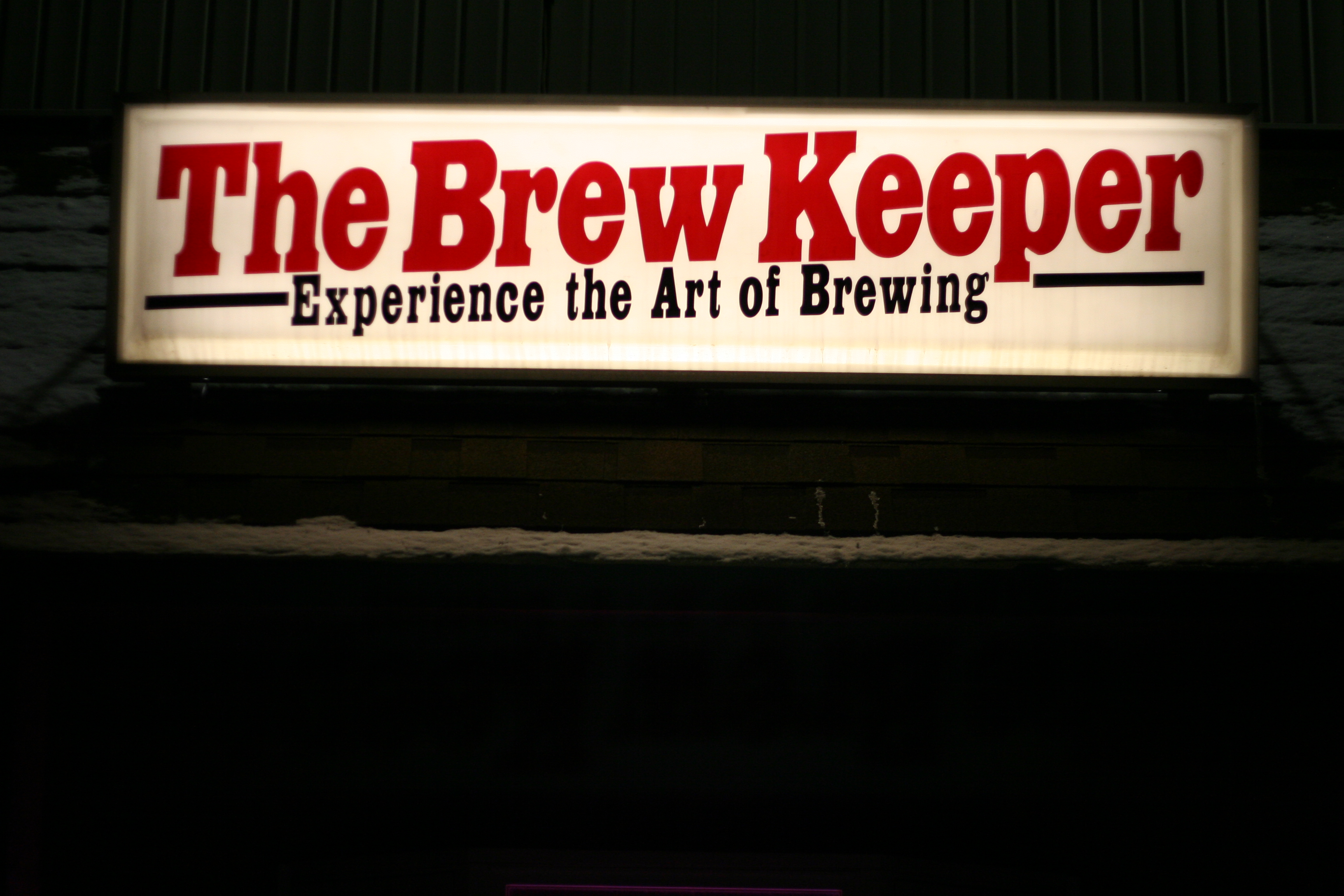
- The Brew Keeper sign
- Industry: Alcoholic beverage
- Founded: 1997
- Headquarters: North Ridgeville, Ohio, United States
- Products: Beer
- Production output: <2,500 barrels (<290,000 liters)
- Website: brewkeeper.com

The Brew Keeper was a brewery in North Ridgeville, Ohio, United States. It opened in 1997 in Bedford Heights, Ohio as a Brew-On-Premises (BOP) brewery, later adding taps and a restaurant after it moved to North Ridgeville, Ohio in 2007.

As a microbrewery, the Brew Keeper used the name Mad Brewer to denote their beer sold outside their facility in other drinking establishments and retail outlets. Their beers were mostly high-gravity, some reaching as high as 12% alcohol by volume which is the legal limit for the definition of beer in Ohio (typical beers have around 3% to 8% alcohol by volume).

The Brew Keeper closed in 2010 due to financial reasons.

== See also ==
- Beer in the United States
