= Williamsburg AleWerks =

Alewerks Brewing Company
- Industry: Alcoholic beverage
- Founded: 2006
- Headquarters: 189-B Ewell Road; Williamsburg, Virginia; United States
- Products: Beer
- Owner: Chuck Haines

Alewerks Brewing Company is a craft brewery in Williamsburg, Virginia, USA. It was established in 2006 by Chuck Haines on the site of the old Williamsburg Brewing Company. It is the oldest microbrewery still running in Williamsburg, recently celebrating their 10th anniversary. The brewery utilizes a direct fired brick-clad Peter Austin brew house which distinguishes it from many larger breweries which use a steam based process. The brewery offers tours of the facility and tasting sessions, and talks about the history of beer. Currently, they have 16 running taps in house with 6 core yearly beers, 4 seasonal selections, and 12 Brewmaster Reserve small batch selections distributed in Virginia, Washington D.C., and Pennsylvania.

Geoff Logan is the Brewmaster & Managing Director of Alewerks Brewing Company. He attended the American Brewer's Guild and is a member of the Master Brewer's Association, the Virginia Craft Brewer's Guild and the American Society of Brewing Chemists. Geoff is responsible not just for Alewerks' winning recipes but also for driving its creative and commercial vision.
