= Empyrean Brewing Company =

- Industry: Alcoholic beverage
- Founded: 1990; 36 years ago
- Headquarters: Lincoln, Nebraska
- Products: Beer
- Production output: 5,500 US barrels
- Owner: Telesis, Inc.

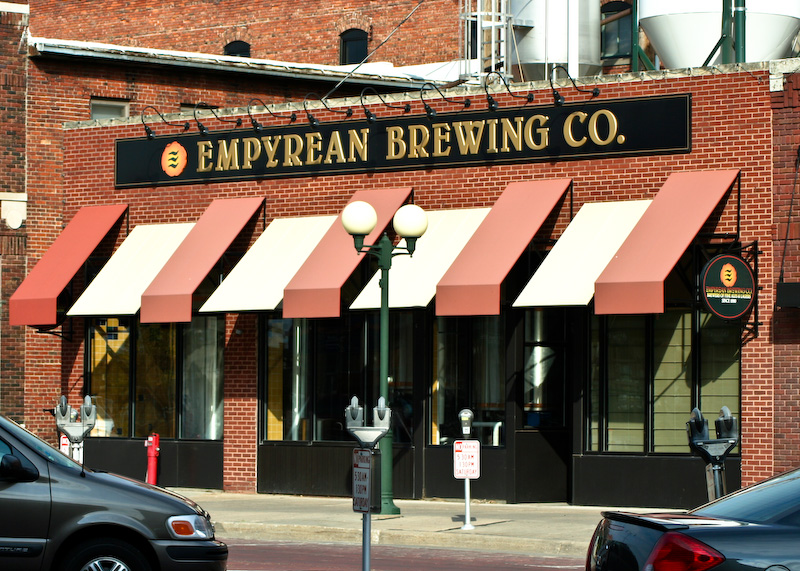
Empyrean's Brewhouse

Empyrean Brewing Company is a brewery in Lincoln, Nebraska, US. It was founded in 1990 by the holding company Telesis Inc.

== History ==
Empyrean Brewing Company in the Coffee and Spice Building

In 1997, Empyrean Brewing Company became a separate financial entity under the Telesis umbrella. As production increased, K & Z Distributing of Lincoln and Miller Brands of Omaha begin distributing Empyrean beer. One year after contracting with the distributors, Empyrean had over 70 draft contracts in Lincoln and Omaha and increased brewing capacity to 2,500 barrels.

The increasing popularity of the beers caused Empyrean owners to begin to consider bottling the beers for more widespread distribution. Empyrean began the bottling process in 1999 with their LunaSea ESB, Third Stone Brown and Chaco Canyon Honey Gold. In doing so, Empyrean became the first Nebraska craft brewery to bottle its beers.

In 2000, as the brewing capacity was increased again, Empyrean started a new brewhouse. By 2002, Empyrean became the first brewery in Nebraska to distribute across the entire state. At the 2006 World Beer Cup, the LunaSea ESB took the Silver medal in the English-Style Extra Special Bitter or Strong Bitter category.

== Company Information ==
Empyrean Brewing Company Logo

All of Empyrean's active beers are available on tap and in bottles, except for the nitrogenated Collapsar Oatmeal Stout, which is on tap only. In addition to their six regular beers, Empyrean consistently brews two additional beers, the Eccentric Seasonal Ale and the Lazlo's Limited. Usually, the Eccentric is chosen from the company's lineup of seasonal beers, while the Lazlo's Limited, available only at the Telesis-owned restaurants, is the champion of the "BeerQuest" competition for local homebrewers.

In addition to "BeerQuest", Empyrean sponsors several beer-related events in the Lincoln area. On the first non-holiday Monday of every month, Lazlo's Brewery and Grill in the Haymarket hosts "Cask Night", an event featuring two Empyrean beers that have been cask-conditioned. On the same night, the brewery next door opens its doors to the first 150 people to arrive to receive an exclusive tour of the brewery and a presentation from Head Brewer Rich Chapin. "Brewed Awakening" is a monthly event that pairs beers from all over the world with food that will complement them.
