= Beer in Canada =

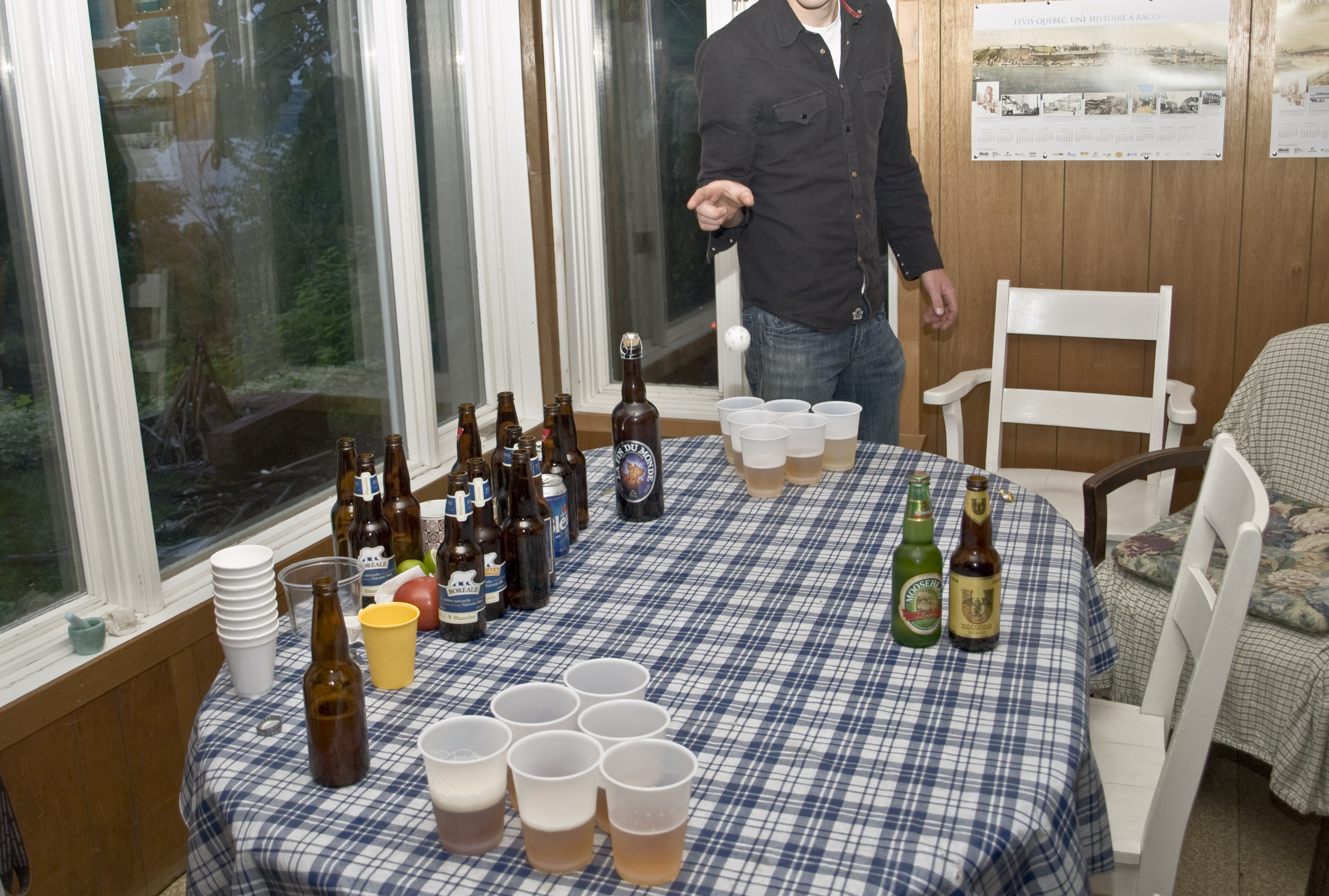
Bottles of beers from several Canadian-based breweries placed on a table being used to play beer pong

Beer was introduced to Canada by British settlers in the seventeenth century. The first commercial brewery was La Brasseries du Roy started by New France Intendant Jean Talon, in Québec City in 1668. Many commercial brewers thrived until prohibition in Canada. The provincial and federal governments' attempt to eliminate "intoxicating" beverages led to the closing of nearly three quarters of breweries between 1878 and 1928. It was only in the second half of the twentieth century that a significant number of new breweries opened up. The Canadian beer industry now plays an important role in Canadian identity, although globalization of the brewing industry has seen the major players in Canada acquired by or merged with foreign companies, notably its three largest beer producers: Labatt, Molson and Sleeman. The result is that Moosehead, with an estimated 3.8 percent share of the domestic market in 2016, has become the largest fully Canadian-owned brewer.

Beer sales have been sluggish overall in volume and in growth in industry revenue as other beverages have increased in popularity. Growth in revenue for beer makers averaged 1.3 per cent per year during 2011–2016; the estimated annual growth over the subsequent five years is only 0.4 percent per annum. Nonetheless, the number of licensed breweries in Canada increased from 310 in 2010 to 640 in 2015. Many of these are small operations since there were only 30 large (making over 7.5 million litres per year) breweries in 2015.

The Canadian craft brewing industry, despite seeing rapid growth between 2017 and 2022, has experienced a recent downturn attributed to an overall reduction in beer sales in the country.

== Popularity ==
Beer can be considered a culturally important aspect of the stereotypical Canadian's life. Beer is the most popular alcoholic beverage in Canada, in terms of both volume and dollar value.

Industry statistics indicated that in 2015, beer was the country's most popular alcoholic beverage and the products brewed in Canada held an 85 per cent share of the domestic market. The top selling style of beer in Canada is, by far, the pale lager. This type is also called North American Style Lager (by the Canadian Brewing Awards). In 2016, the best-selling brand was Budweiser, with many of its products manufactured in Canada.

While Canada's population is growing, sales of beer have increased only minimally. The volume of beer sold increased by only 1.7 per cent per year in the previous decade. Of that, domestic beer accounted for 1.1 per cent of the increase, while imports made up the balance. In terms of market share in dollar value, beer's share dropped from 47.9 per cent to 42 per cent in ten years, mostly due to the increasing popularity of wine. Imported beer sales, in volume, have grown significantly, increasing at an annual average rate of 6.0% between 2004 and 2014.

The annual Canadian Brewing Awards recognizes the best beers in Canada using blind taste tests. Most of the winning beers tend to be from craft brewers, however, some larger brewers continue to place well.

== History ==
Beer was first introduced to Canada by European settlers in the seventeenth century, as Canada had an ideal climate for making beer before refrigeration was introduced. However, the preferred drink of the citizens of New France was imported wine or brandy. Although the first commercial brewery was built by Louis Prud'homme in Montreal (then Fort Ville-Marie) in 1650, it failed. Jean Talon, the first appointed Intendant of New France put limits on the amount of wine and spirits that could be imported and established the La brasserie de Roy in Quebec City, in the year 1668. This brewery also failed after Talon returned to France in 1672 and import limits were increased. What instead sprung up was the development of spruce beer, both alcoholic and non-alcoholic.

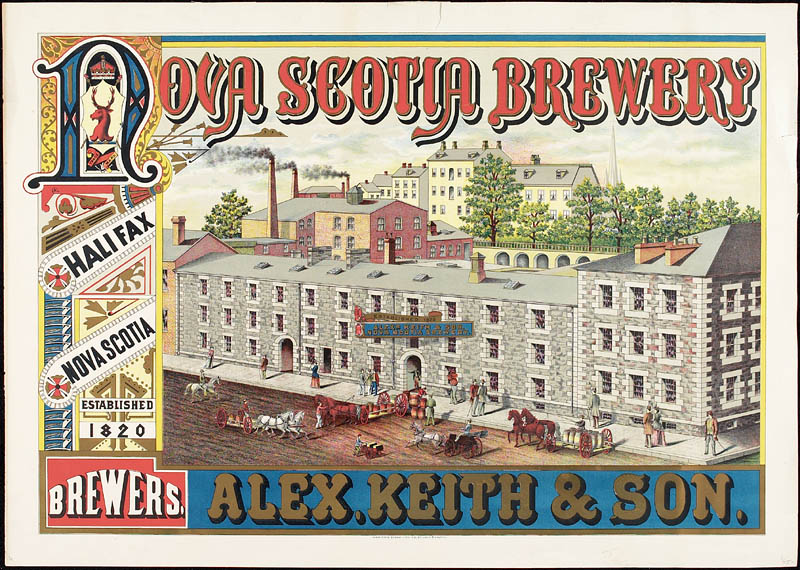
Depiction of Alexander Keith's Brewery in Halifax, Nova Scotia, c. 1865–70

After the fall of New France, the numerous British soldiers in the Canadian British colonies in the eighteenth century was a benefit to breweries since the troops were each entitled to six pints of beer per day. Most preferred ales and other heavy beers, not lager. Another important base of customers was the British Loyalists that immigrated from the newly independent United States to Canada. During those centuries and into the nineteenth, a number of commercial brewers thrived, including some that became the staple of the Canadian industry: John Molson founded a brewery in Montreal in 1786, Alexander Keith in Halifax in 1820, Thomas Carling in London in 1840, John Kinder Labatt in 1847, also in London, Susannah Oland in Halifax in 1867, and Eugene O'Keefe in Toronto in 1891. The Upper Canada government issued a patent on July 6, 1842, to George Riley of Kingston, Upper Canada for "an improved method of brewing ale, beer, porter, and other malt liquors." Molson's is the oldest surviving Canadian brewing enterprise.

Prohibition in Canada did not last as long as in the U.S. and was largely over by the mid-1920s, apart from Prince Edward Island, where it ran from 1901 to 1948. By comparison, the Temperance Act in Ontario ran from 1916 to 1927. The relatively large and powerful beer manufacturing sector - and the huge working class that purchased their products - failed to convince any of the provincial governments to reverse their stance on prohibition.

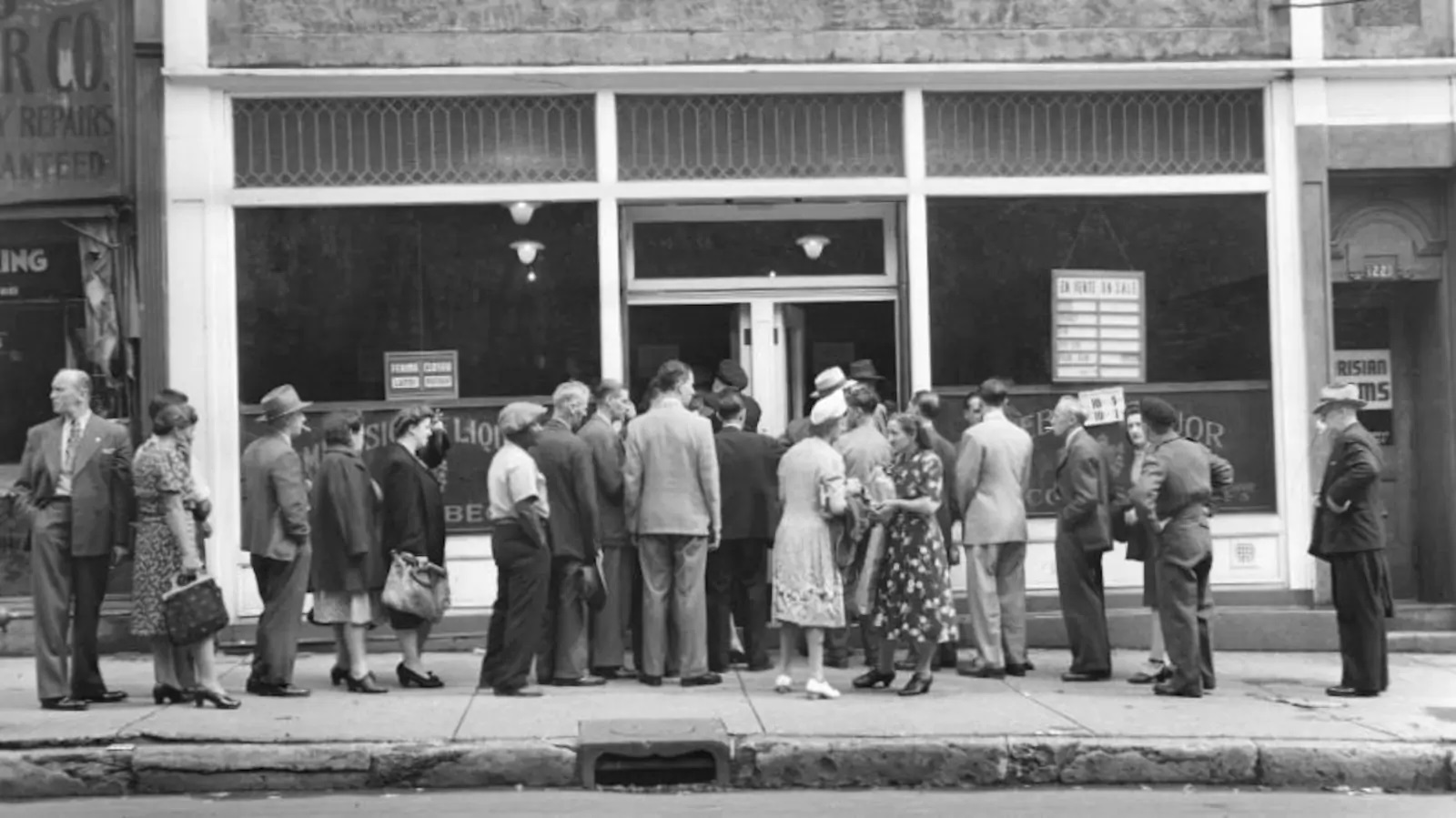
Queues outside a Commission des liqueurs du Québec store, 1945. The end of prohibition in Canada saw a number of its provincial alcohol authorities created and charged with the distribution of alcohol.

After the ending of prohibition, the sale of alcoholic beverages remained heavily controlled by government liquor boards and publicly owned stores in each of the provinces. Public drinking returned to jurisdictions often several years after the end of prohibition. The controls led to the growth of "beer parlours" also known as "taverns" which had no bar, did not serve meals and people sat and drank at cafe tables, where the beer was delivered by the glass, patrons could not move between tables, could not stand up with a drink and had other restrictions. Many beer parlours were segregated by sex, and had a men's only room, and a room for "ladies and escorts". The beer parlours, where often the only thing allowed was to drink and was often the only place to drink in town was considered a factor in making beer a national drink of Canada.

A period of consolidation occurred after the ending of prohibition and the brewing industry became extremely concentrated in Canada by the 1960s, dominated by just three companies ( Canadian Breweries, Molson and Labatt). Together, all three had bought or merged dozens of smaller breweries, sometimes moving their products to another brewery or closed outright.

=== Foreign ownership and consolidation ===
In 1969, Canadian Breweries was sold to the Rothmans International multinational and renamed Carling O'Keefe. After a brief ownership by Australian Elders XL, Carling O'Keefe merged with Molson in 1989, then merged with US company Coors in 2005 to create Molson Coors, now the world's fifth-largest brewing company. Labatt's was purchased in 1995 by the Belgian company Interbrew (now part of Brazilian-Belgian Anheuser-Busch InBev, the world's largest brewing company). With the purchase of Sleeman Breweries, the largest remaining Canadian brewer, in 2006 by the Japanese-owned Sapporo Brewery, Canada's beer production has been mainly under the control of multinational companies, mostly foreign-owned.

By the end of 2006, nearly 90 per cent of beer sales was brewed domestically under license from non-domestic corporations. American beers brewed under license have become the top sellers in the market, and by 2008 Budweiser was the top-selling brand with 13 per cent of the market, followed by Coors Light with 12 per cent. Molson Canadian and Labatt Blue, for decades the top-selling brands, now hold third and fourth place.

According to Agriculture Canada, the three major breweries accounted for approximately 90 per cent of retail sales in 2012. While annual exports, primarily to the U.S. are significant, industry analysts expect a decline at an annualized rate of 1.6 per cent starting in 2016, due to the increasing popularity of U.S. brewed products. As well, Canada was a net importer of beer in 2014, with imports totalling CA$671.2 million (including 24 per cent from the U.S.) against exports of CA$215.4 million.

A merger between Anheuser-Busch InBev and SABMiller closed on October 10, 2016. The new company, Anheuser-Busch InBev SA/NV, is trading on the Brussels stock exchange as ABI.BR and as BUD on the New York stock exchange. SABMiller ceased trading on global stock markets.

As per the agreement with the regulators, SABMiller sold to Molson Coors full ownership of SABMiller, including the Miller brand portfolio. Molson Coors now owns all of MillerCoors; the latter is "the U.S. business unit of Molson Coors". As a result, Molson Coors regained the right to make and market Miller Genuine Draft and Miller Lite in Canada.

The largest fully Canadian-owned brewer, Moosehead Breweries, controlled about 3.8 per cent of the Canadian market in 2016.

=== Growth of microbreweries ===
The revival of craft brewing dates from the early 1980s, according to Ian Coutts, in his book Brew North: How Canadians Made Beer and Beer Made Canada as a result of disparate and random factors. The factors included an article in May/June 1978 issue of Harrowsmith magazine by a former O'Keefe employee decrying the state of the business, the creation of the Campaign for Real Ale in the United Kingdom, the revival of smaller brewers in the United States beginning with Anchor Brewing in 1965, the 1981 deregulation of beer prices in British Columbia by minister Peter Hyndman and the resulting price hikes by the "Big Three". In June 1982, the Horseshoe Bay Brewery in West Vancouver opened, creating one of Canada's first microbreweries.

Despite the dominance of the foreign-controlled major brewers, the numbers of microbreweries has been increasing. There were 88 microbreweries in 2006. There was a 50 per cent increase in the number of independents between 2010 and 2015. By that year, there were 640 licensed breweries in Canada. That number may be as high as it will go. The trend is that as one microbrewery closes another opens to take its place.

Craft beer sales are increasing. In Ontario (the province with the largest population) for example, there was a minimal increase in sales volume for the majors' products while craft beer sales increased by nearly 36 per cent in 2015. Beer produced by microbreweries ("craft beer") accounted for 10% of the Canadian beer market in 2015, and the microbrewery industry has been experiencing rapid growth.

The growth, particularly in sales volume, is particularly noteworthy in Ontario, where craft brewers experienced a 36 per cent increase in sales in 2015. In mid-2016, there were 140 such breweries operating in Ontario. British Columbia's craft beer industry has also experienced major growth, from 54 in 2010 to 118 such operations in 2015. These small British Columbia breweries benefitted from a 35% increase in the volume of beer produced in 2016 vs. 2015. On a Canada-wide basis, demand for craft beer is steadily increasing and the maturity point (peak) for this industry is still a long way off, according to Taps magazine, published by the parent of the Canadian Brewing Awards.

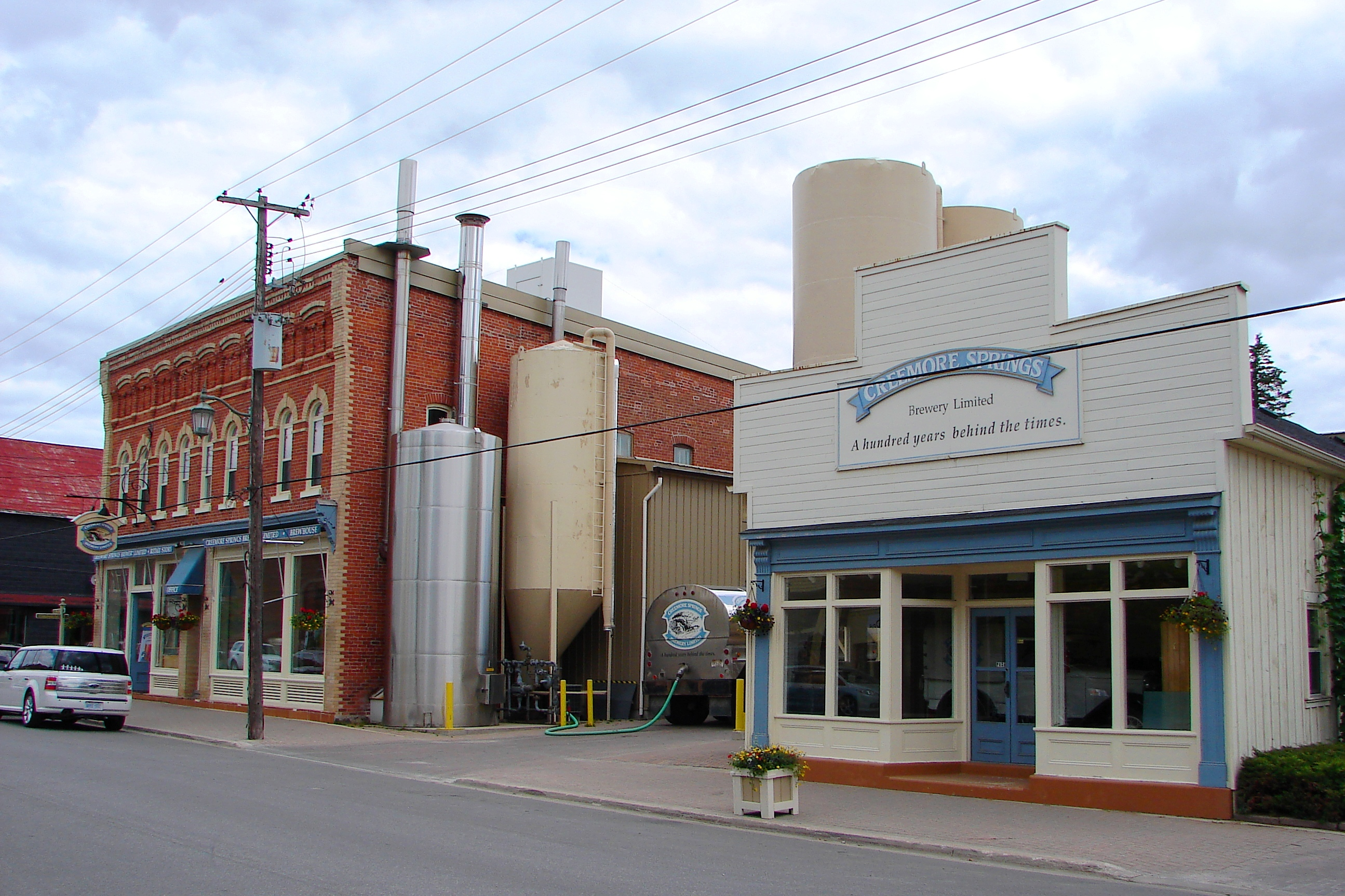
Exterior of Creemore Springs brewery in Creemore, Ontario. Creemore Springs was one of many microbreweries that was acquired by a larger "macrobrewery".

One way the "macrobreweries" have dealt with the threat of this slow but steady growth of Canadian craft brewers is by buying them outright. For example, Creemore Springs of Creemore, Ontario was bought by Molson Coors in 2005, and Creemore subsequently acquired Granville Island Brewing in 2010. Mill Street Brewery of Toronto, Ontario, was purchased by Labatt in late 2015; after the acquisition had been completed, Mill St purchased Brickworks Ciderhouse and brought it under the Labatt umbrella of companies as well. In October 2015, Labatt had also purchased Turning Point Brewery, a craft beer maker in Delta, BC that brews Stanley Park beers. Other craft beers owned by major companies include Hop City owned by Moosehead, Unibroue and Upper Canada Brewing Company owned by Sleeman (and hence Sapporo).

== Styles ==
In most of Canada, the most popular types are pale lagers like Molson Canadian and Labatt Blue from the big breweries. In Quebec and the Maritimes, lager-like ales such as Molson Export and Alexander Keith's are also popular.

=== Canadian styles ===
==== Cream ale ====
Although cream ale (referring to a creamy head) was an offshoot of North American light lager, this type is brewed as an ale, in accordance with individual brewers' preferences. Despite its name, a cream ale does not include lactose. One definition from the US suggests that cream ale in North America is "somewhat of a hybrid ... fermented like an ale at warm temperatures, but then stored at cold temperatures for a period of time, much as a lager would be. The resultant brew has the unchallenging crisp characteristics of a light pale lager, but is endowed with a hint of the aromatic complexities that ales provide. Pale in color, they are generally more heavily carbonated and more heavily hopped than light lagers." In the US, this type can also include Kentucky common beer or cream beer, although this version is rarely brewed commercially today.

The cream ale from Kilkenny (beer) in Ireland bears no resemblance to North American made cream ales. It is similar to Guinness with a nitrogenated cream head, but with "50% less carbonation than regular beers".

The most widely distributed brand in Canada is the Sleeman Cream Ale - first crafted in the late 1800s by George Sleeman and possibly the first genuine iteration of Canadian cream ale. Sleeman Breweries current product, "crafted from ... the original Sleeman family recipe book" is described by the maker as "an authentic North American style [that] combines the easy drinking nature of a lager and the rich fruity character of an ale". Muskoka Brewery (a large craft brewer with 130 employees) also markets a cream ale across Ontario (at LCBO and The Beer Store), as do some smaller brewers. Muskoka describes its product as "... with its rich amber colour and inviting floral tones, ... a Cascade hoppiness and fuller body of flavour, ...".

Naturally, craft brewers' products, especially from other provinces—such as Montreal's McAuslan Cream Ale and Vancouver's R&B Raven Cream Ale—are entirely different in most aspects.

==== Ice beer ====
Ice beer originated in Canada, although it is essentially based on the German Eisbock style of beer. The first ice beer marketed in the United States was "Molson Ice" which was introduced in April 1993, although the process was patented earlier by Labatt, instigating the so-called "Ice Beer Wars" of the 1990s. Common ice beer brands in Canada in 2017, with approximately 5.5 to 6 per cent alcohol content, include Carling Ice, Molson Keystone Ice, Busch Ice, Old Milwaukee Ice, Brick's Laker Ice and Labatt Ice. There is a Labatt Maximum Ice with a 7.1 per cent alcohol content.

One generic process of icing beer involves lowering the temperature of a batch of beer until ice crystals form. Since alcohol has a much lower freezing point (−114 °C; −173.2 °F) than water and does not form crystals when the ice is filtered off, this creates a concoction with a higher volume ratio of alcohol to water and therefore creating a beer with a higher alcohol content by volume. The process is known as "fractional freezing" or "freeze distillation".

Labatt patented a specific method for making ice beer in 1997, 1998 and 2000 which is described as: "A process for chill-treating, which is exemplified by a process for preparing a fermented malt beverage wherein brewing materials are mashed with water and the resulting mash is heated and wort separated therefrom. The wort is boiled cooled and fermented and the beer is subjected to a finishing stage, which includes ageing, to produce the final beverage. The improvement comprises subjecting the beer to a cold stage comprising rapidly cooling the beer to a temperature of about its freezing point in such a manner that ice crystals are formed therein in only minimal amounts. The resulting cooled beer is then mixed for a short period of time with a beer slurry containing ice crystals, without any appreciable collateral increase in the number of ice crystals in the resulting mixture. Finally, the so-treated beer is extracted from the mixture." The company provides the following explanation for the layman: "During this unique process, the temperature is reduced until fine ice crystals form in the beer. Then using an exclusive process, the crystals are removed. The result is a full-flavoured balanced beer."

Since 1994 a small craft brewery called Old Credit Brewing in Port Credit, Mississauga, has been making an ice aged beer. This process involves fermenting the beer at a lower temperature than other products and then ageing it for eight weeks between -2 and −2.5 °C. This helps to remove the bitter aftertaste, give clarity of flavour, and increase the shelf life of the beer. Unlike other processes, ice crystals are not formed in order to keep the alcohol content at 5% ABV. The final product is a smooth, easy-drinking craft beer.

There is a much older German process called "Eisbock". "By cooling beer to just below freezing, you separate out a large portion of water from the alcohol, which has a lower freezing point. You then skim off the ice crystals from the brew leaving behind a beer that is twice as potent as the original." That produces a beer with 12 to 15 per cent alcohol. In North America, water would be added to lower the alcohol level.

==== Spruce beer ====
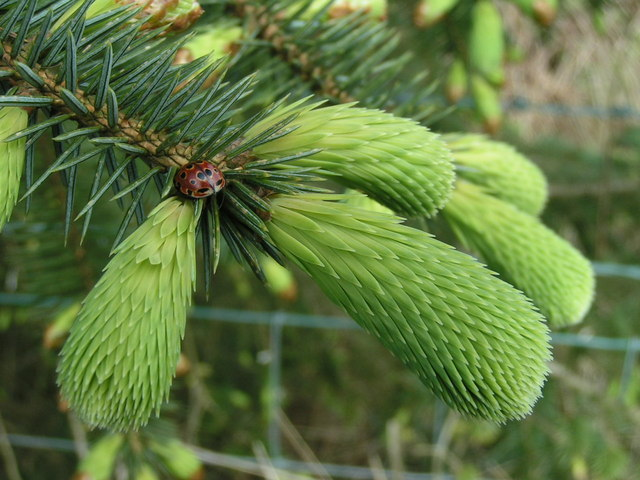
Spruce growth on a spruce tree. Parts of a spruce tree are used to flavour spruce beer.

Spruce beer originated in 16th-century New France, initially as a method for preventing scurvy. The Huron and other First Nations groups living along the St. Lawrence were likely the first people to brew it; their recipes were later combined with the settlers' fermenting and yeasting practices.

The primary benefit of spruce beer or 'epinette' was to prevent scurvy; it was used for that purpose by Jacques Cartier and his explorers when they arrived in Stadacona in what is now Quebec in 1535. Within a few decades of settlement, it had evolved into a formal style of beer, more commonly consumed by Canadians than any ale or lager, or indeed any kind of wine or spirit in Canada. It was still commonplace until the 1960s in Quebec but is now largely restricted to a select few microbreweries and restaurants, such as Garrison Brewery in Halifax, Nova Scotia. Both alcoholic and non-alcoholic varieties exist, although the latter is now the most common by far.

However, despite the immense popularity of beer in Quebec, and in Canada generally, the non-alcoholic "soda" version has maintained a more widespread appeal. The commercial versions are alcohol-free but spruce beer is often home-brewed in bathtubs and bottled on rooftops in order to allow the sunlight to aid with natural fermentation. Although commercial production of this non-alcoholic style has grown in recent years, the main provider is still famed casse-croute restaurant Paul Patates in Montreal - using a recipe dating from 1896. Notwithstanding its relative obscurity, spruce beer is an authentic Canadian style of beer, as well as one of the oldest forms of beer in North America.

In addition to its unique main ingredient of spruce tips, epinette is also distinguished from other styles of beer from its use of a top-fermented yeast with no malt whatsoever, the addition of toasted bread as well as roasted grain in stages during the brewing process, for its short, in-barrel fermentation period of 24 hours, and for the use of maple syrup, brown sugar, molasses or birch syrup as flavouring agents. Epinette is also typically unhopped.

=== Light beer ===
In the US, light beer sales are close to 50% of the total, while in Canada such beer constitutes under 30% of consumption. In fact, Plato Logic, a beer marketing specialist, estimated in August 2015 that such beer totals only 20 per cent of total volume of sales but adds that this category has been growing at 2.1 per cent annually over the past five years. Although the alcohol level is also lower, usually 4 percent vs. 5 percent for regular beer, the primary appeal of light beer is the calorie count but also the light almost 'non-beer' taste [for some consumers] and the successful marketing campaigns". In the top ten best-selling beers of the hundreds of brands sold by The Beer Store in Ontario, there are two light beers listed: Bud Light and Coors Light. Other sources also acknowledge these two, plus Miller Lite as best sellers in many provinces."

The caloric content can vary significantly from brand to brand and even in products of the same brand. Nutrition information is not available on the packaging since beer manufacturers are not required to include such data. However, some manufacturers' web sites and others for health-conscious consumers do provide relevant data for at least for certain brands. (Some sources publish calorie data for a 341ml or 12-ounce container, as the most common size, while others provide it for a 473 ml (16.6 imp fl oz) tall-boy can; this can create confusion.) For example, nutrition specifics are readily available for all Sleeman beers in 341ml bottles on the Fat Secret Web site. In this brand's standard Original Draught there are 146 calories, 180 in the Clear Ale and Honey Brown but only 90 calories in their Light beer and 80 calories for Clear 2.0.

The average for various brands of Canadian beer in 341ml containers (12-ounce) is roughly 140 to 150 calories for regular beer and approximately 100 calories for light beer. Consumers who are weight conscious may not be aware that beer can also be high in carbohydrates. The data can be even more difficult to find except for beer that is much lower than average in carbs. Data is readily available for the full Sleeman line, however. Consumers will get 12g of carbs in the Original Draught, roughly comparable to the 12 to 13g average cited by some sources. However, Sleeman Cream Ale and Honey Brown contain 18g and 19g of carbs, respectively. This company's Light beer contains only 4g of carbs which is lower than the 5 to 6g industry average cited by some sources. Their Clear 2.0 product is marketed primarily on the basis of low carbs: 2.0g per bottle. Though not as heavily advertised, Molson Canadian 67 also contains only 2g of carbs, and is even lower in calories at 67 per bottle (vs. 80).

Of course, beer connoisseurs usually rate regular beers as preferable to the light, and especially to the ultra-light, beers. For example, reviews generally consider Molson Canadian 67 to be too light in taste, without the rich beer flavour of more highly rated products. Consumers who evaluate beer on Web sites such as Beer Advocate and Rate Beer consider the ultra-light beers such as Molson Canadian 67 and Sleeman Clear 2.0 as refreshing at best and bland or watered down at worst. Nonetheless, consumers who prefer not to give up beer while on a diet can certainly find several options that get at least acceptable ratings, especially in the moderately low calorie/carb category. For example, the winners of the Light (Calorie-Reduced) Lager category in the 2016 Canadian Brewing Awards included Labatt's Bud Light, Moosehead's Cracked Canoe and Molson Coors' Coors Light. (According to the organizers, "This competition is judged by approximately 40 Certified Beer Judges (BJCP) who consider five criteria: aroma, appearance, flavour, mouth-feel, and overall impression when judging the beer".)

=== Craft brewing ===
There is no consistent definition of a craft brewery or microbrewery across Canada. In fact, the various provincial governments only define categories such as small brewery, microbrewery, macro brewery and nano brewery, with each classification depending on the number of hectolitres produced and that number varies from province to province. Still, most of the craft brewers tend to be small and locally owned, often by families. Some such breweries have been sold to major corporations but they are still referred to as craft brewers by most news media; after such a change in ownership, however, they may no longer qualify as members of the Provincial craft brewers associations.

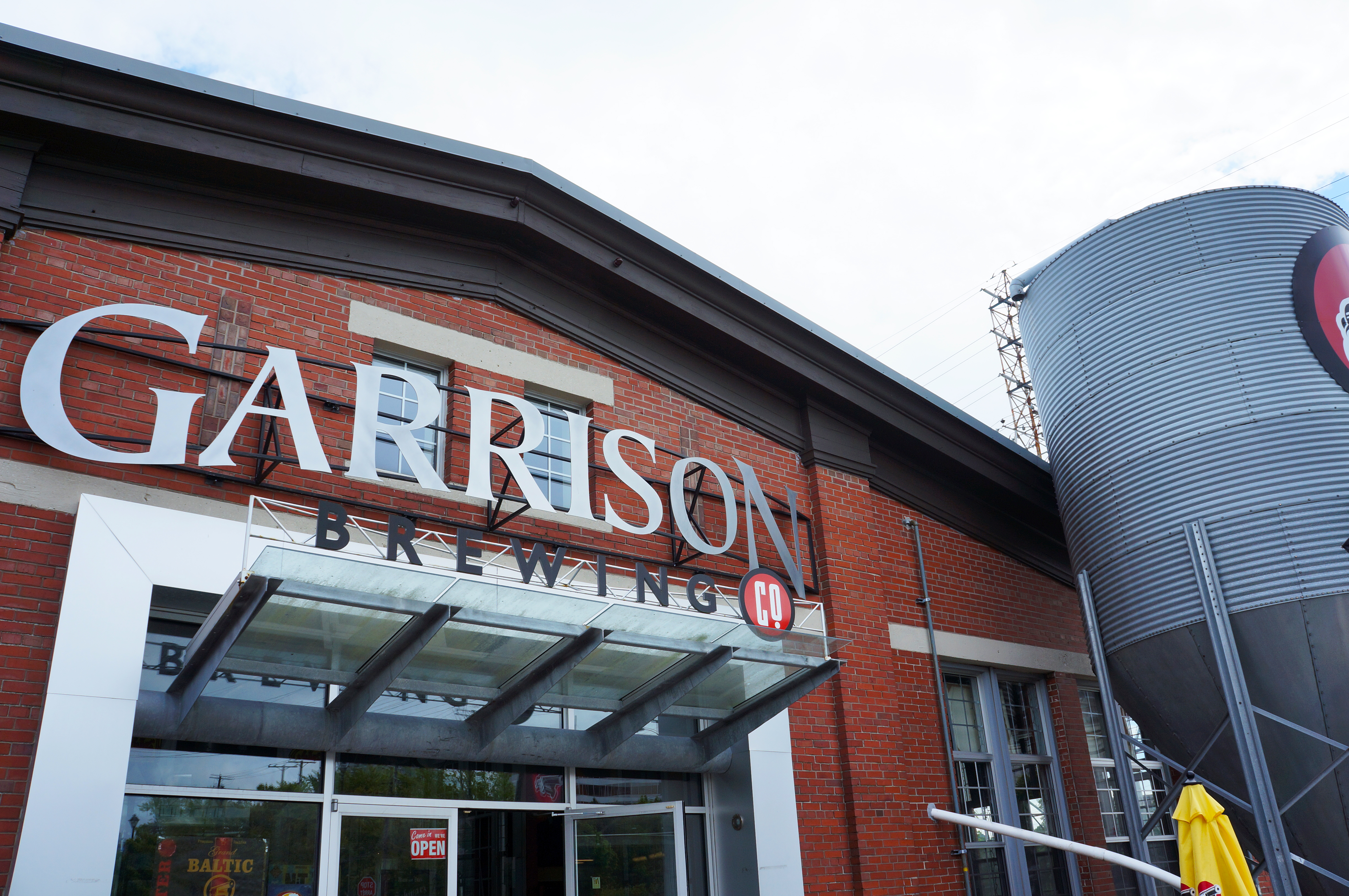
Brewpub for Garrison Brewing in Halifax, Nova Scotia

Most microbrewers sell a small number of beer brands and often specialize in types or styles. Some of these also brew cider, a fermented fruit drink. Depending on the province, off-site retail sales may be limited to government-regulated retailers. Some operate solely as brewpubs, their entire output only for sale on-site.

Bottle sales predominate among microbreweries, including the large Growler (jug). Increasingly, craft brewers are packaging at least some of their products in aluminum cans. For example, Ottawa's Beyond The Pale Brewing Co. once used only bottles, including one- and two-litre growlers, but the company added a canning system in 2015. "If you are trying to put out a premium product, it's better for the beer to be in cans. It's more convenient, it's better for the environment, it makes a lot of sense," said co-owner Rob McIsaac. Most of their beer is now sold in cans. Cameron's Brewing Company in Mississauga, Ontario, also sell the majority of their beer in cans. Craft brewer Black Bridge in Saskatchewan is strongly in favour of cans, due to the lower weight ("we can transport more beer while reducing our carbon footprint") and much greater resistance to light and oxygen that can reduce shelf life in addition to lower packaging and shipping costs.

Three provinces provided major support to small brewers in 2015. Ontario invested CA$1.6 million to assist 20 craft breweries in expanding and in marketing. B.C. announced CA$10 million in support to their breweries through a 25 per cent reduction in the provincial liquor distribution board's mark-up for local beers. Alberta's new grant program was expected to provide CA$20 million in assistance to craft brewers.

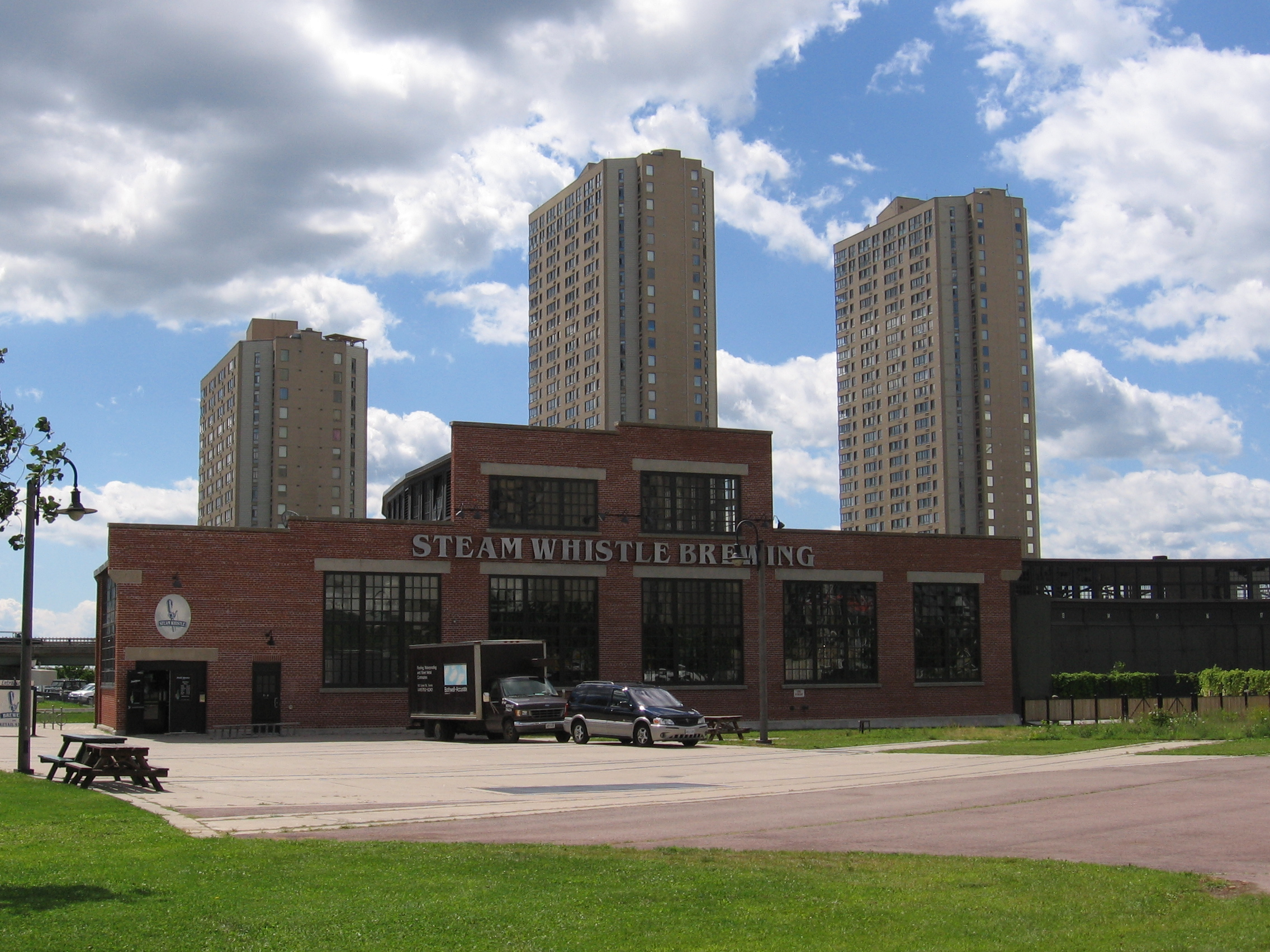
Steam Whistle Brewing in Toronto was one of several micro-breweries to be established in the late-20th century.

The first contemporary Canadian craft brewer was Horseshoe Bay Brewing, founded in Vancouver in 1982. This was followed by many others, including Spinnakers Brewpub in Victoria (1984), Vancouver Island Brewery in Victoria (1984), Granville Island Brewing of Vancouver (1984), Brick Brewery of Waterloo (1984), Connor's Brewery of Mississauga (1984), Granite Brewery of Halifax (1985), Wellington Brewery of Guelph (1985), Big Rock Brewery of Calgary (1985), Upper Canada Brewing Company of Toronto (1985), McAuslan Brewing of Montreal (1989), Old Credit Brewing of Mississauga (1994), Muskoka Springs Brewery (1995), Neustadt Springs Brewery (1997), La Barberie of Quebec City (1997) and Steam Whistle Brewing of Toronto (2000). Microbreweries and brewpubs have continued to expand since.

== Brewing in Canada's regions ==
Jason Foster, a beer columnist for CBC Radio One's Radio Active and Vue Weekly and the creator of onbeer.org, argues that Canadian regional styles of craft brewing reflect the history and culture of those regions, often based on the origins of the people who settled there. He argues, for example, that Atlantic Canada is associated with the British styles and Quebec with Belgian styles due to their settlement history. Ontario has a more "mainstream", "conservative" style — with German and eastern American influences. British Columbia has an "eccentric" style, influenced by the U.S. West Coast, with a noted presence of fruit beers and organic beers drawing from that region's culture of environmentalism.

However, it makes little sense to say that Canadian beer is merely the sum of its parts, or takes all of its influence from other styles. Brands like Molson Export, Moosehead and Sleeman, for example, led the way in crafting a softer and more palatable style of ale and lager for North American audiences, while still retaining strength. For example, Canadian-style ales - pale or dark - tend to be maltier than their American equivalents and more bitter than their English cousins.

According to Beer Advocate, as of 2012, 46 of Canada's top 100 beers were brewed in Quebec, 25 in British Columbia, 13 in Ontario, 6 in Alberta, 4 in Manitoba, 4 in Nova Scotia, and 2 in Yukon.

=== Atlantic provinces ===
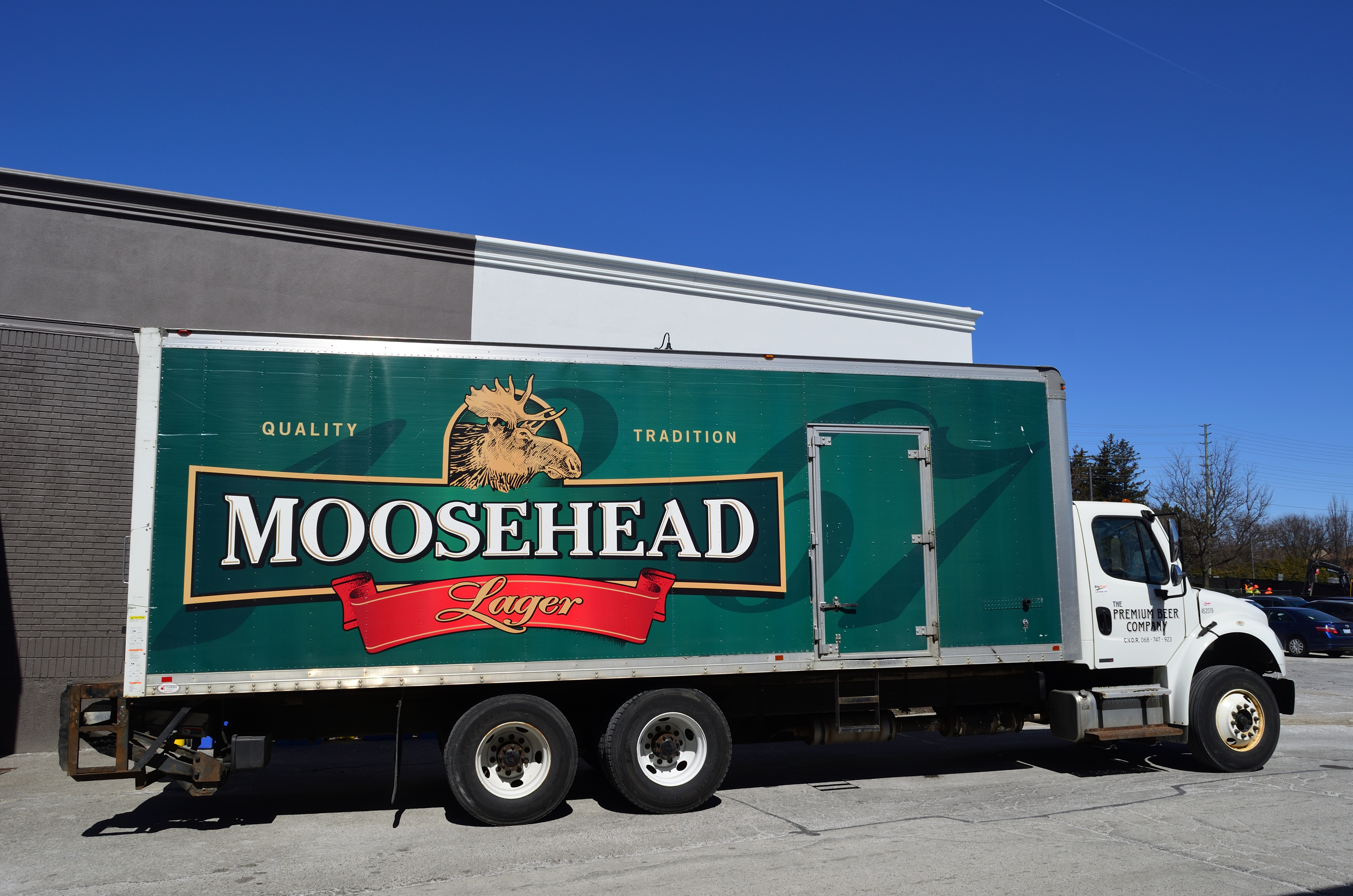
A Moosehead Breweries delivery truck. The company is Canada's oldest independent brewery.

Moosehead Breweries Limited is Canada's oldest independent brewery, located in Saint John, New Brunswick. The brewery was founded in 1867 and is privately owned and operated by the Oland family.

All four of the top 100 Beer Advocate Canadian beers brewed in Atlantic Canada are brewed in Halifax, Nova Scotia. Three of these are made by Propeller, and one by Garrison. By 2017, there were at least 41 microbreweries throughout Nova Scotia alone. That year, there were also 25 hop growers in the Maritime Provinces (part of the Atlantic provinces), and they were producing some 25 varieties of hops.

=== Quebec ===
Forty-six of the top 100 beers in Canada are brewed in Quebec, according to Beer Advocate. The ratings are led by Dieu du Ciel of Montreal (with 17), and followed by Unibroue of Chambly (10), Microbrasserie Charlevoix of Baie-Saint-Paul (7), Les Trois Mousquetaires of Brossard (5), McAuslan Brewing of Montreal (3), and Le Trou Du Diable of Shawinigan, L'Amère à Boire of Montreal, Brasseurs Illimités of Saint-Eustache, and Hopfenstark of L'Assomption, with one each.

The Mondial de la Bière was founded in 1994 in Montreal and attracts around 80,000 people, while Quebec City held its first beer festival, the Festibière, in 2009.

=== Ontario ===
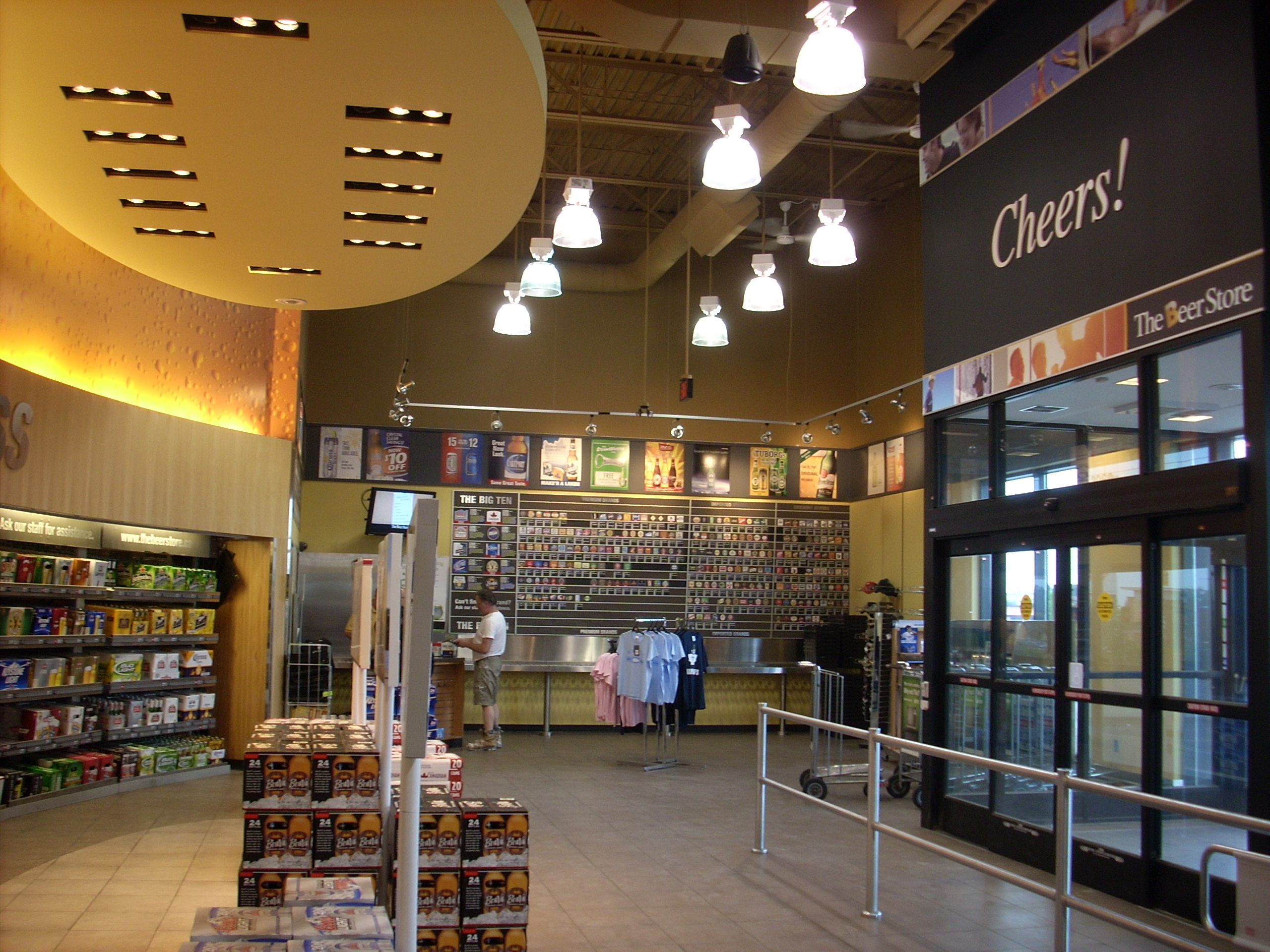
Interior of The Beer Store in London, Ontario. The Beer Store is the largest distributor of beers in the province of Ontario.

Including the major's production plants, there were roughly 188 breweries in this province in 2016. Of beers brewed in Canada, 13 of the 100 top-ranked beers were brewed in Ontario in 2011, according to user-submitted ratings on the website Beer Advocate. Barnstormer Brewing and Distilling brews three of these, BrewBlack Oak of Etobicoke brews three of these, followed by Denison's of Toronto, Muskoka Cottage Brewery of Bracebridge, and Wellington of Guelph with two apiece. Flying Monkeys of Barrie, Spearhead of Etobicoke, Creemore Springs of Creemore, and Great Lakes of Etobicoke (not to be confused with Great Lakes of Cleveland) brew one top beer apiece.

About 80 per cent of Ontario's consumer beer trade is handled by The Beer Store, a government-instituted, privately owned monopoly founded in 1927 as Brewer's Retail. The chain is owned by Anheuser-Busch InBev (of Belgium), Molson Coors (incorporated in the United States), and Sapporo Brewery (of Japan). This unique situation has enabled these companies to earn an estimated one billion dollars in profit per year. The other 20% is handled by the Liquor Control Board of Ontario (LCBO), a Crown corporation. Smaller brewers, which tend to focus on German and English styles, are represented by the Ontario Craft Brewers trade association. The Beer Store's share will decrease over time. In December 2016, some 60 supermarkets were given a license to sell six packs and this is expected to increase to over 150 such locations during 2017.

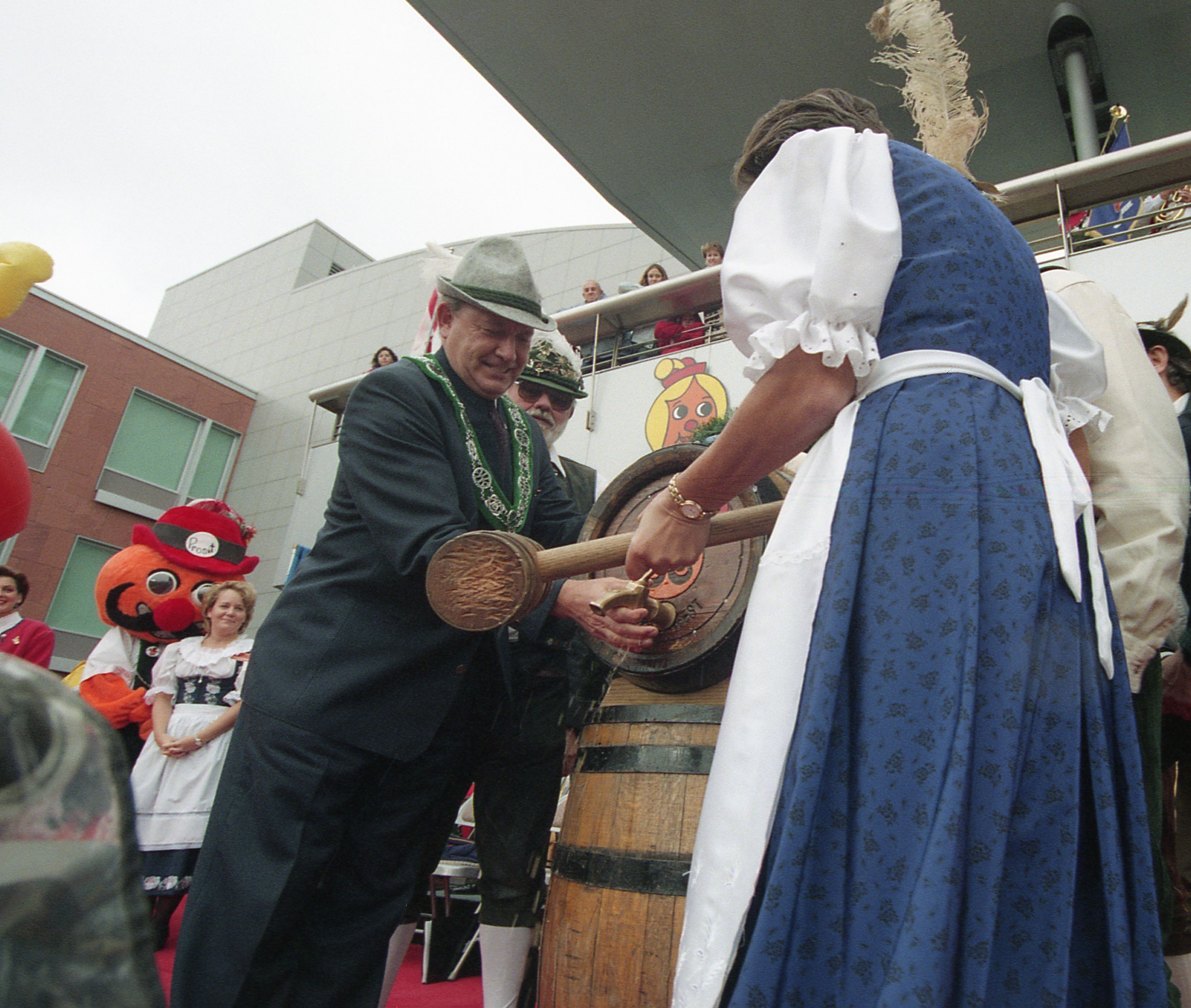
A keg of beer is tapped open during the Kitchener-Waterloo Oktoberfest in 2015.

The Kitchener-Waterloo Oktoberfest is a nine-day event in Kitchener-Waterloo, which started in 1969 influenced by the original German Oktoberfest. It is held every October, starting on the Friday before Canadian Thanksgiving and running until the Saturday after. The event has had an exclusive sponsorship agreement with Molson Coors for some years. Since craft brewers cannot participate, the Waterloo-Wellington Craft Collective started their own Kitchener-Waterloo event, Craftoberfest, in 2016, serving beers from over 20 small, independent brewers.

Toronto's Festival of Beer was first held in 1995 at Fort York in Toronto and has been held at Exhibition Place since 2009. In 2011, the Toronto Festival of Beer also launched the Queer Beer Festival, a separate one-day event marketed toward Toronto's lesbian, gay, bisexual and transgender community. There is also the Lauder Beer Festival, which is a much smaller festival held in the north end of Toronto. A beer festival also took place in Ottawa in 2003. Beau's All Natural Brewing Company, located in Vankleek Hill, is the host company of Oktoberfest in the Ottawa area. The 2011 edition was a sellout, drawing an estimated 8,500-9,000 guests over the course of three days. The Golden Tap Awards is an annual beer awards event held in Toronto. The awards are sponsored and presented by The Bar Towel, a website and forum dedicated to the discussion and promotion of Toronto's craft and microbrew beer scene.

In 2010, the Ontario Craft Brewers, the association of "small, local, independently-owned craft breweries" started Ontario Craft Beer Week, a week-long craft beer celebration across the province. This event gets funding from the Government of Ontario.

New microbreweries established in the 2010s have included All or Nothing Brewhouse in Oshawa, Barnstormer Brewing Company in Barrie, Bellwoods Brewery in Toronto, Left Field Brewery in Toronto, Refined Fool Brewing Co. in Sarnia, Stack Brewing in Sudbury, OutSpoken Brewing in Sault Ste. Marie and Sleeping Giant Brewing in Thunder Bay.

Craft beer sales are increasing in Ontario. In 2015 for example, there was a minimal increase in sales volume for the majors' products while craft beer sales increased by nearly 36 per cent in that year. The provincial government is helping small breweries to expand. For example, in January 2017, it announced a $562,000 funding programme. The recipients included Beau's, Bellwoods, Hockley Valley, Haliburton Highlands, Oast House, Toboggan Brewing, StoneHammer, and Wellington.

=== Prairies ===
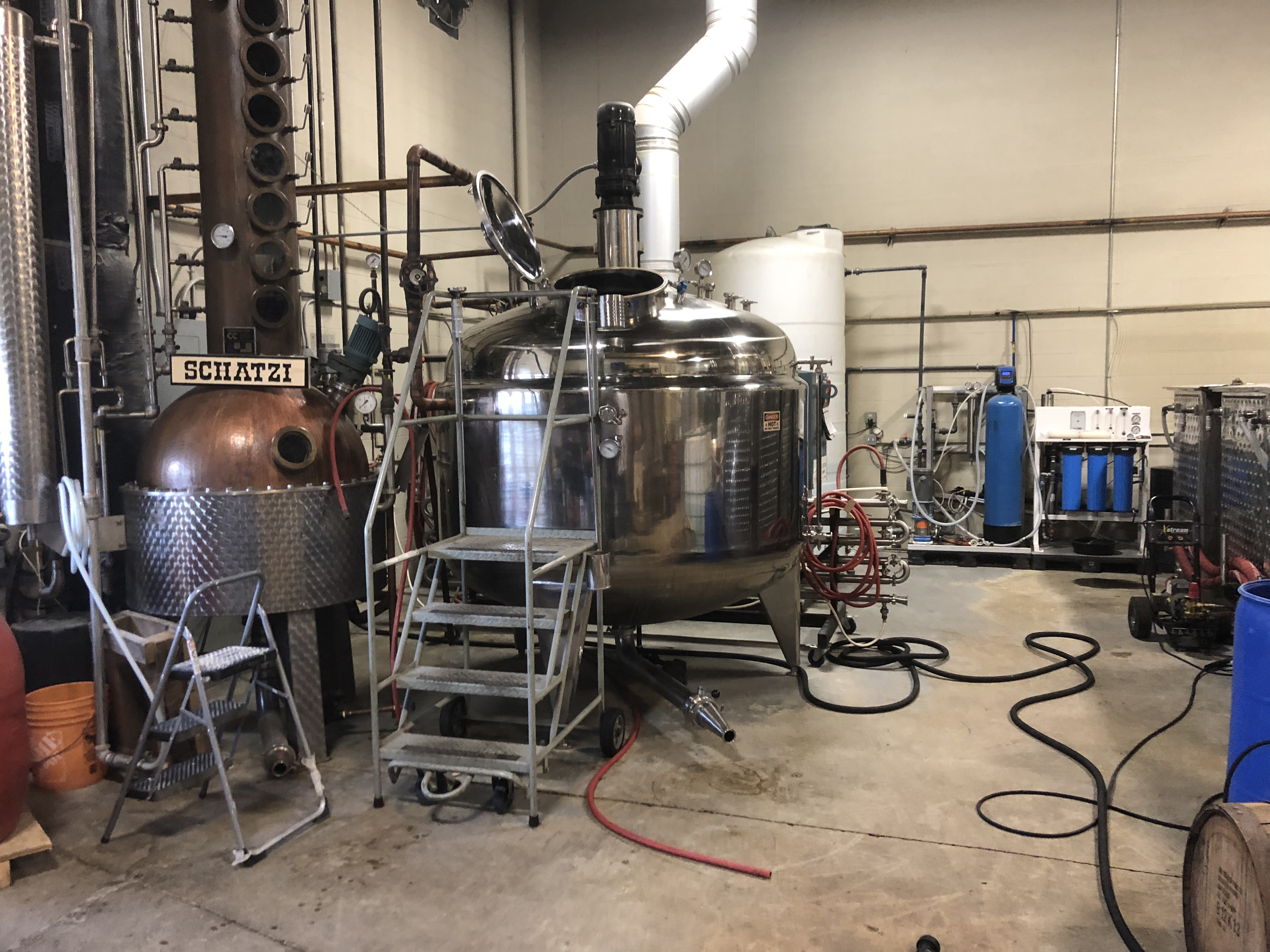
Brewing equipment at Rig Hand Distillery, a brewing company in Nisku, Alberta

Of the Beer Advocate Top 100 Canadian beers, four brews each are made by Half Pints of Winnipeg and Alley Kat of Edmonton, and one by Wild Rose of Calgary. Great Western Brewing Company and Paddock Wood are based in Saskatoon.

Alberta is the only jurisdiction in Canada which has no government involvement in the beer retail, import, and warehousing industries. Alberta has also opened, as of 2013, Olds College Brewery, which hosts the Olds College Brewmaster and Brewery Operations Management course, the second of its kind in Canada. Alberta has been host to several microbreweries, including Big Rock Brewery founded 1985, Alley Kat and Wild Rose Brewery both founded 1996, and a plethora (now over 20) of brewpubs, microbreweries and smaller craft breweries opened since.

Calgary is home to a majority of the breweries in Alberta. It boasts large revenue-generating marketing powerhouses like Big Rock and Minhas Brewery, while also having several mid-sized craft breweries like Tool Shed, Village Brewery, and new, smaller brewers like Last Best (A member of the Bear Hill Brewing Companies), Calgary's only nano-brewery: The Dandy Brewing Company, and the award-winning Establishment Brewing Company. The opening of the Olds College Brewmaster program means that a large number of domestically trained brewers will be added to Canada's brewing industry.

Beer styles commonly brewed in the Prairies include types/styles such as lagers, blondes, pale ales and ambers, IPAs, malt forward beers including porters and stouts as well as many filtered and unfiltered, fruited or standard wheat beers.

=== British Columbia ===
The British Columbia craft beer industry has seen major growth since 2010 when there were 54 small breweries; by 2015 there were 118 such operations. Victoria and Vancouver are the two most dense areas in which breweries can be found with additional breweries opening every year. The over 100 small BC breweries benefitted from a 35% increase in the volume of beer produced in 2016 vs. 2015.

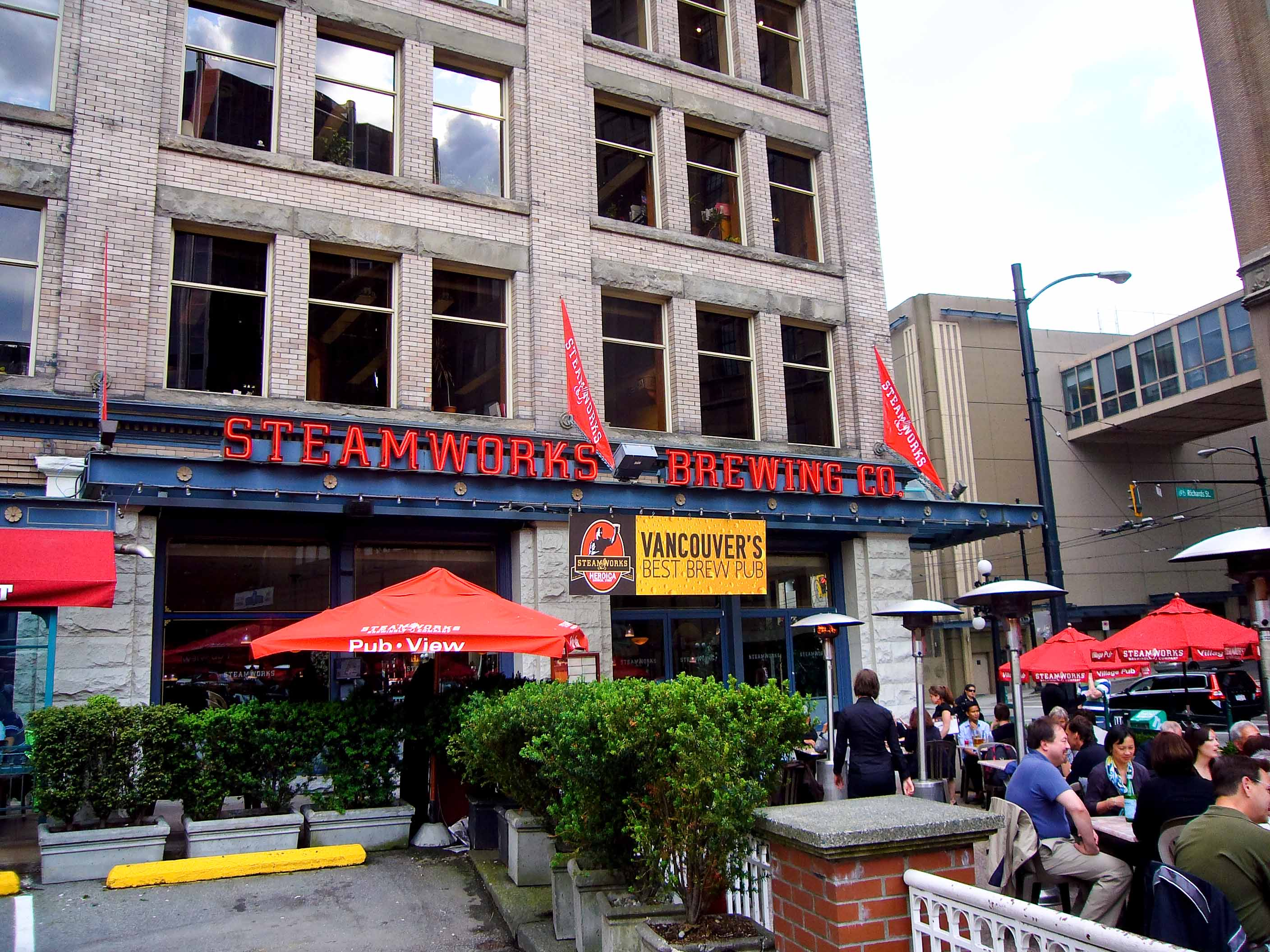
Steamworks Brewing Company brewpub in Vancouver

In 2013 the BC Beer Awards recognized the top craft beer to be produced in the province and adorned top breweries such as Central City, Steamworks, Phillips, Townsite, Fernie, Lighthouse, High Mountain, Yaletown, Coal Harbour and Vancouver Island with gold medals for their beers in a broad range of categories. The rapid growth of the BC Beer industry resembles that of Portland OR more than a decade ago and the rapid growth is helping to spur on local social-economies as well as grow the tourism opportunities around craft beer.

25 of the top 100 beers in Canada are brewed in British Columbia according to Beer Advocate. Driftwood Brewing of Victoria, followed by Central City Brewers & Distillers of Surrey and Phillips Brewing & Malting Co. of Victoria with four each, Howe Sound Brewing of Squamish, and Crannóg Ales of Sorrento, Old Yale Brewing Co. of Chilliwack, Russell Brewing Company of Surrey, Tree Brewing Co. of Kelowna, Lighthouse Brewing Company of Victoria, Spinnaker's Brewpub of Victoria and Parallel 49 Brewing of Vancouver with one apiece.

The Great Canadian Beer Festival has, since 1993 (with help from the Victoria chapter of the Campaign for Real Ale (CAMRA)), focused on cask ales from the Pacific Northwest. Since 2003 the festival has been held at Royal Athletic Park on the first weekend after Labour Day. The festival attracts over 40 craft breweries from across Canada and the Pacific North-western USA and more than 8000 visitors.

In 2010, a group of craft beer enthusiasts started Vancouver Craft Beer Week, the first "beer week"-type festival in Canada, a format that was begun in Philadelphia in 2008. The event has grown significantly since its inception. In 2016, over 100 breweries presented over 350 beers at VCBW, held at the PNE Fairgrounds. The ten-day 2017 event (May 26 to June 4) expects a similar number of breweries, plus four stages with live music and DJs, food trucks, market stalls, brewing demonstrations, a games area and other attractions. The event was the Winner of the 2016 Golden Owl Hospitality Awards Social Event of the Year, the Georgia Straight's 2015 & 2016 Golden Plate Award for Best Beer Festival/Event, and is a six time CAMRA YVR Event of the Year award winner.

== Regulations ==
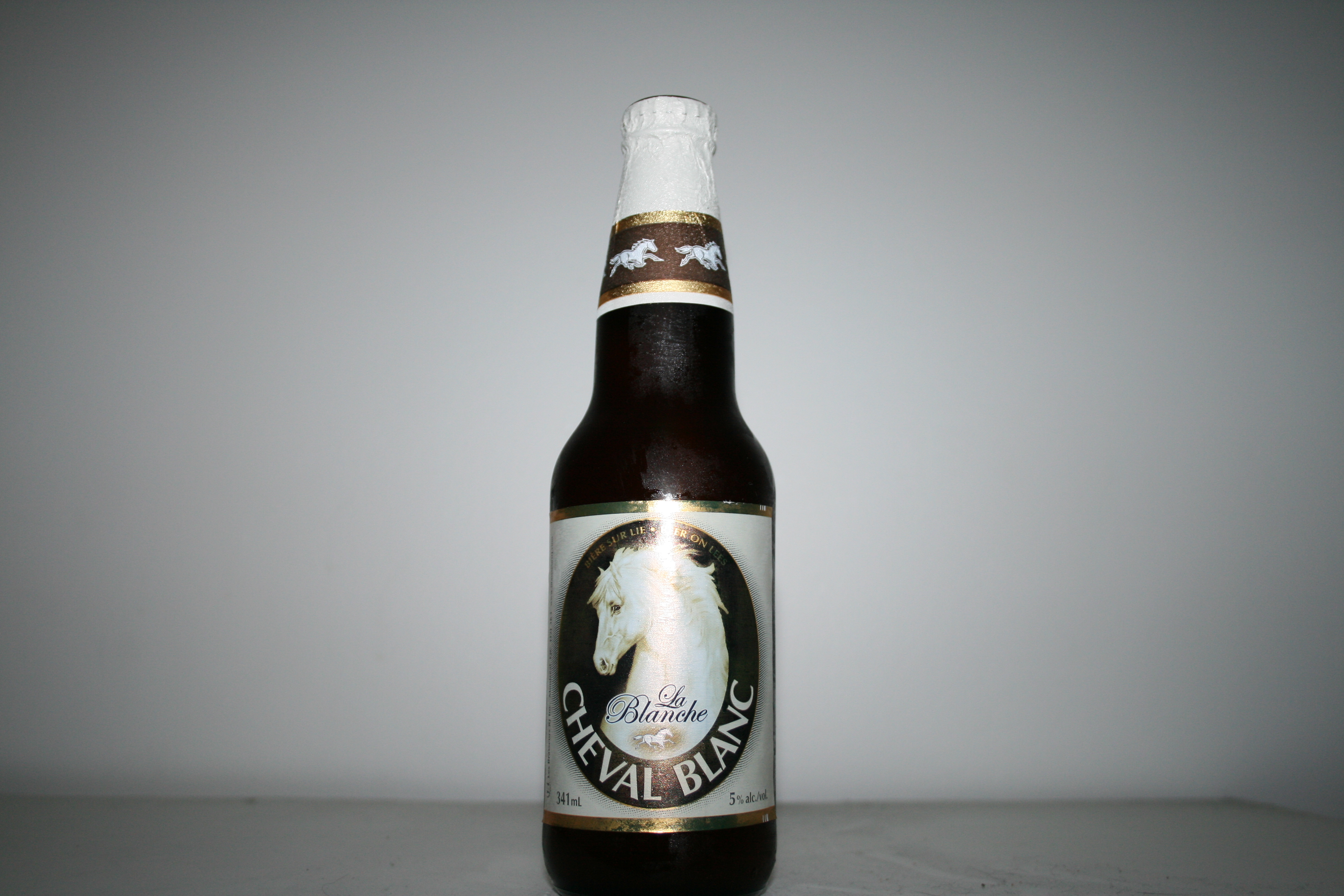
This bottle containing 341 millilitres (3/5 imperial pint) from a Quebec brewery shows 5% ABV, and thus may be labelled simply as "beer".

=== Labelling ===
Beer above 1.1% alcohol by volume (ABV) sold in Canada must show its ABV percent on the label. The Canadian Food Inspection Agency (CFIA) sets other regulations concerning ingredients and origin, though no ingredient list or nutrition facts are required. However potential allergens still must be declared. Beer is labelled with different descriptors determined by alcohol content:

Beer strength labelling in Canada
Alcohol by volume (ABV)	Mandatory name in English	Mandatory name in French
1.1 to 2.5%	Extra light beer	bière extra-légère
2.6 to 4.0%	Light beer	bière légère
4.1 to 5.5%	Beer	bière
5.6 to 8.5%	Strong beer	bière forte
8.6% and higher	Extra strong beer	bière extra-forte

Beer must not have a residual sugar level above 4% by weight. If so, the beverage must be labelled differently as a "malt beverage" or, if it contains juice, "blend of beer and juice".

=== Interprovincial commerce ===
The purchase and transport of beer between provinces is controlled by provincial liquor law. Exemptions under specified amounts are given for personal consumption, but most jurisdictions do not allow the direct importation of other provinces' beer products directly (a similar situation exists for wine and liquor). An agreement was reached in 2018 between the provinces to increase the personal exemption. In 2020, Conservative Member of Parliament Dan Albas put forth a private members bills with the hope of making any Canadian-brewed beers available nationwide.

=== Measuring draft beer ===
Draft beer (or draught beer) served at bars and restaurants in Canada is commonly sold in pints, (Note: In Canadian French, the word pinte historically referred to ¼ gallon, (a 'quart' in English), with the imperial pint instead being called a chopine. However, in contemporary usage pinte refers to the imperial pint as well, even being sanctioned by the Office québécois de la langue française.) defined as the imperial pint: 568 millilitres (20 imperial fluid ounces; 1 1/5 US pints).

The allowable margin of error for a standard pint is between 19¾ and 20½ imperial fluid ounces (or 561.1 ml and 582.4 ml). Although complaints of violation may be made to Measurement Canada, enforcement is rare. In several provinces, draft beer can also be purchased by individuals in kegs. In Ontario, for example, The Beer Store sells kegs to consumers that are 20 litres, 30 litres and 58.6 litres.

== Beer packaging ==
The first consumer packaging for beer in Canada was the growler, a 1.89-litre (0.42 imp gal; 0.50 US gal) bottle sold by local brewpubs. Distribution increased with the bottling lines of large breweries, which sold 650-millilitre (23 imp fl oz; 22 US fl oz) bombers and 750-millilitre (26 imp fl oz; 25 US fl oz) 'quart' bottles. In 1961, the short, squat 341-millilitre (12.0 imp fl oz; 11.5 US fl oz) stubby bottle was introduced and became popular with breweries as it was easier to pack, ship and store with less breakage. Stubbies were used almost exclusively by the major breweries for two decades. Some years later, however, Ontario (like some other provinces) began to allow the sale of "tall boy" cans containing 740 ml of beer.

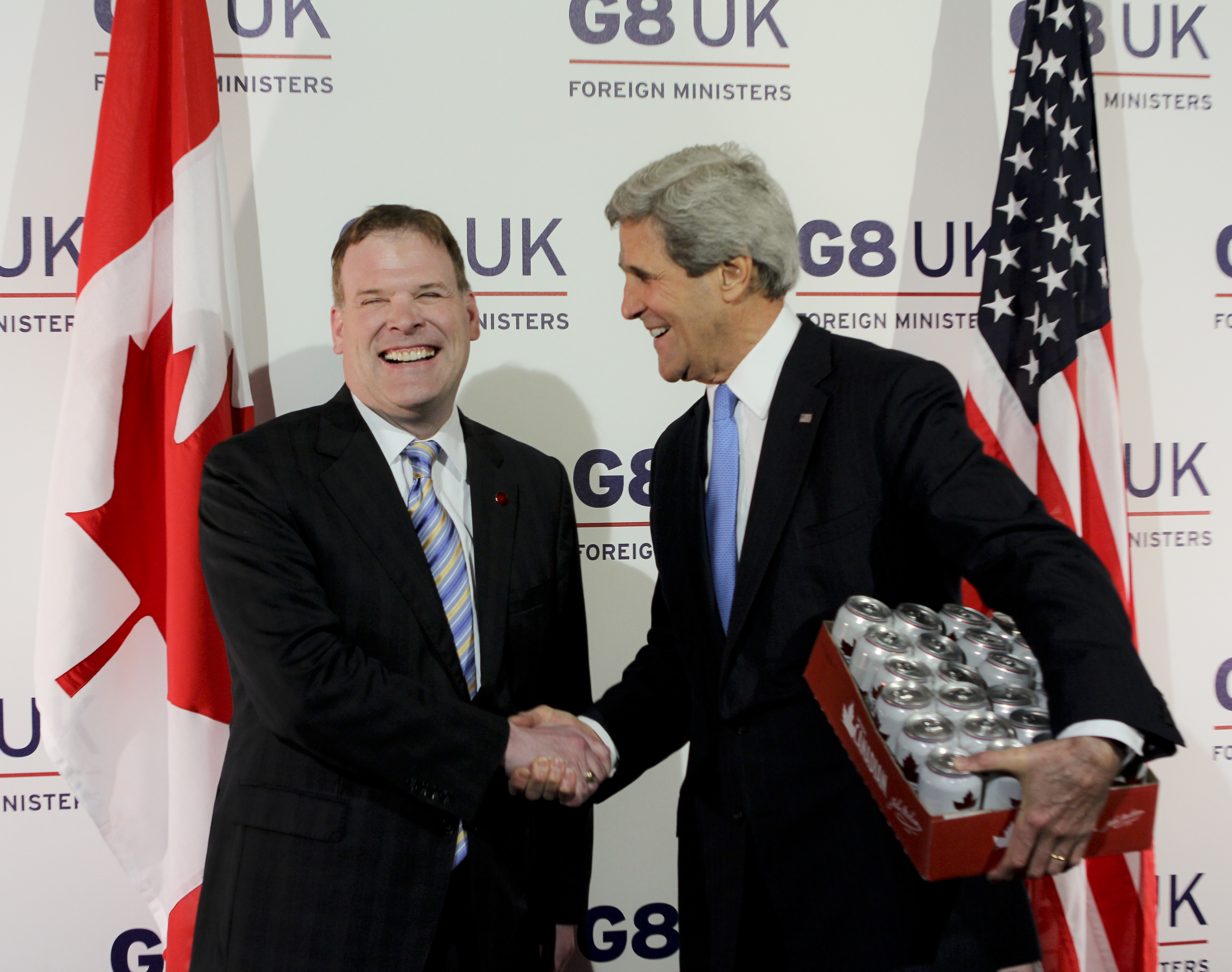
Then-Minister of Foreign Affairs John Baird (left) hands over a case of Molson Canadian beer cans to his American counterpart, then-Secretary of State John Kerry, at a meeting in 2013. Most beers in Canada are sold in cans.

Over 50 per cent of beer in Canada is now sold in cans. Most Canadian craft brewers sell the majority of their beer in cans, often canned by third party mobile canning companies to reduce costs.

Stubbies are a type of bottle which is shorter and with a slightly larger diameter than the now predominant longneck bottle. Starting in 1962 almost all beer in Canada was sold in stubbies (with 341 ml of content) until the beer companies chose to switch to the American-style longneck bottle, between 1982 and 1986. The last major label to be available in the stubby was Labatt's Crystal which switched to the longneck in the summer of 1986. Brick Brewery of Waterloo began selling Red Cap Ale in stubbies as recently as the mid-2000s, although this may no longer be the case. At least a few craft breweries also use this bottle format.

== In media ==
- Under the Influence: Beer is to Canada as wine is to France. How Labatt and its allies brewed up a nation of beer drinkers. Smithsonian Channel. June 30, 2013.

== See also ==
- Beer and breweries by region
- Bob and Doug McKenzie
  - Strange Brew
- List of breweries in Canada
- List of breweries, wineries, and distilleries in Manitoba
- Queen Mary (beer cocktail)
