= Toronto's Festival of Beer =

Annual festival in Toronto, Canada

Toronto Festival of Beer
- Genre: Food, Attractions and entertainment
- Dates: Late July
- Locations: Exhibition Place in Toronto, Ontario
- Years active: 24
- Most recent: July 25-26, 2025
- Attendance: 40,000
- Website: http://www.beerfestival.ca

The Toronto Festival of Beer (TFOB), also known as Beer Fest, is an annual event that takes place at Exhibition Place in Toronto, Ontario, Canada. The festival launched in 1996 and celebrates Canada’s rich brewing history by showcasing beer of all styles, paired with food curated by some of Toronto's popular restaurants and Chefs, in addition to world renowned entertainment on the Bandshell Stage. Today, Toronto's Festival of Beer features more than 400 brands from around the world and many Ontario craft brewers. The event has become Canada’s largest beer festival with 40,000 people attending every year. Beerlicious officially filed for bankruptcy on the morning of April 13, and named MNP Ltd. as the trustee overseeing the case.

== History ==
Toronto's Festival of Beer was founded in 1996 by Greg Cosway and Scott Rondeau. Their love for beer started at Carleton University where they started “The Gourmet Beer Club” which was the first of its kind in Canada. The festival came from those roots and has grown to become an annual celebration of the golden beverage.

In early, 2008, Greg Cosway joined forces with Les Murray, a beer industry veteran. The event has grown into the largest three day beer festival in Canada under the company Beerlicious. In 2017, Greg Cosway sold his interest in the company to pursue other business interests.

The festival was previously held at Fort York in Toronto, but in 2009 due to its growing popularity and expansion, the festival moved to Bandshell Park in Toronto’s Exhibition Place. It has grown from just a small beer festival to now including a variety of internationally recognized musical acts, brand experience areas and also gourmet food offerings.

Toronto's Festival of Beer showcases a wide variety of local craft brewers from the province on Ontario, in addition to national and international brewers. The festival also showcases a World of Beer pavilion which is focused on a different destination each year. Some previous nations that have been showcased at the festival in the past include: Ireland, Sweden, Canada, US and many more. From craft beer to local chefs and food purveyors, to international musical artists, the festival has something for everyone.

== Beer sampling ==
During the event, over 100 different exhibits showcase over 400 different styles and brands of beer. The styles of beer range from locally crafted beer to international offerings from various parts of the globe. Toronto's Festival of Beer is also known for hosting a feature pavilion each year that is dedicated to a specific destination. In the past, the festival featured Ireland, Sweden, and Canada. Details for the 2020 festival can be found at www.beerfestival.ca

Sample List of Beers
Molson Canadian; Budweiser; Bud Lite; Bud Lite Lime; Harp Lager; Smithwicks Ale; F&M Brewery; Wellington Brewery; Railway City Brewing Company	Miller Chill; Molson M; Shock Top; Alexander Keith's; Newcastle Brown Ale; McClelland Imports; Great Lakes Brewery; Black Oak Brewery; Amsterdam Brewery	All or Nothing Hopfenweisse; Moosehead; Red Stripe Lager; Strongbow Cider; Guinness Draught; Niagara College Teaching Brewery; Banks Caribbean Lager; Beer Barons; Mill Street	Ozawa Canada; Big Rock Brewery; 3 Brewers; United Distributors; Tsing Tao; Nickel Brook; Old Credit Brewery; Lake of Bays Brewing Company; Beau's All Natural Brewing Company	Innis & Gunn; Minhas Craft Brewery; Creemore Springs; Rickards; Cameron's Brewing; Flying Monkey's Brewery; Cool Beer Brewing; McLays Pale Ale; Brick Brewing Company

== Additional services ==
The Toronto Festival of Beer also offers food and refreshment services to paying patrons. These services vary from drinks, to classic BBQ, and even exotic food.

The services offered by the Toronto Festival of Beer include:

- South St. Burger Co.
- Pizza Pizza
- Caplansky's
- The Dawgfather
- Tiny Tom's Donuts
- Ontario Corn Roasters
- Grandpa Ken's Back Bacon
- Heavenly Dreams Ice Cream
- The Real Jerk
- La Poutine Machine
- The Friendly Greek
- Edo Sushi
- Oyster Boy
- Shanghai Cowgirl
- Mac n' Cheese booth

The Toronto Festival of Beer also hosts entertainment groups as well as radio stations such as 99.9 Virgin Radio and various other music bands and groups.

== Environmental awareness ==
The Toronto Festival of Beer has always had a large gathering of people at their events, however they also want to become part of an act to help the environment. The Toronto Festival of Beer acknowledges the impact that a large event like the festival would have on the environment. The Toronto Festival of Beer has newly introduced reusable plastic sampling tokens, and recyclable paper cups. With this change to the Toronto Festival of Beer's layout there has been a great reduction in the number of disposable tokens and disposable paper cups. The management team of the Toronto Festival of Beer has also put a beer bottle drive into effect which will allow for more beer bottles to be recycled rather than thrown away. These actions that Toronto Festival of Beer are doing will cut back dramatically the environmental impact and cut clean-up expenses.

== Attractions ==
There are many activities planned for the Toronto's Festival of Beer. Audiences will be entertained through the various musical talents that will be performing live on the Planter's main stage. There is a grilling tent hosted by professional chefs for those who are interested in gaining grilling tips.

The Libation Nation hosts events that happen in the festival every year. This year the Girl's Guided Beer Tour event will lead women throughout the festival educating them on the history of beer and women in the industry.
