= Muskoka Cottage Brewery =

Microbrewery in Ontario, Canada

Muskoka Brewery
- Industry: Alcoholic drink
- Founded: June 1996
- Founders: Gary McMullen and Kirk Evans
- Headquarters: Bracebridge, Ontario, Canada
- Key people: Todd Lewin, President
- Products: Beer
- Owner: Muskoka Brewery Inc.
- Website: www.muskokabrewery.com

Muskoka Brewery (formerly Muskoka Cottage Brewery) is a microbrewery founded in June 1996 as a part-time operation by Gary McMullen and Kirk Evans. By 2016, it had increased to 130 employees in a facility that is over 70,000 sq ft (6,500 m^{2}) in size.

The company manufactures a line of beers, including Cream Ale, Mad Tom IPA, Dark, Craft Lager, Ebb & Flow, Detour and Shinnicked Stout. The products are sold at the brewery at 1964 Muskoka Beach Road, Bracebridge, Ontario, at select pubs and restaurants (in Ontario, Manitoba, Alberta and Nova Scotia), and at The Beer Store and LCBO outlets. According to Gary McMullen, "They’re almost entirely unfiltered ... made with natural ingredients, no preservatives and handcrafted to final perfection."

The products have won many awards, most recently (2016) from The World Beer Championships, the Canadian Brewing Awards, and the US Open Beer Championship. In early 2017, Muskoka Brewery was named one of Canada's 10 Most Admired Corporate Cultures of 2016 by Waterstone Human Capital. Muskoka Brewery is a member of the Ontario Craft Brewers Association.

== See also ==
- Beer in Canada
