= F&M Brewery =

Former brewery in Guelph, Ontario, Canada

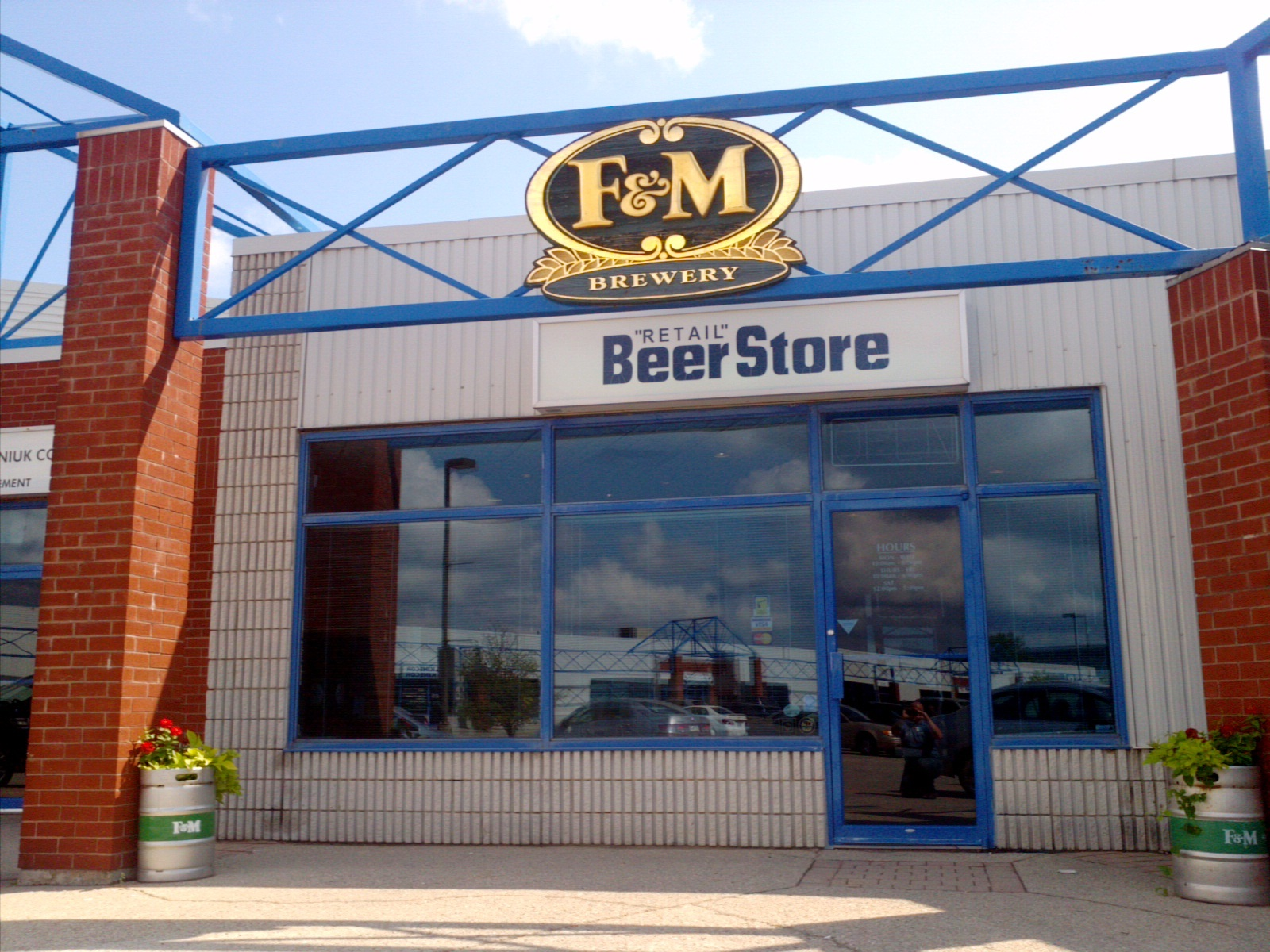
StoneHammer Brewing

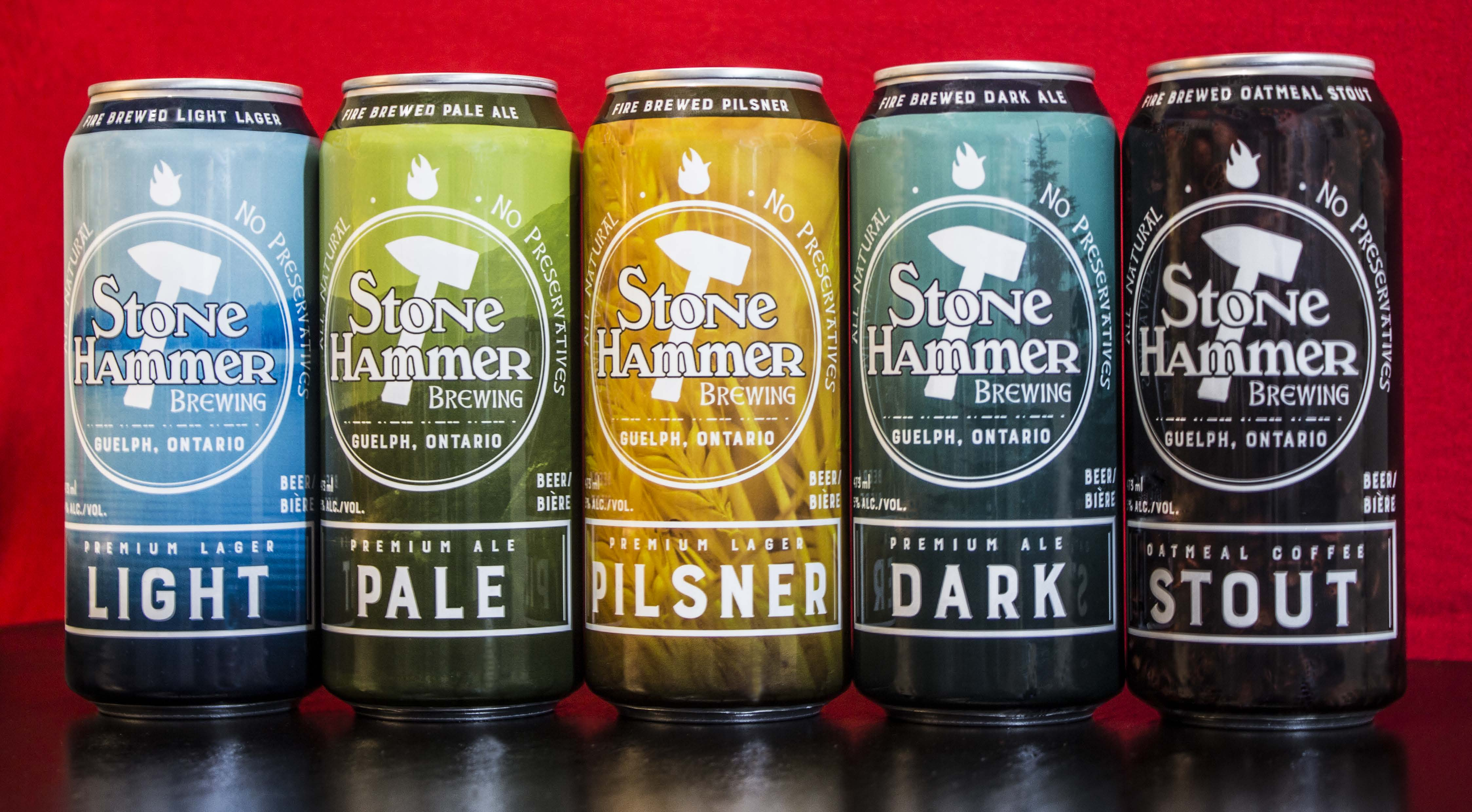

StoneHammer Brewing was located in Guelph, Ontario and was a member of the Ontario Craft Brewers Association (OCB). The brewery was established in August 1995 as F&M Breweries by Rich Fortnum, Bruce Fortnum, Antonia Smits and Charles MacLean. They produced StoneHammer Pilsner, MacLean's Pale Ale, and a dry-hopped dark mild sold only in casks to select publicans. During this time, F&M started contract brewing in Ontario for a handful of contracts while under contention under LCBO licensing. Their StoneHammer Pilsner was also invited into the Great British Beer Festival beer competition, into the American jurisdiction. Three years later it was sold to Frank Cerniuk who continued the Stone Hammer (sic) name with an award-winning line of Stone Hammer beers under the company name F&M Brewery. In February 2015, Frank sold the Brewery to Phillip and Lesley Woodhouse who renamed the brewery after its flagship brand. In spring 2018, the company filed for bankruptcy having closed its doors in late April of that year. StoneHammer also produced several contract beers, including the Taste of Ontario Harvest Series for the Neighbourhood Group.

StoneHammer beer was fire-brewed in small batches with natural ingredients. Maple syrup used in the Maple Red Ale was locally sourced from Shady Grove Maple in Guelph, while the coffee used in their Oatmeal Coffee Stout was supplied from Guelph coffee roasters Planet Bean.

== F&M and Stone Hammer Beers ==
- StoneHammer Pilsner
- MacLean's Pale Ale
- <unnamed> Dry-Hopped Dark Mild
- Dark Ale
- Session Lager
- Oatmeal Coffee Stout
- Pale Ale
- Maple Red Ale (April–June)
- Baltic Porter

== Contract Beers ==
- Taylor & Bates Elora Pale Ale
- Harvest Lager
- Harvest Ale

== See also ==
- Beer in Canada
- List of breweries in Canada
