= Hemp beer =

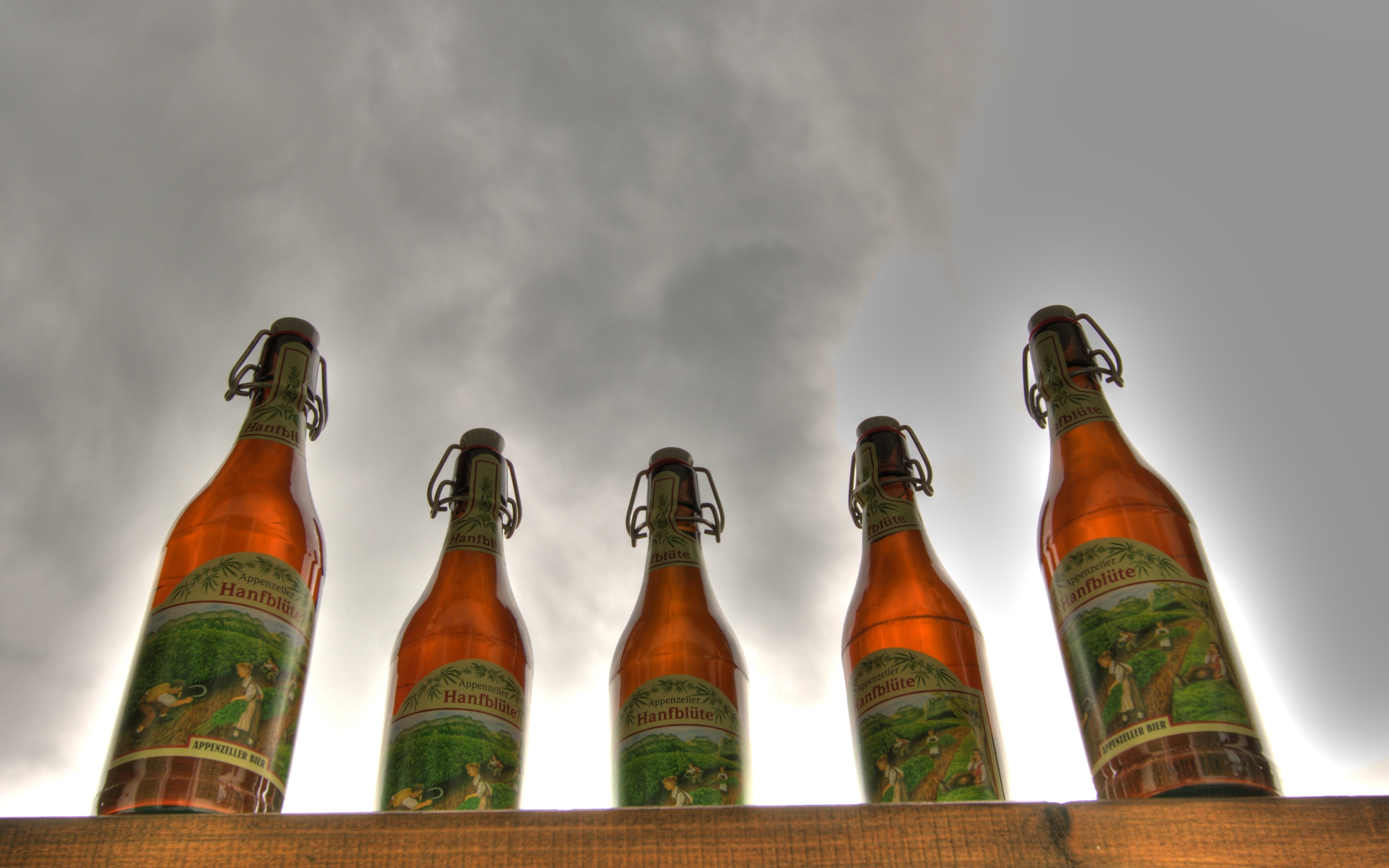
Swiss hemp beer Appenzeller Hanfblüte

Hemp beer (German: Hanfbier) is a form of beer infused with elements of the cannabis plant. Hemp beer is not brewed from hemp directly, but hemp products such as seeds are a later flavoring addition.

American breweries producing hemp beer include the Humboldt Brewing Company and Limestone Brewing Company. Canadian microbrewery Cool Beer Brewing Company produces Millennium Buzz Hemp Beer.

== Beermaking ==
Hemp beer is unique in that its namesake derives from the addition of hemp to flavor beer. Breweries follow a basic guide of water, hops, barley or malt, and yeast in their own brews, which is based on then current German beer purity laws. Due to their close relationship as plants, the addition of hemp to hops based beers will maintain a complementing, but not identical flavor. Most, but not all hemp beers are hopped and then at some point in the process, hemped. Typically, a brew is hemped after the boiling process and then allowed to sit for several weeks to allow the yeast to ferment and the hemp to become infused.

=== Hemp as an additive ===
In the United States, hemp is defined under the 2018 United States farm bill as not having more than 0.3 percent THC. The low 0.3 percent dosage of THC is not enough to be psychoactive, whereas any cannabis plant with a greater dosage would be considered schedule 1 and potent. Breweries in the United States are currently experimenting with adding hemp to their own brews. Generally, the beer is brewed and then a body or piece of hemp is added in the final stages to give the brew an infused tastes and aroma. Due to the robustness and usability of the plant, several parts of hemp can be used as an additive during the brewing process in order to bring hemp flavor and aroma.

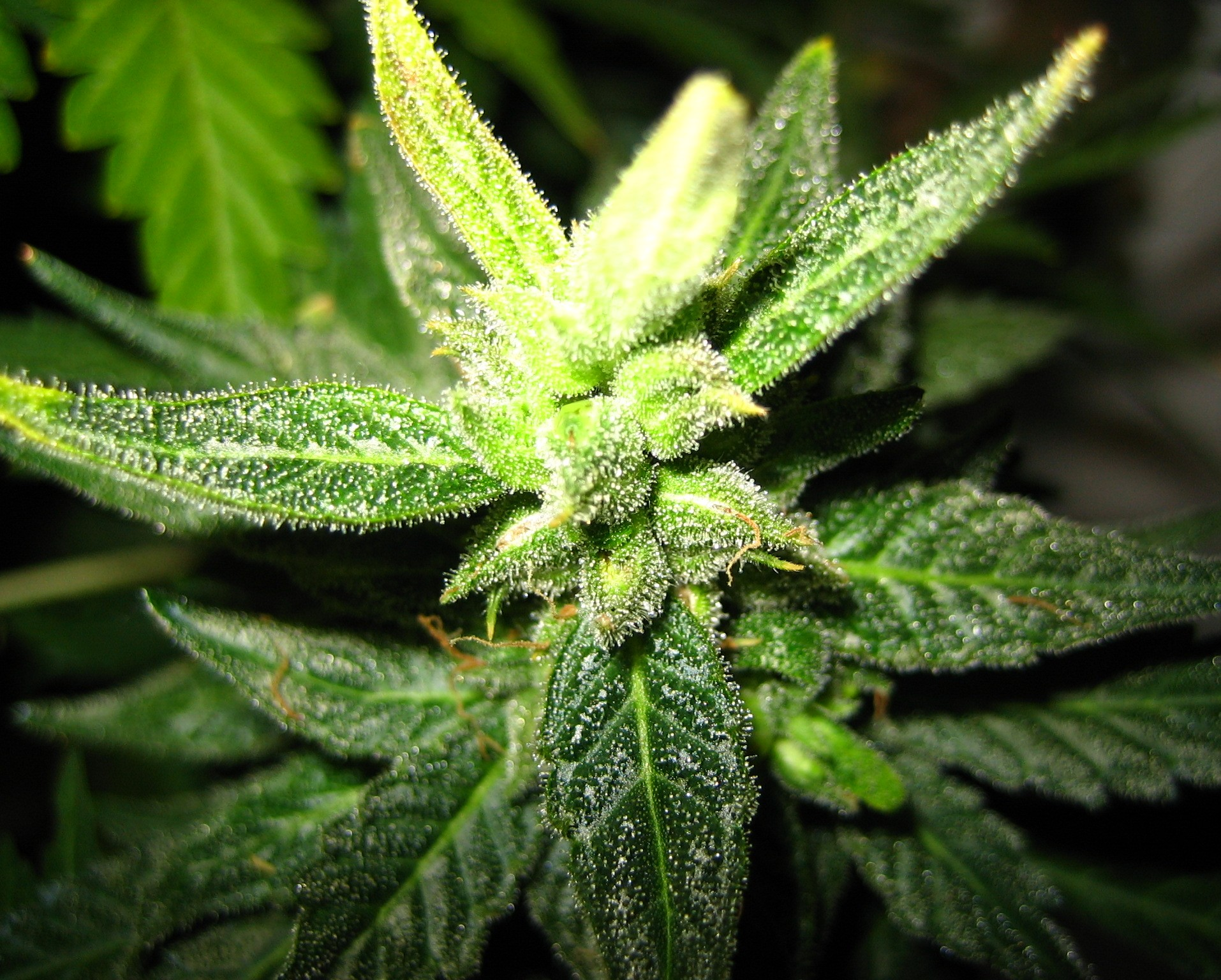
- Virtually all parts of the hemp flower can be broken down and repurposed
  Hemp flower: generally the most complete form of hemp as an additive
- Hemp leaf: hemp leaves only
- Hemp extract: the hemp-derived extract known as CBD or cannabidiol is mixed into the finished beer or brew
- Hemp seed oil: similar to extract, essential hemp oil is added to the finished beer or post brew
- Hemp hearts: the meat of the seed, minus the shell
- Hemp fibers: beer is passed through a filter made of hemp strands

=== United States breweries ===
Since marijuana is illegal federally, not every brewery is able to manufacture and distribute their own hemp beer. New Belgium brewery from Colorado was one of the first breweries to experiment with different forms of hemp, before producing a legal beverage. Larger beer producers such as Blue Moon, Constellation Brands, and Molson Coors, are preparing to release their own brews in response to New Belgium's positive reception. Lagunitas Brewing based in California have released a hemp and THC-infused beverage, that is only legal in its home state. As manufactures begin to experiment with the potential market, hemp will likely remain at the forefront followed by more CBD-infused beverages. Sweetwater Brewing Company in Atlanta, Georgia have already found success in a hemp infused and cannabis tasting beer without any psychedelic properties. More craft breweries and larger producers are more likely to develop their own products as the market becomes more demanding and legislation more relaxed.

=== Legal restrictions ===
Federally, the United States still classifies cannabis as a controlled substance. Although some states have legalized the use of marijuana and hemp for business, personal, and recreational use, the federal restrictions creates a legal grey area. However, with the ratification of the 2018 Farm Bill, breweries and businesses are able to import, grown, and use hemp throughout their manufacturing process. The bill "puts no restrictions on the sale, transport, or possession of hemp-derived products, so long as those items are produced in a manner consistent with the law". Beers created using hemp or parts of it, have gone on to receive FDA approval. Brewers are unable to claim that their hemp infused products have any health effects without first being approved by the FDA. The administration is particular in what it approves, and beer that may have a pain relieving or psychedelic affect falls beyond the 0.3 percent limit of legal hemp. Beer producers may also choose to advertise their beer as being hemp infused, without any side effects in order to sidestep FDA approval.

=== Flavors and aromas ===
The flavor profile of hemp can vary, but the aroma is generally that of the cannabis variety. Depending on the brewer, what part of hemp used, preexisting or other added flavors, and how long the additives are allowed to infuse are variables that can impact the result. Hemp beers have been described as having an "herbal flavor," "caramel" tastes, and a"stickily sweet and lightly bitter finish."
