= Hale's Ales =

Brewery in Seattle, Washington

Coordinates: 47.659119°N 122.365182°W

- Type: Brewery
- Location: Seattle, Washington, USA
- Opened: 1983
- Closed: 2022
- Key people: Mike Hale

Hale's Ales was a brewery in Seattle, Washington, USA, founded in 1983.

== History ==
It was founded by Mike Hale in 1983. The first batch was brewed in a Colville, Washington apartment before the brewery opened in a local warehouse. Its second brewery opened four years later in Kirkland, Washington. The Colville brewery moved to Spokane, Washington, in 1992, and the Kirkland brewery to Seattle's Ballard neighborhood in 1995. The Ballard location was a 30-barrel brewpub.

== Brews ==
The Hale's Ales brewing process followed a traditional English style, utilizing open fermentation tanks with top-fermenting ale yeast. Most recipes called for a proprietary English yeast strain, however Belgian strains have been used in some seasonal recipes. Hale's Ales had also begun experimenting with bourbon barrel-aging certain recipes including the Wee Heavy Winter Ale, Troll Porter, as well as Supergoose IPA.

=== Brewed Year Round ===
- Pale American Ale
- Kölsch German Style Ale
- Mongoose IPA
- Red Menace Big Amber
- El Jefe Weizen
- Cream Ale
- Cream H.S.B (Hale's Special Bitter)
- Troll Porter
- Nightroll Porter
- Supergoose IPA

=== Brewed Seasonally ===
- Wee Heavy Winter Ale
- Irish Style Nut Brown Ale
- O'Brian's Harvest Ale
- Rudyard's Rare Barley Wine
- Aftermath Imperial I.P.A.
- Pikop Andropov's Rushin' Imperial Stout
- Belgian Dubbel 25th Anniversary Ale

== The Palladium ==
What was once a brewery warehouse is now a versatile space which is home to the theatrical Moisture Festival production, weddings, company parties, dance, cabaret, and other events. This large space is equipped with stage lighting, sound equipment, concession stand, a green room, and atmosphere galore.
