= Cream ale =

Style of American beer

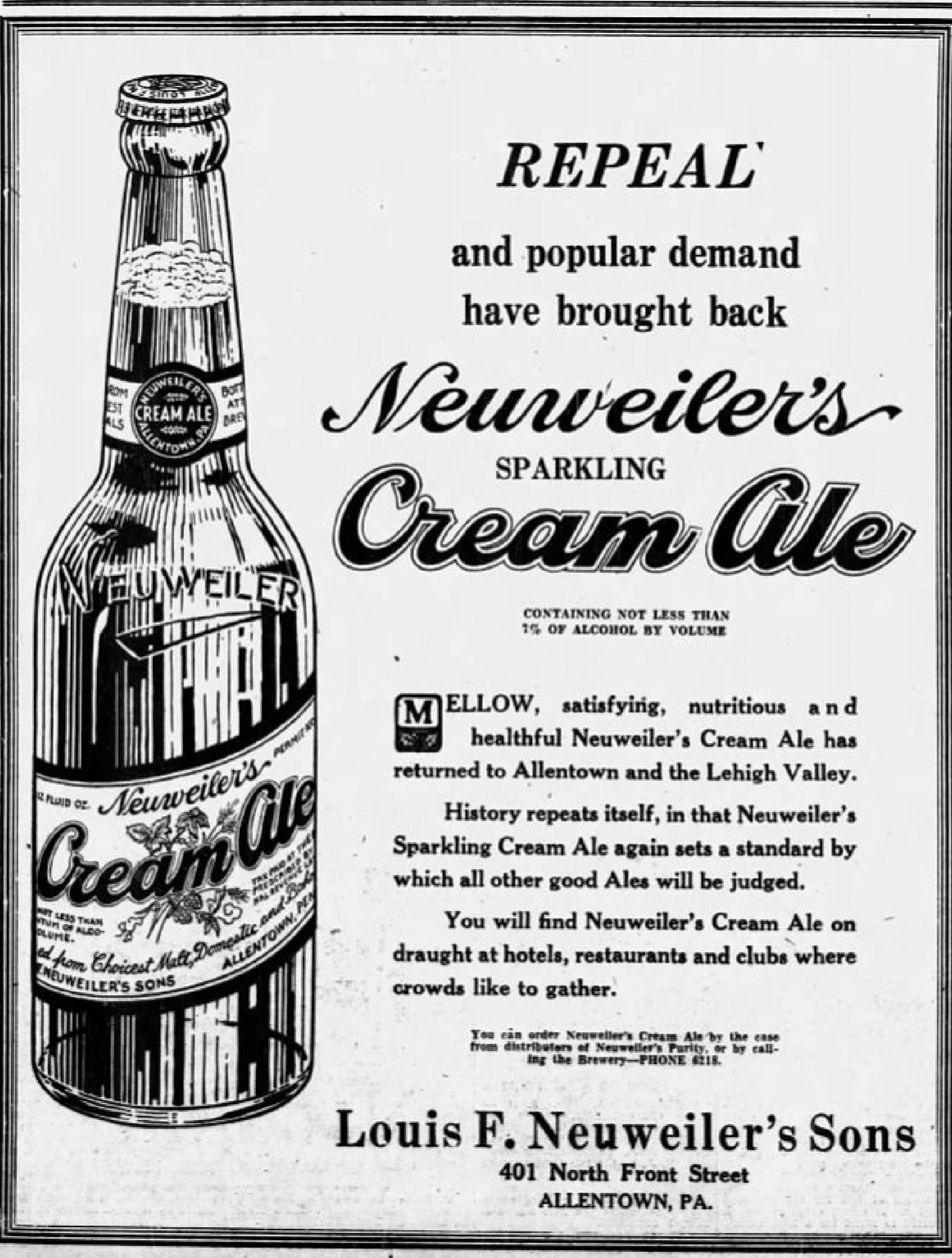
- Country of origin: United States
- Yeast type: Top-fermenting; Bottom-fermenting
- Alcohol by volume: 4.2–5.6%
- Color (SRM): 2.5–5
- Bitterness (IBU): 8–20
- Original gravity: 1.042–1.055
- Final gravity: 1.006–1.012
- Malt percentage: 60–100%

Cream ale is a style of American beer that is light in color and well attenuated, meaning drier. First crafted in the mid-1800s at various breweries in the United States, cream ale remained a very localized form with different styles until the early 20th century. During Prohibition in the United States, a great number of Canadian brewers began brewing cream ale, refining it to some degree. Following the end of Prohibition, cream ale from Canada sold well in the United States, reigniting the popularity of the beer.

== Style ==
Cream ale is related to pale lager. They are generally brewed to be light and refreshing with a straw to pale golden color. Hop and malt flavor is usually subdued, but like all beer styles, it is open to individual interpretation, so some breweries give them a more assertive character. Despite the name, cream ales do not contain any dairy products.

While cream ales are top-fermented ales, they typically undergo an extended period of cold-conditioning or lagering after primary fermentation is complete. This reduces fruity esters and gives the beer a cleaner flavor. Some examples also have a lager yeast added for the cold-conditioning stage or are mixtures of ales and lagers. Adjuncts such as corn and rice are used to lighten the body and flavor, although all-malt examples are available from many craft brewers.

== Examples ==
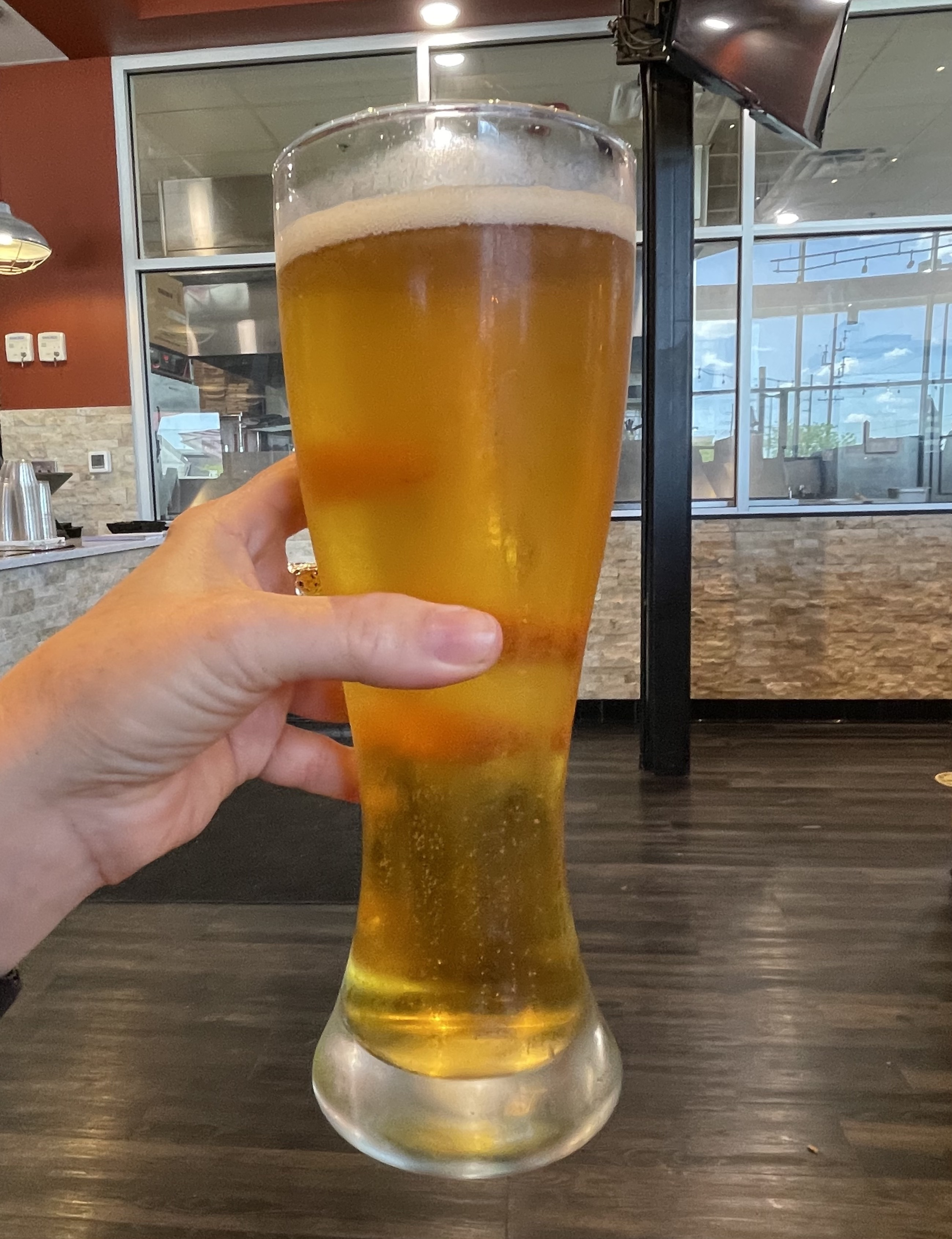
- Sun King Brewing Cream Ale
  A Frame Cream Ale (A Frame Brewing, Squamish, BC)
- All or Nothing Think Big'Ger Cream Ale (All or Nothing Brewhouse, Oshawa, Ontario)
- Birdy Cream (Strangebird, Rochester, New York)
- Buckle Bunny Cream Ale (Eureka Heights Brew Co, Houston, Texas)
- Castle Cream Ale (Castle Danger Brewing Company, Two Harbors, Minnesota)
- Coastie Cream Ale (St. Michael's Brewing Company, Navarre, Florida)
- Creole Cream Ale (Abita Brewing Company, Abita Springs, Louisiana)
- Croydon Cream Ale (Neshaminy Creek Brewing Company)
- Genesee Cream Ale (Genesee Brewing Company, Rochester, New York)
- Grindhouse Cream Ale (Ghost River Brewing Co., Memphis, Tennessee)
- Hale's Cream Ale (Hale's Ales)
- Katie's Cream Ale (Great Basin Brewing Company)
- Kiwanda Pre-Prohibition Cream Ale (Pelican Brewery, Pacific City, Oregon)
- Muskoka Cream Ale (Muskoka Cottage Brewery)
- Newburgh Cream Ale (Newburgh Brewing Company)
- Post Road Detour (Lost Shoe Brewing & Roasting Company, Marlborough, Massachusetts)
- Premium Cream Ale, (18th Ward Brewing, Brooklyn, New York)
- Retro Styles Pre-Prohibition Cream Ale (Analog Brewing Company, Edmonton, Alberta)
- Riser Cream Ale (Good Measure Brewing, Northfield, Vermont)
- Schoenling Little Kings (Schoenling Brewing Company)
- Scoop Dog (Wise Man Brewing, Winston-Salem, North Carolina)
- Session Cream Ale (Full Sail Brewing Company)
- Sleeman Cream Ale (Sleeman Breweries)
- Sunlight Cream Ale (Sun King Brewing)
- Unicorn Milk (Twenty Six Acres Brewing, Concord, North Carolina)
- Bearded Prospector Pre-Prohibition Cream Ale (Full Beard Brewing Company, Timmins, Ontario)

== See also ==
- Beer style
- Draught beer
- Kolsch
- Irish cream ale
  - Kilkenny (beer)
