= Louis Prud'homme =

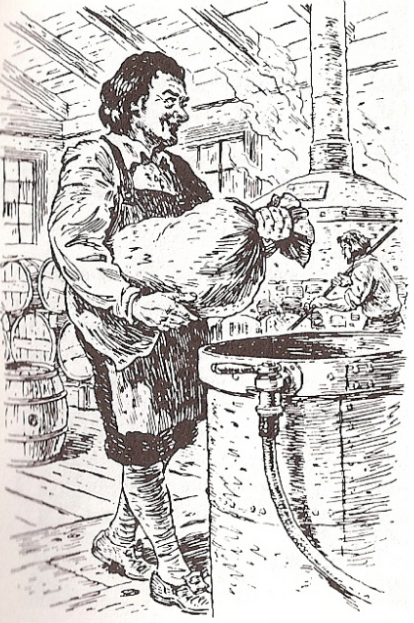
- Born: 1611; Pomponne, France
- Died: 1 July 1671 (aged 60); Montreal
- Citizenship: France
- Occupation: Brewer
- Spouse: Roberte Gadois (1621–1716)
- Parent(s): Claude Prud’homme and Isabelle Aliomet

Louis Prud'homme (1611–1671) is remembered both as the first militia captain of Montreal and the founder of the first commercial brewery in New France in 1650.

== Establishment in Ville-Marie ==
Prud'homme was one of the original settlers in Fort Ville-Marie (now Montreal), arriving in 1641 in the mission led by Paul de Chomedey de Maisonneuve, receiving thirty acres of land outside the fort in October 1650. In November 1650 Prud’homme married Roberte Gadoys (1621–1716), daughter of Pierre Gadoys, recognized as the first farmer of Montreal. Also in 1650 Prud'homme established the first commercial brewery in New France, located outside the fortification of Fort Ville-Marie. The brewery survived, in a wood building, survived multiple attempts by the Iroquois to burn it down. Prud'homme received further grants of land in 1654, 1662, and 1666.

== Involvement in Civic Affairs ==
Prud'homme's original land grant adjoined that of Michel Chauvin, just outside the fort. Earlier in 1650, Prud'homme discovered on a trip to France that Chauvin was a bigamist, having married Louise Delisle on 10 August 1637 in Ste-Suzanne, Mayenne, France and subsequently Anne Archambault, daughter of Jacques Archambault, on 27 July 1647 in Paroisse Notre Dame, Québec, a celebration Prud'homme had attended. Prud'homme informed Governor Chomedy of this fact, which led to Chauvin's banishment from Ville-Marie and the annulment of his marriage to Anne Archambault.

In 1657, priests from the Society of Saint-Sulpice - known as "the Sulpicians", took over in Ville-Marie from the Jesuits. Prud’homme was elected as one of the first three churchwardens of the parish of Notre-Dame. In 1663, he is recorded as a corporal of a section in the newly constituted militia of the Holy Family. In 1664 he and four other colonists were elected as police magistrates, but the authorities of New France refused to confirm the results of the election as they viewed the police court as too democratic.

== Family ==
Prud'homme had seven children;

- Francois-Xavier Prud'homme (1652–1741);
- Paul Prud'homme (1654–1681);
- Marguerite Prud'homme (1656–1725);
- Pierre Prud'homme (1658–1703);
- Catherine Prud'homme (1661–1736);
- Elisabeth Prud'homme (1663–1744);
- Jeanne Prud'homme (1667–?);.

== See also ==
- History of Montreal
- Beer in Canada
