= Wellington Brewery =

Brewery in Guelph, Ontario, Canada

Coordinates: 43.5333°N 80.3205°W

- Type: Privately held company
- Industry: Brewing
- Founded: Guelph, Ontario, Canada (1985; 41 years ago)
- Founder: Phil Gosling
- Headquarters: Guelph, Canada
- Area served: Canada
- Owner: Mike Stirrup, Doug Dawkins (2000 - )
- Number of employees: 45 (2016)
- Website: wellingtonbrewery.ca

Wellington Brewery is a brewery in Guelph, Ontario, Canada. It was established in 1985 and was one of the first North American breweries to revive the ancient technique of brewing cask-conditioned cask ale. Phil Gosling was the founder. By 2011, the volume of sales required the company to expand its brewing capacity. Two new 150HL tanks were installed. In January 2013, four more tanks were installed to keep up with demand for Wellington products. In 2015, the company's facility was expanded with a 12,000-square-foot addition, including a 40-hectolitre brew house and new packaging line. At that time, the company employed a staff of 45. The company also has a distribution warehouse in Toronto.

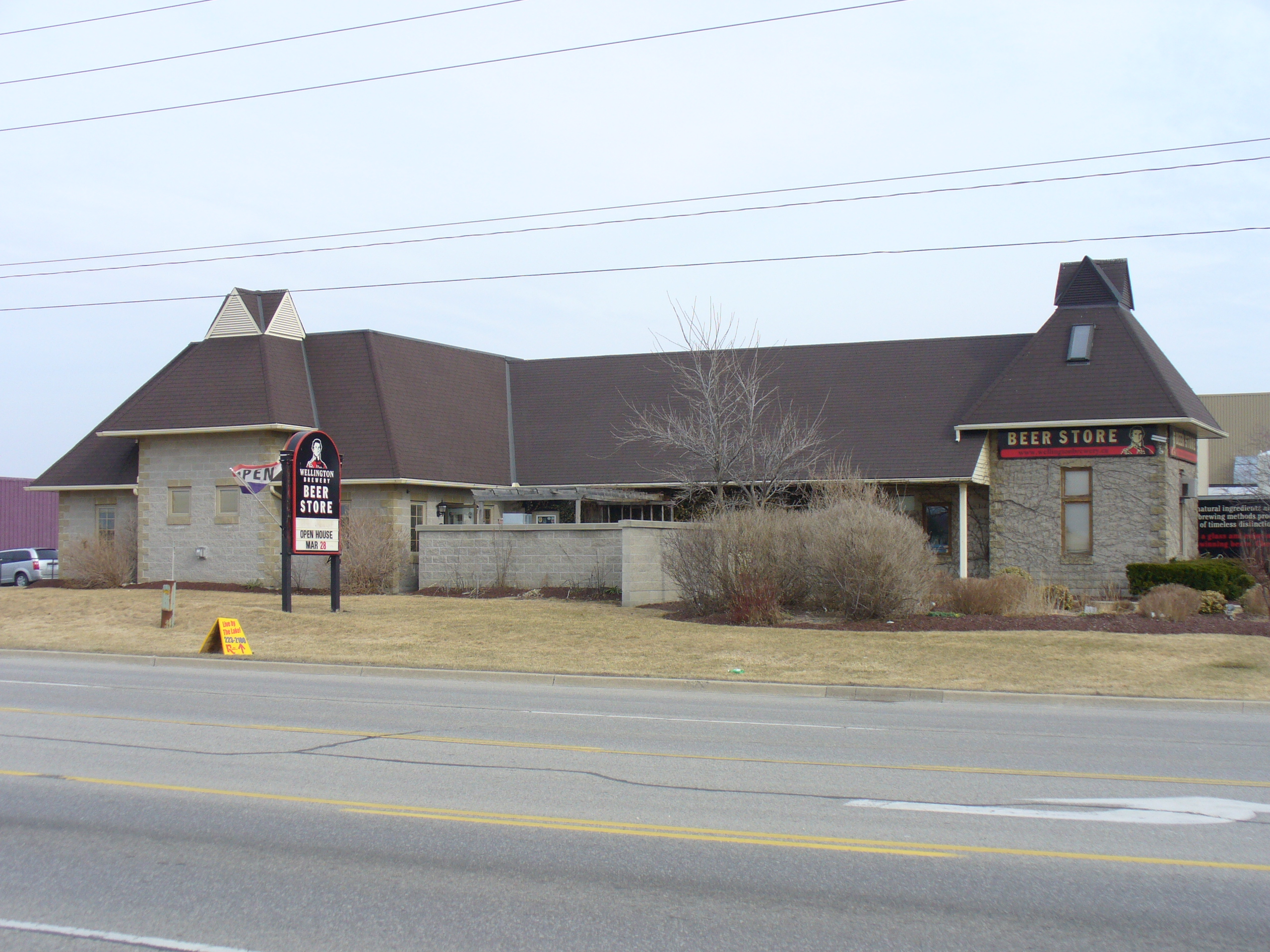
Wellington Brewery in Guelph, Ontario

In 2000, new owners acquired the company: Mike Stirrup and Doug Dawkins. Unlike many small breweries making Beer in Canada, Wellington has not been acquired by a major brewer; hence, the company now bills itself as Canada's oldest independently owned craft brewery, despite being predated by B.C.'s Spinnakers Brewpub and Vancouver Island Brewing (both founded in 1984). Traditionally, this craft beer was sold in bottles, but recently, the company has increased the use of cans to meet the growing public demand for this type of beer container.

The Wellington beers are brewed in small batches with natural ingredients and use no cold filtration, natural carbonation, no pasteurization, and secondary fermentation in casks. The brewery's architecture is an homage to the traditional Oast house, the farm building used for drying hops in preparation for the brewing process

Over the years the company has won numerous awards for its products, at events such as the Canadian Brewing Awards, the Ontario Brewing Awards and the U.S. Open Beer Championship. In the 2016 Ontario Brewing Awards, for example, Wellington's Imperial Russian Stout earned a gold medal, County Dark Ale received a gold medal, Iron Duke won a bronze, and Arkell Best Bitter earned a silver. In the small-batch category (brewed in collaboration with another company), Wellington gained awards for the Welly One-Off Series, A Spice Odyssey and Farmers' Market Rhubarb Saison.

In the 2019 Canadian Brewing Awards, Wellington received three Silver awards: for Helles Lager, Arkell Best Bitter and Faces Double IPA.

== Beers Offered ==
Some of the following are seasonal, or brewed only occasionally.

- Upside IPA
- Helles Lager
- Special Pale Ale
- Kickin' Back Dry Hopped Session Ale
- County Brown Ale
- Imperial Russian Stout
- Arkell Best Bitter
- Terrestrial India Brown Ale
- Iron Duke Strong Ale
- Chocolate Milk Stout
- Farmers' Market Rhubarb Saison

== See also ==
- List of breweries in Canada
