= Ian Coutts (writer) =

Canadian author and editor

Ian Coutts is a Canadian author and editor whose work has been published in numerous markets and recognized with several honors and awards. Special areas of interest include military history, ocean liners and brewing.

His most recent book, Obsessions: Craft Beer, will appear in spring 2016. His previous book, The Perfect Keg: Sowing, Scything, Malting and Brewing My Way to the Best-Ever Pint of Beer, was published in 2014 by Greystone Books. His first beer book, Brew North: How Canadians Made Beer and Beer Made Canada, published in 2010, was short-listed for both the Gourmand World Cookbook Awards in the beer category and the Canadian Culinary Book Awards in the culture category.

His collaboration with nature artist Robert Bateman, Backyard Birds, published by Scholastic Canada and Barron's Educational Series in the United States, won the 2006 Science in Society Award of the Canadian Science Writers' Association in the children's category. In 2004, he was awarded the Tom Fairley Award by the Editors' Association of Canada for his work as project editor on DDay: The Greatest Invasion - A People's History, published by Bloomsbury in the United States and United Kingdom, Raincoast/Madison Press Books in Canada, and publishers in several other markets, including Australia, France and Germany. Other books he has written or co-written include Robert Ballard's Titanic: The Last Great Images (2010) and Dadzooks (2008).
