= Cool Beer Brewing Company =

Microbrewery in Etobicoke, Ontario, Canada

- Headquarters: Etobicoke, Ontario
- Key people: Bobby Crecouzos (founder)

The Cool Beer Brewing Company is a microbrewery in the southern end of Etobicoke, Ontario, in an area known as Mimico.

== History ==
Cool Beer Brewing was founded in 1997 by Bobby Crecouzos. The brewery started off in Brampton, Ontario, as just a small microbrewery serving one type of beer. After the brewery introduced its hemp based brand of beer in 2003, it outgrew its Brampton location, and in 2005, moved to Etobicoke to help maintain growth and meet demand.

== Beers ==
The Cool Beer Brewing offers three types of beer. Cool Beer, a North American Blonde lager, is its flagship brew, which it started brewing in 1997. In 2003, they released Millennium Buzz Hemp Beer, which was the first beer in Canada that is hemp-based. In 2009, the brewery released its third beer, Stonewall Light. This was the first light beer produced by the brewery, and is similar to Cool Beer, but with fewer carbohydrates and calories.

== Packaging ==
The brewery started by offering only bottles and full-sized kegs. In 2013, they added 355 mL slim cans as well as being the first brewery to offer a 3.1 L mini keg to their packaging options.

The beers are offered as bottles in 4 packs, 24 packs, and single cans. In addition to the mini keg, there is also a 20L keg and 58.6L keg available.

== Awards ==
Cool Brewery's beers have won awards at both the provincial and national level. The awards for each beer are listed below.

=== Cool Beer ===
Year	Provincial Awards
2010	Gold Medal
2009	Silver Medal

Year	National Awards
2013	Silver Medal
2008	Bronze Medal
2005	Silver Medal

=== Millennium Hemp ===
Year	Provincial Awards
2015	Bronze Medal
2013	Silver Medal
2012	Gold Medal
2008	Gold Medal
2007	Gold Medal
2006	Gold Medal

Year	National Awards
2014	Gold Medal
2012	Gold Medal
2011	Silver Medal
2009	Silver Medal
2008	Gold Medal
2006	Gold Medal
2005	Gold Medal
2004	Silver Medal

=== Stonewall Light ===
Year	Provincial Awards
2015	Gold Medal
2013	Gold Medal
2012	Gold Medal
2009	Gold Medal

Year	National Awards
2014	Gold Medal
