= All or Nothing Brewhouse =

Canadian brewery in Ontario

- Formerly: Underdog's Brewhouse
- Founded: January 2014
- Founder: Jeff & Eric Dornan
- Headquarters: 439 Ritson Road South; Oshawa, Ontario; L1H 5J8
- Area served: Ontario
- Products: Beer, Mead, Spirits
- Website: http://www.allornothing.beer

All or Nothing Brewhouse was founded in early 2014 in Oshawa, Ontario, Canada. The company started as a contract brewery, brewing their beer out of a third-party facility in Toronto, Ontario. In July 2016, All or Nothing acquired a group of companies being Trafalgar Ales & Meads, Trafalgar Artisanal Distillery and Pioneer Black Creek Brewery to gain access to bricks and mortar production. Trafalgar Ales & Meads prior to acquisition was one of the oldest breweries still operating in the Province of Ontario having been founded in 1993. All or Nothings first beer to market is their "All or Nothing Hopfenweisse", which is a lightly hopped German Weisse beer. The company was founded as Underdog's Brewhouse but, due to a trademark dispute with another craft beer producer, All or Nothing choose to change their name to All or Nothing Brewhouse to avoid a lengthy court battle. All or Nothing Brewhouse is currently a member of the Ontario Craft Brewers Association which represents the majority of breweries in the Province of Ontario.

Building on the companies founding desire to operate and do business in the Durham Region of Ontario the company on November 9, 2018, announced the purchase of the closed 439 Ritson Rd South building. The building was a former Beer Store that operated in Oshawa since it was originally built in the 1950s. All or Nothing officially shut down their Oakville operations at the end of November 2018. All or Nothing Brewhouse formally opened its new Oshawa, Ontario location at 439 Ritson Road South, Oshawa on June 1, 2019. All or Nothing was busy through the early COVID era in 2020 producing hand sanitizer for local establishments. The brewery has continued to build momentum through the years building credibility in its beers and was fortunate to win a gold medal at the Canadian Craft Beer Cup for its "Dare to Compete Dunkel".

== Products ==
Beer & Mead

- All or Nothing Hustle Over Hype Pale Wheat 5.1% ABV
- All or Nothing Think Big'Ger Cream Ale 4.8% ABV
- All or Nothing Snooze You Lose Honey Brown 5.0% ABV
- All or Nothing Celebration Lagered Ale 4.8% ABV
- All or Nothing Blood, Sweat & Tears IPA 6.7% ABV
- All or Nothing Skies The Limits Imperial IPA 8.9% ABV
- All or Nothing Mind Over Matter Mead Braggot 7.0% ABV

Spirits

- Trafalgar Hot Chili Moonshine
- Trafalgar Ontario Wild Botanical Honey Gin

== See also ==
- Ontario Craft Brewers
