= Ontario Craft Brewers =

- Type: Trade Association
- Industry: Beer brewing
- Founded: 2003
- Headquarters: Toronto, Ontario, Canada
- Number of members: 83
- Website: http://www.ontariocraftbrewers.com

The Ontario Craft Brewers (OCB) is a trade association representing 83 small, independent breweries in the Canadian province of Ontario.

== Origins ==
The OCB was founded in 2003 as the Ontario Small Brewers Association to work collectively on marketing and communications programs to promote local breweries and the craft beer being brewed in Ontario. The OCB is funded by member dues and grants provided by the Government of Ontario. The association adopted the name Ontario Craft Brewers and launched their first marketing campaign under that brand in the spring of 2005.

== Craft brewing methods ==
As proponents of the North American craft beer movement, the Ontario Craft Brewers have published a formal OCB Brewing Philosophy mandating members to employ traditional brewing methods, including brewing in small batches, the use of natural quality ingredients, fermentation to final gravity without dilution, and the avoidance of preservatives or additives.

== Market position ==
Since the OCB formed and launched its marketing campaigns, there has been a reported growth in the sales of craft beer within the Ontario market. Craft breweries controlled less than 5 percent of the provincial beer market in 2008. Over 89 per cent of beer in Ontario was sold by The Beer Store (TBS), which is owned by AB InBev, Molson Coors, and Sapporo. The remainder of beer in the province is sold by the Liquor Control Board of Ontario (LCBO), a provincial crown corporation solely responsible for the sale of liquor and spirits in Ontario, and by licensed bars, restaurants, and grocery stores.

== Retailing ==
=== Beer retail changes ===
The Ontario craft brewing industry expansion was supported by changes to the retailing landscape brought in by the Government of Ontario, including beer sold in grocery stores, a new Beer Framework and governance structure for the Beer Store, co-shipping among craft breweries, and a minimum of 20% shelf space allocation in TBS and grocery stores.

=== Beer in grocery stores ===
Starting in mid-December 2015, Ontarians were able to purchase beer in grocery stores, with 58 outlets, comprising grocery store chains and independents, initially licensed across the province. Major Canadian retailer Loblaws led the way by hosting a media launch event in Toronto with the Premier of Ontario and Minister of Finance, and a commitment to stock approximately 50 per cent local, Ontario craft beer. In its first week, Loblaws' sales exceeded expectations, and the company announced plans to expand beer sales.

== Ontario Craft Beer Week ==
In June 2010, the Ontario Craft Brewers initiated the first annual Ontario Craft Beer Week, a festival featuring events taking place at OCB breweries, as well as various bars and restaurants around the province.
