= List of breweries in Ohio =

This is a list of breweries in Ohio.

As of April 2021, there were 366 breweries in operation in Ohio, producing the fifth most beer in the United States. Those breweries support about 83,000 jobs, with a combined economic impact of $10 billion. Each job created in a brewery in the state is estimated to impact 45 additional jobs in agriculture, retail, business services and distribution.

== Breweries ==
=== Northeast Ohio ===
- 5 Barrel Bullet Brewing – New Philadelphia
- 8th Day Brewing - Chagrin Falls
- 17th State Brewing Company (Closed) – Mentor
- Aeonian Brewing Co. - Alliance
- Akronym Brewing – Akron
- Avon Brewing Company – Avon
- Bascule Brewing Company. – Lorain
- Bell Tower Brewing - Kent
- Belmont Brewerks - Martins Ferry
- Biker Brewhouse – Austintown
- Birdfish Brewing Company – Columbiana
- Blue Heron Brewing – Medina
- Blue Monkey Brewing Company – North Royalton
- Bookhouse Brewing Company – Cleveland
- Boss Dog Brewing Company – Cleveland Heights
- BottleHouse Brewery And Meadery – Cleveland Heights
- Breaking Point Brewery – Cleveland Heights
- The Brew Kettle – Amherst
- The Brew Kettle – Strongsville
- BrewLounge Beer - Columbiana
- Brick and Barrel Brewery – Cleveland
- Brighten Brewing Co. - Copley
- Broadview Brewing Co. - Broadview Heights
- Bummin' Beaver Brewing - Chagrin Falls
- Butcher and the Brewer (Cleveland Brewing Company) – Cleveland
- Canton Brewing Company – Canton
- Cleveland Brewery – Cleveland
- Cloven Hoof Brewing Company – Ashtabula
- Clubhouse Brewing Company – Warren
- Codex Brewing – North Canton
- Collision Bend Brewing Company – Cleveland
- Cornerstone Brewing Company – Berea
- Crooked Pecker Brewing Company – Chagrin Falls
- Darkroom Brewing Co. - Geneva
- Double Wing Brewery – Madison
- Dungeon Hollow Brewing – Bloomingdale
- ESP Brewing – Amherst
- Earlybird Brewing (Closed) – Cleveland
- Eighty-Three Brewing – Akron
- Eleventhree Brewing - Chardon
- Fat Head's Brewery and Beerhall – Middleburg Heights
- Fat Head's Brewery and Saloon – North Olmsted
- Fat Head's Brewery – Canton
- Forest City Brewery – Cleveland
- Four Paws Brewing / Red Wagon Brewing - Columbia Station
- Franklin Brewing - Grafton
- Garrett's Mill Brewing Company – Garrettsville
- Ghost Tree Brewing - Amherst
- Goldhorn Brewery – Cleveland
- GOTL Brewing Company – Geneva-on-the-Lake
- Great Lakes Brewing Company – Cleveland
- Greene Eagle Winery / Brewery – Cortland
- Green Valley Brewing Co. - Hudson
- Hansa Haus Brewery – Cleveland
- Happy Street Bru Werks - Mt. Vernon
- Hasseman Brewing Company – Coshocton
- Headtrip Brewing Company – Stow
- Hightower Brewing Company – Rayland
- HiHO Brewing Co. – Cuyahoga Falls
- Hofbrauhaus – Cleveland
- Holy Moley Brewing Co. - Dennison
- Hoodletown Brewing Company – Dover
- Hop Brother's Brewing - North Ridgeville
- Hoppin' Frog Brewery – Akron
- Hoppy Dude Brews - Hinckley
- Ignite Brewing Company – Barberton
- Ill Will Brewing - Columbiana
- Immigrant Son Brewing Co. - Lakewood
- JAFB Wooster Brewery – Wooster
- Jilbert Winery / Brewery – Valley City
- Jolly Scholar Brewery – Cleveland
- Lager Heads Brewing Company – Medina
- Lake Milton Brewing Co. - Lake Milton
- Laxton Hollow Brewing Works – Lexington
- Lil Paws Brewery & Winery (Closed) – Lake Milton
- Lock 15 Brewing – Akron
- Lockport Brewery – Bolivar
- Lucky Owl Brewing – Bainbridge
- MAD Brewing Company - Medina
- MadCap Brewing Company – Kent
- Magic City Brewing Company – Akron
- Main Sail Brewery (Atwood Yacht Club) – Sherrodsville
- Maize Valley Brewery – Hartville
- Market Garden Brewery – Cleveland
- Masthead Brewing Company – Cleveland
- McArthur's Brew House – Cuyahoga Falls
- Medina Brewing Company – Medina
- Meniru Meadery & Brewery (Closed) – Canton
- Mentor Brewing Company - Mentor
- Midnight Owl Brewing - Shaker Heights
- Millersburg Brewing Company – Millersburg
- Missing Falls Brewing Company – Akron
- Missing Mountain Brewing Company – Cuyahoga Falls
- Modern Methods Brewing Company – Warren
- Moe's Tavern Brewing – Cleveland
- Monzula Farm Brewery (22 Vineyard) – Cadiz
- Mount Vernon Brewing Company - Mount Vernon
- Muskellunge Brewing Company – Canton
- Nano Brew Cleveland – Cleveland
- New Berlin Brewing Company - N. Canton
- Noble Beast Brewery – Cleveland
- Noble Creature Cask House – Youngstown
- North Water Brewing – Kent
- Numbers Brewing Company – Lisbon
- Ohio Brewing Company – Cuyahoga Falls
- Paladin Brewing Company – Austintown
- Paradigm Shift Brewing – Massillon
- Penguin City Brewing - Youngstown
- Phoenix Brewing Company – Mansfield
- Planted Flag Brewing – Medina
- Platform Beer Company – Cleveland
- Pulpo Beer Company - Willougby
- Railroad Brewing Company – Avon
- Rocky River Brewing Company – Rocky River
- Royal Docks Brewing Company – Cantonel
- Sandy Springs Brewing Company – Minerva
- Saucy Brew Works – Cleveland
- Schnitz Ale Brewery – Parma
- Sibling Reverly Brewing – Westlake
- Southern Tier Brewing Company – Cleveland
- Spider Monkey Brewing – North Canton
- Starflyer Brewing - Canton
- Terrestrial Brewing Company – Cleveland
- Thirsty Dog Brewing Company – Akron
- Tricky Tortoise Brewing - Willoughby
- Unhitched Brewing Company – Louisville
- Uniontown Brewing Company – Ashland
- Unplugged Brewing Co. - Elyria
- Wadsworth Brewing Company – Wadsworth
- Wooly Pig Farm Brewery – Fresno
- Working Class Brewery – Cleveland
- Wrecking Crew Brewing Company – Medina
- ZZ's Big Top – Avon

=== Southwest Ohio ===
- 13 Below Brewing Company – Cincinnati
- 16 Lots Brewing Company – Mason
- Alematic Artisan Ales – Huber Heights
- Bad Tom Smith Brewing – Cincinnati
- Big Ash Brewing – Cincinnati
- Bocce Brewing - Cincinnati
- Bock Family Brewing - Centerville
- Branch and Bone Artisan Ales – Dayton
- Brausch Brewing – Wilmington
- Braxton Brewing - Cincinnati
- Briar Brown Brewing Company – Arcanum
- Brink Brewing Company – Cincinnati
- Bushrod Brew Works - Eaton
- Carillon Brewing Company – Dayton
- Cartridge Brewing Company – Maineville
- Cellar Dweller Brewery – Morrow
- Christian Moerlein Brewing Co. – Cincinnati
- The Common Beer Company – Mason
- Crooked Handle Brewing Co. – Springboro & Piqua
- The Dayton Beer Company – Dayton
- Dead Low Brewing – Cincinnati
- Devil Wind Brewing Company – Xenia
- DogBerry Brewing LLC – West Chester
- Eudora Brewing Company – Kettering
- Fibonacci Brewing Company – Cincinnati
- Fifth Street Brewpub Co-op – Dayton
- Fifty West Brewing Company – Cincinnati
- Figleaf Brewing Company – Middletown
- Fretboard Brewing Company – Cincinnati
- GlendAleHouse Brewery & Pizza - Glendale
- Grainworks Brewing Company – West Chester
- Hairless Hare Brewery – Vandalia
- Happy 2 Brewery – Cincinnati
- Heavier Than Air Brewing Company – Centerville
- HighGrain Brewing Company – Silverton
- Hudepohl Brewing Company – Cincinnati
- Humble Monk Brewing – Cincinnati
- Karrikin Spirits – Fairfax
- Little Miami Brewing Company – Milford
- Lock 27 Brewing – Centerville
- Loose Ends Brewing - Centerville
- Lucky Star Brewery – Miamisburg
- MadTree Brewing Company – Cincinnati
- March First Brewing Company – Cincinnati
- Mellotone Beer Project - Cincinnati
- Moerlein Lager House – Cincinnati
- Mother Stewart's Brewing Company – Springfield
- Mt. Carmel Brewing Company – Cincinnati
- Municipal Brew Works – Hamilton
- Narrow Path Brewing Company – Loveland
- N.E.W. Ales Brewing – Middletown
- Nine Giant Brewing – Cincinnati
- Northern Row Brewery – Cincinnati
- Nowhere In Particular Cabinet of Curiosity – Kettering
- Paradise Brewing Company – Cincinnati
- Pinups and Pints – Medway
- Rhinegeist Brewery – Cincinnati
- Samuel Adams Brewing Company – Cincinnati
- Sonder Brewing – Mason
- Sons of Toil Brewing Company – Mt. Orab
- Spider Monkey Brewing - Merriam Valley
- Star City Brewing Company – Miamisburg
- Streetside Brewing Company – Cincinnati
- Swine City Brewing Company – Cincinnati
- Taft's Brewpourium – Cincinnati
- Trail Town Brewing - Yellow Springs
- Toxic Brew Co. – Dayton
- Urban Artifact – Cincinnati
- The Wandering Griffin – Beavercreek
- Wandering Monsters Brewing - Cincinnati
- Warped Wing Brewing Company – Dayton
- Warped Wing Barrel House – Springboro
- West Side Brewing Company – Cincinnati
- Wiedemann Brewing Company – Cincinnati
- The Woodburn Brewery – Cincinnati
- Yellow Springs Brewery – Yellow Springs

=== Central Ohio ===
- 2 Tones Brewing – Whitehall
- Antiques on High – Columbus
- Barley's Brewing Co. Ale House No. 1 – Columbus
- Brew Brothers – Columbus
- Brewdog Brewing Co – Canal Winchester
- Buckeye Lake Brewing Company – Buckeye Lake
- Buck's Brewing – Newark
- Columbus Brewing Company – Columbus
- Combustion Brewing – Pickerington
- Crooked Can Brewing – Hilliard
- Dalton Union Winery & Brewery – Marysville
- DankHouse Brewing Company – Newark
- Derive Brewing Co. – Columbus
- Double Edge Brewing Company – Lancaster
- Earthworks Brewing Company – Heath
- Eastside Brewing Company – Reynoldsburg
- Edison Brewing Company – Gahanna
- Endeavor Brewing Company – Columbus
- Forbidden Root Brewing Company – Columbus
- Grizzlybird Brewing (Formally Galena Brewing) – Westerville
- Gemut Biergarten – Columbus
- The Granville Brewing Company – Granville
- Grove City Brewing – Grove City
- Heart State Brewing - Gahanna
- Henmick Farm and Brewery - Delaware
- Hofbrauhaus – Columbus
- Homestead Beer Company – Heath
- Hoof Hearted Brewing Brew Pub – Columbus
- Hoof Hearted Brewing – Marengo
- Hoster's Brewing Co. - Columbus
- Ill Mannered Brewing Company – Powell
- Jackie O's on Fourth - Columbus
- Knotty Pine Brewing – Columbus
- Land-Grant Brewing Co. – Columbus
- Loose Rail Brewing – Canal Winchester
- The Lot Beer Co. – Granville
- Nocterra Brewing Company – Powell
- North High Brewing – Columbus
- North High Brewing – Dublin
- Nostalgia Brewing Company – Gahanna
- Old Dog Alehouse – Delaware
- Olentangy River Brewing Company – Lewis Center
- Outerbelt Brewing – Carroll
- Parsons North Brewing Company – Columbus
- Platform Brewing (Closed February 2023) – Columbus
- Rhetoric Brewing Company- Richwood
- Restoration Brew Worx – Delaware
- Rockmill Brewery – Lancaster
- Saucy Brew Works – Columbus
- Seventh Son Brewing Co. – Columbus
- Somewhere in Particular – Columbus
- Staas Brewing – Delaware
- Stein Brewing Company – Mt. Vernon
- Temperance Row Brewing Co. – Westerville
- Three Tigers Brewing – Granville
- Thunderwing Brewing - Columbus
- Trek Brewing Company – Newark
- Walking Distance Brewing Co. – Marysville
- Wolf's Ridge Brewing – Columbus
- Zaftig Brewing Company – Worthington

=== Southeast Ohio ===
- Belmont Brewerks - Martins Ferry
- Brewery 33 – Logan
- Devil's Kettle Brewing – Athens
- Double Edge Brewing - Lancaster
- Fifty West Brewing Company – Chillicothe
- Hocking Hills Brewing Co. – Logan
- Jackie O's – Athens
- Little Fish Brewing Company – Athens
- Maple Lawn Brewery (Closed) – Pomeroy
- Marietta Brewing Company – Marietta
- Old Bridge Brewing Company – McConnelsville
- Old Capital Brewing - Chillicothe
- Old Mill Craft Beer – Bidwell
- Portsmouth Brewing Company – Portsmouth
- Sixth Sense Brewing Company – Jackson
- Southside Brewing Company – Cambridge
- Weasel Boy Brewing Company – Zanesville
- Y Bridge Brewing Company – Zanesville

=== Northwest Ohio ===
- 1803 Brewing – Galion
- 1820 Brewing - Kalida
- 4kd Crick Brewing Company – Defiance
- 60cc Brewing - Toledo
- Arrogant Goat Brewing - Bucyrus
- Aistear Brewing - Bowling Green
- Arlyn's Good Beer – Bowling Green
- Bait House Brewing Company – Sandusky
- Black Frog Brewing – Toledo
- Bowling Green Beer Works – Bowling Green
- Briar Brown Brewing Company – Arcanum
- Buffalo Rock Brewing - Waterville
- Carey Brewing Station - Carey
- Catawba Island Brewing Company – Port Clinton
- Drop Tine Winery and Tap House – Montpelier
- Earnest Brew Works – Toledo
- Endless Pint Brewing Company (Closed) – Versailles
- Father John's Brewing Company – Bryan
- Findlay Brewing Company – Findlay
- Flatrock Brewing Co. – Napoleon
- Funky Turtle Brewing – Toledo
- Gongoozlers Brewing Company – New Bremen
- Good Steward Brewing Co. - Tiffin
- Great Black Swamp Brewing Company – Toledo
- Hoptometry Brewing Co. - Tiffin
- Indian Lake Brewing Co. - Russells Point
- Inside the Five Brewing Company – Sylvania
- Juniper Brewing Co. - Bowling Green
- Kelley's Island Brewing Company – Kelley's Island
- Laird Arcade Brewery – Tiffin
- Lake Rat Brewing – Celina
- Marion Brewing Co. – Marion
- Maumee Bay Brewing Company – Toledo
- Modcraft Brewing - Findlay
- Moeller's Brew Barn – Maria Stein
- Moeller's Brew Barn Troy – Troy
- Neon Groundhog Brewing – Grand Rapids
- North River Brewing – Wauseon
- Oncore Brewing - Swanton
- Paradune Brewery and Taproom – Huntsville
- Patron Saints Brewing Company – Toledo
- Put-in-Bay Brewing Company – South Bass Island
- Quenched & Tempered Brewing - Toledo
- Roundhouse Depot Brewing Company – Bellefontaine
- Second Crossing Brewing – Rockford
- Tailspin Brewing Company – Coldwater
- Twin Oasts Brewing Company – Port Clinton
- Two Bandits Brewing Company – Hicksville
- Urban Woody Brewery – Fostoria
- Upside Brewing – Sylvania
- White Shutter Winery & Brewery – Nevada
- Wild Side Brewing Company – Grand Rapids

== Closed breweries ==
- 3 Points Brewing – Cincinnati
- 1487 Brewing - Plain City
- Actual Brewing Company – Columbus
- Aqueduct Brewing Company – Akron - opened in 2014 closed 2019
- Bad Tom Smith Brewing – Cleveland
- Bardwell Winery & Brewery - Mt. Orab
- Barrelhead Brewing Company—Over-The-Rhine/Cincinnati
- Black Box Brewing Company - Westlake - opened in 1995 closed in 2017
- Black Cloister Brewing Company – Toledo - opened in 2015 closed 2019
- Blank Slate Brewing Company – Cincinnati – opened in 2012, closed in 2017.
- Brick Oven Brew Pub – Akron - opened in 2014, closed in 2021
- BRIM Kitchen & Brewery – Willoughby - opened in 2017 closed in 2020
- Buckeye Brewing Company (Tap Stack) – Cleveland
- Buzzsaw Brewing - Whitehall
- Chardon BrewWorks – Chardon – oprnened in 2010 closed in 2017
- Cincy Brewing - Lockwood
- Crafted Culture Brewing - Gahanna
- Dayton Beer Company – Kettering – opened in 2012 closed in 2017
- Eldridge & Fiske Brewery – Lithopolis
- Elevator Brewing Co. - Columbus
- Euclid Brewing Company – Euclid – opened in 2016 closed in 2017
- Four String Brewing Co. – Columbus – opened in 2011 closed in 2018
- Franklin Brewing Company – Elyria
- Gordon Biersch Brewing – Columbus - opened in 2001 closed in 2020
- Hop Tree Brewing Company – Hudson
- Indigo Imp Brewing Company – Cleveland – opened in 2009 closed in 2015
- Kindred Brewing – Gahanna – opened in 2016 closed in 2019 (location now Crafted Culture)
- Lineage Brewing Co. – Columbus
- Listermann Brewing Company/Triple Digit Brewing Company – Cincinnati
- Little Mountain Brewing Company – Mentor – opened in 2010 closed in 2016
- Mucky Duck Brewery – Akron
- Multiple Brewing – Nelsonville - opened in 2016 closed in 2019 (became Nostalgia at old Pigskin location)
- Neil House Brewing – Columbus
- Off Track Brewing - Cincinnati
- Old Firehouse Brewery – Williamsburg
- Pigskin Brewing Co – Gahanna – opened in 2015 closed in 2018
- Portside Distillery and Brewery – Cleveland – opened in 2015, closed in 2017.
- Pour Boys' Brew House – Washington Court House – opened in 2016 closed in 2017
- Pretentious Barrel House – Columbus
- Quarter Barrel Brewery & Pub – Oxford – opened 2018 closed in 2019
- Queen City Brewery Company – Cincinnati – closed in 2019
- RAM Restaurant & Brewery – Columbus – opened in 2016 closed in 2018
- RAM Restaurant & Brewery – Dublin - opened in 2017 closed in 2019
- Random Precision Brewing Company – Columbus
- Rivertown Brewing and Barrel House – Monroe
- Rock Bottom BC – Cincinnati - opened in 1996 closed in 2020
- Rolling Mill Brewery - Middletown
- R. Shea Brewing Company – Akron
- Rust Belt Brewing Company – Youngstown Permanently closed per Google
- Scenic Brewing Company – Canton – opened in 2015 closed in 2017
- Shale Brewing - N. Canton
- Sideswipe Brewing - Columbus
- SIP Local Brewery – Columbus
- Smokehouse Brewing - Columbus
- Sojourners Brewstillery – Centerville
- Taft's Ale House - Cincinnati
- Tap and Screw Brewery – Cincinnati – opened in 2014 closed in 2018
- Thirsty Dog—Dayton/Centerville
- The Tiffin Brewery – Tiffin
- Trailhead Brewing Company – Akron – opened in 2013 closed in 2015
- Twenty Nine Brewpub – Marion – opened in 2015 closed due to fire in 2019
- Two Monks Brewing - Akron
- Willoughby Brewing Company – Willoughby
- Zaftig Brewing Italian Village - Columbus
- Zauber Brewing Company – Columbus – opened in 2011 closed in 2017

== See also ==
- Beer in the United States
- List of breweries in the United States
- List of defunct breweries in the United States
- List of microbreweries
