= OBW =

OBW may refer to:

- Ohio Brew Week, a festival held annually in Athens, Ohio
- On Broken Wings, an American metalcore band
- OB West, the German Army Command in the West during World War II
