= Ohio City, Cleveland =

Neighborhood of Cleveland, Ohio, United States

Ohio City
- Neighborhood of Cleveland

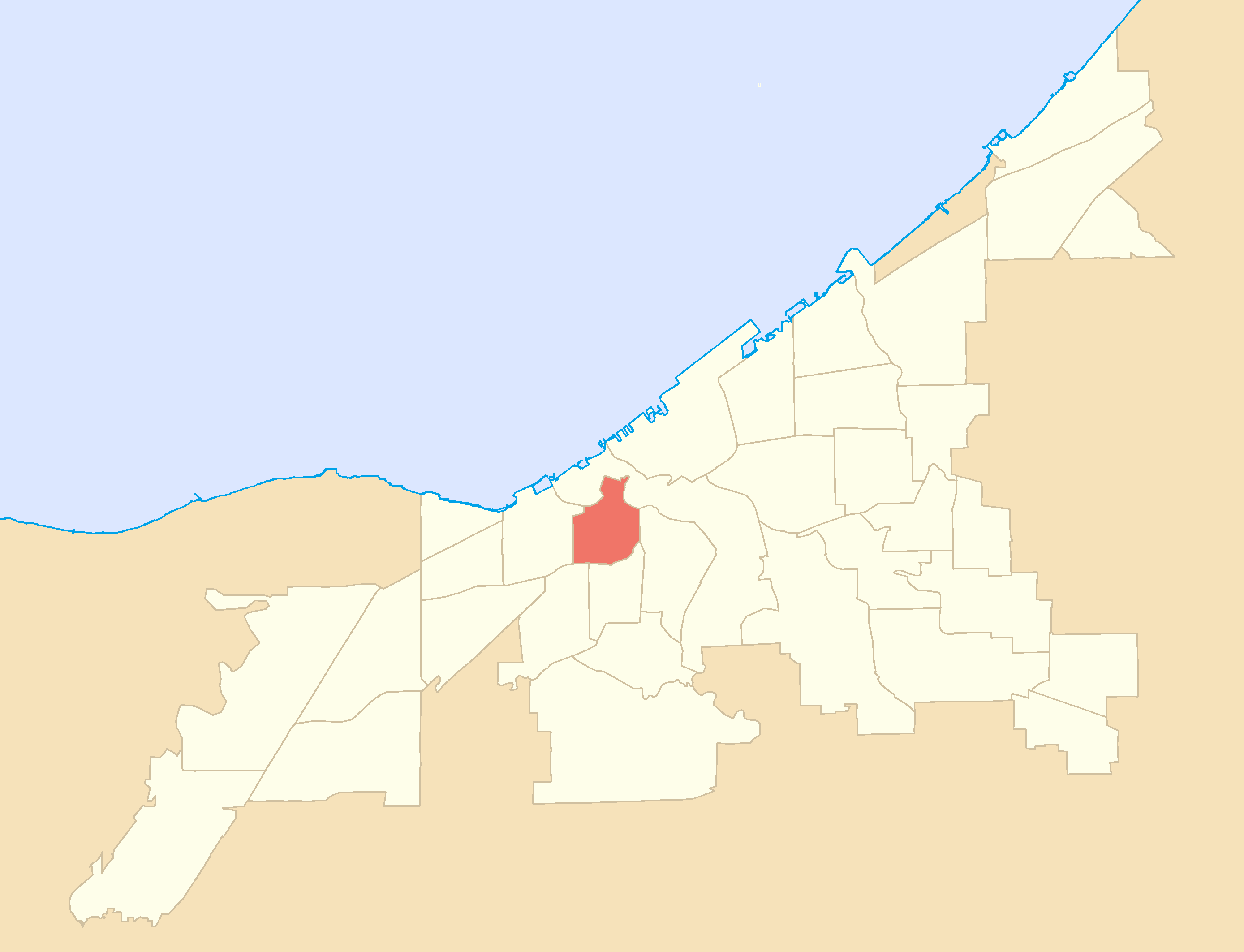
- Country: United States
- State: Ohio
- County: Cuyahoga County
- City: Cleveland

Population (2020)
  - Total: 8,389

Demographics
  - White: 60.4%
  - Black: 28.1%
  - Hispanic (of any race): 14.6%
  - Asian and Pacific Islander: 2.1%
  - Mixed and Other: 9.4%
- Time zone: UTC-5 (EST)
  - Summer (DST): UTC-4 (EDT)
- ZIP Codes: 44113, 44102
- Area code: 216
- Median income: $40,170
- Source: 2020 U.S. Census, City Planning Commission of Cleveland

- Ohio City Preservation District
- U.S. National Register of Historic Places
- U.S. Historic district
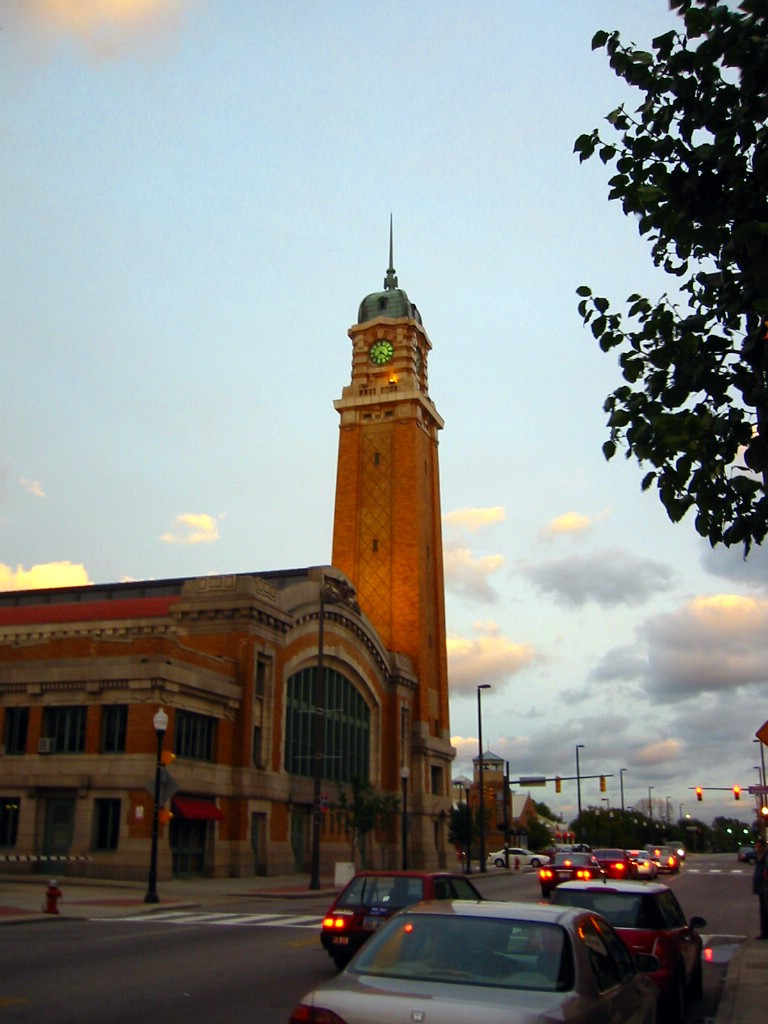
- The West Side Market

- Location within Cleveland Location within Ohio Location within the United States
- Location: Roughly Franklin Blvd. NW., W. 38th St., Bridge Ave. NW., & W. 44th St., & Stone, W. 25th, Bridge Ave. NW., & W. 28th, Cleveland, Ohio
- Coordinates: 41°29′1″N 81°42′37″W
- Architectural style: Greek Revival, Italianate, Queen Anne
- NRHP reference No.: 74001447 (original); 89000435 (increase)

Significant dates
- Added to NRHP: October 9, 1974
- Boundary increase: May 25, 1989

Ohio City is one of the oldest neighborhoods in Cleveland, Ohio. It is located immediately west of the Cuyahoga River.

== History ==
The City of Ohio became an independent municipality on March 3, 1836, splitting from Brooklyn Township. The city grew from a population of 2,400 people in the early 1830s to over 4,000 in 1850. The municipality was annexed by Cleveland on June 5, 1854. There was contention between the Cleveland and Ohio City citizens that led to the "Bridge War" of 1836 with violence over the use of the Columbus Road Bridge. Nearly two centuries later, Great Lakes Brewing introduced "Bridge War Black IPA" to commemorate the fracas.

James A. Garfield, who became the 20th president of the United States, frequently preached at Franklin Circle Christian Church in 1857. Franklin Circle Christian Church is located at the intersection of Franklin Boulevard and Fulton Road.

The birthplace of John Heisman, famous for the annual Heisman Trophy awarded to the best player in college football, is located in Ohio City. He was born in the neighborhood in 1869, and an Ohio Historical Society marker stands in commemoration near the corner of Bridge Avenue and West 29th Place.

== Features ==
The salient feature of Ohio City's business district is the historic West Side Market, built in 1912. The European-styled market, located at the intersection of Lorain Avenue and West 25th Street, draws an estimated one million visitors annually. Located north of the West Side Market is The Ohio City Fresh Food Collaborative, one of the largest contiguous urban farms in America. The operation includes a farm, retail farm stand and community kitchen on a 6-acre city parcel. Ohio City chef Parker Bosley was an early farmer's market supporter.

Ohio City contains the largest concentration of craft breweries in Cleveland, which includes Hansa Brewing, Market Garden Brewery, Nanobrew, Platform Beer, Saucy Brew Works, Bad Tom Smith Brewing, and the state of Ohio's oldest microbrewery, the Great Lakes Brewing Company. (Both Market Garden and Great Lakes have fullscale brewpubs adjacent to the West Side Market, with the latter occupying a building that formerly housed the Market Tavern, a pub frequented by Eliot Ness.)

Saint Ignatius High School, a Jesuit college prep school, is located near the West Side Market. Founded in 1886, the school has a long list of distinguished graduates and is a perennial contender in several OHSAA sports.

The Cleveland Hostel, which opened in 2012, is the first and only hostel in the city of Cleveland. The hostel was located on West 25th Street and Chatham Avenue adjacent to the W.25th Street Station on the RTA Red Line.

Serving as the only auxiliary location for the Cleveland Museum of Art, the Transformer Station, located at Church and West 29th Street, functions primarily as its contemporary art gallery space.

St. John's Episcopal Church, located at Church and West 26th Street, is the oldest consecrated building in Cuyahoga County and is the mother church of the current Episcopal cathedral located in downtown Cleveland. The church was one of the final stops on the Underground Railroad in Northeastern Ohio, and the remains of an entrance to a tunnel leading to the banks of the nearby Cuyahoga River can still be seen in the basement. Several nearby streets retain church-related names, such as Vestry. An Episcopal parish continues to worship in the space, although membership has dramatically declined with the demographic changes in the neighborhood.

The Carnegie West Branch of Cleveland Public Library has been in continuous operation since opening in 1910. Designed by Edward Tilton, the architect of four buildings on Ellis Island in New York, Carnegie West features a modified Renaissance and classical style exterior.

Ohio City has experienced a building and development in recent years. As such, the neighborhood has attracted young professionals, microbreweries, artisans, and locally owned shops and restaurants. It is widely regarded as one of Ohio's most trendy neighborhoods for all ages, ethnicities, and lifestyles.

== Demographics ==
The demographics of Ohio City have changed rather dramatically in the latter half of the 20th century and first part of the 21st. Originally composed mainly of English and German descendants, many Eastern European immigrants moved into the area during the migrations in the first half of the 20th century. In the 1960s and 1970s, as Cleveland expanded and the wealthy moved to the surrounding suburbs (including Parma, Brooklyn, and Lakewood), the percentage of African Americans increased. The size of the Latino community has also increased. However, Cleveland City Council, with an eye on redevelopment and with the incentive of tax breaks, has lured an increasing number of suburbanites of all backgrounds back into the Ohio City area. This has led to a diverse community.

== Gallery ==
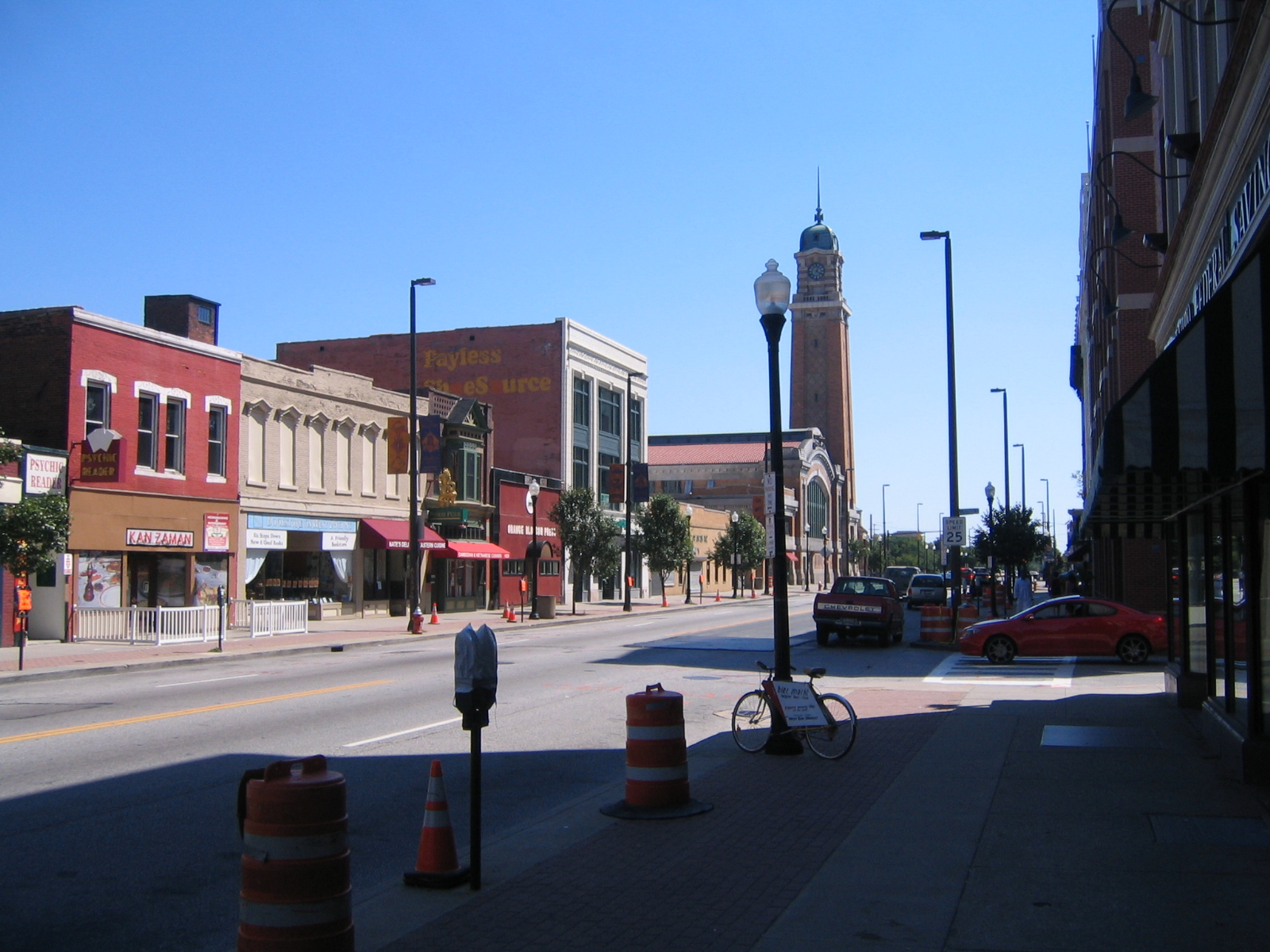
Looking down Ohio City's retail hub, West 25th Street

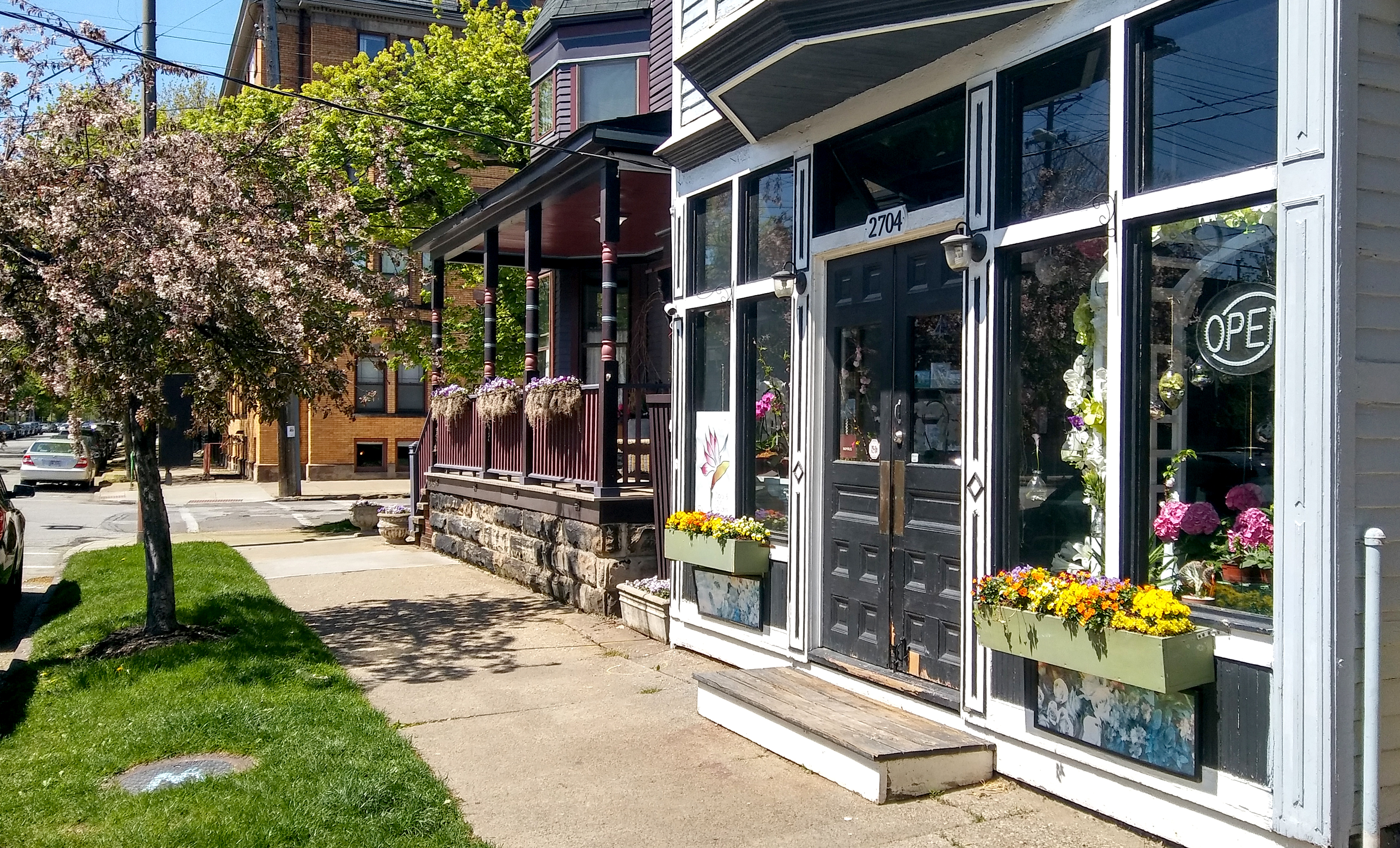
Ohio City in the Spring, near the corner of West 28th Street and Bridge Avenue

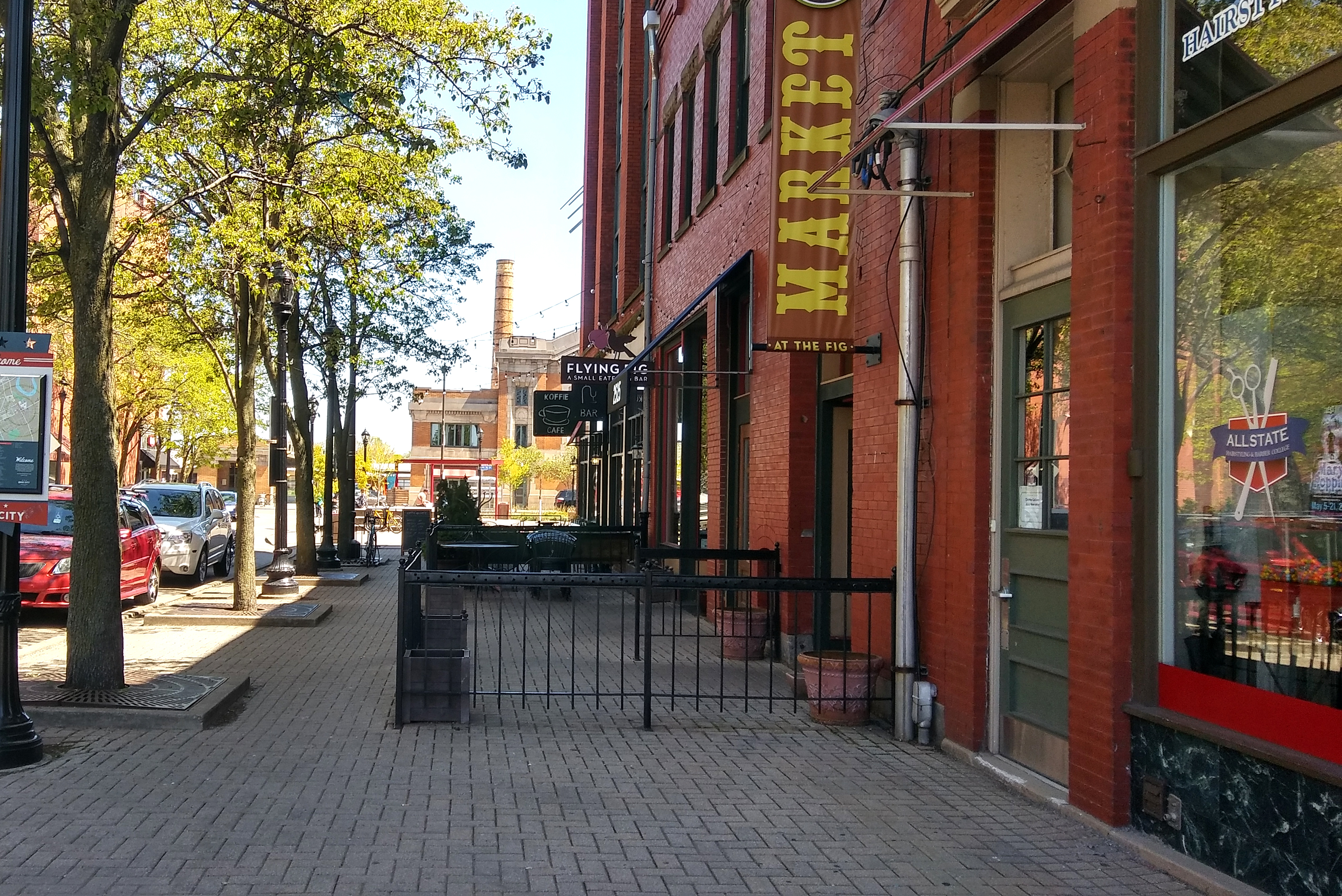
Looking northeast on Market Street towards West 25th Street with The West Side Market in the background

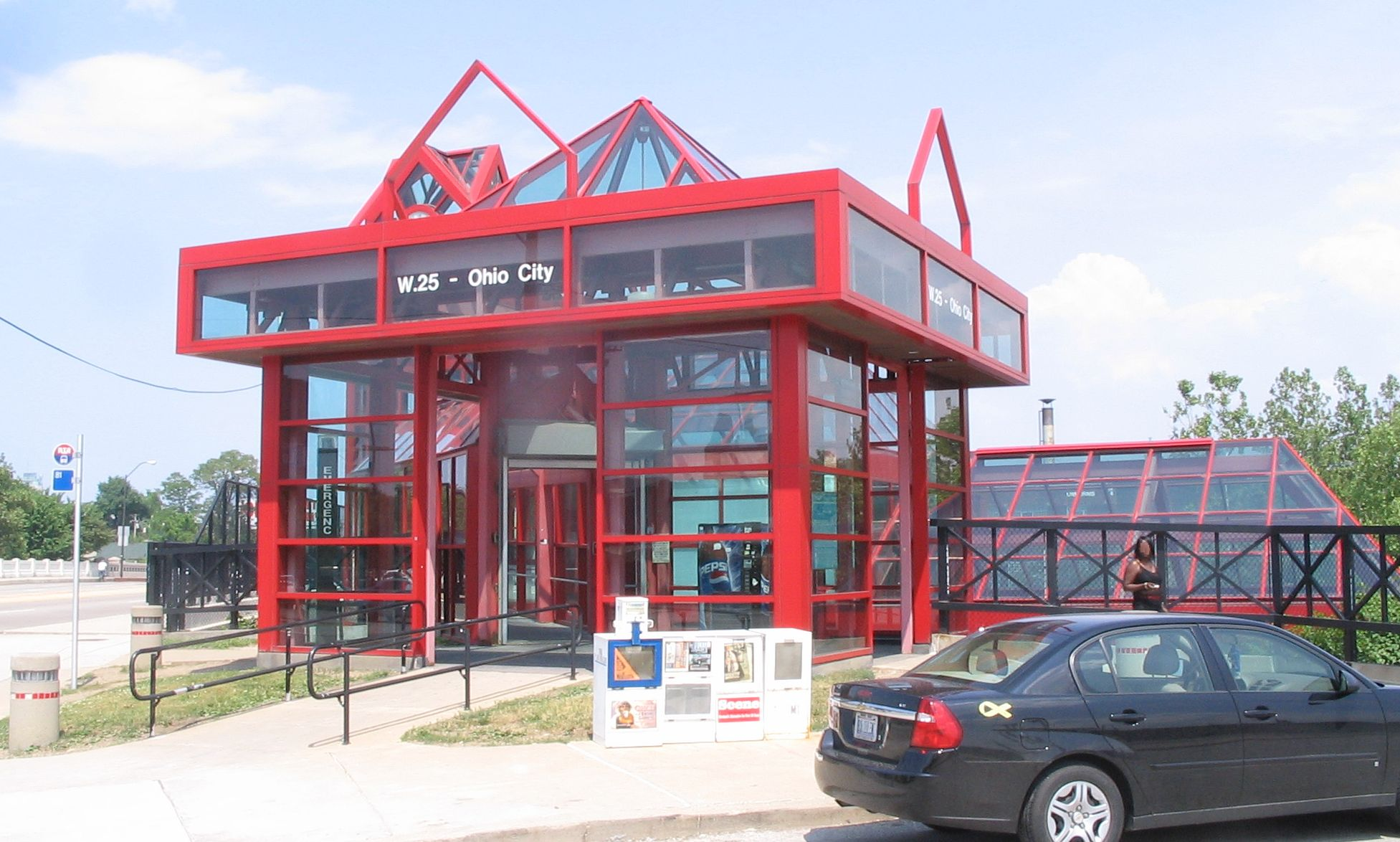
Ohio City's rapid transit station

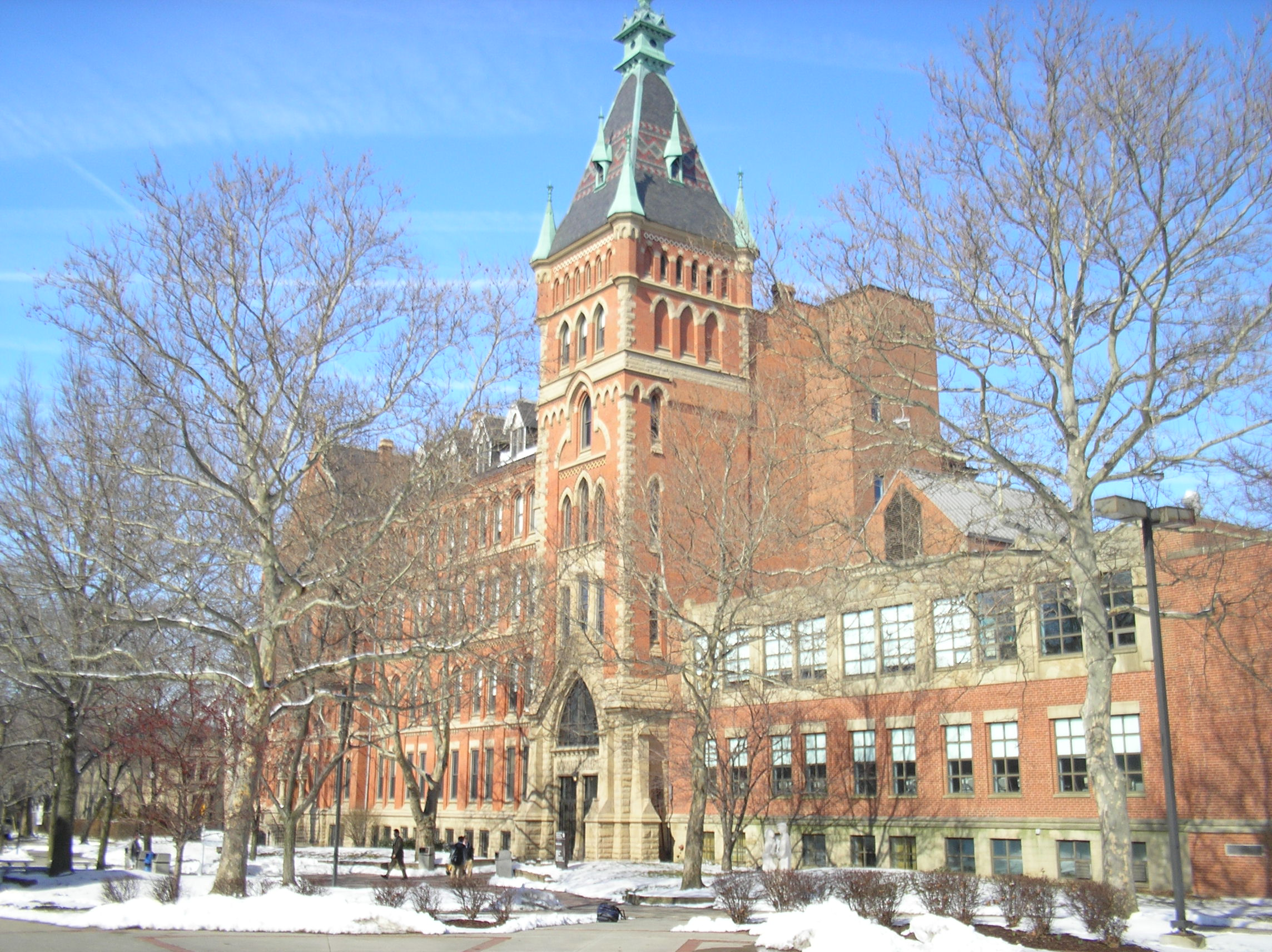
Saint Ignatius High School main building, completed 1891

A locally used flag for the neighborhood of Ohio City.
