= Ohio Brew Week =

- Status: active
- Genre: food festivals
- Frequency: Annually
- Location: Athens, Ohio
- Coordinates: 39.33°N 82.10°W
- Country: United States
- Years active: 20–21
- Inaugurated: 2005
- Website: ohiobrewweek.com

Ohio Brew Week is a festival held annually in Athens, Ohio. The 9-day celebration of Ohio brewing brings together brewers and beer lovers from all around the nation to sample beers and celebrate the joy of craft brewing. It is a week full of the celebration of “craft beer and Ohio pride.” More than 26 different breweries located around Ohio showcase their beer at restaurants, bars, and breweries in uptown Athens.

These breweries include: Great Lakes Brewing Co. in Cleveland, Rhinegeist Brewing Co. in Cincinnati, and a local favorite, Jackie O's Brewery in Athens. Events, concerts, and competitions are held throughout the week as well as barbecue cookouts, multiple happy hours, dinners, "meet the brewer", pool tournaments, tastings, golf outings, karaoke, corn hole tournaments, trivia, a haunted tour, and other activities.

== Locations ==
More than 35 businesses that consistently support and serve the Brews of the Week. Many other local bars and restaurants participate as well. Some continuous supporters are:

· Athens Country Club

· Broney’s Alumni Grill

· Casa Nueva

· The CI

· Jackie O’s Brew Pub

· Lucky’s Sports Tavern

· The Oak Room

· The Ohio University Inn & Conference Center

· Pawpurr’s

· The Pigskin Sports Bar and Grill

· The Union

· Zoe

== History ==
Ohio Brew Week started when businesses lost their customers (students) in the summer due to school being out and students going home for the summer. Businesses needed a reason to bring back students or the people living in Athens and surrounding cities. Two local Athens residents began Ohio Brew Week in 2005. That week had more than 70 craft brews sold by 26 proprietors, mostly in uptown Athens.

The Ohio Beer Week expanded as craft beers became plentiful in grocery stores. In 2016, more than 45 Ohio breweries participated in Ohio Brew Week. The 2017 festival will feature more than 200 types of beers.

2020 saw no crowds as the Brew Week went virtual for the first time caused by the COVID-19 pandemic.

== Events ==
Ohio Brew Week attracts national attention each year. Each year brings different speakers to highlight the different breweries or beers offered. Some keynote speakers have been:

- Alan Eames, the late “Indiana Jones of Beer”
- Steve Hindy, president of Brooklyn Brewery (and former Athens Messenger paperboy)
- Joe Tucker, executive director of RateBeer.com
- Pat Conway, co-founder of Great Lakes Brewing Company

A big tradition held at Ohio Brew Week is the Homebrew Competition. Participants may enter their own home-brewed beer to be judged and ranked among other participants brew entries. Judges will choose the best Brews among several categories.

Another fun tradition is the Athens Cuisine Showcase. Beer makers come together to sample others' beers. The entries must be made with or served with one of the week's craft beers.

In another event, the Brew Barbecue Cook-Off, contestants vie to win barbecue and craft beer competitions. The entries can either consist of meals served with beer or made with beer.

Boogie on the Bricks, a community music and arts street fair, often concludes Brew Week. This Community Music & Arts Street Festival held on the bricks of Athens. The week closes with a street dance featuring an eclectic array of musicians.
