= Fat Head's Brewery =

American brewery

- Opened: 2009
- Key people: Matt Cole; Glenn Benigni

Active beers
| Name | Type |
| Goggle Fogger | German-Style Hefe-Weizen |
| Güdenhoppy | German-Style Pilsner |
| Head Hunter | India Pale Ale |
| Starlight | Helles Lager |
| Sunshine Daydream | Session IPA |
| Trail Head | Pale Ale |

Seasonal beers
| Name | Type |
| AlpenGlow | Weizenbock |
| Battle Axe | Baltic Porter |
| Bean Me Up | Imperial Coffee Stout |
| Black Knight | Schwarzbier |
| Bone Head | Imperial Red Ale |
| The Boogaloo | Belgian Blonde |
| Bumble Berry | Honey Blueberry Ale |
| Head Trip | Belgian-Style Tripel |
| Hippy Sippy | Imperial Stout |
| Holly Jolly | Christmas Ale |
| Hop Juju | Imperial IPA |
| Hop Stalker | Fresh Hop IPA |
| Kohlminator | German-Style Smoked Bock |
| Oompa Loompa | Chocolate Cream Stout |
| Pimp My Sleigh | Belgian-Style Christmas Ale |
| Prohibition Pauly | Robust Porter |
| Sorcerer | Belgian-Style Dark Strong Ale |
| Shakedown | Imperial American Stout |
| Spooky Tooth | Pumpkin Ale |
| Up In Smoke | Smoked Porter |
| Zeus Juice | Belgian Strong Golden Ale |

Other beers
| Name | Type |
| Duke of Lager | Lager |
| Pseudo Pils | Pilsner |
| Rocket Man | Red Ale |
| Ultra Pils | North German-Stlyle Pilsner |
| Zoobomb Dortmunder | Dortmunder Export |

Brewmaster Matt Cole partnered with Glenn Benigni, owner of Fat Head's Saloon in Pittsburgh, Pennsylvania, to open Fat Head's Brewery & Saloon in Cleveland, Ohio in 2009, with Cole supplying beer to the Pittsburgh location. A production brewery opened in Middleburg Heights, Ohio in March 2012 and another brewpub location opened in Portland, Oregon in November 2014, which has since closed. Fat Head's is known for their signature beers Head Hunter IPA and Bumble Berry Honey Blueberry Ale.

== Background ==
Fat Head's Saloon opened in the historic South Side of Pittsburgh, Pennsylvania in 1992 and grew to be known for its selection of craft beer and large sandwiches, called "headwiches."

Brewer Matt Cole apprenticed at Baltimore Brewing Co., then worked at Penn Brewery and Great Lakes Brewing Company before joining Rocky River Brewing Company. Cole spent more than a decade there, winning several awards at both Great American Beer Festival and World Beer Cup.

== Fat Head's Brewery & Saloon ==
Fat Head's Brewery & Saloon opened in North Olmsted, Ohio, a suburb of Cleveland, on April 7, 2009. The brewpub has a 35-seat bar and a 200-seat dining room. There are 30 rotating tap handles that serve beers from Fat Head's as well as guest breweries. There is also a game room with a video games, a vintage bowling machine, pool tables, and dart boards. Derek Wilson, formerly of Great Lakes Brewing Company, heads the kitchen. In addition to the signature headwiches, a staple at the Pittsburgh Saloon, Wilson added stone oven pizzas, smoke house wings, and pulled pork to the menu.

Fat Head's Brewery opened in March, 2012 in a warehouse in Middleburg Heights, Ohio. The production brewery supplies beer for the Fat Head's restaurants in Pittsburgh and North Olmsted, as well as bottles and kegs for distributes. As of 2013, the brewery has a BrauKon brewhouse that was purchased from Tröegs Brewing Company. A tasting room and retail shop opened on October 18, 2013.

== Fat Head's Portland ==
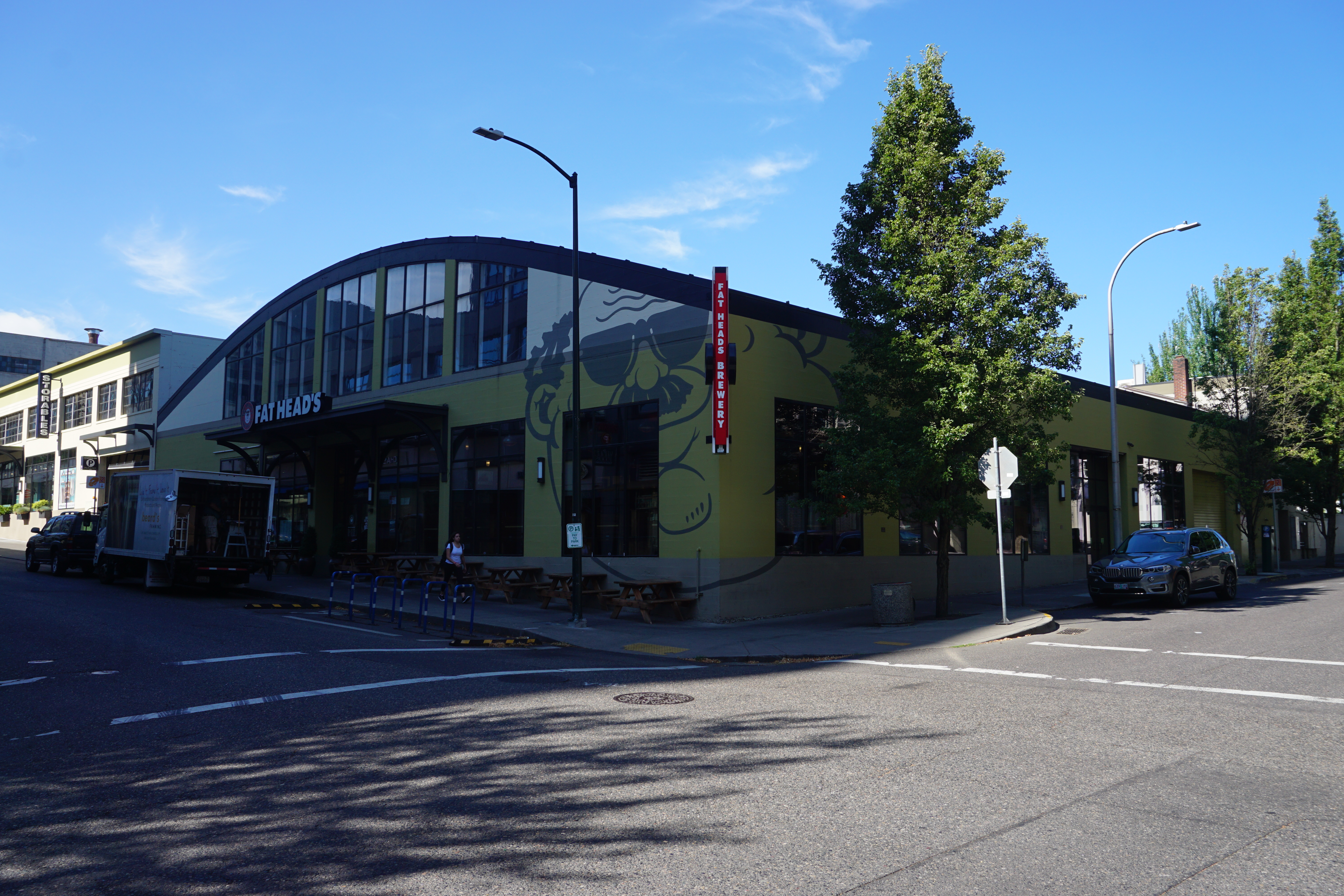
Fat Head's Brewery in Portland

Fat Head's opened in the Pearl District of Portland, Oregon on November 3, 2014. In 2018, the location changed owners and became Von Ebert Brewing, a Portland-based company. The brewpub had 278 seats throughout the bar and dining room and 42 rotating tap hands that served beers from Fat Head's as well as guest breweries. The brewery featured a 10-barrel JVNW brewhouse with 13 fermentors and 12 bright tanks. Matt Cole was the brewmaster, with Eric Van Tassel who served as the head brewer. They served Fat Head's signature beers, including Bumble Berry Honey Blueberry Ale and Head Hunter IPA, as well as some of their own creations, including Zoobomb Dortmunder and Ultra Pils North German-Stlyle Pilsner.

== Awards ==
| Year | Beer Name | Award | Category | Competition |
|---|---|---|---|---|
| 2009 | Head Hunter IPA | Gold | American-Style India Pale Ale | West Coast IPA Fest |
| 2009 | Up In Smoke | Silver | Smoked Beer | Great American Beer Festival |
| 2010 | Head Hunter IPA | Silver | American-Style India Pale Ale | Great American Beer Festival |
| 2010 | Head Hunter IPA | Grand Champion | American-Style India Pale Ale | National IPA Challenge |
| 2011 | Battle Axe Baltic Porter | Gold | Baltic-Style Porter | Great American Beer Festival |
| 2011 | Head Hunter IPA | Gold | American-Style India Pale Ale | Denver International Beer Fest |
| 2011 | Head Hunter IPA | Bronze | American-Style India Pale Ale | Great American Beer Festival |
| 2012 | Alpenglow | Silver | German-Style Wheat Ale | Great American Beer Festival |
| 2012 | Battle Axe Baltic Porter | Silver | Baltic-Style Porter | World Beer Cup |
| 2012 | Head Hunter IPA | Gold | American-Style India Pale Ale | West Coast IPA Fest |
| 2012 | Head Hunter IPA | Grand Champion | American-Style India Pale Ale | National IPA Challenge |
| 2012 | Head Hunter IPA | Silver | American-Style India Pale Ale | World Beer Cup |
| 2013 | Black Knight | Silver | German-Style Schwarzbier | Great American Beer Festival |
| 2013 | Hop JuJu | Gold | Imperial India Pale Ale | Great American Beer Festival |
| 2013 | Trail Head | Silver | Fresh Hop Ale | Great American Beer Festival |
| 2014 | AlpenGlow | Gold | German-Style Wheat Ale | Great American Beer Festival |
| 2014 | Battle Axe Baltic Porter | Silver | Baltic-Style Porter | Denver International Beer Fest |
| 2014 | Black Knight | Gold | German-Style Schwarzbier | Denver International Beer Fest |
| 2014 | Bone Head Imperial Red Ale | Silver | Imperial Red Ale | World Beer Cup |
| 2014 | Head Hunter IPA | Silver | American-Style India Pale Ale | World Beer Cup |
| 2015 | Black Knight | Silver | German-Style Schwarzbier | Great American Beer Festival |
| 2015 | Hop Juju | Gold | Imperial India Pale Ale | Great American Beer Festival |
| 2015 | Bone Head Red | Gold | Double Red Ale | Great American Beer Festival |
| 2015 | Midnight Moonlight | Gold | American-Style Black Ale | Great American Beer Festival |
| 2015 | Blitzkrieg Bock (Portland) | Gold | Rye Beer | Great American Beer Festival |
| 2016 | Hop Juju | Gold | Imperial India Pale Ale | World Beer Cup |
| 2016 | Midnight Moonlight | Bronze | American-Style Black Ale | World Beer Cup |
| 2016 | Hop Juju | Bronze | Imperial India Pale Ale | Great American Beer Festival |
| 2016 | IBUsive IPA | Bronze | Fresh or Wet Hop Ale | Great American Beer Festival |
| 2016 | Black Muddy River Imperial Black IPA | Silver | Other Strong Beer | Great American Beer Festival |
| 2016 | Midnight Moonlight Black IPA | Silver | American-Style Black Ale | Great American Beer Festival |
| 2016 | Alpenglow | Gold | German-Style Wheat Ale | Great American Beer Festival |
| 2017 | Sunshine Daydream Session IPA | Grand Champion | Session IPA | National Session IPA Challenge |
| 2017 | Alpenglow | Gold | German-Style Wheat Ale | Great American Beer Festival |
| 2017 | Midnight Moonlight | Bronze | American-Style Black Ale | Great American Beer Festival |
| 2018 | Alpenglow | Gold | South German-Style Weizenbock | World Beer Cup |
| 2018 | Midnight Moonlight | Silver | American-Style Black Ale | World Beer Cup |
| 2018 | Midnight Moonlight | Bronze | American-Style Black Ale | Great American Beer Festival |

== See also ==
- Beer and breweries by region
- Beer in the United States
- List of breweries in Ohio
- List of microbreweries
- List of breweries in the United States
