= Batavia Club =

- U.S. National Register of Historic Places
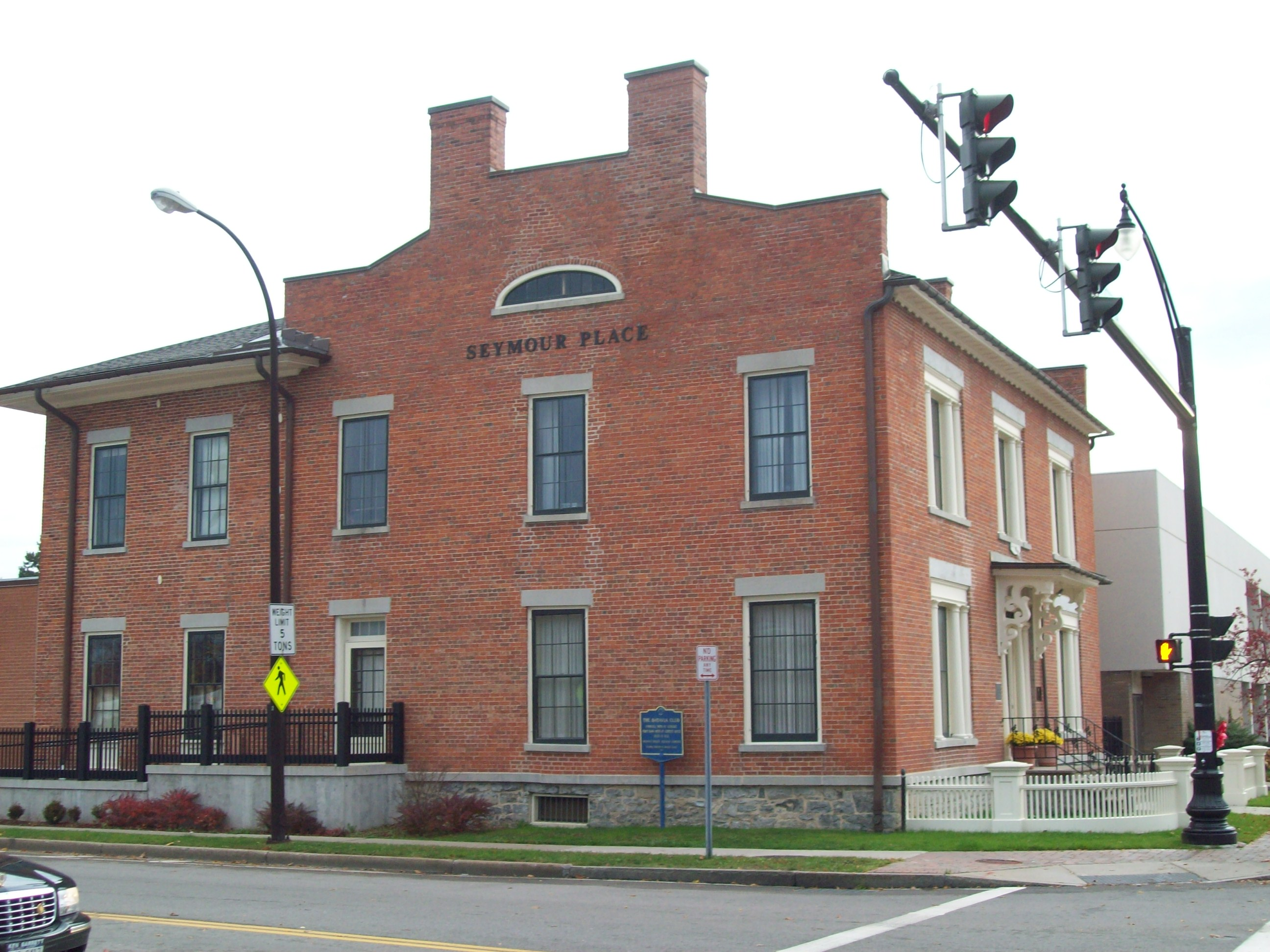
- East profile and south elevation, 2009

- Location within New York Location within the United States
- Interactive map showing the location for Batavia Club
- Location: Batavia, NY
- Coordinates: 42°59′51″N 78°10′53″W
- Built: 1831
- Architect: Hezekiah Eldredge
- Architectural style: Federal style
- NRHP reference No.: 73001192
- Added to NRHP: June 19, 1973

The Batavia Club building, built originally as the Bank of Genesee, is on the corner of East Main (New York state routes 5 and 33) and Bank streets in Batavia, New York, United States. It is a brick Federal style building from the 1830s, one of the few remaining examples in New York of a commercial building in that style from that period.

Of the two extant works in New York of Rochester architect-builder Hezekiah Eldredge, it is the less restrained, serving as a bank and a residence for the cashier. The Batavia Club purchased the building in 1886 and used it for many years. In 1973, it was listed on the National Register of Historic Places. After the club moved out in 2000, it became the Seymour Place facility of GO ART!, the Genesee-Orleans Regional Arts Council.

== Building ==
The building is on the intersection's northeast corner. On the other corners, there are more modern commercial buildings, as on both sides of East Main. To the northwest is the Genesee Country Mall's large parking area. Two blocks to the west is Batavia's city hall and the Genesee County Courthouse Historic District, the collection of government buildings at downtown's western edge.

The former clubhouse is an L-shaped two-story three-by-five-bay brick building on a stone foundation with a stepped gable roof. Two chimneys rise at the east and west ends. A one-story cement block kitchen addition is built on the north (rear) of the main section, replacing an earlier kitchen wing. The rear has two sections, the three-bay west elevation of the main block and a two-bay rear projection.

All windows have plain stone sills and lintels. On the south (front) facade, they are additionally flanked by paired wooden colonettes. The main entrance, with sidelights, is similarly decorated and topped with a heavy wooden bracketed flat-roofed hood. The small front yard has a wooden fence with wide square recessed-paneled columns.

At the front, and on the rear extension, the roofline is marked by overhanging eaves with a dentilled soffit. On the side elevations a parapet with the chimneys rises above the roofline. The six-over-six double-hung sash windows have just the sill and lintel. Above them, in the gable field, is a wide fanlight and "SEYMOUR PLACE" in metal lettering on the west side. The main block's northern window has been converted into an entrance with four-paned glass transom. Stairs and a wheelchair ramp lead to it from the north.

Inside, the central hallway divides a living room, formerly the banking room and now an art gallery, on the west from a dining room (also used as a gallery on occasion) with two fireplaces running the length of the building to the east. The woodwork, such as the stairs and mantels, is original and well-maintained. In the rear are the kitchen facilities, with some past fire damage evident, a bar and storage space. The upstairs rooms are plainer. Largely unused during the club's ownership, they are today office space for the arts council.

== History ==
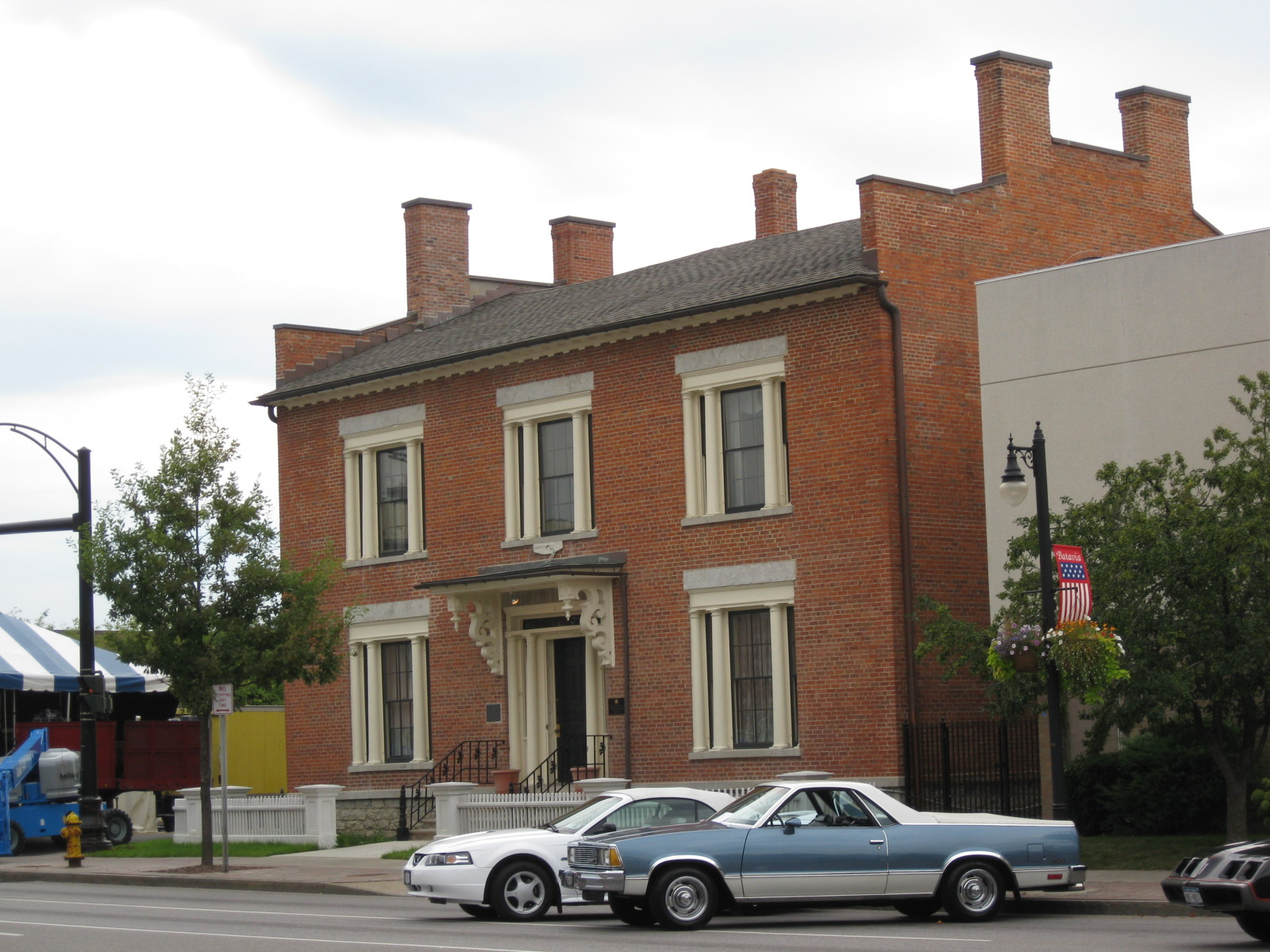
Front view

In the early 19th century, Batavia was the headquarters of the Holland Land Company, owners of the Holland Purchase that became Western New York. As the region's largest settlement at the time, it was an ideal place for a bank, and thus the Bank of Genesee was established in the city in 1829. For a year it operated from the local mansion of its first president.

The new bank bought the location of the current building in 1830. Hezekiah Eldredge and his partner, Joshua Driscoll of Lockport, were commissioned to design a building. They had designed banks in Driscoll's hometown as well as Buffalo, where one of the bank's directors was also on the board of the Genesee and may have helped them get the assignment. It was to be home to the bank's cashier as well.

Six thousand dollars ($181,000 in contemporary dollars) was budgeted for construction. After going well in excess of that budget, Driscoll and Eldredge's building was finished the following year. The high cost may have been the result of paying some of the region's best craftsmen high hourly wages to produce a building far less restrained than the Lockport Bank building, the only other work of Eldredge's that remains in the region (now a contributing property to the Lowertown Historic District).

The bank sold the building to the club in 1886, four years after it was organized. It made such alterations as were necessary for the purposes of using the building as the headquarters of a fraternal organization. The most significant was moving the main entrance to the south facade, facing Main Street.

In 1966, a fire damaged the original kitchen wing, and the current cement-block wing was built as a replacement. Urban renewal in the 1970s demolished the surrounding buildings, leaving the club as the only remaining 19th-century building in the neighborhood. In 2000 the club closed down, leaving the building vacant.

GO ART!, the Genesee-Orleans Regional Arts Council, moved in two years later. In 2008, the group received a grant from the State Office of Parks, Recreation and Historic Preservation to renovate and restore the building. Upon the completion of work in 2010, it was renamed Seymour Place in memory of a local couple, longtime benefactors of the center, who had contributed much of the matching funds to make the $320,000 project possible. Work done at that time exposed the basement's original dirt floors, as well as a safe on rollers the center has not been able to open. GO ART! uses the building for art exhibits and performances, and makes the space available to community groups for meetings. It is also rented for events such as wedding receptions and showers.

== See also ==
- National Register of Historic Places listings in Genesee County, New York
