= Rye beer =

Beer made partly from rye

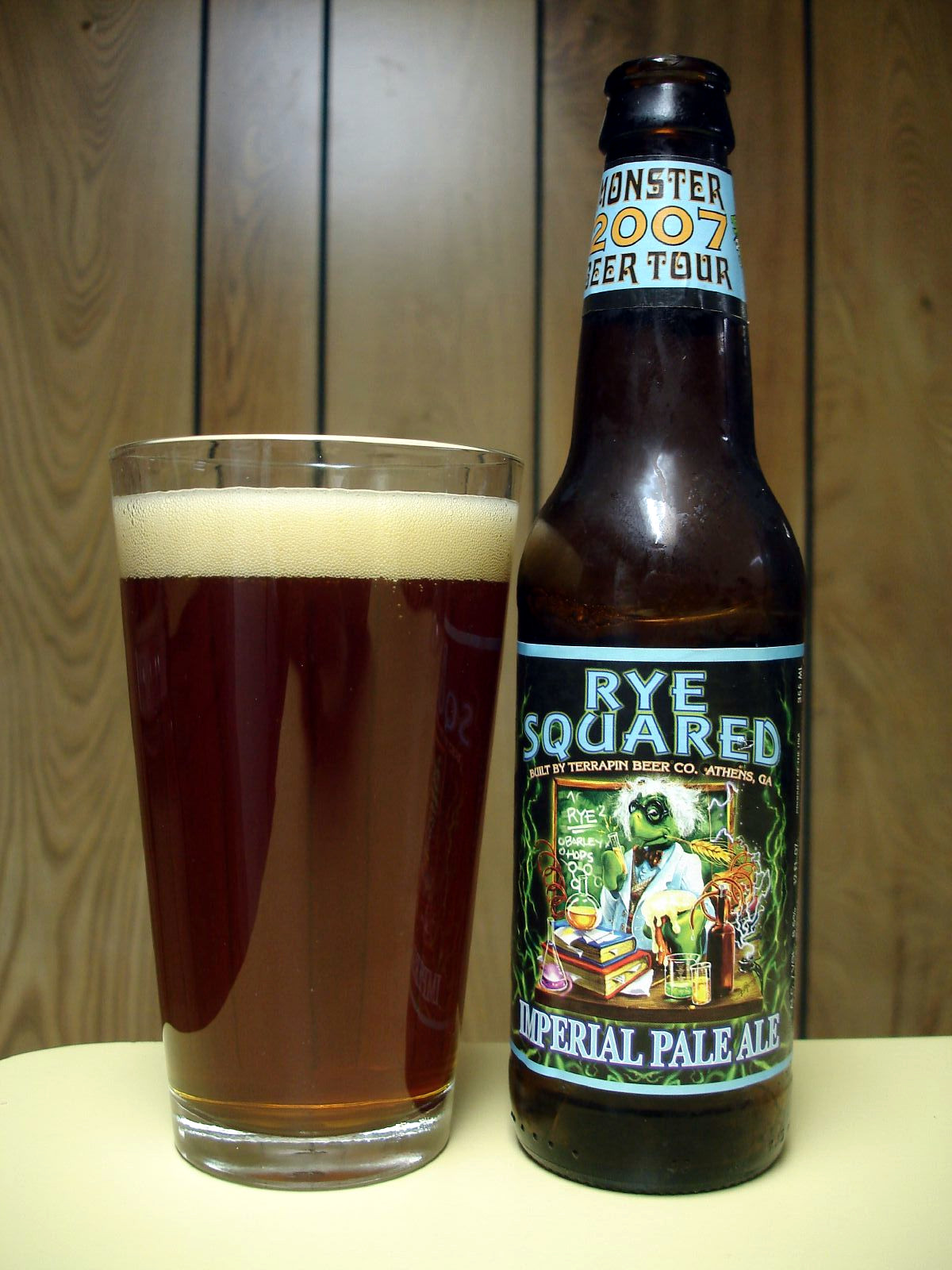
A glass and bottle of rye beer, Imperial Pale Ale. Terrapin Brewing Co. Rye Squared

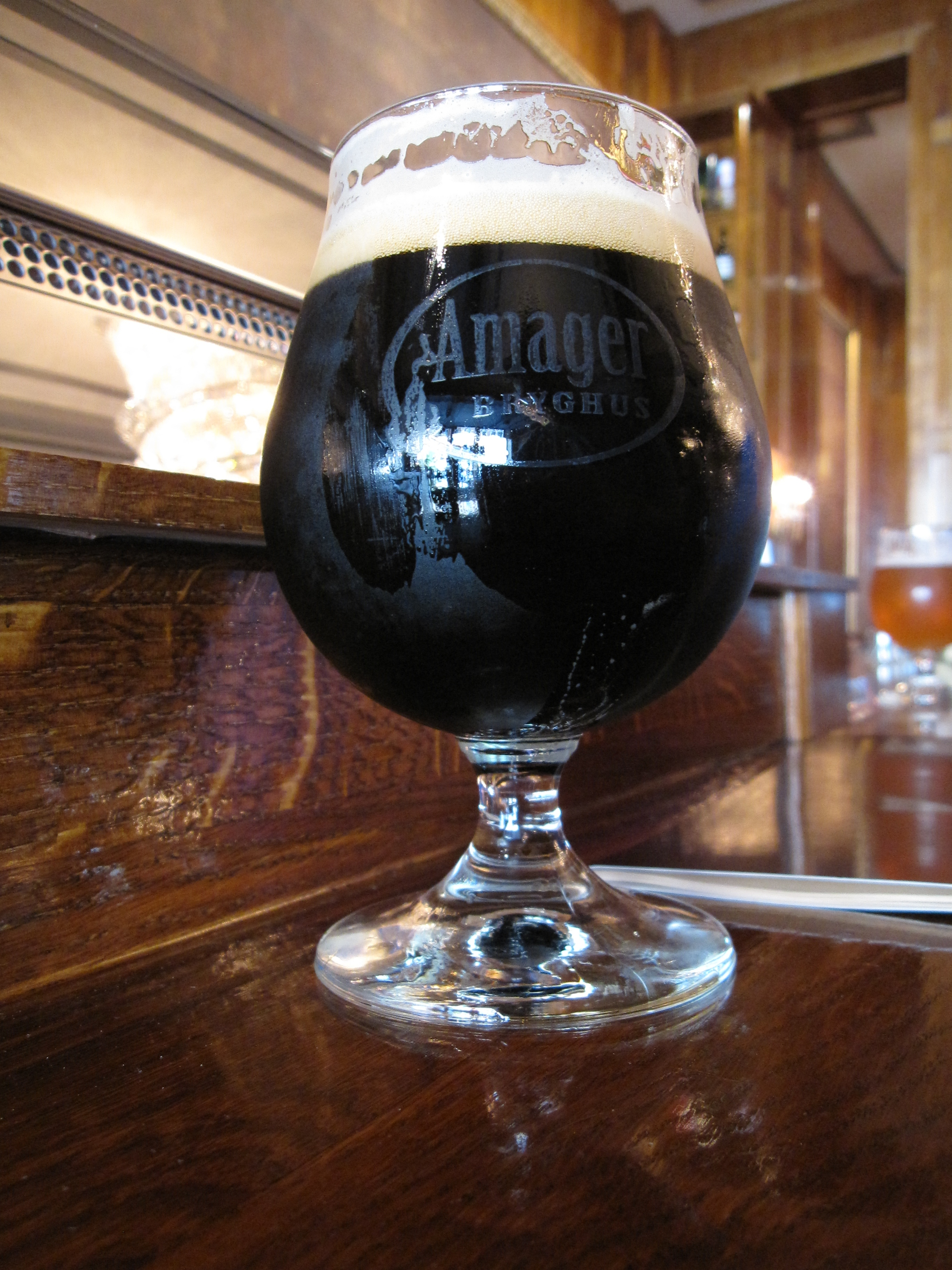
A glass of Amager Ryeporter beer

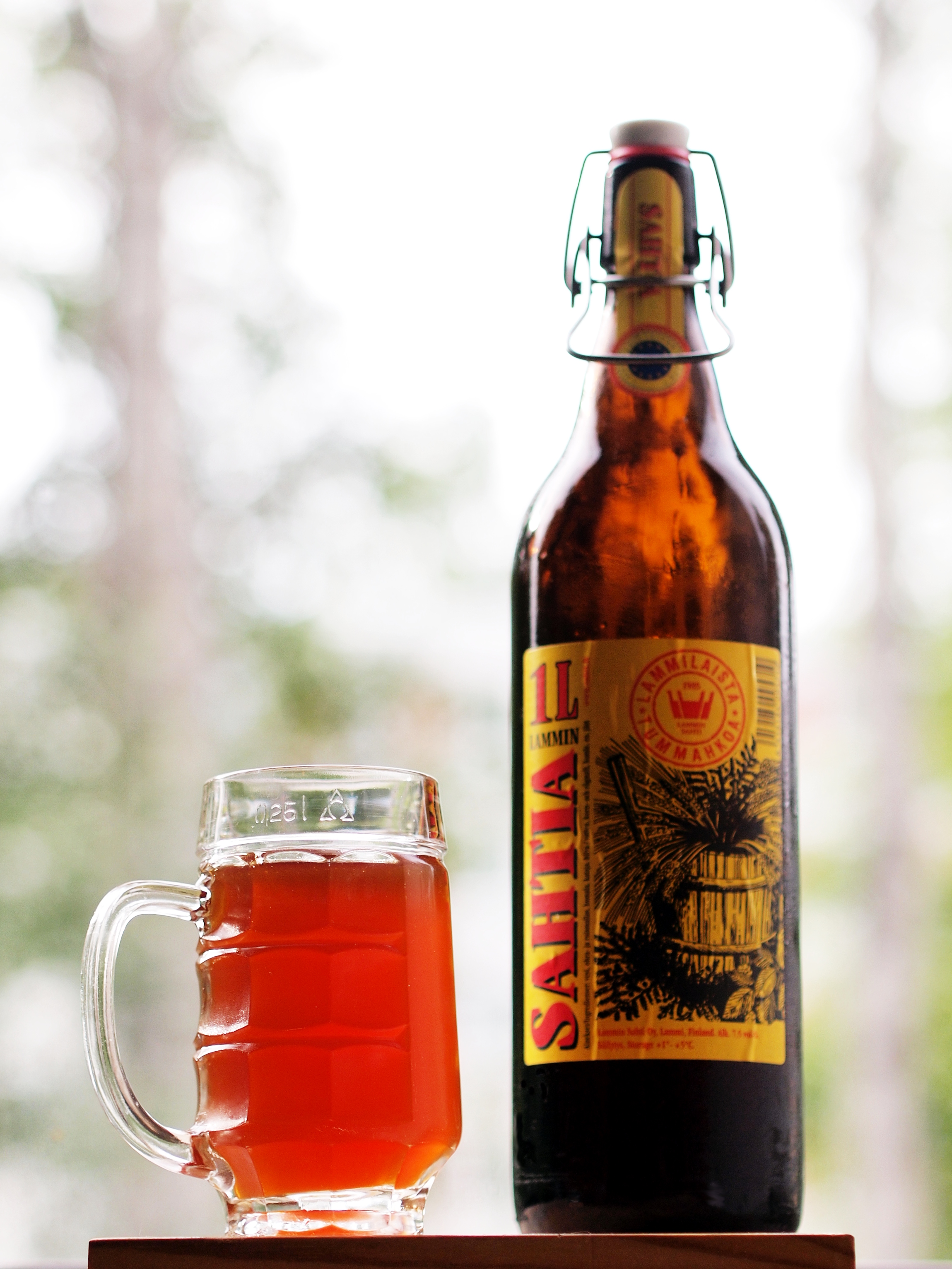
A bottle and a glass of Finnish rye beer from the brand Lammin Sahti

Rye beer is a beer in which rye is substituted for some portion of the malted barley.

Roggenbier is a beer produced with up to 60% rye malt. The style originated in Bavaria, southern Germany, and is brewed with the same type of yeast as a German Hefeweizen, resulting in a similar light, dry, spicy taste.

In the United States, rye beer is produced by homebrewers and microbreweries. In some examples, the hops presence is pushed to the point where they resemble American India pale ales (IPAs). This style is often called a Rye IPA, or "Rye-P-A".

Finnish sahti is produced by brewing rye with juniper berries and baker's yeast

The traditional Slavic kvass is made using rye bread that has been steeped and fermented.

== Roggenbier ==
In Bavaria, rye malt was used for brewing beer until the 15th century. After a period of bad harvests, though, it was ruled that rye would be used only for baking bread, thus only barley was to be used for beer; see the law known as the Reinheitsgebot. Roggenbier disappeared for almost 500 years.

In the late 1980s, the Spezialbrauerei Schierling near Regensburg created the first modern Roggenbier, Schierlinger Roggen, using a modified, patented mashing regimen to cope with the effects of the highly viscous rye wort.

The modern version of Roggenbier is typically about 4.9-5.6% ABV and is fairly dark in colour. The flavour is grainy, often having a hearty flavour similar to pumpernickel bread. Typically, at least 30% of the malts used to make the beer are made from rye. Hop aromas should not be present, and bitterness should be very low (10-15 IBUs).
