= Market Garden Brewery =

Coordinates: 41.4848992°N 81.7036857°W

- Industry: Alcoholic beverage
- Founded: 2011
- Headquarters: 1947 W. 25th Street, Cleveland, OH; United States
- Products: Beer
- Production output: 6,000 BBL (in 2016)
- Website: marketgardenbrewery.com

Market Garden Brewery is a brewery located in the Ohio City neighborhood of Cleveland, Ohio. The brewery, which began as a brewpub in 2011 adjacent to the West Side Market, expanded with the opening of a 35,000 square foot production brewhouse in the Spring of 2016. Market Garden's sister location, Nanobrew, is a smaller brewpub—also located on 25th Street—where the brewery develops most of its recipes for larger scale production. The brewery along with Great Lakes Brewing and the Platform Beer Company, comprises a section of Ohio City that is locally referred to as the Brewing District.
