= Von Ebert Brewing =

Brewery based in Portland, Oregon, U.S.

Coordinates: 45.5271°N 122.5184°W

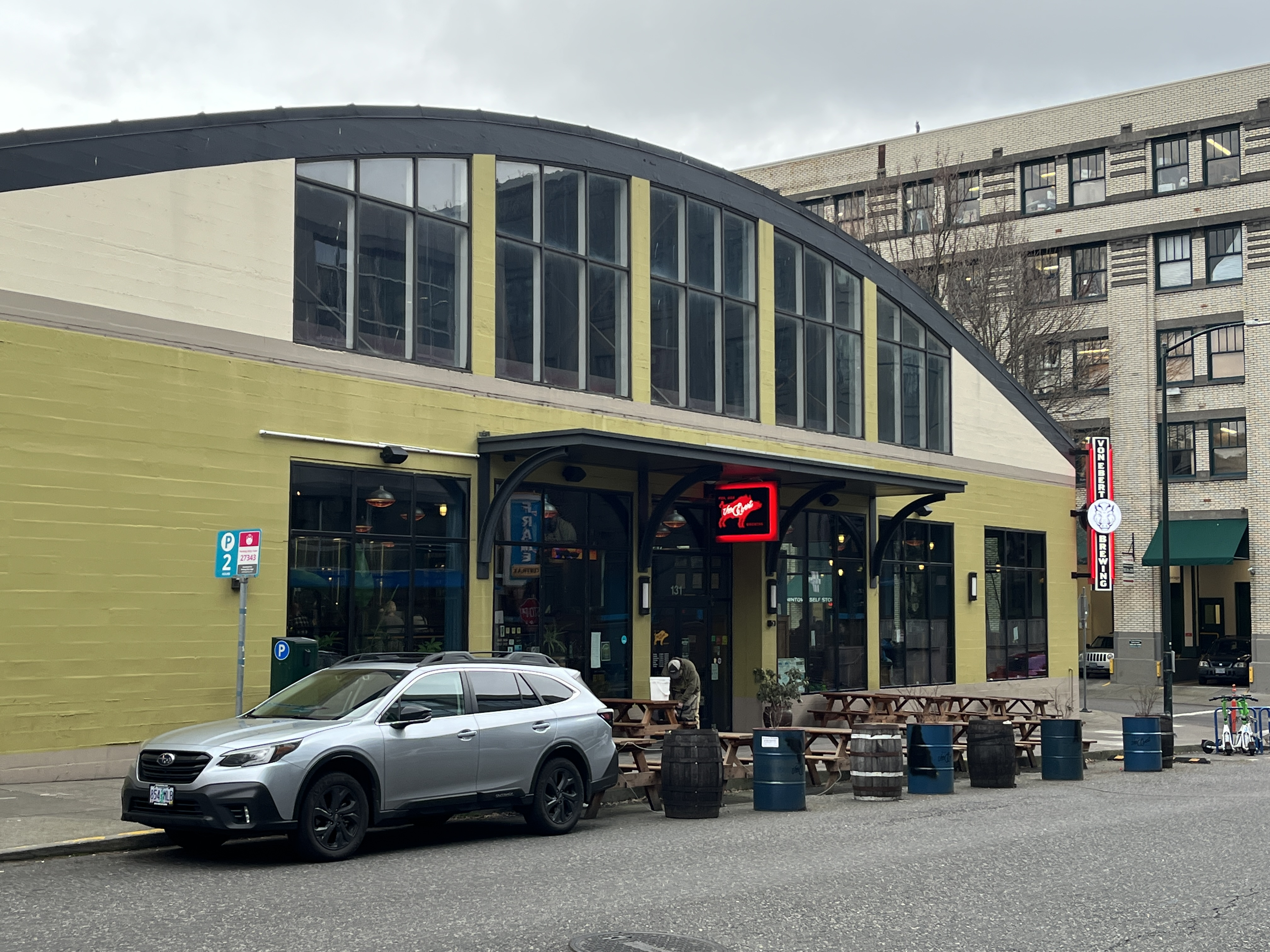
- Exterior of the Pearl District location, 2023
- Interactive map of Von Ebert Brewing

Restaurant information
- Location: Portland, Multnomah, Oregon, United States
- Website: vonebertbrewing.com

Von Ebert Brewing is a brewery based in Portland, Oregon, United States. The business has operated in northwest Portland's Pearl District, at Glendoveer Golf Course in the northeast Portland part of the Hazelwood neighborhood, at Cascade Station in Northeast Portland, and in Beaverton. The Pearl District location closed in April 2024.

== Description ==
The menu has included burgers, smoked wings, pizza, large pretzels served with mustard dip, a Fried Chicken Sando, and a grilled cheese made with gouda. The restaurant has also served bratwurst and pulled pork.

== History ==
Owned by Tom Cook, Von Ebert began operating in northwest Portland's Pearl District in March 2018, as a rebranded Portland location of Fat Head's Brewery. In May 2018, the business confirmed plans to open a second location at Glendoveer Golf Course, in a space which previously housed a RingSide Grill in the northeast Portland part of the Hazelwood neighborhood. The second location opened in July. Von Ebert also operates locations at Cascade Station in northeast Portland and in Beaverton.

Brewers for Von Ebert have included Sean Burke and Sam Pecoraro. In April 2020, during the COVID-19 pandemic, Von Ebert launched a fleet of delivery vehicles. The business participated in the Oregon Brewers Festival in 2022. The Pearl District location closed in April 2024.

Von Ebert has supported a nonprofit organization working to reduce substance addiction and suicide for more than a decade. According to Wine Enthusiast, "The brewery's Diversity, Equity and Inclusion committee teamed with the Oregon Brewers Guild to host the first intern in the state's Mashing Barriers program, increasing underrepresented individuals' access to Oregon's brewing industry." In 2022, the brewery collaborated with Brian Grant to create a specialty beer benefitting a nonprofit dedicated to helping people diagnosed with Parkinson's disease.

In 2025, the business unveiled the largest beer can silo in Oregon.

== Reception ==
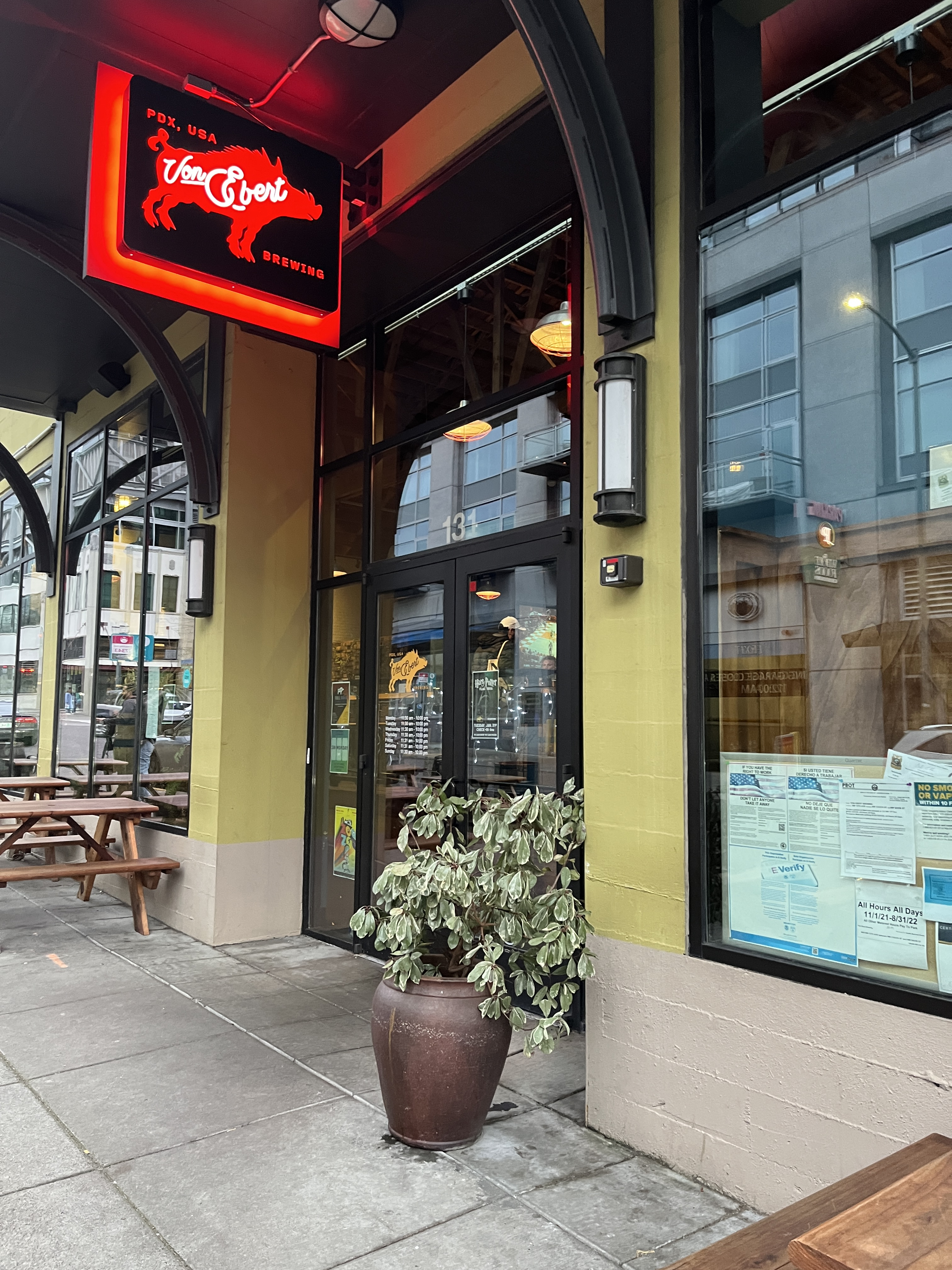
Entrance to the Pearl District location, 2023

In 2022, Beau Eastes of 1859 Oregon's Magazine wrote, "Arguably no craft brewer in Oregon had a better 2021 than Portland-based Von Ebert Brewing. Less than four years old, Von Ebert was named the 2021 Medium Sized Brewery of the Year by the Oregon Beer Awards, claimed gold in the uber-competitive American IPA category at the 2021 Great American Beer Festival with their Volatile Substance IPA, all the while expanding their popular Heritage Beer Series. It's a tough act to follow, but no one’s been as innovative as Von Ebert over the past few years".

Andre Meunier ranked the brewery's Volatile Substance beer number one in The Oregonian's 2019 list of Portland's ten best beers. Volatile Substance was one of two out of hundreds to receive a perfect score in Wine Enthusiast's 2022 blind tastings. The Pils took silver in the Great American Beer Festival's German-Style Pilsener category in 2022. The Islands in the Stream took bronze in the Belgian Beers, German Wheat Beers and Traditional Brett Beers category at the Oregon Beer Awards in 2022.
