= Bessie (lake monster) =

Lake monster in northeastern Michigan folklore

Creature information
- Other name: South Bay Bessie
- Grouping: Lake Monster / Sea Serpent

Origin
- Country: United States, Canada
- Region: Lake Erie
- Details: Found in water

In northeastern Ohio and Michigan folklore, Bessie is a name given to a lake monster in Lake Erie, also known as South Bay Bessie or simply The Lake Erie Monster. The first recorded sighting of Bessie occurred in 1817, and more sightings have occurred intermittently and in greater frequency in the last three decades. Bessie is reported to be snake-like and 30 to 40 ft (9.1 to 12.2 m) long, at least a foot in diameter, with a grayish color.

== Sightings ==
While shooting at ducks north of Sandusky, Ohio, in 1793, the captain of the sloop Bay Rat startled a large creature (snake) described as "more than a rod (16 ½ ft.) in length"

July 1817, the crew of a schooner reported a 30 to 40 ft (9.1 to 12.2 m) long serpent, dark in color.

Later that year, another boat crew spotted a similar animal, this time copper-colored and 60 feet (18 m) in length. This time, they shot at it with muskets, which had no visible effect.

A third 1817 incident took place near Toledo, when French settlers—two brothers named Dusseau—encountered a huge monster on the beach, writhing in what they took to be its death throes. The brothers described it as between 20 and 30 feet (6.1 and 9.1 m) in length and shaped like a large sturgeon, except that it had arms. The panicked brothers fled the scene, and when they returned later, the creature had disappeared, presumably carried off by waves after its death. All that was left of its presence were marks on the beach and a number of silver scales about the size of silver dollars.

An extraordinary sighting which was carried by local newspapers took place by the entire crew of a ship bound from Buffalo, New York, to Toledo, Ohio, in July 1892. The crew (including captain) saw a large area of water about 0.5 miles (0.80 km) ahead of them churned up and foaming. As they approached they saw "a huge sea serpent" that appeared to be "wrestling about in the waters, as if fighting with an unseen foe." They observed as the creature relaxed itself and stretched out full length—estimated at 50 feet (15 m) long and 4 feet (1.2 m) in circumference—with its head sticking up above the water an additional 4 feet (1.2 m). The brownish creature's eyes were described as "viciously sparkling" and large fins were also noted.

Crystal Beach near Fort Erie was the scene of another sighting on May 5, 1896. This time there were four eyewitnesses who watched for 45 minutes as a 30 feet (9.1 m) creature with a dog-shaped head and pointy tail churned up the water as it swam about until finally disappearing before nightfall.

There were some sightings of the alleged monster in 1969, the 1980s and in 1993. Local marina owner Thomas Solberg offered a reward of $5,000 "for anyone who captures South Bay Bessie alive".

== In popular culture ==
- Lemmy (Lake Erie Monster), a wood and plastic sculpture of Bessie created by Len Tieman, was located in the Huron River just north of Ohio Route 2 near Huron in 1994, and could be seen by drivers from the bridge. The sculpture was damaged and has since been removed.
- The minor league hockey team the Cleveland Monsters, AHL affiliate to the NHL's Columbus Blue Jackets, are named after Bessie.
- The Great Lakes Brewing Company, brews and distributes a seasonal South Bay Bessie-inspired India pale ale (IPA) called Lake Erie Monster.
- The Conneaut Arts Center hosts a Lake Erie Monster Festival each summer to celebrate the lore and legend of Bessie.
