= St. John's Episcopal Church (Cleveland) =

Historic church in Ohio, United States

- U.S. National Register of Historic Places
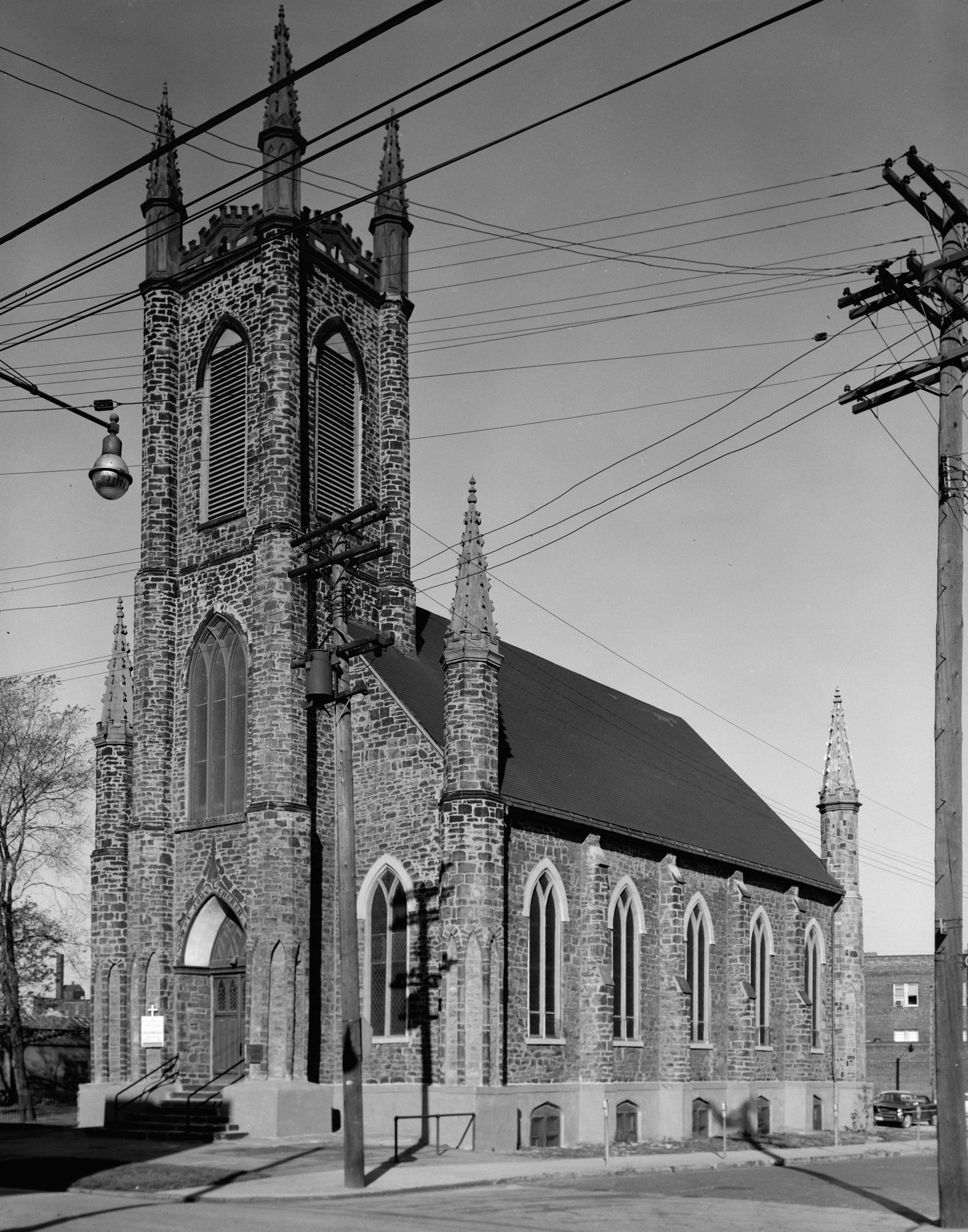
- Front of the church

- Location within Cleveland Location within Ohio Location within the United States
- Location: 2600 Church St., Cleveland, Ohio
- Coordinates: 41°29′24″N 81°42′30″W
- Area: less than one acre
- Built: 1838
- Architect: Hezekiah Eldredge
- Architectural style: Gothic Revival
- NRHP reference No.: 73001418
- Added to NRHP: February 23, 1973

St. John's Episcopal Church is located at 2600 Church Avenue in the Ohio City neighborhood of Cleveland, Ohio. St. John's is the oldest consecrated building in Cuyahoga county. This stone Gothic Revival church building was designed by Hezekiah Eldredge and built beginning in 1836 and was completed 1838. Eldridge was probably familiar with John Henry Hopkins' "An Essay on Gothic Architecture", the first book on Gothic ecclesiastical architecture to be published in the United States. St. John's is a good representative of a small group of American churches inspired by Hopkins' book.

On November 9, 1816, a group of Episcopalians met in the log home of Phineas Shepard on the Cleveland's west side at what is now West 25th Street and Detroit Avenue, to organize what was to become Trinity Parish. The parish is the site of the original Episcopal congregation in Cleveland. In 1825, east side members moved the original parish, named Trinity from Ohio City, to a site near Public Square. West side members remained in Ohio City, naming the new parish St. John's.

Trinity Cathedral is now the seat of the Episcopal Diocese of Ohio. St. John's was also the mother church to several of the west side parishes.

In 1837, the Ohio City Directory described the church as follows, "The Episcopal Church, which is not yet finished, is built of hammered stone, and has a lofty steeple. Its style of architecture is Gothic, resembling that of the ancient and venerable Cathedral. This building, when finished, will be one of the best of the kind in the western country, and may be considered as an ornament to the young city".

The original bell (1846) now is housed in the west side of the narthex, due to weakening of the steeple. Next to the church stands the frame gothic revival Parish Hall is circa (1875).

This "Gothicized meeting house" has been rebuilt twice, once after a fire in the 1880s and once after a tornado in 1953. The present plan, with neither a central aisle nor an apse, is therefore similar to the original plan. At one time the church was more elaborate than it is today; the church pinnacles no longer exist. St. John's was known as "Station Hope" on the Underground Railroad.

An Episcopal parish continued to worship in this space through December, 2007; and the building remains property of the Diocese. Currently, social justice events, guest speakers and meetings also occur at the church.

== Noted members ==
- William B. Castle: Cleveland mayor
- Mark Hanna: industrialist and Republican politician from Cleveland.
- Hezekiah Eldredge: builder, charter member and was a member of the Vestry.
