= Entrepreneurs for Sustainability =

Business network in the United States

Entrepreneurs for Sustainability, abbreviated as E4S, is a business network in the Greater Cleveland area oriented towards sustainability and entrepreneurship. The organization was founded in 2000 by Holly Harlan, owner of a business consulting firm in Cleveland Heights, with the goal of encouraging economic development and startup businesses oriented towards positive change and addressing environmental issues. Meetings are hosted by Great Lakes Brewing Company. The organization is growing, with 5800 members in 2008.

Sustainability-oriented startup companies associated with the group include BioDiesel Cleveland, Sustainable Solutions, a green building consultant firm, and Good Nature, a sustainability-focused lawn care service. Non-profit organizations associated with the group include EcoCity Cleveland (which has merged into the Cleveland Museum of Natural History as the GreenCityBlueLake Institute), Green Energy Ohio, and the Cleveland Green Building Coalition.

The organization awards a "Champions of Sustainability" award to regional leaders who have implemented principles of sustainability.

== Services and programs ==
In addition to their regular monthly meetings, Entrepreneurs for Sustainability provides a number of services to its members. One such program is called the Sustainability Implementation Group, which is oriented towards small and medium businesses, and gets companies to visit each other's facilities and learn about new technologies, with one goal being the formation of new revenue streams associated with sustainability. The group also received grant money in 2004 from the state of Ohio to hold workshops on energy efficiency in counties throughout northeast Ohio. In 2006, the organization received $20,000 from the Burton D. Morgan Foundation to build and strengthen its programs.
