= Hezekiah Eldredge =

American architect

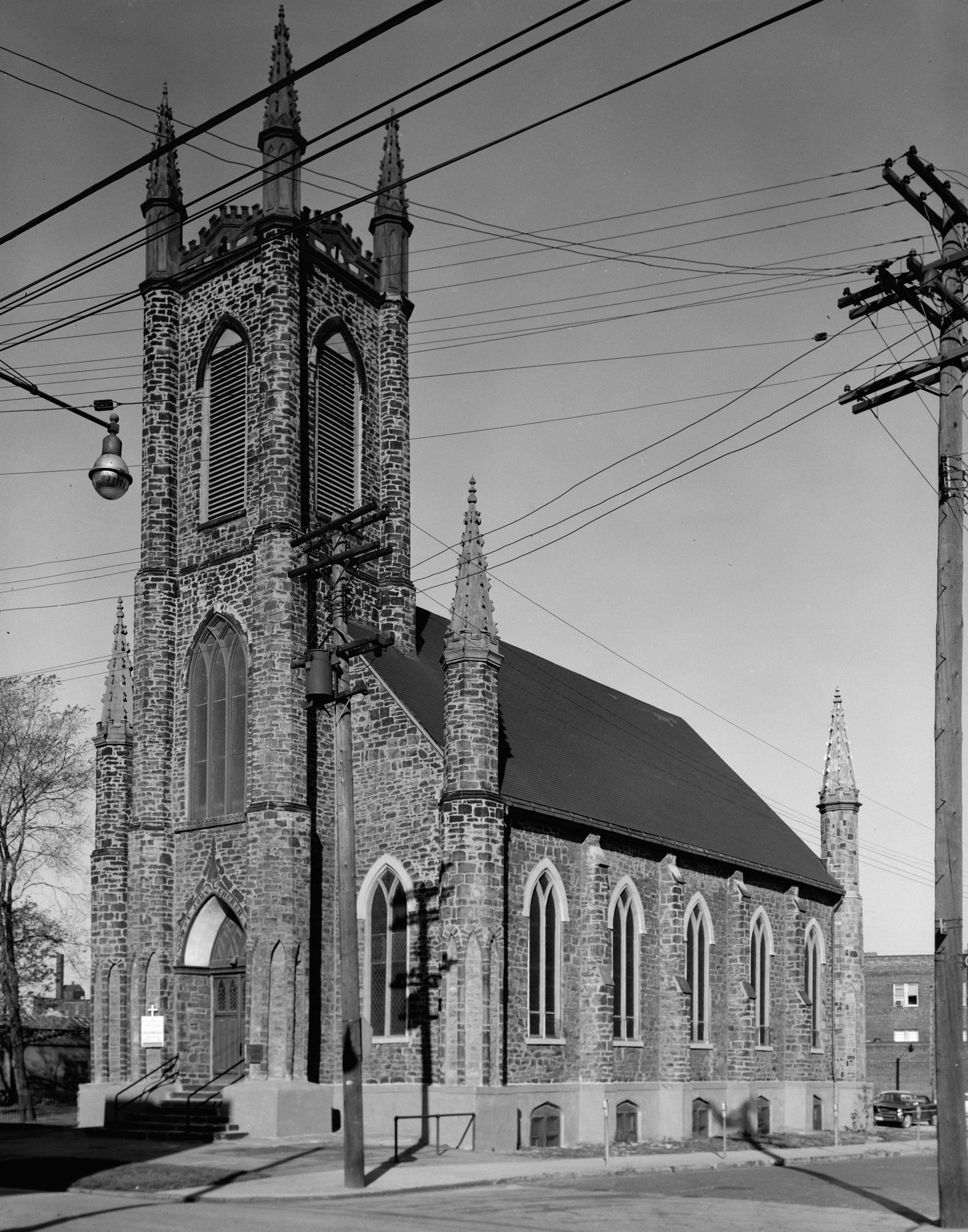
St. John's Episcopal Church, Cleveland, designed and built by Hezekiah Eldredge

Hezekiah Eldredge (April 3, 1795 – August 25, 1845) was an early American architect. Born in South Mansfield, Connecticut, he moved to New York then on to Cleveland, Ohio. He became known as a fine carpenter and because of his skills later turned to building design and contracting. In Rochester, he completed the Batavia Club in 1831. Moving to Cleveland, he began building St. John's Episcopal Church in 1836, which he completed in 1838. Eldridge was a charter member of St. John's and a member of the Vestry.

Eldredge was probably familiar with John Henry Hopkins' An Essay on Gothic Architecture, the first book on Gothic ecclesiastical architecture to be published in the United States. St. John's is a good representative of a small group of American churches inspired by Hopkins' book.

Eldredge died in Cleveland in 1845.

== Works ==
In addition to St. John's he has been credited with:

- Batavia Club (1831)
- The Ohio City Exchange (1835)
- The Cleveland Center Block (1836)
- The Baptist Meeting House (1836)
- The Pearl Street House (1837)
