= Parker Bosley =

American chef

Parker Bosley (born 1938) is an American chef and local food advocate.

== Early life ==
Bosley grew up on a Trumbull County dairy farm.

== Career ==
He ran the eponymous restaurant Parker's New American Bistro in Ohio City, recognized twice by Gourmet magazine as one of America's 50 best restaurants.

Bosley was a local food pioneer in the 1980s before its popularity increased.
