= Jackie O's Pub & Brewery =

Craft brewery in Ohio, United States

- Opened: 2005
- Key people: Art Oestrike; Brad Clark
- Website: http://jackieos.com/

Active beers
| Name | Type |
| Mystic Mama | IPA |
| Chomolungma | Brown ale |
| Firefly | Amber ale |
| Razz Wheat | Wheat beer |
| Hop Ryot | Rye IPA |

Jackie O's Pub & Brewery, often abbreviated to Jackie O's, is a craft brewery located in Athens, Ohio. Founded in 2005, its beer has been internationally recognized. Its business practices place emphasis on benefiting the local community by buying local foods, using renewable energy sources, and encouraging tourism to the city where it was founded.

== History ==
Jackie O's was founded in 2005 by Brad Clark and Art Oestrike, both alumni of Ohio University, which is also located in Athens. The name "Jackie O's" was chosen to pay homage to the Irish-inspired brewpub that occupied the building before its purchase, as well as in honor of Oestrike's mother Jackie, who died shortly after they purchased the premises. Oestrike is the owner of Jackie O's, while Clark's role is head brewer. Their first location only had two fermentors, limiting their output to approximately 300 barrels annually. In 2009, Jackie O's acquired the bar immediately adjacent to theirs, calling it Jackie O’s Public House. They used the larger kitchen of the Public House to expand their menu offerings, and they also had the space to increase their brewing capacity. Annual beer production rose from 300 barrels to 800 barrels. In 2013, Jackie O's expanded their business to another location in the city of Athens. The new location was primarily a production facility, increasing their output from 800 barrels to 3,200 barrels annually. From 2013 to 2017, their annual growth rate exceeded 20%.

At around 6:30 p.m. on Tuesday, November 4, 2025, a grease fire broke out in the kitchen of the restaurant. The fire caused "extensive" damage and required the use of several forced entry tools to be fully extenguished. Smoke damage from the fire also affected nearby apartments and the next-door bar, The Union. ^{[25]} There were no injuries. A reopening date was not initially announced for Jackie O's.

== Beers ==
Jackie O's Pub & Brewery has several "flagship" beers that are consistently available year-round, including a raspberry-flavored wheat beer ("Razz Wheat"), an amber ale ("Firefly"), a honey nut brown ale ("Chomolungma"), an IPA ("Mystic Mama"), and a rye IPA ("Hop Ryot"). In 2008, Jackie O's gained the capacity to begin brewing barrel-aged beers. In 2017, Jackie O's launched into production of sour beers with a designated brewing space constructed for the expansion. In 2017, Clark described their current output composition as 50–60% IPAs. "Mystic Mama" is their most popular beer, followed by "Razz Wheat." Jackie O's barrel-aged beers have attracted a wide following, with Hop Culture website calling them "one of the greatest producers of barrel-aged stouts...in the country" and Paste magazine saying "we’ve yet to have a barrel-aged beer from them that wasn’t impressive."

=== Distribution ===
Jackie O's began canning its beers for distribution in 2013, starting with "Firefly Amber" and "Chomolungma." They were the second craft beer brewery in Ohio to begin canning, after MadTree Brewing Company. Jackie O's brewed 13,000 barrels of beer in 2016 and planned on brewing 17,000 barrels in 2017. As of 2017, 97% of all beer produced by Jackie O's was sold in the State of Ohio. Their distribution currently includes a few counties in Kentucky. Oestrike and Clark have expressed interest in containing their growth mostly to the State of Ohio. Clark stated, "Staying within the state is sustainable. There’s a reduced carbon footprint but there’s also keeping money within the state, whether it’s going to the distributor or the retailer, the consumer is spending their money in Ohio and we’re bringing people in from outside of Ohio. It’s building and strengthening everything around us and within us." Oestrike and Clark estimate that the sale of Jackie O's beer creates at least $550-$600,000 (USD) annually for the State of Ohio via sales tax.

=== Awards and recognition ===
In 2015, Jackie O's won several awards at the Dublin Craft Beer Cup, an international competition, taking a silver medal for their "Rum Barrel Oil of Aphrodite" and a bronze medal for "Bourbon Barrel Dark Apparition." In 2017, Jackie O's was ranked as RateBeer's best pub in Ohio, best taproom in Ohio, and top brewery in Ohio. One of Jackie O's beers—its Iced Coffee Apparition, an imperial stout aged on ground coffee beans—was ranked as RateBeer's best beer in Ohio in 2017. Paste magazine named Jackie O's as one of their top 10 breweries of 2017. In 2018, Jackie O's was one of two Ohio breweries included on RateBeer's list of 100 best breweries in the world. Also in 2018, Thrillist listed Jackie O's as the best craft brewery in Ohio.

Jackie O's beer has received positive reviews from online publications, with "Mystic Mama" placing in Draft magazine's top 50 IPAs in the United States, "Pockets of Sunlight" ranking #3 in Paste's list of 116 best saisons, and "Spirit Beast" ranking #2 on Paste's list of 144 best barrel-aged imperial stouts.

== The Union Street Fire and aftermath ==
In November 2014, Jackie O's sustained heavy damages in the Union Street Fire, losing the roof of one of its properties. Jackie O's Public House, its 2009 acquisition, remained standing, but had severe smoke and water damage. Though Clark initially expressed fears that the Public House would have to be condemned, the building was able to be rehabilitated. The Public House reopened with limited business hours less than a month later, though it was unable to serve hot food due to extensive kitchen damage. Clark expressed gratitude that the fire did not do more damage, stating that if the brewpub (the initial location) had been destroyed "we would’ve never reopened either spot.” The Public House resumed normal operating hours with a fully operational kitchen shortly after April 2016.

The Union Street Fire resulted in approximately 70 lost jobs in total due to destroyed and damaged businesses, including more than 40 employees of Jackie O's.

== Business practices ==
Jackie O's receives about half of its energy from solar panels installed at its brewery. Of the renewable energy investment, Oestrike said, "Our eventual goal is 100 percent sustainability." They also support the consumption of local food, and sell several food products in their establishments from farms within 30 mi (48 km) of the city of Athens. Jackie O's is the owner of Barrel Ridge Farm, one of the local farms that supplies produce for their food menu. Jackie O's produces most of the baked goods sold as part of their menu offerings at their Public House, such as pizza crusts and hamburger buns. Baked goods are created with the spent grain byproduct of their brewing operation. Other spent grain byproduct is turned into mulch for Barrel Ridge Farm so that none of it is wasted.

Jackie O's flagship beer can labels are designed by local artist Bryn Perrott (known professionally as "deerjerk") from Morgantown, West Virginia.

=== Relationship with the community ===
Former mayor of Athens Steve Patterson spoke highly of the brewery, saying, “In terms of economic impact, Jackie O’s is a heavy lifter in the city. They’re an integral part of Athens, not only in what they’re producing, but in creating jobs. They’ve created more than 100 jobs as they’ve grown.” Jackie O's is in the top 10 employers in the county by number of employees. In 2016, they had 127 employees, 64 of which were full-time. While their "flagship" beers are widely-available in the state of Ohio, Jackie O's periodically has limited-edition bottle releases available only at the brewery itself to spur tourism to the city.

Oestrike has used his platform as an entrepreneur to be an instructor at Ohio University. He has taught Business Relations and Communication Skills, where students learn how to work together and create solutions to real-world problems. Jackie O's has also been in talks with Ohio University to host a brewing science course, though this has yet to transpire.

== See also ==
- Barrel-aged beer
