= Rye IPA =

A glass and bottle of Rich & Dan's Rye IPA by Harpoon Brewery

Rye India pale ale is a style of rye beer with a strong hoppy character, comparable to India pale ale. In this beer style, malted rye grains in the mash ingredients add a tangy or spicy character to the beer.

== History ==
Rye was a traditional brewing grain for many eastern European breweries, and grew in popularity among American craft brewers near the end of the 20th century. Although it is popular, the history of the Rye IPA is indeed unclear, and no single brewery can be definitively credited with its creation.

== Popularity ==
Within the American craft beer market, IPAs are one of the most popular categories. Within that category, rye IPAs are growing in popularity because of the different taste profiles they bring. They allow breweries that are known for their IPAs to increase the variety of styles they brew. The increase in popularity of rye beers was paralleled by an increase in the popularity of rye whiskey.

== Brewing with rye ==
Rye is a grain used in addition to the other malted grains, typically barley, in the ingredients during the mashing process. Rye can be difficult to brew with because of its high beta-glucan content. This makes the filtration of the wort more difficult than usual. Rye is commonly added to beer for its complex, crisp, distinctive, spicy flavor and sometimes adds a reddish color to the beer.
