= Platform Beer Company =

Beer manufacturer in Cleveland, Ohio

Coordinates: 41.479836°N 81.7161623°W

- Type: Subsidiary
- Industry: Alcoholic beverage
- Founded: 2014
- Founders: Paul Benner; Justin Carson
- Headquarters: 4125 Lorain Avenue, Ohio City, Cleveland, Ohio, United States
- Key people: Shaun Yasaki, Reed Jaskula (brewmasters)
- Products: Beer
- Production output: 10,000 BBL (2016)
- Parent: Anheuser-Busch InBev
- Website: platformbeer.co

Platform Beer Company was a beer manufacturer in the Ohio City neighborhood of Cleveland, Ohio. The brand is owned by Anheuser-Busch InBev.

== History ==
Platform Beer began as a collaboration between Paul Brenner, a homebrew supply store owner, and Justin Carson, owner of a draft line servicing company. The Lorain Avenue brewpub, which opened to the public in 2014, occupied a building that previously housed part of the Leisy Brewing Company (est. 1873). Besides its primary aim of producing beer for the Northeast Ohio market, Platform's secondary mission was to educate and facilitate brewing education in the Greater Cleveland area. In addition to its availability on draught in local bars and in cans via retail, Platform's beers were also served in Progressive Field and FirstEnergy Stadium. In 2016, Platform procured a building in Columbus, Ohio, where a second brewpub opened.

On Wednesday, February 22, 2023, the doors of the taprooms were closed for the last time.
