= Great Lakes Brewing Company =

Craft brewery and brewpub in Ohio, US

Coordinates: 41.4843807°N 81.7045187°W

- Industry: Alcoholic beverage
- Founded: 1988
- Headquarters: 2516 Market Avenue; Cleveland, Ohio; United States
- Products: Beer
- Owners: Patrick and Daniel Conway
- Website: www.greatlakesbrewing.com

Great Lakes Brewing Company is a brewery and brewpub in Cleveland, Ohio. The first brewpub and microbrewery in the state, Great Lakes Brewing has been noted as important to Cleveland's local identity and as one of the initial forces behind the revival of the Ohio City neighborhood on the near West Side. In 2015, it was the 21st-largest craft brewery by volume and the 28th-largest overall brewery in the United States. The company was established in 1988 by brothers Patrick and Daniel Conway, both St. Edward High School graduates, in Cleveland's Ohio City neighborhood, located near St. Ignatius High School and the West Side Market. The brewpub and restaurant remain in their original locations, while production has expanded to adjacent properties.

The present site allows visitors to consume a glass of beer in the original brewpub which features a Tiger Mahogany bar from the 1860s, a Beer Cellar and the Rockefeller Room, named after Standard Oil founder and Clevelander John D. Rockefeller, who was thought to have worked in the building. There is a gift shop selling beer, along with apparel and barware. Tours are available on the weekends. Since its inception, Great Lakes has also served as an incubator for Northeast Ohio brewers, with brewmasters at nearby Market Garden and Goldhorn Brewery in the St. Clair-Superior neighborhood both being alumni of Great Lakes.

== Distribution ==
As of 2023, Great Lakes' products are heavily distributed in Cleveland and Northeast Ohio. They can be found in Columbus, Cincinnati, Toledo, Detroit, Chicago, Southeast Michigan, Indiana, and west to Minnesota and Wisconsin, south to Kentucky, North Carolina, Virginia, and West Virginia, and east to Syracuse, New York, New Jersey, Pennsylvania, Maryland, and Washington, D.C., with the New York City market added in October 2023.

== Beers ==
=== Year-round ===
Beer	Pack	% ABV	IBU	Description
Dortmunder Gold Lager	6, 12, 15 (bottles, 12 oz. & 19.2 oz. cans)	5.8	30	An award-winning Dortmunder-style lager, which was originally named "The Heisman" after the famous football player and Cleveland native. It is GLBC's first beer, as well as the brewery's best seller.
Cold Rush Premium Light Lager	12 (12 oz. cans)	4.0	N/A	A light, easy-drinking lager, with 100 calories per 12 ounces.
Midwest IPA	6, 12 (12 oz. & 19.2 oz. cans)	7.0	45	An India pale ale with a "sensible" amount of hops, marketed as the "unofficial IPA of Midwest Nice."
Midwest Hazy IPA	6 (12 oz. cans)	6.5	40	A hazy India pale ale with a "sensible" amount of hops.
Vibacious Double IPA	6 (12 oz. & 19.2 oz cans)	9.0	40	A smooth and hoppy double India pale ale.
Juicy Vibacious Double IPA	6 (12 oz. & 19.2 oz cans)	9.5	40	A juicy and smooth double India pale ale.
Edmund Fitzgerald Porter	6, 12 (bottles, 12 oz. cans)	6.0	37	A porter named for the SS Edmund Fitzgerald, which frequented Cleveland ports and sank in 1975 with many Northeastern Ohioans aboard. Edmund Fitzgerald Porter is often named in the Beer Judge Certification Program (BJCP) as the most stylistically correct representative of a porter within the porter category.
Commodore Perry IPA	6, 12 (bottles, 12 oz. cans)	7.7	70	A British-style India pale ale named in honor of American naval officer Commodore Oliver Hazard Perry, whose contributions in the War of 1812 include the Battle of Lake Erie.
Eliot Ness Amber Lager	6, 12 (bottles, 12 oz. cans)	6.1	27	An amber lager named after Eliot Ness, the famed prohibition agent and eventual Director of Public Safety in Cleveland. Ness frequented a tavern that is now the site of the GLBC brewpub, which also has a connection to the Conway family: GLBC co-founders Pat and Dan's mother served as one of Ness's stenographers during his time in Cleveland.

=== Seasonal ===
Beer	Pack	% ABV	IBU	Availability	Description
Conway's Irish Ale	6, 12 (bottles, 12 oz. cans)	6.3	25	January	An Irish ale brewed in celebration of Saint Patrick's Day and named after Patrick Conway, a Cleveland policeman who directed traffic for 25 years near the brewery and the grandfather of brewery owners Patrick and Daniel Conway.
Conway's Irish Stout	6 (12 oz. cans)	4.8	40	January	An Irish stout named after Patrick Conway.
Easy Buckets Blonde	12 (12 oz. & 19.2 oz. cans)	4.5	10	January	A blonde beer with a smooth finish, brewed as part of GLBC's partnership with the Cleveland Cavaliers. Available at all Cavaliers home games at Rocket Mortgage FieldHouse and at retailers within the Cavaliers' broadcast footprint.
Bourbon Barrel Imperial Porter	4 (16 oz. cans)	12.5	N/A	March	An imperial porter aged in bourbon barrels.
Strawberry Pineapple Wheat	6 (12 oz. cans)	5.5	17	March	A wheat ale brewed with strawberry and pineapple.
Blackout Stout Imperial Stout	4 (bottles)	9.9	50	April	An imperial stout brewed in commemoration of the 2003 Northeast blackout.
Mexican Lager with Lime	6, 12 (12 oz. cans)	5.4	20	April	A Mexican-style lager brewed with lime.
Bourbon Barrel Rye	4 (16 oz. cans)	11.6	N/A	May	A rye ale aged in bourbon barrels.
Rocket Pop Hard Seltzer	6 (12 oz. cans)	5.0	N/A	June	A hard seltzer flavored with cherry, lime, and blue raspberry, inspired by the classic Bomb Pop frozen confection. Available exclusively at the GLBC gift shop and at select retailers in the greater Cleveland area.
73 Kolsch	12 (12 oz. & 19.2 oz. cans)	5.7	20	July	A kolsch-style ale brewed in collaboration with former Cleveland Browns offensive tackle Joe Thomas. Available exclusively at the GLBC gift shop and at select retailers in the greater Cleveland area.
Oktoberfest	6, 12 (bottles, 12 oz. cans)	6.5	20	August	GLBC's interpretation of this Bavarian festival's namesake Märzenbier, a tribute to Cleveland's German heritage.
Cran Orange Wheat	6 (12 oz. cans)	5.5	17	September	A wheat ale brewed with cranberry and orange.
Cookie Exchange Milk Stout	6 (12 oz. cans)	5.5	15	October	A milk stout flavored with peanut butter and chocolate, with a rotating cookie-inspired flavor (2024 flavor: peanut butter blossom).
Christmas Ale	6, 12 (bottles, 12 oz. & 16 oz. cans)	7.5	30	October	An ale brewed with spices and honey. Introduced in 1992 and available exclusively during the holiday season, it is consistently GLBC's second-biggest seller. Christmas Ale's popularity and cult status have been officially recognized in recent years by GLBC with a "first pour" celebration at the GLBC brewpub, held annually in late October.
Barrel Aged Christmas Ale	4 (16 oz. cans)	8.0	30	October	GLBC's bestselling Christmas Ale aged for six months in bourbon barrels.
Barrel Aged Blackout Stout	4 (16 oz. cans)	12.5	50	November	An imperial stout brewed in commemoration of the 2003 Northeast blackout, aged in bourbon barrels.

=== Double Feature IPA series ===
Launched in 2024, GLBC's Double Feature IPA series consists of four high-alcohol content double IPAs.

Beer	Pack	% ABV	IBU	Availability	Description
Chillwave Double IPA	6 (12 oz. cans)	9.0	80	January	A double India pale ale named as a tribute to Lake Erie surfers.
Return of the Lake Erie Monster Double IPA	6 (12 oz. cans)	9.5	65	April	A double IPA named for Bessie, the monster allegedly living in Lake Erie.
Spacewalker Hazy Double IPA	6 (12 oz. cans)	8.0	70	June	A hazy double IPA.
Nosferatu Double Red IPA	6 (12 oz. cans)	8.0	70	August	A red double IPA named after the 1922 German film Nosferatu.

=== Variety packs ===
A 12-can "Mix Pack" variety pack is available year-round. The spring/summer version contains three cans each of Strawberry Pineapple Wheat, Eliot Ness Amber Lager, Cold Rush Light Lager, and Midwest IPA.

A "Hop Madness" IPA variety pack containing three cans each of Midwest Hazy IPA, Midwest IPA, Vibacious Double IPA, and a variety pack exclusive Small Batch IPA is available. A Holiday Pack containing six cans each of Christmas Ale and Cookie Exchange Milk Stout is available during the holiday season.

Other packs, which include the long-established Burning River Pale Ale, are available certain months of the year.

=== Pub exclusives ===
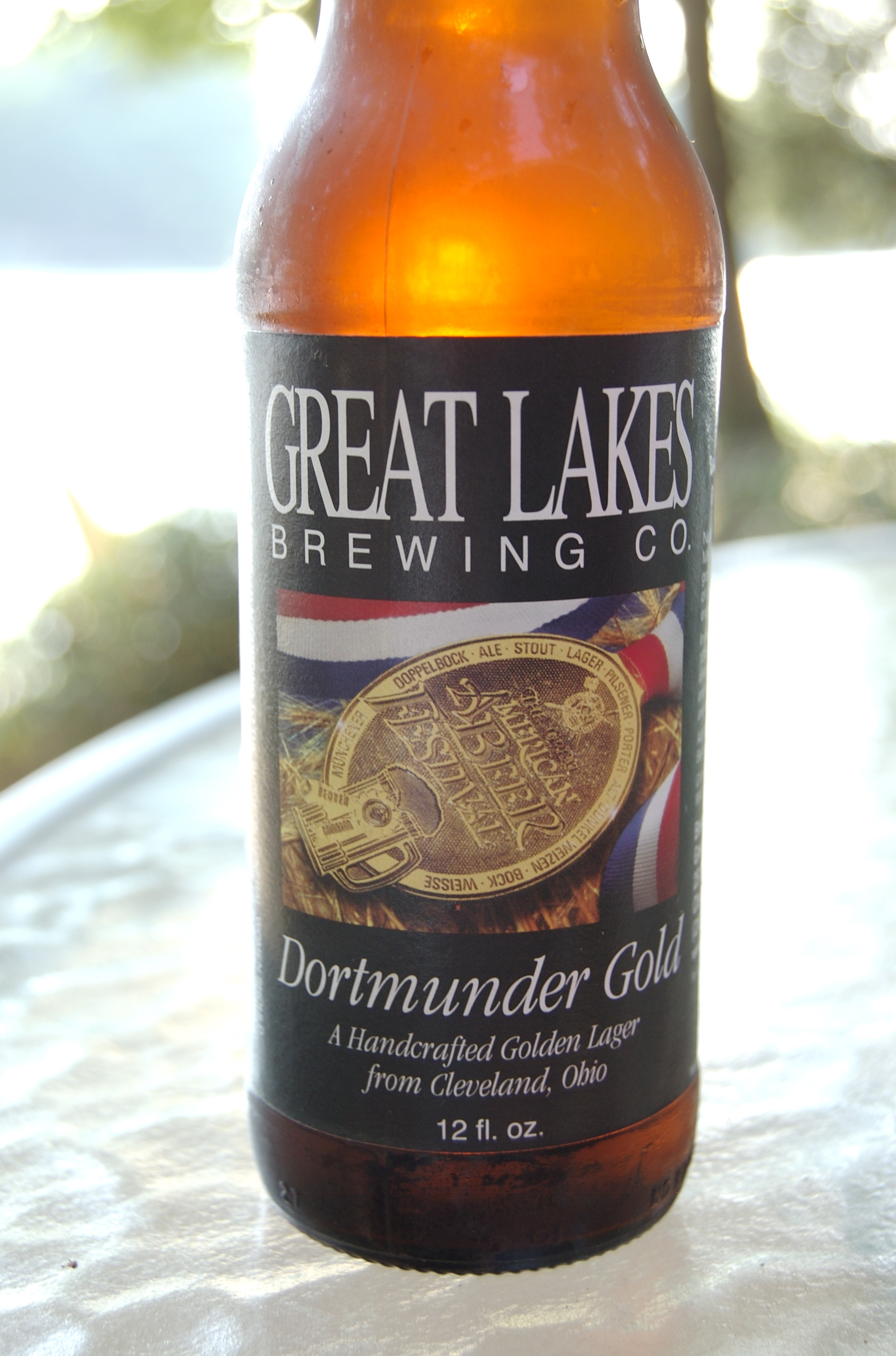
A bottle of Great Lakes Dortmunder Gold pale lager beer

GLBC brews many beers which are only available at their brewpub and restaurant. In some instances, beers that were formerly available throughout the brewery's distribution footprint (e.g., Holy Moses White Ale, Turntable Pils) are withdrawn from wide circulation and made available only at the brewpub.

== Sustainability ==
Great Lakes Brewing Company has undertaken a number of initiatives to promote sustainability, including recycling promotional materials to create fuel for heating an outdoor structure, the use of straw-bale construction (incidentally the first straw-bale structure in Cleveland), the composting of leftovers from the brewery's restaurant, and the use of local and organic food. The brewery also provides barley left over from the brewing process to local farmers for use as feed and to local bakers who use it to produce bread and pretzels. In addition, the delivery trucks are equipped to use biodiesel and are fueled with left-over vegetable oil from the restaurant. The brewery uses solar panels placed on the roof to preheat the water they use to brew beer. And during the colder months, they use outside air for cooling, rather than conventional refrigeration units. The organization is growing, with 5800 members in 2008.

Great Lakes Brewing Company also hosts the meetings of Entrepreneurs for Sustainability, a business network in the Greater Cleveland area focusing on sustainability and entrepreneurship. The brewery has set up displays at a number of sustainability-oriented events, including a 2006 "greener living fair" at Ohio State University, and the "green pavilion" of the 2009 Cleveland Home and Garden Show at the I-X Center.

== Sports affiliations ==
GLBC has been the official craft brewery of the Cleveland Cavaliers of the National Basketball Association (NBA) since 2022. GLBC was formerly the official craft brewery of the Cleveland Indians/Guardians of Major League Baseball (MLB) from 2019–2023.
