= Lists of food and beverage topics =

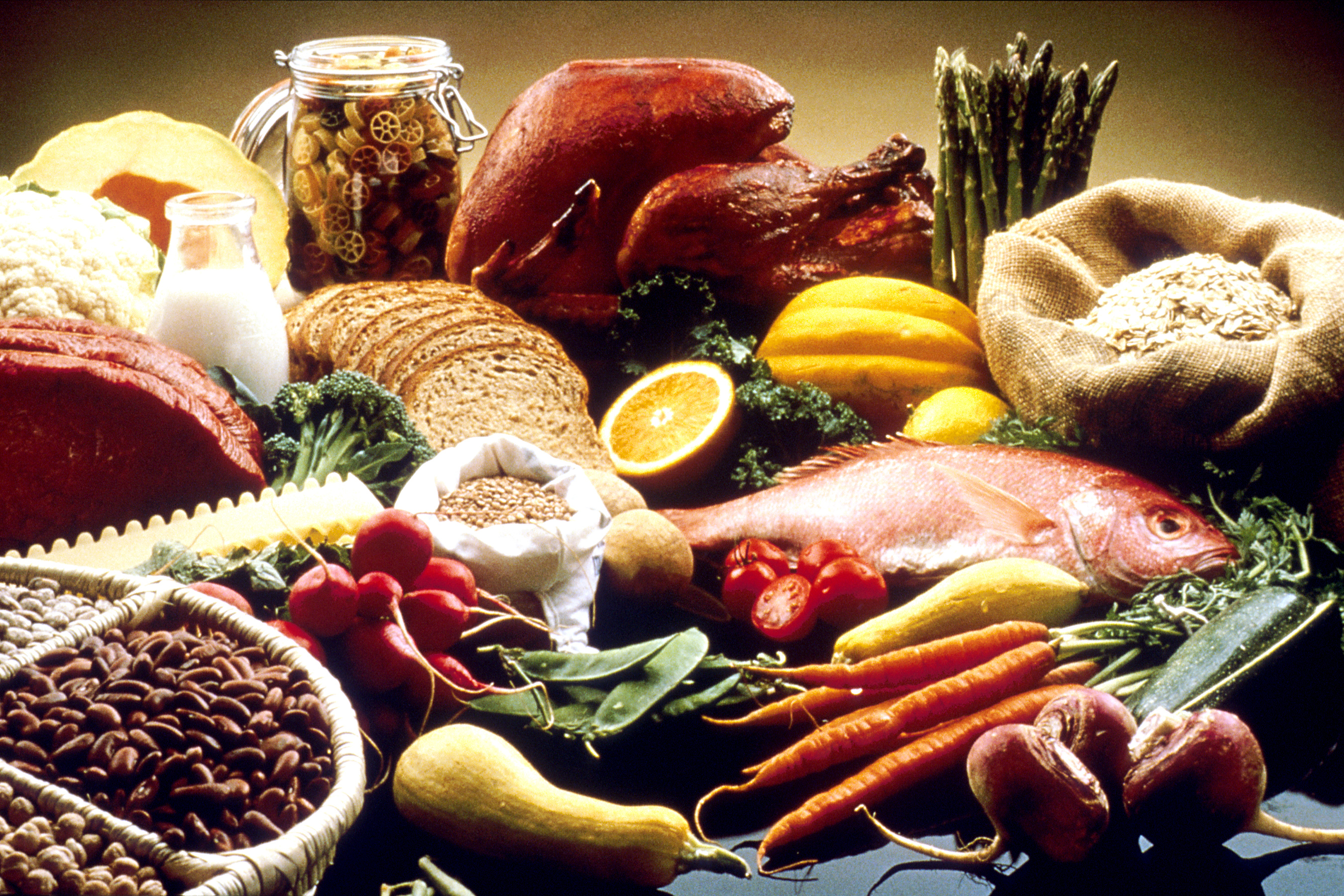
Various foods

Lists of food and beverage topics cover topics related to food and drinks from different points of view. They include lists of foods, beverages, food preparation tools and equipment, food preparation techniques, cuisines and industrial food preparation and distribution operations including breweries.

== Foods ==
- Lists of foods
- Lists of prepared foods
- List of sugars
- Outline of food preparation

== Defining terms in beverages and explaining methods of preparation ==
- Lists of drinks

== Tools and equipment ==
- List of cooking appliances
- List of food preparation utensils
  - List of Japanese cooking utensils
  - List of serving utensils
- List of ovens
- List of stoves

== Techniques ==
- List of cooking techniques
- List of culinary knife cuts

== Cuisines ==
- List of cuisines
- Outline of cuisines

== Industry ==
- List of bean-to-bar chocolate manufacturers
- List of chefs
- List of cideries in the United States
- List of dairy product companies in the United States
- List of food companies
  - List of bakeries
  - List of bakery cafés
  - List of doughnut shops
- List of restaurateurs
- List of supermarket chains in the United States
- Lists of restaurants

=== Breweries ===
- List of breweries in Armenia
- List of breweries in Australia
- List of breweries in Canada
  - List of breweries in British Columbia
  - List of breweries, wineries, and distilleries in Manitoba
  - List of breweries in Quebec
- List of breweries in England
  - List of breweries in Berkshire
  - List of breweries in Birmingham
  - List of breweries in the Black Country
- List of breweries in Ireland
- List of breweries in The Netherlands
- List of breweries in New Zealand
- List of beers and breweries in Nigeria
- List of breweries in Scotland
- List of breweries in the United States
- List of breweries in Alabama
- List of breweries in Alaska
- List of breweries in Arizona
- List of breweries in Arkansas
- List of breweries in California
  - List of breweries in San Diego County, California
- List of breweries in Colorado
- List of breweries in Connecticut
- List of breweries in Delaware
- List of breweries in Florida
- List of breweries in Georgia
- List of breweries in Hawaii
- List of breweries in Idaho
- List of breweries in Illinois
- List of breweries in Indiana
- List of breweries in Iowa
- List of breweries in Kansas
- List of breweries in Kentucky
- List of breweries in Louisiana
- List of breweries in Maine
- List of breweries in Maryland
- List of breweries in Massachusetts
- List of breweries in Michigan
- List of breweries in Minnesota
- List of breweries in Mississippi
- List of breweries in Missouri
- List of breweries in Montana
- List of breweries in Nebraska
- List of breweries in Nevada
- List of breweries in New Hampshire
- List of wineries, breweries, and distilleries in New Jersey
- List of breweries in New Mexico
- List of breweries in New York
- List of breweries in North Carolina
- List of breweries and wineries in North Dakota
- List of breweries in Ohio
- List of breweries in Oklahoma
- List of breweries in Oregon
- List of breweries in Pennsylvania
- List of breweries in Rhode Island
- List of breweries in South Carolina
- List of breweries and wineries in South Dakota
- List of breweries in Tennessee
- List of breweries in Texas
- List of breweries in the United States Virgin Islands
- List of breweries in Virginia
- List of breweries in Washington (state)
- List of breweries in Washington, D.C.
- List of breweries in West Virginia
- List of breweries in Wisconsin
  - List of brewers in Milwaukee County
- List of breweries in Wyoming
- List of Dutch breweries
- List of microbreweries

== Others ==
- Index of organic food articles
- List of brand name food products
- List of cholesterol in foods
- List of countries by milk consumption per capita
- List of countries by tea consumption per capita
- List of dining events
- List of food and beverage museums
- List of food cooperatives
- List of food riots
- List of incidents of cannibalism
- List of websites about food and drink
