= List of breweries in Iowa =

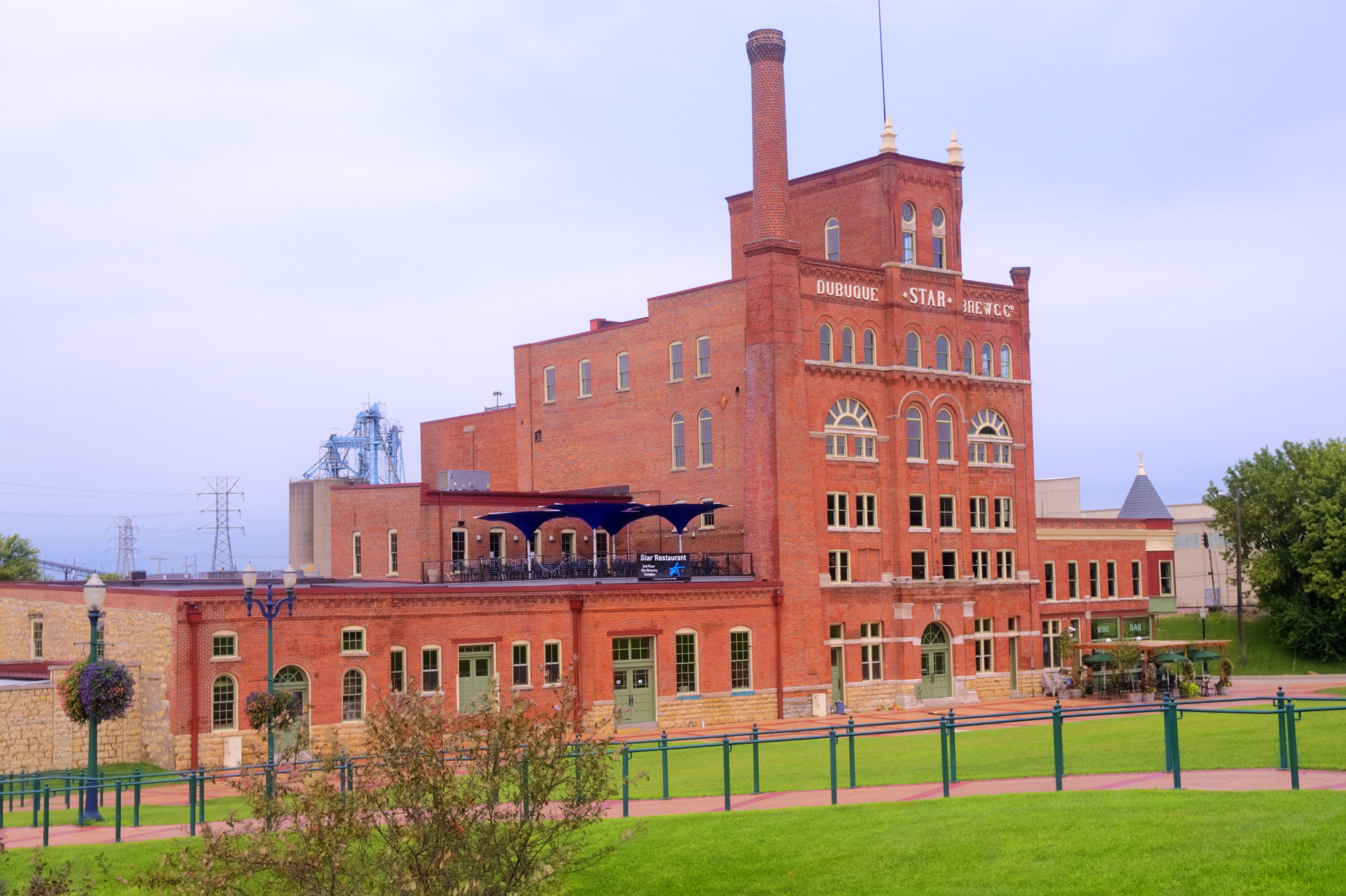
Dubuque Star Brewery

Breweries in Iowa produce a wide range of beers in different styles that are marketed locally and regionally. Brewing companies vary widely in the volume and variety of beer produced, from small nanobreweries to microbreweries to massive multinational conglomerate macrobreweries. Iowa is a state located in the Midwestern United States, an area often referred to as the "American Heartland".

In 2012 Iowa's 38 breweries and brewpubs employed 140 people directly, and more than 12,000 others in related jobs such as wholesaling and retailing. Including people directly employed in brewing, as well as those who supply Iowa's breweries with everything from ingredients to machinery, the total business and personal tax revenue generated by Iowa's breweries and related industries was more than $230 million. Consumer purchases of Iowa's brewery products generated more than $100 million additional tax revenue. In 2012, according to the Brewers Association, Iowa ranked 15th in the number of craft breweries per capita with 33.

For context, at the end of 2013 there were 2,822 breweries in the United States, including 2,768 craft breweries subdivided into 1,237 brewpubs, 1,412 microbreweries and 119 regional craft breweries. In that same year, according to the Beer Institute, the brewing industry employed around 43,000 Americans in brewing and distribution and had a combined economic impact of more than $246 billion.

== Breweries in Iowa ==
- 1st Down Brewing Co. – Winterset
- 5 Alarm Brewing Company – Lake Mills
- 515 Brewing Company – Clive
- 5ive Cities Brewing – Bettendorf
- 7 Hills Brewing Company – Dubuque, Dyersville
- Adam McHenry (future) – Windsor
- Adventurous Brewing Company – Bettendorf
- Allerton Brewing Company – Independence
- Alluvial Brewing Company – Ames
- Backcountry Winery & Brewery – Stratford
- Backpocket Brewing – Coralville, Dubuque, Johnston
- BackRoad Brewery – Carlisle
- Barn Town Brewing – West Des Moines
- Beer in the Barn Brewery – St. Donatus
- Benton County Brewing Company – Belle Plaine
- Big's BBQ Brew Pub – Mt. Vernon
- Big Grove Brewery – Des Moines, Iowa City, Solon, Cedar Rapids
- Big Rack Brew Haus – Winterset
- BIT Brewery – Central City
- Blind Butcher Brewing Company – Inwood
- Boone Valley Brewing Co. – Boone
- Bremer Brewing Company – Waverly
- Breü Haus Coffee + Brewery – Sheldon
- Brew-lik Brewing Company – Olin
- Brightside Aleworks – Altoona
- Brioux City Brewery – Sioux City
- Carroll Brewing Co – Carroll
- Catfish Creek Brew Pub – Dubuque
- Clock House Brewing – Cedar Rapids
- Confluence Brewing Company – Des Moines
- Contrary Brewing Company – Muscatine
- Court Avenue Brewing Company – Des Moines
- Crawford Brew Works – Bettendorf
- Deb's Brewtopia – Elkader
- Depot Restaurant & Lounge – Shenandoah
- Dimensional Brewing Company – Dubuque, Peosta
- Drink Me Brewing Company – Sibley
- E18 Brewing Company – Boone
- Exile Brewing Company – Des Moines
- Farmhand Brewing Company – Earling
- Fat Hill Brewing – Mason City
- Fenceline Beer Lab – Huxley
- Fenders Brewing – Polk City
- Field Day Brewing Co. – North Liberty
- Firetrucker Brewery – Ankeny
- Five Cities Brewing – Bettendorf
- Flix Brewhouse – Des Moines
- Franklin Street Brewing Company – Manchester
- Front Street Brewery – Davenport
- Full Fledged Brewing Company – Council Bluffs
- Gamble Block Brewery – Perry
- Gezellig Brewing Co – Newton
- Granite City Food & Brewery – Cedar Rapids, Davenport
- Green Tree Brewery – Le Claire
- Guttenberg Brewing Company – Guttenberg
- Hot Air Brewing – Creston
- House Divided Brewery – Ely
- Into Brewing Company – Indianola
- Iowa Brewing Company – Cedar Rapids
- Jackson Street Brewing – Sioux City
- Jubeck New World Brewing – Dubuque
- Kalona Brewing Company – Kalona
- Keg Creek Brewing Company – Glenwood
- Kinship Brewing Company – Waukee
- Lake Time Brewery – Clear Lake
- Late Harvest Brewery – Sioux Center
- Limestone Brewers – Osage
- Lion Bridge Brewing Company – Cedar Rapids
- Lost Duck Brewing Company – Fort Madison
- Lua Brewing – Des Moines
- Maquoketa Brewing – Maquoketa
- Marto Brewing Co. – Sioux City
- Mason City Brewing Company – Mason City
- Millstream Brewing Company – Amana
- Nerdspeak Brewery – Bettendorf
- NoCoast Beer Co. – Oskaloosa
- Okoboji Brewing Company – Spirit Lake
- Parkside Brewing Company – Burlington
- Peace Tree Brewing Company – Knoxville, Des Moines (closed June 2024)
- PIVO Brewery – Calmar
- Pulpit Rock Brewing – Decorah
- Reclaimed Rails Brewing Company – Bondurant
- ReUnion Brewery – Coralville, Iowa City
- River Hops Brewing – Fort Dodge
- River Ridge Brewing – Bellevue
- Rock River Brewing Company – Rock Rapids
- Rustic Brew – Hampton
- Second State Brewing Co. – Cedar Falls
- ShinyTop Brewing – Fort Dodge
- SingleSpeed Brewing Company – Cedar Falls, Waterloo
- Stompbox Brewing – Davenport
- Tellurian Brewing – Charles City
- Textile Brewing – Atkins, Cascade, Dyersville
- The Busted Cup Brewhouse – Burlington
- The Granary – Eldridge
- The Grange Public House and Brewery – Mount Pleasant
- The Iowa Project Brewing Company – Spencer
- The Old Man River Restaurant & Brewery – McGregor
- The Press Room Brewery – Belmond
- The Quarter Barrel Arcade and Brewery – Cedar Rapids
- Third Base Brewery – Cedar Rapids
- Timbukbrü – Iowa Falls
- Titonka Brewing Company – Titonka
- TLC Brew Works – Holy Cross
- Top Dog Brewing – Algona
- Toppling Goliath Brewery – Decorah
- Torrent Brewing Company – Ames
- Tractor Lift Brewing – Humboldt
- Twin Span Brewing – Bettendorf
- Twisted Vine Brewery – West Des Moines
- West Hill Brewing Company - Indianola
- West O Beer Company – West Okoboji
- Wise I Brewing Company – Le Mars
- Worth Brewing Company – Northwood

== See also ==
- Beer in the United States
- List of breweries in the United States
- List of microbreweries
