= List of breweries in Mississippi =

Breweries in Mississippi produce a wide range of beers in different styles that are marketed locally, regionally, and nationally. Brewing companies vary widely in the volume and variety of beer produced, from small nanobreweries and microbreweries to massive multinational conglomerate macrobreweries.

In 2012 Mississippi's three brewing establishments (including breweries, brewpubs, importers, and company-owned packagers and wholesalers) employed 30 people directly, and more than 6,800 others in related jobs such as wholesaling and retailing. Altogether, three people in Mississippi had active brewer permits in 2012.

Including people directly employed in brewing, as well as those who supply Mississippi's breweries with everything from ingredients to machinery, the total business and personal tax revenue generated by Mississippi's breweries and related industries was more than $128 million. Consumer purchases of Mississippi's brewery products generated more than $101 million extra in tax revenue. In 2012, according to the Brewers Association, Mississippi ranked 51st (including the District of Columbia) in the number of craft breweries per capita, with three .

For context, at the end of 2013 there were 2,822 breweries in the United States, including 2,768 craft breweries subdivided into 1,237 brewpubs, 1,412 microbreweries and 119 regional craft breweries. In that same year, according to the Beer Institute, the brewing industry employed around 43,000 Americans in brewing and distribution and had a combined economic impact of more than $246 billion.

== Breweries ==
- 1817 Brewery - Okolona
- Biloxi Brewing Company - Biloxi [Closed in 2019]
- Chandeleur Island Brewing Company - Gulfport
- Circle and Square Brewing Company Oxford
- Colludium Brewing Company - Hattiesburg [Closed in 2023]
- Craft Advisory Brewing - Ocean Springs
- Crooked Letter Brewery - Ocean Springs [Closed in 2019]
- Fly Llama Brewing - Biloxi
- Fort Bayou Brewing at Cypress Taproom - Ocean Springs
- Key City Brewing Company / Cottonwood Public House - Vicksburg
- Lazy Magnolia Brewing Company – Kiln
- Lost Spring Brewing - Ocean Springs
- Lucky Town Brewing Company – Jackson [Closed as of 3/9/2019]
- Mayhew Junction Brewing Company - Starkville [Closed in 2021]
- Mississippi Brewing Company - Gulfport [Closed]
- Natchez Brewing Company - Natchez
- Slowboat Brewing Company - Laurel [Closed in 2019]
- Southern Prohibition Brewing Company – Hattiesburg
- Threefoot Brewing Company - Meridian
- Yalobusha Brewing Company – Water Valley[Closed]
- Gordon Creek Brewery – Hattiesburg [Closed]
- Oxford Brewing Company – Oxford [Closed]
- SweetGum Brewing Company – Starkville [Closed]

== See also ==
- Beer in the United States
- List of breweries in the United States
- List of microbreweries
