= List of breweries in Missouri =

Breweries in Missouri produce a wide range of beers in different styles that are marketed locally, regionally, nationally, and internationally. The greatest concentration of breweries is in the Greater St. Louis area, which is home to at least 65 different breweries, including a number of brewpubs and microbreweries. St. Louis is also the North American headquarters of Anheuser-Busch InBev, one of the world's largest brewers. Brewing companies vary widely in the volume and variety of beer produced, from small nanobreweries and microbreweries to massive multinational conglomerate macrobreweries.

In 2012 Missouri's 58 brewing establishments (including breweries, brewpubs, importers, and company-owned packagers and wholesalers) employed 3,890 people directly, and more than 21,000 others in related jobs such as wholesaling and retailing. Altogether 51 people in Missouri had active brewer permits in 2012.

Including people directly employed in brewing, as well as those who supply Missouri's breweries with everything from ingredients to machinery, the total business and personal tax revenue generated by Missouri's breweries and related industries was more than $2.5 billion. Consumer purchases of Missouri's brewery products generated more than $142 million extra in tax revenue. In 2012, according to the Brewers Association, Missouri ranked 23rd in the number of craft breweries per capita with 47.

For context, at the end of 2013 there were 2,822 breweries in the United States, including 2,768 craft breweries subdivided into 1,237 brewpubs, 1,412 microbreweries and 119 regional craft breweries. In that same year, according to the Beer Institute, the brewing industry employed around 43,000 Americans in brewing and distribution and had a combined economic impact of more than $246 billion.

== Breweries ==
Brewery	Type	City	Metropolitan area	Date Opened
2nd Shift Brewing	Microbrewery	St. Louis	St. Louis	2009
4 by 4 Brewing Company (Galloway)	Microbrewery	Springfield	Springfield	2017
4 by 4 Brewing Company (Fremont Hills)	Microbrewery	Springfield	Springfield	2023
4 Hands Brewing Company	Microbrewery	St. Louis	St. Louis	2011
Alpha Brewing Company	Microbrewery	St. Louis	St. Louis	2013
Anheuser-Busch	International	St. Louis	St. Louis	
Banter Brewing Co.	Microbrewery	Springfield	Springfield	2021
Beard Engine Brewing Co.	Microbrewery	Alba	Joplin	2020
Before and After Brewing	Microbrewery	Springfield	Springfield	2023
Bluewood Brewing	Microbrewery	St. Louis	St. Louis	
Border Brewing Co.	Microbrewery	Kansas City	Kansas City	
Boulevard Brewing Company	Regional	Kansas City	Kansas City	1989
Broadway Brewery	Brewpub	Columbia	Columbia	
Bur Oak Brewing Company	Microbrewery	Columbia	Columbia	
Center Ice Brewing Company	Microbrewery	St. Louis	St. Louis	2017
Calibration Brewery	Microbrwery	North Kansas City	Kansas City	
Cinder Block Brewery	Microbrewery	Kansas City	Kansas City	
Civil Life Brewing Co.	Microbrewery	St. Louis	St. Louis	2011
Crane Brewing	Microbrewery	Raytown	Kansas City	
Double Shift Brewing Co.	Microbrewery	Kansas City	Kansas City	
Earthbound Beer	Microbrewery	St. Louis	St. Louis	2014
Flat Branch Pub & Brewing	Brewpub	Columbia	Columbia	
Friendship Brewing Company	Microbrewery	Wentzville	St Louis	2016
Gordon Biersch Brewery Restaurant	Brewpub	Kansas City	Kansas City	
Great Escape Beer Works	Microbrewery	Springfield	Springfield	2018
Griesedieck Brothers beer	Contract	St. Louis	St. Louis	
Heavy Riff Brewing	Microbrewery	St. Louis	St. Louis	2013
Hold Fast Brewing	Microbrewery	Springfield	Springfield	2019
Kansas City Bier Company	Microbrewery	Kansas City	Kansas City	
Levi Garrison & Sons Brewing Company	Microbrewery	Hamilton	Kansas City	
Logboat Brewing Company	Microbrewery	Columbia	Columbia	
Martin City Brewing Company	Microbrewery	Kansas City	Kansas City	2013
Modern Brewing Company	Microbrewery	St. Louis	St. Louis	
Mother's Brewing Company	Microbrewery	Springfield	Springfield	2011
Narrow Gauge Brewing Company	Microbrewery	Florissant	St. Louis	
O'Fallon Brewery	Microbrewery	Maryland Heights	St. Louis	
Perennial Artisan Ales	Microbrewery	St. Louis	St. Louis	
Point Labaddie Brewery	Microbrewery	Labadie	St. Louis	
Rock Bridge Brewing Company	Microbrewery	Columbia	Columbia	
Rockwell Beer Co	Microbrewery	St. Louis	St. Louis	
Saint Louis Brewery (Schlafly)	Regional	St. Louis	St. Louis	
Show-Me Brewing	Microbrewery	Springfield	Springfield	2016
Side Project Brewing	Microbrewery	Maplewood	St. Louis	
Six Mile Bridge	Microbrewery	Maryland Heights	St. Louis	
Shortleaf Brewing	Microbrewery	O'Fallon	St. Louis	2019
Shortleaf Brewing	Microbrewery	Camdenton	Camdenton	2022
Springfield Brewing Company	Microbrewery	Springfield	Springfield	1997
Steampunk Brew Works	Microbrewery	Town and Country	St. Louis	2016
Third Wheel Brewing	Microbrewery	St. Peters	St. Louis	2017
Tie & Timber Beer Co.	Microbrewery	Springfield	Springfield	2018
Urban Chestnut Brewing Company	Microbrewery	St. Louis	St. Louis	2011
Wellspent Brewing	Microbrewery	St. Louis	St. Louis	2017
White River Brewing Company	Microbrewery	Springfield	Springfield	2012
Wire Road Brewing Company	Microbrewery	Battlefield	Springfield	2022

=== Former breweries ===
- Falstaff Brewing Corporation - the once large brewery based in St. Louis.
- George Muehlebach Brewing Company - in Kansas City, purchased by Joseph Schlitz Brewing Company in the 1950s, discontinued in 1973.
- Kirkwood Station Brewery - in Kirkwood, MO opened in 2009 and closed on February 28, 2019.
- Lemp Brewery - a former brewery established in 1840 in St. Louis.

== See also ==
- Beer in the United States
- List of breweries in the United States
- List of microbreweries
