= List of breweries in Nebraska =

Breweries in Nebraska produce a wide range of beers in different styles that are marketed locally and regionally. Brewing companies vary widely in the volume and variety of beer produced, from small nanobreweries and microbreweries to massive multinational conglomerate macrobreweries.

In 2012 Nebraska's 38 brewing establishments (including breweries, brewpubs, importers, and company-owned packagers and wholesalers) employed 100 people directly, and more than 6,700 others in related jobs such as wholesaling and retailing. Altogether 19 people in Nebraska had active brewer permits in 2012.

Including people directly employed in brewing, as well as those who supply Nebraska's breweries with everything from ingredients to machinery, the total business and personal tax revenue generated by Nebraska's breweries and related industries was more than $132 million. Consumer purchases of Nebraska's brewery products generated more than $70 million extra in tax revenue. In 2012, according to the Brewers Association, Nebraska ranked 16th in the number of craft breweries per capita with 19.

For context, at the end of 2013 there were 2,822 breweries in the United States, including 2,768 craft breweries subdivided into 1,237 brewpubs, 1,412 microbreweries and 119 regional craft breweries. In that same year, according to the Beer Institute, the brewing industry employed around 43,000 Americans in brewing and distribution and had a combined economic impact of more than $246 billion.

== Breweries ==
The following is a list of Nebraska-based breweries, meaderies and cideries.

| Brewery | Location | Year Established | Notes |
|---|---|---|---|
| Backswing Brewing Company | Lincoln | 2016 | Taproom in Omaha opened in 2021 |
| Benson Brewery | Omaha | 2013 | |
| Big Hair Brewhaus | Hartington | 2021 | |
| Boiler Brewing Company | Lincoln | 2016 | Second Taproom in Lincoln opened in 2019 |
| Bolo Beer Co. | Valentine | 2016 | |
| Bottle Rocket Brewing | Seward | 2015 | |
| Brewery 719 | Alliance | 2019 | |
| Brickway Brewery & Distillery | Omaha | 2013 | |
| Catalyst Brewing Company | Lincoln | 2015 | Originally named 5168 Brewing; Renamed in 2020 |
| Canyon Lakes Brewing Company | Johnson Lake | 2019 | |
| Code Beer Co. | Lincoln | 2017 | |
| Corn Coast Brewing Company | Lincoln | 2021 | |
| Divots | Norfolk | 2016 | |
| Empyrean Brewing Company | Lincoln | 1990 | Empyrean Brewing Co. becomes a separate financial entity from Lazlo's Brewery & Grill in 1997 |
| Fairfield Opera House Brewery & Grill | Fairfield | 2016 | |
| First Street Brewing Co. | Hastings | 2016 | |
| Five-O-Five Brewing Company | Fremont | 2022 | |
| Flyover Brewing Company | Scottsbluff | 2018 | |
| The Frontier Frau | Cozad | 2024 | German Style Beer and Food |
| Gottberg Brewery | Columbus | 2003 | |
| Heavy Brewing | Gretna | 2022 | |
| HWY 14 Brewing Co. | Albion | 2019 | |
| Infusion Brewing Company | Omaha | 2013 | |
| Jaipur Restaurant and Brew House | Omaha | 2003 | |
| Johnnie Byrd Brewing Co. | Wayne | 2017 | |
| Jukes Ale Works | Elkhorn | 2019 | |
| Kinkaider Brewing Company | Broken Bow | 2014 | |
| Kros Strain Brewing Company | La Vista | 2017 | |
| Loop Brewing Company | McCook | 2011 | |
| Lost Way Brewery | Holdrege | 2017 | |
| Lucky Bucket Brewing Company | La Vista | 2009 | |
| Lumen Beer Co. | Omaha | 2022 | |
| Monolithic Brewing Company | Omaha | 2021 | |
| Pals Brewing Company | North Platte | 2017 | |
| Peg Leg Brewing Company | North Platte | 2020 | |
| Pint Nine Brewing Company | La Vista | 2017 | |
| Platte Valley Brewery | Kearney | 2000 | |
| Roc Hopper Brewing Co. | Syracuse | 2019 | No Brick-and-Mortar Taphouse |
| Salt Mine City Brewing Co. | David City | 2022 | Associated with Ropers Bar & Grill |
| SchillingBridge Winery & Microbrewery | Pawnee City | 2005 | |
| Scratchtown Brewing Company | Ord | 2013 | |
| Scriptown Brewing Company | Omaha | 2015 | |
| Scott Free Brewing Co. | Gering | 2024 | |
| Site-1 Brewing | Omaha | 2020 | |
| Steeple Brewing Co. | Hastings | 2017 | |
| Stone Hollow Brewing Co. | Beatrice | 2019 | |
| Thunderhead Brewery | Kearney | 1999 | |
| Upstream Brewing Company | Omaha | 1996 | |
| Vis Major Brewing | Omaha | 2017 | |
| White Elm Brewing Company | Lincoln | 2016 | Second Taproom in Lincoln opened in 2019 |

== Closed Breweries ==
| Brewery | Location | Year Established | Year Closed | Notes |
|---|---|---|---|---|
| Blue Blood Brewing Co. | Lincoln | 2011 | 2019 | Moved to Robbers Cave location in 2016 |
| Brush Creek Brewing Company | Atkinson | 2017 | 2023 | |
| Cosmic Eye Brewing | Lincoln | 2018 | 2024 | |
| Farnam House Brewing | Omaha | 2014 | 2022 | Formerly Goldenrod Brewing |
| Green Flash Brewing Co. | Lincoln | 2017 | 2020 | Opened as third Brew location of San Diego–based Brewery |
| Modern Monks Brewery | Lincoln | 1992 | 2018 | Associated with Misty's Steakhouse. Inherited the beer operation from Crane River in 2003. Crane River opened as the city's second brew pub in 1992. |
| Moonstruck Meadery | Bellevue | 2011 | 2017 | The first meadery to open in the state of Nebraska |
| Nebraska Brewing Company | Papillion | 2007 | 2025 | |
| Ploughshare Brewing Co. | Lincoln | 2014 | 2017 | |
| Prairie Pride Brewing Co. | Grand Island | 2016 | 2025 | |
| Spilker Ales | Cortland | 1996 | 2017 | Sold signature beer brand, Hopaluia, to Thunderhead Brewing |
| Storz Brewing Company | Omaha | 1854 | 1977 | Formerly Saratoga Brewery, Columbia Brewery |
| Zipline Brewing Company | Lincoln | 2012 | 2026 | |

== See also ==
- List of breweries in the United States
- List of microbreweries
