= List of breweries in Arkansas =

Breweries in Arkansas produce a wide range of beers in different styles that are marketed locally, regionally, and nationally. In 2012 Arkansas' 14 breweries, importers, brewpubs, and company-owned packagers and wholesalers employed 100 people directly, and another 6,000 in related jobs such as wholesaling and retailing. Including people directly employed in brewing, as well as those who supply Arkansas' breweries with everything from ingredients to machinery, the total business and personal tax revenue generated by Arkansas' breweries and related industries was more than $129 million. Consumer purchases of Arkansas' brewery products generated another $68 million in tax revenue. In 2012, according to the Brewers Association, Arkansas ranked 41st in per capita craft breweries with 10.

For context, at the end of 2013 there were 2,822 breweries in the United States, including 2,768 craft breweries subdivided into 1,237 brewpubs, 1,412 microbreweries and 119 regional craft breweries. In that same year, according to the Beer Institute, the brewing industry employed around 43,000 Americans in brewing and distribution and had a combined economic impact of more than $246 billion.

== Breweries ==
=== Amity ===
- Slate Rock Brewing

=== Bentonville ===
- Bentonville Brewing Company
- Bike Rack Brewing Company

=== Big Flat ===
- Gravity Brewworks

=== Camden ===
- Native Dog Brewing Company

=== Eureka Springs ===
- Eureka Springs Brewery
- Gotahold

=== Fayetteville ===
- Apple Blossom Brewing Company
- Boston Mountain Brewing
- Columbus House Brewery
- Crisis Brewing
- Fossil Cove Brewing Company
- West Mountain Brewing Company

=== Fort Smith ===
- Fort Smith Brewing Company

=== Harrison ===
- Brick & Forge Brew Works

=== Hot Springs ===
- SQZBX Brewery & Pizza Joint
- Superior Bathhouse Brewery

=== Jacksonville ===
- Blade and Barrel Brewing Company

=== Jonesboro ===
- Native Brew Works

=== Little Rock & North Little Rock ===
- Diamond Bear Brewing Company
- Flyway Brewing Co
- Lost 40 Brewing
- Stone's Throw Brewing
- Vino's Brewpub
- Southern Tail Brewing
- Moody Brews Brewing

=== Norfork ===
- Norfork Brewing Co.

=== Paris ===
- Prestonrose Farm and Brewing Co.

=== Rogers ===
- Ozark Beer Company
- New Province Brewing Company

=== Scranton ===
- Pridgin Family Brewing

=== Siloam Springs ===
- Ivory Bill Brewing Co.

=== Springdale ===
- Core Brewing and Distilling Company
- Hawk Moth Brewery & Beer Parlor
- Saddlebock Brewery

=== Subiaco ===
- Country Monks Brewing

=== Former Breweries ===
- Blue Canoe Brewing Co.
- Buffalo Brewing Company
- Damgoode Pies Brewpub
- East Sixth Brewing Co.
- Rebel Kettle Brewing Co
- Refined Ale Brewery
- Three Birds Brewing Company

== See also ==
- Beer in the United States
- List of breweries in the United States
- List of microbreweries
