= List of breweries in Maryland =

Breweries in Maryland produce a wide range of beers in different styles that are marketed locally, regionally, and nationally. In 2012 Maryland's 34 brewing establishments (including breweries, brewpubs, importers, and company-owned packagers and wholesalers) employed 320 people directly, and more than 20,000 others in related jobs such as wholesaling and retailing. Altogether, 35 people in Maryland had active brewer permits in 2012.

Including people directly employed in brewing, as well as those who supply Maryland's breweries with everything from ingredients to machinery, the total business and personal tax revenue generated by Maryland's breweries and related industries was more than $571 million. Consumer purchases of Maryland's brewery products generated more than $210 million extra in tax revenue. In 2012, according to the Brewers Association, Maryland ranked 37th in the number of craft breweries per capita with 30. As of April, 2019, 79 breweries are members of the Brewers Association of Maryland. In 2018, the Brewers Association ranked Maryland 23rd in the number of craft breweries with a total of 94; Maryland also ranked 22nd in total number of barrels produced at 294,000.

Brewing companies vary widely in the volume and variety of beer produced, from small nanobreweries and microbreweries to massive multinational conglomerate macrobreweries. For context, at the end of 2013 there were 2,822 breweries in the United States, including 2,768 craft breweries subdivided into 1,237 brewpubs, 1,412 microbreweries and 119 regional craft breweries. In that same year, according to the Beer Institute, the brewing industry employed around 43,000 Americans in brewing and distribution and had a combined economic impact of more than $246 billion. In 2017, the economic impact in Maryland from the craft beer industry was over $900 million. In the same year, Maryland breweries also employed over 5,500 full time employees with a labor net income totaling over $300 million. Flying Dog Brewery, located in Frederick, ranked 28th in sales by volume on the 2017 Top 50 list compiled by the Brewers Association.

== Breweries ==
The following is an incomplete list of Maryland breweries, brewpubs, and nanobreweries.

- The Brewer's Art - Baltimore
- Flying Dog Brewery - Frederick
- Clipper City Brewing Company (Heavy Seas Beer) - Baltimore
- Peabody Heights Brewery - Baltimore
- White Marsh Brewing Company - White Marsh

== See also ==
- Beer in the United States
- List of breweries in the United States
- List of microbreweries
