= Brewing in New Hampshire =

New Hampshire ranks 10th nationally in craft breweries per capita, after only Maine and Vermont among East Coast states.

Breweries in New Hampshire produce a wide range of beers in different styles that are marketed locally, regionally, and nationally. Brewing companies vary widely in the volume and variety of beer produced, from small nanobreweries and microbreweries to massive multinational conglomerate macrobreweries.

In 2012 New Hampshire's 21 brewing establishments (including breweries, brewpubs, importers, and company-owned packagers and wholesalers) employed 490 people directly, and more than 5,000 others in related jobs such as wholesaling and retailing. Altogether 21 people in New Hampshire had active brewer permits in 2012.

Including people directly employed in brewing, as well as those who supply New Hampshire's breweries with everything from ingredients to machinery, the total business and personal tax revenue generated by New Hampshire's breweries and related industries was more than $264 million. Consumer purchases of New Hampshire's brewery products generated more than $37 million extra in tax revenue. In 2012, according to the Brewers Association, New Hampshire ranked 10th in the number of craft breweries per capita with 21.

For context, at the end of 2013 there were 2,822 breweries in the United States, including 2,768 craft breweries subdivided into 1,237 brewpubs, 1,412 microbreweries and 119 regional craft breweries. In that same year, according to the Beer Institute, the brewing industry employed around 43,000 Americans in brewing and distribution and had a combined economic impact of more than $246 billion.

== History ==
New Hampshire has a long history of brewing, though the recent microbrewing movement has been somewhat slower to catch on here than in neighboring states. There is evidence of brewing at Strawbery Banke, now Portsmouth, as early as 1635, with most beer being brewed at taverns for the next two centuries. Despite Portsmouth's waning overall importance in the state, the Frank Jones Brewery was the dominant brewery from its inception in 1859 until New Hampshire began Prohibition in 1917. Many breweries were consolidated in the years following the repeal of Prohibition, and the state went without a brewery from 1950 until the opening of the Anheuser-Busch regional brewery in 1970. Portsmouth, however, has been restored as the brewing capital of New Hampshire with the state's second and third largest breweries, Seattle-based Redhook, and Smuttynose Brewing Company, the largest and oldest New Hampshire-based brewery still in operation. Despite lagging behind its neighbors, a nascent craft beer culture is emerging in New Hampshire, and the state recently released an official brewery map to promote local beer.

== Beers ==
=== Popular ===
The Portsmouth Brewery was the first brewpub in New Hampshire, and is known nationally for its Russian imperial stout "Kate the Great", which has been called both the best beer in America and the most sought-after beer in America.

=== Industry medals ===
New Hampshire beers from seven different breweries have won nineteen medals in the annual Great American Beer Festival competition since 1994. These include three gold and nine silver medals across various categories.

== Breweries ==
All breweries listed are licensed by the New Hampshire State Liquor Commission. As of February 2018, there are 86 breweries in New Hampshire.

=== National breweries ===
New Hampshire is home to two regional locations of national breweries:

- Anheuser-Busch - the Merrimack facility has been the largest brewery in New England since 1970. The Merrimack campus is home to one group of the famous Budweiser Clydesdales, and the stalls are open to the public seasonally.
- Redhook Ale Brewery - the East Coast brewery of the Seattle-based company, and the second-largest brewery in the state, has been located in Portsmouth since 1996. The facility also brews Widmer Brothers and Kona Brewing Company beers for East Coast distribution.

=== Regional breweries ===
New Hampshire has one regional brewery, based on the criteria production over 15,000 bbl per year.

- Smuttynose Brewing Company - Portsmouth-based brewery founded in Portsmouth in 1994; relocated to a new facility in Hampton in late 2013

=== Microbreweries ===
As of February 2019, there were 23 breweries operating in New Hampshire that could be described as microbreweries, with annual production under 15,000 bbls per year.

- Tuckerman Brewing Company - Conway-based brewery widely known statewide for its pale ale, founded in 1998

=== Nanobreweries ===
New Hampshire has a nanobrewery license that allows a brewery to produce up to 2,000 bbl (34,000 L) a year at a reduced annual license fee, and to sell limited amounts of beer on premises, as opposed to the free samples allowed at breweries holding a beverage manufacturer's license. Many nanobreweries have opened since these laws were changed. The recent emergence of many nanobreweries will allow future exploration of these and other styles in small batches.

As of February 2019, there were 38 nanobreweries licensed in New Hampshire.

== Brewers guilds ==
- The Granite State Brewers Association is located in Hooksett.
- The New Hampshire Brewers Guild

== See also ==
- Beer in the United States
- List of breweries in the United States
- List of microbreweries
