= List of breweries in Delaware =

Breweries in Delaware produce a wide range of beers in different styles that are marketed locally, regionally, nationally, and internationally.

In 2012 Delaware's 10 breweries and brewpubs employed 200 people directly, and 2,600 others in related jobs such as wholesaling and retailing. Including people directly employed in brewing, as well as those who supply Delaware's breweries with everything from ingredients to machinery, the total business and personal tax revenue generated by Delaware's breweries and related industries was more than $66 million. Consumer purchases of Delaware's brewery products generated another $16 million in tax revenue. In 2012, according to the Brewers Association, Delaware ranked 14th in the number of craft breweries per capita, with 10.

As of May 2014, there were eight breweries in the state of Delaware that are members of the Delaware Brewers Guild.

For context, at the end of 2013 there were 2,822 breweries in the United States, including 2,768 craft breweries subdivided into 1,237 brewpubs, 1,412 microbreweries and 119 regional craft breweries. In that same year, according to the Beer Institute, the brewing industry employed around 43,000 Americans in brewing and distribution and had a combined economic impact of more than $246 billion.

== Breweries ==
- Dogfish Head Brewery – Milton/Rehoboth Beach
- Iron Hill Brewery & Restaurant – Newark/Wilmington/Rehoboth Beach
- Fordham & Dominion Brewing Company – Dover
- Twin Lakes Brewing Company – Newport

== See also ==
- Beer in the United States
- List of breweries in the United States
- List of microbreweries
