= List of breweries in Kentucky =

Breweries in Kentucky produce a wide range of beers in different styles that are marketed locally and regionally. Brewing companies vary widely in the volume and variety of beer produced, from small nanobreweries to microbreweries to massive multinational conglomerate macrobreweries.

In 2012 Kentucky's 21 breweries and brewpubs employed 270 people directly, and more than 8,000 others in related jobs such as wholesaling and retailing. Including people directly employed in brewing, as well as those who supply Kentucky's breweries with everything from ingredients to machinery, the total business and personal tax revenue generated by Kentucky's breweries and related industries was more than $167 million. Consumer purchases of Kentucky's brewery products generated more than $160 million in additional tax revenue. In 2012, according to the Brewers Association, Kentucky ranked 43rd in the number of craft breweries per capita with 14.

For context, at the end of 2013 there were 2,822 breweries in the United States, including 2,768 craft breweries subdivided into 1,237 brewpubs, 1,412 microbreweries and 119 regional craft breweries. In that same year, according to the Beer Institute, the brewing industry employed around 43,000 Americans in brewing and distribution and had a combined economic impact of more than $246 billion.

== Breweries ==
=== Active breweries ===
- 3rd Turn Brewing – Jeffersontown/Crestwood
- Abettor Brewing Company – Winchester
- Against the Grain Brewery – Louisville
- Akasha Brewing Company – Louisville
- Alexandria Brewing Company – Alexandria
- Apocalypse Brew Works – Louisville
- Atrium - Louisville
- Awry - Louisville
- Big Rock Bar & Brew - Louisville
- Birds Nest Brewing Company – Danville
- Black Type Brewing - Lexington
- Blue Stallion Brewing – Lexington
- Braxton Brewing Company – Covington/Bellevue/Fort Mitchell
- Burl Brew - Lexington
- Chinkapin Brewing - Georgetown
- Country Boy Brewing – Lexington/Georgetown
- The Dam Brewhaus – Benton
- Darkness Brewing – Bellevue
- Dreaming Creek - Richmond
- Dry Ground Brewing Company – Paducah
- Ethereal Brewing – Lexington
- Fabled Brew Works - Erlanger
- Falls City Brewery – Louisville
- Flywheel Brewing – Elizabeththown
- Gallant Fox - Louisville, Mt Washington
- Gravely - Louisville
- Heroes Brewery - Lancaster
- Hop Atomica- Louisville
- Hop Hound Brew Pub – Murray
- HubHaus – Elizabethtown
- Jarfly Brewing Company – Somerset
- Lexington Brewing and Distilling Company – Lexington
- Mash Cult Brewing – Florence
- Mile Wide Beer Co. – Louisville
- Paducah Beer Werks – Paducah
- Tap on Main Brewing – Somerset
- West Sixth Brewing – Lexington/Frankfort/Louisville
- White Squirrel Brewery– Bowling Green
- Wooden Cask Brewing Company – Newport
- Yancey's Gastropub & Brewery – Glasgow
- Stainless Brewing and Spirits – Frankfort

=== Defunct breweries ===
- Oldenberg Brewery, a defunct brewery and pub in Fort Mitchell, Kentucky (Note: The brewery expanded to locations in Louisville, Kentucky and Oviedo, Florida, shortly before being sold and going out of business. Not to be confused with the Creek Bottom Brew in Oldenburg, Indiana; nor the Oldenburg Brewing Company in Belle Plaine, Minnesota.) – and The American Museum of Brewing Arts part of a Greater Cincinnati tourist expansion.
- Great Flood Brewing Co.
- Bluegrass Brewing Company – Louisville
- Shippingport Brewing – Louisville

== See also ==
- Beer in the United States
- List of breweries in the United States
- List of defunct breweries in the United States
- List of microbreweries
