= List of breweries in the United States =

At the end of 2017, there were total 7,450 breweries in the United States, including 7,346 craft breweries subdivided into 2,594 brewpubs, 4,522 microbreweries, 230 regional craft breweries and 104 large/non-craft breweries. From 2017 data, according to the Beer Institute, the beer industry generated nearly 2.33 million jobs in brewing, distribution and supply, which had a combined economic impact of more than $350 billion. As of 2012, the U.S. state with the highest number of craft breweries per capita was Vermont, with 1 brewery for every 24,067 people. In 2022, Vermont remained first with 15 breweries per 100,000 people.

In 2022, craft brewers had retail sales of $28.4 billion. That accounted for 24.6% of the total US beer market.

== Breweries by state ==
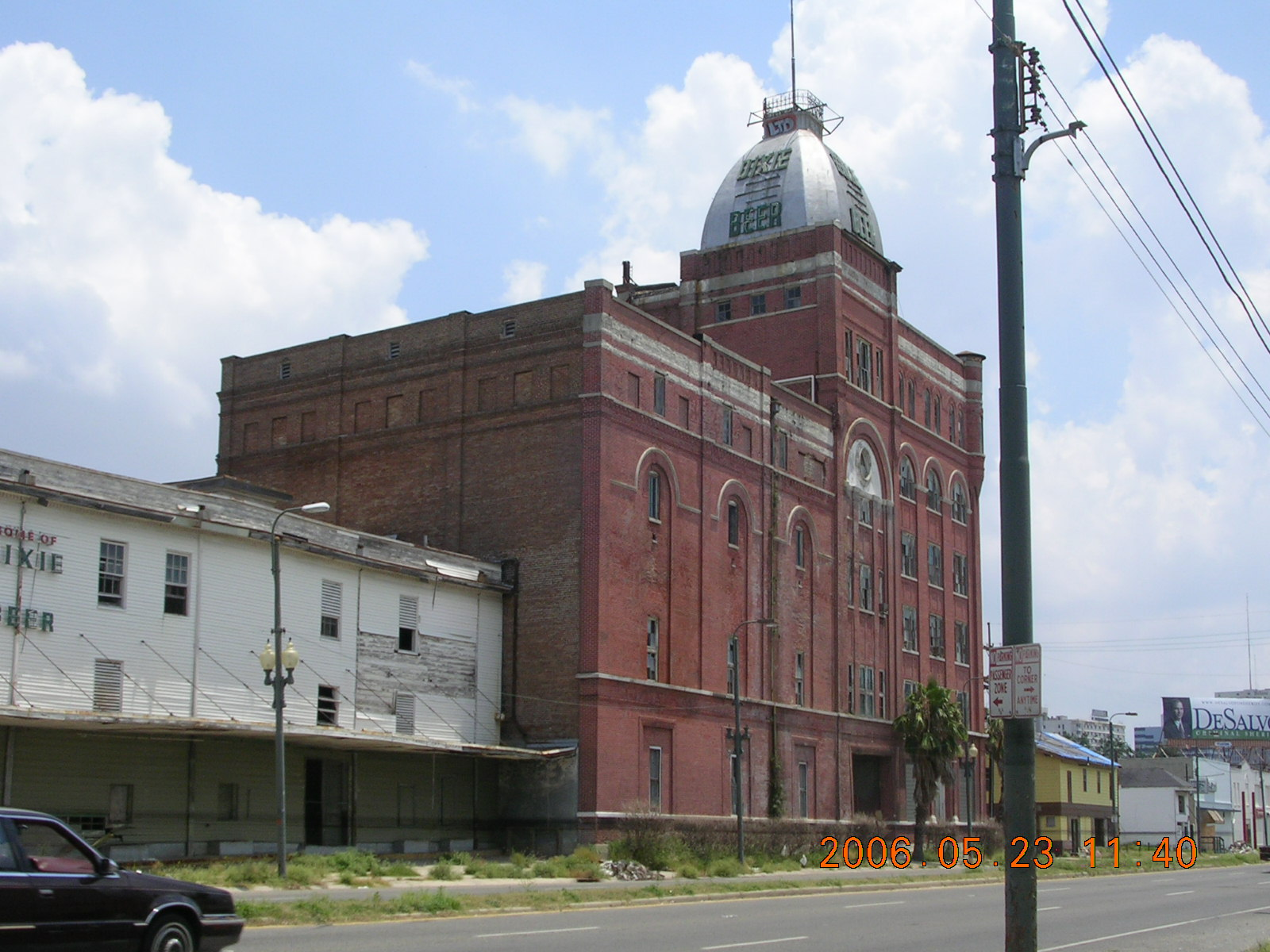
Dixie Brewing Company in New Orleans, Louisiana

New Albanian Brewing Company's public house in New Albany, Indiana

- List of breweries in Alabama
- List of breweries in Alaska
- List of breweries in Arizona
- List of breweries in Arkansas
- List of breweries in California
- List of breweries in Colorado
- List of breweries in Connecticut
- List of breweries in Delaware
- List of breweries in Florida
- List of breweries in Georgia
- List of breweries in Hawaii
- List of breweries in Idaho
- List of breweries in Illinois
- List of breweries in Indiana
- List of breweries in Iowa
- List of breweries in Kansas
- List of breweries in Kentucky
- List of breweries in Louisiana
- List of breweries in Maine
- List of breweries in Maryland
- List of breweries in Massachusetts
- List of breweries in Michigan
- List of breweries in Minnesota
- List of breweries in Mississippi
- List of breweries in Missouri
- List of breweries in Montana
- List of breweries in Nebraska
- List of breweries in Nevada
- List of breweries in New Hampshire
- List of breweries in New Jersey
- List of breweries in New Mexico
- List of breweries in New York
- List of breweries in North Carolina
- List of breweries in North Dakota
- List of breweries in Ohio
- List of breweries in Oklahoma
- List of breweries in Oregon
- List of breweries in Pennsylvania
- List of breweries in Rhode Island
- List of breweries in South Carolina
- List of breweries in South Dakota
- List of breweries in Tennessee
- List of breweries in Texas
- List of breweries in Utah
- List of breweries in Vermont
- List of breweries in Virginia
- List of breweries in Washington
- List of breweries in Washington, D.C.
- List of breweries in West Virginia
- List of breweries in Wisconsin
  - List of brewers in Milwaukee County, Wisconsin
- List of breweries in Wyoming

== See also ==
- Beer and breweries by region
- Beer in the United States
- List of microbreweries
- List of defunct breweries in the United States
