= Oshikundu =

Traditional Namibian drink

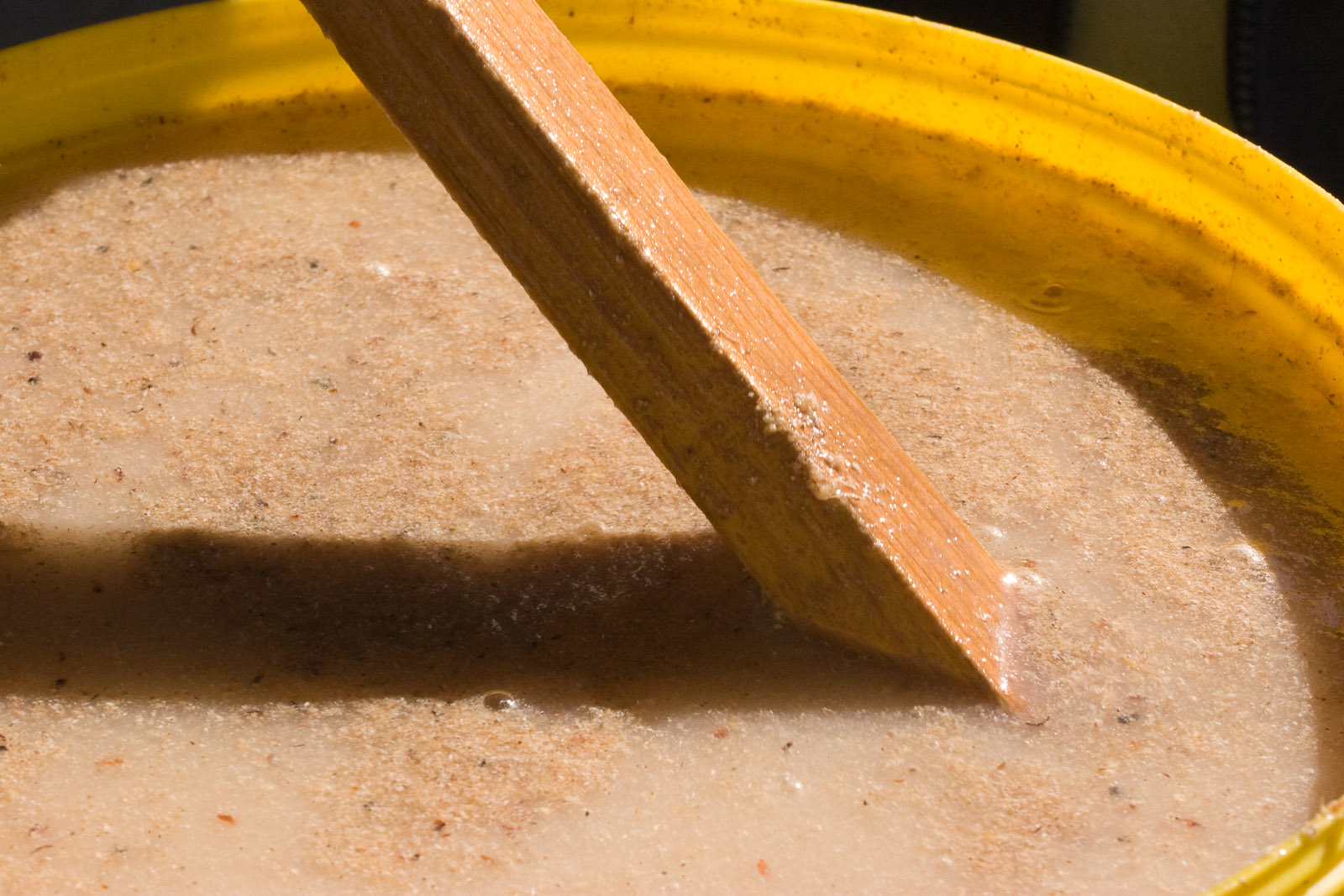
Oshikundu

Oshikundu or ontaku is a traditional Namibian drink made from fermented millet (mahangu) flour, brans and malted sorghum flour mixed with tepid water. It is made from cereal. Ontaku has a short life span and must be consumed within six hours once it is ready. Ontaku is more common among Aawambo people and in some parts of the Kavango Region. The knowledge of creating Ontaku has been verbally passed from one generation to the other, hence existing through generations of Aawambo. It is widely sold in open markets and mostly associated with rural areas and northern Namibia. Oshikundu can be served with porridge to bolster its flavor and nutritional content in the absence of sizeable foods.

The combination is left to ferment for several hours at room temperature. Once Oshikundu is ready to drink, it becomes brown with a thick texture. It is nutritious, but it only lasts for a short time. It is usually a home-brewed drink that is enjoyed daily.

A study conducted in 2001 by the Department of Food Science at the University of Namibia revealed that it was possible to create a dry mix containing malted pearl millet and sorghum, which would be nutritionally enhanced with bambara nut. This mix could then be sold for making oshikundu.

== See also ==
- Beer style
