= Lists of prepared foods =

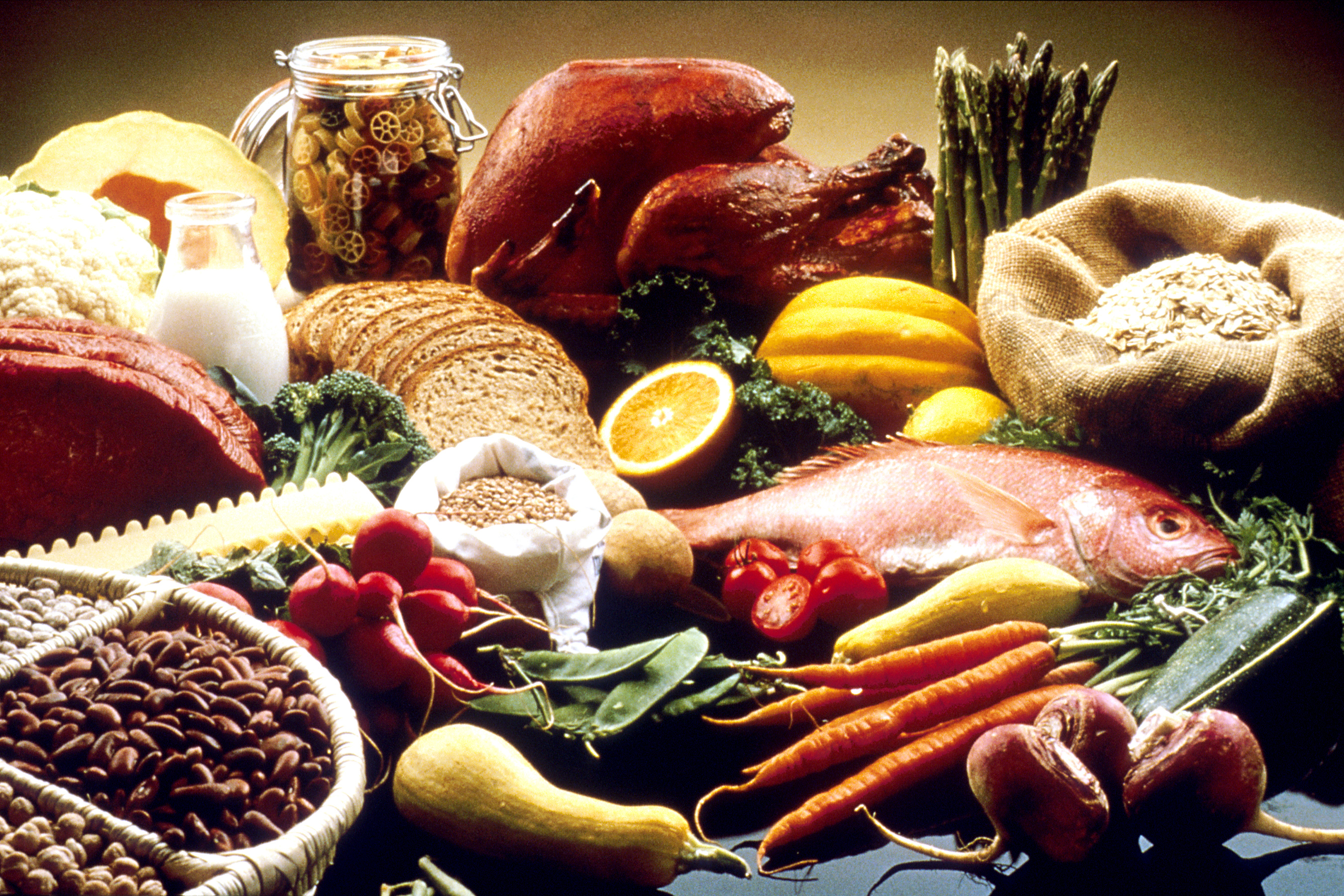
A variety of foods

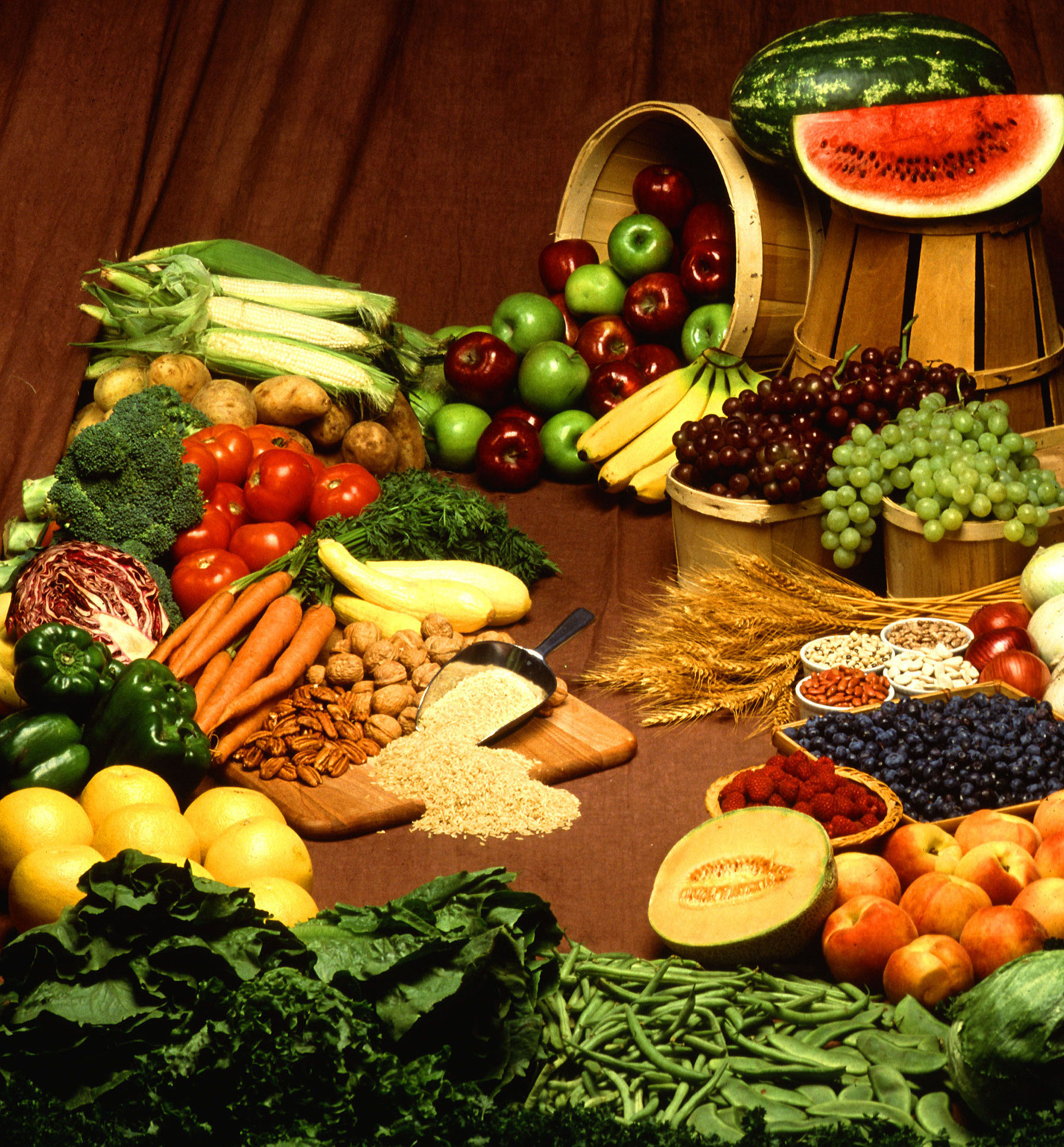
Foods from plant sources

This is a list of prepared-foods list articles on Wikipedia.

== Lists of prepared foods ==
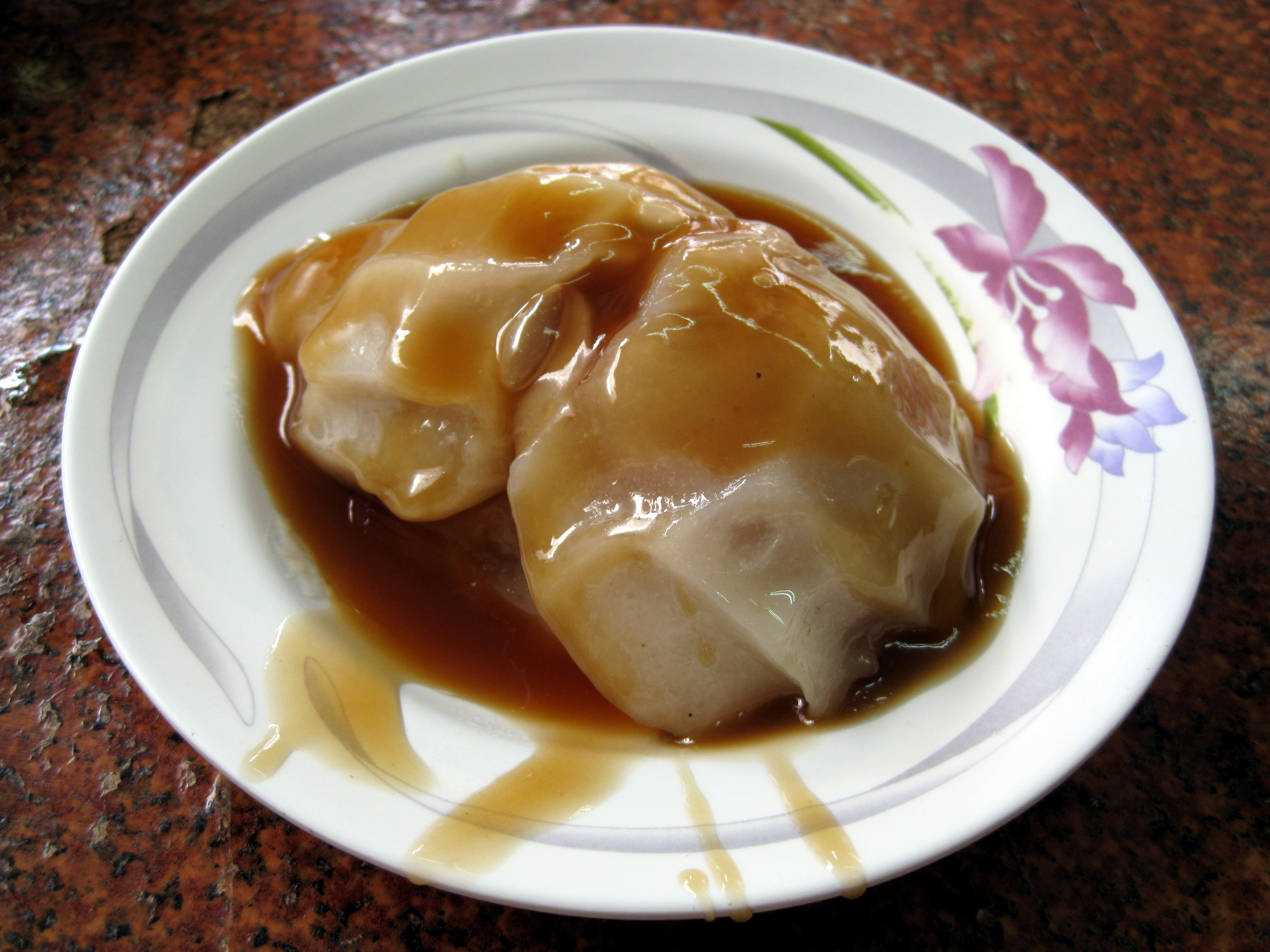
Ba-wan is a Taiwanese dumpling dish and snack food.

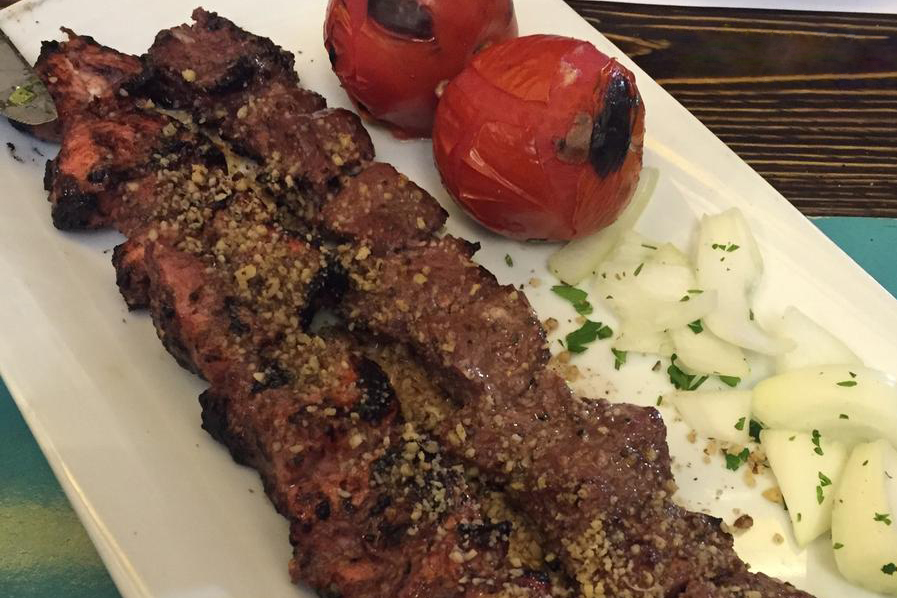
Kabab torsh is a kebab dish in areas of Iran.

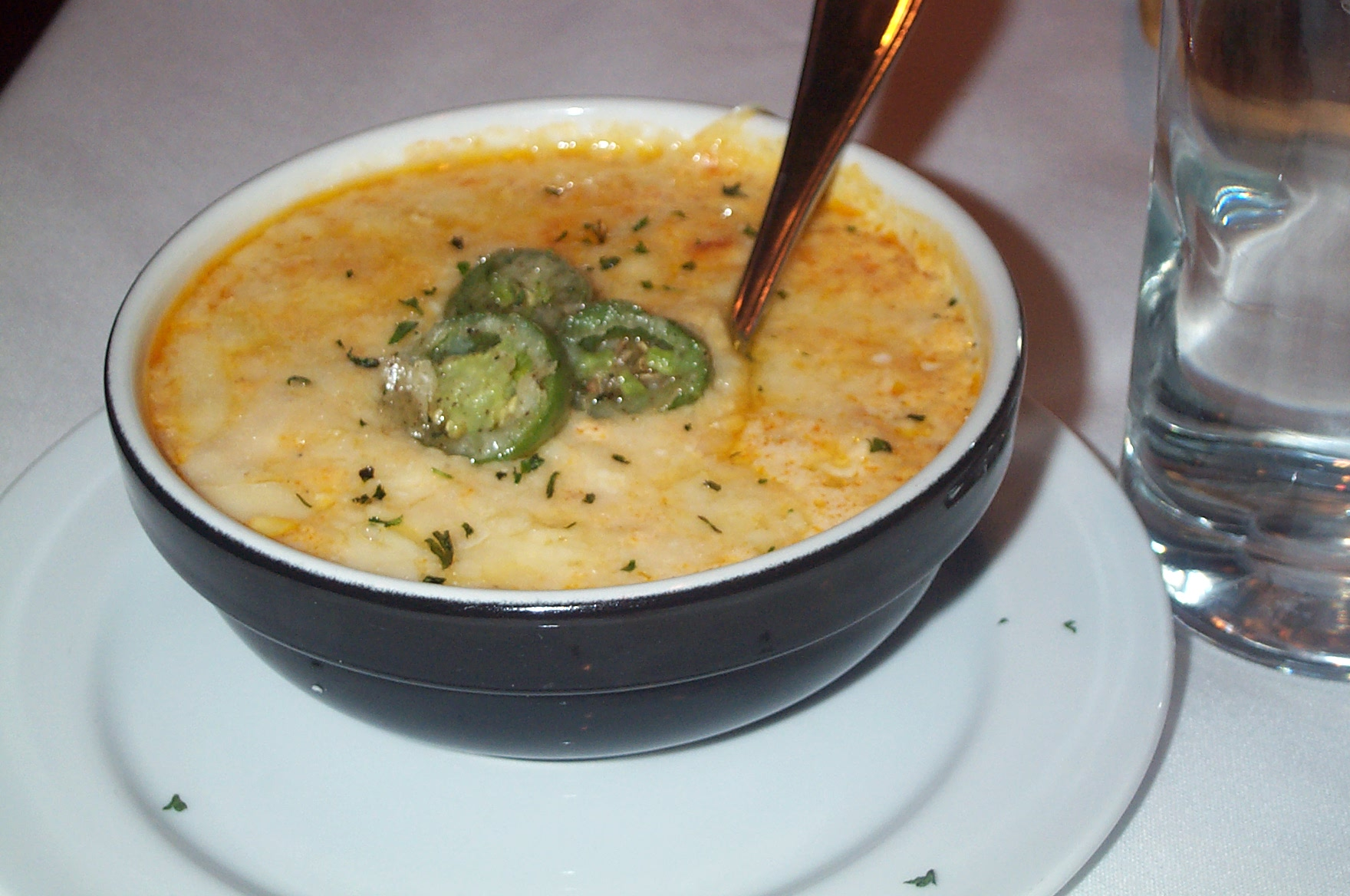
Creamed corn is a maize dish in the form of a soup or sauce made by pulping the corn kernels and collecting the milky residue from the corn.

- List of almond dishes
- List of ancient dishes
- List of bacon substitutes
- List of baked goods
- List of breakfast drinks
- List of breakfast cereals
- List of breakfast foods
- List of cakes
- List of candies
- List of casserole dishes
- List of cheeses
  - List of brined cheeses
- List of chickpea dishes
- List of chocolate bar brands
- List of chocolate-covered foods
- List of Christmas dishes
- List of coconut dishes
- List of condiments
- List of brand name condiments
- List of confectionery
- List of confectionery brands
- List of dishes using coconut milk
- List of coffee dishes
- List of common dips
- List of custard desserts
- List of cookies
- List of deep fried foods
- List of desserts
- List of doughnut varieties
- List of dried foods
- List of dumplings
- List of egg dishes
- List of fast foods
- List of fermented foods
- List of fermented soy products
- List of fish sauces
- List of food pastes
- List of foods made from maple
- List of fried dough foods
- List of goat dishes
- List of halal fish
- List of hors d'oeuvre
- List of hot dogs
- List of kebabs
- List of kosher foods
- List of legume dishes
- List of maize dishes
- List of meat substitutes
- List of military food topics
- List of mushroom dishes
- List of noodles
- List of noodle dishes
- List of pancakes
- List of pasta
- List of pastries
- List of pickled foods
- List of pies, tarts and flans
- List of poppy seed pastries and dishes
- List of porridges
- List of puddings
- List of rice dishes
- List of rolled foods
- List of sandwiches
  - List of American sandwiches
- List of sauces
- List of snack foods by country
- List of snack foods
- List of soul foods and dishes
- List of soy-based foods
- List of spreads
- List of street food
- List of stuffed dishes
- List of syrups
- List of tapas
- List of twice-baked foods

=== Breads ===
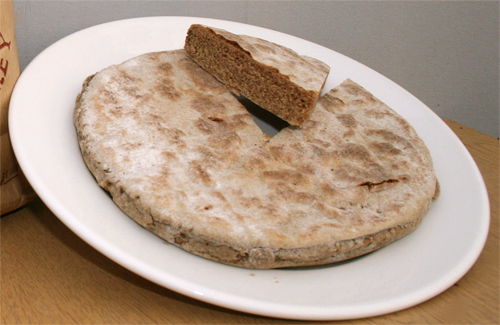
Traditional beremeal bannock, as made in Orkney, Scotland. This is a British bread dish. The separated sector is a scone.

- List of breads
  - List of American breads
  - List of brand name breads
  - List of bread rolls
  - List of buns
  - List of British breads
  - List of Indian breads
  - List of sweet breads
  - List of Pakistani breads
  - List of quick breads
  - List of sourdough breads
- List of bread dishes
- List of toast dishes

=== Dairy-based ===
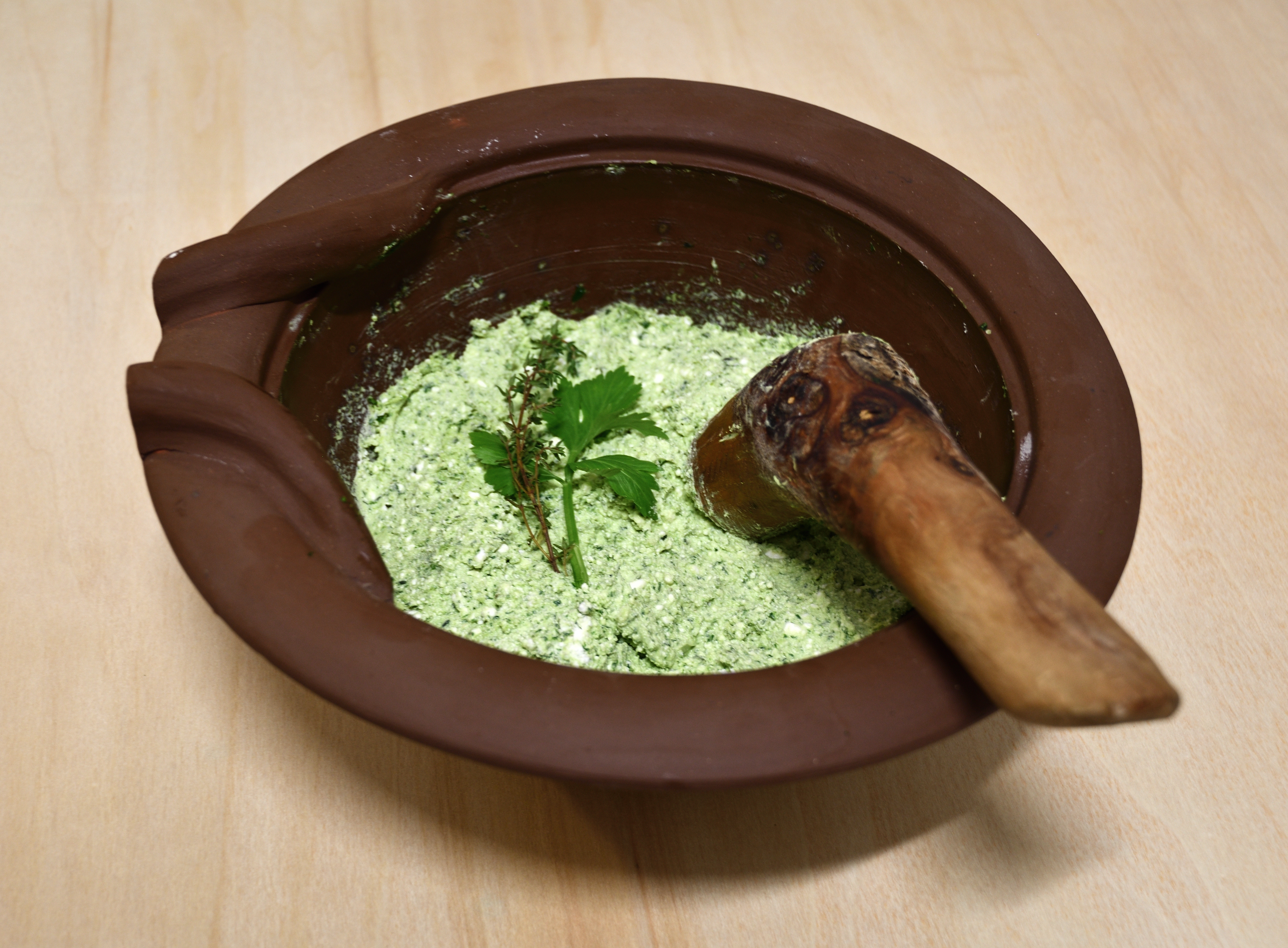
Moretum is a cheese dish consisting of an herb cheese spread that the Ancient Romans ate with bread.

- Butter dishes
- Cheese dishes
  - Fondues
- Cheeses
  - Brined
- Yogurt-based

=== Fish and seafood ===
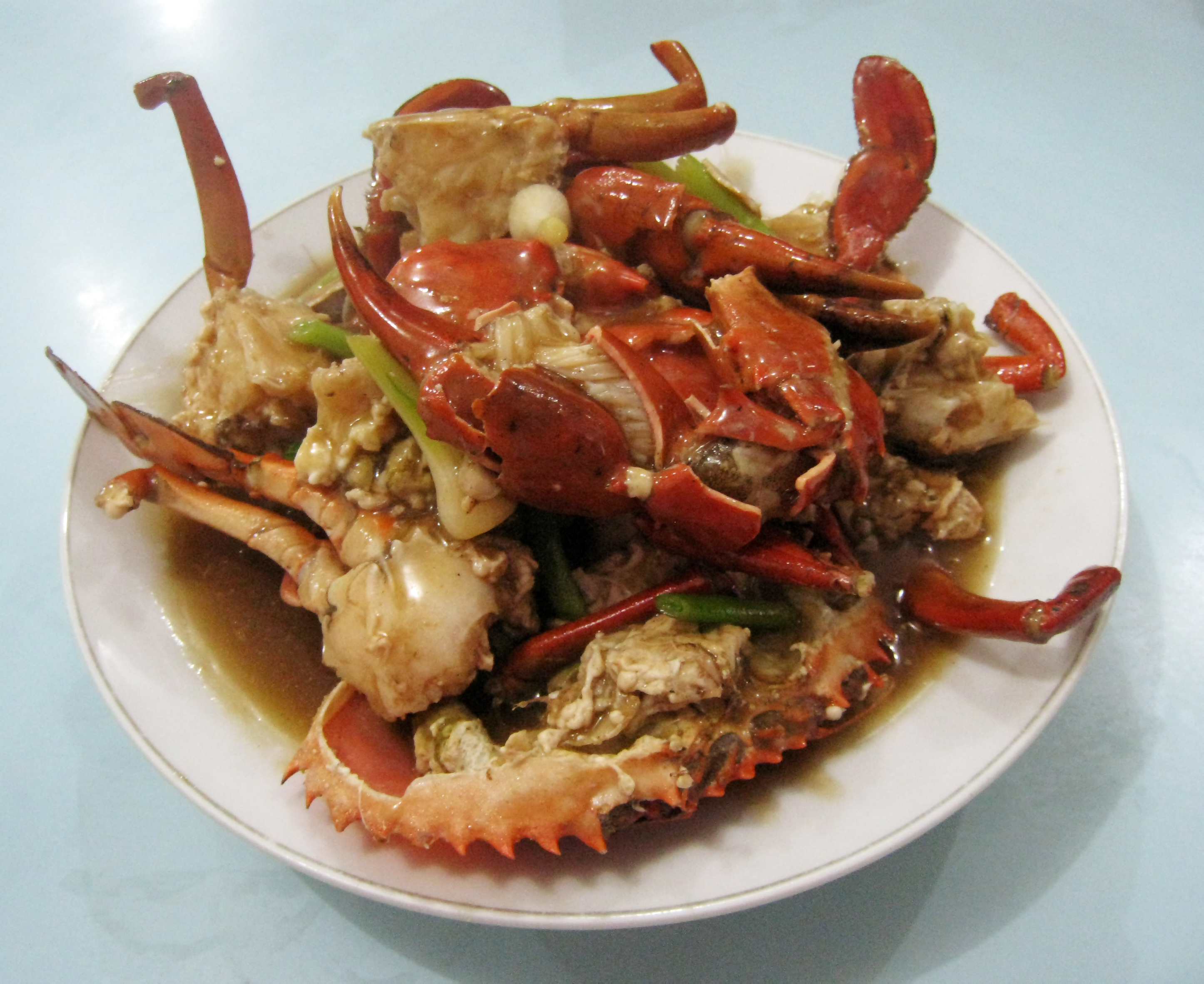
Kepiting saus tiram is a Chinese-Indonesian crab dish.

- Clam
- Cod
- Crab
- Fish head
- Fish stews
- Fried fish
- Herring
- Raw fish
- Salmon
- Shrimp
- Sushi and sashimi
- Tuna

=== Fruits and vegetables ===
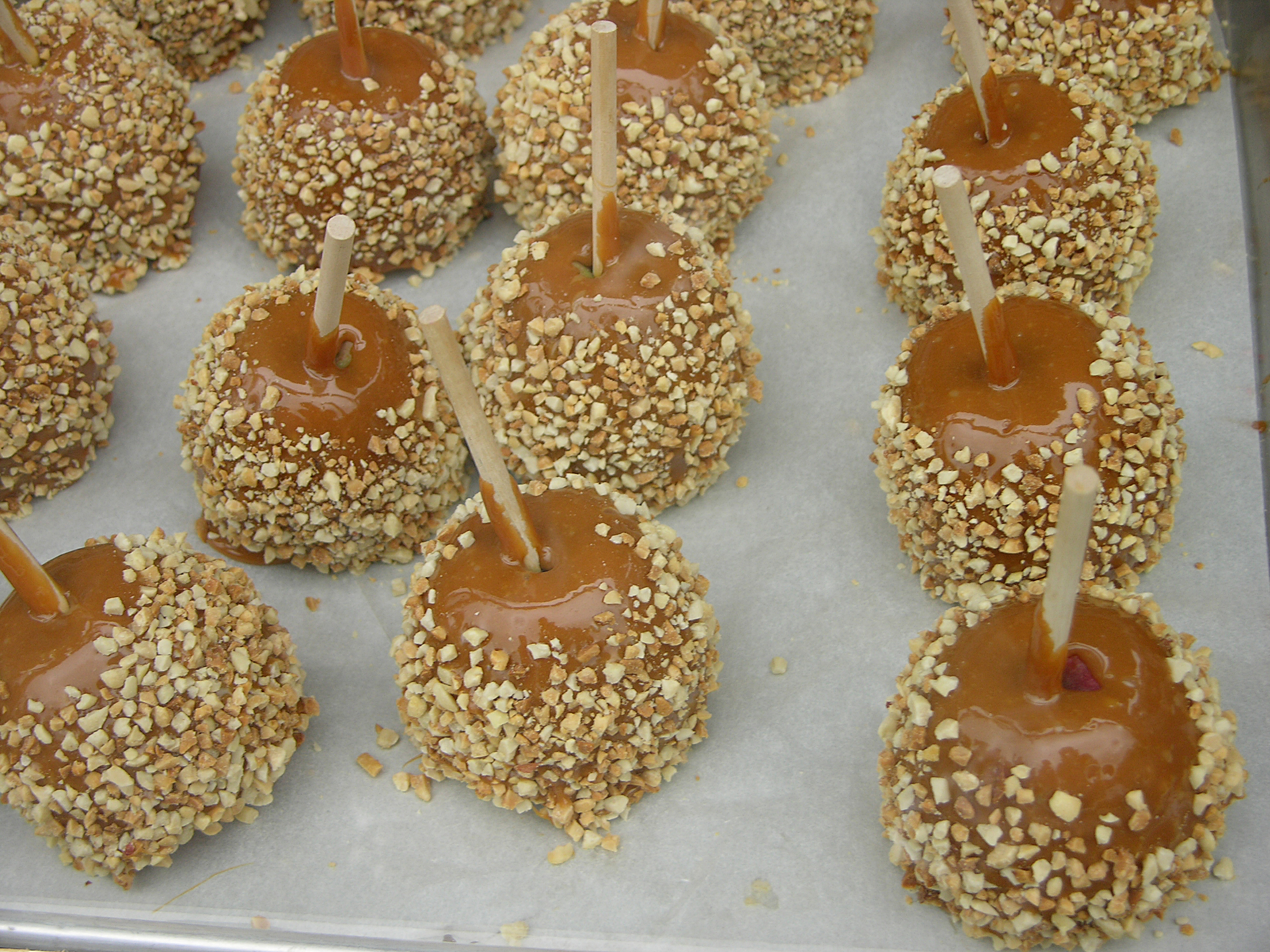
The caramel apple is an apple dish.

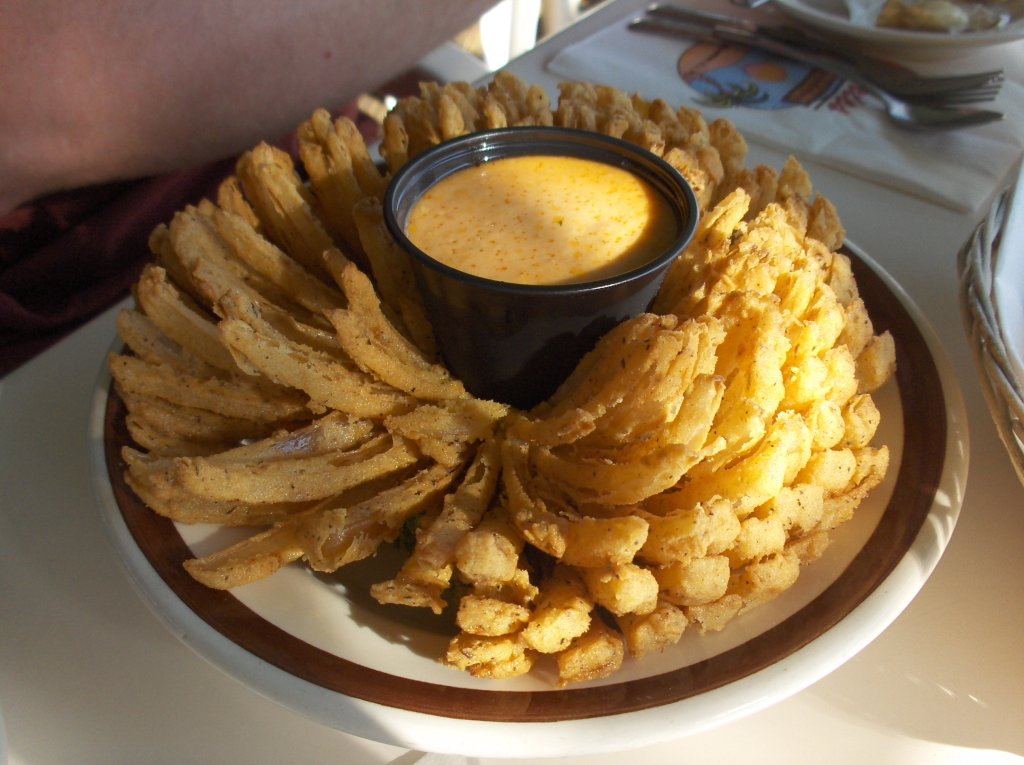
The blooming onion is an onion dish.

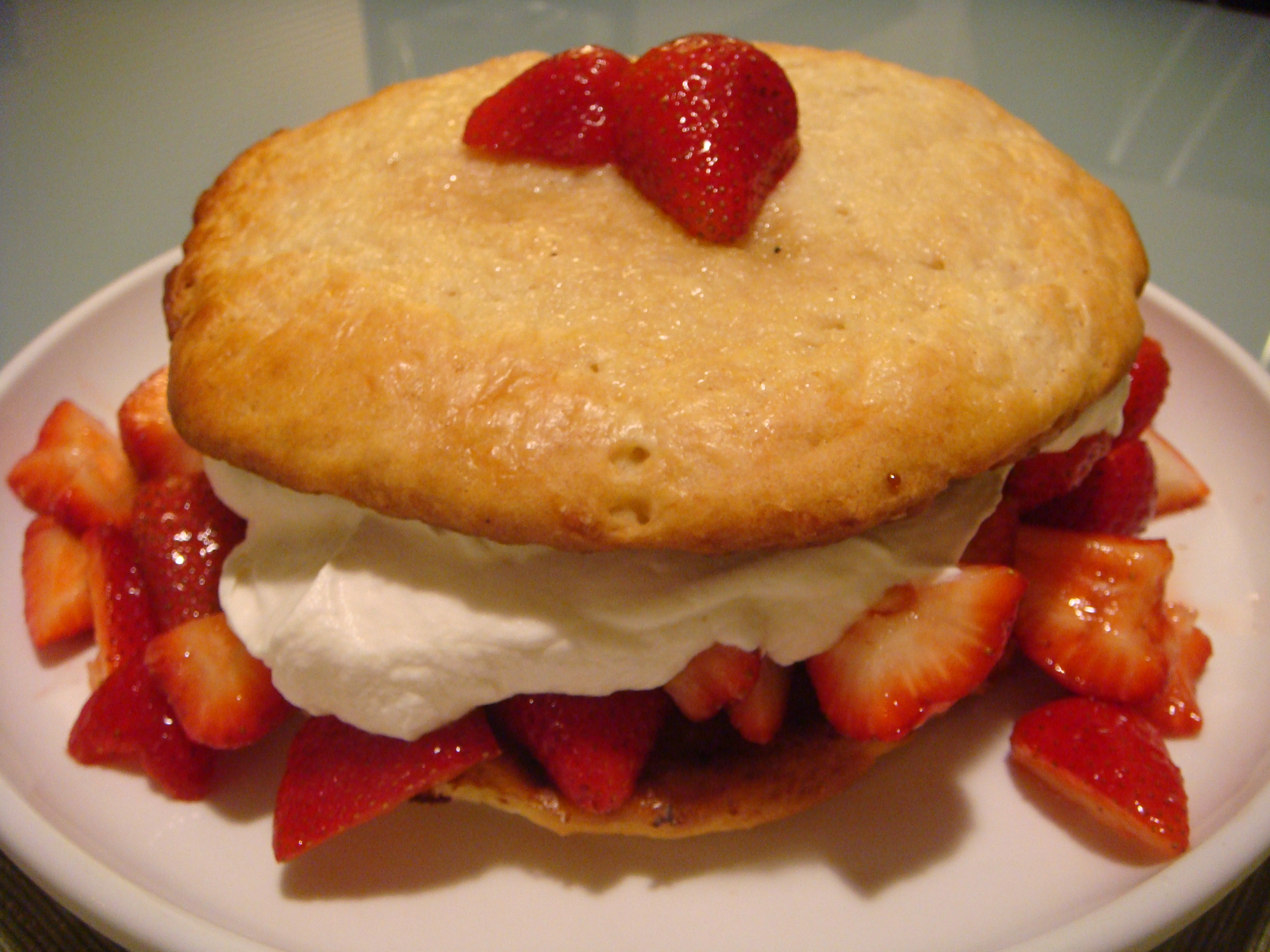
Strawberry shortcake is a strawberry dish.

- Apple
- Avocado
- Banana
- Cabbage
- Carrot
- Cassava
- Cherry
- Eggplant
- Garlic
- Grape
- Lemon
- Melon
- Onion
- Plum
- Potato
  - French fry
- Salads
  - Arab
  - Thai
- Soy-based
- Squash and pumpkin
- Strawberry
- Sweet potato
- Tofu
- Tomato

=== Meat dishes ===
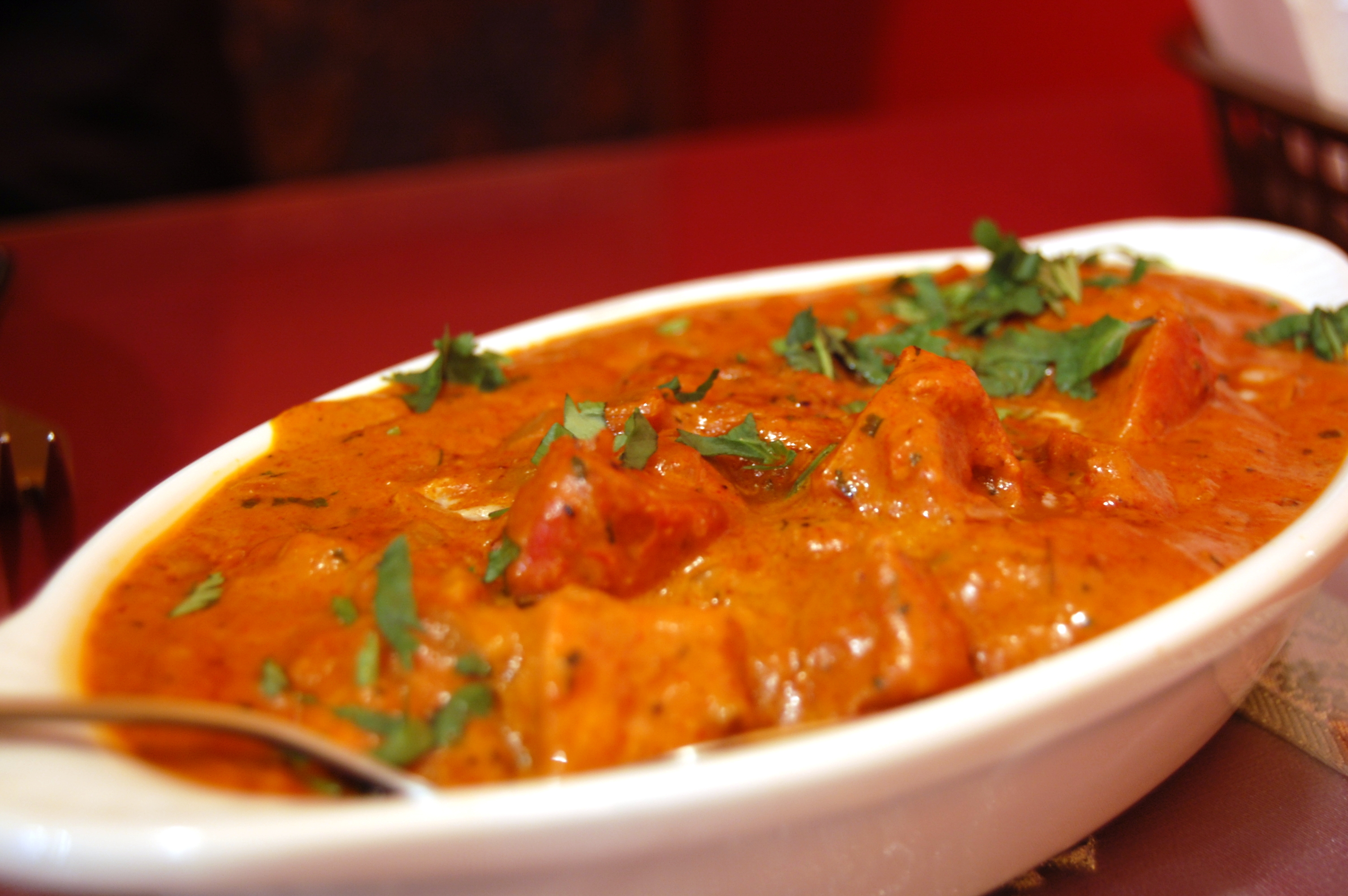
Butter chicken is an Indian chicken dish made with mildly spiced tomato sauce.

- List of meat dishes
  - List of bacon dishes
  - List of beef dishes
    - List of steak dishes
  - List of hamburgers
  - List of pork dishes
  - List of sausages
  - List of sausage dishes
  - List of veal dishes
  - List of chicken dishes

=== Soups and stews ===
==== By type ====
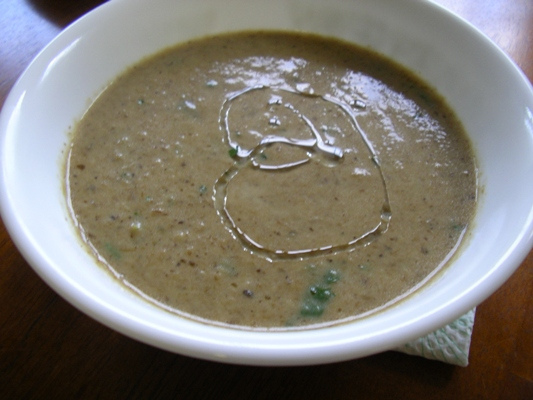
Cream of mushroom soup is a cream soup.

- Bean
- Blood
- Cheese
- Cream
- Fish and seafood
- Vegetable

==== By type and origin ====
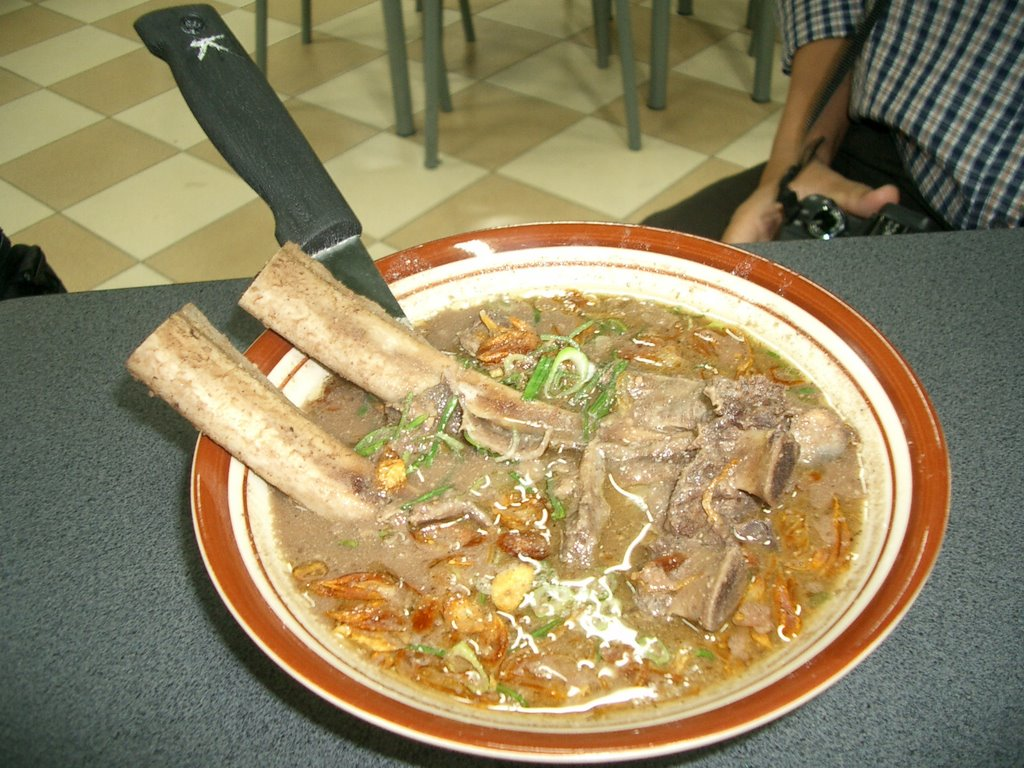
Konro is an Indonesian rib soup originating with the Makassarese people of South Sulawesi.

- Chinese
- Filipino
- French
- German
- Indonesian
- Italian
- Japanese
- Pakistani
- Spanish

== See also ==
- Lists of foods
- Lists of food and beverage topics
- List of cuisines
- List of lists of lists
