= List of breweries in Oklahoma =

This is a list of breweries in Oklahoma, a U.S. state.

== History ==
Brewing in Tulsa dates back to the late 1930s with the Ahrens Brewing Company and their Ranger Beer line. The Ahrens Brewing Company opened in May 1938 as a large scale production brewery which employed more than 30 people at its onset. Their Ranger Beer, Ranger Special Brew, and Ranger Winter Brew were popular among Tulsans of the time; however the brewery experienced only a short existence. They were forced into bankruptcy in February 1940. The details of what went wrong with the brewery have been lost over time, but it is believed that the Ahrens were put out of business by “unfair” practices from the breweries in Oklahoma City.

The number of new breweries opening and in planning has increased recently in Oklahoma.

== Breweries ==
- (405) Brewing Co. (closed) – Norman
- American Solera – Tulsa
- Angry Scotsman Brewing – Oklahoma City
- Anthem Brewing Company – Oklahoma City
- BierKraft – McAlester
- Battered Boar Brewing Company (closed) – Oklahoma City
- Black Mesa Brewing Company (closed) – Norman
- Broken Arrow Brewing Company – Broken Arrow
- Cabin Boys Brewing – Tulsa
- Choc Beer Company – Krebs
- COOP Ale Works – Oklahoma City
- Dead Armadillo Craft Brewing – Tulsa
- Duckie's Woodfire – Oklahoma City
- Elk Valley Brewing Company (closed) – Oklahoma City
- Frenzy Brewing Company – Edmond
- Heirloom Rustic Ales – Tulsa
- High Gravity Brewing Company – Tulsa
- Huebert Brewing Company – Oklahoma City
- Iron Monk Brewing Company – Stillwater
- Kochendorfer Brewing Co. - Duncan
- Lazy Circles Brewing – Norman
- Marshall Brewing Company – Tulsa
- Mustang Brewing Company (closed) – Oklahoma City
- New Era: Fine Fermentations – Tulsa
- Nothing's Left Brewing Company – Tulsa
- Okie Beer Co. – Oklahoma City
- Prairie Artisan Ales – Tulsa
- Redbud Brewing Company – Oklahoma City
- Renaissance Brewing Company – Tulsa
- Roughtail Brewing Company – Oklahoma City
- SkyDance Brewing CompanyOklahoma's first Native American-owned brewing company – Oklahoma City & – Midwest City
- Stonecloud Brewing Company – Oklahoma City
- The Big Friendly – Oklahoma City
- Welltown Brewing – Tulsa

== Brewpubs ==
- Belle Isle Restaurant and Brewing Company – Oklahoma City
- Bricktown Brewery – Oklahoma City
- Mountain Fork Brewery – Broken Bow
- Pete's Place – Krebs
- Royal Bavaria – Moore
- OAK & ORE Craft Beer Taproom - Oklahoma City

== See also ==
- Beer in the United States
- List of breweries in the United States
- List of microbreweries
