= List of breweries in South Carolina =

This is a list of breweries in South Carolina, a U.S. state. Some of these microbreweries also operate brewpubs, serving food as well as beer. On June 2, 2014, Governor Nikki Haley signed the "Stone Bill" which allowed production breweries to serve food, and eradicated consumption restrictions which previously limited patrons to 48 ounces per customer. As of 2021, there are 123 breweries operating across the state. Palmetto Brewery is the oldest and largest in the state.

| Brewery | Location | Year opened |
|---|---|---|
| 13 Stripes Brewery | Taylors | 2017 |
| Amor Artis Brewing | Fort Mill | 2018 |
| Birds Fly South Ale Project (closed) | Greenville | 2016 |
| Brewery 85 (closed) | Greenville | 2014 |
| Charles Towne Fermentory | Charleston | 2016 |
| COAST Brewing Co. | North Charleston | 2007 |
| Columbia Craft Brewing Company (closed) | Columbia | 2017 |
| Commonhouse Aleworks | North Charleston | 2018 |
| Cooper River Brewing Company | Charleston | 2015 |
| Crooked Hammock Brewery | North Myrtle Beach | |
| Ciclops Cyderi & Brewery | Spartanburg | 2015 |
| DoubleStamp Brewery | Greenville | 2018 |
| Edmund's Oast Brewing Co. | Charleston | 2014 |
| Fam's Brewing Co. | Charleston | 2017 |
| Fatty's Beer Works | Charleston | 2017 |
| Fireforge Crafted Beer | Greenville | 2018 |
| Freehouse Brewery | North Charleston | 2013 |
| Frothy Beard Brewing Company | Charleston | 2013 |
| Grand Strand Brewing Company | Myrtle Beach | |
| Greener Pastures Brewing Company | Camden | 2025 |
| Hilton Head Brewing Company | Hilton Head Island | 1994 |
| Holliday Brewing | Inman | 2017 |
| Holy City Brewing | North Charleston | 2011 |
| Hunter-Gatherer Brewery | Columbia | 1995 |
| Legal Remedy Brewing | Rock Hill | 2015 |
| LO-Fi Brewing | Charleston | 2013 |
| Low Tide Brewing | Johns Island | 2016 |
| Magnetic South Brewing | Anderson; Greenville | 2021; 2023 |
| Munkle Brewing Co. | Charleston | 2016 |
| New Groove Artisan Brewery | Boiling Springs | 2015 |
| New Realm Brewing Company | Greenville; Charleston | |
| New South Brewing | Myrtle Beach | 1998 |
| Palmetto Brewing Co. (closed) | Charleston | 1993 |
| Pawleys Island Brewing Company | North Charleston | 2016 |
| Peak Drift Brewing Company | Columbia | 2021 |
| Plankroad Brewing Co. | Spartanburg | 2018 |
| Revelry Brewing Co. | Charleston | 2014 |
| River Dog Brewing Company | Ridgeland | 2012 |
| River Rat Brewing (closed) | Columbia | 2013 |
| RJ Rockers Brewing Company | Spartanburg | 1997 |
| Rusty Bull Brewing Company | North Charleston | 2017 |
| Salt Marsh Brewing Company | Bluffton | 2013 |
| Seminar Brewing | Florence | 2010 |
| Shoeless Brewing Company | Greenville | 2018 |
| Southern Growl Beer Company | Greer | 2014 |
| Steel Hands Brewing | Cayce | 2018 |
| Tetrad Brewing Co. | Greenville | 2020 |
| Thomas Creek Brewing Company | Greenville | 1998 |
| Tidal Creek Brewhouse | Myrtle Beach | |
| Tradesman Brewing Company | Charleston | 2014 |
| Westbrook Brewing Company | Mount Pleasant | 2010 |
| Wild Heart Brewing Company | Hartsville | 2021 |
| Yee-Haw Brewing Company | Greenville | 2017 |

== See also ==
- Beer in the United States
- List of breweries in the United States
- List of microbreweries
