= List of breweries in the United States Virgin Islands =

The following is a list of United States Virgin Islands-based breweries.

Brewery	Location	Description
Brew STX	Christiansted, St. Croix	Restaurant and brewery located on the boardwalk in downtown Christiansted.
Frenchtown Brewing Company	Frenchtown, St. Thomas	3 Barrel Nano Brewery in the bohemian fishing village of Frenchtown on the island of St. Thomas. Tours, tastings and growler fills are available to the public. Opened in 2015.
Leatherback Brewing Company	William Roebuck Industrial Park, St. Croix and Havensight Plaza, St. Thomas	Breweries and tasting rooms on St. Croix and on St. Thomas. Beer is canned and kegged on site in St. Croix.
Rock City Brewing Company	Havensight Mall, St. Thomas	Brewery located Havensight, sold at The Tap & Still restaurant locations at Havensight, St. Thomas; Red Hook, St Thomas; Cruz Bay, St John; and Simpson Bay, Sint Maarten.
St. John Brewers	Cruz Bay, St. John	Founded in 2004, restaurant and taproom offers a rotating draft selection of St John Brewers beers, hard seltzers and sodas. Produces Love City Hard Seltzer.

== See also ==
- List of microbreweries
