= Lazy Magnolia Brewing Company =

American brewing company

Lazy Magnolia Brewing Company, LLC
- Type: Private Limited Company
- Industry: Alcoholic beverage
- Founded: 2003
- Founder: Mark & Leslie Henderson
- Headquarters: Kiln, Mississippi, United States
- Products: Beer
- Owner: Leslie Henderson, Mark Henderson
- Website: www.lazymagnolia.com

Lazy Magnolia Brewing Company is an American brewing company based in Kiln, Mississippi.

== Brief history ==
Lazy Magnolia Brewing Company was founded by Mark and Leslie Henderson. Leslie entered the American Brewers Guild Brewing School in July 2003 and began an apprenticeship at Crescent City Brewhouse in the spring of 2004. In September 2004, a building for Lazy Magnolia Brewing Company was secured and brewing equipment was delivered in October. By December, the company was fully operational. In January 2005, the first batch of beer was brewed on the Lazy Magnolia system. The first kegs of beer entered the market on the Gulf Coast in March 2005. Operations were briefly shut down and the couple's home was destroyed by Hurricane Katrina in September 2005. By October of the same year, the brewery had resumed operations.

By early 2007, the company was selling kegs of beer to bars and restaurants in Mississippi. In December 2007, the company began selling bottled beer. Lazy Magnolia Brewing Company has more than 90 types of beer.

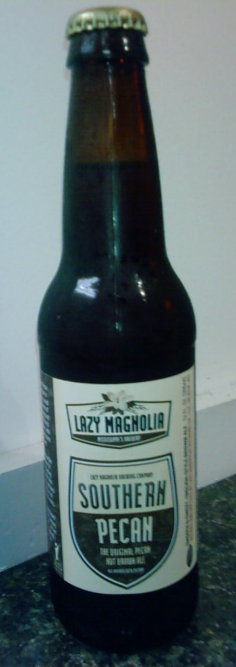
Lazy Magnolia's Southern Pecan beer.

== Rat infestation ==
In March 2019, Lazy Magnolia briefly received a C health grade due to a rodent infestation. Rat feces were found in both the taproom kitchen and in the brewing area.
