= Millstream Brewing =

American brewery

Millstream Brewing Company
- Founded: 1985
- Headquarters: Amana, Iowa; United States
- Owner: Privately Held

Millstream Brewing is a small American brewery founded in 1985 by Carroll F. Zuber and brothers James Roemig and Dennis Roemig in Amana Colonies Iowa.

== History ==
Millstream Brewing Company was established in the fall of 1985 in The Amana Colonies by locals Carrol Zuber and brothers James and Dennis Roemig. Joseph Pickett designed the brewery and created the original recipes. Originally Millstream's only products consisted of the Millstream Lager and the Schild Brau Amber. In 2001 three employees formed a partnership and purchased the brewery. Since that time Millstream has continued to grow and expand their product line, now offering almost 15 different beers throughout the year and two types of Soda.

== Beers ==
- Schild Brau Amber
- German Pilsner
- Windmill Wheat
- Back Road Stout
- Iowa Pale Ale
- John's Generations White Ale
- Oktoberfest Märzen
- Heferweissen
- Schokolade Bock
- Rock Bock

== Sodas ==
- Root Beer
- Old Time Cream Soda
- Orange Cream Soda

== Awards ==
=== Schild Brau ===
Year	Competition	Style	Medal Awarded
1987	GABF	Vienna Style Lager	Silver
1989	GABF	European Ambers	Gold
1991	GABF	Amber/Viennas	Silver
2003	GABF	Vienna Style Lager	Bronze
2003	NABA	Märzen-Oktoberfest	Bronze
2004	GABF	Vienna Style Lager	Silver
2005	NABA	Märzen-Oktoberfest	Gold
2005	NABA	German Lagers-Vienna	Gold
2005	GABF	Vienna Style Lager	Bronze
2006	NABA	German Lagers-Vienna	Gold
2006	GABF	Vienna Style Lager	Bronze
2007	NABA	German Lagers-Vienna	Bronze
2009	NABA	German Lagers-Vienna	Gold
2010	NABA	German Lagers-Vienna	Bronze
2010	World Beer Cup	Vienna-Style Lager	Gold

=== Millstream Wheat ===
Year	Competition	Style	Medal Awarded
1990	GABF	American Wheats	Gold

=== German Pilsner ===
Year	Competition	Style	Medal Awarded
2010	NABA	German Pilsner	Silver
2010	LA International Commercial Beer Comp	German Pilsner	Gold

=== Back Road Stout ===
Year	Competition	Style	Medal Awarded
2010	LA International Commercial Beer Comp	Oatmeal Stout	Gold

== Location ==
Millstream Brewing Company is located in Amana, Iowa.
