= Marshall Brewing Company =

- Industry: Alcoholic beverage
- Founded: 2008
- Headquarters: Tulsa, Oklahoma, USA
- Products: Beer
- Production output: 4,000 US barrels
- Owner: Eric Marshall

Marshall Brewing Company is a brewery in Tulsa, Oklahoma, USA. It opened in 2008 in a 7,300-square-foot (680 m^{2}) facility outside downtown Tulsa, Oklahoma. It is the first commercial brewing facility in Tulsa since World War II. The brewery produced about 1,200 US beer barrels (140,000 L; 37,000 US gal; 31,000 imp gal) in 2009 and 2,000 US beer barrels (230,000 L; 62,000 US gal; 52,000 imp gal) in 2010. Currently, Marshall Brewing offers several year-round core beers, including Atlas IPA, Sundown Wheat, This Land Lager, Dunkel, Volks Pilsner, and This Machine Belgian-Style IPA. Outside of their core brands, Marshall Brewing offers over 30+ Seasonal beers throughout the year, including some only available at their Tulsa Tap Room, located at 1742 E 6th Street.

Their beers are available at bars, restaurants, liquor stores, and (as of Oct 1st, 2018) at Grocery and Gas Stations throughout the state of Oklahoma, as well as in select locations in Arkansas. Previously, Marshall distributed beers in Kansas and Missouri.

== Seasonal beers ==
In addition to the core offering, Marshall Brewing has also released several seasonal brews.

Season	Beer	Style
Winter	Big Jamoke Porter	American Robust Porter
Spring	Revival Red Ale	American Red Ale
Summer	Arrowhead Pale Ale	American Pale Ale
Fall	Oktoberfest	Oktoberfestbier / Märzen
