= List of breweries in West Virginia =

The following is a list of West Virginia-based breweries

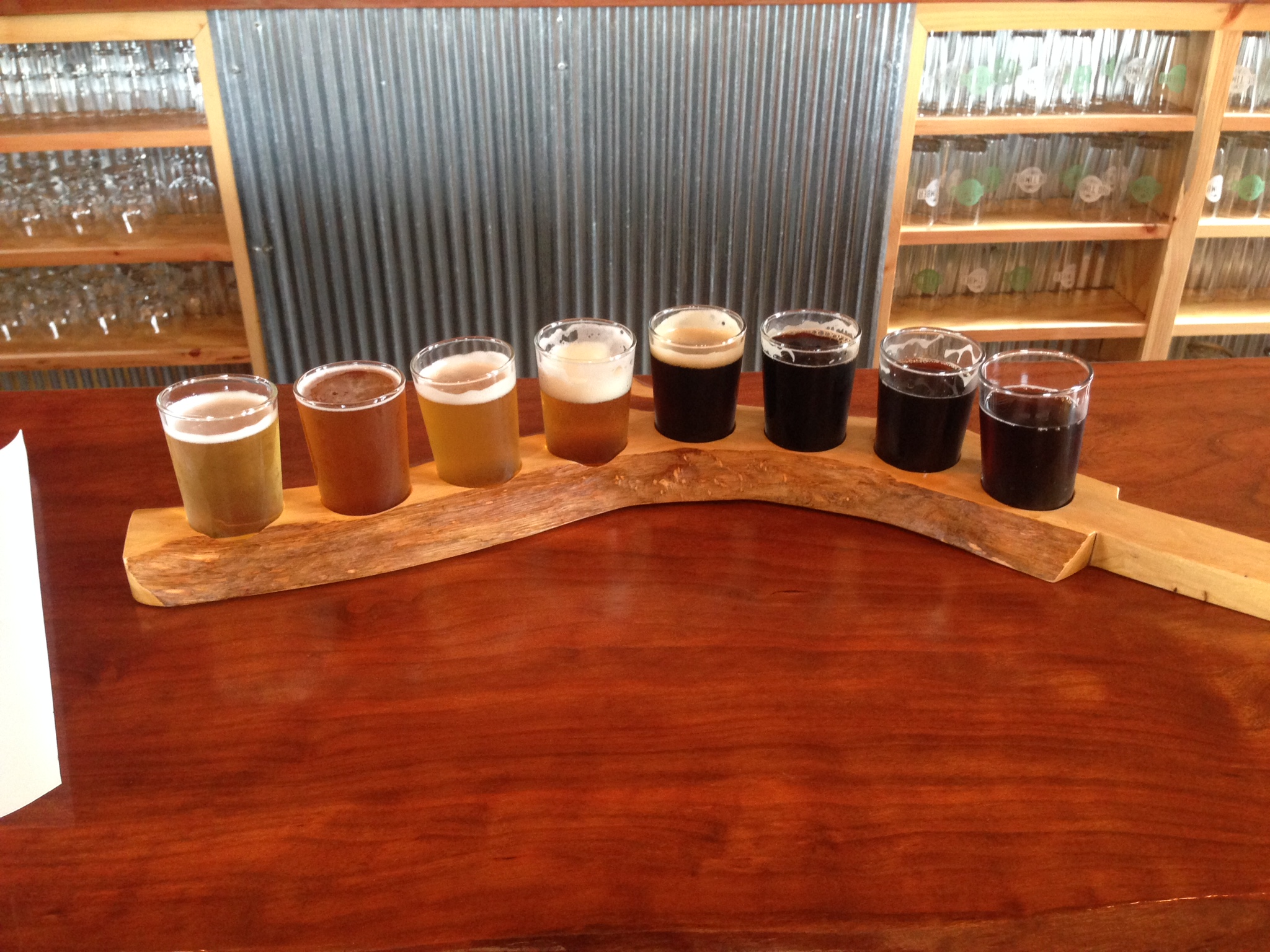
Flight at Big Timber Brewing

Brewery	Location	Description
Big Timber Brewing	Elkins	Taproom
Bridge Brew Works	Fayetteville	Brewery Taproom
Greenbrier Valley Brewing Co.	Lewisburg	Brewery taproom
Morgantown Brewing Company	Morgantown	Taproom and restaurant
Mountain State Brewing Company	Morgantown, Thomas, Bridgeport	Taproom in Thomas; Restaurants in Morgantown and Bridgeport
North End Tavern & Brewery	Parkersburg	Est. 1899 – Taproom and restaurant
Parkersburg Brewing Company	Parkersburg	Taproom and restaurant
Short Story Brewing	Rivesville	Taproom and restaurant
Stumptown Ales	Davis	Taproom, limited food menu

The website BrilliantStream.com maintains a current listing of all licensed, active West Virginia breweries, their addresses and contact info, as well as, keeps a listing of WV brewery projects in development.

== See also ==
- List of microbreweries
