= Beer style =

Types of beer

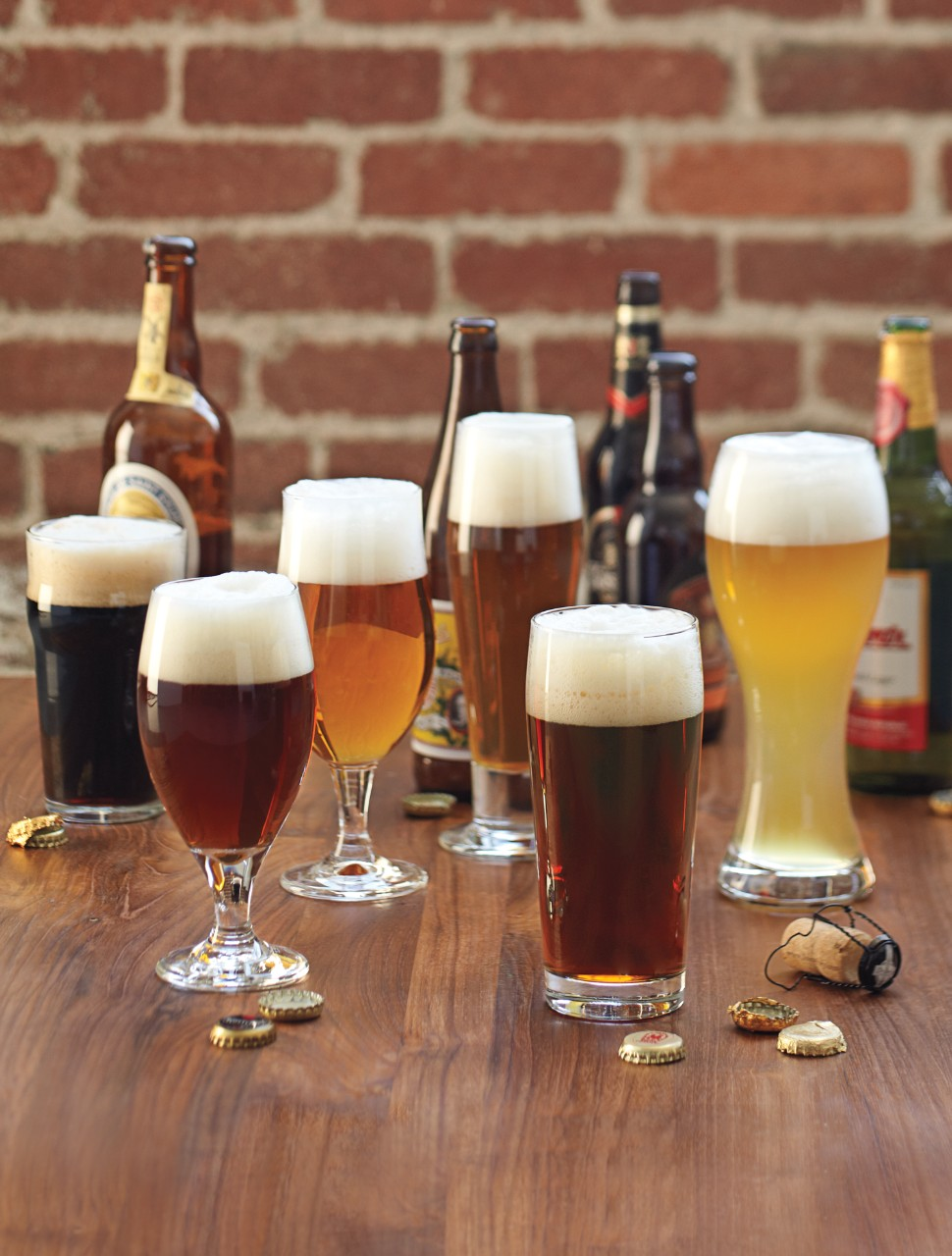
Various styles of beer

Beer styles differentiate and categorise beers by colour, flavour, strength, ingredients, production method, recipe, history, or origin.

The modern concept of beer styles is largely based on the work of writer Michael Jackson in his 1977 book The World Guide To Beer. In 1989, Fred Eckhardt furthered Jackson's work publishing The Essentials of Beer Style. Although the systematic study of beer styles is a modern phenomenon, the practice of distinguishing between different varieties of beer is ancient, dating to at least 2000 BC.

What constitutes a beer style may involve provenance, local tradition, ingredients, aroma, appearance, flavour and mouthfeel. The flavour may include the degree of bitterness of a beer due to bittering agents such as hops, roasted barley, or herbs; and the sweetness from the sugar present in the beer.

== Types ==
Many beer styles are classified as one of two main types, ales and lagers, though certain styles may not be easily sorted into either category. Beers classified as ales are typically made with yeasts that ferment at warmer temperatures, usually between 15.5 and 24 °C (60 and 75 °F), and form a layer of foam on the surface of the fermenting beer. Thus, they are called top-fermenting yeasts. Lagers utilise yeasts that ferment at considerably lower temperatures, around 10 °C (50 °F), and can process raffinose, a complex sugar created during fermentation. These yeasts collect at the bottom of the fermenting beer and are therefore referred to as bottom-fermenting yeasts. Lagers constitute the majority of beers in production today.

Some beers are spontaneously fermented from wild yeasts, for example the lambic beers of Belgium.

Additional markers are applied across styles. The terms "imperial" or "double" are used interchangeably for a higher-alcohol version of a particular style. Originally applied to imperial stouts, a high-alcohol style of stout brewed in England for export to Imperial Russia, the term “imperial” can now be applied to any style name to indicate a higher alcohol content. "Double", meaning the same thing, originated with the dubbel style of Trappist beers in the 19th century. Even higher alcohol-content beers can be labeled "triple" (from the Trappist tripel style) or even "quadrupel". Lower-than-standard alcohol content is often indicated by the term "session". For example, while India pale ales often have alcohol content around 6–7% abv, a "session India pale ale" often has alcohol content below 5%.

Barrel-aged beer is aged in wood barrels. Sour beer is made with additional microorganisms (alongside yeast) such as Brettanomyces or Lactobacillus.

== History of beer styles ==
Styles of beer go back at least to Mesopotamia. The Alulu Tablet, a Sumerian receipt for "best" ale written in Cuneiform found in Ur, suggests that even in 2050 BC there was a differentiation between at least two different types or qualities of ale. The work of Bedřich Hrozný on translating Assyrian merchants' tablets found in Hattusa revealed that approximately 500 years later the Hittites had over 15 different types of beer.

Documents reveal comments on different local brewing methods or ingredients. Pliny the Elder in his Naturalis Historia wrote about Celts brewing ale "in Gaul and Spain in a number of different ways, and under a number of different names; although the principle is the same." Anglo-Saxon laws reveal they identified three different ales, while the Normans mention cervisae (ale) and plena cervisia (full bodied ale) in the Domesday Book.

By the 15th century brewers in Germany and the Low Countries were using hops to flavour and preserve their ale; this new style of ale was called beer. When this trend came to Britain and brewers of beer in Southwark, London, started to take sales away from the traditional brewers of unhopped ale, there were complaints and protests. Laws were passed favouring either beer or ale for a number of years, until hopped beer became the standard style throughout Europe. At the same time, brewers in Bavaria were storing beer in cool caves during the summer months to stop it from spoiling. The type of beer they stored in this manner became known as lager from the German word lagern, meaning "to store".

Although beers using naturally dried malt would have been pale-coloured, by the 17th century most malts in Europe would have been dried over a fire, resulting in a dark-coloured beer. When coke started to be used for roasting malt in 1642, the resulting lighter coloured beers became very popular. By 1703 the term pale ale was starting to be used, though the beer it described was a lightly hopped ale, very different from more bitter modern versions.

However, despite an awareness by commentators, law-makers, and brewers that there were different styles of beer, it was not until Michael Jackson's World Guide To Beer was published in 1977 that there was an attempt to group and compare beers from around the world. Jackson's book had a particular influence in North America where the writer Fred Eckhardt was also starting to explore the nature of beer styles. The wine importing company Merchant du Vin switched to importing beers mentioned in Jackson's book. Small brewers started up, producing copies and interpretations of the beer styles Jackson described.

While North America developed beer styles into a serious study with fixed parameters of bitterness, colour, aroma, yeast, ingredients and strength, other countries continued to mainly categorise beers loosely by strength and colour, with much overlapping of naming conventions.

== Elements of beer style ==
Beers may be categorised based on a number of factors.

=== Appearance ===
Color based on Standard Reference Method (SRM)
SRM/Lovibond	Example	Beer color	EBC
2	Pale lager, Witbier, Pilsener, Berliner Weisse		4
3	Maibock, Blonde Ale		6
4	Weissbier		8
6	American Pale Ale, India Pale Ale		12
8	Weissbier, Saison		16
10	English Bitter, ESB		20
13	Bière de Garde, Double IPA		26
17	Dark lager, Vienna lager, Märzen, Amber Ale		33
20	Brown Ale, Bock, Dunkel, Dunkelweizen		39
24	Irish Dry Stout, Doppelbock, Porter		47
29	Stout		57
35	Foreign Stout, Baltic Porter		69
40+	Imperial Stout		79

The visual characteristics that may be observed in a beer are colour, clarity, and nature of the head. Colour is usually imparted by the malts used, notably the adjunct malts added to darker beers, though other ingredients may contribute to the colour of some styles such as fruit beers. Colour intensity can be measured by systems such as EBC, SRM or Lovibond, but this information is rarely given to the public.

Many beers are transparent, but some beers, such as hefeweizen, may be cloudy due to the presence of yeast making them translucent. A third variety is the opaque or near-opaque colour that exists with stouts, porters, schwarzbiers (black beer) and other deeply coloured styles. Thickness and retention of the head and the lace it can leave on the glass, are also factors in a beer's appearance.

=== Aroma ===
The aroma in a beer may be formed from the malt and other fermentables, the strength and type of hops, the alcohol, esters, and various other aromatic components that can be contributed by the yeast strain, and other elements that may derive from the water and the brewing process.

=== Flavour ===
The taste characteristics of a beer may come from the type and amount of malt used, flavours imparted by the yeast, and the strength of bitterness. Bitterness can be measured on an International Bitterness Units scale, and in North America a number of brewers record the bitterness on this scale as IBUs.

=== Mouthfeel ===
The feel of a beer in the mouth, both from thickness of the liquid and from carbonation, may also be considered as part of a beer's style. A more dextrinous beer feels thicker in the mouth. The level of carbonation (or nitrogen, in "smooth" beers) varies from one beer style to another. For some beers it may give the beer a thick and creamy feel, while for others it contributes a prickly sensation.

=== Strength ===
The strength of beer is a general term for the amount of alcohol present. It can be quantified either indirectly by measurement of specific gravity, or more directly by other methods.

==== Gravity ====
Measurement of the specific gravity of the beer has been used to estimate the strength of beer by measuring its density. Several different scales have been used for the measurement of gravity, including the Plato, Baumé, Balling, and Brix scales, with the Plato scale being the most common modern measure.

This approach relies on the fact that dissolved sugars and alcohol each affect the density of beer differently. Since sugars are converted to alcohol during the process of fermentation, gravity can be used to estimate the final alcohol. In beer brewing, a distinction is made between the original gravity, the gravity of the wort before fermentation has begun, and the final gravity of the product when fermentation has completed. Since the concentration of sugars is directly proportional to the gravity, the original gravity gives a brewer an idea of the potential alcoholic strength of the final product. After fermentation, the differences between the final and original gravities indicate the amount of sugar converted into alcohol, allowing the concentration of alcoholic strength to be calculated.

The original gravity of a beer was the basis for determining taxation in both the UK and Ireland from 1880 until the late 20th century, and a legacy of that system remains in the largely arbitrary division of bitter into "bitter", "best bitter", and "special bitter" substyles. In continental Europe, the density of a beer in degrees Plato is sometimes used by a brewery to distinguish a particular beer produced in a line. For example, Rochefort Brewery produces three beers, all dissimilar in colour, flavour, and aroma; and sells them as Rochefort 6, Rochefort 8, and Rochefort 10, the numbers referring to the original gravities of the beers. Westvleteren Brewery, meanwhile, produces three beers and calls them Blonde, 8, and 12.

==== Alcohol concentration ====
Modern classification of the strength of alcoholic beverages for the purposes of taxation and regulation typically discriminates according to the percentage of alcohol by volume, generally abbreviated as abv. Additionally, although less common, some brewers throughout the world use also alcohol by weight (abw), particularly on low-point versions of popular domestic beer brands. At the relatively low alcohol concentrations of beer, the alcohol percentage by weight is roughly 4/5 of the abv (e.g., 3.2% abw is equivalent to 4.0% abv), but this becomes increasingly inaccurate as the alcohol concentration increases.

Before the development of modern brewing practices and the complete understanding of the biochemistry of yeast, the final abv of a beer could not be precisely controlled, making its value inconsistent and therefore unsuitable as a determinant for taxation or regulation. Contemporarily, though, abv is often used to determine the duty on beer and cider, and sales of beer and cider above a certain abv are sometimes restricted or prohibited. For example, in Texas, beers below 4% abv cannot be sold as stout regardless of other stylistic considerations.

=== Yeast ===
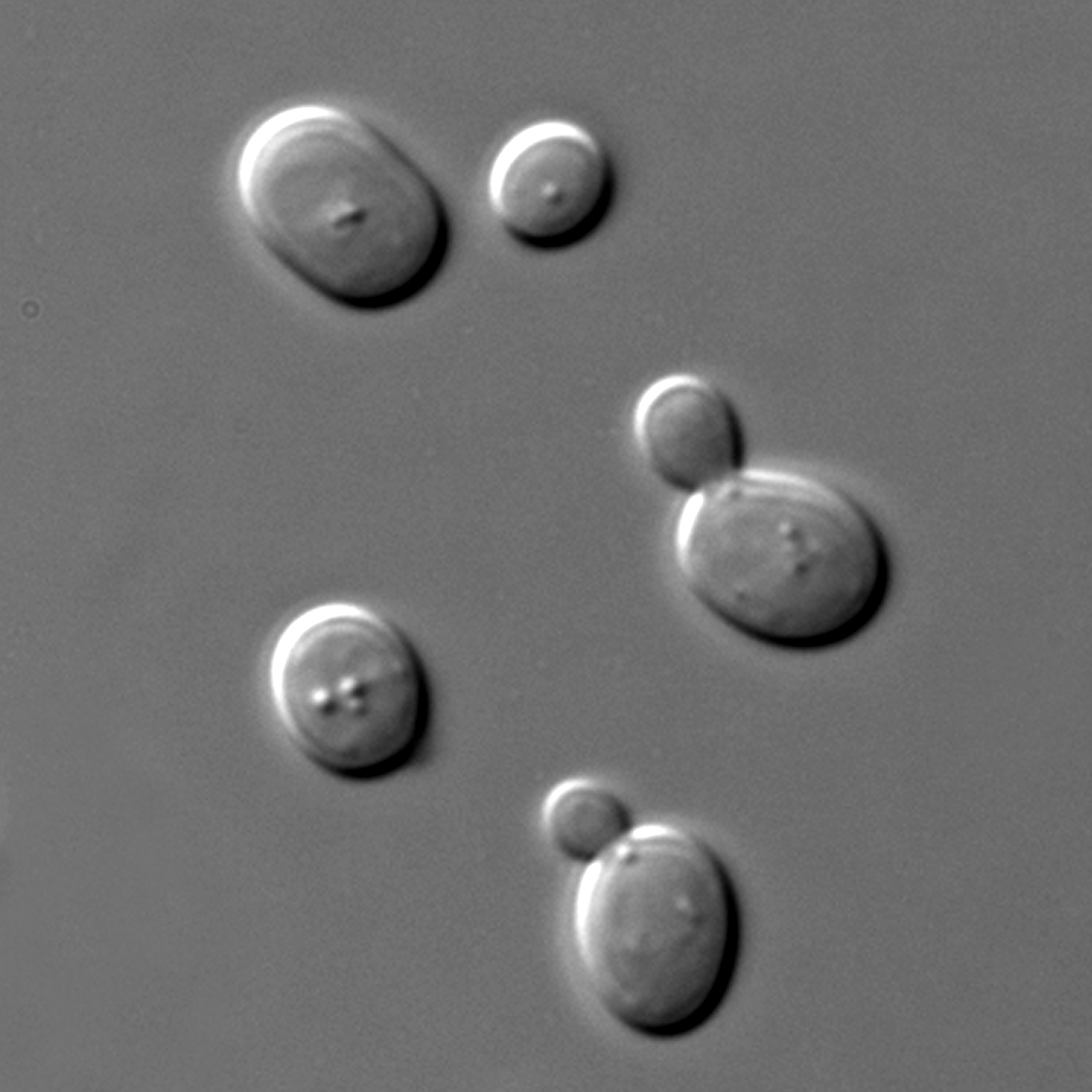
Saccharomyces cerevisiae yeast, used in brewing ale

A variety of yeasts are used in making beer, most of which are strains of either top-fermenting yeast or bottom-fermenting yeast. Different strains impart different flavour and aroma characteristics, and may vary in which complex sugars they can ferment and how high their alcohol tolerance is, both of which are factors in attenuation. Some beers use other microbes in addition to yeasts, such as Lactobacillus or Brettanomyces. For example, the distinctive flavour and aroma of Belgian Abbey ales largely result from the yeast strains used to ferment the beer. Different yeast strains also significantly shape beer’s sensory profile: ale yeasts (Saccharomyces cerevisiae) tend to produce fruity or spicy esters, while wild yeasts like Brettanomyces contribute earthy or funky notes. Proper yeast management is essential to prevent off-flavours such as sulphur compounds or inconsistent attenuation. There are a few modern styles, notably lambics, where spontaneous fermentation is used — that is, rather than being inoculated in a controlled fashion with a nurtured yeast, the unfermented wort is allowed to be colonised by microorganisms present in the environment.

=== Grains ===
The specific grains used in a particular beer is called the "grain bill". While just about any grain can be used, most beers use barley malt as their primary source of fermentable sugars, and some beer styles mandate it be used exclusively, such as those German styles developed under Reinheitsgebot. Some beer styles can be considered varietals, in the same sense as wine, based on their malt bill.

Kilned pale malts form the basis of most beer styles now in production, with styles that use other grains as a base distinguished by those grains (for example bock, which uses Munich malt as a base). The Rauchbier and Grätzer styles are distinguished by the use of smoked malt.

Some styles use one or more other grains as a key ingredient in the style, such as wheat beer, rye beer, or oatmeal stout.

The inclusion of some grains such as corn and rice is often viewed as making less of a flavour contribution and more of an added source of fermentable sugars. Rice in particular "is considered by many [craft] brewers what the nasty industrial brewers use to water down their beer".

This is due in large part to the use of rice by large scale American breweries. While it is commonly held that these breweries introduced these grains to their formulas during war shortages, author Maureen Ogle states "The mythology is that these giant beer makers began adding rice and corn to their beer after World War II to water it down, but that's simply not true. The American brewing industry was built in the late 19th century by first-generation German American immigrants such as Adolphus Busch, Adolph Coors and Frederick Miller. Although these men, craft brewers themselves, initially re-created the full-bodied beers of their homeland, many Americans had not developed a taste for the malt-heavy style. They needed a domestic ingredient that would make the beers more effervescent, bubbly and lighter. Rice and corn did that – it was a desired flavor, not inexpensive filler."

=== Bittering agents ===
Throughout history, a wide variety of flavouring agents have been added to beer to impart complexity and bitterness to the final product. Historically, these spice adjuncts were known as gruit. Most modern beer is flavoured with hops, the immature flowers of a specific species of hemp plant, to contribute bitterness, flavour and aroma to a beer. How much hop bitterness and aroma is appropriate varies between beer styles. There are many varieties of hops, some of which are associated with beers from specific regions. For example, Saaz hops are associated with Czech Pilsners; Hallertau and Tettnanger are two of the "noble" hop varieties one expects to find in German beers, and Kent Goldings are an English variety.

=== Water ===
Water is the main ingredient in beer, and, though water itself is flavourless, the chemical composition can have an influence on the finished taste; indeed, some brewers regard it as "the most important ingredient in beer". In particular, two styles of beer are especially noted for their water chemistry: pale ale, for which the process of Burtonisation is widespread; and Pilsner.

=== Other ingredients ===
Fruits and spices are key ingredients in some beer styles. While fruit beers and herb beers are often listed as style categories unto themselves, fruits and spices are sometimes used to contribute to the flavour and aroma profile of other styles. Vegetables have also been used in beers. Honey, molasses, candy sugar, or other fermentable sugars may be added to impart their distinct flavours to a beer. While not an ingredient per se, some brewers have experimented with ageing their beer in barrels previously used for bourbon or other distilled spirits, imparting the flavour of both the wood and the spirit to the beer.

Alcoholic beverages made from the fermentation of sugars derived from non-grain sources are generally not called "beer," despite being produced by the same yeast-based biochemical reaction. Fermented honey is called mead, fermented apple juice is called cider, fermented pear juice is called perry (sometimes, pear cider), fermented plum juice is called plum jerkum, and fermented grape juice is called wine. Chinese jiu and Japanese sake are made using much the same process as beer with one additional step in the fermentation as well as using rice instead of primarily barley malt.

== Beer styles ==
Most beer styles fall into types roughly according to the time and temperature of the primary fermentation and the variety of yeast used during fermentation. As the terminology of brewing arose before the advent of the science of microbiology, "yeast" in this context may refer not only to fungi but to some bacteria, for example Lactobacillus in Berliner Weisse.

Top-fermenting yeast typically ferments at higher temperatures 15–23 °C (59–73 °F), producing significant amounts of esters and other secondary flavours and aromas, often resembling those of apple, pear, pineapple, grass, hay, banana, plum or prune.

Top-fermented beers include Brown Ale, Mild Ale, Old Ale, Pale Ale, Stout and Wheat beer.

Pale lagers are the most commonly consumed type of beer in the world. Lagers are of Central European origin, taking their name from the German lagern ("to store"), and normally use a bottom-fermenting yeast which begin fermenting at 7–12 °C (45–54 °F) (the "fermentation phase"), and then stored at 0–4 °C (32–39 °F) (the "lagering phase"). During the secondary stage, the lager clears and mellows. The cooler conditions also inhibit the natural production of esters and other byproducts, resulting in a "crisper" tasting beer.

Modern methods of producing lager were pioneered by Gabriel Sedlmayr the Younger, who perfected dark brown lagers at the Spaten Brewery in Bavaria, and Anton Dreher, who began brewing a lager in Vienna, Austria, in 1840–1841. With modern improved fermentation control, most lager breweries use only short periods of cold storage, typically 1–3 weeks.

Most of today's lager is based on the original Pilsner style, pioneered in 1842 in the city of Plzeň (German: Pilsen), in an area of the Austrian Empire now located in the Czech Republic. The modern pale lager that developed from Pilsner is light in colour and high in forced carbonation, with an alcohol content of 3–6% by volume. The Pilsner Urquell or Heineken brands of beer are typical examples of pale lager, with the Pilsner Urquell brand having a hop presence more associated with the pilsner style. Principal styles of lager include pale lager, Bock, Dunkel, Helles, Oktoberfestbier / Märzen, Pilsner, Schwarzbier and Vienna lager.

Beers of spontaneous fermentation use wild yeasts rather than cultivated ones. By the Middle Ages, brewers had learned to crop the yeast from one brew and use it in the next. Only in a few isolated regions were wild yeasts still used. The best-known region where spontaneous fermentation is still used is the Senne Valley in Belgium where lambic is produced.

Hybrid or mixed style beers use modern techniques and materials instead of, or in addition to, traditional aspects of brewing. Although there is some variation among sources, mixed beers generally fall into the following categories:

- Altbier and Kölsch, both of which are top fermented before being cold conditioned, i.e. lagered.
- Steam beers were invented by German immigrants living in California and are made with a type of bottom-fermenting yeast that can ferment at warmer temperatures. The name "steam beer" is a trademark of the Anchor Brewing Company, though other brewers brew this beer under the designation "California common".
- Fruit and vegetable beers are mixed with some kind of fermentable fruit or vegetable adjunct during the fermentation process, providing obvious yet harmonious qualities.
- Herb and spiced beers include herbs or spices derived from roots, seeds, fruits, vegetables or flowers instead of, or in addition to hops.
- Wood-aged beers are any traditional or experimental beer that has been aged in a wooden barrel or have been left in contact with wood chips or cubes. Often, the barrel or wood will be treated first with some variety of spirit or other alcoholic beverage; bourbon, scotch and sherry are common.
- Smoked beers use malt that has been treated by exposing it to smoke from burning or smouldering wood so that a smoky aroma and flavour is present. The best known examples of this style are the Rauchbiers of Bamberg, Germany. Brewers outside Germany have also used smoked malt in porters, Scotch ale and other styles.
- Champagne-style beers are finished "à la méthode originale", mainly in Belgium, and include Grottenbier, Deus and Malheur Bière Brut.

== Other fermented drinks based on cereals ==
- Boza
- Cauim
- Chhaang
- Chicha
- Gruit
- Kvass
- Oshikundu
- Pulque
- Sahti
- Sato (rice wine), also called lao hai (jug alcohol) when home-brewed in jugs
- Sulima, made by the Mosuo people in the Lijiang region of Yunnan, China

== See also ==
- Beer sommelier

== Bibliography ==
- Arnold, John P. (1911). Origin and History of Beer and Brewing. Chicago, Illinois: Alumni Association of the Wahl-Henius Institute of Fermentology. OCLC 2215173.
- Almqvist, Bo (1965). The Viking Ale and the Rhine Gold.
- Jackson, Michael (1977). The World Guide to Beer. Englewood Cliffs, New Jersey: Prentice-Hall. ISBN 978-0-13-968057-1.
- Eckhardt, Fred (1989). The Essentials of Beer Style. Portland, Oregon: Fred Eckhardt Communications. ISBN 978-0-9606302-7-1.
- Rhodes, Christine (1995). The Encyclopedia of Beer. New York: Henry Holt. ISBN 978-0-8050-3799-9.
- Cornell, Martyn (2004). Beer: the Story of the Pint. London: Headline. ISBN 978-0-7553-1165-1.
