= Brewers Association =

Trade group of American brewers

- Formation: 2005; 21 years ago
- Merger of: Association of Brewers, Brewers' Association of America
- Type: Trade association
- Tax ID no.: 84-0802918
- Legal status: 501(c)(6) organization
- Headquarters: Boulder, Colorado
- Members: 5,400 brewers (2020)
- President and CEO: Bart Watson
- Website: brewersassociation.org

The Brewers Association is an American trade group of over 5,400 brewers, breweries in planning, suppliers, distributors, craft beer retailers, and individuals particularly concerned with the promotion of craft beer and homebrewing.

Two of the largest programs supported by the Brewers Association are the American Homebrewers Association and the annual Great American Beer Festival. On January 27, 2025, the American Homebrewers Association announced it is incorporating to become an independent organization from the Brewers Association. As of this edit, this process is ongoing.

The current president and CEO is Bart Watson. The American Homebrewers Association was founded by past Brewers Association president Charlie Papazian.

== American Homebrewers Association (AHA) ==
Logo of the American Homebrewers Association featured in 2011

The American Homebrewers Association, is the world's largest association devoted to homebrewing and supports homebrewers of beer, cider, mead and home fermented beverages. It was founded in 1978 by Charlie Papazian and Charlie Matzen in Boulder, Colorado and helped found the Brewers Association. It runs the world's largest homebrew competition and organizes several homebrew events in the United States and Canada. Julia Herz is the current executive director. The American Homebrewers Association publishes the magazine Zymurgy six times per year to its 20,000 members.

It was announced in January, 2025 that the AHA was being spun off from the Brewers Association as a completely independent non-profit

The American Homebrewers Association hosts the following events annually:

- National Homebrew Competition
- Homebrew Con (previously known as the National Homebrewers Conference) which includes the finals of the National Homebrew Competition
- Big Brew, held the first Saturday in May
- Home Fermentation Day, held the first Saturday in August
- Learn to Homebrew Day, held the first Saturday in November

=== Ninkasi Award ===
The Ninkasi Award is the prize given by American Homebrewers Association for the brewer who gains the most points in the final round of the National Homebrew Competition, judged at the National Homebrewers Conference. Points are gained from the brewer's winning entries in the 23 categories of beer and several categories of mead and cider. At least 2 points (1 bronze placement) must come from a beer entry.

The Ninkasi Award is named in honor of Ninkasi, the Sumerian goddess of beer.

==== Past winners ====
The winners since the introduction of the Ninkasi Award in 1992:

- 1992 – Steve & Christina Daniel
- 1993 – Walter Dobrowsky
- 1994 – Michael Byers
- 1995 – Rhett Rebold
- 1996 – Tom Bergman & Chas Peterson
- 1997 – George Fix
- 1998 – Art Beall
- 1999 – Tom Plunkard
- 2000 – Joe Formanek
- 2001 – Brian Cole
- 2002 – Curt Hausam
- 2003 – Curt Hausam (2nd win)
- 2004 – Jamil Zainasheff
- 2005 – Paul Long
- 2006 – Joe Formanek (2nd win)
- 2007 – Jamil Zainasheff (2nd win)
- 2008 – Gordon Strong
- 2009 – Gordon Strong (2nd win)
- 2010 – Gordon Strong (3rd win)
- 2011 – Paul Sangster
- 2012 – Mark Schoppe
- 2013 – David Barber
- 2014 – Jeremy Voeltz
- 2015 – Mark Schoppe (2nd win)
- 2016 – Derrick Flippin
- 2017 – Jeff Poirot and Nicholas McCoy
- 2018 – Greg Young
- 2019 – Mark Peterson
- 2020 - No Competition (COVID)
- 2021 - Jason Lowery
- 2022 - Timothy Lambert
- 2023 - Richard Shoff
- 2024 - Jarrett Long and John Bates

== Brewers publications ==
Brewers Publications was started in 1986 and is under the umbrella of the Brewers Association organization. The first book Brewers Publications published was Brewing Lager Beer: The Most Comprehensive Book for Home- and Microbreweries by Greg Noonan.
