= Beer Institute =

American trade association

- Founded: 1986; 40 years ago
- Tax ID no.: 52-1439662
- Legal status: 501(c)(6)
- Headquarters: Washington, D.C., U.S.
- President, Chief Executive Officer: Brian Crawford
- Board of Directors: Gavin Hattersley (MillerCoors), Chairman; João Castro Neves (Anheuser-Busch), Vice Chairman and Senior Director; Ronald den Elzen (Heineken USA), Bill Hackett (Constellation Brands); Brett Joyce (Rogue Ales
- Revenue: $6,614,929 (2015)
- Expenses: $6,449,496 (2015)
- Employees: 17 (2015)
- Website: www.beerinstitute.org
- Formerly called: United States Brewers' Association

Beer Institute is a national trade association, headquartered in Washington, D.C. representing companies which produce and import beer sold in the United States.

Beer Institute was organized in 1986 from the United States Brewers' Association to represent the industry before Congress, state legislatures and public forums across the country.

== Lobbying ==
The organization lobbied the Department of Health and Human Services, led by Robert F. Kennedy Jr., to eliminate drinking limit recommendations and public warnings linking the consumption of alcohol to cancer and other health risks in January 2026.
