= List of Massachusetts companies =

This is a list of companies located in Massachusetts.

== Companies based in Massachusetts ==
=== 0–9 ===
- 2 Minute Medicine

=== A ===
- Actifio
- Akamai Technologies
- American Outdoor Brands Corporation
- Analog Devices
- Analysis Group
- Arbella Insurance Group
- athenahealth
- Au Bon Pain
- Avedis Zildjian Company

=== B ===
- Bad Martha Brewing Company
- Bain Capital
- Baskin-Robbins
- BBN Technologies
- Berkshire Bank
- Bertucci's
- Big Y
- Biogen
- BJ's Wholesale Club
- Blue Hills Brewery
- Bose Corporation
- Boston Beer Company
- Boston Scientific
- Brine

=== C ===
- Cabot Corporation
- Cape Air
- Circle
- Cisco Brewers
- Commerce Bank & Trust Company
- Converse
- CRA International
- Crane Currency
- Cutter Consortium

=== D ===
- Daily Table
- Datawatch Corporation
- Dell EMC
- DePuy Synthes
- Destination XL Group
- Dunkin' Brands

=== E ===
- Eaton Vance
- European Watch Company
- Equal Exchange

=== F ===
- Fidelity Investments
- Forrester Research
- Friendly's
- The Fullbridge Program
- Fuze

=== G ===
- GE Measurement & Control
- Genzyme
- Gillette
- Grillo's Pickles
- Global Insight
- Global Partners

=== H ===
- Hanover Insurance
- Harpoon Brewery
- Highland Capital Partners
- Hologic
- Homestead Technologies
- Honey Dew Donuts
- Houghton Mifflin Harcourt
- Houghton Mifflin Harcourt Learning Technology
- HYCU

=== I ===
- Important Records
- iRobot
- Iron Mountain

=== J ===
- John Hancock Financial
- Johnny Cupcakes
- Jordan's Furniture

=== K ===
- Kadant
- KB Toys
- Kronos Incorporated

=== L ===
- L. S. Starrett Company
- Lakeside Software
- Liberty Mutual
- Lionbridge
- Lola.com
- LPL Financial

=== M ===
- Market Basket
- Massachusetts Bay Trading Company
- Massachusetts Mutual Life Insurance Company
- MathWorks
- Mercury Brewing Company
- Merriam-Webster
- Millennium Pharmaceuticals
- Moderna

=== N ===
- Nantucket Airlines
- National Amusements
- Netmorf
- New Balance
- Newburyport Brewing Company
- No Sweat Apparel

=== O ===
- Ocean Spray
- OptiRTC

=== P ===
- Papa Gino's
- Peter Pan Bus Lines
- Pinsly Railroad Company
- Polar Beverages
- Progress Software

=== R ===
- Raytheon
- Reebok
- Rocket Software
- Rockport

=== S ===
- Salary.com
- Saucony
- Savage Arms
- SharkNinja
- Shaw's and Star Market
- Sigma-Aldrich
- Spindrift Beverage Co.
- Staples Inc.
- State Street Corporation
- Steinway Musical Instruments
- Stop and Shop
- Sterilite
- Stride Rite Corporation

=== T ===
- Talbots
- Tea Forté
- Thermo Fisher Scientific
- TJX Companies, owners of HomeGoods, Marshalls and TJ Maxx
- Traveling Vineyard
- Tripadvisor

=== U ===
- Unitrends
- Uno Pizzeria & Grill

=== V ===
- Vertex Pharmaceuticals
- Vertica
- Vineyard Vines

=== W ===
- Wachusett Brewing Company
- Welch's

=== Y ===
- Yankee Candle
- Yottaa

=== Z ===
- Zoom Telephonics

== Companies formerly based in Massachusetts ==
=== 0-9 ===
- 3Com

=== B ===
- BroadVoice

=== C ===
- Cybex International
- CVS Pharmacy

=== F ===
- Filene's Basement

=== G ===
- GreenFuel Technologies Corporation
- Ground Round

=== I ===
- I-Logix

=== K ===
- Kurzweil Educational Systems

=== L ===
- Lord & Burnham
- Lotus Development

=== N ===
- Necco
- Novell
- NSTAR

=== P ===
- Perini Building Company
- PerkStreet
- Polaroid Corporation

=== T ===
- Thompson/Center Arms

== See also ==
- List of companies of the United States by state
