= List of breweries in Massachusetts =

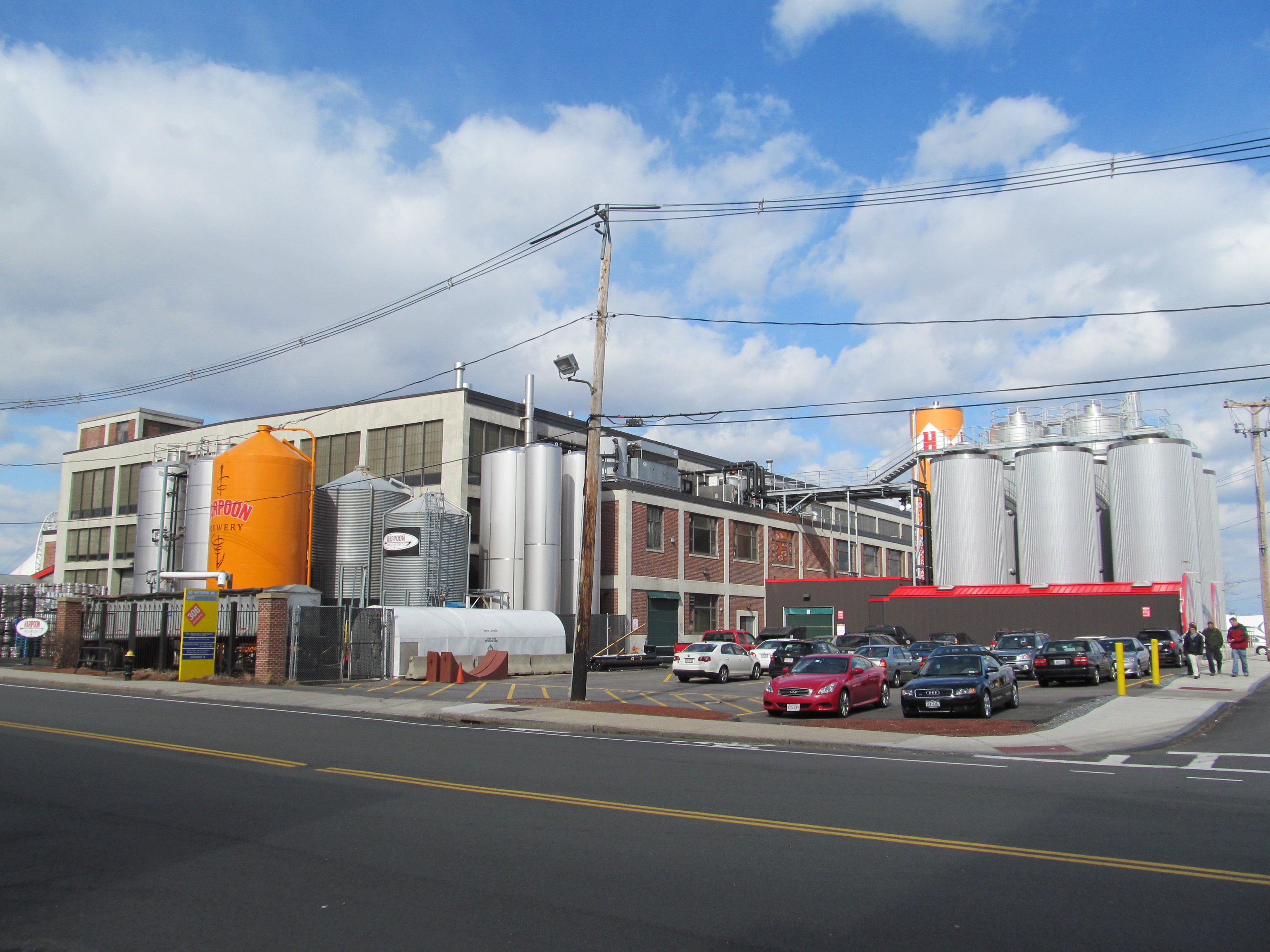
Harpoon Brewery, in Boston, Massachusetts

This is an historical overview and list of Massachusetts breweries and beer brands that are currently operating. Breweries in Massachusetts produce a wide range of beers in different styles that are marketed locally, regionally, and nationally. In 2012 Massachusetts' 72 brewing establishments (including breweries, brewpubs, importers, and company-owned packagers and wholesalers) employed 1,100 people directly, and more than 25,000 others in related jobs such as wholesaling and retailing. Altogether, 53 people in Massachusetts had active brewer permits in 2012.

As of 2018, there are more than 150 registered craft brewers in Massachusetts.

Including people directly employed in brewing, as well as those who supply Massachusetts' breweries with everything from ingredients to machinery, the total business and personal tax revenue generated by Massachusetts' breweries and related industries was more than $990 million. Consumer purchases of Massachusetts' brewery products generated more than $152 million extra in tax revenue. In 2012, according to the Brewers Association, Massachusetts ranked 28th in the number of craft breweries per capita with 47.

Brewing companies vary widely in the volume and variety of beer produced, from small nanobreweries and microbreweries to massive multinational conglomerate macrobreweries. For context, at the end of 2013 there were 2,822 breweries in the United States, including 2,768 craft breweries subdivided into 1,237 brewpubs, 1,412 microbreweries and 119 regional craft breweries. In that same year, according to the Beer Institute, the brewing industry employed around 43,000 Americans in brewing and distribution and had a combined economic impact of more than $246 billion.

== History ==
In 1637, Robert Sedgewick began operation of the first brewery in the Massachusetts Bay Colony, just 17 years after the Mayflower landed in 1620. None are known to have been long-lasting in the 17th and 18th century in Boston, but in 1828, Gamaliel Bradford, Nathan Rice, Benjamin Thaxter, and Elijah Loring started the Boston Beer Company, chartered and incorporated by an act of the Massachusetts Legislature. At the height of Boston's prominence as a brewing hub, the city boasted 27 breweries. The Boston Beer Company, on Second Street in South Boston, was to last until 1957. A second notable brewery in Boston was to survive Prohibition. This was the Haffenreffer Brewery in Jamaica Plain, originally established as the Boylston Lager Beer Company in the 1870s, and operating until 1965. For twenty years after the closing of Haffenreffer, Boston had no producing breweries. It was on Patriot's Day in April 1985, that Jim Koch and his team unveiled Samuel Adams (beer), among the first wave of breweries to characterize the modern American craft beer renaissance, and revived the Boston Beer Company name. Around the same time, in 1986, Rich Doyle, Dan Kenary, and George Ligeti founded Mass Bay Brewing Company, which would become Harpoon Brewery.

== Dukes County ==
- Bad Martha Brewing Company, Edgartown – production brewery

== Essex County ==
- Mercury Brewing Company, Ipswich – production brewery and contract brewing facility
- Newburyport Brewing Company, Newburyport – production brewery

== Franklin County ==
- Berkshire Brewing Company, South Deerfield
- Element Brewing and Distilling, Millers Falls
- The People's Pint, Greenfield

== Middlesex County ==
- Aeronaut Brewing Company, Somerville
- Arlington Brewing Company, Arlington

== Nantucket County ==
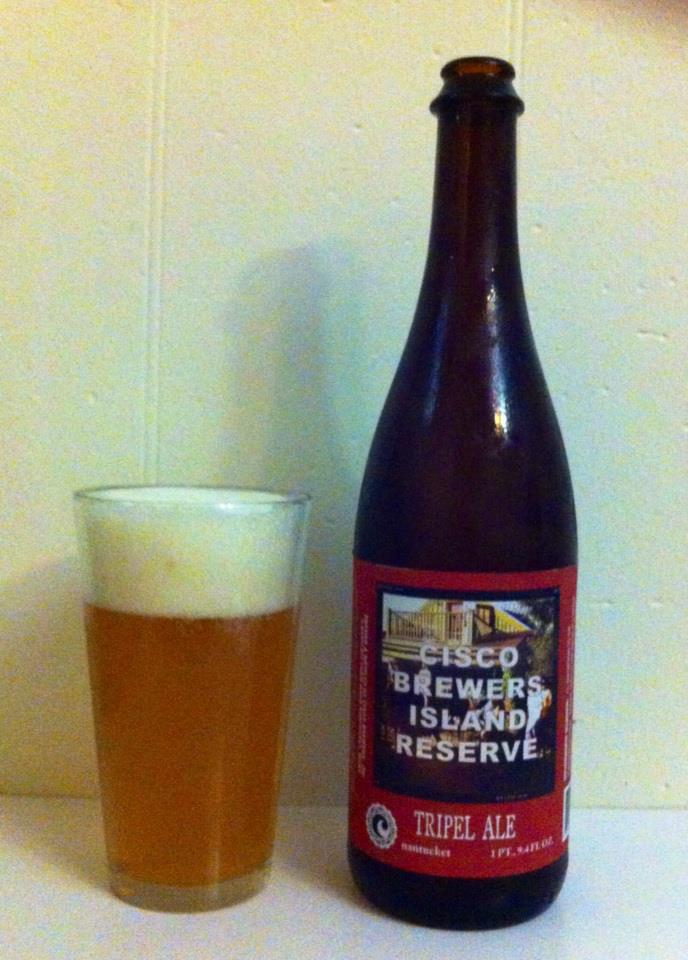
Cisco Brewers' Tripel

- Cisco Brewers, Nantucket – production brewery

== Norfolk County ==
- Blue Hills Brewery, Canton – production brewery

== Suffolk County ==
- Boston Beer Company, Boston – production brewery
- Harpoon Brewery, Boston – production brewery

== Worcester County ==
- Wachusett Brewing Company, Westminster – production brewery
- Tree House Brewing Company, Charlton—production brewery

== Former breweries ==
- Bunker Hill Breweries, Charlestown
- H. & J. Pfaff Brewing Company, Boston
- Haffenreffer Brewery, Jamaica Plain
- Harvard Brewing Company, Lowell
- Holihan Brothers, Lawrence
- The Vienna Brewery, Boston

== See also ==
- Beer in the United States
- List of breweries in the United States
- List of microbreweries
