= Greenfly =

Greenfly may refer to:

- Green peach aphid, a variety of aphid which is commonly known as greenfly in Britain and the Commonwealth
- Common green bottle fly, an insect
- Greenfly (producer), the artist name of Lawrence Green, an English drum and bass music producer
- Self-replicating spacecraft, a fictional self-replicating space craft in the science fiction novels by Alastair Reynolds
- Tabanus nigrovittatus, a biting horsefly more commonly known as the greenhead horsefly, greenhead fly, or greenhead
