= Greenhead =

Greenhead may refer to:

== Placenames ==
- Greenhead (Wishaw), Scotland
- Greenhead, Northumberland, England
- Greenhead, Scottish Borders, Scotland
- Greenhead, Staffordshire, England
- Greenhead College, a sixth form college in Huddersfield, England

== Other ==
- Greenhead fly, a fly in the family Tabanidae family often considered a pest.
- Greenhead IPA, an India Pale Ale produced by the Newburyport Brewing Company. It is named after the Greenhead fly.
- A male mallard, a species of duck

== As Green Head ==
- Green Head, Cumbria, England
- Green Head, Western Australia
