= Opti =

Opti may refer to

- OPTi Inc., a manufacturer of computer components
- Daihatsu Opti, a car
- OPTI Canada, an oil company
- Optimist (dinghy), a type of boat
- OptiRTC, a software company
