= Nantucket Lightship Basket Museum =

The Nantucket Lightship Basket Museum
- Location: Nantucket
- Coordinates: 41.2791°N 70.0950°W
- Type: Museum
- Website: http://www.nantucketlightshipbasketmuseum.org/

The Nantucket Lightship Basket Museum is a small seasonal museum and gift shop located in Nantucket, Massachusetts, dedicated to the history and preservation of Nantucket Lightship Baskets.

== History ==
The museum is located at 49 Union Street in Nantucket, Massachusetts. It was founded shortly after the Nantucket Historical Association by David H. Wood. It is concerned with preserving and exploring artifacts from the whaling era and before, even as far back as the Native American settlements on Nantucket before the 15th century.

== Exhibits ==
The museum contains many exhibits on lightship basket construction, history, and preservation. The facility also includes a museum gift shop.
