= Charles Street (Boston) =

Street in Boston, Massachusetts

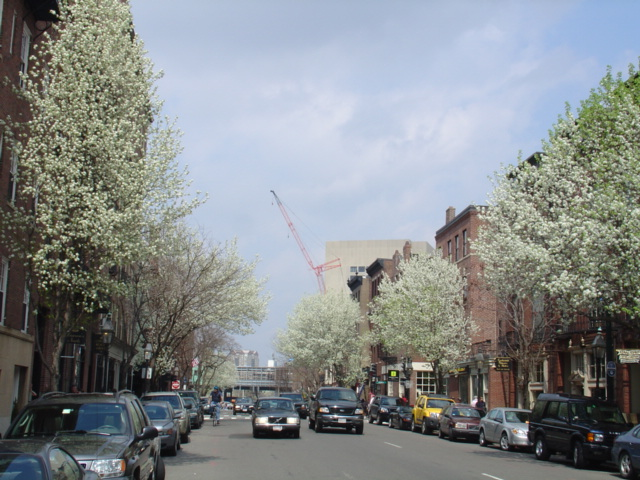
- Looking north toward Hamilton Coolidge Square
- Location: Boston
- South end: Boylston Street in Boston
- North end: Cambridge Avenue in Boston

Charles Street is a north-south street in the city center of Boston, Massachusetts. It begins in the north at Leverett Circle, where it connects with Nashua Street and Monsignor O'Brien Highway. Science Park station on the MBTA Green Line is located there. Charles Street runs south and gives its name to the Charles/MGH station on the MBTA Red Line, connecting via the Charles Circle rotary to Cambridge Street and the Longfellow Bridge which leads to Cambridge. This segment is a one-way street, with traffic heading northwards.

From Charles Circle, the street heads further south as a one-way southbound thoroughfare, and forms the primary commercial spine of the affluent neighborhood of Beacon Hill. As it crosses Beacon Street, the direction of one-way traffic reverts to northbound, and the street widens to form the boundary between Boston Common and the Boston Public Garden.

Beyond Boylston Street, which forms the southern boundary of the parks, the street continues as Charles Street South (formerly Carver Street), terminating at Tremont Street just south of the Theatre District.

The street is the start and finish point for the annual B.A.A. 10K race, first organised by the Boston Athletic Association in 2011.

== Notable residents ==
- John Albion Andrew lived on Charles St., 1855-1867
- Annie Adams Fields, James T. Fields, Sarah Orne Jewett (site of 148 Charles St.)
- Lucretia Peabody Hale (127 Charles St.)
- Davide Rossi (143 Charles St.)
- Edgar Allan Poe was born at 62 Carver Street, since renamed to Charles Street South

== In film ==
Part of Martin Scorsese's 2006 film The Departed was filmed along Charles Street in Beacon Hill.

== Image gallery ==
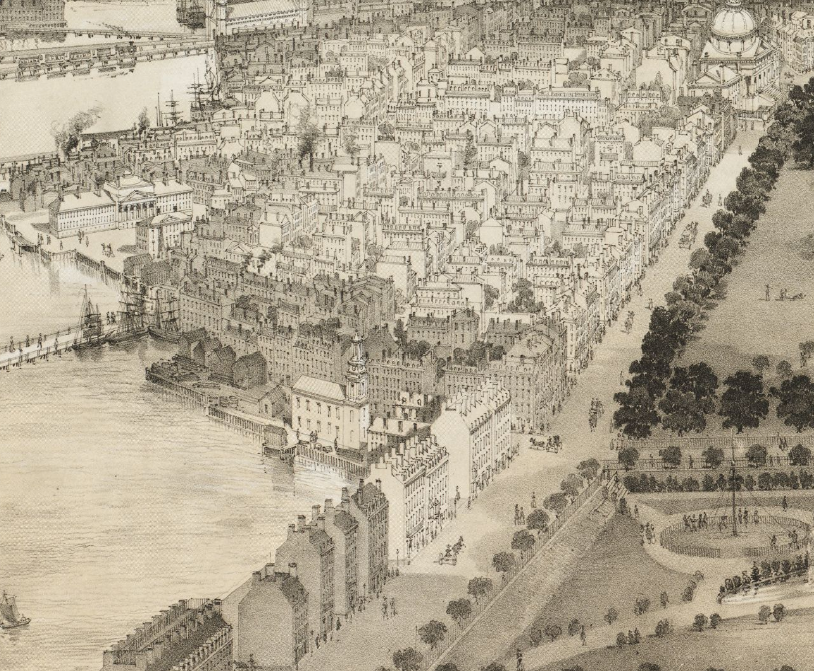
Overview of Beacon Hill, with Charles St. at water's edge, 1850

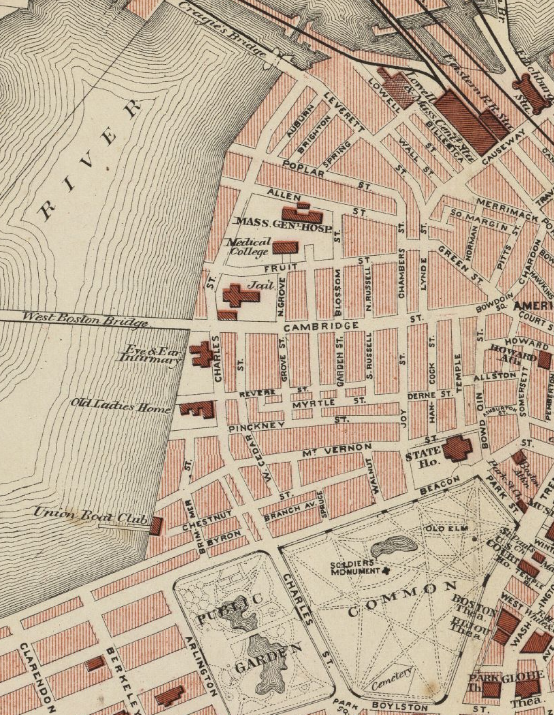
Detail of 1883 map of Boston, showing extent of Charles St.

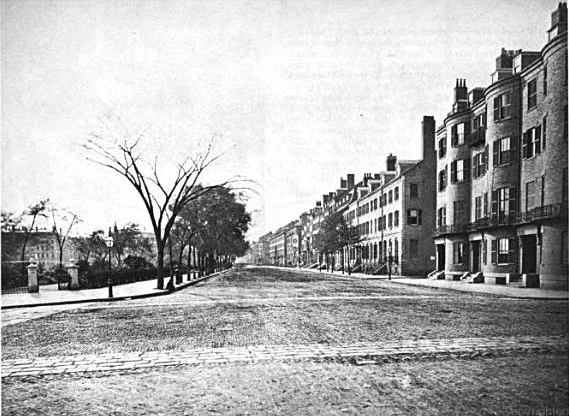
Corner of Beacon St. and Charles St., c. 1870

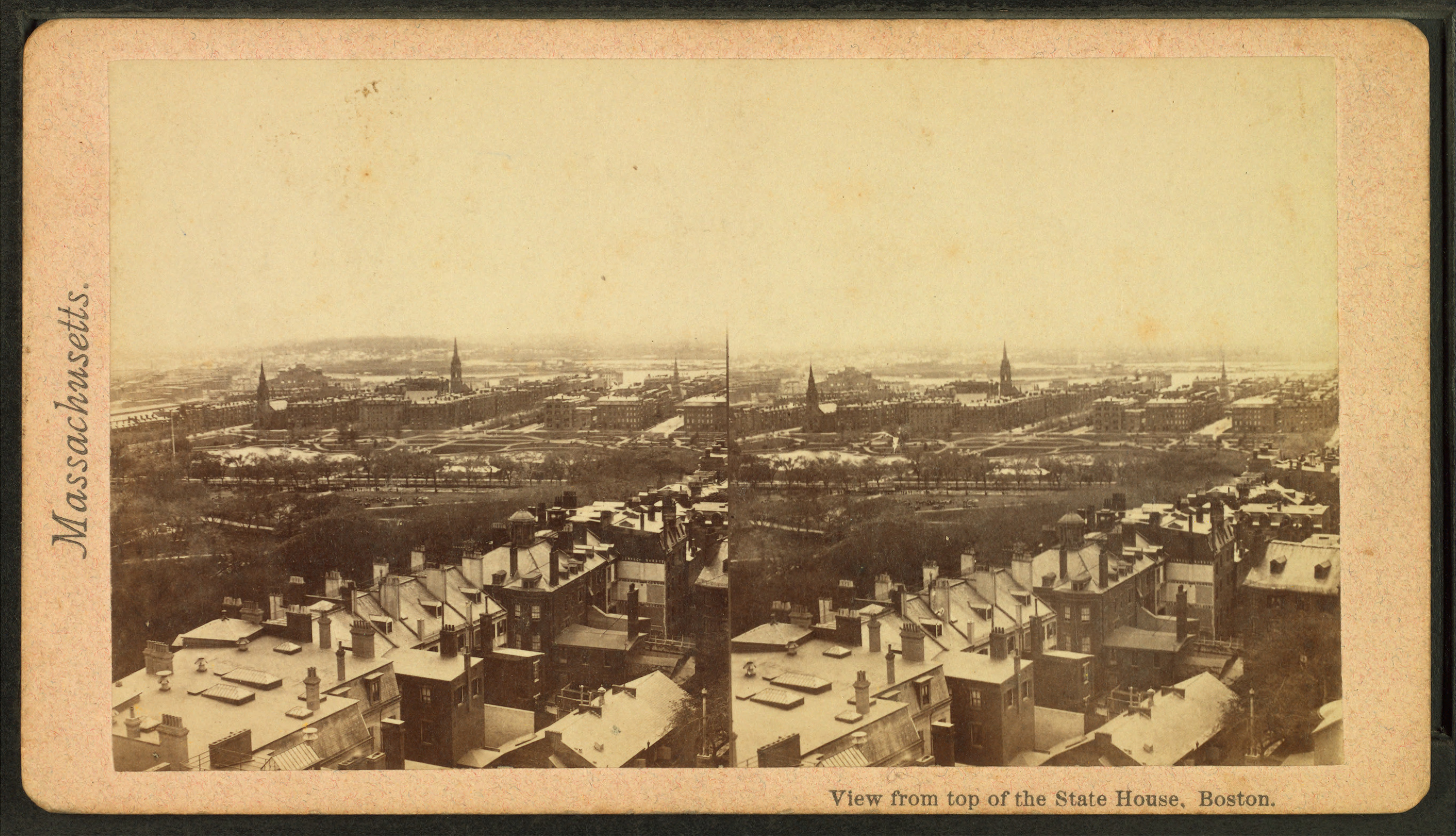
View of Charles St., Public Garden and Common, from State House, 19th century

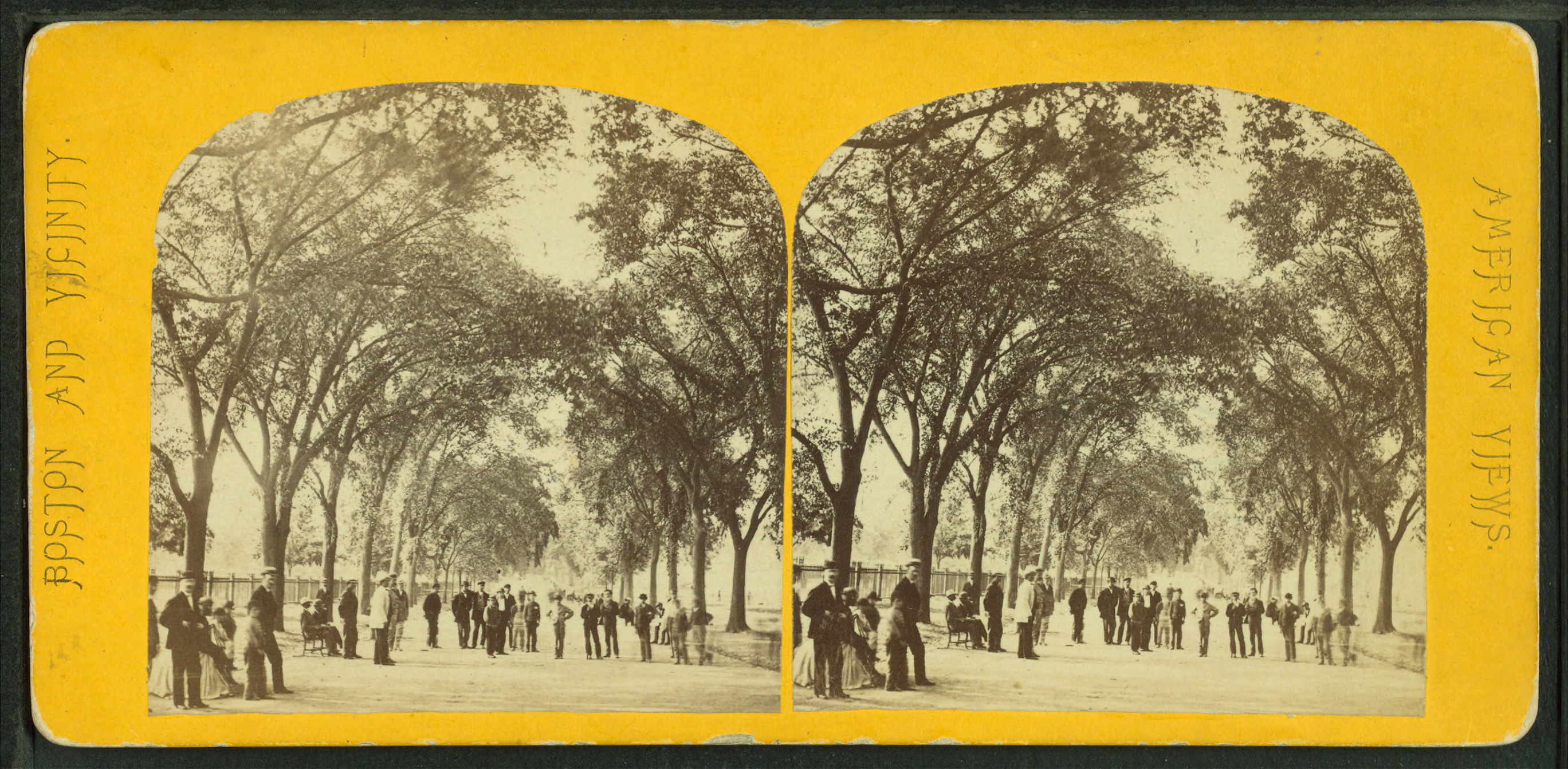
Charles Street Mall on the Common, 19th century

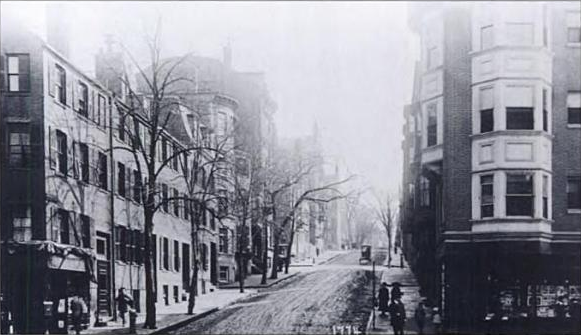
Corner of Charles St. and Mt. Vernon St., c. 1905

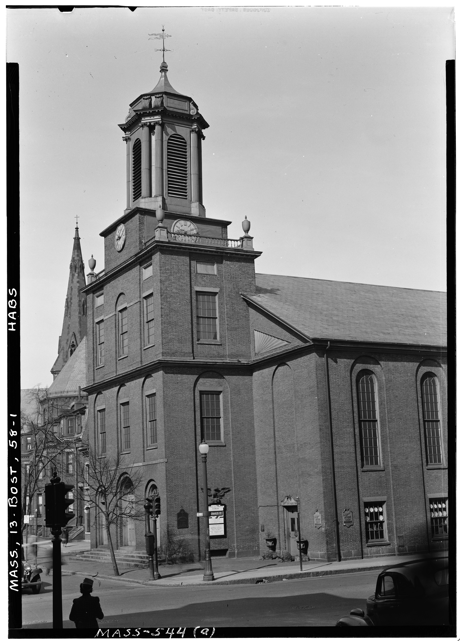
Charles Street Meeting House, 1941

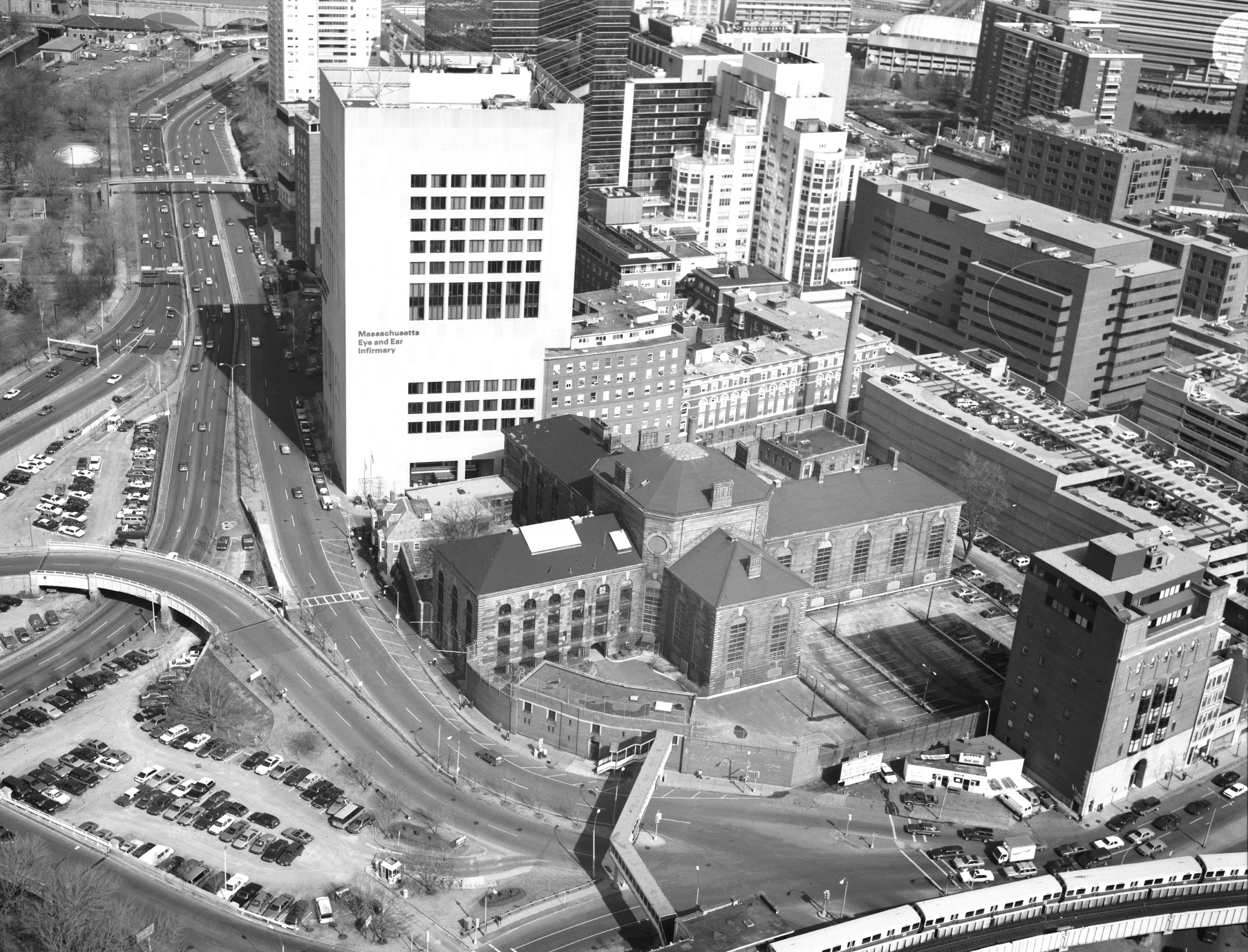
Charles Street Jail

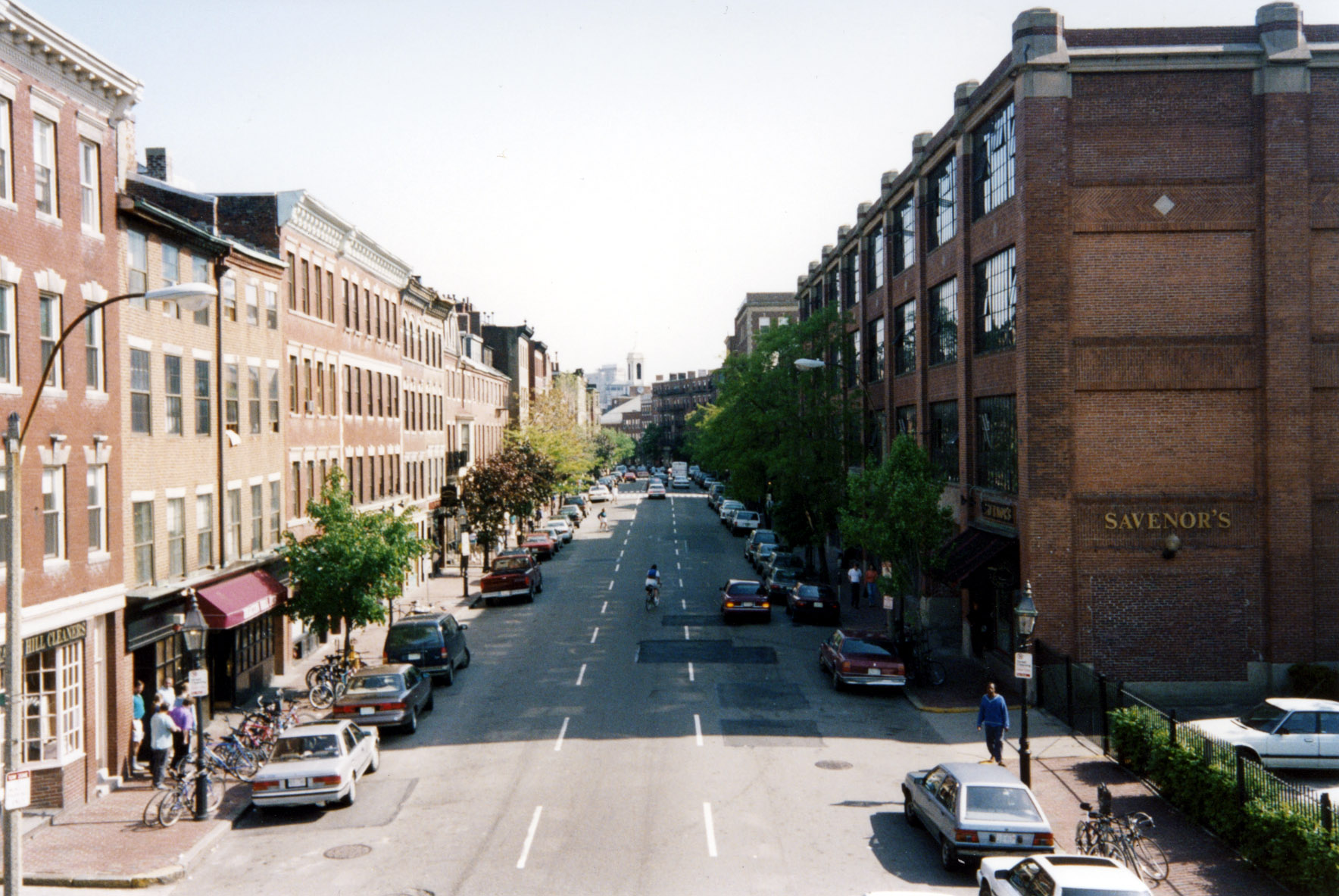
View of Charles St. from Cambridge St., 1993

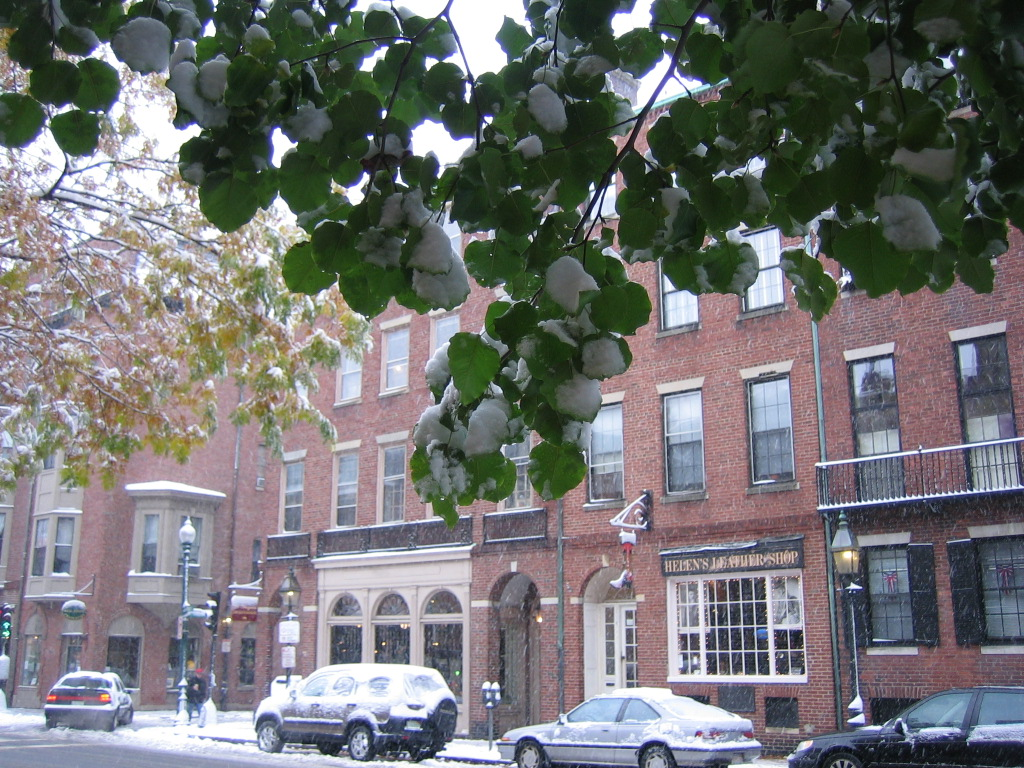
Charles St., 2004

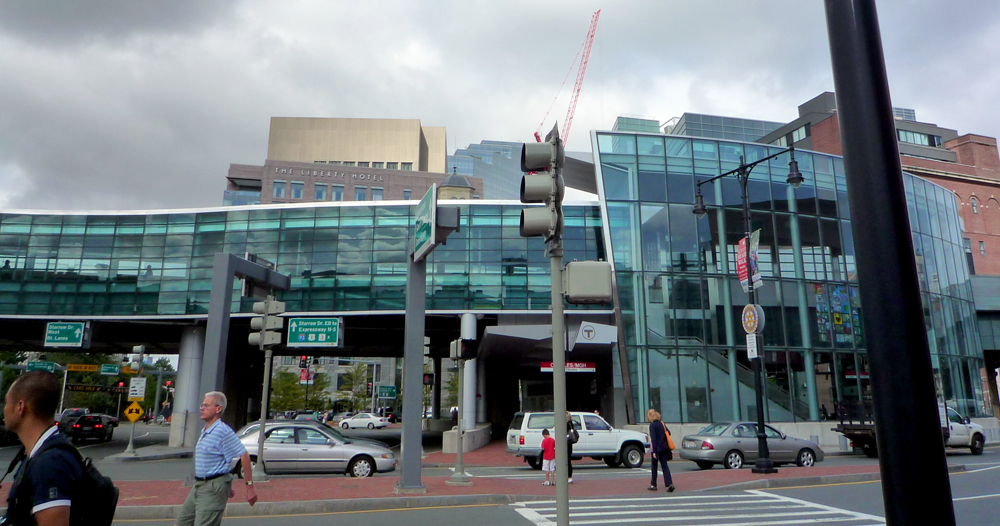
Charles St. and Cambridge St., 2009

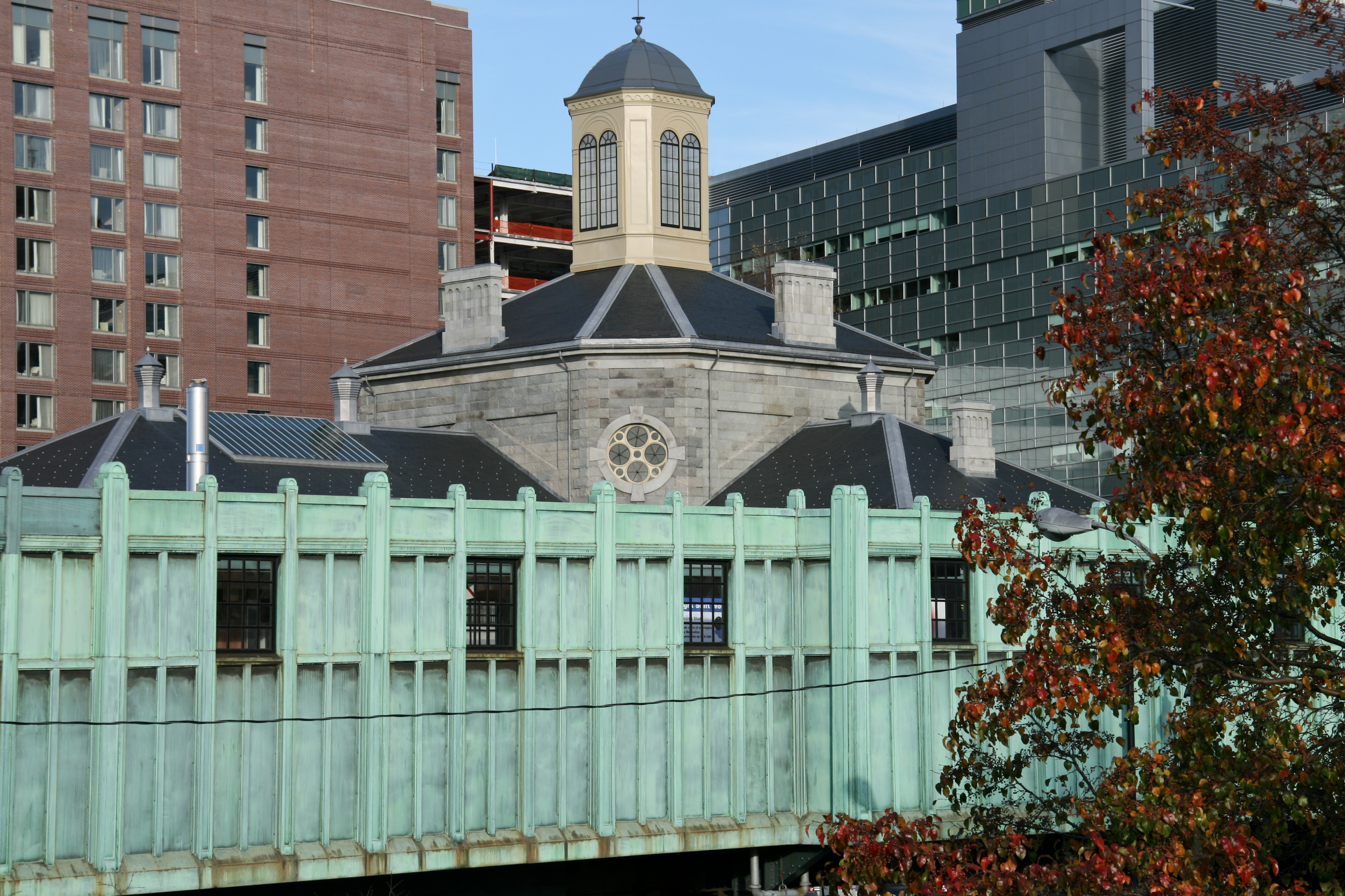
Charles St. and Cambridge St., 2009

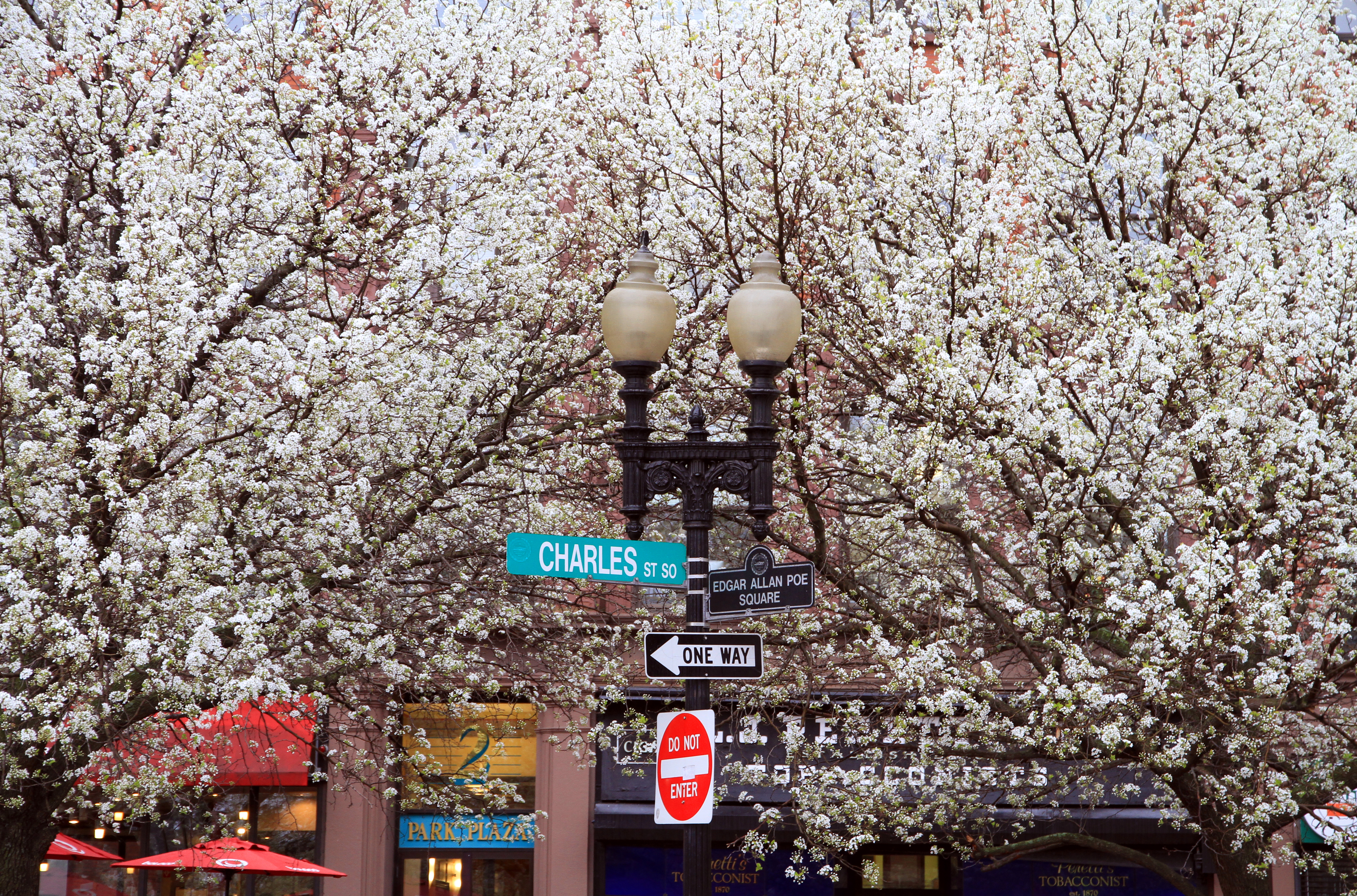
Charles St. at Edgar Allan Poe Square

== See also ==
- Sevens Ale House
