= Sevens Ale House =

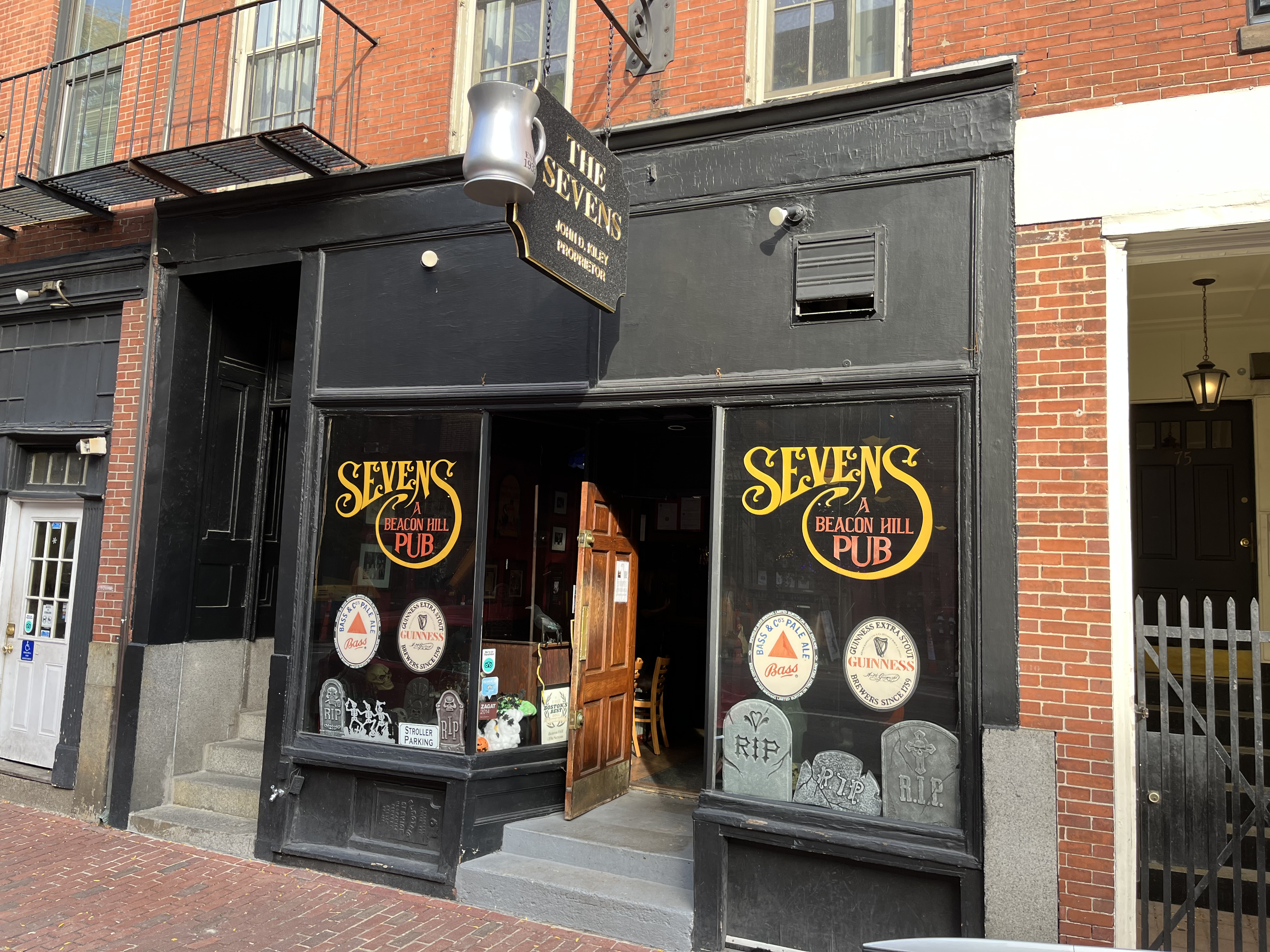
- The pub’s frontage in 2022
- Interactive map of Sevens Ale House

Restaurant information
- Established: 1933 (93 years ago)
- Owners: Julianne and Jack Kiley
- Location: 77 Charles Street, Beacon Hill, Boston, Suffolk County, Massachusetts, 02114, United States
- Coordinates: 42.358337°N 71.070449°W
- Reservations: No

Sevens Ale House (known colloquially as The Sevens) is a public house in the heart of the Beacon Hill neighborhood of Boston, Massachusetts. Located at 77 Charles Street, it has been in operation since 1933.

The pub has a distinctive silver beer stein on its overhead sign on the building's front. The establishment is also notable for being one of the few remaining with a dart board.

Harpoon Brewery brews a "Sevens Ale" specifically for the pub. Sevens Ale House was one of the brewery's first two accounts upon its foundation in 1986.

On June 2, 2017, Harrison Ford visited the pub, which is part of the Beacon Hill Business Association.

Due to the COVID-19 pandemic, the business was closed for the 15-month period between March 2020 and June 2021.
