= Sasha Purpura =

American non-profit executive and agriculturist

Alexandra 'Sasha' Purpura (née Willoughby) is an American non-profit executive and sustainable agriculturist. She is the former CEO of Food For Free and Daily Table, and currently serves as co-chair of the Make Hunger History coalition’s advisory council. A former software engineer, Purpura co-founded Plato's Harvest Organic Farm in 2005 and has served on numerous civic boards, including the Cambridge Chamber of Commerce and the Cambridge Nonprofit Coalition.

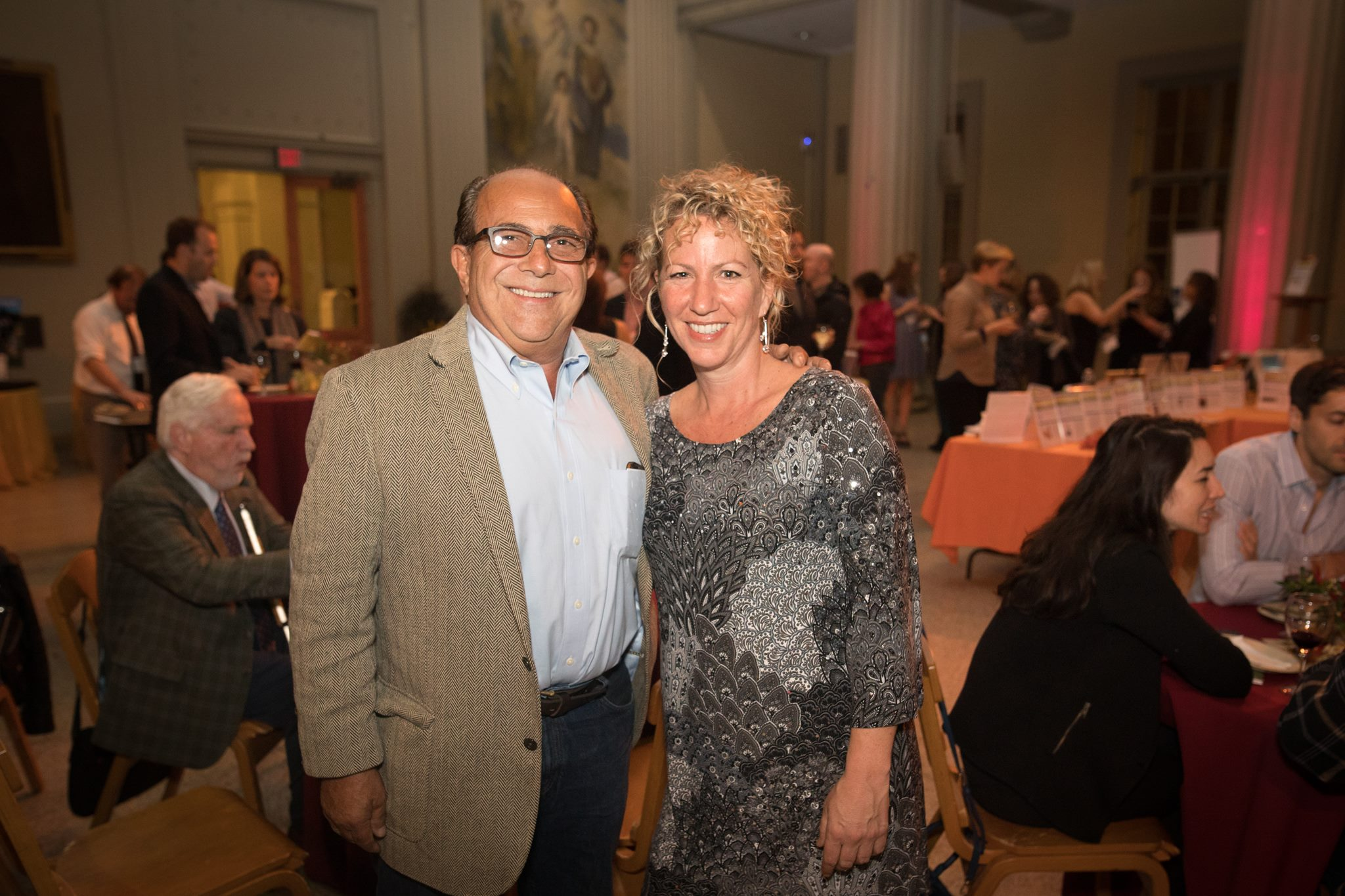
Sasha with Ray Magliozzi of Car Talk at Food For Free annual fundraising gala October 2016

== Career ==
Purpura graduated in computer science in 1994. She was a software engineer, product manager, and manager with Lotus, Nokia, and Iron Mountain. In 2005, she co-founded Plato’s Harvest Organic Farm with her husband, David Purpura. Inspired by the experience, she changed career in 2009, first acquiring an MBA in Organizational Sustainability, then joining Food For Free as executive director in July 2012. As CEO, she transformed it from serving just Cambridge to serving the region. Under her leadership, it grew its operating revenues from $400,000 in 2012 to $4.1 million at the time of her departure in 2022.

She was CEO of the non-profit grocery chain Daily Table until it closed in 2025.

Purpura then returned to sustainable agriculture at Plato's Harvest. However, she remained engaged in Massachusetts food policy as co-chair of Make Hunger History’s advisory council.

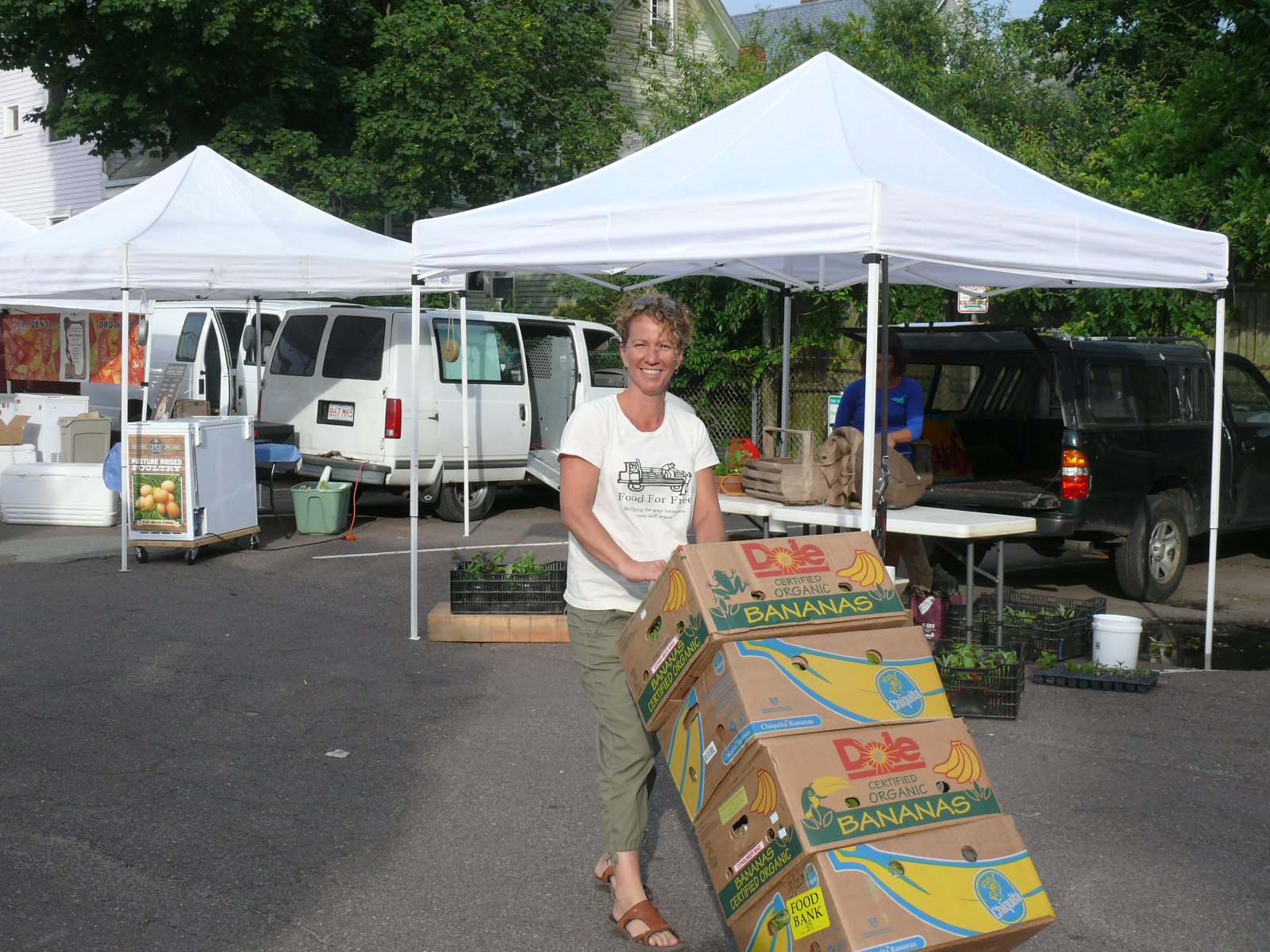
Sasha Purpura rescuing leftover food at the Cambridge Central Square Farmers Market
