= Massachusetts Bay Trading Company =

- Company type: Private
- Founded: 2002
- Headquarters: Boxborough, Massachusetts
- Key people: Owner-Amanda Light Founders- Bob and Beth Nilsson
- Products: Retail
- Website: www.massbaytrading.com

Massachusetts Bay Trading Co, Inc., is an online retailer headquartered in Boxborough, Massachusetts, selling New England products for event, corporate and personal gifting. It is an American electronic commerce company selling handmade gifts and general products that are made in the New England states. The company was established in 2002 by Bob and Beth Nilsson and is now owned by Amanda Light as of January 2025. The Massachusetts Bay Trading Company has been featured in multiple publications and television segments including the Boston Globe on April 6, 2007, Oprah Winfrey's O at Home magazine Winter 2006, Gourmet Magazine Winter 2006 gift guide, InStyle Magazine Fall 2007, NECN and WBZ TV Boston December 2025.

== Products ==
The store offers Museum of Bad Art merchandise, candies, hats, ornaments, MBTA items, custom tide clocks, soaps, handblown glass, stationery, Boston themed gifts and Boston artwork. Some of the unique items carried by MBTC include Spencer Peterman wooden spaulted bowls made from fallen trees replete with characteristic patterns formed by fungus inside the wood; Nantucket Lightship Baskets and hand-blown Limaj glass bowls; and handmade items like ornaments, dish cloths, hats and more.

== Business model ==
Massachusetts Bay Trading Co is an online E-commerce retailer, through which Internet users purchase gifts crafted by artists and companies located in Massachusetts and beyond. They collaborate with local businesses, event spaces and individuals to assist with personal and event gifts and gift bags.

The company has partnerships with Massachusetts arts societies including the Massachusetts Foundation for the Humanities to promote Massachusetts arts and cultural activities. MBTC also has a relationship with the Museum of Bad Art which now lives at the Dorchester Brewing Company.

Massachusetts Bay Trading Co provides a curation of small businesses and artists producing products in Massachusetts, Maine, Rhode Island, Vermont, Connecticut and New Hampshire.

== Name ==
The name draws from the Massachusetts Bay Company, the institution that founded the Massachusetts Bay Colony in Boston in 1628. The Massachusetts Bay Company was one of the first companies to carry their charter with them to America thereby enabling them to govern themselves locally.
