= Daily Table =

American non-profit grocery chain

Daily Table was an American chain of low price grocery stores.

== History ==
Daily Table was founded in 2012 by Doug Rauch, the former president of Trader Joe's. The not-for-profit company aimed to sell healthy food at a price point suitable for working low-income families. Daily Table sold inexpensive produce and pre-packaged meals. Its prices were significantly lower than the lowest options at a traditional grocery store. Daily Table considered itself the first not-for-profit supermarket of its kind. In early 2014, Sasha Purpura was appointed CEO.

Daily Table opened its first store in Dorchester, Massachusetts, on June 4, 2015. It subsequently opened stores in Roxbury, Massachusetts, Cambridge, Massachusetts, Mattapan, Massachusetts and Salem, Massachusetts.

The Dorchester store was set up like a boutique grocery with wood crates and a window to a food preparation area. The company had plans to expand to Detroit, Los Angeles, New York, and San Francisco.

On May 12, 2025, Daily Table discontinued operations, citing the challenges of the COVID-19 pandemic and historically high levels of food price increases which made sustaining Daily Table increasingly difficult. Rauch said, "The final straw was the current funding climate, including freezes on USDA grants."
