= Netmorf =

Netmorf Inc. was a Boston, Massachusetts based company that made a mobile application server "SiteMorfer." The application server provided an XML language to author web content such that it would be rendered into a variety of then available Phones and PDAs. SiteMorfer generated a device-independent XML that was later rendered into device specific-ML.

The company raised Series A funding of $610,000 from private investors and $12 Million in Series B funding from VantagePoint Venture Partners. NetMorf opened about 80 offices worldwide and grew rapidly. The company ran out of money trying to obtain a Series C funding. NetMorf shut its doors on March 16, 2001, and applied for Chapter 7 bankruptcy.
