= No Sweat Apparel =

American clothing company

- Trade name: No Sweat
- Industry: Apparel
- Founded: 2000
- Products: Sneakers (formerly), T-shirts, sweatpants, hoodies

No Sweat Apparel ('No Sweat) is an American company founded in 2000 with the goal of establishing union-made clothing as the gold standard for sweatshop-free apparel.

== Growth ==
The company experienced meteoric growth in 2004–05 following the launch of their No Sweat sneaker, a Converse look alike, shortly after Nike bought the iconic Chuck Taylor all-star. No Sweat put a spec sheet in the shoe box that detailed the wages and benefits received by their workers and challenged Nike to do the same. No Sweat's challenge to Nike was covered by AP, NPR, The Boston Globe and many other media outlets around the world.

After rapid expansion to over 200 fair trade stores around the world in 2005, No Sweat lost their union sneaker factory in 2006. Unwilling to switch to a non-union vendor, the company was never able to replace its hot product. No Sweat finally had to close its retail divisions and passed through bankruptcy in 2011.

Since 2012 No Sweat changed its focus to wholesale. The company sells T-shirts, sweatpants and hoodies in the U.S.

== See also ==
- Rhone Apparel
- Birdwell (clothing)
