= Harvard Brewing Company =

Defunct brewing company from Massachusetts

The Harvard Brewing Company was a brewery located in Lowell, Massachusetts, founded by Lowell native John H. Coffey, who owned a provisions shop in the same city, and John J. Joyce, who ran a bottling establishment there. Originally established as the Consumer's Brewing Company in 1893, it was renamed the Harvard Brewing Company in 1898 after a group of New York businessmen purchased it to distinguish themselves from the other local breweries. Stockholders of the company were from different parts of New England and New York, and elected Joyce as the company president and Coffey as the secretary and general manager. The company expanded its product lineup with $1000 Pure Beer Crimson Label, Dark Special, Brown Autumn Ale, Old Stock Porter, Sparkling Pale Ale, and Present Use Porter. The success of the company spurred a modernization of its equipment and buildings, expanding the brewery significantly. By 1914, its bottling house was one of the largest breweries in New England. The success of the Harvard Brewing Company resulted in them being heavily involved in the local politics of Lowell. However, they were disliked by many and faced criticism. Joyce and the other managers at the company were arrested under charges of conspiracy; however, the death of one of the witnesses resulted in charges being dropped.

In its early years, the company workforce was full of German immigrants, and in 1886 they formed the National Union of United Brewery Workmen, becoming one of the first trade unions in the nation to win an 8-hour work week. The Harvard Brewing Company is historically notable for its role in the largest Prohibition-era raid in New England, an event that highlighted the widespread resistance to alcohol bans in the region.

== Prohibition and the 1925 raid ==
With the legal market for alcoholic beer eliminated by national Prohibition in 1920, executive Dr. Richard H.P. Juerst attempted to keep the business alive by producing and selling legal non-alcoholic beverages, including colas, ginger ale, and "near-beer", a beverage with an alcohol content of less than 0.5%. When this strategy proved financially unsuccessful, executives Fredrick Quinn and Bartholomew Schannel increased the alcohol content of their "near-beer" lineup just past the federal restrictions. This illegal activity culminated in a major federal action on August 19, 1925, following a months-long investigation. The incident began when a truck carrying 100 barrels of illegal Harvard Brewing Company Beer was hijacked in Lowell. A crowd of hundreds of local residents rushed to claim the barrels, leading to chaos and physical altercations. After the commotion subsided, only 24 barrels of the original 100 remained. Police pursued one of the hijacker's cars nearly into the neighboring town of Chelmsford before it crashed; the occupants fled on foot.

Anticipating the raid, brewery workers had locked the doors and attempted to destroy evidence by dumping nearly 500 barrels of beer into the adjacent River Meadow Brook. When Federal agents from Boston arrived, they were initially denied entry for lack of a warrant. Upon hearing the sound of barrels being smashed inside, they forced the door open, causing a five-inch cascade of beer to flow over the steps. The subsequent raid resulted in the confiscation of over 100,000 gallons of full-strength beer, making it the largest seizure in New England during the Prohibition era. The brewery's directors faced years of legal troubles after the raid; however, charges were dropped against company officials except for two of the owners and a manager, who were given fines between $150 and $500. The loss of the brewery's chief revenue source led to the brewery being auctioned off by Lowell real estate agent Walter Guyette, who then sold it to the bank.

== Post-Prohibition decline and seizure ==
Nearing the end of Prohibition, in 1932 a group of New York investors led by Erwin Lange purchased the brewery and resumed operations. Lange was made as president, Walter Blumenthal was made secretary, and Guyette was made a director. The brewery went through a complete modernization, and by 1933 with the end of Prohibition, its bottling house capacity reached 1000 barrels of beer a day. The company was marketing Green Label Lager, Harvard Full Stock Ale, Export Beer and Porter. However, despite the initial success, the company was nearing bankruptcy. The ownership was changed again, this time to Fritz Von Opel, who purchased 97% of the shares, with his father buying the remaining 3%. Leadership was changed, with Guyette now as general manager. The company managed to turn things around and restore its previous success, until 1942 when Von Opel was arrested. He was imprisoned in Palm Beach, Florida after being accused of being a “potentially dangerous enemy alien”, despite being a citizen of Liechtenstein. To make matters worse, a German employee at the brewery was arrested for transmitting radio messages to the German government. The government then seized the brewery under the Office of Alien Property Custodian. Von Opel fought the seizure all the way to the U.S. Supreme Court but was unsuccessful. The brewery remained under government control through the 1940s and into the 1950s, during which time the popularity of its beer plummeted.

== Final years ==
Political pressure on Dwight Eisenhower's administration caused the government to finally sell the brewery in 1956 to the Fort Knox Construction Company, based in Miami, Florida. That same year, the construction company sold the brewery to Peter Doelger, Inc. Of New York for $2,000,000. Due to the poor financial situation the Harvard Brewing Company was in, Doelger shut down the Lowell brewery, and stripped it of its equipment. A fire ripped through the property in 1957, destroying most of the buildings, and another fire followed later. Most of what remained was razed in 1963 when the land was cleared for a shopping center.

== Legacy ==
The 1925 raid on the Harvard Brewing Company is emblematic of the widespread defiance of Prohibition laws in Lowell. The city had previously seen a surge in liquor purchases in the days leading up to the state's early adoption of Prohibition on June 30, 1919. This history is physically preserved at the historic Worthen House in Lowell, which features a prohibition-era panel behind its bar that was originally used to hide alcohol from authorities.
