= The Fullbridge Program =

Educational technology company

Fullbridge
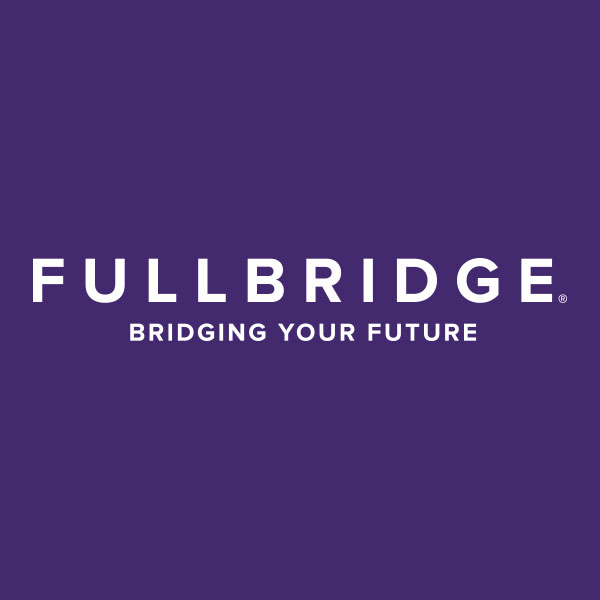
- Type: Private
- Industry: Education technology
- Founded: 2009
- Founder: Peter Olson and Candice Carpenter Olson
- Headquarters: Boston, Massachusetts, United States
- Area served: Worldwide
- Website: fullbridge.com

The Fullbridge Program is a learning curriculum held by educational technology company Fullbridge, Inc. Which teaches basic business techniques, and helps individuals bridge the knowledge and skills gap.

== History ==
Fullbridge Inc. was founded by former Random house chairman Peter Olson and his wife, iVillage founder Candice Carpenter Olson, in 2010. Fullbridge started out in Harvard Square, Cambridge, MA, and later moved to Downtown Boston, MA.

In January 2012, Fullbridge launched a pilot program aimed at college students and recent graduates, and subsequently focused on larger programs that summer. Then Fullbridge established a suite of vertical business-to-business programs for law firms, consulting firms, financial firms, service organisations, universities, and corporations. In September 2012, Fullbridge partnered with Andrews Kurth to expand the law firm's attorney professional development program. Andrews Kurth was the third law firm in the United States to partner with Fullbridge.

Fullbridge has worked in the Kingdom of Saudi Arabia helping young women prepare for new vocational opportunities and offered a four-week Business Fundamentals Program at Prince Sultan University. In 2015, Fullbridge expanded its partnership with Prince Sultan University to "enhance the way undergraduates and recent graduates in Saudi Arabia are prepared for productive and successful careers."

In 2012, Fullbridge received $5.5 million in funding from GSV Capital Corp., Tomorrow Ventures, and Harris Preston. In summer 2013, The Fullbridge Program was presented at Red Rocks Community College in Arvada, Colorado. Fullbridge secured $15.4 million through the sale of a series of preferred stock in 2015. The round was led by learning innovation investor GSV Capital.

In the spring of 2016, Olson and Carpenter resigned and the board hired Quadrant Management to help raise new funds and take the company to profitability. A newly installed board brought in a new CEO in May. In December 2018, the CEO was replaced by Fullbridge's CMO, Steve Brazell.

Fullbridge reached profitability in 2019.

In September 2019, Fullbridge launched its fourteenth round of training at Prince Sultan University. The program enables students to experience a work environment within the Fullbridge Lab before experiencing it in a company environment, thus serving as a bridge between academic and work environments.

In February 2020, in association with the Misk Foundation, Fullbridge presented an all new workshop, "You 2.0: How to Upgrade Your Brand for an Uncertain Future" at Al Yamamah University in Riyadh. The workshop is part of the Career Services Centre's plans to empower perspective graduates with the skills they need for their professional careers.

In March 2020, Fullbridge completed the first SPE-KSA Young Professionals' program You 2.0 with "a deep dive into three essential skills needed by the future workforce: Critical Thinking, Creative Thinking and Emotional Intelligence." The SPE-KSA has more than 11,000 members, and is the largest individual member organisation serving managers, engineers, scientists and other professionals worldwide in the upstream segment of the oil and gas industry.
