= Traveling Vineyard =

- Type: Private
- Industry: Wine, direct sales
- Founded: 2001
- Headquarters: Ipswich, Massachusetts
- Services: Winery
- Website: www.travelingvineyard.com

Traveling Vineyard is an American multi-level marketing company based in Ipswich, Massachusetts, that sells wine. The company was founded in 2001, and in 2010 it was purchased by Richard Libby and restructured.

It is marketed by means of approximately 5,000 Independent representatives. Traveling Vineyard representatives, called Wine Guides, pay one-time fees, and in return, the company sends them a Success Kit with wine education materials (including notes on individual wine varietals and food pairings), sample accessories, tasting glasses, and ten bottles of wine for the first tastings. Traveling Vineyard also provides website setup and access to training and support.

== Direct Selling Association ==
Traveling Vineyard is a member of the Direct Selling Association, which holds member companies accountable to ethical standards and policies that protect independent salespeople and consumers. The company is also a member of the Better Business Bureau. Traveling Vineyard uses the party plan method of direct selling.

== Wine tastings ==
Wine Guides connect with event hosts from their social networks to arrange free, in-home wine tastings. Wine Guides help hosts prepare for the event and then present guests with specific wines they can taste with the opportunity to order. Wine Guides make marketing fees from their sales to customers, not from how many people they recruit to be on their team.

== Sommology ==
In 2013, Traveling Vineyard launched Sommology. Sommology is a food and wine pairing educational resource. It was created in collaboration with Eddie Osterland, America's first Master Sommelier.

== Company history ==
Traveling Vineyard was founded in 2001. In April 2010, the company declared Chapter 7 bankruptcy. In November 2010, Richard Libby and other investors purchased the Traveling Vineyard assets out of bankruptcy and restarted the company. As of May 2017, Traveling Vineyard has over 5,000 independent Wine Guides in 40 states in the United States.

In 2020, Traveling Vineyard received a Double Gold medal at the San Francisco International Wine Competition for its 2018 Cucharon Red Blend (Argentina) in the under-$25 non-Bordeaux blends category.

== Regulatory history ==
In the 2005 ruling Granholm v. Heald, the Supreme Court held that Michigan and New York states violated the Dormant Commerce Clause by permitting in-state wineries to ship directly to consumers but prohibiting out-of-state wineries to ship directly to consumers.

Since then, individual states have been opening their shipping and allowing Traveling Vineyard to grow as a winery. The Wine Institute and Free The Grapes have been instrumental in lobbying for the ability for out-of-state wineries to ship wine directly to consumers.
