= 2 Minute Medicine =

American medical publisher

2 Minute Medicine, Inc.
- Industry: Publishing, News Media, Web Syndication
- Founded: Boston, MA (2012)
- Founder: Marc D. Succi, MD
- Headquarters: Boston, MA
- Area served: Worldwide
- Key people: Marc D. Succi(Editor-in-Chief) Andrew Cheung, Leah H. Carr, Leah Bressler(Managing Editors) Ravi Shah(VP Strategy)
- Products: Wire service, Medical Textbooks
- Services: Medical news production, syndication, and licensing
- Website: 2minutemedicine.com/about

2 Minute Medicine, Inc. is a peer-reviewed and physician-led medical publishing and original news syndication company. It was founded in 2012 by Marc D. Succi, a physician at Massachusetts General Hospital/Harvard Medical School. 2 Minute Medicine is a content licensing group, licensing their content to industry companies, libraries, and higher-education institutions including Harvard University. They license their content through a system known as the 2 Minute Medicine Syndication Engine. Their textbook arm, the 2 Minute Medicine Physician Press, publishes various education textbooks including the Classics in Medicine and The Classics in Radiology.
