= Nantucket lightship basket =

Type of basket

Nantucket lightship baskets are a type of basket originating, in the 19th century on lightships on Nantucket Island. Lightship baskets are all made from rattan and wood, have an odd number of staves, a solid wooden base, a nailed and lashed rim, a rattan weaver, and are woven over a mold. Oak, pine, and ash are the most traditional type of wood used on baskets, but today many other types are used, such as cherry and ebony. Often modern lightship baskets incorporate multiple types of wood.

== History ==
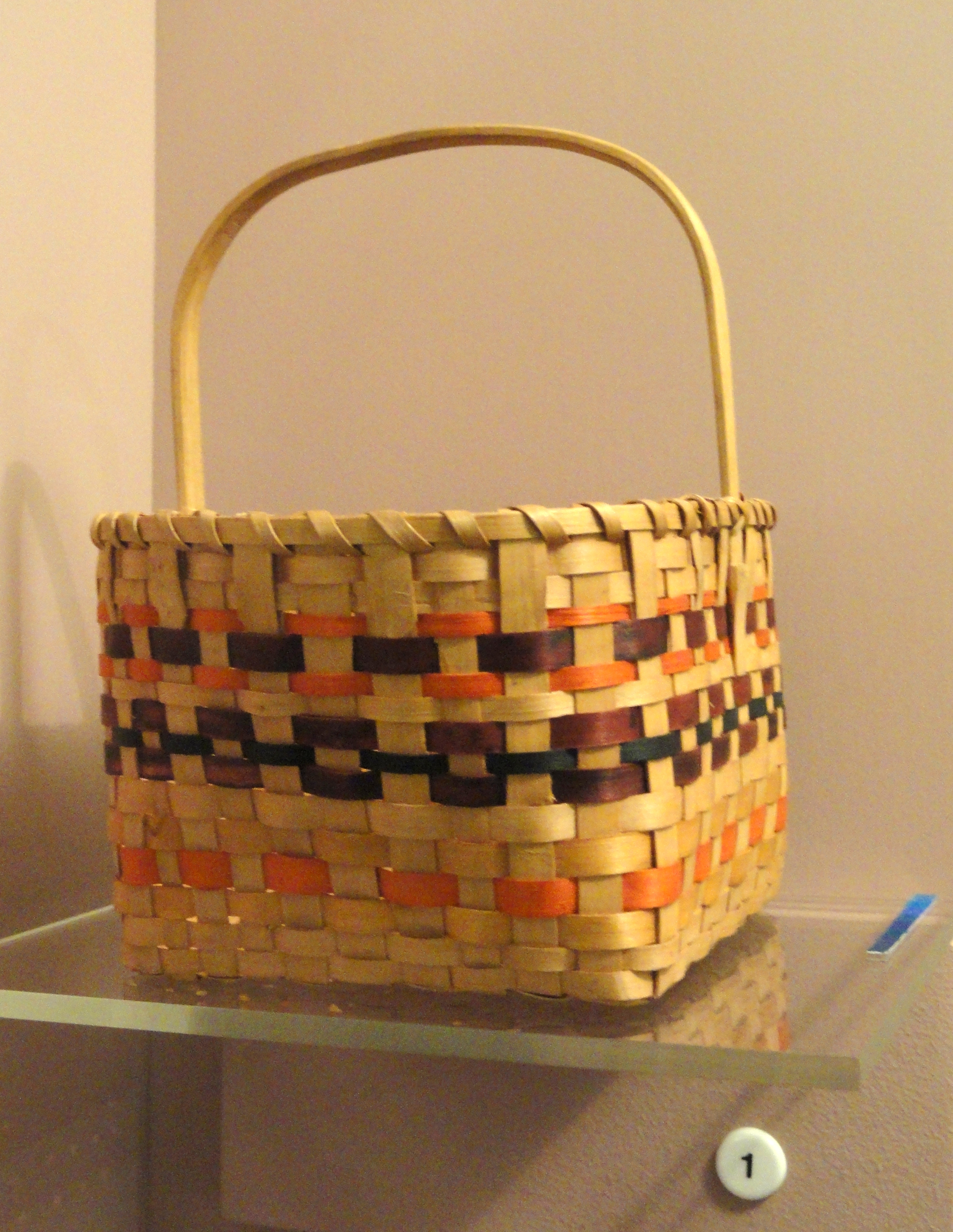
Native American Wampanoag basket - Peabody Museum of Archaeology and Ethnology at Harvard University

=== Origin ===
Baskets began being made on Nantucket Island by Native Americans of the Wampanoag Nation; these were generally of the splint type, and bear little resemblance to Nantucket lightship baskets. Nevertheless, these early baskets may have inspired later basket makers on Nantucket and aboard the lightships. The earliest form of basket made by white settlers on Nantucket, originated on whaleships in the early 1800s. These baskets were made free form (without a mold) and are thus only vaguely similar to later lightship baskets. These baskets, however, do begin to show early principles of lightship basket design, often incorporating a solid wooden base and a rattan weaver. The inspiration is thought to be based upon barrel manufacture due to the similar nature of a solid base and wooden staves. The use of rattan in basket making is most likely due to whalers picking up the material while sailing in the South Pacific.

The first true lightship baskets were made in the mid- to late 1800s aboard the lightship stationed on the Nantucket Shoals. The first lightship station on the Nantucket Island Shoal was established in June 1854 and crewed by six men. Deployments aboard the lightship often lasted for 30 days and the crewmembers generally had little to do. The earliest lightship baskets begin appearing in the 1860s and are generally of more utilitarian form. The first purse style basket with a lid was made by Lightship Captain Charles Ray (1798–1884), and is relatively similar to the type sold today. Lightship basket bases, rims, and staves tended to be made on-island, with lightship crewmembers bringing these items on board the ship to do the actual weaving, and help pass the time. The molds were originally made from old cut-up ships' masts. According to the Nantucket Lightship Basket Museum, some of these early lightship basket makers included: "Captain Davis Hall, Captain Andrew Sandsbury, Roland Folger, Thomas W. Barrallay, William D. Appleton, George W. Ray, Charles F. Ray, Joe Fisher, Charlie Sylvia, SB Raymond and Isaac Hamblin." Lightship baskets stopped being made on board the Nantucket lightships in 1900, when the government stopped allowing crewmembers to spend time doing so. The process continued on Nantucket Island. José Formoso Reyes began making the first true lightship basket purses in the 1940s, calling them "Friendship Baskets" after learning the craft from Captain Charles Ray's grandson Mitchel Ray. Charlie Sayles, Sr. is credited with creating the original Ivory Whale adornment for a basket top in the 1940s, a practice that is ubiquitous today.

=== Use ===
Nantucket lightship baskets were originally designed as multi-purpose baskets to carry and store shopping, vegetables, and stray items about the home. Crewmen aboard the Nantucket lightships made most for sweethearts and spouses on Nantucket, or for sale. Baskets could generally be purchased between $1.50 for small basket up to $50.00 for larger or more elaborate pieces. Most baskets were sold to Islanders, although a tourist trade quickly developed. Lightship baskets began being used as purses in the 1900s and still are today. True Nantucket lightship baskets currently start at about $500 and can cost up to hundreds of thousands of dollars. Poorly made knock-offs, however, can be had for far less. After José Reyes invented the "Friendship Basket" lightship basket purses began being given as gifts, as signs of long-term friendship. After the development of the "Friendship Basket" it began to be common for girls to receive a lightship basket purse as a gift after graduating from Nantucket High School.

== Types ==
=== Round basket ===
Round baskets are the most common form of lightship basket made, and the easiest to manufacture. The very first lightship baskets made were of this variety. Round baskets often have the greatest range of sizes, but are most often seen without a lid.

=== Oval basket ===
Oval baskets began appearing soon after the round baskets and are only marginally more difficult to make. Oval baskets are the shape generally used for "Friendship Basket" purses, often incorporating a lid. The size and shape of the oval can vary, but traditional "Friendship baskets" are always eight inches.

=== Square basket ===
Square baskets are the most difficult form (speaking only of shape) to make. Due to this fact they tend to be less common than round or oval baskets, but are still seen relatively frequently. Square baskets generally do not have a lid, but varieties with lids are known to exist.

=== Nesting baskets ===
Nesting baskets are a series of lightship baskets made of diminishing size designed to fit neatly inside one another. Nesting baskets began being made early on aboard the Nantucket lightships. The smallest baskets can be the size of a thimble with only a half-inch diameter to multiple feet in diameter. In nesting basket sets though it is more common to see a range between a two-inch diameter basket and a fourteen-inch diameter.

=== Miniature baskets ===
Miniature baskets are a more recent development, as they often require advanced tools to manufacture. Miniature baskets can take any form (round and oval though are the most common, in that order) but must have a diameter less than two inches to be distinguished simply from a small basket. Astronaut Daniel W. Bursch wove a set of miniature nesting baskets while at the International Space Station. Miniature baskets are often put on thin chains and worn as necklaces by women.

== Manufacture ==
Nantucket lightship baskets are still made on Nantucket Island by local artisans such as Manny Dias and Timothy D. Parsons, and classes are still taught to local Nantucket children through programs run by the Nantucket Lightship Basket Museum. Antique and modern made baskets can be purchased by a variety of dealers throughout the island. Poorly made fake lightship baskets are produced in China and sell for often as little as a hundred dollars. These fake baskets are made on an assembly line and use plastic rather than ivory as well as lower quality hollow wood.

=== Parts of the basket ===
- Mould (solid wood shape for the basket, removed after weaving)
- Base (made from a solid piece of wood)
- Stave (made from wood or rattan)
- Weaver (long thin piece of rattan)
- Inner Rim (made from wood)
- Outer Rim (made from wood)
- Cane filler/top cane (thin piece of rattan)
- Cross lashing, lashing (thin piece of rattan, usually the same size as the weaver)
- Escutcheon Pin (brass)
- Handle/Bail (wood)
- Button (knobs on side of the basket by the handle, usually made from whale ivory)
- Wooden Ear (wood)
- Plug (wood or whale ivory)

=== Construction ===
Lightship baskets are woven from the bottom to the top and start with a solid wooden base that has a groove cut around the outside. The base is carved, sanded, and polished then attached to the top of a solid wood mold. The attachment is usually done with a screw and plastic washer. The staves are then made either from pieces of rattan, or thin slats of wood. The staves are tapered at the top and soaked in water (rattan staves only require a brief dampening). The staves are then inserted into the groove cut into the base. An odd number of staves must always be used to allow the weaver to continue running down the basket, if an even number of staves were used the weaver would end up having to skip a stave. Generally baskets contain between 31 and 51 staves (although many baskets contain more, or fewer) with the stave width being relative to the size of the basket. The staves are kept tight onto the mold with a thick rubber band. A long thin piece of rattan is used as the weaver.

The weaver is placed into the groove on the base and runs around the basket going over-then-under every stave. Right-handed people tend to weave clockwise, whereas left-handed people tend to weave counter clockwise. At the beginning it is more difficult as the stave must be carefully pulled from the rubber band and re-inserted without damage. Most people tend to dampen the weaver as they work. When the weaver reaches the end it must be spliced, a process by which a new piece of weaver is woven over of the last piece and trimmed so as not to be visible. Once the weaving has passed the bottom curve of the basket the rubber band can be removed and weaving generally speeds up. Once the basket is fully woven it is removed from the mold.

The inner rim is sanded and polished as well as the outer rim. The inner rim fits inside the basket and the outer rim fits on the outside. Every third stave a brass escutcheon pin (basically a small nail) is driven through the outer rim, through the stave and into the inner rim. The tops of the staves are then all trimmed flush with the rim and a piece of rattan is used to lash the two together. As the lasher goes around another strip of rattan is used to cover the gap between the inner and outer rims. The lasher can go around twice to get a cross-lashed effect.

At this point a handle (if used) can be attached by riveting directly to the rim, or to a wooden ear, which would have been inserted during weaving as a type of stave. The hole in the base through which the screw attached the base to the mold is finally plugged, either with a piece of similar or contrasting wood, or with a piece of whale ivory.

== See also ==
- Lightship Nantucket
