= Blue Hills Brewery =

Brewery in the United States

- Industry: Alcoholic beverage
- Founded: 2008
- Founder: Andris Veidis and Peter Augis
- Headquarters: Canton, Massachusetts, USA
- Area served: Massachusetts
- Products: Beer
- Website: http://www.bluehillsbrewery.com/

Blue Hills Brewery is a brewery in Canton, Massachusetts, New England, USA. They are close to Great Blue Hill, which is where the name came from. Google currently lists them as closed.

== History ==
Blue Hills Brewery was established in May 2008 by Andris Veidis and Peter Augis. Veidis has been brewing since 1994, and has worked previously at Harpoon Brewery, and several other American breweries, including Boston Beer Works. Augis' background is in construction and architecture and designed the beer taps and the bar in the tasting area, which is shaped like a pilsner glass. Nine months after it was established, the brewery opened on January 15, 2009. Since then, the brewery has grown quickly: it sold 675 barrels of beer in 2009, 800 in the first 6 months of 2010, and according to the article in the Patriot Ledger: "...is potentially on track to sell 1,800 barrels in 2010". When they opened they were brewing an Extra pale ale, and an IPA. They currently brew six regular beers, and have several seasonal options.

== Beers ==
Name of Beer	Type of Beer	ABV %
Imperial Red IPA	Imperial IPA	9.00
Red Baron Ale	Irish red ale	5.00
Black Hops	Black IPA / Schwarzbier	6.75
India Pale Ale	American IPA	6.60
Wampatuck Wheat	Hefeweizen	4.80
Watermelon Wampatuck Wheat	Fruit or Vegetable Beer	4.80
Wampatuck Winter Wheat*	Dunkelweizen	6.80
Okto Brau*	Oktoberfestbier	5.80

A * denotes a seasonal or limited time beer. Source: BHB Products, Beer Advocate.

== Events ==
Blue Hills Brewery has participated in many community events in and around the Canton and Boston areas.

- On April 16 & 17, 2009 they participated in the 10th annual Boston Beer Summit.
- On June 15, 2010 they teamed up with Abby Park Restaurant to serve a 5 course "beer" dinner, in which every course was paired with a Blue Hills Beer.
- On June 19 & 20, 2010 they participated in the American Craft Beer Fest in Boston, Massachusetts at the Seaport World Trade Center.
- On October 2, 2010, Blue Hills was one of the beer brands served at the first ever “Brew at the Zoo”, held at Boston's Franklin Park Zoo. Other brews included Cape Ann Brewing Co., Mayflower Brewing Company, Narragansett Beer Company, Peak Organic Brewing Company, and Watch City Brewing Co.
- On September 19, 2010 they were part of Dedham's 4th Annual Oktoberfest.

Blue Hills also hosts a variety of events at the nearby Irish Culture Center in Canton. In October 2009, they held their own "Oktoberfest"; in June 2009 they held a "Beerfest"; and in July 2010 they held a "Summerfest". They also held a “Winterfest” at Blue Hills Ski Area on January 16, 2010.

== See also ==
- Beer in the United States
