= Greenfly (producer) =

Music producer and DJ

Greenfly is the artist name of Lawrence Green, a drum and bass music producer and DJ from Reading, England. His music style leans towards the more soul/funk influenced styles of drum'n'bass. He is currently signed to FF Recordings and has been releasing music since 2001. Greenfly also co-runs Subfactory, a free weekly drum'n'bass event in Reading, Berkshire, England.

== Biography ==
Greenfly first started making music at the age of eight when he taught himself to play the piano. Years later after playing various instruments (including guitar, drums, keyboards to name a couple) in many bands, he got into drum and bass around 1994 after hearing one of the Essential Mixes on BBC Radio 1. From then he got into music production and a couple of years later released his self-entitled debut album on Millennium Records, London. Following on from the global success of this he continued to make music and in 2001 his track "G-Funk" was signed by Good Looking Records. The track was an instant success and was voted 3rd best dnb tune of 2003 by a Mixmag poll as well as featuring on LTJ Bukem's Progressions Sessions CDs. Since then Greenfly has released several other tracks on Good Looking Records and over 30 singles on other labels such as V recordings, Camino Blue, FF Recordings, Zen, Red Mist and Strictly-Digital. Greenfly is still producing drum'n'bass for his own label, FF Recordings, as well as music for adverts, animations and websites. In 2009, he released his debut four track EP on FF entitled Playing Tunes.

== Discography ==
- Greenfly - Millennium Records (CD Album) 2001 (track listing:)
  - Slipstream
  - Ironside
  - Shark Attack
  - S-Axis
  - Make Me Feel
  - Sonar
  - Buzzfrog
  - Cloud 10
  - Another Reality
- G-Funk - Good Looking Records (12") 2002
- Mierda Hedionda - Cookin Records (CD) 2002
- Blue Corvette - Good Looking Records (12") 2003
- Electrofusion - Looking Good Records (12" ) 2003
- Gulfstream - Good Looking Records (12") 2004
- Biorhythms - Good Looking Records (12") 2004
- Future Colonies - Strictly Digital (MP3) 2005
- Hyperdermic - Strictly Digital (MP3) 2005
- Music Has A Voice - Strictly Digital (MP3) 2005
- Sandstorm - Strictly Digital (MP3) 2005
- Sunshine - Zen (MP3) 2005
- Sixteen - Red Mist Recordings (CD) 2006
- World of Love - FF Recordings (12") 2006
- Shining Light- FF Recordings (12") 2006
- Suelo Mas Alto (AMC Remix) - FF Recordings (12") 2006
- Neural Net - Camino Blue Recordings (12") 2006
- Control - Camino Blue Recordings (MP3) 2006
- Outer Rim - FF Recordings (12") 2006
- Stand Alone (feat Stealth) - FF Recordings (12") 2006
- One Love (feat Jewels) - FF Recordings (12") 2007
- Outer Rim (Kubiks Remix) - FF Recordings (12") 2008
- Hypnosis (feat Neil Mac) – FF Recordings (mp3) 2009
- Be There – FF Recordings (mp3) 2009
- Yeah Man – FF Recordings (mp3) 2009
- Playing Tunes (feat Neil Mac & Bird) – FF Recordings (mp3) 2009

Remixes

- Groove Diggerz - Good Times (Breakin Even 12") 2009
