= Grillo's Pickles =

American pickle brand

Grillo's Pickles is an American pickle brand headquartered in Westwood, Massachusetts. Founded in 2008 by Travis Grillo, who began selling pickles from a wooden cart in Boston Common using a family recipe. Grillo's was acquired by King's Hawaiian in 2021 and is now part of King's Hawaiian's parent company, Irresistible Foods Group.

== History ==
=== Founding ===
Travis Grillo grew up in Norwich, Connecticut, where he learned to make pickles each summer using a recipe that had been passed down through his family for about a hundred years. After studying art and design at Central Connecticut State University, Grillo had hoped to work as a footwear designer for Nike but was turned down for the job. He later said the rejection led him to reconsider his career while eating a pickle at his parents' house that summer, and he decided to start selling the family recipe rather than a design career.

In the summer of 2008, after moving to Boston, Grillo began making pickles and selling them out of his car, later building a wooden cart. He made the pickles at night in rented space at a produce warehouse and sold them during the day, sometimes wearing a pickle costume to draw attention.

Whole Foods Market became the first national retailer to carry the brand after a buyer noticed Grillo selling on the street. Grillo delivered the first order to a local store himself. The brand is also carried by smaller specialty grocers and online retailers.

=== Growth ===
By 2013, Grillo's Pickles was generating about a million dollars a year in sales, and distribution expanded into large national chains including Whole Foods Market and Walmart.

By 2019, Grillo's Pickles was selling more than five million pounds of pickles a year. The company also brought in outside investors during these years, including Breakaway Ventures, Centerman Capital and Food Retail Ventures.

=== Acquisition by King's Hawaiian ===
In April 2021, Grillo's Pickles was sold to King's Hawaiian for an undisclosed sum. Travis Grillo left the company around the time of the sale, and Adam Kaufman, who had been the company's chief operating officer and an operating partner at investor Centerman Capital, became president and later chief executive.

== Products ==
Grillo's sells refrigerated, cold-packed pickles in clear plastic tubs rather than the sealed glass jars.
