= PerkStreet =

PerkStreet Financial
- Trade name: PerkStreet
- Industry: Finance
- Founded: Boston, Massachusetts, United States (November, 2009)
- Defunct: August, 2013
- Fate: Defunct
- Headquarters: Boston, Massachusetts, United States
- Owner: Dan O'Malley
- Number of employees: 25
- Website: Perkstreet.com

PerkStreet Financial was an American-based virtual bank that offered checking and debit card accounts with cashback rewards. PerkStreet was one of the first so called Challenger Banks and was followed by players such as BankSimple (later renamed Simple) and Moven. The company was founded in Boston, Massachusetts in November 2009, and was led by former Capital One executive Dan O'Malley and Jason Henrichs. With no bank branches, PerkStreet Financial had low operating costs. However, a cashback rewards program that approached 2% for some debit card accounts turned out to be unsustainable, and contributed to the company's closure in 2013.

== History ==
The company had several early rounds of financing, including a $9 million Series B venture round. In May 2011, O'Malley claimed PerkStreet had "more customers than half the banks and credit unions in the country.” By that time, the company had 25 employees.

In August 2013, the bank announced it was closing and laying off all 25 employees. O'Malley revealed that PerkStreet Financial had paid out more than $4 million in cash-back rewards since its founding, and the rates were no longer sustainable. PerkStreet also suffered from years of low interest rates, which reduced margins, and had difficulty partnering with other financial institutions.

"That was all done in the midst of the ultra low-rate environment, so clearly the low-rate deposit environment was no surprise to the bank and it's [sic] investors ... Falling debit interchange rates didn't help, but they were Durbin exempt, so that wasn't as dramatic of a revenue hit as it was at the big banks. In fact, CEO Dan O'Malley told the NY Times last year that their interchange had remained unchanged.".

Deposits were reportedly protected by FDIC deposit insurance, but many customers were angry about the abrupt closure of their accounts and the end of the rewards program.

"Instead of honoring the current cashback balances, the company has decided to steal those perks ... Shame on PerkStreet for claiming all along to being a new, better way to bank. In the end, they turned out to be scummier and slimier than the average banking outfit.".

For years, financial guru Dave Ramsey was a prominent endorser of Boston startup PerkStreet Financial and its online-only checking accounts paired with rewards debit cards. But this week — after PerkStreet announced it would close in September and wouldn't pay out rewards earned by customers — Ramsey slammed the company on his popular radio show. "I'll find them eventually and strangle them, because that's not how you do business," Ramsey said, noting that two people on his own staff have accounts with PerkStreet.

According to the PerkStreet's website as of September 26, 2013, former PerkStreet customers can direct questions to issuing banks based on their debit account numbers. Customer questions associated with debit cards that begin with 5519 (or account numbers that start with 123) should be directed to The Bancorp Bank and questions associated with debit cards that begin with 5507 (or account numbers that start with 234) should be directed to Provident Bank. Broadly, account applications received before March 6, 2013 were issued by Bancorp; applications received after that date were issued by Provident Bank.
