= Mercury Brewing Company =

American brewery

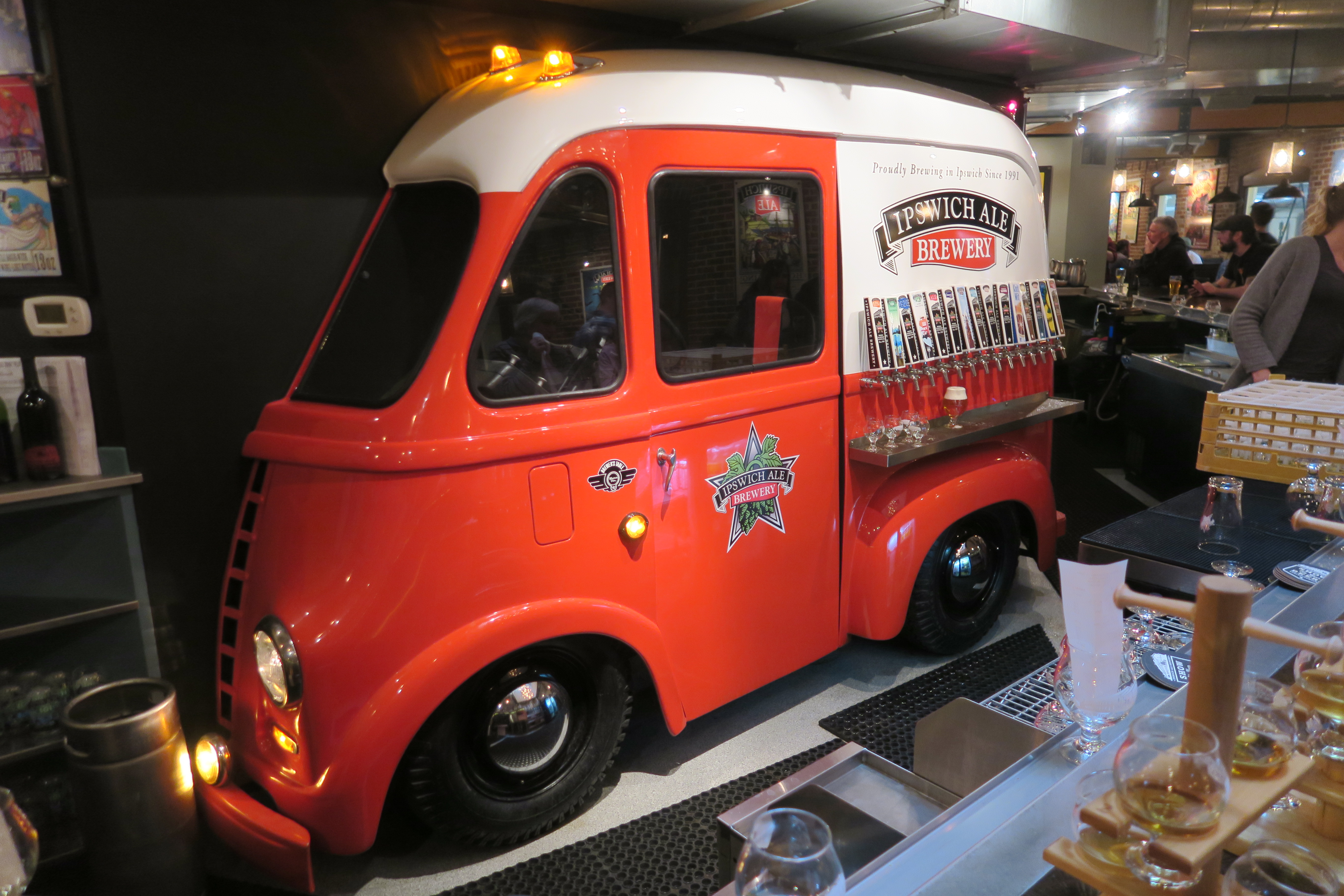
- Ipswich Ale Brewery
- Industry: Brewery
- Predecessor: Ipswich Brewing Co.
- Founded: 1999
- Headquarters: United States
- Products: Beer, soda
- Owner: Robert Martin
- Website: ipswichalebrewery.com

Mercury Brewing Company is a brewery formed in Ipswich, Massachusetts, USA in 1999 as the successor of Ipswich Brewing Co. In subsequent years the brand would return to its roots operating under the Ipswich Ale Brewery name. The company also operates an onsite restaurant the Ipswich Ale Brewer's Table.

== Brands ==
Mercury Brewing produces such brands as Ipswich Ale, Five Mile Ales, Stone Cat, and Mercury Soda Pop. In 1999, Mercury Brewing Company bought the Stone Cat brand from Modern Brewers in Cambridge, Massachusetts.

== History ==
Ipswich Brewing Company, founded in 1991 by Paul Sylva and Jim Beauvais, encompassed an initial product line of Ipswich Ale and Dark Ale, introduced on draft, in 64 fl oz growlers, and in 1-liter swing tops. The product line was extended in 1995 with the addition of Ipswich IPA and Oatmeal Stout. All styles were introduced in 12 fl oz bottles. Ipswich 1722 Commemorative Porter was introduced in 1996. In 1997, Ipswich Brewing Co. formed an alliance with United States Beverage for sales and marketing support and introduced Ipswich Winter Ale. Ipswich Brand was purchased by United States Beverage in 1999 but kept the brewery separately owned and operated. The product line was further extended in 1998 with Porter, Nut Brown, and Ipswich Ale Mustard. All packaged product was contracted by Clipper City Brewing Co., in Baltimore, MD.

Rob Martin purchased Ipswich Brewing Co. from Sylva and Beauvais in September 1999 and renamed the brewery "Mercury Brewing and Distribution Company". Martin further bought Stone Cat brand, which sells and self-distributes Stone Cat Ale, I.P.A., and E.S.B. In 2000, the Mercury Premium Soda line was established with 13 flavors of caffeine free, old-school sodas made with real sugar. The Stone Cat brand was expanded to include Blonde, Blueberry Ale, Hefewiezen, Octoberfest, Pumpkin Ale, Winter Lager, and Scotch Ale. Mercury also starts contract brewing for Dornbush and Farmington River beer companies. In 2001 the Mercury Bubbly Water line was introduced, but Dornbush ceased production. Cisco Brewers enlist Mercury to brew their Whale's Tail draft in 2002.

Mercury purchased Ipswich Ale brand from United States Beverage in 2003. This caused all Ipswich production to revert to Mercury. Ipswich Summer was introduced and Ipswich E.S.B. was discontinued. Ipswich was now available in Massachusetts, Rhode Island, and Connecticut. Endurance Brewing Company contracts Mercury to design a recipe and brew Endurance Pale Ale in 2004. Ipswich Harvest Ale was introduced as a Fall seasonal in 2005. Contracts grew to include Cisco Brewers Whale's Tail and Sankaty Light, Cape Ann Brewing's Fisherman Ale and Fisherman's IPA (no longer a Mercury contracted customer), and the entire Z Street portfolio.

As of 2006, new contracts included various Opa-Opa Steakhouse and Brewpub Ales, and John Harvard's Pale Ale and Amber Ale. Beer production topped 9700 BBLs and 15,000 cases of soda for 2006. Distribution of Ipswich was expanded to parts of Pennsylvania and New York City. In 2007, capacity expanded with the addition of three 80BBL fermentation tanks and three 128BBL bright tanks. Contract work expands to include Hook & Ladder, Offshore Ale, Sherwood Forest Brewers, and Kennebec River Brewing Company. Ipswich distribution is expanded to all of New Jersey and New Hampshire. Mercury now produces 47 different beers and 19 soft drinks. In 2007, beer production topped 14,000 bbl (434,000 gal), a 44% increase from 2006. Soda production came to 1180 bbl (36,580 gal), an increase of 22% from the previous year.

In 2009, the company accepted a contract to begin brewing the Clown Shoes Beer line at the facility. In 2011, Chapter 11 paperwork, was filed with the U.S. Bankruptcy Court in Boston in the first week of May, includes disputes between Ipswich Ale and Brewery Properties Group.

In 2023, a merger between Essex County Brewing Company and Ipswich Ale Company that the brands are calling a “Craft Brewing Alliance” that will combine operations at Ipswich Ale’s brewery and taproom at 2 Brewery Place in Ipswich.
