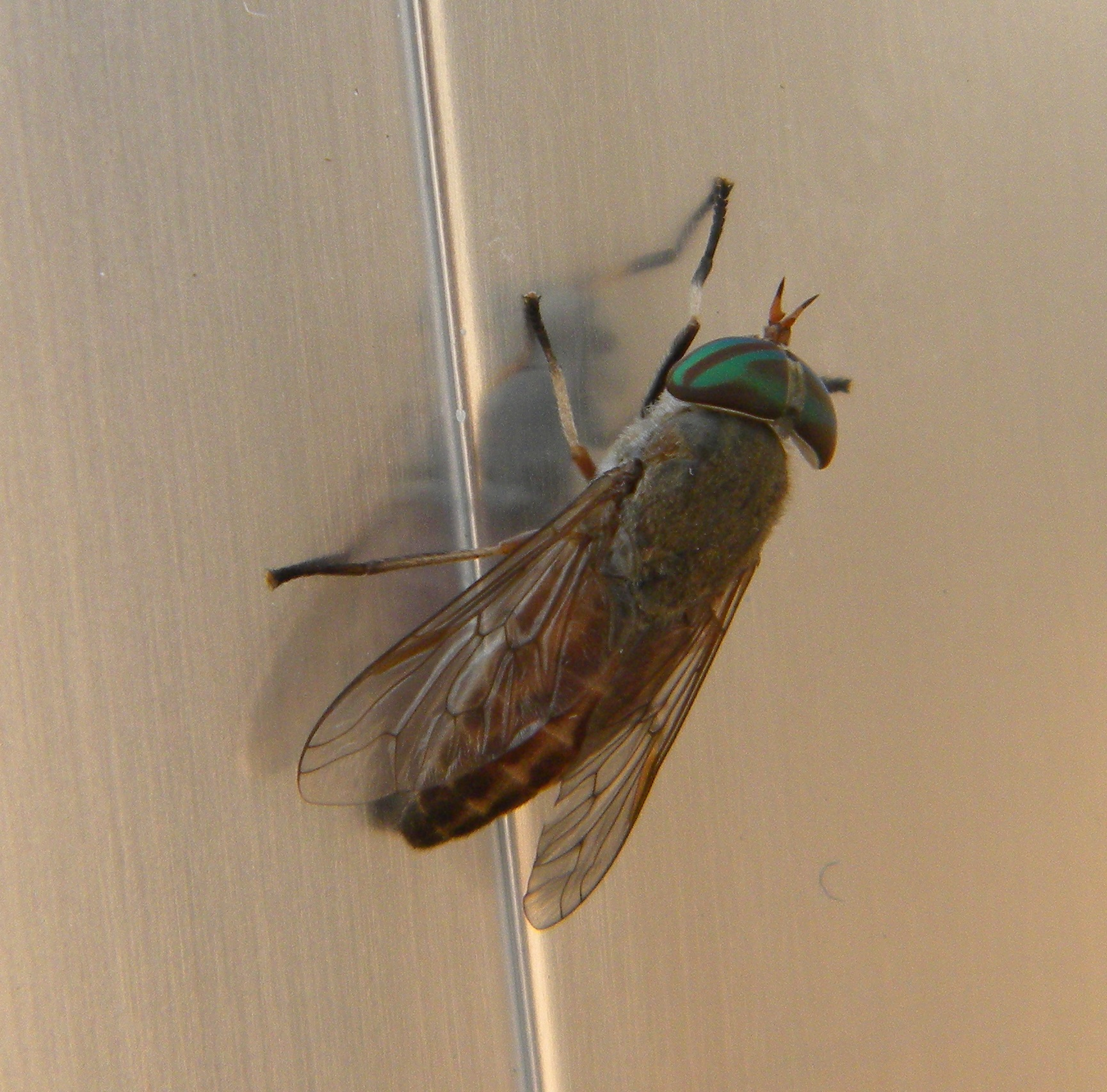

Scientific classification
- Kingdom: Animalia
- Phylum: Arthropoda
- Clade: Pancrustacea
- Class: Insecta
- Order: Diptera
- Family: Tabanidae
- Subfamily: Tabaninae
- Tribe: Tabanini
- Genus: Tabanus
- Species: T. nigrovittatus

Binomial name
- Tabanus nigrovittatus Macquart, 1847

Synonyms
- Tabanus allynii Marten, 1883; Tabanus contactus Walker, 1850; Tabanus floridanus Szilády, 1926; Tabanus fulvilineis Philip, 1958; Tabanus simulans Walker, 1848

= Tabanus nigrovittatus =

Species of insect

Tabanus nigrovittatus, also known as the greenhead horse fly, salt marsh greenhead, or simply the greenhead fly, greenhead or greenfly, is a species of horse-fly commonly found around the coastal marshes and wetlands of the Eastern United States. They are smaller than most horsefly species, instead being close in size to a common housefly. The biting females are a considerable pest to both humans and animals while they seek a source of blood protein to produce additional eggs: greenhead larvae develop in the mud of salt marshes, and adult flies mate and lay their first group of eggs in the marsh, but to lay more eggs a female fly needs to drink an animal's blood, and so female greenheads which have laid eggs fly inland to look for prey in the area bordering the marsh; they can stay on land looking for animals to bite for up to four weeks. Their bites itch, like those of mosquitoes, but are more painful, since greenheads feed by cutting a wound in the skin with scissor-like mouth parts and sucking the blood released through it. Females live for three to four weeks and may lay about 100 to 200 eggs per blood meal. The eggs are laid on the grass in a salt marsh; the larvae live in the intertidal mud of the salt marsh for one or two years, preying on other invertebrates, before pupating in early spring. The adult flies emerge in late spring and are most common from late June to August.

Greenheads are large enough that their population cannot be controlled with insecticide without damaging the ecosystem. Affected coastal communities often install specialized "black box traps" in marsh areas to help reduce T. nigrovittatus populations.
