= Bad Martha Brewing Company =

American microbrewery

Bad Martha Farmer’s Brewery
- Interactive map of Bad Martha Farmer’s Brewery
- Location: Martha's Vineyard, Edgartown, Massachusetts, United States
- Coordinates: 41.394218°N 70.527378°W
- Opened: 2013
- Owned by: Jonathan Blum
- Website: badmarthabeer.com

Active beers
Name	Type
Martha's Vineyard Ale	Pale Ale
Island IPA	IPA
Vineyard Honey Ale	Amber Ale

Seasonal beers
Name	Type
Vineyard Summer Ale	Pale Ale

Bad Martha Farmer’s Brewery (official company name) is an American microbrewery based on Martha’s Vineyard and founded in 2013 by Jonathan Blum, the sole owner of Bad Martha Farmer’s Brewery with locations in Edgartown, Martha’s Vineyard and Falmouth, MA.

== History ==
Bad Martha Beer first appeared in stores, bars and restaurants on Martha’s Vineyard in June 2013 with two ales Vineyard Summer Ale and Martha’s Vineyard Ale. All Bad Martha Farmer’s Brewery craft beers are uniquely brewed with hand-picked wild grape leaves grown on Martha’s Vineyard. ^{(26)} Bad Martha Farmer’s Brewery creates about 50 different craft beers each year using local ingredients from surrounding farms and makers including fruits, berries, beach plums, honey, oysters, chocolate, coffee.

In 2014, Bad Martha opened the first Bad Martha Farmer’s Brewery, a tasting barn modeled after the wine tasting rooms in Napa Valley. The flagship brewery tasting room is located in Edgartown on Martha’s Vineyard and features a changing selection of up to 10 beer varieties on tap brewed on site with a 7-barrel brewing system.

Blum opened a second Bad Martha Farmer’s Brewery in September 2019 in Falmouth, MA. This second brewery is bigger and has a 15-barrel brewing system that can expand to 30-barrels of production. It has a state-of-the-art canning line so their products have wider availability throughout the mainland and on Martha’s Vineyard. Bad Martha now cans all its own beer in Falmouth and continues to brew beer on premise at the Bad Martha Farmer’s Brewery in Edgartown for drinking in that taproom. Bad Martha Farmer’s Brewery locations have a beer garden atmosphere, indoor and outdoor seating, parking, bike racks and are handicap accessible. The Martha’s Vineyard location is open seasonally and the Falmouth location is open year-round. Visitors can drink free samples of beers and also buy brews by the glass or a flight paddle as well as growlers, crowlers and 4-pack, 16 oz. cans of certain styles. They offer food to go with the beers including cheese plates, charcuterie, crudité, pizzas and other snacks.

The beer is sold on Martha’s Vineyard, Falmouth, throughout Cape Cod and Boston’s South Shore.

Bad Martha Farmer’s Brewery is known for Bad Martha Beer which can be identified by a sensual dark haired mermaid logo. The legend of Bad Martha is on the company’s website. The mermaid once lured 17th century explorer Bartholomew Gosnold to “a field brimming with lush island grapes” on Martha’s Vineyard. Being a good Englishman, Gosnold decided to use the grapes as a secret ingredient in the ale he brewed for his crew. Today, Bad Martha brews its beer as Gosnold did with wild grape leaves hand-picked on Martha’s Vineyard.

The Bad Martha Farmer’s Brewery motto is ‘Get Bad. Do Good.’ Their mission is to create excellent craft beers and be a socially-responsible company that puts the community first. They donate the first portion of their profits to hunger-relief charities located where their beer is sold. They buy as many ingredients as possible from local farms and makers. They also give spent grains to local farmers for livestock feed.

Since the Company started, it has donated substantial profits to The Island Food Pantry, MV Boys & Girls Clubs and many others.

== Awards ==
Bad Martha Farmer’s Brewery has won 13 international beer awards since 2014. They were ranked the Top 2 Brewer in Massachusetts by Boston Magazine in 2018. In 2019, Martha’s Vineyard Ale, an English Special Bitters, won a second gold medal. Bad Martha’s other industry awards since 2014 include gold medals for Martha’s Vineyard Export Lager (Dortmunder Category) and Martha’s Vineyard Pumpkin Pie Bock (Fruit & Spice Category). Silver Awards were given to Cucumber Jalapeno Kolsch (Fruit & Spice Lager Category) and Vineyard Summer Ale (Light Ale-Golden Category). Bronze Awards were given to Martha’s Vineyard White IPA (Belgian Witbier Category), Martha’s Vineyard Tim’s Beach Plum Ale (Fruit & Spice Belgian Category), Martha’s Vineyard Roscoe’s Brown Ale (Brown-Porter Category), Pumpkin Pie Bock (Fruit & Spice Belgian Category) and Bourbon Barrel Aged Strong Ale (Old Ale/Strong Ale Category).
