= OptiRTC =

American technology company

OptiRTC, Inc.
- Company type: Private
- Industry: Environmental Technology
- Founded: December 2014; 11 years ago
- Headquarters: Boston, Massachusetts
- Key people: Marcus Quigley(Founder /CEO)
- Products: OptiNimbus; OptiStratus; OptiCumulus
- Website: www.optirtc.com

OptiRTC is an American technology company that has developed a software as a service platform for civil infrastructure. The OptiRTC platform is a cloud-native platform that integrates sensors, forecasts, and environmental contexts to actively control stormwater infrastructure. The OptiRTC platform is built on Microsoft Azure and uses internet of things technology to predicatively manage distributed water systems.

== History ==
In June 2011, the OptiRTC team partnered with ioBridge to develop smart city tech based on ioBridge's hardware services and OptiRTC's platform.

In November 2013, the OptiRTC team was assigned a patent for "Combined water storage and detention system and method of precipitation harvesting and management" that was co-invented by Marcus Quigley.

In November 2014, the New York Economic Development Corporation (NYCEDC) selected Opti technology as the winner of the first Smart City Expo World Congress.

In December 2014, OptiRTC was formally incorporated as an independent company through a spin-out from Geosyntec Consultants.

In January 2015, the Water Environment Research Foundation (WERF) published a research paper on High Performance Green Infrastructure, which focused primarily on distributed real-time control of stormwater infrastructure.

In January 2016, Opti began working with Particle to provide the communications layer for Opti's products.

In October 2018, Opti was commissioner by Albany’s Department of Water and Water Supply to install its underground smart water management system in Washington Park Lake as well as one of Albany’s constructed wetlands.
