= Cisco Brewers =

Brewery, distillery and winery in Massachusetts

Coordinates: 41°15′48.7″N 70°7′52.5″W

- Location: Nantucket, Massachusetts, United States
- Opened: 1992; 33 years ago
- Parent: AB InBev
- Website: www.ciscobrewers.com

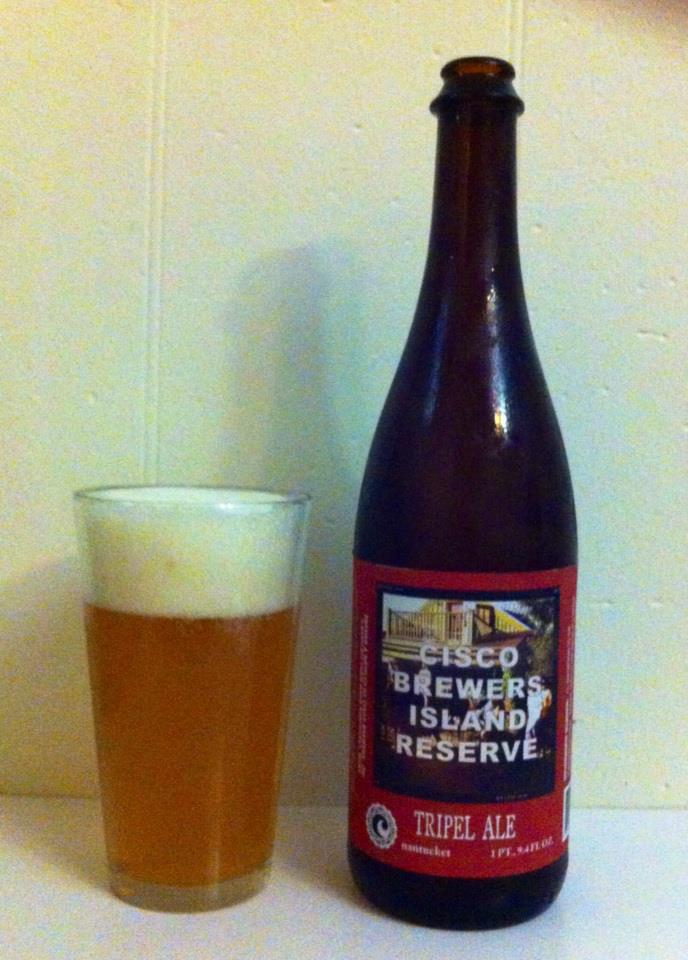
Cisco's Tripel

Cisco Brewers is a brewery, distillery, and winery founded in 1992 in Nantucket, Massachusetts, by Randy and Wendy Hudson. It was acquired by Craft Brew Alliance in 2018 and by AB InBev in 2020.

== History ==
=== Nantucket Vineyard ===
Nantucket Vineyard, a sister company of Cisco Brewers, was founded in 1981 by Dean and Melissa Long. After failing to grow grapes on Nantucket Island due to unsuitable climate and soil conditions, Dean and Melissa began to import grapes from California, Washington, and New York.

=== Relocations ===
In 1992, Randy and Wendy Hudson moved into a loft above Dean and Melissa Long’s winery to help with production. They began producing beer on the site, with the entire process taking place outside, except for the cold-room. This outdoor brew space was called a nanobrewery.

In 1996, the Hudsons moved to a new building called the Mortan Building. But, due to the construction, Cisco Brewers could not sell beer in July and August of 1996. This event created the company’s motto, “Nice beer, if you can get it.”

=== Triple Eight Distillery ===
In 1997, Dean Long applied to the Commonwealth of Massachusetts for a license to manufacture high-proofed spirits. The license was approved in the fall of 2000, and he began distilling single-malt Notch Whiskey. The plan called for the whiskey to be aged for five years; to generate income, the decision was made to also produce vodka because it could be sold immediately. The name for the vodka, Triple Eight Distillery, came from it being produced with water from Nantucket well #888. To help raise capital for the production of the vodka, people were allowed to purchase futures on barrels of Notch Whiskey.

=== Craft Brew Alliance ===
In 2015, Craft Brew Alliance purchased a minority stake in Cisco Brewers. The acquisition also had Cisco Brewers start production of their beers at Craft Brew Alliance's Portsmouth, New Hampshire, facility and make Craft Brew Alliance their master distributor.

In 2018, Craft Brew Alliance wholly acquired Cisco Brewers for $23 million.

== Partnerships ==
Cisco Brewers supports the shark research activities of OCEARCH. As a result, a great white shark tagged by OCEARCH in October 2016 near Nantucket, Massachusetts, was named "Cisco" after the brewery. The brewery also produces Shark Tracker Light Lager in support of OCEARCH.
