= Newburyport Brewing Company =

- Industry: Alcoholic beverage
- Founded: 2012
- Headquarters: Newburyport, Massachusetts; United States
- Products: Beer
- Production output: 10,000 barrels
- Owner: Chris Webb, Bill Fisher
- Website: nbptbrewing.com

Newburyport Brewing Company is a brewery in Newburyport, Massachusetts.

== History ==
Newburyport Brewing Company was founded in 2012 by recently arrived area residents Chris Webb, Bill Fisher, and Brewmaster Mike Robinson. The brewery is housed in an 8,330-square-foot facility and is the first brewery in the state to just can and keg its beers. Statewide distribution began in March 2013 by the Massachusetts Beverage Alliance, whose network consists of Atlas Distributing Inc., Burke Distributing, Colonial Wholesale Beverage, Commercial Distributing Company and Merrimack Valley Distributing Company. In March 2014 the brewery was noted as being among the country's fastest-growing breweries with over 5000 barrels produced. In May 2014 the brewery invested in new equipment to increase production to 15,000 barrels.

== Products ==
Three beer styles in cans are offered: Newburyport Pale Ale ("The Flagship"), Green Head IPA ("The Beer That Bites You Back"), Plum Island Belgian White ("Belgian Style Ale"), Melt Away Session IPA ("Serve Cold. Melt Away"), and the newest offering, Das Kölsch ("Here's To Discovery"). Other styles, such as Joppa Stout, and limited editions, like Yankee Red, are available on draught at the brewery's taproom and bars throughout Massachusetts and New Hampshire.

== The Brewery ==
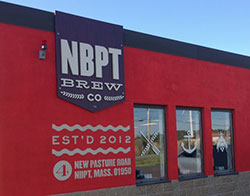
Newburyport Brewing Company Brewery Exterior in Newburyport

Newburyport Brewing Company hosts live music on Wednesday through Saturday nights in its taproom or beer garden, weather-depending. The brewery's founders play in a seven-piece funk band in Newburyport named Das Pintos.

The brewery has recently started hosting artist installations for several weeks. Recent exhibitions include Shane Taylor and Charley Saint Lewis.

== Staff ==
Brewmaster Mike Robinson's accolades include:

19-time medalist at the Masters Championship of Amateur Brewing | 2009 Sam Adams Longshot winner – chosen over 1,300 entrants | 2008 Sam Adams Longshot finalist | 3-time Sam Adams Patriot finalist | New England Home Brewer of the Year | 2015 United States Beer Tasting Competition Gold medals for Plum Island White, Kolsch, and Yankee Red Ale | 2015 Great International Beer & Cider Competition Gold medal for 1635 American Barley Wine.

== See also ==
- List of microbreweries
