= Harpoon Brewery =

American brewery

Coordinates: 42°20′46.69″N 71°02′03.46″W

- Industry: Alcoholic beverage
- Founded: 1986
- Founders: Dan Kenary; Rich Doyle; George Ligeti
- Headquarters: Boston, Massachusetts; United States
- Products: Beer, Cider, Seltzer
- Website: www.harpoonbrewery.com

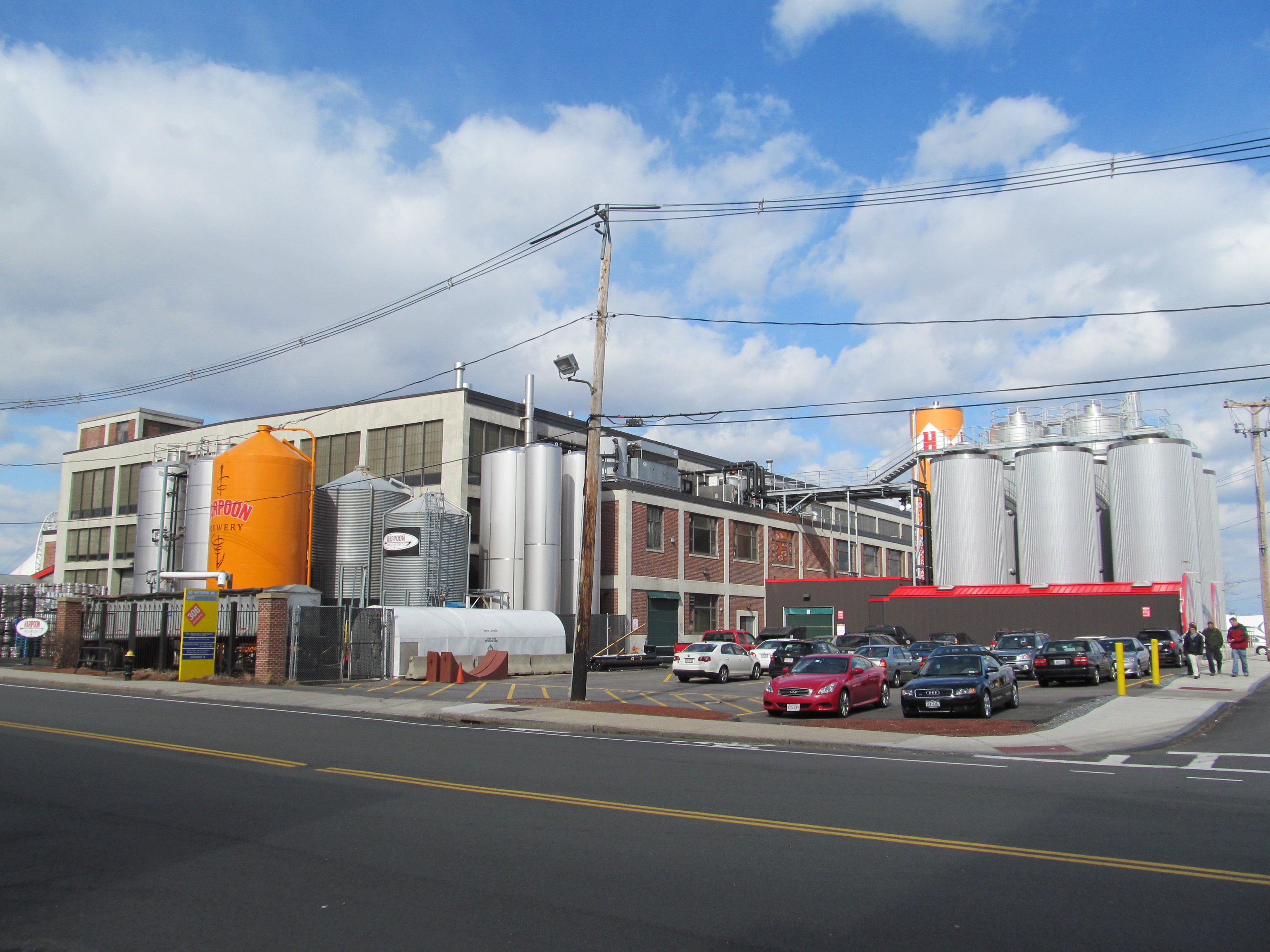
Harpoon Brewery in Boston

Harpoon Brewery is an American brewery, with locations in Boston, Massachusetts, and Windsor, Vermont.

== History ==
Harpoon Brewery, also known as Mass. Bay Brewing Company, Inc., was originally founded in 1986. The brewery was the first company to obtain a permit to manufacture and sell alcohol in the Commonwealth of Massachusetts in more than 15 years, and as a result laid claim to Massachusetts Brewing permit #001. Harpoon originally struggled to break even; the company reportedly first made a profit in 1992.

Harpoon was the first brewery in New England to brew an India Pale Ale. The beer was originally designed by Head Brewer (at the time) Tod Mott, in 1992 and first sold as a summer seasonal in 1993 and quickly became the brewery's flagship beer. Harpoon IPA quickly became a staple of the American India pale ale style and was found on tap at bars and restaurants in Greater Boston.

Locally, Harpoon is known for annual festivals that they hold at the brewery. In 1990, Harpoon threw the first Harpoon Octoberfest, which drew 2,000 people. Recent Harpoon Octoberfests have drawn more than 15,000 attendees. Harpoon also holds an annual St. Patrick's Day festival in early March and Harpoonfest in May.

In 2001, Harpoon started a five-mile road race known as the Harpoon 5-Miler. The race has reportedly raised more than $2.2 million for ALS research via The Angel Fund. In 2002, Harpoon launched the Harpoon Point-to-Point, a cycling race that raises money for the Vermont Foodbank. The race last raised more than $100,000.

Harpoon purchased the former Catamount Brewery plant in Windsor, Vermont, in 2000, expanding its brewing operations beyond Massachusetts.

In July 2014, while then the twelfth-largest craft brewery in the United States, the company became employee-owned via the creation of the Harpoon Employee Stock Ownership Plan. Harpoon's cofounder, Rich Doyle, along with other key investors, sold most of their shares in Harpoon and transferred them into an Employee Stock Ownership Plan.

In 2015, for the first time since its founding, Harpoon Brewery suspended production of its beer citing an imminent blizzard. Following the COVID-19 pandemic, the Brewery ran a campaign to fight food insecurity, donating money from beer purchases to the Vermont Foodbank and Greater Boston Food Bank.

In June 2022, Harpoon acquired the Long Trail Brewery of Bridgewater, Vermont. The deal involved Harpoon assuming possession of the Long Trail, Otter Creek and Shed brands.

In 2025, Harpoon Brewery expanded to its first location in New Hampshire.

== Products ==
Harpoon has seasonal beers, including an Octoberfest Marzen style Ale and Harpoon Camp Wannamango Another line of beers from Harpoon is its '100 Barrel Series', which consists of a number of one of a kind batches.

It brews multiple other year-round beers including the award-winning Dark, UFO Hefeweizen, UFO Raspberry Hefeweizen, UFO White, and Boston Irish Stout. It also brews several house beers at Boston bars, including "Sevens Ale" for the Sevens Ale House in Beacon Hill. Other offerings include Rec League, a New England Pale Ale, Big League, a big and juicy IPA, UFO Light Force, a light white, UFO Maine Blueberry, and selected Clown Shoes beers.

In 2017, Harpoon began collaborating with Cleveland's Great Lakes Brewing Company to package several varieties of Great Lakes Beer in cans.

In 2018, Harpoon teamed with Dunkin' Donuts to release Dunkin' Coffee Porter. They have released collaborative mix packs of beer with Dunkin’ Donuts every year since. In 2022, the company's flavors included Harpoon Dunkin’ Cold Brew Coffee Porter, Harpoon Dunkin’ Hazelnut Blonde Stout and Harpoon Dunkin’ Coffee Roll Cream Ale.

In 2022, Harpoon teamed up with the Boston Bruins hockey team to create a limited-edition beer called Hometown Hat Trick. The brewery also introduced a custom blood orange IPA in partnership with the Davio's restaurant in Boston's Seaport District. The same year, the company also introduced a non-alcoholic IPA called Open League, with 35 calories per serving.

Harpoon Brewery is also well known for their various pretzels made on site, which are made from leftover yeast of beer brewing. Harpoon used to produce several non-alcoholic sodas, including root beer, orange and cream, and cream soda, but ceased production in 2009. As of 2022, its homemade root beer is available on draft at its breweries.
