= List of breweries in Michigan =

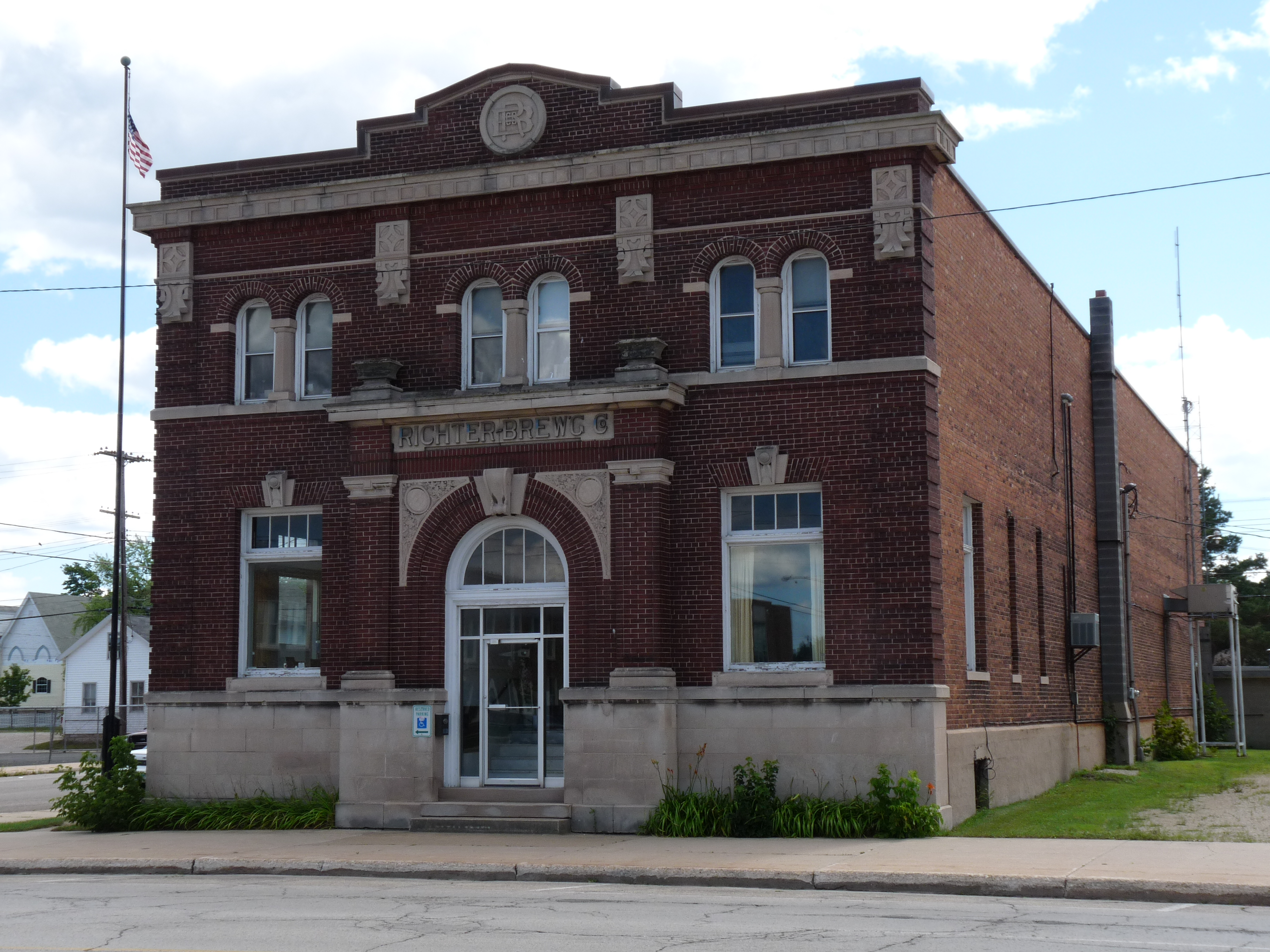
The Richter Brewery office building in Escanaba

Breweries in the Upper and Lower Peninsulas of Michigan produce a wide range of beers in different styles that are marketed locally, regionally, nationally, and internationally. In 2012 Michigan's 120 brewing establishments (including breweries, brewpubs, importers, and company-owned packagers and wholesalers) employed 595 people directly, and more than 36,000 others in related jobs such as wholesaling and retailing. Altogether, 140 people in Michigan had active brewer permits in 2012. Michigan beer marketing and coordination is generally handled by the Michigan Brewers Guild.

As of 2012, the total business and personal tax revenue generated by Michigan's breweries and related industries was more than $900 million (including people directly employed in brewing, as well as those who supply Michigan's breweries with everything from ingredients to machinery). Consumer purchases of Michigan's brewery products generated more than $290 million in tax revenue, and the state ranked 13th in the number of capita per craft brewery with 122 craft breweries, and 81,013 capita per craft brewery.

Brewing companies vary widely in the volume and variety of beer produced, from small nanobreweries and microbreweries to massive multinational conglomerate macrobreweries. For context, at the end of 2013 there were 2,822 breweries in the United States, including 2,768 craft breweries subdivided into 1,237 brewpubs, 1,412 microbreweries and 119 regional craft breweries. In that same year, according to the Beer Institute, the brewing industry employed around 43,000 Americans in brewing and distribution and had a combined economic impact of more than $246 billion.

== Breweries ==
=== Lower Peninsula ===
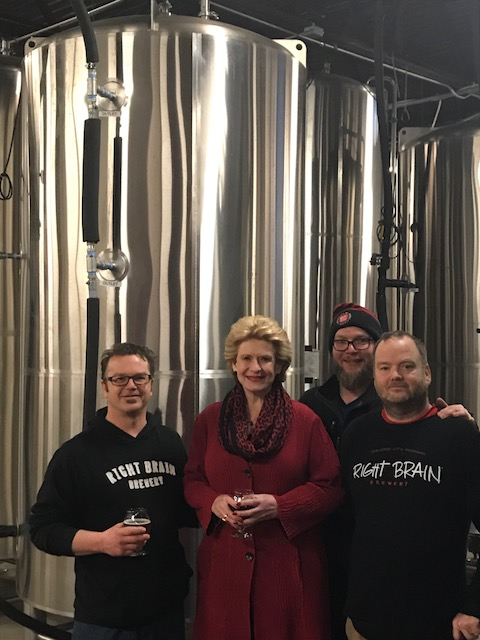
Right Brain Brewery owner and employees with Senator Debbie Stabenow

- 1 For All Brewery – Livonia
- 127 Brewing Company – Jackson
- 5 Lakes Brew Pub – Byron Center
- 734 Brewing Company – Ypsilanti
- Aberrant Ales – Howell
- Adesanya Mead & Microbrewery – Grandville
- Albion Malleable Brewing Company – Albion
- Alcona Brew Haus – Harrisville
- Alma Brewing Co – Alma
- Apoptosis Brewing Company – Kalamazoo
- Arbor Brewing Company – Ann Arbor, Ypsilanti, Plymouth
- Archival Brewing – Belmont
- Arvon Brewing Company – Grand Rapids
- Atwater Brewery – Detroit
- Austin Brothers Beer Company – Alpena
- B. Nektar – Ferndale
- BAD Brewing Company – Mason
- B.O.B.'s Brewery – Grand Rapids
- Baffin Brewing Company – Saint Clair Shores
- Barrister Brewing Company – Owosso
- Batch Brewing Company – Detroit
- Battle Alley Brewing Co. – Holly
- Bearded Lamb Brewing Company (Formerly Liberty Street Brewing Company) – Plymouth
- Beards Brewery – Petoskey
- Beer Church Brewing Company – New Buffalo
- Belching Monk Brewing - Shelby Township
- Bell's Brewery – Kalamazoo and Comstock
- Bier Distillery & Brewery – Comstock Park
- Bier's Inwood Brewery – Charlevoix
- Biercamp – Ann Arbor
- Bière de Mac Brew Works – Mackinaw City
- Big Buck Brewery – Gaylord
- Big Hart Brewing Company – Hart
- Big Lake Brewing – Holland
- Big Pines Brewing - Hillsdale
- Big T Restaurant – Lawton
- Bilbo's Pizza - Kalamazoo
- Black & Blue Brewery – Port Huron
- Blake's Orchard & Cider Mill – Armada
- Blind Island Brewery – Sturgis
- Block Brewing Company – Howell, Brighton
- Blue Skies Brewery – Jackson, Onsted
- Boathouse Beer Co. & Boozery – Tawas City
- Boss Cider – Leslie
- Bottom Creek - North Branch
- Brass Ring Brewing – Grand Rapids
- Brewery 4 Two 4 – Holland
- Brewery Becker – Brighton
- Brewery Outre – Kalamazoo
- Brewery Terra Firma – Traverse City
- Brick Haus Brews – Sparta
- BrickHaven Brewing Company – Grand Ledge
- Broad Leaf Brewery & Spirits – Kentwood
- Brown Iron Brewhouse – Washington Township, Royal Oak
- Burnt Marshmallow Brewstillery – Petoskey
- Burt Lake Brewery – Alanson
- Burzurk Brewing Co. – Grand Haven
- Cabin North Brewing Company - Detroit
- Cadillac Winery (LeRoy Brewing) – LeRoy
- Canton Brew Works – Canton
- Cassopolis Beer Company - Cassopolis
- Cedar Springs Brewing Company – Cedar Springs
- Cheboygan Brewing Company – Cheboygan
- Cherry Creek Cellars – Brooklyn
- Cherry Republic - Glen Arbor
- City Built Brewing Company – Grand Rapids
- CJ's Brewing Company – Commerce, Plymouth
- Clam Lake Beer Co – Cadillac
- Clock & Candle Brewatorium - Midland
- CONFLUXCITY Brewing Company – Portland
- Coopersville Brewing Co. – Coopersville
- Copper Hop Brewing Company – St. Clair Shores
- County Seat Brewing - Ionia
- Cranker's Restaurant and Brewery – Big Rapids
- Crazy Vines Winery - Sanford
- Dark Horse Brewery/ROAK Brewing/Brew Detroit – Marshall
- Dead Bear Brewing Co – Grayling
- Dearborn Brewing – Dearborn
- Detroit Beer Company – Detroit
- Dimes Brewhouse – Dimondale
- Dixie Saloon – Mackinaw City
- Dog and Pony Show Brewing – Oak Park
- Downey Brewing Company – Dearborn
- Drafting Table Brewing Company – Wixom
- Dragonmead – Warren
- EagleMonk Pub and Brewery – Lansing
- Earthen Ales – Traverse City
- Eastern Market Brewing - Detroit
- Eaton Pub & Grille & Charlotte Brewing Co. – Charlotte
- Elder Piper Beer + Cider – Petoskey
- Elk Street Brewery – Sandusky
- Ellison Brewery and Spirits – East Lansing
- Erratic Ale Co. – Dexter
- Farm Club – Traverse City
- Farmington Brewing Company – Farmington
- Fenton Winery & Brewery – Fenton
- Ferndale Project - Ferndale
- Fetch Brewing Co – Whitehall
- Fillmore 13 Brewery – Pontiac
- Final Gravity Brewing Company – Decatur
- Five Shores Brewing – Beulah
- Flat River Brewing Co. – Greenville
- Florian East Lagers & Ales - Hamtramck
- Founders Brewing Company – Grand Rapids
- Four Keys Brewing – Blissfield
- Four Labs Beer & Cider – Petoskey
- Four Leaf Brewing – Clare
- Frankenmuth Brewery – Frankenmuth
- Fulcra Brewing Company - Sawyer
- Full Measure Brewing Company - Detroit
- Ghost Isle Brewery – New Buffalo
- Glass Creek Winery/Brewery – Hastings
- Grand Armory Brewing Company – Grand Haven
- Grand River Brewery – Jackson
- Grand Traverse Brewing Company – Traverse City
- Gravel Bottom Craft Brewery – Ada
- Gravel Capital Brewing Company - Oxford
- Great Baraboo Brewing Company – Clinton Township
- Great Lakes Bay Distillery - Sterling
- Great Turtle Brewery & Distillery – Mackinac Island
- Great White Buffalo Brewing Co. – Northville
- Greyline Brewing Co. – Grand Rapids
- Griffin Claw Brewing Company - Birmingham, Rochester Hills
- Grizzly Peak Brewing Co. – Ann Arbor
- Gull Lake Distilling Company – Galesburg
- Handmap Brewing – Battle Creek
- Happy's Taco Shop – Boyne City
- Harbor Light Brewery – South Haven
- Harmony Brewing Company – Grand Rapids
- Harper's Restaurant & Brew Pub – East Lansing
- Hartland Brewing Co. – Howell
- Haymarket Brewery – Bridgman
- hear.say brewing + theater - Ann Arbor
- Heavenly Vineyards – Morley
- Heights Brewing – Farmington
- Heronmark – Allegan
- Hillsdale Brewing Company – Hillsdale
- Homegrown Brewing Company – Oxford
- HOMES Brewery – Ann Arbor
- Hop Hog Backyard Brewpub – Greenville, Lowell
- Hop Lot Brewing Co. – Suttons Bay
- HopSide Brewery – Alpena
- HUCO Brew Co. – Ubley
- Hunter's Ale House – Mount Pleasant
- Irish Kilt Brewing Company - Roscommon
- Ironbark Brewing Company – Jackson
- Jamesport Brewing Company – Ludington
- Jolly Pumpkin Artisan Ales – Dexter
- Journeyman Distillery (Sea of Monsters) - Three Oaks
- Kickstand Brewing Company – Commerce, New Hudson
- Kingsley Local Brewing – Kingsley
- Knaebe's Apple Farm & Ciderworks - Rogers City
- Kuhnhenn Brewing Company – Warren, Clinton Township
- Küsterer Brauhaus – Grand Rapids
- Lagerhaus No. 5 – Detroit
- Lake Ann Brewing Company – Lake Ann
- Lake Time Brewing and Spirits - Bridgman
- Lansing Brewing Company – Lansing
- Latitude 42 Brewing Company – Oshtemo, Portage
- Legendary Tales Brewhouse - Wakefield
- Lehman's Brewery & Farmhouse – Buchanan
- Leigh's Brewing Company - Holland
- Lily's Seafood Grill & Brewery – Royal Oak
- Linden Brewing Co. – Linden
- Loco Boys Brewing Company – Traverse City
- Loggers Brewing Company – Saginaw
- Looking Glass Brewing Co. – DeWitt
- Lost Art Brewhouse – Walker
- Ludington Bay Brewing Co. – Ludington
- Mackinac Island Brewery – Mackinaw City
- Mackinaw Trail Winery & Brewery – Petoskey
- Manchester Brewing Company - Manchester
- Mangata Beer Co. - Union Pier
- Meckley's Flavor Fruit Farm – Cement City
- Mi Element Grains and Grounds – Midland
- Michigan Brewing Works – Williamston
- MiddleCoast Brewing Company – Traverse City
- Midland Brewing Company – Midland
- Midtown Brewing Company – Lansing
- Mothfire Brewing Company – Ann Arbor
- Motor City Brewing Works – Detroit
- Mountain Town Brewing Company – Mount Pleasant
- New Holland Brewing Company – Holland, Grand Rapids, Battle Creek
- New Union Brewery – Lowell
- Newaygo Brewing Company – Newaygo
- Niles Brewing Company – Niles
- Noble Twist Taphouse - Saugatuck
- Nocturnal Bloom - Traverse City
- North Grove Brewers – Montague
- North Peak Brewing Company – Traverse City
- North Pier Brewing Company – Benton Harbor
- Northern Natural Cider House & Winery – Kaleva
- Northern Wind Brewing - Wyandotte
- Northland Brewing Co. – Indian River
- Northville Winery & Brewery – Northville
- Oakestown Brewery – Grandville
- Odd Side Ales – Grand Haven
- Off the Chain Brewstillery - Grand Haven
- Ogma Brewing Co. – Jackson
- Old Mill Brewpub & Grill – Plainwell
- Old Nation Brewing Co. – Williamston
- One Well Brewing – Kalamazoo
- OpenRoad Brewery – Wayland
- Oracle Brewing Co. – Saginaw
- Original Gravity Brewing Co. – Milan
- Our Brewing Company – Holland
- Ozone's Brewhouse – Lansing
- Paddle Hard Brewing – Grayling
- Panoramic Beverage Company - Saugatuck
- Parker's Hilltop Brewery – Clarkston
- Pavlov's Brewing Company – Temperance
- Paw Paw Brewing Co. – Paw Paw
- Perrin Brewing Company – Comstock Park
- Petoskey Brewing Company – Petoskey
- Pigeon Hill Brewing Company – Muskegon
- Pike 51 Brewery – Hudsonville
- Pink Barrel Cellars – Grand Rapids
- Pond Hill Farms – Harbor Springs
- Presidential Brewing Company – Portage
- Railtown Brewing Company – Caledonia
- Rake Beer Project – Muskegon
- Ramshackle Brewing Company – Jonesville
- Rare Bird Brewpub – Traverse City
- Redline Brewing Company – Burton
- Redwood Steakhouse and Brewery – Flint
- Reed City Brewing Company – Reed City
- Right Brain Brewery – Traverse City
- Rivers Edge Brewing Co. – Milford
- River Saint Joe – Buchanan
- River Trade Brewing Company – Constantine
- Roar Brewing Co. – Detroit
- Rochester Mills Beer Company – Rochester
- Rockford Brewing Company – Rockford
- Rolling Oak Brewing Co. – Grayling
- Room 94 Taps & Bourbon – Petoskey
- Round Barn – Union Pier, Baroda
- Rusted Spoke Brewing Co. – Mackinaw City
- Rustic Leaf Brewing Company – Waterford
- Rusty Rocket Brewing Company – Pullman
- Salt Springs Brewery – Saline
- SaltRock Brewing Co. – Lansing
- Sanctuary – Grand Ledge
- Sand Lake Micro Brewery and Winery - National City
- Sandhill Crane Vineyards – Jackson
- Saugatuck Brewing Company – Douglas
- Sawyers Brewing Company – Montague
- Schaendorf Brewing Company – Allegan
- Schmohz Brewing Co – Grand Rapids
- Schoolcraft Brewery – Livonia
- Seedz Brewry – Union Pier
- Sherwood Brewing Company – Shelby Township
- Short's Brewing Company – Bellaire
- Silver Harbor Brewing Company – St. Joseph
- Silver Spruce Brewing – Traverse City
- Sister Lakes Brewing Company – Dowagiac
- Six Spoke Brewing Company - Detroit
- Sleepwalker Spirts & Ale – Lansing
- Snowbelt Brewing Co. – Gaylord
- Someday Brewing – Grosse Pointe Woods
- South Haven Brewpub – South Haven
- Speciation Cellars – Grand Rapids
- Spicer's Winery - Fenton
- St. Ambrose Cellars – Beulah
- Starr Craft Brewery – Richmond
- Starving Artist Brewing – Ludington
- Steele Street Brewing – Ionia
- Stiggs Brewery & Kitchen – Boyne City
- Stone Hound Brewing Company – Williamsburg
- Stony Lake Brewing Co. – Saline
- Stormcloud Brewing Company – Frankfort
- Summerlands Brewing Company – Holt
- Supernatural Brewing and Spirits – Livonia
- Tantrick Brewing Co. – Allegan
- Tenacity Brewing Co. – Flint
- Territorial Brewing Company – Springfield
- Texas Corners Brewing Company – Kalamazoo
- The 707 Winery and Brewery – Caledonia
- The Distant Whistle Brewhouse – Vicksburg
- The Filling Station Microbrewery – Traverse City
- The Highway Brewing Co. – West Branch
- The Livery – Benton Harbor
- The Maple Grille Restaurant and Microbrewery - Hemlock
- The Mitten Brewing Company – Grand Rapids, Saugatuck, Northport
- The Royal Oak Brewery – Royal Oak
- The Strand Brewery & Kitchen – Dowagiac
- The Winery North of 12 – Brooklyn
- The Workshop Brewing Company – Traverse City
- Third Nature Brewing Company – Manistee
- Thornapple Brewing Company – Grand Rapids
- Three Blondes Brewing Company – South Haven
- Three Bridges Distillery & Taproom – Midland
- Thumb Brewery – Caseville
- Tilted Axis Brewing Company – Lapeer
- Tombstone Brewery LLC - Chesterfield
- Trail Point Brewing Company - Allendale
- Transient Artisan Ales – Bridgman
- Tri-City Brewing Company – Bay City
- Trippelroot Brewery – Zeeland
- TwoGuys Brewing – Wyoming
- Unexpected Craft Brewing Company – Oak Park
- Unruly Brewing Company – Muskegon
- Urbanrest Brewing Company – Ferndale
- Useless Creatures Brewing Company – Three Rivers
- Vander Mill – Grand Rapids
- Venture Brewing - Monroe
- Vineyard 2121 - Benton Harbor
- Vivant Brewery + Spirits – Grand Rapids
- Voodoo Brewing - Canton
- W.H. Ales – Bay City
- War Water Brewery – St. Clair
- Walldorff Brew Pub & Bistro – Hastings
- Warner Vineyards – Paw Paw
- Watermark Brewing Company – Stevensville
- WaterStreet Winery & Brewing Company – Marine City
- Wax Wings Brewing Company – Kalamazoo
- Whiskey Point Brewing Company – Beaver Island
- White Flame Brewing Co. – Hudsonville
- Whole Hearted Winery – New Hudson
- Witch's Hat Brewing Company – South Lyon
- Wyandotte Beer Company – Wyandotte
- Ypsi Alehouse – Yspilanti

=== Upper Peninsula ===
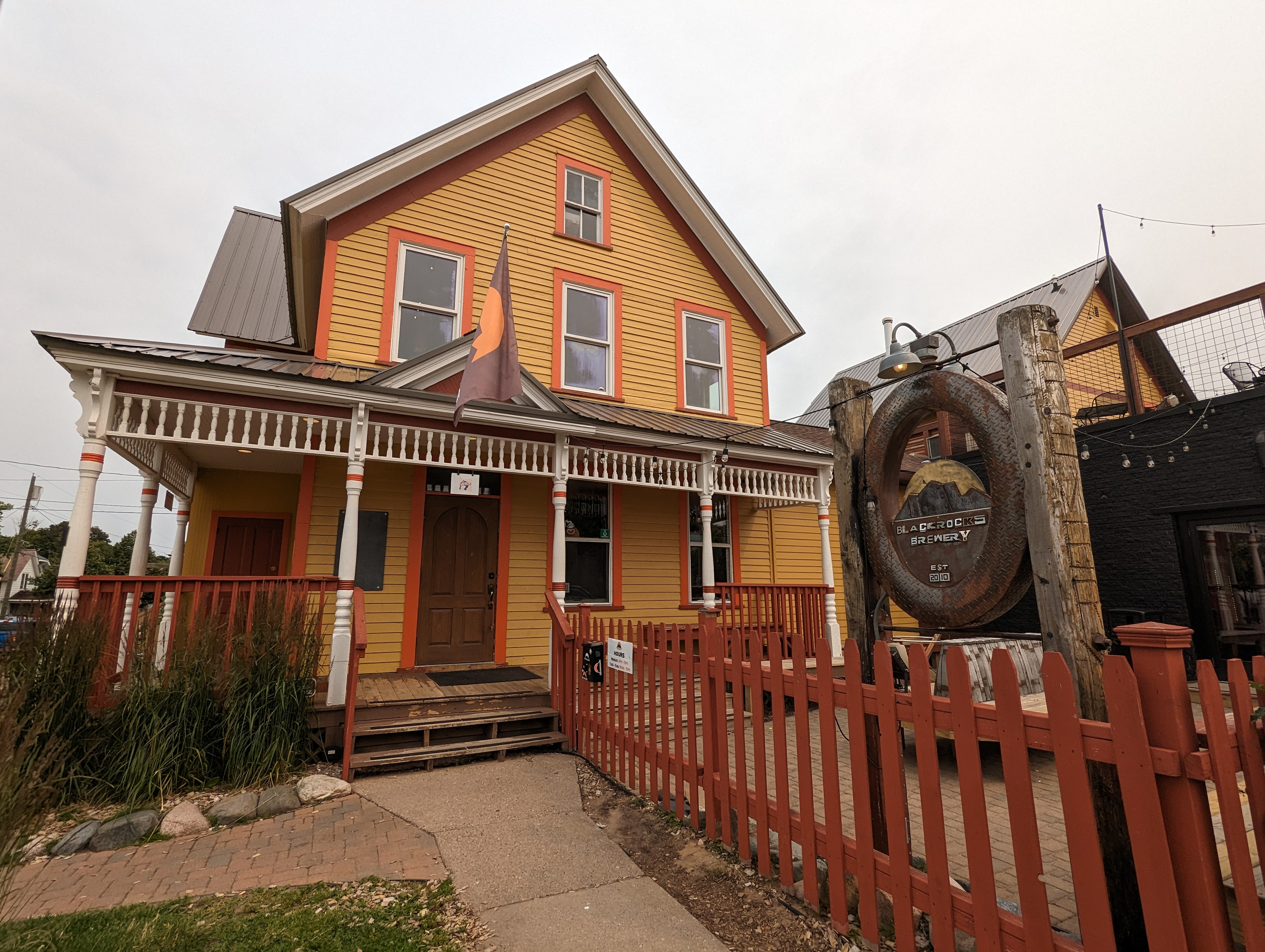
Blackrocks Brewery in Marquette, Michigan

- 51st State Brewing Company – Kingsford
- Alpha Michigan Brewing Company – Alpha
- Blackrocks Brewery – Marquette
- ByGeorge Brewing Company - Munising
- Cold Iron Brewing - Ironwood
- Drifa Brewing Company – Marquette
- East Channel Brewing Company - Munising
- Flatiron Brewing – Manistique
- Jasper Ridge Brewery - Ishpeming
- Keweenaw Brewing Company – Houghton
- Kognisjon Bryggeri (Formerly Cognition Brewing Company) - Marquette
- Lake Superior Smokehouse Brewpub – Harvey
- LaTulip Brewing Company – Cooks
- Les Cheneaux Distillers – Cedarville
- Mackinaw Trail Winery & Brewery – Manistique
- Marquette Harbor Brewing - Marquette
- Ore Dock Brewing Company – Marquette
- Red Jacket Brewing Company - Calumet
- Salty Mac Brewing Company - St. Ignace
- Saunders Point Brewing Company - Gladstone
- Soo Brewing Company - Sault Ste. Marie
- Superior Culture – Marquette
- Tahquamenon Falls Brewery and Pub - Newberry
- The Church Brewery - Bark River
- The Dunes Saloon Lake Superior Brewing Co. – Grand Marais
- The Library – Houghton
- Three Bridge Brewing Company – Menominee
- Upper Hand Brewery – Escanaba
- Upper Peninsula Brewing Company – Negaunee

== Closed breweries ==
- 3 Gatos Brewery – Wyoming
- 3 North Lexington – Lexington
- Alebird Taphouse and Brewery (Open But No Longer Brewing) – Byron Center
- Altes Brewing Company (1898–1919; 1933–1967) – Detroit
- Arcadia Brewing Company – Kalamazoo
- Arclight Brewing Company – Watervliet
- Arctic Circle Brewing Company – New Baltimore
- Ascension Brewing Company – Novi
- Artisan Reserve, Inc. – Romulus
- Auto City Brewing Company (1911–1919; 1933–1942) – Detroit
- Axle Brewing – Ferndale, Michigan
- Barn Brewers Brewery – Lawton
- Barrel + Beam - Marquette
- Big Cat Brewing Company – Cedar
- Black Fire Winery – Tecumseh
- Blue Tractor BBQ & Brewery – Ann Arbor
- Brewery Faisan – Detroit
- Brewery Nyx – Grand Rapids
- Brickside Brewery - Copper Harbor
- Brite Eyes Brewing Company – Kalamazoo
- Cadillac Straits Brewing Company – Madison Heights
- Cellar Brewing Company – Sparta
- Chelsea Alehouse Brewery – Chelsea
- Constantine Brewing Company – Constantine
- Creston Brewery – Grand Rapids
- DeHop's Brewing Company – Walker
- Depot No. 36 at Kayla Rae Cellars – Rockford
- Detroit Brewing Company (1868–1919; 1933–1949) – Detroit
- Draught Horse Brewery – New Hudson
- Dutch Girl Brewery – Spring Lake
- E & B Brewing Company (1877–1919; 1935–1962) – Detroit
- East West Brewing – Grand Rapids
- Elk Brewing Company – Grand Rapids, Comstock Park
- Eternity Brewing Company – Howell
- Falling Down Beer Company – Warren, Oxford
- Five Sons Brewing – Marenisco
- Four Circles Brewery – Brighton
- Fresh Coast Beer Works – Traverse City
- From Huron Out Pub – Oscoda
- Goebel Brewing Company (1873–1919; 1934–1964) – Detroit
- Grand Rapids Brewing Company – Grand Rapids
- Grand Valley Brewing Company – Ionia
- Greenbush Brewing Company (2011–2026) – Sawyer
- Guardian Brewing Company – Saugatuck
- Hereford & Hops Steak House And Brewpub – Escanaba
- The Hideout Brewing Company – Grand Rapids
- Hopland Brewstillery – Holland
- Identity Brewing Company – Traverse City
- Innovators Brewing Co. – Richville
- Jaden James Brewery – Kentwood
- Jamex Brewing Company – St. Clair Shores
- Kitzingen Brewery – Wyoming
- Koppitz-Melchers Brewery (1891–1919; 1934–1947) – Detroit
- Liquid Note - Otsego
- Loaded Dice Brewery – Troy
- Longship Brewing Company – Lawton
- Lumber Barons Brewery – Bay City
- Macatawa Ales – Holland
- Michigan Brewing Company – Webberville
- MichiGrain Distillery – Lansing
- Murray Street Brewing Company – Mattawan
- Nain Rouge Brewery – Detroit
- North Center Brewing Company – Northville
- North Channel Brewing Co. (Open but no longer brewing) – Manistee
- Old Boys Brewhouse – Spring Lake
- One Drop Brewing Company – Oxford
- Osgood Brewing Company – Grandville
- Pfeiffer Brewing Company (1889–1919; 1934–1966) – Detroit
- Raven Brewing & BBQ – Big Rapids
- Rebuy Brewing Company (Formerly Brooks Brewing) – Shelby Township
- Richter Brewery – Escanaba
- Salty Pecker Brewing Company – Muskegon
- Schmidt Brewing Company (1872–1951) – Detroit
- Sebewaing Brewing Company – Sebewaing, Michigan which was briefly known as "The Michigan Brewing Company.
- St. Johns Brewing Co. – St. Johns
- Stroh Brewery Company (1850–2000) – Detroit
- Stumblebum Beer Co. – Troy
- Sustainable Brewing at Kalamazoo Valley Community College - Kalamazoo
- Tecumseh Brewing Company – Tecumseh
- Third Monk Brewing Company – South Lyon
- Townies Brewery – Ann Arbor
- Tulip City Brewstillery – Holland
- Two Bandits Brewing Co. – Coldwater
- Unity Vibration – Ypsilanti
- Upper Peninsula Brewing Company – Marquette
- Waypost Brewing Co. – Fennville
- Wolverine State Brewing Co. – Ann Arbor
- Zynda Brewing Company (1877–1948) – Detroit

== See also ==
- Beer in the United States
- List of breweries in the United States
- List of microbreweries
