= Avery Brewing Company =

Brewery in Boulder, Colorado

- Industry: Alcoholic beverage
- Founded: 1993
- Founder: Adam Avery
- Headquarters: Boulder, Colorado, United States
- Products: Beer
- Parent: Mahou-San Miguel Group
- Website: http://averybrewing.com/

Avery Brewing Company is a regional brewery located in Boulder, Colorado, founded in 1993. The brewery produces year round beers as well as seasonal beers, some of which have received praise from brewing competitions and festivals such as White Rascal Belgian-Style White Ale at the 2015 Great American Beer Festival. In 2017, Spain-based Mahou-San Miguel Group acquired a 30% stake in Avery. In 2019, Avery sold another 40% stake to Mahou-San Miguel Group and Founders Brewing Company.

== History ==
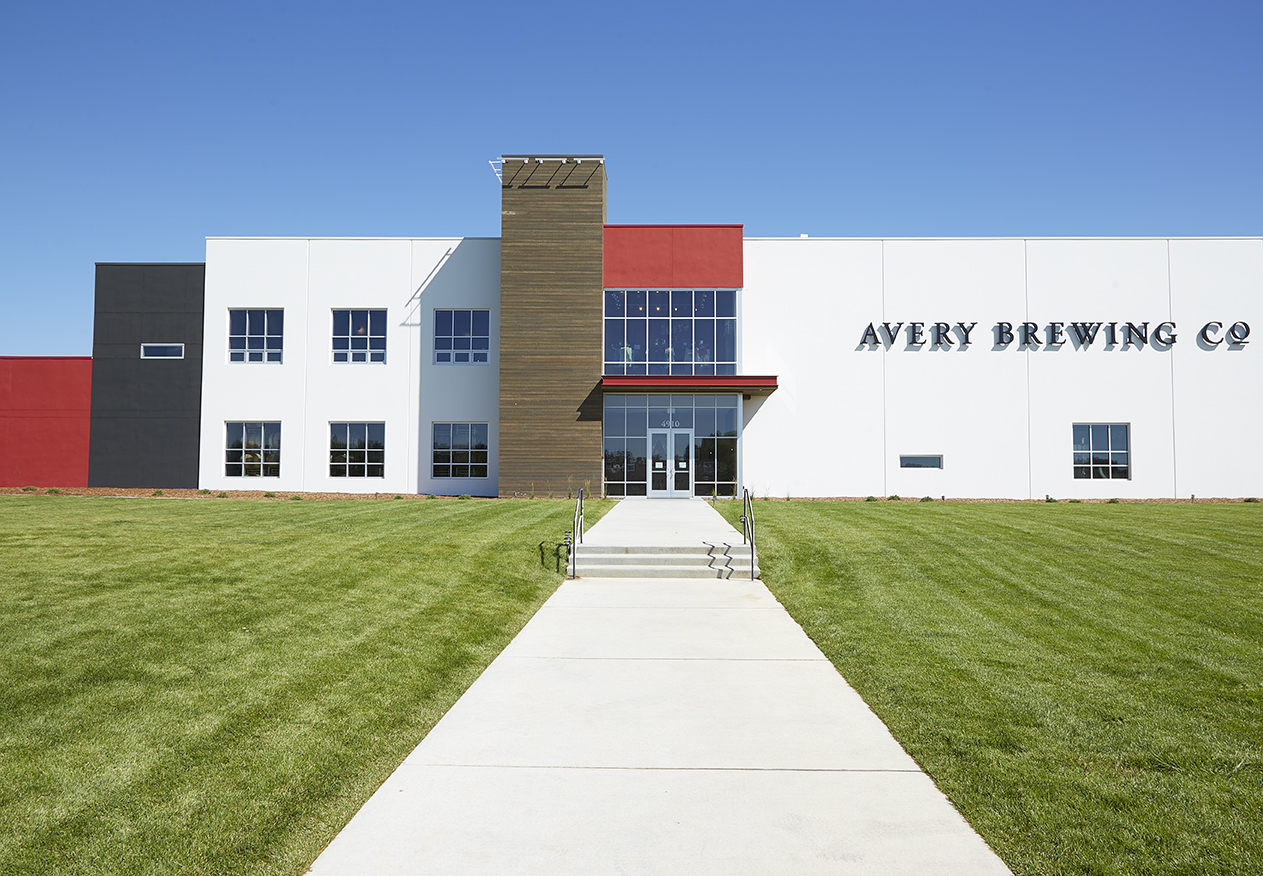
Avery Brewing Company's new brewery opened in February 2015 in Boulder, Colorado.

Adam Avery, president and head brewmaster of the brewery, incorporated the company in 1993 when craft breweries were just starting to increase in popularity among mainstream beer drinkers. In its first years, the brewery utilized only a seven barrel tank to ferment its beers, causing production to be relatively small. In the years since, the brewery has expanded and produced 50,000 barrels of beer in 2015. This volume of beer has allowed Avery beers to become increasingly available throughout Colorado, and the rest of the United States as well. As a result of capacity constraints, Avery Brewing left 18 markets in the United States in 2010 and 2011. Once the new Nautilus Court facility in Boulder went online, Avery began to re-enter those markets as of 2015 and 2016. In 2015, the brewery closed the doors of its original brewery and opened their new $30 million, 67,000 sq. ft. brewery, nearly doubling their brewing capacity and providing space for a potential expansion to 500,000 barrels per year.

In November 2017, Avery announced that Mahou-San Miguel had purchased a 30% minority stake in the business. This makes Avery no longer a craft brewery, since the Brewers Association requires that craft breweries not be more than 25% owned by a macro-brewery.

== Beer ==
Since the brewery's founding in 1993, Avery has vastly increased the number and varieties of its beers for the growing market of craft beer drinkers. Avery's beers vary greatly in style from Avery IPA to White Rascal Belgian-Style White Ale to Raspberry Sour to Rumpkin, a 15-18% ABV spiced pumpkin beer aged in rum barrels.

=== Core Beers ===
- India Pale Ale - Citrusy and floral IPA with a crisp finish. ABV=6.5% IBU=69. Beer Advocate Rating=87
- White Rascal Belgian-Style White Ale - Traditional unfiltered Belgian wheat brewed with orange peel and coriander. ABV=5.6% IBU=20. Beer Advocate Rating=83
- Ellie's Brown Ale - Malty, chocolaty, nutty. ABV=5.5% IBU=28. Beer Advocate Rating=87
- Out of Bounds Stout - Roasty full-bodied stout with a dry finish. ABV=6.3% IBU=51. Beer Advocate Rating=85
- Joe's Pils - Sessionable, hoppy, and crisp. ABV=4.7% IBU=50. Beer Advocate Rating=84
- Liliko'i Kepolo - Belgian-style white ale with passionfruit. ABV=5.4% IBU=20. Beer Advocate Rating=91
- Raja Double IPA - Tropical and dank double India Pale Ale. ABV=8% IBU=90. Beer Advocate Rating=92

=== Holy Trinity of Ales ===
- Hog Heaven Imperial Red IPA - Dank, malty, full-bodied with dry hops. ABV=9.2% IBU=104. Beer Advocate Rating=89
- The Reverend Belgian-Style Quadrupel Ale - Fruity esters with hints of dark cherry, currants and molasses. ABV=10% IBU=24. Beer Advocate Rating=86
- Salvation Belgian-Style Golden Ale - Effervescent with notes of apricot, peach, and clove. ABV=9% IBU=33. Beer Advocate Rating=86

=== Botanicals & Barrels Series ===
- Raspberry Sour - Notes of oak and lactic acidity with tart, red raspberries. ABV=6-7% IBU=8. Beer Advocate Rating=91
- Vanilla Bean Stout - Notes of chocolate, caramel, and molasses. ABV=8.5-9.5% IBU=29. Beer Advocate Rating=91

=== Seasonal Selections ===
- Old Jubilation Ale - Winter seasonal. ABV=8.3% IBU=45. Beer Advocate Rating=87
- Perzik Saison - Dry and crisp summer seasonal brewed with peaches. ABV=6.4% IBU=20. Beer Advocate Rating=83

=== Dictator Series ===
- The Maharaja Imperial IPA - Pungent hops with notes of grapefruit. ABV=10-11% IBU=102. Beer Advocate Rating=94
- The Kaiser Imperial Oktoberfest - Massive, malty Oktoberfest. ABV=9-10% IBU=24. Beer Advocate Rating=86
- The Czar Russian Imperial Stout - Notes of caramel, toffee, and mocha. ABV=10-12% IBU=55. Beer Advocate Rating=88

=== The Demons of Ale ===
- Samael's Oak Aged Ale - Like a port with notes of caramel, vanilla, toffee, and oak. ABV=15-18% IBU=41. Beer Advocate Rating=87
- The Beast Grand Cru - Like a Caribbean rum with notes of dates, plums, and raisins. ABV=15-18% IBU=68. Beer Advocate Rating=86
- Mephistopheles' Stout - Velvety, complex stout. ABV=15-18% IBU=80. Beer Advocate Rating=92

=== Annual Barrel Series ===
- Uncle Jacob's Stout - Robust, silky smooth, and aged in fresh Bourbon barrels. ABV=15-18% Beer Advocate Rating=97
- Rumpkin - Rum barrel-aged pumpkin ale. ABV=15-18% Beer Advocate Rating=89
- Tweak - Bourbon barrel-aged coffee stout. ABV=13-18% Beer Advocate Rating=97
- Pump[KY]n - Bourbon barrel-aged pumpkin porter. ABV=15-18% Beer Advocate Rating=91

=== Barrel-Aged Series ===
Avery Brewing's barrel-aging program has released 49 one-off sour, wild, and barrel-aged strong beers.
