= Delta Hotel =

- U.S. National Register of Historic Places
- U.S. Historic district – Contributing property
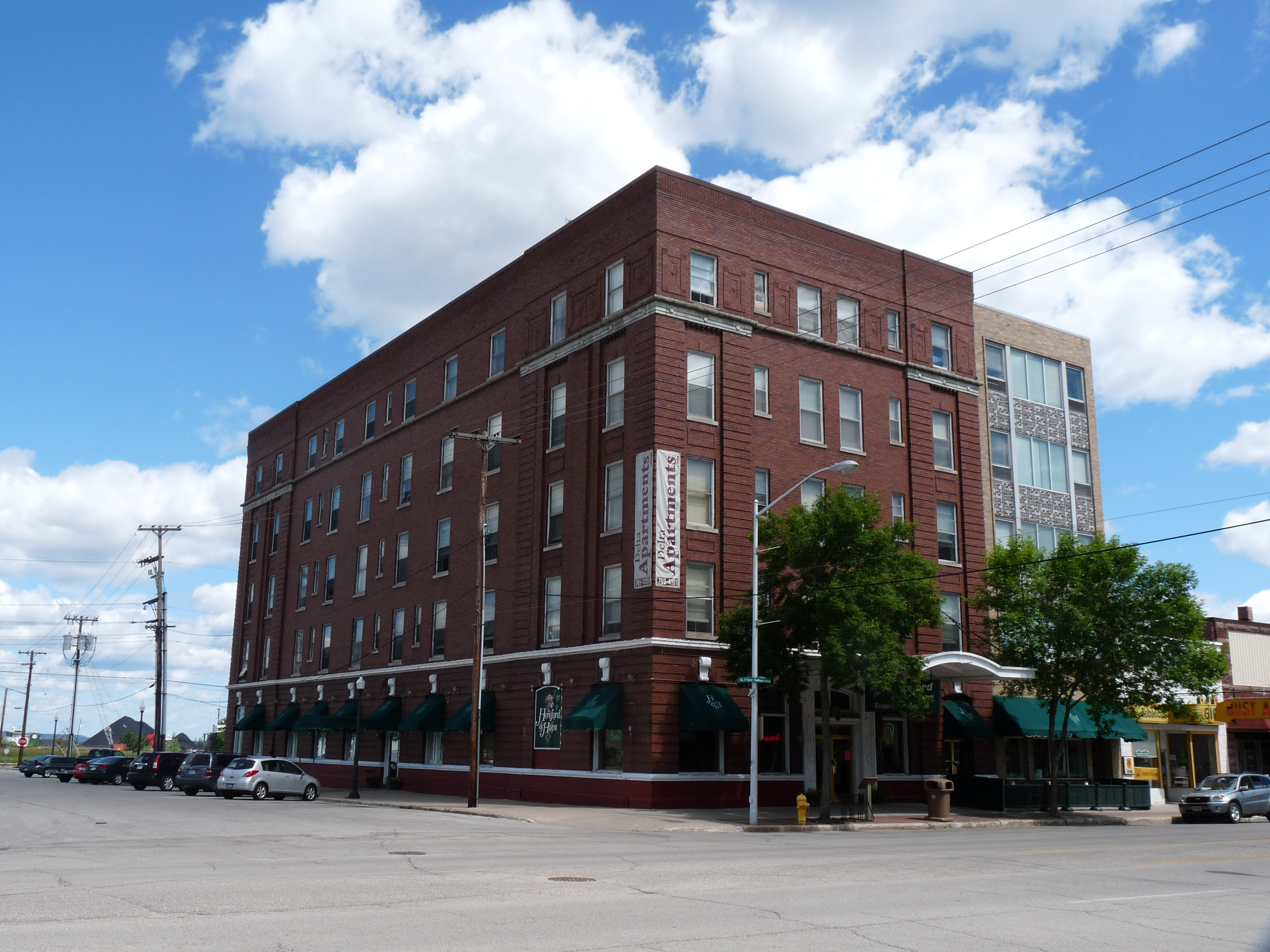

- Location within Michigan Location within the United States
- Interactive map
- Location: 624 Ludington St., Escanaba, Michigan
- Coordinates: 45°44′46″N 87°3′22″W
- Area: less than one acre
- Built: 1912
- Architectural style: Classical Revival
- Part of: Escanaba Central Historic District (ID14000123)
- NRHP reference No.: 98000350
- Added to NRHP: April 9, 1998

The Delta Hotel, also known as the Bishop Noa Home for Senior Citizens, Hereford and Hops Restaurant and Brewpub, and the Delta Apartments, is a hotel located at 624 Ludington Street in Escanaba, Michigan, United States. It was listed on the National Register of Historic Places in 1998.

== History ==
In the early 1900s, Escanaba experienced an economic boom due to its central location in the Upper Peninsula of Michigan, which created a natural transportation hub moving iron ore from railroad cars onto ships. In fact, the city's population grew from 9,500 in 1900 to 14,500 in 1913. At about that time, a stockholder's corporation, supported in part by local businessmen, formed to construct a new hotel in the city. The Delta Hotel opened on January, 1914, and served as Escanaba's best hotel for many years. In 1922 the hotel was sold to Clyde J. Burns, an Escanaba businessman and politician. Burns and his wife managed the hotel until 1957, when Burns' widow sold it to her nephew, David W. Walch.

In 1962, the hotel closed, and Walch sold it to the Roman Catholic Diocese of Marquette. The hotel was converted into a nursing home, known as the Bishop Noa Home for Senior Citizens, in 1962-63, at which time an addition was constructed. The Bishop Noa Home moved from the building in 1992. The building remained vacant for a short period, and was then purchased and renovated. In 1994, the Hereford and Hops, a brewpub and restaurant, opened in first floor the building. The upper floors were converted into thirty-two apartments. As of 2018, the Hereford and Hops still occupied the building.

== Description ==
The Delta Hotel is a five-story, 66 feet (20 m) high Classical Revival structure. The main facades have a rusticated exterior at the first floor level, and a decorative belt resembling a cornice below the fifth-floor windows. There is paneled brickwork between the windows on the fifth floor level, and a parapet across the top that was added when the original main cornice was removed. It originally had 75 hotel rooms, and now has 32 apartments.

The 1962–63 addition is a sand-colored, brick, C-shaped structure, measuring 25 feet (7.6 m) by 140 feet (43 m).

== See also ==
- National Register of Historic Places listings in Delta County, Michigan
