= Jolly Pumpkin Artisan Ales =

Business owning breweries in Michigan

Jolly LLC
- Industry: Alcoholic beverage
- Founded: 2004; 22 years ago
- Headquarters: 2319 E Bishop Circle Dexter, Michigan, USA
- Products: Beer
- Owner: Ron Jeffries
- Parent: Northern United Brewing Company
- Website: jollypumpkin.com

Jolly Pumpkin Artisan Ales is a brewery in Dexter, Michigan founded by Ron and Laurie Jeffries in 2004. Jolly Pumpkin produces unfiltered and unpasteurized beers.

== Production ==
Jolly Pumpkin beers are aged in oak, including wine barrels, former bourbon barrels and large foudres. The wood contains naturally occurring microbiological cultures including brettanomyces. These cultures impart a flavor profile in the beers described as leathery, earthy, wild and funky. This style of beer has been described as farmhouse ale or American wild ale. The Jolly Pumpkin beer is aged anywhere from 4 weeks up to 2 years or more.

== Reception ==
Their Oro de Calabaza won the 2004 Gold and the 2005 Bronze Medal in the Belgian- and French-style ale category at the Great American Beer Festival. Their Bam Bière won the Bronze Medal in the 2009 Great American Beer Festival and was named the 21st best beer in America by Men's Journal.

== Products ==
=== Year-round beers ===
Year-round beers include:

- Oro de Calabaza ("Pumpkin gold") (8% abv), described as a Franco-Belgian-style strong golden ale.
- La Roja (7.2% abv), a Flanders red ale.
- Bam Bière (4.5% abv), described as a light farmhouse ale or saison.
- Blanca (4.8% abv), low calories farmhouse witbier.

=== Special releases ===
Their occasionally available Grand Reserve beers include:

- La Roja Krieked: A version of this beer aged with cherries was offered at the 2008 Michigan Brewers Guild Festival.
- Madrugada Obscura Grand Reserve: This was barrel-aged for 18 months. It was offered only on draft at the First Annual Stone Sour Fest in July 2007 and was a special tap at the 2008 Michigan Brewers Guild Festival.
- Perseguidor ("Pursuer"): A limited-release, custom-blended ale which is oak-aged an additional six months before release. There have been five releases.
  - Batch 1 (7.2% abv): A blend of Bam Biere and La Roja This batch was offered at the 2006 Michigan Brewers Guild Festival and released during the fall of 2006.
  - Batch 2 (8% abv): Also known as "Oro de Calabaza Reserve," this batch was a blend of Oro de Calabaza and Bam Biere. This batch was only offered on draft at the First Annual Stone Sour Fest in July 2007.
  - Batch 3 (abv unknown): This was offered at the 2008 Michigan Brewers Guild Festival and released in 750 mL Bottles in early August 2008.
  - Batch 4: released January 2009. A blend of 3-year-old La Roja, 3-year-old Madrugada Obscura and 1-year-old Noel de Calabaza. Conditioned for 6 months in 12-ounce bottles.
  - Batch 5: released January 17, 2010. A blend of La Roja Grand Reserve, Luciernaga Grand Reserve, and Bam Biere Grand Reserve. Blend was aged on oak for 6 months and then bottle-conditioned for 6 months. 480 bottles were produced.

== See also ==
- Barrel-aged beer
