= Escanaba Central Historic District =

Historic district in Michigan, United States

- U.S. National Register of Historic Places
- U.S. Historic district
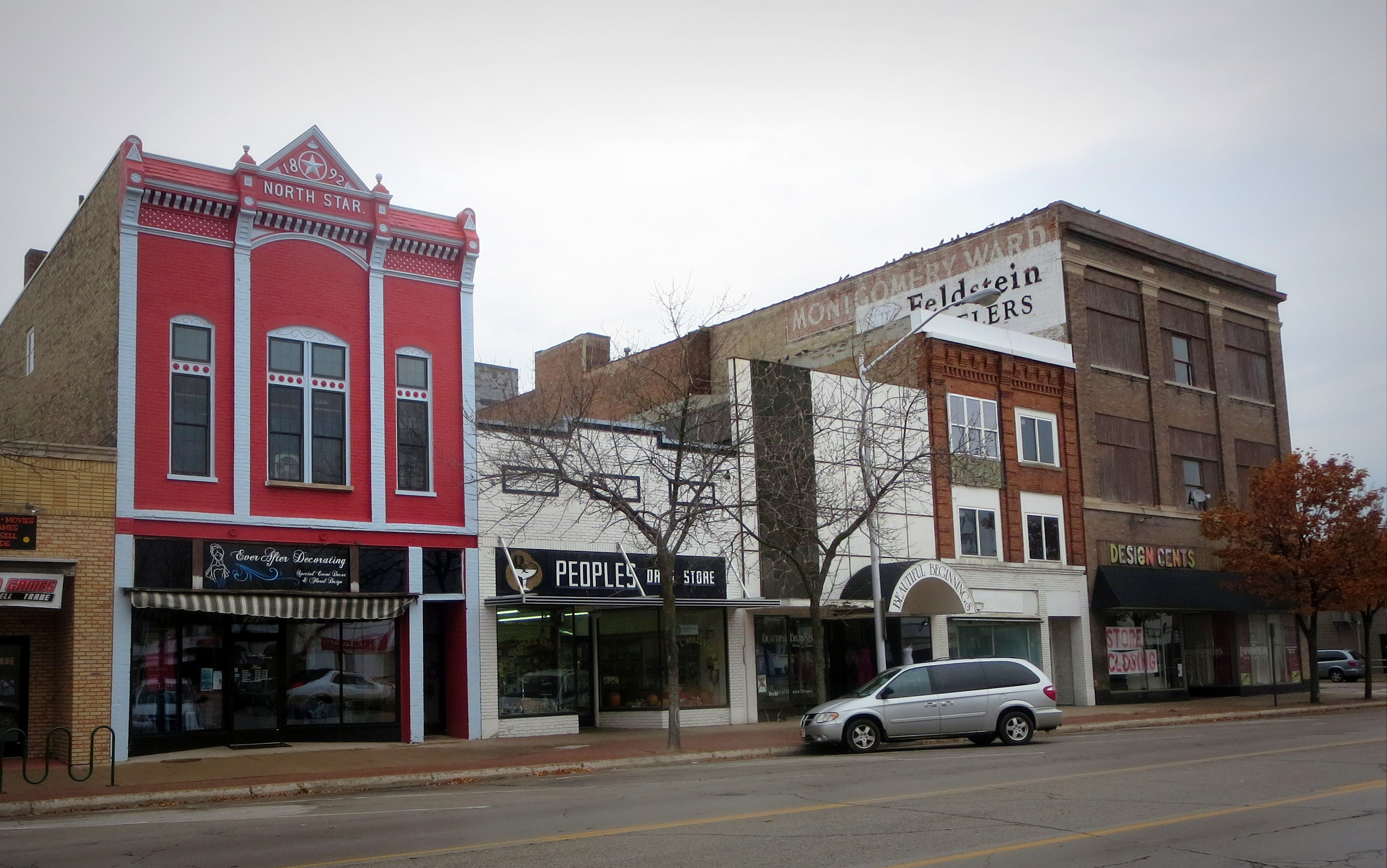
- 1200 Block of Ludington Street

- Location within Michigan Location within the United States
- Interactive map
- Location: Roughly 200-1800 blocks Ludington St., Escanaba, Michigan
- Coordinates: 45°44′45″N 87°3′41″W
- Architectural style: Romanesque, Late Victorian, Modernist
- NRHP reference No.: 14000123
- Added to NRHP: April 7, 2014

The Escanaba Central Historic District is a commercial historic district located along Ludington Street in Escanaba, Michigan, generally encompassing the 200-1800 blocks. The district was listed on the National Register of Historic Places in 2014.

== History ==
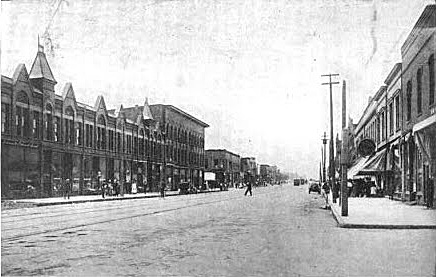
1100 block of Ludington Avenue, Escanaba c 1911

When Escanaba was first platted in 1864, it was anticipated that First Avenue would be the city's primary thoroughfare. However, as the city grew, Ludington quickly became the primary commercial district, and businesses built along this street. The initial placement of buildings was scattered around the eastern end of Ludington, but by 1884 the blocks from 2nd through 7th streets were densely populated. By 1894, the densely developed portion of the commercial district generally extended through 8th Avenue, but scattered commercial frame buildings existed in blocks further west up to 14th Street. Most of this western section, though, was residential. By 1906, commercial buildings were infilling lots through to 13th Street. By this time, industrial and manufacturing companies were moving into the 1700 block, with Richter Brewing Co., the Escanaba Electric Street Railway, and sleigh manufacturer R. P. Linn Company in existence. By the 1920s, services stations, auto dealerships, and other automotive related businesses appeared along Ludington.

== Description ==
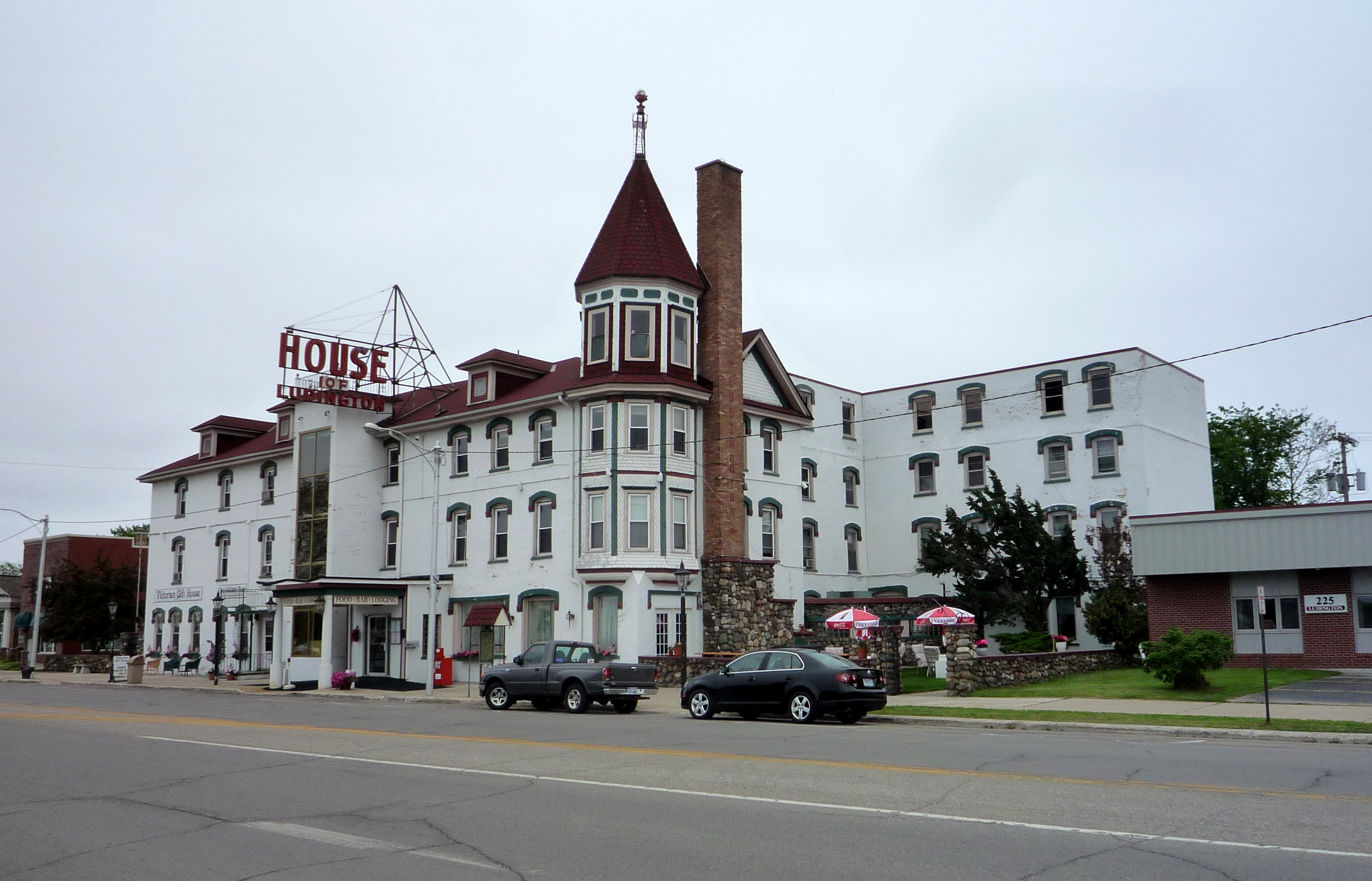
Former House of Ludington (200 block of Ludington) in 2009

The Escanaba Central Historic District is located at the center of the current city of Escanaba, and runs for over a mile along Ludington Street from former location of Nelson Ludington's House of Ludington, destroyed by fire 2025, in the 200 block on the eastern end to the former Stegath Lumber Company located at the intersection of South 19th Street. The buildings in the district are mostly two stories in height, and date primarily from the early 1880s to the mid-1960s. The distribution of building ages echoes the development of the city, and generally progresses from east to west, running from the House of Ludington, portions of which may date to the 1860s, to the small commercial buildings in the 1600 block which date to the beginning of the 20th century. Landmark buildings in the district include the 1902-03 Carnegie Public Library, the 1914 Delta Hotel, and the 1900 Richter Brewery, all of which are individually listed on the National Register. IN addition, the district includes the 1902 City Hall, the 1931-32 Escanaba Junior High School, and the 1938-1939 St. Joseph's Catholic Church and Gymnasium/Bonifas Auditorium. The district also includes Neoclassical bank buildings, Late Victorian commercial blocks, and Period Revival and Moderne movie theaters, and later representatives of International and Mid-Century Modern influences.

=== 200 block ===
The 200 block of Ludington at the eastern end of the district included the former three-story House of Ludington hotel, constructed in the nineteenth century. The House of Ludington may be the oldest operating hotel in the Upper Peninsula until its destruction in 2025, with some portions dating back as far as 1864. Also in this block are the Modernist Chamber of Commerce Visitor Center.

=== 300 block ===
The 300 block of Ludington includes the two-story yellow brick and masonry Delta County Building, also a Modernist structure, and the red brick Escanaba State Office Building located across the street.

=== 400 block ===
The 400 block of Ludington includes a Late Victorian commercial structure at 413 Ludington, constructed in 1887. The block also includes the Escanaba City Hall and Library building, constructed in 1994, but this structure is excluded from the historic district.

=== 500 block ===
The 500 block of Ludington includes the Harbor Tower apartment building, the second tallest structure in the Upper Peninsula. The block also includes a 1910 Neoclassical building which was formerly the post office, and the Elks Hall building, which was renovated in 1925 to exhibit Mission-style architectural characteristics.

=== 600 block ===
The 600 block of Ludington includes the Daley Block and the Masonic Block, both constructed around 1890, the Michigan Building, built in the mid-1890s, and the Rathfonllst National Bank Building, built 1903. These structures are fine examples of red Lake Superior sandstone Romanesque architecture. The block also includes the Delta Hotel.

=== 700 block ===
The 700 block of Ludington includes more examples of fine two-story commercial construction, including red Lake Superior sandstone work in the 1914 Erickson Dry Goods store building. The block also includes the 1917 Escanaba National Bank. The district stretches along 7th street to include the 1902 Carnegie Public Library and the nearby 1939 St. Joseph's Church and the associated 1938 William Boniface Auditorium.

=== 800 block ===
The 800 block of Ludington consists primarily of two-story Commercial Brick buildings, dating from the 1920s and 1930s. The block also includes the 1935 Streamline Moderne Michigan Theater, and the distinctive Swanson's Service Station, dating from the early 1930s.

=== 900 block ===
The 900 block of Ludington also consists primarily of two-story Commercial Brick buildings, but also includes the 1914 Flemish Revival Delft Theater, whose style is echoed in the nearby Arcade Recreation Parlor Building and c. 1920 Bonefeld Furniture Building.

=== 1000 block ===
The 1000 block of Ludington consists of a series of early twentieth-century commercial buildings, including two former theater buildings. These are the c. 1896 four-story Fair Savings Bank Store/Ben's Theater (renovated in the early 20th century) and the 1906-13 Grand Theater. The block also includes the 1925-29 JCPenney building. The historic district extends along 11th Street to include the red sandstone Romanesque old City Hall and the 1912 the Neo-Gothic Bethany Swedish Lutheran Church and associated parsonage.

=== 1100 block ===
The 1100 block of Ludington is primarily composed of remodeled two-story brick commercial buildings. However, the block also includes the 1903 four-story Fair Savings Store building.

=== 1200 block ===
The 1200 block of Ludington is also primarily composed of remodeled two-story brick commercial buildings. However, the block also includes the 1910 three-story Kratze Department Store building and the 1892 two-story North Star Building. The North Star Building is topped with a distinct and decorative cornice.

=== 1300 block ===
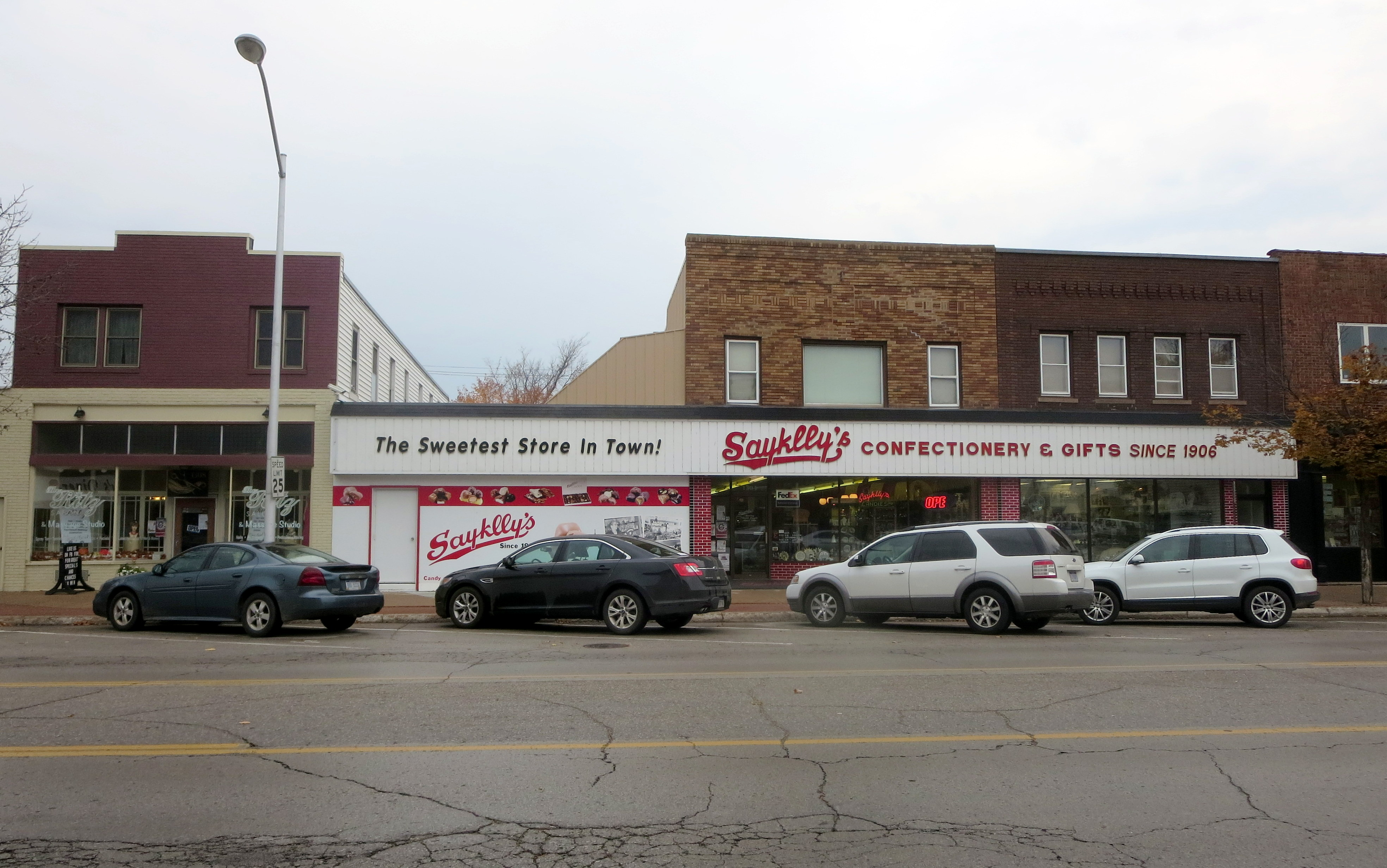
Sayklly's Candies (1304 Ludington Street)

The 1300 block of Ludington is primarily composed of small brick commercial blocks. The block notably includes Sayklly's, an Escanaba confectionery in business since 1906. Other structures in the block include the 1930s era UNeeda Lunch diner (remodeled in the 1950s) and the 1904 three-story Jepsen Block on the corner.

=== 1400 block ===
The 1400 block of Ludington is also primarily composed of small brick commercial blocks on the north side. The south side of the street contains the 1920s Northern Motors dealership, which has been a Ford automobile dealership for over eight decades.

=== 1500 block ===
The 1500 block of Ludington includes the 1914 Home Electric Building and the 1915 Clements Building, which is distinguished by its polychromatic brickwork. The north side of the street houses the 1930-31 Neo-Romanesque Escanaba Junior High School.

=== 1600 block ===
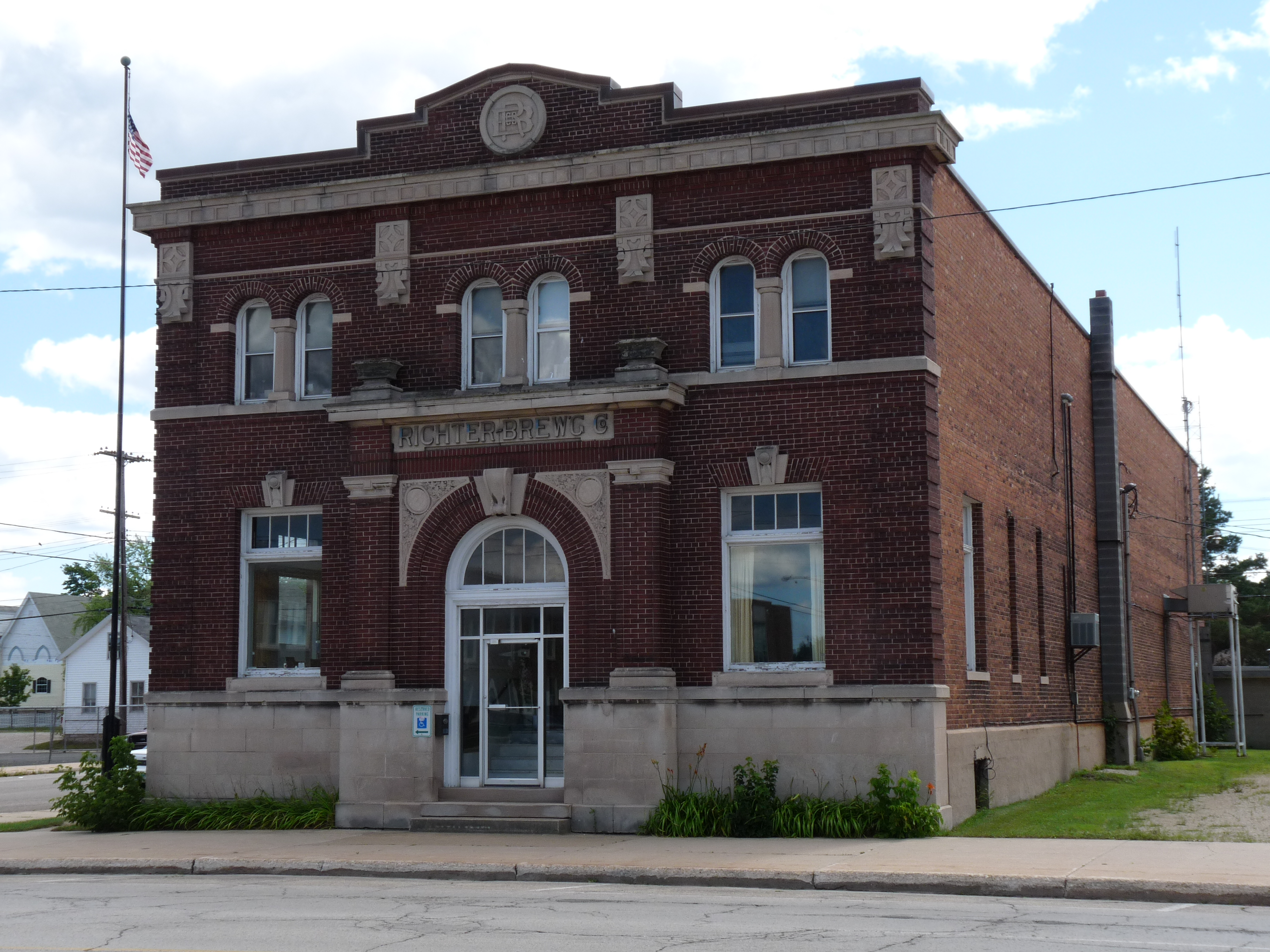
Richter Brewing Office and Bottling Works (1600 block of Ludington)

The 1600 block of Ludington includes the Richter Brewery complex, built around 1900, which consists of a two-story Classical Revival administration building and the nearby four-story Brew House. The block also includes a string of renovated single-story commercial buildings. The district also includes two industrial buildings on Stephenson Avenue, one of which was constructed in 1892 and housed cars from the Escanaba Street Railway Company.

=== 1700 block ===
The 1700 block of Ludington includes two frame commercial buildings dating from the 19th century and a 1930s concrete block and tile former service station. It also includes a c. 1950 former Dairy Queen and a broad front gabled frame structure constructed in the early 1900s that formerly housed the Stegath Lumber Company.

== Gallery ==
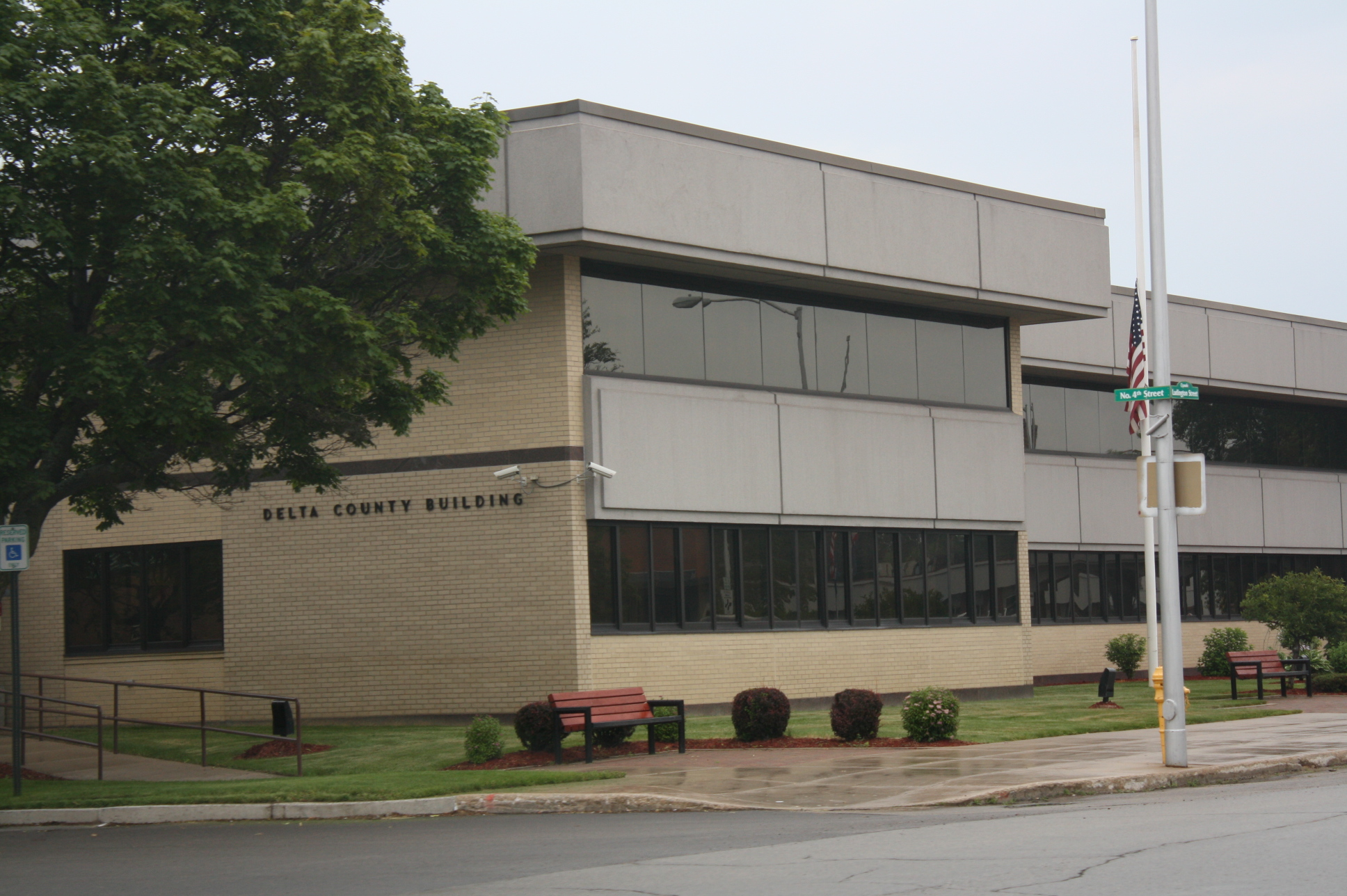
Delta County Building (300 block of Ludington)

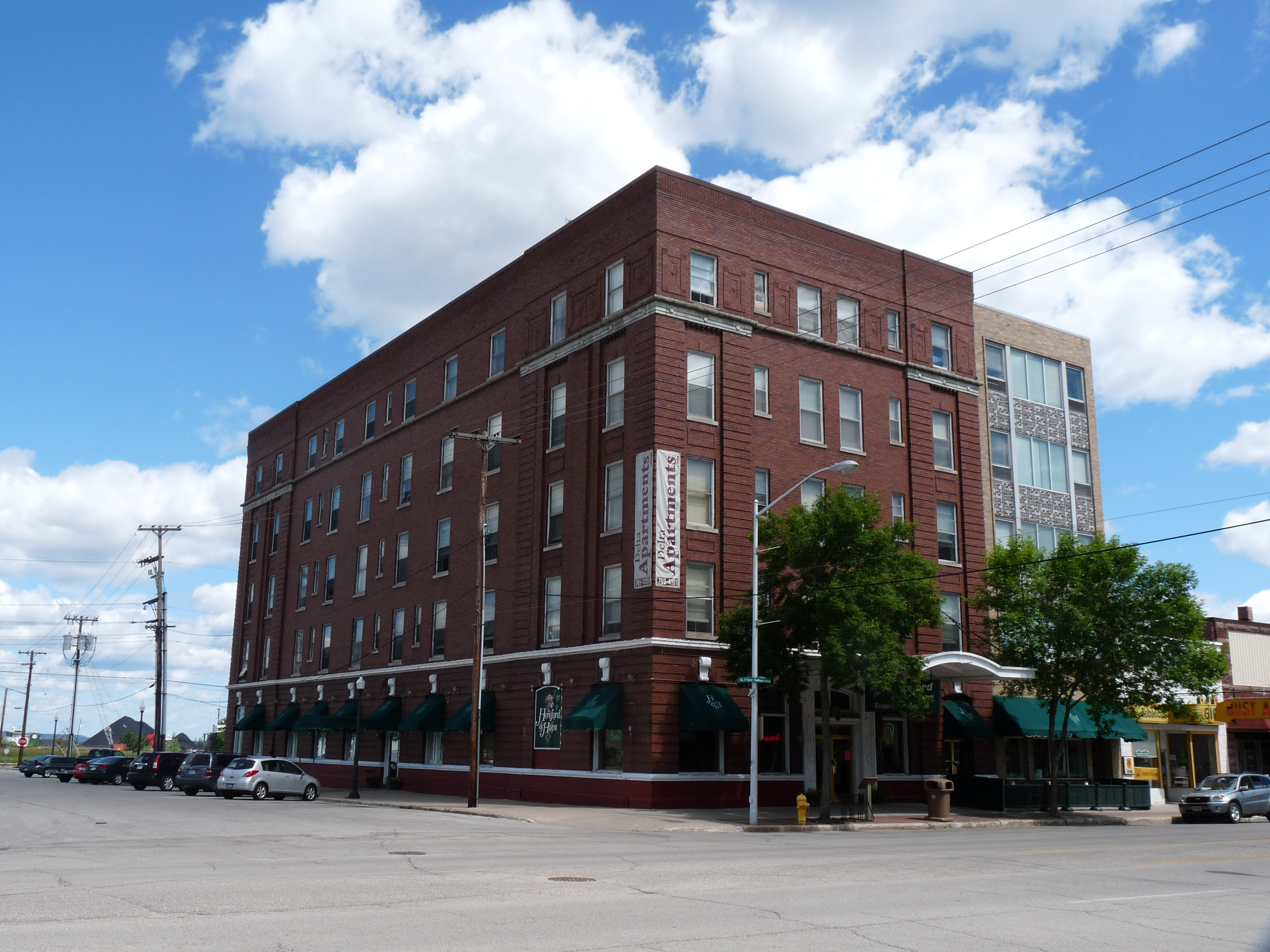
Delta Hotel (600 block of Ludington)

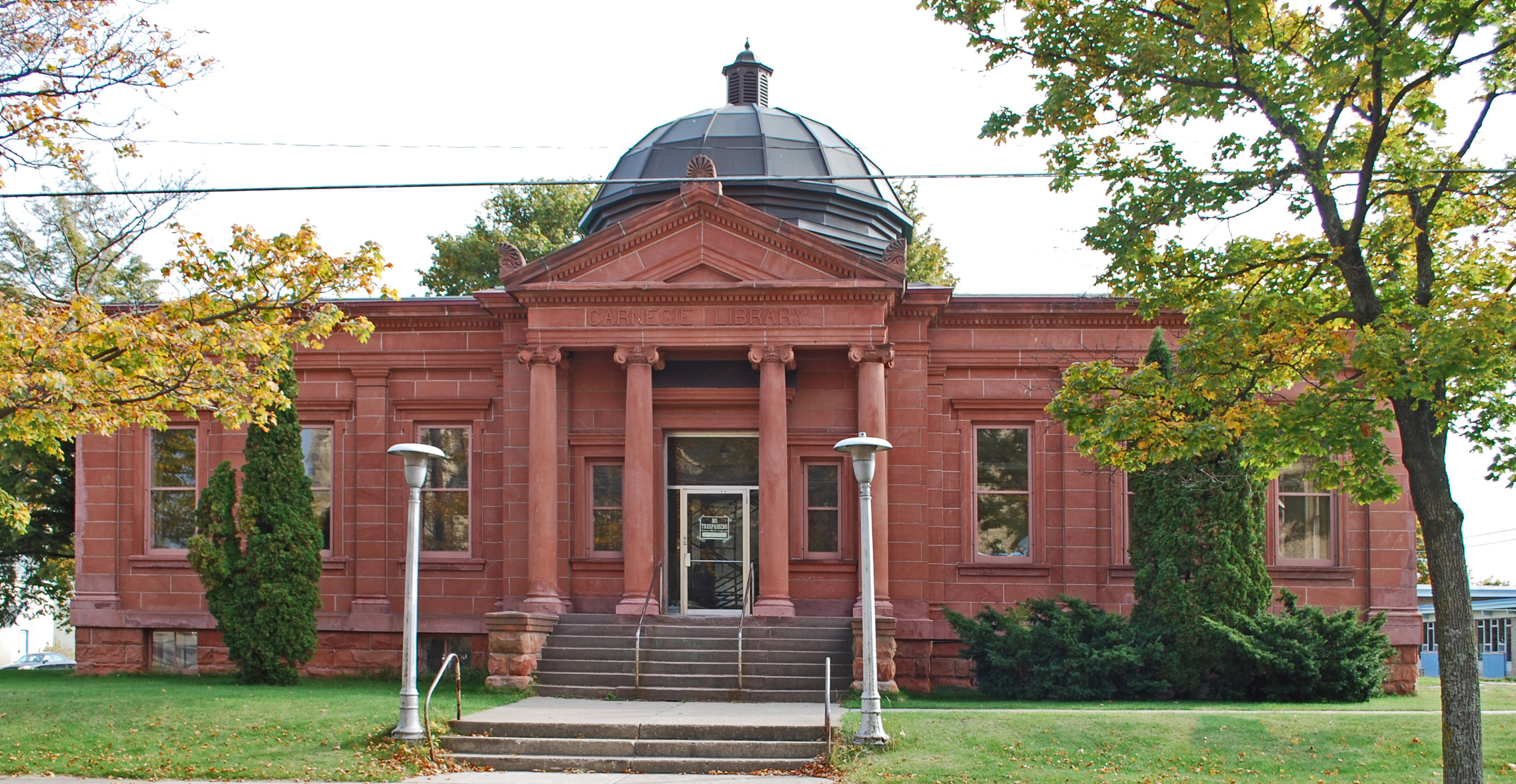
Carnegie Public Library (South Seventh Street)

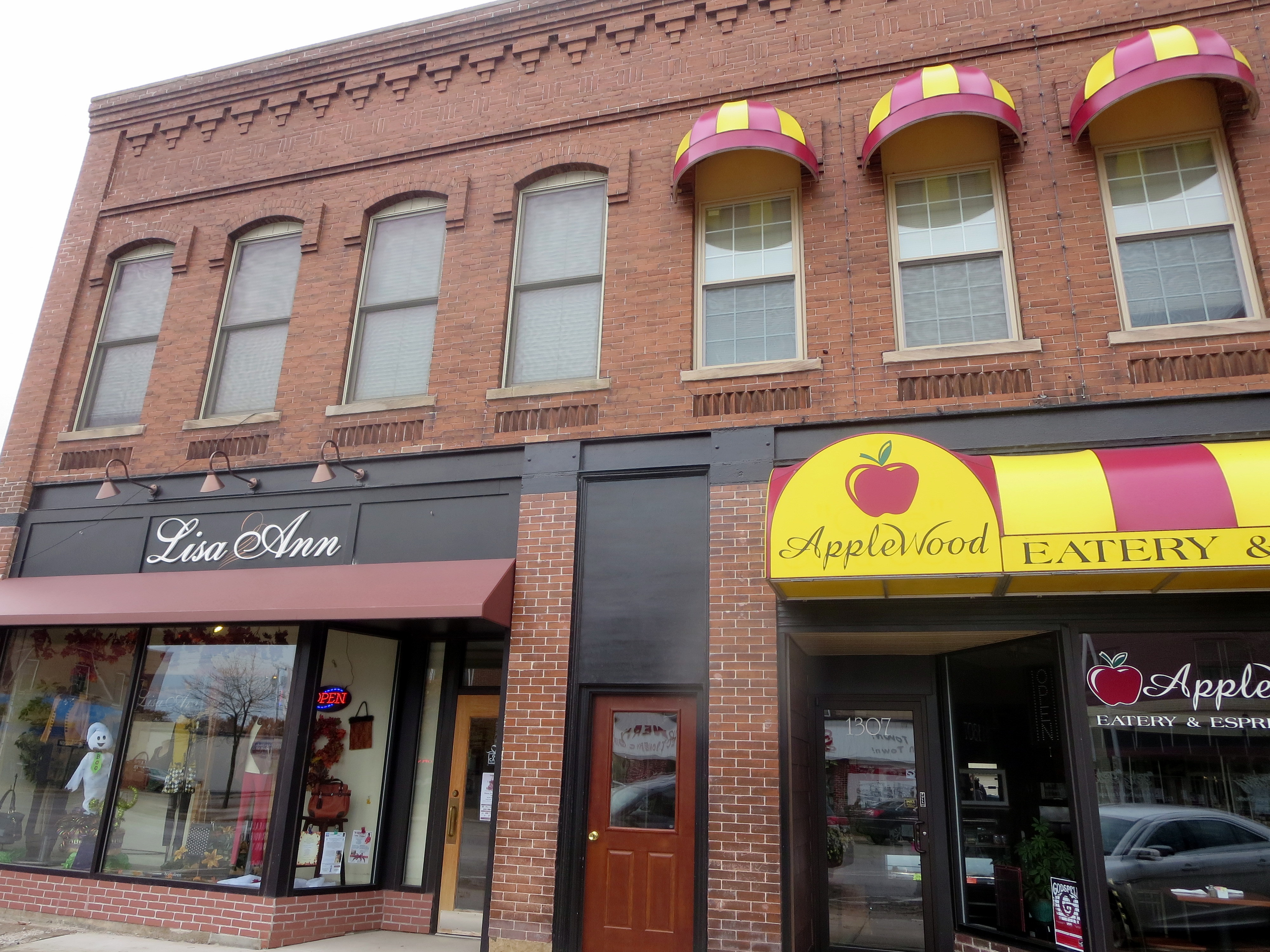
1307 Ludington Street

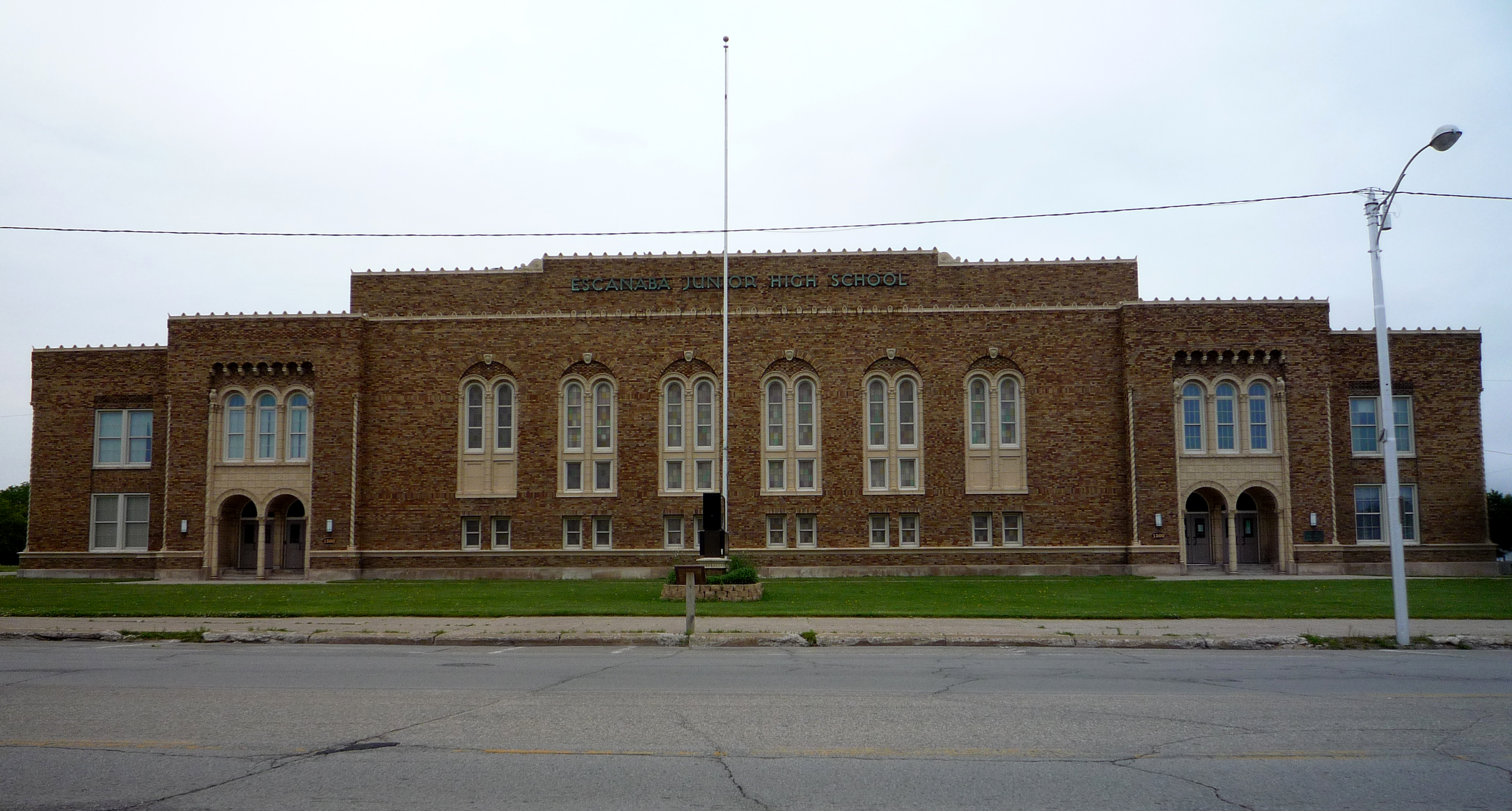
Escanaba Junior High School (1500 block of Ludington)

== See also ==
- National Register of Historic Places listings in Delta County, Michigan
