= Mahou-San Miguel Group =

Spanish brewing company

Mahou San Miguel
- Industry: Beverages
- Founded: 1890
- Headquarters: Madrid, Spain
- Products: Beers
- Website: Mahou-San Miguel

Mahou San Miguel is a Spanish brewery, founded in Madrid in 1890 under the name of Hijos de Casimiro Mahou, fábrica de hielo y cerveza (English: The Sons of Casimiro Mahou, production of ice and beer).

Mahou San Miguel is the leading brand in the Spanish beer market.

== History ==
In 1890, Enrique, Luis, and Carolina, the children of a French entrepreneur born in Lorraine, founded Hijos de Casimiro Mahou in Madrid. The French surname was to become the flagship name of one of Spain's most famous beers.

Mahou beer was first produced at the brewery on Amaniel Street, Madrid in 1891. Casimiro Mahou García played an active role in founding the Association of Beer Producers in 1922, of which he was appointed chairman. After the death of Casimiro Mahou García in 1943, his son Alfredo Mahou de la Fuente assumed responsibility for the company.

The shareholders of La Segarra signed the "Manila Agreement" in 1953 with the Chairman of the San Miguel Corporation of the Philippines, Andrés Soriano. The agreement granted a branding rights for San Miguel Spain. A new Spanish brewery was born, bearing the name of La Segarra, S.A., independent of its Philippine parent company. La Segarra would later change its name in 1957 to San Miguel, Fábricas de Cerveza y Malta, S.A. and produced its first bottle of San Miguel Especial at its Lerida brewery. That same year the company, Hijos de Casimiro Mahou became Mahou, S.A..

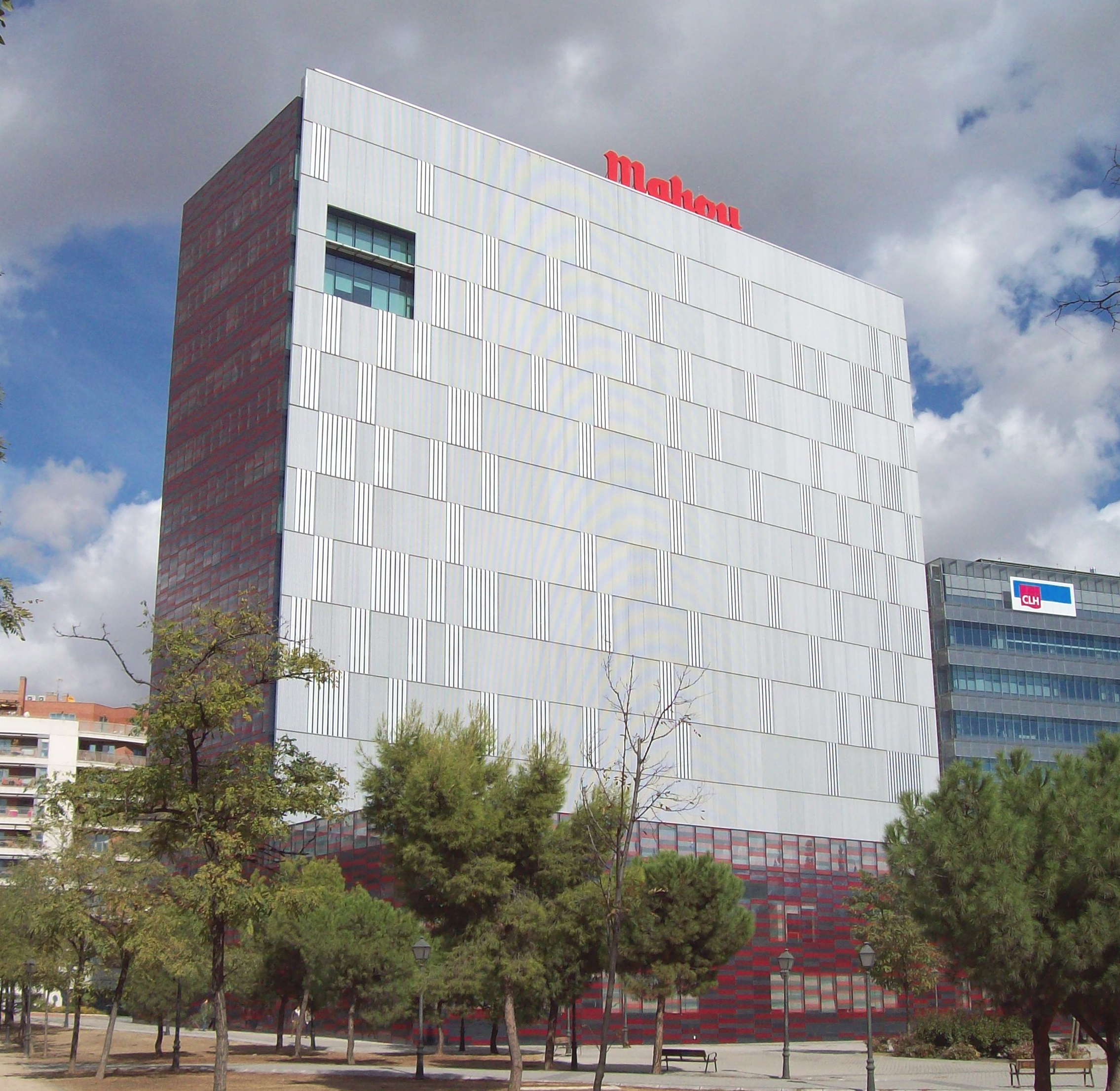
Mahou-San Miguel Group head offices (Madrid)

As sales figures rose the company moved to a new and bigger building. In 1962 the exportation of San Miguel beer began; with Mahou brewing its first beer at the Paseo Imperial Brewery in Madrid, work on which had begun the previous year. Francisco Gervás Cabrero was appointed joint managing director together with Alfredo Mahou. Some time later, the Mahou brewery on Amaniel Street shut down. Francisco Gervás Cabrero died in 1964.

In 1966, San Miguel opened a second brewery in Málaga and Mahou introduced new independent draught beer devices. Germán Gervás Diez was appointed chairman of Mahou in 1979. The Danone Group would then acquire a one-third stake in Mahou. Mahou ran its first television ad in 1984. Work began on the new Mahou brewery in Alovera, in the province of Guadalajara in 1990. In 1992, The Danone Group began the process of acquiring San Miguel.

In 2000, Mahou bought 70% of San Miguel from the Danone Group, adding to the 30% stake it already held, thereby creating a wholly Spanish-owned brewery group. After the purchase of San Miguel, Fábricas de Cerveza y Malta, S.A. by Mahou, S.A. at the end of 2000, the company was renamed Grupo Mahou-San Miguel.

In 2014 the company simplified its name to Mahou San Miguel and it acquired a 100% stake in the Indian company Arian Breweries & Distilleries. A month later, Philippines' San Miguel Corporation and Mahou San Miguel agreed to work together to unify and expand the beer brand's global footprint.

Also in 2014, it acquired a 30 percent stake in Founders Brewing, the Grand Rapids, Michigan-based craft brewery and maker of popular brews like All Day IPA and Breakfast Stout.

In 2017, Mahou acquired a 30 percent stake in Avery Brewing Company, a Boulder, Colorado-based craft brewery founded in 1993, known for beers such as White Rascal Belgian-Style White Ale, which received acclaim at the 2015 Great American Beer Festival. In April 2019 Mahou increased its stake in Avery Brewing Company to 70 percent.

In 2019, Mahou purchased a majority share in Founders Brewing. Mahou will own a 90% share in the brewery, with the remaining 10% being equally shared between the two founders of the brewery, Mike Stevens and Dave Engbers.

== Products ==
- 1890 Mahou Clásica
- 1957 San Miguel Especial
- 1969 Mahou Cinco Estrellas
- 1990 Laiker (Mahou's alcohol-free beer) Renamed as Mahou Sin
- 2001 San Miguel 0,0 (non-alcoholic beer)
- 2003 Mahou Negra, San Miguel 1516, and San Miguel ECO
- 2005 Mixta, Mahou shandy, and San Miguel 0,0% Manzana (apple-flavoured)
- 2007 San Miguel 0,0%, con Té sabor Limón (with tea lemon flavor)
- 2007 Alhambra Especial, Alhambra Reserva 1925, Mezquita, Alhambra Premium Lager, Alhambra Negra and Alhambra Sin
- Selecta XV
