= Brew Detroit =

American brewery

- Interactive map of Brew Detroit
- Type: Contract Brewery
- Location: Corktown historic district, Detroit, Michigan, U.S.
- Coordinates: 42.327659°N 83.061773°W
- Opened: September 24, 2012; 13 years ago
- Tasting: Visitor tasting room
- Website: brewdetroit.com

Brew Detroit was a contract brewery operating in Detroit, Michigan. The company also produced small-batch craft beers.

== History ==
A small group of Michigan investors formed Brew Detroit in September 2012. Their goal was to create a contract brewing company that provides larger capacity production services to a multitude of emerging Michigan beer brands. The venture started with $8 million of private capital, which allowed the company to build a facility in Detroit's historic Corktown district.

As part of its commitment to investing in Detroit, the venture donated 2% of its equity ownership to the New Common School Foundation which raises scholarship funds for the city's Cornerstone Schools.

Brew Detroit launched brewing and packaging operations at its Corktown facility in early 2014. It later opened a tasting room and retail shop in November 2015. Its initial brewing customers included four Michigan brands: Atwater Brewery, BADASS American Lager, Motor City Brewing Works, and Big Red Beverages.

Stroh's was added to its brewing clientele in 2016 when it obtained approval to brew a Bohemian-style pilsner based on Stroh's original formula.

On January 31, 2025, Brew Detroit closed its taproom. On February 17, 2025, they announced that they were acquired by Benchmark Beverage Company out of Livonia, who in December 2024 had also acquired Dark Horse Brewing Company and ROAK Brewing Company in Marshall. The company stated that they will brew five of Brew Detroit's flagship beers at the Marshall brewery, and they will be available on tap there alongside beers from Dark Horse and ROAK.
