= Carnegie Public Library (Escanaba, Michigan) =

- Escanaba Public Library
- U.S. National Register of Historic Places
- U.S. Historic district – Contributing property
- Michigan State Historic Site
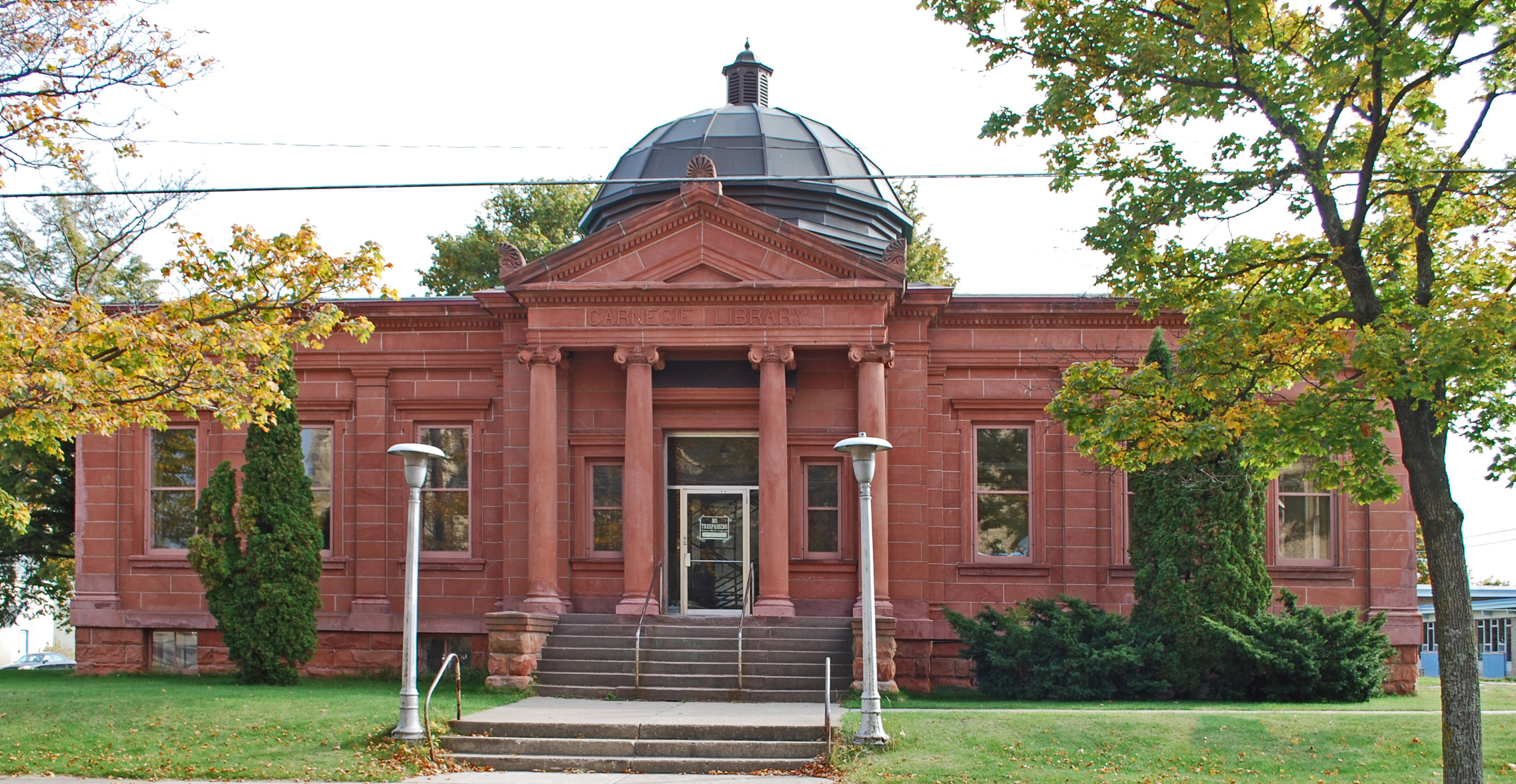

- Location within Michigan Location within the United States
- Interactive map
- Location: 201 S. 7th St., Escanaba, Michigan
- Coordinates: 45°44′39″N 87°3′22″W
- Area: < one acre
- Built: 1902
- Architect: Theodore Lohff
- Architectural style: Classical Revival
- Part of: Escanaba Central Historic District (ID14000123)
- NRHP reference No.: 77000712

Significant dates
- Added to NRHP: July 25, 1977
- Designated MSHS: January 16, 1976

The Escanaba Public Library was a Carnegie library located at 201 South Seventh Street in Escanaba, Michigan. It was listed on the National Register of Historic Places in 1977 and designated a Michigan State Historic Site in 1976.

== History ==
The Escanaba Public Library was constructed with $20,000 in funds donated by Andrew Carnegie. The city of Escanaba promised additional yearly operation funds. The building was designed by local architect Theodore Lohff. The Carnegie library opened in May 1903.

In 1992, the city began construction on a new city hall and library complex. The library moved to the new location in 1995, and the old Carnegie building was sold to private owners, who refurbished it with the intention of converting it into a private home.

== Description ==
The Escanaba Public Library is a one-story Classical Revival building constructed of red brick and Lake Superior Sandstone. It sits on a rough-faced stone foundation. The front facade has a portico entrance with an entablature and pediment supported by four Ionic columns. Windows flanked by pilasters and topped with lintels lighten the mass of the building. The building is topped with a cornice and pediments on each side; a balustrade which originally ran between the pediments was removed in 1928. A low dome originally topped building; it was removed in 1958. An upper dome still is in place. The rear of the building is of simpler design, constructed of brick and containing simple windows with stone sills.

== See also ==
- National Register of Historic Places listings in Delta County, Michigan
