= Greenbush Brewing Company =

Brewery in Michigan, United States

- Industry: Alcoholic beverage
- Founded: 2011
- Headquarters: Sawyer, Michigan, USA
- Products: Beer, Food
- Owner: Scott Sullivan
- Website: https://www.greenbushbrewing.com/

Greenbush Brewing Co. was a brewery in Sawyer, MI, USA. The brewery announced on April 14, 2026 that it would close permanently, effective immediately. However, their website now states that they are reopening in Fall of 2026.

Greenbush served beer and Southern style barbeque. Greenbush distributed beer in Michigan, Indiana, Illinois, and Kentucky. In addition to the Sawyer location, Greenbush had a location in South Bend, Indiana.

== Taproom ==
Located at 5885 Sawyer Rd, The Greenbush Taproom had 28 taps, a full menu and a loyal Mug Club. Popular beer choices include: Star Chicken Shotgun (IPA, 6.8% ABV), Sunspot (Hefeweizen, 6.0% ABV), Oro de Tontos (Vienna Lager, 4.5% ABV), Brother Benjamin (Imperial IPA, 10.10% ABV), Distorter (Porter, 7.2% ABV) etc.

== The Annex ==
The Annex featured a small pilot brewing system, 14 taps, a merchandise store, a shaded outdoor patio, occasional live music, and bocce ball courts. Food options at the Annex include sandwiches and charcuterie boards. Customers can also shop from deli options and Greenbush packaged food favorites including but not limited to Mustard Q (honey mustard), KC bbq sauce, bacon bleu dip, and Joique wing sauce.
