= Richter Brewery =

- U.S. National Register of Historic Places
- U.S. Historic district – Contributing property
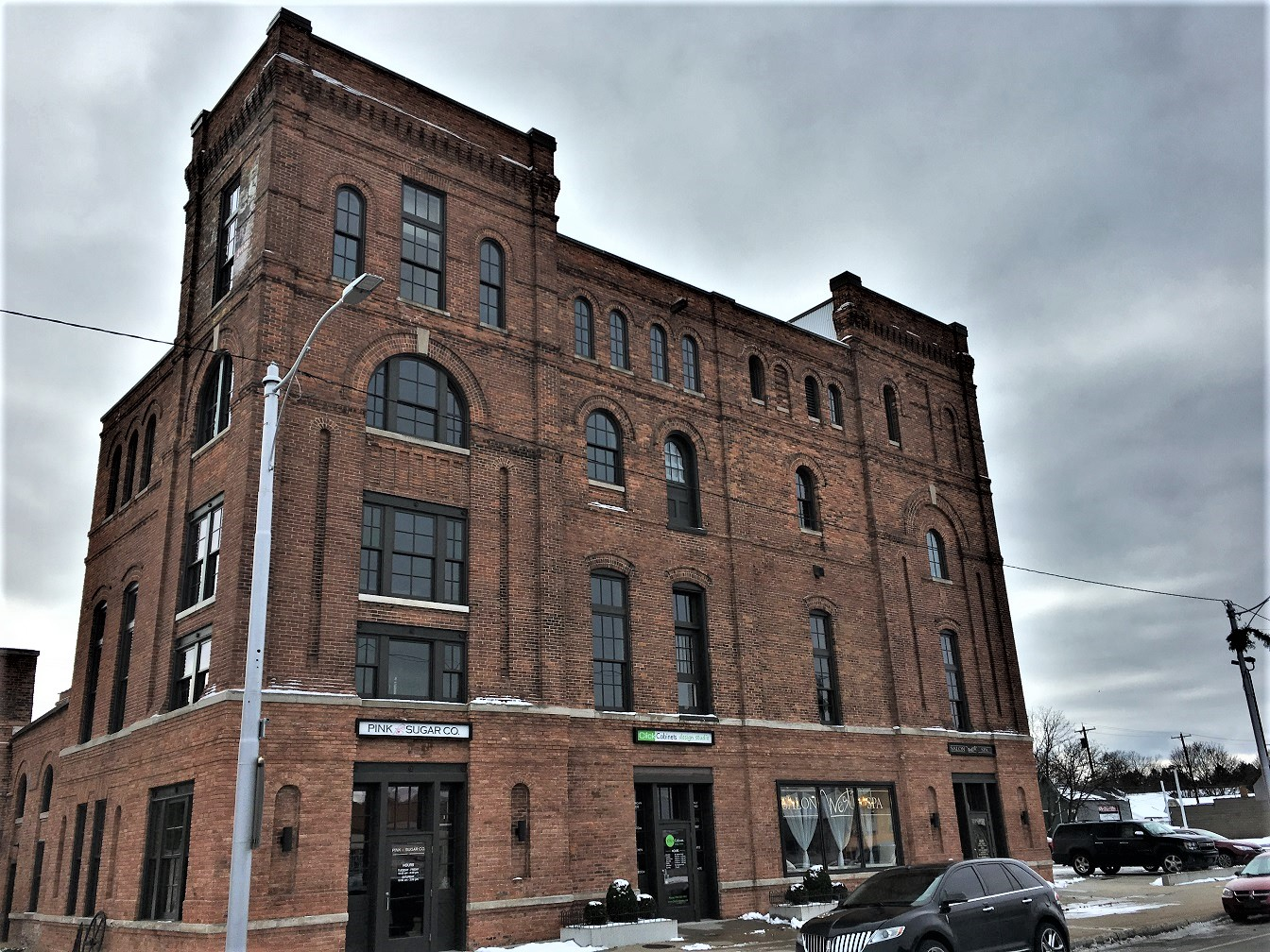

- Location within Michigan Location within the United States
- Interactive map
- Location: 1615 Ludington St. Escanaba, Michigan
- Coordinates: 45°44′47″N 87°4′15″W
- Area: less than one acre
- Built: 1900
- Architectural style: Late Victorian
- Part of: Escanaba Central Historic District (ID14000123)
- NRHP reference No.: 09000202
- Added to NRHP: April 15, 2009

The Richter Brewery, also known as the Delta Building, is a commercial building located at 1615 Ludington Street in Escanaba, Michigan. It was listed on the National Register of Historic Places in 2009.

== History ==
The Richter Brewing Company was organized in Escanaba in 1901. The company immediately hired a Milwaukee firm to design the building. Construction of the Richter Brewery proceeded from 1900 into 1901, and the Richter Brewery began manufacture in early 1901. Building and equipping the brewery cost $40,000. It was the second brewery in Escanaba. Over the next few years, additional buildings were constructed, including a keg house, office building, bottling plant, ice house and stable. All but the 1915 office building were demolished in 1929. The brewery closed at the beginning of Prohibition, and it was sold in 1925. The building was then used to manufacture non-alcoholic beverages. At the end of Prohibition, it was sold to the Delta Brewery Company. The building was again used to brew beer until the Delta Brewing Company went bankrupt in 1940.

The building remained vacant until the late 2000s. The building was purchased in 2008 with the intention of renovating it into loft apartment space; it was split into fifteen loft apartments and three ground-floor commercial spaces and named the Lofts on Ludington As of early 2012, the renovation was nearly complete, with 9 apartments leased and one of the three commercial spaces filled. It remained a mixed-use building in 2019, and has been used by the state of Michigan as an example of high-quality development.

== Description ==
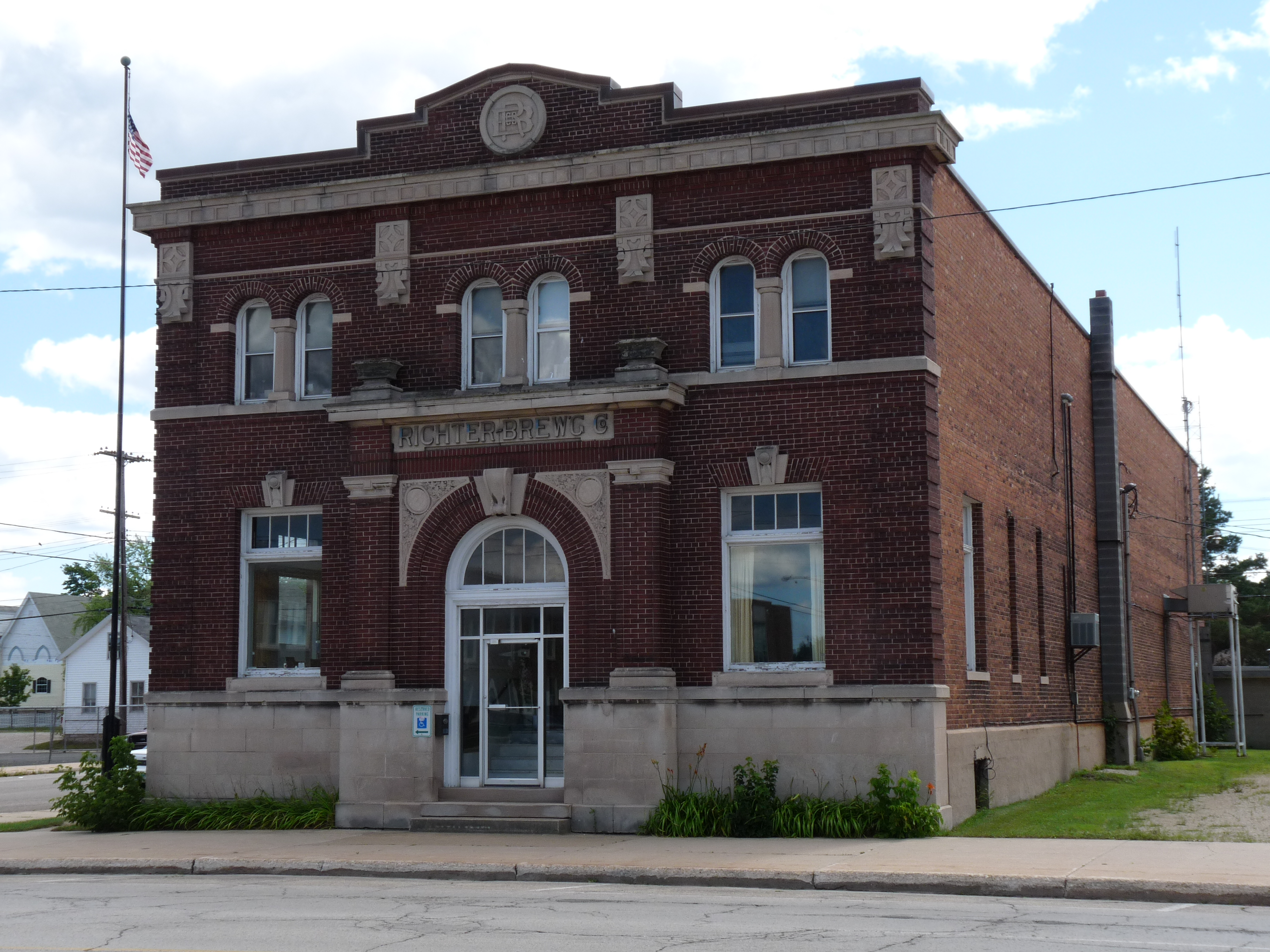
Adjacent office building

The Richter Brewery is a four-story Late Victorian building, measuring 82 feet (25 m) by 72 feet (22 m), with some Romanesque Revival architectural elements. The building has corner towers and round-head windows.

== See also ==
- National Register of Historic Places listings in Delta County, Michigan
