= Founders Brewing Company =

Michigan-based craft-style beer brewer

- Location: Grand Rapids, Michigan
- Opened: 1997
- Key people: Dave Engbers; Mike Stevens
- Annual production volume: 466,700 Barrels (as of 2017)
- Parent: Mahou-San Miguel Group
- Website: www.foundersbrewing.com

Active beers
Name	Type
All Day IPA	India Pale Ale
Backwoods Bastard	Scotch ale
Centennial IPA	India pale ale
Dirty Bastard	Scotch ale
KBS	Imperial stout
Nitro Oatmeal Stout	Oatmeal stout
Nitro Pale Ale	American pale ale
Pale Ale	American pale ale
Porter	Porter
Rubaeus	Fruit beer
Red's Rye IPA	Rye beer
Solid Gold	Lager

Seasonal beers
Name	Type
Black Rye	Rye beer
Breakfast Stout	Imperial stout

Other beers
Name	Type
Curmudgeon Old Ale	Old ale
Dark Penance	Black IPA
Devil Dancer	Imperial IPA
Double Trouble	Imperial IPA
Harvest Ale	American pale ale
Imperial Stout	Russian imperial stout

Inactive beers
Name	Type
CBS (Canadian Breakfast Stout)	Imperial stout

Canal Street Brewing Co., LLC, doing business as Founders Brewing Company, is a brewery in Grand Rapids, Michigan, known for producing several highly rated and award-winning craft-style ales, including KBS (Kentucky Breakfast Stout), Centennial IPA, Dirty Bastard, and Founders Porter. Since its founding as a craft brewery in the mid-1990s, it has grown to become the 15th largest brewery in the United States, and a prominent member of the West Michigan brewing industry. It is now majority-owned by Mahou San Miguel of Spain.

== History ==
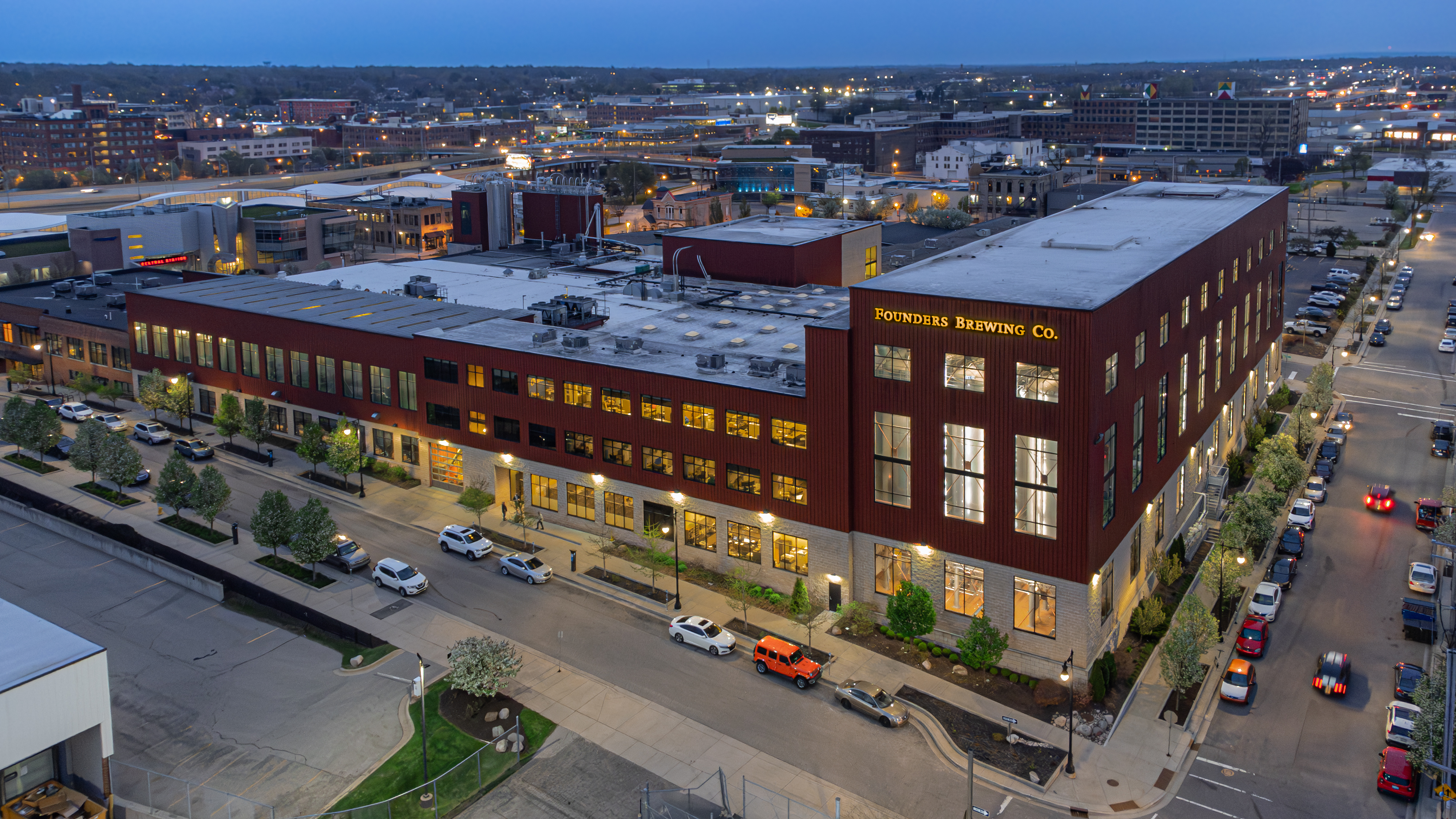
Founders Brewing Company building in 2022

Mike Stevens and Dave Engbers were homebrewing enthusiasts who had recently graduated from college. The company was originally organized in 1996 as John Pannell Brewing Company; Stevens and Engbers changed the company's name to Canal Street Brewing Co. in 1997. They took that name from the historical name of the Grand Rapids street (now Monroe Avenue) where they had set up operations, in an area where several 19th-century breweries once stood. The label for their Founders Pale Ale featured a historical image of brewers from that era with the word "Founders" above it; customers took that to be the name of the company, so Engbers and Stevens adopted it for general use.

In the 2000s, following its move to a larger facility on Grandville Avenue (now César E. Chávez Avenue), Founders became one of the most prominent breweries in Michigan, expanding its market to 37 states and its production capacity to 340,000 barrels per year. By sales volume, Founders was the 30th largest U.S. craft brewery, and 41st largest U.S. brewery overall in 2012. By 2014, Founders had climbed to the 17th largest craft brewery and the 23rd largest overall. In 2014, Founders announced a $35 million expansion to double its production capacity and allow production of 900,000 barrels per year.

In December 2014, Founders announced that Spanish brewing company Mahou San Miguel had purchased a 30% minority stake in the business. A major-brewery stake of this size led the Brewers Association to no longer designate it as a "craft" brewery. In August 2019, the company announced that it was selling another 60% to Mahou; Stevens and Engbers, would each retain 5%, with other minority stakeholders bought out.

== Beers ==
Founders produces several year-round packaged beers and a variety of seasonal and limited-production beers. Throughout the course of the year, Founders produces other beers sold on tap at their taprooms and beer festivals.

Founder's Beers
Name	Style	ABV %	IBU	Notes
All Day IPA	India Pale Ale	4.7	42	Year-round
Backwoods Bastard	Scotch Ale	11.2	50	Year-round
Centennial IPA	India Pale Ale	7.2	65	Year-round
Dirty Bastard	Scotch Ale	8.5	50	Year-round
KBS	American Imperial Stout	12	70	Year-round
Pale Ale	American Pale Ale	5.4	35	Year-round
Porter	American Porter	6.5	45	Year-round
Rubaeus	Fruit Beer	5.7	15	Year-round
Solid Gold	Lager	4.5	20	Year-round
Nitro Oatmeal Stout	Oatmeal Stout	4.5	38	Year-round draft only
Nitro Pale Ale	American Pale Ale	5.4	35	Year-round draft only
Red's Rye IPA	Rye	6.6	70	Year-round draft only
American Hopped Pilsner	Pilsner	5.5	45	Seasonal
Black Rye	Rye	7.5	78	Seasonal
Breakfast Stout	American Imperial Stout	8.3	60	Year round
Curmudgeon Old Ale	Old Ale	9.8	50	Specialty
Dark Penance	American Black Ale	8.9	100	Specialty
Double Trouble	American Imperial IPA	9.4	86	Specialty
Imperial Stout	Russian Imperial Stout	10.5	75	Specialty
Devil Dancer	American Imperial IPA	12.0	112	Limited
Harvest Ale	American IPA	7.6	70	Limited
CBS (Canadian Breakfast Stout)	American Imperial Stout	11.7	45	Limited

For several years, KBS (Kentucky Breakfast Stout) was highly sought-after during its annual release in April, but went to year-around production in 2020. It is an American Imperial Stout with a high ABV (11.2%), brewed with coffee and chocolate, and aged in bourbon barrels in nearby former gypsum mines. The "regular" Breakfast Stout is a formerly seasonal, now year-round, American Oatmeal Stout. CBS (Canadian Breakfast Stout) was released irregularly with gaps of years in between, and as of 2019 Founders had no plans to brew it again. In 2023, they began brewing it again, with a limited annual release in December.

=== Awards ===
As of 2013, two of its beers, KBS (Kentucky Breakfast Stout) and CBS (Canadian Breakfast Stout), were ranked among BeerAdvocate's top 10 beers, with CBS ranked as the 4th best beer in the world by user review. In a 2013 poll, Ratebeer.com listed Founders as the 3rd best brewery in the world overall; Founders was 2nd place in 2011 and 2012. In April 2010, Founders won four medals at the World Beer Cup in Chicago, Illinois, and the brewery went on to win two more medals at Denver's Great American Beer Festival in September of that year. The brewery also won an award at the 2012 World Beer Cup in San Diego, California.

== Taprooms ==
Founders operates a taproom in Grand Rapids. The original taproom is adjacent to the brewing operations, and in addition to its retail brews, offers beers that are only available on tap. A 14,000-square-foot Detroit taproom opened in 2017. It primarily served beers made in Grand Rapids, but also had a four-barrel brewing facility that could produce about eight kegs a week, allowing it to serve other beers as well. The Detroit taproom closed May 1, 2023.

== Local engagement ==
Founders Fest: Each June, the company organizes a festival known as Founders Fest. The street in front of the brewery is closed down and blocked off for the event. National, regional, and local acts take the stage, and local food vendors and artists have booths. Each year more than 5,000 people attend the festival. Past acts have included Mustard Plug, Blues Traveler, Umphrey's McGee, Nahko and Medicine for the People, Soulive, Toubab Krewe, That 1 Guy, Galactic, Chicago AfroBeat Project, and The Crane Wives.

Founders Mountain Bike Racing Team: In 2005, Founders became the primary sponsor of what used to be the Alger Cyclery Bicycle team, becoming Founders Racing with approximately 20 team members. The partnership between Founders and the bike team lasted approximately 19 years, but as of 2024, the team aligned with Blackrock's Brewing (out of Marquette, Michigan) as Founders Brewing local engagement decreased.

Founders Brewing was also the headline sponsor for major bike racing events in west Michigan, notably the Barry-Roubaix Killer Gravel Road Race and the Lumberjack-100 Mountain Bike Race [44][45]

== Controversies ==
Founders has had problems in some states with its labeling of beers. Until 2012, Dirty Bastard and Backwoods Bastard could not be sold in Alabama because of the name. In 2015, the label for Breakfast Stout, featuring a small child eating oatmeal, led to regulatory problems in Michigan and New Hampshire over the depiction of a child on an alcoholic beverage, requiring a temporary change in Michigan replacing the child with a note.

In 2018, former employee Tracy Evans, who is African-American, sued Founders for racial discrimination, alleging that the company had allowed a hostile work environment, passed him over for a promotion in favor of less qualified white co-workers, and fired him for complaining about it. Founders issued a statement denying the allegations. In a sworn deposition leaked to the media in October 2019, his former manager Dominic Ryan stated that he could not definitively conclude whether Evans is black or not, a position Engbers disavowed. During the controversy, Founders pulled out of the 2019 Michigan Brewers Guild Detroit Fall Beer Festival. Ryan was terminated shortly after the leak, followed by Evans and Founders settling the dispute out of court.

== See also ==
- Barrel-aged beer
