= Dark Horse Brewery =

Dark Horse Brewing Company
- Industry: Alcoholic beverage
- Founded: 1997
- Headquarters: Marshall, Michigan
- Products: Beer
- Owner: Roak Brewing Company
- Website: darkhorsebrewery.com

Dark Horse Brewing Company is a brewery and tap room in Marshall, Michigan. Its year-round brews include Crooked Tree India Pale Ale, Amber Ale, Raspberry Ale, Reserve Special Black Ale, Boffo Brown Ale, Sapient Trip Ale, and Scotty Karate scotch ale, with several seasonal and experimental brews. The brewery has won several medals at various brewing competitions. Its taproom features 3200+ mugs that fill the ceiling and walls, owned by its mug club members.

== History ==
Dark Horse Brewery began as a restaurant owned by Bill Morse. His son Aaron Morse suggested a redesign of the restaurant into a brewpub. The brewpub opened on West Michigan Avenue in Marshall. After converting its brewpub license into a microbrewery license in 1998, the taproom moved in 2000 to S. Kalamazoo Road. In 2010, Dark Horse added a general store that sells merchandise and home brewing supplies.

In early November 2010, the taproom was broken into and the building burned, in a suspected arson. Reconstruction began later that month.

In 2014, a reality show called Dark Horse Nation, featuring the company and its employees, premiered on The History Channel.

In 2019, with $12,018 in unpaid property taxes and $1.5 million in unmet mortgage payments, Dark Horse was purchased by Roak Brewing Co. of Royal Oak, Michigan. In 2021, ROAK Brewing closed its Royal Oak Michigan tap room and brewery and consolidated all of its brewing operations in Marshall, including a separate tap room and kitchen located on the Dark Horse campus.

In 2024, ROAK was acquired by Benchmark Beverage Company out of Livonia. In February of 2025, Benchmark also acquired Brew Detroit, who had recently closed their taproom in Detroit's Corktown neighborhood. Benchmark stated that they would brew five of Brew Detroit's flagship beers at the Marshall facility, and that they would be available on tap there alongside beers from Dark Horse and ROAK.

== Awards ==
The craft beer-rating website RateBeer ranked Dark Horse 29th in its 2013 list of Best Brewers in the World.
