= Michigan Brewers Guild =

The Michigan Brewers Guild is a non-profit corporation dedicated to increasing sales of Michigan brewed beer through promotions, marketing, public awareness, and consumer education while monitoring and assuring a healthy beer industry within the state.

The Brewers Guild has three levels of membership - brewery, allied trade, and enthusiast. All levels are renewed annually.

A brewery member can be any company that holds a brewer, microbrewer, or brewpub license issued by the State of Michigan.

An allied trade member can be any company commercially involved in the sale, promotion, or distribution of beer, or in the sale, promotion, production, or distribution of goods or services used by the craft beer industry.

An enthusiast member can be any person who does not qualify as a brewery member or an allied trade member, but wishes to support the Brewers Guild on a personal level. Enthusiast members receive early entry to the Guild's beer festivals, a T-shirt, invitations to VIP brewery tours, and discounts at member breweries. The website also includes information on beer and food pairing, cooking with food, beer styles and ingredients (including locally sourced hops and barley tied to Michigan's agricultural industry) and beer-cations and brewery tourism options around the state - tied in the Pure Michigan campaign.

Regular updates can be found on the Guild's website, . Information regularly includes festival beer and brewery lists, local hotel information, ticket outlets, and press releases regarding member breweries. Information about beer and food pairings, beer styles and ingredients (including locally sourced hops and barley) as well as suggested beer-cations and brewery tourism options are also available online.

== History ==
The Michigan Brewers Guild was founded by representatives from thirty different Michigan brewing operations December 1997 as an organization dedicated to championing the cause of craft brewed beer in the State of Michigan. There are currently 300+ member breweries in the Michigan Brewers Guild representing over 90% of the brewing licenses in the state.

== Beer Festivals ==
The Guild hosts four yearly outdoor beer festivals. The Summer Beer Festival, established 1997, is held in the historic Depot Town neighborhood of Ypsilanti the fourth Saturday (and the Friday before) of July. The Winter Beer Festival, established 2006, is held Grand Rapids the fourth Saturday of February. The UP Fall Beer Festival is held in Marquette the Saturday after Labor Day. Finally, the Detroit Fall Beer Festival is held at Eastern Market in Detroit the fourth Saturday of October. Events typically sell out.

In 2020, a fifth outdoor beer festival, the Spring Beer Festival, was scheduled for May 16 at Turtle Creek Stadium in Traverse City. It was canceled due to the novel coronavirus pandemic.

Beginning in 2008, the Brewers Guild set a goal to operate its beer festivals as "Zero-Waste" events. They work closely with local recycling and composting companies to manage the removal of any plastic, aluminum, paper, and food waste to ensure that as much of it is recycled or composted as possible. Their efforts have resulted in less than 10% of the event waste going to landfill (based on weight). This has been achieved by requiring the use of plates and bowls made from sugarcane, cutlery made from potatoes, and "plastic" cups made from corn (PLA) - all of which are compostable! There are also bulk water stations instead of bottled water. So if you attend one of the Guild's festivals, do your part by not bringing any products with you that may not be able to be recycled or composted.
