= Appalachian Brewing Company =

American brewery

Coordinates: 40.2658°N 76.8753°W

- Appalachian Brewing Company Logo
- Interactive map of Appalachian Brewing Company
- Location: (United States) Harrisburg, Pennsylvania, USA
- Opened: 1997
- Annual production volume: 15,000 US beer barrels (18,000 hL)
- Owned by: Appalachian Brewing Company

Active beers
Name	Type
Aero-Head	Bock
Trail Blaze Maple	Brown ale
Chocolate Avenue	Stout
Outta Focus	Double IPA
Water Gap	Wheat ale
Mountain Lager	Dortmunder Export
Hoppy Trails	IPA
Jolly Scot	Scottish style ale

The Appalachian Brewing Company, commonly known as ABC, is an American brewery in Harrisburg, Pennsylvania. It was founded in January 1997. Appalachian also operates pubs in Gettysburg, Lititz, Mechanicsburg and Shippensburg. The logo features the Rockville Bridge, which crosses the Susquehanna river just north of Harrisburg.

== Craft beer ==
=== Flagship brews ===
- Aero-Head Bock
- Trail Blaze Maple Brown Ale
- Chocolate Avenue Stout
- Outta Focus Double IPA
- Water Gap Wheat Ale
- Mountain Lager Dortmunder Export
- Hoppy Trails India Pale Ale
- Jolly Scot Scottish Style Ale

=== Seasonal specialty brews ===
- Zoigl Star Lager Unfiltered Lager
- Celtic Knot Irish Red Ale
- Anniversary Maibock
- Mad Cameron Belgian Wit
- Hinterland Hefe Weizen
- Volks Weizenbock
- Kipona Fest Marzen
- Fresh Hop Pale Ale
- Rutty Buck Pumpkin Ale
- Batch No. 666 Halloween Beer
- Grinnin' Grizzly Holiday Spiced Ale
- Pennypacker Porter

== Craft soda ==
Craft sodas include:

- Appalachian Root Beer
- Diet Appalachian Root Beer
- Appalachian White Birch Beer
- Appalachian Ginger Beer

== See also ==
- List of food companies
