= Schoenhofen Brewery Historic District =

Historic district in Illinois, United States

- U.S. National Register of Historic Places
- U.S. Historic district
- Chicago Landmark
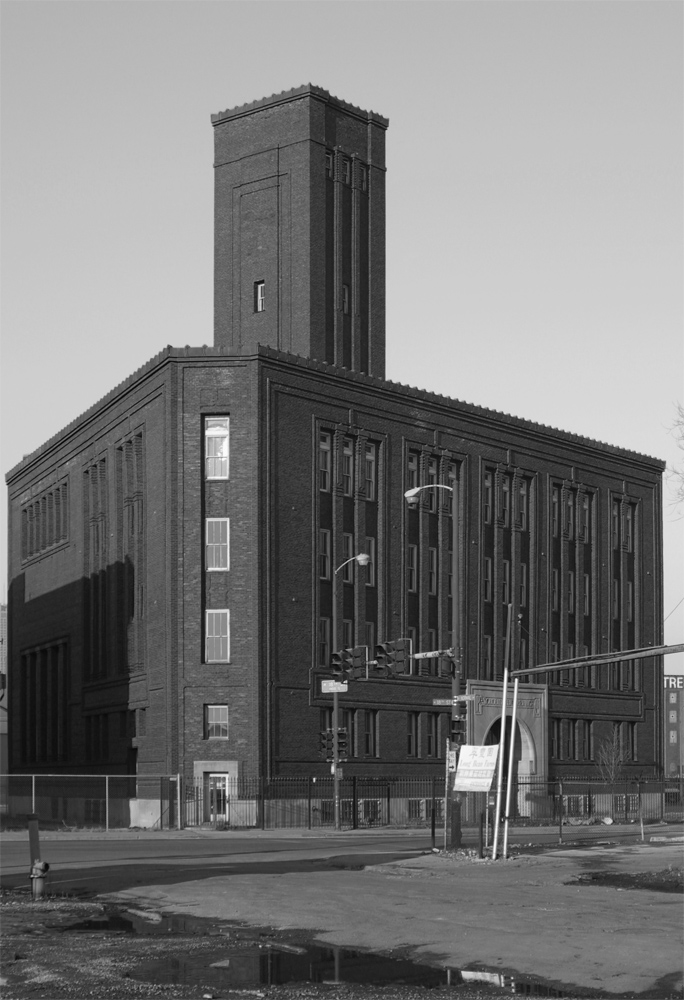
- Location: Chicago, IL
- Coordinates: 41.8576°N 87.6394°W
- Built: 1878
- Architect: Administration: Adolph Cudell; Powerhouse: Richard Schmidt, Hugh M. G. Garden
- Architectural style: late-Victorian, Prairie School
- NRHP reference No.: 78001128

Significant dates
- Added to NRHP: December 27, 1978
- Designated CHICL: July 13, 1988

The Schoenhofen Brewery Historic District is centered on the former site of the Peter Schoenhofen Brewing Company at 18th and Canalport Avenue in the Pilsen neighborhood of Chicago, Illinois.

== Schoenhofen Brewing ==
Beginning in the mid-1880s, Peter Schoenhofen was among a group of brewers in Chicago who transformed production methods and utilized expanding transportation options. By 1900, there were sixty Chicago breweries that collectively produced over 100 million gallons of beer per year. The Schoenhofen brewery building survived prohibition and competition from national brands. Breweries, food factories, and stockyards dotted the Chicago area by the mid-20th century. The Schoenhofen Brewery was typical of the region, although enterprises were not located in the city center, but along the new rail lines. No mention is made of the artesian springs as the source of the Brewery's water supply "In the basement of the old brewery building is the only artesian well still in existence in the Chicago area. At 1600 feet deep the well is capable of producing one million gallons of water a day for the next 100 years." ( 2000 )

== Overview ==
Seventeen buildings once occupied the site when the brewery reached maximum capacity in 1910 at 1,200,000 barrels a year. Two of the remaining buildings demonstrate the change in architectural styles that occurred at the turn of the century in the United States. The brewery's administration building was constructed in 1886, with ornate designs of the late-Victorian era. The powerhouse, constructed in 1902, is an example of second-generation "Chicago School" architectural style, with ornamental brickwork at the columns between windows, and simplified brickwork at the window piers and the piers and spandrels.

The brewery district was listed on the National Register of Historic Places on December 27, 1978 and the Administration Building and Powerhouse were later designated Chicago Landmarks on July 13, 1988.

== See also ==
- Green River (soft drink)
- National Register of Historic Places listings in West Side Chicago
- List of defunct breweries in the United States

== In popular culture ==
In the 1980 movie The Blues Brothers, Jake and Elwood return to the orphanage where they were raised. The movie portrays the location as being in Calumet City, but the external location was a facade constructed for the film in between two of the Schoenhofen Brewery buildings at the end of an alley that was once Normal Ave, north of W. 18th Street.
