= Spiced ale =

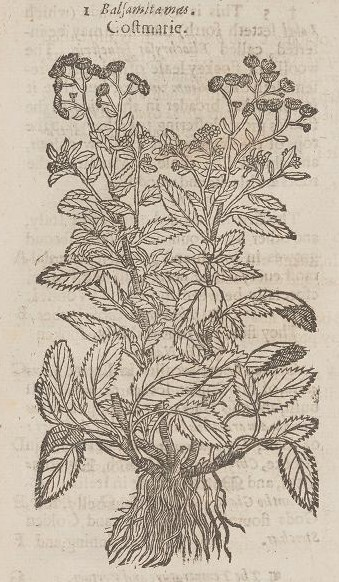
Depiction of costmary in John Gerard's The Herball, or Generall Historie of Plantes, 1633. It is mentioned by the author as an additive for ale.

Spiced ale refers to traditional ales flavored with non-traditional spices and herbs. Spiced ales are sometimes brewed as a seasonal beer, such as during the time of Christmas or other holidays.

== History ==
An early written reference about spiced ale can be found in Geoffrey Chaucer's The Miller's Tale:

...He sente hire pyment, meeth, and spiced ale,
And wafres, pipyng hoot out of the gleede...

Before about AD 1700 the word ale referred to a malt beverage made without hops, in contrast to hopped beer. In the early modern period the word ale can also refer to a beer brewed with a small quantity of hops. (Note: "The Liquor call'd Ale, in distinction from beer, is usually of less strength; and is less tinctured with the hop : being intended for drinking soon after it is brewed; not for keeping years as the other.")

Sir Hugh Plat's Delightes for Ladies, published 1602, describes several ways to flavour previously brewed ales:

I Cannot remember that euer I did drinke the like sage ale at any time, as that which is made by mingling two or three droppes of the extracted oyle of sage with a quart of Ale, the same beeing well brued out of one pot into another: and this way a whole Stand of sage ale is very speedily made. The like is to bee done with the oyle of Mace or Nutmegs. But if you will make a right gossips cup that shall farre exceed all the Ale that euer mother Bunch made in her life time, then in the bottling vp of your best Ale, tunne halfe a pinte of white Ipocras that is newly made, and after the best receipt, with a pottle of Ale, stoppe your bottle close, and drinke it when it is stale: Some commend the hanging of roasted Orenges prickt full of Cloues in the vessell of Ale till you find the taste therof sufficietly graced to your own liking.

Costmary (also called alecost) is a bitter aromatic plant and was frequently put into ale. The 16th-century physician Thomas Cogan, describes "Alecoast Ale" in his Haven of Health as a pleasant drink. The plant is also mentioned in Gerard's Herball, or Generall Historie of Plantes in connection with ale. (Note: "Costmarie is put into Ale to steepe, as also into the barrels and Stands amongst those herbs wherewith they do make Sage Ale; which drinke is very profitable for the diseases before spoken of.")

Thomas Short in Medicina Britannica notes about meadowsweet that an "Infusion of the Leaves, in Wine or Ale, gives them a most grateful Smell and Taste, like Burnet". Likewise, he recommends avens root for flavouring wine and ale.

Braggot is a drink brewed from ale, honey, spices and herbs. It was esteemed in Wales and the West of England. The drink also appears in written sources as bragot, bragget etc. According to an Old English dictionary, the word derives from brag, meaning malt, especially in Cornwall and Wales, and got, meaning honeycomb. One of the laws of the medieval Welsh king Hywel Dda specifies that a farmer should render one vat of mead as a tribute. If mead was unavailable, two vats of braggot were to be paid instead. Failing this, four vats of common ale would be acceptable. Historical braggot recipes can be found for example in The Customs of London (early 16th c.), The Jewel House of Art and Nature (1653) and The Whole Duty of a Woman (1701). Generally, the drink was made by adding honey and spices to previously brewed ale and refermenting the mixture for some time. In some old recipes, the base ingredient is specified either as small ale or strong ale. Wright's Dictionary of Obsolete and Provincial English contains a recipe from a 14th-century manuscript: (Note: The recipe is given in apothecaries' weights.)

To make Bragotte. Take to x galons of ale, iij potell of fyne worte, and iij quartis of hony, and putt therto canell ʒ. iiij, peper schort or long, ʒ. iiij., galingale, ʒ. j., and clowys, ʒ. j., and gingiver, ʒ. ij.

Some old porter recipes contain liquorice extract as an ingredient. This flavouring appears as Spanish juice or Leghorn juice in early 19th-century texts.
