= Sprecher Brewery =

Craft brewery in Wisconsin, U.S.

Coordinates: 43.09971°N 87.919566°W

Sprecher Brewery Co. Inc.
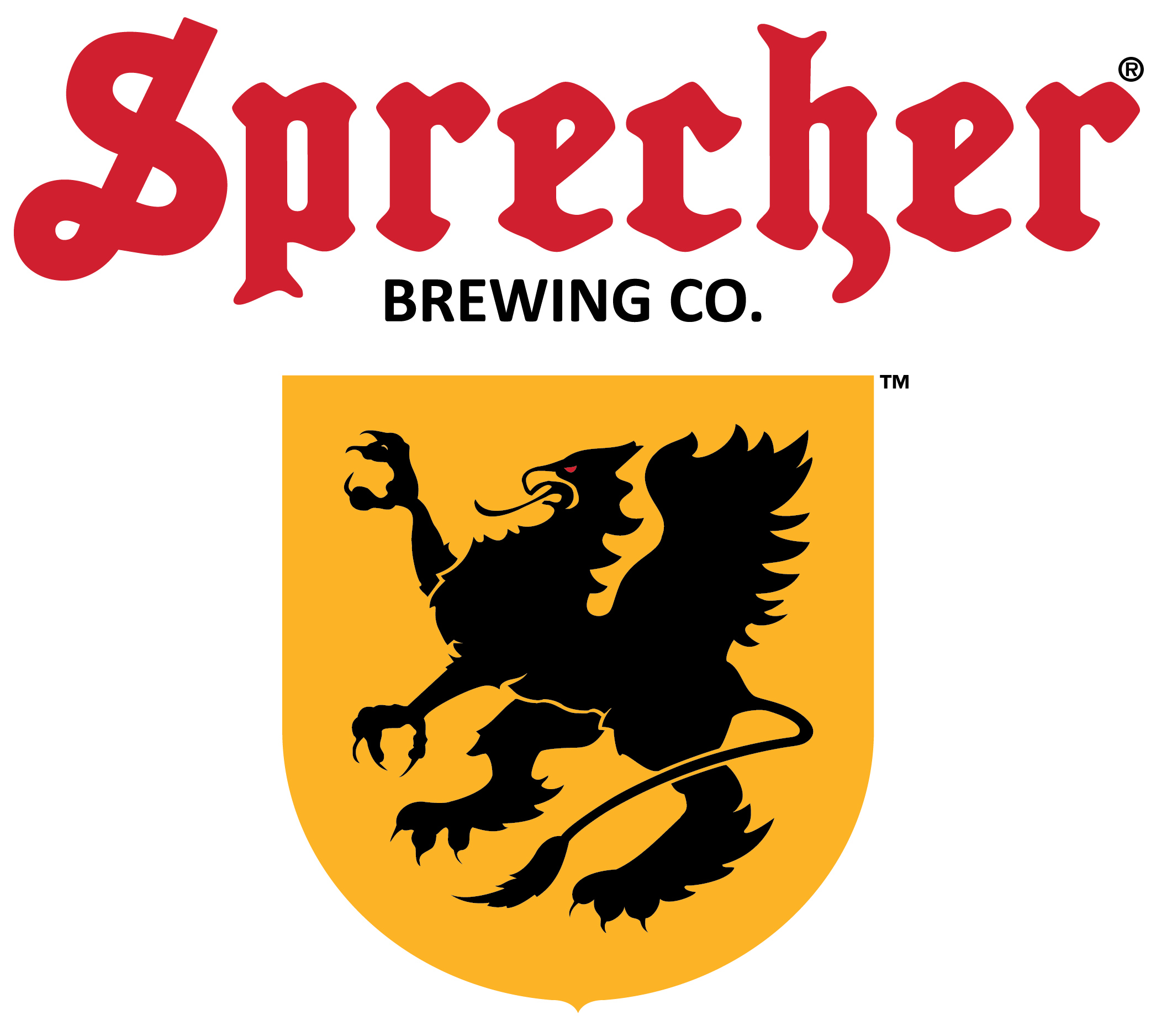
- Sprecher Brewery logo originally designed by Charlie Radtke, Milwaukee, Wisconsin

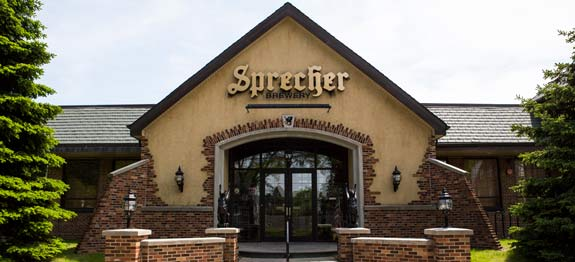
- Sprecher Brewery in Glendale
- Industry: Alcoholic beverages, soft drinks
- Founded: 1985
- Headquarters: Glendale, Wisconsin, U.S.
- Products: Beer, soda
- Website: sprecherbrewery.com

Sprecher Brewery is a brewery in Glendale, Wisconsin, U.S. It was founded in 1985 in Milwaukee by Randal Sprecher, and is Milwaukee's first craft brewery since Prohibition. Sprecher produces an assortment of beers, flavored malt beverages, and craft sodas, and it is famous for its root beer.

Sprecher brews more root beer than all of its alcoholic beers combined.

== History ==
The founder, Randal Sprecher, a California native, earned his first degree in oceanography and his second in brewing. He was employed by Pabst in Milwaukee. After just over four years at Pabst, he founded his own brewery in 1985. The new brewery was started on a budget of $40,000. Sprecher hand-manufactured and purchased equipment to keep costs down, including a 16-oz. bottling machine from Coca-Cola, and some of this equipment remains in use today. The current Sprecher facility was acquired in 1994.

In January 2020, a group of local investors acquired Sprecher Brewery, with Sharad Chadha taking the helm as CEO and President. The new leadership expanded distribution by 10 states, up to 30 total, and grew production capacity by added a new canning line and warehouse space. Over the course of two years, the company doubled to 110 people and went from running a single shift four days a week to double shifts five days a week with the capacity to expand further. In October 2021, Sprecher acquired six soda brands from Chicago-based WIT Beverage Co., including Green River. Other acquired brands include WBC Chicago-style craft sodas, Wisconsin Black Bear sodas, Oak Creek barrel-aged rootbeers, Caruso's Italian-style craft sodas, and Claire Baie sparkling water, lemonade, and tea.

In January 2022, Sprecher transitioned all of its beer styles from bottles to cans, and accompanied a brand refresh with new labels.

In October 2023, Sprecher acquired Ooh La Lemin Lemonade from Kona Gold Beverages. Also in October 2023, Sprecher acquired a packaging company called Excent, LLC.

In January 2024, Sprecher acquired Juvee.

== Production ==
Raw Wisconsin honey is used as a primary ingredient in its root beer, and Sprecher Ginger Ale uses locally grown ginger. Sprecher's recipe and method for producing its root beer has remained unchanged since its founding. The brewing uses a "fire-brewed" process that brews in a kettle with fire underneath, rather than steam, which caramelizes the sugars and helps blend flavors and create complexity.

=== Year-round beers ===
- Special Amber – Vienna Lager
- Black Bavarian – Schwarzbier
- Hefe Weiss – Bavaria wheat ale
- Abbey Triple – Belgian Tripel
- Pineapple X-Press – Belgian IPA
- Juicy IPA – Juicy India Pale Ale

=== Seasonal beers ===
Seasonal beers include:

- Mai Bock – Blonde Bock (spring)
- Milwaukee Pils – Bohemian Style Lager (summer)
- Oktoberfest – Märzen (autumn)
- Winter Lager – Bavarian-Style Dunkel (winter)

=== Limited release beers ===
- Czar Brew – Bourbon Barrel Aged Imperial Stout
- Imperial Stout – Imperial Stout
- Framboise – Belgian-Style Lambic

=== Sodas ===
- Green River
- Root Beer
- Lo-Cal Root Beer
- Energy Root Beer (caffeinated root beer)
- Maple Syrup Root Beer
- Cream Soda
- Lo-Cal Cream Soda
- Orange Dream
- Lo-Cal Orange Dream
- Cherry Cola
- Door County Cherry Soda
- Black Cherry
- Grape
- Ginger Ale – Wisconsin Ginger
- Puma Kola – cola with vanilla + cinnamon
- Caffeinated Citrus Splash
- Ginger Beer
- Dr Sprecher
- Mt Sprecher – orange + lemon + lime + grapefruit soda
- Strawberry (seasonal)
- Honeycrisp Apple (seasonal)
- Raspberry (seasonal)
- Blueberry (seasonal)
- Ravin Red (seasonal) – cranberry + cherry
- Valencia Orange Sparkling Water
- Red Raspberry Sparkling Water
- Fresh Cut Mango Sparkling Water
- Ripe Strawberry Sparkling Water
- Charged Lemonade
- Charged Strawberry Lemonade

These sodas are fairly rare in the soft drink industry in that they are sweetened with pure honey rather than sugar, high-fructose corn syrup, or a newer artificial sweetener.

== Brewery tour ==
Sprecher Brewery offers year-round tours of its facility, including the brew house, the refrigerated cellar, and the bottling line and warehouse. Tours conclude in the indoor beer garden where customers are welcome to sample a wide range of beers and sodas on tap.

=== Traveling beer garden ===
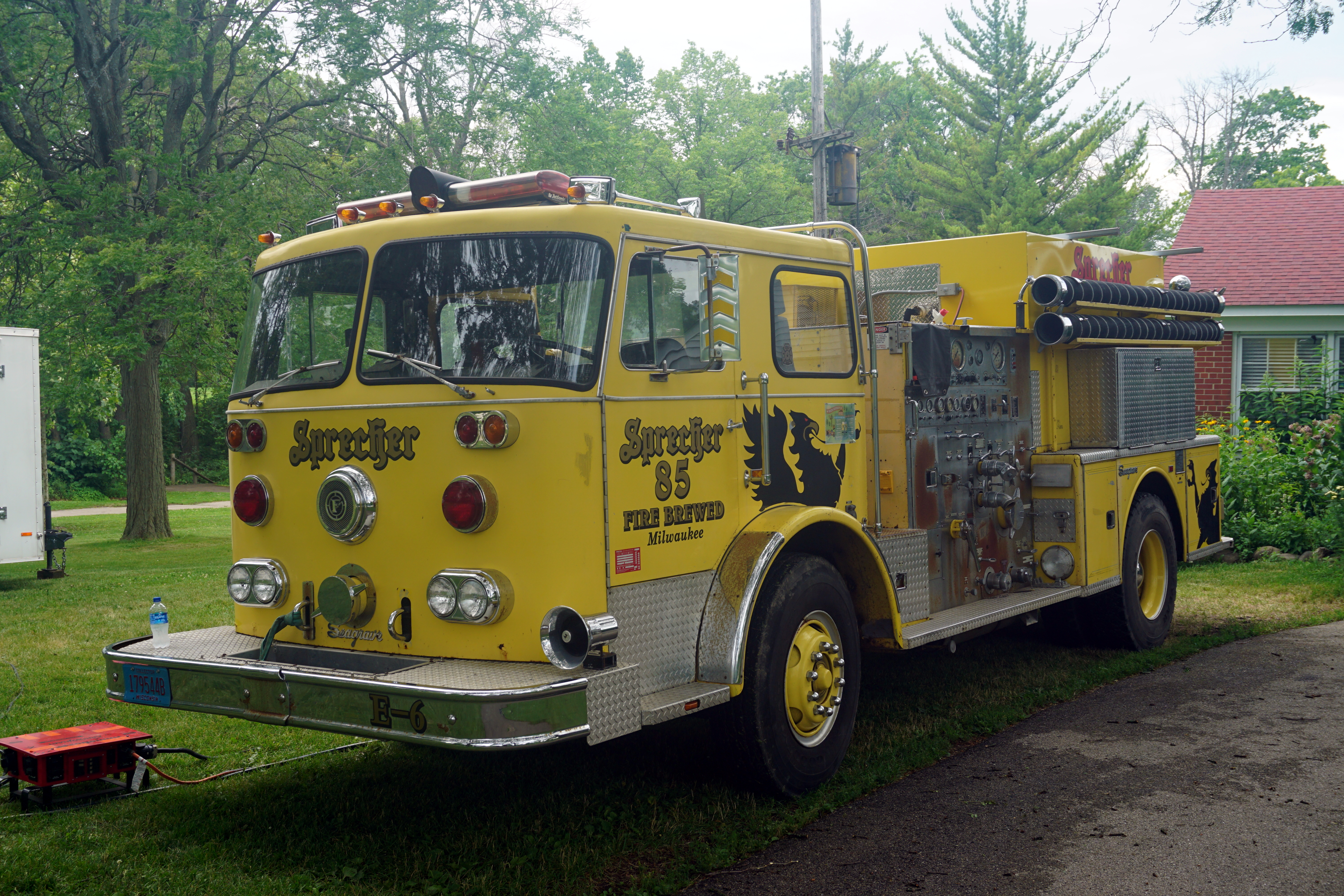
Sprecher fire truck at Lake Park

Sprecher has two sets of firetrucks and ambulances that serve as Milwaukee County Parks Traveling Beer Gardens from Memorial Day to Labor Day. Each set visits a Milwaukee County Park for ten days, then moves to another location throughout the summer.

== Recognition ==
Sprecher has earned awards for 25 different beer types in prestigious national and international competitions. Awards include: 2004 GABF Small Brewing Company of the Year and 2004 GABF Small Brewing Company Brewmaster of the Year. 2007 Australian International Beer Awards, Best of Show & Gold Medal - Russian Imperial Stout; Dopple Bock - Silver; Piper's Scotch Ale - Bronze; 2014 World Beer Cup, Gold - Black Bavarian (Schwarzbier); Bronze - Shakparo (Gluten free); 2004, Bronze - Winter Brew; 2002, Gold - Winter Brew. Several awards annually at both the Los Angeles International Beer Competition and the United States Open Beer Championships.

In a 2008, The New York Times taste test, four judges ranked Sprecher's number one among 25 root beers from across the United States for its "wonderfully balanced and complex brew." A review in the October 2009 edition of Details also praised the root beer as "elegant."

== In popular culture ==
2005: Won "Most Deserving Small Business Office" Makeover from Xerox, Hon Furniture and Entrepreneur magazine. Featured on NBC's Today show. In November 2006, a contestant on NBC's Deal or No Deal was offered a life-time supply of Sprecher's Root Beer, his favorite soda.

== See also ==
- Beer in Milwaukee
