= Green River (soft drink) =

American brand of soft drink

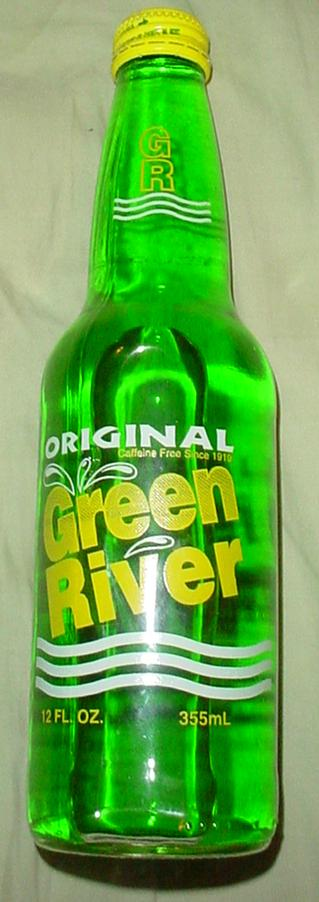
- Type: Carbonated soft drink
- Distributor: Sprecher Brewery
- Origin: United States, Davenport, Iowa
- Introduced: 1919; 107 years ago
- Color: Chartreuse green
- Related products: Schoenhofen Edelweiss; Sweetwater Brewery
- Website: Sprecher Brewery website

Green River is a bright green, lime-flavored soft drink. It was created by Richard C. Jones in Davenport, Iowa, sold widely by the Chicago-based Schoenhofen Edelweiss Brewing Company in 1919, subsequently sold by other vendors, and is currently manufactured by Sprecher Brewery.

== History ==
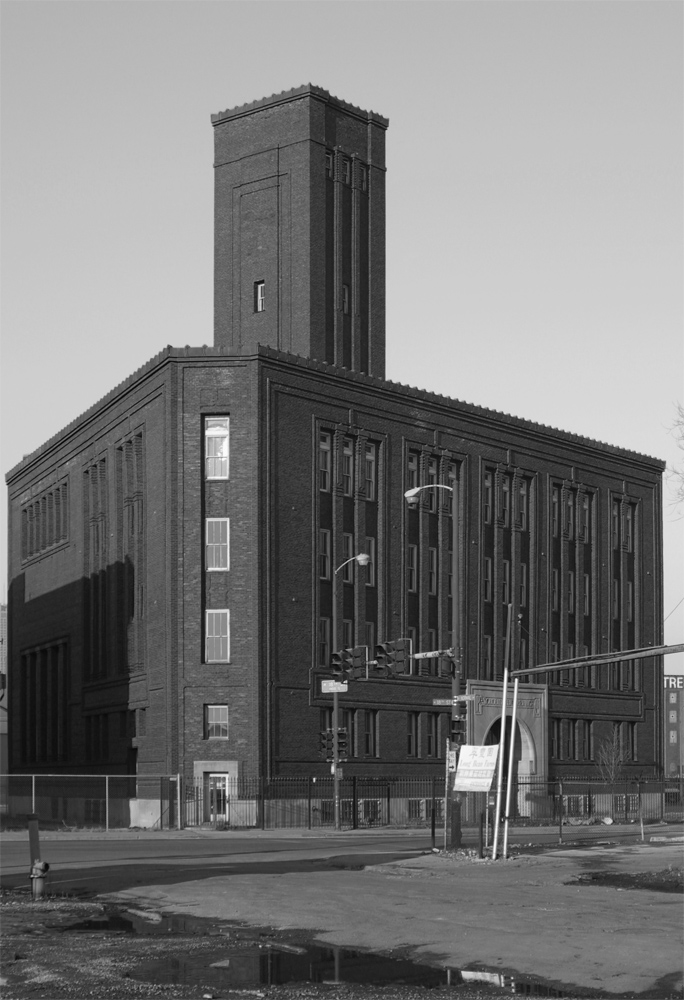
The Schoenhofen Brewery in 2007

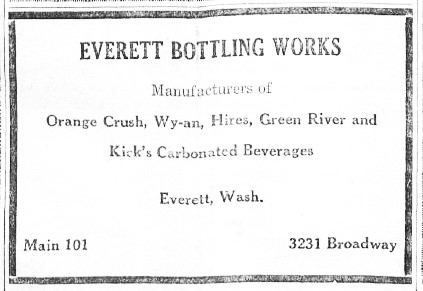
1935 Everett Bottling Works (Washington) products included Green River.

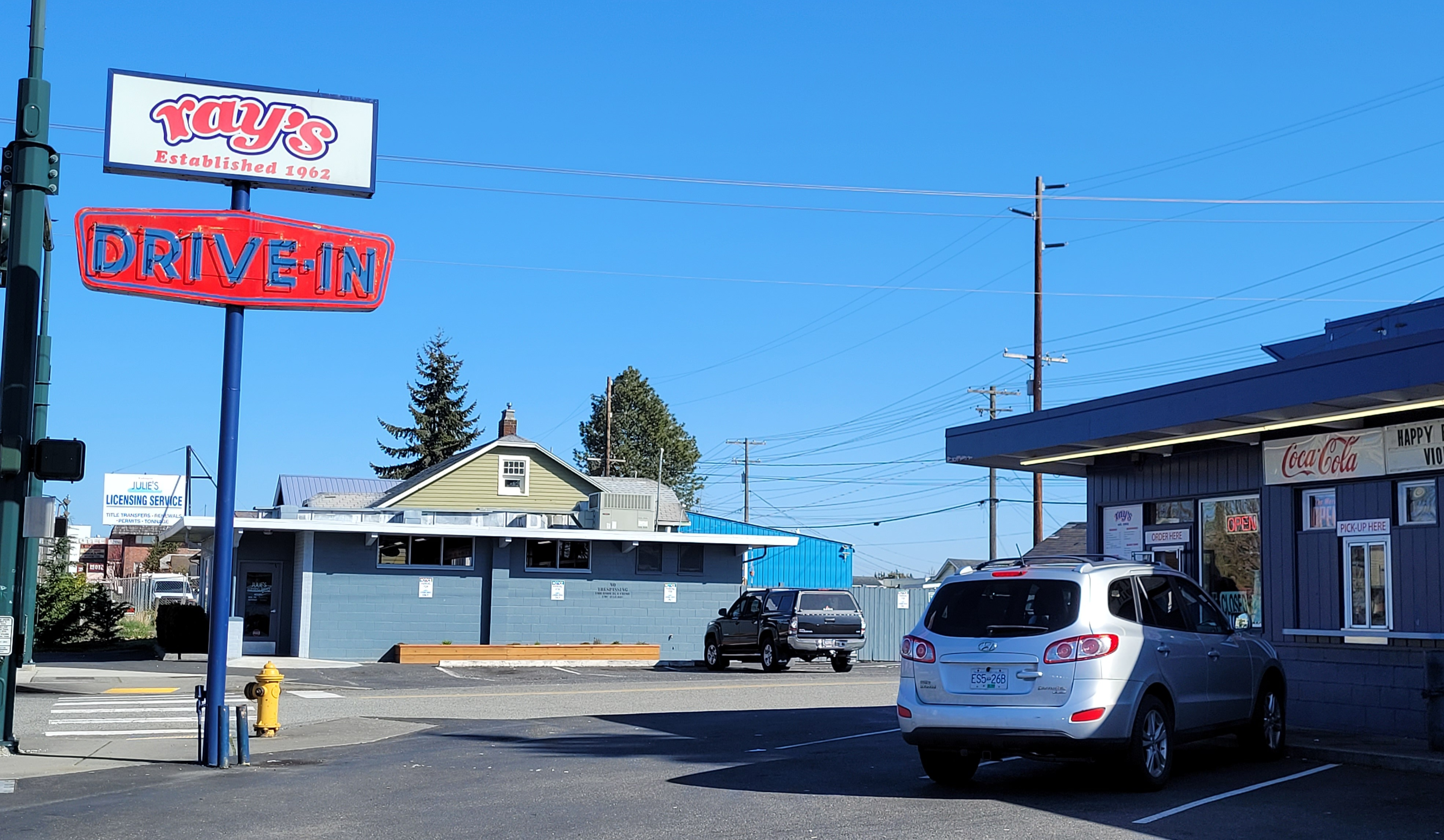
Ray's Drive-In in Everett, Washington, serves Green River milkshakes.

Green River soda was first created in 1916 in Davenport, Iowa, by Richard C. Jones, who owned a local confectionary shop. In 1919, Jones sold his recipe to the Schoenhofen Edelweiss Brewing Company of Chicago. Prior to 1920, the brewery produced the popular Edelweiss beer. Schoenhofen began manufacturing Green River and other soft drinks in order to survive the Prohibition Era. It was also made by the Sweetwater Brewery in Green River, Wyoming. In 1928 Green River soda was produced by Spokane Bottling Works of Spokane, Washington, and in 1935 was of several products produced by the Everett Bottling Works of Everett, Washington, which also produced Orange Crush, Hires and Wy-an sodas. Green River soda's popularity is still remembered in Everett in the form of a "Green River milkshake" at Ray's Drive-In, which opened in 1962.

It was popular as a soda fountain syrup, trailing only Coca-Cola in popularity throughout the Midwest. After Prohibition ended in 1933, the Schoenhofen Brewery continued to manufacture Green River, while resuming the production of alcoholic beverages. The brewery closed in 1950.

The Green River brand continued to be produced by a series of other manufacturers after the closing of Schoenhofen Edelweiss, including Clover Club Beverages of Chicago, which produced Green River in the 1980s. In the 1960s, Green River soda pop was "a nationally known Chicago icon."

By 1992, Green River had shrunk to the point of only being sold in Chicago. According to one source, WIT Beverage Company acquired the brand in 2011, while a vendor indicates it was offering it still via an expanding Clover Club in 2013.

Sprecher Brewery acquired the Green River brand from Wit Beverage in October of 2021. In addition to Sprecher Brewing, Orca Beverage of Mukilteo, Washington, began production in 2025 of Green River soda under its vintage and craft sodas line.

Green River is frequently marketed as a nostalgia item, and its sales increase in March due to the association of the color green with St. Patrick's Day. While not widely commercially available, it can be purchased at some Chicago area restaurants and retailers and Menards as well as ordered directly from Sprecher Brewery and Orca Beverage.

== In popular culture ==
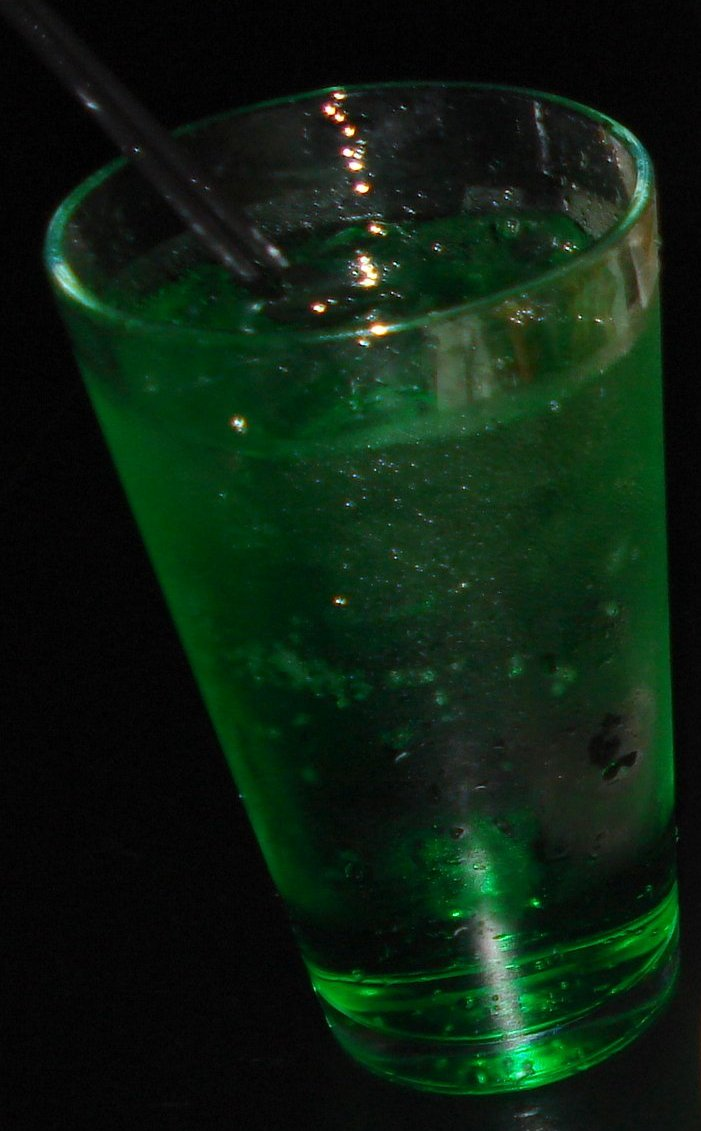
A glass of Green River

Early 20th century entertainer Eddie Cantor, while with the Ziegfeld Follies of 1918, penned a jingle for the soft drink entitled "Green River". The ditty was performed by Cantor and the singing duo Van and Schenck. The refrain was:

For a drink that's fine without a kick,
Try Green River,
It's the only soft drink you should pick,
Try Green River.

The name of the Creedence Clearwater Revival song "Green River", and accordingly the name of the album Green River, were inspired by the drink according to John Fogerty.

In Zen Studios' digital recreation of the Williams pinball tables The Party Zone and The Champion Pub in the game Pinball FX 3, all depictions of beer are replaced with Green River as a precautionary act of censorship to avoid repercussions of having the game's ESRB rating of Everyone 10+ changed.

Green River soda is mentioned in the "Ceres" episode of The Bear.

== See also ==
- Craft soda
