= List of breweries in Wyoming =

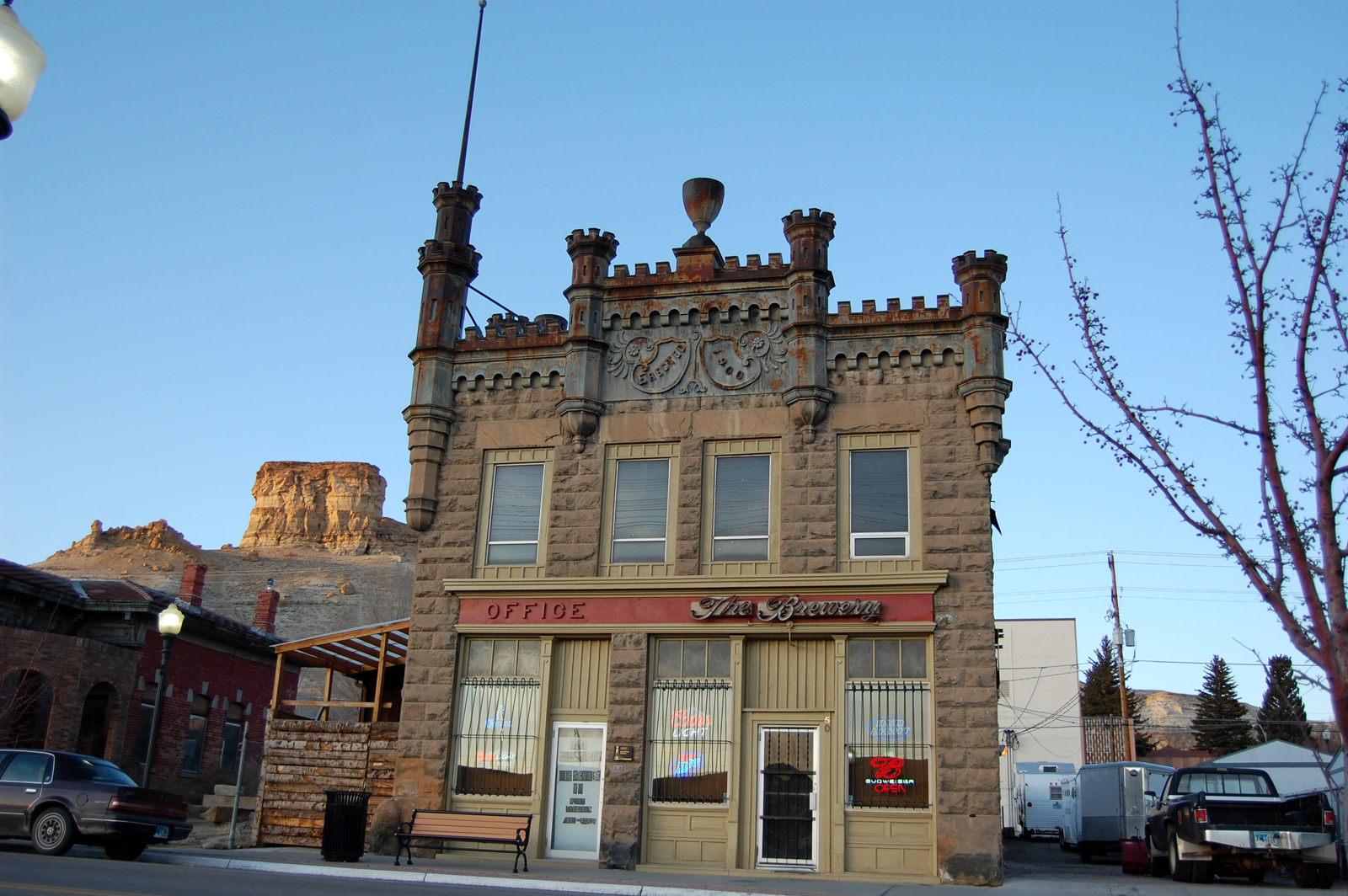
The historic Sweetwater Brewery building in Green River, Wyoming. It was the first brewery in the U.S. state of Wyoming.

The following is a list of Wyoming-based breweries. As of August 2022, Wyoming had 40 active microbreweries. In 2011–2012, craft beer production in Wyoming increased over 32%. In April 2014, The Wyoming Craft Brewers Guild was established by various Wyoming brewers.

== Breweries ==
| Brewery | Location | Description |
|---|---|---|
| Accomplice Beer Company | Cheyenne | Brewpub, opened in 2016 in the Cheyenne train depot, the former location of the Cheyenne Brewing Company |
| Altitude Chophouse & Brewery | Laramie | The company's flagship Tumblewheat beer won a silver medal award at the Great American Beer Festival in 2012 |
| Black Tooth Brewing Co. | Sheridan | The company's Wagon Box Wheat beer won a gold medal award at the Great American Beer Festival in 2012 |
| Clear Creek Brewing Company | Buffalo | |
| Coal Creek Tap | Laramie | |
| Cody Craft Brewing | Cody | Brewery and taproom, opened in 2021. Winner of the 2023 and 2024 Wyoming Craft Brewers Cup for Best Hazy IPA in Wyoming. |
| Danielmarks Brewing Company | Cheyenne | Brewery and taproom, opened in 2016 |
| Freedom's Edge Brewing Company | Cheyenne | Brewery and taproom, opened in 2012, moved to a new location in 2014 |
| Gillette Brewing Co. | Gillette | Opened in 2013. |
| Gruner Brothers Brewing | Casper | Opened in 2018. |
| Lander Brewing Co. | Lander | |
| Library Sports Grille-Brewery | Laramie | |
| Melvin Brewing | Jackson, Alpine | The Thai Me Up Restaurant and Brewery is in Jackson; the production brewery and taproom is in Alpine Acquired by Roadhouse Brewery Group in 2022 |
| Millstone Pizza Company & Brewery | Cody | Opened in 2014 |
| Pat O'Hara Brewing Co. | Cody | |
| Roadhouse Brewing Co. | Jackson | Previously named Q Roadhouse restaurant |
| Snake River Brewing | Jackson | 2x Small Brewery of the Year & 36 Time Medalist at Great American Beer Festival |
| Snowy Mountain Brewing | Saratoga | |
| Ten Sleep Brewing Company | Ten Sleep | Began brewing in October 2013, and has a tap room. |
| Wind River Brewing | Pinedale | |
| WYOld West Brewing Company | Powell | Brewpub opened in 2016 |
| Wyoming State Brewing Company | Casper | |

== Closed breweries ==
| Brewery | Location | Description |
|---|---|---|
| Sweetwater Brewery | Green River | Built in 1900 and presently listed on the U.S. National Register of Historic Places, it was the first brewery in Wyoming. Beer was last brewed there in 1936. |
| Sheridan Brewing Company | Sheridan | Sheridan brewed from 1885 to 1920 and later reopened from 1933 to 1954. It was located at 202 Paul Street. |
| Geyser Brewing Company | Cody | The brewery was added on to Terrace Restaurant |

== See also ==
- List of microbreweries
