= Ale-8-One =

Regional ginger-ale soft drink

Ale 8 One
- Official Ale-8-One Logo
- Type: Soft drink
- Manufacturer: Ale-8-One Bottling Company, Inc.
- Origin: United States
- Introduced: July 13, 1926 (100 years ago)
- Flavor: Ginger ale, lemon-lime
- Variants: Ale-8 Zero Sugar; Caffeine Free Ale-8 Zero Sugar; Cherry; Cherry Ale-8 Zero Sugar; Orange Cream Soda; Strawberry Watermelon; Blackberry; Peach; Roxa-Cola; Roxa-Cola Zero Sugar; Pawpaw Cranberry
- Website: ale8one.com

Ale-8-One pronounced as A Late One, colloquially Ale-8, is a ginger-ale soft drink bottled by the Ale-8-One Bottling Company in Winchester, Kentucky, United States. It is distributed primarily to retailers in Kentucky.

== History ==
The formula for Ale-8-One was developed by soda bottler G. L. Wainscott in the 1920s. Wainscott, who had been in the soda business in Winchester, Kentucky since 1902, had developed Roxa-Kola, his previous flagship product, in 1906. In creating the formula for Ale-8-One, Wainscott drew upon his knowledge of ginger-based recipes acquired in northern Europe.

Wainscott began bottling Ale-8-One in 1926, and sponsored a naming contest for the drink. "A Late One" was chosen as the winning entry, suggesting that the product was "the latest thing" in soft drinks, and shortened to "Ale-8-One".

In 1935, Wainscott purchased a livery stable in Winchester and converted it to a bottling factory to expand his operation. Upon Wainscott's death in 1944, half of his company stock went to his wife; the other half was divided among his employees. When his wife died in 1954, her stock was left to her brother, Frank A. Rogers. Rogers bought the remaining company stock in 1962 and incorporated the Ale-8-One Bottling Company. He named his son, Frank Rogers Jr., manager of the new company.

The Ale-8-One Bottling Company constructed a new plant in Winchester in 1965. It ceased production of Roxa-Kola in 1968 and by 1974, had halted production of all its other drinks to focus on Ale-8-One. The company remains under the control of the Rogers family.

A limited edition reissue of Roxa-Kola was released in November 2023, and re-released for a long term run in 2024.

== Composition ==
The Ale-8-One recipe is a closely guarded family secret. Reportedly, only former company president Frank A. Rogers III and his son, current president Fielding Rogers, know its exact composition. Scientific studies have proven that Ale-8-One has less caffeine than Coca-Cola, Pepsi, or Mountain Dew.

== Variants ==
In 2003, the company announced limited distribution of Diet Ale-8, its first new product since the introduction of the original Ale-8 in 1926. Diet Ale 8, which was renamed Ale-8 Zero Sugar in 2020, contains 44 mg of caffeine and no sugars. The diet variety is sweetened with a mixture of acesulfame potassium and sucralose. Caffeine Free Diet Ale 8 (now Caffeine Free Ale-8 Zero Sugar), sweetened with Splenda, followed in March 2011.

In 2018, Cherry Ale-8 was released. It was first available exclusively in fountain drink form, then it became available in bottles. A zero-sugar version of Cherry Ale-8 became available in 2020. In April 2019, Ale-8-One announced a new orange cream soda flavor to be available in early May of that year. In May 2022, Blackberry Ale-8 was released to the public, in a bottled form. In May 2023, Peach Ale-8 was released as a limited edition. In July 2024, StrawMelon Ale-8 was released as a limited edition. In August 2025, PawPaw Ale-8 was released as a seasonal edition.

== Availability and distribution ==
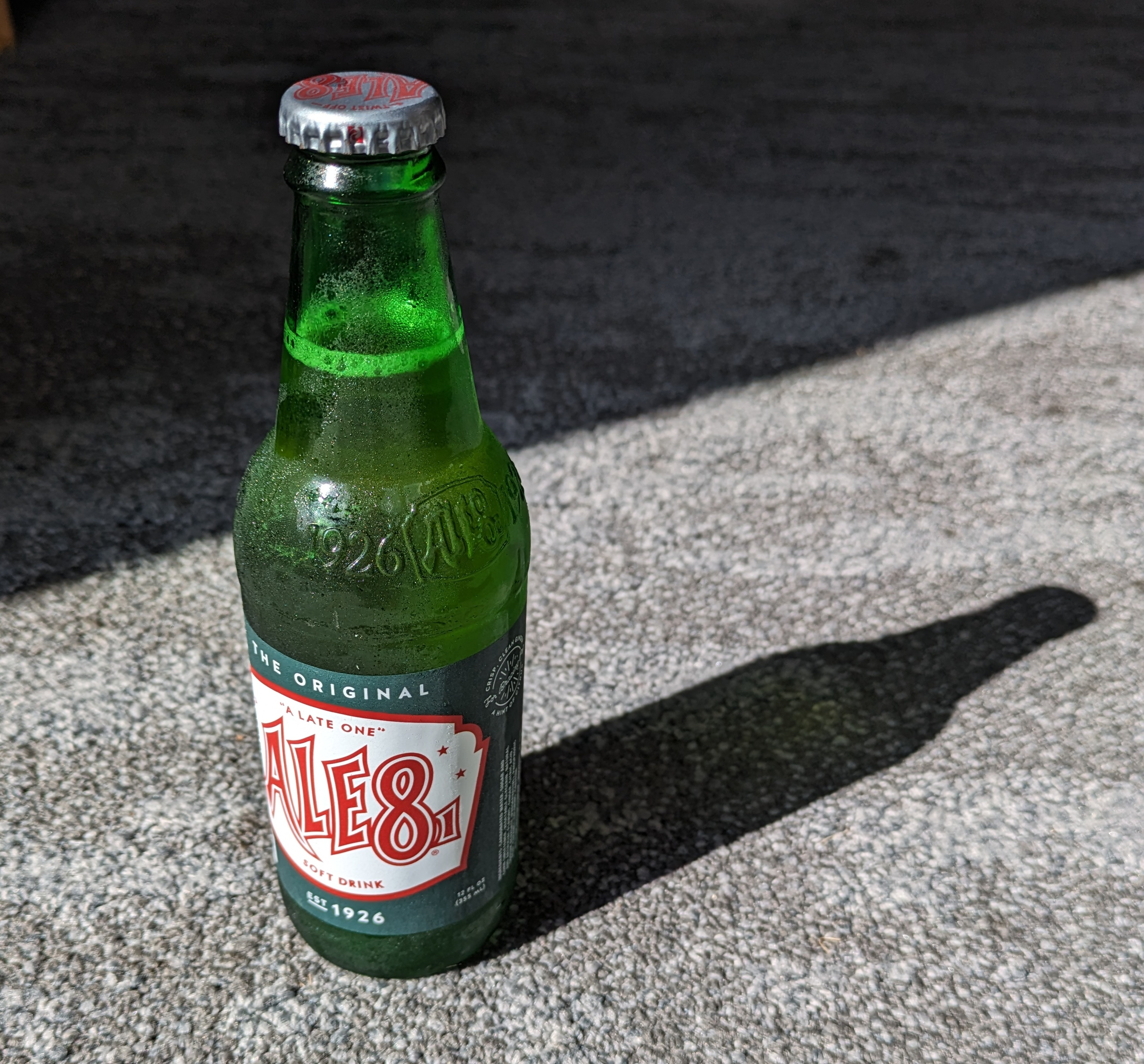
A bottle of Ale-8-One

For much of its history, Ale-8 was only available in central and eastern Kentucky. In April 2001, the Ale-8-One Bottling Company expanded its distribution to areas of southern Ohio and southern Indiana through an agreement with Coca-Cola Enterprises. Later, distribution expanded to East Tennessee and western Virginia. It is also available in some parts of West Virginia.

In July 2015, Ale-8 announced plans to expand distribution into Indianapolis.

=== Nationwide distribution ===
In 2016, Cracker Barrel began distributing the drink nationwide in all of its locations. In 2017, The Fresh Market began distributing Ale-8 and Diet Ale-8 in their stores in the eastern and Midwestern United States.

== Other products ==
In 2006, the Ale-8-One Bottling Company introduced Ale-8-One Salsa, which was available as an experimental product, but became a permanent item at Kroger stores and on the company's online store. The salsa was inspired by a Sullivan University student who won a contest commemorating the company's 80th anniversary by making a salsa dish with Ale-8-One as an ingredient. Shortly after, Ale-8-One Barbecue Sauce was introduced.

== See also ==
- Craft soda
