= Sweetwater Brewery =

- U.S. National Register of Historic Places
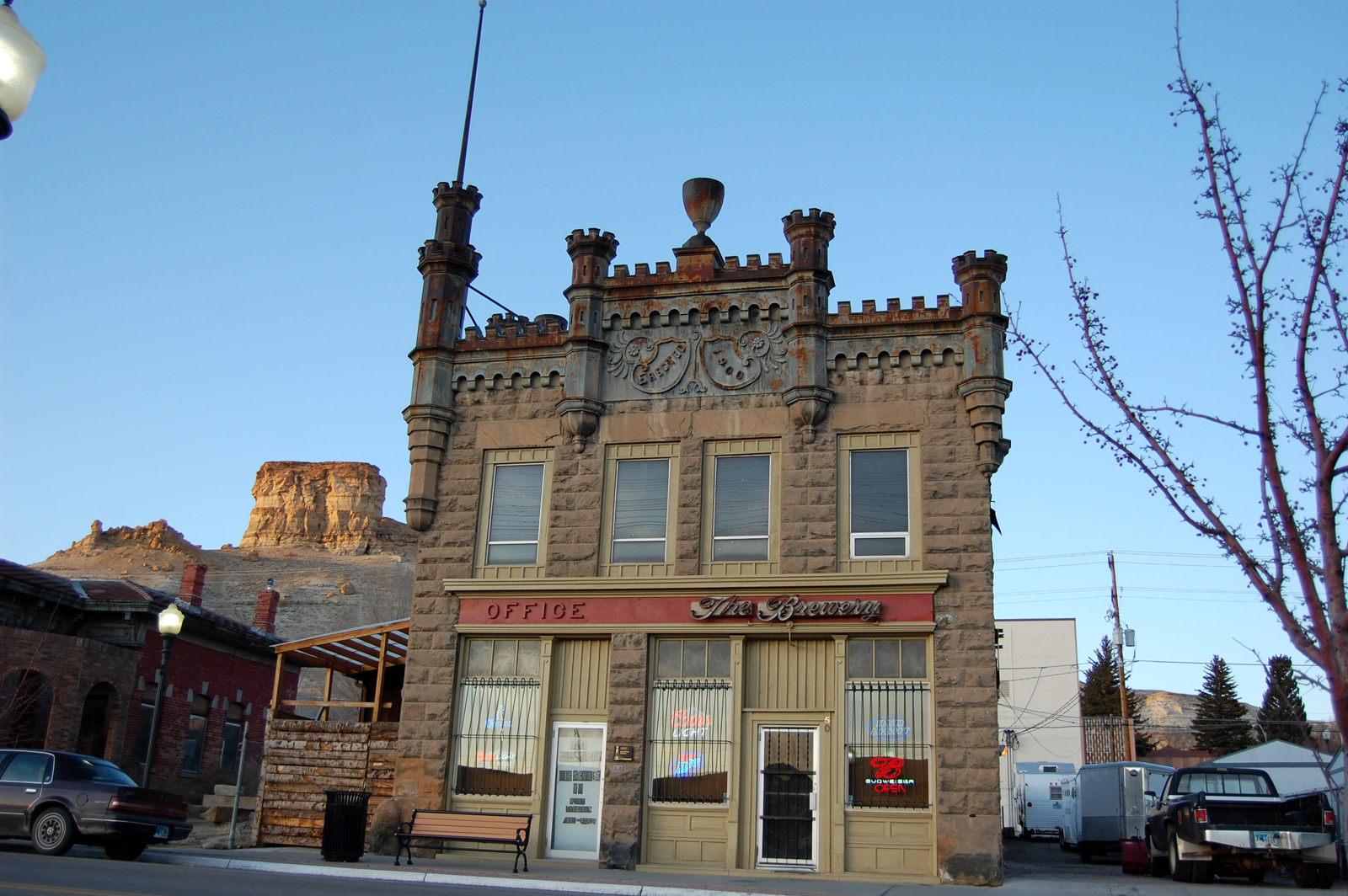

- Location within Wyoming Location within the United States
- Location: 48 W. Railroad Ave., Green River, Wyoming
- Coordinates: 41°31′44″N 109°28′5″W
- Built: 1900
- Architect: Hugo Gaensslen
- NRHP reference No.: 82001838
- Added to NRHP: November 1, 1982

The Sweetwater Brewery, also known as the Green River Brewery, was built in 1900 in Green River, Wyoming. The present structure is the surviving remnant of a three-building complex comprising an office/saloon, engine house, and the present brewery building. It was the first brewery in Wyoming, with operations dating to 1872 when Adam Braun began the business, the first of a series of ethnic German brewers. The brewery was further developed by Otto Rauch and Karl Spinner. The present structure was built by the fourth proprietor, Hugo Gaensslen, a Chicagoan who decorated the building with turrets reminiscent of the Chicago Water Tower.

The two-story building is composed of rock-faced ashlar sandstone, mostly quarried 1.5 miles (2.4 km) away. The fanciful turrets feature mock-medieval features such as merlons and crenels. The largest tower is on the southwest corner and features a flagpole topped by a large ball.

Gaensslen concentrated on brewing, leasing the adjacent saloon to an operator. With the passage of the Volstead Act, brewing stopped and the company's name changed to the Sweetwater Beverage Company, making a non-alcoholic drink named Green River and a near-beer called "Wyoming Beverage". The business did not prosper and failed with the death of Gaensslen in 1931, two years before the end of Prohibition.

In 1936 the closed business was bought by a con man named Tom Flaherty, who made some poor beer and skipped town to Canada. Since that time, no beer has been made in the building, which has housed various commercial businesses. It currently is a local bar, known as "The Brewery".

== See also ==
- List of breweries in Wyoming
- List of defunct breweries in the United States
