= Fritz-kola =

German caffeinated soft drink

Fritz-Kola
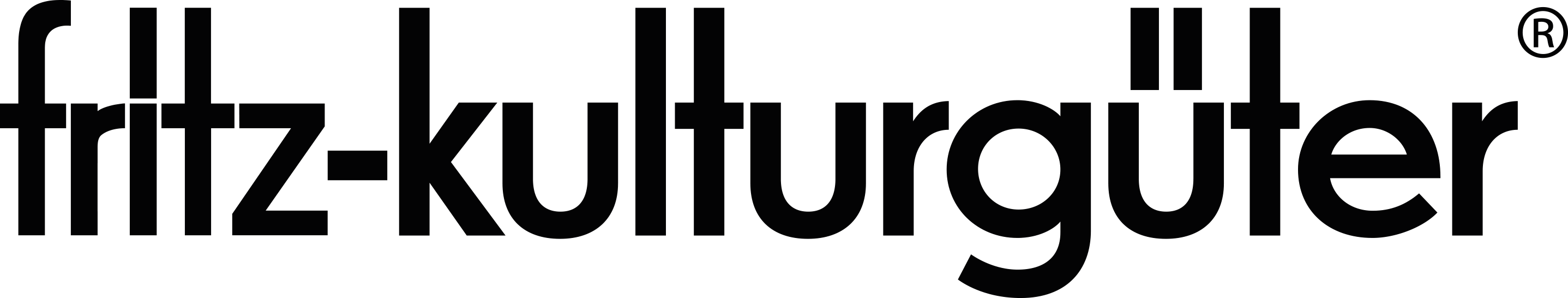
- Type: Cola
- Origin: Hamburg, Germany
- Introduced: February 28, 2003; 23 years ago
- Website: fritz-kola.com/en

Fritz-kola (stylized as fritz-kola) is a soft drink made in Northern Germany and shipped to many nations in the European Union. It has a relatively high caffeine content and is sold in glass bottles with labels which were originally black and white, using the faces of the two founders in the logo.

== History ==
Two students from Hamburg, Lorenz Hampl and Mirco Wiegert, started selling Fritz-kola in 2003. They had a brewery help them develop a cola recipe, choosing to use less sugar and more caffeine (25mg of caffeine per 100ml) than Coke or Pepsi, and adding lemon flavour. They polled people outside a shopping centre to choose the company name. To save money, they used black and white labels and a photoshopped version of pictures of their heads as a logo; they sold the first crates to bars on a returnable basis, and did not establish an office for three years.

Hampl left the business in 2016. As of August 2020, Wiegert heads the company and owns two-thirds of it. The company employs 280 people. Five bottling plants produce the cola, which is sold in a number of European countries. In 2019, its 330ml bottles outsold all brands except Coke. Outside of Germany, Fritz-kola's other major markets are the Netherlands, Poland, Belgium, and Austria. Sales in 2015 were €7.4 million.

== Varieties ==
Through the years Fritz-kola has offered many variants of its cola as well as different kinds of soft drinks. These include:

- Fritz-kola:
  - Fritz-kola
  - Fritz-kola kola-coffee-lemonade
  - Fritz-kola sugarfree
- Fritz-limo:
  - Fritz-limo orangeade
  - Fritz-limo melon
  - Fritz-limo lemonade
  - Fritz-limo apple, cherry and elderberry
- mischmasch kola-orange-lemonade
- Fritz-spritz:
  - Fritz-spritz organic cloudy sparkling apple
  - Fritz-spritz organic sparkling grape
  - Fritz-spritz organic sparkling rhubarb
- fritz-mate (discontinued)

== See also ==
- Craft soda
