= G. E. Fussell =

English agricultural historian

George Edwin Fussell, FRHistS (10 September 1889 – 1 January 1990) was an English agricultural historian.

== Life ==
Fussell was born in Weymouth on 10 September 1889. He was given a job as a boy clerk in the War Office in 1906 and three years later joined the Board of Agriculture and Fisheries. In the 1920s, he worked at the Ministry of Agriculture; here, he published his first scholarly articles, on the history of farm machinery, for the Journal of the Ministry of Agriculture. This began a prolific career as an agricultural historian; he wrote more than 20 books and 600 articles on the topic. At the time, little had been written about the subject and Fussell became its "pioneer", and an authority. He contributed to the journal Agricultural History. He eventually became Librarian to the Ministry of Agriculture and retired in 1949, but continued writing. He helped to establish the British Agricultural History Society in 1952. His contributions to the field were recognised in 1933 when he was elected a Fellow of the Royal Historical Society and in 1970 when the University of Exeter conferred on him an honorary Doctor of Letters degree. He died on 1 January 1990 aged 100; his wife Kathleen Rosemary (née Turner), with whom he co-wrote or co-edited several works, survived him, as did their daughter.

== Selected publications ==
- The Old English Farming Books, vol. 1 (C. Lockwood, 1947)
- Hugh Plat (1600) (Co-edited by G.E. and K. R. Fussell) Delightes for Ladies (London : Crosby Lockwood & Son, 1948)
- The English Rural Labourer (Batchworth Press, 1949).
- More Old English Farming Books (C. Lockwood, 1950).
- The Farmer's Tools (A. Melrose, 1952).
- The English Countryman (A. Melrose, 1953).
- The English Countrywoman (A. Melrose, 1955).
- (Co-authored with K. R. Fussell) The English Dairy Farmer, 1500–1900 (Frank Cass & Co., 1966).
- Farming Technique from Prehistoric to Modern Times (Pergamon Press, 1966).
- The Old English Farming Books, vol. 3 (Pindar Press, 1983).
