= Brooklyn Soda Works =

Brooklyn Soda Works is a small-scale artisanal craft soda company based in Brooklyn, New York owned by Caroline Mak and Antonio Ramos.

== History ==
The company operates out of a commercial kitchen in Bedford-Stuyvesant section of Brooklyn. The drinks are carried by food restaurants such as the Blue Hill Restaurant in Manhattan.

== Beverage flavors ==
The company offers different flavors based on their experimentation, such as cucumber lime sea salt, and watermelon tarragon lemon.
