= Schoenhofen Brewing Company =

Brewery in Chicago, Illinois

- Industry: Beverages
- Founded: 1861, 165 years ago
- Founder: Peter Schoenhofen; Matheus Gottfried
- Defunct: 1951
- Headquarters: 18th Street and Canalport Avenue, Chicago, Illinois, United States
- Area served: Regional
- Products: Beer; Soft Drinks

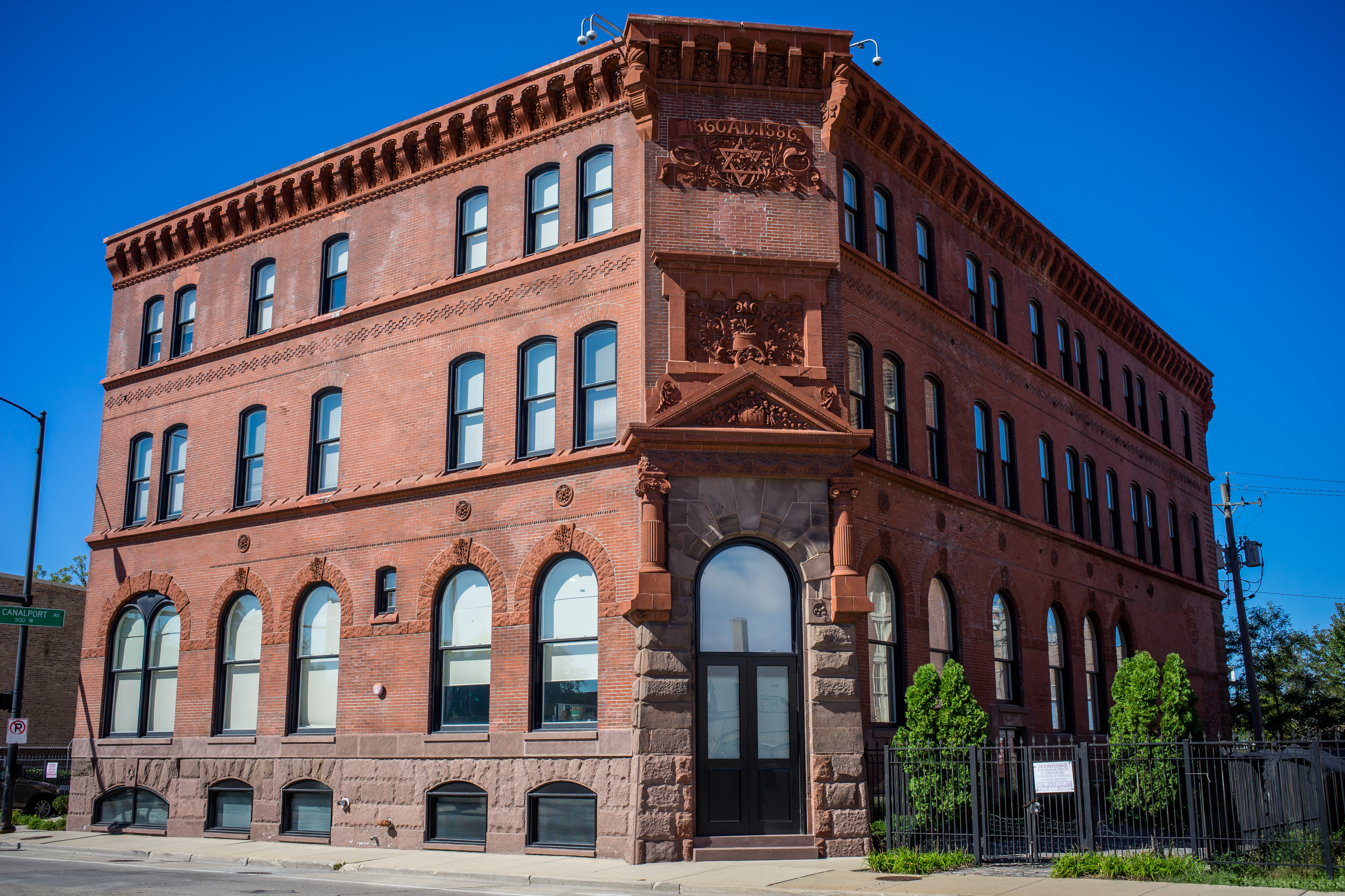
The former Schoenhofen Brewery administration building in 2018

The Peter Schoenhofen Brewing Company was an American brewery established in 1861 by Peter Schoenhofen and Matheus Gottfried in the Pilsen neighborhood of Chicago, Illinois. The company is notable for producing and selling the popular Edelweiss brand of American beer and the Green River brand soft drink.

== History ==
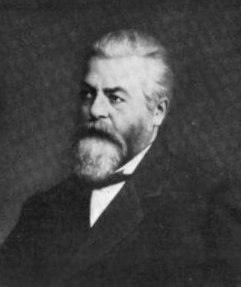
Peter Schoenhofen

In the 1850s, Prussian immigrant Peter Schoenhofen began working in the Illinois brewing trade, first with the Mueller Brothers brewers in Lyons; then with Conrad Seipp in Chicago, driving that brewer's single beer wagon. In 1861, he formed a partnership with Matheus Gottfried to establish a brewery at the intersection of Jefferson and 12th Streets in Chicago. They produced approximately 600 barrels of beer per year until 1867 when Schoenhofen bought out Gottfried, moved production to a newer facility constructed at the intersection of 18th Street and Canalport Avenue, and renamed the company after himself. The next year, output had increased to over 10,000 barrels. Over the following decades, the facility was expanded continuously, culminating in the 1902 construction of the powerhouse building, which was designed by Hugh Garden and made use of a natural spring for brewing water. By 1910, the brewery was producing over a million barrels per year. Edelweiss beer was their most popular brand, and accounted largely for their strong growth.

In 1919, Richard C. Jones, who had developed the Green River brand of soft drink sold the recipe to Schoenhofen Brewing. Schoenhofen began producing the beverage, which became popular and is credited with helping the company survive Prohibition. During Prohibition, certain buildings of the complex were reorganized as grain warehouses to serve the nearby train yards.

After the repeal of Prohibition, Schoenhofen was purchased by the National Brewing Company and resumed producing Edelweiss beer as well as continuing production of Green River. The brewery was purchased again in the late 1940s by Atlas Brewing, who in 1951 ended production of Edelweiss in favor of Drewry's Beer and the Schoenhofen name ceased to exist.

In 1978, the remaining buildings at the site were added to the National Register of Historic Places as the Schoenhofen Brewery Historic District.
