= Seasonal beer =

Beer brewed during or for a particular season

A seasonal beer is a beer that is typically brewed during or for a particular season, holiday or festival period. Many breweries produce seasonal beers. Seasonal beers may be produced when fresh ingredients are available during various seasons, per climatic conditions during the time of the year, and also as a tradition. Furthermore, seasonal beer is produced based upon seasons, holidays, festivals and events.

== By season ==
=== Spring ===
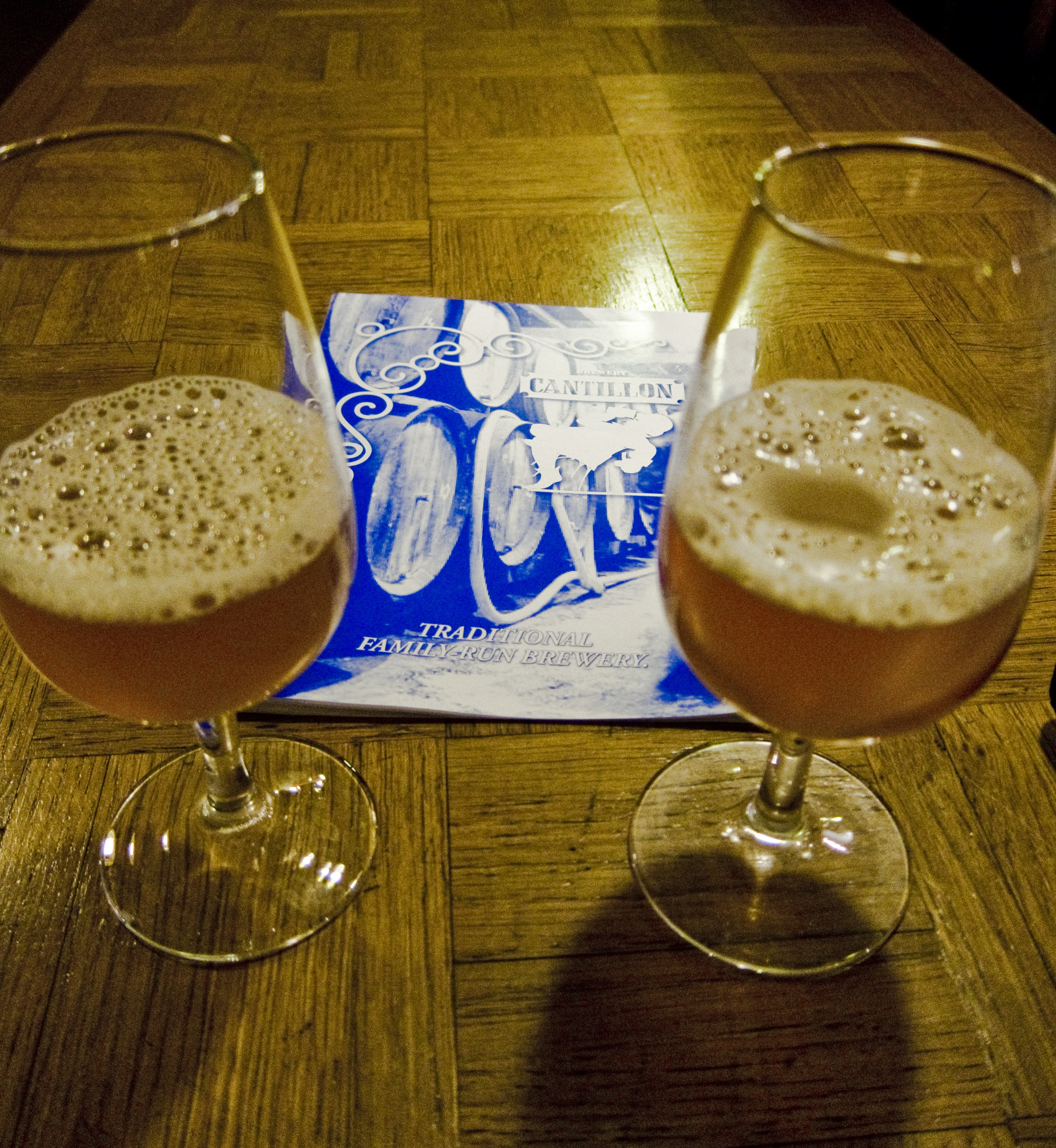
Gueuze lambic beer, produced by Cantillon Brewery

Lambic has been described as a seasonal beer that is prepared during the winter for consumption in spring and summer months. Traditionally, the preparation of lambic includes leaving the wort mixture exposed to wild yeasts. It is also prepared with beer yeast for fermentation and bacteria such as lactobacillus and acetobacter for aging, after which time during the warmer spring and summer seasons, the wild yeasts and souring bacteria in the mix predominantly influence the final product's flavor and characteristics. They are aged in wooden barrels or stainless steel tanks. Lambics are typically liberally hopped as a preservative to control bacteria levels, however the hops are usually aged as to not add too much bitterness. Some varieties are aged for years. They typically have a slight sweetness, along with a distinct sourness.

=== Summer ===
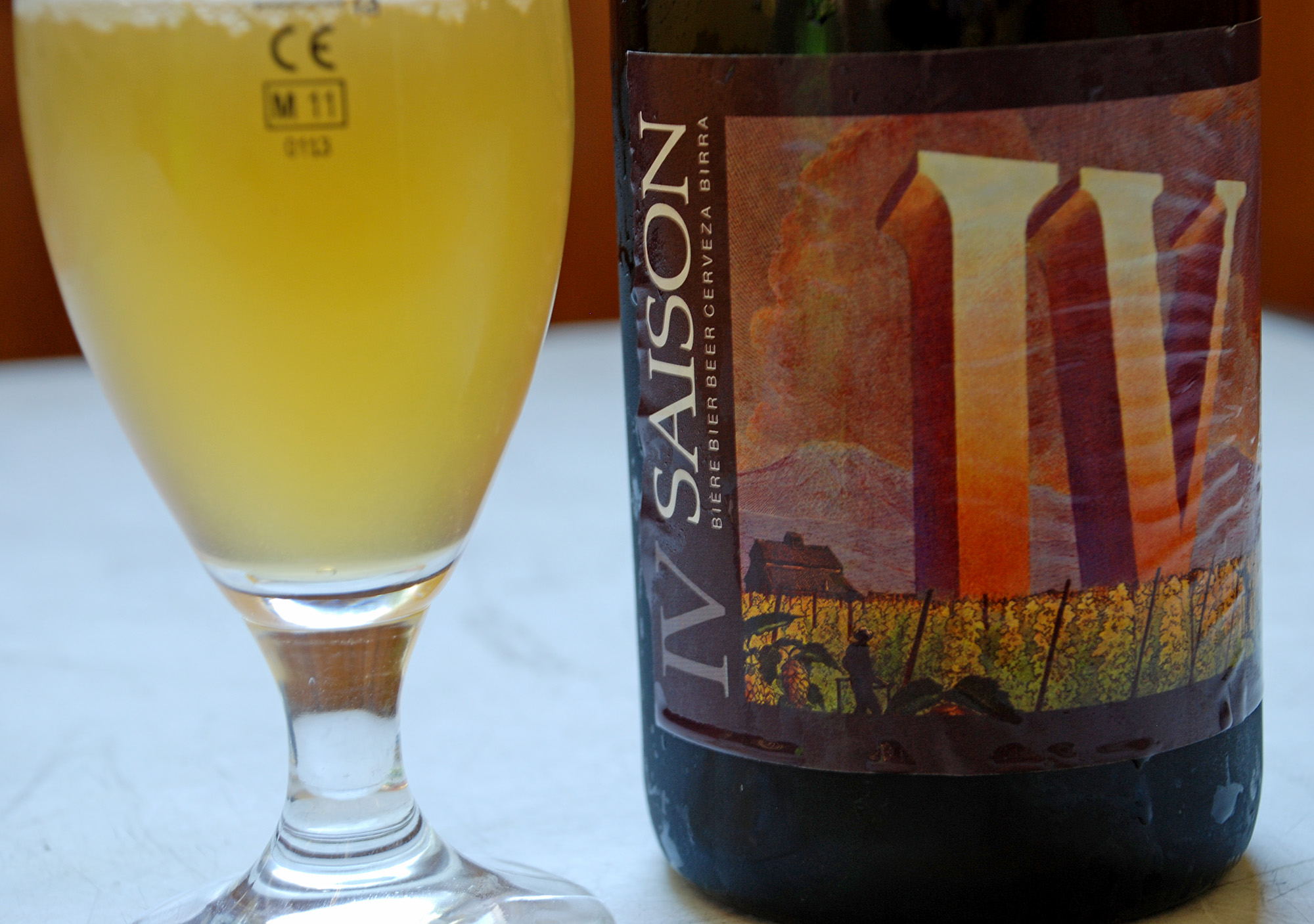
A saison beer

Summer seasonal beers are typically formulated for warmer weather, and are typically light-bodied. They may have citrus or fruity flavor, which may be accented with the use of honey, brewing spices and floral hops. Many summer seasonal beers are ales and wheat ales.

Saison (literally the French translation of season) has been described as a summer seasonal beer. As a beer style, the saison originated from ales brewed during the cooler and less active months in farmhouses in Wallonia, the French-speaking region of Belgium, and then stored for drinking by the farm workers during the summer months. General characteristics include a fruity flavor and smell, light or bitter hoppiness, pale orange body, thick head, and a light- to medium-body.

=== Autumn ===
Autumn seasonal beers may incorporate the use of spices such as cinnamon and nutmeg, which serves to associate the season with the beer's flavor, or to create a "frame of reference unique to that season".

In Germany and the United States, Oktoberfestbier or Märzen, originally produced for the Oktoberfest celebrations held in Munich, are commonly released throughout September and October. Beers served at modern Oktoberfests tend to be lighter lagers, while traditional recipes are amber-colored, dry, and malty.

Bière de Garde (English: "beer for keeping") is a seasonal beer that is traditionally brewed in the Nord-Pas-de-Calais region of France. It is brewed in Autumn, after which it is stored during the winter, to be consumed during the next year. Bière de Garde was originally brewed in farmhouses in the Nord-Pas-de-Calais region. Varieties of Bière de Garde are produced by some American craft brewers. Some of these American varieties have a high alcohol by volume content, ranging from 7-9%.

Pumpkin ale is often brewed as an autumn seasonal beer. Well-known examples include Saint Arnold's Pumpkinator, Shipyard's Pumpkinhead, and Schlafly's Pumpkin Ale.

=== Winter ===
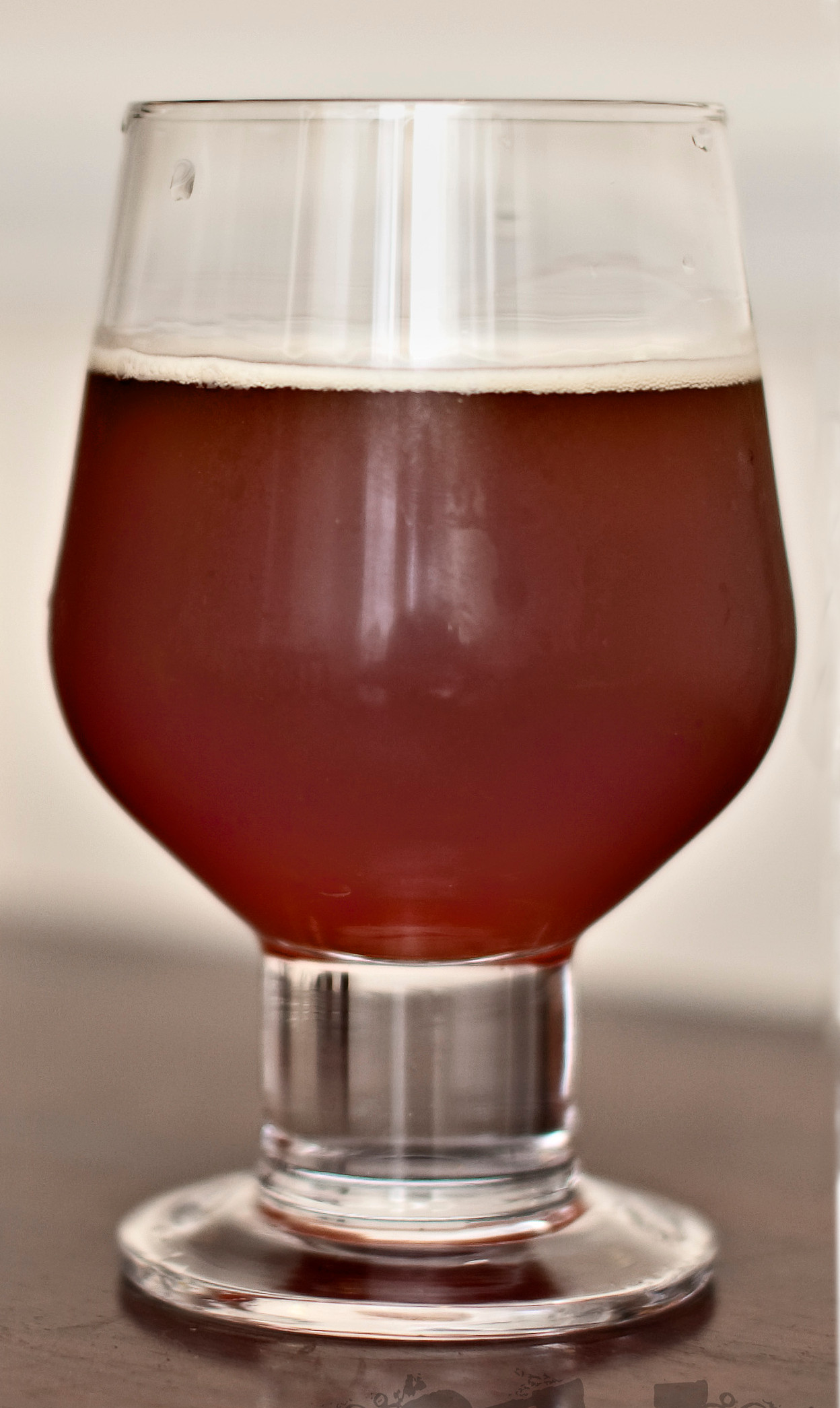
Founders Brewing Company's Curmudgeon Old Ale

Bock was traditionally produced during winter for consumption during either winter or Lent and Easter festivals in the spring.

Winter warmers are a type of winter seasonal beer. These include old ales and mild ales that have been brewed during the winter months. Prior to the times of the Industrial Revolution in the mid-eighteenth century in England, some winter warmers were aged in barrels for months, and even years, which added to their flavor profile. The barrels were typically made from oak. During this time, tannins from the wooden barrels served to add flavor notes to winter warmers, and wild yeasts added a mild sour flavor. Winter warmers also sometimes have spices added for additional flavor and tend to be full-bodied, darker, and malt-driven styles.

Wassail-style beer is sometimes described or categorized as a winter warmer.

== By holiday ==
Seasonal beers historically produced for the Autumn Thanksgiving (harvest festival) and Christmas holy days. Holiday spiced beers may also be brewed with spices and fruits to add flavor.

=== Christmas beer ===
Christmas beer is seasonal beer brewed for consumption during Christmastide in a number of countries. Some varieties of Christmas beer may be strong and spiced with a variety of unusual ingredients. Spices used in Christmas beer varieties includes allspice, cardamom, cinnamon, clove, nutmeg and star anise. Christmas beers are sometimes referred to as winter warmers.

The origin of Christmas beer is typically traced to medieval Scandinavia, where it was brewed for the celebration of the Nativity. The tradition of Christmas beer was carried on through and beyond the Middle Ages by monks who would produce beer for the Christmas season. The addition of spices to Christmas beer occurred in the late 1980s, under the auspices of the Anchor Brewing Company. In the 1990s, similar Christmas beers arose, such as Lichfield's Mincespiced, Blackawton's Winter Fuel, and Swale Christmas Spice.

== By festival ==
=== Oktoberfest ===
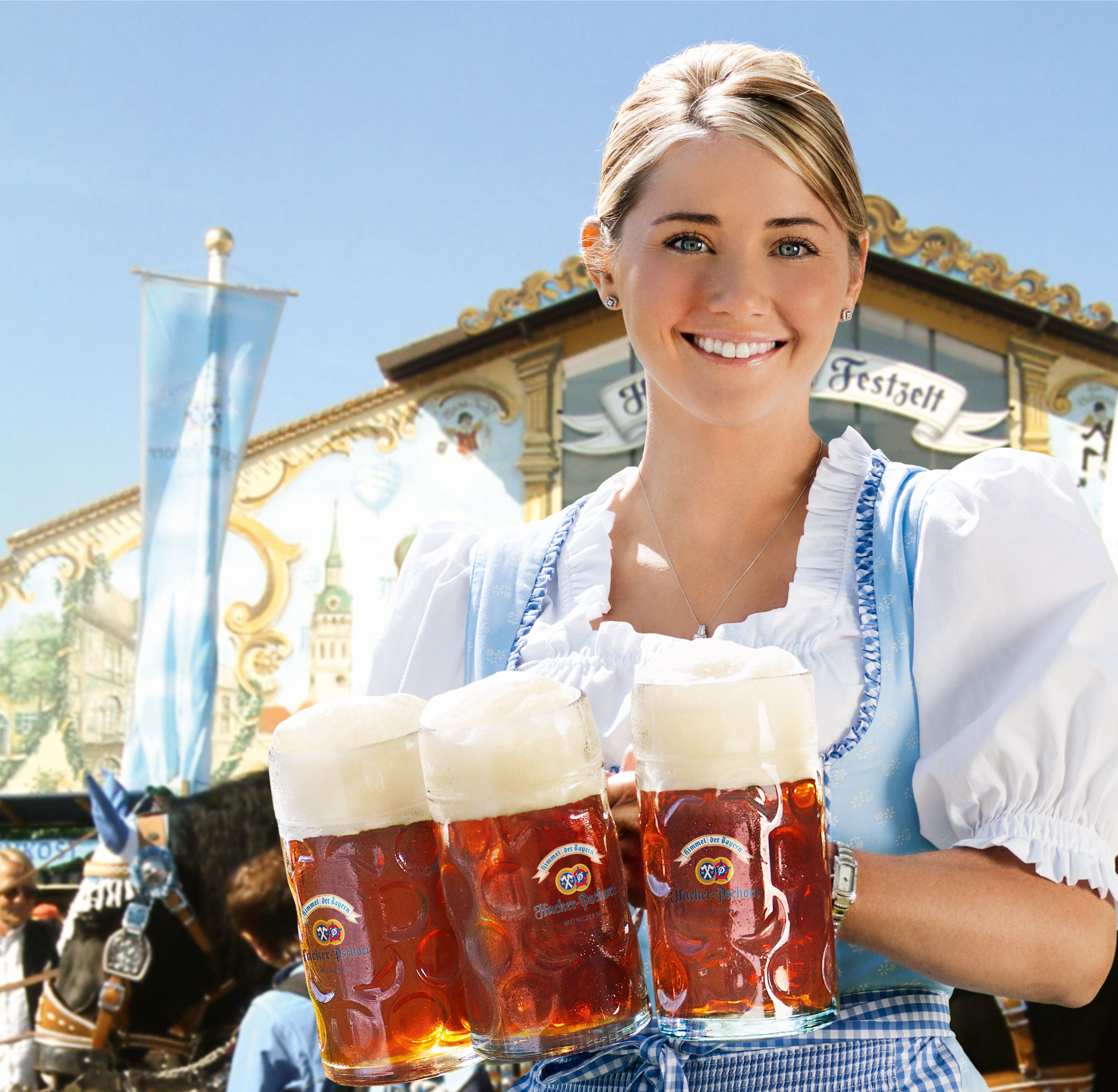
A waitress with Hacker-Pschorr, one of the traditional Oktoberfestbiers brewed for Oktoberfest festival. She wears a dirndl, a traditional women's dress of Bavaria.

Some seasonal beers are produced for the Oktoberfest festival. Oktoberfest seasonal beers include those named and labeled as "Oktoberfest" (e.g. Oktoberfestbiers), ales, spiced ales, pumpkin ales, and others. Oktoberfestbiers are the beers that have been served at the festival since 1818, and are supplied by six breweries: Spaten, Löwenbräu, Augustiner-Bräu, Hofbräu-München, Paulaner and Hacker-Pschorr.

== See also ==
- Experimental beer
- List of beer styles

== Bibliography ==
- Mosher, R.; Koch, G. (2015). Beer for All Seasons: A Through-the-year Guide to What to Drink and When to Drink It. Storey Publishing, LLC. ISBN 978-1-61212-347-9.
- Crouch, A. (2010). Great American Craft Beer: A Guide to the Nation's Finest Beers and Breweries. Running Press. p. 189. ISBN 978-0-7624-4160-0.
