= Delightes for Ladies =

1600 book by Hugh Plat

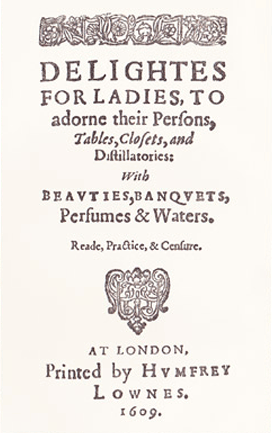
Title page of the 1609 edition of Sir Hugh Plat's Delightes for Ladies

Delightes for Ladies is a book of recipes and household hints for women, written by Sir Hugh Plat (perhaps best remembered for Floreas Paradise) and published in London in 1600 by Peter Short. Its full title is Delightes for ladies: to adorn their persons, tables, closets, and distillatories with beauties, banquets, perfumes and waters. A successful book in its day, some of the recipes have survived to be in relatively common use even 400 years later, in particular the various mixed alcoholic beverages.

== Modern editions and references ==
Delightes for Ladies has not been frequently reprinted. However, a few printings were made in the early 1900s by Crosby Lockwood & Son Ltd, a London publisher. These printings featured a new introduction.

Delights for Ladies was reprinted in the United States by Trovillion Private Press in 1939 and a second limited edition printing of 498 copies took place by the same publisher in the summer 1942 on W.& A. Ash-White Arak paper at the Sign of the Silver Horse, which is at Herrin in Illinois, U.S.A. for Violet and Hal W. Trovillion with all copies signed, numbered and type distributed. These printings featured the addition of a glossary and table.

- Delightes for Ladies was edited into A Collection of Medieval and Renaissance Cookbooks, a compendium compiled by Duke Cariadoc of the Bow and The Duchess Diana Alena, published in 1991.
- An essay on Delightes for Ladies by garden historian Malcolm Thick entitled "A Close Look at the Composition of Sir Hugh Plat’s Delightes for Ladies" was published in The English Cookery Book - Historical Essays (ISBN 1-903018-36-6)
- A 1948 edition was produced by the husband and wife team of George E. and Kathleen R. Fussell: Platt, Hugh (eds George E. Fussell, and Kathleen R. Fussell). Delightes for Ladies, Etc. London : Crosby Lockwood & Son.'
