= Craft soda =

Soft drink that is produced in small quantities from natural ingredients

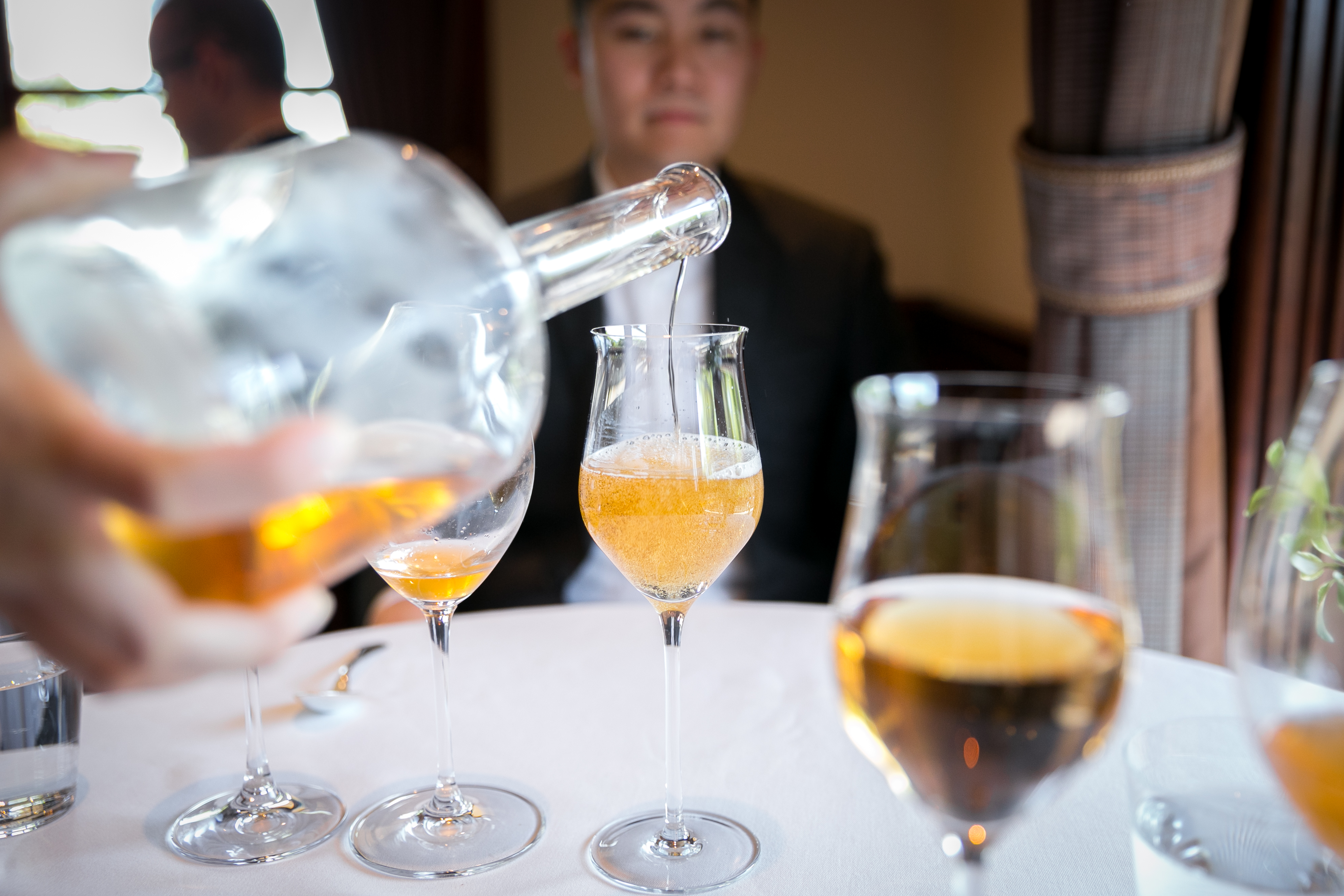
Hand-crafted cream soda

Craft soda is a soft drink that is produced in small quantities from natural ingredients. Craft soda is in most cases made with sweeteners other than sucrose (sugar) or high-fructose corn syrup and contains sparing amounts of preservatives. Craft soda is often innovative in terms of raw materials and flavors.

Some of the literature adds that craft soda producers need to be authentic and small, or even local market only, and independent of major soft drink companies. Still, those big companies are trying to capitalize on the popularity of these types of drinks with craft soda-like products.

Craft soda is a certain trend in the U.S., with a market share of 1% in 2015, but in 2018 it also became noticeable in the Netherlands and Belgium. An American market researcher estimated the world market value for craft soda in 2016 at USD 537.9 million and expected sales in this segment to increase sharply.

== Small quantities ==
Craft soda is typically associated with small quantities that are sometimes only sold locally. The German Fritz-kola started out in Hamburg in this manner, but is now sold throughout Germany and shipped to many nations throughout Europe.

There are a wide variety of small brands in the US, often sold locally or within one state. Occasionally such a brand reaches a larger market, such as Ozark Mountain. Whether such expansion occurs is highly dependent on whether or not a local brand is picked up by larger distributors, such as retail chains.

== Notable producers ==
For much of its history, Ale-8-One in Winchester, Kentucky, established in 1926, was only available in central and eastern portions of Kentucky. In April 2001, the Ale-8-One Bottling Company expanded its distribution to areas of southern Ohio, southern Indiana, through an agreement with Coca-Cola Enterprises. Later, distribution to eastern Tennessee and far western Virginia was added. It is also available in some parts of West Virginia.

Brooklyn Soda Works is a small-scale artisanal craft soda company based in Brooklyn, New York that operates out of a commercial kitchen in Bedford-Stuyvesant section of Brooklyn.

Fordham & Dominion Brewing Company is a brewery in Dover, Delaware that produces a line of craft sodas in addition to its beer production.

Sprecher Brewery is a brewery in Glendale, Wisconsin that produces its own line of beers, craft sodas and flavored malt beverages. In October 2021, the company acquired the Chicago-based WBC and Green River craft soda brands.

Bickford's Australia is Longstanding South Australian brand with a craft-style soda line.

== See also ==
- Artisanal food
- Craft brewery and microbrewery
