= Hugh Plat =

English author and inventor (1552–1608)

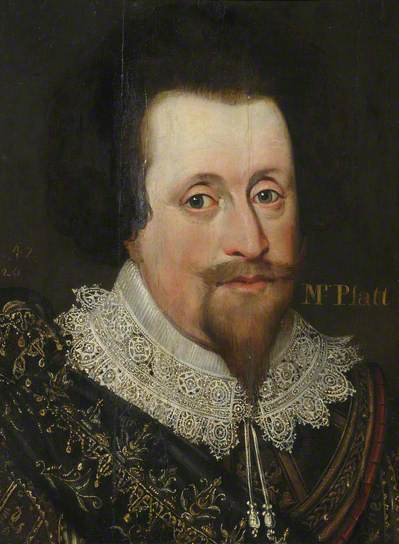
Sir Hugh Plat

Sir Hugh Plat (1552–1608) was an English writer on agriculture and inventor, known from his works The Jewell House of Art and Nature (1594) and his major work on gardening Floraes Paradise (1608).

== Biography ==
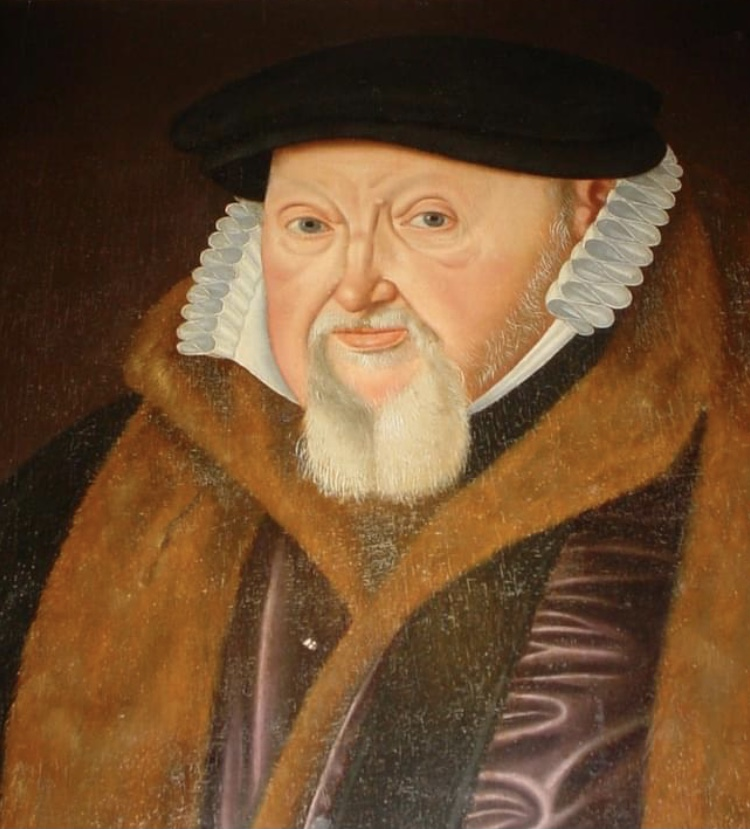
Platt’s father, Richard Platt

Hugh Plat was born in the spring of 1552, and baptised at St. James's, Garlickhythe, on 3 May 1552. He was third son, the eldest surviving son, of Richard Platt (1525–1600), a London brewer who ran the Old Swan brewery in James Street, London. His father owned property in St Pancras, London, bequeathed much of it to the foundation and endowment of a free grammar school and six almshouses at Aldenham, Hertfordshire, and was buried at St. James's, Garlickhythe, on 28 November 1600. Hugh's mother, Alice, was daughter of John Birtles, of Birtles, Cheshire. Plat matriculated as a pensioner of St John's College, Cambridge, on 12 November 1568 and he graduated as a Bachelor of Arts in 1572. Soon afterwards he became a member of Lincoln's Inn.

He resided from 1594 at Bishop's Hall, Bethnal Green, later moving to the neighbouring Kirby's Castle. Both at Bethnal Green and in St Martin's Lane. he maintained gardens, where he conducted horticultural and agricultural experiments. For research, he often visited Sir Thomas Heneage's estate at Copt Hall, Essex, and other large properties. He learned metallurgy from blacksmiths, and worked with gardeners and farmers to gather information on horticulture and agriculture.

In consideration of his services as inventor, Plat was knighted by James I at Greenwich on 22 May 1605.

=== Family and legacy ===
Plat married twice. His second wife, Judith, daughter of William Albany of London, was buried in Highgate Chapel, 28 January 1636. Plat left two sons and three daughters by his second marriage, and other children by his first. William, the fourth son of his second marriage, was buried in Highgate Chapel on 11 November 1637, beneath an elaborate tomb.

He left land to St John's College, Cambridge, where he had been educated as a fellow-commoner. In 1858 William Platt's estate was merged in the general property of the college, and the three Platt fellowships, which then represented the endowment, became ordinary foundation fellowships.

== Work ==
Throughout his lifetime, Plat published ten books based on his personal research and his studies of artisans. He also left behind a volume of handwritten notes that credited the people who helped him with his studies.

=== Early works, 1572-92 ===
Amply provided for by his father, he devoted his early years to writing. In 1572 he made his first appearance in print as the author of 'The Floures of Philosophie, with Pleasures of Poetrie annexed to them, as wel pleasant to be read as profitable to be followed of all men; dedicated to Anne Dudley, Countess of Warwick. 'The Floures of Philosophie' comprises 883 short sentences from Seneca; 'The Pleasures of Poetry' is a collection of miscellaneous poems. This work was followed by a similar undertaking, entitled 'Hvgonis Platti armig. Manuale sententias aliquot Diuinas et Morales complectens partim è Sacris Patribus, partim è Petrarcha philosopho et Poeta celeberrimo decerptas,' London, 1584; new edit. 1594.

Plat developed an interest in natural science: mechanical inventions, domestic economy—and especially in agriculture, to which he devoted most of his later life. He corresponded with lovers of gardening and agriculture, and investigated the effects of various manures.

In 1592 Plat exhibited to some privy councilors and chief citizens of London a series of mechanical inventions, and next year printed, as a broad-sheet, some account of them in 'A brief Apologie of certen new Inventions completed by H. Plat' (licensed to Richard Field in 1592).

=== The Jewell House of Art and Nature, 1594 ===
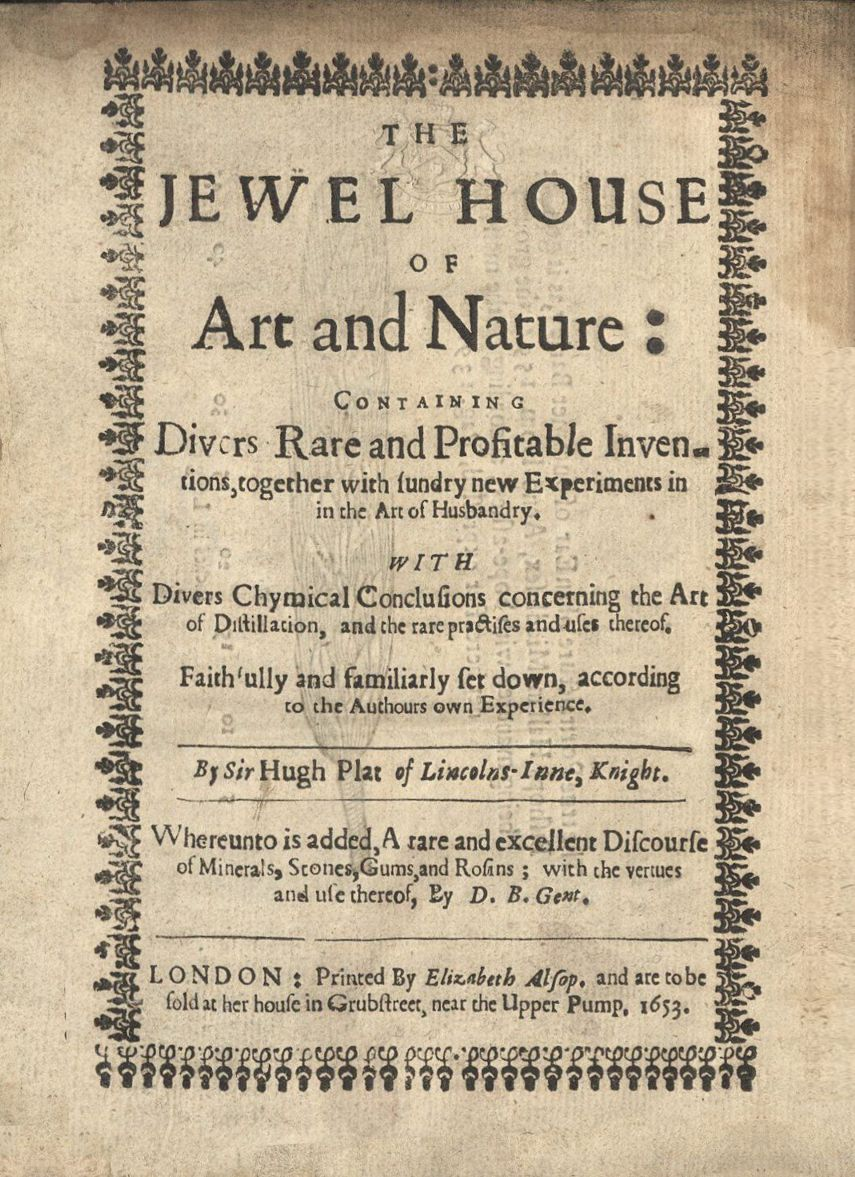
The Jewell House of Art and Nature, title page 1653

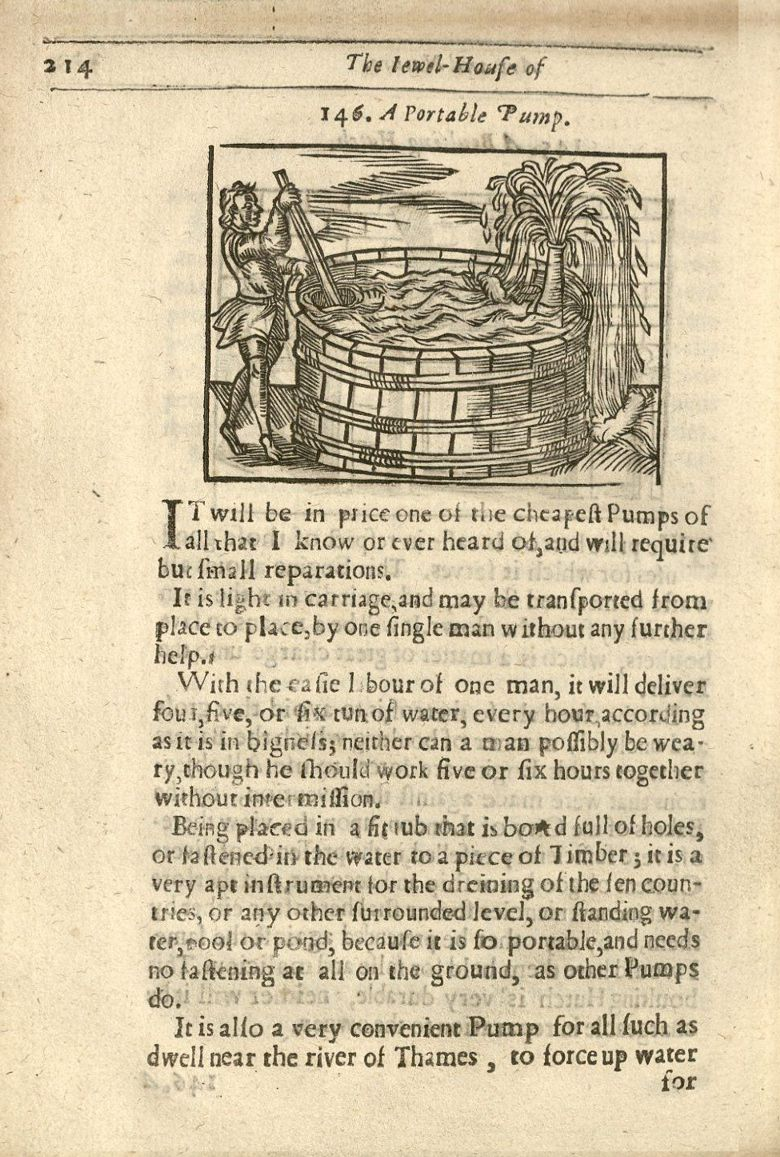
The Jewell House of Art and Nature, 1653, p. 214

In 1594 there appeared 'The Jewell House of Art and Nature, conteining divers rare and profitable Inventions, together with sundry new Experiments in the Art of Husbandry, Distillation and Moulding. By Hugh Platte of Lincolnes Inn, Gent.,' London, 1594; dedicated to Robert Devereux, 2nd Earl of Essex. The volume consists of five tracts with separate title-pages, viz.:

1. 'Divers new Experiments;'
2. 'Diverse new Sorts of Soyle not yet brought into any Publique Use;'
3. 'Chimical Conclusions concerning the Art of Distillation;'
4. 'Of Moulding, Casting Metals;'
5. 'An offer of certain New Inventions which the Author proposes to Disclose upon reasonable Considerations.'

The second of these tracts, which was also issued separately, contains notes by Plat on manures, and the last tract deals with miscellaneous topics, like the brewing of beers without hops, the preservation of food in hot weather and at sea, mnemonics, and fishing. Another edition appeared in 1613, and a revised edition, dedicated to Bulstrode Whitelocke, was prepared in 1653 by 'D. B.' (i.e. Arnold de Boate), who added 'A Discourse on Minerals, Stones, Gums, and Rosins.'

=== More works, 1595-1603 ===
In 1595 Plat gave further results in 'A Discoverie of certain English Wantes which are royally supplied in this Treatise. By H. Plat, of Lincolnes Inne, Esquire,' London 1595 (reprinted in the Harleian Miscellany, vol. ix.). In the same year he issued 'Sundrie New and Artificiall Remedies against Famine. Written by H. P., Esq., upon thoccasion of this present Dearth,' London; new edit. 1596; and his 'Newfounde Art of Setting of Corne' appeared about the same time without date. Other editions followed in 1600 and 1601.

Plat collected recipes for preserving fruits, distilling, cooking, housewifery, cosmetics, and the dyeing of hair. Much of the information was already in his 'Jewell-house.' A more complete work was Delights for Ladies. The first part of the volume reappeared posthumously as 'A Closet for Ladies and Gentlemen, on the art of Preseruing, Conserving, and Candying. With the manner how to make diverse kinds of Syrupes: and all kinde of Banquetting Stuffes,' London, 1611.

In 1603 Plat gave an account of an invention of cheap fuel—i.e. coal mixed with clay and other substances, and kneaded into balls—in a tract called 'Of Coal-Balls for Fewell wherein Seacoal is, by the mixture of other combustible Bodies, both sweetened and multiplied,' London, 1603. Richard Gosling reissued in 1628 an account of Plat's device, and developed it further in his 'Artificial Fire,' 1644.

=== Floraes Paradise, 1608 ===
His major work on gardening appeared in 1608, as 'Floraes Paradise beautified and adorned with sundry sortes of delicate Fruits and Flowers ... with an offer of an English Antidote ... a Remedy in violent Feavers and intermittent Agues.' The preface is dated from 'Bednal Green, 2 July 1608.' An appendix of 'new, rare, and profitable inventions' describes among other things, Plat's fireballs and his experiments in making wine from grapes grown at Bethnal Green.

In his description of gardening experiments, Plat states the name of his informant in all cases where he had not done the work himself. He quotes repeatedly Mr. Andrew Hill, Mr. Pointer of Twickenham, 'Colborne,' and Parson Simson. 'Floraes Paradise' was reissued with some omissions and rearrangements by Charles Bellingham, who claimed relationship with Plat, in 1653, with a dedication to Francis Finch. It then bore the title 'The Garden of Eden; or an accurate Description of all Flowers and Fruits now growing in England. ... By that learned and great observer, Sir Hugh Plat, Knight,' London, 1653, called the fourth edition; another edition, 1659; 5th ed. 1660. Bellingham issued a second part drawn from Plat's unpublished notes in 1660, and both were issued together in 1675, in a so-called sixth edition. Another edition followed in the year 1685.

Plat left unpublished notes and tracts on scientific topics. John Evelyn sent to Dr. Wotton in 1696 'A Short Treatise concerning Metals' by Plat.

== Full list of works by Sir Hugh Plat ==
Books and pamphlets by Sir Hugh Plat (with some later editions).

- The Floures of Philosophie, 1572, intro. Richard J. Panofsky, New York, USA, 1982.
- A Briefe Apologie of Certaine New Inventions, 1593.
- The Jewell House of Art and Nature, 1594.
- Diverse new sorts of Soyle not yet brought into publique use, 1594.
- A Discoverie of Certaine English Wants, 1595.
- Sundrie new and Artificiall remedies against Famine. Written by H.P. Esq. upon thoccasion of this present Dearth, 1596.
- The new and admirable Arte of setting of Corne, 1600.
- Delightes for Ladies, 1602, 1628; also Fussell, G.E., & K.R. Fussell, eds., Delightes for Ladies, 1948.
- A new, cheape and delicate Fire of Cole-balles, 1603.
- Certaine philosophical preparations of foode and beverage for sea-men, nd [c. 1607].
- Floraes Paradise, 1608.
- The Garden of Eden, 1653.
- The Second part of the garden of Eden, 1675.
