= Bluenose (disambiguation) =

Bluenose or Blue nose may refer to:

- Bluenose, a Canadian racing fishing schooner built in 1921
- Bluenose II, replica of the original fishing schooner, built in 1963
- Bluenose one-design sloop, created by the designer of the Bluenose schooner
- MV Bluenose, a CN Marine ferry built in 1955 and scrapped in 2000
- Flying Bluenose, a Dominion Atlantic Railway train from 1891 to 1936
- Bluenose (postage stamp), a 1929 postage stamp issued in Canada
- Blue Nose, a type of American Pit Bull Terrier known for its blue coat
- Bluenose, one of the minor tugboat characters in TUGS
- Bluenose warehou, bluenose sea bass, or bluenose, a fish from the Southern Ocean
- Bluenose cod, an Australian freshwater fish
- Blue-nosed bream, an Australian fish
- The Blue Noses Group, Russian artists group
- Bluenose, a Stan Rogers song from the 1978 album: Turnaround

Slang

- Bluenose, a Rangers F.C. fan
- Bluenose, a Birmingham City F.C. fan
- Bluenose, or Bluenoser, a nickname for a person from the Canadian province of Nova Scotia
- Bluenose, American slang expression for a member of the Church of Scotland, recorded since 1698 (Historical Dictionary of American Slang)
- Bluenose, American slang expression from 19th century onward for someone excessively prudish
- Blue Nose, a Line-crossing ceremony for US sailors who cross the Arctic Circle on board a naval vessel
- The Blue-nosed Bastards of Bodney, the nickname of the World War II 352nd Fighter Group, US Army Air Force, from the identifying markings of their aircraft.
