= Martin Welch =

Martin Leander Welch (1864–1935) was a fishing schooner captain out of Gloucester, Massachusetts. He was captain of the Esperanto in 1920 when it defeated the Canadian schooner Delawana in the first International Fishing Schooner Championship Races in Halifax, Nova Scotia.

Born in Digby, Nova Scotia, he moved to Gloucester in 1880, where he commanded the schooners Lucille, Titania, Lucania, Navahoe, Killarney, Benjamin A. Smith, Esperanto, Elsie, and the motor sailer Thelma.

He died in Gloucester in 1935.
