= Wallace R. MacAskill =

Canadian photographer

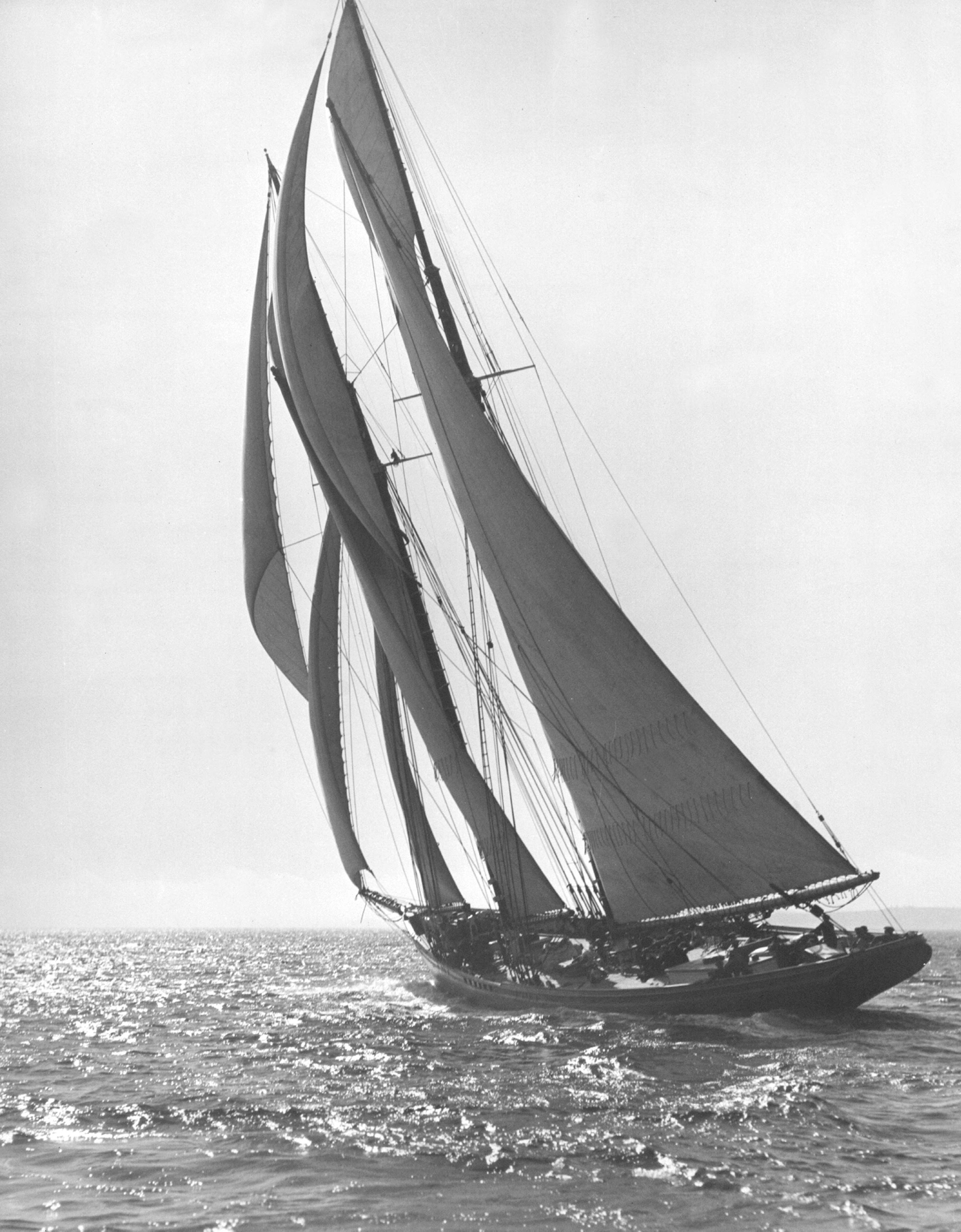
1921 photograph of Bluenose by MacAskill

Wallace Robinson MacAskill (1887–25 January 1956) (Note: The National Gallery of Canada gives a birth date of 1890.), better known as W. R. MacAskill, was a Canadian photographer known for his seascapes and depictions of ships. He is particularly recognized for his photographs of the Bluenose, two of which were used on the Bluenose postage stamp in 1929.

MacAskill was born and raised in the seaside town of St. Peter's, Nova Scotia, where he learned to sail as a young child. At 17, he moved to New York to attend the Wade School of Photography. After graduating in 1907, he moved back to St. Peters' and opened a photography studio. He would later work in Glace Bay and in Halifax. Alongside his photography career, MacAskill took part in recreational sailing and yacht racing. In 1924, his work was exhibited at the Royal Photographic Society. In 1926, he married Elva Abriel, who was also a professional photographer. MacAskill published two books of photography: Out of Halifax in 1937 and Lure of the Sea in 1951. He was elected a fellow of the Photographers Society of America in 1954, and ran a photography studio in Halifax until his death from cerebral hemorrhage in 1956. MacAskill's wife, Elva (1891-1968) continued to run the studio until eight years after his death.

MacAskill's photographs are held in the collections of the National Gallery of Canada, the McCord Museum, and the Cape Breton University Art Gallery. The house in which he was born, now known as the MacAskill House, is recognized by Nova Scotia's Heritage Property Act and houses a museum dedicated to his work.
