= Schooner Lager =

Regional beer in the eastern Canadian provinces

Schooner Maritime Lager

Schooner is a regional lager style beer of the eastern Canadian provinces. It has an alcohol content of 5.0% ABV and is brewed at the Oland Brewery in Halifax, Nova Scotia. They are currently sold by Labatt Breweries of Canada.

== History ==
First brewed by sailing enthusiast and brewer Sidney Culverwell Oland in the 1950s, Schooner beer was named after the famous racing and fishing vessel the schooner Bluenose. A replica schooner, Bluenose II, was built by the Oland family in 1963. The Oland family (not to be confused with the Saint John, New Brunswick relatives who still own and operate Moosehead Brewery) used Bluenose II as both a private yacht and as a promotion for the beer brand. An illustration of the ship is found on the label as well as the cap. Sidney Oland donated the schooner to the Province of Nova Scotia in 1971. The Oland family sold their breweries to Labatt in 1971, and Schooner has since been produced under the InBev umbrella.

== Vintage marketing ==
Once a popular brand of beer in eastern Canada, Schooner had many memorable advertising campaigns that included such taglines as "The Schooner, the better", "I'd sooner have a Schooner", and "Quaff a Schooner Beer". Although the marketing campaigns have long since ceased, Schooner is still carried by liquor stores across the Maritime provinces.

== See also ==
- Oland Brewery
- Labatt Brewing Company
- Bluenose II
- Ken Westerfield – Labatt Schooner Frisbee Team (1987)
