= USS James E. Williams =

US Arleigh Burke-class destroyer

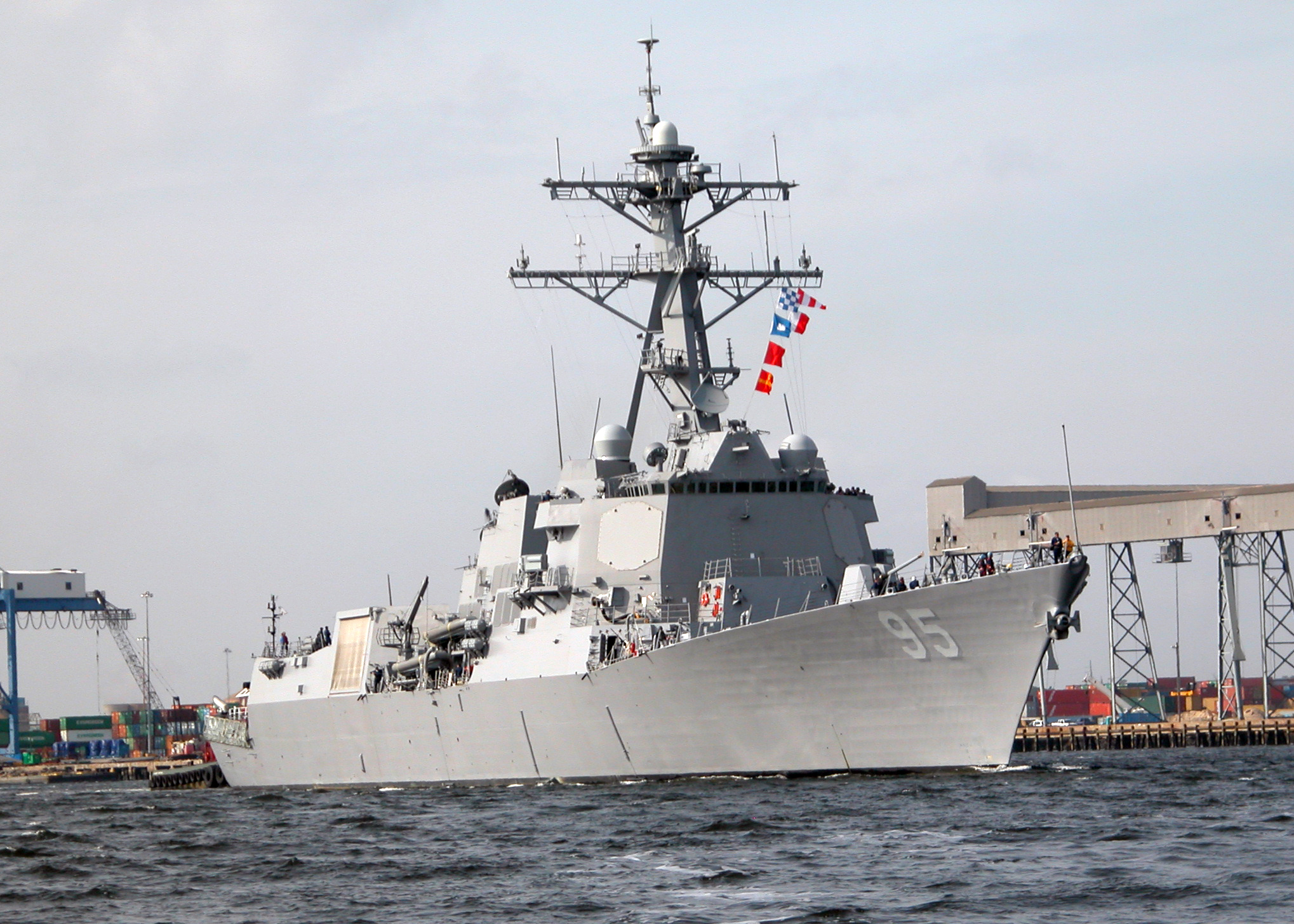
- USS James E. Williams on 7 December 2004

History

United States
- Name: James E. Williams
- Namesake: James E. Williams
- Ordered: 6 March 1998
- Builder: Ingalls Shipbuilding
- Laid down: 15 July 2002
- Launched: 25 June 2003
- Commissioned: 11 December 2004
- Home port: Norfolk
- Identification: MMSI number: 369962000; Callsign: NPBR; Hull number: DDG-95
- Motto: Lead from the Front
- Honours and awards: See Awards
- Status: in active service
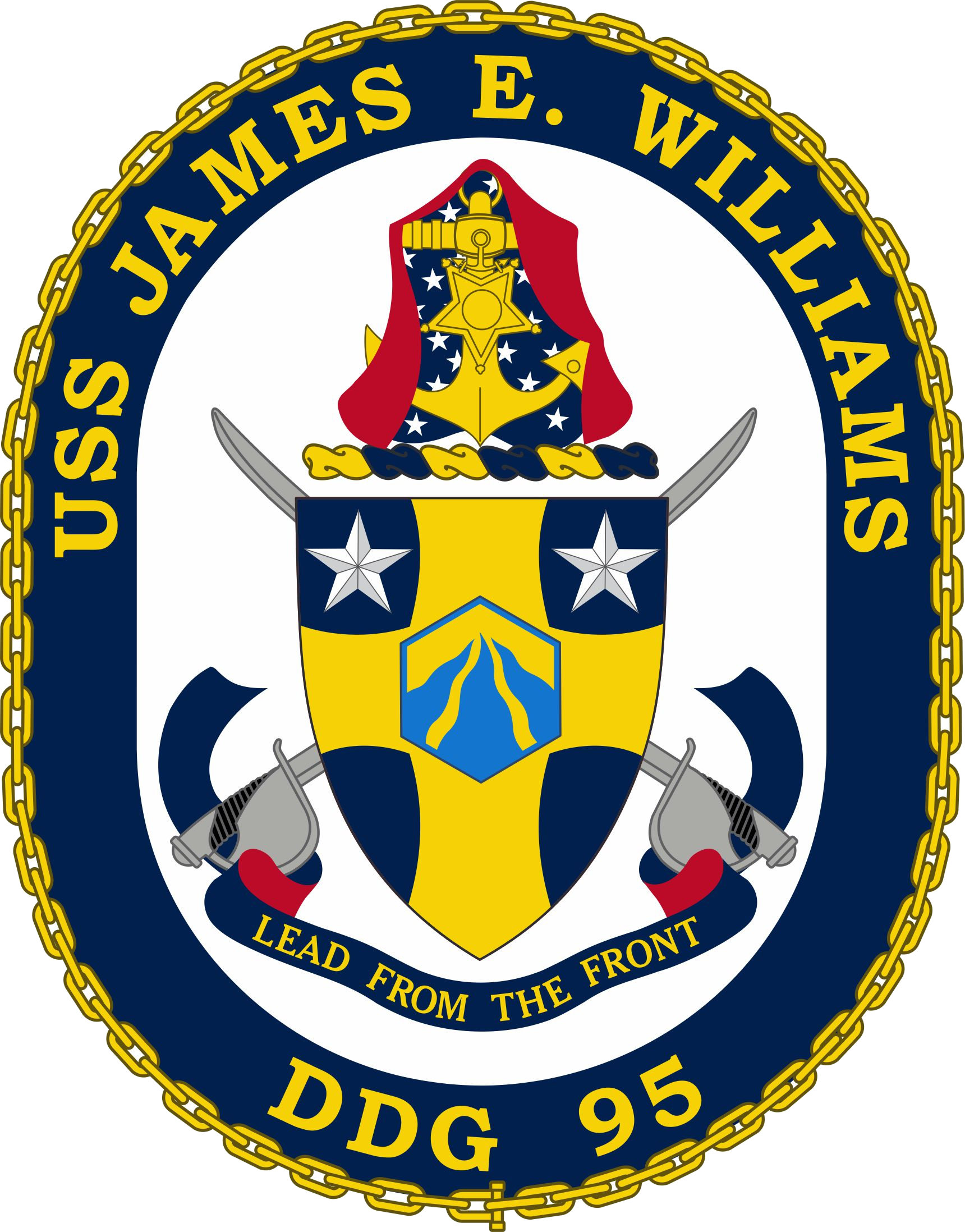
- Badge

General characteristics
- Class & type: Arleigh Burke-class destroyer
- Displacement: 9200 tons
- Length: 509 ft 6 in (155.30 m)
- Beam: 66 ft (20 m)
- Draft: 31 ft (9.4 m)
- Propulsion: 4 × General Electric LM2500-30 gas turbines, 2 shafts, 100,000 shp (75 MW)
- Speed: >30 kn (56 km/h; 35 mph)
- Range: 4,400 nmi (8,100 km; 5,100 mi) at 20 kn (37 km/h; 23 mph)
- Complement: 32 officers and 348 enlisted
- Armament: Guns: 1 × 5-inch (127 mm)/62 Mk 45 Mod 4 (lightweight gun); 1 × 20 mm (0.8 in) Phalanx CIWS; 2 × 25 mm (0.98 in) Mk 38 machine gun system; 4 × 0.50 in (12.7 mm) caliber guns; Missiles: 1 × 32-cell, 1 × 64-cell (96 total cells) Mk 41 vertical launching system (VLS): RIM-66M surface-to-air missile; RIM-156 surface-to-air missile; RIM-174A Standard ERAM; RIM-161 anti-ballistic missile; RIM-162 ESSM (quad-packed); BGM-109 Tomahawk cruise missile; RUM-139 vertical launch ASROC; Torpedoes: 2 × Mark 32 triple torpedo tubes: Mark 46 lightweight torpedo; Mark 50 lightweight torpedo; Mark 54 lightweight torpedo
- Aircraft carried: 2 × MH-60R Seahawk helicopters

USS James E. Williams (DDG-95) is an Arleigh Burke-class (Flight IIA) Aegis guided missile destroyer in the United States Navy. The ship was named for Boatswain's Mate First Class James Elliott Williams (1930–1999), a River Patrol Boat commander and Medal of Honor recipient from the Vietnam War who is considered to be the most decorated enlisted man in Navy history. As of April 2023 the ship is part of Destroyer Squadron 26 based out of Naval Station Norfolk.

== Construction ==
James E. Williams had her keel laid down on 15 July 2002 by the Northrop Grumman Ship Systems at Ingalls Shipbuilding in Pascagoula, Mississippi. She was launched on 25 June 2003, sponsored by Elaine Weaver Williams, Chief Petty Officer Williams's widow. On 11 December 2004, James E. Williams was commissioned in Charleston, South Carolina.

== Service history ==
On 2 May 2006, James E. Williams deployed on her maiden deployment as part of the Global War on Terrorism Surface Strike Group (GWOT SSG) 06–2. James E. Williams joined with the amphibious transport dock Trenton and guided-missile cruiser Hue City as part of a surge deployment. On 17 October 2006, James E. Williams completed her first deployment conducting anti-piracy operations off the coast of Somalia as part of the maritime security operations.

James E. Williams deployed again on 9 July 2007 as a part of the Enterprise Carrier Strike Group. The strike group consisted of the aircraft carrier Enterprise, the destroyers Forrest Sherman, Arleigh Burke and Stout; the guided-missile cruiser Gettysburg; and the fast-attack submarine Philadelphia, along with the fast combat support ship USNS Supply. On the morning of 30 October 2007, Combined Maritime Forces Headquarters, in Bahrain, received a call from the International Maritime Bureau, located in Kuala Lumpur, Malaysia, providing the status of the North Korean cargo vessel Dai Hong Dan, which had been taken over 29 October by Somali pirates. The ship was approximately 60 nautical miles (110 km) northeast of Mogadishu, Somalia. At that time, James E. Williams was about 50 nautical miles (93 km) from the vessel and sent a helicopter to investigate the situation. The destroyer arrived in the vicinity of the Korean ship midday local time and contacted the pirates via bridge-to-bridge radio, ordering them to give up their weapons. At that point, the Korean crew had confronted the Somali pirates, regained control of the ship and began communicating with James E. Williams, requesting medical assistance. The crew said the pirates had been in control of the bridge, but the crew had retained control of the steering and engineering spaces. The crew of James E. Williams provided care and assistance for approximately 12 hours to crew members and Somali pirates aboard Dai Hong Dan. Five pirates were captured and two were killed. The pirates remained aboard Dai Hong Dan.

In November 2007, James E. Williams aided the crew of the Taiwanese ship, M/V Ching Fong Hwa 168, which had also been hijacked by Somali pirates. After the pirates returned to shore, the destroyer escorted the Taiwanese ship out of Somali waters and provided needed supplies and medical assistance. On 19 December 2007, she returned from her second deployment to the Fifth Fleet AOR in support of Operations Iraqi and Enduring Freedom.

On 20 April 2009, James E. Williams left on her third deployment in three years, deploying to the sixth and fifth Fleet areas of operations from Naval Station Norfolk as the lead element of the Bataan Amphibious Ready Group. James E. Williams conducted maritime security operations in the Mediterranean Sea and Persian Gulf regions, including working with other nations' maritime forces. She returned to her homeport at Naval Station Norfolk on 19 October 2009.

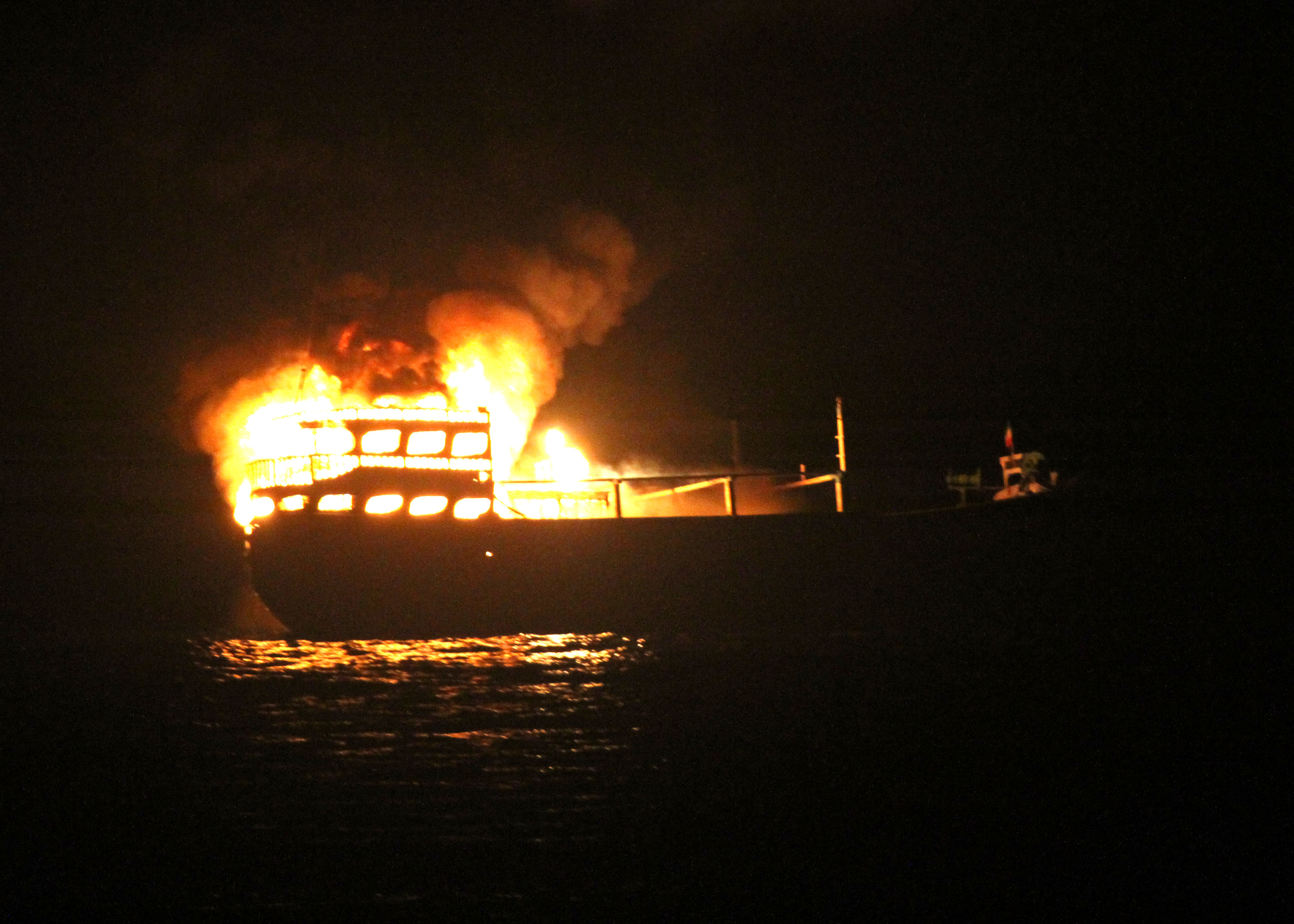
Dhow on fire in the Gulf of Oman on 8 August 2012.

On the evening of 8 August 2012, James E. Williams rescued ten mariners from a burning Iranian-flagged dhow (pictured) while operating in the Gulf of Oman. Of the ten mariners, eight were identified as Iranians and two were Pakistanis. The rescued mariners received medical treatment and transport to the carrier Enterprise before being repatriated back to Iran on 10 August. James E. Williams reentered the Mediterranean Sea on 25 August.

=== Controversies ===
- In December 2009, about six weeks after the ship returned to Norfolk from a six-month deployment to the Mediterranean and Arabian seas, nine crewmembers were given non-judicial punishments for fraternization. Five of the nine were male chief petty officers while the other four were female junior enlisted sailors. Furthermore, one other crew member faced criminal charges for sexual assault. The chiefs involved were being processed for separation from the Navy. In addition, the ship's skipper, a commander, and the top enlisted sailor, a command master chief, were relieved of their positions and reassigned to shore-based administrative duties. Neither were implicated in the fraternization cases or alleged sexual assault but were removed due to a loss of confidence in their leadership. The ship's executive officer (XO), also a commander, was reassigned as the XO on the destroyer Bainbridge. He was not implicated in any of the allegations.
- In September 2014, it was announced the ship's commanding officer and command master chief were replaced pending an investigation into the command climate. At the time, James E. Williams was about midway through an eight-month deployment. At that time, a captain from the staff of Destroyer Squadron 2, assumed command of the ship.

=== Ports visited ===
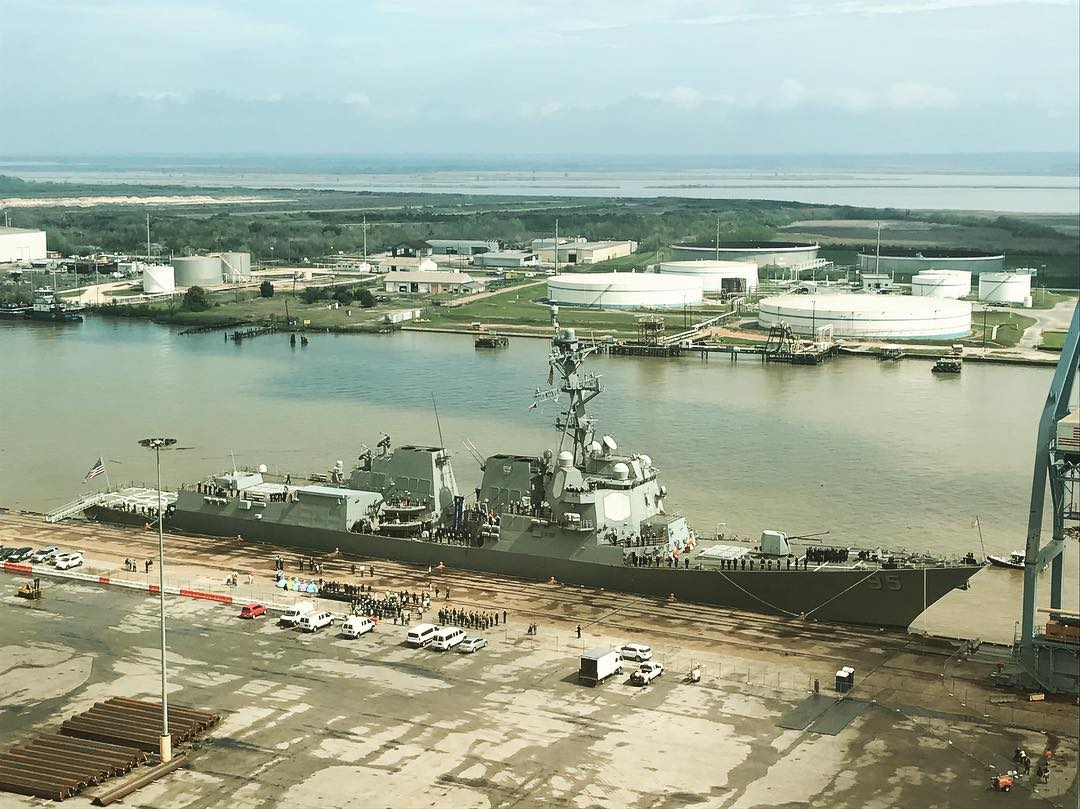
James E. Williams docked in the Port of Mobile in Alabama

During the 2014-2015 deployment, James E. Williams made port calls to Rota, Spain; Djibouti City, Djibouti; Victoria, Seychelles; and Port Louis, Mauritius.

On 3 August 2017, the destroyer visited Trondheim Seilforening in Trondheim, Norway.

On 29 November 2017 she visited the Port of Odesa in Ukraine.

During the 2017 Deployment, the ship visited Rotterdam, Netherlands; Kiel, Germany (as a part of Kiel Week); Reykjavík, Iceland; Rota, Spain; Trondheim, Norway; Bergen, Norway; Riga, Latvia; Lisbon, Portugal; Souda Bay, Greece; Manama, Bahrain; Jeddah, Saudi Arabia; and Odesa, Ukraine prior to returning home to Norfolk, VA on 23 December 2017. The ship's crew also earned their Blue Nose for crossing into the Arctic Circle.

On 15 February 2021, James E. Williams and Colombian Navy frigate ARC Antioquia (FM-53) conducted a passing exercise in the Caribbean Sea.

== Awards ==
- Navy Unit Commendation - (Jul-Dec 2007, Jan-Aug 2020)
- Navy Meritorious Unit Commendation - (Jan 2011-Nov 2012)
- Navy E Ribbon - (2011)
