= Alexander Keith's Brewery =

Anheuser-Busch InBev subsidiary brewing beer in Nova Scotia, Canada

Coordinates: 44.6446°N 63.5702°W

Alexander Keith's
- Industry: brewing industry
- Founded: 1820
- Headquarters: 1496 Lower Water Street, Halifax, Nova Scotia, Canada
- Owner: AB InBev
- Website: www.keiths.ca

Alexander Keith's is a brewery in Halifax, Nova Scotia, Canada. It is owned by Anheuser-Busch InBev.

The brewery was founded in 1820 by Alexander Keith who had immigrated from Scotland three years previously. In 1928, the business was sold to Oland Brewery, which was in turn sold to the Labatt Brewing Company. Following a number of mergers and acquisitions, Labatt's is now part of Anheuser-Busch InBev.

Since 1928, parent companies kept the brand alive, and by the 1990s Alexander Keith's India Pale Ale (IPA) was the most popular beer in Nova Scotia. A number of other styles is also marketed. Although Alexander Keith products were originally produced in the Halifax brewery only for sale in the Maritimes, they are now produced at Anheuser-Busch InBev plants across Canada and America.

Archived recipes for beer made by the Alexander Keith's Brewery in the early 1900s show high levels of hopping, with large all-malt mash ingredients and no use of corn, typical for beers of that time. In contrast, the modern beer marketed as Alexander Keith's IPA is only 5% alcohol by volume and lightly hopped, which does not meet the accepted criteria for an India pale ale. At the 2016 Canadian Brewing Awards, Alexander Keith's IPA won third place, not in the IPA category, but in the "North American Style Blonde or Golden Ale" category.

== Gallery ==
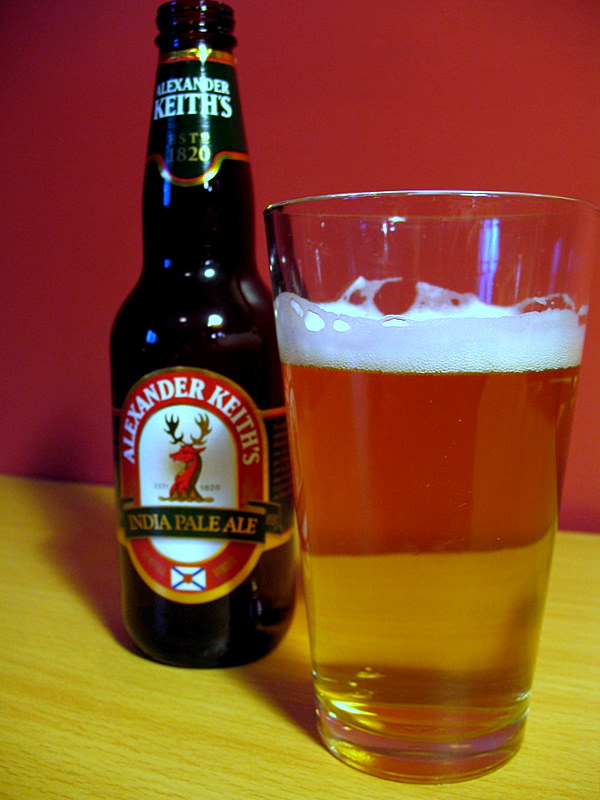
Alexander Keith's India Pale Ale

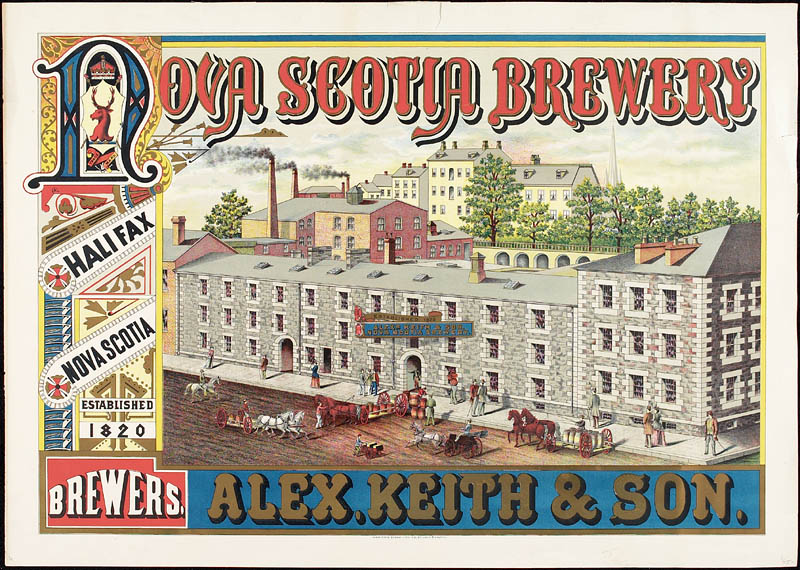
Alexander Keith Brewery, Halifax, Nova Scotia, c. 1865–1870.

== See also ==
- List of breweries in Canada
