= Bluenose (postage stamp) =

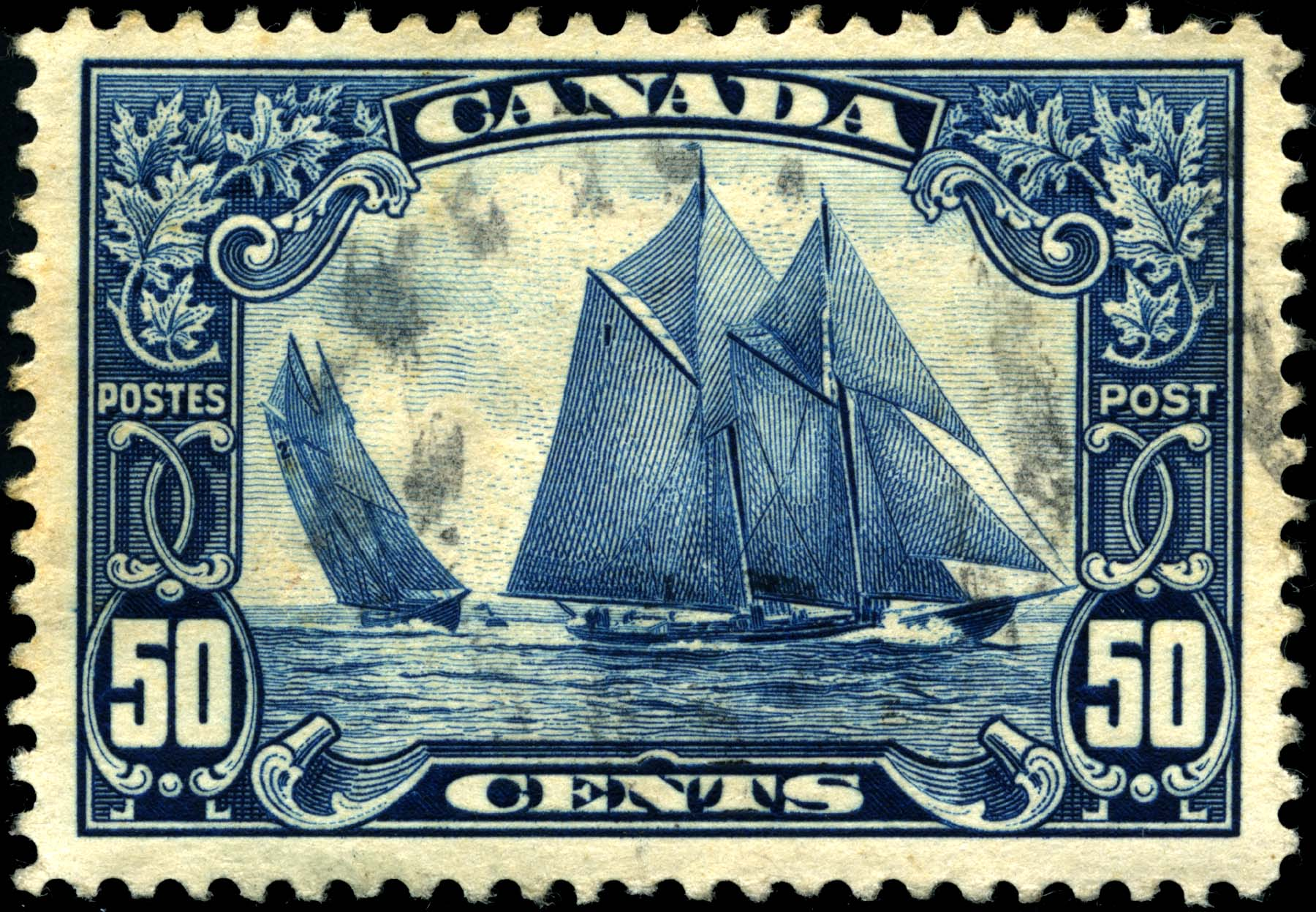
- Country of production: Canada
- Date of production: 8 January 1929
- Depicts: Bluenose
- Nature of rarity: Classic stamp
- No. in existence: Unknown; 1,044,900 printed
- Face value: CAN$ 50-cent

The Bluenose is the nickname for a 50-cent definitive postage stamp issued by the Canadian Post Office on 8 January 1929 as part of the King George V "Scroll Issue". Scott number is 158 with a perforation of 12. The stamp depicts the fishing schooner Bluenose and the design, by the Canadian Bank Note Company, Ottawa, is a montage of two different images of the vessel, racing off Halifax Harbour. The stamp is considered a classic even though it was issued after 1900. It has been called "Canada's Finest Stamp" and is a favorite among collectors.

Three printing plates were made; plate 1 (of 200 impressions) was never used because of defects found, but plates 2 and 3 (of 100 impressions) were used to print 1,044,900 copies of the stamp. The photographs for the engraved stamp were taken by W.R. MacAskill in 1922 and the vignette was engraved by the American Bank Note Company, New York City.

In 2001 a Bluenose first day cover sold for CAN $3,650. One of two known imperforate sheets of 100 stamps, previously sold in 1970, was auctioned in 2017 for US $52,580 (US$45,500 before buyer's premium).

Stamps issued in 1982 and 1999 show all, or part, of the original Bluenose stamp in their designs. The 1982 stamp is a stamp-on-stamp design while the 1998 issue was in commemoration of the naval designer William James Roué of the original schooner.

== See also ==
- Classic stamp
- List of notable postage stamps
