= Oland Brewery =

Brewery in Nova Scotia, Canada

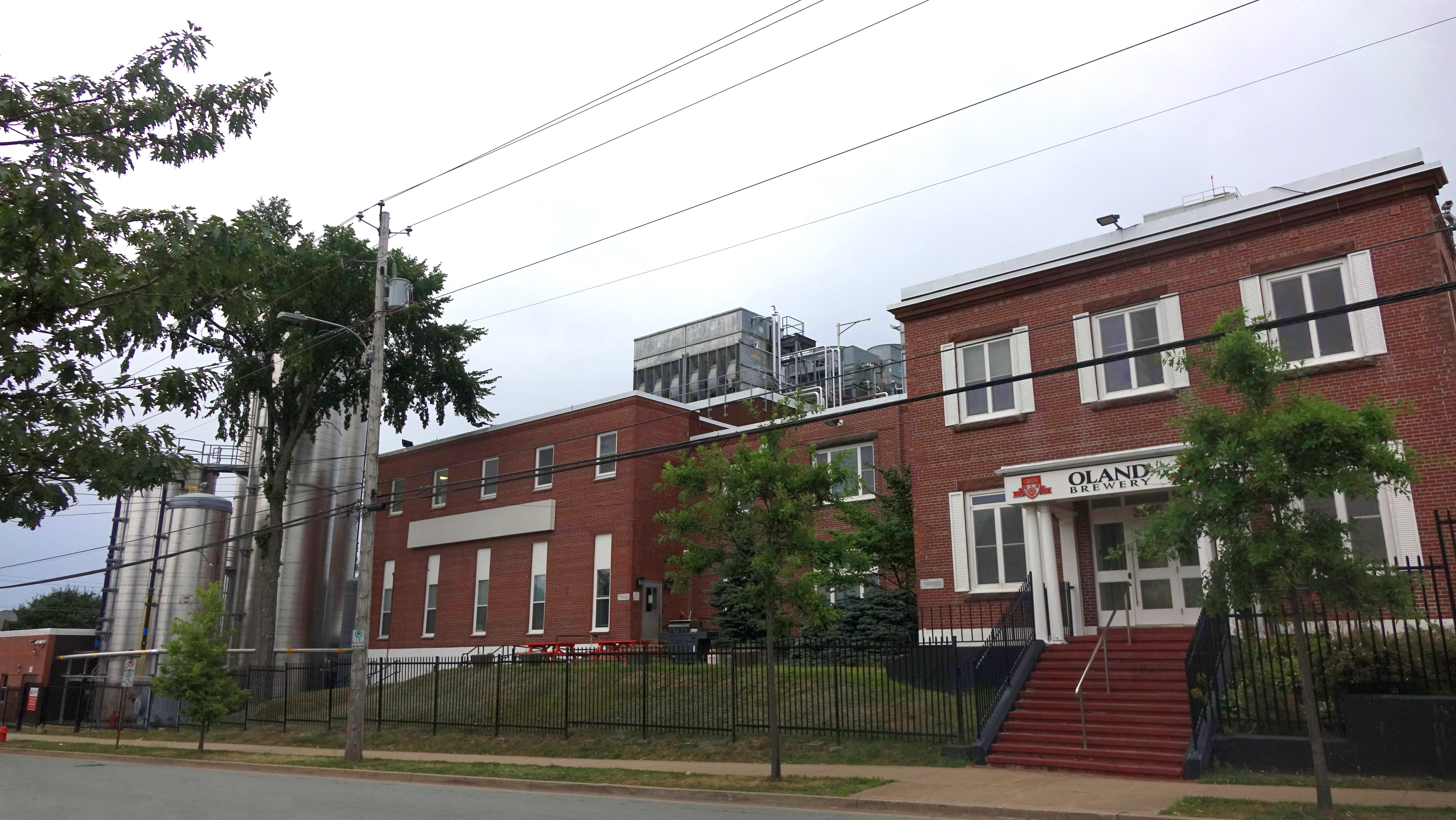
- Oland brewery in Halifax, Nova Scotia in 2019
- Industry: Brewing
- Predecessor: S. Oland & Sons
- Founded: 1907; 119 years ago
- Headquarters: Halifax, Nova Scotia, Canada
- Owner: AB InBev

Oland Brewery, formerly S. Oland & Sons, is a brewing company in Halifax, Nova Scotia, Canada (established 1907), which also acquired Alexander Keith's Brewery (1928), and is now owned by Labatt Brewing Company (1971), itself a unit of InBev. Sidney Oland (gt. grandson of Sidney C. Oland) served as a senior executive of Labatt Brewing Company.

The Oland family has been active in public life in Nova Scotia. The long-term CEO of the company Sidney Culverwell Oland made significant contributions to the military, the arts and the cultural life of Nova Scotia. Sidney commissioned the building of Bluenose II. Victor de Bedia Oland was lieutenant-governor of Nova Scotia from 1968 to 1973. (The Oland family also founded Moosehead beer in 1867, which remains independent.)

Brands brewed at Oland's Halifax brewery include:

- Oland Export Ale
- Schooner Lager
- Alexander Keith's India Pale Ale
- Alexander Keith's Red Amber Ale
- Alexander Keith's Traditional Lager
- Budweiser
- Bud Light
- Michelob Ultra
- Labatt Blue
- Busch
- Busch Ice
- Rolling Rock

== See also ==
- List of breweries in Canada
