= Delawana (schooner) =

Fishing schooner from Nova Scotia

The Delawana was a fishing schooner based in Riverport, Nova Scotia.

== International Fishing Vessel Championship, 1920 ==
Delawana was the first schooner to represent Canada at the first International Fishing Vessel Championship races in 1920 under command of Capt. Thomas Himmelman from Riverport, Nova Scotia. On 11 October 1920, Delawana defeated the Canadian schooner Gilbert B. Walters, sailed by Capt. Angus Walters, when the topmast of the Gilbert B. Walters broke during one of the races.

Much to the dismay of the crew, the Delawana then lost in two straight races to the American Gloucester fishing schooner Esperanto under Capt. Marty Welch. Despite the loss, the crew from Riverport did represent Canada at the first International Fishing Vessel Championship and built a pride in labour that would sustain the community and much of Lunenburg County for over a century.
