= Oland Export Ale =

Oland Export Ale is a regional beer of the Canadian Maritime provinces. Brewed at the Oland Brewery in Halifax, Nova Scotia, it has an alcohol content of 5.0% ABV.

== History ==
A longtime Maritime favourite, Oland Export was first introduced in the early 1920s, and is cold-aged. It was originally produced by the Oland family, from whom the ale is named. The family sold their breweries to Labatt in 1971, and Oland Export is currently produced under the InBev umbrella. It was previously brewed by Halifax's Oland & Son Ltd.

== Marketing ==
A popular brand of beer in eastern Canada, Oland Export Ale is best known for its longtime advertising slogan "Good times, great friends, and Oland Export Ale".

== See also ==
- Oland Brewery
- Labatt Brewing Company
- Anheuser-Busch InBev
