= Victoria Park, Halifax, Nova Scotia =

Public park in Nova Scotia, Canada

Coordinates: 44.6410°N 63.5797°W

Victoria Park
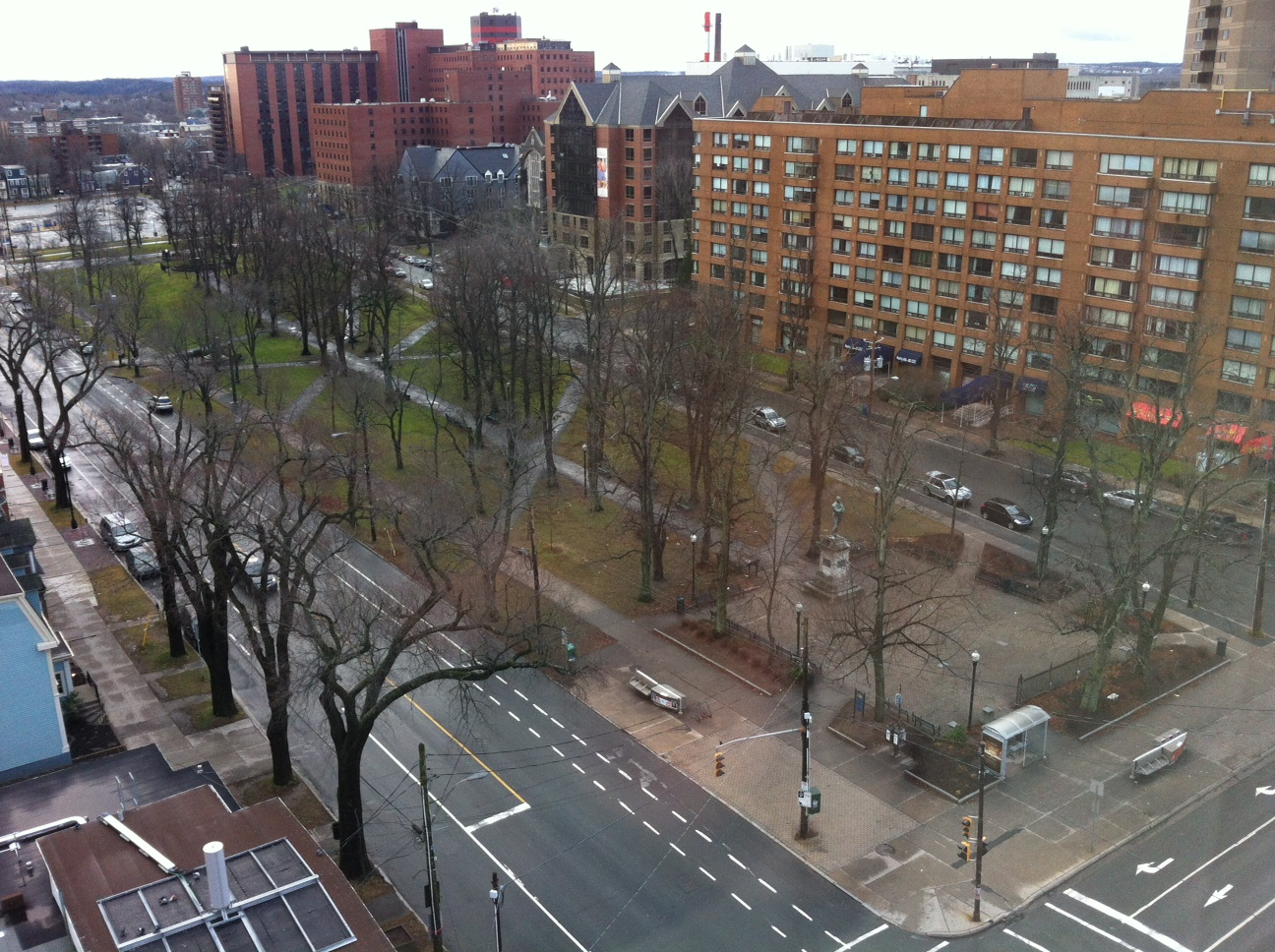
- Victoria Park
- Interactive map of Victoria Park
- Type: Public park
- Location: Halifax, Nova Scotia
- Operator: Halifax Regional Municipality

Victoria Park is an urban park on Spring Garden Road in Halifax, Nova Scotia, Canada, across from the Halifax Public Gardens.

The North British Society erected various monuments and statues: Robert Burns, Sir Walter Scott and William Alexander, 1st Earl of Stirling.

At the south end of the park Sidney Culverwell Oland created a fountain in memory of his wife Linda Oland (1966).

== Robert Burns statue ==
George A. Lawson created the memorial to Robert Burns in Ayr, inaugurated in 1892. Other versions were circulated to Dublin, Melbourne, Montreal, Winnipeg, Halifax and elsewhere. The statue was cast in Halifax in 1919. On the base of the Robbie Burns statue are commemorations of the following poems:

- Front: The Cotter's Saturday Night – “From scenes like these old Scotia’s grandeur springs.” (1786). A "Cotter" (a peasant given a Cottage in exchange for labour) and his family relax on Saturday evening, after a week of work, knowing Sunday is a day of rest.
- Right: Tam O’Shanter’s Ride – “Ae spring brought off her master hale but left behind her ain grey tail.” (1791) One of Burns most famous poems. A sculpture of the final scene when Tam O'Shanter safely reaches Brig o' Doon after almost being captured by witches.
- Left: The Jolly Beggars : Love and Liberty - A Cantata (1785) Scene of a group of Ayrshire vagrants drinking one night in Poosie Nansie’s tavern in Mauchline. A maimed homeless veteran sings a song of his long service, fighting first in the Battle of the Plains of Abraham ("the heights of Abram")
- Back: To a Mountain Daisy, On Turning one Down, With The Plough, in April 1786 – “Wee, modest, crimson-tipped flow’r; Thou’s met me in a evil hour.” (1786) Scene of a farmer using the fate of a ploughed under flower (Bellis perennis) as a metaphor for life.
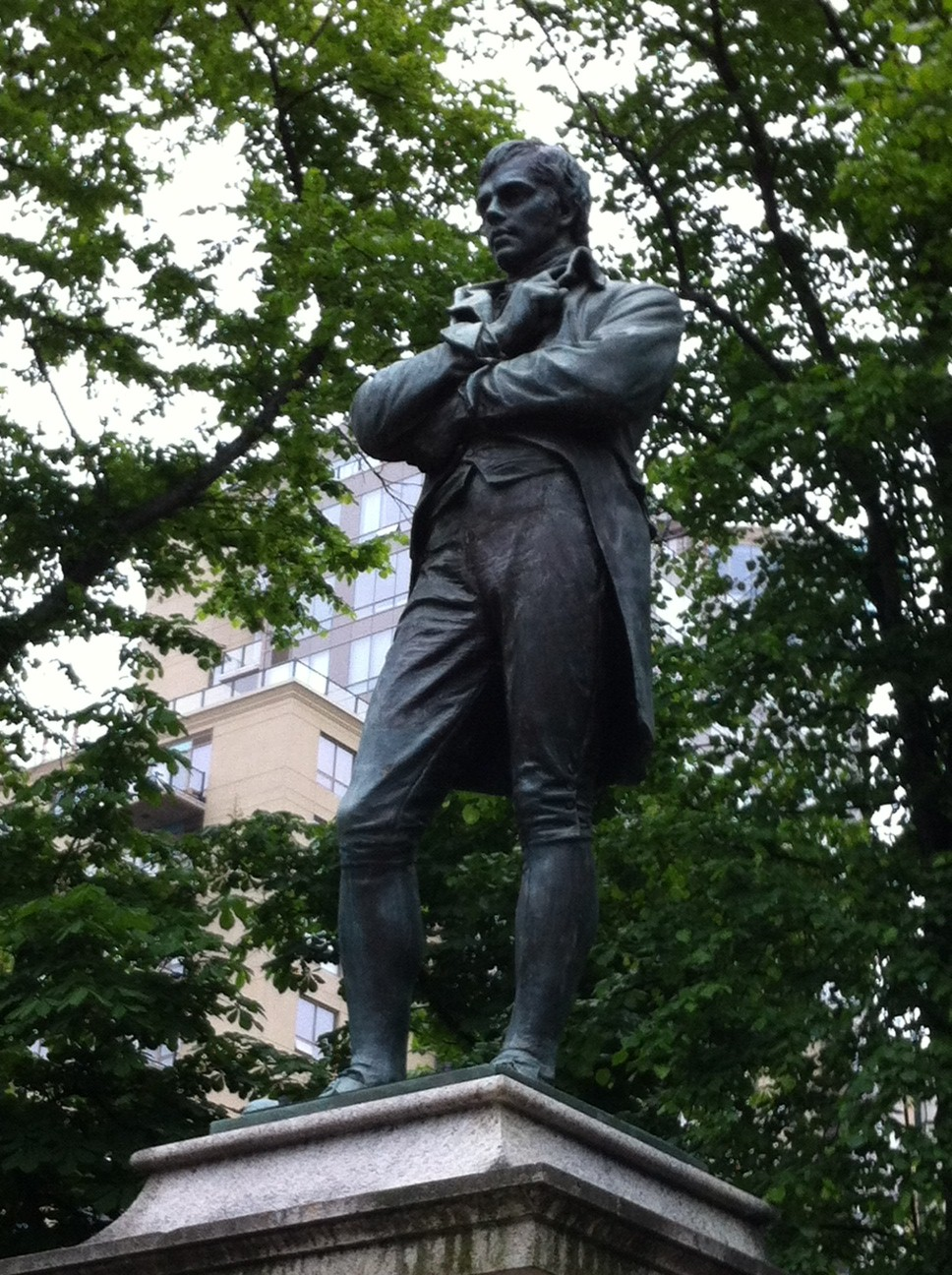
Rabbie Burns by George A. Lawson (1919)

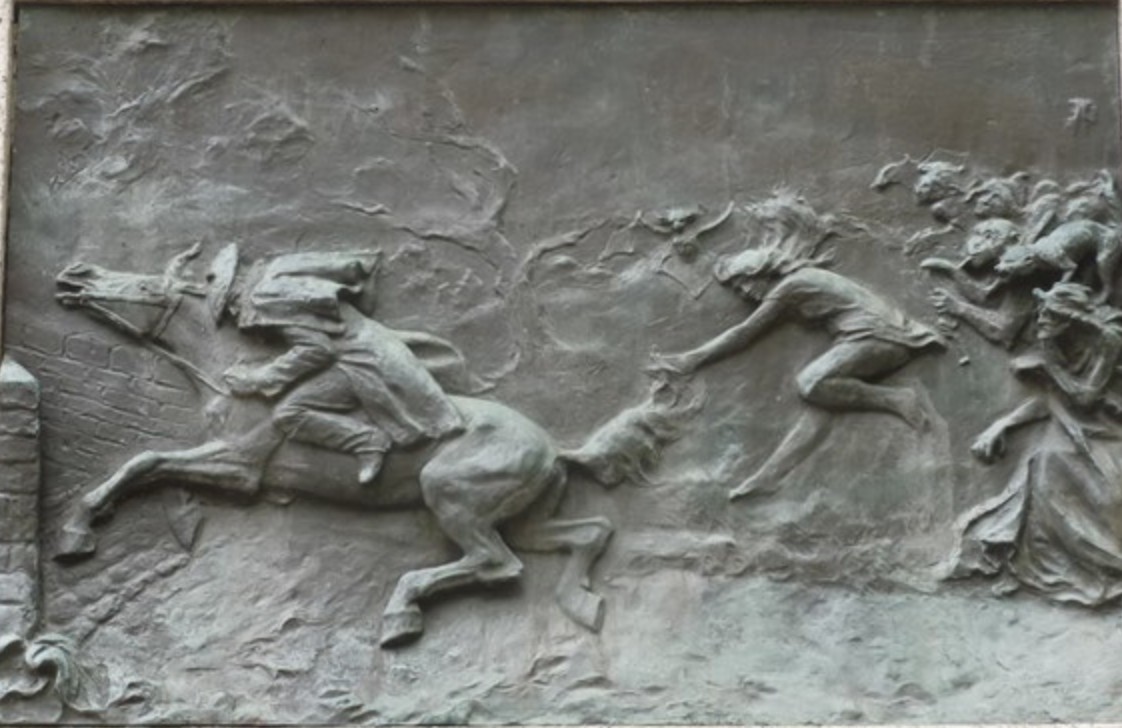
Tam O’Shanter’s Ride, Robbie Burns Statue

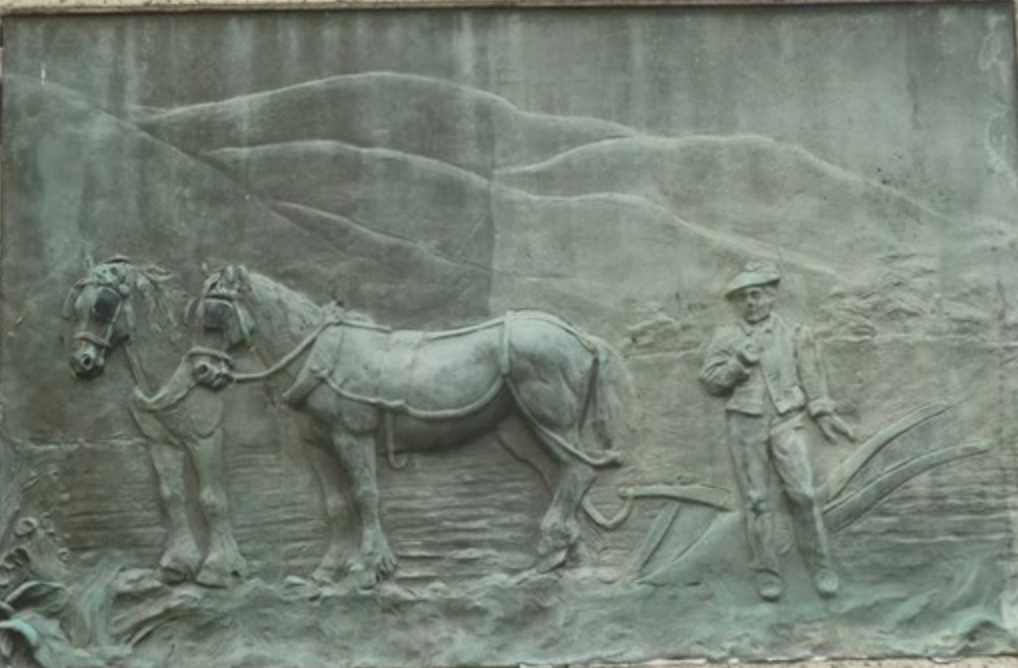
To a Mountain Daisy, Robbie Burns Statue

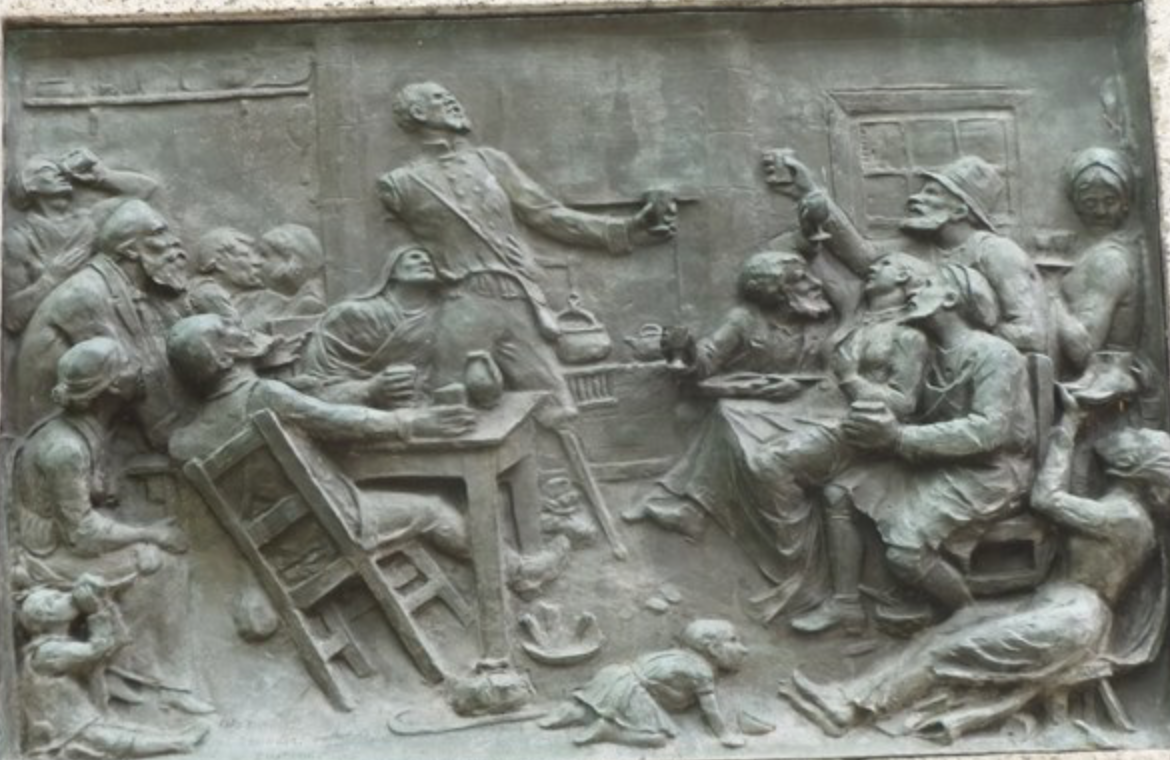
The Jolly Baggers, Robbie Burns Statue

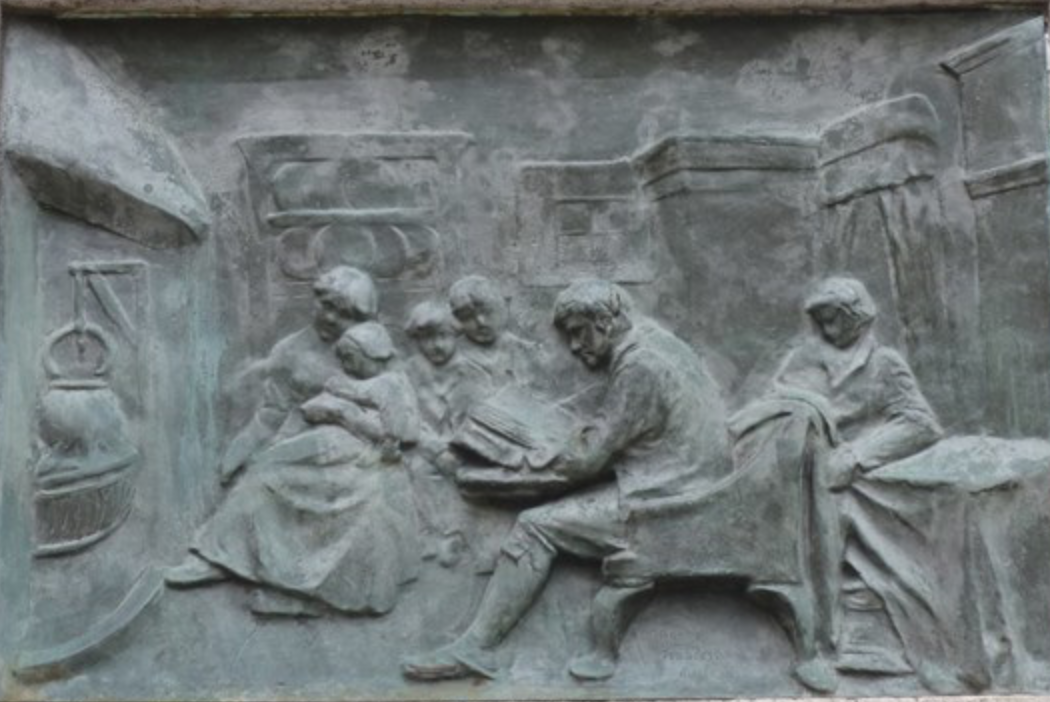
The Cotter's Saturday Night, Robbie Burns Statue

== Gallery ==
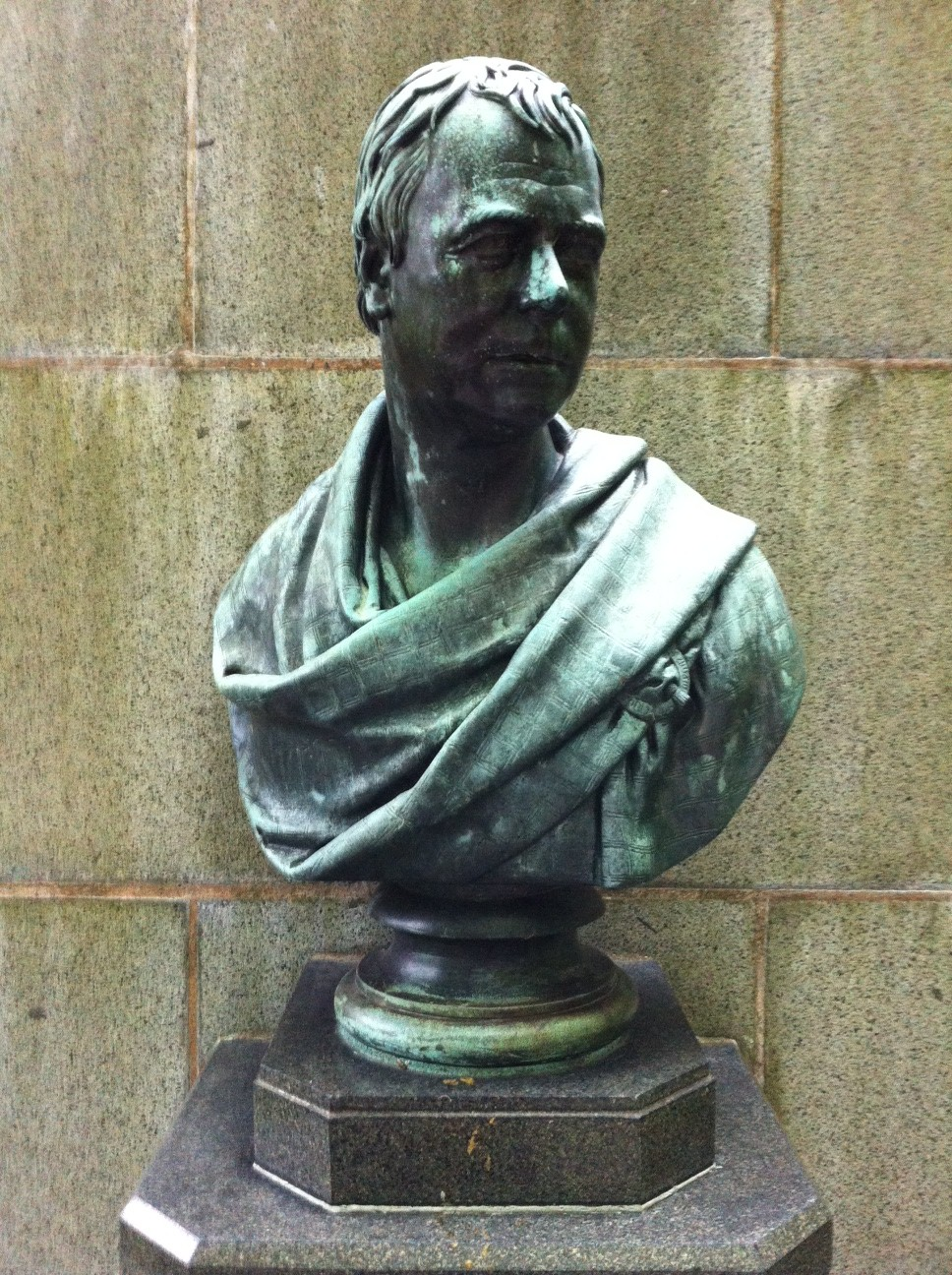
Sir Walter Scott by Sir Francis Chantrey (1932)

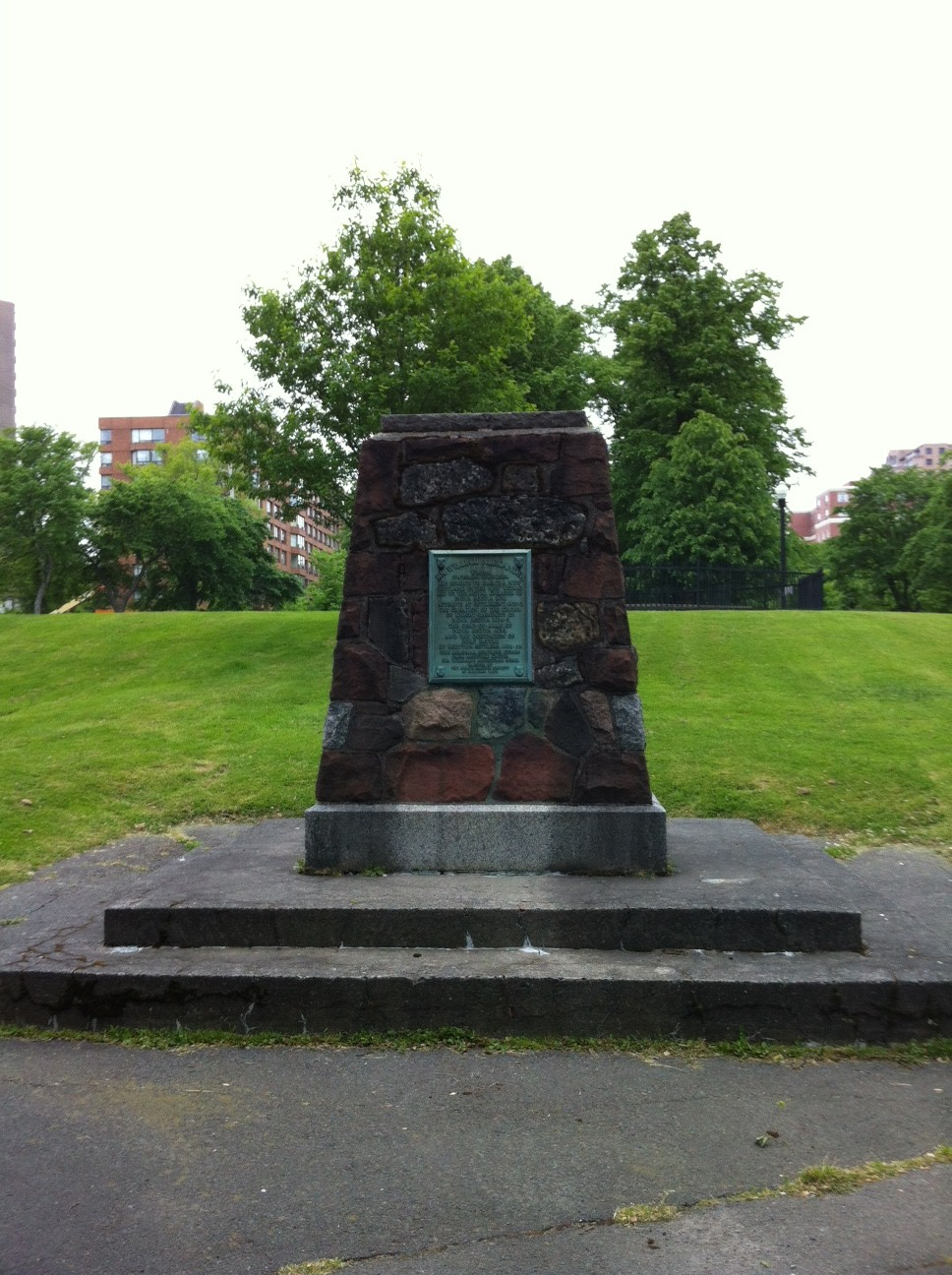
William Alexander Monument, built of stones from his Menstrie Castle (1957) (also see Edinburgh Castle)

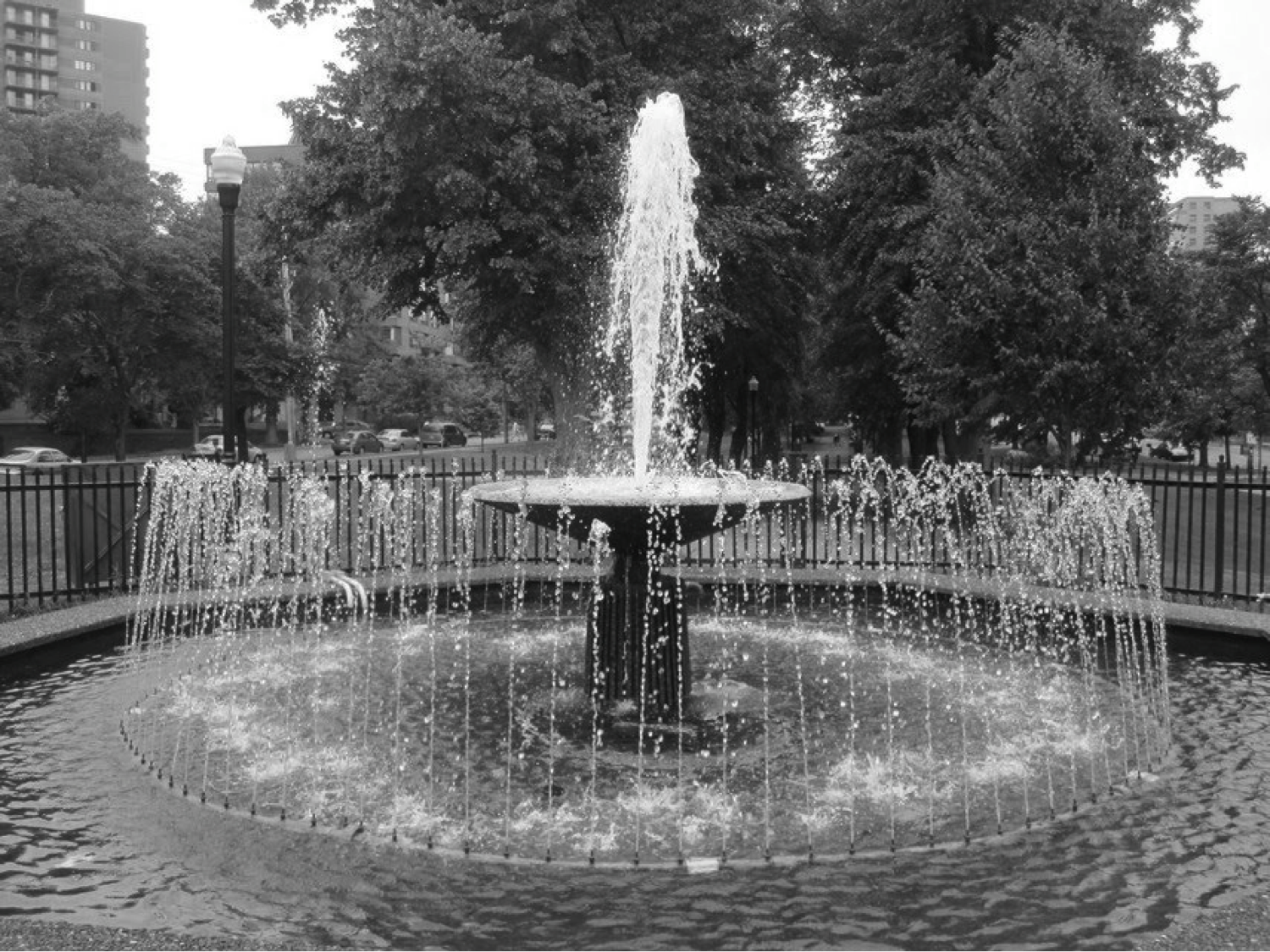
Sidney Culverwell Oland's Memorial Fountain to his wife (1966)

== See also ==
- Royal eponyms in Canada
- List of Robert Burns memorials
