= Bluenose II =

Canadian racing schooner

- Bluenose II off Blue Rocks, Nova Scotia, Canada

History

Canada
- Name: Bluenose II
- Builder: Smith and Rhuland
- Launched: 24 July 1963
- Identification: IMO number: 5419086; MMSI number: 316245000; Callsign: CYJZ
- Status: in active service

General characteristics
- Tonnage: 191 gross, 96 net
- Length: 46 m (150 ft 11 in) o/a; 34 m (111 ft 7 in) lwl
- Beam: 8 m (26 ft 3 in)
- Draft: 5 m (16 ft 5 in)
- Propulsion: Sails; 2 auxiliary 250 hp CAT diesel engines
- Mainmast, height from deck: 38 m (124 ft 8 in)
- Foremast, height from deck: 36 m (118 ft 1 in)
- Sail area: 1,036 m^{2} (11,150 sq ft)
- Mainsail area: 386 m^{2} (4,150 sq ft)
- Speed: 8 knots (15 km/h) (engine); 16 knots (30 km/h) (under sail)
- Crew: 5 Officers, Chief Cook, 12 Deckhands

Bluenose II is a replica of the fishing and racing schooner Bluenose, commissioned by Sidney Culverwell Oland and built in 1963 as a promotional yacht for Oland Brewery. Sidney Oland donated the schooner to Nova Scotia in 1971 and it has since operated as a sailing ambassador and promotional device for Nova Scotia tourism. In honour of her predecessor's record, Bluenose II does not officially race.

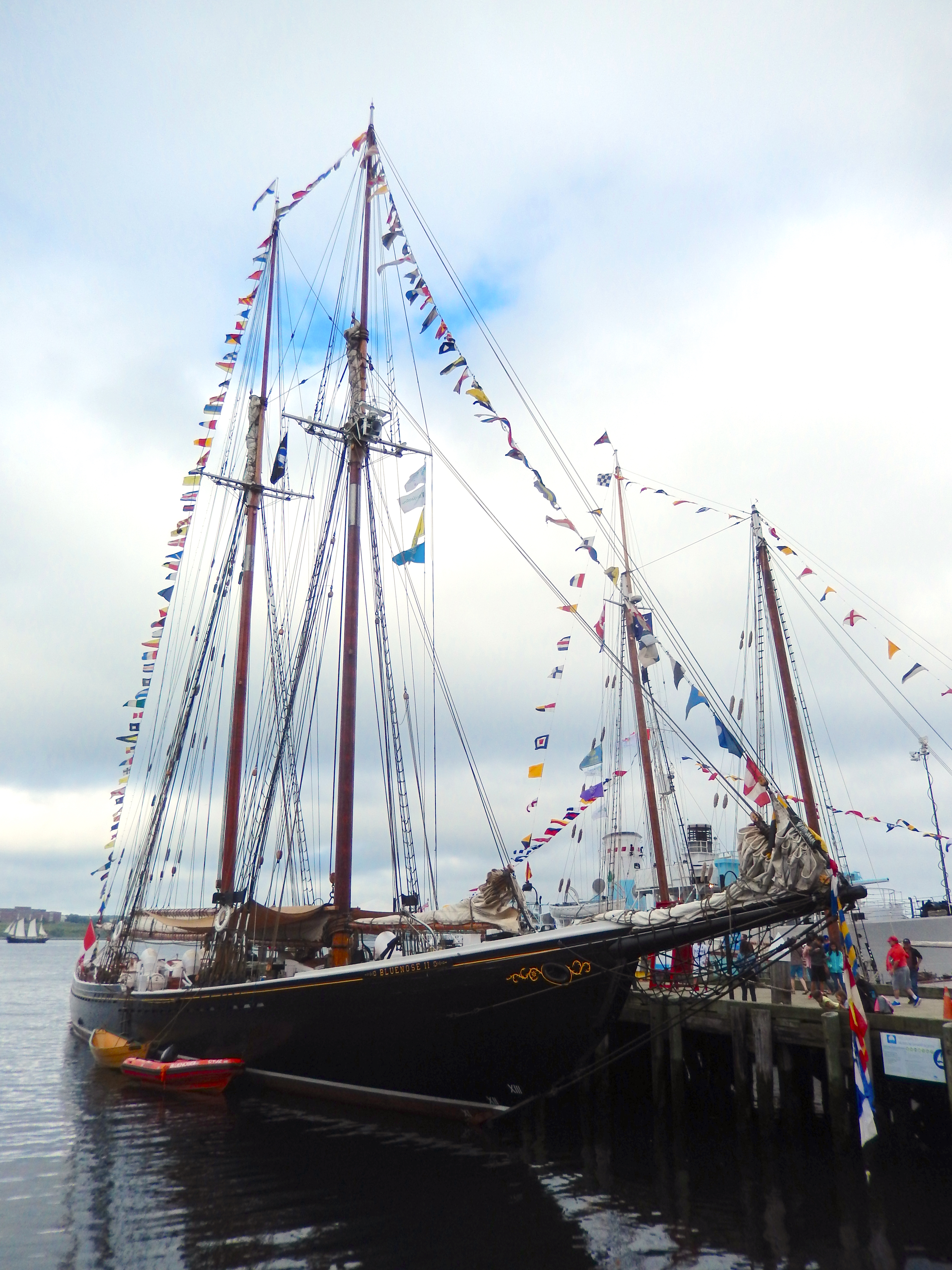
Bluenose II docked in Halifax Harbour, July 2017.

== Construction ==
Bluenose II was launched at Lunenburg on 24 July 1963, built to original plans and by some of the same workers at Smith and Rhuland. The original captain of Bluenose, Angus J. Walters, was consulted on the replica's design. The replica was commissioned by Sidney Culverwell Oland for roughly $300,000 (2.5 million in 2020 Canadian dollars) as a marketing tool for their Schooner Lager beer brand.

The ship has one of the largest mainsails in the world, measuring 386 square metres (4,150 ft^{2}). She has a total sail area of 1,036 square metres (11,150 ft^{2}).

In 2004, the Bluenose Preservation Trust, with Lex McKay and Senator Wilfred Moore, donated a piece of wood from the deck of the ship to the Six String Nation project. Parts of that material now serve multiple functions in Voyageur, the guitar at the heart of the project, including two elements of the neck laminate, the top and end blocks on the guitar's interior and decorative elements on the rosette surrounding the sound hole of the instrument.

== Provincial ownership ==
Sidney Culverwell Oland sold Bluenose II to the government of Nova Scotia in 1971 for the sum of $1. After a number of years of managing the schooner directly, the province gave possession of the ship to the "Bluenose II Preservation Trust". The trust's mandate was to restore the aging schooner to full operational status and continue to operate her for the people of Nova Scotia. Over the winter of 1994–95 the ship's hull was restored and she was recommissioned in May 1995.

During this time Bluenose II was involved in the Sponsorship scandal when the federal government allocated $2.3 million for the schooner through a consulting firm but only a small amount of the money reached the vessel. The trust maintained and operated Bluenose II until 31 March 2005, when the government of Nova Scotia placed the vessel under the management of the Lunenburg Marine Museum Society at the Fisheries Museum of the Atlantic. In a controversial move, the head of the trust, Senator Wilfred Moore, refused to release over $600,000 raised by the trust in the schooner's name to the current operators of Bluenose II. Moore agreed to turn the trust's assets over to the province in July 2012, but did not release the financial records from the trust.

== 2009 rebuild ==
In May 2009, the provincial and federal governments announced support for a major restoration of the Bluenose II to be led by the province's Tourism, Culture and Heritage Department. The project was projected to cost $14.4 million. In July 2010, the Nova Scotia government awarded a $12.5 million contract for the restoration of Bluenose II to a consortium of three Nova Scotia shipyards. When the ship was finally relaunched in 2012, after major delays, the final cost had risen closer to 16 million dollars, just from the Nova Scotian government.

This restoration was not without controversy. Tourism, Culture and Heritage Department sources stated that the restoration was "not intended to create an authentic replica of the original Bluenose" and that the builders would not be using the plans. Large portions of the hull were chipped while other small pieces were given away at the rebuilding site in Lunenburg NS. The masts, sails, booms, gaffs, deck boxes, rigging, and some ironwork will go back onto the vessel upon completion. This has led Joan Roue, a descendant of the first Bluenose's designer William Roue and current rights-holder of the design, to question whether this should even be considered the same ship.

As has almost all of the rest of the ship, even the keel has been remade. The rebuild aimed to have the schooner look more like the original Bluenose with smaller deckhouses and more deck space, as Bluenose II was built with yacht accommodation as opposed to the layout of a fishing schooner. Various subcomponents for this Bluenose II project were supplied from notable firms including the ships keel at Snyder's Shipyard in Dayspring, the ship's backbone of laminated ribs at Covey Island Boatworks in Riverport and assembly of the vessel in Lunenburg.

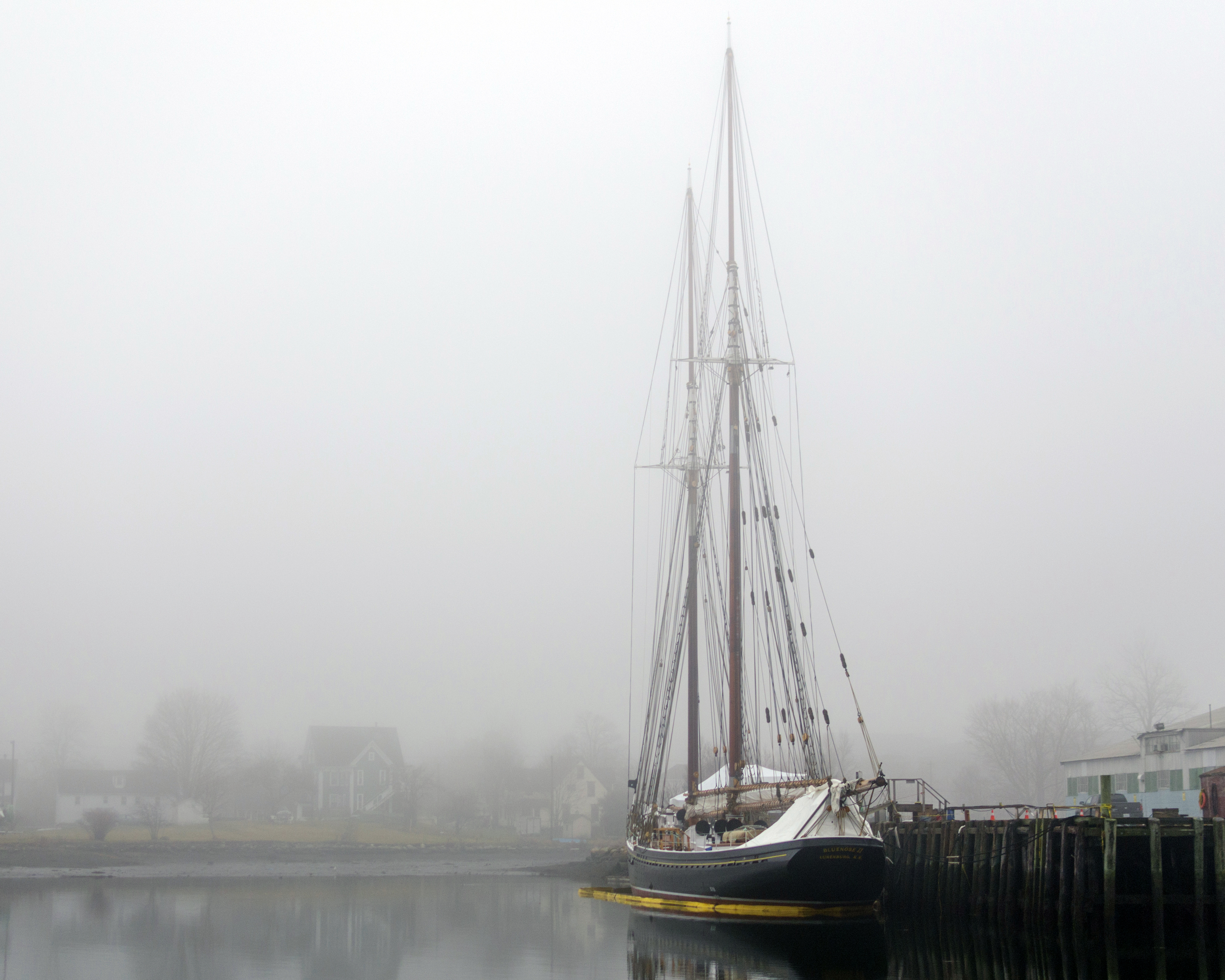
Bluenose II moored in Lunenburg Harbour on 18 January 2014 during the vessel's post-reconstruction modification period

After more than 25 months of reconstruction, the partially completed hull of Bluenose II was relaunched into Lunenburg Harbor on 29 September 2012 from the Lunenburg marine railway followed by festivities at the nearby Fisheries Museum of the Atlantic, however due to repairs not completed, the vessel was pulled back onto land for more work. The vessel was returned to the water on 6 September 2013 to undergo dock and sea trials before being handed over to the province for tourist duty. Retrofit costs had risen to $19 million and the vessel still required modifications to its steering mechanism which proved unreliable and difficult to operate.

In the summer of 2016, Bluenose II renovations were completed, two years behind schedule with the final cost reaching $24 million. A report by the Nova Scotia Auditor General blamed mismanagement and inexperience by the province's Department of Culture and Heritage.

== Stewardship and mission ==
Bluenose II spends much of the year tied up at the Fisheries Museum of the Atlantic wharf in its home port of Old Town Lunenburg, Nova Scotia, a UNESCO World Heritage site and origin of its predecessor. Funds for the operation of the ship are raised through charging for passage on the vessel, public donations, and sales in the Bluenose II Company Store Gift Shop (in Lunenburg), run by the Lunenburg Marine Museum Society.

The schooner's mission is "to continuously promote the history and legacy of Bluenose and Bluenose II as well as the rich past and present of Lunenburg and Atlantic Canada." In this capacity, during summer months Bluenose II tours the Atlantic seaboard and the Gulf of St. Lawrence, routinely stopping in ports across Nova Scotia, as well as Quebec City, Montreal, Toronto and many ports of call in the United States, serving as a goodwill ambassador and promoting Nova Scotia tourism. Bluenose II has also travelled further afield, such as in 1986 when it participated in the Vancouver World's Fair. Summer activities include onboard tours, harbour cruises and deckhand experiences, as well as outreach for schools and youth groups in Nova Scotia.

In the summer of 2020, due to the COVID-19 pandemic lockdown, Bluenose II restricted its summer tour to Nova Scotia ports. The schooner's 20-person crew formed a Bluenose quarantine bubble for training, maintenance and sailing, and its visits to ports aside from Lunenburg were restricted to at-anchors or sail-pasts.

== See also ==
- List of museum ships
- List of schooners
- Museum ship
- Ship replica
- Ships preserved in museums
