= Bluenose =

Unbeaten racing schooner

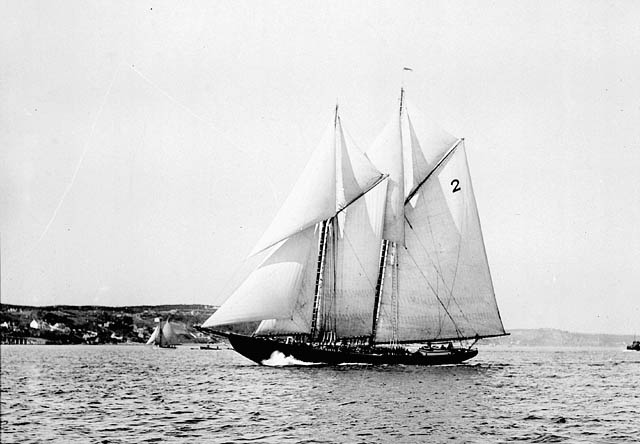
- Bluenose sailing in 1921

History
- Name: Bluenose
- Port of registry: (Canada) Lunenburg, Nova Scotia
- Builder: Smith and Rhuland
- Launched: 26 March 1921
- In service: April 1921
- Out of service: 1946
- Fate: Foundered on reef, 28 January 1946, off Île-à-Vache, Haiti

General characteristics
- Type: Schooner
- Displacement: 258 t (254 long tons)
- Length: 43.6 m (143 ft 1 in) o/a; 34.1 m (111 ft 11 in) lwl
- Beam: 8.2 m (26 ft 11 in)
- Draught: 4.85 m (15 ft 11 in)
- Mainmast, height from deck: 38.4 m (126 ft 0 in)
- Foremast, height from deck: 31.3 m (102 ft 8 in)
- Sail area: 930 m^{2} (10,000 sq ft)
- Mainsail area: 386 m^{2} (4,150 sq ft)
- Crew: 20

Bluenose was a fishing and racing gaff rig schooner built in 1921 in Lunenburg, Nova Scotia, Canada. A celebrated racing ship and fishing vessel, Bluenose under the command of Angus Walters, became a provincial icon for Nova Scotia and an important Canadian symbol in the 1930s, serving as a working vessel until she was wrecked in 1946. Nicknamed the "Queen of the North Atlantic", she was later commemorated by the Bluenose one-design sloop (1946) and a replica, Bluenose II (1963). The name Bluenose originated as a nickname for Nova Scotians from as early as the late 18th century.

== Design and description ==
Bluenose was designed by William James Roué, and intended for both fishing and racing. Built to compete with schooners from the United States for speed, the design that Roué originally drafted in late 1920 had a waterline length of 36.6 metres (120 ft 1 in) which was 2.4 metres (7 ft 10 in) too long for the competition. Sent back to redesign the schooner, Roué produced a revised outline. The accepted revision placed the inside ballast on top of the keel to ensure that it was as low as possible, improving the overall speed of the vessel. One further alteration to the revised design took place during construction. The bow was raised by 0.5 metres (1 ft 8 in) to allow more room in the forecastle for the crew to eat and sleep. The alteration was approved of by Roué. The change increased the sheer in the vessel's bow, giving the schooner a unique appearance.

The plans, that were accepted and later built, was a combination of the designs from shipbuilders in the United States and Nova Scotia that had been previously built for the North Atlantic fishing fleet. The vessel was built of Nova Scotian pine, spruce, birch and oak and the masts were created from Douglas fir. Bluenose had a displacement of 258 tonnes (254 long tons) and was 43.6 metres (143 ft 1 in) long overall and 34.1 metres (111 ft 11 in) at the waterline. The vessel had a beam of 8.2 metres (26 ft 11 in) and a draught of 4.85 metres (15 ft 11 in).

The schooner carried 930 square metres (10,000 sq ft) of sail. Bluenose's mainmast reached 38.4 metres (126 ft 0 in) above deck and the schooner's foremast reached 31.3 metres (102 ft 8 in). Her mainboom was 24.7 metres (81 ft 0 in) and the schooner's foreboom was 9.9 metres (32 ft 6 in). The vessel had a crew of 20 and her hull was painted black. The vessel cost $35,000 to build. (Note: Adjusted for inflation to 2026 dollars, $574,700.)

== Career ==
Bluenose was constructed by Smith and Rhuland in Lunenburg, Nova Scotia. The schooner's keel was laid in 1920. The Governor General the Duke of Devonshire drove a golden spike into the timber during the keel-laying ceremony. She was launched on 26 March 1921, and christened by Audrey Smith, daughter of the shipbuilder Richard Smith. She was built to be a racing ship and fishing vessel, in response to the defeat of the Nova Scotian fishing schooner Delawana by the Gloucester, Massachusetts, fishing schooner Esperanto in 1920, in a race sponsored by the Halifax Herald newspaper.

Bluenose was completed in April 1921 and performed her sea trials out of Lunenburg. On 15 April, the schooner departed to fish for the first time. Bluenose, being a Lunenburg schooner, used the dory trawl method. Lunenburg schooners carried eight dories, each manned by two members of the crew, called dorymen. From the dories, lines of strong twine up to 2.5 kilometres (1.6 mi) long which had 0.91-metre (3 ft) lines with hooks on the end spaced every 3 metres (9.8 ft) were released, supported at either end by buoys which acted as markers. The dorymen would haul in the catch and then return to the ship. This was done up to four times a day. The fishing season stretched from April to September and schooners stayed up to eight weeks at a time or until their holds were full.

Bluenose's captain and part owner for most of her fishing and racing career was Angus Walters. As Walters only had master's papers for home waters, Bluenose in some international races was sometimes under the command of the deep sea Lunenburg captain George Myra until the schooner reached the racing port. The crew of Bluenose during her fishing career were mostly from Lunenburg but also included several Newfoundlanders. Crew were paid either by the size of the catch when they returned to port or some took a share in the vessel, known as a "sixty-fourth".

=== Racing ===
Bluenose vs. Gertrude L. Thebaud, International Fishermen's Cup, 1938, final race

After a season fishing on the Grand Banks of Newfoundland under the command of Angus Walters, Bluenose set out to take part in her first International Fisherman's Cup. The International Fisherman's Cup was awarded to the fastest fishing schooner that worked in the North Atlantic deepsea fishing industry. The fastest schooner had to win two out of three races in order to claim the trophy. The Canadian elimination race to determine who would represent Canada in the 1921 International Fishermen's Trophy race off Halifax, Nova Scotia took place in early October. A best two-out-of-three competition, Bluenose won the first two races easily. Bluenose then defeated the American challenger Elsie, for the International Fishermen's Trophy, returning it to Nova Scotia in October 1921. The following year, Bluenose defeated the American challenger Henry S. Ford, this time in American waters off Gloucester. Henry S. Ford had been constructed in 1921 based on a design intended to defeat Bluenose.

In 1923, Bluenose faced Columbia, another American yacht newly designed and constructed to defeat the Canadian schooner. The International Fishermen's Trophy race was held off Halifax in 1923 and new rules were put in place preventing ships from passing marker buoys to landward. During the first race, the two schooners duelled inshore, the rigging of the vessels coming together. However, Bluenose won the first race. During the second race, Bluenose broke the new rule and was declared to have lost the race. Angus Walters protested the decision and demanded that no vessel be declared winner. The judging committee rejected his protest, which led Walters to remove Bluenose from the competition. The committee declared the competition a tie, and the two vessels shared the prize money and the title. The anger over the events led to an eight-year hiatus in the race.

In 1925, a group of Halifax businessmen ordered the construction of a schooner designed to defeat Bluenose. Haligonian was launched that year and a race was organized between the two ships. However, while returning to port with her catch, Haligonian ran aground in the Strait of Canso. The vessel required repairs and the race with Bluenose was cancelled. In 1926, a new race was organized, which Bluenose won easily. A new American schooner was designed and built in 1929–1930 to defeat Bluenose, Gertrude L. Thebaud. She was the last schooner of her type constructed for the fishing fleet in Gloucester. In 1930 off Gloucester, Massachusetts, Bluenose was defeated 2–0 in the inaugural Sir Thomas Lipton International Fishing Challenge Cup. The second race was controversial, as it was called off due to weather issues both times Bluenose took the lead. The following year, Gertrude L. Thebaud challenged Bluenose for the International Fisherman's Trophy. Bluenose won handily, beating the American schooner in both races.

Fishing schooners became obsolete during the 1930s, displaced by motor schooners and trawlers. Salt cod, the main fishing industry in the North Atlantic had been surpassed by the fresh fish industry requiring faster vessels. In 1933, Bluenose was invited to the World's Fair in Chicago, stopping in Toronto on her return voyage. In 1935, Bluenose sailed to Plymouth after being invited as part of the Silver Jubilee of King George V. During her visit, she took part in a race with schooner-yachts, specifically designed for racing. Bluenose came third. On her return trip to Nova Scotia, Bluenose encountered a strong gale that lasted for three days. Enough damage was done to the schooner that Bluenose was forced to return to Plymouth to effect repairs. She was made seaworthy enough to sail to Lunenburg where further repairs were done. In 1936, Bluenose had diesel engines installed and topmasts removed to allow the schooner to remain on the fishing grounds year-round.

In 1937, Bluenose was challenged once more by the American schooner Gertrude L. Thebaud in a best-of-five series of races for the International Fisherman's Trophy. However, the financial difficulties of the owners of Bluenose almost prevented the race from going ahead. Furthermore, Bluenose's sailing gear had been placed in storage after the schooner had been refitted with diesel engines. It was only with the intervention of American private interests that Bluenose was made ready for the race. Beginning on 9 October 1938, the first race, off Boston, was won by Gertrude L. Thebaud. Bluenose won the second which was sailed off Gloucester, but a protest over the ballast aboard Bluenose led to modifications to the schooner. She was found to be too long at the waterline for the competition. The alterations completed, Bluenose won the third race sailed off Gloucester, by an even greater margin than the second race. During the fourth race sailed off Boston, the topmast of Bluenose snapped, which contributed to Gertrude L. Thebaud's win. The fifth race, sailed off Gloucester was won by Bluenose, retaining the trophy for the Nova Scotians. This was the last race of the fishing schooners of the North Atlantic.

=== Coastal trade and fate ===
During World War II, Bluenose remained at dock in Lunenburg. No longer profitable, the vessel was sold to the West Indies Trading Company in 1942. The vessel was once again stripped of masts and rigging and converted into a coastal freighter for work in the Caribbean Sea, carrying various cargoes between the islands. Laden with bananas, she struck a coral reef off Île à Vache, Haiti, on 28 January 1946. Wrecked beyond repair, with no loss of life, the schooner was abandoned on the reef. The vessel broke apart on the reef.

Various divers and film makers have claimed to have found the wreck of Bluenose, most recently in June 2005 by divers from the Caribbean Marine Institute searching for Henry Morgan's ship HMS Oxford. However, the large number of wrecks on the reef at Île à Vache and the scattered condition of the wreckage has made identification difficult.

== Fame and commemoration ==
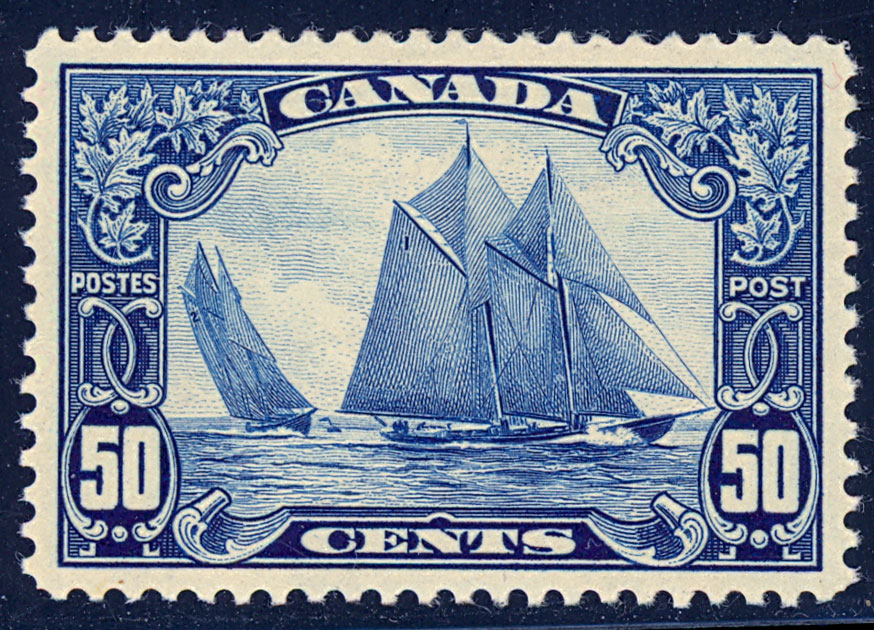
Bluenose postage stamp of 1929

Bluenose, under full sail, is portrayed on the Bluenose postage stamp 50-cent issued by the Canadian government on 6 January 1929. Bluenose has been featured on a 1982 60-cent stamp that commemorated the International Philatelic Youth Exhibition. Bluenose is featured on a 1988 37-cent issue that celebrated Bluenose skipper Angus Walters. The Bluenose stamp is the MacGuffin of Tommy Tricker and the Stamp Traveller, a 1988 fantasy movie about young stamp collectors.

Bluenose also appears on the current Nova Scotia license plate. The fishing schooner on the Canadian dime, added in 1937 at the height of fame for Bluenose, was actually based on a composite image of Bluenose and two other schooners, but has for years been commonly known as Bluenose. In 2002, the government of Canada declared the depiction on the dime to be Bluenose.

Bluenose appears on a 2021 commemorative silver dollar issued by the Royal Canadian Mint, in honour of its centennial. The obverse of the coin depicts King George V, who was Canada's head of state in 1921.

Bluenose and her captain, Angus Walters, were included into the Canadian Sports Hall of Fame in 1955, making her the first and only non-human inductee until 1960, when she was joined by Canadian hydroplane champion Miss Supertest III. That same year another honour was bestowed upon the sailing ship when a new Canadian National Railways passenger-vehicle ferry for the inaugural Yarmouth–Bar Harbor service was launched as MV Bluenose.

Canadian folk singer Stan Rogers wrote a song entitled "Bluenose" celebrating the ship. It appears on his albums Turnaround and Home in Halifax (live).

== Legacy ==
=== Bluenose II ===
Bluenose II, in Lunenburg Bay, Nova Scotia, Canada

In 1963, a replica of Bluenose was built at Lunenburg using the original Bluenose plans and named Bluenose II. The replica was built by Smith and Rhuland, sponsored by the Oland Company. It was used as a marketing tool for the Oland Brewery Schooner Lager beer brand and as a pleasure yacht for the Oland family. Bluenose II was sold to the government of Nova Scotia in 1971 for the sum of $1 or 10 Canadian dimes. The replica schooner is used for tourism promotion as a "sailing ambassador". In honour of her predecessor's racing record, Bluenose II does not officially race. The replica has undergone several refits to extend her life. This vessel was decommissioned and dismantled in 2010, and an entirely new Bluenose (also named Bluenose II, since Transport Canada deemed it a "reconstruction") was built as close to the original schooner deemed necessary and launched in Lunenburg in 2013. Various subcomponents for this Bluenose II project were supplied from notable firms including the ships keel at Snyder's Shipyard in Dayspring, the ships backbone of laminated ribs at Covey Island Boatworks in Riverport and assembly of the vessel in Lunenburg. Much controversy has surrounded the vessel due to overspending on the "refit". After further repairs, ownership of the restored Bluenose II was returned to the province of Nova Scotia and she began a tour of Nova Scotia ports in the summer of 2015.

Bluenose II spends much of the year tied up at the Lunenburg Foundry wharf in its home port of Old Town Lunenburg, Nova Scotia, a UNESCO World Heritage site and origin of its predecessor. In the summer, the schooner tours the Atlantic seaboard and the Gulf of St. Lawrence, routinely stopping in ports across Nova Scotia, as well as Montreal, Quebec City and many ports of call in the United States, serving as a goodwill ambassador and promoting tourism in Nova Scotia. In the summer months, the schooner also offers onboard tours and harbour cruises.

In mid-2020, due to the COVID-19 pandemic lockdown, Bluenose II restricted its summer tour to Nova Scotia ports. The schooner's 20-person crew formed a Bluenose quarantine bubble for training, maintenance and sailing, and its visits to ports aside from Lunenburg were restricted to at-anchors or sail-pasts.

=== Bluenose IV ===
In 2007, Joan Roué, the great-granddaughter of Bluenose designer William Roué, started raising funds to build a new Bluenose. She cited the need for a new ambassador for Nova Scotia and Canada, listing the particulars at a Bluenose IV website. The name Bluenose III is owned by the province of Nova Scotia, and Roué could not reach an agreement for its use on the new schooner; Roué and North Atlantic Enterprises proceeded anyway, under the name Bluenose IV. An agreement was reached with Snyder's Shipyard to build the new replica when fundraising was completed. However, as of 2009, Roué had not succeeded in raising the required funds. The effort came to an end when the province of Nova Scotia and the Canadian federal government constructed the new Bluenose II in 2013.

== See also ==
- List of schooners
