= Sidney Culverwell Oland =

Philanthropist in Nova Scotia (1886–1977)

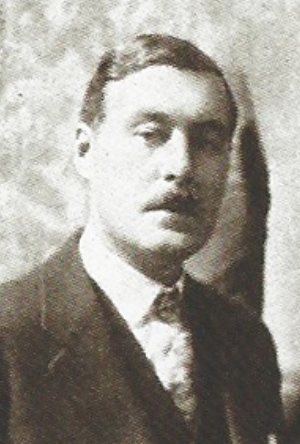
Sidney Culverwell Oland

Sidney Culverwell Oland (17 June 1886, Dartmouth, Nova Scotia – 17 November 1977, Halifax, Nova Scotia) was a member of the Oland family, owner of Oland Brewery, and philanthropist. He made significant contributions to the military, the arts and the cultural life of Nova Scotia. He commissioned the building of Bluenose II and donated it to the province. He also donated a fountain to the city of Halifax in memory of his wife, which is located in Victoria Park, Halifax, Nova Scotia.

== Sailing ==
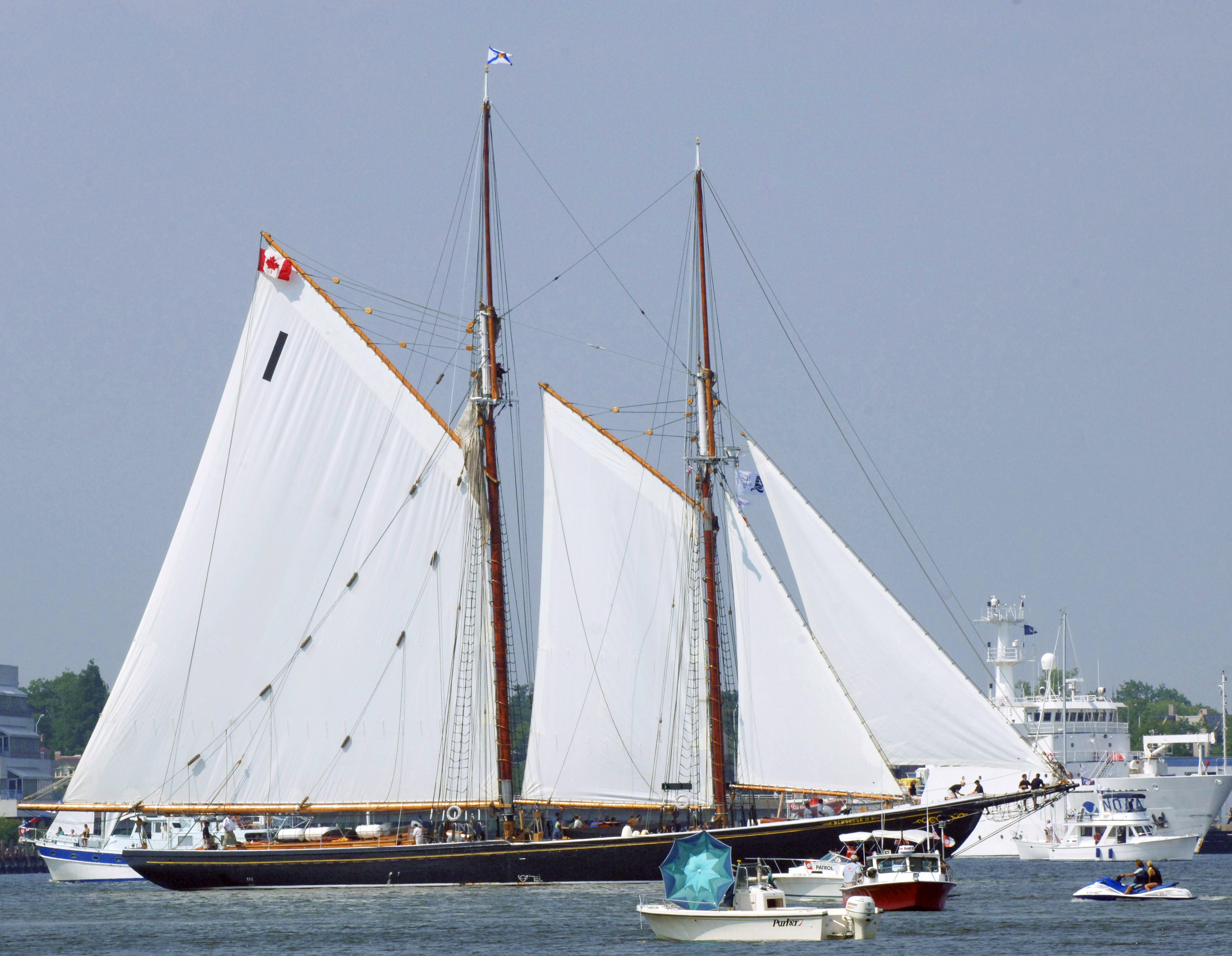
Oland commissioned the building of Bluenose II

Oland's interest in sailing began with the purchase of a sloop-yacht named Lady Betty that he sailed in local races and fishing trips. He later sailed his ninety-foot schooner Nomad and later the 70 foot motor cruiser Lady Betty 2.

He became the Commodore of the Royal Nova Scotia Yacht Squadron.

He built the Bluenose 2 in 1963 for $300,000 (2.4 million in 2018) and sold it to the province of Nova Scotia for $1.00.

== Military ==
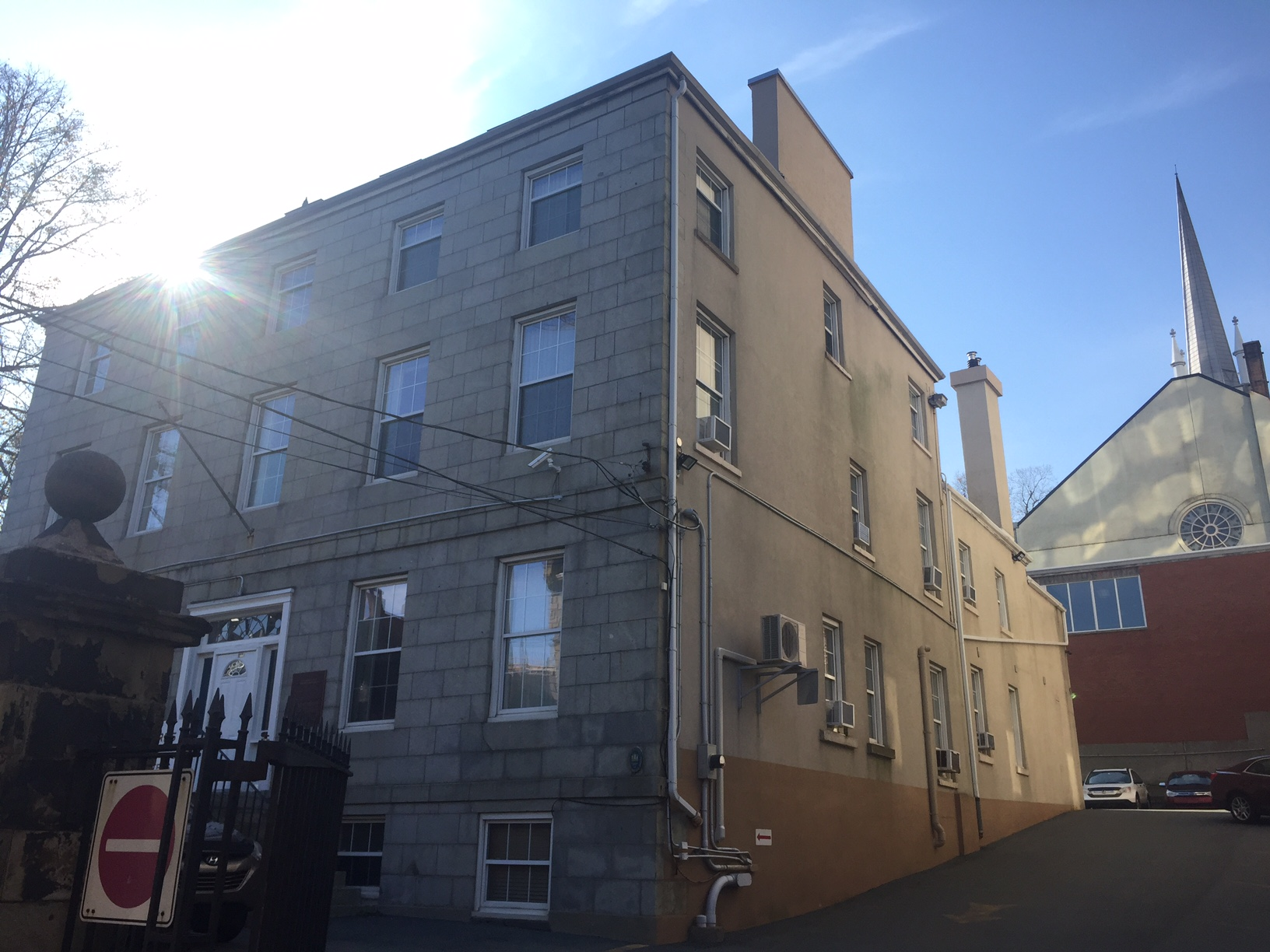
Oland purchased and renovated Black-Binney House, Halifax, Nova Scotia (St. Matthew's Church in background)

During World War 1, Oland commanded the 6th Battery at Fort McNab on McNabs Island. He went to France as Commander of the 66th Battery, C.F. A, the 144th Brigade, CFA and the 1st. He fought in the Battle of Passchendaele in 1917 and the Battle of Amiens. He was mentioned in the dispatches signed by Winston Churchill.

In 1937, he organized the Nova Scotia Division of the Canadian Corps of Commissionaires. In 1965, he acquired and renovated the Black-Binney House to serve as the Headquarters for the Corps in Nova Scotia.

== The arts ==
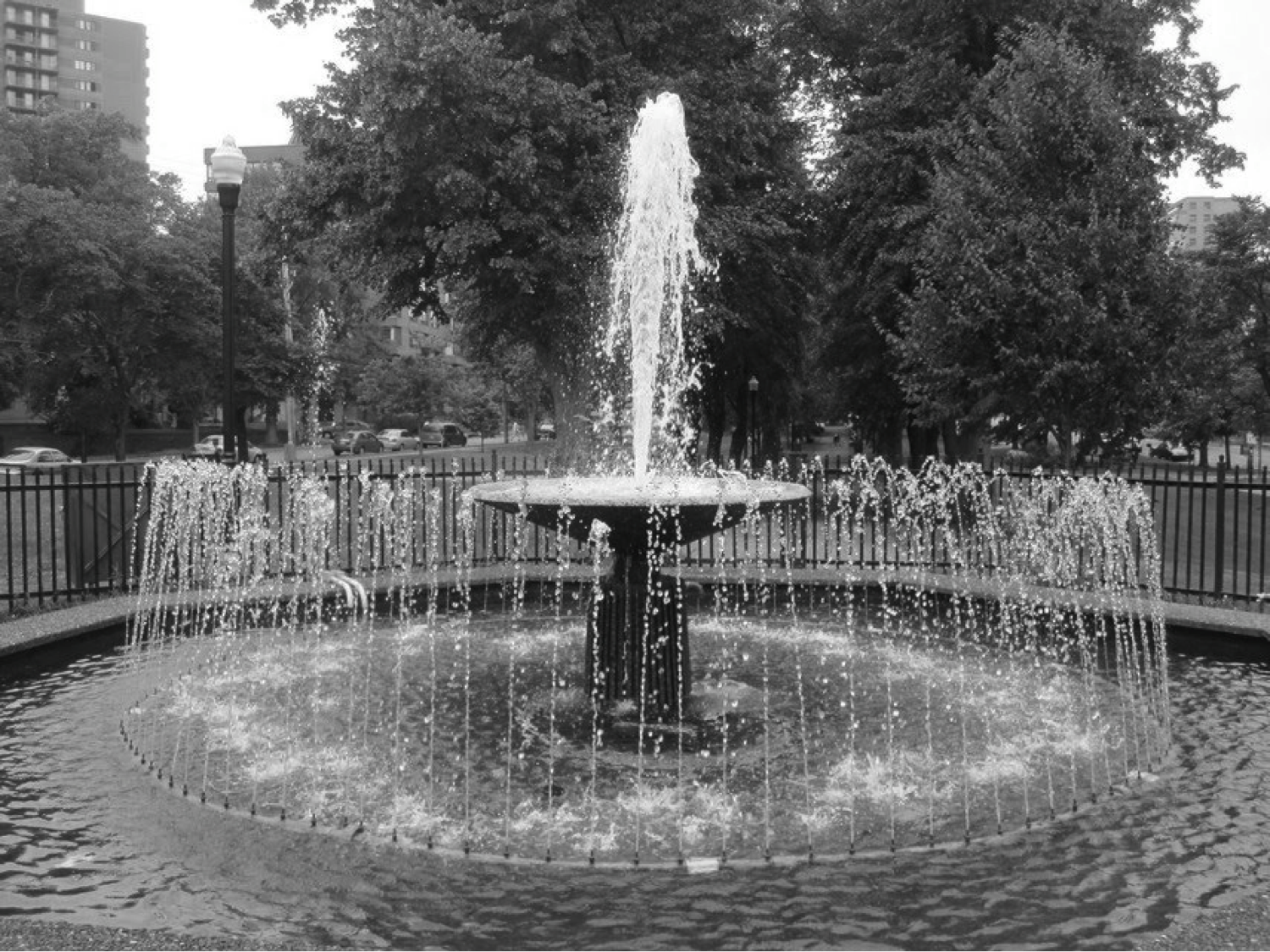
Oland Memorial Fountain to his wife (1966), Victoria Park, Halifax, Nova Scotia

Between 1923 and 1925, while prohibition was enforced, Oland went to Hollywood, California, acting and directing silent films. He was friends with Lillian Gish, Mary Pickford, and Tallulah Bankhead. He played a small part in All Quiet on the Western Front (1930 film). He would later become the founding director of The Theatre Arts Guild (1931). He was instrumental in establishing Neptune Theatre (1963) in Halifax, Nova Scotia. He also was a director for the National Gallery of Canada in Ottawa.

== Brewery ==
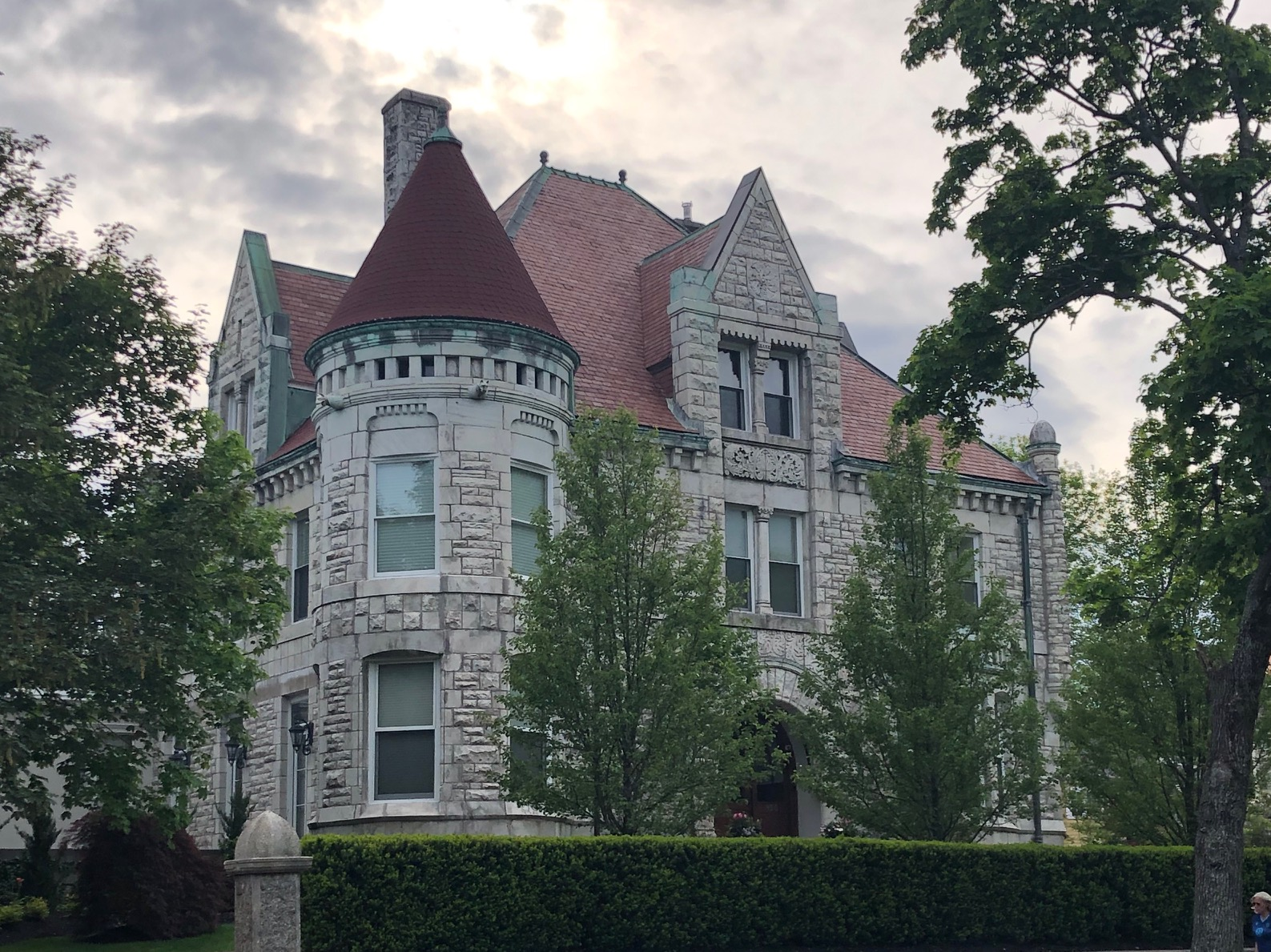
Oland House, Richardsonian Romanesque architecture, Halifax, Nova Scotia

Oland was educated in beer making at the United States Brewers’ Academy in New York. He and his father purchased a brewery in Halifax in 1907 and named it Oland and Son Limited. The Brewery was located in Dartmouth and was destroyed in the Halifax Explosion. Upon his father's death, Oland became the President of Oland and Son Limited (1933) and president of A. Keith and Son Limited, which they acquired in 1927.
