= Classic stamp =

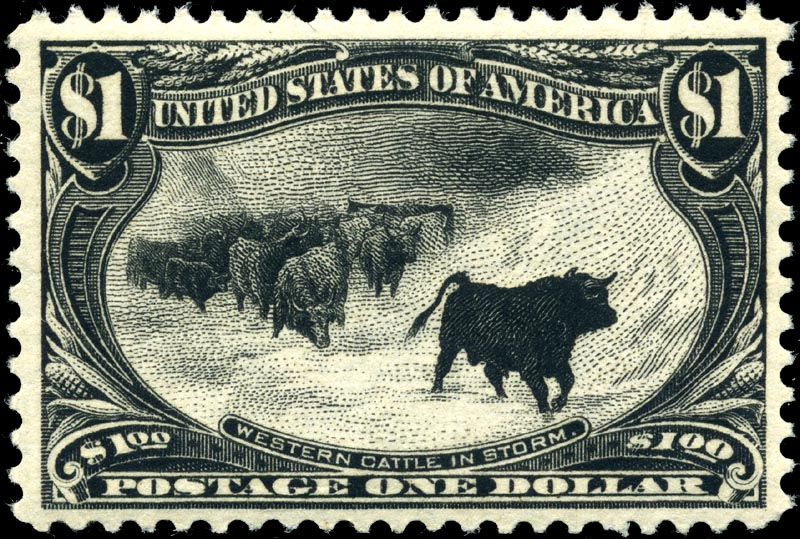
The 1-dollar Western Cattle in Storm of the 1898 Trans-Mississippi issue (Scott # 292) is considered one of the great classic stamps.

A classic stamp is a postage stamp of a type considered distinctive by philatelists, typically applied to stamps printed in the early period of stamp production, e.g., before about 1870. However, as L. N. Williams puts it, "the term has never been satisfactorily defined". Definitions have included stamps issued before 1900, although not all stamps issued before 1900 are considered "classic", while some stamps issued in the first few years after 1900 are considered "classic." Williams suggests that the classic period extends from 1840 to 1875, and James A. Mackay, in his World of Classic Stamps, New York (1972) applied the term to stamps produced from 1840 to 1870. Other collectors consider the classics cover regular issues to 1869, but include the re-issues of 1875. The U.S. Philatelic Classics Society (USPCS) is a society dedicated to the study of United States postal issues and postal history from the stampless era up to 1893.

To some extent it conveys collectors' prejudices for or against particular countries or specialties. For instance, the Canadian stamps of the 1930s are highly regarded for their design and production quality, and are routinely called "classics"; but the term is much less likely to be used of the US stamps of the same period, and very few would characterize the poorly printed Mexican stamps of the 1930s as "classic", even though Mexico's first stamps, the Hidalgo issue, are equally poor but always considered classics.
