= Esperanto (schooner) =

History
- Name: Esperanto
- Builder: James and Tarr Shipbuilders
- Launched: June 27, 1906
- Honors and awards: International Fisherman's Cup
- Fate: Sunk

General characteristics
- Length: 107 feet (33 m)
- Beam: 25 feet (7.6 m)
- Draft: 11 feet (3.4 m)

Esperanto was a fishing schooner based in Gloucester, Massachusetts.

Esperanto was designed by Thomas F. McManus of Boston and built by James and Tarr Shipbuilders of Essex, Massachusetts. She was launched on June 27, 1906, and measured 107 feet (33 m) in length, 25 feet (7.6 m) in beam, and a draft of 11 feet (3.4 m) with gross register tonnage of 140.

The Esperanto was used in several races and is one of only two undefeated champions at the International Fisherman's Cup.

== International Fisherman's Cup, 1920 ==
Under command of Captain Martin Leander Welch, Esperanto became the first winner of the International Fisherman's Cup on November 1, 1920, when she beat the Canadian fishing schooner Delawana of Riverport under command of Capt. Thomas Himmelman. In the next race, in 1921, the Canadian sailing ship Bluenose, built in Lunenburg after the model of Esperanto, won against the schooner Elsie from Gloucester, Massachusetts.

Her crew for the 1920 race included:

- Captain Martin Leander Welch
- R. Russell Smith, Gorton-Pew Fisheries Co.
- Isaiah Gosbee, Cook
- George E. Roberts
- Harry P. Christianson
- George Young
- Benjamin W. Stanley
- Roy P. Patten
- Raymond "Rusty" McKenzie
- James McDonald
- Wallace Bruce
- John Batt
- John F. Barrett
- Thomas Smith
- Michael J. Hall, Masthead man
- Stephen F. Whitney
- Hugh Young
- Benjamin H. Colby
- James B. Connolly, Writer
- John J. Matheson, Mate
- Thomas S. Benham
- Leon G. Murray
- Lawrence F. Percival
- Ernest Hendrie
- Robert W. Sawtell
- Morril Wiggins

== Sinking ==
On May 30, 1921, Esperanto struck a submerged wreck near Sable Island and sank. The crew was rescued.
