= Angus Walters =

Canadian sailor and first captain of Bluenose

Angus James Walters
- Walters with International Fisherman's Trophy
- Born: 9 June 1881; Lunenburg, Nova Scotia
- Died: 11 August 1968 (aged 87); Lunenburg, Nova Scotia
- Known for: First captain of Bluenose

Angus James Walters (9 June 1881 – 11 August 1968) was a sailor and sea captain who skippered the famed Grand Banks fishing schooner Bluenose from 1921 to 1938. Walters captained Bluenose to five international sailing championships, and was undefeated for seventeen years.

== Childhood and early life at sea ==
Angus Walters was born in Lunenburg, Nova Scotia, a fishing community, located on the south shore of Nova Scotia. He was one of twelve children of Adelaide (Lohnes) and Captain Frederick Elias Walters, a fisherman and captain of the schooner Nyanza. At age fourteen, in 1895, Walters started his career as a fisherman on his father's boat. He started as a "throater" where he was responsible for grabbing fish, cutting their throats and slicing the belly down to the tail. His career also led him to learning about life at sea as a "header" and a "doryman." Walters sailed on his father's ship for two years until she sank off the Magdalen Islands.

== Early life as a captain ==
In 1905, at the age of twenty-three, Walters became captain of his first schooner, the Minnie M. Cook. He became known for the speed at which he completed voyages. In 1908 he launched his own boat, the Muriel B. Walter, named after his sister. He remained captain of this ship for eight years. World War I made the life of a fisherman very difficult. Walters sold the Muriel B. Walters and bought the Donald Silver. He then bought the larger Gilbert B. Walters, named after his sons. On this ship he set a record for the largest catch of halibut.

== Racing and later life as a captain ==
There was a friendly rivalry between fisherman of different areas to determine who was the fastest. In 1920, the first International Fishermen's Race was held between fishermen of Gloucester, Massachusetts and Lunenburg, Nova Scotia. Unfortunately, Walter's schooner broke a mast and he lost the trial for the race. After that a group of Halifax businessmen, wanting to give Canada a better chance to win, established a racing committee. They approached William J. Roue, a Halifax marine architect to design a ship. Walters was approached to be the captain. Shipbuilders Smith and Rhuland were chosen to build Bluenose. On 26 March 1921, Bluenose was launched. On 6 October 1921, the first race was held and Walters led Bluenose to victory. He was now in a position to represent Canada in the Second International Fishermen's Race. Bluenose won and continued to win five international titles under Walter's command.

In the hard times of the Great Depression, Bluenose was a great source of pride for Nova Scotians and Canadians. Walters' success on Bluenose provided opportunities he might not have had otherwise. In 1933 Bluenose was invited to represent Canada at the Century of Progress Exhibition in Chicago, after which he took Bluenose to Toronto where it was a popular display for two seasons.

Walters had master's papers for home trade at the beginning of her career, so for some international races he invited George Myra, a deep sea Lunenburg captain and friend to command Bluenose in international waters until the schooner reached the racing port.

In 1935 Walters was invited to take part in the Silver Jubilee of King George V and Queen Mary of England. Walters sailed to Plymouth, England in 17 days. Walters was met with great enthusiasm and was presented with a piece of sail from the Royal Yacht Britannia and presented to the King. On the voyage home, Bluenose ran into a terrible storm. The boat almost over turned, and Walters was forced to turn back to Plymouth for repairs.

Nova Scotian fishermen choose Walters as leader of the Nova Scotia Fishermen's Federation during important union negotiations with government and fishing companies in 1938 and 1939.

== Family life and his ventures after his life at sea ==
Walters had 3 children with his wife Maggie: Gilbert, Bernard and Stewart, none of whom became fishermen. But his grandson, Wayne Walters, followed Angus to the sea as captain of Bluenose II.

In 1937, Walters' wife died after a lingering illness. In 1938 he met Mildred Butler, the woman who would become his second wife. He sailed Bluenose in one final regatta that year, against the American Gertrude L. Thebaud under Captain Ben Pine. Walters; Bluenose won three of the five races and both could retire undefeated. Walters married his second wife Mildred Butler December 15, 1938. Walters retired from sailing, and they started a dairy business in Lunenburg, where Walters became a town councillor. In the 1941 election, Walters attempted to enter provincial politics as a Conservative candidate in the dual member Lunenburg County riding, but was defeated. In 1955, Walters was among the first inductees into the Canadian Sports Hall of Fame. Walter's wife Mildred died at the age of 45 in 1957.

== Bluenose II ==
In 1963, the Olands funded the building of a replica of the original Bluenose. Many of the builders of the original ship were employed to build the replica. Walters helped to drive the symbolic golden spike at the start of construction and was consulted at every stage of the building of the ship. The ship was launched on 24 July 1963 before a crowd of 50,000. Walters was on board the ship and at the age of 82 took the new ship on its first voyage to the West Indies.

== Death ==
Walters died 11 August 1968 at the age of 87. He is buried in Hillcrest Cemetery, Lunenburg.

== Awards and honours ==
In 2005, Walters was posthumously named a Person of National Historic Significance.
