= Oland (disambiguation) =

Oland, Öland or Øland may refer to:

- Öland, a Swedish island in the Baltic Sea
  - County of Öland, a former county of Sweden containing the island of Öland
- Åland, an autonomous archipelago in the Baltic Sea belonging to Finland
- Oland (Frisian island), a German island belonging to the North Frisian group
- Oland Brewery, a brewery in Halifax, Nova Scotia, Canada
- Oland Hundred, a district of Uppland, Sweden
- HSwMS Öland (J16), a destroyer in the Swedish Navy

== As a surname ==
- Anne Øland (1949–2015), a Danish pianist,
- Philip Oland (1910–1996), a Canadian businessman
- Richard Oland (1941–2011), a Canadian businessman
- Victor de Bedia Oland (1913–1983), a Canadian politician
- Warner Oland (1879–1938), a Swedish actor
