= Oland family =

Canadian family

The Oland family is a prominent Maritime family located mostly in Nova Scotia and New Brunswick, Canada. Members of the family have been prominent in business and politics, founding the eponymous Oland Brewery and Moosehead Breweries.

== History ==
In 1862, John James Dunn Oland immigrated from Hawley, England to Nova Scotia, Canada, leaving his wife Susannah to tend the family farm. He was employed with the Nova Scotia Railway, a part of the intercontinental railway project and she brewed beer. Within three years, the family was reunited in Canada and rented a house in Dartmouth, where Susannah set up her brewing operation in the garden shed behind their home.

Captain Francis de Winton, a friend of the family, suggested that they market Susannah's "Brown October Ale" and John, whose time with the railway had ended, agreed. On 14 August 1867 the business was incorporated with John designated as manager, places set aside for three of his sons, with funds provided by de Winton, George Harvey and Thomas Mowbray. Because they started the business in the Turtle Grove District of Dartmouth, it was called the Turtle Grove Brewery. Within a short time, there were nine employees and the business was the third largest operating in Dartmouth.

John Culverwell and Conrad George Oland, sons of John, served with the 1st Halifax Garrison Artillery during the Fenian Raids.

When John died in a riding accident on 20 October 1870 Susannah Oland was left with no control over the brewery. Compounding matters, de Winton had been transferred to Gibraltar and the other two partners sold their interests to a manager, George Fraser, who had formerly been employed with a competing firm. Undaunted, Oland continued working at the brewery, which had been renamed the Army and Navy Brewery, in honor of their biggest patrons. For eight years, the business operated under that name, though it was destroyed and rebuilt twice because of fire.

In 1877, after receiving an inheritance from a relative in England, Susannah Oland bought out Fraser and published a notice of the partnership's dissolution in a Halifax newspaper. She began operating the brewery under the name, S. Oland, Sons and Company, training her sons to be brewmasters.

In 1886, Susannah Oland died, and the company went to her sons, John Culverwell, Conrad, and George W. C. Oland. In 1893, the company changed its name to the Maritime Brewing & Malting Co. with John as president and George as vice president and managing director.

Beginning in 1879, John C. Oland was elected as an alderman for Dartmouth, and from 1892 to 1894 served as Mayor of the town. His great nephew, Victor Oland, would later serve as the Lieutenant-Governor of Nova Scotia.

George Bauld Oland, son of George W. C., and John Culverwell Oland Jr both served in the Second Boer War, and in 1904 John C. Jr died of illness contracted in South Africa.

The company faced hard times once again when the Halifax Explosion of 1917 killed Conrad Oland and destroyed the brewery. Four of George W. C.’s sons: George B., Sidney C., John, and Richard served during the First World War in the Canadian Army and Navy.

In 1918, George W. C. Oland and his sons moved to Halifax and bought another brewery. In 1928, George bought a second, larger brewery in the city of Saint John, New Brunswick, site of the present day Moosehead facility. In 1931, the symbol of the moose came into existence as George launched Moosehead Pale Ale. After the success of its Pale Ale, the Oland-owned brewery changed its name to Moosehead Breweries Ltd. in 1947.

George's death in 1933 caused a rift in the family due to him owning or controlling four separate brewing companies, two in Halifax and two in Saint John, in all of which he was president. Fearful of the implications for brand identification, such as loss of consumer confidence and reduced market share, Oland never consolidated the companies into one entity. An unequal division of the breweries among those three of his sons directly involved in the family business – George B., Sidney C., and Geoffrey resulted in a bitter struggle for supremacy between George B. in Saint John and Sidney in Halifax. The brothers divided the brewery empire between them, George taking New Brunswick and Sidney taking Nova Scotia. The ramifications of their father's well-intentioned but ill-conceived attempt to avoid a war of succession would persist until 1971, when the Halifax Olands, under the control of Sidney's son Bruce, sold out to the Ontario-based Labatt Brewing Company.

In 1978, the New Brunswick-based brewery president Philip Oland expanded the brand and launched Moosehead Lager in the United States. In 1982, Derek Oland, then the president of the company (after succeeding his father P.W. Oland), expanded the company worldwide.

In 2008, Derek Oland's sons Andrew, Patrick, and Matthew assumed leadership of Moosehead. As of 2019, Andrew is the president and Patrick is the CFO. Matthew has assumed the role of CEO of Joint Venture, a collaboration between Sproutly and Moosehead to sell cannabis-infused beverages.

== Prominent members ==
- Susannah Oland - immigrated to Nova Scotia from England with her husband and family in 1865. Founded the Oland brewery with her husband John James Dunn Oland.
- Sidney Culverwell Oland - son of George W. C. Oland, and grandson of Susannah and John Oland. Military officer and owner of the Oland Brewery.
- Philip Oland - son of George Bauld Oland, and nephew of Sidney Oland, served as the CEO of Moosehead Breweries.
- Victor de Bedia Oland - son of Sidney Oland, served as the 24th Lieutenant Governor of Nova Scotia.
- Richard Oland - son of Philip Oland, Vice President of Moosehead Brewery.

== Family tree ==
- John James Dunn Oland (1819–1870) and Susannah Oland (1818 – 1885)
  - Susannah Elizabeth Oland (1843–1918)
  - Ethelred Henry Oland (1847–1930)
  - John Culverwell Oland (1849–1937)
    - John Culverwell Oland Jr (1878–1904)
    - Henry Dwight Ruggles Oland (1884–1972)
  - Conrad George Oland (1851–1917)
  - Huldah Oland (1853–1933)
  - Mary Stephens Oland (1854–1945)
  - George Wodehouse Culverwell Oland (1858–1933)
    - George Bauld Oland (1884–1973)
      - George Alfred Oland (1908–1964)
      - Philip Warburton Oland (1910–1996)
        - Richard Henry Oland (1941–2011)
    - Sidney Culverwell Oland (1886–1977)
      - Victor de Bedia Oland (1913–1983)
      - Bruce Sidney Culverwell Oland (1918–2009)
    - Ella Mary Oland (1891–1980)
    - John Eric Wodehouse Oland DSC (1893–1948)
    - Richard Hibbert Oland OBE (1897–1941)
    - Margaret Eileen Oland (1899–1979)
    - Geoffrey Charles Wodehouse Oland (1903–1958)

== Sources ==
- Bender, Annie (22 October 2015). "Women beer-makers throughout history celebrated at Waterloo Region Museum". Ottawa, Ontario, Canada: Canadian Broadcasting Corporation. Archived from the original on 2 October 2016.
- "Canada Deaths and Burials, 1664-1955: John James Dun Oland". Halifax, Nova Scotia, Canada: Dartmouth Cemetery. 20 October 1870. GS Film #1298880, Reference ID #cn-852.
- Guildford, Janet (1997). ""Whatever the duty of the hour demands": The Work of Middle-Class Women in Halifax, 1840-1880". Histoire Sociale Social History. 30 (59). Ottawa, Ontario, Canada: University of Ottawa. ISSN 0018-2257. Archived from the original on 16 November 2016.
- Joseph, Andrew (April 2014). "Upwardly Mobile". Canadian Packaging. 67 (4). North York, Ontario, Canada: Big Magazines LP: 14–19. Archived from the original on 11 November 2014.
- Ray, Randy; Kearney, Mark (2002). I Know That Name!: The People Behind Canada's Best Known Brand Names from Elizabeth Arden to Walter Zeller. Toronto, Ontario, Canada: Dundurn Press. ISBN 978-1-77070-126-7.
- Sneath, Allen Winn (2001). Brewed in Canada: The Untold Story of Canada's 350-Year-Old Brewing Industry. Toronto, Canada: Dundurn Group. ISBN 9781550023732.
