= Øland =

Øland is a Danish surname. Notable people with the surname include:

- Anders Øland, member of the Danish musical duo Barcode Brothers
- Anne Øland (1949–2015), Danish concert pianist and educator

== See also ==
- Öland
- Oland (disambiguation)
