= John Polanyi =

German-born Canadian chemist

The Honourable John Polanyi PC CC FRSC OOnt FRS
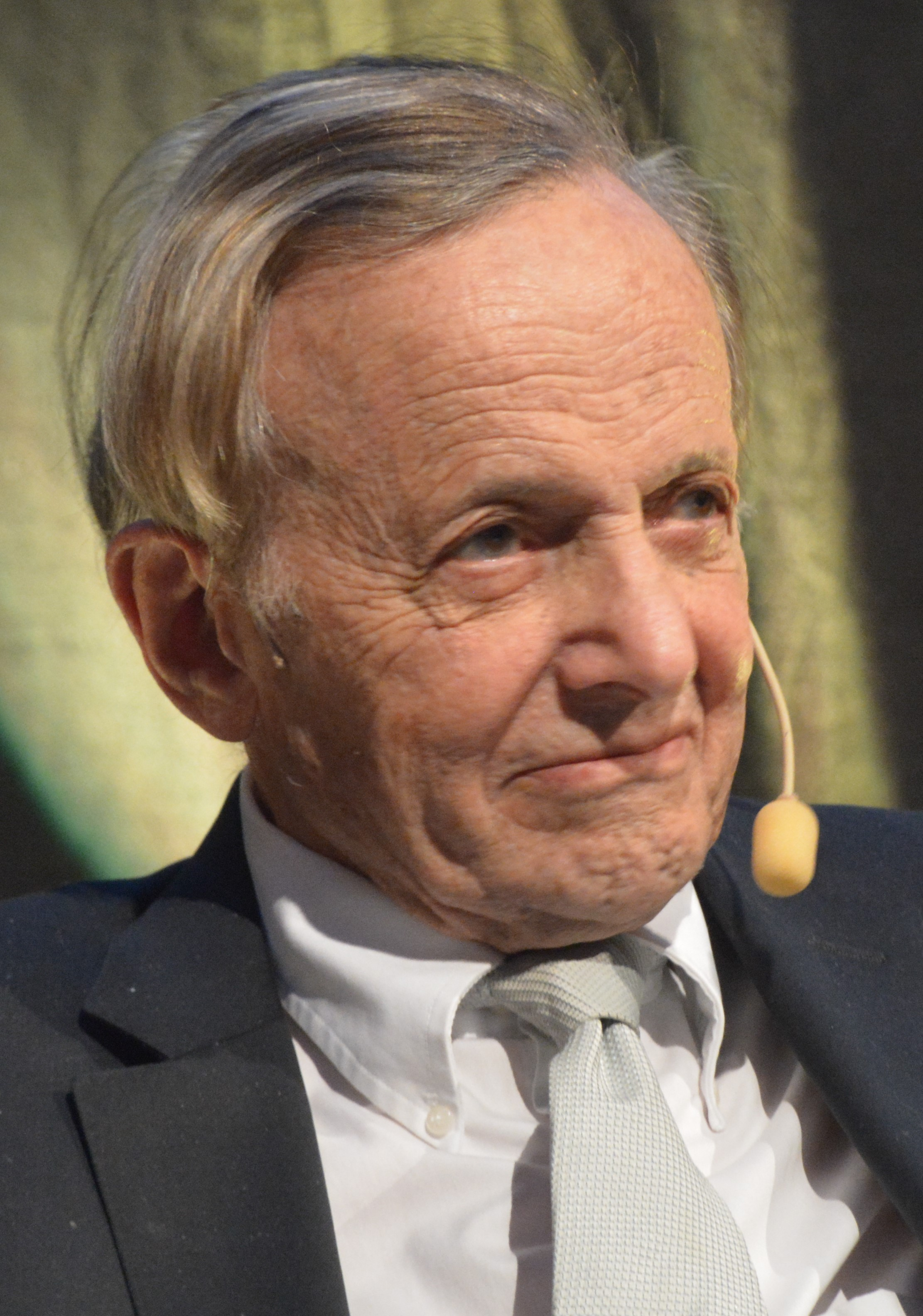
- Polanyi in 2019
- Born: John Charles Polanyi; 23 January 1929 (age 97); Berlin, Germany
- Education: University of Manchester
- Known for: Chemical kinetics Reaction dynamics
- Spouse: Anne Davidson (m. 1958; died 2013)
- Children: 2
- Father: Michael Polanyi
- Relatives: Karl Polanyi (uncle); Ilona Duczynska (aunt); Kari Polanyi Levitt (cousin); Eva Zeisel (cousin)
- Awards: FRS (1971); Henry Marshall Tory Medal (1977); Wolf Prize in Chemistry (1982); Nobel Prize in Chemistry (1986); Royal Medal (1989); Faraday Lectureship Prize (2010)
- Scientific career
- Workplaces: University of Toronto
- Website: www.chemistry.utoronto.ca/people/directories/all-faculty/john-polanyi

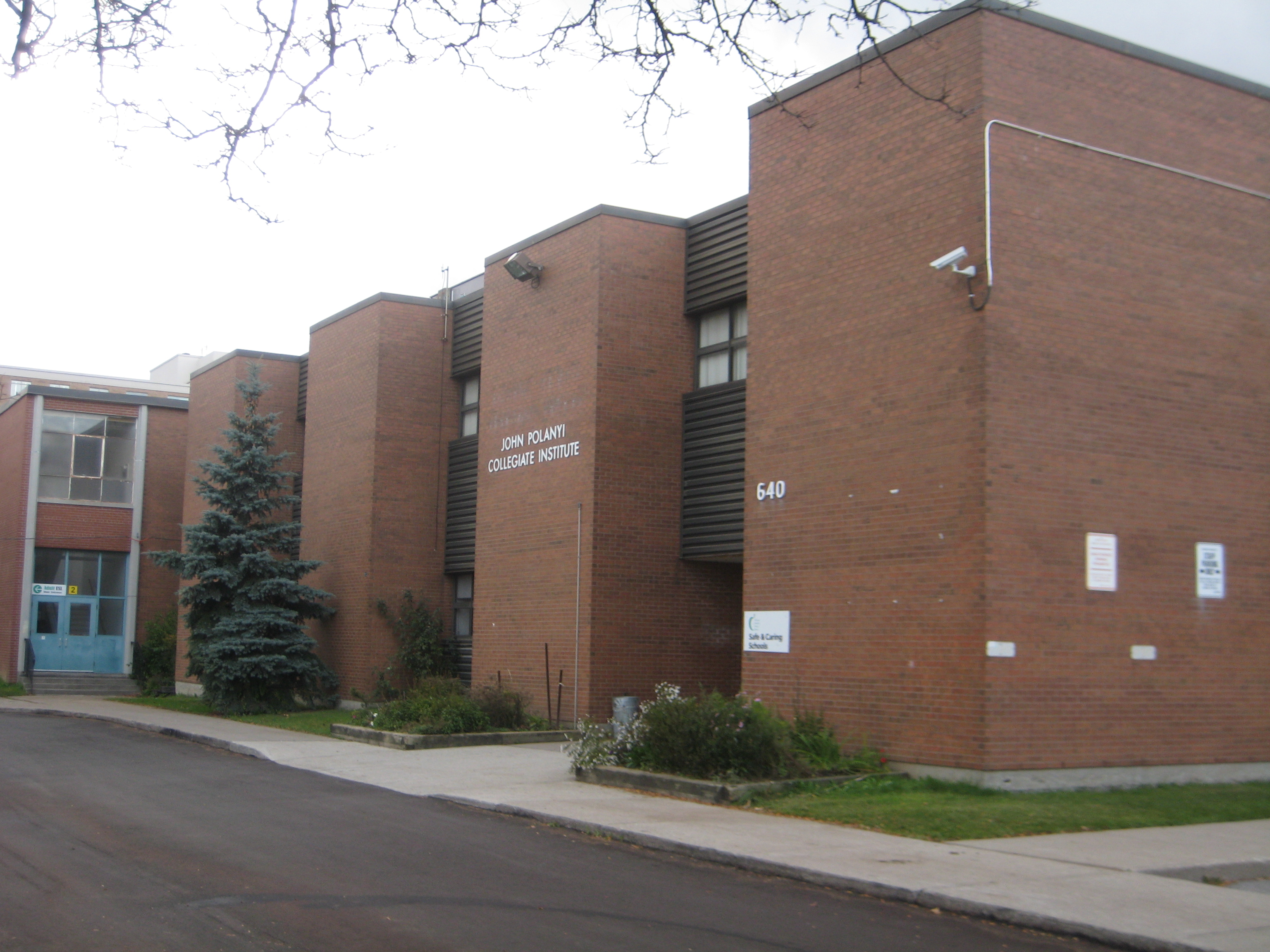
John Polanyi Collegiate Institute, Toronto

John Charles Polanyi (Hungarian: Polányi János Károly; born 23 January 1929) is a German-born Hungarian-Canadian chemist. He was awarded the 1986 Nobel Prize in Chemistry for his research in chemical reaction dynamics.

Polanyi was born into the prominent Hungarian Polányi (Pollacsek) family in Berlin, Germany, prior to his family emigrating in 1933 to the United Kingdom where he was subsequently educated at the University of Manchester, achieving his Ph.D in 1952, and did postdoctoral research at the National Research Council in Canada (1952-1954) and Princeton University in New Jersey (1954-1956). Polanyi's first academic appointment was at the University of Toronto in 1956, and he remains there as of 2025 as University Professor Emeritus.

In addition to the Nobel Prize, Polanyi has received numerous other awards, including 33 honorary degrees, the Wolf Prize in Chemistry and the Gerhard Herzberg Canada Gold Medal for Science and Engineering. Outside his scientific pursuits, Polanyi is active in public policy discussion, especially concerning science and nuclear weapons. According to György Marx, he was one of "The Martians", a group of prominent Hungarian scientists who emigrated to the United States in the first half of the 20th century.

== Early years ==
His father, Mihály (Michael), was a chemist, philosopher of science, and economist; his uncle Károly (Karl) was an economic historian. Michael was born Jewish and converted to Catholicism. He moved from Germany to Britain in 1933, partly as a result of the persecution of Jews under Adolf Hitler. During World War II, Polanyi's father sent him to Canada for three years when he was 11, so he would be safe from German bombings. While living in Toronto, he attended the University of Toronto Schools. After returning to Britain, Polanyi finished high school and attended university at Manchester, where he received his undergraduate degree in 1949 and his PhD in 1952. Although his university education was focused in science, he was not convinced it was his calling after finishing high school, when he briefly considered a career as a poet. His father, Michael Polanyi, was a professor in the chemistry department during his first year of university, before transferring to a newly created position in the social studies department. Polanyi's supervisor during his graduate studies was Ernest Warhurst, a former student of his father's. After completing his PhD studies, Polanyi did postdoctoral research at the National Research Council in Ottawa, Ontario from 1952 until 1954, where he worked with Edgar William Richard Steacie. From 1954 until 1956, he was a research associate at Princeton University.

== Academic posts ==
John Polanyi started at the University of Toronto as a lecturer in 1956. He moved up the ranks quickly at the university, being promoted to assistant professor in 1957, associate professor in 1960 and becoming a full professor in 1962. In 1974, he was named University Professor, an honorary title he has retained since.

== Research interests ==
Polanyi's PhD studies at Manchester University focused on measuring the strengths of chemical bonds using thermal dissociation, building on Warhurst's graduate studies using a sodium flame apparatus to determine the likelihood that a collision between a sodium atom and another molecule would lead to a chemical reaction. For the majority of his career, Polanyi's research has focused on chemical dynamics, attempting to determine the mechanics of a chemical reaction, and the properties of chemical species in the transition state. While at the National Research Council (NRC), Polanyi evaluated transition state theory for its predictive powers, coming to the conclusion that the theory was flawed, largely due to a lack of knowledge about the forces at play in the transition state. Near the end of his stay at NRC, Polanyi worked in Gerhard Herzberg's lab, using spectroscopy to examine vibrational and rotational excitation in iodine molecules. During Polanyi's time at Princeton University, he worked with Sir Hugh Taylor and his colleagues, Michael Boudart and David Garvin. He was influenced by studies conducted at Princeton looking at the vibrationally excited reaction products between atomic hydrogen and ozone.

When Polanyi moved to the University of Toronto, his first graduate students were looking for enhanced reaction rates with vibrationally excited hydrogen, as well as looking for the presence of vibrationally excited hydrogen chloride during the exothermic reaction of molecular chlorine with atomic hydrogen. Graduate student Kenneth Cashion was working with Polanyi when they made their first discoveries about chemiluminescence, the light emitted by an atom molecule when it is in an excited state. This work was first published in 1958.

In 2009, Polanyi and his colleagues published a paper in Nature Chemistry, entitled "Cooperative molecular dynamics in surface reactions." This more recent research could be influential in nanotechnology, building devices from single atoms and molecules. Polanyi's work still focuses on the basic workings of chemical reactions, but since his Nobel Prize win in 1986, his methods have changed. While in Sweden for the award ceremony, he encountered the three scientists who were awarded the 1986 Nobel Prize in Physics, who were honoured for their work in electron optics and scanning tunneling microscopy. This technology allowed Polanyi and his colleagues to monitor chemical reactions on a very small scale, rather than observing the energy being released using infrared technology. His lab at the University of Toronto currently has 4 scanning tunneling microscopes, valued at approximately $750,000 each.

In addition to his scientific pursuits, Polanyi has also always been keenly aware of the world at large. As a student, he edited a newspaper and displayed an interest in politics. Although his father was a scientist, he did not demonstrate an immediate affinity for chemistry. Beginning in the 1950s, Polanyi became involved in public affairs, especially concerning nuclear weapons. He founded Canada's Pugwash group in 1960, and served as the chairman for the group from its inception until 1978. Pugwash is a global movement that received the Nobel Peace Prize in 1995. Their goal is to reduce armed conflict and seek solutions to global problems. He has also been a supporter of "pure" science, and a critic of government policies that do not support such research. He is also a supporter of the Campaign for the Establishment of a United Nations Parliamentary Assembly, an organisation which campaigns for democratic reformation of the United Nations, and the creation of a more accountable international political system. Polanyi often accepts speaking engagements to discuss issues relating to social justice, peace and nuclear proliferation, despite his busy research schedule. He frequently comments on science and public policy issues via the Letters to the Editor and Opinion sections of The Globe and Mail newspaper. He currently serves on the National Advisory Board of the Center for Arms Control and Non-Proliferation, the research arm of Council for a Livable World.

== Awards and honours ==
=== Nobel Prize ===
Polanyi was awarded the 1986 Nobel Prize in Chemistry for his work in chemical reaction dynamics. He shared the prize with Dudley Herschbach of Harvard University and Yuan T. Lee of the University of California, Berkeley. The trio were honoured for "their contributions concerning the dynamics of chemical elementary processes." Polanyi's contributions were centred around the work he did developing the technique of infrared chemiluminescence. This technique was used to measure weak infrared emissions from a newly formed molecule in order to examine energy disposal during a chemical reaction. Polanyi's Nobel lecture upon receipt of the award was entitled "Some Concepts in Reaction Dynamics."

Polanyi had mixed feelings about the impact of the Nobel Prize on his research, feeling that his name on research proposals and papers often brought additional scrutiny, and also had people questioning his dedication to science after the honour. Polanyi said, "There is a very reasonable suspicion that you are so busy doing the things that Nobel Prize winners do that you are actually only giving half your mind to science."

His Nobel victory also signaled a change in his research direction. The 1986 Nobel Prize in Physics was awarded to Ernst Ruska, Gerd Binnig and Heinrich Rohrer for their work in electron microscopes and scanning tunnelling microscopy (STM). This research piqued Polanyi's interest while he was in Sweden for the ceremony. After returning to Toronto, Polanyi and his colleagues looked into the technique and now have four STMs, which they use to picture chemical reactions at the molecular level, rather than using infrared detection and chemiluminescence.

Polanyi's Nobel medal is on display at Massey College (University of Toronto) where he is also a Senior Fellow.

=== Additional awards ===
Polanyi was elected a Fellow of the Royal Society (FRS) in 1971. In 1974, Polanyi was made an Officer of the Order of Canada. In 1979, he was promoted to Companion. He has received many other awards throughout his career, including the Marlow Medal of the Faraday Society in 1962, Centenary Medal of the British Chemical Society in 1965, the Steacie Prize for Natural Sciences in 1965 (shared), the Noranda Award of the Chemical Institute of Canada in 1967, the Henry Marshall Tory Medal of the Royal Society of Canada in 1977, the Wolf Prize in Chemistry in 1982 (shared), the Izaak Walton Killam Memorial Prize in 1988, the Royal Medal of the Royal Society in 1989, and the John C. Polanyi Lecture Award of the Canadian Society for Chemistry in 1992. In 2007, Polanyi was awarded the Gerhard Herzberg Canada Gold Medal for Science and Engineering. The Royal Society of Chemistry honoured Polanyi as their 2010 Faraday Lectureship Prize.

Polanyi has received many honorary degrees from over 30 institutions, including Waterloo in 1970, Harvard University in 1982, Ottawa in 1987, and Queen's in 1992. He is a fellow of the Royal Society of Canada, the Royal Society of London, the Royal Society of Edinburgh, and a member of the American Academy of Arts and Sciences, the U.S. National Academy of Sciences, the Pontifical Academy of Sciences, and an Honorary Fellow of the Royal Society of Chemistry of the United Kingdom and the Chemical Institute of Canada.

Polanyi was pictured on a Canada Post first class postage stamp on 3 October 2011, issued to salute the International Year of Chemistry. In 1992, Polanyi was appointed to the Queen's Privy Council of Canada.

Polanyi was awarded the 2022 Andrei Sakharov Prize. The award cites Polanyi's seven decades of activism for a nuclear-weapons-free world, for upholding human rights and freedom of speech globally, for public education on the essential role of science in society, and for a visionary approach to bringing about a hopeful, peaceful future.

=== Legacy ===
In honour of Polanyi's Nobel Prize win, the Ontario government established the "John Charles Polanyi Prizes". These prizes are each worth $20,000, and are awarded to young researchers in the province in a postdoctoral fellowship or who have recently started a faculty appointment at an Ontario university. The prizes are awarded in similar categories to the Nobel Prizes, broadly defined as: Physics, Chemistry, Physiology or Medicine, Economics and Literature.

Canada's Natural Sciences and Engineering Research Council (NSERC) created the John C. Polanyi award to recognize a researcher or researchers whose work in an NSERC-supported field has led to an outstanding advance in the field. The research must have been conducted in Canada, and have been at least partially supported by NSERC funding. The award consists partially of a $250,000 grant for the winner. The inaugural winner of the John C. Polanyi Award was the Sudbury Neutrino Observatory. In 2011, the award was presented to Victoria M. Kaspi, an astrophysicist at McGill University.

Polanyi started publishing his scientific research in 1953. As of 2010, he has published over 250 scientific papers. His writing is not limited to his scientific interests, as he has published over 100 articles on policy, the impact of science on society and armament control. In 1970, he produced a film entitled Concepts in Reaction Dynamics, and he co-edited a book called The Dangers of Nuclear War.

In 2010, the Toronto District School Board voted to change the name of Sir Sandford Fleming Academy to the John Polanyi Collegiate Institute to coincide with a move to a new location. The new school opened in September 2011.

== Personal life ==
Polanyi was born in 1929 to Michael and Magda Elizabeth Kemény Polanyi in Berlin, Germany. His father was born in 1891, in Hungary. His uncle Karl was an economist, noted for his criticism of market capitalism. His brother George was noted for his defence of market capitalism. His paternal grandfather, Mihaly Pollacsek, built railways. Mihaly Pollacsek Magyarised the family's name to Polanyi, but did not change his own name. The Polanyi's were non-observant Jews, although Michael Polanyi became a Christian.

In 1958, Polanyi married Anne Ferrar Davidson (1929–2013). He has two children – a daughter, Margaret, born in 1961 and a son, Michael, born in 1963. His daughter is a journalist, and his son is a political scientist who started his career as a physicist. Polanyi is currently married to portrait artist Brenda Bury. Outside his scientific and policy endeavours, Polanyi's interests include art, literature and poetry. He was an avid white water canoeist in his younger days, but has replaced that with walking and skiing.

== See also ==
- Chemical laser
- The Martians (scientists)
- List of Jewish Nobel laureates
