= John Sawyer =

John Sawyer may refer to:

- John G. Sawyer (1825–1898), U.S. Representative from New York
- John Edward Sawyer (1917–1995), academic and philanthropic administrator
- John Sawyer (writer) (1919–1994), British gothic and romance writer
- John Sawyer (American football) (born 1953), American football tight end in the National Football League
- John Sawyer (meteorologist) (1916–2000), British meteorologist
- John Sawyer (MP), British Member of Parliament for Leominster
