= Henry Poole MacKeen =

Canadian politician

The Honourable Henry Poole MacKeen SM CD QC

23rd Lieutenant Governor of Nova Scotia
- In office 1 March 1963 – 22 July 1968
- Monarch: Elizabeth II
- Governors General: Georges Vanier; Roland Michener
- Premier: Robert Stanfield; G.I. Smith
- Preceded by: Edward Chester Plow
- Succeeded by: Victor de Bedia Oland

Personal details
- Born: June 17, 1892 Glace Bay, Nova Scotia
- Died: April 20, 1971 (aged 78) Halifax, Nova Scotia
- Spouse: Alice Richardson Tilley (m. 1928)
- Relations: David MacKeen (father)
- Children: Judith Tilley MacKeen and Henry David MacKeen
- Education: Dalhousie University (LLB)
- Occupation: Lawyer
- Profession: Soldier

Henry Poole MacKeen SM CD QC (June 17, 1892 – April 20, 1971) was a Canadian lawyer and the 23rd Lieutenant Governor of Nova Scotia from 1963 to 1968.

Born in Glace Bay, Nova Scotia, the son of former Lieutenant Governor of Nova Scotia David MacKeen, he served during World War I as an artillery officer, reaching the rank of Lieutenant-Colonel and was wounded in 1916. After the war, he received his LL.B in 1921 from Dalhousie University. He was a practicing lawyer and served during World War II as the commanding officer of the Halifax Rifles 2nd Battalion from 1945 to 1946. He was also the Honorary Lieutenant Colonel from 1948 to 1960. He helped to defend Kurt Meyer, Canada's only jailed war criminal. In 1933 he was appointed a King's Council by the Lieutenant Governor of Nova Scotia.

He was appointed lieutenant governor in 1963 and served until 1968. After, he became the first chancellor of Acadia University.

In 1969, he was awarded the Medal of Service of the Order of Canada. The Medal of Service of the Order was converted to the Officer level of the Order of Canada in 1972, however as MacKeen died in 1971 his Medal of Service was never converted to an OC. MacKeen's papers are held by the Nova Scotia Archives.

A portrait of MacKeen by Brenda Bury hangs at Government House Halifax. Another portrait of MacKeen hangs in the Halifax office of law firm Stewart McKelvey which is the successor firm to Stewart MacKeen & Covert where MacKeen practised law.

In 1928, he married Alice Richardson Tilley, the daughter of Leonard Percy de Wolfe Tilley. They had two children: Judith Tilley MacKeen and Henry David MacKeen.
