= Mark Lautens =

Canadian organic chemist

Mark Lautens O.C. FRSC
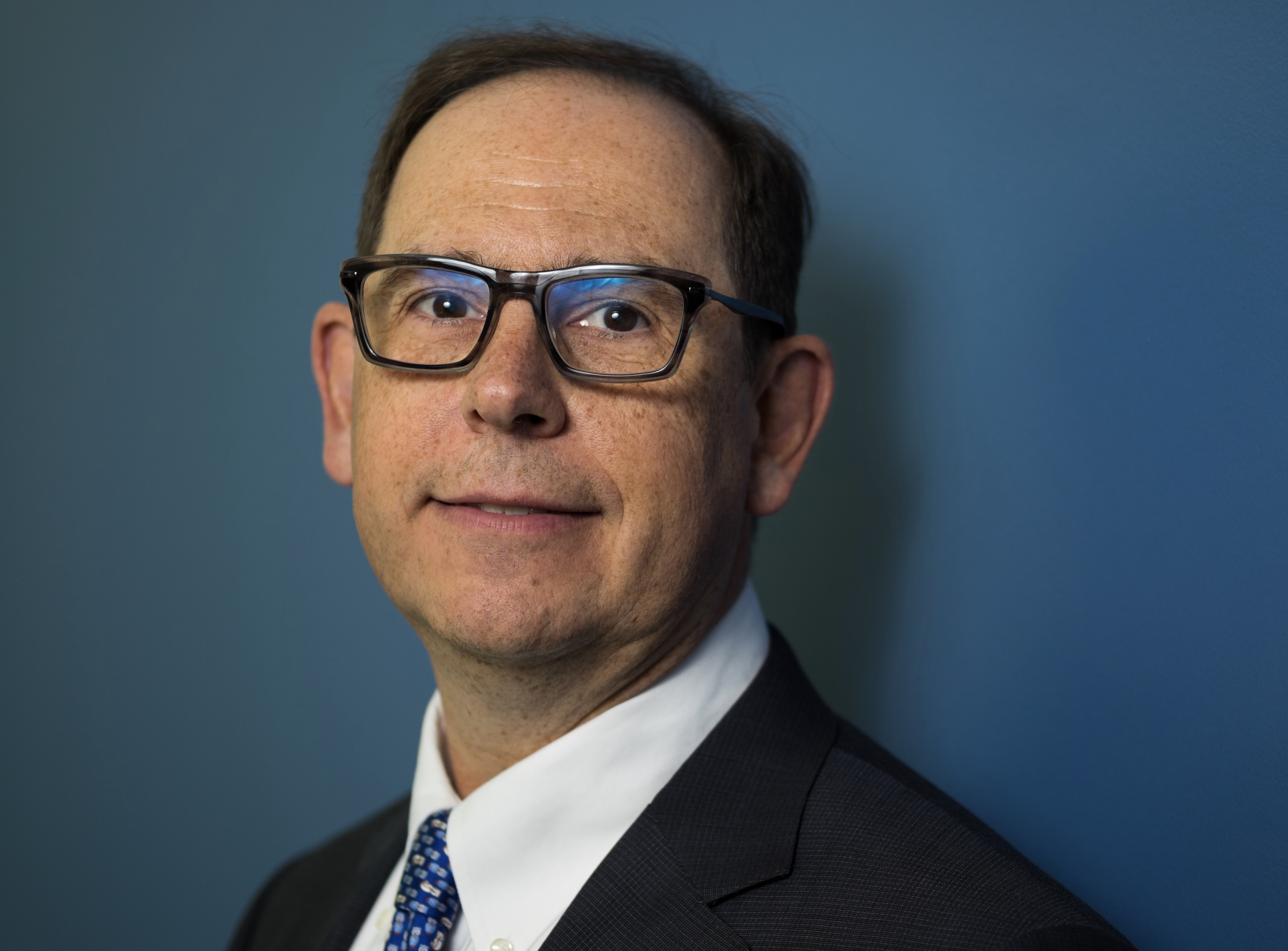
- Lautens in 2018
- Born: July 9, 1959 (age 67); Hamilton, Ontario, Canada
- Education: University of Guelph, University of Wisconsin–Madison
- Occupations: Organic chemist, professor
- Years active: 1987 - present

Mark Lautens (born July 9, 1959) is a Canadian organic chemist who is a professor at the University of Toronto and chair of the Chemistry Department. He is known for his involvement in the developments of asymmetric ring-opening chemistry, synthetic utility and scope of the Catellani Reaction including the use of ligands to facilitate the reaction, carbohalogenation, multi-component multi-catalyst reactions, and domino catalysis.

== Education and career ==
Born in Hamilton, Ontario, Lautens received a Bachelor of Science degree from the University of Guelph in 1981. He then moved to the University of Wisconsin–Madison for his Ph.D. (1981-1985) working with Barry M. Trost with an NSERC Postgraduate Scholarship. Following graduation, he was an NSERC PDF at Harvard University (1985-1987) in the laboratories of David A. Evans. In 1987 he was appointed as an NSERC Undergraduate Research Fellowship assistant professor at the University of Toronto and was promoted to professor in 1995. Since 2012, he has held the rank of University Professor, awarded to up to 2% of the faculty at the University of Toronto. As of 2023, he took on the role of Chair of the Chemistry Department for a 5-year term.

== Science advocacy ==
Lautens has made an effort to improve government support for funding science in Canada, and for young researchers in particular, by contributing op-ed pieces to various newspapers including The Toronto Star, The Globe and Mail and The Hill Times. He has also described his personal experiences while presiding at citizenship ceremonies and has also questioned why there are not more scientists running for office. As of 2023, he has presided over 100 citizenship ceremonies.

During the COVID-19 pandemic of 2020, Lautens published a piece describing how research funding to science and medicine are crucial for a successful response and supports paying students and post-docs a better wage. He mentions how we have learned a lot about the importance of science, but even more about how science needs to be deployed broadly and with full force if we hope to tackle the most challenging societal problems. He further described how the current situation is shedding light on the "messy and sometimes infuriating process of scientific discovery". He has encouraged compassion and empathy in the time of the pandemic.

== Honours and awards ==
Lautens was made a fellow of the Royal Society of Canada in 2001. He is currently the AstraZeneca Professor of Organic Chemistry (1998–present) and was an NSERC/Merck Frosst Industrial Research Chair (2003–2013). In 2009, he was an Alexander von Humboldt awardee. In 2013, he was awarded the Chemical Institute of Canada's CIC Medal. In 2014, he was made an Officer of the Order of Canada "for his contributions at the forefront of organic chemistry, which have led to the creation of new medicinal compounds with fewer side effects". He was awarded an honorary degree, Doctor of Science, honoris causa, from the University of Guelph in 2016. In 2017, he was awarded the Henry Marshall Tory Medal from the Royal Society of Canada.

In addition to his awards for his research, he received the J.J. Berry Smith Doctoral Supervision Award in 2017, which recognizes outstanding performance in the multiple roles associated with doctoral supervision. In 2020, he won the E.W.R. Steacie Award for making a distinguished contribution to chemistry while working in Canada, being the second chemistry professor at the University of Toronto to do so. Recently, the American Chemical Society announced that Lautens won the 2021 Herbert C. Brown Award for Creative Research in Synthetic Methods for his outstanding creative research that involved the discovery and development of novel and useful methods for chemical synthesis. Most recently, he is the recipient of the University of Toronto's 2021 Chair's Teaching Award. Lautens received the E.C. Taylor Senior Award in 2024 from the International Society of Heterocyclic Chemistry as recognition for outstanding contributions to the field. He is the second Canadian chemist to receive this award.

== Other awards ==
- Royal Society of Chemistry Pedler Award (2011)
- Killam Research Fellowship (2013–2015)
- Officer of the Order of Canada (2014)6)
- J.J. Berry Smith Doctoral Supervision Award (2017)
- Senior Fellow of Massey College
- E.W.R. Steacie Award (2020)
- Herbert C. Brown Award for Creative Research in Synthetic Methods (2021)
- Chair's Teaching Award (2021)
- E.C Taylor Award (2024)
