= List of fellows of the Royal Society elected in 1962 =

Fellows of the Royal Society elected in 1962.

== Fellows ==
- Sir Michael Francis Atiyah
- Moses Blackman
- Hermann Karl Felix Blaschko
- William Cochran
- Sir William Richard Joseph Cook
- William Alexander Deer
- Charles Enrique Dent
- Robert William Ditchburn
- Philip Herries Gregory
- Maurice Neville Hill
- Douglas William Holder
- Sir Stanley George Hooker
- Alfred Alexander Peter Kleczkowski
- Stanley Mandelstam
- Leslie Eleazer Orgel
- Francis Rex Parrington
- Howard Latimer Penman
- Martin Rivers Pollock
- Ralph Alexander Raphael
- John Stanley Sawyer
- William George Schneider
- Robert Allan Smith
- Michael Meredith Swann, Baron Swann of Coln St Denys
- Nikolaas Tinbergen
- Harry Lambert Welsh

== Foreign members ==
- Daniel Bovet
- Fritz Albert Lipmann
- J. Robert Oppenheimer
- Vladimir Prelog

== Statute 12 fellow ==
- Maurice Harold Macmillan
