= Jan Zaanen =

Dutch physicist (1957–2024)

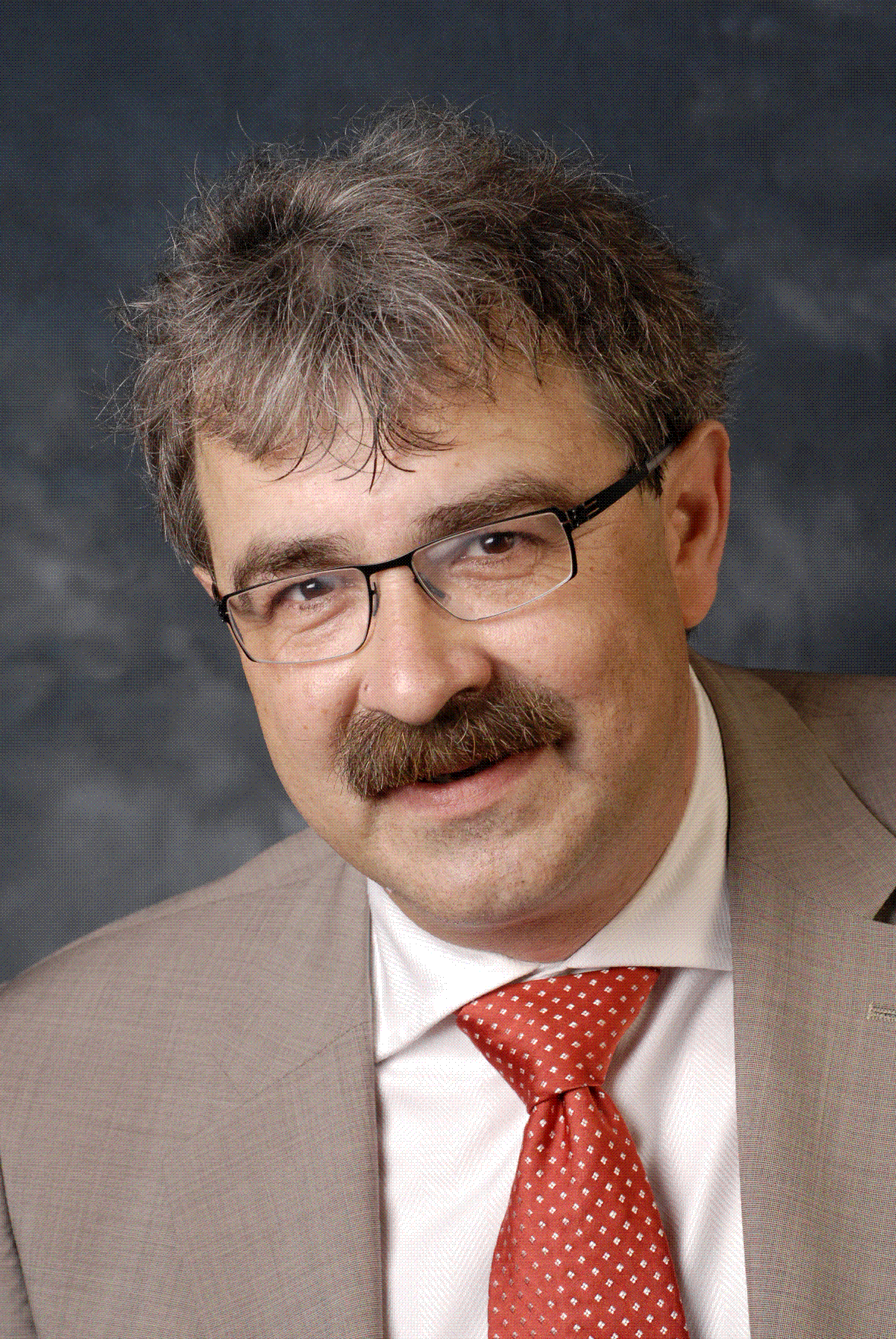
- Born: 17 April 1957; Leiden, Netherlands
- Died: 18 January 2024 (aged 66)
- Education: University of Groningen
- Known for: Zaanen-Sawatzky-Allen diagram LDA+U
- Awards: Spinoza Prize; Fellow of the KNAW
- Scientific career
- Fields: Theoretical physics
- Workplaces: Leiden University
- Website: Personal homepage

Jan Zaanen (17 April 1957 – 18 January 2024) was a Dutch professor of theoretical physics at Leiden University. He is best known for his contributions to the understanding of the quantum physics of the electrons in strongly correlated material, and in particular high temperature superconductivity. Zaanen's areas of interest were in the search for novel forms of collective quantum phenomena realized in systems built from mundane constituents like electrons, spins, and atoms.

Zaanen introduced the so-called Zaanen-Sawatzky-Allen diagram, the LDA+U band structure method and he became particularly well known for his discovery of the stripe instability of the doped Mott insulator. His later research was focused on the quantum critical point and unconventional phases of quantum matter. He was a well-known proponent of the application of the holographic principle to condensed matter physics. He was also well known for his many editorial contributions to the journals Nature and Science. He was on the board of reviewing editors of the latter journal and also editor of the Journal of High Energy Physics.

== Career ==
Jan Zaanen was born on 17 April 1957 in Leiden. While studying chemistry at the University of Groningen he played violin in folk band and bass guitar in a band with Herman Finkers. When he realized he would not become a great guitarist he stopped with music. He received his degree in chemistry with honours at Groningen in 1982, where he also received his doctorate four years later, again with honours. He was under supervision with Spinoza Prize winner George Sawatzky. After a postdoctoral fellowship at the Max Planck Institute for Solid State Research in Stuttgart, he worked for some years as a researcher at AT&T Bell Laboratories in the USA. In 1993 Zaanen returned to the Netherlands, where he worked at Leiden University as a Royal Netherlands Academy of Arts and Sciences (KNAW) fellow. He has been a professor at Leiden since 2000. Furthermore, in 2004 he was appointed a visiting professor for one year at Stanford University.

In 2004-2005 he spent a year at Stanford University sponsored by the Fulbright Program and in 2006 he received the Spinoza Prize, the "Dutch Nobel prize", for his scientific accomplishments. Zaanen was one of the driving forces behind the scientific cooperation between the fields of string theory and high-temperature superconductivity. In an interview with Dutch newspaper, De Volkskrant, he stated:

After winning the Spinoza Prize, it was no longer necessary to worry whether I was proving myself enough. You start looking at things you really like. Furthermore I wanted to prove that I was not too old to learn new things. String theory really is another ballgame than the rest of physics] and I'm proud that I was able to learn it.

Zaanen was a visiting professor of Theoretical Physics at the Ecole Normale Superieur, Paris, France. In 2012 and 2013 he respectively was a Solvay Professor of Physics at the Solvay Institute, Brussels, Belgium and a fellow of the Newton Centre at the University of Cambridge. He was Professor of theoretical physics at Leiden University.

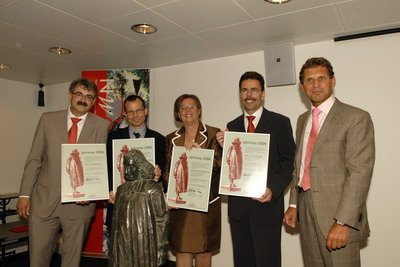
Spinoza Prize winners 2006, Jan Zaanen, Ben Scheres, Jozien Bensing and Carl Figdor. To the right is NWO-director Peter Nijkamp

From 2012 Zaanen was member of the Royal Netherlands Academy of Arts and Sciences.

Zaanen was diagnosed in with esophageal cancer in late summer 2022. He died from cancer on 18 January 2024, at the age of 66.

== High-temperature superconductivity ==
Zaanen is known for his contribution to the understanding of high-temperature superconductivity. In most high-temperature superconductors the copper atoms are arranged in thin layers. Each atom has its own magnetic field which is opposite to that of its neighbor. Electrons can scarcely move in such an environment, as they are also magnetic. Zaanen and colleagues Cubrovic and Schalm applied string theory to explain a physical phenomenon. Initially their use of string theory attracted a lot of criticism. However, in recent years an increasing amount of experimental evidence has been collected in its favor. Its latest accomplishment is the development of the AdS/CFT correspondence theory, sometimes called Maldacena duality or gauge/gravity duality.

Once it was realised that AdS/CFT could be applied to a broader spectrum of physical phenomena, Zaanen was inspired to use these ideas for his own area of High-temperature superconductivity. Zaanen stated:

"It has always been assumed that once you understand this quantum-critical state, you can also understand high temperature super-conductivity. But, although the experiments produced a lot of information, we hadn't the faintest idea of how to describe this phenomenon. We hadn't expected it to work so well, the maths was a perfect fit; it was superb. When we saw the calculations, at first we could hardly believe it, but it was right."

== Other areas of involvement ==
- General relativity and string theory
- Fermion minus sign problem
- Stripe microscopy and Stripe fractionalisation
- Geometrical order in Luttinger liquids
- Duality in quantum elasticity: quantum liquid crystals and cosmology
- Quantum criticality

== Later publications ==
- A. Mesaros, K. Fujita, H. Eisaki, J.C. Davis, S. Sachdev, J. Zaanen, E.-A. Kim and M. Lawler, How topological defects couple the smectic and nematic electronic structure of the cuprate pseudogap states, Science, 426 (2011).
- R.J. Slager, A. Mesaros, V. Juricic and J. Zaanen, The space group classification of topological band-insulators, Nature Physics, 98 (2013).
- Y. Liu, K. Schalm, Y.-W. Sun and J. Zaanen, Lattice potentials in holographic non Fermi-liquids: hybridizing local quantum criticality, Journal of High Energy Physics, 036 (2012).
- J. Zaanen, Holographic duality: stealing dimensions from metals, Nature Physics 9, 609 (2013)
- L. Rademaker, Y. Pramudya, J. Zaanen and V. Dobrosavljevic, Influence of long-range interactions on charge ordering phenomena on a square lattice, Physical Review E 88, 032121 (2013)
- L. Rademaker, J. van den Brink, H. Hilgenkamp and J. Zaanen, Enhancement of spin propagation due to interlayer exciton condensation, Physical Review B 88, 121101(R) (2013)
- A.J. Beekman, K. Wu, V. Cvetkovic and J. Zaanen, Deconfining the rotational Goldstone mode: the superconducting quantum liquid crystal in 2+1 dimensions, Physical Review B 88, 024121(2013)
