= Manuella Vincter =

Canadian physicist

- Awards: Fellow of the Canadian Association of Physicists (2026), Breakthrough Prize in Fundamental Physics awarded to ATLAS Collaboration and shared with the ALICE, ATLAS, CMS, and LHCb Collaborations (2025), Royal Society of Canada Henry Marshall Tory Medal (2021), Royal Society of Canada Fellow (2018), Canada Council for the Arts Killam Research Fellowship (2014-16), Canada Research Chair (2004-2014), Alexander von Humboldt Foundation Fellow (2001)

Academic background
- Education: University of Victoria

Academic work
- Discipline: Experimental particle physics
- Institutions: University of Alberta; Carleton University

Manuella Vincter is a professor in the Department of Physics at Carleton University. She is a Fellow of the Royal Society of Canada and was the deputy spokesperson for the ATLAS experiment.

== Career ==
Vincter earned her B.Sc. in 1990 from McGill University, her M.Sc. in 1993 and her PhD in 1996, both at the University of Victoria. Her PhD thesis was on the precision measurement of the ratio of vector to axial-vector coupling of the weak force, which she conducted at the LEP collider at CERN as a member of the OPAL Experiment. She then joined the faculty at the University of Alberta, where she worked on the HERMES experiment at the DESY laboratory and also joined the ATLAS collaboration. She then joined Carleton University as a Canada Research Chair in Experimental Particle Physics, and was appointed Deputy Spokesperson for the ATLAS-Canada team. She was elected to the Royal Society of Canada in 2018, and in 2019 she was appointed Deputy Spokesperson for the ATLAS experiment until 2025. She is a recipient of the 2021 Henry Marshall Tory Medal (awarded by the Royal Society of Canada for outstanding research in any branch of astronomy, chemistry, mathematics, physics, or an allied science). In 2026, she was made Fellow of the Canadian Association of Physicists (FCAP).

== Research area ==
Vincter's research is in experimental particle physics. Her collaborative endeavours delve into phenomena involving the electroweak and strong fundamental forces of nature and in Higgs-boson physics, in particular at the ATLAS experiment. Her expertise is in precision measurements of the electroweak interaction through the decay of W and Z bosons into leptons, such as electrons and muons. She has also performed research at the DESY Laboratory in Hamburg, Germany, a laboratory for deep-inelastic electron-proton collision physics that hosted HERMES, an experiment dedicated to deciphering the spin structure puzzle of the proton where she was its Physics Analysis Coordinator (2000-2001).
