= Alexander Edgar Douglas =

Canadian physicist

Alexander Edgar Douglas, FRSC FRS (12 April 1916, in Melfort, Saskatchewan – 26 July 1981, in Ottawa) was a Canadian physicist, known for his work in molecular spectroscopy. He was president of the Canadian Association of Physicists in 1975–1976.

== Biography ==
Born on a farm in Saskatchewan, Douglas received his BA and MA degrees from the University of Saskatchewan. Gerhard Herzberg was his MA thesis advisor. During World War II, Douglas interrupted his studies to do military-related research in the Physics Division at the NRC. After the war, he earned his PhD in physics at Pennsylvania State University under David H. Rank. In 1949 Douglas became NRC's head of the Spectroscopy Section of the Physics Division, which was directed by Gerhard Herzberg. From 1969 to 1973 Douglas was the director of the Physics Division of the NRC. He returned to his previous job as head of the Spectroscopy Section in 1973 and remained in that position until his retirement from the NRC in 1980.

A. E. Douglas was the first to observe the spectra of B_{2}, Si_{2}, CH^{+}, SiH^{+}, NF, PF, BN, CN^{+} and many other diatomic or triatomic molecules. He first identified the 4050 group of lines observed in comets as being due to the C_{3} molecule. Using a method that he developed, Douglas made the first studies of the Zeeman effect in polyatomic molecules.

According to Gerhard Herzberg:

One of Douglas' most important contributions was his recognition of the reason for "anomalous lifetimes," that is, the failure of a simple relationship between absorption coefficient and lifetime to account for lifetimes in such compounds as NO_{2}, SO_{2}, C_{6}H_{6}. This phenomenon, referred to in the most recent literature as the Douglas effect, is closely connected with internal conversion in larger molecules.

In astrophysical applications of molecular spectroscopy, Douglas is known for his identification of interstellar CH^{+} and of cometary C_{3} and for the reproduction in the laboratory of the Meinel bands of N_{2}^{+} and other spectra.

== Honours and awards ==
- 1956 – Elected Fellow of the Royal Society of Canada
- 1970 – Medal for Achievement in Physics from the Canadian Association of Physicists
- 1979 – Elected Fellow of the Royal Society of London
- 1980 – International meeting on molecular spectroscopy sponsored in June in honour of A. E. Douglas by the NRC
- 1981 – Henry Marshall Tory Medal
