= George Sawatzky =

Canadian physicist

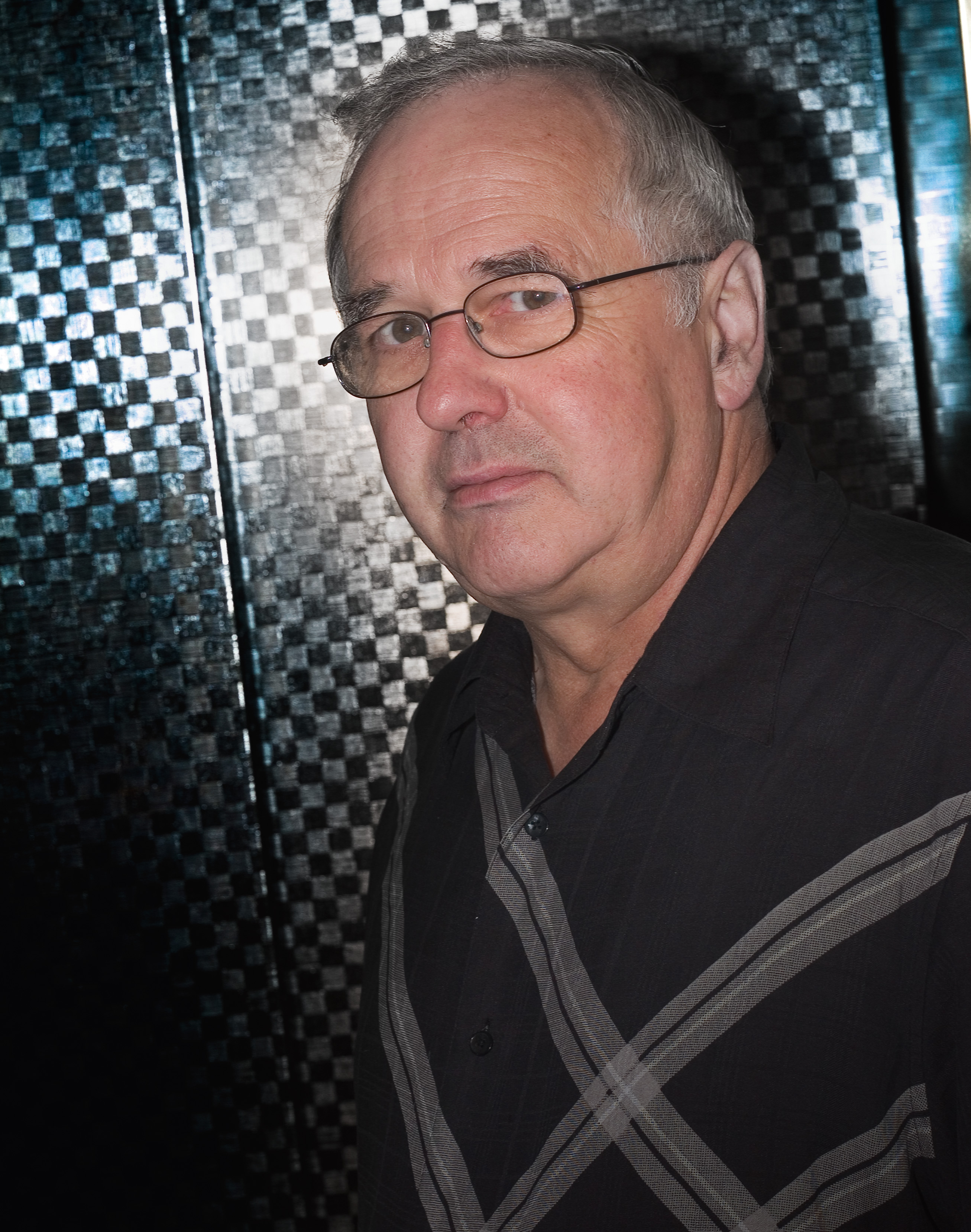
- Education: University of Manitoba
- Occupations: Physicist, university teacher
- Awards: Henry Marshall Tory Medal (2007); Fellow of the Royal Society (2008, 2008)
- Scientific career
- Thesis: Some properties of ferrimagnetic spinels and their determination with the Mössbauer effect (1969)
- Website: phas.ubc.ca/users/george-sawatzky

George Albert Sawatzky FRSC FRS (born 16 May 1942, Winkler, Manitoba, Canada) is a Canadian physicist, known for his research in solid state physics and strongly correlated electron systems. He has co-developed the Cini-Sawatzky theory of the Auger effect and the ZSA (Zaanen-Sawatzky-Allen) classification of bandgaps in solids.

== Education and career ==
George A. Sawatzky earned in 1965 his B.S. in physics with Honours from the University of Manitoba and there in 1969 his PhD with thesis Some properties of Ferrimagnetic Spinels and their determination with the Mössbauer effect under the supervision of Allan H. Morrish. From 1969 to 1971 Sawatzky was a post-doc and member of the group led by Adrianus "Ad" J. Dekker and L. H. V. (Lucas) van der Woude at the University of Groningen and there from 1971 to 1979 was an associate professor and from 1979 to 1985 a professor in the Physical Chemistry Department. From 1985 to 2001 he was Professor of Applied and Solid State Physics at the University of Groningen. From 1986 to 1997 he was also director of the Materials Science Centre at the University of Groningen. In 2001 he was appointed a professor at the University of British Columbia. From 2002 to 2007, Sawatzky was Director of the Advanced materials and process engineering Laboratory at UBC and from 2010 to the present, he is Director of the Quantum Matter Institute and the MP/UBC Quantum Materials centre at UBC. He has been a visiting professor at the University of Osaka and the University of Paris.

== Research ==
Since 1966 Sawatzky has published in scientific journals more than 380 articles. His papers have been cited more than 28,000 times according to ISI Thomson. He has published 77 papers with more than 100 citations and his so-called H index (Hirsch index) is 87. According to CIFAR, his research "focuses on: electronic structure of nanostructured strongly correlated materials, such as magnetic materials, high temperature superconductors, and materials for electronics applications; the development and use of various synchrotron-based spectroscopic methods to study such systems; as well as theoretical methods to describe the relationship between the physical properties and the chemical composition, structure and morphology."

Sawatzky has made major contribution to the understanding of transition metal oxides (such as gamma and alpha Fe_{2}O_{3} and Fe_{3}O_{4}) and more generally correlated electron systems and also to the development of spectroscopic techniques suited to study the electronic structure of these systems. He generated some of the earliest ideas about effects such as transferred and, especially, supertransfered hyperfine fields and developed the theory to describe these in terms of the covalency of the Fe–O bonds. He pioneered the cluster approach now used in understanding the Fe-O-Fe bond angle, the superexchange interaction, and the supertransferred hyperfine fields, as well as the electronic structure of strongly correlated systems like the high temperature superconductors and colossal magneto resistance materials.

In the early 1970s Sawatzky and his co-workers used transport measurements and various resonant techniques like ESR and NMR to study spin echo NMR. The knowledge obtained concerning spin echo NMR led to the discovery of the so-called sand memory, which is a memory based on a powder of crystalline SiO_{2} in which the address of information is the frequency of an electromagnetic pulse and the content of such an address is observable in an echo at a time separation equal to that written perhaps a long time ago at the same frequency. The theory describing this effect was also developed by Sawatzky in collaboration with the solid state theorist Gerrit Vertogen.

In the 1980s Sawatzky showed how photoelectron and Bremsstrahlung isochromat spectroscopy could be used to determine the Hubbard U in magnetic impurity systems and rare earths. His group was the first to directly observe the exchange splitting of the Mn3d impurity states in the Kondo-like systems containing Mn impurities. His group also showed that the band gap in NiO was of a charge transfer type and not a Mott Hubbard type. Together with Jan Zaanen and James W. Allen, Sawatzky developed the ZSA model (which became widely used) for describing the basics of the electronic structure of 3d transition metal oxides.

In the mid 1980s Sawatzky was introduced to X-ray absorption spectroscopy and the use of synchrotron radiation by John Fuggle. Sawatzky and his group started a study of X-ray spectroscopies which form the basis for widely used spectroscopies at present. Over the past 3 decades he has led important research in theories and experiments related to strongly correlated materials.

== Honours and awards ==
- 1990 Elected Member of the Royal Netherlands Academy of Arts and Sciences (KNAW)
- 1996 NWO-Spinoza award (Netherlands Organization for Scientific Research)
- 1996 (and subsequent years) ISI list of highly cited
- 1997 Nieuwsblad van het Noorden prize
- 2002 Knight in the order of the Dutch Lion
- 2002 Elected Fellow of the Royal Society of Canada
- 2003 Elected Fellow of the American Physical Society
- 2007 RSC Henry Marshall Tory Medal
- 2008 Elected Fellow of the Royal Society of London
- 2011 IFW Dresden Leibnitz medal

== Editorial Boards ==
- 1992–1997 Editor of Journal of Physics and Chemistry of Solids
- 1994–2001 Journal of Electron Spectroscopy and Related Phenomena (Advisory Editorial Board)
- 2006–2010 Associate editor Europhysics Letters
