= Henry Marshall Tory Medal =

Award of the Royal Society of Canada

The Henry Marshall Tory Medal is an award of the Royal Society of Canada "for outstanding research in a branch of astronomy, chemistry, mathematics, physics, or an allied science". It is named in honour of Henry Marshall Tory and is awarded bi-annually. The award consists of a gold plated silver medal.

== Recipients ==
Source: Royal Society of Canada

- 2025 - Tucker Carrington
- 2023 - Eugenia Kumacheva, FRSC, FRS
- 2021 - Ian Manners, FRSC. Manuella Vincter, FRSC.
- 2019 - Jeff Dahn, FRSC
- 2017 - Mark Lautens, FRSC
- 2015 - Julio Navarro, FRSC
- 2013 - Douglas Stephan, FRSC
- 2011 - Arthur B. McDonald, FRSC
- 2009 - John Richard Bond, FRSC
- 2007 - George Albert Sawatzky, FRSC
- 2005 - David J. Lockwood, FRSC
- 2003 - Paul B. Corkum, FRSC
- 2001 - J. Bryan Jones, FRSC
- 1999 - James K.G. Watson, FRSC
- 1997 - James Greig Arthur, FRSC
- 1995 - Juan C. Scaiano, FRSC
- 1993 - Albert Edward Litherland, FRSC
- 1991 - Willem Siebrand, FRSC
- 1989 - Boris P. Stoicheff, FRSC
- 1987 - Keith J. Laidler, FRSC
- 1985 - Keith U. Ingold, FRSC
- 1983 - Ronald J. Gillespie
- 1981 - Alexander Edgar Douglas, FRSC
- 1979 - Nathan Mendelsohn
- 1977 - John Charles Polanyi, FRSC
- 1975 - William T. Tutte
- 1973 - Bertram N. Brockhouse
- 1971 - Harold E. Johns, FRSC
- 1969 - William G. Schneider, FRSC
- 1967 - Israel Halperin
- 1965 - Henry E. Duckworth, FRSC
- 1963 - Harry Lambert Welsh
- 1961 - R.M. Petrie, FRSC
- 1959 - Henry George Thode, FRSC
- 1957 - Carlyle Smith Beals
- 1955 - Edgar William Richard Steacie
- 1953 - Gerhard Herzberg, FRSC
- 1951 - Thorbergur Thorvaldson, FRSC
- 1949 - Harold Scott Macdonald Coxeter, FRSC
- 1947 - Eli Franklin Burton, FRSC
- 1946 - John Stuart Foster, FRSC
- 1945 - Otto Maass, FRSC
- 1944 - Frank Allen, FRSC
- 1943 - John Lighton Synge, FRSC

== See also ==
- List of general science and technology awards
- List of awards named after people
