= Albert Edward Litherland =

Canadian nuclear physicist

- Born: March 12, 1928 (age 97); Wallasey, United Kingdom
- Other names: Ted Litherland
- Education: University of Liverpool
- Occupation: Nuclear physicist
- Employer(s): National Research Council, Atomic Energy of Canada Limited, University of Toronto
- Known for: Accelerator mass spectroscopy

Albert Edward "Ted" Litherland (born 12 March 1928, in Wallasey, UK) is a nuclear physicist, known for his pioneering work in accelerator mass spectroscopy (AMS).

== Education and career ==
Litherland earned a BSc in 1949 and a PhD in 1955 from the University of Liverpool. From 1953 to 1955 he was a National Research Council Fellow and from 1955 to 1966 a career scientist at Chalk River Laboratories with Atomic Energy of Canada Limited. In 1966 he became a professor of physics at the University of Toronto and in 1979 a full professor, retiring as professor emeritus in 1993. In the academic years 1960–61 and 1972–73 he was a visiting professor at the University of Oxford.

Litherland and Allan Bromley were, in the words of J. C. D. "Doug" Milton, "two of the key people working on the van de Graaff accelerators, the 3 MV home-made single-ended machine, and beginning in 1958, the world's first tandem accelerator, the EN tandem. The unprecedented precision and flexibility of the EN tandem made Chalk River the envy of physicists around the world and opened up the field of heavy-ion physics. Allan Bromley is sometimes called the father of heavy-ion physics. Litherland was honoured first of all for his work on the 3 MV machine through which, and with his insight and courage, the first proof that the collective model could be applied to a light nucleus, in this case ^{25}Al. It led to a great simplification of our understanding of the spectra of such nuclei and directly to the Unified Model. Litherland went on to make critical contributions to nuclear structure research, primarily through the introduction, with John Ferguson, of new gamma-ray angular correlation techniques. In 1966, Litherland was recruited by the University of Toronto, and in 1967, he, along with Harry Gove and Ken Purser, realized the unique value of a tandem accelerator in measuring exquisitely minute quantities of ^{14}C. Thus was born accelerator mass spectrometry (AMS); for his contribution the University of Toronto made him a university professor. Litherland subsequently became the director of Isotrace, a facility that leads the world in the introduction of new AMS techniques."

== IsoTrace Laboratory ==
In 1982 Litherland was the director for the establishment of the IsoTrace Laboratory at the University of Toronto. The initiation of the creation of the ISOTRACE (ISOTope and Rare Atom Counting Equipment) Laboratory occurred in April 1979 with Litherland and Rolf P. Beukens as two of the most important scientists involved. While in operation from 1982 to its interim replacement period from 2008 to 2013, the laboratory used nuclear techniques in supersensitive mass spectrometers for archaeological dating, trace element detection, etc. In 2013 the IsoTrace Laboratory ceased operation and was fully replaced by the André E. Lalonde AMS Laboratory with upgraded equipment and facilities.

== Honours and awards ==
- 1971 – Gold Medal of the Canadian Association of Physicists
- 1974 – Rutherford Medal of the British Institute of Physics
- 1980 – Killam Scholarship
- 1986 – Guggenheim Fellowship
- 1993 – Henry Marshall Tory Medal (Royal Society of Canada)
- 1998 – Honorary Doctor of Science from the University of Toronto
