= Reaction dynamics =

Field of physical chemistry

Reaction dynamics is a field within physical chemistry, studying why chemical reactions occur, how to predict their behavior, and how to control them. It is closely related to chemical kinetics, but is concerned with individual chemical events on atomic length scales and over very brief time periods. It considers state-to-state kinetics between reactant and product molecules in specific quantum states, and how energy is distributed between translational, vibrational, rotational, and electronic modes.

Experimental methods of reaction dynamics probe the chemical physics associated with molecular collisions. They include crossed molecular beam and infrared chemiluminescence experiments, both recognized by the 1986 Nobel Prize in Chemistry awarded to Dudley Herschbach, Yuan T. Lee, and John C. Polanyi "for their contributions concerning the dynamics of chemical elementary processes", In the crossed beam method used by Herschbach and Lee, narrow beams of reactant molecules in selected quantum states are allowed to react in order to determine the reaction probability as a function of such variables as the translational, vibrational and rotational energy of the reactant molecules and their angle of approach. In contrast the method of Polanyi measures vibrational energy of the products by detecting the infrared chemiluminescence emitted by vibrationally excited molecules, in some cases for reactants in defined energy states.

Spectroscopic observation of reaction dynamics on the shortest time scales is known as femtochemistry, since the typical times studied are of the order of 1 femtosecond = 10^{−15} s. This subject has been recognized by the award of the 1999 Nobel Prize in Chemistry to Ahmed Zewail.

In addition, theoretical studies of reaction dynamics involve calculating the potential energy surface for a reaction as a function of nuclear positions, and then calculating the trajectory of a point on this surface representing the state of the system. A correction can be applied to include the effect of quantum tunnelling through the activation energy barrier, especially for the movement of hydrogen atoms.
