= William G. Schneider =

Canadian chemist (1915–2013)

William Schneider
- Born: William George Schneider; 1 June 1915
- Died: 18 February 2013 (aged 97)
- Education: University of Saskatchewan; McGill University
- Awards: FRS (1962); Henry Marshall Tory Medal (1969)
- Scientific career
- Institutions: Woods Hole Oceanographic Institution; Harvard University
- Thesis: I. War research – an investigation of some chemical warfare reagents II. An Investigation of the Physical Properties of a Two-Component System in the Critical Temperature, Critical Pressure Region (1941)

William George Schneider, OC FRS FRSC FCIC (1 June 1915, Wolseley, Saskatchewan – 18 February 2013 in Ottawa, Ontario) was a Canadian chemist and research administrator, who was president of the National Research Council of Canada from 1967 to 1980. He was president of IUPAC in 1983–1985.

== Education ==
Schneider earned BSc (1937) and MSc (1939) degrees in chemistry from the University of Saskatchewan and a PhD in chemistry in 1941 from McGill University.

== Career and research ==
With the aid of a Royal Society of Canada Fellowship, he conducted postdoctoral research at Harvard University for 3 years. From 1943 to 1946, Schneider was a research physicist at the Woods Hole Oceanographic Institute, where he conducted research on underwater explosions and anti-submarine weapons. In 1946 he became head of the Physical Chemistry Section of the National Research Council of Canada. At NRC, he was promoted in 1963 to director of the Division of Pure Chemistry, then in 1965 to vice-president (scientific), and in 1967 to president, retiring in 1980. He co-authored with John A. Pople and H. J. Bernstein the book High-resolution Nuclear Magnetic Resonance.

After retiring from the NRC in 1980, Schneider became a chemical consultant. According to The Canadian Encyclopedia, he "has published extensively in molecular forces, critical phenomena, ultrasonics, nuclear magnetic resonances and organic semiconductors."

In 1981, Schneider became a founding member of the World Cultural Council.

== Awards and honours ==
Schneider was elected a Fellow of the Royal Society (FRS) in 1962. In 1969 he was awarded the Henry Marshall Tory Medal.

== Books ==
- J.A.Pople; W.G.Schneider; H.J.Bernstein (1959). High-resolution Nuclear Magnetic Resonance. McGraw-Hill Book Company.
