= Eli Franklin Burton =

Canadian physicist

Eli Franklin Burton the third
- Born: February 14, 1879; Green River, Ontario, Canada
- Died: July 6, 1948 (aged 69); Toronto, Ontario, Canada
- Education: University of Toronto
- Known for: Building the first electron microscope in North America
- Awards: Henry Marshall Tory Medal (1947)
- Scientific career
- Fields: Physics
- Workplaces: University of Toronto

Eli Franklin Burton OBE, FRSC (February 14, 1879 – July 6, 1948) was a Canadian physicist.

Burton was born in Green River, township of Pickering, Ontario, Canada. He graduated from the University of Toronto in 1901. From 1904 to 1906 he studied colloids with J. J. Thomson at the Cavendish Laboratory at the University of Cambridge, writing an important monograph on the subject in 1938. He also wrote a college textbook on physics. He had become the head of the University of Toronto Physics Department in 1932.

Burton developed the first practical electron microscope at the University of Toronto in the late 1930s with the help of university students Cecil Hall, James Hillier, and Albert Prebus. He was made a fellow of the Royal Society of Canada and received the Henry Marshall Tory Medal in 1947. He was a member of the National Research Council of Canada and worked on radar research and training during World War II. Burton died in Toronto in 1948. There is now an award given in his name by the Electron Microscopy Society of America (https://web.archive.org/web/20110319105103/http://www.microscopy.org/awards/past.cfm#burton).
