= Susannah Oland =

Canadian businesswomen and brewer

- Born: Susannah Woodhouse Culverwell; 7 February 1818; West Monkton, Somerset, England
- Died: 24 March 1885 (aged 67); Richmond, Virginia, U.S.
- Burial place: Dartmouth, Nova Scotia, Canada
- Other name: Susannah Culverwell
- Occupations: brewer and businesswoman
- Years active: 1867-1885
- Known for: founding Moosehead Brewery

Susannah Oland (1818–1885) was an Englishwoman who immigrated to Canada and founded the Oland family. She was the creator of a beer recipe which became the basis for founding Canada's oldest independent brewery, Moosehead Brewery. Though she was credited with running the operation as well as acting as chief brewer, the business was incorporated in the name of her husband and sons. When her husband died, the partners sold their interests to a manager, whom Oland was able to buy out eight years later. She continued running the business until her death.

== Early life ==
Susannah Woodhouse Culverwell was born 7 February 1818 in West Monkton, Somerset, England, to Betty (née Grabham) and George Woodhouse Culverwell. In 1841, she was living in the household of Samuel and Ann Mogg. On 26 September 1842 at St. Stephen's Church in Bristol, Gloucestershire, England, Culverwell married John James Dunn Oland (1819-1870). The couple had nine children: Susannah Elizabeth (1843-1918), John Athelston (1844-1849), Charles Egbert (1846-1846), Ethelred Henry (1847-1899), John Culverwell (1849-1937), Conrad George (1851-1917), Huldah Sarah (1853-1933), Mary Stephens (1854-1945) and George Woodhouse Culverwell (1856-1933).

== Career ==
John supposedly studied as an Anglican minister at Cambridge, but worked as a tobacconist and a dealer in tea and beer in Bristol after he and Susannah married. He filed for bankruptcy in 1844, and then studied accounting, going to work at the London and South Western Railway. By 1851, the family had reestablished themselves sufficiently to hire a servant girl and a nurse, and were living in Trowbridge, Wiltshire, England. A decade later, the family of nine was farming near Hawley, by Farnborough, Surrey (now in Hampshire), England. In 1862, John immigrated to Nova Scotia, Canada, leaving Susannah to tend the farm and family. He was employed with the Nova Scotia Railway, a part of the intercontinental railway project and she brewed beer. Within three years, the family was reunited and rented a house in Dartmouth, where Susannah set up her brewing operation in the garden shed behind their home.

Captain Francis de Winton, a friend of the family, suggested that they market Susannah's "Brown October Ale" and John, whose time with the railway had ended, agreed. On 14 August 1867 the business was incorporated with John designated as manager, places set aside for three of his sons, with funds provided by de Winton, George Harvey and Thomas Mowbray. Though Susannah was the chief brewer and had been the inspiration for the business, her name was not on the agreement. Because they started the business in the Turtle Grove District of Dartmouth, it was called the Turtle Grove Brewery. Within a short time, there were nine employees and the business was the third largest operating in Dartmouth. John's name may have been on the paperwork, but Susannah ran the business.

When John died in a riding accident on 20 October 1870 Oland was left with no control over the brewery. Compounding matters, de Winton had been transferred to Gibraltar and the other two partners sold their interests to a manager, George Fraser, who had formerly been employed with a competing firm. Undaunted, Oland continued working at the brewery, which had been renamed the "Army and Navy Brewery", in honor of her biggest patrons. For eight years, the business operated under that name, though it was destroyed and rebuilt twice because of fire. In 1877, after receiving an inheritance from a relative in England, Oland bought out Fraser and published a notice of the partnership's dissolution in a Halifax newspaper. She began operating the brewery under the gender neutral name, "S. Oland, Sons and Company", training her sons to be brewmasters. For the remainder of her life, she worked at the brewery; as of 2011 she is the only woman to have run the business.

== Death and legacy ==
Oland died while spending the winter in Richmond, Virginia, on 24 March 1885. After her death, as her will had stipulated, control did not pass to her eldest sons, but rather to her youngest son, George, with provisions made for her daughter Hulda. The business she drove to be incorporated just 90 days after Canada's Confederation spawned two brewing dynasties in Canada, as after the 1917 Halifax explosion one branch of the family moved to Saint John, New Brunswick, later selling the Oland Brewery to Labatt Brewing Company, while the original company relocated to Halifax and later to Saint John. After several name changes, it became the Moosehead Brewery in 1947. It is the oldest independently operating and the largest privately owned brewery in Canada.
