= Killing of Richard Oland =

2011 Canadian homicide

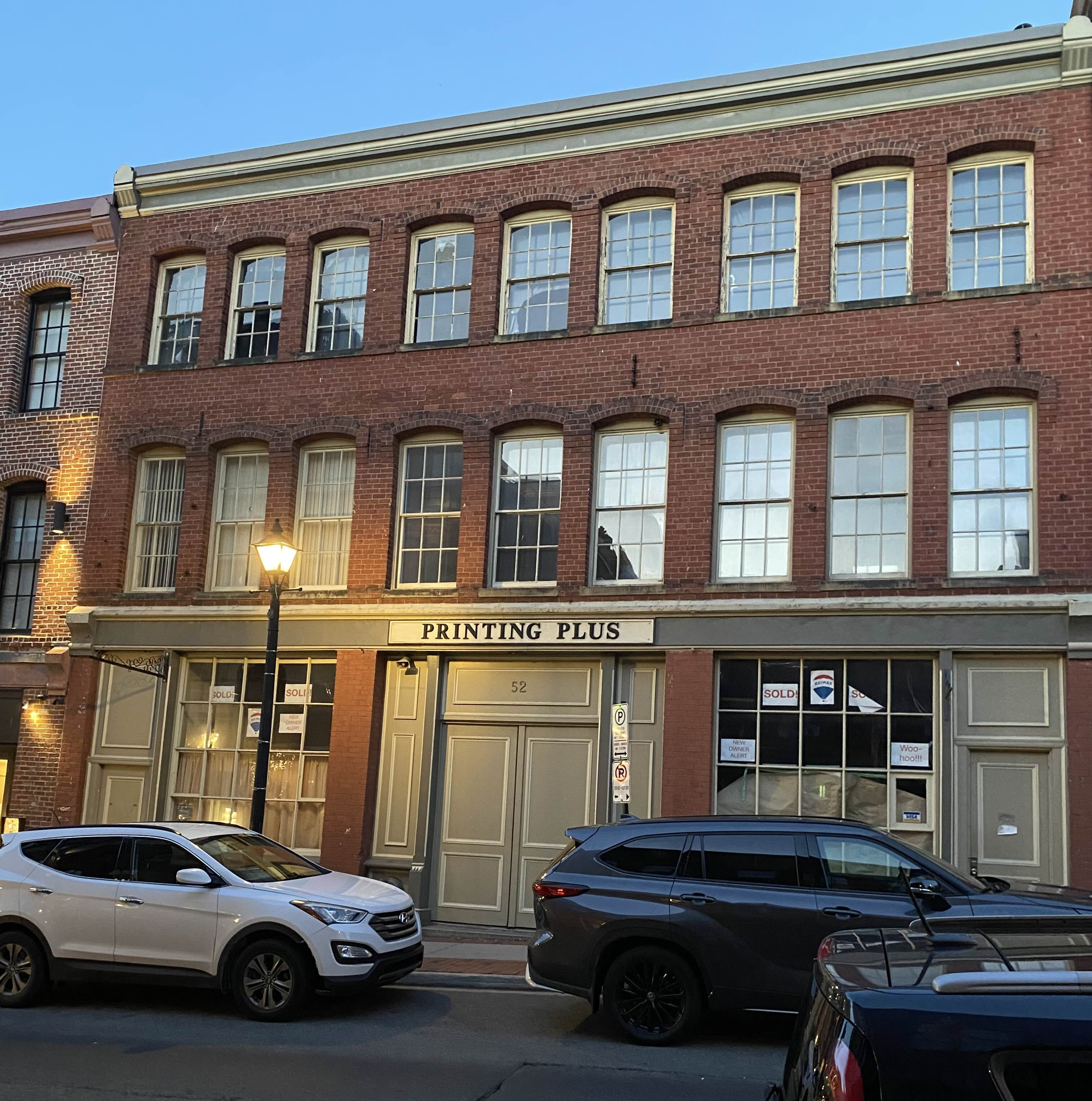
- 52 Canterbury Street, the building in which Oland was killed
- Date: July 7, 2011; 15 years ago
- Location: Canterbury Street, Saint John, New Brunswick, Canada; 45°16′19.1″N 66°3′39.5″W
- Type: Homicide by bludgeoning
- Deaths: Richard Henry Oland
- Accused: Dennis James Oland
- Verdict: Not guilty (2019 retrial); Guilty (2015; overturned)
- Convictions: Second-degree murder (overturned)
- Sentence: Life in prison with the possibility of parole after 10 years (2015; overturned)

On July 7, 2011, Richard Oland, a 69-year-old Canadian businessman and former vice-president for Moosehead Brewery, was bludgeoned to death in his office on Canterbury Street in Saint John, New Brunswick. His son, Dennis Oland, came under suspicion for the killing and was charged with second-degree murder.

Dennis' first trial, the longest and most expensive trial in the history of Saint John, ended with his conviction on December 19, 2015. Throughout the high-profile court case, intimate details about the private lives of the entire Oland family were revealed.

Dennis was sentenced to life in prison, with a possibility of parole in ten years, as recommended by the jury. His lawyers immediately began the appeals process, seeking the appellate judges to either overturn the guilty verdict, order a new trial, or enter a full acquittal. The appeal was successful, and Dennis' conviction was overturned on October 24, 2016. On July 19, 2019, he was found not guilty on retrial.

== Background ==
Richard Henry "Dick" Oland OC (1941 – July 7, 2011) was the second-born son to Philip Oland, chairman and CEO of Moosehead Breweries, and Mary Oland. Richard and his older brother Derek were born and reared in Rothesay, New Brunswick, a suburb of Saint John. Several families living in Rothesay, such as the Olands, the Irvings, and the Crosbys are considered "old money", claiming some of Canada's highest incomes per capita.

Richard attended Rothesay Collegiate School, Regiopolis College, and the University of New Brunswick, obtaining a certificate of brewing technology. He wed Constance "Connie" Connell in 1965, and fathered three children: Elizabeth, Jacqueline, and Dennis. Richard was diagnosed with Asperger syndrome by one of his friends, a clinical psychologist.

By 1980, Richard, then a vice-president of Moosehead Breweries, vied with Derek for leadership of the company in a public and legal feud. Their father decided to select Derek to succeed him, resulting in Richard leaving the company in 1981. Starting from scratch, Richard found a niche in the Saint John business community with his development of three major enterprises: Kinghurst Estates Limited, Brookville Transport Limited, and the investment firm Far End Corporation. Richard became an accomplished businessman, amassing many awards and a fortune of nearly C$37 million. He was also in charge of organizing the 1985 Canada Summer Games, serving as the Saint John 1985 Canada Summer Games Society president.

Richard made Far End Corporation's premises his primary office space. Located at 52 Canterbury Street in the historic Uptown district of Saint John, the second-floor office space was rented from building owner John Ainsworth. Ainsworth operated his own business, Printing Plus, from the first floor of the building, and rented out the third floor to local bands to practice after office hours ended for the day.

=== Oland family relationship ===
Richard was married to Constance "Connie" Oland for 46 years, though he also been in an eight-year relationship with his mistress, Diana Sedlacek. The Oland family has been characterized as having dysfunctional elements, with Constance telling authorities that Richard "did not get along with his brother, Derek Oland". Constance had also stated that Richard had "a very strong and controlling personality". An affidavit described that Richard "was not physically abusive but was emotionally and verbally abusive". Sedlacek told police that Richard did not have much respect for Dennis Oland, his only son, and "thought he was lazy". Constance similarly told investigators that Dennis frequently sought his father's respect, though "he had never been able to live up to his standards".

== Murder ==
Richard Oland was last seen alive in his office on July 6, 2011, where his son, Dennis, told police that he left at around 6:30 p.m. after around an hour of visiting the office. That same day, Oland was bludgeoned to death in his office. The last keystroke on his computer was recorded at 5:39 p.m., and Oland's iPhone, which had been the only object missing from the crime scene, last communicated at 6:44 p.m. through receiving a text message from Sedlacek.

=== Crime scene ===
On the morning of July 7, 2011, Oland's body was discovered lying face down in a pool of blood in his office by his personal assistant, Maureen Adamson. Sgt. Mark Smith of the Saint John Police Force testified that the office was "one of the bloodiest crime scenes of his career, with the most blows to a victim." Forensic pathologist Dr. Ather Naseemuddin counted 45 wounds to Richard's hands, neck and head during autopsy. Six of these wounds were found on Richard's hands, likely due to Richard trying to protect himself from his attacker. These defensive wounds led to over thirty hair and fibre exhibits to be seized at autopsy for forensic examination, including three hairs found inside his hands and tissue samples from under his fingernails. The hairs could not be tested for DNA as they were lacking a root, and only Richard's DNA was found underneath his fingernails.

The attack continued after Richard was defenseless on the floor. His skull had suffered catastrophic damage; the bones of his eyesockets were "like a cracked egg shell", possibly from him falling face-first into the floor, and a concave area spanning 10 cm in length, 7 cm across, and 2 cm deep was discovered at autopsy. Portions of brain matter were found on Richard's back.

The attack had left Richard's blood on every wall of his office. Blood spatter was seen on his desk, computer, chair, filing cabinets, and on an empty pizza box in the garbage can. Blood had also soaked through three layers of flooring, permeating the ceiling of the office below. Police analysts testified "the person who created these injuries would have significant bloodstains/spatter on their person and would be expected to transfer blood stains to the surfaces of other objects the person came in contact with." Forensic analysts noted the blood pooling on the floor around Richard may not have occurred until after the attacker left the office, explaining why the scene contained few "transfer stains" and only one footprint, which was never connected to a suspect.

Dr. Matthew Bowes, the physician who reviewed Dr. Nasseemuddin's autopsy report, believed Richard was alive for the duration of the attack. Both Naseemuddin and Bowes believed he only survived the attack for five to ten minutes, but was alive for all of his injuries. Some injuries were believed to have been caused by a sharp edged weapon, while other injuries were caused by blunt force, indicating that either Richard was killed by a weapon with two different edges or two weapons were used. Bowes raised the possibility that a combat knife could have been a weapon. Sgt. Mike King testified that he suspected a roofer's hatchet to be a weapon. Cst. Stephen Davidson believed a weapon could have been a drywall hammer. No weapons were found at the crime scene, and no weapons were entered as evidence at trial.

The trial revealed that members of the Saint John Police Force had failed to protect the crime scene from contamination. Police used the office bathroom, where blood belonging to Galen McFadden (the son of Richard Oland's financial manager, Robert McFadden) was later discovered, for two days before the bathroom was tested for evidence. There was a backdoor near where Richard's body was found, leading to an alleyway that could have been an exit. Police went in and out the main door, without gloves, for nearly a week before anyone noticed they should have tested it for fingerprints. The footprint discovered by the forensics team had to be compared against police footwear, as several police officers, including Deputy Chief Glen McCloskey, walked through the crime scene unauthorized and without protective gear. McCloskey was later accused of suggesting that other officers lie under oath about his presence at the crime scene, and the Saint John Police Force was under investigation by the New Brunswick Police Commission for corruption and a potential cover-up.

== Police interviews ==
Shortly after being notified of Richard's death, members of the Oland family, including his wife Connie Oland, daughters Lisa Bustin and Jacqueline Walsh, and son Dennis Oland, arrived at the police station to give interviews and formal statements.

Connie reported that on July 6, 2011, she and Richard were both at home until Richard received a call from Maureen Adamson at 9:50 am, reminding him of an appointment in his office with two insurance brokers at 10:00 am. Richard then left home for the office, and that was the last time Connie spoke with him. Connie said it was not uncommon for Richard not to return to their residence at night. His daughter Lisa Bustin was interviewed alone. Bustin said that her father could have had anyone as an enemy, as he was "a hard-nosed businessman—pure business—and if you worked hard you would get his respect."

Dennis' interview lasted over five hours and was separate from those of other family members. Video footage showed Dennis providing Cst. Davidson with a written and verbal account of his activities for the day prior to Richard's death. Dennis believed that his father had high expectations of him, but that he was not meeting those expectations. Davidson told Dennis that cameras could verify whether or not he was telling the truth about his presence at his father's office, and asked Dennis what clothing he had worn the day before. Dennis said he was wearing "these pants, these shoes, a blue dress shirt, and a navy blazer."

At the half-way mark on the video footage, Davidson informed Dennis that he was the primary suspect in his father's murder. Davidson read Dennis his rights, and Dennis phoned attorney Bill Teed, who told him to stop talking to police. Davidson told Dennis that "there is absolutely no question in my mind that you did this, and I want to know why", and that his opportunity to speak with a lawyer was past. Dennis repeated that he did not murder his father. Police allowed Dennis to leave just after 11:00pm without making an effort to seize the clothes Dennis said he had worn the day before.

Robert McFadden, in his interview, conducted by Davidson, said he had left Richard's office at 5:30 pm with his son, Galen McFadden, as was usual. McFadden said his job was to manage Richard's finances, and that Richard had asked that a trust fund be set up for his heirs. McFadden said that upon Connie's death, the trust would be dissolved and the remaining assets would be distributed to Richard's three children. He said that after Connie's death, Dennis' portion of his inheritance would be reduced by $538,000, with $269,000 going to each of Dennis' sisters, covering the expenses of his divorce – which had been paid for by Richard – and allowing Dennis to retain the family home.

McFadden and Adamson testified that Richard did not leave the office between arriving in the morning and Maureen leaving at 5:45 PM, and that Richard was adamant that alcohol not be kept in the office. Toxicology reports from the medical examiner indicate that Richard had some alcohol in his blood.

== Suspects ==
Two weeks after Richard's death, police said that they were convinced he was murdered by someone he knew. The McFaddens shared information to advance the investigation, with Galen McFadden giving a sample of his DNA in 2012, a year after the murder; Robert McFadden declined to give a DNA sample. Forensic testing revealed that blood matching Galen's DNA profile was found on the curtains of Richard's office, in the bathroom sink, and on a paper towel in the bathroom garbage can. One year after this discovery, officers covertly obtained Robert McFadden's DNA from a straw at a restaurant. The police forensics unit concluded the three areas where Galen's blood was found were unrelated to Richard's murder. No results concerning Robert's DNA were released.

== Forensic analysis ==
Sgt. Mark Smith, head of the forensics unit of the Saint John Police Force, reported that he spent three days following the July 14, 2011, search of Dennis' home doing a "very thorough search" of his car. Ten different areas of the car were swabbed, including the driver's side door inside latch and handle, the trunk release button, the headlight switch, signal light switch, the steering wheel, the emergency brake, and seats of the car. The swabs were sent away on July 21, 2011, for forensic testing at the RCMP crime lab in Nova Scotia, but no blood or DNA was detected through these tests. Smith did not find blood or DNA in the laces, stitching, or tread of any of the six pairs of shoes seized from Dennis' home, nor in the red reusable grocery bag Dennis had used to carry genealogy books into Richard's office on the day before his death. Smith did not find any blood in the keys of Dennis' BlackBerry cell phone, and Richard's DNA was not found anywhere on the phone.

For four hours on November 9, 2011, and one hour on November 17, 2011, Cst. David MacDonald visually inspected Dennis' brown jacket for blood, identifying five "reddish" spots, invisible to the naked eye, that required testing by the RCMP forensics lab in Nova Scotia. The jacket was sent to the RCMP lab on November 25, 2011, after the warrant for police seizure of the jacket had expired. Four spots on the jacket were confirmed to be blood that matched Richard's DNA—two spots on the outside right sleeve of the jacket, one spot on the outside upper-left chest of the jacket, and one spot on the outside back bottom hem near the center of the jacket.

== Charges ==
In November 2013, Dennis Oland was charged with second-degree murder for the death of his father. Police stated that no one else would be charged. Dennis entered a plea of "not guilty". On November 18, 2013, Justice Hugh McLellan of the New Brunswick Court of Queen's Bench granted Dennis bail on a $50,000 surety, paid by Dennis' uncle (and Richard's brother) Derek Oland, the executive chairman of Moosehead Breweries. Dennis was also ordered to surrender his passport and advise the Saint John Police Force if he planned to travel outside of the province.

== Preliminary inquiry ==
Provincial court Judge Ronald LeBlanc presided over the preliminary inquiry on December 12, 2014. He referred to the inquiry as a "screening mechanism" to review all of the evidence and rule whether or not he felt the case against Dennis was strong enough to warrant a trial. The preliminary inquiry ultimately spanned 37 days.

Crown Attorney John Henheffer said that Dennis may have had a financial motive to murder his father, and that Dennis may have asked his father for more money but was denied, triggering Dennis' murderous rage. LeBlanc told the Crown they had "failed to establish a reason for Dennis Oland to kill his father" as Connie, Richard's wife, received the $37 million inheritance, not Dennis. He also said the Crown had no evidence showing that Dennis asked for money or that being denied money would cause Dennis to be violent against his father.

Cell phone records were submitted showing Richard's phone, missing since the murder, had "pinged" off of a Rothesay tower at 6:44 pm on July 6, 2011, after Dennis left Richard's office, and near the location Dennis said he had stopped after visiting his father. A Rogers Communications analyst, from the cell service provider, testified that the 6:44 pm "ping" on July 6, 2011, was the last time Richard's cell phone was seen on the Rogers network. On July 9, 2011, the Rogers Communications computer system received a "roaming error", indicating the phone was not destroyed on July 9. LeBlanc, expressing surprise that Richard's cell phone company had shown Richard's phone to still be functioning three days after his murder, said he was not satisfied with the cell phone information, saying the records and test calls done by police did not provide sufficient evidence that the phone was "anywhere near that tower". He said "a jury could conclude Richard Oland's cell phone was outside Canada on July 9."

Maureen Adamson, Richard's personal assistant, testified that Dennis had greeted her upon his arrival at the office, where she was preparing to go home for the evening, and that Richard gave Dennis a "very friendly reception" at their meeting. She said Dennis was wearing a brown jacket when visiting his father. Forensic reports indicated the brown jacket contained four microscopic blood drops in the fabric, with DNA matching Richard or Derek. LeBlanc said that Adamson's testimony "would allow a jury to conclude as to an absence of animosity." The jacket evidence was a bit more confusing for LeBlanc. The Crown theorized that the brown jacket was dry cleaned to cover up the murder; the Defence contended the jacket was laundered by Dennis' wife because the Olands had visitation and funerals to attend, since his father was deceased.

LeBlanc indicated he felt the police presumed Dennis' guilt too quickly; "this conclusion on their part was totally unjustified and indeed irrational. The police merely had a hunch, and an unsubstantiated one at that." He asked why Dennis would keep a blood-stained jacket, but dispose of the murder weapon and phone. He also questioned why Dennis would keep the cleaning tag on after being told he was a suspect, along with the dry-cleaning receipt and his other clothing from the night of the murder did not contain any blood. LeBlanc felt that Dennis' behaviour after Richard's murder "appears to be inconsistent with the behaviour expected from someone who committed a crime of extreme violence." He agreed that Dennis had the opportunity to kill his father, that he had his father's DNA on the brown jacket he was wearing, that the brown jacket had been dry cleaned after Dennis was informed he was a suspect, that he told the police he was wearing a navy blazer, and that there were no signs the murder arose from a robbery or forced entry.

LeBlanc committed Dennis Oland to stand trial, and placed a publication ban over all of the contents of the preliminary inquiry, until after the trial verdict in December 2015.

== Trial and conviction of Dennis Oland ==
Justice Jack Walsh, the former prosecutor in the trial of Allan Legere, presided over Dennis Oland's trial. Walsh reviewed the admissibility of a number of evidence items submitted to the Crown by police prior to the murder trial. With about 5,000 prospective jurors being summoned from Saint John and Kings counties, 16 jurors were empanelled: 12 jurors with 4 alternates. becoming the largest jury pool in New Brunswick history, jury selection was held in the nearby hockey arena. The case was very highly publicised in the Saint John region, leading to some concerns over the Court's ability to conduct a fair trial.

Beginning on September 16, 2015, the Dennis Oland trial was the longest in the province's history at 65 days in length. The Court excluded a number of items from evidence due to police improprieties, including dishonest applications for search warrants and unlawful search and seizure.

Dennis Oland was convicted of second degree murder in December 2015 and sentenced to life in prison, with no possibility of parole for at least ten years. He was sent to the Atlantic Institution in Renous to begin his sentence. He spent ten months in the maximum security prison while his conviction was being appealed.

== Appeal ==
On October 24, 2016, the New Brunswick Court of Appeal overturned Dennis Oland's conviction on the basis that "the trial judge had erred in his instructions to jury on a 'key piece of the evidential puzzle' — whether Oland had 'lied' to police about what he was wearing the night they believe his multimillionaire father was killed", according to CBC News. The appeals panel ordered a new trial. Before a new trial was scheduled, the Crown attorneys said they would ask the Supreme Court of Canada for leave to appeal the ruling; the Defence said it might request a full acquittal from the same court.

== Retrial ==
For the retrial, Dennis' defense team focused on several aspects of the case which mainly boiled down to the timeline of events. Before the re-trial eventually started, the judge declared a mis-trial after it was found that a member of the local police force had used the police computer to gather information about members of the jury pool that could have been used to stack the jury in the prosecution's favour. This led to the trial being decided by the judge only. Based on the evidence of three witnesses, they established a reasonable doubt as to whether Dennis could have been at the scene of the crime when it occurred. Video evidence showed Dennis in Rothesay by about 7:30pm on the night of his father's death; two witnesses who had been in the building in a shop below Richard's office had testified hearing several thumping noises coming from upstairs between 7:30 and 8:00pm. While one of the two witnesses later recanted his estimate on the time he heard the sounds on the stand, his initial statement held. Another witness, who was sitting in a bar across the street, said he saw an unknown man exiting Richard's office building around the same time. Video evidence confirmed the timing of his assertion. Finally, the defence team established the presence of a vehicle parked near the office and leaving seven minutes later, corresponding with the alleged time of the murder. On July 19, 2019, Dennis Oland was found not guilty on retrial.

== Aftermath ==
The Provincial Police Commission launched an investigation into the mishandling of the Oland homicide investigation by the Saint John Police Force after the trial was completed. Deputy Chief Glen McCloskey was also investigated for his conduct, but was cleared by Halifax police and was not charged with any criminal offence.

According to Maclean's, the officers' "controversially—and almost comically—sloppy sleuths helped to explain the lack of evidence. While working on the crime scene, officers used the bathroom for two days before it could be tested for blood or fingerprints, and they could not always remember what they had touched around the office with bloodied gloves. The blood spatter expert did not arrive from Halifax until four days after the homicide, by which time the body had been removed and spatter had dried and flaked. Officers touched the back door before testing it for fingerprints, did not interview some witnesses for 18 months, and did not photograph the back alleyway until three years after the crime".

The CBC Television documentary series The Oland Murder, centred on Dennis Oland's appeal and retrial, premiered in 2020.
