= Brenda Bury =

English painter

- Born: 1932 (age 93–94); Brierley. near Barnsley, South Yorkshire, England
- Education: Barnsley High School; University of Reading (BFA)
- Occupation: Portrait artist
- Style: Portraiture
- Spouse: John Polanyi
- Website: www.brendabury.com

Brenda Bury (born 1932) is an English professional portrait artist who lives in Canada. She has painted members of the British Royal Family, the aristocracy, and politicians in the British and Canadian governments.

== Early life and education ==
Bury was born in Brierley. near Barnsley, South Yorkshire, England, in 1932.

When she was seven years old, she won a National Savings painting competition and, at the age of 12, won a youth club painting competition. She attended Barnsley High School.

Bury later studied Fine Art at the University of Reading with J. Anthony Betts, where she received her Bachelor of Fine Arts degree. As a student, she was given brushes originally owned by James McNeill Whistler by a University of Reading Professor.

== Career ==
Bury's work is influenced by historic portraiture painters, such as Anthony Van Dyck, Joshua Reynolds and John Singer Sargeant.

Bury has painted many notable subjects of Great Britain and Canada including Queen Elizabeth II, Margaret Thatcher, John Diefenbaker, Tony Benn, Quintin Hogg, Agnes Benidickson, Guy Charbonneau, Sterling Lyon, Cecil Madden, Lord Mountbatten, Maurice Duplessis, Charles Polanyi, Jeanne Sauvé, Sally Ann Howells and John Napier Turner.

Her portrait of Kenneth Peacock Tynan is held in the collection of the National Portrait Gallery, London. Her portrait of Alfred Edward McVie, when he was Mayor of Barnsley in the 1950s, and his wife is held in the collection of the Barnsley Museums.

In 1991, Bury held her first public painting performance, completing a painting of Arlene Perly Rae and her eldest daughter Judith.

== Personal life ==
Bury is married to Nobel Prize-winning Canadian chemist John Polanyi. She moved to Canada in the 1980s and they are based in Toronto.
