= Victor de Bedia Oland =

Canadian politician (1913–1983)

The Honourable Victor de Bedia Oland OC ED CD

24th Lieutenant Governor of Nova Scotia
- In office July 22, 1968 – October 1, 1973
- Monarch: Elizabeth II
- Governor General: Roland Michener
- Premier: G.I. Smith; Gerald Regan
- Preceded by: Henry Poole MacKeen
- Succeeded by: Clarence Gosse

Personal details
- Born: August 9, 1913 Halifax, Nova Scotia
- Died: June 27, 1983 (aged 69) Halifax, Nova Scotia
- Spouse: Nancy Jane Medcalfe
- Relations: Sidney Culverwell Oland (father)
- Children: Sidney Culverwell, Evelyn Susan, Peter deBedia, Victoria Herlinda
- Education: Dalhousie University
- Occupation: Brewer
- Profession: Businessman

Military service
- Allegiance: Canada
- Branch/service: Canadian Militia; Canadian Army
- Years of service: 1929 - 1950; 1956 - 1960
- Rank: Captain; Lieutenant-Colonel; Brigadier General
- Unit: Royal Canadian Artillery
- Commands: 1st Halifax Artillery (Hon. Colonel)
- Battles/wars: Second World War: Pacific War

Victor de Bedia Oland, OC ED CD (August 9, 1913 – June 27, 1983) was a member of the Oland family and served as the 24th Lieutenant Governor of Nova Scotia from 1968 to 1973.

== Awards and recognition ==

In 1980, he was made an Officer of the Order of Canada.
