= John Sawyer (meteorologist) =

John Stanley Sawyer FRS (19 June 1916 – 19 September 2000) was a British meteorologist, and Fellow of the Royal Society.

== Life ==
He was born in Wembley, Middlesex and educated at the Latymer Upper School, Hammersmith and Jesus College, Cambridge.

He started his career as a Technical Officer with the Meteorological Office involved in weather forecasting for RAF stations during World War II and was then sent to India to be involved in co-ordinating the meteorological service in South-East Asia Air Command (1943). On his return he joined the staff of the Forecast Research Division, Dunstable at its inception in 1949.

== Work ==
He was Chairman of British National Committee for Geodesy and Geophysics (1961), Assistant Director (Dynamical Research) at the Meteorological Office, Director of Research at the Meteorological Office (1965–1976) and President of the Commission for Atmospheric Sciences, World Meteorological Organisation (1968–1973). He retired in 1976.

== Publications ==
Sawyer published the study Man-made Carbon Dioxide and the "Greenhouse" Effect in 1972. He summarised the knowledge of the science at the time, the anthropogenic attribution of the carbon dioxide greenhouse gas, distribution and exponential rise, findings which still hold today. Additionally he accurately predicted the rate of global warming for the period between 1972 and 2000.

The increase of 25% CO2 expected by the end of the century therefore corresponds to an increase of 0.6 °C in the world temperature – an amount somewhat greater than the climatic variation of recent centuries.

— John Sawyer, 1972

== Awards ==
He was elected a Fellow of the Royal Society in 1962. His candidature citation read "Mr. Sawyer is recognised as a leader in meteorological research, both in this country and abroad. With F.H. Bushby he devised the well-known 'baroclinic' model for numerical forecasting, using electronic computation, which is rightly regarded as a landmark in this difficult subject. His work on the characteristics of fronts is one of the few successful attempts to deal quantitatively with the dynamics (as distinct from the kinematices) of these important phenomena. He has done markedly original work on dynamical similarity in meteorology and his recent numerical calculations of air flow over mountains are believed to be the first realistic computations of their kind. In addition, he has contributed much to the detailed analysis of the salient features of large-scale atmospheric disturbances, including studies of the rainfall of depressions, the behaviour of the tropopause, and the cloud systems associated with fronts. His work is characteristic of the younger school of dynamical meteorologists, and is doing much to make meteorology a more exact science than hitherto."

He was also a Fellow of the Meteorological Society (FRMetS) and their president from 1963 to 1965. He was awarded their Symons Gold Medal in 1971 and the International Meteorological Organization Prize in 1973.
