= Moosehead Breweries =

Canada's oldest independent brewery

Coordinates: 44°58′41.26″N 65°24′40.47″W

Moosehead Breweries Limited
- Industry: Alcoholic beverage
- Founded: 1867
- Founder: Susannah Oland and family
- Headquarters: Saint John, New Brunswick, Canada
- Products: Beer
- Owner: Oland family
- Website: www.moosehead.ca

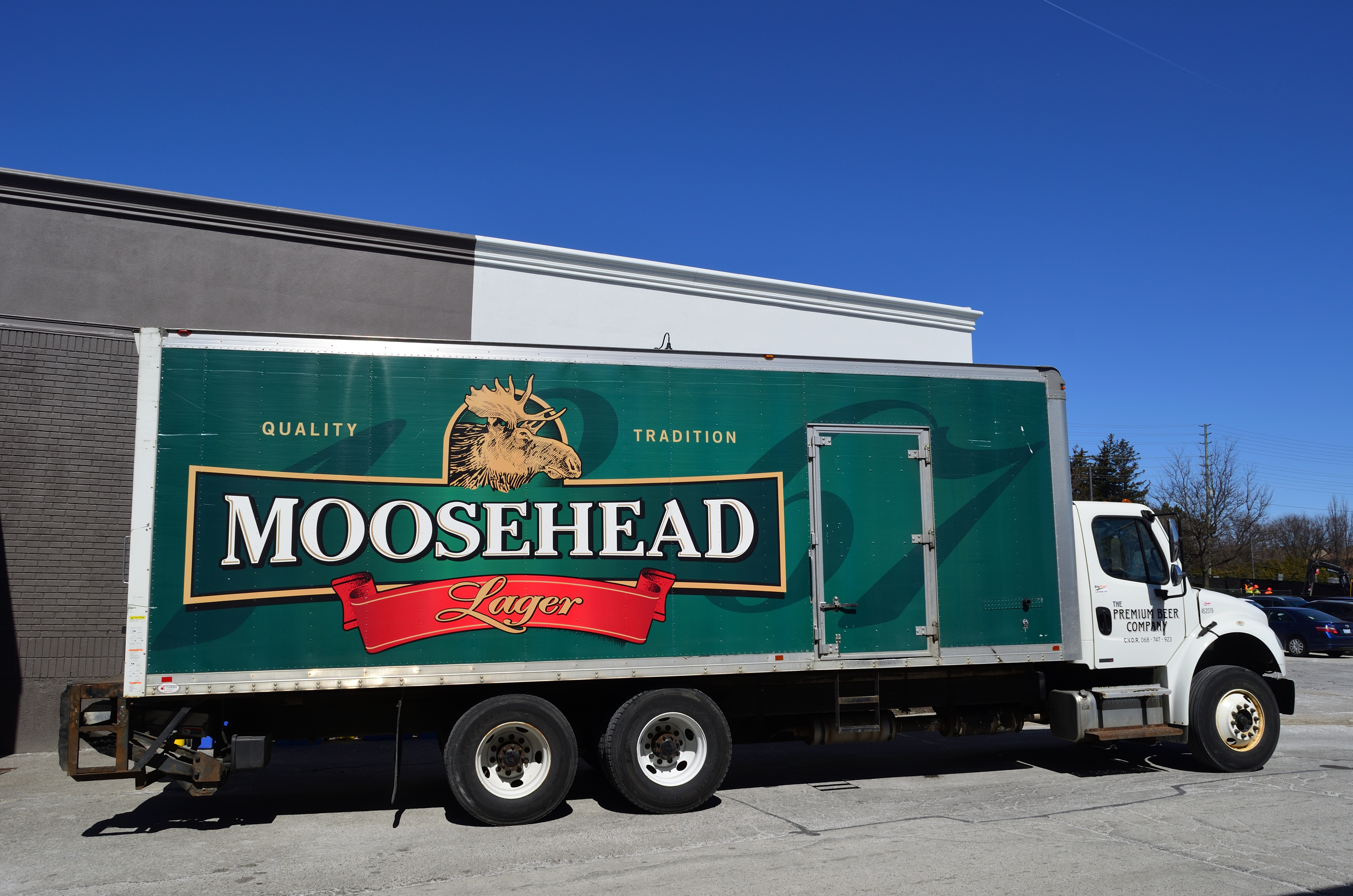
Moosehead truck

Moosehead Breweries Limited is Canada's oldest independent brewery, located in Saint John, New Brunswick. The brewery was founded in 1867 and is still privately owned and operated by the Oland family. The company is now in the sixth generation of family ownership.

In 2002, Moosehead Lager won a Bronze award at the World Beer Cup. In 2004, Moosehead Lager once again won a Bronze award. In 2015, Moosehead won a single Gold award in the Canadian Brewing Awards where most of the winners are craft beers. In 2016, two of the company's products won a Gold and a Silver award, respectively.

This company had an estimated four percent share of the Canadian domestic market in 2018. Since all major competitors are owned by multi-nationals, Moosehead is now the largest fully Canadian-owned brewer. This is a private company that is not required to release financial information, but the IBISWorld Industry Report on Breweries in Canada stated the company was expected to generate $263.8 million in revenue over 2016.

== History ==
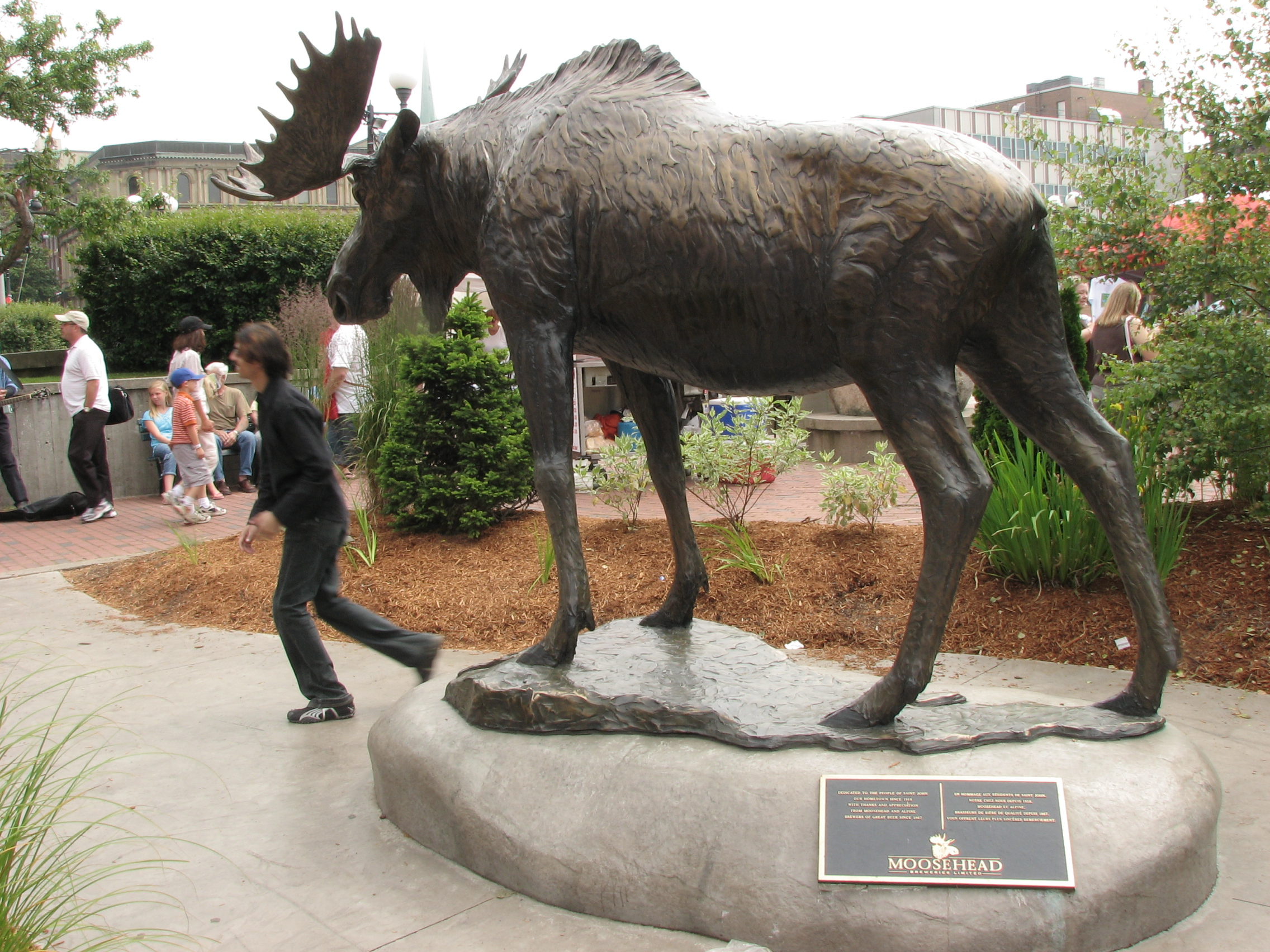
Statue given by Moosehead Breweries to the people of Saint John, New Brunswick

In 1865, Susannah Oland moved from England to Nova Scotia, Canada. With her husband John and nine other employees, Susannah opened The Army and Navy Brewery in 1867, a name that came after their most appreciative customers. After John Oland's untimely death in 1870, the brewery changed its name to S. Oland, Sons and Co. Over the next eight years, the brewery faced two fires, but recovered after each. In 1886, Susannah Oland died, and the company went to her two sons, Conrad and George. With the approach of the 20th century, the company changed its name to the Maritime Brewing & Malting Co. It faced hard times once again when the Halifax Explosion of 1917 killed Conrad Oland and destroyed the brewery. A year later, George Oland and his sons moved to Halifax and bought another brewery. In 1928, George bought a second, larger brewery in the city of Saint John, New Brunswick, site of the present day facility.

In 1931, the symbol of the moose came into existence as George launched Moosehead Pale Ale. After the success of its Pale Ale, the Oland-owned brewery changed its name to Moosehead Breweries Ltd. in 1947. Thirty-one years later, in 1978, the brewery president Philip Oland expanded the brand and launched Moosehead Lager in the United States. In 1982, Derek Oland, then the president of the company (after succeeding his father P.W. Oland), expanded the company worldwide.

In his autobiography Lucky Man, Michael J. Fox relayed how he told Jay Leno as a guest on The Tonight Show, that he did not like American beer, describing it as 'too watery' and that he instead would drink Moosehead Ale. Not long afterwards, a huge truckload of Moosehead Ale made its way to Fox's house as a free gift from the company.

Once a popular premium import beer in the United States that was distributed by RJR Nabisco, Moosehead lost vast market share in the 1980s when it lowered its price in an attempt to compete with larger US brewers on price instead of quality and prestige.

In 2008, Derek Oland's sons Andrew, Patrick, and Matthew assumed leadership of Moosehead. As of 2019, Andrew is the president and Patrick is the CFO. Matthew has assumed the role of CEO of Joint Venture, a collaboration between Sproutly and Moosehead to sell cannabis-infused beverages.

Moosehead sells its beer throughout Canada, in many US locations, and in 15 countries around the world. Moosehead USA has recently become its own importer, replacing its importing partner Gambrinus. Moosehead wholly owns the Niagara Falls Brewing Company in Ontario.

In 2005, Moosehead Lager won Gold at the prestigious Monde Selection; the company had also won Gold medals at the World Beer Cup and 2003 Canadian Brewing Awards.

In 2008, Moosehead sold its minority interest in McAuslan Brewing to Les Brasseurs RJ. McAuslan will continue to brew and distribute Moosehead beer in the province of Quebec. In the same year, Derek Oland's son Andrew assumed the role of President.

The annual Canadian Brewing Awards recognizes the best beers in Canada using blind taste tests. Most of the 2015 and 2016 winners were craft beers. However, some were made by larger brewers, including Moosehead; this company won a Gold in 2015 for their Pale ale and a Gold and Silver, respectively for their Alpine Lager and Cracked Canoe in 2016. For the 2017 competition, new rules allow for entries only from fully Canadian-owned breweries (and that includes Moosehead) for the 55 categories of beer.

In June 2016, the company announced plans to build a small-batch brewery. In January 2017 however, Moosehead announced that the plan had been cancelled because it could not be achieved within the intended budget.

In addition to overwhelming success, the Oland dynasty has also experienced tragedy with the Murder of Richard Oland who had been a Vice President of Moosehead until 1981. (Richard Oland had vied with his brother Derek for the control of Moosehead. Their father, P.W. Oland, decided to select Derek to succeed him as president; Richard subsequently left the company.) On July 7, 2011, the body of 69-year-old Richard Oland was found dead in his Saint John office at the investment firm Far End Corp. Oland had been bludgeoned to death. His son Dennis Oland, a financial planner, was charged in 2015 with second degree murder. Throughout the high-profile court case, intimate details about the private lives of the entire family were revealed. On conviction in December 2015, Dennis Oland was sentenced to life in prison, with no possibility of parole for at least 10 years.

Less than a year later, in October 2016, the New Brunswick Court of Appeal threw out his conviction based on errors made by the trial judge, and ordered a new trial. The Crown attorneys said they would ask the Supreme Court of Canada for leave to appeal the lower court ruling; the defense said it might request a full acquittal from the Supreme Court.

In 2018, the company decided to redesign the labeling of its products for a "fresh and modern look and to attract millennial consumers while not alienating an older demographic", starting in April. At the time, Moosehead products had a 4% market share in Canada, and 5% in the province of Ontario.

In 2019, the Canadian Premier League announced that Moosehead would be the official domestic brewery for the league.

In 2025, Moosehead Breweries introduced the "Presidential Pack", which contained 1,461 cans of Canadian lagers. The pack was promoted as a way to endure political uncertainty and was available for purchase on the brewery’s website for CAD 3,490 plus tax and deposit.

== Stolen batch ==
In August 2004 a truck driver transporting over 50,000 cans of Moosehead beer to Mexico for a Mexican supermarket chain disappeared with the beer, leaving the nearly empty transport truck abandoned in a parking lot in Grand Falls, New Brunswick. Easily identified by the Spanish writing on the labels (which is not distributed in English and French speaking Canada) the beer was slowly tracked.

The first signs of the missing beer showed up in Fredericton, New Brunswick, with two empty cans; another report of two cans were reported later in northern New Brunswick. Police working on a tip eventually found the truck driver in Ontario; earlier in the same week, police discovered nearly 8,000 cans of the stolen beer in a trailer that went off the road near Woodstock, New Brunswick.

With most of the beer recovered and the driver in custody, the police in the New Brunswick area began to look in wooded areas for the remaining beer. Knowing the area in which the police were looking, many civilians took up the search as well. Because of the media attention on the story almost all of the beer was quickly found by civilians and police, and most of it was returned to Moosehead Breweries.

The final piece of the story occurred in October 2004 when 200 cans of the stolen beer were found at a marijuana growing operation in the forest near Doaktown, New Brunswick about 100 kilometres northeast of Fredericton. "Six of the cans were discovered with bite marks in them indicating a bear had, at one point, been into the beer," the RCMP said in a news release. The release said there was no sign of either the animal or the people who had stashed the beer. Eventually, after a lengthy investigation, a total of 14,000 cans were recovered. Wade Haines, a New Brunswick truck driver, was found guilty of stealing the shipment and was sentenced to 19½ months in jail.

The nature of this crime story made international headlines and resulted in publicity for Moosehead; it has also been the basis of a book.

== Second stolen batch ==
In September 2007, two tractor trailers carrying 77,000 cans and 44,000 bottles with a reported retail value of $200,000 were stolen from a transport company in Mississauga, Ontario. Peel Region police arrested a man from Vaughan, Ontario during the first week of October 2007 and charged him with possession of stolen property. Police believe he is responsible for the theft and of selling the beer to bars and after-hours clubs and that he may not have worked alone.

== Brands ==
Moosehead and its subsidiary The Premium Beer Company brew/market the following beverages:

- Moosehead Lager
- Moosehead Breweries Anniversary Ale
- Moosehead Pale Ale
- Alpine Lager
- Cracked Canoe
- Moose Light Lager
- Moose Light Radler
- Moose Light Radler Raspberry
- Moose Light Radler Watermelon
- Moosehead Premium Dry
- Moosehead Dry Ice
- Moosehead Dry Light
- Moosehead Dry Lager
- Twisted Tea Original, Half & Half and Raspberry
- Coney Island Root Beer
- Coney Island Orange Cream
- Coney Island Lemon Lime
- Estrella Damm
- Daura Damm
- Inedit
- Truly Spiked & Sparkling
- Angry Orchard Hard Cider
- Hop City Brewing Co.
- Ten-Penny Old Stock Ale

== See also ==
- Beer in Canada
- Halifax Mooseheads
- List of breweries in Canada
- Murder of Richard Oland
