= Anne Øland =

Background information
- Born: 16 January 1949; Assens
- Died: 15 September 2015 (aged 66)
- Instrument: Piano
- Years active: 1959–2015
- Labels: Paula, Classico

Anne Stampe Øland (16 January 1949 – 15 September 2015) was a Danish concert pianist and educator who was known for her interpretations of the works of Beethoven and Carl Nielsen.

== Biography ==
Øland was born in Assens on the island of Funen on 16 January 1949. She grew up in Rudme in central Funen. From the age of 4, she became interested in music encouraged by her parents, Knud Stampe Øland and his wife Astrid, who were both school teachers with a special interest in gymnastics. From the age of seven, Øland accompanied her father's gym pupils on the piano. In 1959, when she was 10, she played at a gymnastics presentation in Vejle in the presence of King Frederik IX.

After completing her high school education at Nykøbing Mors, Øland attended the Royal Danish Conservatory in Copenhagen where she studied under Herman D. Koppel, graduating in 1977. She continued her studies in Rome with Guido Agosti, Salzburg with Hans Leygraf and Geneva with Nikita Magaloff. She taught at the conservatory from 1980 to 2004 when she moved to the Aarhus Music Academy, receiving the title of professor in 2007.

For over 30 years, she was one of Denmark's leading pianists, performing both as a soloist and in chamber orchestras. She was the only Danish pianist to have played not only all of Carl Nielsen's works for piano but all 32 Beethoven sonatas. The latter she played in the Tivoli Concert Hall in 2002, devoting seven evening performances to the works. There are recordings of her complete Carl Nielsen Works for Solo Piano (1988) and of her Complete Piano Sonatas of Beethoven (2009).

Øland was also a leading light as an educator, instructing celebrities such as Katrine Gislinge, Christina Bjørkøe, Nikolaj Koppel and Tanja Zapolski.
