= Philip Oland =

Canadian businessman

Philip Warburton Oland, OC CD (July 11, 1910 – November 29, 1996) was a Canadian businessman and former chairperson and CEO of Moosehead Breweries Limited.

In 1930, he received a B.Sc. from the University of New Brunswick.

In 1970, he was made an Officer of the Order of Canada. Philip Warburton (P.W.) Oland was the majority owner of Moosehead Breweries, the majority owner of the Halifax Mooseheads major junior hockey franchise, a soldier and WWII veteran, a patron of the arts and a volunteer.

Born in Halifax on July 11, 1910, Mr. Oland moved to Saint John with his family in 1917 in the aftermath of the Halifax Explosion. He earned a Bachelor of Science Degree in Chemistry in 1930 from the University of New Brunswick and studied brewing and malting in England and Copenhagen. He joined the family business, Moosehead Breweries Ltd., in 1932 as head brew master, creating Alpine Lager, which would become, and remains, one of the most popular beers in the Maritimes. He took on the role of President and CEO of Moosehead in 1961, becoming the fourth generation of his family to manage operations at Canada’s oldest brewery. During this tenure, he guided the family business through a period of remarkable growth, launching Moosehead beer in the United States, which would eventually account for 40 per cent of the company’s production. He was also instrumental in expanding to Great Britain and Australia.

A Canadian, Mr. Oland served as Captain in the 3rd Division Artillery during World War II. Following the war, he became Militia Group Commander for the West New Brunswick District, retiring in 1961 as Brigadier. A life member of the New Brunswick Army Cadet Corps, he served for 18 years as Honorary Colonel to New Brunswick’s 3rd Field Artillery Regiment (the Loyal Company).

Mr. Oland was a committed community leader who gave generously of his time and support to numerous organizations. He played a key role in the establishment of the University of New Brunswick in Saint John and founded the Greater Saint John United Way, the New Brunswick Youth Orchestra and the Rothesay Pony Club. He was a long-time supporter of Atlantic universities, especially the University of New Brunswick in Saint John to which he donated the Mary O, a marine biology research vessel that has contributed greatly to the growth of the marine biology program. In 1992, UNBSJ named Philip W. Oland Hall in his honour. He served as President of the Saint John Board of Trade and took on roles with numerous other boards, including the University of New Brunswick, St. Thomas University, the Lester B. Pearson College of the Pacific and the Canadian Council of Business and the Arts in Canada.

A patron of the arts, Mr. Oland was the national chairman of fundraising for the Confederation Centre of the Arts in Charlottetown, helped lead the efforts to restore the Imperial Theatre in Saint John and supported the Beaverbrook Art Gallery, Theatre New Brunswick and Opera New Brunswick. Among his awards and honors: Officer of the Order of Canada, the Coronation Medal, the Centennial Medal, the Canadian Forces Decoration, the Canadian Silver Jubilee Medal and Freeman of the City of Saint John. He also has honorary degrees from St. Thomas University, Saint Francis Xavier University, Mount Allison University, the University of New Brunswick and the University of Prince Edward Island.

He died on November 29, 1996, at the age of 86.
