= Edgar Steacie =

Canadian physical chemist

- Born: Edgar William Richard Steacie; December 25, 1900; Montreal, Quebec
- Died: August 28, 1962 (aged 61); Ottawa, Ontario
- Education: McGill University
- Awards: Henry Marshall Tory Medal (1955); Fellow of the Royal Society
- Scientific career
- Fields: Physical chemistry

Edgar William Richard Steacie (December 25, 1900 – August 28, 1962) was a Canadian physical chemist and president of the National Research Council of Canada from 1952 to 1962.

== Education ==
Born in Montreal, Quebec, the only child of Richard Steacie and Alice Kate McWood, he studied a year at the Royal Military College of Canada. In 1923, he received his Bachelor of Science degree and his Ph.D. in 1926 from McGill University.

== Career ==
From 1926 to 1939, Steacie taught at McGill University. In 1939, he joined the National Research Council as director of the division of chemistry. In 1950, he became vice-president (scientific) and, in 1952, president.

== Awards and honours ==
Steacie was appointed an Officer of the Order of the British Empire for his contributions during the Second World War. From 1954 to 1955, he was the president of the Royal Society of Canada. In 1961, he was elected president of the International Council of Scientific Unions. He was president of the Faraday Society. He was a foreign associate of the National Academy of Sciences. He was an honorary Fellow of the Chemical Society.

In 1948, he was made a Fellow of the Royal Society. He was also a Fellow of the Royal Society of Canada and was awarded the Henry Marshall Tory Medal in 1955. He is a member of the Canadian Science and Engineering Hall of Fame.

The Steacie Science and Engineering Library at York University, the Steacie Building for Chemistry at Carleton University, the NSERC E.W.R. Steacie Memorial Fellowship, and the Steacie Prize are named in his honour.

Professional and academic associations
| Preceded by Jean Bruchési | President of the Royal Society of Canada; 1954–1955 | Succeeded by George Sherwood Hume |
