= Bluenose one-design sloop =

Sailboat class

Bluenose
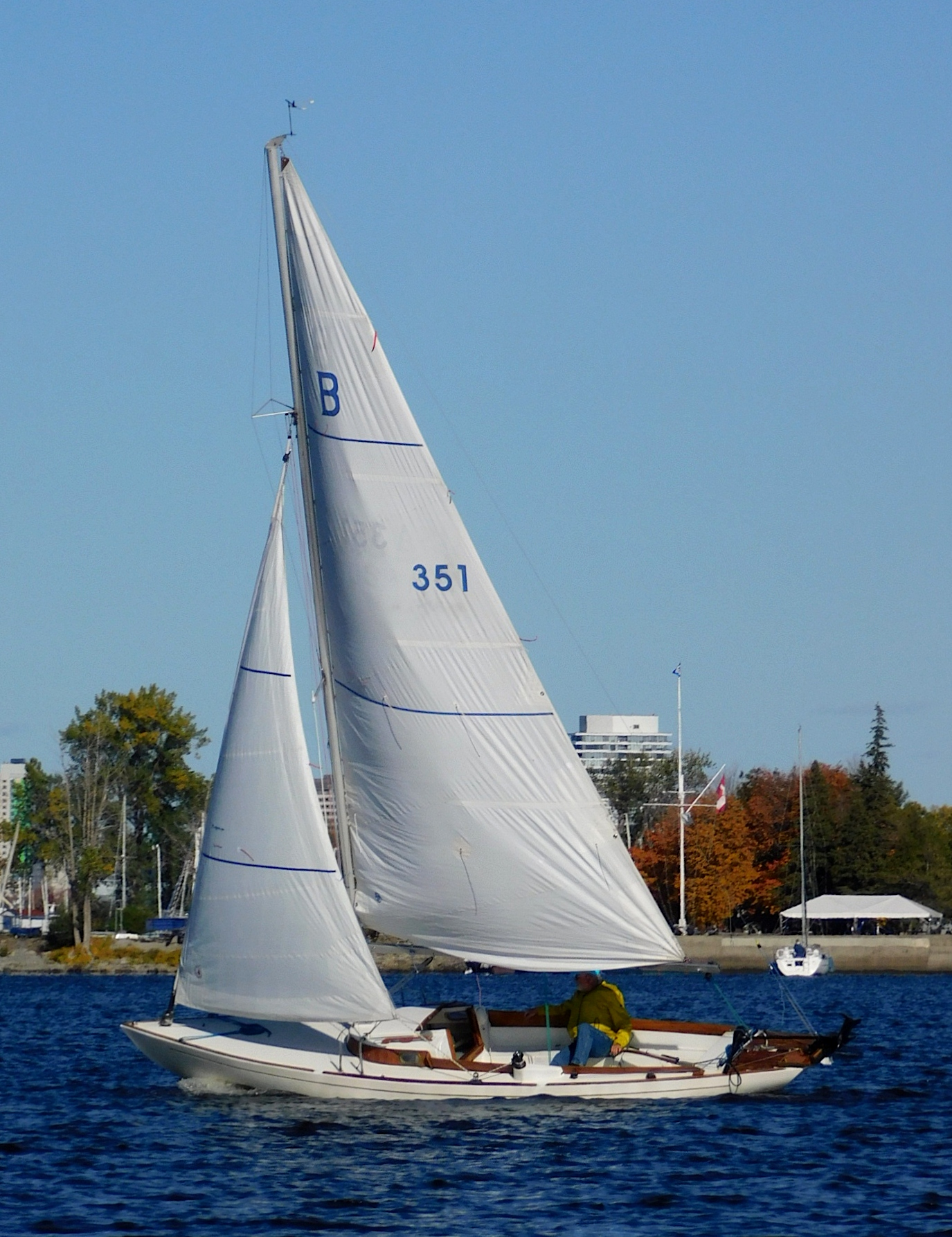
- A later, fibreglass Bluenose with cuddy-cabin.

Development
- Designer: William James Roué
- Location: Canada
- Year: 1946
- No. built: 180
- Builders: Barkhouse Boatyard; McVay Fiberglass Yachts; Herring Cove Marine; Snyder's Shipyard
- Name: Bluenose

Boat
- Displacement: 2,050 lb (930 kg)
- Draft: 2.33 ft (0.71 m)

Hull
- Type: Monohull
- Construction: Wood or, later, Fiberglass
- LOA: 23.42 ft (7.14 m)
- LWL: 16.00 ft (4.88 m)
- Beam: 6.25 ft (1.91 m)
- Engine: Outboard motor

Hull appendages
- Keel: long keel
- Ballast: wooden design 750–755 lb (340–342 kg) lead, fiberglass design 875–900 lb (397–408 kg) cast iron
- Rudder: keel-mounted rudder

Rig
- Rig type: Bermuda rig
- I foretriangle height: 20.00 ft (6.10 m)
- J foretriangle base: 6.80 ft (2.07 m)
- P mainsail luff: 26.30 ft (8.02 m)
- E mainsail foot: 12.00 ft (3.66 m)

Sails
- Sailplan: Fractional rigged sloop
- Mainsail area: 157.80 sq ft (14.660 m^{2})
- Jib/genoa area: 68.00 sq ft (6.317 m^{2})
- Total sail area: 218 sq ft (20.3 m^{2})

The Bluenose is a Canadian sailboat class, that was designed by William James Roué as a one design racer and first built in 1946. Roué was also the designer of the Bluenose racing schooner, built in 1921. The term Bluenoser is a nickname for people from Nova Scotia.

== Design ==
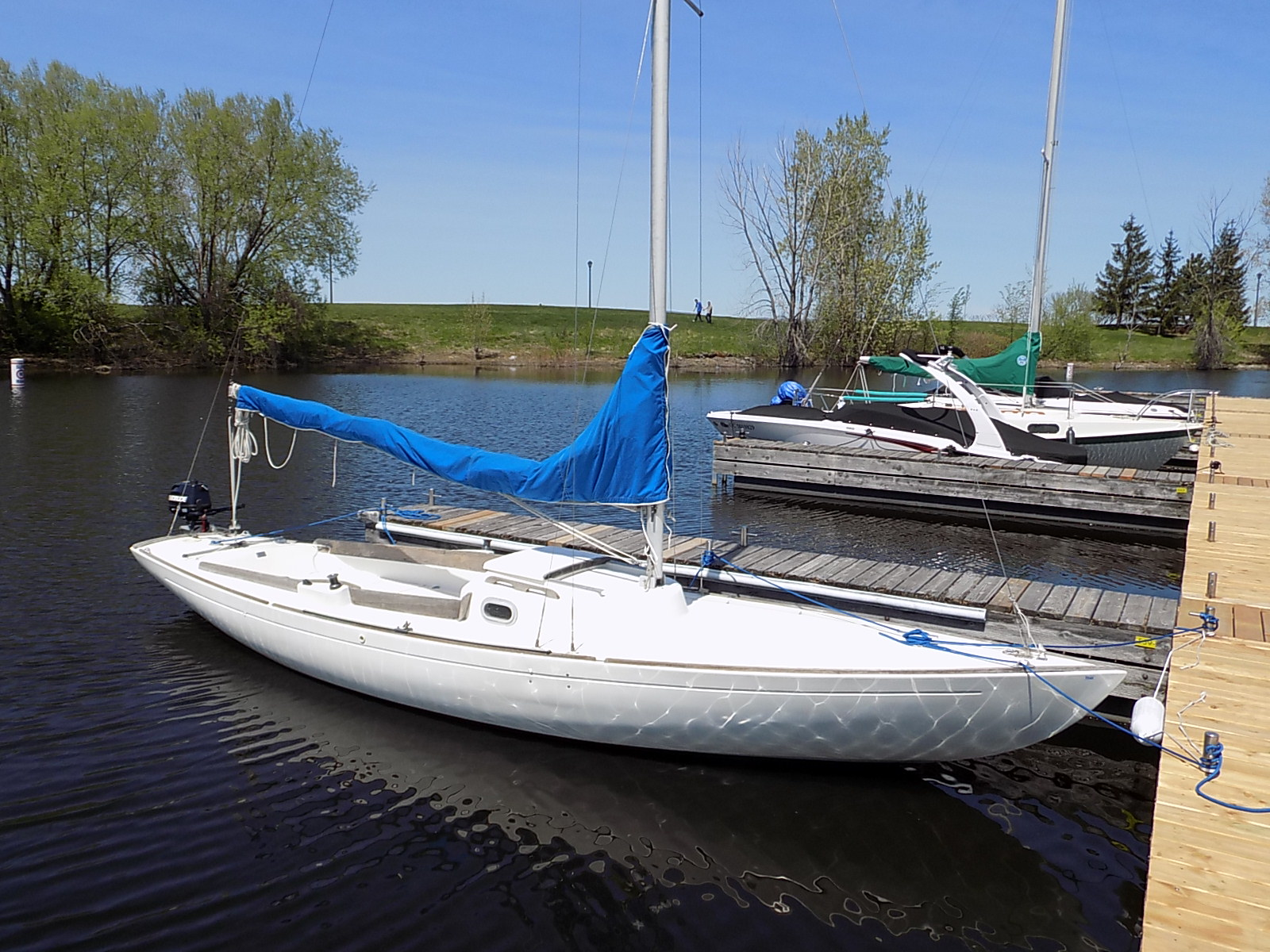
A fibreglass Bluenose with cuddy-cabin

The Bluenose is a small recreational keelboat, with early versions built from wood and later ones built predominantly of fiberglass, with wood trim. The wooden boats are open-topped, while the fibreglass versions have a small cuddy-cabin aft of the mast. The design features a fractional sloop rig, a raked stem, a raised transom, a keel-mounted rudder on a fixed long keel. Some were also built with a centreboard in place of the long keel. It displaces 2,050 lb (930 kg) and carries 800 lb (363 kg) of ballast.

The boat has a draft of 3.67 ft (1.12 m) with the standard long keel fitted.

The boat may be fitted with a small outboard motor for docking and maneuvering.

== Production ==
Roué produced a design, at the request of a group from the Armdale Yacht Club in Halifax, for a small one-design sloop that would be both fast and elegant and could be sailed easily by two or three people. The schooner Bluenose was still afloat, but had been sold to the West Indian Trading Company for use as a freighter. The new class was given the name Bluenose to help perpetuate the memory of the great champion. The first Bluenose class sloops were launched in the spring of 1946, just months after Bluenose was lost on a Haitian reef.

The first twelve boats were constructed at the same time together by their first owners under the direction of master boatbuilder John H. Barkhouse, of Barkhouse Boatyard in Chester, Nova Scotia. Many of these original twelve boats are still actively sailed or even raced. B1 was allowed to fall into a state of disrepair, but has since been restored and is on display at the Maritime Museum of the Atlantic.

These first boats were carvel-built of pine planking on oak frames. Production was brisk in the early years, with as many as fifty boats built by 1949. Other local builders in Nova Scotia also built the design, with 77 wooden versions eventually completed.

=== McVay production ===
In 1960 Roué granted rights to produce the design in fibreglass to McVay Fiberglass Yachts of Mahone Bay, Nova Scotia, which built them until 1972. George William McVay had founded his company after he left Paceship Yachts. Herring Cove Marine of Herring Cove, Nova Scotia was producing the boat in 2010, but seems to have gone out of business by 2018. A total of 180 examples were completed by the time production ended.

=== Snyder's production ===
As of 2018, Snyder's Shipyard in Dayspring, Nova Scotia is the only boatbuilder licensed to build Bluenose class sloops from W.J. Roue's design. At least one Bluenose class sloop was constructed of wood by Snyder's Shipyard in 2007.

== Operational history ==
The two original builders eventually produced 77 wooden boats between them. Some of the boats migrated throughout the Maritime Provinces, to Ontario and to the New England states, but the core of the fleet remains in Nova Scotia, centred mainly in Halifax but with fleets raced in Chester and Lunenburg.

=== Bluenose Class Racing ===
Although the fleet is now more than 70 years old, many of the boats are in very good condition. It is not uncommon that twenty or more yachts from the Halifax and Chester areas compete in a single event. Individual clubs also run smaller one-design races and handicap racing in club fleets is popular, as the size of the fleet makes it possible to establish a reasonable handicap without unduly penalizing the best skippers and crews.

The Chester Bluenose fleet is the largest one-design keelboat fleet in Atlantic Canada and has an active racing schedule from June through September. In July and August there are races on Tuesday and Thursday evenings and Sunday afternoons. Some fleet members also join the PHRF races on Saturday afternoons.

In addition to these regularly scheduled races, there is a distance race (the "Extreme Race"), the Bluenose Maritime Championships and Chester Race Week. In June and September the fleet has races on Thursday evenings and Saturday afternoons.

==== The Maritime Bluenose Championships ====
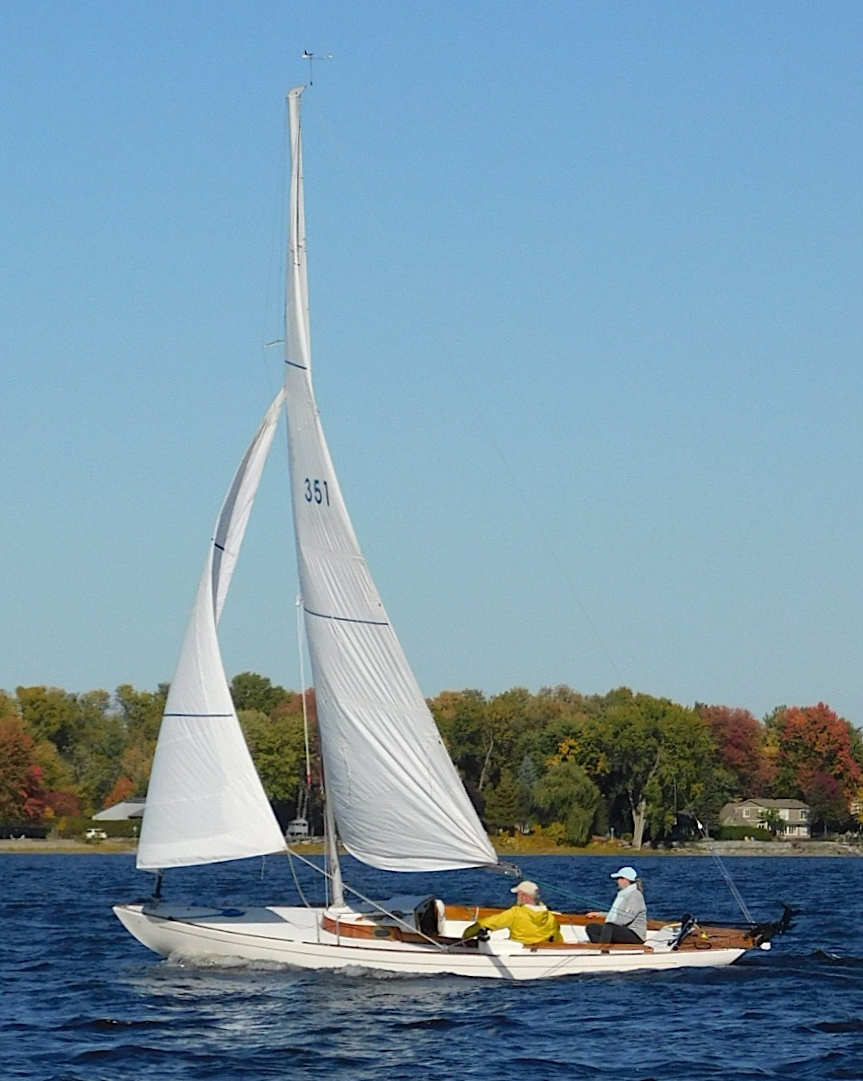
Bluenose one-design sloop

In August 1949, the Halifax Herald donated the International Bluenose Class Championship Trophy, as it had done for the International Fishermen's Trophy twenty-eight years earlier. The winner that year was a crew from Marblehead, Massachusetts.

A championship competition, open to all Bluenose sloops, is still held every year. However, the international format was abandoned after several boats swamped and sank during a particularly stormy weekend of racing. The Maritime Bluenose Championships are now contested by boats from the local fleets and are held in Halifax and Chester in alternating years.

The format of the contest has changed only slightly over the years. It is held during the last weekend of August and, since 1986, has alternated location between Halifax and Chester. Five races are sailed, ideally with three on Saturday and two on Sunday. Occasionally, conditions are such that three races can not be completed on Saturday, in which case at most three are sailed on Sunday. If fewer than three races are completed in total, the trophy is not awarded. The course is an Olympic triangle or, in more recent years, a windward-leeward configuration race, with legs ranging from 1/2 – 2 miles in length, depending on the wind and sea conditions. The winner is determined using the Olympic scoring system. Each yacht must comply with class specification rules and carry a crew of exactly three (not two, and certainly not four).

== Original 12 ==
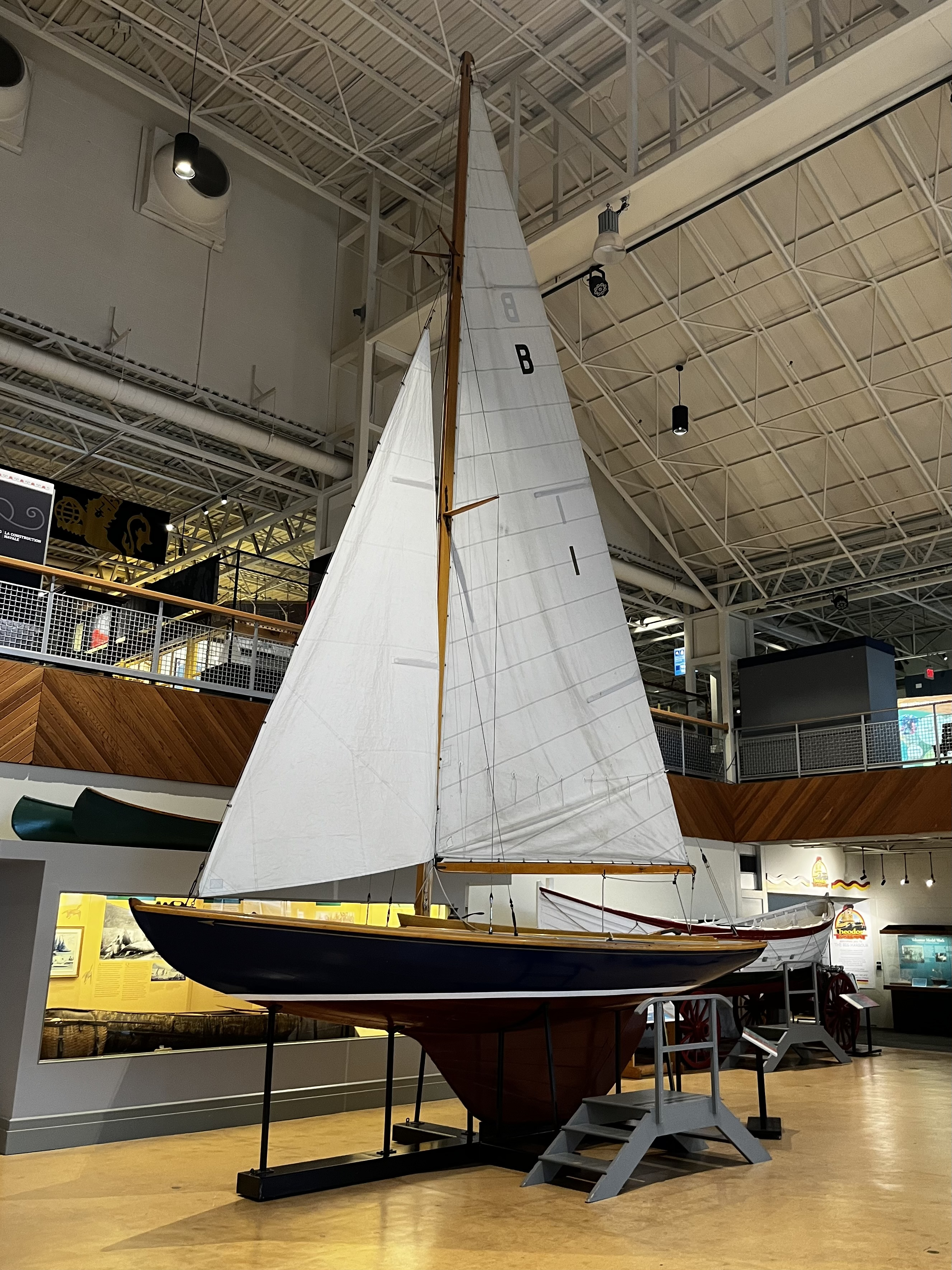
Bluenose one-design sloop #1, Maritime Museum of the Atlantic, Nova Scotia, Canada

The original names of the first twelve boats built, and the builders/owners of the first twelve (as recorded in the archives of the Maritime Museum of the Atlantic).

Sail Number	Original Name	Original Owner
B1	Gilpie	N. Gilpin
B2	Stormy Weather	P. Beaner
B3	Betty Lou	A. Levy
B4	Rowdy	A. Gilford
B5	Spindrift	S. (or G.) Doane
B6	Shady Lady	W. Oxner
B7	Bluenose	G. Dauphinee
B8	Penguin	D. Currie
B9	Glen Ho	D. Hopgood
B10	Pixie	D. Cooley
B11	Nemesis	C. Wallace
B12	Jolly Moron	E. Murphy

== See also ==
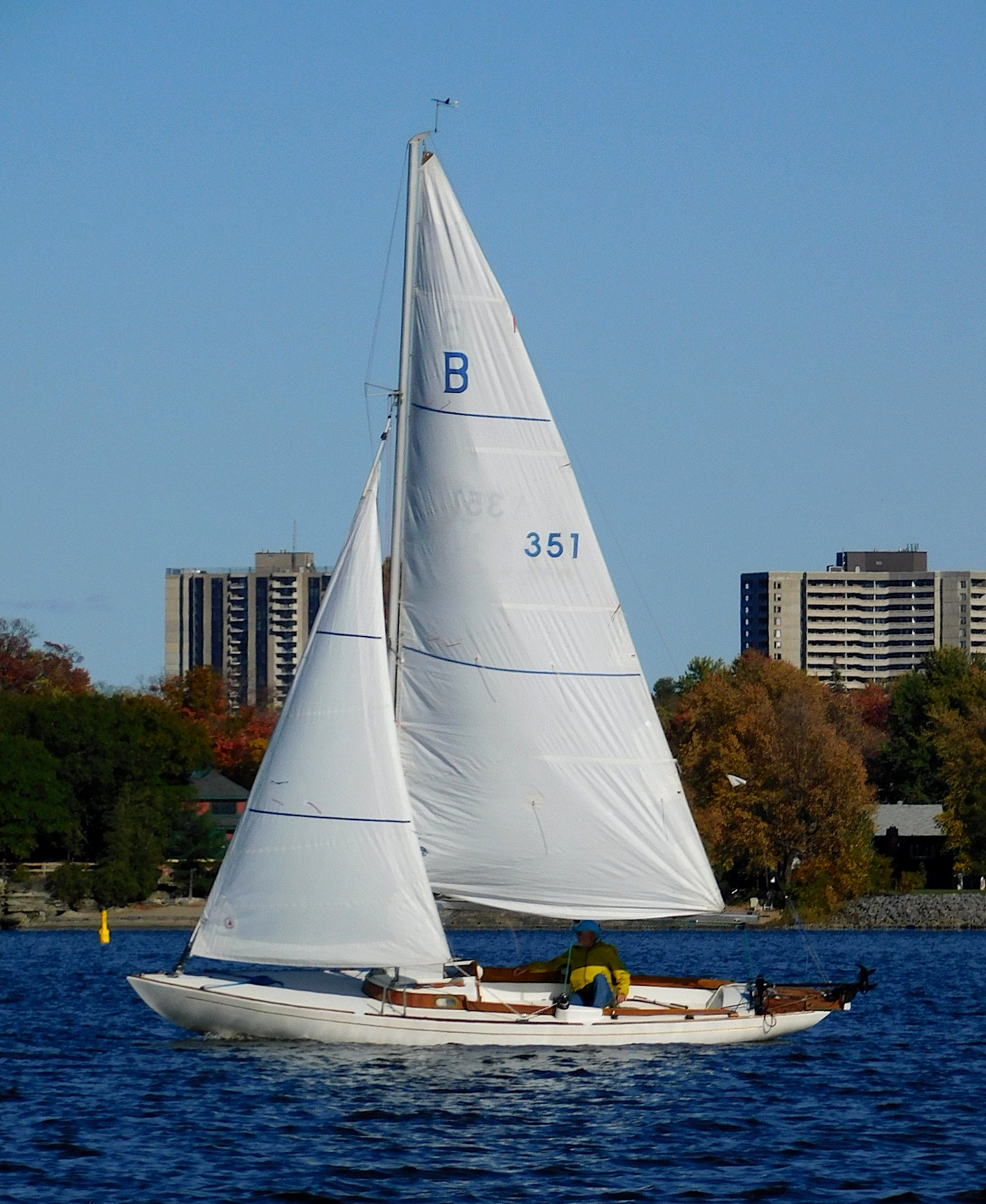
Bluenose one-design sloop

- List of sailing boat types

Related development

- Bluenose
- Roue 20
