= List of Theodore Tugboat episodes =

This is a list of episodes of the Canadian children's television series Theodore Tugboat. There are 130 episodes in the series (75 known to have aired in Canada). The series premiered on July 5, 1993 in Canada on CBC and the US on July 5, 1993 on PBS in 65 pairs.

== Series overview ==
Season	Episodes	Originally aired	
Season	Episodes	First aired	Last aired
1	20	July 5, 1993	July 30, 1993
2	20	December 7, 1994	February 1, 1995
3	25	June 7, 1996	March 7, 1997
4	30	September 12, 1998	April 16, 1999
5	35	June 4, 2000	October 12, 2001

== Episodes ==
=== Season 1 (1993) ===
No. overall	No. in season	Title	Original release date	Prod. code
1	1	"Theodore and the Oil Rig/Theodore and the Big Oil Rig"	July 5, 1993	120
An oil rig named Tex arrives and George boasts to Theodore that he knows all about oil rigs. To their surprise, Tex is arrogant and rude to the two tugs. When a storm hits, Tex's cables snap, and George is sent to stop him from running into Benjamin B. Bridge, but he gets caught and calls for Theodore, who ropes Tex, preventing a serious accident. The next morning Tex rightfully apologizes and becomes good friends with the tugs.
2	2	"Theodore and the Homesick Rowboat"	July 6, 1993	102
Theodore wants to do a job all by himself, and he finds this opportunity with R. Boat, a sad little rowboat whose dock was destroyed in a nighttime storm. Hank tags along to help, but Theodore resents his presence. After much searching, Theodore allows Hank to help, and the two find a nice little dock for R. Boat, knowing they can get the job done.
3	3	"The Dark and Scary Cove"	July 7, 1993	103
Theodore and Hank visit Cobequid Cove, an old cove outside the harbor. The two go inside and race around but discover scary sights and sounds, along with a creepy old wreck. The two are startled and run away, with Hank losing his lifeboat. The next morning, Hank is confined to the dock until his lifeboat is discovered. A brave but scared Theodore heads to the cove and discovers the lifeboat, and Pearl, the Pilot Boat, shows him the cove's sights and sounds are animals and branches in the water. Theodore thanks Pearl for showing him that the cove isn't as scary as they thought.
4	4	"Foduck the Vigilant"	July 8, 1993	104
Foduck is about to receive his V-word but can't think of anything special about himself. The tugs unsuccessfully try to cheer him up. Later, George collects some crates and brags. Foduck notices sparks coming from George's stack, but George ignores his warnings. Later that night, George's sparks set fire to the crates and his lifeboat. The tugs are scared, but a quick-thinking Foduck uses his firefighting equipment to put the fire out. The next morning, George apologizes, and Foduck gets a V-word, the Vigilant.
5	5	"Different Strokes – Different Boats"	July 9, 1993	105
The Dispatcher gives Theodore the task of teaching Hank how to pull barges. Theodore is delighted and hopes to make a good impression as a teacher. When they arrive at Barrington's dock, Hank pulls him from the side, which Theodore thinks is wrong because he always pulled barges from the front, so Theodore tells Hank he has to pull HIS way. When Hank tries Theodore's way, he does a bad job. Theodore learns that some tugs have different ways of doing things.
6	6	"Hank and the Mermaid"	July 12, 1993	106
Bonavista Barge is in charge of raising an old sunken ship. Hank sees what looks like a mermaid when he goes by the sandy beach! He tells the other tugs, but it's gone when they go to see for themselves. Hank is upset that the others don't believe him. Later, when he checks on Bonavista, she's looking for a piece called the "figurehead." It's part of old ships that look like people. When Hank realizes this is what he saw, they raise it, and the tugs are surprised to see it up on Hank's bow.
7	7	"True Blue Friends"	July 13, 1993	107
George is told he needs a hull check-up at the drydock. He's afraid it will hurt and decides to hide behind a big junk barge. Theodore finds him and promises he won't tell the others George's secret. The next day, Theodore, Foduck, and Emily are assigned to take the old wreck and push it to the junk dock where George is hiding. Theodore wants to keep George's secret but doesn't want him to get hurt. He shouts that George is hiding behind the barge and saves him. George faces his fears and goes to his hull check-up, realizing that check-ups are meant to help, not hurt.
8	8	"Bumper Buddies"	July 14, 1993	108
Theodore and Foduck have a little game where they race to Bedford Buoy, but when they finish, Foduck bumps Theodore, and it hurts. Theodore thinks this is unfriendly and avoids Foduck altogether while doing his work, which causes many mistakes. Later, Theodore decides to hide under Owan, the Oil Rig. Foduck apologizes, and the next day they're silent until they see Bedford. Theodore knows all is not right, so they race without bumping.
9	9	"Theodore and the Welcome"	July 15, 1993	109
Theodore is given the job of welcoming ships, a job which the four other tugs are very talented at, giving that welcoming feeling to any ship wanting to rest in the Big Harbor. Theodore tries to welcome a submarine that doesn't reply and becomes distressed until the submarine finally speaks, stating Theodore just woke him up. The submarine, Northumberland, is a sleepy sub. Theodore smiles and realizes he's good at what he puts his mind to.
10	10	"Theodore's First Pull/Theodore Buttons On"	July 16, 1993	110
Theodore wants to earn his 'V-Word', and Emily tries to help Theodore by teaching him some skills he'll need. Theodore soon grows overconfident.
11	11	"The Day Ice Came to the Harbor"	July 19, 1993	111
A big freeze slows down the productivity of the harbor. The pilot boats are restricted to their docks, so the tugboats are left to keep the harbor safe.
12	12	"Theodore's Bad Dreams"	July 20, 1993	112
One night, Theodore has a nightmare about a sea monster, and when he wakes up, he's scared the dream will come true. With a little help from his friends, Theodore discovers dreams are 'just pretend,' and he will be alright.
13	13	"Theodore the Vegetable"	July 21, 1993	113
A container ship named Julia, loaded vegetables, arrives early. Hank decides he and Theodore can bring her in alone, but Theodore and Julia are doubtful. Later, Theodore prevents a terrible accident when a mysterious grain ship cuts off Julia. When all the tugs return to the Great Ocean Dock, Emily tells Theodore that if he got his "V-Word", he would be "Theodore the Vegetable."
14	14	"Theodore and the Queen"	July 22, 1993	114
A grand ocean liner named the Queen Stephanie visits the harbor. When she tries to pass beneath Benjamin Bridge, she gets severely stuck. Theodore, however, quickly comes up with an idea to free her.
15	15	"Theodore and the Bluenose"	July 23, 1993	115
Bluenose, an old sailing ship, saves Foduck when his propeller becomes clogged with seaweed.
16	16	"Is Anybody Listening?"	July 26, 1993	116
Theodore thinks the pilot boats who patrol the harbor never listen to anybody, and they don't. But after much confusion and a near crash, the pilot boats learn a valuable lesson about not listening.
17	17	"George Buzzes the Dock"	July 27, 1993	117
The tugs notice Sandy Beach is polluted and argue over which ones are causing the pollution. Theodore reminds them all the tugs cause pollution. Later, they agree on a great idea of holding a 'Big Harbor Cleanup Contest.'
18	18	"The Big Harbor Cleanup Contest"	July 28, 1993	118
All the tugs have very big plans regarding what part of the harbor they will each clean up in the contest. After listening to each tug's big plans, Theodore can't think of one and has to settle for a 'little plan' instead. He's later surprised when HE wins!
19	19	"Best Friends"	July 29, 1993	119
Theodore tells each of the tugs they are his best friend. They get angry when they find out he has said the same thing to them and demand to know which one is truly his best friend. Hank becomes upset with this and gets stuck on a sandspit. When the other tugs pull him off, they all become best friends.
20	20	"Theodore and the Big Harbor"	July 30, 1993	101
It's Theodore's first day in the Big Harbor, and he's astonished at how different compared to where he used to work. He's never seen ferry boats, meets Benjamin B. Bridge, has to share a dock, and he has never heard of an ocean tug. It takes a few lessons for him to catch on.

=== Season 2 (1994–1995) ===
No. overall	No. in season	Title	Original release date	Prod. code
21	1	"Theodore's Whistle"	December 7, 1994	201
When Katherine calls Theodore's whistle "cute," Theodore wears it out by trying to make it sound different. Later, when Queen Stephanie visits the harbor, Theodore can't work because of his broken whistle. The Queen reminds him of just how special his whistle is.
22	2	"George's Ghost"	December 9, 1994	202
Theodore says he's seen a ghost at Shipwreck Rock that makes a strange "ding ding" sound and looks like it's floating in the air. George doesn't believe Theodore until he sees it himself. At first, he's scared, but it turns out Digby the Cable Ship is stuck on some rocks. Theodore, George, and Bobby help Digby into the water, and George admits to the other tugs he isn't always right.
23	3	"Theodore Changes Sides"	December 11, 1994	203
George says Theodore can sleep with the ocean tugs on the other side of the dock while Emily is away. Theodore agrees because sleeping on the ocean tug's side of the dock makes him feel more important. However, Hank is left alone on the other side of the dock and feels sad and lonely.
24	4	"Night Shift"	December 13, 1994	204
Theodore and Hank volunteers to do the night shift because the other tugs don't want to. When it's time, Theodore and Hank have difficulty finding Owan the Oil Rig. Once they move him across the harbor, they try to figure out what is in the water making big waves. They soon find out that it's Northumberland Submarine.
25	5	"A Whale of a Tug"	December 15, 1994	205
Theodore finds a whale (a pilot whale) who is trapped in some logs. He names the whale "Walter" and takes care of him until George can find his parents. When he does, Theodore has a hard time saying goodbye to Walter but learns Walter is better off in his natural habitat.
26	6	"The Tugboat Pledge"	December 17, 1994	206
The Dispatcher has assigned Emily to lead the others in the tugboat parade. Hank suggests she should recite "The Tugboat Pledge" as well, except there is no such thing. The tugs decide to create one, and Emily is nominated to do so since she always does a good job at everything. Emily has a hard time with this until her friends help her out.
27	7	"Emergency"	December 19, 1994	207
Foduck decides to teach the other tugs about safety flags. George doesn't find the lesson important until he finds a ship whose radio is damaged. Little does he know that he could be putting himself in serious danger.
28	8	"The Cold Snap"	December 21, 1994	208
The Dispatcher can't hear properly due to a bad cold. Unfortunately, this leads to confusion because he's not entirely sure what everyone is saying. Theodore gets restricted to his dock for a misunderstanding, but later, he leaves to help the other tugs. He fears what the Dispatcher will say, but he learns even the Dispatcher makes mistakes.
29	9	"Hank and the Hug"	December 23, 1994	209
No one wants to play with Hank or even let him help. He initially feels angry but later begins feeling depressed. The other tugs soon join together to formulate a plan to apologize to Hank and make him feel better.
30	10	"Emily and the Rocket"	December 24, 1994	210
Theodore and Emily see a large light traveling across the sky one night. The next day, Emily is asked to help Constance the Coast Guard Ship with something important, though Constance isn't the friendliest ship. Emily soon discovers the large light was a fallen rocket from space. She makes friends with Constance when she stands up to her, and the two get along very well.
31	11	"Foduck Stays Home"	December 27, 1994	211
It's decided that Foduck is the Big Harbor's official safety tug. He's disappointed that he won't be able to go out on the open ocean. He feels happier after helping Theodore and Hank find their way back to the harbor in a thick fog.
32	12	"Theodore, the Tug in Charge"	December 30, 1994	212
Theodore is the tug in charge of the day. When he runs into a spot of bother with Northumberland, he doubts his ability to bring in the real ship. His friends support him, and he winds up bringing the ship in alone.
33	13	"Theodore in the Middle"	January 1, 1995	213
Theodore is in the middle of an argument between Emily and George when George decides to report an official complaint about Emily for being late. They eventually make up without Emily getting a red mark in the Great Tugboat Book and without Theodore losing a friend.
34	14	"Carla, the Cool Cabin Cruiser"	January 9, 1995	214
Emily's new friend Carla encourages her to do dangerous things in the Big Harbor. When Emily refuses, Carla says she's boring. Later, when Carla is frightened by a storm, Theodore and Emily save her and change her mind about tugboats.
35	15	"Snorri, the Viking Ship"	January 13, 1995	214
An unusual ship named Snorri arrives in the Big Harbor. He seems rather rude at first, but Theodore soon finds out he's just different.
36	16	"Tug of the Year"	January 16, 1995	216
George is sad he didn't win the 'Tugboat of the Year' contest, even though he practiced hard. His friends give him his award for being such a good friend.
37	17	"Theodore, the Jokester"	January 19, 1995	217
Everyone laughs when Theodore, distracted by the stinky seaweed on Rebecca's deck, accidentally says her smell doesn't work instead of her bell. This makes Benjamin and the Ferry Twins laugh. Theodore likes this, so he purposely tries to tell a joke. He can't figure out why nobody laughs until he's the butt of everyone's jokes. He feels bad until he apologizes to Rebecca.
38	18	"Emily the Vigorous"	January 23, 1995	218
Emily has a full day of work but wants to meet a fishing trawler named Gregor, who has come from Russia. She attempts to rush all her jobs but is too hasty for her own good. Later, she finds a way so she can meet Gregor and work at the same time.
39	19	"Theodore's Day Off"	January 27, 1995	219
Theodore asks the Dispatcher for some time off, which is agreed upon, but he soon becomes very, very bored. The Dispatcher won't even let him talk to Donald Dock! He misses pulling Barrington Barge with his big pipes. The next day, Theodore tells the Dispatcher that he wants to work and has a great day.
40	20	"Foduck and the Rainbow"	February 1, 1995	220
A string of sudden changes to Foduck's routine deeply upset him because he liked how his original routine was.

=== Season 3 (1996–1997) ===
No. overall	No. in season	Title	Original release date	Prod. code
41	1	"All Quiet in the Big Harbor"	June 7, 1996	301
After a loud morning of tug of war, the Dispatcher demands the tugs to be quiet. They take this too seriously and begin to act silent all the time. Hank's laughter forces George to send him home. A heavy fog has rolled in, and Hank is concerned with the loud sound coming from Willy's Island, which is Lilly's foghorn. After Hank stops the horn, Theodore and George arrive with Owan, but with no horn, they are in danger of hitting the island. Hank saves the day and prevents an incident, but they worry about an angry Dispatcher, but he's proud of Hank.
42	2	"Theodore to the Rescue"	June 11, 1996	302
After Emily rescues Jennifer from an incident at sea, Theodore can't wait for the day he will finally go out on a rescue mission. The next day, a storm is brewing, and Digby needs rescue in a cove outside the harbor. The Dispatcher assigns Theodore to bring Digby home. Forgetting his extra strength tow rope, Theodore struggles but manages to improvise and save Digby from sinking. Back home, Theodore tells Emily he should have listened, and as he tows Digby to the repair yard, he wonders when he will go out farther.
43	3	"A Joke Too Far"	June 15, 1996	303
Theodore and Barrington Barge decide to play hide and surprise like they always do with Petra the Pilot Boat. But staying hidden too long causes everyone in the harbor to become worried. Theodore learns jokes are funny, but not when they cause everyone to worry.
44	4	"Theodore and the Ice Ship"	July 18, 1996	304
Theodore, George, and Hank find an enormous ice sculpture floating in the water but can't identify the ship inside. When the ice melts, it turns out to be Shamus, a fishing trawler, and the tugs discover how wonderful the ice ship was on the inside when he was good for nothing on the outside.
45	5	"Big Harbor Fools' Day"	July 21, 1996	305
It's Big Harbor Fools' Day, but George doesn't take a liking to any of the jokes. The tugs are soon able to change his mind with some bubble bath.
46	6	"Grumpy Garbage Barge"	August 26, 1996	306
Guysborough the Garbage Barge turns Theodore's bright and cheerful mood into a grumpy and sour one. This spreads across the whole harbor until everyone is grumpy. But when Theodore tries to be happy again, everyone is happy, even Guysborough.
47	7	"Theodore Hugs the Coast"	August 29, 1996	307
The Dispatcher sends Theodore on a job where he must hug the coast. Unfortunately, he becomes distracted and disobeys orders. He meets many new friends on the way.
48	8	"Hank's Hiccups"	September 4, 1996	308
Hank has a severe case of hiccups that interfere with his work and spends the whole day trying different methods to get rid of them. What eventually cures Hank's hiccups is when he forgets about them long enough to help a ship in danger.
49	9	"Hank's New Name"	September 6, 1996	309
A large ocean barge named Shelburne is brought to the Big Harbor, and the tugboats are amazed at his name. This results in Hank changing his name to Henry, and from this comes many name changes, minus Theodore who likes his name. After a confused Dispatcher gives out his job orders, George, Emily, and Hank go to move Barrington, leaving only Theodore to move Shelburne, which results in a runaway barge. Hank saves Shelburne and realizes he likes his name.
50	10	"Theodore and the Northern Lights"	October 9, 1996	310
The tugs visit Kulu, a storytelling canoe. Kulu tells the tugs the story of the northern lights. The tugs love the story, but Foduck sees all of Kulu's stories as nonsense. During a large storm, Theodore asks Foduck to visit Kulu with him. They find the canoe missing and a paddle that points to Shipwreck Rock, where they see the northern lights.
51	11	"Theodore's Birthday Surprise/Big Harbor Birthday"	October 19, 1996	311
It's Theodore's birthday, but he thinks everyone has forgotten all about it. This causes him to feel miserable, but to his surprise, everyone throws him a big birthday party.
52	12	"Theodore's Backwards Day"	November 14, 1996	312
Theodore's engine breaks down so that he can only move backward. This causes Theodore to feel so embarrassed that he hides from the tugs until he gets his engine fixed.
53	13	"Scally's Stuff"	November 29, 1996	313
A ship named Scally comes to the harbor full of different treasures that he gives to the tugs. Theodore gets a wind-spinner, Hank a really big, bumper, Emily a smokestack extension, and Foduck a siren. After confusing the harbor, they restore order when they return their treasures to Scally.
54	14	"Theodore's Big New Friend"	December 6, 1996	314
When Theodore is in charge of the arrival of Cumberland the Container Ship, things go awry. Cumberland's special engines do not require tugs for steering, so he ignores Theodore and docks in the middle of the harbor. As Theodore spends the night preventing collisions, he learns the big ship only misses his friend. So he and Theodore become good friends, and the ship learns everyone needs tugboats.
55	15	"Theodore and the Missing Barge"	December 19, 1996	315
It's New Bumper Day in the Big Harbor. All the tugs are anxious to get their new bumpers, while Carla, the Cabin Cruiser, is anxious to explore. When no one goes with her, she takes everything in the harbor, like oil barrels, bumpers, and barges. Everyone thinks Emily took everything until Carla courageously tells the tugs what she did.
56	16	"Theodore and the Borrowed Bell"	January 10, 1997	316
Northumberland reluctantly lends Theodore his bell, but despite Theodore's promise to look after it, the bell is accidentally knocked overboard by Hank. Theodore tries to recover it before Northumberland finds out, but when George is blamed for the loss, Theodore tells the truth. Northumberland easily retrieves the bell, and Theodore learns he should have told the truth from the start.
57	17	"Emily's Close Call"	January 17, 1997	317
Hank and Theodore find fun things washed up on shore after a storm, and Emily wants to find something fun too. She comes across a strange-looking container but can't figure out what it is. Foduck says the container had fallen off Cumberland during the storm and was dangerous. He intercepts Emily, who has accidentally dropped the leaking container into the water. Luckily, Northumberland Submarine can safely remove it. Emily learns to be more careful about what she picks up.
58	18	"Emily's New Hat"	January 22, 1997	318
The Dispatcher sends Emily to replace her old hat with a new one, but Emily doesn't want a new hat, and the new one makes her look silly. Theodore explains to the Dispatcher that everyone has a favorite thing to hold on to, so the Dispatcher lets Emily get her old hat back.
59	19	"Emily and the Tug of War"	January 29, 1997	319
George excludes Emily from 'tug of war' because she's a girl tug, which starts a conflict between the two. Catherine, the Container Ship, later arrives with a double load that tilts her to one side while Theodore and George are towing her to her dock. They find themselves on a collision course with Owan, the Oil Rig. After hearing George call for help, Emily rushes to stop the ship just in time. George realizes it doesn't matter whether you're a boy tug or a girl tug, and they all play tug of war.
60	20	"Theodore and the Lost Bell Buoy"	February 5, 1997	320
Foduck tells Theodore he shouldn't spin Bedford. Theodore doesn't listen, and all of the spinning breaks Bedford's anchor cable, causing him to float away. Later, Theodore finds Bedford trapped behind a pile of driftwood and learns he shouldn't play with things that must be taken seriously.
61	21	"Theodore and the Bully"	February 13, 1997	321
A new tug comes to the harbor to work for a while. His name is Oliver the Vast. After running into him a few times, Theodore is certain that Oliver is a bully and doesn't want to be Theodore's friend. He finally tells the Dispatcher about Oliver, and the next day, Oliver gets sent back across the ocean.
62	22	"George and the Underwater Mystery"	February 22, 1997	322
Foduck's sonar detects something at the bottom of the harbor. He asks Theodore and George to help him find out what it is, but George is being too bossy, making Theodore angry with his orders. Finally, George listens to Theodore's plan to use Shelburne and Northumberland to help but then starts to shout at them, and nothing goes right. When they all work together, they raise a fallen satellite.
63	23	"R. Boat and the Queen"	February 28, 1997	323
The harbor is being dredged to make it deep enough for a visit from Queen Stephanie. Theodore is assigned to move R. Boat out of the way. R. Boat is grumpy because no one bigger than him ever wants to be his friend, and everyone is bigger than him. R. Boat begins to change his opinion when the Queen wants to meet the boat that gave up his dock for her.
64	24	"Hank and the Night Light"	March 1, 1997	324
When Theodore goes to the repair dock for a few days to get his regular tune-up, Hank misses him very much each night and becomes afraid of the dark. The other tugs try everything to eliminate Hank's fear, but nothing helps – not even a night light. When Theodore returns, Hank is surprised to learn Theodore was once afraid of the dark, too. In the end, Hank overcomes his fear of the dark and realizes that sometimes you have to grow out of your fears as he falls fast asleep next to Theodore.
65	25	"Theodore and the Pirate"	March 7, 1997	325
The tugboats are pulling ships, and Pearl is very busy and can't keep track of everything. Theodore tells Benjamin Bridge a new pilot boat is arriving, but the bridge misunderstands. He thinks Theodore said a pirate ship was hiding. When Theodore brings the new pilot boat, Petra, to meet his friends, everyone is out hunting for Benjamin's pirate. Theodore finally clears things up.

=== Season 4 (1998–1999) ===
No. overall	No. in season	Title	Original release date	Prod. code
66	1	"Foduck's Hurt Feelings"	September 12, 1998	401
Foduck accidentally sprays the Dispatcher with his fire hose while playing with Theodore. For the first time, the Dispatcher yells at Foduck. He's greatly saddened and fears he has lost the respect of the Dispatcher. Later, Foduck yells at Theodore when he asks him to spray him with his fire hose again. Surprisingly, Theodore is not upset and explains he knew Foduck was having a bad day and perhaps the Dispatcher was having a bad day too. When Foduck returns to the dock, the Dispatcher reassures him they will always be friends.
67	2	"Theodore's Tough Tugging"	September 18, 1998	402
Theodore and George have the job of bringing in a ship called Caraquet, loaded with fragile cargo. While Theodore tries to keep her steady, George makes noise and goes faster. When it's time to take Caraquet out of the Harbor, Theodore realizes the only way to get Caraquet out of the Harbor safely is to ask George to slow down.
68	3	"Theodore's Ocean Adventure"	September 24, 1998	403
Theodore isn't sure he's ready to go out on the ocean, but when his friend Rebecca, the Research Vessel, doesn't return to the Harbor on time, he knows he has to venture out. He uses a recent lesson on currents to find her and cleverly saves her from an iceberg by using chunks of ice to make himself heavier. As they head home, Theodore realizes he knows more than he thought. He smiles as he uses the stars to navigate, as Rebecca had shown him before.
69	4	"Theodore's New Job"	October 2, 1998	404
Theodore gets the new job of inspecting bell buoys but soon begins acting too bossy. When he finally nicely asks the bell buoys to do what he wants, things get much easier for him.
70	5	"Digby's Disaster"	October 8, 1998	405
Digby and all the other tugboats get very excited when they meet Dartmouth, the Giant Cable Ship. They soon forget about Digby when comparing him to the big ship. Digby notices one of Dartmouth's cables slipping into the water. After saving the cable, the tugs realize Digby is just as important as any other ship.
71	6	"Dartmouth Says Goodbye"	October 13, 1998	406
Dartmouth the Giant Cable Ship is ready to leave the Harbor after laying the rest of his cables. Theodore, however, doesn't want Dartmouth to leave and has trouble saying goodbye to him.
72	7	"George and the Funny Noise"	October 22, 1998	407
George makes a weird sound in the presence of Theodore, Hank, and a ship. He feels embarrassed, so he goes to live under Owan. Theodore shows him that it's okay to do something silly once in a while and to laugh along with your friends.
73	8	"Rebecca's Treasure"	October 28, 1998	408
Theodore is sure his assignment to work with Rebecca, The Research Vessel, will be boring. He isn't sure what Rebecca does, but he does know he'd rather be with the other tugs bringing in a big ship. But Theodore gets excited when Rebecca locates something at the bottom of the Harbor. When it turns out to be an old pirate ship anchor, Theodore realizes Rebecca was right when she said that sometimes 'you just have to look a little deeper.' And he knows she means more than just looking underwater.
74	9	"Guysborough's Garbage"	November 3, 1998	409
Canso Colossus, the king of all supertankers, is visiting the Harbor. While the tugs are paying attention to him, they forget how important Guysborough is. When Guysborough refuses to work, the Harbor becomes a mess. When Canso sees the garbage floating in the water, he demands to be taken out of the Harbor. The tugs finally learn how much the Harbor needs Guysborough.
75	10	"Theodore Visits Ceilidh's Cove"	November 11, 1998	410
Theodore is sent to deliver a new propeller to a fishing trawler in Ceilidh's Cove. After finding the cove himself and giving Dorothy the Dory a ride out on the ocean, he finally learns how being bigger feels.
76	11	"George's Turn"	November 20, 1998	411
The tugs meet Sigrid, the new supply ship. While working with Sigrid, George becomes jealous and doesn't want to make friends with her. When George sees he and Sigrid have a lot in common, he changes his opinion, and they all become best friends.
77	12	"Theodore Lands on Earth"	November 25, 1998	412
Most of the tugs are enjoying how the storm's waves make them bounce, but not Theodore. The waves are making him dizzy, and he can't sleep. He wonders what living on nice, stable land would be like. He gets his chance when he has to go into the dry dock for a repair. At first, he's excited. He even gets to chat with a building named Shediac! But when he realizes he can't move, living on land is much less appealing. It's boring. Theodore can't wait to return to his wavy, wet dock.
78	13	"Hank Makes a Friend"	December 4, 1998	413
Hank wants to be like Theodore and make friends with everyone in the Harbor, but he can't figure out how to do it. He tries to show Rebecca, the Research Vessel, how smart he is, but he looks silly. Then he tries to be funny, but Rebecca gets annoyed because he's interrupting her work. Theodore helps Hank see that being himself is the best way to make a friend.
79	14	"Foduck Blows his Stack"	December 9, 1998	414
Foduck is assigned to supervise Theodore's ocean-going tug test, but he wants to be doing something else. He gets frustrated when Theodore slowly and carefully takes Shelburne, the Sea Barge, to Ceilidh's Cove. When Theodore doesn't follow his requests to speed up, Foduck loses his temper and shoves Shelburne into a dock. Everyone is shocked, including Foduck. The safety tug apologizes and tells Theodore to take his time. Able to work at his speed, Theodore passes his test.
80	15	"Sigrid and the Bumpers"	December 14, 1998	415
Sigrid, the Supply Ship, has always wanted to be a tugboat. She thinks she can finally be one if only she had bumpers. Later, when a bad storm prevents Theodore and Emily from docking a ship, Sigrid discovers she can be a tugboat without bumpers. The next day, she gets a nice green bumper from Shediac. Sigrid puts the bumper on the back of her wheelhouse to remember the time she was a tugboat.
81	16	"Hank's Wheezy Whistle"	December 25, 1998	416
Hank's whistle starts wheezing right before the Big Harbor Tugboat Races. When he neglects to get it fixed right away, it starts to get worse. In the end, Hank gets his whistle cleaned and starts the tugboat race.
82	17	"Theodore and the Haunted Houseboat"	December 31, 1998	417
While taking a new shortcut home, Theodore passes a boat that looks like a haunted house. The others, laughing, tell him he must have seen Haliburton Houseboat, and no one is afraid of him. Foduck helps Theodore meet the houseboat, and Theodore finds out Haliburton is not so scary. Haliburton is afraid of Bobby Barge, who looks like a headless ship. Theodore follows Foduck's example and introduces the houseboat to the barge.
83	18	"Northumberland is Missing"	January 8, 1999	418
Theodore and Rebecca spend the day searching for Northumberland, who gets trapped on the bottom of the ocean after an underwater rock-slide bends his propeller. With the help of Shelburne, Northumberland is soon raised back to the surface.
84	19	"Emily Goes Overboard"	January 21, 1999	419
Emily is known for doing great turns in the Big Harbor until she carelessly gets herself stuck between two big Pictou Peak rocks while trying to do a turn through them. Luckily, Digby, the Cable Ship, finds her and gets help from Theodore, who pushes Emily out.
85	20	"Emily and the Splash"	January 28, 1999	420
Sigrid shows Emily a new way to look for things on Sandy Beach. When Theodore comes along using the old way, Emily gets annoyed and yells at him. Theodore thinks Emily doesn't like him anymore. Sigrid reminds Emily that Theodore was doing what they usually did. Emily realizes she has hurt her friend's feelings. They all decide that the best thing to do is to continue hunting for things together, but each day, they use a different method.
86	21	"Rebecca and the Big Snore"	February 3, 1999	421
Benjamin Bridge keeps Rebecca up all night with loud snoring, making her grumpy when she goes treasure hunting with Theodore and Shelburne. When Rebecca upsets everyone, she and Theodore learn that nobody's perfect.
87	22	"Theodore Tells a Lie"	February 11, 1999	422
Theodore lies about nearly hitting one of the ferries to avoid getting in trouble. However, when he lies about inspecting a dock, it catches fire because he didn't clean it up. Foduck puts out the fire but gets in trouble instead. That's when Theodore decides to confess to the Dispatcher, who welcomes his honesty.
88	23	"Theodore's Bright Idea"	February 20, 1999	423
Theodore is moving Guysborough when the fog is so thick he can't even see. To find his way home, he listens for Lilly, the Lighthouse's foghorn, but she has lost her voice. Theodore realizes that Canso Colossus is in danger without Lilly, so he improvises. He knows Guysborough loves to complain, and every complaint starts with a loud, groaning 'Theodore' that sounds like a foghorn.
89	24	"George and the Navy Ship"	February 26, 1999	424
George and Theodore meet Nautilus, the Navy Ship. George wants to be a navy ship and ends up towing in Truro for dumping garbage in the ocean. But this "garbage" turns out to be Truro's fishing net. After realizing his mistake, George escorts Truro out of the Harbor and returns to being himself.
90	25	"Theodore's Prize"	March 10, 1999	425
The tugboats have a contest for whoever does the best job each day, and the winner gets a prized flag. Theodore gets the job of hauling Bedford, but it's harder than he thought. In the end, Theodore doesn't get a prize, but something he gives himself.
91	26	"The Dispatcher's Best Birthday"	March 19, 1999	426
The tugs want to get ready for The Dispatcher's birthday party, but rough seas are making their normal work take longer. Emily and George are supposed to get the balloons, but they free Clementine, who is stuck. Foduck, who is supposed to sing 'Happy Birthday,' uses up his whistle dealing with emergencies. Hank and Theodore are supposed to get a present, a tug-of-war rope, and party lights, but they use them to save Bayswater Barge's cargo. They are sure The Dispatcher will be disappointed that they can't throw him a party. Instead, The Dispatcher tells them what a wonderful job they did during the storm.
92	27	"Emily's Easy Job"	March 23, 1999	427
Theodore thinks Emily makes moving ships look so easy that he feels useless when he's assigned to help her. He thinks he'll never be as good as Emily, so why bother trying? But when Emily runs into rough water while towing Inverness, the cargo ship, Theodore prevents the ship from crashing into Owan, the Oil Rig. Theodore realizes that while he can't do everything Emily can, the things he can do are still important.
93	28	"Nautilus and the Sinking Ship"	March 31, 1999	428
Canso Colossus, the Super Tanker, hits a rock and sinks. George, Foduck, and Theodore are sure they can save him by themselves. When their first attempt fails, they blame each other. When this worsens, they learn the importance of asking for help. With help from Nautilus, the Navy Ship, the three save the tanker.
94	29	"Owan on the Loose"	April 8, 1999	429
Sigrid goes into the Harbor to fetch Owan some new anchor cables when she gets trapped under some junk. Owan gets too excited and tries to look for her, but his cables snap when he attempts to raise them. The tugs can stop him right before he runs into a cliff, then quickly move on to save Sigrid.
95	30	"Emily's Bruised Bumper"	April 16, 1999	430
Emily bruises her bumper while docking a big ship with Theodore and George, so she has to float around with a big red bandage. Emily fears everyone will laugh when they see how pathetic she thinks she looks. Theodore convinces her that she will always be Emily, no matter how she looks.

=== Season 5 (2000–2001) ===
No. overall	No. in season	Title	Original release date	Prod. code
96	1	"Theodore Shares His Story"	June 4, 2000	501
Theodore thinks his friends will be excited to hear about his adventures, so he's confused when Hank and Truro don't welcome his interruptions. That night, however, when George interrupts Theodore's tale of his trip to Ceilidh's Cove, Theodore realizes how he must have made Truro and Hank feel. He goes back to his friends, and instead of reporting his adventures, he asks to hear their stories. He quickly discovers it can be just as fun to listen as to talk.
97	2	"Hank Hurts a Ship"	June 11, 2000	502
Hank meets Bayswater Barge, who is passionate about calling him names. Hank takes a liking to it until he calls Inverness, a cargo ship, "Needlenose." Inverness is so insulted that he tries to leave the Harbor. Hank quickly learns his mistake after Theodore convinces Inverness to stay.
98	3	"Theodore and the Harbor Crane"	June 28, 2000	503
Theodore meets Clayton, the Harbor Crane, and decides he wants to lift heavy things like Clayton. Theodore spots a bumper when he and Emily take Clementine, the Container Ship, out of the Harbor the next day, which he mistakes for a can unexpected quick turn that sends one of Clementine's container's overboard, and Theodore hurts his engine trying to lift it. Clayton convinces Theodore he's much better at being a tugboat than a harbor crane.
99	4	"Theodore on Time"	July 17, 2000	504
Theodore is very excited that it is his week to welcome arriving ships to the Harbor, but he has forgotten to check his oil, so everyone has to wait while he goes to the oil dock. They are annoyed that the delay makes them miss their chance to swap stories with the news, C, Clementine. The same thing happens the next morning, but the other tugs don't win this time. Theodore feels especially bad when his friends return to the dock with stories of the things he missed. By the third day, Theodore had learned his lesson.
100	5	"George's Big Hurry"	July 25, 2000	505
George is in such a hurry, he forgets to pay attention to safety. His carelessness puts a ship named Clare and his friends in danger when the tugs get caught in an ice flow. Still, he continues to try to rush everybody. Finally, Theodore refuses to work. George is taken by surprise, but when Theodore explains his resistance, George realizes that sometimes the best way to speed things up is to slow down and be careful.
101	6	"Theodore and the Buoy Boat"	August 7, 2000	506
A new buoy boat named Baddeck is visiting the Harbor. When Theodore first sees him lifting Bedford and Blandford out of the water, he thinks the buoys prefer Baddeck over him. He soon changes his mind about Baddeck and learns the buoys like him just as much, and he and the bell buoys, along with Baddeck, become friends.
102	7	"Theodore Gets Lost"	August 14, 2000	507
Theodore is excited because he's assigned to bring Emma Sophia all by himself, but he loses his way in the fog, and no one can hear him call for help over Lunenburg Lighthouse's foghorn. Luckily he runs into Digby, whose cable gives him an idea. Digby can always tell where he's been simply by following the cable he has laid. Theodore decides he, too, can retrace his steps. The strategy works, and he ends up back where he started, and with help from Pearl, he starts over again.
103	8	"Hank's Funny Feeling"	September 3, 2000	508
Theodore has never met anyone who tells more outlandish tales than Malarkey. He's surprised that Hank believes the stories. Hank is flattered by Malarkey's attention, especially when the ship offers to teach him how to tow, just like the big tugs. The only catch is that they will have to practice secretly at Sandy Beach and that Hank can't tell anyone. Hank knows he should always tell The Dispatcher where he's going. With Theodore's encouragement, Hank trusts his instinct.
104	9	"Theodore and the Runaway Ferry"	September 18, 2000	509
Philmore, one of the ferry twins, is bored of going back and forth in the same lane every day. So Philmore decides to leave the Harbor. Phillip offers to look for his missing twin, but Theodore helps Phillip cope with the monotony by teaching the ferry how to play 'I Spy.' During the game, Benjamin Bridge spies Philmore. Theodore quickly catches up with the runaway ferry and lets him know how worried everyone is. Philmore agrees to return and try Theodore's game.
105	10	"Theodore and the Scared Ship"	October 10, 2000	510
Seabright, a new container ship, has stopped in the middle of the Harbor, blocking everything. Unknown to the tugs, the visitor has never been under the bridge and is afraid he will get stuck. They quickly lose their patience, whistling and shouting at the frightened ship. But Theodore encourages Seabright, empathizing and telling him to take his time. Seabright eventually goes under the bridge all by himself.
106	11	"Foduck in Reverse"	October 22, 2000	511
Foduck hasn't gone backward in a long time, but when he has to tow in reverse to dock Nautilus, the Navy Ship, he finds that it's so fun that he floats in reverse everywhere he goes. The change puts a smile on the face of the normally serious and responsible safety tug, but it also makes him careless. Because he can't see very well going backward, he almost runs over Dorothy Dory, who is saved by Theodore. The brush with danger makes Foduck realize it's okay to go backward, but not all the time.
107	12	"Hank and the Sunken Ship"	November 2, 2000	512
Northumberland discovers a sunken ship and tells the tugs all about it. Hank decides to try raising the ship, so he has a great story to tell. A bad storm rolls in while he attempts to raise the ship, causing his rope to get stuck. He runs out of oil and soon finds himself nearly running into a cliffside. Theodore and Northumberland rescue him. That night, Hank has a great story to tell the others and realizes that he doesn't have to be better than everyone else to be liked.
108	13	"Theodore and the Bickering Barges"	November 14, 2000	513
Theodore is put between Bayswater and Brunswick, barges who bicker over everything. When Theodore complains, the Dispatcher suggests he take only one barge at a time, which leads to a fight over who should go first. Theodore gets fed up and leaves. Finally, the barges agree that they need Theodore to finish their work.
109	14	"Theodore the All-Powerful"	December 8, 2000	514
Hank is convinced Theodore has superpowers because he had wished the fog would go away, and it did. Then he got the assignment he wished for. Hank is so sure of Theodore's powers that when a ship named Emma Sophia gets stuck, he refuses George's help because he thinks Theodore can wish her free. Theodore wishes Emma Sophia would move and George would go away. And sure enough, the smaller tugs manage to move Emma Sophia as the big tug leaves. But it turns out that George had just been helping Truro, the Fishing Trawler, in Ceilidh's Cove.
110	15	"George and the Flags"	December 23, 2000	515
A container ship named Chester arrives when the Big Harbor is having "Flag Day," where the boats wear flags. Chester, however, is upset that he doesn't have flags, and George completely ignores him. Later, when Chester gets some flags, he decides the Big Harbor is very friendly.
111	16	"Hank Stays Up Late"	January 1, 2001	516
Hank joins Theodore on the night shift, where he has the best time. The next few nights don't turn out to be as good as the first, so he returns to taking old bumpers to Shediac, the shipyard shed.
112	17	"Theodore the Tattletug"	January 13, 2001	517
Theodore comes across one of Emily's lifeboats adrift and rushes to tell the Dispatcher. Being helpful makes Theodore feel proud, and everything in the Big Harbor suddenly seems worthy of the Dispatcher's immediate attention. Instead of waking up Northumberland, Theodore tells the Dispatcher. Then he reports that Digby's cable spools are loose and that Carla is speeding with the time it takes Theodore to report that George's tow rope is too long, and Brunswick gets hurt. Theodore realizes tattling isn't usually the best way to solve a problem.
113	18	"Brunswick's Big Scare"	February 5, 2001	518
Brunswick Barge always enjoys thrills and chills, but he starts to think differently when a bad storm separates him and Theodore. He learns to be more careful after being pulled off some rocks by Theodore and Constance.
114	19	"Hank and the Silly Faces"	February 20, 2001	519
When Hank first meets Millie the Fishing Trawler, he thinks she's making silly faces. Millie is squinting because she can't see very well, but she doesn't tell him because she thinks people won't like her if she can't see. When she almost causes an accident, her secret is revealed. Instead of rejecting her, the tugs take Millie to the repair dock to get new glasses.
115	20	"Emily Finds a Friend"	March 7, 2001	520
Carla, the Cabin Cruiser, ruins a game of 'search and rescue' by being too bossy, so Theodore and Emily get mad and leave. When Carla gets lost, the tugs realize that if they had confronted Carla about being bossy, she wouldn't have gotten lost. When the tugs find her, she still insists on giving orders, but when her instructions undermine their efforts to free her, she realizes that some people should do things their way.
116	21	"Hank's Cozy Cove"	March 15, 2001	521
The tugs must bunk in a strange cove while their dock is being dredged, and everyone is having trouble falling asleep. Everyone but Hank had brought along his dock bumper. Theodore thinks they all could use a reminder of home, so he and Hank build a breaker from the rocks they are moving out of their dock. That calms the water, and soon everyone is cuddled up and fast asleep, just like at home.
117	22	"Theodore and the Hunt for Northumberland"	April 1, 2001	522
When Stewiacke the Salvage Ship arrives in the Harbor with Pugwash the Mini-sub, Northumberland hides. He's afraid Pugwash will bump him like she always does but later sees that some things can change.
118	23	"Bedford's Big Move"	April 19, 2001	523
Bedford Buoy feels sad that he can't go anywhere and asks Baddeck the Buoy Boat to take him to another harbor. Only with the love of his friends does he decide to change his mind.
119	24	"Emily Drifts Off"	May 8, 2001	524
Theodore has been playing practical jokes, so when Emily floats in her sleep and wakes up at the fuel dock instead of her dock, she blames him. Because she's sure Theodore is trying to trick her, she refuses his help. The next night, Emily drifts out into the ocean, and a worried Theodore saves her. Realizing what happened, she's finally convinced Theodore was telling the truth.
120	25	"Guysborough Makes a Friend"	May 21, 2001	525
Digby is told about Guysborough the Grumpy Garbage Barge. He instantly wants to make friends with him, but Theodore tries to prevent that. He didn't want Guyborough's feelings to get hurt because he's always grumpy, but Digby surprises them.
121	26	"Theodore and the Missing Siren"	June 4, 2001	526
Theodore is so excited by the bright red siren he's found he can't wait to play with it. But by the time he finishes work, he has lost it. It finally occurs to him to ask his friends if anyone has seen the siren. Sure enough, Emma Sophia, who he had helped dock earlier, had found it. Theodore is happy to have the siren back and is tempted to sound it, but that might make others think he is in trouble and isn't in trouble because he's found his siren.
122	27	"Pugwash is Gone"	June 20, 2001	527
Pugwash is sent to Ceilidh's Cove with George and Foduck to search for a piece of cargo that fell off a ship. While George and Foduck show off to Truro and Dorothy, Pugwash wanders off. Theodore arrives to see chaos and figures out a way to bring Pugwash back to the surface.
123	28	"Theodore and the Unsafe Ship"	July 11, 2001	528
Theodore is the tug in charge of bringing in a ship named Cabot, all by himself. When Theodore inspects Cabot, he notices his cargo is messy and unsafe. However, Cabot decides to go in alone because Theodore refuses to tow him. Cabot causes much trouble in the Harbor and even drops some of his cargo. The cargo tells Theodore that Cabot does everything you tell him not to do, so Theodore tricks him into running aground on the sandy beach. After that, Theodore tows Cabot to his dock backward.
124	29	"Emily and the Sleepover"	July 18, 2001	529
Carla, Emily, and a few friends have a sleepover at Ceilidh's Cove. Dorothy has trouble keeping up with the bigger boats, and when she falls asleep, they tie her safely to her dock and go to Shipwreck Rock to tell scary stories. They insist they aren't frightened by Emily's ghost story about a sunken ship that pulls passing vessels under the water. But Sigrid conveniently offers to check on Dorothy, and Carla hurries away when she sees Northumberland bubbling up right where the ghost is supposed to be.
125	30	"Foduck and the Shy Ship"	August 14, 2001	530
Foduck has his regular night safety patrol, but no one seems to enjoy his loud job. He's then told of a ship that's too shy to come into the Harbor and goes to convince the ship that the Big Harbor is very friendly.
126	31	"Theodore Takes Charge"	August 24, 2001	531
Theodore is unsure how to handle the harbor clean-up without losing his friends. He's afraid they'll be mad if he gives orders, so he keeps quiet. When nothing gets done, Theodore concludes he isn't good at being in charge, but the Dispatcher explains that people expect a tug in charge to be clear about what needs to be done. When Theodore takes the Dispatcher's advice, he discovers true friends follow a true leader.
127	32	"Theodore's Bright Night"	September 4, 2001	532
The tugs are upset when they discover that Queen Stephanie will be late, so Constance, the Coast Guard Ship plays a game with Theodore and Hank to cheer them up. At first, they want to go home until they realize Constance can be fun. Later, they invite her to the dock for storytelling time until the Queen arrives. Constance gets to meet the Queen, and everybody has a good time.
128	33	"George Waits His Turn"	September 11, 2001	533
George never wants to wait his turn. Most of the time, it's just annoying, but when Emily, Theodore, and George are sent to turn an iceberg away from the Harbor, George's impatience nearly results in disaster. His first reaction is to blame Emily, but he knows it's his fault. That night at story time, George struggles to wait his turn to tell about the iceberg adventure. Emily smiles and lets him go first. She knows George has learned his lesson.
129	34	"Hank Floats Forward"	September 30, 2001	534
Hank is so excited that he's finally allowed to move ships by himself that he doesn't pay attention when he helps Digby off Willy's Island. He gives the old cable ship a big scrape on the sharp rocks. Digby is upset and tells everyone that Hank isn't good at moving big ships. To help Hank restore his reputation, Theodore brings him along on his next job and puts the little tug in charge. With Theodore's encouragement, Hank does a good job with everyone watching, and even Digby has to admit that Hank might be a good tugboat after all.
130	35	"Theodore's Big Decision"	October 12, 2001	535
Pugwash goes missing when she gets lost in the Ecum Secum Circle, an underwater place where ships stay lost forever. Theodore joins the search but has trouble convincing Constance what to do. That's when Theodore makes a big decision that brings Pugwash back to the surface.

== See also ==
- Theodore Too
