= Fred Allen (set designer) =

Canadian set designer

- Born: 1942; Stewiacke, Nova Scotia
- Died: December 6, 2007 (aged 64–65); Truro, Nova Scotia
- Other names: Fed Allen
- Occupations: Set designer; art director; artist; model maker
- Years active: 1962–2007

Fred Allen (1942 – December 6, 2007) was a Canadian set designer, art director, artist and model maker, from Stewiacke, Nova Scotia.

== Early life ==
Born in Halifax, Nova Scotia in Canada, Allen never knew his birth mother, but was adopted and raised by Gwendolyn Poole of Wolfville, Nova Scotia until her death when Allen was 11. Allen was then raised by Poole's daughter in Stewiacke, Nova Scotia.

== Career ==
Allen began his career in 1962 as a set designer for Neptune Theatre in Halifax, Nova Scotia. He designed and built sets for many television shows, such as Coco, Streets Cents, and Blizzard Island, as well as for feature films and for Parks Canada and the Nova Scotia International Tattoo. He is best known as the creator of the models and sets for the popular children's television series Theodore Tugboat, as well as the vessel Theodore Too.

== Death ==
Allen died in Stewiacke, Nova Scotia on December 6, 2007, at the age of 64 or 65.

== Filmography ==
| Year | Title | Position | Notes |
|---|---|---|---|
| 1982 | Baker County, U.S.A. | Art director, set designer | Credited as Fed Allen |
| 1985 | DEFCON-4 | Art director, set designer | |
| 1988–1989 | Coco | Art director, set designer | |
| 1990 | Street Cents | Art director, set designer | |
| 1988–1989 | Blizzard Island | Prop builder | 6 episodes |
| 1993–2001 | Theodore Tugboat | Master props builder, model maker | 130 episodes |
