= Snyder's Shipyard =

Canadian shipbuilding company

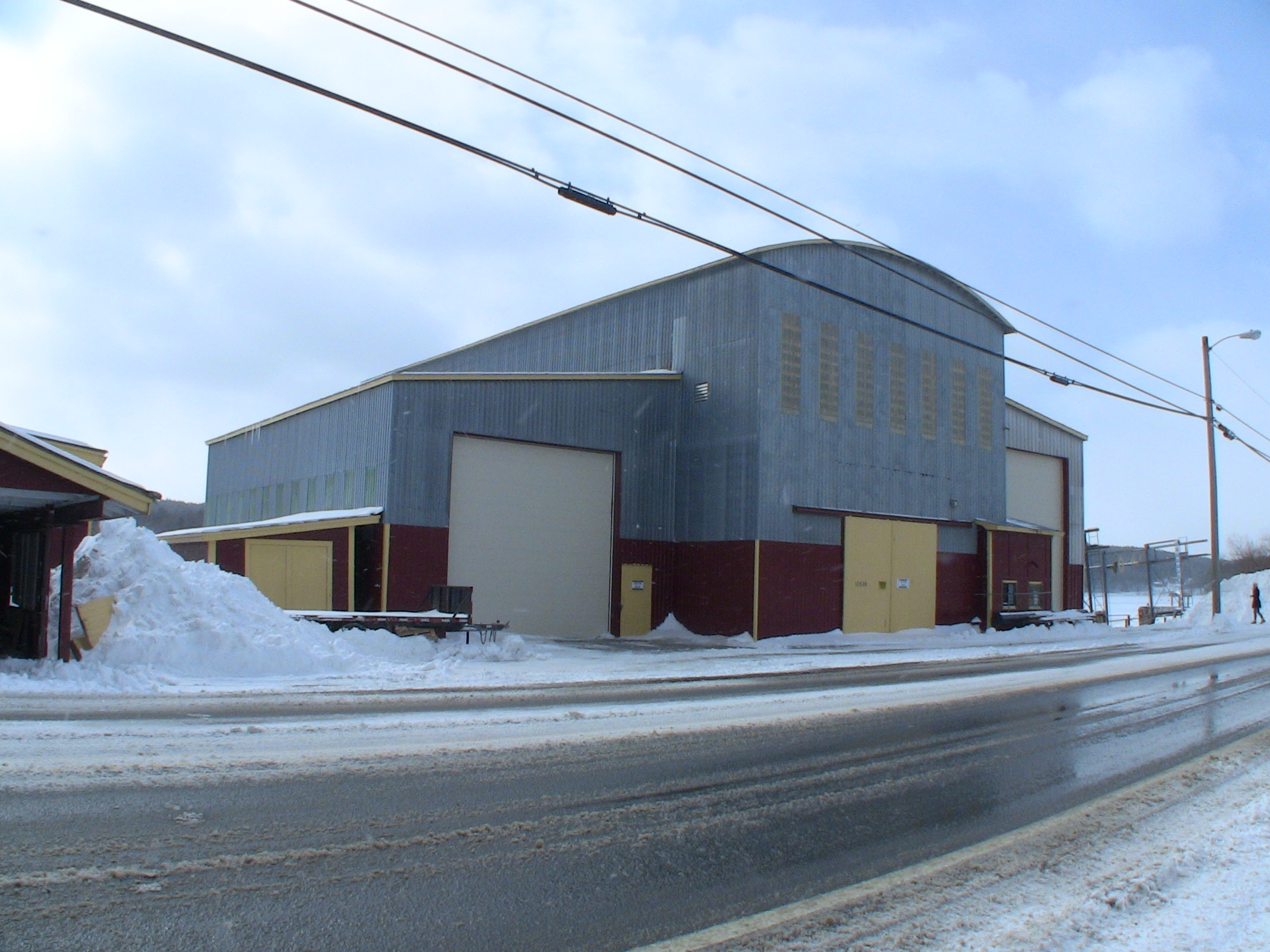
Snyder's Shipyard

Snyder's Shipyard Ltd. is a boatbuilding company located in Dayspring, Lunenburg County, Nova Scotia. The company is known to have built and repaired over 220 boats and vessels, most notable being the Bluenose II schooner and Theodore Too.

== History ==
The shipyard was initially started under the name of Leary's, with records dating back to 1871, a time when establishing owner Stephen Leary and sons Melbourne and Maurice Leary were building large-scale ships with keels up to 74 ft. in length, using iron work. The shipyard was purchased by Reginald "Teddy" Snyder in 1944, who designed and built vessels as well as parts of the shipyard facilities. After working 53 years as a shipwright and 10 years spent as the owner of Snyder's, Snyder retired from the business in 1987, passing ownership to his son Phillip.

== Details of the shipyard ==
The first permanent boat-building shed to be built was constructed in 1969 and measuring 100 feet by 40 feet. Before the erection of this building vessels were constructed outside. In 1992, a second building was constructed to build its first 67-foot vessel indoors. The third building constructed by Acadian Construction of Bridgewater brings a total of 10,000 square-feet of working space to the shipyard. In 1988, many boatyards were reducing their amount of productivity and number of staff. Snyder's underwent expansion of their facilities with the construction a third new 3000-square-foot building and increased their staff to 35 full-time employees in order to build larger vessels to meet current demands. Cost of this expansion estimated $135,000. Snyder's received a sum of $32,125 from the Atlantic Opportunities Agency's Industrial and Regional Development Program (IRDP) contributed to expansion costs.

== Ships and boats constructed at Snyder's Shipyard ==
- Ocean Pride III, 44-foot, 11-inch stern dragger, made of oak, 360-horsepower Caterpillar diesel, 195th to be built at Snyder's --C.H., Sept. 27/1980
- The Cody and Kathryn, 50-foot dragger, built for Capt. Schrader, 210th vessel launched from shipyard—C.H., Wed, Oct. 12/1988
- The Lady Cavell, built for Steven Gough of New Brunswik, 64-foot, 11-inch herring seiner, the 211th vessel to be built at Snyder's -- C.H., Mon. April 10/1989
- Island Bounty, 78-foot herring seiner—C.H., Wed. April 17, 1991
- Pasty and Sons, 60-foot longliner owned by Burnell Allison of Port Mouton
- Theodore Too, 2000
- Repairs conducted on the Bluenose II in March 1994.
- Bluenose one-design sloop - current manufacturer, 2018

=== Vessels constructed at the shipyard while under the name Leary's ===
- The Avon Spirit,
- Reginald R. Moulton, round-bow schooner, 112 tons, built by M. Leary for the fleet of J.T. Moulton of Newfoundland, 1917
