= Theodore Tugboat =

Children's television series

- Genre: Children's television
- Created by: Andrew Cochran
- Written by: Jeff Rosen; Bob Stutt; Kathy MacLellan; Maureen Wheller; Cheryl Wagner; Silver Donald Cameron; Vicki Grant; Lynn M. Turner
- Directed by: Robert D. Cardona; David Coole; Charles Bishop; Peter Sutherland; Shandi Mitchell
- Presented by: Denny Doherty
- Music by: Graham Shaw
- Country of origin: Canada
- Original language: English
- No. of seasons: 5
- No. of episodes: 130 (75 aired in Canada) (list of episodes)

Production
- Producer: Andrew Cochran
- Editor: William Jardine
- Running time: 15 minutes
- Production company: Cochran Entertainment

Original release
- Network: CBC (1993–2001 Canada); PBS/PBS Kids (1996–2002 USA)
- Release: July 5, 1993 – October 12, 2001

Theodore Tugboat is a Canadian children's television series about an anthropomorphic tugboat named Theodore who lives in the Big Harbour with all of his friends. The show, which aired from 1993 to 2001, originated (and is set) in Halifax, Nova Scotia, Canada as a co-production between the CBC (Canadian Broadcasting Corporation), and the now defunct Cochran Entertainment. It was filmed on a model set using radio controlled tugboats, ships, and machinery. Production of the show ended in 2001, and its distribution rights were later sold to Classic Media (now DreamWorks Classics). The show premiered in Canada on CBC Television, then went to PBS (Public Broadcasting Service), was on Qubo in the United States, and has appeared in eighty countries.

The show deals with life learning issues portrayed by the tugs or other ships in the harbour. Most often, the tugs have a problem, or get involved in a struggle with each other or another ship, but they always manage to help one another resolve these problems and see them through. Their main focus however, is to always make the Big Harbour the friendliest harbour in the world, and to always do a good job with their work related tasks.

== Origins ==
The original idea for the series came to Halifax native Andrew Cochran, as he tried to explain the unique characteristics and work of Halifax Harbour vessels to his three-year-old son while walking along the Halifax waterfront. According to Cochran, "When you are with kids, you tend to give human characteristics to buildings, cars and boats." Cochran and his production company, Cochran Entertainment, went on to lead the development of the series with the CBC in Canada, starting in 1989. Production commenced in 1992 with the first broadcasts aired on CBC in 1993. Cochran Entertainment produced all 130 original episodes with Cochran as the executive producer. Jeff Rosen served as the Executive Story Editor and Principal Writer of the series. The designs and faces for most of the characters were created by art director and master model maker Fred Allen. CBC Art Director Tom Anthes designed the set, which featured buildings and structures of Halifax Harbour. More than 60 of the 130 episodes were directed by Robert Cardona, the co-creator of the television show Tugs and producer for Seasons 1 and 2 of Thomas & Friends. These series employed techniques later used in Theodore Tugboat such as humanized vehicles, life lessons and the use of a 1960s pop culture figure as narrator.

== Characters ==
The show has one human character, The Harbourmaster, and five central tugboat characters, led by the show's namesake, Theodore Tugboat. Other ships, of all sizes, provide a large number of regular and occasional characters along with a few talking structures.

=== The Harbourmaster ===
Along with all the duties of a real-life harbourmaster, The Harbourmaster is the host and narrator of the series, and provides voices for the entire cast of characters. He is the only human on the show to be played live by a screen actor (other on-screen humans being small figurines, much like the first twelve seasons of Thomas and Friends), and is portrayed in the Canadian and US versions by the late Denny Doherty, formerly of The Mamas & the Papas, and by other performers internationally. The Harbourmaster introduces the theme at the beginning of every episode by addressing an issue that he has in common with the tugs. He also loves to play the tuba and is a good friend of a man named Rodney (who is never seen). The role, and the person playing the role, is similar to that of Shining Time Station, the American series that featured Thomas & Friends; like Theodore Tugboat, that series initially starred (and was narrated by) an entertainment figure associated with the 1960s. Ringo Starr (of The Beatles), and later, comedian George Carlin, both played the role of "Mr. Conductor". He also, like the narrator of TUGS, but unlike the narrators of Thomas the Tank Engine (Starr & Carlin at least) – can communicate on screen with the Tugboats.

=== Tugboats ===
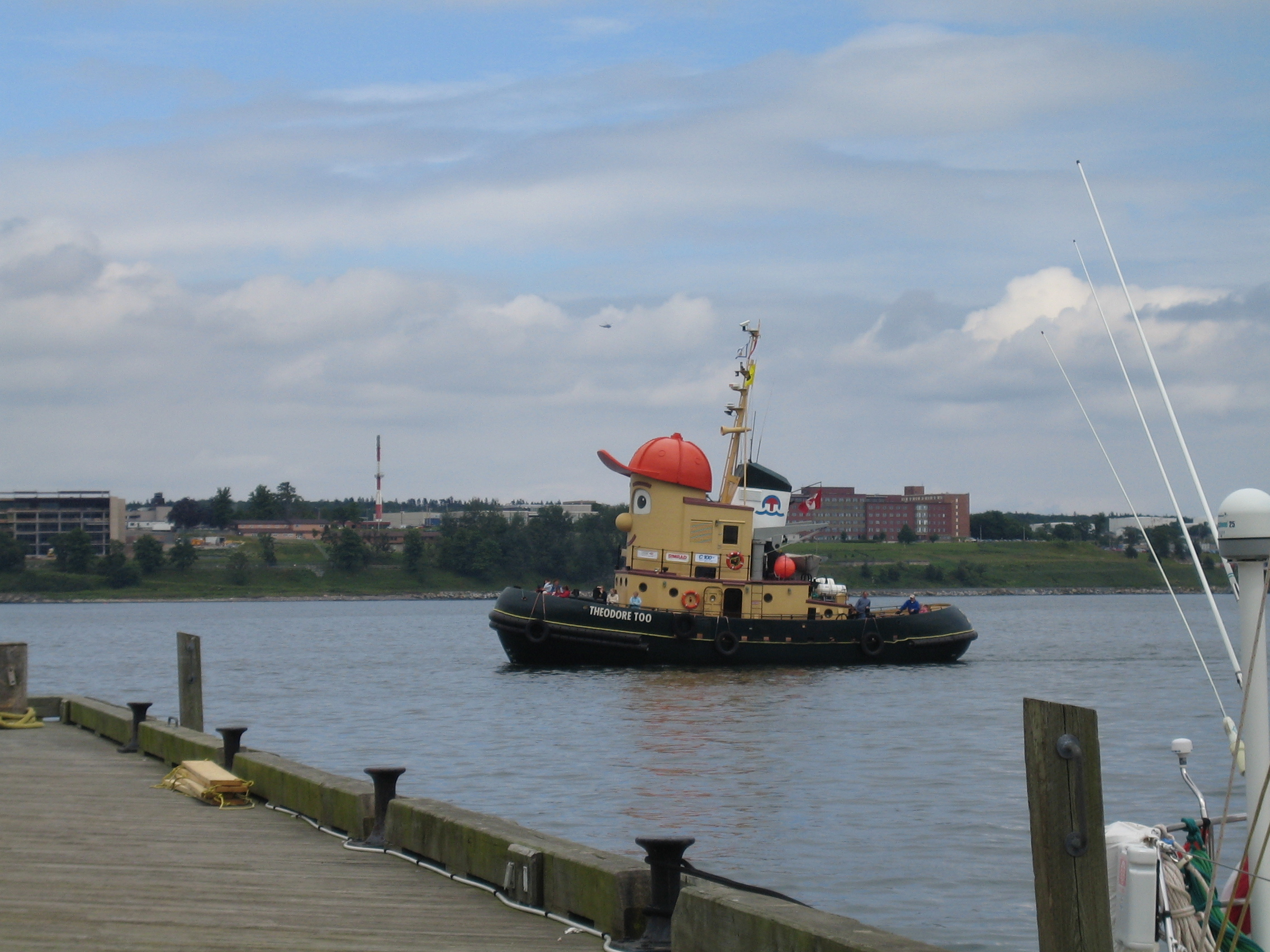
This life-size version of Theodore Tugboat, Theodore Too plies the waters of Halifax Harbour.

- Theodore Tugboat: Theodore is the title character who lives in the Big Harbour with all of his friends. He's one of the smaller tugs who wears a red baseball cap, and is sometimes offended if someone calls him "cute" or "small". He and his closest friend Hank are the only two harbour tugs (tugs that are not yet eligible to work outside harbour boundaries). They both share the harbour tug side of the dock and love working together. He's a kind little tugboat that is always friendly to the other ships in the harbour, with the goal of befriending everyone he meets. His biggest dream is to become an ocean tug and to travel across the sea to different harbours, but before he does, he works as hard as he can to make the Big Harbour the friendliest harbour in the world. That's why he is always there whenever someone needs him.
- Hank: Hank (the Volcano, as he sometimes calls himself) is the smallest, funniest, fastest tugboat in the Big Harbour. He wears a blue toque and loves to make funny faces and noises as a way of getting attention. He can be very sensitive too, and usually gets ignored for being the smallest. Whenever he feels down, he always turns to Theodore for help or guidance. Hank was afraid of the dark once, but overcomes his fear when Theodore tells him that he was once afraid of the dark too. Sometimes Hank is the one to give a good idea without even knowing it. He always forgets to tuck in his anchor, so the other tugs always remind him every now and then. He has the tendency to use the word "fresh" to describe something. Out of all the other tugboats, Hank is special because of his good humour and nature to learn and grow from his mistakes.
- Emily "the Vigorous": Emily is the only female tug in the fleet. She wears an old turquoise fishing hat that is very special to her. She loves to travel to different countries and discover new cultures and languages. Emily likes to be admired, but hates to look silly in front of her friends thinking they always have high expectations for her, and look up to her as a leader. Still, she always comes to find that her friends are there to help her, even if she doesn't ask for their help. She usually gets into arguments with George, but they always resolve their differences in the end. No matter how upset Emily gets, she always shows her kind spirits and strength.
- George "the Valiant": George is the largest and strongest tugboat in the Big Harbour. He wears a purple baseball cap on his head backwards. George loves to show off and can sometimes be a little rude without knowing it. He's somewhat stubborn and always struggles to admit that he is sometimes wrong. He especially loves to tell stories to the other tugs, mostly about himself. Whenever he gets irritated, he blows up a lot of smoke from his smokestack and makes loud noises with his powerful engines. Most of all, George is a hard worker, never leaves a job until it's done, and always stands up for his friends.
- Foduck "the Vigilant": Foduck is the harbour's safety tug. He wears a dark red firefighter's hat and is equipped with extra bright spotlights, sonar transceiver and a fire hose. Foduck is always very serious and makes sure all jobs are being performed safely. Foduck is a V tug like George and Emily, meaning he is fully qualified to make ocean voyages, but is content with staying in the harbour to keep it safe. Because of his strong work ethic, Foduck usually doesn't express his feelings, but deep inside, he has a soft spot in his heart for everything and everyone in the harbour.
- The Dispatcher: The tugboat Dispatcher is a rotating building on the "Great Ocean Tug and Salvage Company" wharf, who assigns the tugs their jobs for the day. He has a black moustache and a flag on his head. He is usually very serious and strict with the tugs, but they are always respectful to him because of his authority-like figure. He shows that he cares for the tugs by disciplining them for their faults, and by counselling them for their mistakes. And like a father, he always has a gentle side to him, and is always there when the tugboats need his help the most.

=== Regular characters ===
A number of ships based in the Big Harbour appear as recurring characters. They include Phillip and Philmore the Ferry Twins, Pearl and Petra, the Pilot Boats, as well as Northumberland Submarine, Rebecca the Research Vessel, and Bluenose the Sailing Ship. A number of barges appear frequently, most notably the grumpy Guysborough the Garbage Barge and Barrington Barge as well as a few regular talking structures such as Benjamin Bridge and Donald Dock.

=== Visiting characters ===
Many visiting ships such as Kingston the Cargo Ship, Queen Stephanie the cruise ship, and Canso Colossus the supertanker appear in several episodes along with a large number of named visiting cargo ships and some rare special visitors such as Snorri the Viking Ship and Kulu the Canoe.

== Episodes ==
Season	Episodes	Originally aired	
Season	Episodes	First aired	Last aired
1	20	July 5, 1993	July 30, 1993
2	20	December 7, 1994	February 1, 1995
3	25	June 7, 1996	March 7, 1997
4	30	September 12, 1998	April 16, 1999
5	35	June 4, 2000	October 12, 2001

== The program's formula ==
Each episode always follows the same format within the series.

=== Opening sequence ===
The show always opens with the theme song, and the opening title dissolves into the Harbourmaster's office. The Harbourmaster is normally doing something or thinking about something, which prompts him to remember when one of the tugboats was involved in a similar scenario.

=== Main sequence ===
As the Harbourmaster starts telling the story, the camera shot dissolves into a shot of the tugs working somewhere, or getting their orders from the Dispatcher. In the first few minutes of the episode, the tugs encounter a problem, and they use their heads to solve it. "It is the classic three-act structure," said series creator Andrew Cochran, "Theodore encounters a problem, the problem gets worse, he solves the problem." Other times, the tugs have to conquer an emotional problem, such as not feeling good enough, or having to say goodbye to a friend. As each episode continues, the tugs resolve their problems, and life returns to normal in the Big Harbour.

=== Closing sequence ===
The scene again dissolves into a shot of the Harbourmaster's office, with the Harbourmaster deciding to pay attention to the lesson learned by the tugs. During this time, he sometimes communicates with the tugs through his office window (they reply with the sound of their whistles), plays his tuba, or listens to his friend Rodney playing bagpipes. The Harbourmaster finally says "Thanks for visiting us here in the Big Harbour, and we'll see you all again next time.", and the credits roll.

On the half-hour PBS series, following the first story, the Harbourmaster's goodbye is instead followed by a voice-over, reminding viewers to stay tuned for the next story, and prompting them to visit the PBS website.

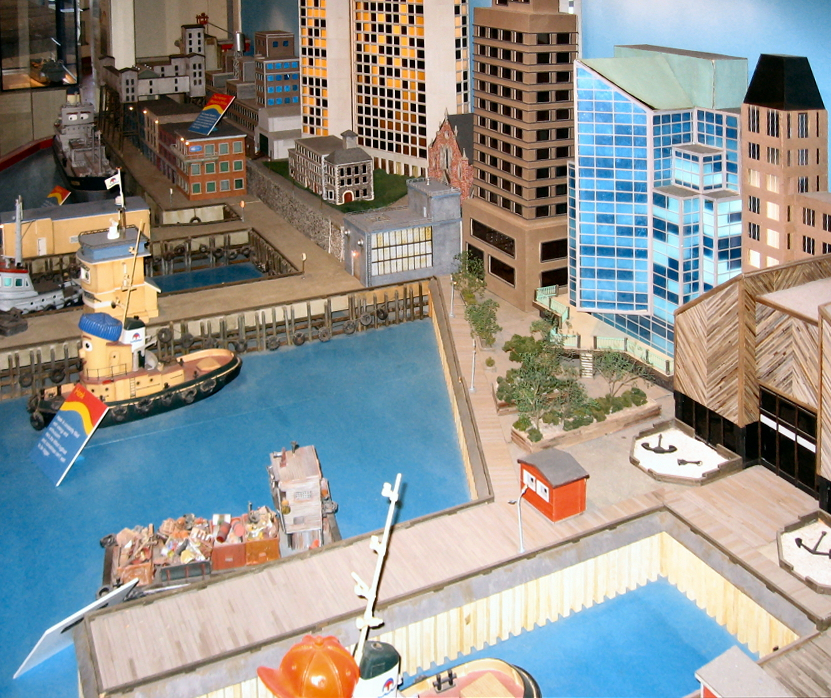
2View of the Theodore Tugboat studio models used for filming the children's television series. They were photographed on permanent display at the Maritime Museum of the Atlantic in Halifax, Nova Scotia. Virtually, all of the buildings are based on actual buildings on the Halifax waterfront.

== Production ==
The series was filmed in the former Alexander McKay School on Russell Street in Halifax's North End, which Doherty (the Harbourmaster) had attended as a child. At the peak of production, the show employed forty people. The characters, including Theodore, were designed and built by Fred Allen, a Halifax artist and set designer who strove to balance expressive human faces with realistic and weathered industrial details. Allen and three model assistants built the models in a workshop adjacent to the large set located in a water-filled gymnasium. The radio controlled models were driven by propellers and used underwater wheels to provide guidance and avoid drifting out of shots. Blue food colour was used to give an ocean look to the water. While Allen built the vessel models, the background set, inspired by the cityscape of Halifax and Dartmouth buildings, was built by the art department at CBC Halifax. Many of the original models used to film the series can now be seen at Halifax's Maritime Museum of the Atlantic, while a few others were sold on eBay in 2010.

== Real names and locations ==
The characters are loaded with references to Halifax Harbour, Nova Scotia, the Maritimes, and Atlantic Canada in general. Many of the references are obvious (such as Bedford buoy) while others are more obscure. The following is a list of other references:

- The Big Harbour itself is modelled after Halifax Harbour, in Nova Scotia.
- The tugs occasionally visit a fishing village called Ceilidh's Cove, which is loosely modelled from Peggys Cove, a real-life fishing community in Nova Scotia.
- Some of the tugboat characters' V-names are derived from actual tugboats that operate in Halifax Harbour, including Point Vigour and Point Valiant.
- Annapolis (a cargo ship) is named after Annapolis Royal in southwestern Nova Scotia.
- Baddeck (the buoy boat) is named after the village of Baddeck, Nova Scotia
- Barrington (the smallest barge) is likely named after the municipality of Barrington, Nova Scotia, which is located in the southwestern region of the province near Shelburne. He may have also gotten his name from one of Halifax's best-known streets, Barrington Street, which runs straight through the downtown core parallel to the harbour.
- Bedford (the buoy by Willy's Island) is based on both the name (Bedford Basin), part of Halifax Harbour, and the former town of Bedford located at the head of the basin.
- Benjamin Bridge (the bridge across the harbour) is based on the name Benjamin Bridge, Nova Scotia, a place near Wolfville. (More recently the name is primarily associated with a winery located there, but the winery was founded in 1999, about six years after the character was introduced.)
- Blandford (the buoy at the harbour entrance) is named after the fishing community of Blandford, Nova Scotia, which later gained international fame as a base from which the rescue efforts of Swissair Flight 111 were carried out.
- Bluenose (a sailing ship) is named after the famous racing schooner of the 1920s, the Bluenose. A replica of the "Bluenose", the "Bluenose II" sails as a promotional vessel for Nova Scotia. Bluenose is also the name of the naval tug in Tugs.
- Bonavista (one of the barges) is named after the fishing town of Bonavista, located in the province of Newfoundland.
- Brunswick Barge shares his name with both Brunswick Street in downtown Halifax and the province of New Brunswick
- Cabot (the cargo ship) is named after the Cabot Trail, a highway that takes sight-seeres through the scenic mountainous regions of northern Cape Breton Island.
- Canso Colossus (the supertanker) is named after the small fishing town of Canso, Nova Scotia on the southeast coast.
- Caraquet (the container ship) shares her name with the town of Caraquet, New Brunswick, located on the shores of Chaleur Bay, in the Acadian Peninsula. "Caraquet" is a native Mi'kmaq word, meaning "junction (or meeting) of two rivers".
- Chester (the container ship) gets his name from the seaside village of Chester, Nova Scotia.
- Cobequid Cove (visited in the episode "The Dark and Scary Cove") shares its name with both the Cobequid Bay and the Cobequid Hills mountain range of mainland Nova Scotia. Cobequid is a proud, historic, and distinctly Nova Scotian name, derived from the native Mi'kmaq word "Wakobetgitk", meaning "end of the rushing or flowing water" (in reference to the Bay of Fundy).
- Cumberland gets his name from Cumberland County, Nova Scotia, which is located in the province's northwest region.
- Dartmouth (a visiting cable ship) is named after the former city of Dartmouth, Nova Scotia, which lies on the eastern shore of Halifax Harbour. Dartmouth's municipal government was amalgamated into the Halifax Regional Municipality in 1996, but the area still retains its original name.
- Digby (the cable ship) is named after Digby, Nova Scotia, a seaside community on the northwest shore of Nova Scotia, famous for its scallop fishing.
- Ecum Secum Circle (visited in the episode "Theodore's Big Decision") shares its name with the rural community of Ecum Secum, Nova Scotia, which is located along the shores of Ecum Secum Harbour. Named in the language of the Mi'kmaq, First Nations people, "Ecum Secum" translates to English as "a red house".
- Fundy (the fishing boat) gets his name from the Bay of Fundy, the body of water that separates southern Nova Scotia from southern New Brunswick and eastern Maine, and is the body of water with the world's largest tides, that can exceed 16 metres or 52.5 feet.
- Guysborough (the garbage barge) is named after Guysborough County on the south shore of Nova Scotia.
- Inverness (the cargo ship) gets her name from the community of Inverness, Nova Scotia, which is located on the west coast of Cape Breton Island.
- Lunenburg (the lighthouse by Shipwreck Rock) is named after the port town of Lunenburg, Nova Scotia, which is where the original Bluenose was built and the Bluenose II calls home.
- Margaree Pride (a container ship) shares her name with the communities of Upper, East, Northeast, and Southwest Margaree, Margaree Centre, Margaree Valley, Margaree Forks, Margaree Harbour, and the Margaree River, all in Inverness County, Nova Scotia.
- Northumberland (the submarine) is named after the Northumberland Strait, a body of water that lies between New Brunswick, Nova Scotia mainland, and Prince Edward Island.
- Pictou Peaks (a cluster of giant rocks poking up out of the water near the shallow shore). Seen in the episode "Emily Goes Overboard", The 'Pictou Peaks' share their name with the historic port Town of Pictou, located in Pictou County, Nova Scotia. It is believed the name is derived from the word "Piktook", which means "an explosion of gas" in the language of the local Mi'kmaq, First Nations people.
- Pugwash (the little yellow mini-sub) shares her name with the fishing and salt mining village of Pugwash, Nova Scotia, located on the Northumberland Strait at the mouth of the Pugwash River. The village takes its name from the word "pagwe’ak", a native Mi'kmaq word meaning "deep water".
- Seabright (the cargo ship) is named after the tiny community of Seabright, Nova Scotia, which is located southwest of Halifax.
- Shediac (a supply shed at the shipyard dock) shares his name with the town of Shediac, New Brunswick, which holds the nickname "Lobster Capital of the World".
- Shelburne (the giant sea-going barge) is named after the town of Shelburne, Nova Scotia, which lies on the southwest shore of the province.
- Stewiacke (the salvage ship) gets his name from the town of Stewiacke, Nova Scotia, which is located halfway between the equator and the north pole. It was also the hometown of Fred Allen, the artist who designed and built the characters and set of Theodore Tugboat.
- Truro (the fishing trawler) gets his name from the town of Truro, Nova Scotia, which is known as the Hub of Nova Scotia for its central location and historical importance to the province's railroad network.
- It was also revealed in the episode "Hank's New Name" that Emily's middle name is Annapolis, after Annapolis County in northwest Nova Scotia.

== Media ==
=== Theodore Tugboat VHS tapes ===
==== Canadian VHS tapes ====
The Canadian Theodore VHS tapes were made by The Children's Group and PolyGram Video. They contained stickers of all the tugboats and two episodes.

===== The list =====
1. Theodore to the Rescue – "Theodore to the Rescue" and "Theodore and the Northern Lights"
2. Theodore's Whistle – "Theodore's Whistle" and "George's Ghost"
3. Theodore's Big Adventures – "Theodore and the Oil Rig" and "Hank and the Hug"
4. Whale of a Tug – "Whale of a Tug" and "Carla the Cool Cabin Cruiser"
5. Hank and the Nightlight – "Hank and the Nightlight" and "Theodore Hugs the Coast"
6. Theodore and the Harbour Crane – "Theodore and the Harbour Crane" and "Hank's Wheezy Whistle"
7. Theodore and the Treasure Team – "Northumberland is Missing" and "All Quiet in the Big Harbour"
8. Emily Goes Overboard – "Emily Goes Overboard" and "Dartmouth Says Goodbye"

==== US tapes ====
The US Theodore Tugboat tapes were released through PBS Home Video and Warner Home Video. Most of these tapes are common on online sites. They usually contain three episodes, with the exception of "Theodore's Big Adventure" with two, and "Theodore's Exceptional Friends" which has five, also containing a special handbook.

===== The list =====
1. Theodore's Big Adventure (July 29, 1997) (PBS version) – "Theodore and the Big Oil Rig", and "Hank and the Hug"
2. Big Harbour Bedtime (July 14, 1998) – "Emily and the Sleep Over", "Theodore's Bright Night", and "Foduck and the Shy Ship"
3. Theodore Helps a Friend (July 14, 1998) – "Theodore and the Hunt for Northumberland", "Bedford's Big Move", and Guysborough Makes a Friend"
4. Theodore's Friendly Adventures (July 14, 1998) – "Theodore and the Unsafe Ship", "A Joke too Far", and "Hank and the Sunken Ship"
5. Theodore's Exceptional Friends (October 26, 1999) – "Snorri the Viking Ship", "Guysborough's Garbage", "Hank Hurts a Ship", Theodore and the Ice Ship", and "Dartmouth Says Goodbye"
6. Nighttime Adventures (April 4, 2000) – "Night Shift", "Rebeca and the Big Snore", and "Hank Stays Up Late"
7. Underwater Mysteries (April 4, 2000) – "Theodore's Big Decision", "George and the Underwater Mystery", and "Pugwash is Gone!"

=== Theodore Tugboat DVDs ===
The Murphy's Company Store in Halifax has copies of some US releases on DVD. These include; Big Harbor Bedtime, Nighttime Adventures, and Theodore's Friendly Adventures. In 2007, 2 DVD volumes were released in Norway, Denmark, Sweden, and Finland. A DVD was released in The Netherlands in 2012, followed by a second volume in 2013.

=== Theodore Tugboat books ===
In a deal Cochran did with Random House in 1998, the following Theodore Tugboat books were published

- Theodore and the Whale by Mary Man-Kong, illustrated by Bernat Serrat as part of the Please Read to Me series [9780679894216] Released March 16, 1999, Trade Paperback
- Theodore and the Scary Cove by Mary Man-Kong as part of the Early Step Into Reading series [9780375805080 and 9780375905087] Released July 25, 2000, Trade Paperback and Library Binding
- Theodore and the Treasure Hunt by Mary Man-Kong; illustrated by Francesc Mateu [9780375800863] Released December 10, 1999, Board Book
- Theodore to the Rescue by Random House; illustrated by Ken Edwards as part of the Jellybean books series for preschoolers.[9780375803253] Released June 27, 2000
- Theodore's Best Friend by Mary Man-Kong, illustrated by Ken Edwards as part of the Jellybean books series for preschoolers. [9780679894094 and 9780679994091] Released September 1, 1999, Hardcover
- Theodore's Splash! by Mary Man-Kong, illustrated by Ken Edwards [9780679894100] Released February 16, 1999, A bath time book
- Theodore's Whistle by Man-Kong, Mary [9780679894193] Released January 9, 1998, Trade Paperback
- Theodore and the Stormy Day by Ivan Robertson, illustrated by Ken Edwards as part of the Jellybean books series for preschoolers. [9780375800764] Released July 20, 1999, Hardcover
- Theodore's Birthday Surprise illustrated by Phil Gleaves as part of the Jellybean books series for preschoolers.[9780375802492] Released January 25, 2000, Hardcover

In the late 2000s Nimbus Publishing released a series of books featuring Theodore Too.

- Theodore Too and the Too-Long Nap By Michelle Mulder; Illustrated By: Yolanda Poplawska [9781551095714] Published April 15, 2006
- Theodore Too and the Shipwreck School By Michelle Mulder; Illustrated By: Yolanda Poplawska [9781551096094] Published June 8, 2007
- Theodore Too and the Mystery Guest By Michelle Mulder; Illustrated By: Yolanda Poplawska [9781551096599] Published May 14, 2008
- Theodore Too and the Excuse-Me Monster By Michelle Mulder; Illustrated By: Yolanda Poplawska [9781551098074] Published April 6, 2011

== Merchandise ==
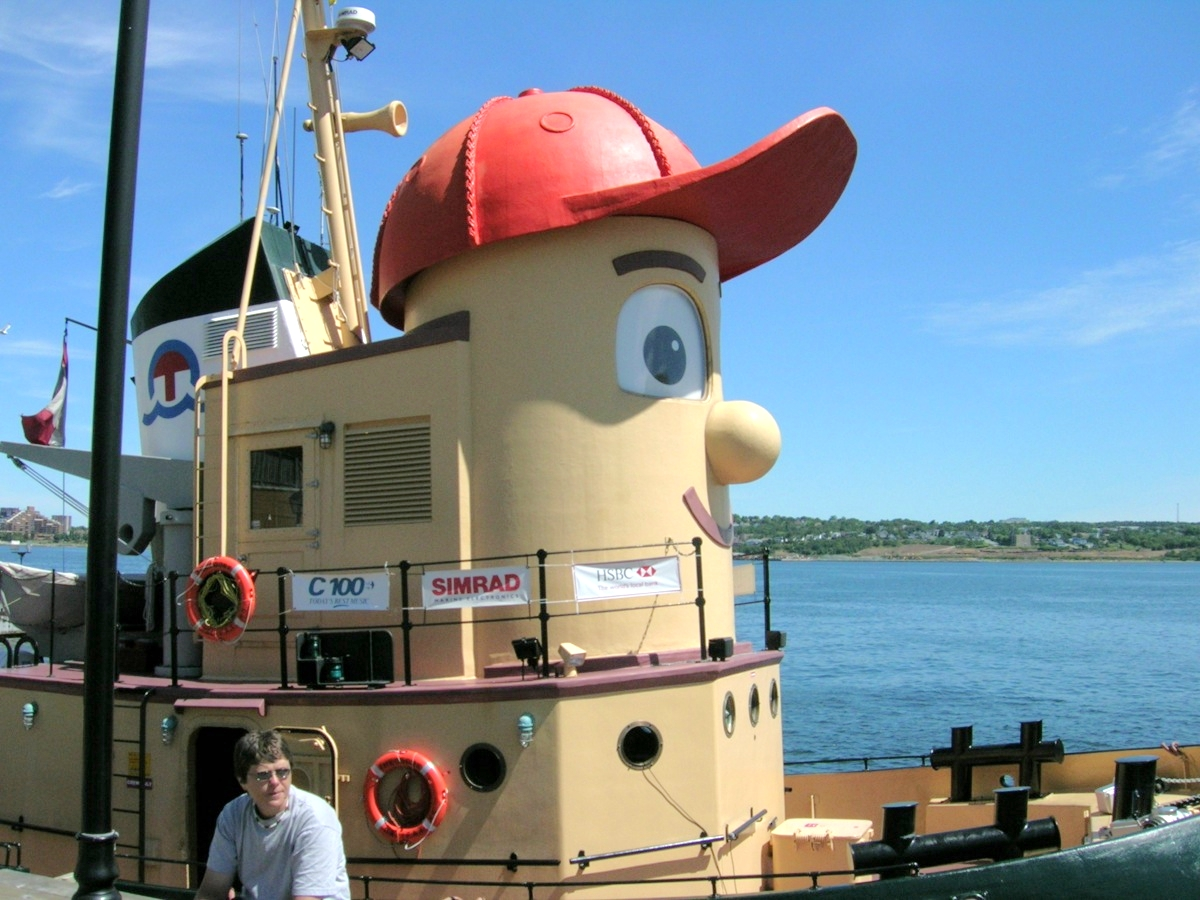
Theodore Too

There were several tie-ins linked with the series. Notably, the producers, Cochran Entertainment, worked out a marketing deal with European toy manufacturer BRIO to produce wooden toy replicas of some of the main characters, as well as a line of scale die-cast models and bathtub toys manufactured by Ertl. The characters were retired in 2000. A set of squeezy toys were made by Alpi. Puzzles and games were made by International Playthings.

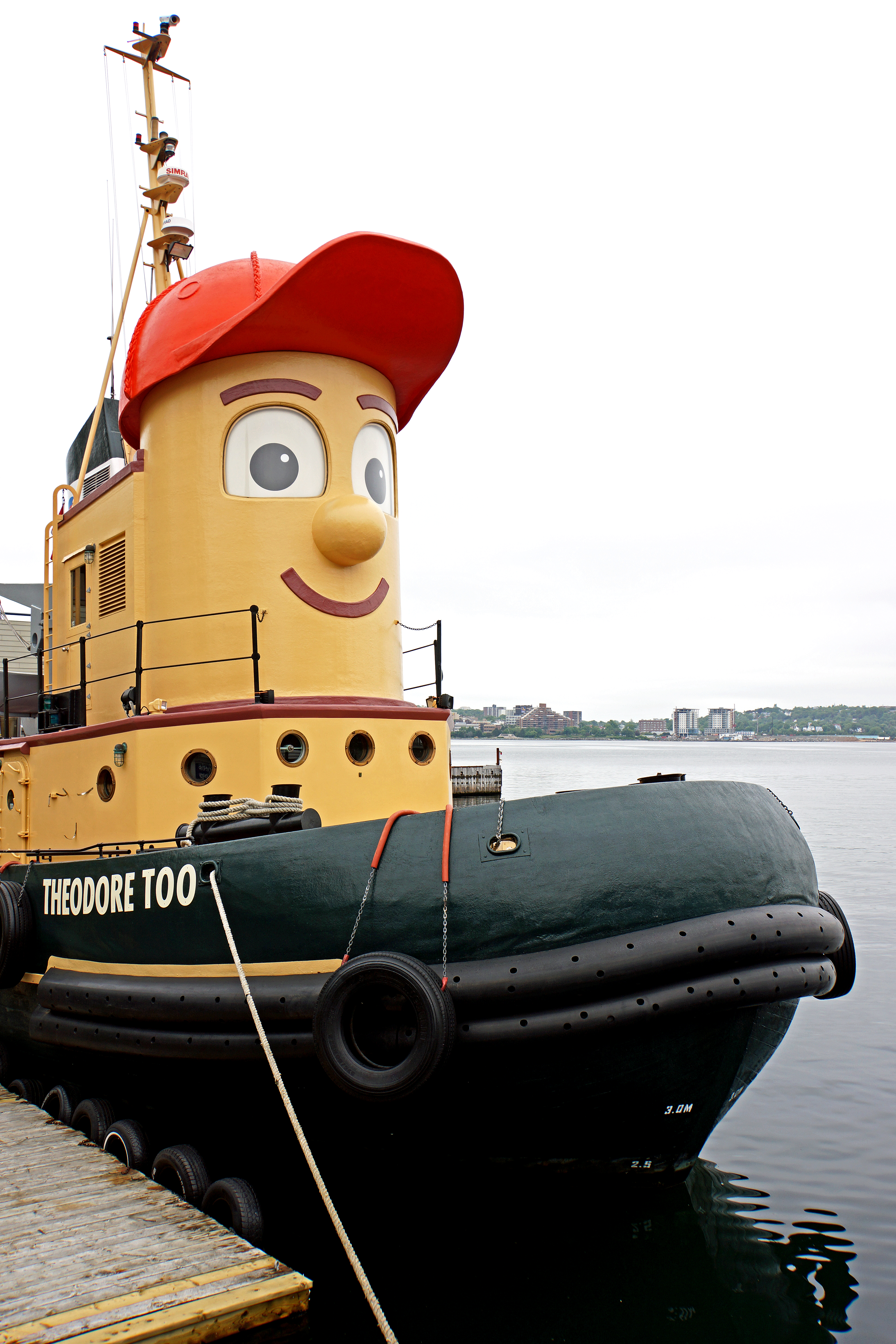
Theodore Too, a fullsize replica of Theodore Tugboat, titular star of the children's show, docked at Murphys Cable Wharf provides tours of Halifax Harbour in the summer.

A life-sized replica of Theodore Tugboat (called Theodore Too) was constructed by the series producers in the late 1990s, that went on a fifty-city tour of harbours from Tampa, Florida, through the Great Lakes to Chicago, Illinois, and back again to Halifax. It resided in Halifax Harbour for 21 years.

In mid-2020, the touring company, Ambassatours Gray Line, announced plans to sell the replica boat for CAD$496,000. Response from the public was generally nostalgic and emotional, as many, especially Haligonians who had not only grown up with the show, but with the boat as well. The boat was purchased in March 2021 by Blair McKeil. Theodore Too left Halifax harbour on June 10, 2021 for the Port of Hamilton, Hamilton, Ontario where it will be used to promote water conservation in the Great Lakes.

== See also ==
- Thomas & Friends, another show Robert Cardona worked on
- Tugs, another show Robert Cardona worked on
- Ferry Boat Fred
