= Dayspring, Nova Scotia =

Community in Nova Scotia, Canada

Coordinates: 44°21′52.58″N 64°28′51.57″W

Dayspring in Nova Scotia

Dayspring is a community in the Canadian province of Nova Scotia, located on the banks of the Lahave River in the Lunenburg Municipal District in Lunenburg County. It is home to the traditional wooden shipyard, Snyder's Shipyard, builders of Theodore Too, among many other vessels, as well as The Riverview Enhanced Living Centre, Miller's Point Peace Park, the Municipal Activity and Recreation Complex and the Bridgewater/Dayspring Airpark.

== History ==
During the French and Indian War, there were a number of Mi'kmaq and Acadian raids on the newly arrived Protestant settlers on the Lunenburg Peninsula. By the end of May 1758, many of those on the Lunenburg Peninsula abandoned their farms and retreated to the protection of the fortifications around the town of Lunenburg, losing the season for sowing their grain. For those that did not leave their farms for the town, the number of raids intensified.

During the summer of 1758, there were four raids on the Lunenburg Peninsula. On 13 July 1758, one person on the LaHave River at "Dayspring" was killed and another seriously wounded by a member of the Labrador family.

Throughout the Age of Sail Dayspring boasted three shipyards, a saw mill, associated blacksmiths, several general stores, 2 churches, a school, several fraternal lodges and number of large farms.

== Modern ==
As with many rural villages today, both churches, the school and other local services have closed. Dayspring is now largely a bedroom community of neighbouring Bridgewater, Nova Scotia.
