= Theodore Too =

Large-scale imitation tugboat

Coordinates: 44.64944°N 63.57128°W

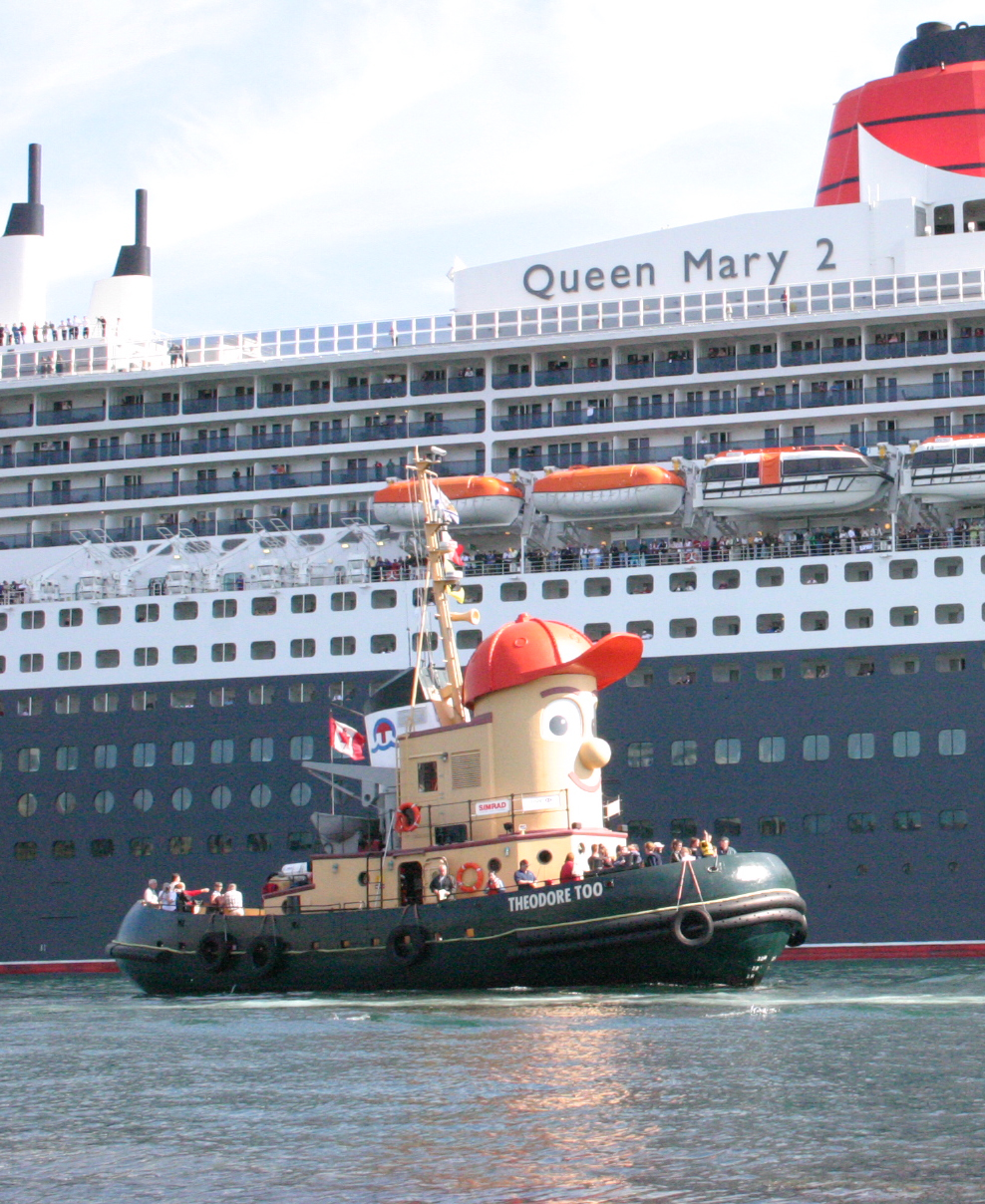
- Theodore Too next to the ocean liner Queen Mary 2 in Halifax Harbour on September 25, 2004.

History

Canada
- Name: Theodore Too
- Builder: Snyder's Shipyard, Dayspring, Nova Scotia
- Launched: April 19, 2000
- Identification: IMO number: 8956425; MMSI number: 316004923
- Status: In service

General characteristics
- Type: Tour boat
- Tonnage: 105 tons
- Length: 65 ft (20 m)
- Beam: 22 ft (6.7 m)
- Draft: 7 ft 3 in (2.21 m)
- Propulsion: 400 hp (300 kW) CAT 3406 turbocharged diesel engine.

Theodore Too is a large-scale imitation tugboat built in Dayspring, Nova Scotia in 2000 based on the fictional television tugboat character Theodore Tugboat. Theodore Too was located in Bedford, Nova Scotia but arrived in Hamilton, Ontario, its new home, on July 18, 2021.

== History ==
Theodore Too was commissioned by Cochran Entertainment, Inc., the now-defunct production company. Andrew Cochran, the creator of Theodore Tugboat, had told his son bedtime stories about the boats in the big harbour and how they interacted with everyone. This later became the basis for the TV series. Theodore became so popular, the company constructed a life-size model of him for marketing and promoting water safety. The boat is unusual, as it is a full-size replica of a scale model. The original model which was used to film the series and inspired Theodore Too can be seen at Halifax, Nova Scotia's Maritime Museum of the Atlantic. Theodore Too was built at Snyder's Shipyard in Dayspring, Nova Scotia and launched on April 19, 2000. After sea trials out of Lunenburg, Nova Scotia, the vessel made its first port call to Halifax on May 6, 2000.

The ocean-going boat made a 50-city tour down the eastern seaboard to Tampa Bay, Florida, and back again through the Great Lakes to Chicago, Illinois. Theodore Too became the Ambassador of the U.S. National Safe Boating Council and mascot to the U.S. Coast Guard, participating in several tall ship events. For most of its time touring the eastern seaboard and Great Lakes, Theodore Too had a full-time three-person crew, headed by Captain Bill Stewart, a 25-year veteran tugboat captain, who also had an additional nine years as a 44-foot (13 m) motor lifeboat coxswain in the Canadian Coast Guard. After Cochran Entertainment went out of business, the boat was purchased by a Halifax tour boat company, Murphys on the Water. The vessel provided tours of Halifax Harbour in the summer months, operating from the Cable Wharf in downtown Halifax. In 2014, Murphy's businesses were purchased by Ambassatours Gray Line, a sale that included the acquisition of Theodore Too.

On July 16, 2020, Ambassatours announced plans to sell Theodore Too. In 2021,Theodore Too was sold to Blair McKeil of McKeil Marine of Burlington, Ontario. The tug was expected to collaborate with Swim Drink Fish, a water education and conservation advocacy group, and promote sustainability and preservation of the Great Lakes. After 21 years, the tug departed the waters off of the Halifax Harbour in early June en route to its new home at the Hamilton Harbour. On July 18, 2021, the tug arrived in Hamilton.

On December 17, 2024, many St. Catharines, Ontario locals noticed that Theodore Too was sitting low in the water, while moored at the Port Weller Dry Docks. Later in the day, others noted that Theodore Too had been mostly submerged. The owner later made an announcement, that the tug had been partially sunk. The boat was subsequently righted and refloated on December 19.

== Specifications ==
Theodore Too greets cruise ship Norwegian Sea at Halifax Harbour, 2003

The boat was designed by Fred Allen and naval architect Marius Lengkeek of Lengkeek Vessel Engineering, and was built by Snyder's Shipyard in Dayspring, Nova Scotia, on the Lahave River, not far from Bridgewater, Nova Scotia.

The hull and wheelhouse are made entirely of wood, with a fibreglass hat and smokestack. It has a 'face' on the wheelhouse, with large realistic hydraulic eyes which are no longer operational. The boat displays a number of prop details such as winches and towing bitts inspired from real tugs but operates as a tour boat, not a real tug boat.

== See also ==
Day Out with Thomas
