= Floating restaurant =

Ship type

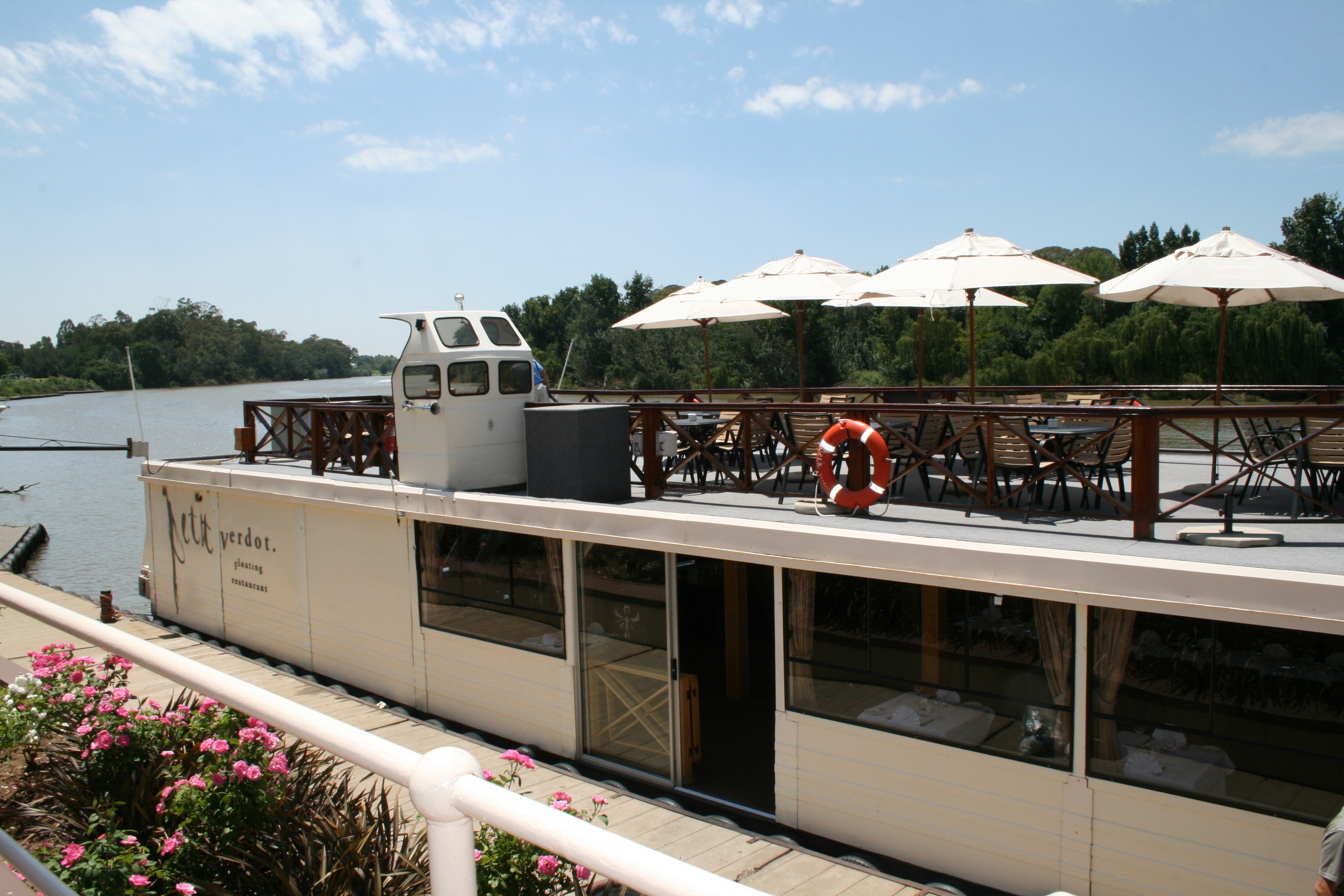
A floating restaurant on the Vaal River at Vereeniging, South Africa

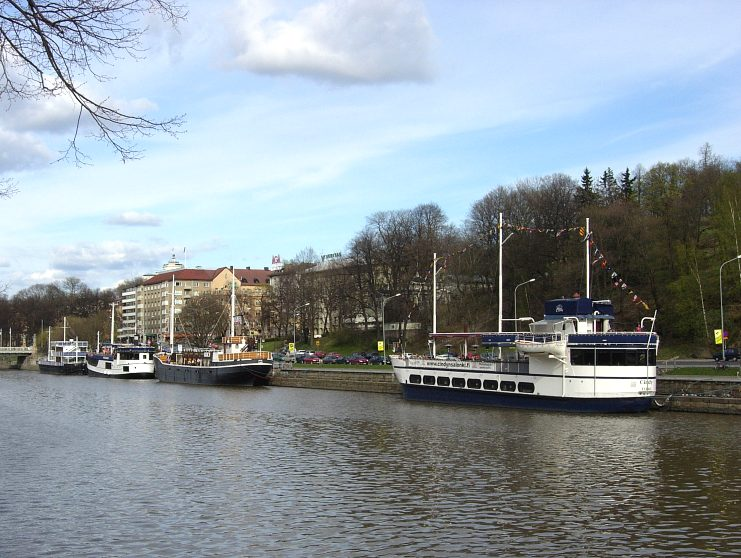
Restaurant ships on the Aura River in Turku

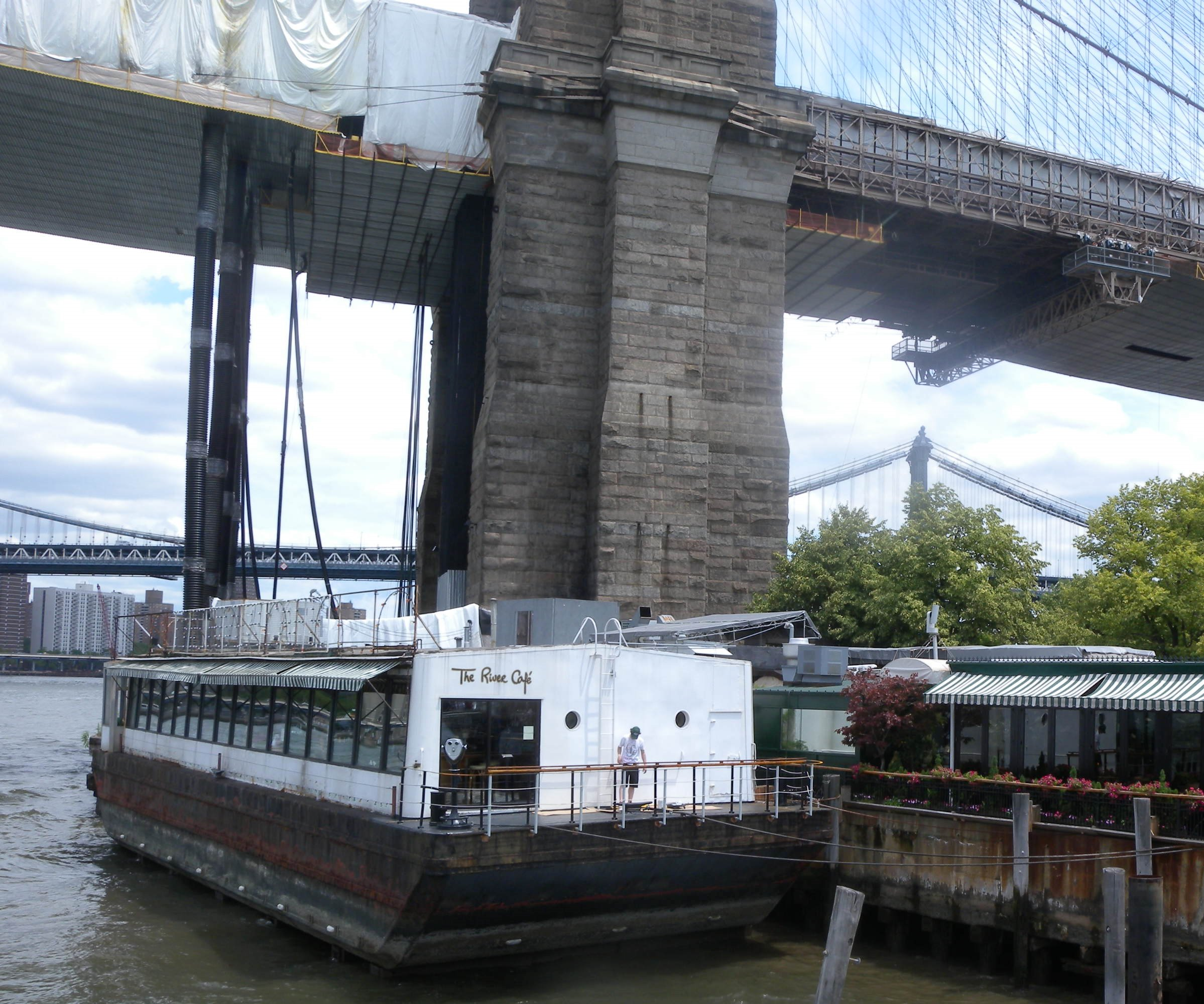
Barge restaurant in Brooklyn, New York

Sea Palace in Amsterdam

A floating restaurant is a vessel, usually a large steel barge or hulk, used as a restaurant on water. The Jumbo Kingdom, formerly located at Aberdeen in Hong Kong, was at one time the world's largest floating restaurant, until it sank at sea in 2022. Sometimes retired ships are given a second lease on life as floating restaurants. The former car ferry New York, built in 1941, serves as DiMillo's in Portland, Maine. Another example is the train ferry Lansdowne, which served as a restaurant in Detroit. Plans for Lansdowne to continue in this capacity on the Buffalo, New York, waterfront came to naught and it was scrapped in the summer of 2008. A third example of a ship's hull converted for this purpose is Captain John's Harbour Boat Restaurant in Toronto, which was located on MS Jadran, a former Yugoslavian ship but has since been closed and scrapped. Normac, the first Captain John's restaurant, was moved to Port Dahousie as the floating cocktail lounge Big Kahuna and is now the Riverboat Mexican Grill.

== Examples ==
- Binghamton (ferryboat) - defunct
- M/B Camaligan
- Captain John's Harbour Boat Restaurant (MS Jadran) - defunct
- Jumbo Kingdom - sank at sea in 2022
- MV Ganga Vihar
- Katarina, on the Aura River at Turku in Finland using the 1869-built Swedish steamship Fredriksborg
- PS Lincoln Castle - defunct
- McBarge - derelict
- Moshulu
- MS Normac (the original Captain John's restaurant in Toronto, now the Riverboat Mexican Grill in Port Dalhousie, Ontario)
- Pilot - owned by the Pincus Brothers, sank in New York Harbor in 2026
- TS Queen Mary
- Rustar dhow
- Sea Palace Restaurant, a 900-seat Chinese restaurant in Amsterdam
- Sherman - defunct
- Sherman Zwicker - owned by the Pincus brothers
- Shun Kee Typhoon Shelter Seafood in New Causeway Bay Typhoon Shelter, Victoria City
- SS South Steyne
- Star Seafood Floating Restaurant
- MV Sydney 2000
- PS Tattershall Castle
- Victory Chimes - owned by the Pincus Brothers, sank in New York Harbor in 2026

== See also ==
- Houseboat
- Kettuvallam – a type of houseboat in Kerala, India, many of which serve as hotels for tourists, with cooking on board
- Revolving restaurant
- Yakatabune – Japan
