= Sherman Zwicker =

1942 schooner

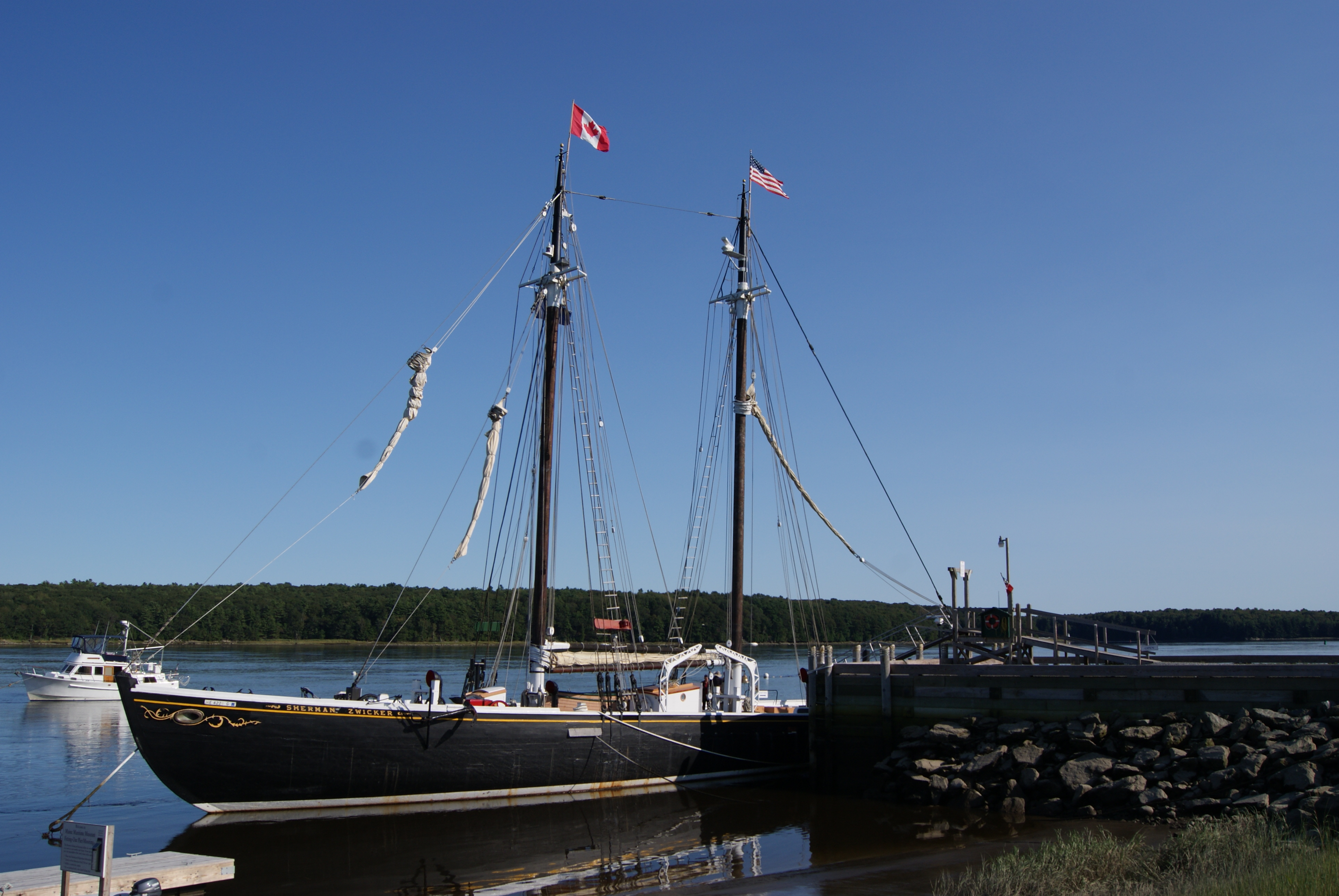
- At the Maine Maritime Museum waterfront, September 2013

History
- Owner: F. Homer Zwicker (1942–1959); Maxwell and James Burry (1959-1968); George McEvoy (1968–2014); Pincus Brothers (2014-)
- Builder: Smith and Rhuland
- Yard number: 190
- Launched: 1942
- Status: Floating restaurant and museum ship

General characteristics
- Tonnage: 180 GT
- Length: 142 ft (43 m)
- Propulsion: 320 bhp (240 kW) diesel engine
- Sail plan: schooner

Sherman Zwicker is a wooden auxiliary fishing schooner built in 1942 at the Smith and Rhuland shipyard, Lunenburg, Nova Scotia. Influenced by the design of the famous Bluenose, Sherman Zwicker was built to fish the Grand Banks. The schooner was built for F. Homer Zwicker of Zwicker and Co. Officially christened in 1942, the F/V Sherman Zwicker was the last operable saltbank fishing vessel in existence until it was turned into a floating restaurant in 2014.

== Description ==
Sherman Zwicker is a 142 feet (43 m) wooden auxiliary fishing schooner. She was designed with a schooner hull similar to her famous sister ship Bluenose, but with a 320 brake horsepower (240 kW) diesel engine installed from the beginning. Both Sherman Zwicker and Bluenose were built at the same shipyard. Sherman Zwicker was built as a knockabout schooner, meaning she does not have a bowsprit, and she was also built without topmasts. She was built strictly as a working fishing vessel and did not race like Bluenose. In her heyday, she was part of a fleet of hundreds of wooden schooners that fished the abundant but turbulent Grand Banks region of the North Atlantic.

== History ==
Owned by Zwicker and Co., Sherman Zwicker was built to fish the Grand Banks of Newfoundland from dories from the ports of Lunenburg, Nova Scotia. When it became too difficult to fill all 11 dories with crew, she was sold to Captains Maxwell and James Burry, a father and son. It fished from the port of Glovertown, Newfoundland from 1959 to 1968. In 1959 she fished eight dories with a crew of 18, all from Newfoundland. Before ice and refrigeration were commercially feasible, these schooners would salt their fish to preserve them. In the 1950s and 1960s fishing trawlers were being built and became more lucrative. The number of Grand Banks schooners greatly declined from approximately a hundred to only fifteen still fishing. In 1963 the political upheaval in Haiti cut off one of the main salt fish markets and this left a huge decrease in the sales for salt fish.

Sherman Zwicker was then sold to George McEvoy of Maine in 1968. His plan was to restore her to her original condition. From 1968 through 2014 she was a fully operational traveling museum ship that visited the Maine Maritime Museum in Bath, Maine, participated in tall ship festivities along the eastern seaboard, and visited her original home port in Nova Scotia and Newfoundland. In 2014 she was sold to the Pincus Brothers, who operate several restaurant ships, including the schooners Pilot and Victory Chimes until both of their sinkings in 2026. The Pincus brothers brought her to New York City, where she operates as a restaurant ship hosting a seasonal oyster bar and seafood restaurant called "Grand Banks". She is currently docked at Hudson River Park's Pier 25 (40.72030°N 74.01607°W).

== Design ==
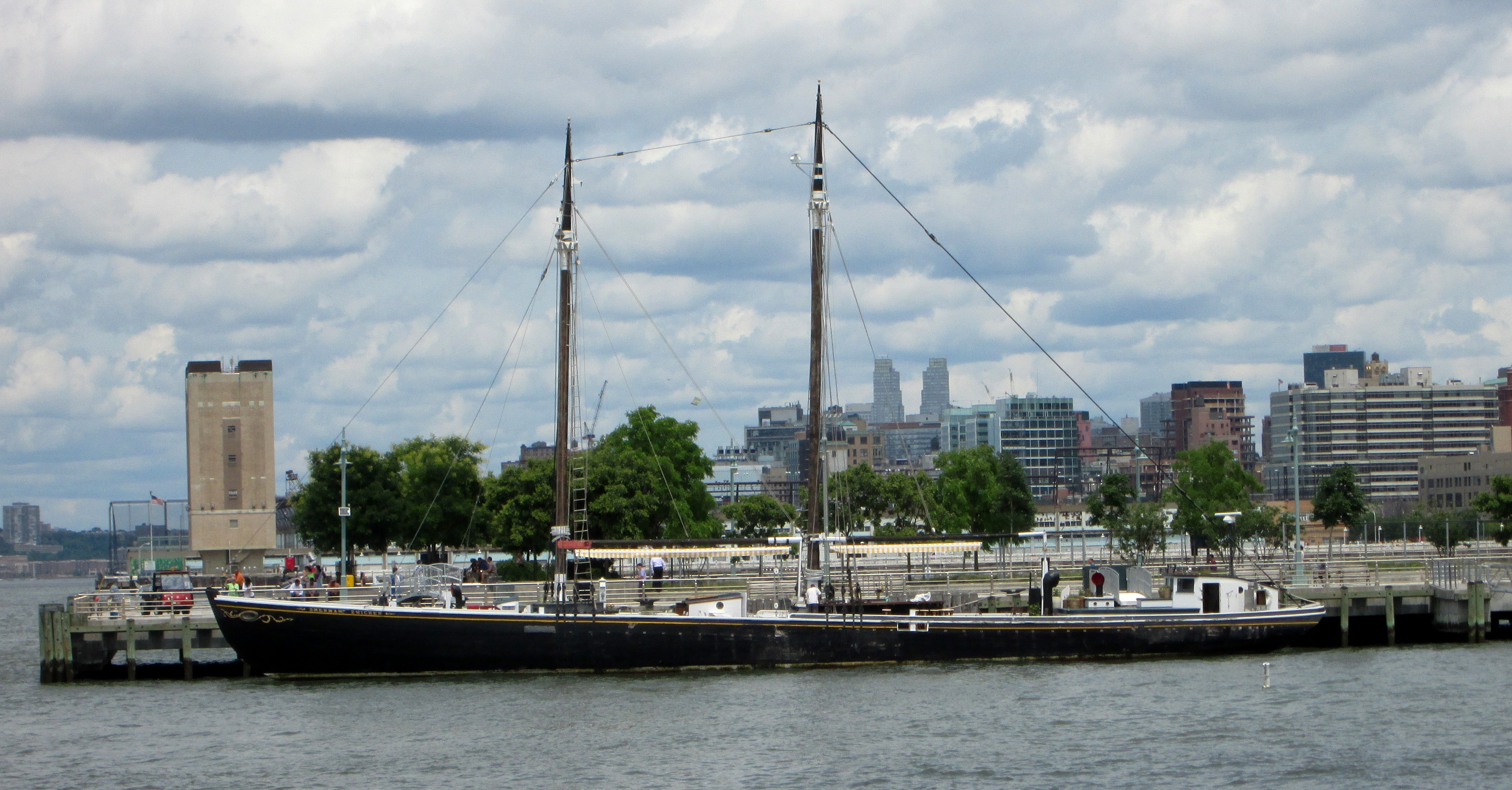
A boat, the Sherman Zwicker, is tied up alongside Pier 25 on the Hudson River in the Tribeca neighborhood of Manhattan, New York City, as seen from the North Esplanade of Battery Park City. In the background is a ventilation building for the Holland Tunnel.

Designed by William James Roué, the Sherman Zwicker is a nearly identical twin of Roué's most famous hull, the Bluenose – widely considered the fastest racing schooner ever built. While the Bluenose split her time between racing and fishing, the Sherman Zwicker's true purpose was to prolong the working life of the saltbank fleet; therefore, slight modifications were made to her rigging and propulsion to increase efficiency. This left her with the sleek purpose built racing hull of Bluenose, paired with a substantial Fairbanks Morse diesel engine, and a more compact, easier to tend rig. At the time she was a considered a modern transition vessel (vessels transitioning from sails to diesel power), and as such was one of the first and last of a kind. Her keel was laid at the renowned Smith and Rhuland Shipyard in Lunenburg, Nova Scotia where she was built by hand using heavy timbers of old growth Canadian elm. She was indeed the last of a fleet of hundreds of large wooden schooners fishing the Grand Banks and moving cargoes of fish and salt in the North Atlantic to South America.

== Gallery ==
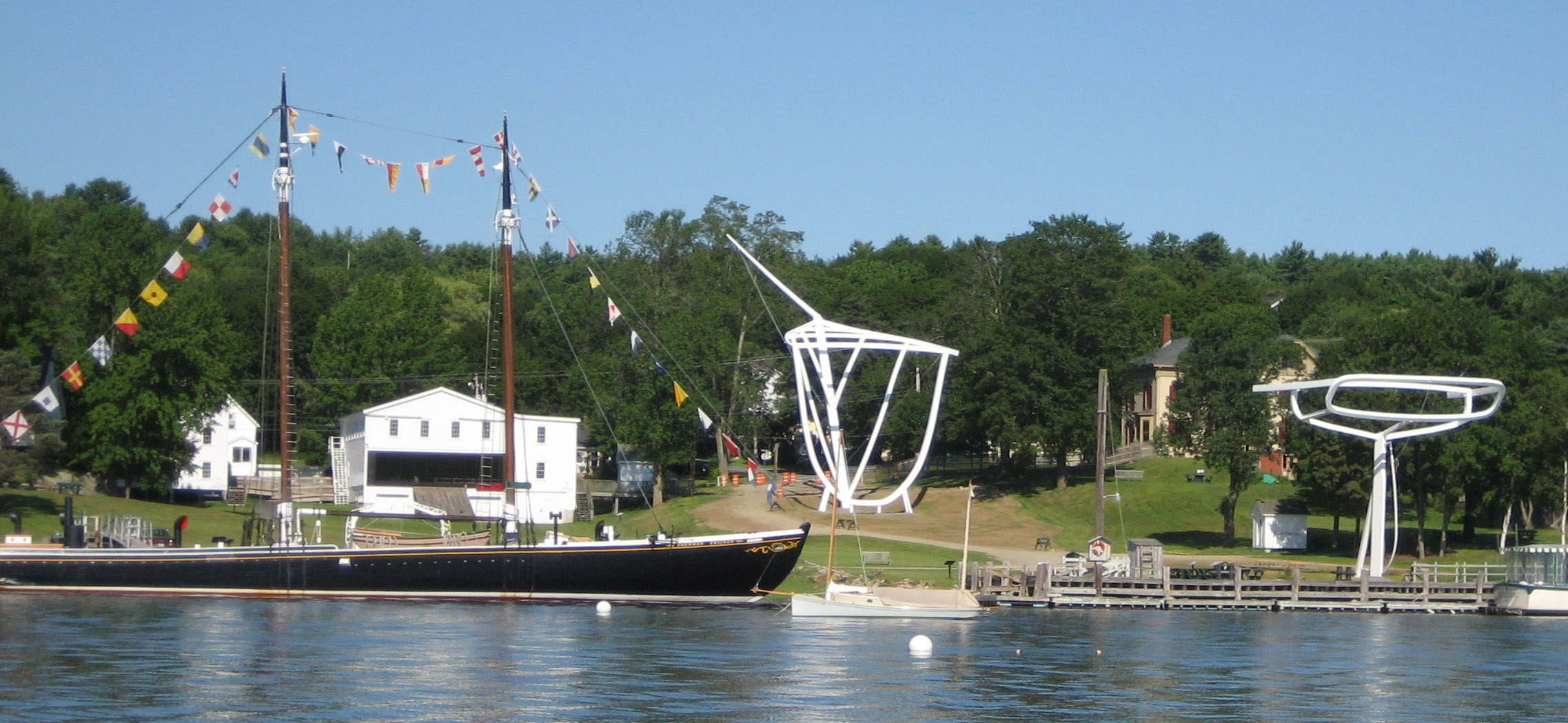
Sherman Zwicker (left), and a sculpture representing Wyoming, at the Maine Maritime Museum in Bath, Maine

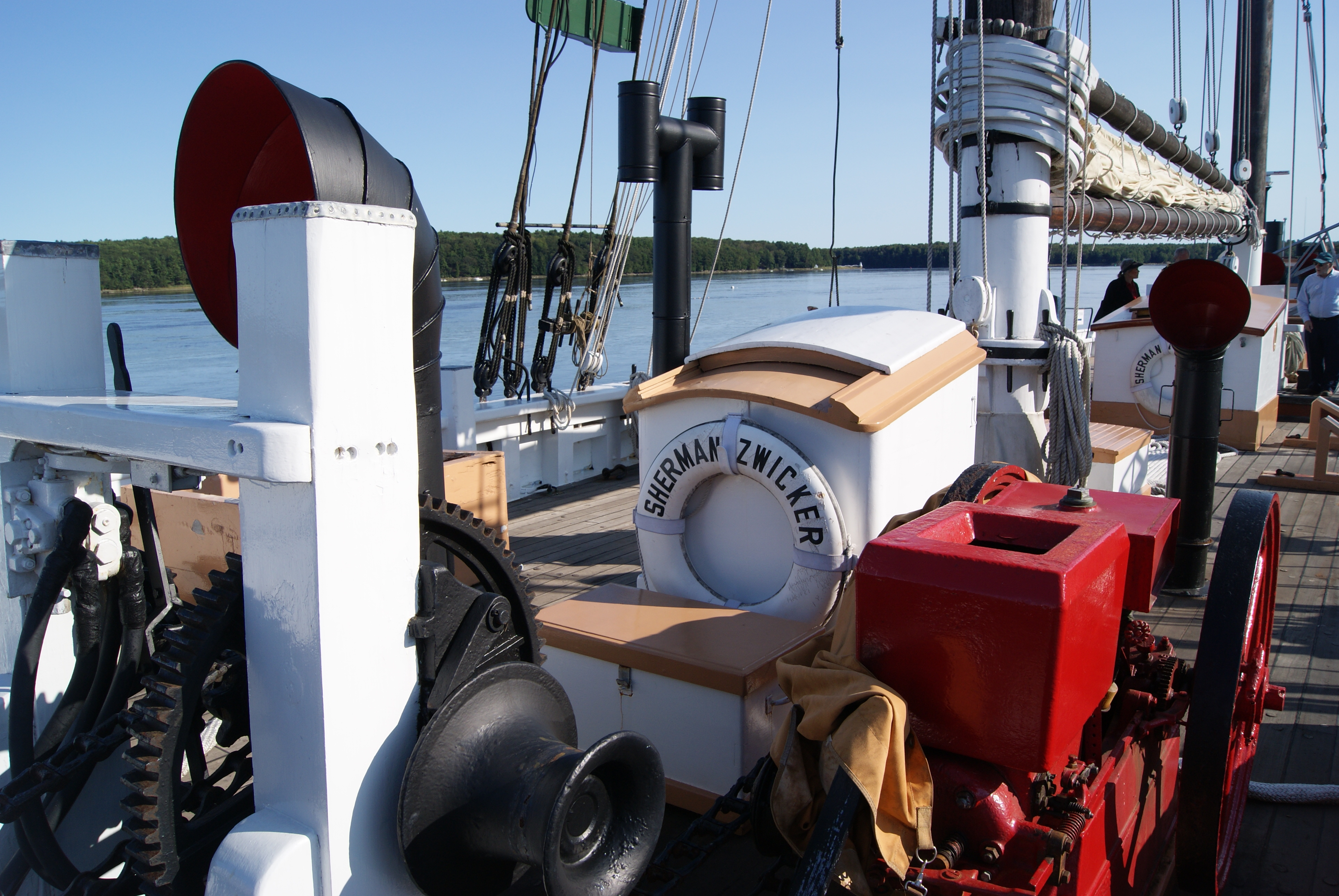
Sherman Zwicker, a wooden auxiliary schooner moored at the Maine Maritime Museum in Bath, Maine, USA

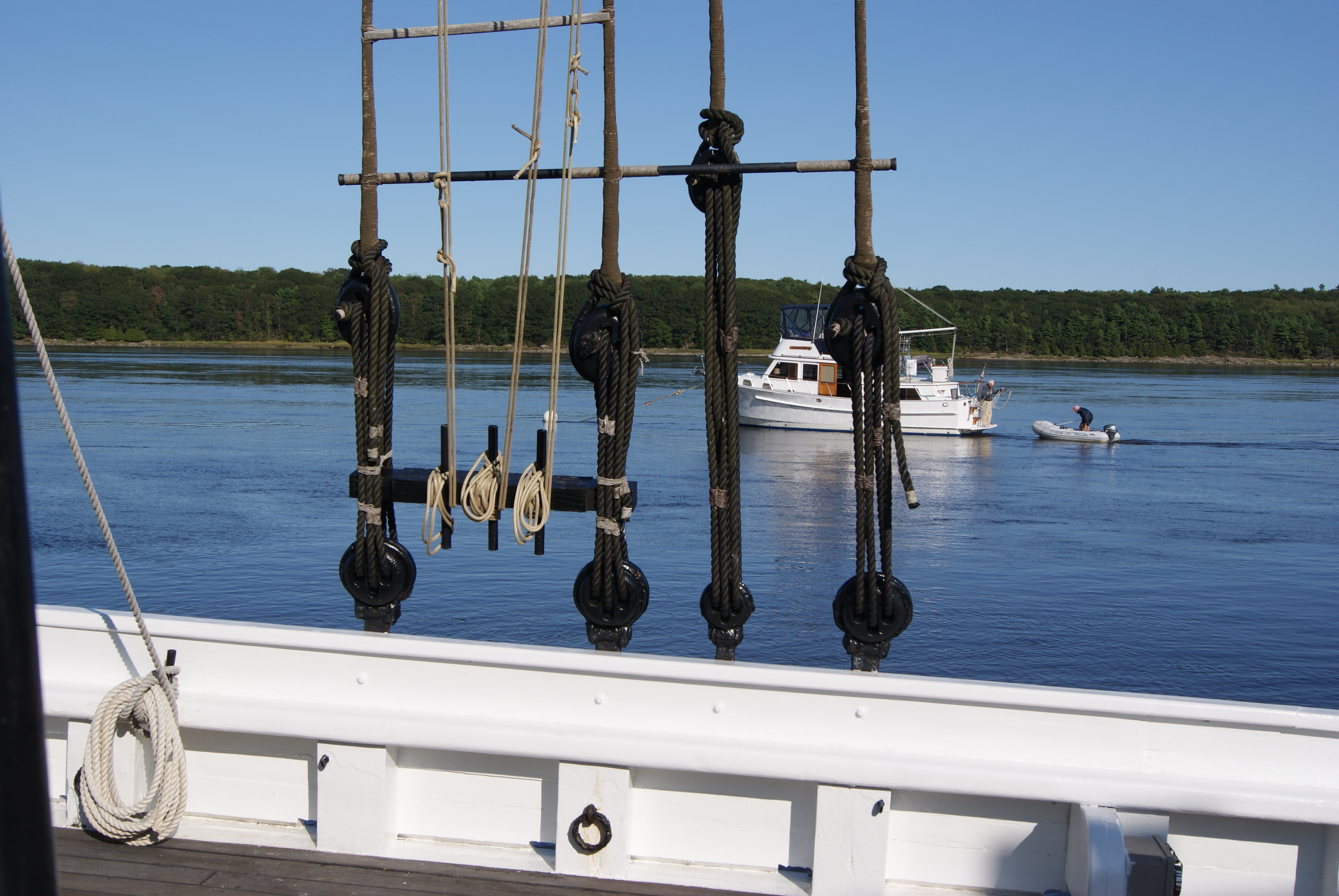
Sherman Zwicker, a wooden auxiliary schooner moored at the Maine Maritime Museum in Bath, Maine, USA

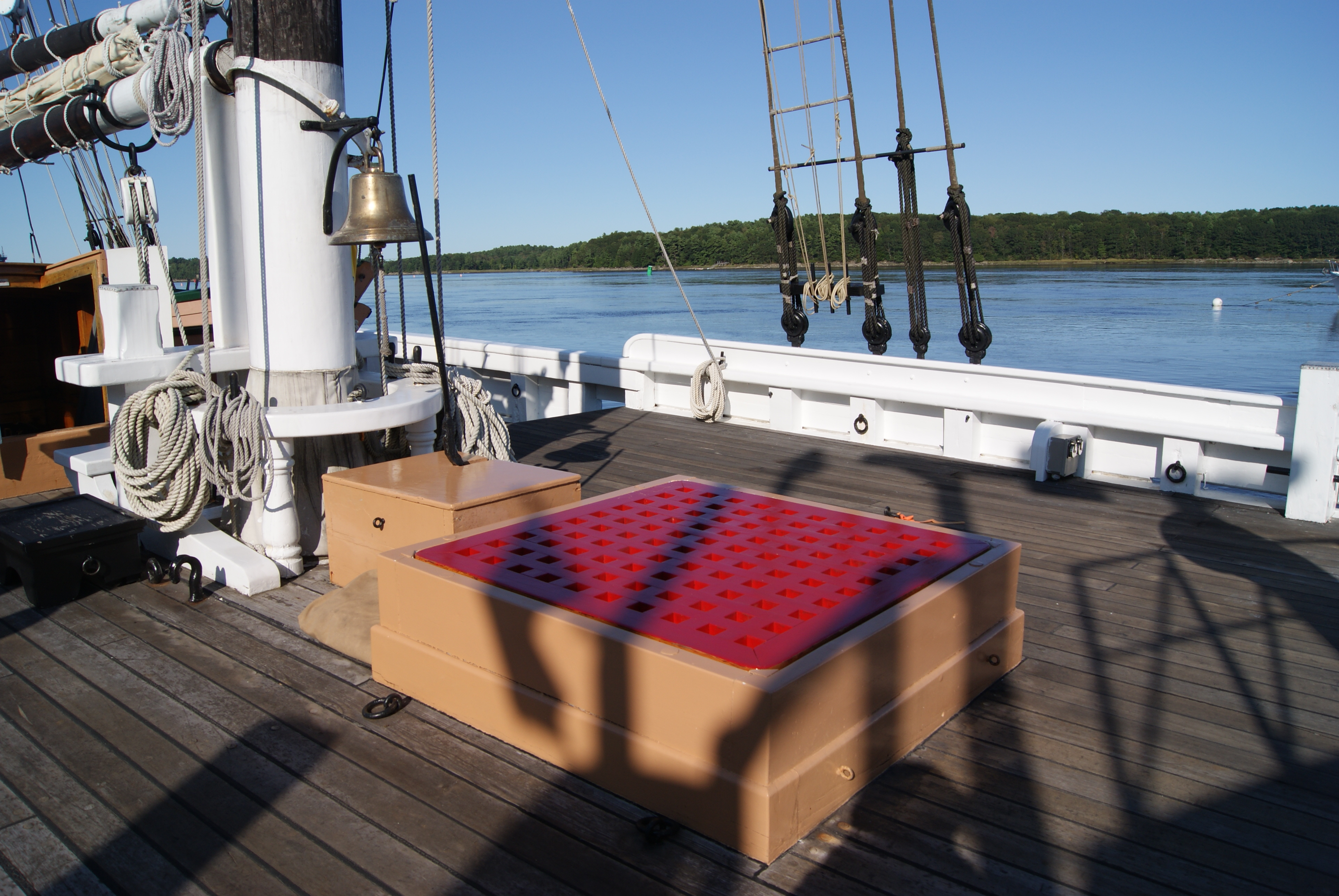
Sherman Zwicker, a wooden auxiliary schooner moored at the Maine Maritime Museum in Bath, Maine, USA

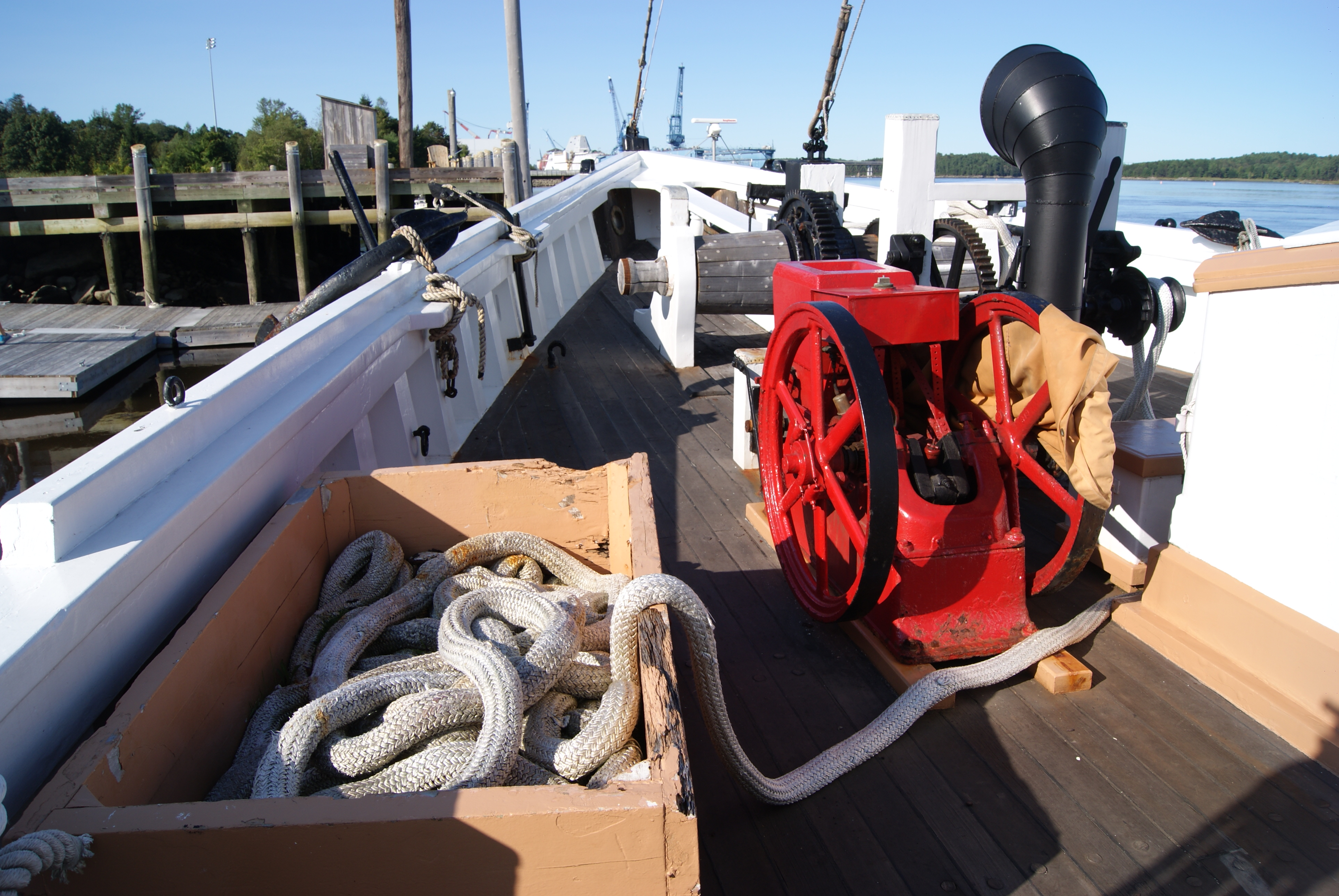
Sherman Zwicker, a wooden auxiliary schooner moored at the Maine Maritime Museum in Bath, Maine, USA

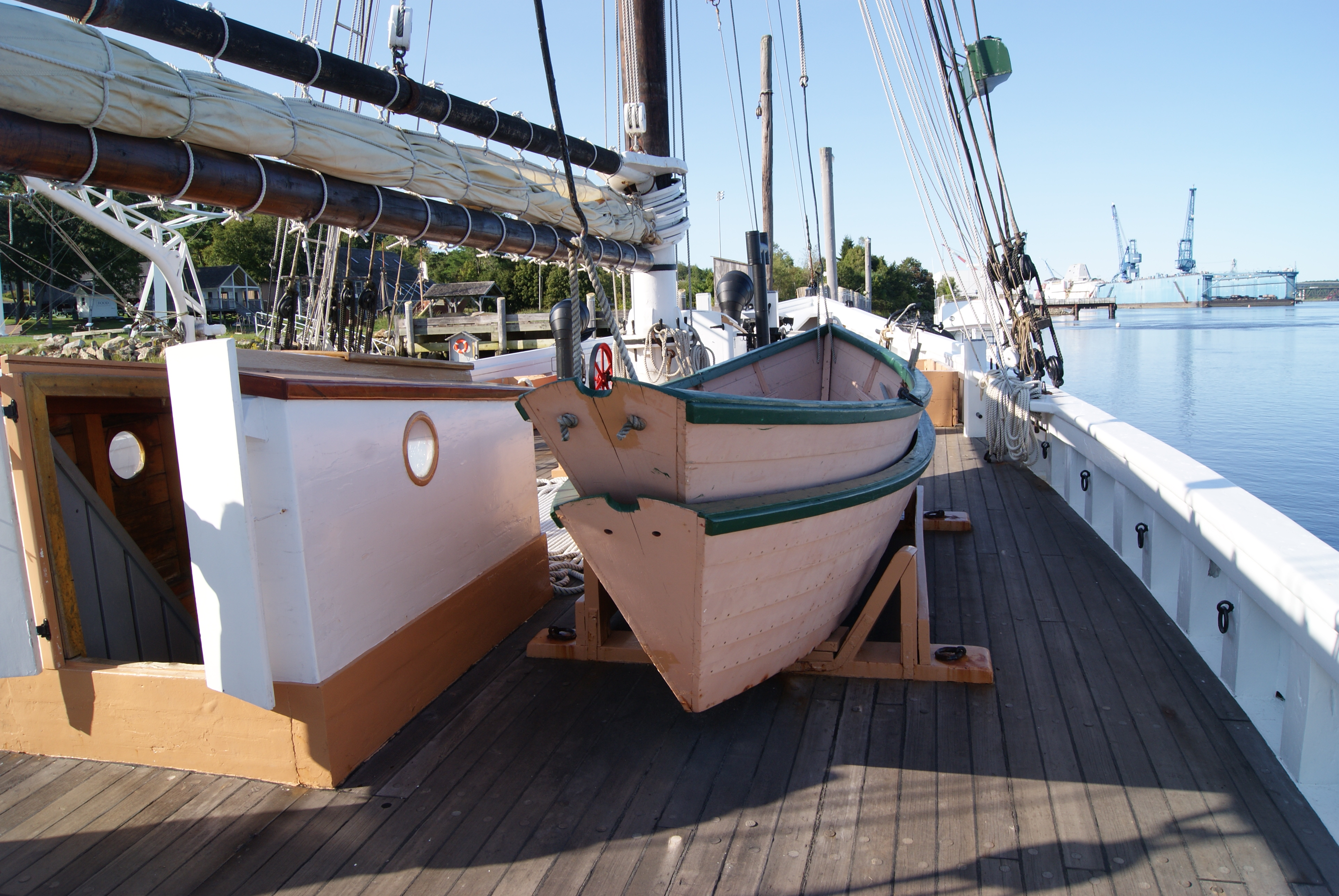
Dories on the deck of Sherman Zwicker, a wooden auxiliary schooner moored at the Maine Maritime Museum in Bath, Maine, USA
