= Bounty (1960 ship) =

1960 reconstruction of HMS Bounty

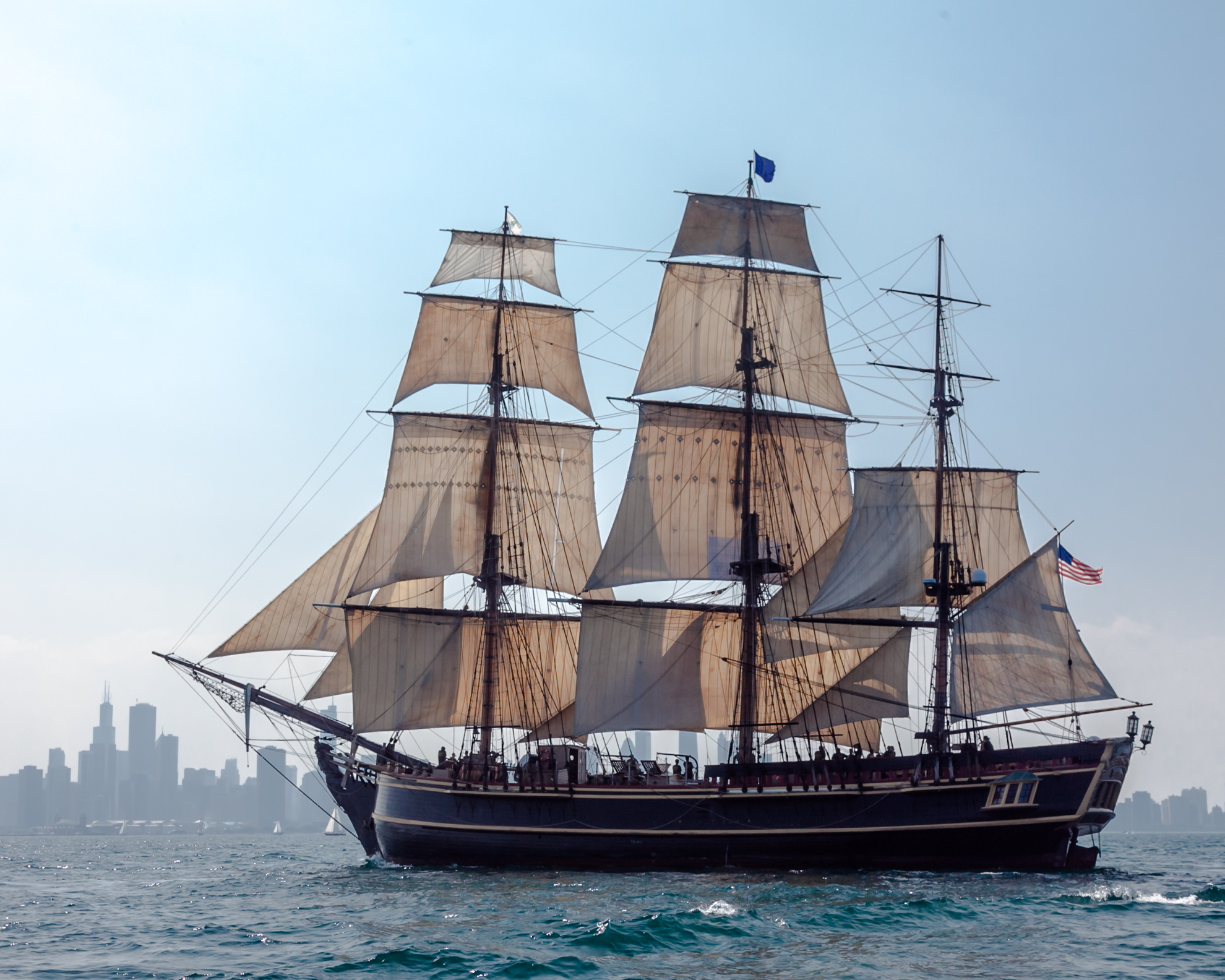
- Bounty on Lake Michigan off Chicago, 2010

History

United States
- Owner: HMS Bounty Organization LLC
- Builder: Smith and Rhuland Ltd, Lunenburg, Nova Scotia
- Launched: 1960
- Home port: Greenport, Suffolk County, New York, United States
- Identification: Call sign: WDD9114; MMSI number: 369191000
- Fate: Sunk off the coast of North Carolina during Hurricane Sandy on 29 October 2012

General characteristics
- Tonnage: 409 GT; 181 NT
- Length: 180 ft (54.9 m) sparred; 120 ft (37 m) on deck
- Beam: 31.6 ft (9.6 m)
- Height: 111 ft (33.8 m)
- Draft: 13 ft (4.0 m)
- Depth: 21.3 ft (6.5 m)
- Installed power: 2 × John Deere 375 hp (280 kW) diesel engines
- Sail plan: Full-rigged ship, sail area 10,000 ft^{2} (929 m^{2})
- Crew: 12–14

Bounty was an enlarged reconstruction of the original 1787 Royal Navy sailing ship HMS Bounty, built in Lunenburg, Nova Scotia, in 1960. She sank off the coast of North Carolina during Hurricane Sandy on October 29, 2012.

The tall ship was often referred to as HMS Bounty, but was not entitled to the use of the prefix "HMS" as she was not commissioned into the Royal Navy. Here "HMS" is treated as part of the popular name, and not as a ship prefix.

== History ==
=== Metro-Goldwyn-Mayer ===
Bounty was commissioned by the Metro-Goldwyn-Mayer film studio for the 1962 film Mutiny on the Bounty. She was the first large vessel built from scratch for a film using historical sources. Previous film vessels were fanciful conversions of existing vessels. Bounty was built to extrapolated original ship's drawings from files in the British Admiralty archives, and in the traditional manner by more than 200 workers over an 8-month period at the Smith and Rhuland shipyard in Lunenburg, Nova Scotia. To assist film-making and carry production staff, her general dimensions were greatly increased resulting in a vessel nearly twice the tonnage of the original. While built primarily for film use, she was fully equipped for sailing because of the requirement to move her a great distance to the filming location. Two other well known reproductions were built at the yard subsequent to Bounty; Bluenose II and HMS Rose.

Bounty was launched on 27 August 1960. Crewed by Lunenburg fishermen and film staff, the vessel sailed via the Panama Canal to Tahiti for filming. Bounty was scheduled to be burned at the end of the film, but actor Marlon Brando protested, so MGM kept the vessel. After filming and a worldwide promotional tour, the ship was berthed in St. Petersburg, Florida, on June 19, 1965 as a permanent tourist attraction, where she stayed until the mid-1980s.

The ship was also featured in an episode of Flipper titled "Flipper and the Bounty", which aired 11 December 1965.

The ship was featured in the 1983 film Yellowbeard, a comedy about pirates starring Graham Chapman, Peter Boyle and many other comedic stars, including Marty Feldman in his final role before suffering a heart attack during production.

In 1986, Ted Turner acquired the MGM film library and Bounty with it. The ship was used for promotion and entertainment, and was used during the filming of Treasure Island with Charlton Heston and Christian Bale in 1989.

=== Fall River, Massachusetts ===
In 1993, Turner donated the ship to the Fall River Chamber Foundation, Inc, which established the Tall Ship Bounty Foundation, Inc to operate the ship for educational "adventures" as well as a tourist attraction and celebrity promoter of Fall River, Massachusetts. Bounty summered in New England waters operating out of the Fall River Heritage State Park facilities and wintered in Florida operating out of the St. Petersburg Pier.

The ship was booked to appear in several feature films in the mid-1990s, such as a remake of the 1935 film Captain Blood which starred Errol Flynn, and a film about Anne Bonny, an 18th-century female pirate. Both projects were shelved before production began. The ship was set to appear in the 1997 Steven Spielberg film Amistad, but before her scenes were shot in Newport, Rhode Island, filming of the slave ship rebellion at the beginning of the film was moved to Puerto Rico and California. However, the ship did appear in several documentaries during her eight-year stay in Fall River.

In the mid-1990s, Marlon Brando, star of the 1962 version of Mutiny on the Bounty, showed interest in using the ship for a project in the area of his island in the South Pacific. However, he was surprised at what it cost to operate a ship with a crew on a weekly basis, and he passed on the idea.

While under ownership of the Tall Ship Bounty Foundation, the ship went into dry-dock twice and had major improvements to the ship's ribs and planks. During the second dry docking, Captain Robin Walbridge decided to permanently remove the copper cladding and in its place applied marine anti-fouling paint to repel the insects that bore into the wood. Due to lack of commitment to long term funding by the private and public sectors, the trustees of the Tall Ship Bounty Foundation, Inc. determined it was time to put the ship up for sale. Due to cash flow problems all the crew's contracts were terminated and volunteers kept a watch over Bounty at its dock at Fall River Heritage State Park. On 15 March 2001, the ship was sold to the HMS Bounty Foundation.

In 2005, while moored in St. Petersburg, Bounty was the shooting location of the "pornographic action-adventure" film Pirates.

=== Restoration and films ===
The ship's declining condition caused the vessel to temporarily lose her Coast Guard certificate of Inspection, but Bounty was restored. The vessel's bottom planking was replaced and repaired as required at the Boothbay Harbor Shipyard in Maine in 2002. Moored in her winter home in St. Petersburg, she again became available for charter, excursions, sail-training, and movies including The SpongeBob SquarePants Movie. In 2004 she left Florida for her season in the Great Lakes, but stopped in Lunenburg at the shipyard where she was built where the stem was replaced along with other more routine maintenance. At the end of that season she stopped at Oswego, New York, where the entire rig, masts and all were removed and shipped to Scarano Shipyard in Albany. Bounty followed by way of the New York State Canal System, becoming the largest vessel to transit the canal system. On arrival in Albany, the work of renovating, updating and re-installing the rig was undertaken. The next maintenance/upgrade period occurred in Bayou La Batre, Alabama. This was to prepare the ship for her next role in Pirates of the Caribbean: Dead Man's Chest. Along with changes to the superstructure, the color of the ship's hull was changed from ocean-blue to black and dark green, later to be returned to her original blue and yellow.

In June 2005 the production company Digital Playground rented the Bounty to film the non-pornography related segments of the adult movie Pirates under the pretence they were filming a PG-13 movie. The filming took place while the Bounty was docked at the former St. Petersburg Pier.

In April 2006, Bounty returned to Boothbay Harbor for further refit including repairs to her forward sections and decks. Following this work, Bounty was scheduled to repeat the famous voyage of the original Bounty. During the 2006 refit, the ship was virtually rebuilt to make her appearance more similar to that of the original HMS Bounty, and make her more suitable for service as a sail training vessel. Her lower decks were cleared of most of their 18th-century-style furnishings and living spaces, including the great cabin, galley, and officers quarters.

=== List of film appearances ===
- Mutiny on the Bounty (1962)
- Flipper – one episode "Flipper and the Bounty" (December 11, 1965)
- Yellowbeard (1983)
- Treasure Island (1990)
- The SpongeBob SquarePants Movie (2004)
- Pirates (2005)
- Pirates of the Caribbean: Dead Man's Chest (2006)

=== Post-restoration and sale attempt ===
In August 2007, Bounty had just completed a US$3 million restoration and was making a seven-week UK tour prior to embarking on a world tour via South Africa and New Zealand to Pitcairn (home to the original Bounty descendants) and Tahiti. The UK ports tour included a visit to Maryport, Cumbria, the birthplace of mutiny leader Fletcher Christian. The Bounty was moored in Port of Málaga, Spain, on 1 November 2007.

Bounty's owners had offered her for sale since 2010. The ship was for sale as of 2012 for US$4.6 million. In winter of 2012, the ship was in San Juan, Puerto Rico. She took part in the Tall Ships gatherings 2012, and was in Halifax, Nova Scotia, in July 2012. On 12 August she was docked at Belfast, Maine. On 3 September, Bounty sailed from Gloucester, Massachusetts, to Eastport, Maine. After a stop at Maine Maritime Academy in Castine, she pulled into Boothbay Harbor, Maine for dry dock and maintenance. She was relaunched from the Boothbay Harbor Shipyard on 17 October 2012. Bounty left Boothbay bound for New York City early 21 October 2012.

== Loss in Hurricane Sandy ==
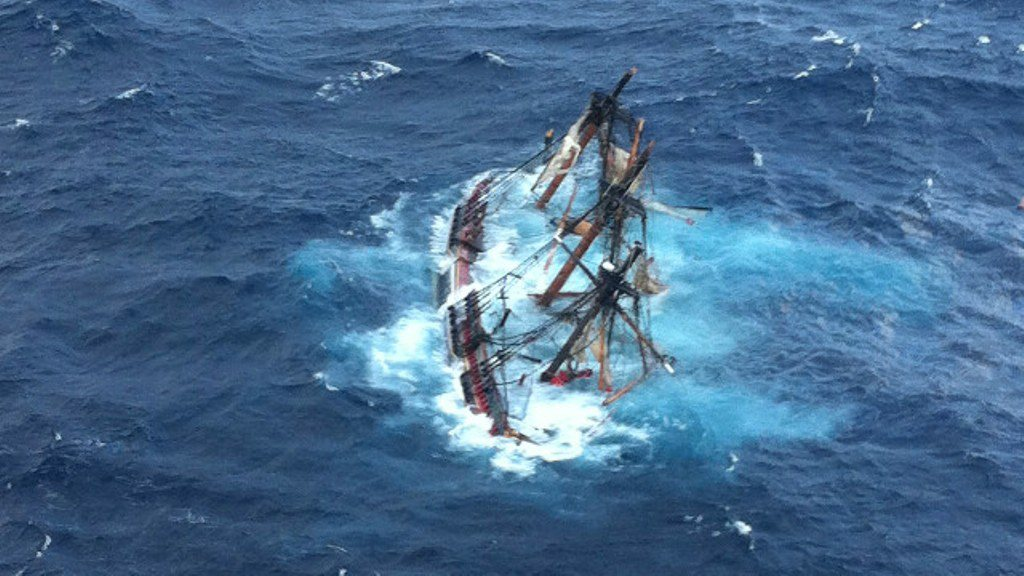
Bounty with decks awash in the Atlantic Ocean during Hurricane Sandy shortly before sinking approximately 90 miles (145 km) southeast of Hatteras, North Carolina, Oct. 29, 2012

On October 25, 2012, the vessel left New London, Connecticut, heading for St. Petersburg, Florida, initially going on an easterly course to avoid Hurricane Sandy.

The initial request for Coast Guard assistance was sent in an email by the captain to the vessel's organization. At about 8:45 pm EDT, the organization relayed the request to Coast Guard Sector North Carolina about Bounty's situation. Shortly thereafter, the Bounty crew activated one of Bounty's EPIRB beacons. Walbridge had reported the ship was taking on water, and the crew was preparing to abandon ship. Afterwards Bounty lost electrical power due to water flooding the starboard generator.

This information was sent to a Coast Guard HC-130 rescue airplane crew that was stationed in North Carolina at Raleigh-Durham Airport. The ship's location was given as roughly 90 miles (145 km) southeast of the Outer Banks in the vicinity of a feature on the ocean floor known as the Hatteras Canyon. The HC-130 rescue plane underwent equipment outages on its rescue flight, including its anti-icing system and its weather radar. This caused pilot Lieutenant Wes McIntosh and co-pilot Mike Myers to conduct the search at approximately 500 feet (150 m) AMSL in an attempt to locate the vessel visually, around midnight and with poor visibility. Shortly after midnight on October 29, the stricken vessel was discovered.

The USCG aircraft made radio contact with John Svendsen, Bounty's first mate, as the HC-130 circled the ship in the early morning hours. Bounty was listing at about a 45-degree angle on its starboard side. The HC-130 crew radioed instructions to Bounty, and the plane circled for hours while preparations were made. Meanwhile, helicopter crews from Coast Guard Air Station Elizabeth City were instructed to prepare for a very difficult rescue operation. At 4:45 am, Svendsen radioed to the HC-130 that the ship was sinking and the crew needed immediate assistance. McIntosh flew the plane lower and readied his crew to drop life rafts and supplies. With the plane short on fuel, the HC-130 dropped life rafts but had to leave the vessel and crew on their own in rough seas and 50-knot (93 km/h; 58 mph) winds. It was more than an hour before the first MH-60 Jayhawk helicopter arrived on the scene to begin the dangerous rescue attempt around dawn. One member of the Coast Guard crew received major injuries during the rescue.

Vice Admiral Robert C. Parker, USCG, reported the ship had sunk and 14 people had been rescued from life rafts by two rescue helicopters. The storm had washed the captain and two crew overboard; one of the crew had made it to a life raft, but the other two were missing. They wore orange survival suits complete with strobe lights; thus rescuers had some hope of finding them alive. Claudene Christian, one of the two missing crew members, was found by the Coast Guard. She was unresponsive, and later pronounced dead at a hospital.

The last missing person was long-time captain Robin Walbridge. He was raised in Montpelier, Vermont, and later moved to St. Petersburg, Florida. He was a field mechanic on houseboats who worked his way up to obtaining a 1600-ton license in 1995, when he began working as a Bounty crew member. Search efforts for Walbridge continued over an area of 12,000 square nautical miles (41,000 km^{2}; 16,000 sq mi) until they were suspended on 1 November 2012.

A formal investigation into the sinking was ordered by USCG Rear Admiral Steven Ratti on November 2, 2012. An inquiry into the sinking was held in Portsmouth, Virginia, between February 12 and 20, 2013, at which it was concluded that Captain Walbridge's decision to sail the ship into the path of Hurricane Sandy was the cause, and the inquiry found this to have been a "reckless decision". It was also found that the "leading cause that contributed to the loss" of life was the captain's "decision to order the crew to abandon the ship much too late". The loss of the ship prompted the USCG to conduct a review of the events and decisions leading to the loss of the ship.

== Lawsuits ==
In May 2013, family members of Claudene Christian filed a $90 million civil lawsuit against the ship owners, alleging unseaworthiness and negligence. The suit was settled out of court for an undisclosed sum.

The boat's insurer, Acadia Insurance Company, sued HMS Bounty Organization, LLC and Robert Hansen in November 2014 for return of insurance proceed paid out under the relevant policies, alleging unseaworthiness, violation of good faith and other matters. On April 11, 2022, the Eastern District of New York ruled in favor of defendants, holding the insurer had failed to prove its claims.

== Gallery ==
Bounty
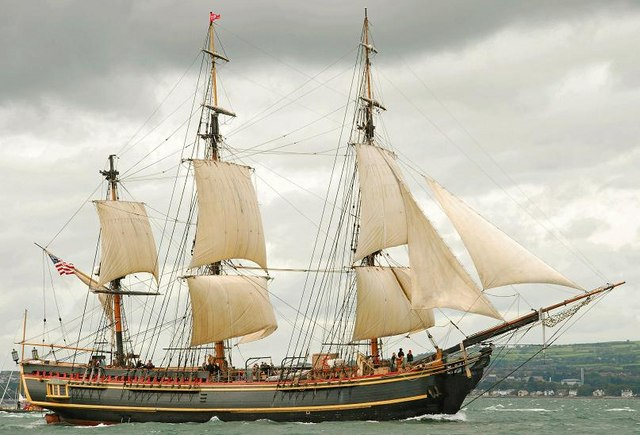
Bounty in Belfast Lough

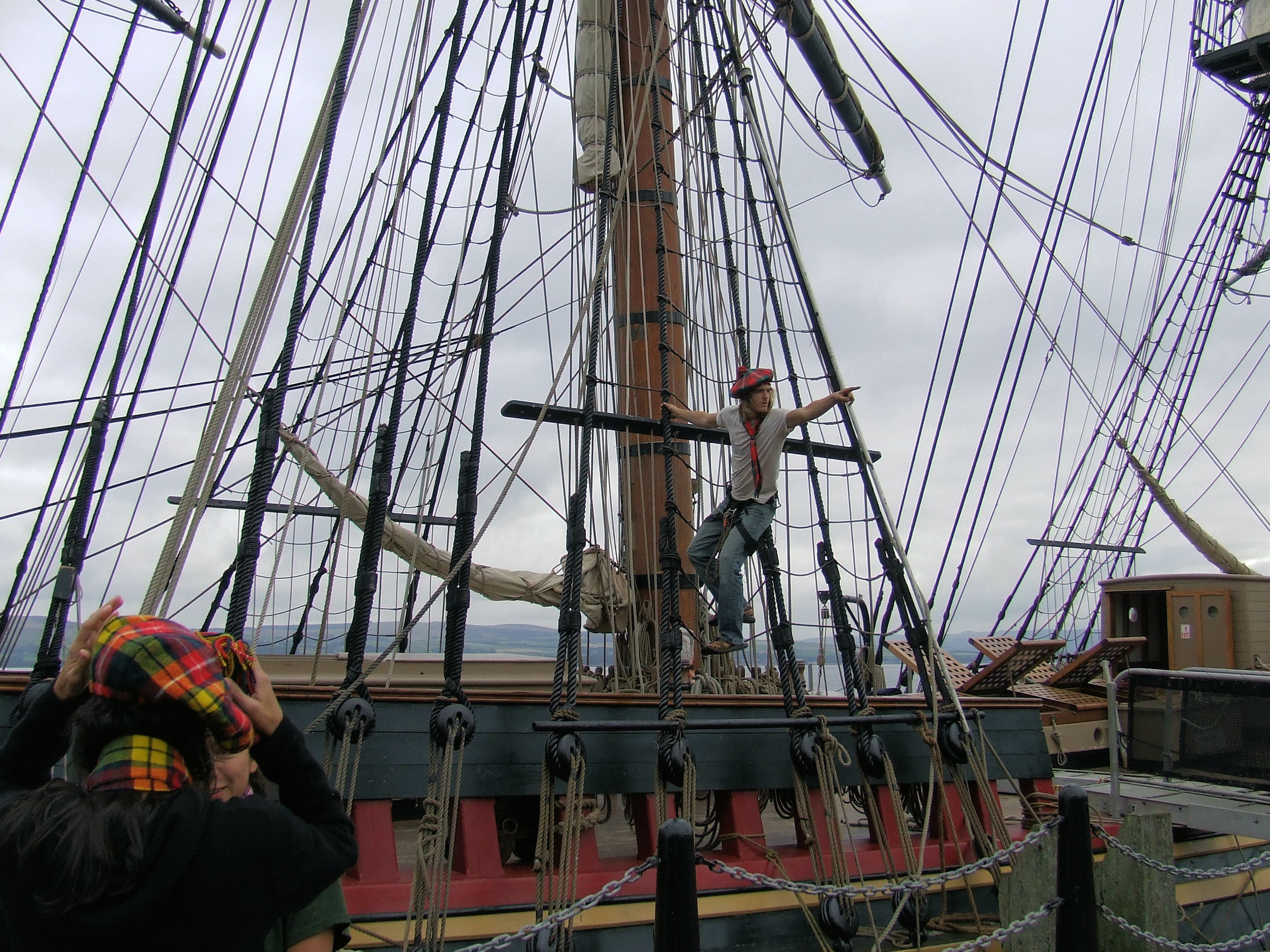
Bounty's crew in Greenock, Scotland

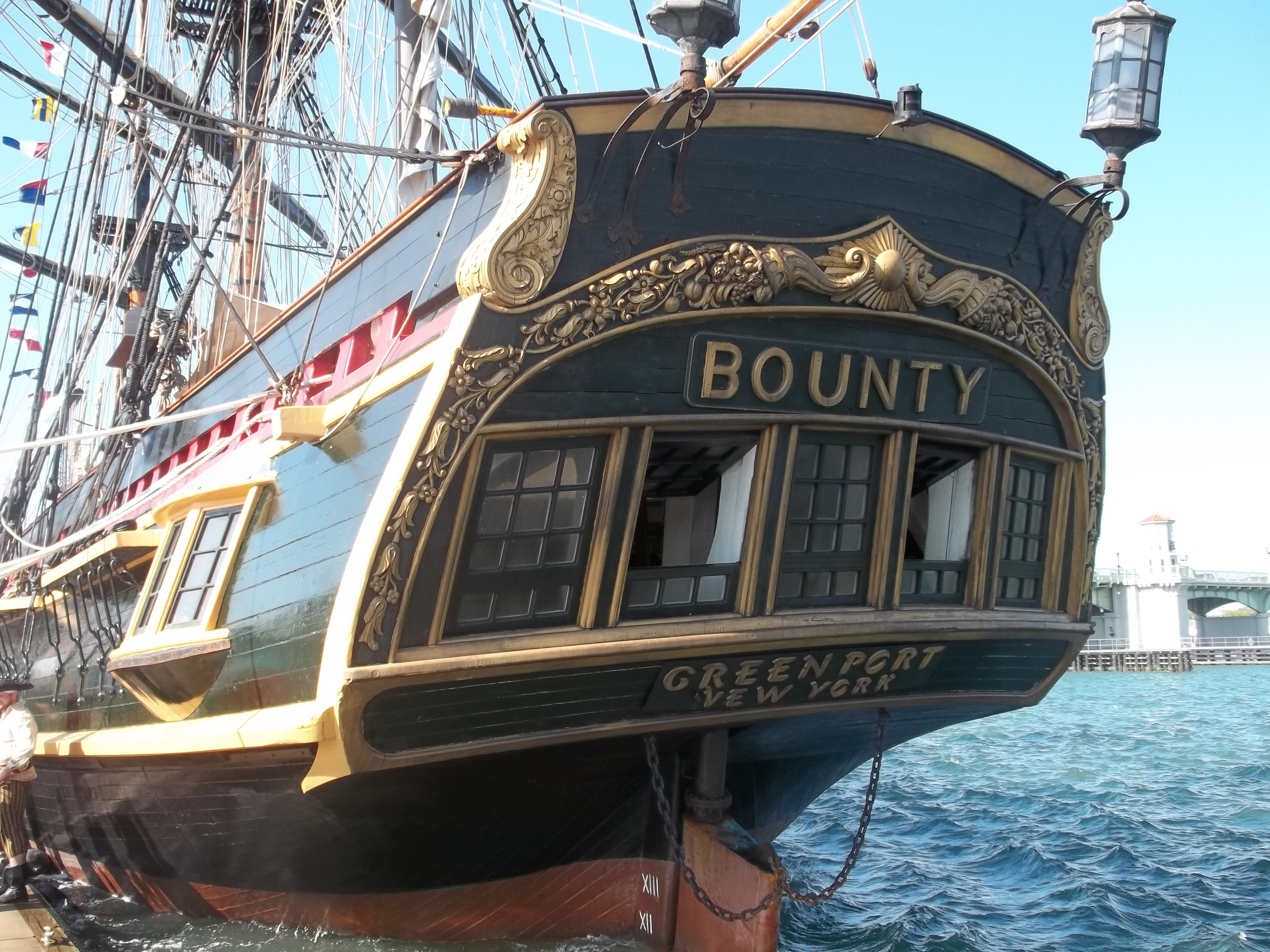
Bounty in St. Augustine, Florida

The Coast Guard rescue of Bounty's crew
