= Rustar Floating Restaurant =

Floating restaurant in Dubai, UAE

Coordinates: 25.25598°N 55.32160°E

Universal travel & Tourism
- Company type: Floating restaurant
- Industry: Hospitality
- Founded: 2007
- Headquarters: Dubai, United Arab Emirates
- Key people: Jaffer Lakhani (Operation Manager)
- Parent: Universal Travel & Tourism
- Website: rustardhowcruise.com

The Rustar dhow located in Dubai, United Arab Emirates is a royal boat that can accommodate 400 passengers. At 51 metres (167 ft) it holds the world record for the largest floating restaurant.

The Rustar Dhow has three levels, a lower level which is used as a bar or dance floor (upon request), the middle level which is a dinner hall and the upper deck, which is an open air dinner deck.
