= Flora Alberta =

Canadian fishing schooner

History

Canada
- Name: Flora Alberta
- Owner: Adams & Knickle
- Port of registry: Lunenburg
- Builder: Smith & Rhuland, Lunenburg
- Launched: 1941
- Fate: Collision with Fanad Head on April 21, 1943

General characteristics
- Tonnage: 93 tons
- Length: 140 ft (43 m)
- Sail plan: Schooner

The FV Flora Alberta was a Canadian auxiliary fishing schooner based out of Lunenburg, Nova Scotia. She was launched in 1941 by Smith and Rhuland, the company's 187th vessel. The managing owner of the vessel was fishing company Adams & Knickle.

== Collision and sinking ==
On April 17, 1943, Flora Alberta, skippered by Captain Guy Tanner, left Lunenburg and headed to the Western Bank fishing grounds. Flora Alberta arrived in the fishing grounds on April 18 and fished for three days. On April 20, 1943, British steamer Fanad Head left Halifax, Nova Scotia alongside a convoy of eight ships heading to the United Kingdom. Fanad Head had a length of 420 feet and a net registered tonnage of 3002 tons.

On April 21, 1943 at approximately 5:20 a.m. (ADT), the Flora Alberta was hit on the starboard side by the Fanad Head in dense fog. The incident occurred approximately 140 kilometers southeast of Halifax. The Flora Alberta was sliced in two by the collision and sank within a few minutes. Most of the Flora Alberta crew were sleeping at the time of the collision and did not have time to escape the sinking ship. Twenty-one of the twenty-eight crew members aboard the Flora Alberta died. The Fanad Head crew put three lifeboats in the ocean immediately after the collision and rescued the surviving crew members.

The deaths of 21 crew members left 46 fatherless children. The local MLA, John James Kinley interceded on behalf of the widows and obtained pensions for the families, based on the sinking being a "wartime incident".

Adams & Knickle immediately decided to build a replacement vessel. In September 1943, the keel of the new vessel was laid and on May 23, 1944 the Frances Geraldine was launched into Lunenburg Harbour.

History Television's documentary series, Disasters of the Century, aired an episode on the incident.

=== Casualties ===
Most of the 21 crew members killed were from Lunenburg County, however four were originally from Newfoundland.

=== Lawsuit ===
The owners of the Flora Alberta claimed $100,000 in damages from the Fanad Head. Justice Carroll, District Judge in Admiralty for the Nova Scotia Admiralty District of the Exchequer Court of Canada, found that the Fanad Head was at fault and gave judgment for the owners of the Flora Alberta. The case went to the Supreme Court of Canada, which apportioned one third liability to the Flora Alberta and two thirds liability to the Fanad Head.
