= FV Margaret Jane =

1965 Canadian stern trawler

History

Canada
- Name: Margaret Jane
- Owner: Adams & Knickle
- Port of registry: Lunenburg, Nova Scotia
- Builder: Snyders Shipyard
- Launched: 1965
- Identification: IMO number: 6621222
- Fate: Sank on July 31, 1980, following collision with Cape Beaver

General characteristics
- Tonnage: 108 tons
- Length: 105 ft (32 m)
- Sail plan: Stern trawler

The FV Margaret Jane was a Canadian stern trawler based out of Lunenburg, Nova Scotia. Built in 1965 at Snyder's Shipyard in Dayspring, she was owned by fishing company Adams & Knickle. She sank in 1980 following a collision at sea with another fishing vessel.

== Collision and sinking ==
On July 31, 1980, Margaret Jane was returning an injured crew member to Lunenburg, Nova Scotia, after three days of scallop fishing with an 18-member crew. Cape Beaver, a steel-plated 160-foot-long (49 m) wetfish trawler owned by National Sea Products, was undergoing her first shakedown cruise in Nova Scotia waters and had dignitaries on board.

At approximately 12:00 p.m. (ADT), Margaret Jane was hit on the port side by Cape Beaver in dense fog. The incident occurred about six kilometres (3.2 nmi; 3.7 mi) from Lunenburg, near West Ironbound Island. The large ice-cutting ball on the bow of Cape Beaver sliced through the side of the Margaret Jane. After the collision, some crewmembers jumped overboard into the Atlantic Ocean and others scrambled into the boat's life raft.

Within two minutes, the Margaret Jane was submerged by water and sank. Four crewmembers of the Margaret Jane died in the incident. Some crew members from Cape Beaver jumped into a life boat and helped rescue survivors. The Cape Beaver boat and crew was not injured and returned to the National Sea Products wharf with rescued crew members from the Margaret Jane. Four injured men were taken to hospital in the incident and the other 10 members of the crew were unharmed after being rescued.

A television film crew from the Canadian Broadcasting Corporation (CBC) was aboard Cape Beaver and captured footage of the collision and aftermath. The video footage was aired on national television across the United States.

=== Casualties ===
Three of the four crew members who died were originally from Newfoundland. The fourth was Kelly Crouse, a 16-year-old who went on the fishing trip while on vacation with his parents.

| Name | Age | Hometown | Notes |
|---|---|---|---|
| Kelly Crouse | 16 | Brockville, Ontario | |
| Aloysius J. Hinks | 34 | Chester, Nova Scotia | |
| Manuel Joseph Jesso | 41 | Stephenville, Newfoundland | |
| Leonard Snook | 55 | English Harbour, Newfoundland | |

=== Inquiry ===
On September 4, 1980, Transport Minister Jean-Luc Pépin ordered a judicial inquiry into the incident. The inquiry was held before Justice A. Gordon Cooper of the Nova Scotia Supreme Court Appeals Division. Captain Morris Nowe, skipper of the Cape Beaver, testified that there was no liquor aboard the ship when it collided with the Margaret Jane.
