= Adams & Knickle =

Canadian fishing company

- Industry: Seafood
- Founded: Lunenburg, Nova Scotia (1897)
- Founders: Harry Adams; Alexander Knickle

Adams & Knickle Ltd. is a Canadian fishing company located in Lunenburg, Nova Scotia. In its early years, the company was an exporter of salt fish. It presently fishes for deep-sea scallops.

== History ==
Founded in 1897 by Harry W. Adams and Captain Alexander Knickle, the company quickly established its niche in the booming salt-fish trade. The company began as the partnership of Knickle & Co. and changed its name to Adams & Knickle Ltd. in 1907. On April 21, 1943, their fishing schooner Flora Alberta collided with the Fanad Head about 140 kilometers from Halifax. The Flora Alberta sunk within a few minutes of the collision and twenty-one crew members died as a result. The company was incorporated on July 30, 1945 and continues under this name as of 2009. During the early 1950s, the salt-fish trade began to dwindle, and a new scallop fishery emerged. In 1954, Adams & Knickle purchased Lunenburg's first deep-sea scallop dragger, the Barbara Jo, and within the next five years, the company launched eight more wooden scallop vessels. By 1962, the offshore fleet had grown to 44 vessels, and to 77 by 1980. On July 31, 1980, their fishing trawler Margaret Jane collided with the Cape Beaver about six kilometers from Lunenburg. The Margaret Jane sunk within two minutes of the collision and four crew members died as a result.
