= HMS Surprise (replica ship) =

Replica tall ship in Nova Scotia, Canada

Coordinates: 32°43′15″N 117°10′26″W

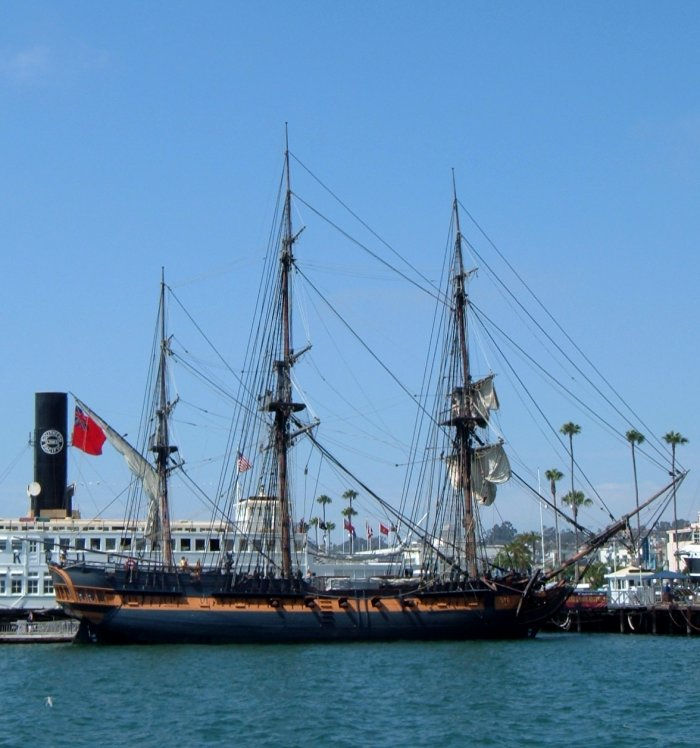
- Surprise in 2005 at the Maritime Museum of San Diego

History
- Name: HMS Surprise
- Owner: Maritime Museum of San Diego; 20th Century Fox (2001–2007); HMS Rose Foundation (1984–2001); John Miller (1970–1984)
- Port of registry: United States
- Builder: Smith and Rhuland Shipyard, Lunenburg, Nova Scotia
- Launched: 1970
- Renamed: HMS Rose (1970-2007)
- Home port: San Diego, California
- Identification: MMSI number: 338167202; Maritime call sign: WSA2459; Primary Vessel Number: 928811; USCG VIN: CG006327; Connecticut VIN: CT8069AB
- Status: Active Museum Ship

General characteristics
- Displacement: 500 long tons (508 t)
- Length: 179 ft 6 in (54.71 m) sparred length; 135 ft 6 in (41.30 m) on deck; 114 ft 6 in (34.90 m) w/l
- Beam: 32 ft (9.8 m)
- Height: of Rig 130 ft (40 m)
- Draft: 13 ft (4.0 m)
- Propulsion: Twin Diesel (300 HP Each)
- Sail plan: Full-rigged ship, sail area 13,000 ft^{2} (1,200 m^{2})
- Armament: 28 × 9-pound cannons (non-operational)

HMS Surprise is a modern tall ship built at Lunenburg, Nova Scotia, Canada. The vessel was built in 1970 as HMS Rose to a Phil Bolger design based on the original 18th-century British Admiralty drawings of HMS Rose, a 20-gun sixth-rate post ship from 1757.

== As HMS Rose ==
The ship was meant to be a close replica of the original Rose, but still fill a commercial function. John Fitzhugh Millar commissioned the ship's construction in anticipation of the US Bicentennial in 1976. In conjunction with this project, he appeared on the television show To Tell the Truth in 1974 and stumped the panel. Millar gave Bolger copies of the original British Admiralty drawings. Bolger modified the hull shape below the water line, sharpening up her entry so she sailed to windward better. Unlike some square-riggers, she could sail two points (22-1/2 degrees) on the wind provided that seas remained under four feet or so. Bolger also changed the arrangement of her decks, at the bank's insistence, so that she could be used as a tavern and restaurant, though she was never used as such.

Rose was built at the Smith and Rhuland shipyard in Lunenburg, a yard which had established a reputation for large and successful replicas such as HMS Bounty in 1960 and Bluenose II in 1963.

The ship was inspected and certified by the United States Coast Guard. She spent the first ten years of her life in Newport, Rhode Island, sailing in Newport Harbor and as a dockside attraction.

In the summer of 1972, Rose was hired for the film The Man Without a Country, a made-for-television production. Norman Rosemont Productions could not find the money to take the ship out sailing, so all the filming was shot with sails set, as the ship was securely moored to the pier, next to the causeway to Goat Island.

In 1984, already in serious disrepair, she was purchased by Kaye Williams and brought to Bridgeport, Connecticut, and operated as a sail training vessel in the 1980s and 1990s, run by the HMS Rose Foundation based in Bridgeport, Connecticut, United States. In her lifetime as Rose, her figurehead had to be replaced twice, each time slightly upgraded. One was damaged in a storm off Bermuda on her way to Norfolk, Virginia, in June 1998. The figurehead was named in fun as "Chester" by the crew.

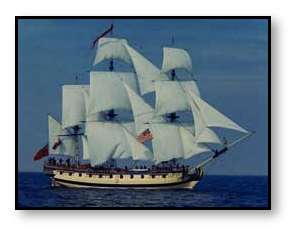
Replica HMS Rose off Massachusetts in 1971, the hull painted as her namesake

== Transformation into HMS Surprise ==
The ship was sold to the 20th Century Fox film studio in March 2001, and underwent extensive modifications to be used in the making of the film Master and Commander: The Far Side of the World, in which she portrayed the Royal Navy frigate HMS Surprise with a story based on several of the books by Patrick O'Brian. The modifications included a reshaped stern, all deck structures removed, the single ship's wheel replaced by a double wheel, period fighting tops fitted, new sails, and the figurehead replaced.

== Renaming as HMS Surprise ==
After the film was complete, the ship was leased and then purchased by the Maritime Museum of San Diego which began restoring her to sailing condition in September 2007. The ship was officially re-registered as "HMS Surprise" in honor of her role in the film. She sailed several times a year until 2011, often with the museum's other tall ships, the schooner Californian and the 1863 barque Star of India. In 2010, she portrayed HMS Providence in the Disney adventure film Pirates of the Caribbean: On Stranger Tides. In 2020 the deck was replanked by the museum. The ship was briefly taken off display for work done by the Pacific Maritime Group and returned to the museum in June 2022. By 2024 the ship was in a worn condition with deteriorating paint and timbers. On July 14, 2026; the museum announced plans to close the ship to the public on August 1, 2027; while studying possible routes to deaccession the ship from their collection.

== Related facts ==
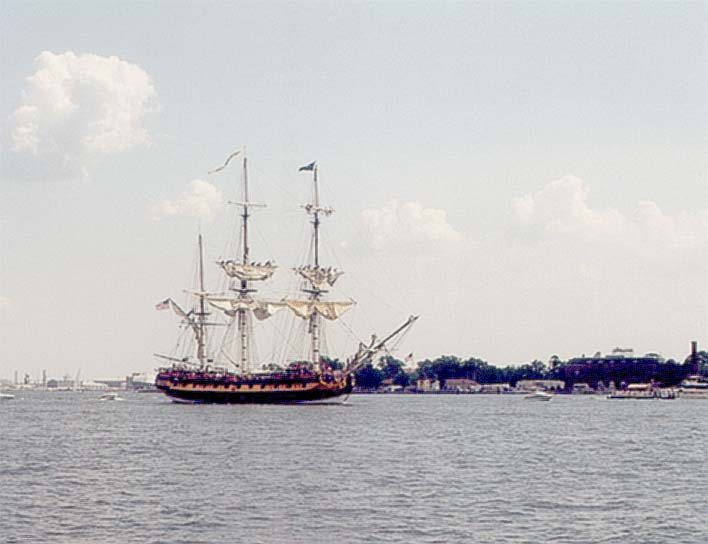
HMS Rose in 2000 painted to resemble the original Surprise coming into Baltimore

Although she is known by the prefix "HMS", meaning His (or Her) Majesty's Ship, she has never been commissioned in the Royal Navy.

In 1991, the Connecticut General Assembly passed "An Act Concerning the HMS Rose" in which the ship was commissioned as a vessel of the Connecticut Naval Militia. The act stated that the H.M.S. Rose Foundation was responsible for maintaining the ship, but when the ship was sold to 20th Century Fox, the statute was not repealed and is still in effect.
