= Smith & Rhuland =

Shipyard in nova scotia, Canada

Smith and Rhuland
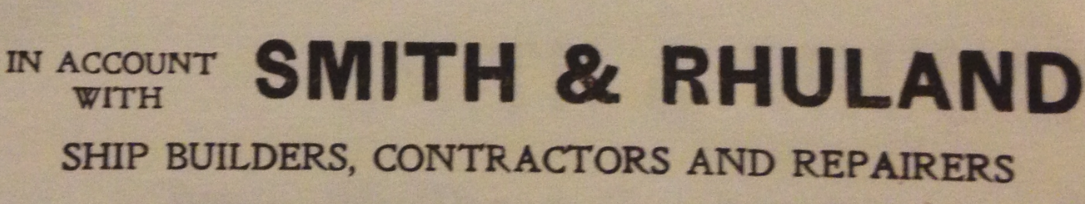
- Industry: Shipbuilding
- Founded: 1900
- Defunct: 2005
- Successor: Scotia Trawler Equipment Limited
- Headquarters: 280 Montague Street, Lunenburg, Nova Scotia, Canada
- Key people: George. A Rhuland, Richard W. Smith, Fred Rhuland, John Rhuland

Smith & Rhuland was a shipyard located in Lunenburg, Nova Scotia, Canada. The yard was originally opened in 1900 and was the builder of the esteemed Bluenose. The shipyard prided itself in creating quality vessels of all shapes and sizes.

== History ==
Smith & Rhuland was founded in 1900 by George A. Rhuland (1867–1950) and Richard W. Smith (1871–1954) in Lunenburg, Nova Scotia, Canada. Smith and Rhuland, over its 105 years in operation completed many famous vessels including Bluenose (1921), Flora Alberta (1941), Sherman Zwicker (1942), Bluenose II (1963), Bounty (1961), and HMS Surprise (1970). The current shipyard was home to the company from 1905. The Smith & Rhuland Yard is located on Lunenburg's historic waterfront adjacent to the Lunenburg Marine Railway.

Fred and John Rhuland took over Smith & Rhuland after their father, George Rhuland died in 1950. In September 1955 Smith & Rhuland started to manufacture pleasure craft. Some of the first pleasure craft built by Smith & Rhuland were named "Bluenose 26", a play on their most famous vessel Bluenose.

In 1963 the shipyard launched the Bluenose II, a replica of the original using some of the same workers.

== Fate ==
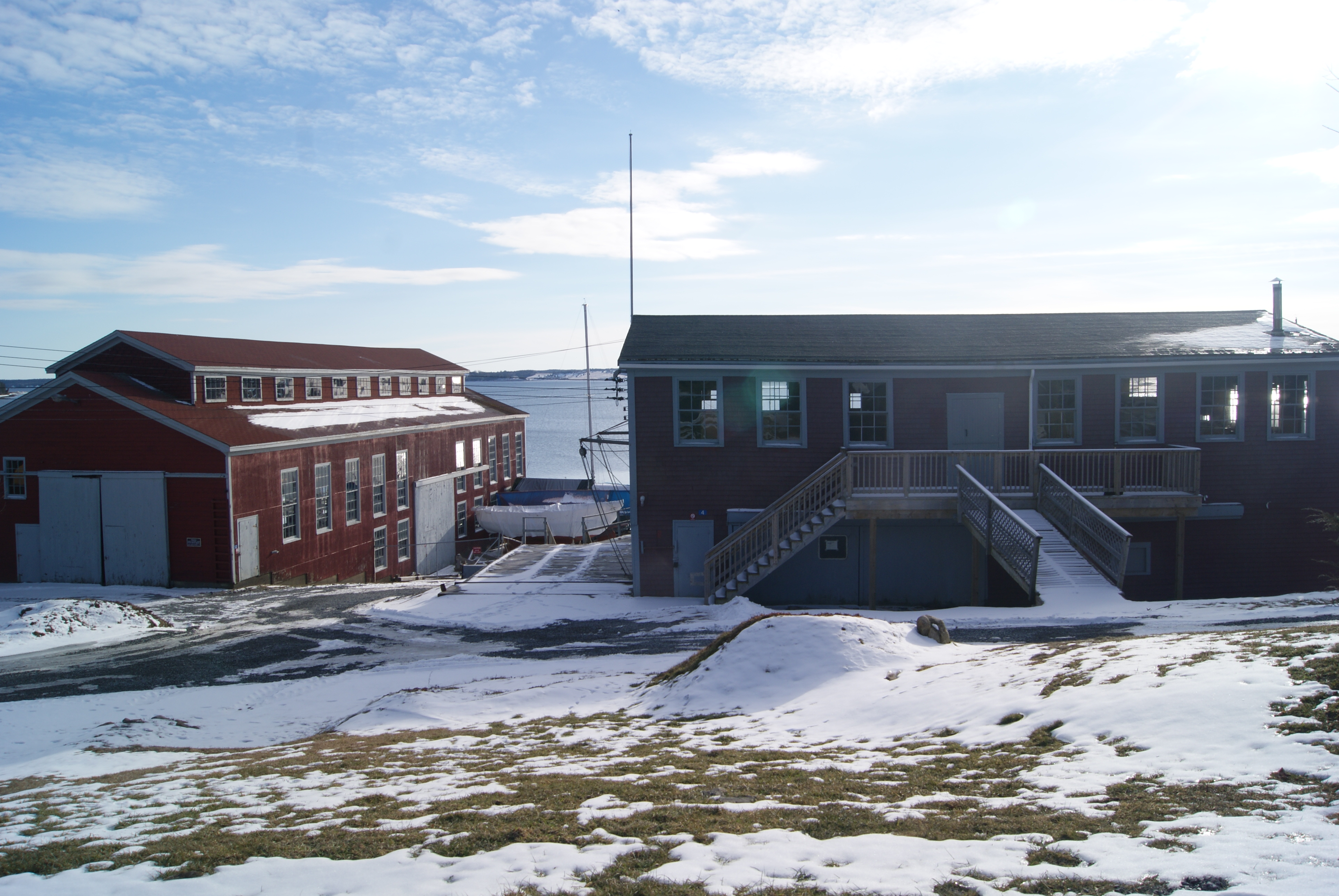
Smith & Rhuland, Lunenburg, Nova Scotia, 2013.

After many years of fine shipbuilding Smith & Rhuland closed its doors in 1967. During the shipyard's history it constructed over 270 vessels. The yard was operated by Scotia Trawler Equipment Limited from 1967 until 2003, when it was sold to Clearwater Seafoods. Scotia Trawler, established in 1962, has performed many refits and repairs of original Smith & Rhuland vessels, including Theresa E. Connor and Bluenose II.

In March 2005, Clearwater Seafoods, the then owner of the yard, announced its closure.

In 2012, the shipyard site was chosen for the rebuild of Bluenose II.
