= Victory Chimes (schooner) =

Chesapeake Ram schooner (1900)

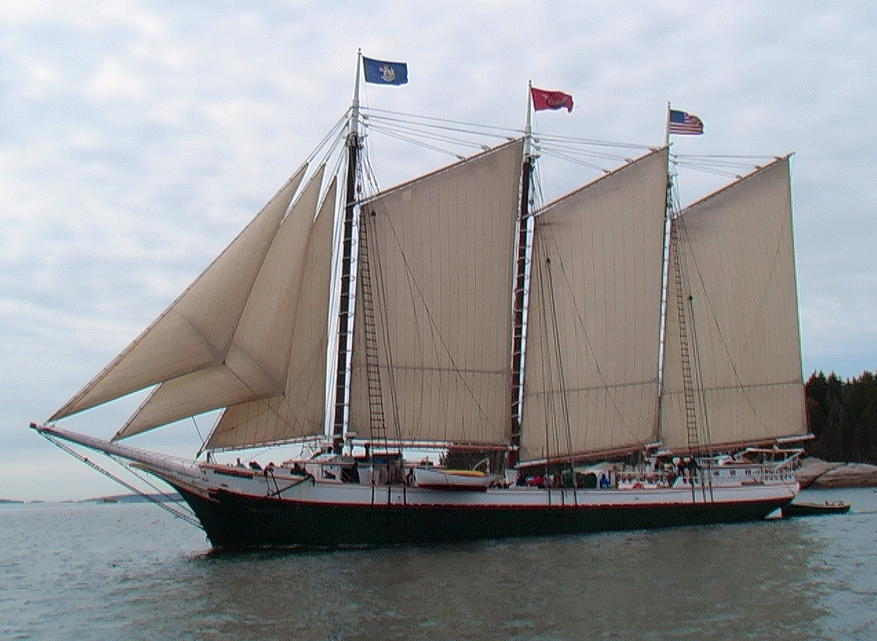

History

United States
- Name: Edwin and Maude (1900–1954); Victory Chimes (1954–c.1988); Domino Effect (c.1988–1990); Victory Chimes (1990–)
- Builder: George K. Phillips Co., Bethel, Delaware; J.M.C. Moore, designer
- Launched: April 1900
- Home port: Rockland, Maine
- Identification: Official number 136784
- Status: Sank between 3 and 5 July 2026

General characteristics
- Type: Chesapeake Ram schooner
- Tonnage: 208 tons (gross), 178 tons (net)
- Length: 127.5 ft (38.9 m)
- Beam: 23.8 ft (7.3 m)
- Draft: 7 ft 6 in (2.29 m) (centerboard up); 18 ft (5.5 m) (centerboard down)
- Propulsion: 210 hp (160 kW) Cummins diesel (2010)
- Sail plan: Three masted Gaff rigged schooner
- Speed: 7 knots (13 km/h; 8.1 mph)
- Complement: 9 crew members, 50 guests
- Victory Chimes
- U.S. National Register of Historic Places
- U.S. National Historic Landmark
- Location within Maine Location within the United States
- Location: Rockland, Maine
- Coordinates: 44°6′41″N 69°6′14″W
- Built: 1900
- Architect: J.M.C.Moore
- NRHP reference No.: 93000637

Significant dates
- Added to NRHP: 24 June 1996
- Designated NHL: 25 September 1997

The three-masted schooner Victory Chimes, previously known as Edwin and Maud and Domino Effect, was the last surviving Chesapeake Ram schooner and a National Historic Landmark in the United States. The schooner on the 2003 Maine State Quarter is meant to resemble Victory Chimes.

== Construction ==
Victory Chimes was built at Bethel, Delaware, in 1900 by the George K. Phillips Company. She was named Edwin and Maude after the children of her first captain, Robert E. Riggin. According to her 1997 National Historic Landmark nomination:

The traditional "ram" rig was a standing jib, flying jib, staysail (also called a forestaysail), foresail, mainsail and spanker (or mizzen), which Victory Chimes carries today. The heads of the fore, main and mizzen sails are supported by gaffs and the feet are laced to booms ... The standing rigging is steel wire. Standing rigging was minimal on rams, to enable deck cargo to be stowed on uncluttered decks.

Edwin and Maude was designed to carry general cargo in the Chesapeake Bay. She was built with a centerboard, and a shallow draft for work in the bay. According to her 1997 National Historic Landmark nomination, her centerboard, replaced in 1965, "draws 7 feet 6 inches [2.3 meters] with the centerboard up and 18 feet [5.5 meters] with the centerboard down."

== Sailing career ==
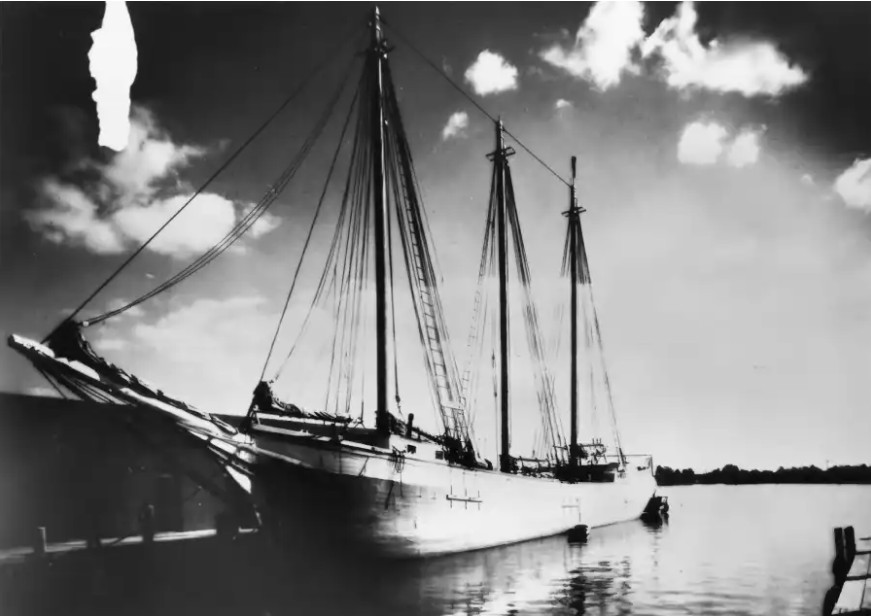
Edwin and Maude in 1930.

Edwin and Maude served in the cargo trade until 1945 carrying "sawn lumber, grain, soft coal and fertilizer," according to her 1997 National Historic Landmark nomination. She was converted to carry passengers in 1946.

She was renamed Victory Chimes after purchase by a syndicate in 1954, for charter in Maine. In 1984, the ship was purchased by a Minnesota banker, Jerry Jubie, "for about $1 million", who brought her to Duluth, Minnesota. She was used for educational cruises for high school students, sold at auction in 1987, and sold again by Norwest Bank in 1988 to Thomas Monaghan, the owner of Domino's Pizza. Monaghan renamed her Domino Effect. He used the vessel for employee incentive cruises, and invested a considerable amount of money in restoring her with traditional methods at Sample's Shipyard in Boothbay Harbor, Maine. The ship returned to Maine in 1989, where Captain Kip Files and Captain Paul DeGaeta purchased her in 1990 for use in the passenger trade. They changed her name back to Victory Chimes. In 1997, the vessel reportedly was operating as a traditional sailing ship, without an engine on board. According to her 1997 National Historic Landmark nomination:

Just as when Victory Chimes was built, the schooner does not carry an engine. Maneuvering assistance is provided by a nineteen[-]foot 19 ft (5.8 m) wooden yawlboat which pushes against the stern. When not in use it is towed astern. The current yawl boat was built in 1991 ... to enable the vessel to compete with other vessels in the passenger schooner trade which have been modified to carry engines. The yawlboat is ..."probably a bit bigger than would have originally been used." It is powered by a 135[-]horsepower [101-kilowatt] Ford diesel engine. Three other boats are carried on davits.

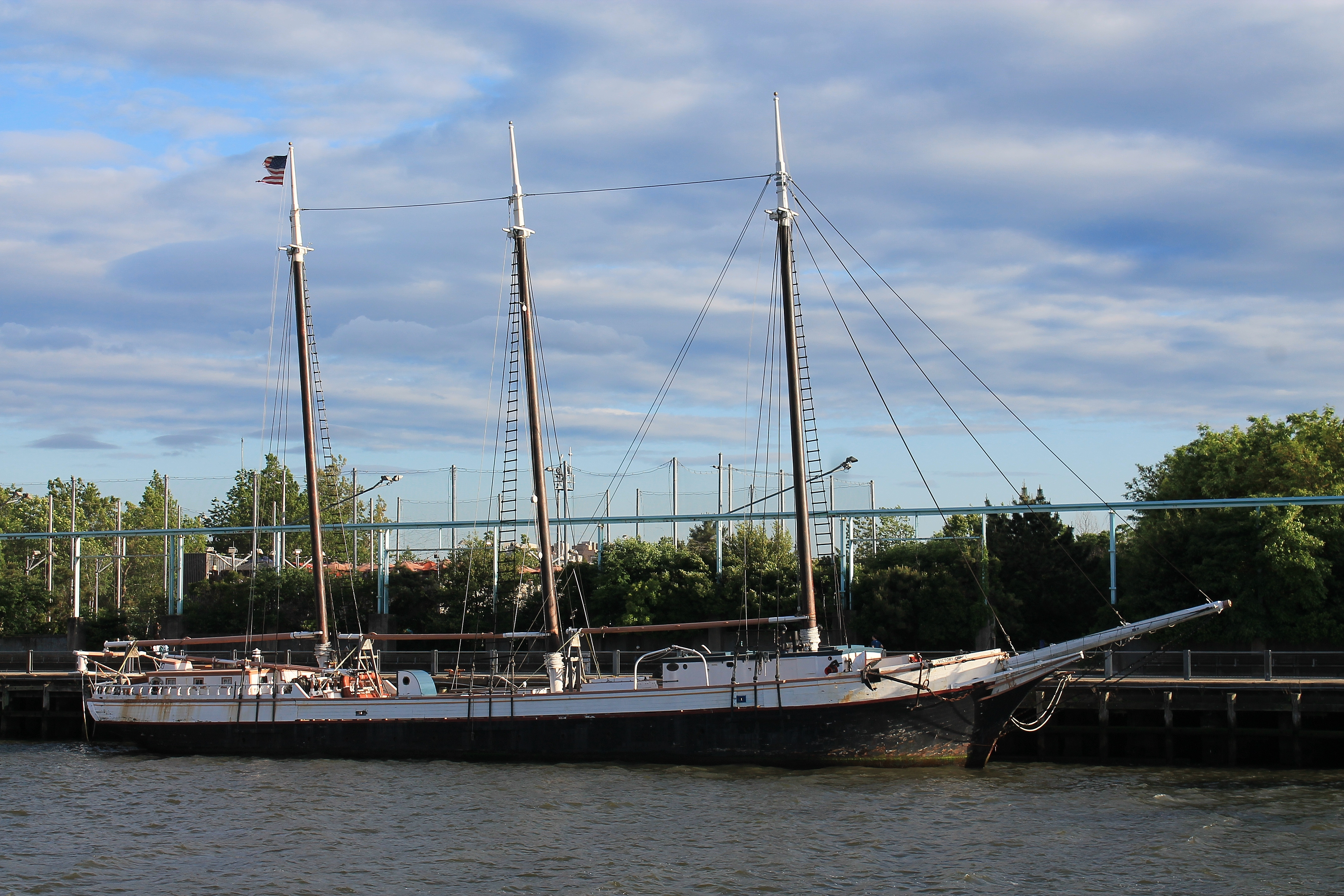
Victory Chimes docked in Brooklyn Bridge Park in May 2025.

In 2010, the yawl boat of Victory Chimes, Enoch, was equipped with a 210 hp (157 kW) Cummins diesel engine. The donkey engine which retrieves the anchors and can be used to raise sail is a 6 hp (4.5 kW) single-cylinder Seeger manufactured by Olds and installed in 1904.

Victory Chimes was sold at auction in May 2023 for $75,900. Her new owners, New York City-based restauranteurs Miles and Alex Pincus, also operate the historic ships-turned-floating restaurants Pilot (until her sinking) and Sherman Zwicker. Victory Chimes was relocated to New York City later that year, and remained docked at Pier 6 in Brooklyn Bridge Park.

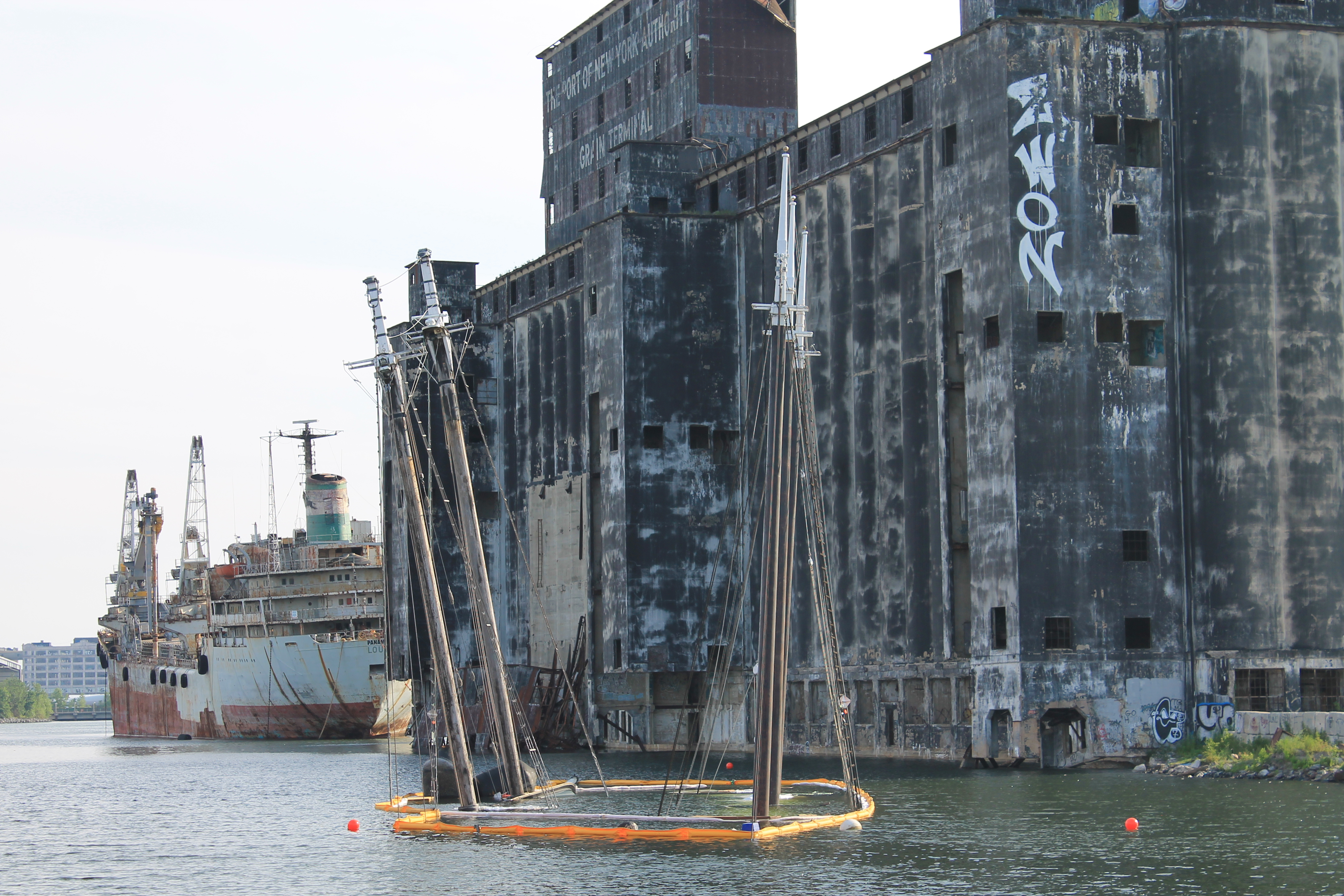
Victory Chimes (right) sunk alongside Pilot on 11 July 2026.

Unused as a restaurant, Victory Chimes was moved to the Henry Street Basin adjacent to the Red Hook Grain Terminal in the Red Hook neighborhood of Brooklyn, New York in early 2026, alongside the historic schooner Pilot — which had served as a floating bar from 2017 to 2025 — when Pilot sank at her moorings sometime during the night of July 1–2, 2026. Victory Chimes then began to take on water at her moorings during a strong squall that hit the harbor on July 3, 2026, in the midst of New York City's Sail250 festivities. Victory Chimes was found on the harbor bottom on July 5, 2026, having sunk next to Pilot in the interim. According to press reports Victory Chimes was in bad condition when the squall hit.

== National Historic Landmark ==
The vessel was listed on the National Register of Historic Places in 1996 and was designated a National Historic Landmark in 1997.

== See also ==
- List of schooners
- List of National Historic Landmarks in Maine
- National Register of Historic Places listings in Knox County, Maine
- List of oldest surviving ships
