= Pilot (1924 boat) =

Boston Pilot boat

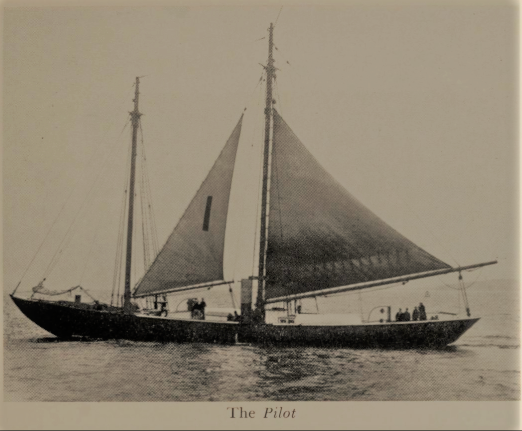
- Pilot Boat Pilot, No. 1.

History

United StatesUnited States
- Name: Pilot
- Namesake: Maritime pilot
- Owner: Boston Pilots' Association
- Operator: William H. Lewis
- Builder: J. F. James & Son
- Cost: US$52,000
- Launched: October 2, 1924
- In service: 1924
- Out of service: 1976
- Home port: Boston, Massachusetts
- Fate: Sold 1976; Sank 1–2 July 2026

General characteristics
- Tonnage: 140 tons
- Displacement: 240.74 tons
- Length: 121 ft (36.9 m)
- Beam: 25 ft (7.6 m)
- Draft: 14 ft (4.3 m)
- Propulsion: Sails, 100 hp (75 kW) diesel engine
- Sail plan: Schooner-rigged
- Notes: Carvel, single 3-inch (76 mm) planks of oak and mahogany on oak frames

Pilot was a pilot boat designed by yacht designer William Starling Burgess and built in 1924. The Boston Pilots' Association purchased her to take the place of the pilot boat Louise No. 2, which was withdrawn from service in 1924. Pilot was in service for over 50 years before she was sold in 1976. She became the longest-serving pilot boat in United States history.

== Construction and pilot service ==
Pilot was designed by yacht designer William Starling Burgess in 1924 to replace the pilot boat Louise No. 2, which was withdrawn from pilot service on December 9, 1924. Pilot was built for the Boston Pilots' Association at the J. F. James & Son shipyard (formerly known as Tarr & James) at Essex County, Massachusetts. She was a spoon-bowed knockabout schooner, built without a bowsprit, equipped with a twin-screw diesel engine. Her length was 121 feet (36.9 m) overall and 98 feet (29.9 m) at the waterline, and she had a 25-foot (7.6 m) beam. She had "No. 1" painted across her mainsail.

Pilot was launched at the Essex County shipyard on October 2, 1924. Her construction had cost US$52,000.

Pilot arrived in Boston on November 19, 1924, from Gloucester, Massachusetts, with Captain Murdock McLean in command. McLean had supervised her construction.

On December 9, 1924, Pilot left Lewis Wharf in Boston with 50 guests aboard on her trial trip past Boston Light. Captain William H. Lewis commanded her during the trial trip.

During World War II, Pilot worked for the United States Coast Guard, moving troop transports, cargo ships, and tankers. After the war she returned to the Boston Pilots' Associations until the early 1970s.

== Later service ==
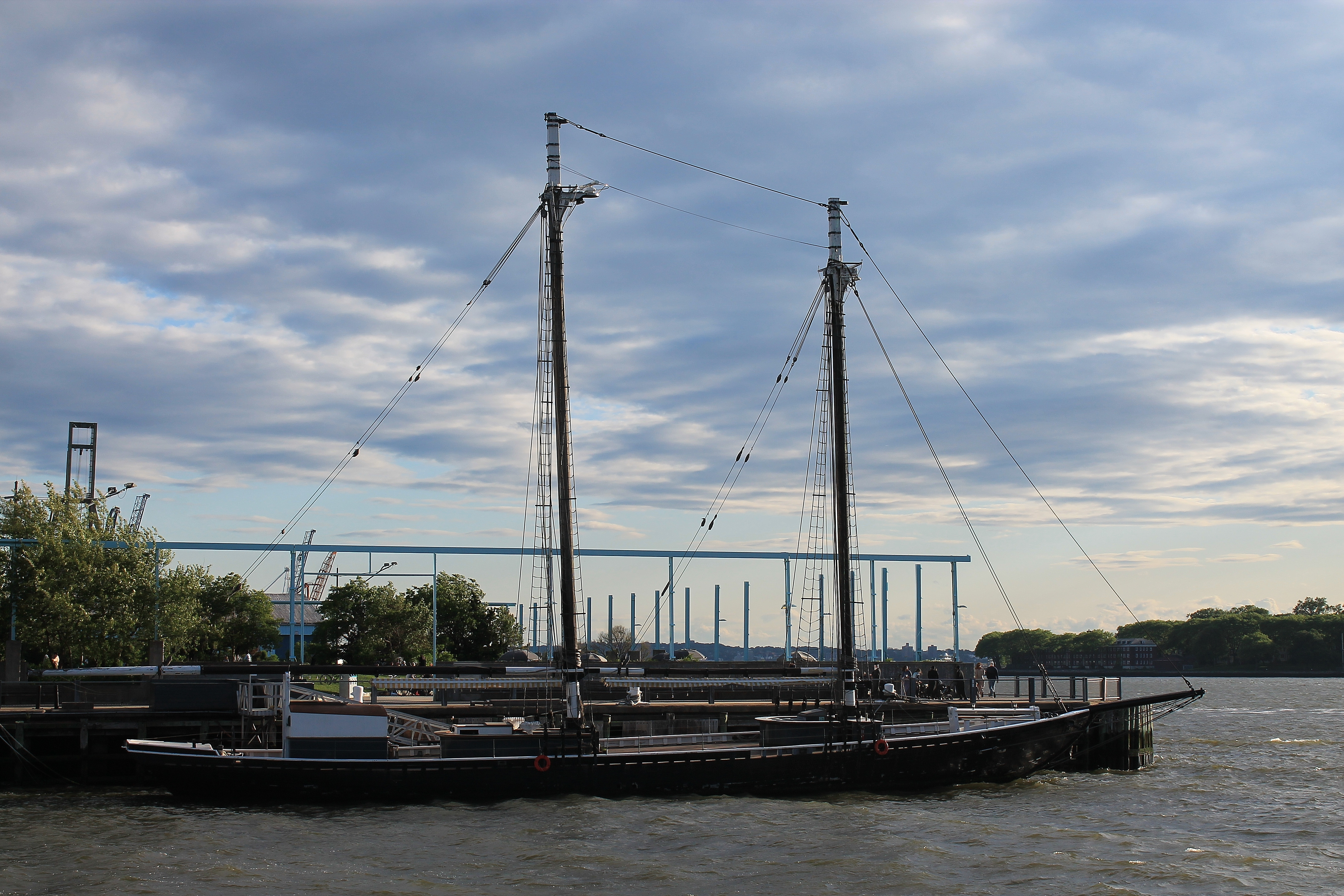
Pilot docked in Brooklyn Bridge Park, May 2025.

Pilot was sold in 1976 to Norman D. Paulsen of California to serve as a research vessel. She was sold again in 1998 and renamed Highlander Sea. She subsequently was sold several more times, and in 2015 Miles and Alex Pincus purchased her and converted into a maritime attraction at the Brooklyn Bridge Park. She operated as a seasonal floating bar from 2017 to 2025. In early 2026, she was moved from her berth in Brooklyn Bridge Park to Henry Street Basin in Red Hook for maintenance.

== Sinking ==
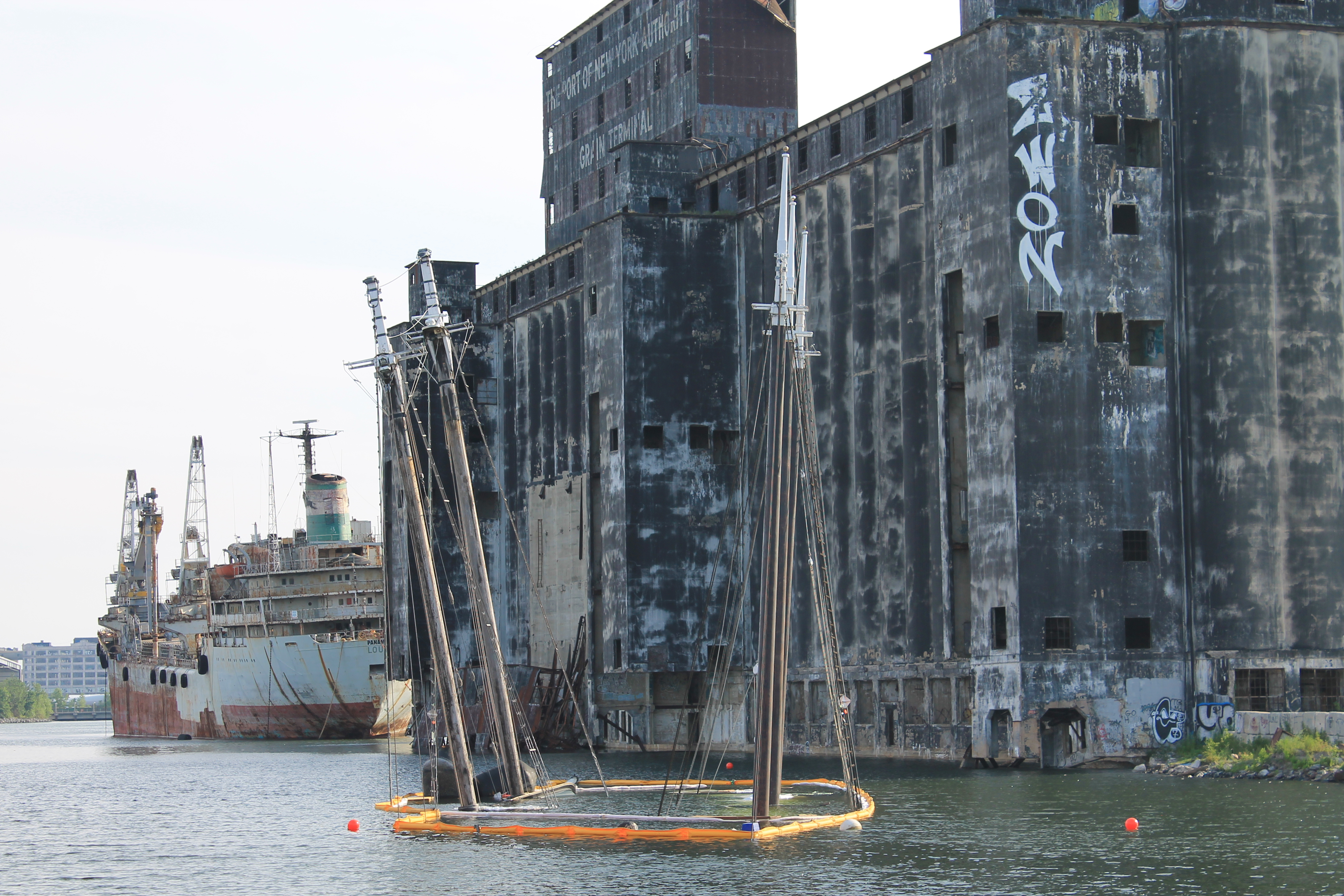
Pilot (left) sunk alongside Victory Chimes on 11 July 2026.

Pilot sank at her moorings sometime during the night of July 1–2, 2026, while moored in the Henry Street Basin adjacent to the Red Hook Grain Terminal in the Red Hook neighborhood of Brooklyn, New York, alongside the historic schooner Victory Chimes. Victory Chimes then began to take on water at her moorings during a strong squall that hit the harbor on July 3, 2026, and was found on the harbor bottom on July 5, 2026, having sunk alongside Pilot in the interim.

== Earlier Pilot (1917) ==
An earlier Maryland pilot boat named Pilot, constructed in 1880, became entangled in a submarine net while trying to enter the inner harbor at Hampton Roads, Virginia, on December 16, 1917. Before she could free herself, the Merchants and Miners Line steamer Berkshire collided with and sank her without loss of life.

== See also ==
- List of Northeastern U. S. Pilot Boats
