= Dan Rutherford =

American politician

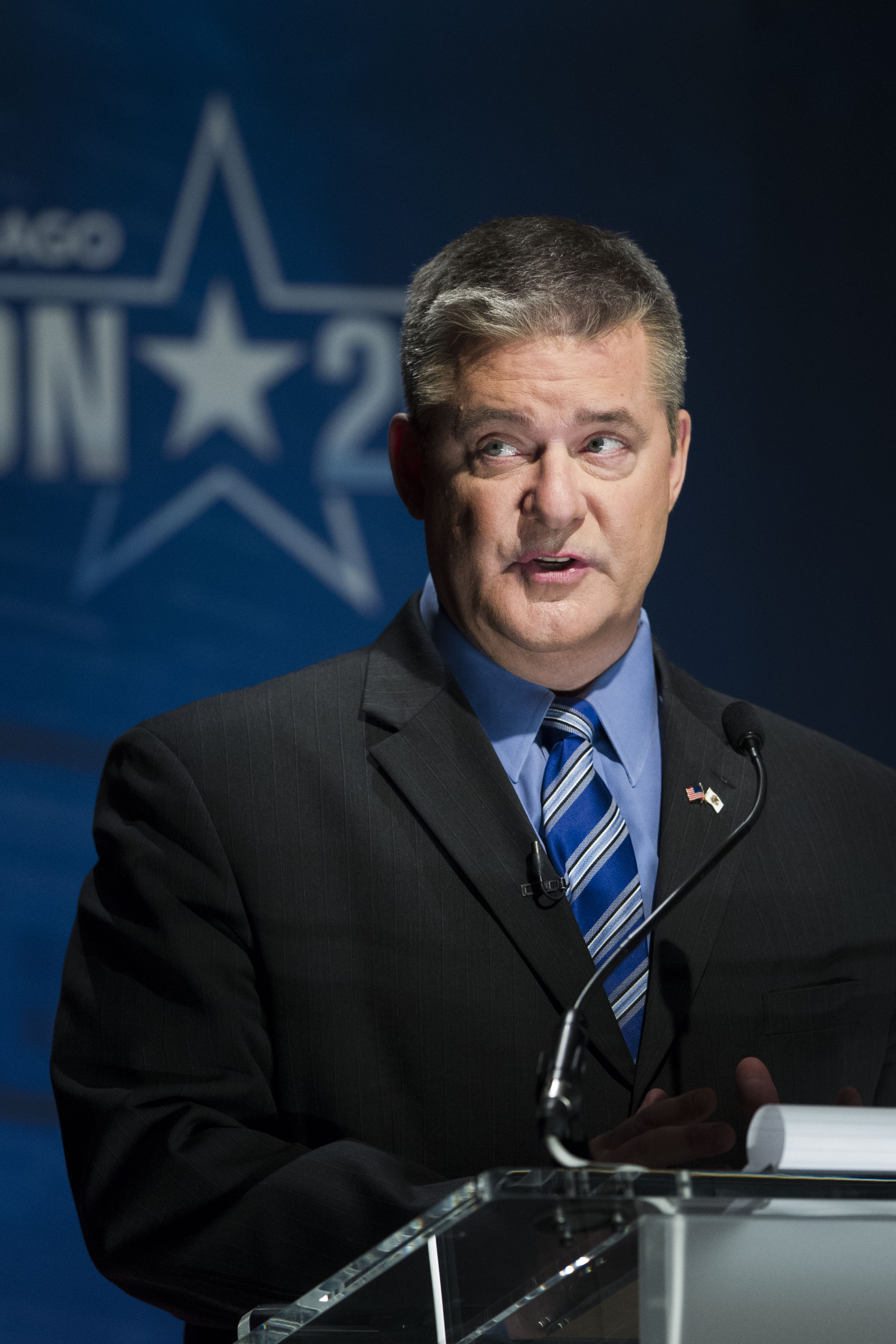
- Rutherford speaks at candidate forum (2014)

73rd Treasurer of Illinois
- In office January 10, 2011 – January 12, 2015
- Governor: Pat Quinn
- Preceded by: Alexi Giannoulias
- Succeeded by: Mike Frerichs

Member of the Illinois Senate from the 53rd district
- In office 2003–2011
- Preceded by: Judy Myers (redistricted)
- Succeeded by: Shane Cultra

Member of the Illinois House of Representatives from the 87th district
- In office 1993–2003
- Preceded by: Les Conkling
- Succeeded by: Bill Mitchell

Personal details
- Born: May 26, 1955 (age 71) Pontiac, Illinois, U.S.
- Party: Republican
- Education: Illinois State University

Dan Rutherford (born May 26, 1955) is an American politician who served as the 73rd Treasurer of Illinois from 2011 to 2015. A member of the Republican Party, he previously was the Illinois State Senator from the 53rd district from 2003 to 2011 and a member of the Illinois House of Representatives from 1993 to 2003.

== Early life and education ==
Rutherford was born in Pontiac, Illinois. During elementary and high school Rutherford worked at his parents' pizza restaurant. and attended Pontiac Township High School. Following high school, Rutherford attended Illinois State University. While at Illinois State University, Rutherford was elected Student Body President.

== Business career ==
While on a business trip to Japan in 1984, Rutherford became familiar with the ServiceMaster Company. One year later, he joined the Downers Grove, Illinois-headquartered company as an executive. Rutherford eventually became responsible for expansion of the company's businesses internationally, licensing services in Chile, Brazil, Honduras, Japan, Hong Kong, Malaysia, Guam, Venezuela, South Africa, Spain, and a host of other countries. ServiceMaster is a family of service companies that operated with trade names such as ServiceMaster clean, Terminix, Tru-Green Chem Lawn, Merry Maids, American Home Shield, and Rescue Rooter during this period.

== Political career ==
=== Early political career ===
In 1978, Rutherford served as a legislative aide to then-State Representative Thomas W. Ewing. During the 1980 Republican Party presidential primaries, Rutherford coordinated a congressional district for the campaign of Ronald Reagan. He eventually became the statewide executive director in Illinois. After a brief stint working for Governor James R. Thompson, Rutherford managed the 1982 campaign of Ty Fahner, whom Thompson had appointed to the position of Illinois Attorney General. After Fahner's loss, Rutherford returned to Thompson's administration, this time as the manager for the International Business Division of the Illinois Department of Commerce and Community Affairs.

In 1991, Robert Mosbacher, the U.S. Secretary of Commerce, appointed Rutherford to the International Service Advisory Committee. The committee was tasked with reviewing various American trade deals and the General Agreement on Trade and Tariffs.

=== Illinois General Assembly ===
Rutherford defeated incumbent Les Conkling in the 1992 Republican primary. In an unusually competitive general election for the otherwise staunchly Republican area of the state, Democratic candidate and basketball coach Chuck Rolinski came within two percentage points of defeating Rutherford. Rutherford eventually became Assistant Republican Leader.

In the 2002 Republican primary, Rutherford defeated Brian Heller, a member of the Tazewell County Board, for the Republican nomination for the newly drawn 53rd district. In the Senate, Rutherford served as the ranking Republican for the Financial Institutions Committee and was a member of the Environment & Energy Committee. Senator Rutherford also served on the bi-partisan Joint Committee on Administrative Rules.

As a lawmaker, Rutherford sponsored and directed legislation which changed the formula for reimbursing nursing homes for care of the elderly. The new system bases rates on the medical needs of the resident, rather than just their geographic location in the state.

== Political campaigns ==
During the 2008 Republican Party presidential primaries, Rutherford served as the Illinois state chairman for the presidential campaign of Mitt Romney. Rutherford was also on Romney's delegate slate for Illinois's 15th congressional district.

=== 2006 Illinois Secretary of State campaign ===
On September 12, 2005, Rutherford officially announced his campaign for the office of Illinois Secretary of State. Rutherford faced incumbent Democratic Illinois Secretary of State Jesse White, of Jesse White Tumbling Team fame, and Green Party candidate Karen Young Peterson, in the November, 2006 election, but lost to Jesse White.

=== 2010 Illinois Treasurer campaign ===
Rutherford won the open seat of Illinois Treasurer. Also running were Democratic nominee Robin Kelly, Green Party Party nominee Scott K. Summers and Libertarian nominee James Pauly.

=== 2014 Governor ===
Gubernatorial campaign logo

On June 2, 2013, Rutherford officially announced his candidacy for Governor of Illinois. His running mate was attorney Steve Kim.

Rutherford lost in the 4-way Republican primary to businessman Bruce Rauner, taking 7.55% of the vote.

=== 2014 scandal ===
In February 2014, a former employee of Rutherford, Edmund Michalowski, filed a federal complaint alleging that Rutherford had sexually harassed him and had pressured him to do political work on state time. The complaint was filed just a few weeks before Rutherford was scheduled to face off against the other contenders in the Republican gubernatorial primary. Rutherford denied all allegations and charged that they were the work of his political opponent, Bruce Rauner. Rutherford vowed that he would continue on in the race A judge dismissed some of Michalowski's claims, such as Michalowski being forced to do political work on state time and Michalowski re-filed in April 2016, alleging harassment by Rutherford and four others. In November 2017, attorneys for Rutherford and Michalowski agreed that the lawsuit be "dismissed without prejudice", meaning that it could be re-filed.

== Personal ==
Rutherford has never been married. He has crewed in many Chicago-to-Mackinac Island races and is an Advanced Certified Diver. Rutherford has traveled to all seven continents.

== Electoral history ==
- 2010 election for Treasurer of Illinois
  - Dan Rutherford (R), 49.9%
  - Robin Kelly (D), 45.1%
  - Scott Summers (G), 3.2%
  - James Pauly (L), 1.9%
- 2006 election for Secretary of State of Illinois
  - Jesse White (D) (inc.), 62%
  - Dan Rutherford (R), 34%

Party political offices
Preceded by Kris O'Rourke Cohn	Republican nominee for Secretary of State of Illinois; 2006	Succeeded by Robert Enriquez
Preceded by Christine Radogno	Republican nominee for Illinois Treasurer; 2010	Succeeded by Tom Cross
Political offices
Preceded by Alexi Giannoulias	Treasurer of Illinois; 2011 - 2015	Succeeded by Mike Frerichs
