= ServiceMaster Clean =

Commercial cleaning services company

- Company type: Subsidiary
- Industry: Cleaning industry
- Founded: 1929; 97 years ago in Chicago, Illinois
- Founder: Marion E. Wade
- Headquarters: Memphis, Tennessee, United States
- Services: Commercial cleaning services
- Parent: ServiceMaster
- Website: servicemasterclean.com

ServiceMaster Clean is an American company that provides commercial cleaning and disinfecting services in commercial, healthcare, and religious facilities throughout the United States, Canada and ten other countries. It runs using franchising and also operates its own branches.

== History ==
The ServiceMaster Company was founded in 1929 as a moth-proofing company in Chicago, Illinois, by Marion E. Wade, a former minor league baseball player. In 1937, it expanded into rug and carpet cleaning, and the first in-home carpet cleaning customer was served using products developed by Wade.

The ServiceMaster Company incorporated in 1947, with six employees and revenue of $125,000. In 1952, the first franchise was sold, establishing one of country's first franchise business models. The ServiceMaster Clean name was now in use.

In the late 20th century, further expansion of The ServiceMaster Company's Consumer Services business formed a network of service companies. Headquartered in Memphis, Tennessee, this network included ServiceMaster Clean, Terminix, TruGreen, Merry Maids, Furniture Medic and AmeriSpec.

Clayton, Dubilier & Rice, Inc. (CD&R), based in New York City, acquired The ServiceMaster Company in 2007. In 2011, Hank Mullany, a former Walmart executive, was appointed as CEO for all ServiceMaster brands, and Thomas J. Coba, former COO of Subway, was named president of ServiceMaster's franchise brands, including ServiceMaster Clean, Merry Maids, Furniture Medic and AmeriSpec.

The company began trading on the New York Stock Exchange in 2014. Nikhil Varty was appointed as chief executive officer in July 2017. In 2018, ServiceMaster spun off frontdoor, inc., the parent company of American Home Shield.

In October 2020, Roark Capital Group purchased ServiceMaster Brands, including ServiceMaster Clean.

== Organizational structure ==
ServiceMaster Clean, a subsidiary of ServiceMaster Brands, has 4,500 independently owned and operated franchises worldwide. Its sister companies include ServiceMaster Restore, Merry Maids, AmeriSpec and FurnitureMedic.

Its primary service areas are cleaning and disinfection services in commercial and healthcare spaces. The company has a number of patents.

== See also ==
- List of cleaning companies
