= Economy of Memphis, Tennessee =

Located on the Mississippi River, the metropolitan area of Memphis is one of the largest in the Southeastern United States, ranking 42nd in the United States according to the 2010 census. The city has historically been one of the largest shipping hubs in the Mid-South, dating back to the Civil War, when the port was one of the largest on the Mississippi River and served as a shipping hub for the Confederacy.

As transportation methods developed, Memphis has continued to hold significance as a transportation hub. Now the city is home to the second largest cargo airport in the world, Memphis International Airport, and the world's busiest domestic airport with 3.9 million metric tonnes. Memphis International Airport and Memphis have had huge significance in the railroad industry. The city has the 3rd largest rail center in the U.S. behind Chicago and St. Louis. It is also one of only four U.S. cities with five Class 1 railroads.

Because Memphis has been such an important city for transportation and shipping, it is attractive to businesses, especially those producing goods shipped nationwide. Three Fortune 500 companies, FedEx, AutoZone and International Paper Co. call Memphis home. These significant businesses have brought a large manufacturing industry. Of the 607,900 jobs in Memphis in July 2014, 209,900 are in the manufacturing and transportation industries, around 34.5 percent.

Over the years, the city has become less dependent on its manufacturing and transportation sectors and has diversified its economy especially in services. The Gross Domestic Product of the private sector good-producing industries have grown from $8,309 million to $11,459 million from 2003 to 2013. Over that same time period, the private sector service industries grew from $39,354 million to $48,641 million.

== Companies ==
=== Publicly traded firms headquartered in Memphis ===
- FedEx (NYSE: FDX), world's largest airfreight firm and 45th-ranked company on the Fortune 500 (2021).
- International Paper (NYSE: IP), manufactures paper products and the 141st-ranked company on the Fortune 500 (2021).
- AutoZone Incorporated (NYSE: AZO), operates over 6,900 auto parts stores in the United States and Mexico and the 248th-ranked company on the Fortune 500 (2021).
- First Horizon National Corporation (NYSE: FHN), operates First Tennessee and First Horizon bank, the 686th-ranked company on the Fortune 500 (2021).
- Sylvamo Corporation (NYSE: SLVM), paper product manufacturer that was spun off from international Paper in 2021, the 727th-ranked company on the Fortune 500 (2023).
- Mueller Industries (NYSE: MLI), fabricates metal tubes and fittings and the 861st-ranked company on the Fortune 500 (2021).
- Terminix (NYSE: TMX), one of the world's largest pest control companies and the 923rd-ranked company on the Fortune 500 (2021).
- Mid-America Apartments (NYSE: MAA), real estate investment trust owning apartment communities.
- Frontdoor, Inc. (Nasdaq: FTDR), technology-based home repair and maintenance services.

=== Private firms headquartered in Memphis ===
- Baker, Donelson, Bearman, Caldwell & Berkowitz, law firm
- Barnhart Crane and Rigging, specialty heavy lifting and heavy transport
- Belz Enterprises, develops, owns and manages real estate throughout the United States and Puerto Rico
- Guardsmark, security and investigation firm
- Katt Worldwide Logistics, a transportation firm
- Lenny's Sub Shop, restaurant chain
- Malco Theatres, an operator of movie theatres
- Ozark Motor Lines, a transportation company
- Varsity Brands, manufactures uniforms and runs camps
- American Residential Services, also known as ARS/Rescue Rooter
- City Gear, a clothing store selling streetwear clothing.

=== Major divisions or operations ===
- Allenburg Cotton, part of Louis Dreyfus, trades and brokers cotton, along with shipping, ginning, and warehousing.
- Cargill Cotton, part of Cargill Incorporated, trades and brokers cotton, along with shipping, ginning, and warehousing.
- Carrier plant for central air conditioning, located in Collierville. Carrier is part of United Technologies.
- Evergreen Packaging, packaging company owned by Reynolds Group Holdings
- Information Technology world headquarters and data center for Hilton Hotels is located on Crossover Lane.
- Morgan Keegan & Company, Inc. investment banking firm, subsidiary of Raymond James Financial, Inc., Headquartered in the eponymous tower at Jefferson and Front streets in downtown Memphis.
- Nike, 1,000,000-square-foot (93,000 m^{2}) footwear distribution center and other distribution facilities.
- Nucor Steel Memphis Inc. manufactures special bar quality carbon steel in a plant on Paul R. Lowry Road.
- Orthopaedic Reconstruction and Trauma division world headquarters of Smith & Nephew is located on Brooks Road.
- Spinal and Biologics division headquarters of Medtronic is located in Memphis.
- Williams-Sonoma, Inc., primary global distribution facilities.
- Y&S Candies plant, which makes Twizzlers and Bubble Yum chewing gum, is located on Kansas Street. Y&S is part of The Hershey Company.

=== Nonprofits ===
- Ducks Unlimited
- Methodist Healthcare, operates seven hospitals, multiple home health agencies and outpatient clinics
- St. Jude Children's Research Hospital, pediatric treatment and research facility.

=== Former major companies ===
- Union Planters Bank (1869–2004), financial institution and multi-state bank holding company (founded in 1869, acquired by Regions in 2004)
- National Bank of Commerce (1873–2005), regional bank holding company (founded in 1873, acquired by SunTrust in 2005)
- Schering-Plough Corporation became defunct in (1908–2009). It is now a subsidiary of Merck & Co. Abe Plough founded Plough, Incorporated in Memphis in 1908. In 1971, the Schering Corporation merged with Plough, Inc.
- Piggly Wiggly (1916–1939), national supermarket chain with 2,660 locations in 1932 (founded in 1916, relocated to Jacksonville in 1939)
- The Ford Motor Company built cars in Memphis from 1913 until 1958/59.
- Firestone Tire and Rubber Company operated a tire plant in North Memphis from 1936 to 1982. The plant made 100 million tires.
- The International Harvester Company manufacturing plant opened in 1947 and closed in 1985. The plant made cotton harvesting equipment and Farm Tillage equipment. It once had 1,000 employees.
- Wright Medical Group (1950–2016), a global medical device manufacturer (founded in 1950, relocated to Amsterdam in 2016)
- Holiday Inn (1952–1985), worldwide chain of hotels and formerly motels (founded in 1952, relocated to Atlanta in 1985)
- Fred's (1953–2019), discount convenience store chain with 557 locations in 2019 (relocated to Memphis from Coldwater, MS in 1953, declared bankruptcy in 2019).
- Perkins & Marie Callender's LLC (1958–2019), owners of the Perkins and Marie Callender's restaurant chains (declared bankruptcy in 2019 and purchased by Atlanta-based Huddle House, Inc.)
- GTx Incorporated (1997–2019), pharmaceutical company (founded in 1997, merged with Oncternal Therapeutics in 2019)
- EdR (2004–2018), founded as the Education Realty Trust, a real estate investment trust owning 43 off-campus student housing properties across the United States in 2012. (founded in 2004, acquired by Greystar in 2018).
- Verso Corporation (2006–2017), global paper products manufacturer (split from International Paper in 2006, declared bankruptcy in 2016 and relocated to Miamisburg, OH in 2017)
- ServiceMaster (2007–2020), commercial cleaning services company (relocated to Memphis from Chicago in 2007, split with Terminix in 2020 and relocated to Atlanta).
- Chicago Bridge & Iron Company and General Electric built large nuclear reactor pressure vessels and other large structures in Memphis.

== Government entities ==
- Internal Revenue Service, two service centers: Accounts Management Center and Compliance Service Center.
- Memphis Light, Gas and Water ("MLG&W") is also one of the largest municipal utilities in the United States.
- Naval Support Activity Mid-South (Millington)
- Regional Medical Center at Memphis (The Med), an acute-care teaching hospital operated by Shelby County.

== Entertainment industry ==
The entertainment and film industry has also developed in recent years in the city. Major motion pictures filmed in Memphis include Making the Grade (1984), U2: Rattle & Hum, (1988) Mystery Train (1989), Great Balls of Fire! (1989), Trespass (1991), The Firm (1993), A Family Thing (1996), The People vs. Larry Flynt (1996), The Rainmaker (1997), Cast Away (2000), The Queens of Comedy (2001), 21 Grams (2003), Hustle & Flow (2005), Walk the Line (2005), Forty Shades of Blue (2005), Black Snake Moan (2007), Nothing But the Truth (2008), and The Blind Side (2009).
