= Peabody Place =

Mixed-use redevelopment project in Memphis, Tennessee

Coordinates: 35.1406°N 90.0527°W

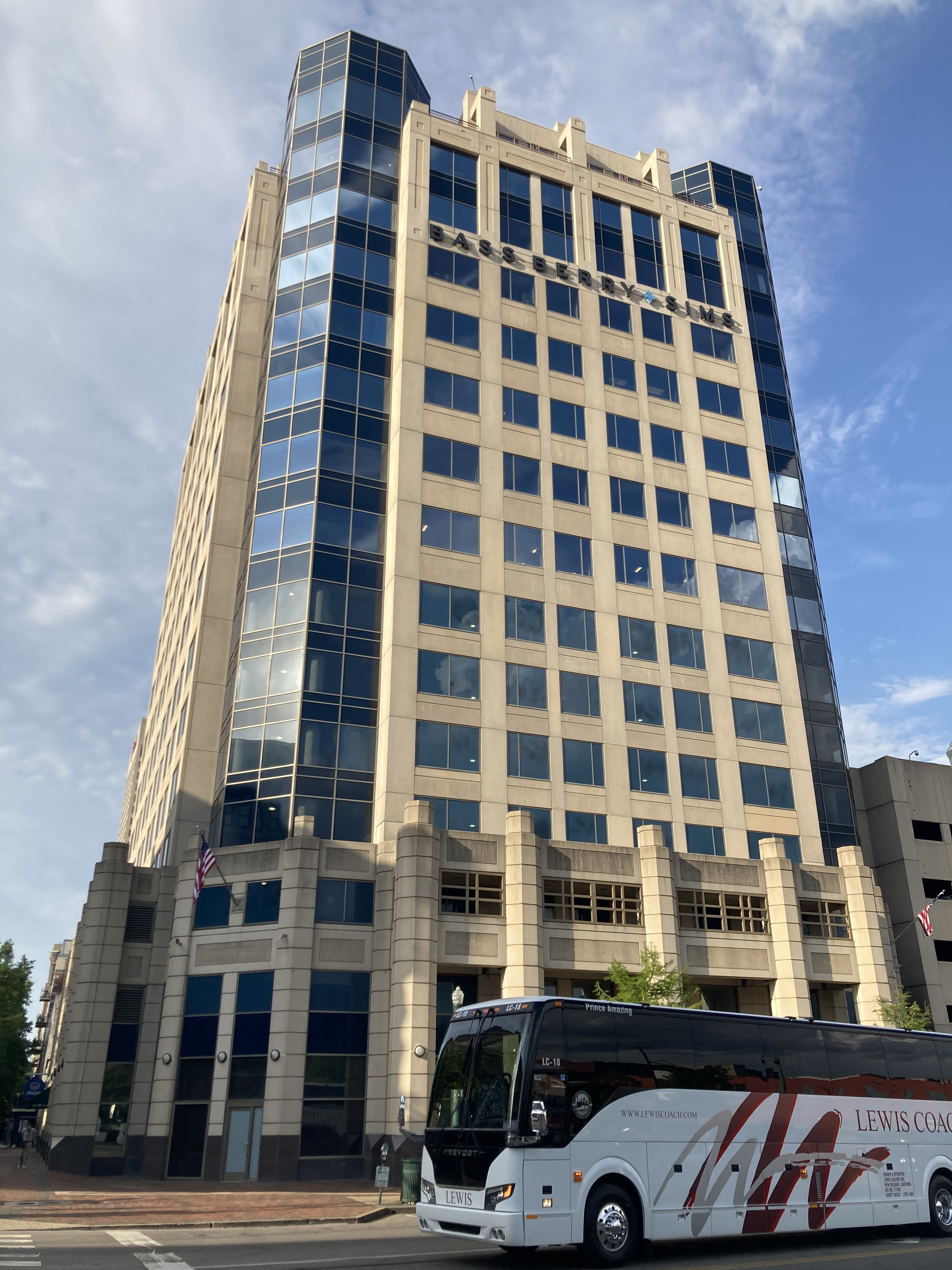
- Tower at Peabody Place in 2025
- Interactive map of Peabody Place
- Location: Downtown Memphis, Tennessee
- Opening: 2001

Companies
- Developer: Belz Enterprises
- Proposed: 1984

Peabody Place is a mixed-use residential, retail, and office redevelopment project located in Downtown Memphis, Tennessee that covers eight city blocks. The shopping mall opened in 2001, but closed in after eleven years of operation. It was later converted into office space for ServiceMaster.

== History ==
In 1984, the Belz family announced plans to redevelop four blocks of Downtown Memphis adjacent to the Peabody Hotel, which it owned, into a mixed-use development including a shopping mall, offices, and residential units. In 1986, the United States Department of Housing and Urban Development awarded a $9.7 million grant for the project, helping fund the initial $90 million phase. The first building was to appear in 1993.

An enclosed mall, with 300,000 square feet (28,000 m^{2}) of space, opened in 2001 and was initially anchored by a 22-screen Muvico cinema, Jillian's, and Tower Records; other chain stores, such as Ann Taylor and Gap joined. While the mall was initially successful, anchor tenants such as the theater were unable to compete with more convenient suburban alternatives that were perceived as safer, due to their demographics. The Jillian's was a 60,000-square-foot (5,600 m^{2}), three-floor entertainment lounge. Tourists visiting Downtown were also not particularly interested in visiting a mall that had stores similar to those available in their hometowns, so that clientele did not materialize either.

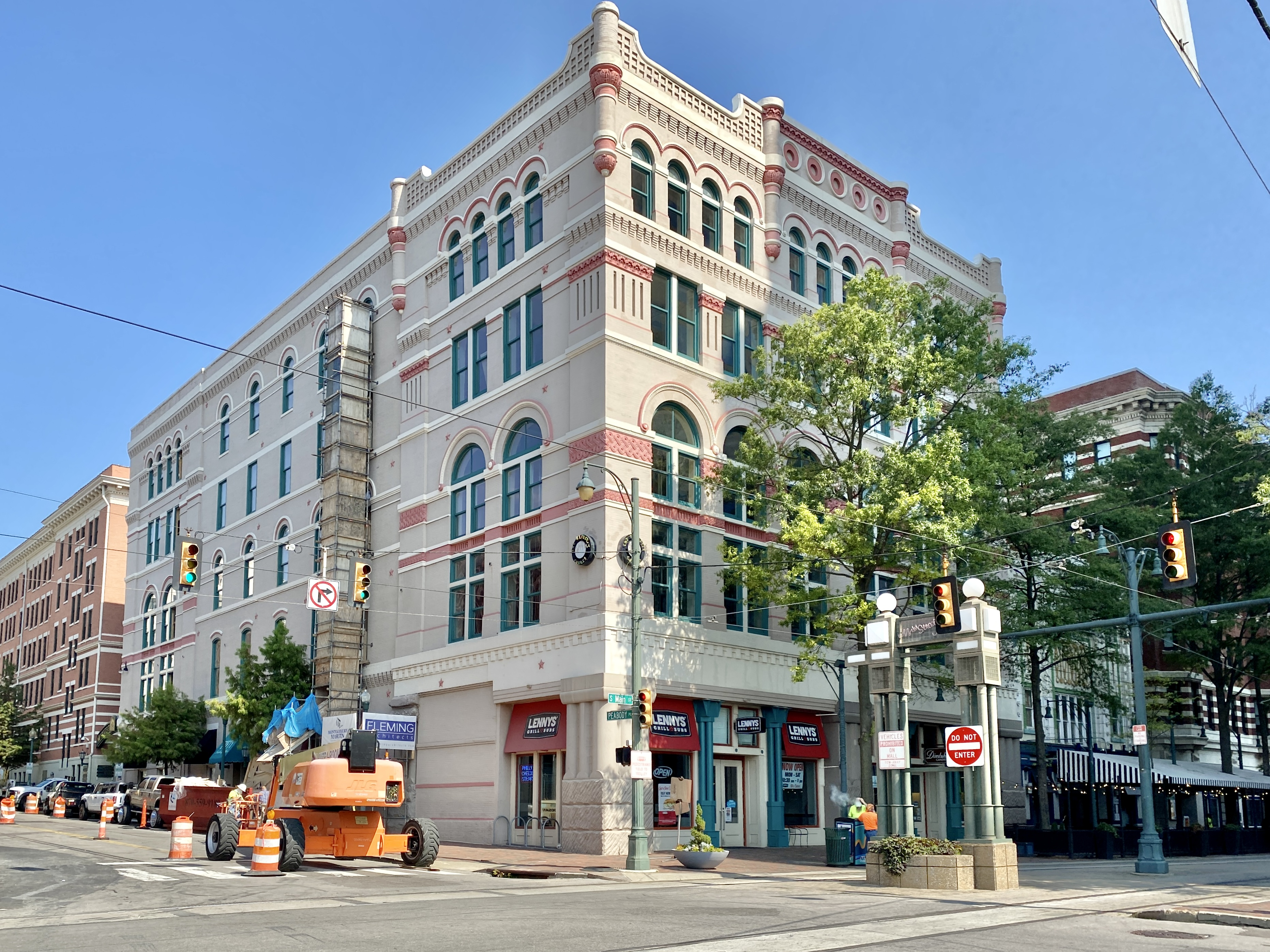
The Riley Building in 2023

Over several years, most of the stores in the indoor mall were closed. A few were replaced by new establishments, such as Encore restaurant, and Primetime Sports Bar, but those were also unable to gain traction and eventually closed also. While the rest of Peabody Place and the Downtown area in general had been performing well, the enclosed mall failed. Many considered the fundamental concept of an enclosed mall to be somewhat antiquated by the turn of the 21st century and particularly inappropriate in dense urban areas, criticizing developer Belz Enterprises, a company historically specializing in suburban properties, for its seeming lack of urban expertise.

In late 2005 the Encore Restaurant and Bar opened at 150 Peabody Place. In November 2006 Muvico closed eight of its screens. Afterwards, Ann Taylor Loft moved from Peabody Place to Germantown, Tennessee and Tower Records went into liquidation. The Jillian's had higher sales in 2007 than in 2006, and Owen Reed, the assistant general manager, said that business was robust during games occurred at the FedEx Forum and while concerts took place in Downtown Memphis. Reed said "We dictate the volume at this mall. With the exception of the movie theater, we define foot traffic."

By January 2008, the second floor of the retail area was almost entirely vacant, and Sydnie's Gifts and Walson's Jewelers announced that it was closing. In 2008, the Muvico theater shut down. Belz announced plans to convert the space into a 163-suite luxury hotel, a separate sister property to adjacent the Peabody Hotel. The idea was put on hold by the late-2000s recession.

In February 2012, the mall officially closed to the public, while the untouched interior of the vacant mall was still visible from the street until June 2016.

In 2016, ServiceMaster announced a relocation of its global headquarters to the former mall space, marking an end to years of vacancy. Renovations to convert the building into office space were completed in 2018. In 2021, ServiceMaster moved its offices to Atlanta after Terminix became a separate company to focus on pest control. Terminix and American Home Shield remained in their offices at 150 Peabody Place.

== Buildings ==
Peabody Place covers a dense variety of spaces, ranging from the restored historic Peabody Hotel to the Center for Southern Folklore. The area encompasses some two million square feet and is connected by skywalks, corridors and trolley stations.

Tourist attractions nearby include Beale Street, FedExForum, the Orpheum Theatre and AutoZone Park. The project's new and restored historic buildings include a 15-story modern office tower, two apartment projects, two museums, and numerous restaurants.
