= Molly Maid =

American cleaning company

- Type: Subsidiary
- Industry: Cleaning
- Founded: 1979; 47 years ago in Mississauga, Canada
- Founder: Adrienne and Chris Stringer
- Headquarters: Irving, Texas, United States
- Number of locations: 400+ worldwide
- Area served: United Kingdom; Canada; Japan; Portugal; United States
- Products: Molly Maid cleaning handbook
- Parent: Neighborly
- Website: mollymaid.co.uk; mollymaid.com

Molly Maid is an American cleaning company that operates a multi-national franchise with over 400 franchisees worldwide. It is a subsidiary of Neighborly.

As of 2012, it was listed on the Franchise 500 and considered one of America's Top Global Franchises by Entrepreneur magazine.

== History ==
Molly Maid was founded in Mississauga, Canada in 1979 by Adrienne and Chris Stringer The company was named after the character Molly Brown from the 1964 film The Unsinkable Molly Brown.

As of 2012, the company had over 400 active franchises worldwide. Molly Maid expanded into the United States in 1984.

== Ms. Molly Foundation ==
The anti-domestic violence Ms. Molly Foundation, launched in 1996, collects money and goods for safe houses and shelters for victims of domestic violence.

Donation totals by year:

- 2008 – $127,500
- 2009 – $146,900
- 2010 – $167,836
- 2012 – $236,000
- 2013 – $319,000
- 2019 – $234,000
- 2022 – $224,000
- 2023 – $204,000
- 2024 – $314,000

== See also ==
- List of cleaning companies
