= List of cleaning companies =

This is a list of notable cleaning companies. Cleaning is the process of removing unwanted substances, such as dirt, infectious agents, and other impurities, from an object or environment. Cleaning occurs in various commercial, industrial, environmental, and domestic contexts, which differ in scale and requirements. Examples include commercial cleaning, housekeeping, terminal cleaning (in healthcare settings) and environmental remediation (the removal of pollution or contaminants from the natural environment). Some cleaning companies perform hazardous waste cleanup.

== Cleaning companies ==
- Chem-Dry – a carpet, tile, wood, and upholstery cleaner based in Logan, Utah.
- Clean Harbors – a provider of environmental, energy and industrial services, including hazardous waste cleaning services and disposal.
- Handy – an online two-sided marketplace for residential cleanings founded in 2012 with services in United States, United Kingdom, and Canada.
- Helpling – formerly Hassle.com, a European online marketplace for household services.
- Homejoy – a former online platform which connected customers with home service providers, including house cleaners and handymen.
- ISS A/S – a facility services company founded in Copenhagen, Denmark in 1901.
- Jani-King – an American chain and franchise of cleaning services.
- Merry Maids – a residential cleaning service franchisor founded in 1979, acquired by ServiceMaster in 1988, with franchises in the United States, Canada and the United Kingdom.
- Molly Maid – an internationally franchised domestic cleaning company.
- New Britain Dry Cleaning Corporation – a New Britain, Connecticut-based company founded in 1912.
- ServiceMaster Clean – a franchisor selling commercial and residential cleaning franchisees in the United States, Canada, and 10 other countries.
- Spotless Group Holdings – an Australian holding company that includes commercial facility cleaning services in Australia and New Zealand.
- Superior Rug Cleaning – founded in 1946, later absorbed Adams & Sweet which was founded in 1856.
- TaskRabbit – an online and mobile marketplace, that includes cleaning services, founded in 2008.

== See also ==
- List of cleaning products
- Lists of companies
