= Superior Rug Cleaning =

Company based in Springfield, Massachusetts

- Company type: Private
- Industry: Rug cleaning
- Founded: 1946; 80 years ago in Springfield, Massachusetts, United States
- Headquarters: Springfield, Massachusetts
- Website: www.superiorrugcleaning.com

Superior Rug Cleaning is a rug cleaning company based in Springfield, Massachusetts.

== History ==
The company was founded in 1946, but since then has absorbed the John Leavitt Rug Cleaning company (founded in 1947 in Bloomfield, Connecticut), and owns and operates Adams and Swett / Albany Carpet Cleaning. The company (including its Adams and Swett subsidiary) specializes in cleaning and restoring oriental rugs.

Adams and Swett was founded in Boston in 1856 by Freedom Samuel Adams and William Swett, catering to the new haute bourgeoisie fashion for oriental rugs coming into the port from China and elsewhere, often in clipper ships. Adams and Swett has been in continuous operation since then and through them Superior Rug Cleaning traces its corporate history back to 1856.

== Advertising ==
Adams and Swett was infamous in the mid-twentieth century for its long-running radio commercials ("How many cookies did Andrew eat? Andrew ate eight thousand; how do you keep your carpets clean? Call ANdrew 8-8000") voiced by Judy Valentine.

== See also ==
- ServiceMaster Clean
- List of cleaning companies
