= Mr. Handyman =

American home maintenance franchise

Mr. Handyman International, LLC
- Type: Subsidiary
- Industry: Home Maintenance
- Founded: Chelmsford, Massachusetts (June 1996)
- Founder: David Lavalle
- Services: Home maintenance housecalls
- Parent: Neighborly
- Website: mrhandyman.com

Mr. Handyman International, LLC is a franchise business that provides handyman and remodeling services for homeowners and commercial locations. It is a subsidiary of Neighborly. The company president is Ron Shimek. It operates in the United States and Canada.

== History ==
The company was founded in Chelmsford, Massachusetts in June 1996 by David Lavalle under the corporate name Mr. Handyman, Inc. The business concept was purchased by Service Brands International, a Michigan-based franchiser in 2000 and franchising efforts began that same year. Neighborly (then-named The Dwyer Group) acquired Service Brands International and their affiliated franchise brands in 2015.

== Business model ==
The business operates as a franchise. There is a headquarters that handles advertising, public relations, training, signage, and other matters such as information technology. For example, decisions such as scheduling software are made at the corporate level, but used by individual franchise owners to expedite customer service; in 2009, it uses software by Servant Systems to manage customer relations, scheduling, customer invoicing. Under the franchise model, individuals can buy a right to an exclusive Mr. Handyman franchise territory with permission to operate with the brand name Mr. Handyman provided they observe specific rules regarding how to run the business. A Mr. Handyman franchise agreement typically gives a franchise owner the exclusive right to take service calls within a clearly delineated geographical area. A franchise costs approximately $110,000 with a franchise fee of $14,900, according to Sara Faiwell, a spokeswoman for the corporate firm. Some see a benefit of franchising as "entrepreneurship under the safety net of a tried-and-true business umbrella" but forecast a 1.2 percent decrease in franchise businesses during the 2008-2009 recession.

In 2005, according to a survey released by the Washington-based International Franchise Association showed 909,000 franchised establishments in the United States employing some 11 million people. Franchises offer training, advertising and information technology support, lower procurement costs and access to a network of established operators. One Lehman Brothers executive, after being let go from the Wall Street firm, bought a Union, New Jersey Mr. Handyman franchise.

Individual franchise owners hire handyman workers which they call "technicians", give them trucks, and sometimes provide tools, and pay them on an hourly basis to perform work. They do background checks on prospective employees. The firm provides insurance coverage in case of accidents or damage. Technicians do a range of services including tile work, painting, and wallpapering. Services offered include kitchen installations to tiling to laying brick. Typically firms charge an hourly rate averaging around $100/hour; one firm charges $88 per hour. The firm targets a work category which full-fledged remodelers and contractors find unprofitable, that is, projects which are too small for general contractors to find profitable. Trends such as a "poverty of time" and a "glut of unhandy husbands" have spurred the business. A trend is that fewer homeowners are inclined to do fix-up jobs; one reporter commented "my family's fix-it gene petered out before it reached my generation." Mr. Handyman pitches clients by asking prospective customers about their To Do lists. The firm does odd jobs, carpentry, and repairs.

== Company performance ==
In 2023, there were 325 local franchises in 39 states, according to one New York Times reporter. Alex Roberts, then president of Mr. Handyman, offered advice for homeowners such as tips about insulating which sometimes appears in newspapers and which helps publicize the company. One estimate is that revenues in 2009 were between $75 million and $100 million. The firm had 250 franchised units in the United States and Canada as of 2009, according to a press release.
