= Light industry =

Type of industry

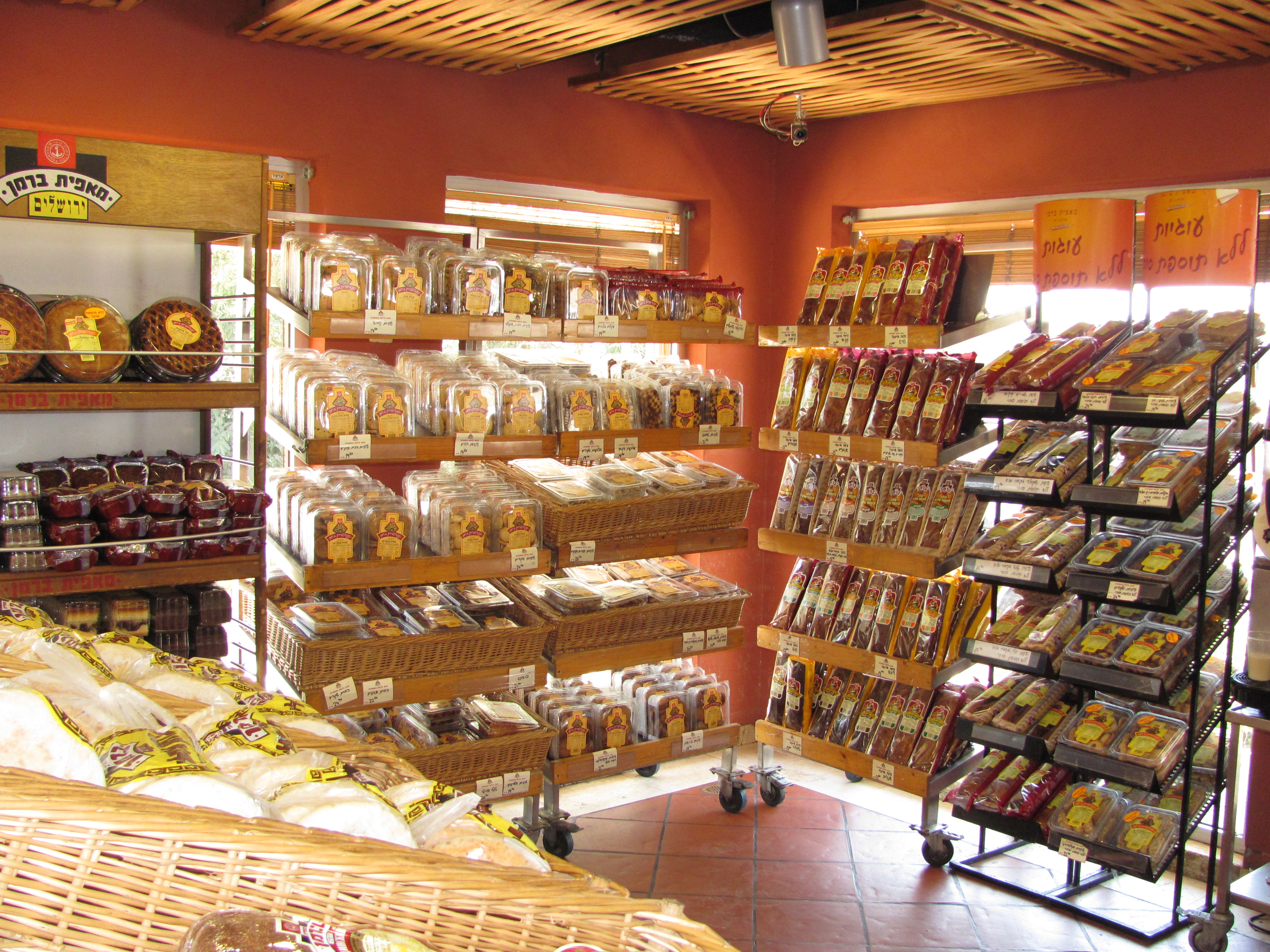
Bakery store

Light industry are industries that usually are less capital-intensive than heavy industries and are more consumer-oriented than business-oriented, as they typically produce smaller consumer goods. Most light industry products are produced for end users rather than as intermediates for use by other industries. Light industry facilities typically have a smaller environmental impact than those associated with heavy industry. For that reason, zoning laws are more likely to permit light industry near residential areas.

One definition states that light industry is a "manufacturing activity that uses moderate amounts of partially processed materials to produce items of relatively high value per unit weight".

== Characteristics ==
Compared to heavy industries, light industries require fewer raw materials, space, and power. While light industry typically causes little pollution, particularly compared to heavy industry, some light industries can cause significant pollution or risk of contamination. For example, electronics manufacturing, itself often a light industry, can create potentially harmful levels of lead or chemical wastes in soil without proper handling of solder and waste products (such as cleaning and degreasing agents used in the manufacture).

== Industry sectors ==
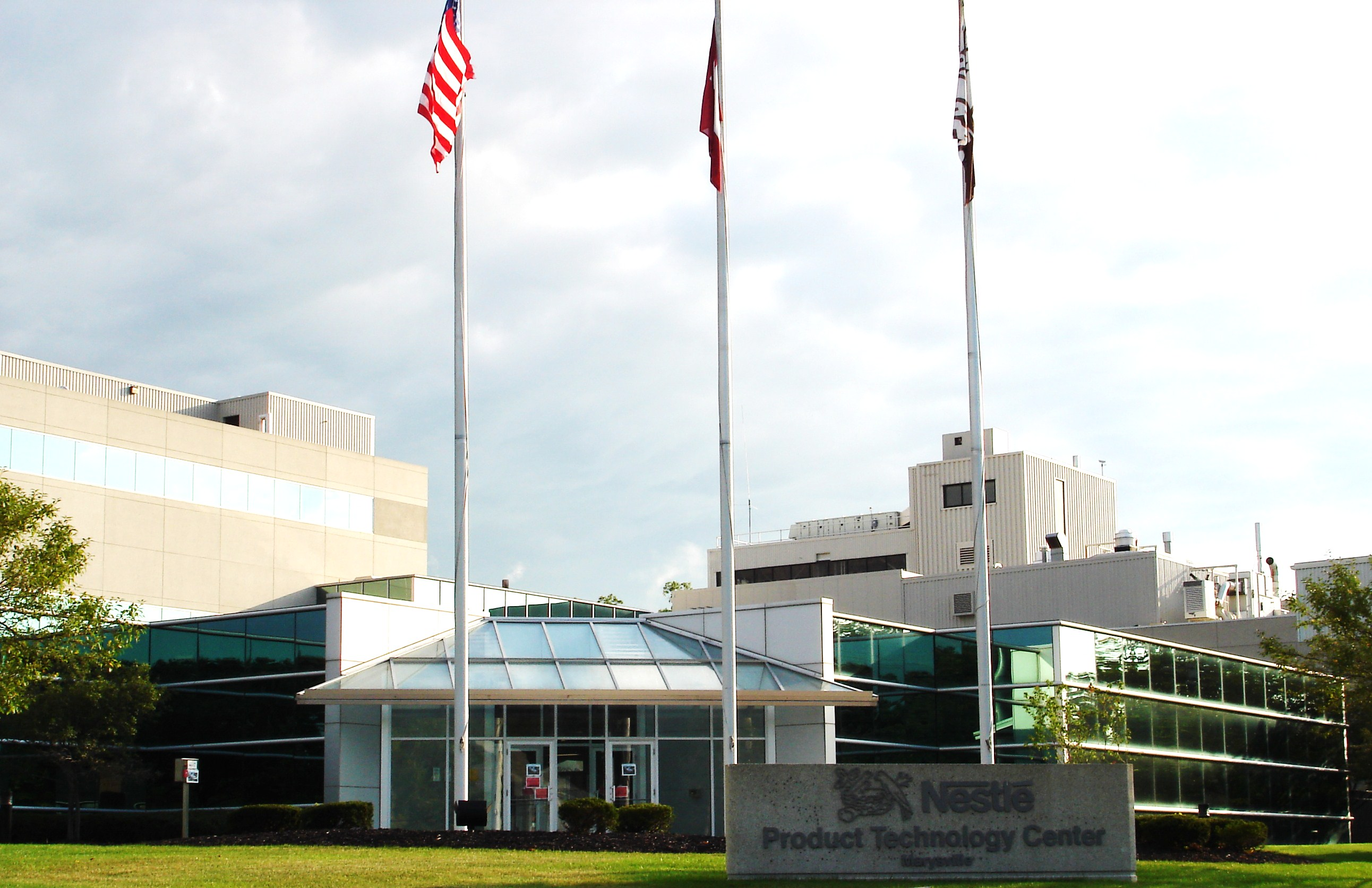
Marysville Nestle R&D

- Food industry
- Paper making
- Plastic
- Leather industry
- Textiles
- Household electric appliances

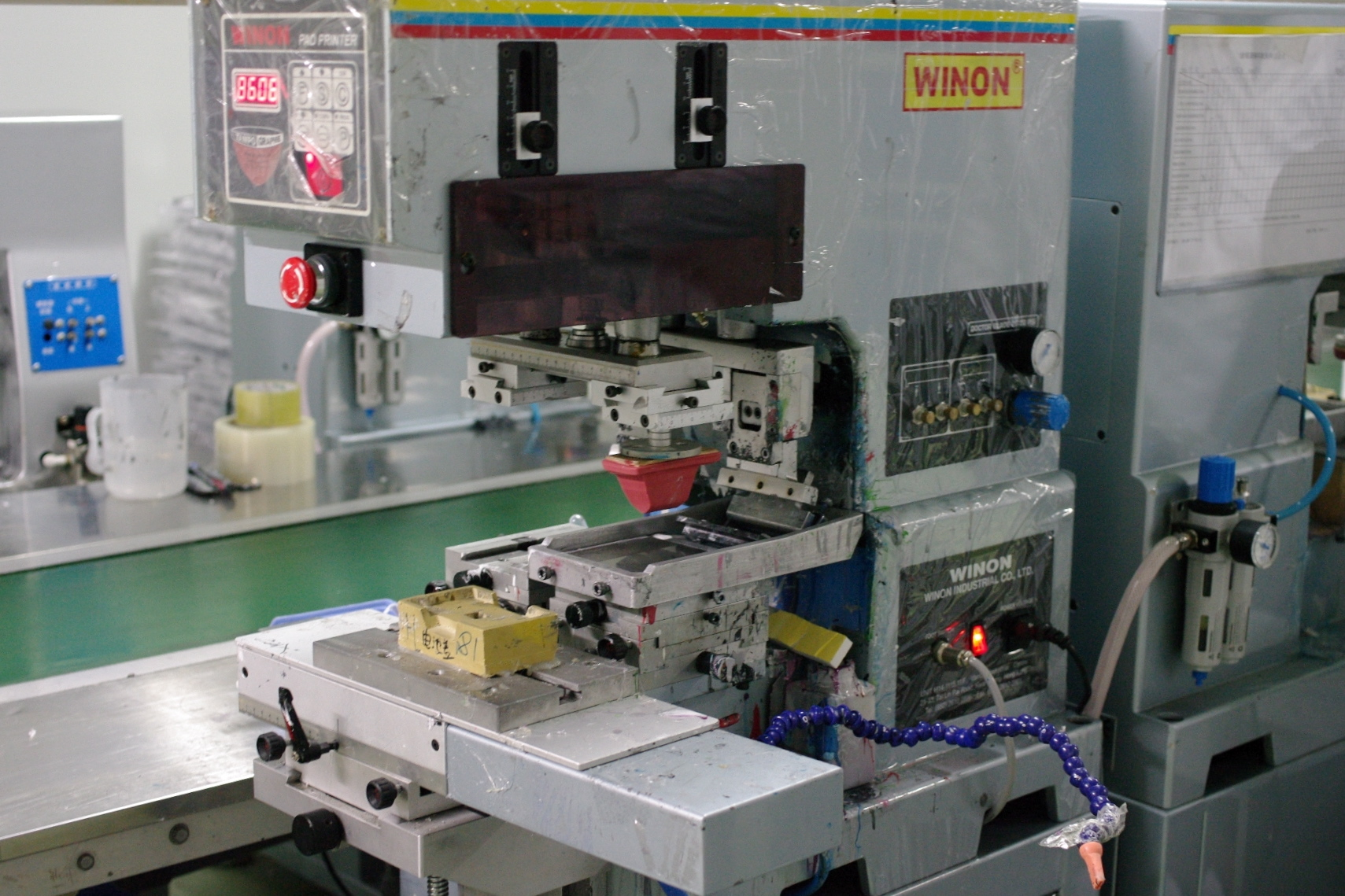
A manufacturing device typical of light industry (a print machine).

== General-use products ==
- Kitchen and dining products
- Beauty and personal care
- Home textiles
- Cleaning and storage
- Clock, watch, and eyewear
- Gardening
- Household sundries
- Advertising and packaging

== History ==
The Oxford English Dictionary traces the use of the term "light industry" from 1916 onwards.

Within the later stages of the Industrial Revolution, the development of light industry tended to precede that of heavy industry.
