= Housekeeping =

Management of duties and chores involved in the running of a household

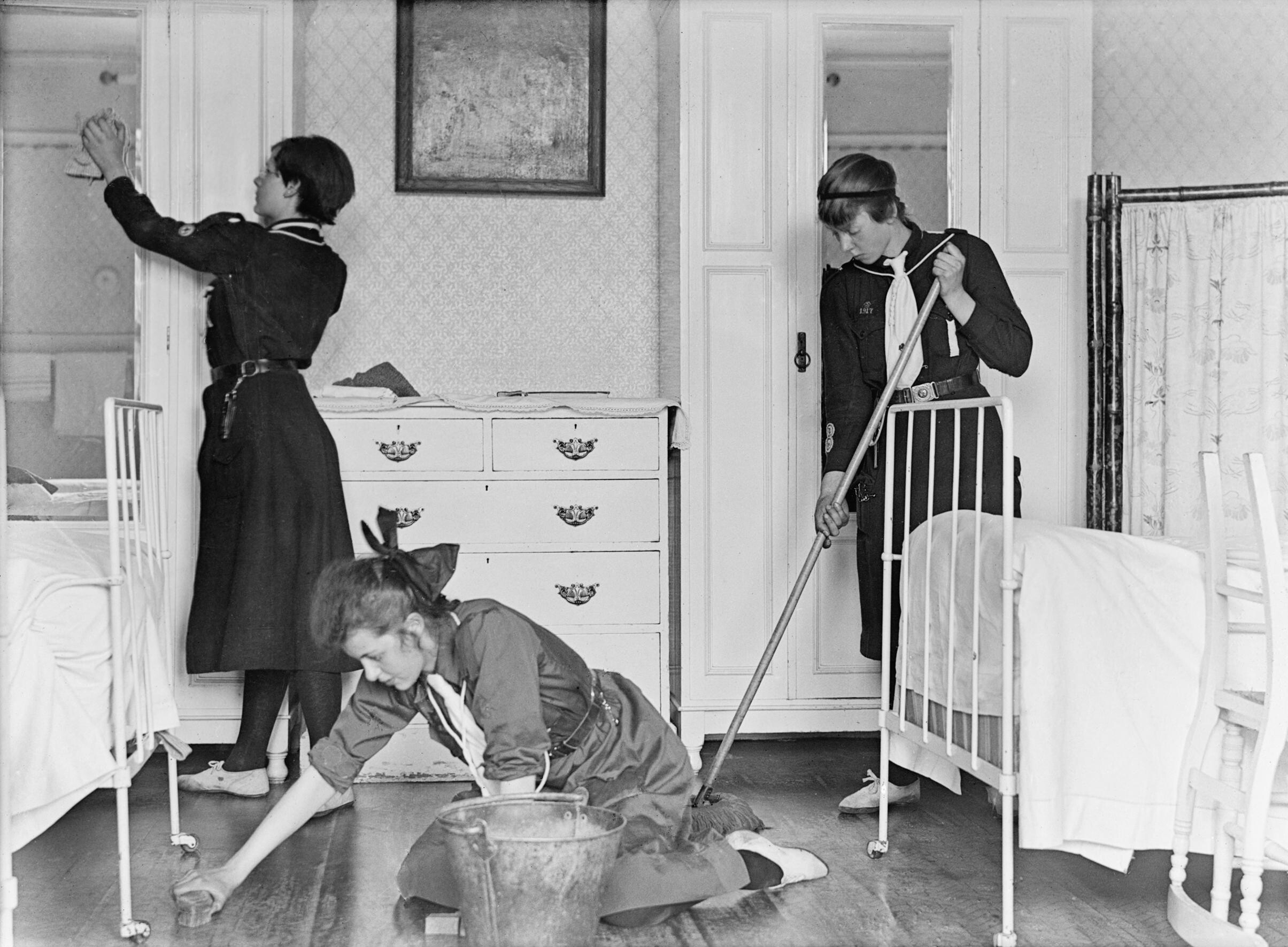
Girl guides cleaning a room, 1917

Housekeeping is the management and routine support activities of running and maintaining an organized physical institution occupied or used by people, like a house, ship, hospital, business or factory. The term may refer to cleaning, cooking, organization, shopping, and bill payment. The term is also used to refer to the money allocated for such use. These tasks may be performed by members of the household, or by persons hired for the purpose. In the United States, the term is associated with institutional housekeeping at hotels and resorts but may also refer to domestic housekeeping. Housekeeper is a broader role than a cleaner, who is focused only on the cleaning aspect. The term may also refer to the maintenance of computer storage systems, records, etc.

A housekeeper is a person employed to manage a household and the domestic staff. According to the 1861 Victorian era Mrs. Beeton's Book of Household Management, the housekeeper is second in command in the house and "except in large establishments, where there is a house steward, the housekeeper must consider herself as the immediate representative of her mistress".

Domestic housekeeping refers to housekeeping by or for private households, while institutional housekeeping for commercial and other institutions providing shelter or lodging, such as hotels, resorts, inns, boarding houses, dormitories, hospitals and prisons. Additional concepts include workplace housekeeping and industrial housekeeping, which are part of occupational health and safety processes.

== Scope ==
=== Domestic housekeeping ===
Domestic housekeeping or residential housekeeping refers to the cleaning and maintaining of a private residence, home or apartment. This can include tasks such as dusting, vacuuming, laundry, and disinfecting surfaces. It may also involve organizing and decluttering living spaces, as well as making beds and changing linens. This type of housekeeping is sometimes performed by a professional cleaning service or by the homeowners themselves. The frequency of housekeeping tasks may vary depending on the size of the residence, the number of occupants, and individual preferences.

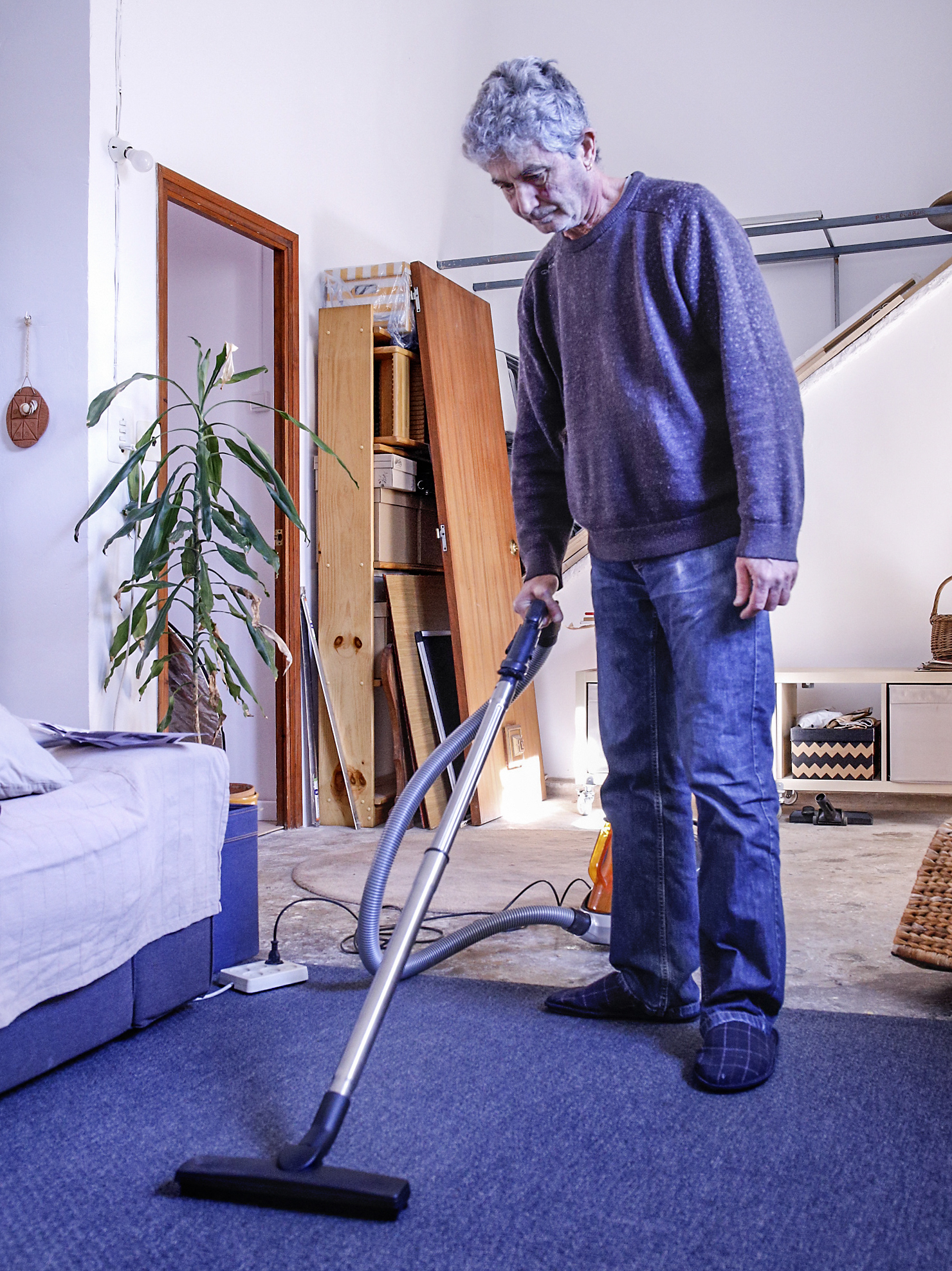
A man vacuums a floor, a common housekeeping task

=== Professional housekeeping ===
Professional cleaning services may offer a variety of services, depending on the needs and expectations of the clients. Some of the most common types are:

- Regular domestic cleaning is performed on a regular basis (e.g., weekly, biweekly, or monthly). The main purpose of this service is to maintain cleanliness in the home. A cleaner usually follows a list of tasks that cover the most important and frequently used areas of the home, such as the kitchen, bathroom, living room, and bedroom.
- One-off domestic cleanings or one-time domestic cleanings are performed only once, usually for a specific occasion or purpose (e.g., after a party, before moving in or after moving out, after a renovation, or following a large event in the home). The main purpose of this service is to restore the original condition and appearance of the home.
- Specialized domestic cleanings focus on a particular aspect or area of the home that requires extra attention or expertise. This might refer to carpet- or oven cleaning, upholstery cleaning, end-of-tenancy cleaning, or crime scene cleanup. The cleaners usually use specialized equipment and products to perform these tasks.

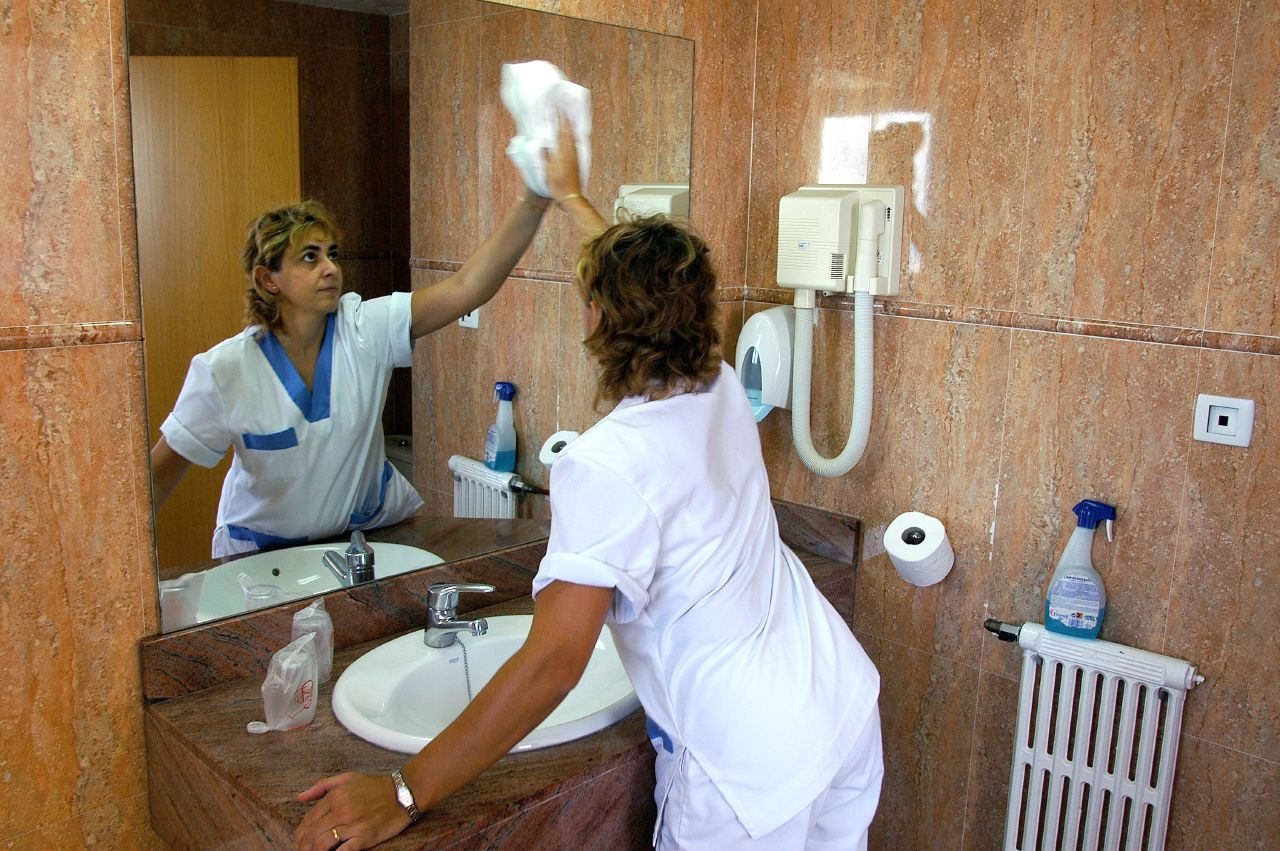
A hotel housekeeper cleaning a bathroom mirror

=== Institutional housekeeping ===
- At commercial lodging establishments (hotels, resorts, hostels, cruise ships, etc.) housekeeping refers to the department which works to provide a clean, comfortable, safe and aesthetically appealing environment for the guests. It also refers to the operational department in a hotel is responsible for these activities in relation to private rooms, public areas, elevators and stairwells. This includes changing bedding, providing clean towels, cleaning of bathrooms and tidying of the room. This department is typically in charge of laundry services. The housekeeping department does not directly generate income, and is considered a "back of house" department despite the limited direct contact with the guests.
- In communal lodging and living situations (prisons, dormitory, barracks, house shares, etc.) housekeeping may be organized formally or informally to ensure the cleanliness and safety of common spaces.
- Workplace and industrial housekeeping, sometimes called occupational safety and health, is the ongoing process of keeping the workplace clean, hygienic, orderly and free of extraneous objects and materials which may constitute hazards (e.g., body fluids, unsafe placement of items, etc.). This may include consideration of a buildings layout, safety markings, removing clutter from storage facilities, maintenance of support infrastructure, lighting, and regular inspections, and is a basic component of fire and incident prevention. In hospitals and clinics, housekeeping may refer to either the department responsible for cleanliness of patient rooms, maintenance and aesthetic upkeep of patient care areas, public areas and staff areas.

== Components of housekeeping ==
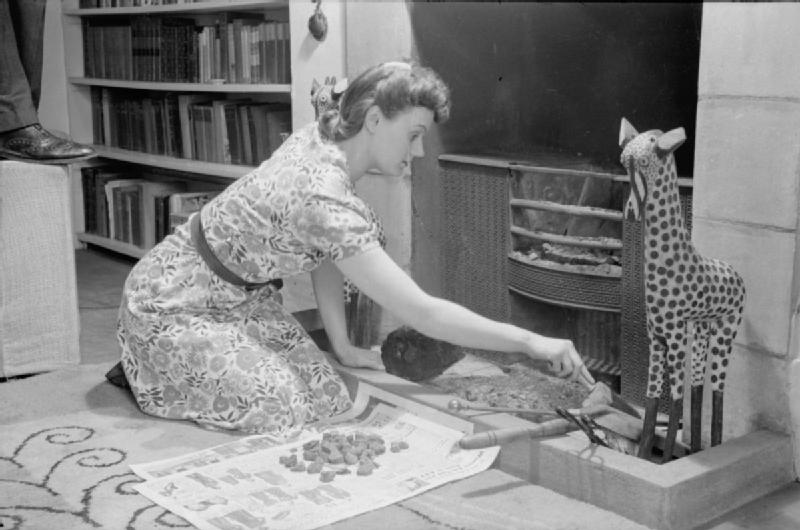
A London housewife clears ash from the grate, 1941

Housekeeping is synonymous with housecleaning. The term housecleaning is often used also figuratively in politics and business, for the removal of unwanted personnel, methods, or policies in an effort at reform or improvement. Literally, it may refer to activities like disposing of rubbish, cleaning dirty surfaces, dusting, and vacuuming. It may also involve some outdoor chores, such as removing leaves from rain gutters, washing windows, and sweeping doormats.

Concerns of the housekeeper may vary widely from place to place, both domestically and institutionally. Domestically and regionally chores have changed over time as new technologies have been adopted. For instance, the task of clearing of ash from fireplaces and ashtrays have become less common. Many housekeeping classes around the world once taught the sewing or mending of clothes. Fewer hotels now offer whole room disinfection after the peak of the COVID-19 pandemic.

=== Tidying ===
Tidying (sometimes called "decluttering") is an organization process that can include activities such as picking up and collecting items that are not in their proper storage and returning them to their allocated storage place. This process reduces the risk of damage to the items and removed the hazard they may cause for tripping and obstructing other activities. It can involve removing items like keys, books, handbags, or remote controls from tables and surfaces and putting them in their correct place. Putting out-of-place items away creates a clear space which facilitates removing dirt buildup and accessing areas that are hard to reach and clean on a regular basis. It generally does not include moving large items of furniture around to access the surfaces under or behind them, but may include putting them back where they belong after cleaning.

=== Removal of dirt and dust ===
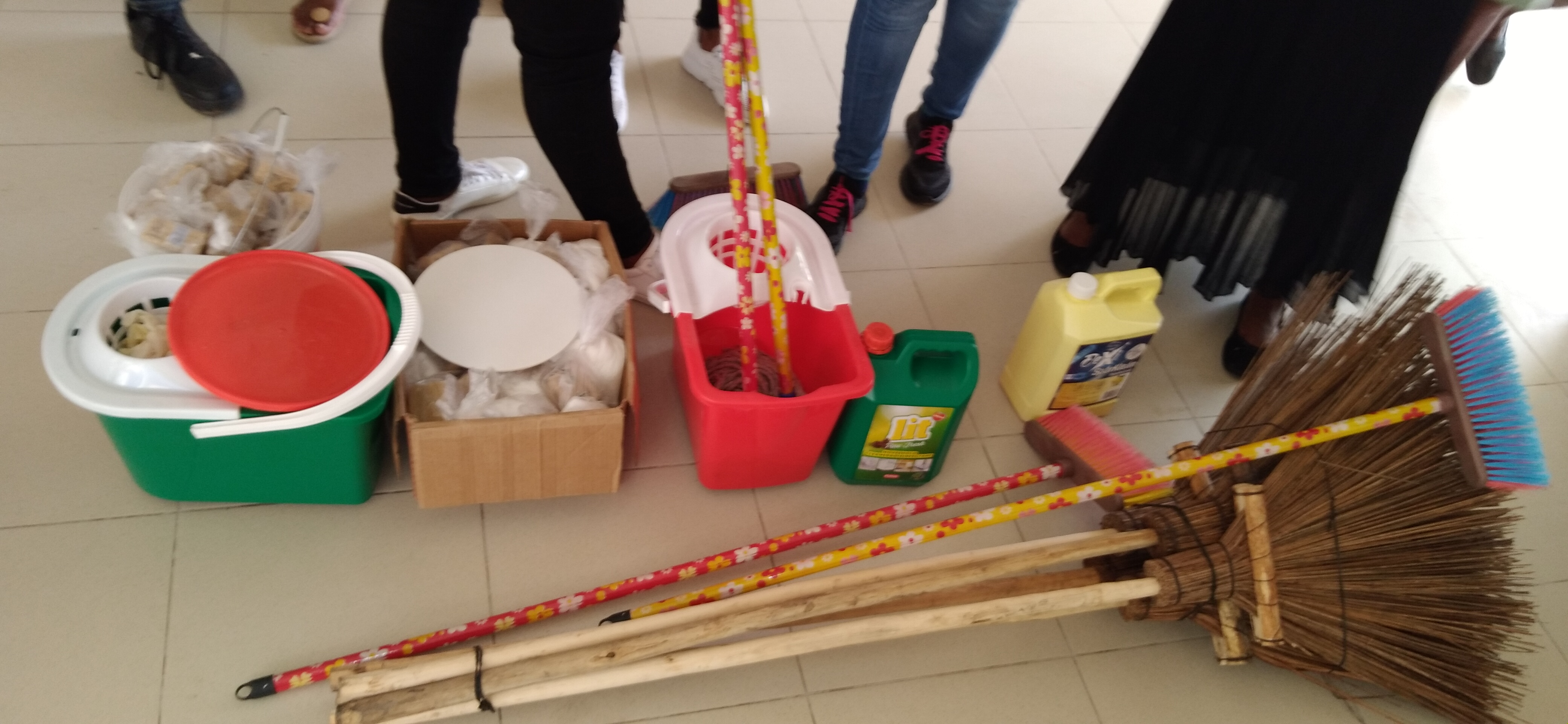
Cleaning tools vary widely from place to place, but generally include mops, brooms, and cleaning agents.

Over time dust accumulates on household surfaces and is considered unsightly. Various tools have been invented for dust removal like dust mops, feather dusters, paper, cotton or polyester dust cloths, furniture sprays and waxes, and vacuum cleaners. Vacuum cleaners often have a variety of tools to enable them to remove dirt not just from carpets and rugs, but also from hard surfaces and upholstery.

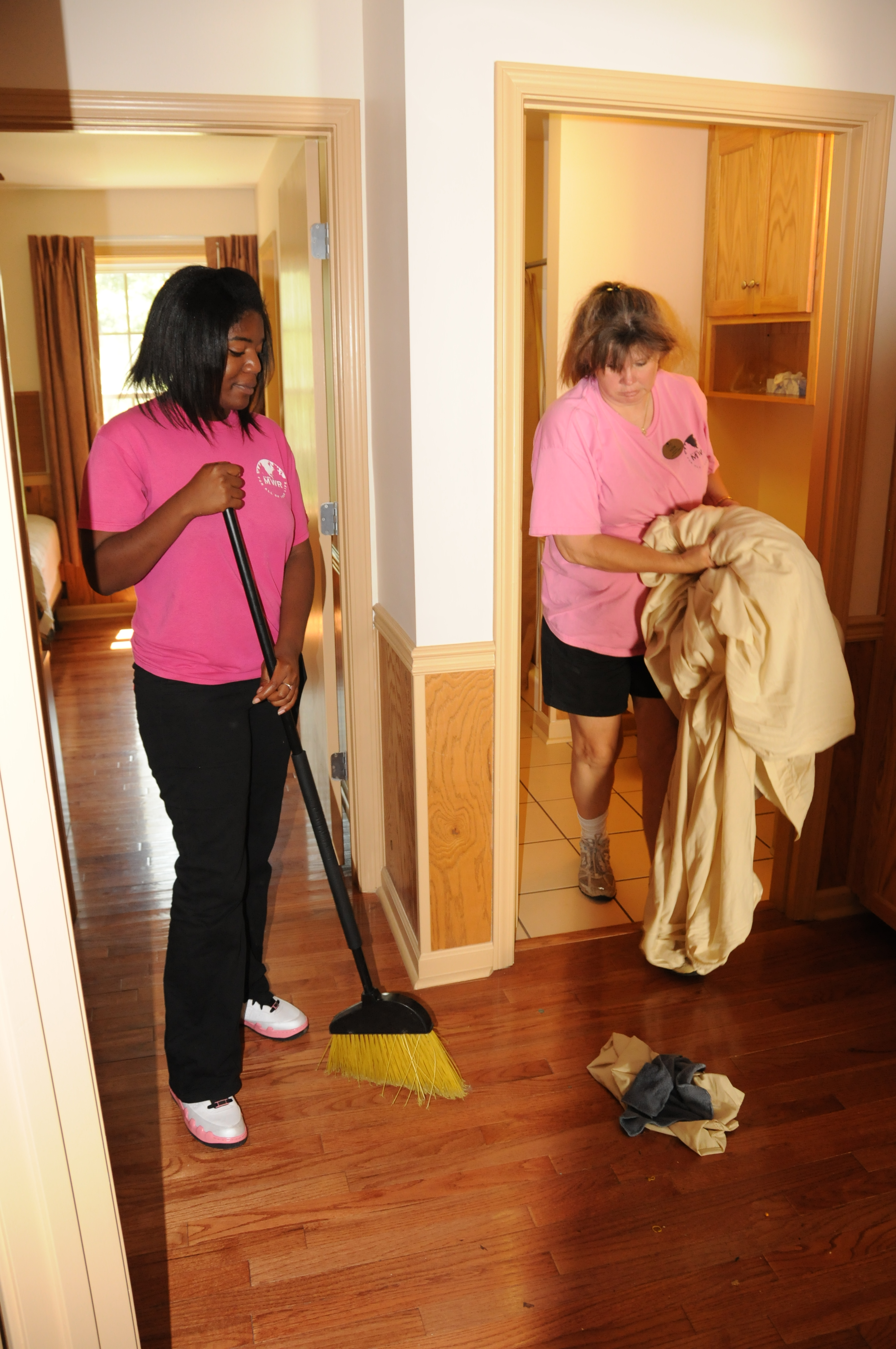
Women cleaning a cabin of the US Army

Surface cleaning can include vacuuming, scrubbing, sweeping, mopping, or disinfecting hard surfaces like floors, countertops, or tables, as well as furnishing textiles, carpeting and upholstery, cooking and eating utensils. Many household and industrial chemicals can be used in the cleaning of an area. To ensure safety, protective apparel including rubber gloves, face covers, and protective eyewear are also sometimes used when dealing with chemical cleaning products.

Disposal of rubbish is an important aspect of house cleaning. Plastic refuse bags are designed and manufactured specifically for the collection of refuse and are common in many countries, as is the reuse of plastic bags and containers for this purpose.

=== Laundry ===
Housekeeping can include the washing, folding, and packing away laundry items. Other duties may involve monitoring and changing bed linen and ironing. This may be done domestically, in barracks, or hotels.

=== Tools ===
Tools used in housecleaning include vacuums, brooms, mops and sponges, together with cleaning products such as detergents, and disinfectants. Brooms remove debris from floors and dustpans carry dust and debris swept into them, buckets hold cleaning and rinsing solutions, vacuum cleaners and carpet sweepers remove surface dust and debris, chamois leather and squeegees are used for window-cleaning, and mops are used for washing floors.

== Social significance ==
While domestic housekeeping can be seen as an objective activity that can be done by either men or women, some people have argued that housekeeping is a site of historical oppression and gender division between men and women. Housekeeping also has a role in maintaining certain parts of the capitalist economy, including the division of home and work life, as well as industries that sell chemicals and household goods.

A survey conducted by the U.S. Bureau of Labor Statistics in 2014 came to the result that approximately 43 percent of men did food preparation or cleanup on any given day, compared with approximately 70 percent of women. In addition, 20 percent of men did housekeeping chores (including cleaning and laundry) on any given day, compared to approximately 50 percent of women.

=== Death cleaning ===
The Swedish practice of döstädning ("death cleaning"), a simple living ethic and aesthetic with the primary focus of not burdening the person's heirs with their belongings, is a permanent form of household organization which also focuses on keeping only strongly valued possessions.

== See also ==
- Au pair – Helper from a foreign country working for, and living as part of, a host family
- Cleanliness – Abstract state of being clean and free from dirt
- Dishwashing – Cleaning cooking items to prevent illness
- Domestic work – Person who works within the employer's household
- Floor cleaning – Occupation
- Gardening – Practice of growing and cultivating plants
- Great house – Large and stately residence
- Home appliance – Machine for household uses
- Homemaking – Overseeing the operations of a house or estate
- Home repair – Maintenance and resolution of problems in a house
- Laundry – Washing of clothing and other textiles
- List of cleaning companies
- Maid – Female domestic worker
- Marie Kondo – Japanese organizing consultant, author, and television show host
- Njai – Dutch-Indonesian housekeepers, companions, and concubines
- Plumbing – Systems for conveying fluids
- Professional organizing – Using organizing principles to design process and organize spaces
- Sanitation – Public health conditions related to clean water and proper excreta and sewage disposal
