= Aftermath Services =

American sanitation company

Aftermath Services LLC
- Type: Private
- Industry: Crime scene cleanup
- Founded: 1996
- Fate: Rebranded to ServiceMaster BioClean®; divested in 2026 and became Aftermath Services®
- Successor: ServiceMaster BioClean®
- Headquarters: Aurora, IL
- Number of locations: 75+ locations nationwide
- Services: Crime Scene Cleanup
- Number of employees: 250+
- Website: https://www.aftermath.com

Aftermath Services, a US nationwide company, performing crime scene clean up, homicide cleanup, suicide cleanup, hoarding cleanup, unattended death cleanup, infectious disease disinfection, and other trauma cleanup and specialty biohazard cleaning services such as hoarding and tear gas cleanup. Headquartered in Aurora, IL, the company has been in business since 1996 and maintains locations serving 48 of the United States. The company pioneered its field and was the subject of a book by the same name. The company manufactures proprietary cleaning agents engineered specifically for cleaning biomatter and bodily fluids.

Aftermath Services was acquired by ServiceMaster in April 2022. In January 2025, Aftermath Services was rebranded to ServiceMaster BioClean and in May 2026, the Aftermath Services divested from ServiceMaster, becoming Aftermath Services, a privately-owned company.
