= E. Leslie Conkling =

American politician

E. Leslie Conkling (December 20, 1931 – September 16, 2014) was an American politician and educator.

Conkling was born in Princeton, Illinois. He graduated from Princeton High School. Conkling received his associate degree from Illinois Valley Community College He received his bachelor's degree in teachers education from Northern Illinois University and his master's degree in education from University of Illinois Urbana-Champaign. Conkling also studied at Indiana University Bloomington and Louisiana Tech University. He was a principal, coach, and teacher at Kempton-Cabery and Tri-Point School District. He served on the village council for Kempton and the board of trustees for and the Mona Township.

The Chair of the Republican Party in Ford County from 1978 to 1998, he and his fellow county party chairs appointed him to the Illinois House of Representatives after incumbent Thomas W. Ewing was elected to the United States House of Representatives from Illinois's 15th congressional district. Conkling took the oath of office on July 15, 1991. He was assigned to the following committees: Committees on General Services Appropriations; Housing; State Government Administration. During the 1991 decennial redistricting process, the Republican-controlled commission drew the 87th district to include all or parts of Iroquois, Ford, McLean, Marshall, LaSalle, Livingston, and Woodford counties. In the 1992 Republican primary, Conkling finished third of three candidates losing to Dan Rutherford.

Conkling died at Heritage Health Senior Care in Dwight, Illinois.
