= Mr. Rooter =

American franchise-based company, founded 1970

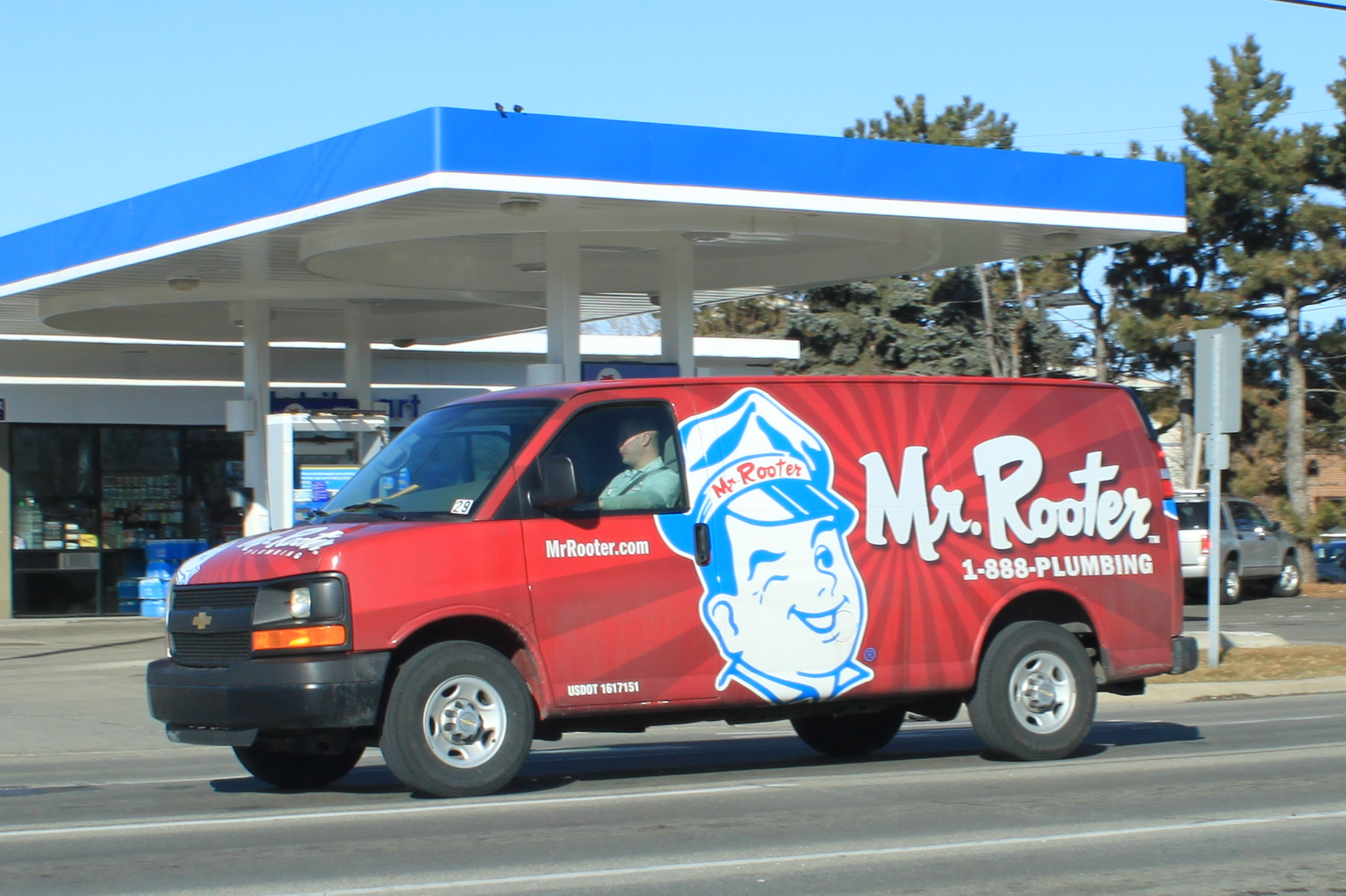
Mr. Rooter service vehicle, Livonia, Michigan (2012)

Mr. Rooter is a plumbing and drain cleaning franchise in the United States and Canada. Franchisees provide plumbing services to residential, commercial, and industrial customers. The president is Matt Kunz.

== History ==
Mr. Rooter was founded in 1970 and began franchising in 1972. In the 1980s, the founder of Rainbow Restoration, Don Dwyer, acquired Mr. Rooter, launching The Dwyer Group, a family of home services franchise brands that grew to include Glass Doctor, Molly Maid, Mr. Appliance, Mr. Electric, Mr. Handyman and others; the overall franchise division of The Dwyer Group, headquartered in Waco, Texas, was officially rebranded as Neighborly in 2018. Mr. Rooter also franchises in Canada and the United Kingdom (as Drain Doctor).
