= Mary Ellen Sheets =

Entrepreneur (born 1940)

Mary Ellen Sheets (born 1940) is an entrepreneur best known for co-founding Two Men and a Truck, the nation's first and largest franchised moving company based in Lansing, Michigan. She is also notable for her role as a woman in business franchising. Sheets' story and business achievements have been referenced in seven published books including Trust is Everything: Become the Leader Others Will Follow by Dr. Aneil Mishra and Dr. Karen Mishra.

== Biography ==
Mary Ellen Sheets
- Born: October 9, 1940 (age 86)
- Organization(s): Two Men and a Truck
- Children: 3

=== Early years ===
Sheets grew up in Okemos, Michigan and attended Michigan State University. She left college at age 20 to start a family and had three children: Melanie Bergeron, Brig Sorber and Jon Sorber.

Sheets was a systems analyst for the state of Michigan when her teenaged sons, Brig Sorber and Jon Sorber, started a small moving business. They used an old pickup truck to earn extra spending money in high school which later grew to be their family business.

=== Two Men and a Truck ===
When Brig and Jon left for college, Sheets took over the business. She purchased a 14-foot truck for $350 and hired two movers in 1985. This is the only money Sheets personally invested in the company. A fellow panelist at a university business seminar in 1988 suggested Sheets consider franchising. The first Two Men and a Truck franchise was awarded in 1989. She became the first woman in forty years to earn the International Franchise Association’s Entrepreneur of the Year Award in 2005.

At the end of her first year in business, Sheets made $1,000 in profit and donated all of it to charity. Ten non-profit organizations received $100. The company continues to support those same organizations today. To continue the spirit of giving started by Sheets, in 2000 Two Men and a Truck named the American Cancer Society its national charity. A portion of each move is donated to the organization. In 2009 the company donated more than $28,000 to the American Cancer Society.

In its second year of operation, Two Men and a Truck earned $180,000 in revenue, and by 1989 the company brought in $560,000 annually. By its thirtieth anniversary in 2015, Two Men and a Truck had 2,100 trucks, 9,000 employees, and had completed 5.5 million moves. What began as a small side business for Sheets expanded, with annual revenues reaching $442 million by 2016 and franchises in more than forty states, Canada, the UK, and Ireland. As of 2025, each of the over 350 locations makes an average of $2,314,000 in revenue yearly.

Sheets' children have played major roles in the company's growth; Melanie Bergeron is the chair of Two Men and a Truck, Brig Sorber is president and CEO and Jon Sorber is executive vice president. Beyond corporate charity, Sheets served on the boards of Lansing Community College, Michigan Freedom Foundation, Michigan Law Abuse Watch, and Edward Sparrow Hospital.

== Awards ==
- 1993: Lansing Chamber of Commerce Small Business Person of the Year
- 1994: Top 25 Michigan Business Woman of the Year
- 1995: Michigan Entrepreneur of the Year Award
- 1998: Blue Chip Award
- 1999: Working Woman 500 Congress Award
- 2002: Athena Award
- 2004: Michigan Women’s Foundation Women of Achievement and Courage Award
- 2005: Entrepreneur of the Year, International Franchise Association
- 2006: Finalist, Ernst & Young International Entrepreneur of the Year Award
- 2008: J.D. Power and Associates
- 2014: Michigan Women's Hall of Fame
