= Home warranty =

Home appliance service maintenance agreement

A home warranty is a contract that agrees to provide a homeowner with discounted repair and replacement services. However, the words "home warranty" are not always used explicitly to mean a legal warranty is being conveyed. In many cases, at least in the United States, a home warranty is not a warranty at all, but rather a home service contract that covers the repair and/or replacement costs of home appliances, major systems such as heating and cooling, and possibly other components of a home, structural or otherwise. Coverage varies significantly across home warranty companies(https://www.forbes.com/advisor/l/best-home-warranty/).

== History ==
Modern home warranty products developed out of earlier builder-backed schemes that provided structural warranties on new homes in the mid-20th century. In the United Kingdom, the National House Building Council (NHBC) began offering new-home warranties in 1936, and similar provincial new home warranty programs were operating in Canada by the 1970s.

In the United States, what are now marketed as home warranties evolved as a type of service contract during the 1970s, alongside extended warranties on automobiles and other consumer goods. Service-warranty companies expanded during that decade as manufacturers shortened standard warranties and third parties began selling separate service agreements, including “home warranty” and home service plans. The federal Magnuson–Moss Warranty Act of 1975, which requires clearer disclosure of written warranties and service contracts, helped shape the legal environment for these products, although most home warranties are regulated primarily under state law.

From the late 1970s onward, several U.S. states created specific statutes for residential service contracts or home warranty companies. Texas, for example, began licensing “residential service companies” that sell home warranty contracts in 1979, while Florida created separate categories for home warranty associations and service-warranty associations in its insurance code.

In 1995 the National Association of Insurance Commissioners (NAIC) adopted the Service Contracts Model Act (Model #685), providing a framework that many states later used or adapted to regulate service-contract and home-warranty providers.

In the 21st century, the home warranty market has grown into a multi-billion-dollar segment of the residential services industry, with some research firms estimating home-warranty service revenues at around US$4 billion in the mid-2020s and projecting continued growth.

Home warranties have also become a common incentive in real-estate transactions in some markets, offered by sellers or real-estate agents as part of closing packages.

== Coverage ==
Most companies cover plumbing, electrical, heating systems, as well as refrigerators, dishwashers, and Microwave ovens. Some charge additional coverage for appliances, such as clothes washers and clothes dryers. Home warranties exist to repair or replace old worn-out systems that have been properly cared for by the homeowner.

=== Limitations ===
Many home warranty companies have limitations within their contracts. Some home warranty companies have an overall limit set, where anything in the contract is covered up to a certain amount of money.

=== Exclusions ===
Generally, home warranties exclude coverage on systems and appliances that have been misused, intentionally damaged, or not maintained.

=== Known conditions ===
Most home warranty contracts will state that repairs and replacements will not be covered if the problem was known prior to the date of coverage. This is sometimes referred to as a known condition. Most often, homeowners run into this problem when purchasing a home. After getting a home inspection, some real estate agents will mistakenly tell the buyer that any problems found in the home inspection will be covered with a home warranty. Instead, if the home inspection notates that something needs to be repaired or replaced before the date of closing, most home warranties will not repair or replace it.

=== State rules and regulations ===
In some states, such as New Jersey for example, builders of new homes are required to provide a home warranty to those purchasing homes. Though the terminology is identical, these home warranty plans differ from the ones offered to existing home owners or through real estate transactions involving the purchase of existing homes. The coverage may be very different from other similarly named agreements.

Home warranty is one of several terms for a contract between homeowners and companies that cover some of the costs associated with specific repairs and replacements of household objects. Related industries often use such terms as residential service contract and appliance warranty plan. Just as is the case with home warranty in states such as Florida, residential service contracts are regulated in some states such as Texas. It is of value for consumers to understand their state's regulations for companies that offer to provide maintenance or repair services and/or coverage for related costs since some companies may be operating without proper licensing. Consumers may sometimes avoid falling prey to unlicensed companies by consulting their state's policies and other information regarding home warranty and similar services. In some cases, current lists of licensed companies are available for consumers to check on the applicable state government agencies' websites.

In NSW (Australia), a homeowners warranty must be taken out by your builder and a certificate of insurance must be provided to you if the value of work is over $20,000.

== Controversy ==
The State of California Department of Insurance issued a cease-and-desist order # VA202100169 and monetary penalty against Complete Care Home Warranty

Some common complaints that home warranty clients have:

- Warranty companies deny the claim citing homeowner's maintenance negligence.
- Warranty companies deny the claim because of a "pre-existing problem".
- Warranty companies always repair the appliance even when it is in such bad shape as to be replaced.

Home warranty companies deny systematic denial and claim that customers need to pay close attention to the contract. Warranty contracts specify that pre-existing conditions and problems arising due to lack of proper care and maintenance are not covered.

It is not too uncommon to find companies that open the business for a short period of time and then vanish. Around 20 companies went out of business between 2013 and 2014. Buyers are encouraged to check the provider reviews and ratings of the companies selling the product.

In some cases, companies operate in jurisdictions without the required licensing or registration.
