= Two Men and a Truck =

American moving company

TWO MEN AND A TRUCK®/International, LLC
- Type: Private
- Founded: 1985
- Headquarters: Lansing, Michigan, United States
- Key people: Greg Weller, CEO ServiceMasterBrands; Randy Shacka, President; Brant Hartle, CFO; Sara Bennett, Chief Talent Officer
- Website: twomenandatruck.com

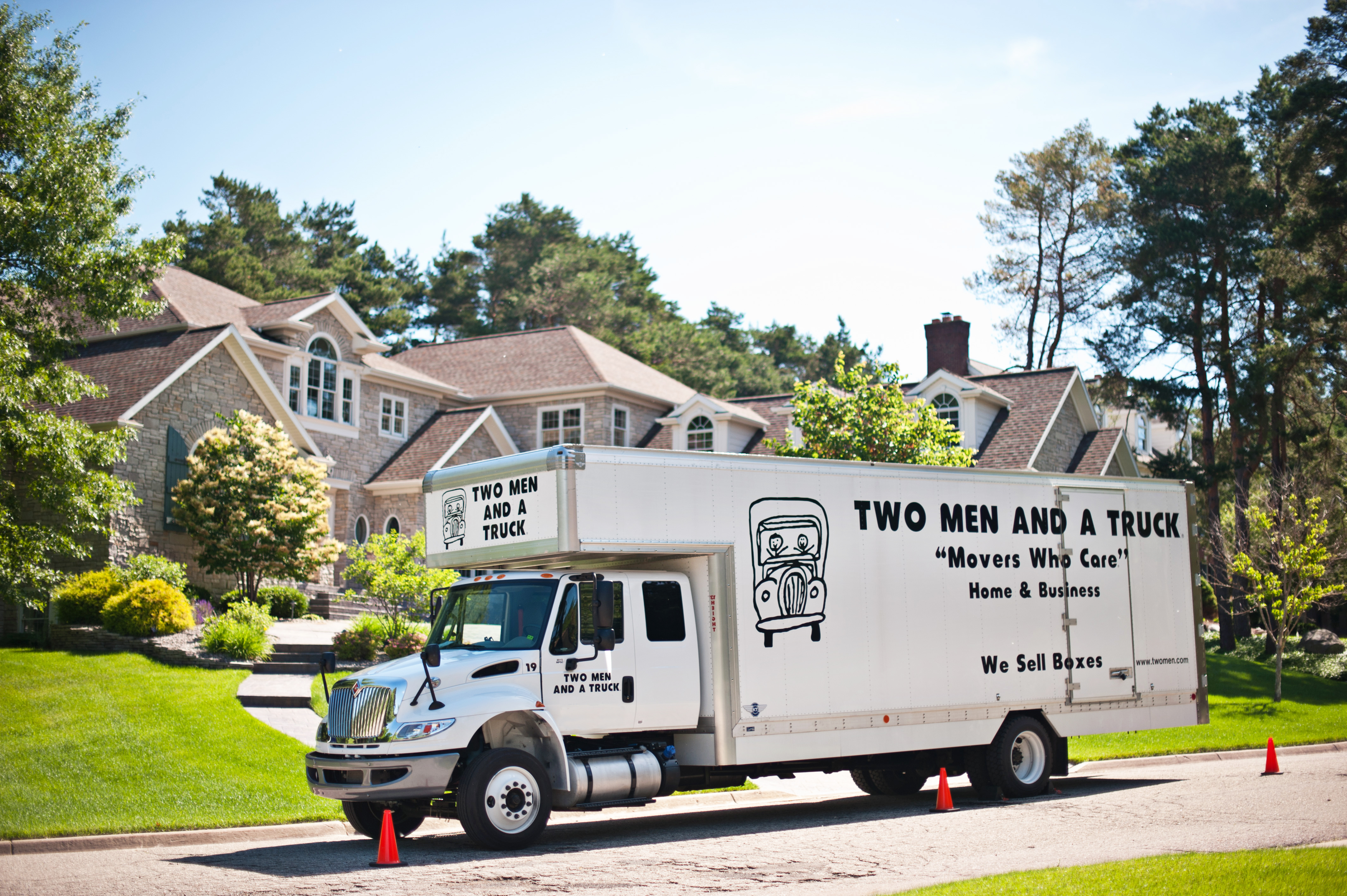
Company truck

Two Men and a Truck is the largest American franchised moving company. Headquartered in Lansing, Michigan, franchises operate in 48 U.S. states, as well as the United Kingdom, Canada, and Ireland. Two Men and a Truck Australia is a separately owned and independent company registered in Australia and is not affiliated with the US franchise network.

== History ==
The company was founded in the early 1980s by two Lansing brothers, Brig and Jon Sorber. Using an old '66 Ford pickup truck, they performed moves to earn extra spending money. Their mother, Mary Ellen Sheets, obtained the sketch that became the logo of the company from a mutual friend, and took over the business when her sons left for college. In 1985, she purchased a 14-foot (4.3 m) truck for $350 and hired a pair of movers. This is the only money Sheets personally invested in the company. A fellow panelist at a university business seminar in 1988 suggested Sheets consider franchising. The first franchise was awarded in 1989.

== Franchising ==
The initial franchise fee is $50,000; there is also an ongoing royalty of 6% of revenue. As of 2021, there are 292 franchises in the United States, 28 in Canada, and 2 in the UK and Ireland.

Initial investment: Mini-market start-up costs typically run between $100k and $192k and standard market start-up costs run between $179k and $585k depending on several variables including authority fees which vary by state, store location and trucks.

Net worth requirements: Mini market minimum requirements are $80,000 in liquid assets and $160,000 in net worth. Standard marketing area capital requirement is $150,000 in liquid assets and $400,000 in net worth.
