= Crime scene cleanup =

Cleanup of infectious materials

Crime scene cleanup is a term applied to cleanup of blood, bodily fluids, and other potentially infectious materials (OPIM). It is also referred to as biohazard remediation, and forensic cleanup, because crime scenes are only a portion of the situations in which biohazard cleaning is needed. Incidents which may require this type of cleanup include accidents, suicide (or attempted suicide), homicides, and decomposition after unattended death, as well as mass trauma, industrial accidents, infectious disease contamination, animal biohazard contamination (e.g. feces or blood) or regulated waste transport, treatment, and disposal.

== Usage ==
Television productions like CSI: Crime Scene Investigation have added to the popularity of the term "crime scene cleanup". Australia, Canada and England have added it to their professional cleaning terminology. As a profession, it is growing in popularity because of media exposure and the growth of training programs worldwide.

The generic terms for crime scene cleanup include trauma cleaning, crime and trauma scene decontamination ("CTS Decon"), biohazard remediation, biohazard removal, and blood cleanup. The state of California refers to individuals who practice this profession as Valid Trauma Scene Waste Management Practitioners.

== Types of cleanups ==
Crime scene cleanup includes blood spills following an assault, homicide or suicide, tear gas residue, and vandalism removal/cleanup. There are many different sub-segments, named primarily after additional collateral, contingency, or preconditions, regarding the presence of non-blood borne organics, toxic irritants (e.g., tear gas) or disease vectors. However, it is the legality of charging a fee for mitigating potentially harmful biohazard situations that differentiates a registered crime or trauma practitioner from any general restoration, carpet cleaning, janitorial or housekeeping service.

Human blood can carry deadly diseases like HIV/AIDS, Hepatitis B, and Hepatitis C. Every spill of blood must be handled under the presumption that it is infected.

== Business ==
Crime scene cleanup began primarily as a local or regional small business activity but maturity and consolidation has created some larger entities in the industry; only a few nationwide companies exist, although some national carpet cleaning and restoration company franchises have added crime scene cleanup and biohazard removal to their services.

== Regulatory requirements ==
While the field of crime scene cleanup is not specifically regulated as a class, most, if not all, of the activities performed by biohazard cleanup teams in the United States are regulated or fall under best practice guidelines from governing and advisory bodies such as OSHA, NIOSH, DOT, and EPA. Those who hire a crime scene cleanup company should ensure they are properly trained in applicable federal and state regulations and can provide documentation of proper biohazardous waste disposal from licensed medical waste transportation and disposal companies. The client should confirm that the company is registered with the state Department of Health in California, Florida, and Georgia. A few states, such as California and Georgia (Georgia's Law), are the only states that explicitly require registration or licensing for crime scene cleanup. Other states may require biohazardous waste transport permits from the DOT.

In the US, OSHA requires limiting exposure to blood-borne pathogens as much as possible due to the assumption that the blood and biological material is infectious. Most actions to limit exposure fall under cross-contamination protocols, which provide that certain actions be taken to avoid further spreading the contamination throughout otherwise clean areas. Before beginning work on any trauma scene, CTS De-con companies should have an exposure control plan. Under employee safety and cross-contamination protocols, OSHA's Hazardous Waste Operations and Emergency Response (HAZWOPER) 29 CFR 1910.120 and Bloodborne pathogens 29 CFR 1910.1030 regulations pertain to bioremediation.

In the UK, biohazards are regulated in part by HSE. Canada has published Canadian Biosafety Standards and Guidelines.

== Methods ==
The crime scene cleaners' work begins when the coroner's office or other officials, or government body "releases the scene" to the owner or other responsible parties. Only when the investigation has completely terminated on the contaminated scene may the cleaning companies begin their task.

Standard operating procedures for the crime scene cleanup field often include methods for decontaminating internal and external environments. Universal precautions recognized worldwide are the cautionary rule-of-thumb for this field of professional cleaning. For example, the personnel involved in the cleanup are expected to wear shoe covers, liquid impermeable coveralls, and protective eyewear. Wearing protective gloves and the use of specifically rated cleaning agents are also mandatory policies to ensure that the infectious agents such as hepatitis and HIV are killed. There are organizations that stress the avoidance of cleaning areas that officers cannot properly see to avoid accidental wounds such as needle punctures.

Cleaning methods for removing and sanitizing biohazards vary from practitioner to practitioner. Some organizations are working to create a "Standard of Clean," such as ISSA's K12 Standard, which includes the use of quantifiable testing methods such as ATP testing.

== Organizations ==
The American Bio Recovery Association (ABRA) is the 3rd party credentialing body and membership organization for companies that specialize in this niche industry. Bio Recovery covers a bit more than the clean up of body fluids. Bio Recovery is the act of assessing risk, mitigating threats and remediating conditions resulting from the release of biological hazards. This may include crime and trauma mitigation (bloodborne and body fluids), suicide cleanup, outbreak response, zoonotic diseases, foodborne diseases, public health threats, illicit drugs and clandestine drug labs. ABRAs certification credentialing platform requires applicants to obtain prerequisite requirements prior to sitting for an independent exam. Questions on the exams are derived from the information in the required prerequisite and demonstrate retention of industry knowledge providing a high level of credibility. Member Companies of ABRA are held to the highest international standards for ethics and professionalism.

Three levels of Credentialing are available for industry career advancement from the American Bio Recovery Association include the Certified Bio Recovery Technician (CBRT), Certified Bio Recovery Supervisor (CBRS), and the Certified Bio Recovery Master (CBRM).

The Institute for Inspection Cleaning and Certification (IICRC) is the Standards development organization for the cleaning industry. It created the ANSI/IICRC S540 Standard for Trauma and Crime Scene Cleanup. The second revision is now released. The ANSI/IICRC S540 Standard defines criteria and methodology used by the technician for inspecting and investigating blood and other potentially infectious material (OPIM) contamination and establishing work plans and procedures. The Standard describes the procedures to be followed by professionals and the precautions to be taken when performing trauma and crime scene cleanup regardless of surface, item, or location. This standard assumes that all scenes have been released by law enforcement or regulatory agencies. The standard does not address "how" to cleanup crime scenes. It clearly states, “The S540 does not intend to attempt to teach remediation procedures, but rather provides the principles and foundation for understanding proper remediation practices. The S540 is not a substitute for remediation training and certification programs that are necessary to obtain competence in the field.”

International Sanitary Supply Association (ISSA) is a global standards body and trade organization of professional janitorial and cleaning professionals.

== In popular culture and the media ==
Crime scene cleanup as a profession has been featured sporadically in popular culture and the media. It first showed up in films when Jorg Buttgereit made Nekromantik and Quentin Tarantino produced Curdled, and later in films such as the Samuel L. Jackson film Cleaner, and the Amy Adams and Emily Blunt film Sunshine Cleaning. On television, it has been featured in a smattering of documentaries aired on the National Geographic Channel and the Discovery Channel, as well as reality series such as Grim Sweepers. The Korean drama series Move to Heaven follows a pair of cleaners who also examine the lives of the deceased they are hired to clean up after by collecting their personal belongings.

In print and online, the task has been the subject of Alan Emmins' book Mop Men: Inside the World of Crime Scene Cleaners, and in a piece on "six figure jobs" that appeared on CNN. Another book is Aftermath, Inc.: Cleaning Up after CSI Goes Home. An extensive article on all aspects of crime scene cleanup was published in the forensic science section of Discovery's How Stuff Works.

In crime scene cleanup video games, the main objective in the game is the process of the cleanup. An example is Viscera Cleanup Detail. Viscera Cleanup Detail is a PC game distributed through Steam that enables players to clean up blood and body remains after a Sci-Fi battle has occurred on a space station. Another example of crime scene cleanup in video games is Safeguard. Safeguard takes a more realistic and educational approach, enabling users to learn about the hazards of crime scene cleanup, as well as the equipment and tools used. Safeguard also uses virtual reality to immerse users in the crime scene environment.

Some fictional depictions show crime scene clean-up involving criminal organizations. Crime fiction sometimes refers to the term "cleaner" as an expert in destroying and removing evidence, usually working for criminals. For example, if a murder has been committed, a cleaner is contracted to remove all traces of the crime as if it never happened.
