= American Residential Services =

American home services company

American Residential Services, LLC
- Industry: Plumbing, HVAC
- Founder: C. Clifford Wright (co-founder)
- Headquarters: Memphis, Tennessee
- Area served: 24 states and Washington, DC
- Key people: Scott Boose, CEO
- Revenue: 600 million (2010–2011)
- Number of employees: 6,500
- Website: www.ars.com

American Residential Services (ARS) is a United States network of home and commercial plumbing, heating and air conditioning (HVAC) businesses, operating under the trade name ARS/Rescue Rooter. The trade name came from the acquisition and merging of ARS and Rescue Rooter by their then-parent company ServiceMaster. They have locations in 24 states. The company is based in Memphis, Tennessee. The ARS mascot is Dandy with his hat to align to that of our service heroes.

== History ==
ARS was established in 1975. The name "Rescue Rooter" was trademarked in 1976 by the California-based Rescue Industries Inc. It was a family-owned West Coast plumbing and drain cleaning company. In 1996, ARS was founded to consolidate local and regional HVAC service companies. Shortly after, The ServiceMaster Company, based in Downers Grove, Illinois, acquired both Rescue Rooter and ARS, in 1998 and 1999 respectively, and brought them together under the "ARS/Service Express" brand. The company eventually dropped the Service Express brand and the parent brand was known primarily as “ARS/Rescue Rooter".

In October 2006, ARS/Rescue Rooter was then acquired from ServiceMaster by two private equity firms, Caxton-Iseman Capital and Royal Palm Capital Partners, for $100 million. In May 2014, ARS was acquired by Charlesbank Capital Partners from Caxton-Iseman Capital and Royal Palm Capital Partners.

== Services and Operations ==
=== Core service lines ===
ARS, operating under the trade name ARS/Rescue Rooter, provides residential home services and selected light commercial services in the home-services sector.

Its primary service lines include heating, ventilation, and air conditioning (HVAC), including repair, maintenance, installation, and replacement of air-conditioning systems, furnaces, heat pumps, ductless systems, and related accessories. The company also offers indoor air quality services, including UV air purifiers, whole-home humidifiers and dehumidifiers, and duct-cleaning systems.

ARS also provides plumbing, drain, and sewer services, including plumbing repairs and installations, water heater and tankless water heater services, gas line work, drain and sewer line cleaning, trenchless replacements, sump pump service, and related drainage solutions.

In some markets, the company also offers additional services such as attic insulation, radiant barrier installation, ventilation, and certain electrical services.

=== Geographic Coverage and Scale ===
ARS is headquartered in Memphis, Tennessee. and has built an extensive network across the United States.

As of 2022, the company stated that it operated approximately 70 locally managed service centers across 24 U.S. states and employed approximately 6,000 people.

The company's locations listing shows operations in California, Colorado, Florida, Georgia, Illinois, Indiana, Kansas, Kentucky, Maryland, Massachusetts, Michigan, Nebraska, Nevada, New Jersey, North Carolina, Ohio, Oregon, Pennsylvania, South Carolina, Tennessee, Texas, Utah, Virginia, and Washington.

According to GI Partners, ARS completes more than 1.2 million customer visits annually and is supported by a workforce of more than 6,000 employees, including approximately 2,500 skilled professionals.

=== Market focus and business model ===
ARS focuses primarily on residential customers, as well as selected light commercial markets, with an emphasis on emergency repair, preventative maintenance, and system replacement.

The company operates through a locally managed service-center structure in which branches operate under the ARS/Rescue Rooter brand or affiliated regional brands while using centralized corporate support functions such as marketing, logistics, and hiring.

=== Distinguishing features ===
ARS promotes an Exceptional Service Guarantee, which the company describes as emphasizing customer satisfaction, reliable scheduling, and prompt response for HVAC and plumbing emergencies.

The company has also expanded through acquisitions of regional service providers, including The Rooter Works and My Electric Works in 2021.

ARS has broadened its operations from a focus on HVAC and plumbing to a wider home-services platform under the ARS/Rescue Rooter name.

== Recognition and Notable Initiatives ==
Since its founding, American Residential Services (ARS) has undertaken community outreach efforts and received industry recognition in the home services sector.

=== Community initiatives ===
In 2016, ARS launched the ARS Cares program, a community outreach initiative through which the company donated HVAC systems and water heaters to selected recipients, including veterans, first responders, and community volunteers.

In May 2017, ARS expanded the program through its Cares for Veterans initiative, which provided donated systems to veterans in several markets, including San Diego, Tampa, Dallas, and Salt Lake City. Company employees also participated in volunteer activities such as garden planting and meal preparation for homeless veterans.

According to company statements, ARS Cares has completed hundreds of home-service makeovers and donated millions of dollars in equipment and services. In 2022, the company stated that the program had contributed more than US$1.3 million in equipment and services.

=== Awards and recognition ===
Several ARS/Rescue Rooter branches received the Angi Super Service Award for 2023, an award recognizing service providers with consistently high customer ratings and reviews.

ARS has also listed recognitions in its media materials including the Angie’s List Super Service Award, the HomeAdvisor Best HomeAdvisor Award, the Media Business Journal Best Places to Work award, and Google Nest Pro HVAC Installer Partner of the Year 2020.

In 2016, ten ARS branch companies were reported to have received the Angie’s List Super Service Award for service performance in multiple markets.
