= Maid service =

Commercial provider of domestic work

Maid service, cleaning service, apartment cleaning and janitorial service are terms more modernly describing a specialized outside service, providing a specific service to individuals, businesses, fraternal clubs and associations as well residential premises.

== History ==
Maid services may be different from what is generally thought to be the historically prevalent services performed by a maid, and these services may be provided by both male and/or female individuals.

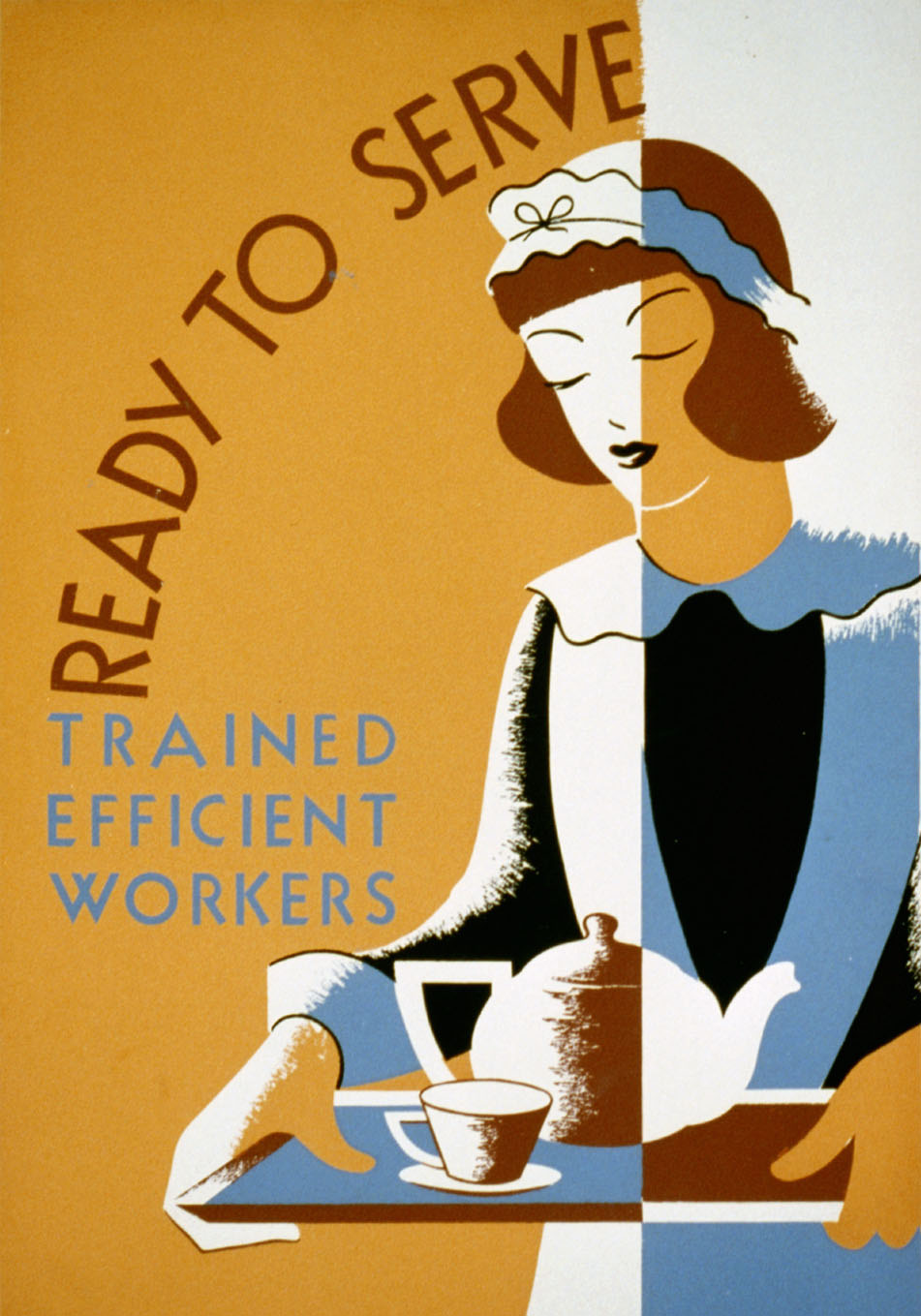
Stylized drawing of a maid on a Works Progress Administration poster

Once part of an elaborate hierarchy in affluent homes and profitable businesses, today a maid may be the only domestic worker that middle and even upper-income households can afford, as a household domestic-help employee. Maids perform typical domestic chores such as cooking, ironing, washing, cleaning, grocery shopping, walking the family dog, and tending to the household children.

== Socioeconomic factors ==
In the Western world, comparatively few households can afford live-in domestic help employees. In lieu of live-in staff, a maid service is utilized as a periodic cleaner. In developing nations, differences found within income and social status between different socio-economic classes, lesser educated women, with less opportunity are believed to provide a labor source for domestic work.

Socioeconomic opportunities, not being confined to any specific global location, may allow cleaning services to perform 'cleaning' as their source of business as a service.

There are thousands of residential cleaning businesses throughout the United States, United Kingdom, Canada, China, South Korea, and Indonesia. Historically and traditionally, cleaning was considered a woman's role, but as more and more women have joined the workforce, the time pressure on families with children has grown. Consequently, paying a service for cleaning makes sense to persons who can afford it. Additionally, many modern homeowners lack the proper knowledge to use the safest and most effective cleaning products.

== Services provided ==
Maids, per se, perform typical domestic chores such as cooking, ironing, washing, cleaning, folding clothes, grocery shopping, walking the family dog and taking care of children. Some maid services offer hourly, daily, weekly, bi-weekly, and monthly work as well.

In real estate, investors and landlords can begin the basic cleaning of the interior of a property once tenants have vacated and all debris is removed. For those properties seized by the banks due to foreclosure, this is done in the real-estate owned (REO) stage and is called a maid refresh.

== Reasons for use ==
Utilizing a maid service may be considered due to a number of personal factors, including but not limited to geographical location, social standing, lack of personal time, lack of experience. There are many reasons why individuals may consider hiring help around the house, especially with cleaning. It may, for example, prove easier for them to enjoy time with their family rather than spending time cleaning.

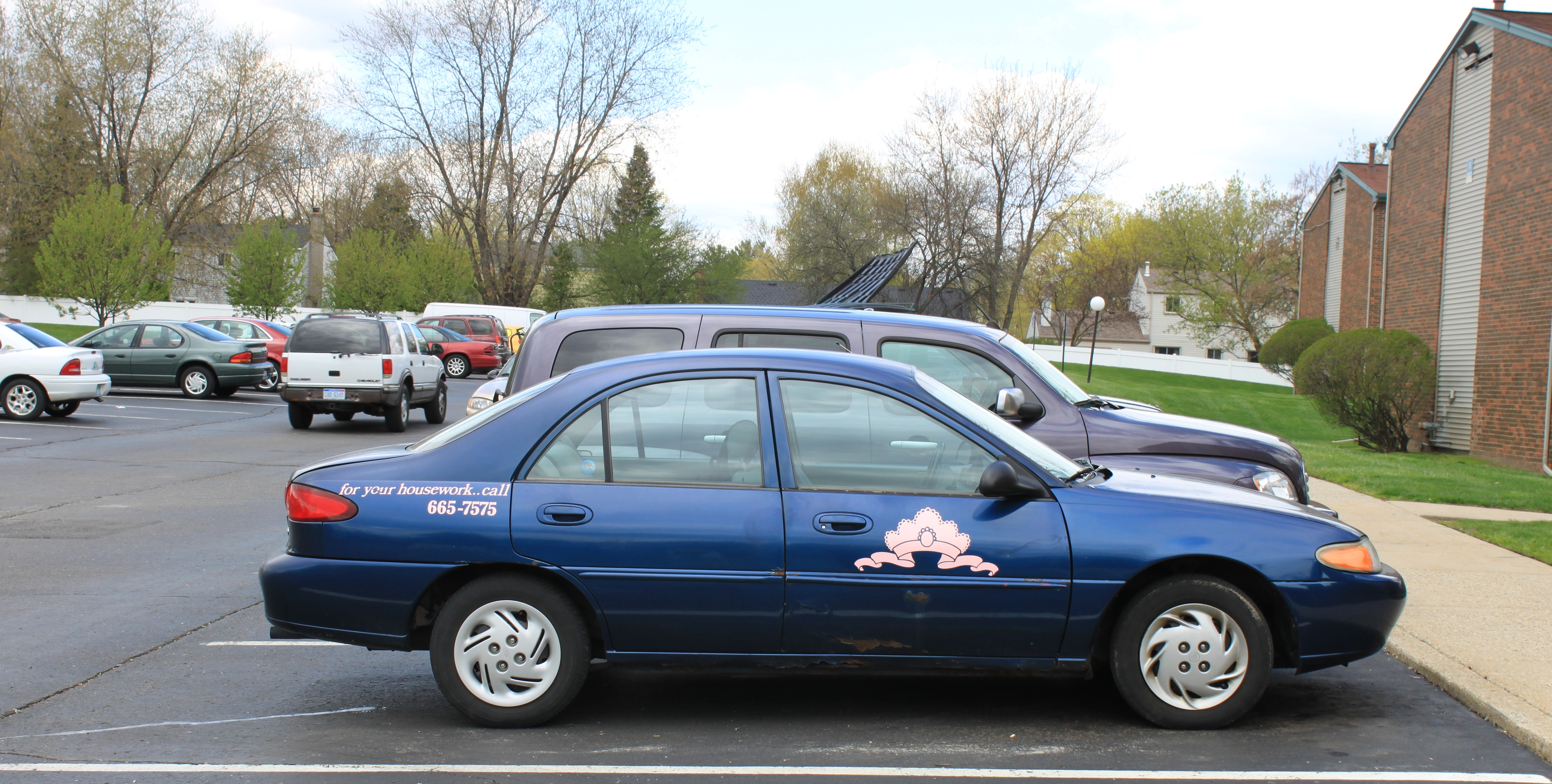
A maid service "maid car" used to transport maids to assignments, Ypsilanti Township, Michigan

A maid service may be more expensive than simply hiring a part-time maid, but it offers a number of advantages. Usually the service will provide not only someone to do the cleaning, but also all of the necessary cleaning supplies. Also, as a bona fide employer, the service is responsible for withholding Social Security and other income taxes. Third, a service is insured and often bonded, so it can be held accountable if something is stolen or missing.

== See also ==
- Au pair
- Domestic worker
- Footman
- Foreign domestic helpers in Hong Kong
- Housekeeper (domestic worker)
- Nanny
