= Merry Maids =

Cleaning services franchise

- The Merry Maids logo

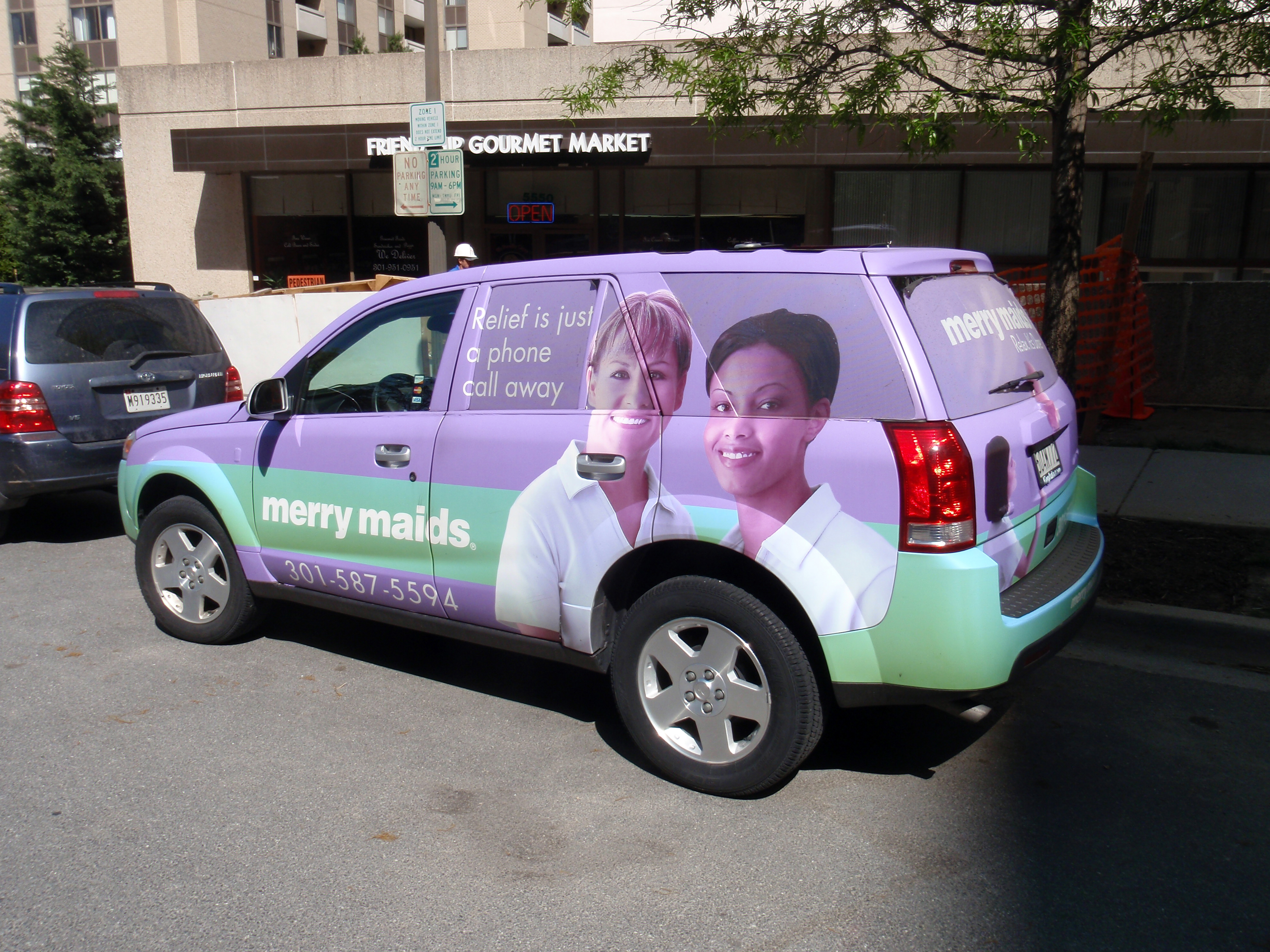
- A Merry Maids service vehicle
- Type: Subsidiary
- Industry: Service
- Founded: 1979; 47 years ago
- Headquarters: Memphis, Tennessee
- Number of employees: 8,000+ (in 2007)
- Parent: ServiceMaster
- Website: merrymaids.com

Merry Maids is an international franchisor which sells and supports residential cleaning services franchises throughout the United States and Canada, and the United Kingdom. Merry Maids was founded in 1979, and was acquired by ServiceMaster in 1988. In 2007, the company had 1,400 independently owned and operated franchises worldwide and over 8,000 employees.

== History ==
=== Timeline ===
- 1979 – Merry Maids was founded in Omaha, Nebraska, by Dallen Peterson and his family.
- 1988 – ServiceMaster Brands purchases Merry Maids.

== Labor relations ==
Several Merry Maids franchisees in the United States have been sued by their employees and by United States federal agencies for labor law violations. In 2015, the United States Court of Appeals for the First Circuit upheld an unfair labor practice order issued by the National Labor Relations Board (NLRB) against a Merry Maids franchisee, Merry Maids of Boston, in a dispute over the right of a labor union to hold a union representation election among its employees. The First Circuit ruled that the NLRB had jurisdiction in the case, and rejected the franchisee's claim that the behavior of certain employees made a fair election impossible.

== Safety record ==
In 2015, Northampton's Merry Maids franchise was awarded a Governor’s Award for Safety Excellence by the U.S. state of Pennsylvania, with a record of no work-related injuries for over 1,580 days and no work-related fatalities in 23 years of operation.

== See also ==
- List of cleaning companies
