= American Home Shield =

American home warranty company

American Home Shield Corporation
- Type: Subsidiary of Frontdoor Inc.
- Industry: Home warranty
- Founded: 1971; 55 years ago Memphis, Tennessee, U.S.
- Headquarters: Memphis, Tennessee, U.S.
- Area served: Nationwide
- Key people: Bill Cobb, CEO
- Services: Home warranty
- Number of employees: 2,000
- Parent: Frontdoor Inc.
- Website: www.ahs.com

American Home Shield Corporation is an American home warranty company based in Memphis, Tennessee. It administers home warranty contracts on major home systems and appliances.

== Overview ==
American Home Shield was founded in 1971 and operated independently until it was acquired by ServiceMaster in 1989. In 2018, the American Home Shield business was spun off under Frontdoor, Inc., a new, publicly traded company on the NASDAQ (ticker symbol FTDR). American Home Shield serves over 2 million customers across 49 states and the District of Columbia. It is one of the largest home warranty providers in the United States. The company works with over 16,000 independent contractor firms and 60,000 technicians in the U.S. The headquarters are in Memphis, Tennessee.

== History ==
In 2019, Frontdoor, Inc. acquired Streem, Inc., which uses enhanced augmented reality, computer vision, and machine learning to help home services professionals diagnose home breakdowns virtually and assess if any parts are needed prior to the initial in-home visit. American Home Shield now uses Streem technology as part of their service process in available markets. Frontdoor launched American Home Shield ProConnect in 2020 to offer on-demand home maintenance services. American Home Shield ProConnect is available in 37 markets.

== Headquarters ==
Previous logo

The company’s corporate headquarters is located in the heart of downtown Memphis, Tennessee. In March 2020, American Home Shield transitioned all employees to a virtual work environment due to the COVID-19 pandemic in the United States. In mid-2021, the company announced that it would be virtual-first company. They outsource all of their customer service to other countries.

== Lawsuits and Complaints ==
American Home Shield (AHS) has faced legal and regulatory scrutiny as well as a substantial volume of consumer complaints. In 2010, the State of Texas settled with AHS for approximately $5 million over allegations that the company engaged in "false, misleading or deceptive acts and practices," including routine denial of high-cost service claims; AHS made no admission of wrongdoing Inman. In addition, AHS reached a settlement in the Abney v. American Home Shield class-action case concerning broker compensation under the Real Estate Settlement Procedures Act (RESPA), where a federal court approved new broker compensation practices that purportedly complied with RESPA guidelines and released real estate professionals from any past liability investors.frontdoorhome.com.

On the consumer front, the Better Business Bureau (BBB) has received a significant number of complaints regarding AHS. The BBB reports tens of thousands of complaints over recent years—one source cites over 28,700 complaints overall, with common issues being unfulfilled repair commitments, poor communication, and dissatisfaction with subcontracted service quality Trusted Company Reviews. Other consumer reviews and watchdog sources note customer frustration with delays in claim approval, difficulty replacing covered items, and service fees without resolution

== Products ==
In 2021, American Home Shield launched three new home warranty plan products.

Product names include (ranging from least to most expensive):

- ShieldSilver - covers the major parts of 14 home systems.
- ShieldGold - covers the major parts of 14 home systems plus 9 kitchen and laundry appliances.
- ShieldPlatinum - covers the major parts of 14 home systems, 9 kitchen and laundry appliances, and premium features such as roof leak repair coverage, unlimited HVAC refrigerant, one pre-season HVAC tune-up per year, and coverage for Modifications, Code Requirements, and Permits.

In 2022, American Home Shield launched three new home warranty plan products for people buying or selling a home as part of the real estate transaction.
