= Commercial cleaning =

Cleaning service provided for commercial buildings and establishments

Commercial cleaning companies are contracted to carry out cleaning jobs in a variety of premises. Commercial cleaners, often referred to as custodians or janitors, work in many different types of buildings such as schools, banks, and offices. The main job duties include picking up trash, cleaning, and disinfecting.

== Cleaning techniques and equipment ==
A video on research on the health effects of exposure to cleaning chemicals

Commercial office cleaning companies use a wide variety of cleaning methods, chemicals, and equipment to facilitate and expedite the cleaning process. The scope of work may include all internal, general and routine cleaning - including floors, tiles, partition walls, internal walls, suspended ceilings, lighting, furniture and cleaning, window cleaning, deep cleans of sanitary conveniences and washing facilities, kitchens and dining areas, consumables and feminine hygiene facilities as well as cleaning of telephones, IT, and other periodic cleaning as required. Essentially, everything involved with a commercial business, be it cleaning a property for a real estate agent, or cleaning the aftermath of a building project. Carpet cleaning though, even with regular vacuuming, needs hot water extraction applied every 18 to 24 months. External cleaning, litter picking, and removal of graffiti may also be incorporated.

The two global cleaning industry associations, the British Institute of Cleaning Science (BICSc) and the International Sanitary Supply Association (ISSA), both publish standards for managers and operatives engaged in cleaning activities.

=== Consumables ===
Contracts often require the cleaning companies to provide consumables such as paper towels, toilet rolls, liquid soap, bin liners, etc.

== Workers ==
The commercial cleaning industry is extremely competitive and employees tend to be at the lower end of the pay scale. The salary for working in the commercial cleaning industry rage from approximately $31,000 to $48,000, depending on the job title. However, unionized workers may earn higher wages. Many commercial cleaning companies provide on-the-job training for all new employees due to the nonexistence of tertiary based courses for the cleaning industry. A trend in the cleaning industry is the elimination of the usage of more hazardous chemicals such as drain cleaners due to liability and environmental concerns. Individuals employed in commercial cleaning typically hold the job title of janitor, custodian, or day porter. A study was conducted on hazardous chemicals and the effect they have on employees in the commercial cleaning field. Results from this study showed that the chemicals being used by these employees had respiratory, dermatological and many other negative issues associated with them.

In Australia, the United States, and Europe, commercial cleaning companies are encouraged to screen all employees for evidence of a criminal background. In some countries, such as the United Kingdom, cleaners working in schools, children's care homes and childcare premises are required by law to undergo a criminal record check

== See also ==
- List of cleaning companies
