= ServiceMaster =

American cleaning services company

ServiceMaster Brands
- Type: Private
- Industry: Service Franchising
- Founded: September 7, 1929 in Chicago, Illinois, U.S.
- Founder: Marion E. Wade
- Headquarters: Atlanta, Georgia, U.S.
- Number of locations: 2,000+
- Key people: Greg Weller (CEO); Anand Naimpally (CFO)
- Revenue: $2.59 billion (2015)
- Owner: Roark Capital Group
- Number of employees: 13,000 (2015)
- Website: servicemaster.com

ServiceMaster Brands is an American privately held company owned by Roark Capital Group that provides residential and commercial services. Its headquarters are located in Atlanta, Georgia, after moving there in 2020 from Memphis, Tennessee.

Brands operated by ServiceMaster include ServiceMaster Clean, ServiceMaster Restore, Merry Maids, Two Men and a Truck, Indoor Science and Aftermath Services. The core services of the company are disaster response and restoration, janitorial services, professional home cleaning and Bio Hazard Cleaning.

ServiceMaster has more than 7,000 company-owned and franchise locations around the world. It has 13,000 corporate employees and a franchise network that independently employs over 33,000 additional people.

== History ==
ServiceMaster was founded in 1929 by Marion E. Wade, a minor league baseball player, as a moth-proofing company in Chicago, Illinois. It was incorporated in 1947 and expanded to franchised carpet cleaning in 1952. Its movement into business services makes it a large outsourcing company.

In the 1980s, the company acquired several branch and franchise-based service companies, including Terminix, TruGreen (1991), Merry Maids (1988), and American Home Shield (1989).

A group of equity sponsors led by Clayton, Dubilier & Rice (CD&R) acquired ServiceMaster in July 2007 and took the company private.

In 2011, Hank Mullany, former executive vice president of Walmart U.S. and president of northern U.S. Walmart, was appointed as CEO for all ServiceMaster brands. Robert J. Gillette was appointed chief executive officer in June 2013.

As of January 1, 2014, TruGreen is no longer a brand of ServiceMaster, having instead become a separate privately held company.

ServiceMaster Global Holdings, Inc., then the parent of ServiceMaster Brands, announced on June 25, 2014, that it had priced an initial public offering of 35,900,000 shares of common stock at $17.00 per share. The shares began trading on the New York Stock Exchange on June 25, 2014, under the ticker symbol SERV. The company continues to be majority-owned by private equity firms Clayton, Dubilier & Rice, StepStone Group and Ridgemont Equity Partners, and JPMorgan Chase Funding.

Nikhil Varty was appointed chief executive officer in July 2017. Varty stepped down in 2020.

On July 26, 2017, ServiceMaster Global Holdings, Inc. announced a plan to spin off its American Home Shield business from its Terminix and Franchise Services Group into a separate publicly traded company.

In 2020, Naren Gursahaney was appointed as chief executive officer, later that year, Roark Capital Group purchased ServiceMaster Brands.

In August 2021, ServiceMaster Brands purchased Two Men and a Truck, a family-owned moving franchise. As part of the sale, ServiceMaster Brands agreed to make charitable contributions to the nonprofits supported by Two Men and a Truck over the years.

In April 2022, ServiceMaster Brands purchased Aftermath Services, a privately owned trauma & biohazard cleanup company.

== Acquisitions ==
ServiceMaster Clean (established 1952): Janitorial and carpet cleaning

Terminix (founded 1927, acquired 1986, separation 2020): pest control; divested from Terminix Global Holdings October 2020

Merry Maids (acquired 1988): maid services

American Home Shield (acquired 1989); spun off in 2018

Furniture Medic (acquired 1996): furniture repair

Rescue Industries and American Residential Services, now known as ARS/Rescue Rooter: RI acquired in 1998; ARS acquired and merged with RI 1999; sold 2006

ServiceMaster Restore (established 2013): disaster restoration

AmandaSpec (acquired 2007): home inspection

Two Men and a Truck (acquired 2021)

Aftermath Services (established 1996, acquired 2022): trauma & biohazard cleaning

Indoor Science (acquired 2022)

ServiceMaster Brands sold Furniture Medic and AmeriSpec to Eagle Merchant Partners in April 2023.

Amerispec is a franchisor which sells and supports residential and commercial inspection services franchisees throughout the United States and Canada. The company's main services are general home inspection, relocation inspections and commercial property inspections. AmeriSpec has around 300 independently owned and operated franchises in the United States and Canada. In January 2007, after previously being a wholly owned subsidiary of American Home Shield, the company was sold to the ServiceMaster Holding Company and was placed under the leadership of the other ServiceMaster Brands.
