= Terminix =

American pest control company

Terminix International Company, L.P.
- Type: Subsidiary
- Industry: Pest control
- Founded: 1927; 99 years ago in Memphis, Tennessee, United States
- Founder: E.L. Bruce
- Headquarters: Memphis, Tennessee, U.S.
- Area served: Nationwide
- Key people: Rafael Carrasco (CEO)
- Services: Termite & Pest control
- Revenue: $1.798 billion (2019)
- Number of employees: 10,500
- Parent: Rentokil Initial
- Website: www.terminix.com

Terminix International Company, L.P. is the largest pest control company in the world, operating in 47 states in the United States and 70+ countries around the world. It is a subsidiary of UK-based Rentokil Initial.

== History ==
In 1927, E. L. Bruce, owner of the E. L. Bruce Company in Memphis, Tennessee, wanted to find a way to protect the hardwood floors they manufactured from damage by termites and founded the Bruce Terminix Research Laboratory. In 1932, senior chemist Frank Lyons created the first termiticide, an insecticide specifically designed to kill termites. The company began to franchise under the name Bruce Terminix. In 1955, Terminix was the first company to offer a termite protection contract, with annual inspections and a guarantee. In 1957, franchisees began offering residential and commercial pest control services.

In 1968, the E. L. Bruce Company, including Bruce Terminix, was sold to Cook Industries. The company began looking to expand its business both inside and outside of the United States and purchased a pest control company in Mexico. Terminix partnered with Sears, Roebuck and Company to offer pest control services under the Sears Termite and Pest Control name. In 1972, the company changed their name to Terminix International to highlight their expanded operations.

ServiceMaster, a global holding company, purchased Terminix from Cook Industries in 1986. It continued to acquire pest control companies, including former franchisees, to become the largest pest control company in the world by 1990. The company expanded into Europe in 1994 with the acquisition of Peter Cox PLC, a pest-control and wood preservation business in Britain. In 2001, Terminix purchased its former partner, Sears Termite and Pest Control. In 2007, ServiceMaster moved its main offices from Downers Grove, Illinois to the site of Terminix's headquarters in Memphis, Tennessee.

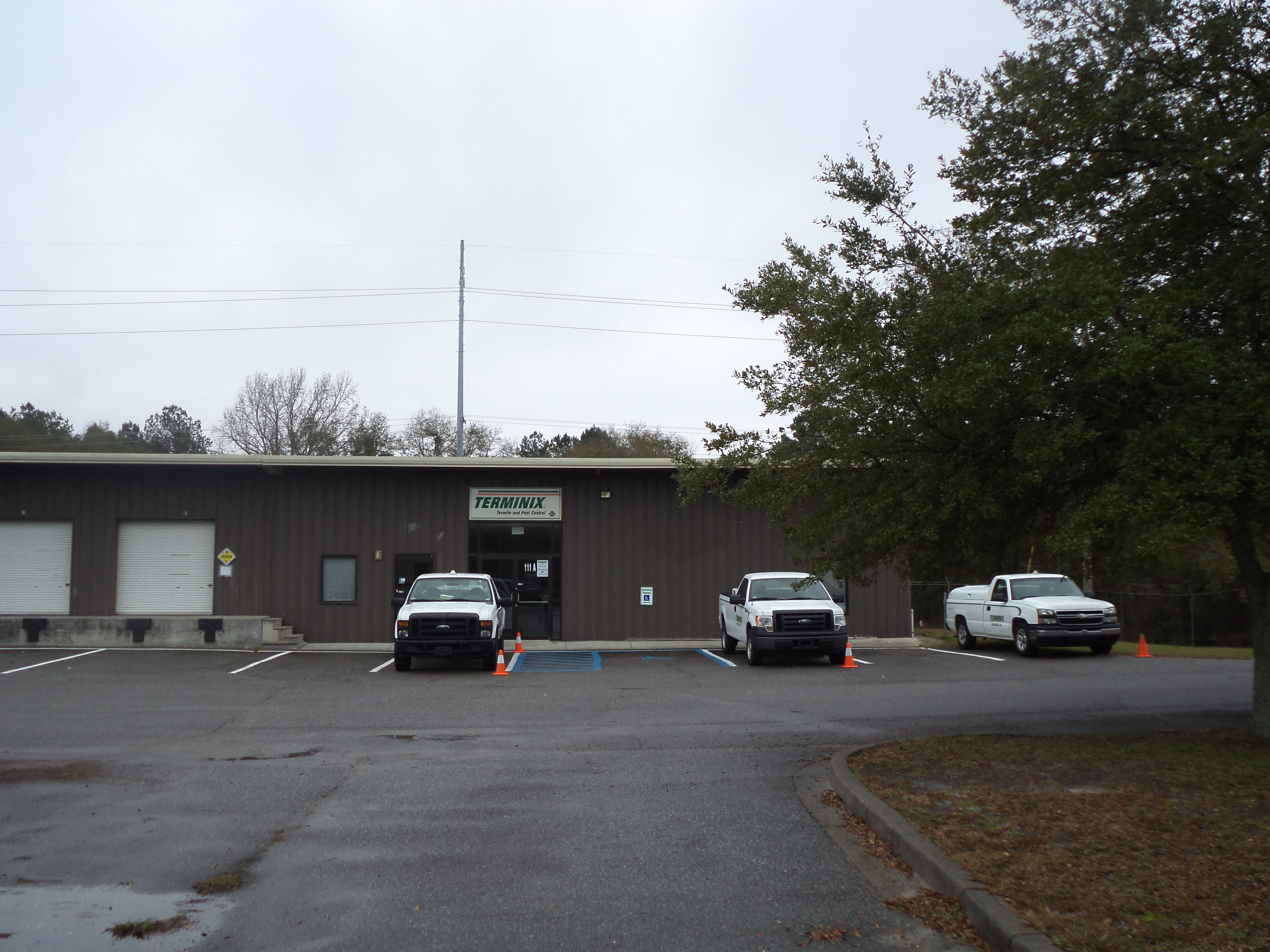
Facility in Valdosta, Georgia

Over the first three months of 2009, Terminix acquired nine pest management companies across seven states. In December 2012, Terminix closed six acquisitions adding over $10 million in revenue. In November 2015, Terminix acquired the Utah-based company, Alterra Pest Control. Terminix started its foray into Canada in 2013 when it acquired Magical Pest Control, based in Toronto, and Vancouver-based Care Pest & Wildlife Control. Terminix's parent company at the time, ServiceMaster, held its IPO in June 2014. In 2015, Terminix Canada announced the acquisition of Excel Pest Control, based in Fredericton, and St. John's-based Cabot Pest Control. A year later, Terminix Canada acquired Halifax-based Ace Pest Control. In October 2020, ServiceMaster Global Holdings, Inc., sold its ServiceMaster Brands segment and associated trademarks to Roark Capital, and subsequently changed its name to Terminix Global Holdings, Inc., and its NYSE ticker symbol to TMX. Then came the acquisition of the pest control division of Canada-based Citron Hygiene in 2021. The most recent Canadian acquisition was Newmarket-based Environmental Pest Control, also in 2021. Service Master is the parent company for Terminix.

In December 2021, UK-based Rentokil Initial announced that it would acquire Terminix for $6.7 billion. The acquisition was closed on October 12, 2022.

== Products ==
Terminix works with residential and commercial customers for pest control services including termite, mosquito and bed bug treatments, as well as insulation options.

Terminix released the environmentally safe mosquito bait Attractive Targeted Sugar Bait in 2014. The garlic oil makes mosquitoes sick and kills 90 percent of the mosquitoes within three weeks. The company also produces AllClear mosquito repellant, which is an all natural mix of essential oils.

== Legal proceedings ==
In May 2008, termite inspectors in California sued ServiceMaster and its Terminix unit for failure to pay overtime, rest breaks, and other work-required expenses. Terminix held that termite inspectors were outside sales employees. In June 2011, the U.S. District Court held that termite inspections are not sales activities. The case was filed as a class action, and class action case was denied, while Individual claims were allowed.

In March 2016, Terminix settled with the United States Department of Justice over illegal use of banned pesticides in the United States Virgin Islands and the poisoning of a family vacationing there. The family of four was poisoned when the unit below their rented villa was fumigated with the highly toxic methyl bromide, which has been banned from indoor use in the United States since 1984.

In 2020, “ An investigation by the Alabama Attorney General’s office and the Alabama Department of Agriculture and Industries revealed that Terminix engaged in a pattern of collecting annual termite protection premiums from Alabama consumers, but failed to deliver or provide the termite protection services promised in the contracts consumers had with Terminix.” The company agreed to a $60 million settlement with the Department of Agriculture, largely directed at consumers.

== In popular culture ==
In 1971, Stan Freberg won Clio Awards for three of his radio commercials for Terminix, entitled "Vintage Floorboards," "Interview," and "Blue Tennis Shoes."

In 1983, the film Mr. Mom featured a reference to Terminix technicians.

In 2010, Tim Heidecker and Eric Wareheim claimed at Comic-Con that they had partnered with Terminix for an upcoming release of their movie "Blues Brothers 2012". In this film, the Blues Brothers would take the roles of Terminix technicians.

In June 2015, Terminix provided Attractive Targeted Sugar Bait around the clubhouse and golf course of TPC Southwind for the FedEx St. Jude Classic tournament. That same month, Terminix released "Mosquitonado," a movie trailer parody during National Mosquito Control Awareness Week. The trailer featured Sharknado star Tara Reid.
