= 2010 Lucas Oil Slick Mist 200 =

1st race of the 2010 ARCA Racing Series

Race details
- Race 1 of 20 of the 2010 ARCA Racing Series
- Date: February 6, 2010
- Official name: 49th Annual Lucas Oil Slick Mist 200
- Location: Daytona International Speedway, Daytona Beach, Florida
- Course: Permanent racing facility
- Course length: 2.5 miles (4.0 km)
- Distance: 80 laps, 200 mi (321.868 km)
- Scheduled distance: 80 laps, 200 mi (321.868 km)
- Weather: Mainly clear skies, with temperatures reaching up to about 70 °F (21 °C), and wind gusts of up to about 35 miles per hour (56 km/h)
- Average speed: 109.706 mph (176.555 km/h)

Pole position
Driver	James Buescher	Phoenix Racing
- Time: 49.575

Most laps led
Driver	Bobby Gerhart	Bobby Gerhart Racing
- Laps: 51

Winner
No. 5	Bobby Gerhart	Bobby Gerhart Racing

Television in the United States
- Network: Speed
- Announcers: Rick Allen, Phil Parsons, and Darrell Waltrip

Radio in the United States
- Radio: MRN

The 2010 Lucas Oil Slick Mist 200 was the 1st stock car race of the 2010 ARCA Racing Series season, and the 49th iteration of the event. The race was held on Saturday, February 6, 2010, in Daytona Beach, Florida at the Daytona International Speedway, a 2.5-mile (4.0 km) permanent tri-oval shaped superspeedway. The race took the scheduled 80 laps to complete. At race's end, Bobby Gerhart, driving for his own team, Bobby Gerhart Racing, would take home the victory, after dominating a majority of the race, leading 51 laps. This was Gerhart's 7th career ARCA Racing Series win, his sixth at Daytona, and his first of the season. To fill out the podium, Mark Thompson and John Wes Townley, both driving for Venturini Motorsports, would finish 2nd and 3rd, respectively.

This race was mostly known as the stock car debut for Danica Patrick, as she was making her transition from IndyCar to NASCAR. With Patrick entered into the race, it became the most viewed ARCA event in series history, with 2.4 million viewers tuning into the Speed Network. Along with Patrick, Nelson Piquet Jr., the former Formula 1 driver, would also make his debut into stock cars.

The race would also make more history, as six total female drivers were entered into the race (Alli Owens, Jennifer Jo Cobb, Jill George, Danica Patrick, Leilani Munter, and Milka Duno), the most in a single ARCA race.

== Background ==
Daytona International Speedway, the track where the race was held.

Daytona International Speedway is a race track in Daytona Beach, Florida, United States. Since opening in 1959, it has been the home of the Daytona 500, the most prestigious race in NASCAR as well as its season opening event. In addition to NASCAR, the track also hosts races of ARCA, AMA Superbike, IMSA, SCCA, and Motocross. The track features multiple layouts including the primary 2.500 mi (4.023 km) high-speed tri-oval, a 3.560 mi (5.729 km) sports car course, a 2.950 mi (4.748 km) motorcycle course, and a 1,320 ft (402.3 m) karting and motorcycle flat-track. The track's 180-acre (72.8 ha) infield includes the 29-acre (11.7 ha) Lake Lloyd, which has hosted powerboat racing. The speedway is operated by NASCAR pursuant to a lease with the City of Daytona Beach on the property that runs until 2054. Dale Earnhardt is Daytona International Speedway's all-time winningest driver, with a total of 34 career victories (12- Daytona 500 Qualifying Races) (7- NASCAR Xfinity Series Races) (6- Busch Clash Races) (6- IROC Races) (2- Pepsi 400 July Races) (1- The 1998 Daytona 500).

The track was built in 1959 by NASCAR founder William "Bill" France Sr. to host racing that was held at the former Daytona Beach Road Course. His banked design permitted higher speeds and gave fans a better view of the cars. Lights were installed around the track in 1998, and today it is the third-largest single-lit outdoor sports facility. The speedway has been renovated four times, with the infield renovated in 2004 and the track repaved in 1978 and 2010. The track is 50 miles north of Orlando.

=== Entry list ===
- (R) denotes rookie driver

#	Driver	Team	Make	Sponsor
0	Butch Jarvis	Wayne Peterson Racing	Dodge	Steris Corporation
1	Nick Igdalsky (R)	Andy Belmont Racing	Ford	ModSpace
4	Ricky Carmichael	Turner Motorsports	Toyota	Monster Energy
5	Bobby Gerhart	Bobby Gerhart Racing	Chevrolet	Lucas Oil Slick Mist
06	Barry Fitzgerald	Wayne Peterson Racing	Ford	TheBusPlace.com
6	Nelson Piquet Jr.	Eddie Sharp Racing	Toyota	Eddie Sharp Racing
7	Danica Patrick	JR Motorsports	Chevrolet	GoDaddy
09	Grant Enfinger	RAB Racing	Ford	BeasleyAllen.com, Roush Yates Performance
10	Mike Holt	Fast Track Racing	Chevrolet	Casite
11	Bryan Silas	Fast Track Racing	Ford	Rockingham Speedway, American Custom Yachts
12	Russ Dugger	DGM Racing	Chevrolet	Accell Construction
14	Chase Mattioli (R)	Andy Belmont Racing	Ford	Big Machine Records
15	Alli Owens	Venturini Motorsports	Toyota	ElectrifyingCareers.com
16	Joey Coulter	Coulter Motorsports	Chevrolet	Rip It Energy Fuel
17	Hal Martin	Mark Gibson Racing	Dodge	Mark Gibson Racing
21	Jennifer Jo Cobb	Bowsher-Mooi Motorsports	Chevrolet	Bowsher-Mooi Motorsports
22	Dakoda Armstrong (R)	Cunningham Motorsports	Dodge	Cunningham Motorsports
23	Frank Wilson Jr.	Hixson Motorsports	Chevrolet	Drug Testing Centers of America, Lifeguard M
25	Mikey Kile	Venturini Motorsports	Toyota	TAG Heuer Eyewear
26	Brad Smith	Brad Smith Motorsports	Ford	ApplianceZone.com
28	Chris Cockrum	ACG Motorsports	Chevrolet	AccuTech, Mohawk Cable
29	Jesse Smith	Jones Racing Group	Dodge	Hormel Foods, Child's Tire
30	Terry Jones	Jones Racing Group	Dodge	Jones Racing Group
31	Tim George Jr.	Richard Childress Racing	Chevrolet	RCR Development
32	Justin Marks	Win-Tron Racing	Toyota	Construct Corps
34	Darrell Basham	Darrell Basham Racing	Chevrolet	Anti-Monkey Butt Powder
35	John Wes Townley	Venturini Motorsports	Toyota	Zaxby's
36	Robb Brent	Allgaier Motorsports	Dodge	Orchard Chrysler-Dodge-Jeep
38	Greg Sarff	Capital City Motorsports	Dodge	Great Dane Trailers
42	Scott Stenzel	Spraker Racing Enterprises	Ford	Yellow Stripes Making The Driver
43	Kyle Martel	Bill Martel Racing	Chevrolet	Hanover Cold Storage, Finish Line Express
44	Frank Kimmel	Kimmel Racing	Ford	Ansell, Menards
48	Jill George	James Hylton Motorsports	Dodge	Radon.com
51	James Buescher	Phoenix Racing	Toyota	Phoenix Construction
52	Bill Baird	Ken Schrader Racing	Chevrolet	Saturn Machine
55	Steve Arpin	Venturini Motorsports	Toyota	Venturini Motorsports
58	Chad Hackenbracht	CGH Motorsports	Chevrolet	Tastee Chocolate Apples
59	Leilani Munter	Mark Gibson Racing	Dodge	GREENandSAVE
60	Patrick Sheltra	Sheltra Motorsports	Dodge	PowerTrac Machinery
66	Mark Thompson	Venturini Motorsports	Toyota	Phoenix Air
68	Steve Blackburn	Blackburn Motorsports	Dodge	Harley-Davidson & Honda of Prestonburg
75	Chuck Walker	Bob Schacht Motorsports	Chevrolet	Bob Schacht Motorsports
76	Jerick Johnson	Team Johnson Motorsports	Dodge	American Legion, David Law Firm
77	Tom Hessert III	Cunningham Motorsports	Dodge	Cunningham Motorsports
80	Brad Lloyd	Hover Motorsports	Ford	Stadelhofer Construction, Matt Cardeiro Ent.
81	Craig Goess	Eddie Sharp Racing	Toyota	Greenville Toyota of North Carolina
83	Sean Corr	Empire Racing	Ford	Empire Racing
85	Lance Fenton	Team Gill Racing	Dodge	Team Gill Racing
90	Milka Duno	Stringer Motorsports	Toyota	Stringer Motorsports
95	Tommy Joe Martins	Martins Motorsports	Ford	Martins Motorsports
97	Matt Lofton	Matt Lofton Motorsports	Chevrolet	Strutmasters.com
99	Josh Richards	Ken Schrader Racing	Chevrolet	Presta

== December testing ==
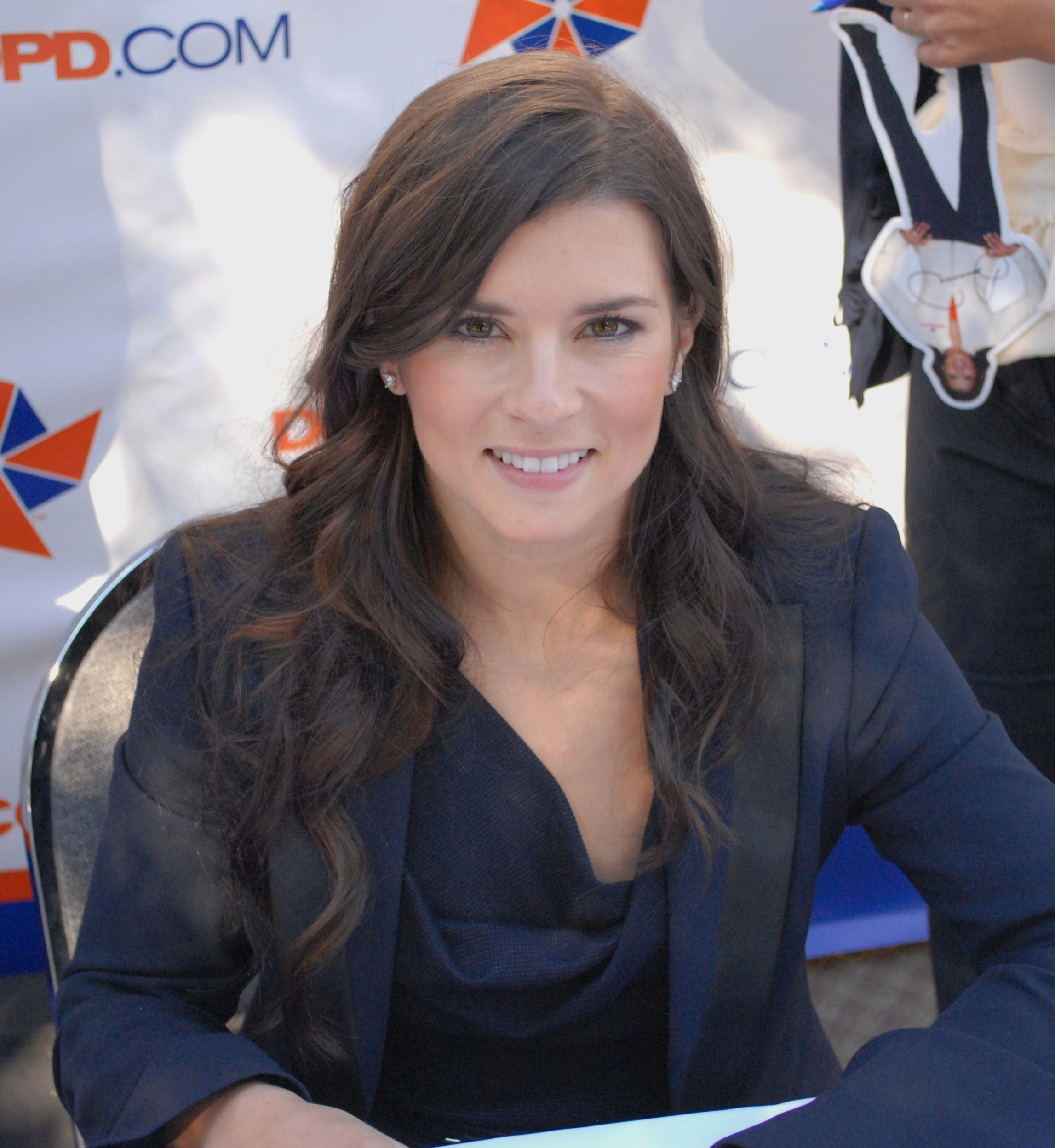
Danica Patrick made her stock car debut after driving an ARCA car during 2009 testing.

Nearly two months before the race, ARCA would have a three-day testing session, which lasted from Friday, December 18, 2009, through Sunday, December 20. The sessions would mainly last for a few hours. The first session was held on Friday, but would only last for 35 minutes, due to inclement weather. Despite only running four laps at full speed, Danica Patrick would drive a stock car for the first time in her career. She would rank 12th overall in the session. Another notable driver that made laps during the session was Narain Karthikeyan, who was the first Indian driver to compete in Formula 1. Karthikeyan placed 17th overall. At the end of the session, Mikey Kile, driving for Venturini Motorsports, set the fastest time, with a lap of 49.804, and an average speed of 180.708 mph (290.821 km/h). Kile was followed by his teammates, Steve Arpin and Alli Owens, who were 2nd and 3rd quickest. 20-year-old Brandon McReynolds, the son of veteran NASCAR crew chief, Larry McReynolds, recorded the 4th position. Joey Coulter, driving for his family team, rounded out the top five. The rest of the top ten consisted of Bryan Silas, Nick Igdalsky, Lance Fenton, Grant Enfinger, and Matt Lofton.

The second session would be held on Saturday, and would go the full distance, with 61 drivers competing in it. By virtue of just starting the session, Milka Duno became the first Hispanic woman to test an ARCA Racing Series car. Patrick Sheltra, driving for his family team, recorded the fastest time, with a lap of 49.502, and an average speed of 181.811 mph (292.596 km/h).

He was followed by the Venturini teammates, Mikey Kile, Steve Arpin, and Alli Owens, who ranked 2nd, 3rd, and 4th, respectively. Steve Blackburn rounded out the top five. The rest of the top ten included James Buescher, Matt Lofton, Bobby Gerhart, Joey Coulter, and Terry Jones.

The third and final session would be held on Sunday, also going the full distance, with 53 drivers that ran laps. Robb Brent, driving for Allgaier Motorsports, recorded the fastest time, with a lap of 49.250, and an average speed of 182.741 mph (294.093 km/h). Once again, Mikey Kile would post the second quickest time, with Bryan Silas recording third place. Alli Owens and Patrick Sheltra would round out the top five. The rest of the top ten included Steve Arpin, Terry Jones, Joey Coulter, Jason Bowles, and Danica Patrick.

== Practice and qualifying ==
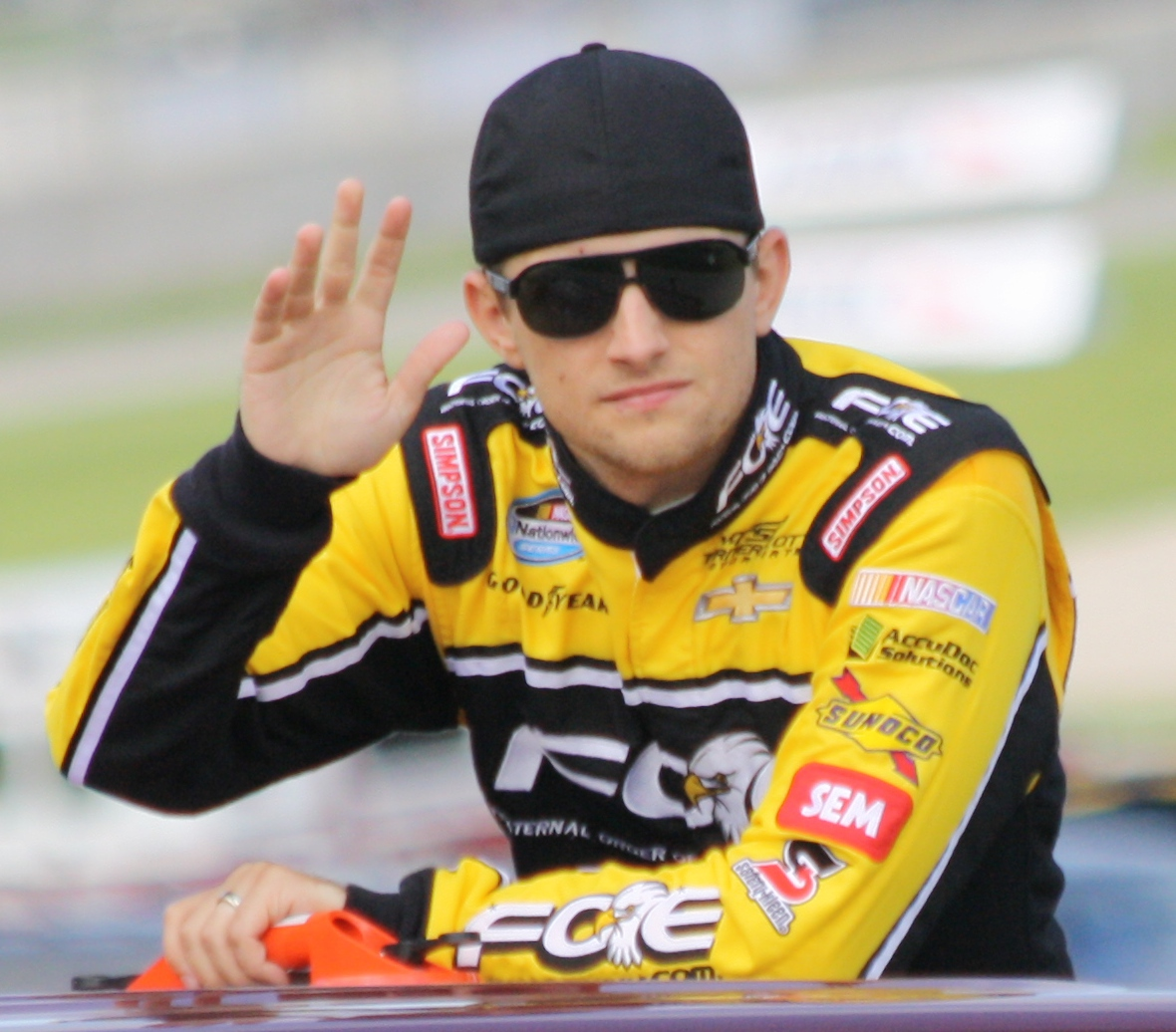
James Buescher had the fastest time during practice. He would ultimately win the pole for the race as well.

The official practice session was held on February 4, 2010, and would last for nearly five hours. James Buescher, last year's race winner, scored the fastest time throughout the session, recording a lap of 49.355, and an average speed of 182.352 mph (293.467 km/h). Mikey Kile and Mark Thompson, teammates at Venturini Motorsports, recorded the 2nd and 3rd fastest times. Frank Kimmel, the nine-time ARCA Racing Series champion, scored the 8th quickest time. The five-time ARCA winner at Daytona, Bobby Gerhart, was 18th fastest overall.

Patrick Sheltra, the Florida native, earned the sixth fastest time.

"Our PowerTrac Dodge is really good," stated Sheltra. "We didn't have to play with it a whole lot today. The car handles well all by itself and the little drafting we did today, I didn't have one complaint. We're going to qualify somewhere between eighth and 12th, I think tomorrow but come race day, we're going to have a shot at winning this thing. I just have to thank Jon and all of the guys for working real hard. I'm really looking forward to the rest of the weekend."

Danica Patrick, who brought most of the media attention during the session, posted the 17th fastest time overall.

"I think today's practice was a success," stated Patrick. "I felt that the #7 GoDaddy.com car got stronger and more comfortable the more runs I made. We have been working hard to get to this point, so hopefully tomorrow's qualifying run goes well."

Along with Patrick, five female drivers also made laps during practice, including Alli Owens, who was 13th quickest, Leilani Munter, who was 32nd, Milka Duno, who was 44th, Jennifer Jo Cobb, who was 47th, and Jill George, who was 50th.

Qualifying would be held on February 5. Earning a time of 49.575, and an average speed of 181.543 mph (292.165 km/h), James Buescher, driving for Phoenix Racing, would take the pole position.

"I knew the car was going to be fast because we were fast yesterday. I wasn't sure how the wind changing around was going to affect everyone else. You could definitely feel the wind blowing. We don't want to mess the car up so we're not going to participate in happy hour. I've actually never done the happy hour practice in any speedway race. They tend to wreck a couple of cars in that practice and I don't want to risk it." stated Buescher. He also describes how it was like to race alongside Danica Patrick.

"She's just another driver in the field and that's how you have to look at it. Hopefully everyone in our race stays smart and no one over drives while trying to impress the large audience we have for this race. They showed us a crash video during the driver's meeting yesterday and it got our attention. I think there were 3 or 4 wrecks ahead of me in this race last year that I was able to avoid so hopefully my heart won't skip too many beats this year."

Mikey Kile, who was fastest out of 60 drivers that competed in the December testing sessions, earned the 2nd place starting position. "I've probably run over 1000 laps in my mind in between the December test and this race weekend," stated Kile. "We were hoping for a pole award today but with our qualifying draw and the wind and everything this is the way it worked out. We worked really hard during the off season and this qualifying result is a direct result of that hard work. The car drafts well and drives well so I'm looking forward to getting the race started. We might go out there and make some single car runs later, but we don't want to draft. We watched the Cup practice yesterday and we don't want to risk messing up our best piece. It's just not worth it."

Joey Coulter, driving for his family team, posted the 3rd place starting spot. "I think we all thought we were going to be a little bit quicker but we are thrilled with the way we ran," stated Coulter. "It was consistent with our practice session yesterday and anytime you can keep consistent that's good. I'm definitely looking forward to tomorrow because I think my car will probably race better than it qualified—at least that's the goal. We'll probably just run a few laps in drafting practice later today."

Dakoda Armstrong and Bryan Silas would round out the top five. The rest of the top ten would include Mark Thompson, Nelson Piquet Jr., Bobby Gerhart, John Wes Townley, and Steve Arpin. Patrick Sheltra and Danica Patrick would both get the same lap time of 50.059. Sheltra would take the 11th spot based on 2009 owners points.

The following drivers would fail to qualify for the race: Lance Fenton, Matt Lofton, Greg Sarff, Scott Stenzel, Brad Lloyd, Chuck Walker, Jerick Johnson, Kyle Martel, and Mike Holt.

A second practice session was scheduled to be held after qualifying, but after periods of non-stop rain, it would be cancelled.

=== Starting lineup ===
Pos.	#	Name	Team	Make
1	51	James Buescher	Phoenix Racing	Toyota
2	25	Mikey Kile	Venturini Motorsports	Toyota
3	16	Joey Coulter	Coulter Motorsports	Chevrolet
4	22	Dakoda Armstrong (R)	Cunningham Motorsports	Dodge
5	11	Bryan Silas	Fast Track Racing	Ford
6	66	Mark Thompson	Venturini Motorsports	Toyota
7	6	Nelson Piquet Jr.	Eddie Sharp Racing	Toyota
8	5	Bobby Gerhart	Bobby Gerhart Racing	Chevrolet
9	35	John Wes Townley	Venturini Motorsports	Toyota
10	55	Steve Arpin	Venturini Motorsports	Toyota
11	60	Patrick Sheltra	Sheltra Motorsports	Dodge
12	7	Danica Patrick	JR Motorsports	Chevrolet
13	44	Frank Kimmel	Kimmel Racing	Ford
14	4	Ricky Carmichael	Turner Motorsports	Toyota
15	32	Justin Marks	Win-Tron Racing	Toyota
16	1	Nick Igdalsky (R)	Andy Belmont Racing	Ford
17	52	Bill Baird	Ken Schrader Racing	Chevrolet
18	29	Jesse Smith	Jones Racing Group	Dodge
19	15	Alli Owens	Venturini Motorsports	Chevrolet
20	09	Grant Enfinger	RAB Racing	Ford
21	30	Terry Jones	Jones Racing Group	Dodge
22	68	Steve Blackburn	Blackburn Motorsports	Dodge
23	77	Tom Hessert III	Cunningham Motorsports	Dodge
24	0	Butch Jarvis	Wayne Peterson Racing	Dodge
25	59	Leilani Munter	Mark Gibson Racing	Dodge
26	83	Sean Corr	Empire Racing	Ford
27	28	Chris Cockrum	ACG Motorsports	Chevrolet
28	95	Tommy Joe Martins	Martins Motorsports	Ford
29	12	Russ Dugger	DGM Racing	Chevrolet
30	14	Chase Mattioli (R)	Andy Belmont Racing	Ford
31	58	Chad Hackenbracht	CGH Motorsports	Chevrolet
32	36	Robb Brent	Allgaier Motorsports	Dodge
33	81	Craig Goess	Eddie Sharp Racing	Toyota
34	31	Tim George Jr.	Richard Childress Racing	Chevrolet
35	23	Frank Wilson Jr.	Hixson Motorsports	Chevrolet
36	34	Darrell Basham	Darrell Basham Racing	Chevrolet
37	26	Brad Smith	Brad Smith Motorsports	Ford
38	48	Jill George	James Hylton Motorsports	Dodge
39	06	Barry Fitzgerald	Wayne Peterson Racing	Ford
40	17	Hal Martin	Mark Gibson Racing	Dodge
41	90	Milka Duno	Stringer Motorsports	Toyota
42	21	Jennifer Jo Cobb	Bowsher-Mooi Motorsports	Chevrolet
43	99	Josh Richards	Ken Schrader Racing	Chevrolet
Failed to qualify
44	85	Lance Fenton	Team Gill Racing	Dodge
45	97	Matt Lofton	Matt Lofton Motorsports	Chevrolet
46	38	Greg Sarff	Capital City Motorsports	Dodge
47	42	Scott Stenzel	Spraker Racing Enterprises	Ford
48	80	Brad Lloyd	Hover Motorsports	Ford
49	75	Chuck Walker	Bob Schacht Motorsports	Chevrolet
50	76	Jerick Johnson	Team Johnson Motorsports	Dodge
51	43	Kyle Martel	Bill Martel Racing	Chevrolet
52	10	Mike Holt	Fast Track Racing	Chevrolet

== Race ==
=== Race summary ===
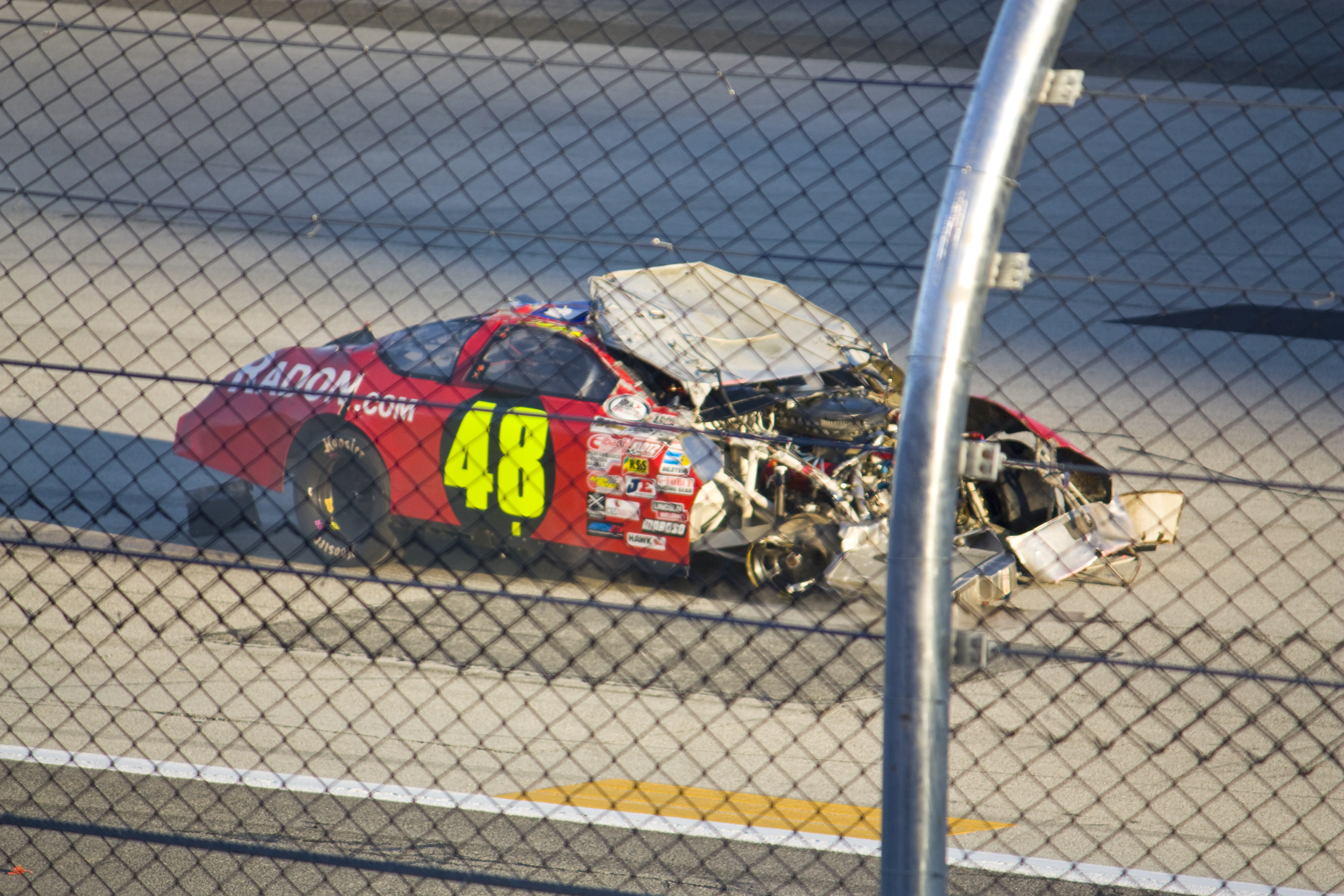
Jill George's damaged car after wrecking on lap 27.

The race officially began on February 6, at 4:30 pm EST. Buescher and Kile would lead the field to the green flag. The first caution came on lap seven, for a multiple car incident, also known as "The Big One". Bill Baird would get loose coming into turn two, eventually causing him to hit the outside wall head-on. Steve Blackburn, with nowhere to go, would slam into the side of Baird's car. As they came back down on the track, more cars continued to pile in. Smoke had built up from the wreck, causing confusion for drivers and spotters. Because of this, more drivers would be involved in it. A total of nine drivers would be involved in the incident.

The race would resume on lap 17, but shortly after, the caution would fly again. Dakoda Armstrong would blow a tire coming into turn one, causing him to spin through the grass. As he came back on to the track, he would get t-boned by Craig Goess. Both drivers would be out of the race.

The race resumed on lap 25. Once again, the caution would come out two laps later. Jesse Smith would blow a tire and hit the outside wall coming out of turn three. Jill George, who was trying to avoid the wreck, would get sideways in turn four, causing her to flip into the outside wall. Her car suffered significant damage. George was able to climb out the car under her own power.

The race would be red flagged for nearly 30 minutes to clean up the damage. After staying out on pit road, Bobby Gerhart would take the lead away from James Buescher, who led every lap during all of the cautions. The field would restart on lap 32. They would run about 10 laps before the fourth caution of the day came out, which had two separate incidents. The first one involved Nick Igdalsky, after he got loose and spun in turn two. The second one involved two drivers, Frank Kimmel and Mikey Kile. Kimmel would get spun from behind by Nelson Piquet Jr., and Mikey Kile would get spun from behind by Bryan Silas.

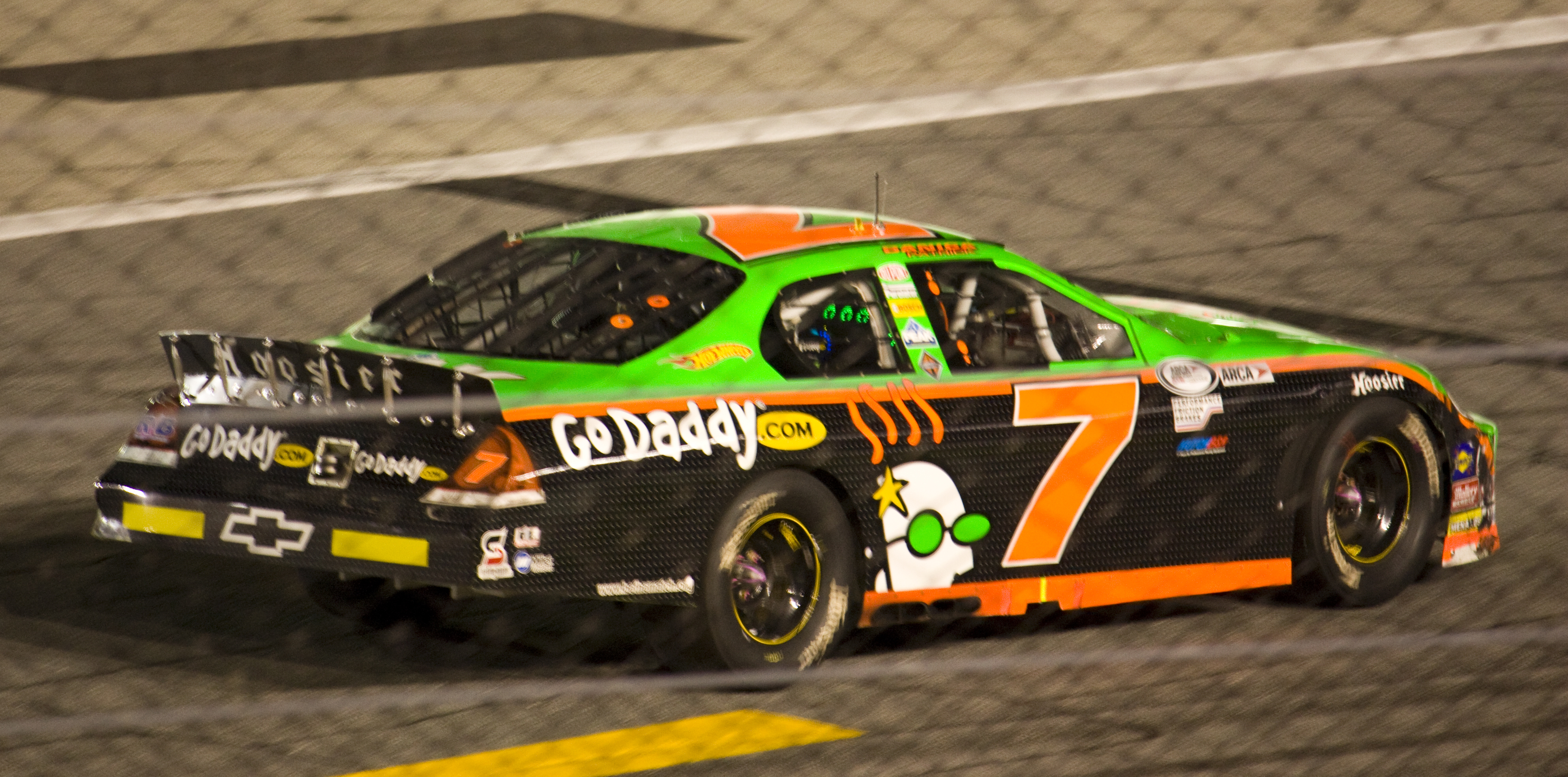
Danica Patrick on pit road during the race.

The race resumed just a little past the halfway point, on lap 46. Danica Patrick, the driver who was on the spotlight throughout the race, brought out the fifth caution. After Sean Corr and Piquet Jr. made contact in turn four, Patrick went to the inside lane and made it three wide. Piquet would then force Patrick off of the track and through the grass, eventually coming back across the track and spinning. Surprisingly, she would be able to save the car and avoid hitting the wall.

"I came down and went straight to the grass, and I thought, "Grass is not good for grip,"" Patrick said after the race. "I came back on the track sideways, and I took my hands off the wheel, and Tony Jr. was screaming at me to get back into it, so I hit the gas, then it caught."

The caution would come back out with 22 laps to go, for a violent crash involving Barry Fitzgerald. Coming out of turn two, Nelson Piquet Jr., the driver who was responsible for the last two cautions, would spin Fitzgerald from behind, causing him to spin towards the inside of the racetrack. Fitzgerald would flip multiple times, eventually coming to a rest on all four tires. Fitzgerald would climb out of the car under his own power.

The field restarted with 17 laps to go. With 14 to go, Steve Arpin would make side contact with Joey Coulter, causing him to get loose. They were trying to get around Nelson Piquet Jr., who was a lap down. As Arpin tried to correct himself, he would once again make contact with Coulter. Arpin moved Coulter down the racetrack, making major contact with Piquet. Piquet was able to go down pit road, as Coulter would drive through the grass and attempt to get back on the track. Ultimately, the caution did not come out.

With three laps to go, another incident would occur. Nick Igdalsky and Terry Jones would make contact in turn one, with Jones eventually blowing a tire coming into turn three. Shortly after that, Alli Owens and Darrell Basham would spin in turn four. However, the caution did not come out, as both drivers were below the racing surface when they spun.

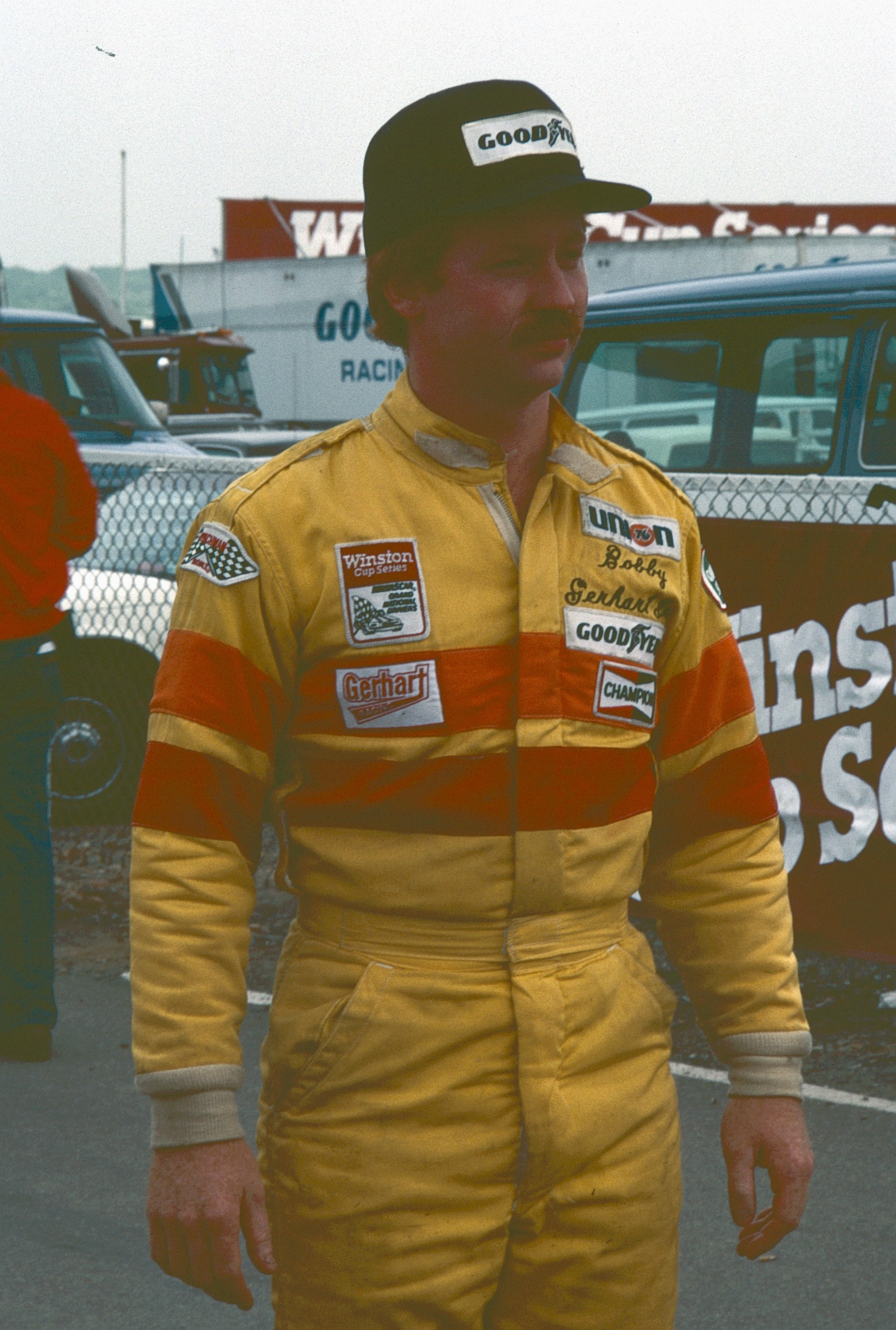
Bobby Gerhart would lead the most laps, and earned his record sixth ARCA win at Daytona.

Bobby Gerhart would be able to hold off the field, and took home the checkered flag. It was his sixth victory at Daytona, making him have the most wins at Daytona in the ARCA Racing Series.

"We've had this plan in place for months," stated Gerhart. "We stuck to our plan, followed through and it worked. We knew we wanted to pit early. We were thinking lap 12 if there was a caution. But the caution came on lap 13 and they opened the pits on lap 14; that's when we came."

Mark Thompson, driving for Venturini Motorsports, would finish in the 2nd spot. His teammate, John Wes Townley, finished 3rd. The pole winner, James Buescher, came in 4th, with Patrick Sheltra rounding out the top five. Danica Patrick, making her stock car debut, would finish an impressive 6th, in a photo finish with Ricky Carmichael. "I was just kind of hanging out there for most of the race," stated Patrick. "There were lots of yellows. It feels to me like I got bumped a little bit in turns one and two. I just held to the yellow line because I know that you're not supposed to go below the yellow line to advance your position and I took myself out unfortunately. I was pretty excited to go from last to the top five. I felt pretty good, I was going side-by-side with people. And then at the end I was running eighth and I thought what the heck so I pulled out of the line and ran high. You can see I was racing by all of the marks on the car. The GoDaddy.com Chevrolet doesn't look very pretty." Tommy Joe Martins, Bryan Silas, and Steve Arpin would round out the top ten, respectively.

=== ARCA's rise to popularity ===
During race, ARCA would break numerous records. Because of Danica Patrick's stock car debut, a total of over 118,000 fans were in attendance, making it the most attended ARCA race in history. ARCA's website received 715,721 pageviews, which broke their previous record with 211,776. 2.4 million viewers tuned into the Speed Network for the race, which was the most viewed ARCA race in history. Because of this, ARCA received a lot more media attention and popularity from the fans.

=== Race results ===
Fin.	St	#	Driver	Team	Make	Laps	Led	Status
1	8	5	Bobby Gerhart	Bobby Gerhart Racing	Chevrolet	80	51	Running
2	6	66	Mark Thompson	Venturini Motorsports	Toyota	80	0	Running
3	9	35	John Wes Townley	Venturini Motorsports	Toyota	80	0	Running
4	1	51	James Buescher	Phoenix Racing	Toyota	80	29	Running
5	11	60	Patrick Sheltra	Sheltra Motorsports	Dodge	80	0	Running
6	12	7	Danica Patrick	JR Motorsports	Chevrolet	80	0	Running
7	14	4	Ricky Carmichael	Turner Motorsports	Toyota	80	0	Running
8	28	95	Tommy Joe Martins	Martins Motorsports	Ford	80	0	Running
9	5	11	Bryan Silas	Fast Track Racing	Ford	80	0	Running
10	10	55	Steve Arpin	Venturini Motorsports	Toyota	80	0	Running
11	15	32	Justin Marks	Win-Tron Racing	Toyota	80	0	Running
12	27	28	Chris Cockrum	ACG Motorsports	Chevrolet	80	0	Running
13	32	36	Robb Brent	Allgaier Motorsports	Dodge	80	0	Running
14	26	83	Sean Corr	Empire Racing	Ford	80	0	Running
15	23	77	Tom Hessert III	Cunningham Motorsports	Dodge	80	0	Running
16	2	25	Mikey Kile	Venturini Motorsports	Toyota	80	0	Running
17	42	21	Jennifer Jo Cobb	Bowsher-Hooi Motorsports	Chevrolet	80	0	Running
18	35	23	Frank Wilson Jr.	Hixson Motorsports	Chevrolet	80	0	Running
19	34	31	Tim George Jr.	Richard Childress Racing	Chevrolet	80	0	Running
20	16	1	Nick Igdalsky (R)	Andy Belmont Racing	Ford	79	0	Running
21	21	30	Terry Jones	Jones Racing Group	Dodge	79	0	Running
22	36	34	Darrell Basham	Darrell Basham Racing	Chevrolet	79	0	Running
23	19	15	Alli Owens	Venturini Motorsports	Chevrolet	78	0	Running
24	37	26	Brad Smith	Brad Smith Motorsports	Ford	78	0	Running
25	13	44	Frank Kimmel	Kimmel Racing	Toyota	78	0	Running
26	3	16	Joey Coulter	Coulter Motorsports	Chevrolet	78	0	Running
27	7	6	Nelson Piquet Jr.	Eddie Sharp Racing	Toyota	67	0	Running
28	30	14	Chase Mattioli (R)	Andy Belmont Racing	Ford	67	0	Running
29	39	06	Barry Fitzgerald	Wayne Peterson Racing	Ford	56	0	Accident
30	20	09	Grant Enfinger	RAB Racing	Ford	38	0	Drive Line
31	38	48	Jill George	James Hylton Motorsports	Dodge	25	0	Accident
32	18	29	Jesse Smith	Jones Racing Group	Dodge	24	0	Accident
33	4	22	Dakoda Armstrong (R)	Cunningham Motorsports	Dodge	16	0	Accident
34	33	81	Craig Goess	Eddie Sharp Racing	Toyota	16	0	Accident
35	40	17	Hal Martin	Mark Gibson Racing	Dodge	7	0	Accident
36	17	52	Bill Baird	Ken Schrader Racing	Chevrolet	6	0	Accident
37	22	68	Steve Blackburn	Blackburn Motorsports	Dodge	6	0	Accident
38	29	12	Russ Dugger	DGM Racing	Chevrolet	6	0	Accident
39	25	59	Leilani Munter	Mark Gibson Racing	Dodge	6	0	Accident
40	31	58	Chad Hackenbrancht	CGH Motorsports	Chevrolet	6	0	Accident
41	24	0	Butch Jarvis	Wayne Peterson Racing	Dodge	6	0	Accident
42	43	99	Josh Richards	Ken Schrader Racing	Chevrolet	6	0	Accident
43	41	90	Milka Duno	Stringer Motorsports	Toyota	6	0	Accident
Official race results

== Standings after the race ==
Drivers' Championship standings

Pos	Driver	Points
1	Bobby Gerhart	235
2	James Buescher	230 (−5)
3	Mark Thompson	220 (−15)
4	John Wes Townley	215 (−20)
5	Patrick Sheltra	205 (−30)
6	Danica Patrick	200 (−35)
7	Ricky Carmichael	195 (−40)
8	Tommy Joe Martins	190 (−45)
9	Bryan Silas	185 (−50)
10	Steve Arpin	180 (−55)

- Note: Only the first 10 positions are included for the driver standings.

Previous race: 2009 Rockingham ARCA 200	ARCA Racing Series; 2010 season	Next race: 2010 Kingdom Tire 150
