= 2013 CNBC Prime's The Profit 200 =

17th race of the 2013 NASCAR Nationwide Series

Race details
- Race 17 of 33 of the 2013 NASCAR Nationwide Series
- Date: July 13, 2013
- Official name: 24th Annual CNBC Prime's The Profit 200
- Location: Loudon, New Hampshire, New Hampshire Motor Speedway
- Course: Permanent racing facility
- Course length: 1.058 miles (1.703 km)
- Distance: 213 laps, 225.354 mi (362.672 km)
- Scheduled distance: 200 laps, 211.6 mi (340.537 km)
- Average speed: 105.087 miles per hour (169.121 km/h)

Pole position
Driver	Kyle Busch	Joe Gibbs Racing
- Time: 28.873

Most laps led
Driver	Kyle Busch	Joe Gibbs Racing
- Laps: 141

Winner
No. 54	Kyle Busch	Joe Gibbs Racing

Television in the United States
- Network: ABC
- Announcers: Marty Reid, Dale Jarrett, Andy Petree

Radio in the United States
- Radio: Performance Racing Network

The 2013 CNBC Prime's The Profit 200 was the 17th stock car race of the 2013 NASCAR Nationwide Series and the 24th iteration of the event. The race was held on Saturday, July 13, 2013, in Loudon, New Hampshire, at New Hampshire Motor Speedway a 1.058 miles (1.703 km) permanent, oval-shaped, low-banked racetrack. The race was extended from its scheduled 200 laps to 2013 due to multiple green–white–checker finishes. At race's end, Kyle Busch, driving for Joe Gibbs Racing, would defend the field on a drama-filled final restart to complete a dominant run in the race. The win was Busch's 58th career NASCAR Nationwide Series win and his seventh win of the season. To fill out the podium, Brian Vickers of Joe Gibbs Racing and Austin Dillon of Richard Childress Racing would finish second and third, respectively.

== Background ==
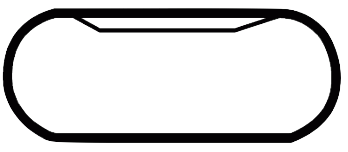
The layout of New Hampshire Motor Speedway, the venue where the race was held.

New Hampshire Motor Speedway is a 1.058-mile (1.703 km) oval speedway located in Loudon, New Hampshire, which has hosted NASCAR racing annually since the early 1990s, as well as the longest-running motorcycle race in North America, the Loudon Classic. Nicknamed "The Magic Mile", the speedway is often converted into a 1.6-mile (2.6 km) road course, which includes much of the oval.

The track was originally the site of Bryar Motorsports Park before being purchased and redeveloped by Bob Bahre. The track is currently one of eight major NASCAR tracks owned and operated by Speedway Motorsports.

=== Entry list ===
- (R) denotes rookie driver.
- (i) denotes driver who is ineligible for series driver points.

#	Driver	Team	Make	Sponsor
00	Blake Koch	SR² Motorsports	Toyota	M&W Transportation
01	Mike Wallace	JD Motorsports	Chevrolet	JD Motorsports
2	Brian Scott	Richard Childress Racing	Chevrolet	Shore Lodge
3	Austin Dillon	Richard Childress Racing	Chevrolet	AdvoCare
4	Landon Cassill	JD Motorsports	Chevrolet	JD Motorsports
5	Kasey Kahne (i)	JR Motorsports	Chevrolet	Great Clips
6	Trevor Bayne	Roush Fenway Racing	Ford	Cargill "Our Certified Ground Beef"
7	Regan Smith	JR Motorsports	Chevrolet	TaxSlayer
8	Ryan Preece	Tommy Baldwin Racing	Chevrolet	East West Marine
10	Jeff Green	TriStar Motorsports	Toyota	TriStar Motorsports
11	Elliott Sadler	Joe Gibbs Racing	Toyota	Sport Clips Haircuts
12	Sam Hornish Jr.	Penske Racing	Ford	Alliance Truck Parts
14	Eric McClure	TriStar Motorsports	Toyota	Hefty, Reynolds Wrap
15	Carl Long*	Rick Ware Racing	Ford	FAIR Girls
16	Billy Johnson	Roush Fenway Racing	Ford	NESN "Boston Strong"
18	Matt Kenseth (i)	Joe Gibbs Racing	Toyota	Dollar General
19	Mike Bliss	TriStar Motorsports	Toyota	TriStar Motorsports
20	Brian Vickers	Joe Gibbs Racing	Toyota	Dollar General
22	Joey Logano (i)	Penske Racing	Ford	Hertz
23	Stanton Barrett	Rick Ware Racing	Chevrolet	Qolix
24	Brett Butler	SR² Motorsports	Toyota	Taylor Brooks Salon, Five Star Lodge & Stables
30	Nelson Piquet Jr. (R)	Turner Scott Motorsports	Chevrolet	Qualcomm
31	Justin Allgaier	Turner Scott Motorsports	Chevrolet	Brandt Professional Agriculture
32	Kyle Larson (R)	Turner Scott Motorsports	Chevrolet	McDonald's
33	Paul Menard (i)	Richard Childress Racing	Chevrolet	Menards, Rheem
40	Reed Sorenson	The Motorsports Group	Chevrolet	Swisher E-Cigarette
42	Josh Wise	The Motorsports Group	Chevrolet	The Motorsports Group
43	Michael Annett	Richard Petty Motorsports	Ford	Pilot Travel Centers
44	Chad Hackenbracht (i)	TriStar Motorsports	Toyota	Tastee Apple
46	J. J. Yeley (i)	The Motorsports Group	Chevrolet	The Motorsports Group
51	Jeremy Clements	Jeremy Clements Racing	Chevrolet	RepairableVehicles.com
52	Joey Gase	Jimmy Means Racing	Toyota	Donate Life
54	Kyle Busch (i)	Joe Gibbs Racing	Toyota	Monster Energy
55	Jamie Dick	Viva Motorsports	Chevrolet	Viva Motorsports
60	Travis Pastrana	Roush Fenway Racing	Ford	Roush Fenway Racing
70	Tony Raines	ML Motorsports	Toyota	ML Motorsports
74	Mike Harmon	Mike Harmon Racing	Chevrolet	Mike Harmon Racing
77	Parker Kligerman	Kyle Busch Motorsports	Toyota	North American Power
79	Jeffrey Earnhardt (R)	Go Green Racing	Ford	Oath Keepers "Live Free or Die"
87	Joe Nemechek	NEMCO Motorsports	Toyota	AM/FM Energy Wood & Pellet Stoves
89	Morgan Shepherd	Shepherd Racing Ventures	Chevrolet	Malamphy Electric, Racing with Jesus
92	Dexter Stacey (R)	KH Motorsports	Ford	Maddie's Place Rocks
99	Alex Bowman (R)	RAB Racing	Toyota	SchoolTipline
Official entry list

*Withdrew to qualify for Dexter Stacey.

== Practice ==
=== First practice ===
The first practice session was held on Friday, July 12, at 11:00 AM EST, and would last for 50 minutes. Regan Smith of JR Motorsports would set the fastest time in the session, with a lap of 29.720 and an average speed of 128.156 miles per hour (206.247 km/h).

Pos.	#	Driver	Team	Make	Time	Speed
1	7	Regan Smith	JR Motorsports	Chevrolet	29.720	128.156
2	18	Matt Kenseth (i)	Joe Gibbs Racing	Toyota	29.908	127.351
3	54	Kyle Busch (i)	Joe Gibbs Racing	Toyota	29.925	127.278
Full first practice results

=== Second and final practice ===
The second and final practice session, sometimes referred to as Happy Hour, was held on Friday, July 12, at 1:40 PM EST, and would last for one hour and 20 minutes. Regan Smith of JR Motorsports would set the fastest time in the session, with a lap of 29.330 and an average speed of 129.860 miles per hour (208.989 km/h).

Pos.	#	Driver	Team	Make	Time	Speed
1	7	Regan Smith	JR Motorsports	Chevrolet	29.330	129.860
2	12	Sam Hornish Jr.	Penske Racing	Ford	29.392	129.586
3	77	Parker Kligerman	Kyle Busch Motorsports	Toyota	29.455	129.309
Full Happy Hour practice results

== Qualifying ==
Qualifying was held on Saturday, July 13, at 10:05 AM EST. Each driver would have two laps to set a fastest time; the fastest of the two would count as their official qualifying lap.

Kyle Busch of Joe Gibbs Racing would win the pole, setting a time of 28.873 and an average speed of 131.916 miles per hour (212.298 km/h).

Two drivers would fail to qualify: Morgan Shepherd and Mike Harmon.

=== Full qualifying results ===
Pos.	#	Driver	Team	Make	Time	Speed
1	54	Kyle Busch (i)	Joe Gibbs Racing	Toyota	28.873	131.916
2	20	Brian Vickers	Joe Gibbs Racing	Toyota	29.029	131.207
3	5	Kasey Kahne (i)	JR Motorsports	Chevrolet	29.073	131.008
4	7	Regan Smith	JR Motorsports	Chevrolet	29.083	130.963
5	2	Brian Scott	Richard Childress Racing	Chevrolet	29.103	130.873
6	31	Justin Allgaier	Turner Scott Motorsports	Chevrolet	29.105	130.864
7	22	Joey Logano (i)	Penske Racing	Ford	29.106	130.860
8	18	Matt Kenseth (i)	Joe Gibbs Racing	Toyota	29.134	130.734
9	11	Elliott Sadler	Joe Gibbs Racing	Toyota	29.141	130.702
10	77	Parker Kligerman	Kyle Busch Motorsports	Toyota	29.169	130.577
11	3	Austin Dillon	Richard Childress Racing	Chevrolet	29.188	130.492
12	12	Sam Hornish Jr.	Penske Racing	Ford	29.251	130.211
13	32	Kyle Larson (R)	Turner Scott Motorsports	Chevrolet	29.335	129.838
14	6	Trevor Bayne	Roush Fenway Racing	Ford	29.345	129.794
15	30	Nelson Piquet Jr. (R)	Turner Scott Motorsports	Chevrolet	29.395	129.573
16	33	Paul Menard (i)	Richard Childress Racing	Chevrolet	29.399	129.555
17	60	Travis Pastrana	Roush Fenway Racing	Ford	29.401	129.547
18	87	Joe Nemechek	NEMCO Motorsports	Toyota	29.477	129.213
19	44	Chad Hackenbracht (i)	TriStar Motorsports	Toyota	29.521	129.020
20	19	Mike Bliss	TriStar Motorsports	Toyota	29.524	129.007
21	99	Alex Bowman (R)	RAB Racing	Toyota	29.555	128.872
22	16	Billy Johnson	Roush Fenway Racing	Ford	29.558	128.859
23	43	Michael Annett	Richard Petty Motorsports	Ford	29.582	128.754
24	4	Landon Cassill	JD Motorsports	Chevrolet	29.685	128.307
25	10	Jeff Green	TriStar Motorsports	Toyota	29.779	127.902
26	24	Brett Butler	SR² Motorsports	Toyota	29.853	127.585
27	8	Ryan Preece	Tommy Baldwin Racing	Chevrolet	29.874	127.495
28	55	Jamie Dick	Viva Motorsports	Chevrolet	29.953	127.159
29	40	Reed Sorenson	The Motorsports Group	Chevrolet	29.992	126.994
30	42	Josh Wise	The Motorsports Group	Chevrolet	30.004	126.943
31	00	Blake Koch	SR² Motorsports	Toyota	30.025	126.854
32	46	J. J. Yeley (i)	The Motorsports Group	Chevrolet	30.179	126.207
33	14	Eric McClure	TriStar Motorsports	Toyota	30.256	125.886
34	01	Mike Wallace	JD Motorsports	Chevrolet	30.261	125.865
35	51	Jeremy Clements	Jeremy Clements Racing	Chevrolet	30.274	125.811
36	79	Jeffrey Earnhardt (R)	Go Green Racing	Ford	30.293	125.732
37	52	Joey Gase	Jimmy Means Racing	Chevrolet	30.416	125.224
38	23	Stanton Barrett	Rick Ware Racing	Chevrolet	30.484	124.944
Qualified by owner's points
39	70	Tony Raines	ML Motorsports	Toyota	31.077	122.560
Last car to qualify on time
40	92	Dexter Stacey (R)	KH Motorsports	Ford	30.453	125.071
Failed to qualify or withdrew
41	89	Morgan Shepherd	Shepherd Racing Ventures	Chevrolet	31.366	121.431
42	74	Mike Harmon	Mike Harmon Racing	Chevrolet	—	—
WD	15	Carl Long	Rick Ware Racing	Ford	—	—
Official starting lineup

== Race results ==
Fin.	St	#	Driver	Team	Make	Laps	Led	Status	Pts	Winnings
1	1	54	Kyle Busch (i)	Joe Gibbs Racing	Toyota	213	141	running	0	$46,700
2	2	20	Brian Vickers	Joe Gibbs Racing	Toyota	213	63	running	43	$35,775
3	11	3	Austin Dillon	Richard Childress Racing	Chevrolet	213	0	running	41	$31,450
4	5	2	Brian Scott	Richard Childress Racing	Chevrolet	213	0	running	40	$26,700
5	23	43	Michael Annett	Richard Petty Motorsports	Ford	213	0	running	39	$23,100
6	14	6	Trevor Bayne	Roush Fenway Racing	Ford	213	0	running	38	$20,075
7	12	12	Sam Hornish Jr.	Penske Racing	Ford	213	0	running	37	$19,625
8	4	7	Regan Smith	JR Motorsports	Chevrolet	213	0	running	36	$19,525
9	8	18	Matt Kenseth (i)	Joe Gibbs Racing	Toyota	213	9	running	0	$13,100
10	21	99	Alex Bowman (R)	RAB Racing	Toyota	213	0	running	34	$20,825
11	7	22	Joey Logano (i)	Penske Racing	Ford	213	0	running	0	$12,850
12	15	30	Nelson Piquet Jr. (R)	Turner Scott Motorsports	Chevrolet	213	0	running	32	$19,050
13	6	31	Justin Allgaier	Turner Scott Motorsports	Chevrolet	213	0	running	31	$18,575
14	13	32	Kyle Larson (R)	Turner Scott Motorsports	Chevrolet	213	0	running	30	$18,325
15	22	16	Billy Johnson	Roush Fenway Racing	Ford	213	0	running	29	$19,375
16	17	60	Travis Pastrana	Roush Fenway Racing	Ford	213	0	running	28	$18,075
17	20	19	Mike Bliss	TriStar Motorsports	Toyota	213	0	running	27	$17,950
18	9	11	Elliott Sadler	Joe Gibbs Racing	Toyota	213	0	running	26	$18,800
19	3	5	Kasey Kahne (i)	JR Motorsports	Chevrolet	211	0	running	0	$12,250
20	10	77	Parker Kligerman	Kyle Busch Motorsports	Toyota	211	0	running	24	$18,375
21	19	44	Chad Hackenbracht (i)	TriStar Motorsports	Toyota	211	0	running	0	$17,600
22	18	87	Joe Nemechek	NEMCO Motorsports	Toyota	211	0	running	22	$17,550
23	35	51	Jeremy Clements	Jeremy Clements Racing	Chevrolet	210	0	running	21	$17,500
24	27	8	Ryan Preece	Tommy Baldwin Racing	Chevrolet	209	0	running	20	$11,435
25	36	79	Jeffrey Earnhardt (R)	Go Green Racing	Ford	208	0	running	19	$17,875
26	40	92	Dexter Stacey (R)	KH Motorsports	Ford	208	0	running	18	$17,365
27	38	23	Stanton Barrett	Rick Ware Racing	Chevrolet	208	0	running	17	$17,330
28	34	01	Mike Wallace	JD Motorsports	Chevrolet	208	0	running	16	$17,295
29	39	70	Tony Raines	ML Motorsports	Toyota	208	0	running	15	$17,260
30	24	4	Landon Cassill	JD Motorsports	Chevrolet	207	0	running	14	$17,525
31	33	14	Eric McClure	TriStar Motorsports	Toyota	207	0	running	13	$17,190
32	16	33	Paul Menard (i)	Richard Childress Racing	Chevrolet	205	0	crash	0	$11,155
33	37	52	Joey Gase	Jimmy Means Racing	Chevrolet	144	0	electrical	11	$11,135
34	29	40	Reed Sorenson	The Motorsports Group	Chevrolet	126	0	engine	10	$17,115
35	28	55	Jamie Dick	Viva Motorsports	Chevrolet	117	0	engine	9	$17,068
36	26	24	Brett Butler	SR² Motorsports	Toyota	100	0	crash	8	$16,345
37	31	00	Blake Koch	SR² Motorsports	Toyota	99	0	brakes	7	$16,325
38	30	42	Josh Wise	The Motorsports Group	Chevrolet	10	0	brakes	6	$10,311
39	32	46	J. J. Yeley (i)	The Motorsports Group	Chevrolet	7	0	vibration	0	$10,190
40	25	10	Jeff Green	TriStar Motorsports	Toyota	3	0	vibration	4	$10,105
Failed to qualify or withdrew
41		89	Morgan Shepherd	Shepherd Racing Ventures	Chevrolet					
42		74	Mike Harmon	Mike Harmon Racing	Chevrolet					
WD		15	Carl Long	Rick Ware Racing	Ford					
Official race results

Previous race: 2013 Subway Firecracker 250	NASCAR Nationwide Series; 2013 season	Next race: 2013 STP 300
