= Daily Voice =

Daily Voice, or The Daily Voice, may refer to one of several news entities:

- Daily Voice (South African newspaper), a Western Cape tabloid newspaper started in 2005
- The Daily Voice (African American news website), a defunct U.S. online news site started in 2008
- Daily Voice (American hyperlocal news), a U.S. online hyperlocal news site started in 2010 as Main Street Connect

== See also ==
- Dnevni avaz (English: Daily Voice), a Sarajevo daily newspaper started in 1993
