= William Arthur Smith =

American artist (1918–1989)

- Born: April 19, 1918; Toledo, Ohio, U.S.
- Died: April 27, 1989 (aged 71)
- Education: University of Toledo
- Occupation: Artist
- Spouse(s): Mary France Nixon (m. 1939) Ferol Yvonne Stratton (m. 1949)
- Children: 3

William Arthur Smith (April 19, 1918 – April 27, 1989) was an American artist.

== Early life ==
Smith was born in Toledo, Ohio. He studied at the Theodore Keane School of Art in Toledo from 1932 to 1936 and at the University of Toledo from 1936 to 1937, receiving an honorary master of arts degree in 1954. He married Mary France Nixon in 1939, with whom he had one son, Richard Keane. Smith's second marriage in 1949 to Ferol Yvonne Stratton produced two girls, Kim and Kathlin Alexandra.

== Career ==
After working a year for newspapers, Smith moved to New York City in 1937 and established his first studio there. He was an instructor at the Grand Central School of Art (1942–43) before joining the Office of Strategic Services in China in 1944 and 1945. He lectured abroad at the Academy of Fine Arts, Athens (1954); the University of Santo Tomas, Manila (1955); and the Academy of Fine Arts, Warsaw (1958). In 1954 he was an official delegate to the International Association of Plastic Arts in Venice, and in 1958 he became a member and official delegate to the Soviet Union under a cultural exchange agreement.

== Work and exhibitions ==
Smith's work is represented in the Metropolitan Museum of Art, New York, the National Portrait Gallery, Washington, D.C., the Library of Congress, Washington, D.C., and the James A. Michener Art Museum in Doylestown, Pennsylvania, and was the subject of solo exhibitions at the Toledo Museum of Art (1942 and 1952), at Bucknell University (1952) and in foreign cities in the 1960s and 1970s. He executed an historical mural for the State of Maryland in 1968; illustrated United States postage stamps on historical subjects; authored a book about the sculptor Gerd Utescher; and produced illustrations for American magazines. From 1968 to 1973, he served a vice president on the board of directors of Pearl Buck's Welcome House.

== Awards, recognitions, and affiliations ==
Smith was the recipient of the Adolf and Clara Obrig Prize for oil painting (1953); American Artists Group Prize for lithography at the Society of American Graphic Artists (1954), Knobloch Prize (1956), Winslow Homer Memorial Prize (1962), American Patriots' Medal (1974), and Postal Commemorative Society Prize (1974). He became a Dolphin Fellow in 1975.

Smith served in many positions as a member of the International Association of Art, including U.S. delegate in 1963, 1966, 1969, and 1973; member of the executive committee from 1963 to 1969, president of the executive committee from 1973 to 1976, and honorary president of the same in 1977. He was president of the U.S. committee from 1970 to 1977, for which he was elected honorary president in 1977.

As a member of the National Academy of Design, he served as secretary in 1954–55 and as a member of council from 1953 to 1956, and he received the National Academy of Design watercolor award in 1949 and 1951. For the American Watercolor Society he acted as trustee in 1949, president in 1956–57, and honorary president in 1957, and received the Silver Medal in 1948, 1952, and 1973; the Stuart Watercolor Prize in 1954; the Gold Medal in 1957 and 1965; and the Bronze Medal in 1972.

Smith was also a member of the California Watercolor Society, Audubon Artists, Philadelphia Watercolor Club, National Society of Mural Painters, and Dutch Treat Club.

== Notes and references ==
- Paone, Peter; Eliot, Alexander; McIntosh, Elizabeth; Cong, Ding; Gruppo, Nelson; Brisco, Paula (1996), William A. Smith: A Retrospective, James A. Michener Museum. Bucks County, Pennsylvania, Doylestown, PA: James A. Michener Art Museum, ISBN 1-879636-06-9
