= List of companies based in Norwalk, Connecticut =

This is a list of large or well-known interstate or international companies in the Norwalk, Connecticut area. Norwalk is home to a Fortune 500 company, EMCOR.

== Companies currently headquartered in Norwalk, Connecticut ==
=== Publishing ===
- Abaris Books
- The Daily Voice
- Easton Press

=== Travel ===
- Booking Holdings
- HEI Hotels & Resorts
- Priceline.com
- Tower Optical

=== Financial ===
- Danbury Mint
- FactSet
- Financial Accounting Foundation

=== Accessories ===
- Dooney & Bourke

=== Technology ===
- Applera (defunct)
- Datto
- EMCOR
- Frontier Communications
- North American Power
- Media Storm
- Ventus
- Xerox
- Potoo Solutions

=== Food ===
- Pepperidge Farm
- Sclafani Foods
- Stew Leonard's
