= Sclafani Foods =

Italian foods brand

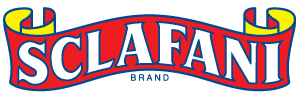
- Industry: Wholesale (Food)
- Founder: Gus Sclafani
- Products: Extra Virgin Olive Oil, Pasta, San Marzano tomato, and Vinegar
- Website: http://www.sclafanifoods.net/

Sclafani Foods is an importer of Italian specialty foods which includes flagship products such as extra virgin olive oil, pasta, San Marzano tomatoes, and vinegar. Based out of Norwalk, Connecticut, the Gus Sclafani Corporation distributes their products across the United States, primarily in the Northeast.

== Company history ==
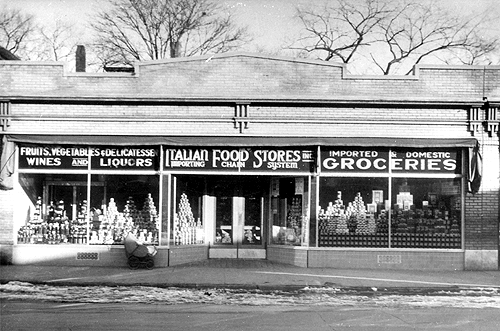
Sclafani's Italian Food Stores, 175A W. Main Street. Stamford, Connecticut, c.1930

Founder Gus Sclafani introduced the Sclafani brand in 1911, which included a wide array of imported authentic Italian specialty food products.

In December 2001 the editors of Food & Wine held a blind taste test of 18 brands and The Gus Sclafani Corporation's minestrone emerged as a favorite.

In late 2008 the Gus Sclafani Corporation helps cement standards for olive oil. On November 5, Connecticut was the first state to adopt regulations to establish a standard of identity for olive oil products sold in the state.

In October 2010 The Gus Sclafani Corporation's tomatoes were selected as a Chef Pick for Essential Italian Ingredients in Food & Wine.

The Gus Sclafani Corporation celebrated its centennial anniversary in 2011 and was featured in the Norwalk Hour.

CEO and President of The Gus Sclafani Corporation Luciano Sclafani Jr. was selected as grand marshal of the 2013 Columbus Day Parade.

== See also ==
- List of companies based in Norwalk, Connecticut
