= Jane Bryant Quinn =

American journalist

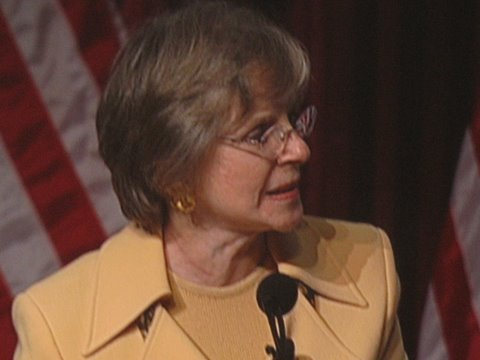
- Born: February 5, 1939 (age 87); Niagara Falls, New York, U.S.
- Education: Middlebury College
- Occupation: Journalist
- Spouses: David C. Quinn (died); Carll Tucker (m. 2008)
- Children: 2 biological and 3 stepchildren, including Martha Quinn
- Awards: Gerald Loeb Award (1995)

Jane Bryant Quinn (born February 5, 1939) is an American financial journalist. Her columns talk about financial topics such as investor protection, health insurance, Social Security, and the sufficiency of retirement plans.

== Biography ==
She was born in Niagara Falls, New York, and graduated magna cum laude from Middlebury College in Vermont, where she was a member of Pi Beta Phi fraternity for women. She is a contributing editor for Newsweek, where she wrote a biweekly column for 30 years, retiring it in 2009. She also writes a bimonthly column for Bloomberg.com.

Her twice-weekly, syndicated Washington Post Writers Group column, "Staying Ahead", ran for 27 years in over 250 newspapers until she opted to reduce her workload in 2001. Quinn was co-founder, editor and general manager of McGraw-Hill's "Personal Finance Letter." She was a reporter, then a co-editor of the consumer publication, "The Insider's Newsletter," formerly published by Cowles Communications. She worked for CBS News, first on The CBS Morning News, then on The CBS Evening News with Dan Rather. She has been a regular on ABC's The Home Show as well as a guest on Good Morning America, Nightline, and other programs.

She has also written personal finance columns for Woman's Day and Good Housekeeping. She hosted the PBS program on personal finance, Take Charge, and co-hosted an investment series Beyond Wall Street, also on PBS.

She helped develop the software program Quicken Financial Planner.

She has served on the boards of the Harvard School of Public Health, the Jerome Levy Economics Institute of Bard College and her alma mater, Middlebury College. She is currently a director of Bloomberg L.P., the financial services company, and of GSE Systems, Inc. The World Almanac named her one of the 25 most influential and powerful women in America.

Starting in 2010, Quinn became editorial director of hyperlocal media startup Main Street Connect, where she is also a member of its board of directors.

Her late husband, David C. Quinn, was a lawyer. She has two sons, Matthew Ostrowski and Justin Quinn. She has three stepchildren, David P. Quinn, Martha Quinn, and Christopher Quinn. She married author Carll Tucker in 2008.

== Awards ==
- 1979 Supersisters trading card set (one of the cards featured Quinn's name and picture)
- 1981, 1982, 1984, National Press Club's Consumer Journalism Award
- 1983 Matrix Award in Magazines
- 1984 New York State Award for Women of Distinction in the Field of Journalism
- 1986 National Headliner Award for Consistently Outstanding Magazine Feature Column
- 1987 Consumer Federation of America's Outstanding Consumer Media Service Award
- 1992, 1995 John Hancock Award for Excellence in Business and Financial Journalism
- 1995 Gerald Loeb Award for Commentary
- 1995 ICI Education Foundation American University Journalism Award for Excellence in Personal Finance Reporting
- 1997 Gerald Loeb Lifetime Achievement Award
- 1997, 1998 "100 Most Influential Business Journalists" – The Journalist and Financial Reporter newsletter
- 2005 National Consumers League Trumpeter Award for Consumer Journalism

== Books ==
- 1978 Everyone's Money Book (Delacorte Press)
- 1991 Making the Most of Your Money (Simon & Schuster)
- 1994 A Hole in the Market (The Whittle Company)
- 1997 Making the Most of Your Money (2nd edition)
- 2006 Smart and Simple Financial Strategies for Busy People (Simon & Schuster)
- 2009 Making the Most of Your Money – Completely Revised (3rd edition)
- 2016 How to Make Your Money Last (Simon & Schuster)
