= Ventus (wireless company) =

Ventus Wireless LLC
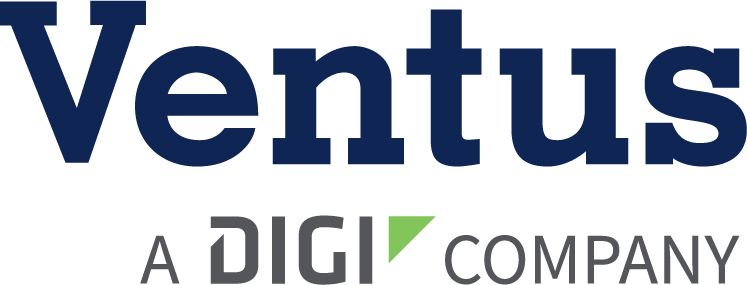
- Type: Private
- Industry: Telecommunication
- Founded: New York City, New York, U.S. (1999)
- Founder: Keith Charette
- Headquarters: Norwalk, Connecticut
- Products: Wireless Services; Wireless Hardware; Telecommunication Services
- Parent: Digi International
- Website: http://www.ventusgns.com

Ventus is an American company founded in 1999 and headquartered in Norwalk, Connecticut that provides secure private line Wireless services, and manufactures cellular wireless hardware.

== Services ==
Ventus provides managed networks for cellular wireless networking and fixed line services including PCI-DSS (Payment Card Industry) compliant data transport, integration services, data encryption, and integrated network administration and monitoring systems. Ventus' IT services are delivered via products developed by the company's network hardware technologies division.

== Ventus Technologies ==
Ventus Technologies designs and manufactures cellular routers and other wireless hardware for machine-to-machine and enterprise wireless applications. Ventus' hardware includes dual-carrier, modular, multi-interface embedded wireless 4G LTE/3G routers and multi-band cellular antennas.

== See also ==
- List of companies based in Norwalk, Connecticut
