= Danbury Mint =

American private mint

- Company type: Subsidiary
- Founded: 1969
- Founder: Ralph Glendinning; Ted Stanley
- Headquarters: Norwalk, Connecticut
- Website: www.danburymint.com

Danbury Mint is a private mint that markets a variety of collectibles. Danbury Mint historically marketed medals and ingots produced by others exclusively for them. The company also sold numerous other collectible offering including plates, bells, sculptures, etc. Danbury Mint is well known for its 1:24 scale die-cast vehicles, including a now discontinued James Bond's DB5.

== History ==
The Danbury Mint was founded in Westport, Connecticut, by Ralph Glendinning and Ted Stanley in 1969, as a subsidiary of Glendinning Companies. Their first product was a series of medals commemorating the Apollo 11 Moon landing.

The Danbury Mint has since created many commemorative items—figurines, collector plates, dolls, die-cast cars, etc.—based on historical events and people. Examples include, Shirley Temple, Princess Diana, Barack Obama's inauguration, Corvettes, Hummel figurines, and gold Christmas ornaments.

Danbury's first sister division was formed in 1970 under the name Postal Commemorative Society, changed to PCS Stamps & Coins in 2006 to reflect a shift in the product mix from stamps to coin related products. In 1973, both divisions were incorporated as MBI. In 1975 Easton Press was formed as MBI's third division, and MBI was spun off from Glendinning Companies as a separate company.

== See also ==
- List of companies based in Norwalk, Connecticut
