= Media Storm =

Media Storm, LLC
- Industry: Advertising agency Marketing agency
- Founded: November 2001; 23 years ago
- Founders: Tim Williams; Craig Woerz
- Headquarters: Norwalk, Connecticut, United States
- Revenue: $72.5 million (2005)
- Website: mediastorm.biz

Media Storm, LLC is an American advertising and marketing company, in New York City, Los Angeles, and Norwalk, Connecticut, that helps entertainment marketers identify advertising vehicles, and then helps place the ads. The company also helps retailers place advertisements and markets video-on-demand programming.

According to Inc. magazine, Media Storm had $72.5 million.

The company has attracted clients including Tribune Entertainment, The Golf Channel, Speed Channel, Showtime Networks, Gold's Gym International, and the mortgage finance company Finance America.. The agency also specializes in advertising for entertainment clients and is the agency of record for: Fox, MTV, WE TV, Food Network, FX and TruTV.

It is unrelated to the Brooklyn, New York, multimedia publisher MediaStorm.

== History ==
Media Storm was founded in November 2001 by managing partners Tim Williams and Craig Woerz, who formerly worked together at AOL Time Warner. One of the company's early projects was helping to promote the debut of the FX cable television program The Shield.

In May 2003, the company was ranked 14th on Entrepreneur magazine and Dun & Bradstreet's "Hot 100" list of fastest-growing entrepreneurial companies in the United States. In 2006, the company made Inc. magazine's "Inc. 500" list of fast-growing companies, coming in at No. 106, with 869.7% growth over three years.

The company is headquartered at 99 Washington Street, in the South Norwalk section of Norwalk, Connecticut and also has an office at 170 Varick Street in New York, NY.

In February 2020, Media Storm was acquired by Dentsu Aegis Network.

== See also ==
- List of companies based in Norwalk, Connecticut
