= Ted Stanley =

American entrepreneur and philanthropist (1931–2016)

- Born: April 26, 1931; Reading, Pennsylvania
- Died: January 3, 2016 (aged 84)
- Education: University of Pennsylvania

Theodore Richard Stanley (April 26, 1931 – January 3, 2016) was an American entrepreneur and philanthropist. He co-founded the Danbury Mint with business partner Ralph Glendinning, which was then a subsidiary of MBI Inc.

== Early life ==
Stanley was born in Reading, Pennsylvania, and graduated from University of Pennsylvania. He served in the United States Air Force and was an intelligence officer. Stanley worked for Procter & Gamble in the marketing division in Cincinnati, Ohio.

== Business ==
In 1969 Stanley co-founded the Danbury Mint, which sells collectibles (such as commemorative postage stamps, decorative plates, medals, commemorative coins, and similar items) it has produced for it by mail order.

The Mint's first product was a medal series that commemorated the Apollo 11 first crewed Moon landing. After this, the business continued to expand, enough to make Stanley a billionaire during his lifetime.

=== Connection to mental health ===
In 1988, Stanley's son was diagnosed with bipolar disorder at the age of 19 after having a psychiatric episode that saw him running around New York streets for 3 days and stripping off his clothes in public. His son was eventually helped with a lithium treatment, and eventually finished college and law school, but during the course of his son's treatment he met many parents who were not so lucky, whose children did not improve after treatment. In response, Stanley started donating to mental health research.

== Philanthropy ==
Stanley died in his sleep in New Canaan, Connecticut. Before he died, Stanley made a large donation to the Broad Institute of Cambridge, MA of approximately $650 million for research into genetic markers of mental health. It is recognized as one of the largest private donations ever to support scientific research and the largest ever for mental health research. Before his estates large $650 million donation, which comprised the majority of Stanley's financial holdings, he had periodically donated an additional $175 million, making his lifetime contribution to the Broad Institute $825 million, to support work and research.
