= Tower Optical =

The Tower Optical Company
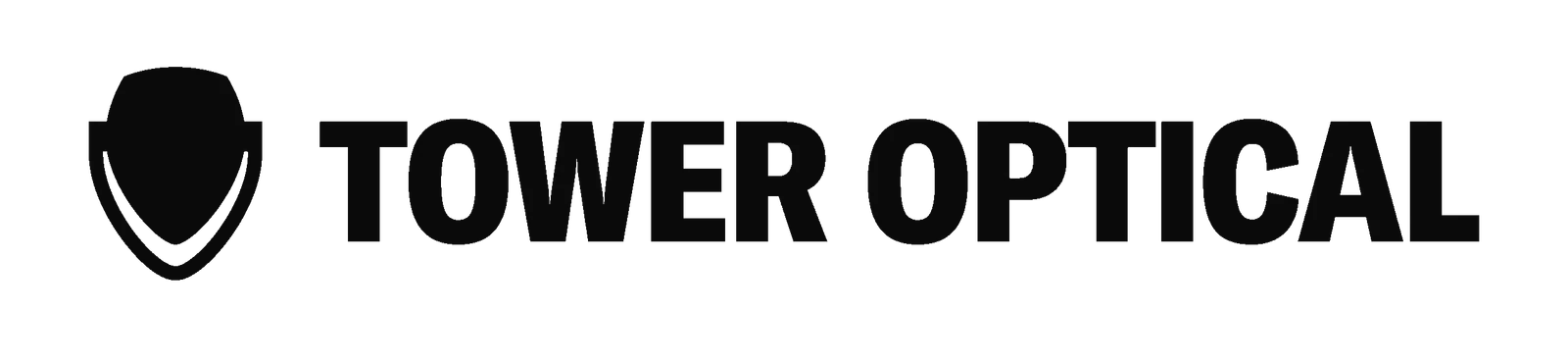
- Industry: Telescopes, optical viewers
- Founded: 1933 in Norwalk, Connecticut, United States
- Founder: Towers S. Hamilton
- Headquarters: Norwalk, Connecticut
- Area served: United States, Canada
- Website: toweropticalco.com

The Tower Optical Company is a small, Norwalk, Connecticut-based company which has manufactured a binocular viewers used at major tourist sites in the United States and Canada since 1933. The company's large, silver-colored devices are used at Niagara Falls, the Empire State Building, Rockefeller Center, Golden Gate Bridge, the Grand Canyon, and other locations.

Several thousand of the binocular viewers are maintained by the company or its partners. Tower Optical has various arrangements with owners of the sites where the devices are located. Where the viewers are free, they are leased; at other locations, revenue is shared between the company and the site owner. Each machine can hold up to 2,000 quarters. The binocular machine has essentially kept its distinctive, tubby shape since it was first manufactured, a deliberate strategy "to preserve its identity", according to Bonnie Rising, the third-generation owner of the family business. When coin-operated, the machines can be timed for roughly 1.5 to 2.5 minutes. As of June 2025, the company's new ownership group is actively working on incorporating tap-to-pay technology in its flagship product.

== Operations ==
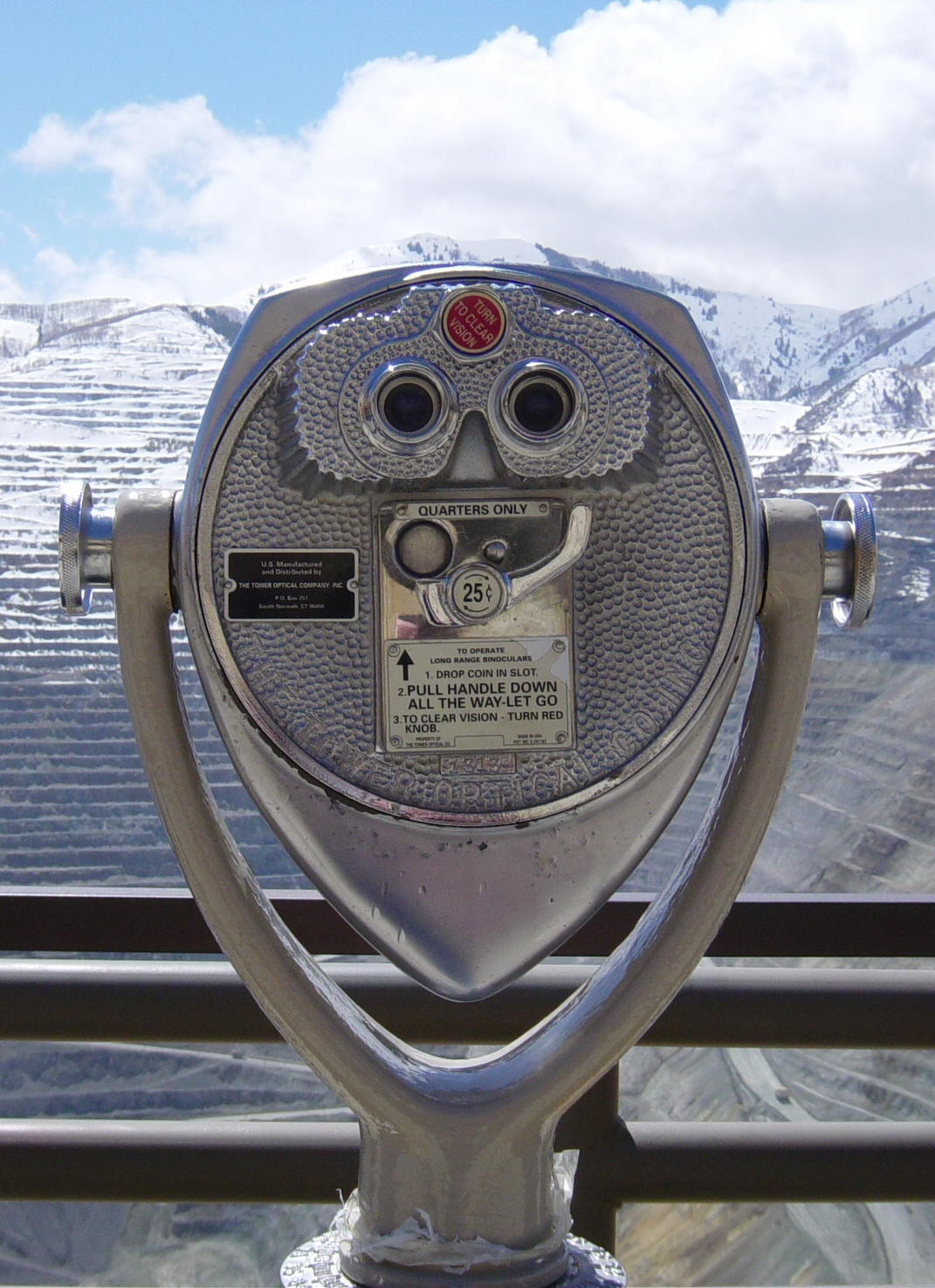
One of Tower Optical's coin-operated binoculars in Utah

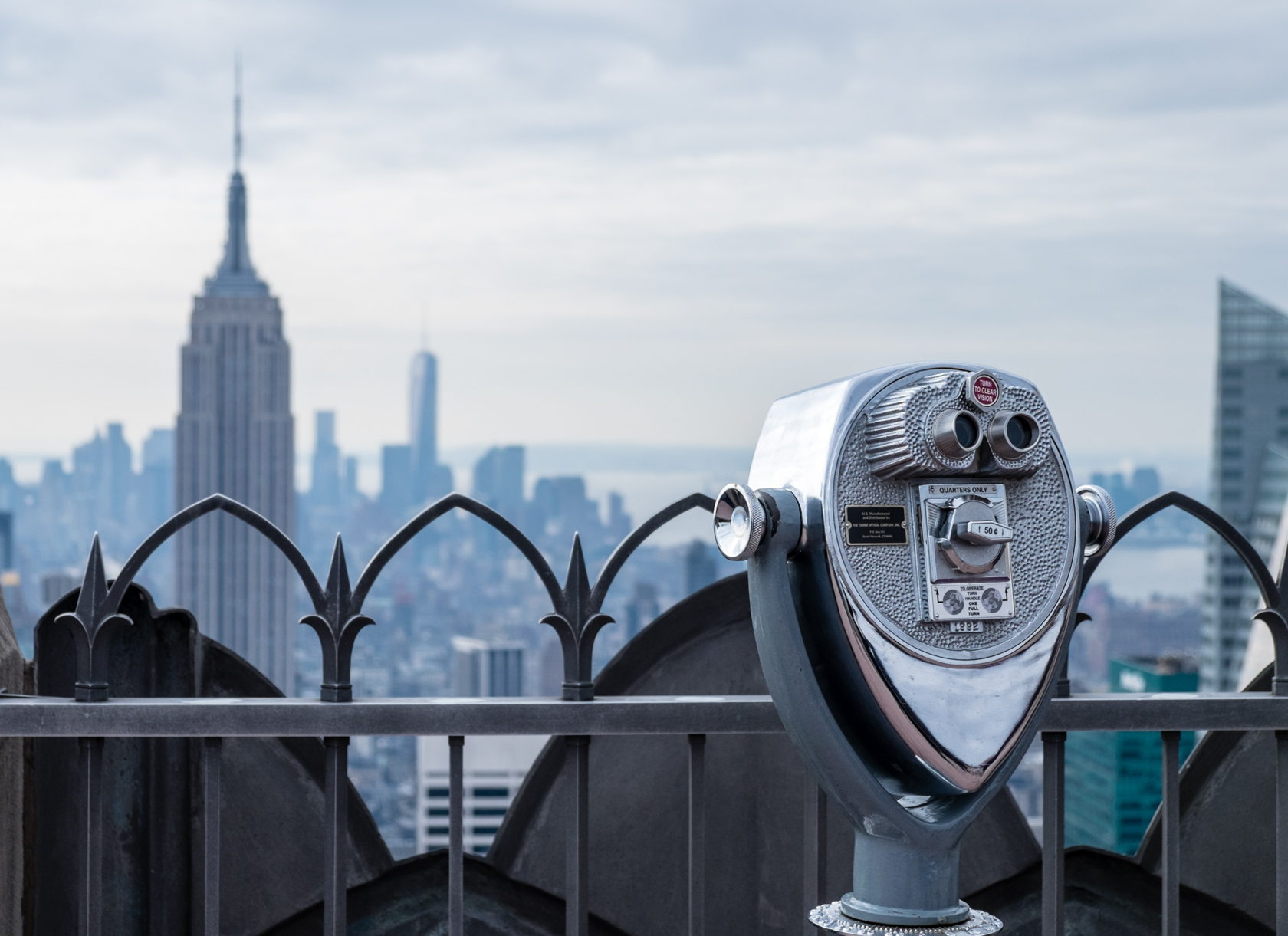
A Tower Optical viewer on the observation deck of Manhattan's GE Building

A foundry in Pennsylvania manufactures the parts used for Tower's viewers, about 35 of which are assembled each year in its two-story building in East Norwalk. The company maintains several thousand of the devices, sometimes removing some in the fall, rebuilding them and returning them in the spring.

A typical viewer is housed in a chrome-plated, bronze-cast shell mounted on a cast iron yoke and pedestal. The inside of the machine is bronze and stainless steel. The binoculars can be raised 45 degrees up, 22 degrees down and swung entirely left or right by 360 degrees. The device and its pedestal typically stand 63 inches high and weigh 300 pounds.

The company limits its distribution of the machines to the United States and Canada for easier management.

As of 2004, the devices were in use in San Francisco at Vista Point at the Golden Gate Bridge and at Coit Tower. That year, the City of Sausalito, California was considering installing five of the machines on its bay waterfront as a fund-raising move. Former Mayor J. R. Roberts, a member of a citizens committee which suggested the installation, said the machines typically cost a user 50 cents, with the city collecting half of the revenue if it took on the responsibility of collecting the coins, or 30 percent if Tower arranged for collection. Each machine was expected to earn somewhere between $1,200 and $10,000 per year. The price and length of viewing time could be customized, he said. Paul Albritton, then mayor of Sausalito, said, "In some areas, telescopes earn a few hundred dollars a month and in other places a few thousand dollars a month."

== History ==
The company was founded by Towers S. Hamilton in 1933 in his Norwalk machine shop. He bought the shop from its owner-founders, Arthur Casey, Earl Bunnell, and John Hanrahan, soon after Hamilton started machining the parts for the viewers. His son, Towers W. Hamilton, later became the owner. His wife, Gladys (Kip) Hamilton, worked with him in the business for many years and on his death in 1989, she took over the company. She died in 2006, and at some point she passed the business on to her daughter, Bonnie Rising, who still owned the company as of 2010, when she had six employees, including her son, Gregory, and her husband, Douglas, who help run the business. Bonnie Rising said in 2010 that she expected her son to take over the business someday.

Local institutions and organizations have given the company recognition for its "iconic" devices. By 2002, the company had donated one of its viewers to the nearby Norwalk Museum in South Norwalk. In 2008, the business was the subject of a lecture, "An American Icon: Norwalk's Tower Optical Company," given to the Norwalk Historical Society.

In 2004 and 2005, the company worked with an artist as part of a project in which 10 companies teamed up with "in residence" artists "to see how technology, be it vintage or cutting-edge, can inform art in the 21st century", as a New York Times article described it. Artist Michael Oatman accompanied workers making 5 a.m. repair runs to tourist locations and "videotaped people as they fantasized about what they would most like to see with the binoculars", according to the newspaper. An exhibition, titled, Factory Direct: New Haven, about the project took place at Artspace in New Haven. Tower Optical also made a lightweight viewer for Oatman to install temporarily at tourist sites.

By 2010, business had declined because of an ongoing recession, but, in July, Rising said a turnaround seemed to be taking place.

In June 2025, Tower Optical was acquired by partners Adam Rice, Adam Vojdany, Rodrigo Canahuati and Dom Puglisi. The new ownership group has emphasized preserving the company's historic role in American sightseeing while modernizing its operations for the future. The company continues to service and restore its existing binocular viewers and has begun developing a tap-to-pay version of its iconic machines. This effort is part of a broader initiative to integrate modern technology into the business and enhance the experience for visitors at tourist destinations worldwide.

== See also ==
- List of companies based in Norwalk, Connecticut
