= PCS Stamps & Coins =

American philatelic organization

- Type: Subsidiary
- Founded: 1970
- Founder: Ted Stanley
- Headquarters: Norwalk, Connecticut
- Products: Coins, paper money and stamps
- Website: www.pcscoins.com

PCS Stamps & Coins, formerly known as the Postal Commemorative Society, is an American company that sells collectible stamps, coins, and other memorabilia. Their products include collectibles including U.S. silver dollars, other historic U.S. coins, State Quarters, mint condition U.S. stamps, and U.S. paper money. The company is headquartered in Norwalk, Connecticut.

== History ==
The Postal Commemorative Society ("PCS") was first formed in 1970 as a division of MBI. Its first product was U.S. first day of issue covers.

In 1973, MBI was still a subsidiary of Glendinning Companies. It consisted of two divisions, the Postal Commemorative Society and the Danbury Mint. In December 1975, MBI ended its legal ties with Glendinning and became an independent business. Easton Press was formed in 1975 as MBI's third division.

In the late 1900s, the company sold so-called "Golden Replicas of US Stamps", which were first day covers of stamps accompanied by an extremely thin (less than paper-thin) gold stamp of similar design. There is so little gold in these stamps that they are still worth less than the cost of extracting the gold from its aluminum or paper backing.

In 2006, the Postal Commemorative Society changed its name to PCS Stamps & Coins to reflect the shift in its product offers.
