= Tower viewer =

Lens mounted at a scenic location

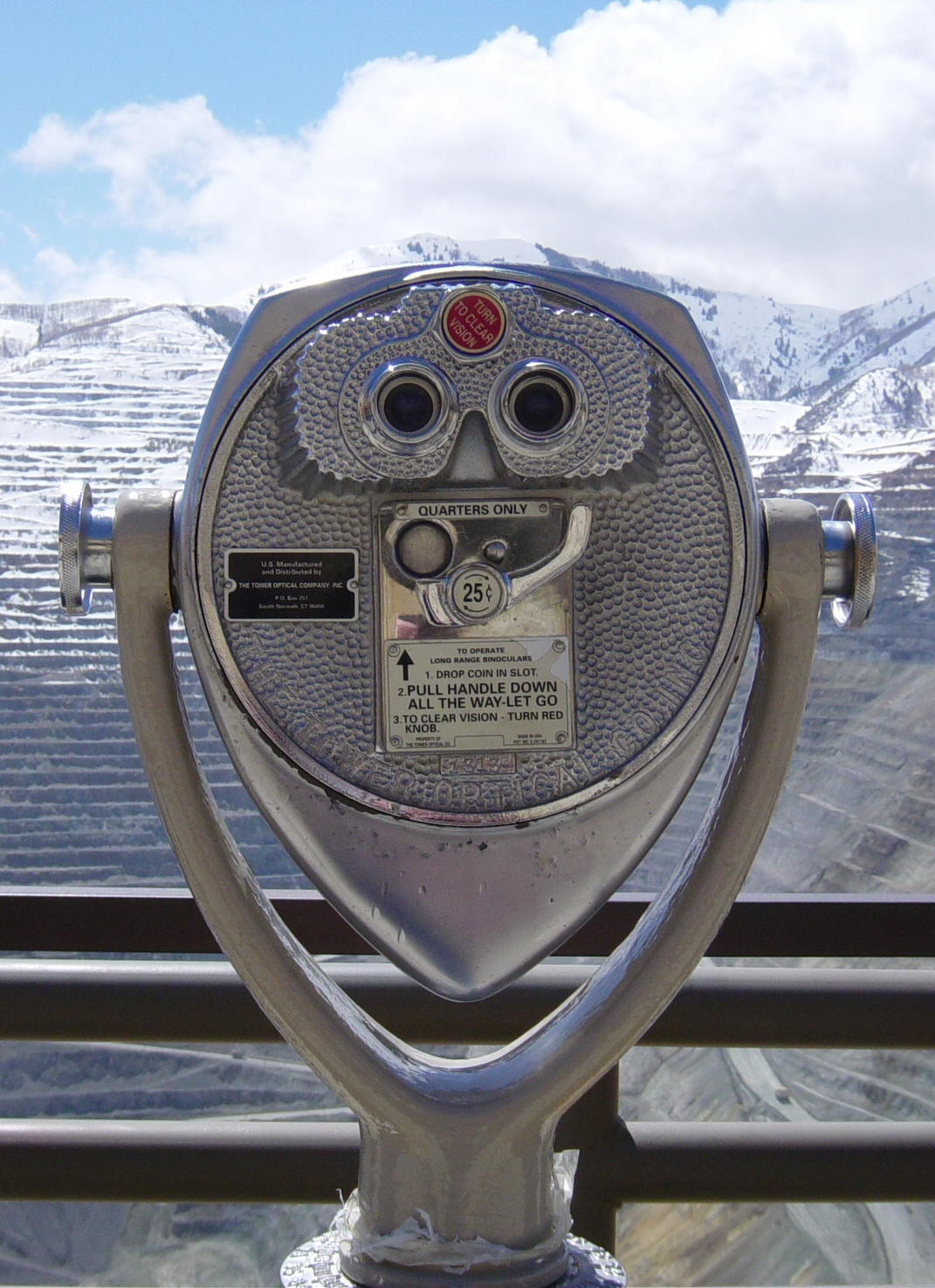
One of Tower Optical's coin-operated binoculars in Utah

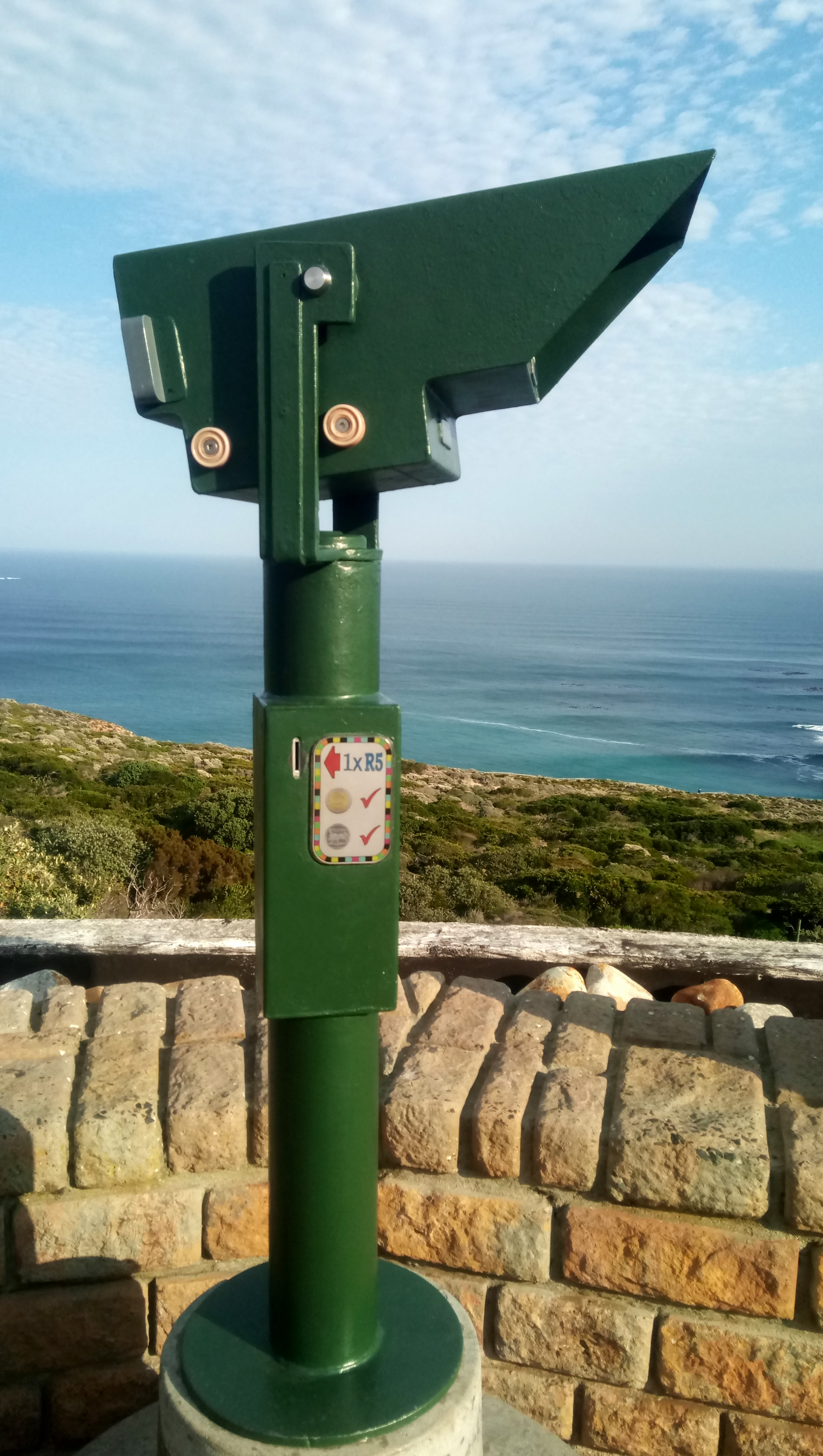
Coin-operated binocular at Cape of Good Hope

A tower viewer is a telescope or pair of binoculars permanently mounted on a stalk. The device magnifies objects through its lenses, allowing users to see further and more clearly than they could with the naked eye or with less powerful viewing devices. Tower viewers are typically metallic and most swivel horizontally and vertically (within given axes of rotation) to permit a range of view. The machines are commonly placed in tourist destinations and scenic lookouts for the purpose of viewing attractions and events of interest. They are also used in residential, business, recreational and government locations for the purposes of surveillance and safety monitoring.

== Alternative names ==
Tower viewers are known by a variety of names, including:

- coin(-operated) binoculars, coin(-operated) telescope, coin(-operated) scope, coin(-operated) viewer
- donation viewer
- free use viewer
- observation binoculars, observation telescope, observation viewer
- optical ranger, optical sight
- outdoor viewer
- non-coin(-operated) binoculars, non-coin(-operated) telescope, non-coin(-operated) scope, non-coin(-operated) viewer
- Pinnacle Scope
- revenue binoculars, revenue telescope
- scenic magnifier, scenic telescope, scenic viewer
- spyglass viewer, spyglasses
- stationary binoculars, stationary telescope
- tower binoculars, tower scope, tower telescope
- view master, viewfinder, viewer, viewing scope, viewing machine, viewing stand, viewing telescope

== Features ==
=== Viewing capabilities ===
- Directories: Some devices provide directories that guide users to easily target specific attractions within a tower viewer's field of vision.
- Focus, magnification, and power: Some devices focus automatically, while others permit users to manually adjust a viewer's focus and magnification to suit their individual needs. The range within such adjustments are limited by a device's magnification power.
- Height adjustment: Some machines allow users to adjust the height of the viewing device itself and/or its base.
- Range of motion: The latitude of motion varies among manufacturers and viewer models.

=== Audio capabilities ===
Some machines (such as Hi-Spy Viewing Machines, Inc.) are equipped with speakers that enable listeners to hear audio guides to the attractions within view. Additionally, listeners may select the language they wish to hear.

=== Paid versus free use ===
Tower viewers placed in public locations or used for fundraising purposes may be coin-operated or bill-acceptors; some others are free of charge. When payment is required to operate the machine, the viewing experience is specifically timed. In the case of coin-operated Tower Optical viewers, for example, paid viewing times are "roughly 1.5 to 2.5 minutes".

== Prevalence ==
Tower viewers are popularly used worldwide. For example, SeeCoast Manufacturing Company states: "SeeCoast's viewers can be found in every U.S. state and in over 80 overseas locations throughout the world."

== Manufacturers ==
Two well-known manufacturers of tower viewers in the United States are Tower Optical Co., Inc. (founded in 1933) and SeeCoast Manufacturing Company, Inc. (founded in 1960). Both firms offer wheelchair-accessible viewer bases that provide easy access to the sighting mechanisms in compliance with the Americans with Disabilities Act.

Tower viewer manufacturers located abroad include Hi-Spy Viewing Machines, Inc. (established in 1991) in Cobourg, Ontario, Canada.
