= Chad Hackenbracht =

American stock car racing driver

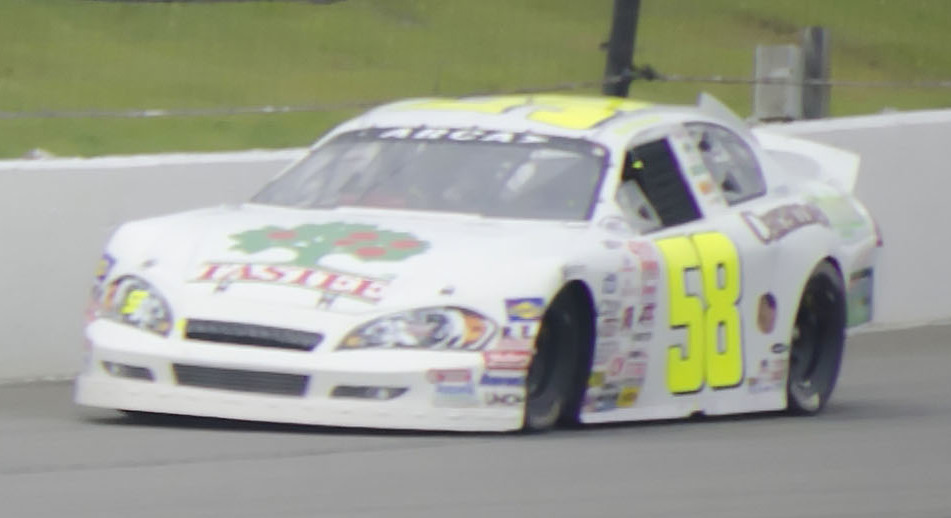
- Hackenbracht's No. 58 ARCA car at Pocono Raceway in 2011
- Born: November 7, 1991 (age 35); New Philadelphia, Ohio, U.S.

NASCAR O'Reilly Auto Parts Series career
- 7 races run over 1 year
- 2013 position: 118th
- Best finish: 118th (2013)
- First race: 2013 CNBC Prime's "The Profit" 200 (Loudon)
- Last race: 2013 ServiceMaster 200 (Phoenix)
Wins	Top tens	Poles
0	0	0

NASCAR FedEx Freight Truck Series career
- 4 races run over 1 year
- 2013 position: 36th
- Best finish: 36th (2013)
- First race: 2013 WinStar World Casino 400K (Texas)
- Last race: 2013 Smith's 350 (Las Vegas)
Wins	Top tens	Poles
0	1	0

NASCAR Canada Series career
- 1 race run over 1 year
- 2013 position: 50th
- Best finish: 50th (2013)
- First race: 2013 Pinty's Presents the Clarington 200 (Mosport)
Wins	Top tens	Poles
0	0	0

ARCA Menards Series career
- 47 races run over 3 years
- Best finish: 5th (2012)
- First race: 2010 Lucas Oil Slick Mist 200 (Daytona)
- Last race: 2012 Kansas Lottery 98.9 (Kansas)
- First win: 2012 Pennsylvania ARCA 125 (Pocono)
Wins	Top tens	Poles
1	22	2
- Statistics up to date as of November 16, 2013.

Chad Hackenbracht (born November 7, 1991) is an American former professional stock car racing driver.

== Career ==
Hackenbracht began his racing career in 2003, competing in Mid Western Quarter Midget Association races; in 2006 he moved to Legends car racing. He made his debut in the ARCA Racing Series in 2010 at Daytona International Speedway; he competed in 47 races in the series over the next three years, He nearly won at Chicagoland Speedway in 2011, leading the most laps in the race before blowing a tire while leading with fifteen laps remaining. In 2012, he scored his first win in the series at Pocono Raceway in August.

In 2013, Hackenbracht signed with TriStar Motorsports to drive the team's No. 44 Toyotas in seven Nationwide Series races that year; in June, he added four Camping World Truck Series races to his schedule, driving the No. 51 Toyota for Kyle Busch Motorsports. He also raced in the NASCAR Canadian Tire Series in September at Canadian Tire Motorsport Park.

Hackenbracht entered the 2014 racing season looking for a regular ride.

== Motorsports career results ==
=== NASCAR ===
(key) (Bold – Pole position awarded by qualifying time. Italics – Pole position earned by points standings or practice time. * – Most laps led.)

==== Nationwide Series ====
NASCAR Nationwide Series results
Year	Team	No.	Make	1	2	3	4	5	6	7	8	9	10	11	12	13	14	15	16	17	18	19	20	21	22	23	24	25	26	27	28	29	30	31	32	33	NNSC	Pts	Ref
2013	TriStar Motorsports	44	Toyota	DAY	PHO	LVS	BRI	CAL	TEX	RCH	TAL	DAR	CLT	DOV	IOW	MCH	ROA	KEN	DAY	NHA; 21	CHI; 22	IND	IOW	GLN	MOH; 30	BRI; 20	ATL	RCH	CHI; 21	KEN	DOV	KAN	CLT; 21	TEX	PHO; 24	HOM	118th	0^{1}	

==== Camping World Truck Series ====
NASCAR Camping World Truck Series results
Year	Team	No.	Make	1	2	3	4	5	6	7	8	9	10	11	12	13	14	15	16	17	18	19	20	21	22	NCWTC	Pts	Ref
2013	Kyle Busch Motorsports	51	Toyota	DAY	MAR	CAR	KAN	CLT	DOV	TEX; 26	KEN	IOW	ELD	POC; 15	MCH	BRI	MSP; 2	IOW	CHI	LVS; 17	TAL	MAR	TEX	PHO	HOM	36th	116	

==== Canadian Tire Series ====
NASCAR Canadian Tire Series results
Year	Team	No.	Make	1	2	3	4	5	6	7	8	9	10	11	12	Rank	Points	Ref
2013	Jacombs Racing	27	Dodge	MOS	DEL	MOS2	ICAR	MPS	SAS	ASE	CTR	RIS	MOS3; 13	BAR	KWA	50th	31	

^{*} Season still in progress
^{1} Ineligible for series points

=== ARCA Racing Series ===
(key) (Bold – Pole position awarded by qualifying time. Italics – Pole position earned by points standings or practice time. * – Most laps led.)

ARCA Racing Series results
Year	Team	No.	Make	1	2	3	4	5	6	7	8	9	10	11	12	13	14	15	16	17	18	19	20	ARSC	Pts	Ref
2010	CGH Motorsports	58	Chevy	DAY; 40	PBE	SLM	TEX; 26	TAL; 21	TOL	POC; 25	MCH; 20	IOW	MFD	POC; 13	BLN	NJM	ISF	CHI; 27	DSF	TOL	SLM	KAN; 25	CAR; 37	30th	900	
2011	CGH Motorsports	58	Chevy	DAY; 40	TAL; 17	SLM; 19	TOL; 11	NJE; 9	CHI; 20*	POC; 7	MCH; 4	WIN; 3	BLN; 5	IOW; 10	IRP; 16	POC; 7	ISF; 10	MAD; 23	DSF; 14	SLM; 17	KAN; 10	TOL; 8		8th	4145	
2012	CGH Motorsports	58	Chevy	DAY; 14	MOB; 2	SLM; 21	TAL; 3	TOL; 8	ELK; 7	POC; 2	MCH; 21	WIN; 8	**NJE**; 26	IOW; 6	CHI; 6	IRP; 25*	POC; 1	**BLN**; 10	ISF; 6	MAD; 3	SLM; 31	DSF; C	KAN; 24	5th	4310	
