= Easton Press =

American book publisher

- Parent company: MBI, Inc.
- Founded: 1975
- Country of origin: United States
- Headquarters location: Norwalk, Connecticut
- Publication types: Books
- Official website: www.eastonpress.com

Easton Press, a division of MBI, Inc., based in Norwalk, Connecticut, is a publisher specializing in premium leather-bound books. In addition to canonical classics, religion, poetry and art books, they publish a selection of science fiction and popular literature.

Some of Easton Press's products are arranged in monthly subscription series.

Because Easton Press purchased Heritage Press and Heritage Press published less expensive editions of books published by The Limited Editions Club, the interior printed content of all three is usually identical. Vintage Limited Editions Club books are in some cases valuable. Vintage Heritage Press offers same content at low prices. And Easton Press the identical contents but with premium quality paper, ribbon markers, high quality leatherbound exteriors and 22K gold exterior decorations.

== Style ==
The Easton Press uses a number of elements of older publishing and book-binding styles, including gilt edges, raised bands on the spine, and ribbon markers. It commissions illustrations for its editions, including from prominent illustrators like Arthur Szyk, David Gentleman and Chris Van Allsburg, who illustrated its editions of C.S. Lewis' Chronicles of Narnia.

== Book series ==
Over the years The Easton Press has published a number of book series including The Greatest Books Ever Written, Masterpieces of American Literature, The Library of American Presidents (also known as: The Library of the Presidents), The Library of American History, Roger Tory Peterson Field Guides, Library of Fly-Fishing Classics, Signed Modern Classics, Flyway of Life, and The Masterpieces of Science Fiction.

== See also ==
- List of companies based in Norwalk, Connecticut
- Danbury Mint, another MBI division
- Franklin Library
- Folio Society
