= Chuck Walker (racing driver) =

American racing driver

- Born: February 21, 1963 (age 63) Concord, North Carolina, U.S.

ARCA Menards Series career
- Debut season: 2003
- Current team: Young's Motorsports
- Car number: 02
- Engine: Chevrolet
- Crew chief: Andrew Abbott
- Starts: 2
- Championships: 0
- Wins: 0
- Poles: 0
- Statistics up to date as of March 26, 2022.

Chuck Walker (born February 21, 1963) is an American professional stock car racing driver. He competes part-time in the ARCA Menards Series, driving the No. 02 Chevrolet SS for Young's Motorsports.

== Racing career ==
=== ARCA Menards Series ===
Walker made his ARCA Menards Series debut in 2003 (then the ARCA Re/Max Series) at Daytona International Speedway, finishing 18th. He attempted to qualify for the following race at Atlanta Motor Speedway but was unsuccessful. He returned to the series in 2009 running at Pocono Raceway and the Michigan International Speedway. He finished 33rd at Pocono due to a battery issue and failed to start at Michigan. He attempted multiple races over the following years, but failed to make any other races.

== Motorsports career results ==
=== ARCA Menards Series ===
ARCA Menards Series results
Year	Team	No.	Make	1	2	3	4	5	6	7	8	9	10	11	12	13	14	15	16	17	18	19	20	21	22	AMSC	Pts	Ref
2003	SCORE Motorsports	02	Dodge	DAY; 18		NSH	SLM	TOL	KEN	CLT	BLN	KAN	MCH	LER	POC	POC	NSH	ISF	WIN	DSF	CHI	SLM	TAL	CLT	SBO	142nd	140	
2003	Bryan McClure Racing	02	Dodge		ATL; DNQ																					142nd	140	
2009	Bob Schacht Motorsports	75	Ford	DAY	SLM	CAR	TAL	KEN	TOL	POC; 33	MCH; 40	MFD	IOW	KEN	BLN	POC	ISF	CHI	TOL	DSF	NJE	SLM	KAN	CAR		145th	90	
2010	Bob Schacht Motorsports	75	Chevy	DAY; DNQ	PBE	SLM	TEX	TAL	TOL	POC	MCH	IOW	MFD	POC	BLN	NJE	ISF	CHI	DSF	TOL	SLM	KAN	CAR			145th	0	
2012	Bob Schacht Motorsports	75	Toyota	DAY; Wth	MOB	SLM	TAL	TOL	ELK	POC	MCH	WIN	NJE	IOW	CHI	IRP	POC	BLN	ISF	MAD	SLM	DSF	KAN			N/A	0	
2018	Kimmel Racing	08	Ford	DAY; Wth	NSH	SLM	TAL	TOL	CLT	POC	MCH	MAD	GTW	CHI	IOW	ELK	POC	ISF	BLN	DSF	SLM	IRP	KAN			N/A	0	
2022	Young's Motorsports	02	Chevy	DAY; Wth	PHO	TAL	KAN	CLT	IOW	BLN	ELK	MOH	POC	IRP	MCH	GLN	ISF	MLW	DSF	KAN	BRI	SLM	TOL			N/A	0	
