= Great Dane Trailers =

American manufacturer of trailers

Great Dane
- Formerly: Savannah Blow Pipe Co. (1900–1920); Steel Products Co. (1920–1958); Great Dane Trailers (1958–2011)
- Founded: 1900
- Headquarters: Chicago, Illinois, U.S.
- Key people: Dean Engelage (CEO)
- Products: Semi-trailers
- Website: greatdane.com

Great Dane, formerly known as Great Dane Trailers, is a manufacturer of dry van, refrigerated van and flatbed semi-trailers, in addition to dry freight and refrigerated truck bodies. Established in 1900 by J.P. Wheless and T.H. McMillan as the Savannah Blowpipe Company in Savannah, Georgia, the company currently has eleven manufacturing plants strategically located across the U.S., along with corporate offices in Savannah and Chicago and a robust dealer network. It is one of the world's largest manufacturers of commercial truck trailers.

== History ==
=== 1900s to 1930s ===
Great Dane was founded as the Savannah Blow Pipe Co. in Savannah, Georgia, in 1900, fabricating sheet metal systems to move sawdust and woodchips in saw mills and woodwork plants. By 1916, Great Dane manufactured diverse steel plate and structural steel products and systems. Changing its name to reflect that, it became the Steel Products Co. In 1920, the company moved to a 10,000 sq. ft. building on Lathrop Ave. It remained here for almost a century where its employees worked alongside a 10-ton traveling crane and power tools for cutting and punching to operate the steelwork and blacksmith facilities. During the Great Depression, which started in 1929 and continued into the 1930s, Roosevelt's New Deal called for highways to be modified and rebuilt, giving jobs to thousands of struggling Americans. This was an opportunity for the Steel Products Co. to grow by designing and manufacturing trailers for over-the-road freight hauling. To improve their road trailer, the company hired a team of experienced trailer builders. The trailers designed by the team were called Great Danes, after the dogs. The first trailers to be created were flatbeds but by 1934, both tank trailers and enclosed vans were added to the roster. At this point in history, every state had some form of regulation for the size and weight of trucks traveling on highways. Great Dane's solution was to use thin, strong high-tensile steel to make the trailers lighter.

=== 1940s to 1960s ===
During WWII, Great Dane was called upon to produce heavy-duty trailers. Throughout the war, America had been growing its own fruits and vegetables at home to be able to conserve and send more food to the soldiers overseas. After the war, demand for fresh fruits and vegetables was high. This led to the year 1947, which saw the first of many refrigerated trailers, more commonly known as reefers. Originally created as a cooled produce van, the trailer used a wet ice bunker and a gas engine blower system. It was quickly followed by Great Dane's official line of Sno-Zone Reefers. The 1950s saw change for the company. When Eisenhower signed the National Interstate and Defense Highways Act in 1956, the federal government began regulating truck size and weight. Once the Interstate Highway System was established, Great Dane was challenged to build longer and bigger trailers, while continuously making them lighter. The company responded with the aluminum van trailer and tandem axle, which was utilized across the nation. By the mid-50s, the company had sales outlets throughout the Eastern United States, located in 31 cities in 18 states. In 1958, the company officially changed its title from the Steel Products Co. to Great Dane Trailers, Inc. The original signature dog oval was black, but officially rebranded to red to commemorate the changing of the name. The 1960s were full of alternate transportation opportunities. By 1961, Great Dane joined the railroad industry, manufacturing its first piggyback trailer for easier transportation of goods. It also completed its first order of maritime containers in 1963 for the American shipping industry.

=== 1970s to 1990s ===
In 1972, Great Dane purchased an all-platform trailer manufacturing location in Memphis, Tennessee, from Arrow Trailer. In 1974, Great Dane grew even further by building a manufacturing plant in Brazil, Indiana, that originally focused solely on vans and the western/mid-western business spheres. In the present day, the plant is focused on specialty work as well as reefers and dry freight vans. Brazil is still Great Dane's largest manufacturing facility. That year also marked the completion of the 10,000 square foot Savannah Engineering Research Lab built for testing of design and construction, which allowed the facility to double production. The idea of expansion and improvement became the new motto to inspire the company to make changes. In 1982, Great Dane installed computer-controlled road simulation equipment that the Research and Development Lab in Savannah, Georgia, still uses today. It is the only one of its kind still in operation. In 1988, Great Dane acquired the SuperSeal reefer production line and plant in Wayne, Nebraska. This addition created the broadest line for reefers in the entire industry. Great Dane officially expanded internationally during the 1980s. In 1996, Great Dane opened a dry van plant in Terre Haute, Indiana, as well as an adjacent parts distribution center. The merger the next year of Great Dane and Pines Trailer created the Great Dane Limited Partnership, making it one of the world's largest trailer companies. By 1999, Great Dane completely updated its branch locations with the expansion of the Little Rock, Arkansas, sales office to a full-service branch.

=== 2000s to Present ===
In 2002, Great Dane purchased Strick's Eastern Van manufacturing facilities in Danville, Pennsylvania, and the Trailmobile manufacturing facilities in Jonesboro, Arkansas. By 2004, Great Dane had acquired a production facility in Huntsville, Tennessee, from Wabash National Corporation and went into production one year later. The Memphis, Tennessee, plant closed in 2005. In 2006, Great Dane reached a major milestone. Over the course of the year, Great Dane was able to produce 60,000 trailers across nine different plants. In January 2009, Great Dane closed its original manufacturing plant in Savannah, Georgia, that had been open since 1919 due to the economic hit the company took during the recession. In 2010, Great Dane made changes to its complete product line and century-old brand. A new reefer plant was opened in Statesboro, Georgia, to expand manufacturing. Great Dane also acquired Johnson Refrigerated Truck Bodies. A change in leadership was made in 2011 as president and COO Phil Pines retired from the company after more than 50 years of service in the trailer industry. He was replaced by Dean Engelage. In 2011, the name of the company was officially changed from “Great Dane Trailers” to simply “Great Dane”. By 2016, Great Dane had introduced two new truck body designs: The Alpine and The Sahara. Great Dane grew even further in 2016 with the opening of a new plant in Elysburg, Pennsylvania, for dry van manufacturing. In 2026, the company unveiled a new all-aluminum flatbed, Freedom Ultra.

== Products ==
Trailer production began for Great Dane in the 1930s. Great Dane's significant manufacturing and product improvements have impacted the motor carrier industry. In 1931, the Savannah Blowpipe Company decided to design and manufacture truck trailers for over-the-road freight hauling. The first Great Dane trailers built by Steel Products Company were 16- to 20-foot-long flatbed trailers, with single axles and payload capacities of three to six tons. Great Dane entered the piggyback and container market, completing its first piggyback trailer order in 1961 and its first maritime container order in 1963. The Steel Products Company produced about 12,000 trailers on government contracts during World War II. In 1980, Great Dane installed computer-controlled Road Simulation Equipment in the Research and Development facility located at the Savannah, Georgia, plant. This was followed closely by the use of Finite Element Analysis software, key in achieving desired strength-to-weight designs. During 1979, Great Dane installed Space Age Simulation Equipment in the Research and Development Lab. Great Dane's engineering capability was greatly enhanced by the installation of CADCAM Computer Graphics. Robotics was introduced into the Memphis plant for welding operations to which plasma arch cutting would eventually be added. In 1985, the first FRP panels were produced at the Composite Panel facility in Brazil.

=== Refrigerated ===
The Steel Products Company pioneered the refrigerated trailer field. SuperSeal reefers created the broadest line of reefers in the industry, and early refrigerated trailers made long-distance shipping of fruits and vegetables possible. By 1953, refrigerated aluminum trailers were in demand for use in the Florida perishables market and became the standard for the eastern United States. The first insulated and cooled trailer dates back to the early 1940s, when the company built the first produce van that was equipped with a wet ice bunker powered by a gas engine-and-blower system. The first reefer trailers were all steel in the 1940s, around the end of the war. The early 1950s saw further advancements and new trends. Great Dane's new “oval-nose” reefer was streamlined for airflow, but this design was eventually discontinued due to the shape and placement of reefer units. Also popular was the “underslung” reefer unit, which was located in the belly of the trailer. In the late 1950s, Great Dane was continuing to explore new reefer innovations. For example, a dry ice reefer was introduced, although they were very unusual and were only built for about a year. While the trailer sold well, dry ice was rare and hard to find. The 1950s was the decade of reefers. In the late 1950s, Great Dane introduced the Dual Temp reefer which allowed frozen food to be held in the rear and produce in the front. Also in the 1950s, Great Dane introduced the early nose mount Thermo King Reefer units. Insulation for trailers during the time period consisted of block Styrofoam, just like that used in coolers, which was hand-fitted and lined with plywood.

=== Dry Freight ===
By 1934, the Great Dane line also included tank trailers and an enclosed trailer van. In 1938, the Steel Products Company responded to the new opportunity that came from economic pressure and the advent of highway weight laws aimed at haulers by creating lightweight tank trailers and van trailers made of high-tensile steel. A stressed skin van of exceptionally lightweight design became the principle Great Dane product. Production of straight frame, aluminum and FRP dry freight vans began at the Brazil facility in mid-1974, increasing the refrigerated van capacity of the Savannah plant. In 2002, Great Dane demonstrated huge strides in engineering and technology when the SSL dry freight van was added to the product line. The SSL's patented design offers steel-lined interior walls. Of Great Dane's dry freight sales in 2006, more than 20,000 trailers were SSL models, accounting for nearly 15 percent of the industry's total shipments in 2006.

=== Flatbed ===
Great Dane offers three models of flatbed trailers: The all-steel Freedom SE; the steel-aluminum combo Freedom LT; and the all-aluminum Freedom XP.

=== Truck Bodies ===
Great Dane offers three lines of truck bodies: The Sahara dry freight truck body series, the Alpine refrigerated truck body and the Johnson Series line of composite refrigerated truck bodies. There are two models of Sahara truck bodies: The composite plate Sahara C-Series and the sheet-and-post Sahara S-Series. The Johnson Series line consists of three refrigerated composite truck bodies: The Johnson C-Series, the Johnson R-Series and the Johnson S-Series.

== Locations ==
=== Corporate ===
Great Dane is headquartered in Chicago, Illinois, with an additional corporate office in Savannah, Georgia.

=== Plants ===
Great Dane produces its products at manufacturing plants located in Jonesboro, Arkansas; Statesboro, Georgia; Kewanee, Illinois; Brazil, Indiana; Terre Haute, Indiana; Wayne, Nebraska; Danville, Pennsylvania; Elysburg, Pennsylvania; Huntsville, Tennessee; and Rice Lake, Wisconsin.

=== Branches ===
Great Dane branches are located in the following cities: Atlanta, Georgia; Birmingham, Alabama; Bolingbrook, Illinois; Charlotte, North Carolina; Dallas, Texas; Columbus, Ohio; Houston, Texas; Indianapolis, Indiana; Jacksonville, Florida; Knoxville, Tennessee; Little Rock, Arkansas; Memphis, Tennessee; Miami, Florida; Mount Joy, Pennsylvania; Nashville, Tennessee; Philadelphia, Pennsylvania; Richmond, Virginia; Springdale, Arkansas; and Tampa, Florida.

=== Dealers ===
Great Dane products and parts are sold at certified Great Dane dealerships across the United States, Canada, Chile, Colombia, Mexico, and Peru.
