= Matt Lofton =

American racing driver

- Born: February 1, 1985 (age 41); Roxboro, North Carolina, U.S.

NASCAR FedEx Freight Truck Series career
- 3 races run over 2 years
- Best finish: 75th (2011)
- First race: 2010 Kroger 200 (Martinsville)
- Last race: 2011 Kroger 200 (Martinsville)
Wins	Top tens	Poles
0	0	0

Matt Lofton (born February 1, 1985) is an American former professional stock car racing driver. He has raced in the NASCAR Camping World Truck Series and the ARCA Racing Series.

== Motorsports career results ==
=== NASCAR ===
(key) (Bold – Pole position awarded by qualifying time. Italics – Pole position earned by points standings or practice time. * – Most laps led.)

==== Camping World Truck Series ====
NASCAR Camping World Truck Series results
Year	Team	No.	Make	1	2	3	4	5	6	7	8	9	10	11	12	13	14	15	16	17	18	19	20	21	22	23	24	25	NCWTC	Pts	Ref
2010	Matt Lofton Motorsports	97	Toyota	DAY	ATL	MAR	NSH	KAN	DOV	CLT	TEX	MCH	IOW	GTW	IRP	POC	NSH	DAR	BRI	CHI	KEN	NHA	LVS	MAR; 31	TAL	TEX	PHO	HOM	124th	-	
2011	Matt Lofton Motorsports	97	Toyota	DAY	PHO	DAR	MAR; 23	NSH	DOV	CLT	KAN	TEX	KEN	IOW	NSH	IRP	POC	MCH	BRI	ATL	CHI	NHA	KEN	LVS	TAL	MAR; 31	TEX	HOM	75th	13	

=== ARCA Racing Series ===
(key) (Bold – Pole position awarded by qualifying time. Italics – Pole position earned by points standings or practice time. * – Most laps led.)

ARCA Racing Series results
Year	Team	No.	Make	1	2	3	4	5	6	7	8	9	10	11	12	13	14	15	16	17	18	19	20	ARSC	Pts	Ref
2010	Matt Lofton Motorsports	97	Chevy	DAY; DNQ	PBE	SLM	TEX	TAL	TOL	POC	MCH	IOW	MFD	POC	BLN	NJE	ISF	CHI	DSF	TOL	SLM	KAN; 13	CAR	89th	190	
2011	Matt Lofton Motorsports	97	Chevy	DAY; DNQ	TAL	SLM	TOL	NJE	CHI; 18	POC	MCH; 31	WIN	BLN											45th	550	
2011	Coulter Motorsports	16	Chevy											IOW; 24	IRP	POC	ISF	MAD	DSF	SLM	KAN; 6	TOL		45th	550	
2012	Coulter Motorsports	16	Chevy	DAY; 34	MOB; 16	SLM; 14	**TAL**; 2*	TOL; 11	ELK; 2	POC; 4	MCH; 3	WIN; 5	NJE; 25	IOW; 7	CHI; 16	IRP; 11	POC; 7	BLN; 8	ISF; 14	MAD; 11	SLM; 10	DSF; C	KAN; 38	6th	4220	
