= Daily Voice (American hyperlocal news) =

Journalism company based in Norwalk, Connecticut

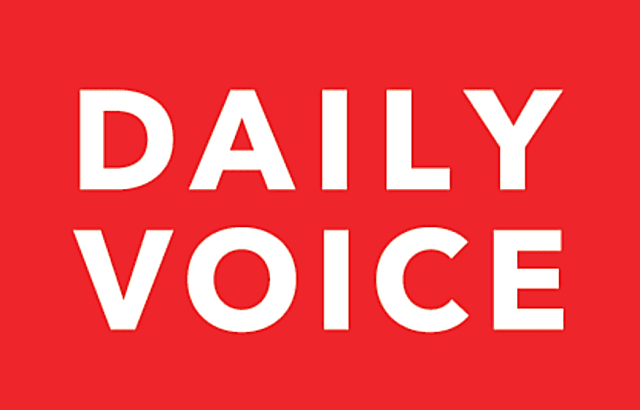
- Company type: Private
- Website type: Local news
- Headquarters: Norwalk, Connecticut, {{{location_country}}}
- Area served: Fairfield County, Connecticut; Westchester County, New York; Rockland County, New York; Putnam County, New York; Dutchess County, New York; Sullivan County, New York; Orange County, New York; Ulster County, New York; Passaic County, New Jersey; Bergen County, New Jersey
- Founders: Carll Tucker, Chair
- Key people: Carll Tucker, CEO; Zohar Yardeni, CEO; Travis Hardman, COO; Ted Yang
- Services: Online community news
- Employees: 44 (mid-2010); 100 (mid-2012)
- Website: dailyvoice.com
- Launched: 2010
- Current status: Active

Daily Voice, formerly Main Street Connect, is an American community journalism company that says it "bridge[s] the 'news desert' between national and hyper-local, covering town, city, county, and state". It is based in Norwalk, Connecticut, and it operates town-based news websites in various places in New Jersey, New York, and in Fairfield County, Connecticut.

== Founding and initial history ==
The company's former logo

The company was founded in 2010 by Carll Tucker, a veteran of the community news business with Trader Publications (sold to Gannett Company in 1999), who described his new approach as a hybrid of The New York Times and Facebook. The company raised almost $4 million in its first round of private equity funding, an amount which made news in the journalism industry. The company's editorial director was financial commentator and author Jane Bryant Quinn, who is also a member of its board of directors. Others associated with the company included Peter Georgescu, Chairman Emeritus of the marketing and communications company Young & Rubicam, and John Falcone, former executive with mobile advertising company SmartReply.

Main Street Connect first appeared as town-centric news sites in Fairfield County, Connecticut, named "The Daily [Town]", such as the first one, The Daily Norwalk for Norwalk, Connecticut. Ten such sites were in operation by the end of 2010, and Main Street Connect had 44 full-time employees as of mid-2010.

The franchising structure of Main Street Connect was explicitly likened to that of the McDonald's fast food chain. It was intended to work via a local group hiring journalists to cover a community, with the national entity supplying a framework for website technical hosting and support, working capital, and guidance related to fundamental business strategies. There was to be no start-up fee, and Main Street Connect would get 17 percent of a site's revenue. The eventual goal was to provide an attractive platform for national brands to advertise on, and support higher advertising rates than local websites can typically charge - one that put it closer to the level that once supported local print newspapers. The company's target for 2013 was to have 3,000 sites operating with some 10,000–15,000 journalists involved; existing community newspapers were not seen as potential franchisees.

Main Street Connect's start coincided with a renewed interest in local advertising among national companies. It competed most prominently with another national-local combination, AOL's Patch.com, but took a slower approach than Patch in rolling out new sites. It also competed with news aggregators such as Topix, event aggregators such as Eventful, and content creation sites such as Examiner.com and Yahoo's Associated Content.

== Subsequent developments ==
In February 2011, Main Street Connect announced that the one million mark in visits to their websites had been passed, and subsequently said that the sites get about 110,000 unique visitors per month against an underlying population of some 420,000 people. By March 2011, the franchising model was restructured by Tucker, who instead referred to opening "pods" of about ten sites each. The company said it would launch three pods totaling 31 sites in Westchester County, New York, on June 1. In May 2011, Main Street Connect acquired CentralMassNews, which owned ten local news sites in Central Massachusetts. On June 1, 2011, the company rolled out 32 (one more than expected) sites in Westchester.

In October 2011, Tucker was succeeded as CEO by Zohar Yardeni, formerly of Thomson Reuters, and experienced with financial and information start-ups. Tucker stayed on as chair of the company. Main Street Connect also obtained $7 million in second round funding at this time. Total sites in October 2011 numbered 52.

In May 2012, the company rebranded itself to become Daily Voice. Aside from the new name and logo, there were no other changes to business operations. The new name was purchased by Main Street Connect, and, therefore, was no longer affiliated with Keith Boykin or Malcolm J. Harris, the figures behind the 2008-begun The Daily Voice onsite news site for African Americans.

In March 2013, Yardeni suddenly resigned. The company underwent a major downsizing, closing all 11 of its Massachusetts sites and laying off those employees.

During 2018, the Daily Voice operation was taken over by Cantata Media, based in Norwalk, Connecticut. In 2019 Cantata Media formed an alliance with Westfair Communications, the publisher of the Fairfield County Business Journal, to form a subscription-based website, Daily Voice Plus, that would feature material from both organizations.

== See also ==
- List of companies based in Norwalk, Connecticut
