= North American Power =

American retail energy supplier

- Trade name: North American Power
- Industry: Retail electricity and natural gas supplier
- Founder: Kerry Breitbart; Carey Turnbull
- Headquarters: Norwalk, Connecticut, United States
- Key people: Deryl Brown (CEO)
- Revenue: $250–500 Million
- Number of employees: 70+
- Website: napower.com

North American Power is a retail energy supplier based in Norwalk, Connecticut.

The company provides electricity and natural gas to residential and commercial customers in 12 deregulated states: Connecticut, Georgia, Illinois, Maine, Maryland, New Hampshire, New Jersey, New York, Ohio, Pennsylvania, Rhode Island, and Texas.

== Business model ==
North American Power formerly used a multi-level marketing model to sell utilities, In January 2015, the company announced that it would be terminating the network marketing division of its company.

In January 2011, the Maryland Public Service Commission (MPSC) began an investigation of the company for misleading sales practices. On 9 June 2011, the company was fined $100,000 by the MPSC. On 16 August 2013, the commission closed the file after finding that the company had completed the required remedial measures it had agreed to. In a statement, founder Kerry Breitbart attributed the problems to rapid growth, and stated that the company was improved by its re-examined practices.

The company also sold Renewable Energy Certificates (RECs) through their American Wind program. A 2014 report by environmental watchdog group EcoRI said that the company did not specify if these certificates were from the older class of RECs, or from the substantially more expensive and efficient newer class. North American Power said that the RECs were certified by ISO New England, although that organization said they do not certify RECs.
