= List of Connecticut companies =

The following list of Connecticut companies includes notable companies that are, or once were, headquartered in Connecticut.

== Companies based in Connecticut ==
=== A ===
- Aetna
- Affinion Group
- Aircastle
- Amphenol
- AQR Capital
- ATMI

=== B ===
- Barden Corporation
- Bevin Brothers Manufacturing Company
- Bigelow Tea Company
- BlueTriton Brands
- Bob's Discount Furniture
- Boehringer Ingelheim USA
- Branson Ultrasonics
- Breitling USA
- Bridgewater Associates
- Bristol Technology

=== C ===
- Cadenza Innovation
- Cannondale Bicycle Corporation
- Charter Arms
- Charter Communications
- Cigna
- Cogent Fibre
- Colt Defense
- Colt's Manufacturing Company
- Conair Corporation
- Crane Co.

=== D ===
- Datto
- Diageo
- Digital Currency Group
- Dooney & Bourke
- Duracell

=== E ===
- Eastern Mountain Sports
- Emcor
- ESL Investments
- ESPN
- Ethan Allen
- Eversource Energy

=== F ===
- FactSet
- Fairfield County Bank
- Farrel Corporation
- Fire-Lite Alarms
- First County Bank
- Foxwoods Resort Casino
- Frontier Communications
- Frontier Communications of Connecticut
- FuelCell Energy

=== G ===
- Gartner
- GE Capital
- General Dynamics Electric Boat
- Gerber Scientific
- Gramercy Funds Management
- Guideposts

=== H ===
- H/2 Capital Partners
- The Hartford
- Hartford Courant
- Henkel North American Consumer Goods
- High Precision
- Hitachi Capital America Corp.
- Hosmer Mountain Soda

=== I ===
- IMS Health
- Interactive Brokers
- IQVIA
- ITT Inc.

=== J ===
- J.H. Whitney & Company

=== K ===
- Kayak.com
- Knights of Columbus

=== L ===
- Lego USA
- Liberty Bank
- Lone Pine Capital
- LoveSac

=== M ===
- Media Storm
- Metropolitan District of Connecticut

=== N ===
- Nestlé Waters North America
- New Britain Dry Cleaning Corporation
- Newman's Own
- Newtown Savings Bank
- North Sails
- North Street Capital, LP

=== O ===
- Otis Elevator Company

=== P ===
- People's United Financial
- Pepperidge Farm
- Philip Morris International
- Photronics Inc
- Pirate Capital
- Pitney Bowes
- Playtex
- Point72 Asset Management
- Pratt & Whitney
- Praxair
- Priceline.com
- Primacy
- Purdue Pharma

=== R ===
- Reliant Air
- Rhone Apparel

=== S ===
- S.A.C. Capital Advisors
- Saffron Road
- Savings Bank of Danbury
- Sikorsky Aircraft
- Silver Point Capital
- SNET America
- Spectrum
- Sperry Rail Service
- Stanley Black & Decker
- Stew Leonard's
- Sturm, Ruger & Co.
- Subway
- Synchrony Financial

=== T ===
- Taunton Press
- Ted's Restaurant
- Terex
- Tetley USA Inc.
- Timex Group USA
- Tower Optical
- Trufresh

=== U ===
- UBS
- Union Savings Bank
- United Rentals
- United States Rubber Company
- United Technologies
- Urstadt Biddle Properties

=== V ===
- Ventus
- Vertrue
- Victorinox North America
- Viking Global Investors
- Vineyard Vines
- Virtus Investment Partners

=== W ===
- W. R. Berkley Corporation
- Webster Bank
- Western Connecticut Health Network
- WorldQuant
- WWE

=== X ===
- Xerox
- XPO, Inc.

== Companies formerly based in Connecticut ==
=== 0-9 ===
- 454 Life Sciences

=== A ===
- A. C. Gilbert Company
- Ansonia Clock Company
- Applera
- Arrowhead Water

=== B ===
- Bear Naked, Inc.
- Blue Sky Studios
- Bon Ami
- Borden
- Bridgeport Machines, Inc.
- Brooks Brothers

=== C ===
- Caldor
- Carrier Corporation
- Cervalis
- Chemtura
- Clairol
- Coleco
- Connecticut Company
- Connecticut Land Company
- Connecticut Railway and Lighting Company
- Crabtree & Evelyn

=== D ===
- The Daily Voice

=== E ===
- Edible Arrangements

=== F ===
- Fairfield Greenwich Group
- Frisbie Pie Company
- FrontPoint Partners

=== G ===
- G. Fox & Co.
- General Electric

=== H ===
- Hamilton Sundstrand
- Harney & Sons
- Hartford Whalers

=== I ===
- International Paper
- Ives Manufacturing Company

=== J ===
- JWM Partners

=== L ===
- Long-Term Capital Management

=== M ===
- Marlin Firearms
- Meriden Firearms Co.
- MicroWarehouse

=== N ===
- New York, New Haven and Hartford Railroad
- NewAlliance Bank

=== P ===
- Pequot Capital Management
- PerkinElmer
- Peter Paul Candy Manufacturing Company
- Plainfield Asset Management
- Pope Manufacturing Company
- Praxair
- Price Rite

=== R ===
- Remington Arms
- Russell Trust Association

=== S ===
- Schick
- Sharps Rifle Manufacturing Company
- Southern Air
- Swisher International Group

=== T ===
- Time Warner Cable
- Tobin Arms
- Towers Perrin
- The Travelers Companies

=== U ===
- U.S. Smokeless Tobacco Company
- United Natural Foods
- UPS

=== W ===
- Weekly Reader
- Winchester Repeating Arms Company

== See also ==
- List of companies of the United States by state
