= List of breweries in Colorado =

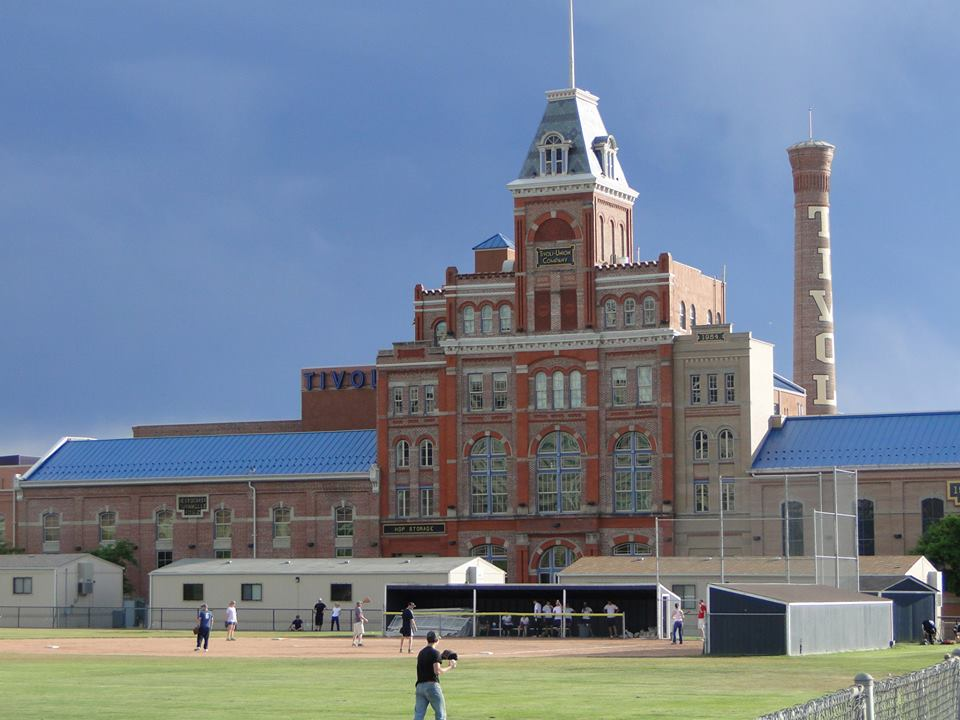
The Tivoli Brewery was built in 1882 and is now the student union of the Metropolitan State University of Denver.

Breweries in the U.S. state of Colorado produce a wide range of beers in different styles that are marketed locally, regionally, nationally, and internationally. In 2012, Colorado's 161 breweries and brewpubs and three wholesalers employed 5,000 people directly, and more than 22,000 others in related jobs such as wholesaling and retailing. Including people directly employed in brewing, as well as those who supply Colorado's breweries with everything from ingredients to machinery, the total business and personal tax revenue generated by Colorado's breweries and related industries was more than $2.5 billion. Consumer purchases of Colorado's brewery products generated another $118 million in tax revenue. In 2012, according to the Brewers Association, Colorado ranked 3rd in the number of craft breweries, and 6th per capita, with 154.

According to the Beer Institute, the state ranked number one in terms of gross beer production, producing over 23,370,848 barrels in 2006. Colorado is home to 4 of the top-50 brewing companies in the nation.

For context, at the end of 2013 there were 2,822 breweries in the United States, including 2,768 craft breweries subdivided into 1,237 brewpubs, 1,412 microbreweries and 119 regional craft breweries. In that same year, according to the Beer Institute, the brewing industry employed around 43,000 Americans in brewing and distribution and had a combined economic impact of more than $246 billion.

== Breweries ==
In 2012, Colorado ranked 5th nationally in craft breweries per capita.

- 3 Freaks Brewery – Highlands Ranch
- 300 Suns – Longmont
- Adolph Coors Company – Golden; the largest single brewery in the world, producing up to 22 million barrels of beer each year
- Anheuser-Busch InBev – Ft. Collins
- Asher Brewing Company – Boulder
- Avery Brewing Company – Boulder
- Beyond The Mountain Brewing- Boulder
- Black Bottle Brewery – Fort Collins
- Bootstrap Brewing Company – Longmont
- Boulder Beer Company – Boulder
- Breckenridge Brewery – Littleton; acquired by Anheuser-Busch in 2015
- Brewability – Englewood
- Call to Arms Brewing Company, Denver
- Camber Brewing Company – Fraser
- Cannonball Creek Brewing Company – Golden
- Chain Reaction Brewing Co.
- Collision Brewing Company – Longmont
- Declaration Brewing Company – Denver
- DeSteeg Brewing, Denver
- Dillon Dam Brewery – Dillon
- Dry Dock Brewing Co. – Aurora
- Eddyline Brewery, Salida
- Elk Mountain Brewing Company – Parker
- Flyeco Craft Brewing – Denver
- Fort Collins Brewery – Fort Collins
- Front Range Brewing Co. – Lafayette
- Great Divide Brewing Company – Denver
- Grossen Bart Brewery – Longmont
- Hogshead Brewery – Denver
- Kokopelli Beer Company – Westminster
- Left Hand Brewing Company – Longmont
- Little Machine Beer, Denver
- Living the Dream Brewing – Littleton – taproom, opened in 2014
- Locavore Beer Works – Littleton – taproom, opened in 2014
- Mad Jack's Mountain Brewery – Bailey taproom, opened in 2016
- Mountain Toad Brewing – Golden
- New Belgium Brewing – Fort Collins; the first wind-powered brewery in the U.S. and is currently the largest of its kind in the world
- Oasis Brewing Company, Denver
- Odell Brewing Company – Fort Collins
- Oskar Blues Brewery – Lyons and Longmont
- Paonia United Brewing Company – Paonia
- Paradox Beer Company – Divide
- The Post Brewing Company – Lafayette
- Rails End Beer Company – Broomfield
- Seestock Brewery, Denver
- SKA Brewing – Durango
- Snowbank Brewing – Fort Collins
- South Park Brewing, Fairplay
- Three Barrel Brewing Co, Del Norte
- Tommyknocker Brewery – Idaho Springs
- Upslope Brewing Company – Boulder
- Walnut Brewery – Boulder
- WestFax Brewing Company, Denver
- Wibby Brewing – Longmont
- Wiley Roots Brewing Company – Greeley
- Wonderland Brewing – Broomfield
- Wynkoop Brewing Company – Denver

== Closed breweries ==
- AC Golden Brewing Company – Golden
- Fort Collins Brewery – Fort Collins
- Revolution Brewing – Paonia
- Walter Brewing Company – Pueblo, Trinidad

== Pop culture ==
In Dumb and Dumber, Lloyd refers to Aspen, Colorado as "a place where the beer flows like wine".

Denver has been nicknamed "the Napa valley of beer," but it is unclear how this nickname came to be. Referenced by the Denver Business Journal, it's rumored that the nickname was created by the Sheraton Hotel chain as part of their "Chief Beer Officer" promotion in 2008.

According to legend, Denver's first permanent structure was a saloon. While there is evidence of a saloon and brothel at 2009 Market Street of historical significance, it seems likely that the true location of the first permanent structure is forever unknown. According to The City and The Saloon, Denver 1858-1916, there were numerous saloons in the Denver area during the city's early days.

== See also ==
- Beer in the United States
- List of breweries in the United States
- List of microbreweries
- Bibliography of Colorado
- Geography of Colorado
- History of Colorado
- Index of Colorado-related articles
- List of Colorado-related lists
- Outline of Colorado
