= FCB =

FCB may refer to:

== Banks ==
- Fairfield County Bank, in the United States
- Farm Credit Bank, part of the Farm Credit System in the United States
- Florida Community Bank, in the United States
- First Community Bank, in Kenya
- First Consolidated Bank, in the Philippines

== Football clubs ==
- FC Baník Ostrava, Czech Republic
- FC Barcelona, Spain
  - FC Barcelona Femení, women's section of the above
- FC Basel, Switzerland
- FC Bayern Munich, Germany
  - FC Bayern Munich (women), women's section of the above
- FC Bendigo, Australia
- 1. FC Bocholt, Germany
- Club Brugge KV, Belgium
- FK Budućnost Podgorica, Montenegro
- FC Büsingen, Germany

== Other uses ==
- Fangchengbao, a Chinese automotive brand and subsidiary of BYD Auto
- FCB (advertising agency), an American advertising agency (Foote, Cone & Belding)
- Fired clay brick
- FCB group in the classification of bacteria
- File Control Block
- Fluocortin butyl, a synthetic glucocorticoid
- Forms Control Buffer in a printer
- Fort Collins Brewery, an American brewery
- Frozen carbonated beverage
- Farsi Contemporary Bible
- Functional Cargo Block, a component of the Soviet TKS spacecraft
