= Primacy =

Primacy may refer to:

- an office of the Primate (bishop)
- the supremacy of one bishop or archbishop over others, most notably:
  - Primacy of Peter, ecclesiological doctrine on the primacy of Peter the Apostle
  - Primacy of the Roman Pontiff, ecclesiological doctrine on the primacy of the Roman See
  - Primacy of the Five Sees, ecclesiological doctrine on the primacy of the five major patriarchates (pentarchy)
  - Primacy of Jerusalem in Christianity, ecclesiological doctrine on the primacy of the See of Jerusalem
  - Primacy of Canterbury, the supremacy of the Archbishop of Canterbury over the Archbishop of York
- Primacy of Jerusalem in Judaism, religious primacy of the Holy City of Jerusalem in Judaism
- Aramaic primacy, a scholarly theory in the Christian Bible studies
- Primacy of the House of Commons, a political system based on the primacy of the House of Commons over the House of Lords
- Primacy of European Union law, a legal concept in the international law
- Primacy effect, a concept in psychology and sociology
- Primacy (company), a digital marketing agency based in Connecticut, USA
- Primacy, a suburb of Bangor, County Down

== See also ==
- Primate (disambiguation)
- Primacy of Jerusalem (disambiguation)
