= Bjorn Rebney =

American mixed martial arts executive

- Born: California, U.S.
- Known for: Bellator Founder and CEO
- Spouse: Huma Gruaz
- Children: 2

Bjorn Rebney is an American businessman who served as chairman and chief executive officer of Bellator MMA from 2008 until June 2014.

== Background ==
Rebney attended Ohio University on a football scholarship and then attended law school. Rebney did legal work in construction-defect then moved to the sports-law firm Steinberg Moorad & Dunn. In 2001, Rebney formed a partnership with Sugar Ray Leonard. The company was Sugar Ray Leonard Boxing Inc. The two had a falling out and the business dissolved.

== Bellator MMA ==
Rebney's passion for mixed martial arts made him decide to start an MMA promotion. In his search for investors to fund his idea of a promotion, Rebney had sixty-one investor meetings within 16 months. To fund these trips to meet with investors and fighters, Rebney spent his savings and took out a second and third mortgage on his home. In Rebney's 62nd meeting with investors, he met executives at Plainfield Asset Management, who were familiar with the sport from prior meetings with management of EliteXC and the International Fight League who looked for capital to stay in business. Among the investors were Tim Danaher, who was the company's vice president at the time. After a follow-up meeting in New York, Plainfield agreed to provide the capital, which led to the creation of Bellator Fighting Championships.

In October 2011, television and media conglomerate Viacom (now Paramount Global) purchased majority ownership of Bellator. Despite the company no longer being under Rebney's ownership, he remained Bellator Chairman and CEO until June 18, 2014, when Rebney's immediate exit from the company was announced by Viacom. In addition to Rebney, Tim Danaher left his position as president and COO. Rebney was replaced by former Strikeforce president and CEO Scott Coker. Viacom executive, Kevin Kay, later explained that the reason for Rebney's separation from the company was that Rebney was committed to keeping Bellator a tournament-based promotion, while Kay felt a seasonal tournament format would have limited the growth of the organization.

== MMAAA ==
In November 2016, it was announced that Rebney was chosen as an advisor to the Mixed Martial Arts Athletes Association (MMAAA). Among the members of the former organization were Georges St. Pierre, Cain Velasquez, T.J. Dillashaw, Tim Kennedy, and Donald Cerrone.

== Personal life ==
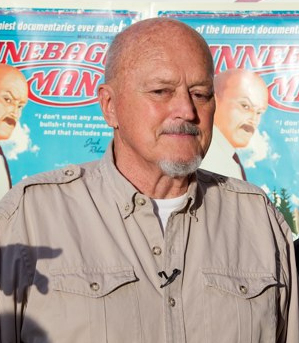
Rebney's father Jack in 2010

Rebney's father was Jack Rebney, an unintended viral video star and later subject of the 2009 documentary Winnebago Man. Jack Rebney died in May 2023 at the age of 93.

Rebney is married to Huma Gruaz, an advertising and public relations executive. The couple has two children.
