= FCBS =

FCBS may refer to:

- Fairfax County Board of Supervisors, in Virginia, United States
- Fulham College Boys' School, in London
- Sibiti Airport, in the Republic of the Congo

== See also ==
- FCB (disambiguation)
