= Ted's Restaurant =

Hamburger restaurant in Meriden, Connecticut, USA

Coordinates: 41.5468°N 72.7832°W

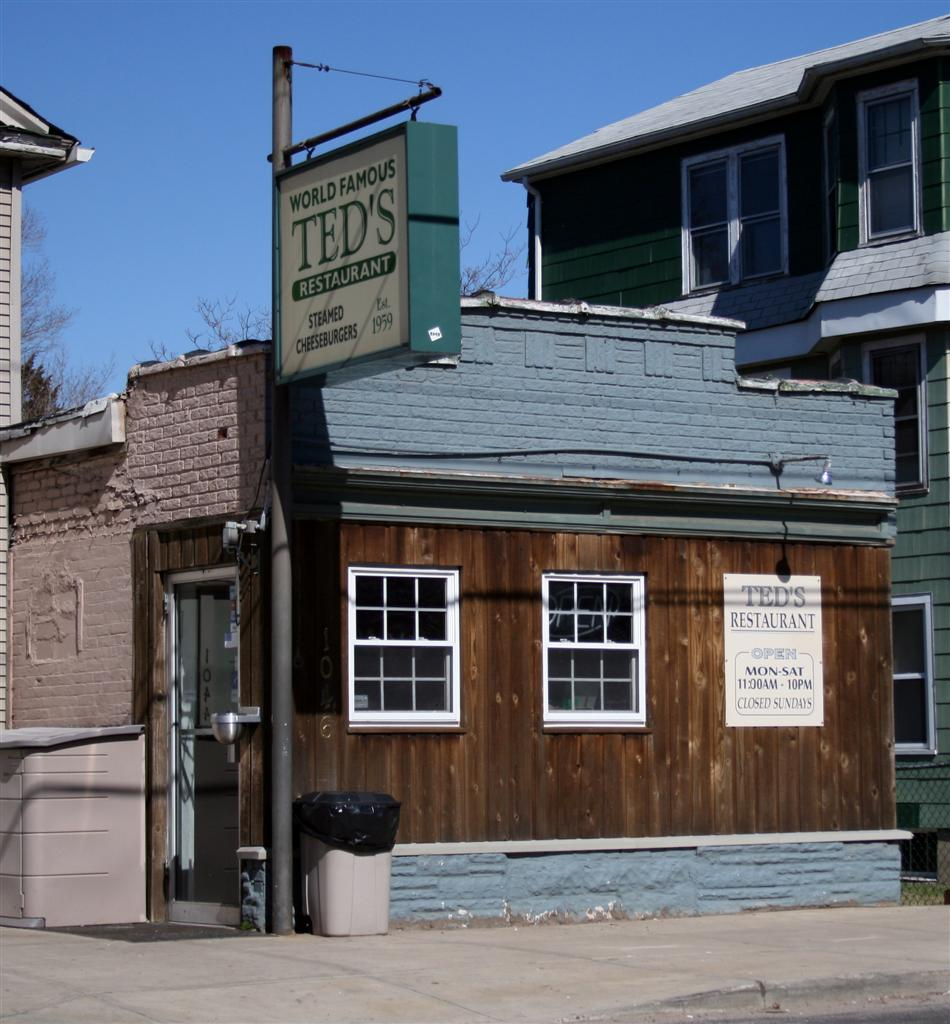
Ted's Restaurant in Meriden, Connecticut

Ted's Restaurant is a hamburger restaurant established in 1959 that is known for its steamed cheeseburger. Its original location is in Meriden, Connecticut, in the United States. It also operates a food truck and a concession stand.

== Early years ==
The steamed cheeseburger, also referred to as a "steamer" or "cheeseburg", is believed to have been invented at a restaurant called "Jack's Lunch" in Middletown, Connecticut, in the 1930s. However like many restaurant food icons the origin is somewhat unclear, but despite this it is undisputed that Ted Duberek opened his namesake restaurant serving the steamed burgers in 1959 in Meriden, catering to the then significant local factory worker population. Early on, as the local factories were working around the clock, Ted's would stay open until 4:00 A.M.

== Steamed cheeseburger preparation ==
Instead of being fried in a pan or grilled on a grill like typical cheeseburgers, the steamed cheeseburgers at Ted's Restaurant are cooked via steaming in a stainless-steel cabinet which contains small trays that hold either an individual hamburger patty or a chunk of cheese. This method of cooking causes the fats in the meat to melt away and they are then drained from the tray once the patty is fully cooked. The end result is a moist, juicy burger which is then served by scooping the meat onto a bun and then pouring the melted cheese over the meat. The burger comes with a choice of customary toppings.

== Changes in ownership ==
Over the years the local factories began moving their manufacturing overseas, yet Ted's remained in business, though with shorter hours. After Ted Duberek died in the early 1970s, his son Paul Duberek took over, running the business until 2007. That year, Paul sold the business to his nephew Bill Foreman, who had worked at Ted's while he attended high school and college. Bill has continued running the business with few changes and the steamed cheeseburger remains the featured menu item.

== Expansion attempt ==
Ted's expanded in the 2010s with the addition of two more restaurant locations in Cromwell, Connecticut and North Haven, Connecticut but by 2018 they had both been closed.

== In the media ==
Ted's was featured on a second-season episode of the Travel Channel's Man v. Food in December 2009. Then in June 2013 it was featured on another Travel Channel show, Burger Land.

== "Steam Machine" food truck ==
Ted's operates a food truck named the "Steam Machine" and it sells steamed cheeseburgers at Bushnell Park in downtown Hartford, Connecticut, at the Xfinity Theatre amphitheatre also in Hartford, and at UConn Huskies football games at Pratt & Whitney Stadium at Rentschler Field in East Hartford, Connecticut.

== PeoplesBank Arena concession stand ==
Ted's sells steamed cheeseburgers at a concession stand located behind section 101 in the PeoplesBank Arena arena in Hartford, Connecticut.

== Hartford Yard Goats promotion ==
In August 2018 Ted's was the featured food vendor during a special promotion by the Hartford Yard Goats minor league baseball team. For one home game the Yard Goats changed their name to the "Hartford Steamed Cheeseburgers" and wore special one-off uniforms resembling the food item. Ted's sold made-to-order steamed cheeseburgers to fans at the "Hartford Neighborhood Flavors Cart" that was set up at the stadium.

== See also ==
- List of Connecticut companies
- List of hamburger restaurants
- 22 Short Films About Springfield
