= Upslope Brewing Company =

- Company type: Privately held company
- Industry: Brewery, Beer
- Founded: 2008
- Founder: Matt Cutter, Danny Pages
- Headquarters: Boulder, Colorado, United States
- Number of locations: 2
- Area served: Colorado
- Production output: 30,433 bbls (2016)
- Revenue: $2.1 million (2012)
- Number of employees: 55
- Website: upslopebrewing.com

Upslope Brewing Company is a brewery company in Boulder, Colorado founded in 2008. The company operates two breweries, both in Boulder, and produces several types of beer.

== Overview ==
The company was founded in 2008 in Boulder, Colorado by Matt Cutter and Dany Pages. Shortly afterward, Henry Wood joined the team. In 2012, the company's revenue was $2.1 million. The company operates two breweries, their original brewery in north Boulder and a newer one in east Boulder established in April 2013. Both locations also have a taproom.

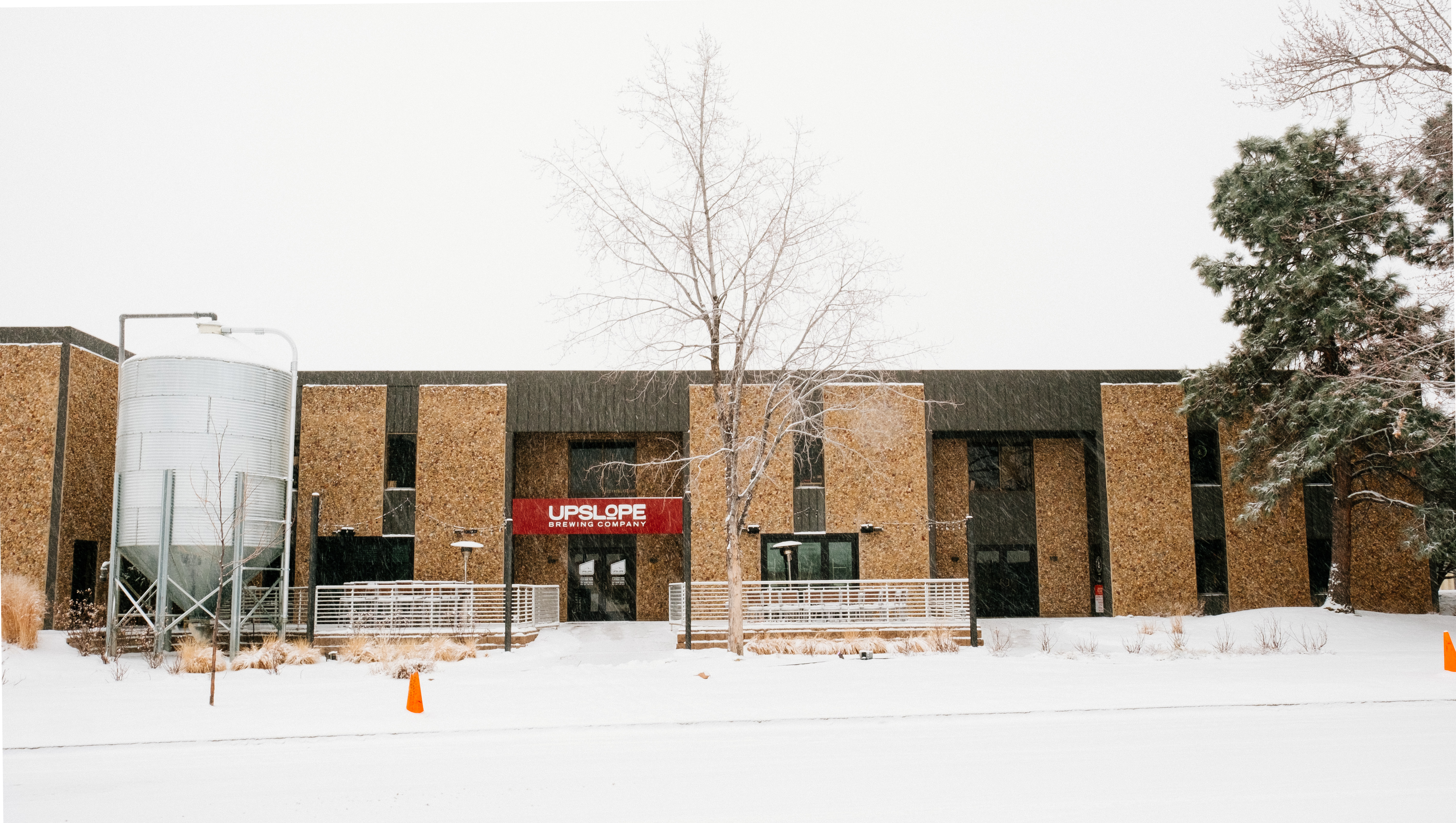
Flatiron Park

The Brewers Association trade group ranked Upslope's 2016 production of 30,433 barrels as the 8th highest in Colorado. Production significantly increased when the company opened their second brewery in east Boulder. The company packages its beers solely in aluminum cans.

Up to April 2013, the company only distributed its products in Colorado. In July 2013, distribution expanded to include Texas, and as of 2018 the company's products are distributed to seven states.

== Beers ==
Upslope Brewing Company brews Citra pale ale, India Pale Ale, brown ale, lager, Oatmeal stout and Imperial IPA styles of beer. The company also produces a limited release pumpkin ale brewed with fresh pumpkins, a limited release Belgian pale ale and a Christmas ale.

== Awards ==
In the 2013 Great American Beer Festival Pro-Am Competition, Upslope Brewing Company won a bronze medal for their oatmeal stout. In 2013 the company was ranked No. 5 in a list of fastest-growing Boulder companies published by Boulder County Business Report.

== See also ==
- List of breweries in Colorado
