= Primacy of Jerusalem =

Primacy of Jerusalem may refer to:

- Primacy of Jerusalem in Judaism, religious and cultural primacy of the Holy City of Jerusalem, in Judaism
- Primacy of Jerusalem in Christianity, ecclesiological doctrine on the primacy of the Holy See of Jerusalem

== See also ==
- Primacy (disambiguation)
- Religious significance of Jerusalem
