= Christina Lampe-Önnerud =

Swedish chemist

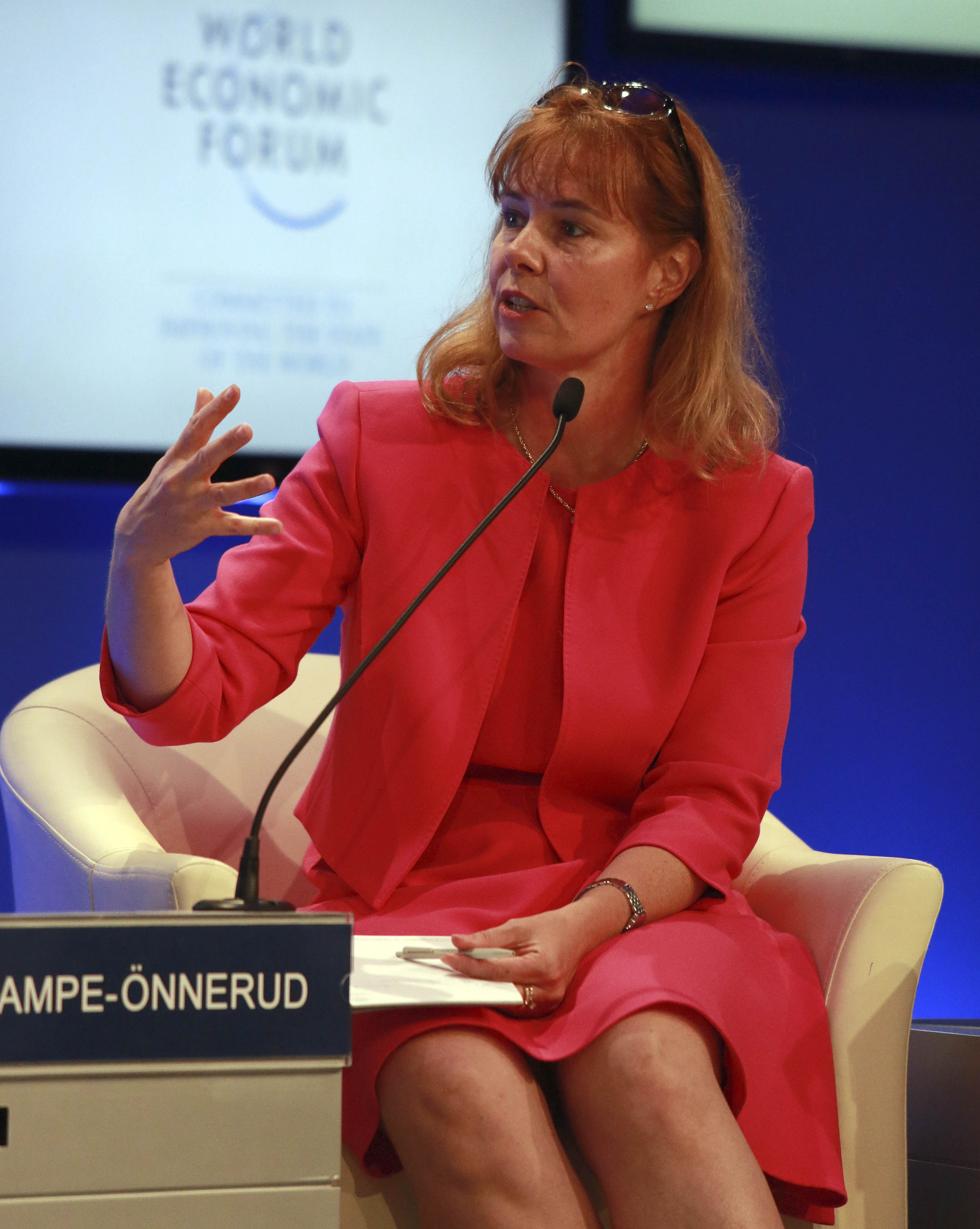
- Born: 4 February 1967; Sweden
- Education: B.S.Uppsala University, M.S., PhDUppsala University
- Spouse: Per Önnerud
- Awards: 17 patents (2018); Swedish Woman of the Year(2011); Elected member of the Royal Swedish Academy of Engineering Sciences (2010); Technology Pioneer Award (2010)
- Scientific career
- Fields: Inorganic Chemistry, Power Generation
- Workplaces: Cadenza Innovation

External videos
- “Power Dynamic: Christina Lampe-Önnerud at TEDxKTH”, 2012, TED Talks
- “Innovate46 2015: Special Dialogue – Battery Technology “, Peter Carlsson (Tesla) & Christina Lampe-Önnerud, 2015

Maria Christina Lampe-Önnerud (born 4 February 1967) is a Swedish inorganic chemist, battery-inventor, and entrepreneur. She has founded the companies Boston-Power Inc. (2005–2012) and Cadenza Innovation (initially called CloTeam, 2012). She is developing batteries for use in computers, electric vehicles, and grid storage. She has received a number of awards, including the World Economic Forum's Technology Pioneer Award in 2010 and again in 2018, and is an elected member of the Royal Swedish Academy of Engineering Sciences. Lampe-Önnerud has many interests, including opera singing, jazz dancing, playing the cello, and choir directing.

== Early life ==
Christina Lampe-Önnerud was born in Sweden. Her father, Wolfgang Lampe, was a power engineer. Lampe-Önnerud had an interest in science early on, making fireworks in a basement bathtub and playing with chemistry and electrical kits as a child. She was also trained as an opera singer.

== Education ==
Lampe-Önnerud considered careers in opera singing and medicine and was offered a scholarship for an 8-year program for a medical doctorate degree but turned it down her senior year of high school. After high school, Lampe-Önnerud accepted a Fulbright scholarship to attend Elmira College in New York. At Elmira College she studied English literature, business, and the sciences while working in a chemistry laboratory as a lab assistant.

With encouragement from her father to pursue a career in a STEM field and her growing interest in the sciences, Lampe-Önnerud returned to Sweden and obtained a BSc in Chemistry and a PhD in inorganic chemistry from Uppsala University in Sweden. In her master's program at Uppsala, Lampe-Önnerud studied copper deposition on semiconductor wafers, and for her PhD she focused on analyzing cathode materials for lithium-polymer batteries while working with a Denmark battery producer, Danionics, who later patented some of the materials Lampe- Önnerud studied.

Lampe-Önnerud then held a postdoctoral appointment at MIT in Cambridge, MA working for Quantum Energy Technologies. This was sponsored by the American Chemical Society.

== Personal life ==
Lampe-Önnerud is married to Per Önnerud, who she met in high school. She has two children, Anna-Maria and Mattias.

From 2002 until 2020, she served as the Director and Chairman of the non-profit Stardust Show Chorus and is currently the director of Silk'n'Sounds, an auditioned chorus of women based in the Greater New Haven area bound together by their love of singing. They strive to be an organization that values and celebrates diversity among its members, empowering women to rise to their highest level of musicality through singing and performing.

== Career ==
Lampe-Önnerud has focused her career on energy storage since her time at Uppsala University, where her father had an interest in power generation. While still a doctoral student, Lampe-Önnerud patented a material to increase the power of lithium batteries. She joined Bell Communications Research in New Jersey in 1995, as a director and senior scientist, working on prototypes for thin-film polymer lithium batteries. She later became one of the youngest partners at Arthur D. Little (whose research section was acquired by TIAX), in charge of the company's battery labs.

She founded the lithium-ion battery company Boston-Power Inc. in 2005 and owned the company until 2012 working as the CEO, executive chairman, and international chairman. The company focused on lithium-ion batteries for small personal computing devices.

From 2007 to 2009, Lampe-Önnerud was assigned by Club de Madrid and the United Nations to serve asan energy expert for the Road to Copenhagen initiative and in 2008, she was a member of the United States' State Department's delegation to China, hosted by the Ministry of Commerce, PRC, and Chinese Academies of Science.

In 2009, Lampe-Önnerud was a member of the European Union's Presidential delegation to China and Premier Wen Jiabao, dealing with subjects such as clean technology deployment, CSR, and international trade. Additionally, starting in 2009, Lampe-Önnerud was elected Co-Chairman of the Global Future Council on Energy at the World Economic Forum. She serves on multiple working groups and as a speaker at the WEF on topics ranging from global innovation to renewable transport and finance. She is active in multiple forums throughout the United States, China, and the EU.

In 2010, she became a Lifetime Member of the Swedish Royal Academy of Engineering Sciences.

Lampe-Önnerud served on the Ernst & Young Entrepreneur of the Year Advisory Board from 2010 through 2013, the Wall Street Journal Economist Advisory Council from 2011 through 2013, and the United Nations Inter Academy Panel (IAP) and Inter Academy Council from 2011 through 2014.

From 2011 through 2013, Lampe-Önnerud served as the Director of the New England Clean Energy Council.

In 2012, she and her husband Per Önnerud started the company CloTeam, later renamed Cadenza Innovation, based in Oxford, Connecticut. Her work aims at developing efficient, safe, lasting, and inexpensive batteries for various technologies, including computers, phones, and cars. The lithium-ion battery she invented is the first to be considered environmentally friendly while capable of providing long-lasting energy safely to various types of technology. She describes Cadenza's 2016 battery design, which involves a ceramic insert in an aluminum container, as "an energy LEGO-brick for engineers". It is intended to be a power source for electric vehicles such as Tesla's cars, but could also be used in electrical grids. Lampe-Önnerud continues to serve as the Founder, chief executive officer, and Director at Cadenza.

Lampe-Önnerud became a Lifetime Ambassador of Honor in Dalarna, Sweden in 2013. In 2013–2014, Lampe-Önnerud served as the Senior Manager and Management Committee Advisor in the Core Management Group at Bridgewater Associates in Westport, Connecticut. She worked closely with the CEO and Management Committee members during an extensive transition at this hedge fund, focusing on change in management centering around talent, cost, and efficiency.

From 2016 through 2019, Lampe-Önnerud served as the non-executive director of Syrah Resources Limited, an Australian-based company focusing on minerals and technology for industrial use. Lampe-Önnerud has served as a voice for power and energy issues at government and industrial conferences for over 15 years. Also starting in 2016, Lampe-Önnerud became a board member at the MIT Corporation Visiting Committee for the Department of Chemistry. Since 2016, she has also been a part of the NY-BEST (New York Battery and Energy Storage Technology) Consortium, appointed as Energy Storage Industry Director.

In 2018–2019, she held a board of directors appointment at FuelCell Energy and additionally joined the Future Battery Industry Collaborative Research Center advisory board and served from 2019-2022.

In 2019, Lampe-Önnerud was appointed to the Livent board of directors and has continued to serve on the Board through the 2023 Merger with Allkem to become Arcadium Lithium. Additionally, Christina Lampe-Önnerud has served as a director of ON Semiconductor Corporation since September 2023.

In April 2022, Lampe-Önnerud received one of Sweden's most prestigious awards – the King's Medal. She was honored for her outstanding contribution to Swedish business.

Christina Lampe-Önnerud holds 80+ patents on designs, products, devices, components, materials, and processes. She has over 25 technical publications in scientific journals focusing on science and thought-leadership. She has also enjoyed over 30 interviews, on media such as TV, radio, and podcasts with select features on CNBC, WGBH, NECN, and NPR. Lampe-Önnerud is featured in 500+ articles with select features in the Wall Street Journal, Bloomberg News, Fortune, Nikkei, and China Daily. She has given over 100 keynote presentations with select events such as the World Economic Forum, TED, and CES. Lampe-Önnerud has served as a voice for power and energy issues at government and industrial conferences for over 15 years.

== Published works ==
- "Conference Paper: Opportunities in energy storage due to the paradigm shift fueled by the mobile and clean tech revolutions" (2010)
- "A Consumer Revolution" (2009)
- "Benchmark study on high performing carbon anode material" (July 2001)
- "Conference Paper: Safety studies of Li-ion key components by ARC" (Feb. 2001)
- "Conference Paper: Safety studies on lithium-ion batteries by accelerating rate calorimetry" (Feb. 1999)
- Uppsala University Dissertation
  "Chemical and Electrochemical Intercalation of Lithium Into a V6O13 Host" (1995)

== Honors and awards ==
- 2022 Royal Honorary Gold Medal (Sweden)
- 2021, Holds 80+ patents
- 2021, Women of Technology Award, Connected World magazine
- 2018, Technology Pioneer Award, World Economic Forum
- 2018, INC. Top 100 Female Founders
- 2018, Frost & Sullivan North American Lithium-Ion Industrial and Electric Vehicle Battery Technology Innovation Award
- 2015, CT Technology Council 2015 Women of Innovation: Entrepreneurial Innovation and Leadership Award
- 2013, Elected Lifetime Ambassador of Honor, Dalarna, Sweden
- 2011, Important Women in Mobile Tech
- 2011, Swedish woman of the year ('Årets svenska kvinna'), Swedish Women's Educational Association.
- 2010, Elected Lifetime Member of the Royal Swedish Academy of Engineering Sciences ('Kungliga ingenjörsvetenskapsakademien')
- 2010, Private Company CEO of the Year from the MassTLC Leadership Awards
- 2010, Technology Pioneer Award, World Economic Forum
- 2010, Sustainable Leadership Award, Swedish Association of Environmental Managers
- 2009, Entrepreneur Hall of Fame
- 2009, Ernst & Young Entrepreneur of the Year for Clean Tech, New England region
- 2008, Stevie Award for Women in Business as Best Entrepreneur
- 2008, Top Innovators of 2008, EDN Magazine
- 2007, Mass High Tech Women to Watch
- 2007, DEMOgod™
- 2006, Top 100 Woman-Led Businesses in MA
- 2002, 100 Top Young Innovators, MIT's Technology Review
- 1998, Bell Labs Spot Innovation Award
- 1994, Amelia Earhart International Fellowship
- 1989, Nobel Foundation Student Award

== Popular culture ==
Christina Lampe-Önnerud presented an episode of the Sveriges Radio show Sommar i P1 on 25 June 2012.
