= Saffron Road =

American food brand

Saffron Road Food
- Company type: Private
- Industry: Food production and distribution
- Headquarters: Stamford, Connecticut
- Areas served: United States
- Key people: Adnan Durrani (founder)
- Number of employees: 28
- Parent: American Halal Company
- Website: saffronroad.com

Saffron Road is an American food brand. It is a subsidiary of American Halal Company, Inc. Saffron Road manufactures clean-label frozen foods, meal pouches, simmer sauces, family sized meals, and healthy snacks that are halal certified, all of which are made with ingredients from global cuisines. Saffron Road products are sold through 25,000 retail locations across the nation such as Whole Foods Market, Kroger, Safeway Inc., Giant Food Stores, Publix, Sprouts Farmers Market and H-E-B and Walmart, where it is the top natural protein-based entree.

== History ==
In 2009, Adnan Durrani founded American Halal Company in Stamford, Connecticut. The American Halal company sells halal certified food products under the brand Saffron Road Foods. The name "Saffron Road" was inspired by Yo-Yo Ma's Silk Road project. In July 2010, Saffron Road was launched through Whole Foods. Its products are halal certified, antibiotic free, gluten free, and non-gmo project verified. Some products, like their simmer sauces, are also vegan. Ingredients come from family owned, sustainable farms. In August 2015, American Halal acquired Mediterranean Snack Foods, a lentil snack food manufacturer, which was added to the Saffron Road line.

By 2014, Saffron Road produced fifty different products. Product lines include frozen entrees, appetizers and desserts, chicken nuggets and tenders, skillet sauces and broths, and snacks such as Crunchy Chickpeas, BeanStalks and ChickBean Crisps. Before Saffron Road, CEO Adnan Durrani was a principal equity partner and director at Stonyfield Farm (now Groupe Danone) and founder of Vermont Pure Spring water.

=== Recognition ===
Saffron Road was ranked number 642 on the Inc. 5000 list in 2015, number 703 in 2016, and 4800 in 2019. It ranked third in natural frozen food sales in the United States by 2014.
