= CyrusOne =

Data center operator

Coordinates: 32°59′32.27″N 96°55′49.44″W

CyrusOne, Inc.
- Type: Private
- Founded: July 2000; 26 years ago
- Founder: David Ferdman; Larry Bursten
- Headquarters: Dallas, Texas
- Key people: Alex Shumate (chairman); Eric Schwartz (CEO and president); Owen Morris (CFO)
- Products: Data centers
- Owner: Funds managed by Kohlberg Kravis Roberts and Global Infrastructure Partners
- Website: cyrusone.com

CyrusOne, Inc. owns and operates over 40 carrier-neutral data centers in North America, Europe, and Asia, where it provides colocation and peering services. It is headquartered in Dallas, Texas and is owned by funds managed by Kohlberg Kravis Roberts and Global Infrastructure Partners.

== History ==
B-roll of Wikimedia Foundation servers at CyrusOne in Carrollton, Texas

The company was formed in July 2000 by David Ferdman and Larry Bursten, who met when companies they founded were acquired by IXC Communications.

In July 2007, the company was acquired by ABRY Partners.

In June 2010, the company was acquired by Cincinnati Bell for $525 million.

In September 2011, the company acquired 55.9 acres in Chandler, Arizona for construction of a data center facility.

In 2012, CyrusOne opened the largest data center in Texas in Carrollton.

In January 2013, the company became a public company via an initial public offering.

By 2015, Cincinnati Bell had sold almost its entire stake in the company.

In July 2015, the company acquired Cervalis for approximately $400 million.

In March 2016, the company acquired a data center of CME Group in Aurora, Illinois for $130 million in a leaseback transaction. In December 2016, the company broke ground on a 425,000 square foot data center on the property.

In June 2016, the company purchased a 40-acre parcel in Loudoun County, Virginia.

In August 2017, the company acquired Zenium Data Centers, a provider with data centers in London and Frankfurt, for $442 million.

In December 2019, the company suffered from a REvil ransomware attack that affected six of its customers.

In February 2020, Tesh Durvasula was appointed president and chief executive officer of the company.

In July 2021, David Ferdman, the co-founder and former CEO, was appointed interim president and chief executive officer of the company.

In March 2022, the company sold its assets in Houston for $670 million.

Also in March 2022, the company was acquired by Kohlberg Kravis Roberts and Global Infrastructure Partners for $15 billion.

In August 2026, the company suffered from a ShinyHunters Ransomware attack, affecting employee data, customer contracts and documents related to organization's data center infrastructure operations.
