= Oskar Blues Brewery =

American beverage manufacturer

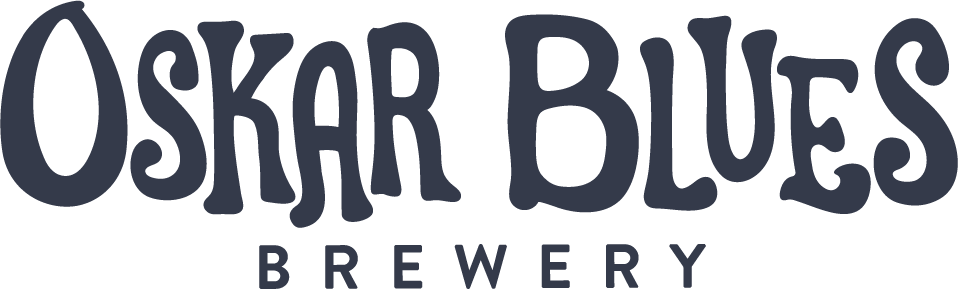
- Location: Longmont, Colorado
- Opened: 1997
- Owner: Monster Beverage
- Website: www.oskarblues.com

Active beers
Name	Type
Dale's Pale Ale	American Pale Ale
Dale's Light Lager	Light Lager
Dale's Double IPA	Double IPA
Mama's Little Yella Pils	Pilsner
Hazy Blues	Juicy IPA
Old Chub	Scotch Ale
Ten FIDY	Imperial Stout
Barrel-Aged Ten FIDY	Barrel-Aged Beer

Oskar Blues Brewery is a beverage manufacturer with locations in Longmont, Colorado and Brevard, North Carolina. The company began as a brewpub in Lyons, Colorado in 1997 and began brewing beer in the basement in 1999. In 2002, they became one of the first to put their own craft beer in cans. In 2012, they began marketing some of their craft beer in resealable aluminum containers, and in 2012, they expanded and established another brewery in Brevard, North Carolina.

== History ==
Oskar Blues Original Grill & Brew Restaurant was founded by Dale Katechis in Lyons, Colorado in 1997. Two years later, he began brewing beer in the basement of the restaurant.

Some credit Oskar Blues as the creator of the "first released canned craft beer in the United States" with the release of their Dale's Pale Ale in November 2002. Other writers point to an earlier beer, Chief Oshkosh Red Lager which was brewed and canned at an existing brewery, as the "first canned craft beer" on June 17, 1991, although its producer, the Mid-Coast Brewing company, closed in 1994. Four other companies produced canned craft beers prior to Oskar Blues, although the canning was done by larger companies under contract. Regardless of the first, by 2011 about 50 U.S. craft brewers were issuing craft beer in cans. In 2009, Oskar Blues Brewery sponsored an event called "Burning Can" which brought together other craft brewers who were using cans for their beers.

In 2012 Oskar Blues Brewery began using resealable aluminum containers for craft beer. Advertising Age named them one of the hottest brands of the year in 2010; Inc. magazine put them on the list of fastest-growing companies and they were featured on the cover of Market Watch magazine.

They are the largest beverage manufacturer (by volume) in the U.S. to abstain from using glass bottles. In 2011, they produced and canned 59,000 barrels of beer. In 2013, they employed over 275 people and distributed to 32 states. The company was ranked Colorado's second largest craft brewery and the 27th largest in the U.S. in 2012. and predicted they would brew 141,000 barrels of beer in 2013. The Colorado facility grew to 35,000 square feet (3,300 m^{2}) by 2013.

In 2013, they opened a satellite brewery in Brevard, North Carolina, with an initial production of 40,000 barrels which is capable of being scaled to 85,000.

Forty-five thousand barrels of beer were brewed at the Brevard brewery in 2013, the first full year of production, and the company plans to increase that to 120,000. The Longmont factory is available for tours, and features the Oskar Blues Tasty Weasel Taproom overlooking the brewery.

In 2016, Oskar Blues opened a brewery and taproom in Austin, Texas. The Austin facility abruptly closed in 2023.

The original Oskar Blues Grill and Brew is still located in Lyons, with 45 beers on tap.

In December 2018, Oskar Blues announced the launch of the "first national craft hard seltzer" named Wild Basin Boozy Sparkling Water.

== Beers ==
- Dale's Pale Ale was Oskar Blues' first beer. It is somewhere between an American pale ale and an India Pale Ale brewed with European malts and American hops. In 2005, Dale's Pale Ale was named "Best Pale Ale" by The New York Times. Esquire magazine selected Dale's as one of the "Best Canned Beers to Drink Now" in a February 2012 article. Dale's is 6.5% alcohol by volume, and features 65 International Bittering Units (IBUs). Dale Katechis first brewed Dale's Pale Ale in his bathtub while a student at Auburn University. In a 2003 interview, Dale confirmed that coworker Brian Lutz formulated the recipe for the beer.
- Old Chub is a Scotch ale brewed with seven different malts, including crystal and chocolate malts. Old Chub also gets a dash of beechwood-smoked grains imported from Bamburg, Germany. Old Chub is 8% alcohol by volume. Among other medals, Old Chub won a bronze medal in the 2011 Great American Beer Festival Scotch Ale Category. It was originally named HYA (for "here's your ass") and renamed "Old Chub" when it went into production.
- Ten FIDY Imperial Stout is Oskar Blues' seasonal beer with flavors of chocolate, malt, coffee, cocoa and oats. Ten FIDY is 10.5% ABV (hence the name) and is made with two-row malts, chocolate malts, roasted barley, flaked oats and hops with 98 IBUs.
- Mama's Little Yella Pils is a small-batch pilsner. Mama's is made with pale malt, German specialty malts, and traditional (Saaz) and 21st century Bavarian hops. It is also fermented at cool temperatures with a German yeast and has 5.3% ABV and 35 IBUs. Mama's Little Yella Pils won a silver medal in the 2011 Great American Beer Festival Bohemian Style Pilsener Category.

== See also ==
- List of microbreweries
- List of breweries in Colorado
