= Cogent Fibre =

American pine wood chip producer

- Type: Privately held
- Industry: Forestry
- Founded: 2005
- Headquarters: Stamford, Connecticut, United States
- Area served: Worldwide
- Key people: Donald McClure; Robert Mantrop; Geralyn Petrafesa
- Revenue: ▲US$ $69.1 million (2010)
- Website: Official website

Cogent Fibre is an American producer and exporter of pine wood chips. It produces different types of wood chips by harvesting them from the natural thinning of trees and exports them to Asian and European customers for the manufacture of fiberboard, particleboard, wood pellets, and pulp and paper products The privately held company maintains offices in Stamford, Connecticut and Toronto, Ontario in Canada. In 2010, the organization ranked 402 out of 500 companies on INC.’s annual 500/5000 listing of the fastest-growing private companies in the United States.

== History ==
The company was founded in 2005. In 2011, Cogent provided 70 percent of all wood chips imported to Turkey and continued to expand its pine wood chip exports to Austria, China, and Italy. RISI, a company that tracks the global forest products industry, named Cogent Fibre the largest exporter of US wood chips to Europe. In late 2010, the company was featured on the 21st Century Business Television series, a production of Multi-Media Productions.

In 2011, Cogent Fibre reopened a wood chip facility at the Port of Morehead City in North Carolina. The company, along with Industrial Marine Services, invested $1.5 million to rehabilitate the facility.

In 2008, Cogent Fibre earned its certificate of registration for the Sustainable Forestry Initiative, which is “responsible for maintaining, overseeing, and improving a sustainable forestry certification program that is internationally recognized.”
