= Dillon Dam Brewery =

Brewery and restaurant in Dillon, Colorado, United States

- Location: Dillon, Colorado; United States
- Coordinates: 39°37′40″N 106°03′38″W
- Opened: 1997
- Annual production volume: 1,900 US beer barrels (2,200 hL)

Active beers
Name	Type
Dam Lyte	Ale
Wildernest Wheat	Wheat beer
Hefe Weizen	Wheat beer
Paradise Pilsner	Pilsener
Dam Straight Lager	Lager
Extra Pale Ale	Pale ale
Sweet George’s Brown	Porter
McLuhr’s Irish Stout	Stout
Yo Han Bock	Stout

Dillon Dam Brewery is a brewery and restaurant located in Dillon, Colorado, United States.

The brewery opened in February 1997 and is located near Dillon Dam. It has won several awards for its beers. They include:

- Silver Medal at the 2001 Great American Beer Festival for Dam Straight Lager
- Gold Medal at the 2002 World Beer Cup for their Sweet George's Brown
- Bronze Medal at the 2004 Great American Beer Festival for their Extra Pale Ale
- Gold Medal at the 2008 Great American Beer Festival for its Sweet George's Brown
