= Trufresh =

Frozen seafood producer

Trufresh LLC is a frozen seafood producer with a mailing address in Suffield, Connecticut, United States.

Trufresh uses freezing technology from Japan to flash-freeze fish for transport. Businessweek said in 1997 that Trufresh is "a virtual company." As of 1997 Trufresh does not have a corporate headquarters; during the same year the company had a small sales staff. The company outsources its distribution and warehousing. Kevin Vandervoort, the company's CEO in 1997, said during that year that "We're not looking to have a traditional corporate structure. It just isn't necessary."

As of 1997, the sole Trufresh office with overhead was located in a room in Vandervoort's residence in Windsor Locks, Connecticut. The finance operation was performed by the majority owners of the company, who had their offices in Manhattan. The oversight of production occurred in a 4,800 square feet (450 m^{2}) large piece of rented space in a sardine canning plant in Lubec, Maine.

In 2004, the company announced that it discovered that some lobsters that are frozen are able to return to life.
