= SKA Brewing =

Microbrewery in Durango, Colorado, United States

Ska Brewing Company
- Industry: Alcoholic beverage
- Founded: 1995
- Headquarters: 225 Girard Street; Durango, CO 81303; United States
- Products: Beer
- Production output: 21,000+ barrels

Ska Brewing Company is a brewery founded in 1995 by Bill Graham and Dave Thibodeau in Durango, Colorado, United States. Since 2008, the brewery has been located in its current Bodo Industrial Park location. Its beer names and branding revolve around ska and rude boy culture.

In March 2020, after half a decade of planning, Ska Street Brewstillery opened in Boulder, Colorado. That same afternoon it and other restaurants in the state closed due to the coronavirus.
