= Cadenza Innovation =

American lithium-ion battery and energy storage solutions company

- Company type: Privately held company
- Industry: Electric batteries, Renewable energy, Research and development
- Founded: 2012; 14 years ago Wilton, Connecticut, U.S.
- Founder: Christina Lampe-Önnerud
- Headquarters: Danbury, Connecticut, U.S.
- Key people: Christina Lampe-Önnerud, (CEO)
- Products: ESaaS, Electric vehicle batteries, Li-ion batteries
- Website: cadenzainnovation.com

Cadenza Innovation Inc. is an American developer and designer of lithium-ion battery technologies and energy storage. The company was founded in 2012 by inorganic chemist and battery researcher Christina Lampe-Önnerud. Cadenza licenses its lithium ion cell architecture to global manufacturers for various energy storage applications.

== History ==
Lampe-Önnerud founded Cadenza Innovation while working as a member of the senior management for an investment management fund. The company operates a facility in Wilton, Connecticut and has a research unit at the Duracell headquarters in Bethel, Connecticut. The corporate headquarters is located in Danbury, Connecticut inside The Summit at Danbury office complex.

In 2021, Cadenza announced a partnership with Rockwell Automation to establish high performance battery cell production lines.

== Technology ==
Cadenza Innovation's supercell battery architecture is designed to stop propagation during thermal runaway. The design of the batteries combines properties from wound jelly rolls and large prismatic cells to form highly dense lithium-ion battery structures.
