= Fluocortin butyl =

Chemical compound

Clinical data
- Trade names: Lenen, Novoderm, Varlane, Vaspit
- Other names: FCB; SHK-203; Fluocortin 21-butylate; Fluocortin butylate; Fluocortolone-21-carboxylate 21-butyl; 6α-Fluoro-11β-hydroxy-16α-methyl-3,20-dioxopregna-1,4-dien-21-oic acid butyl ester
- Drug class: Corticosteroid; Glucocorticoid

Identifiers
- IUPAC name: Butyl 2-[(6S,8S,9S,10R,11S,13S,14S,16R,17S)-6-fluoro-11-hydroxy-10,13,16-trimethyl-3-oxo-6,7,8,9,11,12,14,15,16,17-decahydrocyclopenta[a]phenanthren-17-yl]-2-oxoacetate
- CAS Number: 41767-29-7
- PubChem CID: 15942715
- ChemSpider: 13085382
- UNII: 6N7OA9MO7O
- KEGG: D04217
- CompTox Dashboard (EPA): DTXSID60194590
- ECHA InfoCard: 100.050.476

Chemical and physical data
- Formula: C_{26}H_{35}FO_{5}
- Molar mass: 446.559 g·mol^{−1}
- 3D model (JSmol): Interactive image
- SMILES: CCCCOC(=O)C(=O)[C@H]1[C@@H](C[C@@H]2[C@@]1(C[C@@H]([C@H]3[C@H]2C[C@@H](C4=CC(=O)C=C[C@]34C)F)O)C)C
- InChI: InChI=1S/C26H35FO5/c1-5-6-9-32-24(31)23(30)21-14(2)10-17-16-12-19(27)18-11-15(28)7-8-25(18,3)22(16)20(29)13-26(17,21)4/h7-8,11,14,16-17,19-22,29H,5-6,9-10,12-13H2,1-4H3/t14-,16+,17+,19+,20+,21-,22-,25+,26+/m1/s1; Key:XWTIDFOGTCVGQB-FHIVUSPVSA-N

Fluocortin butyl (brand names Lenen, Novoderm, Varlane, Vaspit), or fluocortin 21-butylate, is a synthetic glucocorticoid corticosteroid which is marketed in Germany, Belgium, Luxembourg, Spain, and Italy. Chemically, it is the butyl ester derivative of fluocortin.

It was patented in 1971 and approved for medical use in 1977.
