= Cervalis =

American could computing based services company

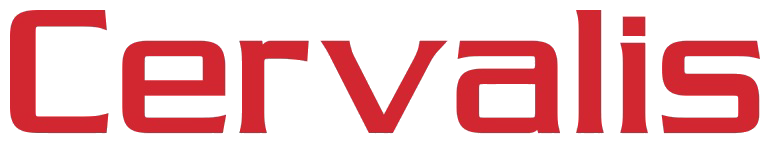
- Traded as: Private
- Industry: IT: Data Centers
- Founded: Cheshire, Connecticut (April 4, 2000)
- Founders: Michael A. Boccardi, Robert Crespi, Robert Carlson
- Headquarters: Norwalk, Connecticut, U.S.
- Area served: Worldwide
- Key people: Michael A. Boccardi, CEO Robert Crespi, CIO, Robert Carlson, Vice President
- Products: Managed and Professional Services, Cloud and Managed Hosting, Colocation, Business Continuity
- Number of employees: 100+
- Website: cervalis.com

Cervalis was a colocation, cloud computing, and managed services company headquartered in Norwalk, Connecticut. Founded in 2000, the company has four data centers throughout the New York Metropolitan Area located in Wappingers Falls, New York; Totowa, New Jersey; Stamford, Connecticut and Norwalk, Connecticut.

Cervalis' Norwalk facility is notable for being the largest data center in the State of Connecticut. All of Cervalis' data centers are Tier III compliant.

== History ==
Cervalis was officially founded on April 4, 2000 by Michael A. Boccardi, Robert Carlson, and Robert Crespi. The name Cervalis was chosen as a portmanteau for "Serve All Information Systems", stylized with a C rather than an S.

Cervalis' first location was in Cheshire, Connecticut, where it was headquartered for a six-month period before moving to Bedford Street in Stamford, Connecticut.

Its first data center was opened in a former IBM facility on May 30, 2001, in Wappingers Falls, New York. Governor George Pataki was in attendance at the opening and helped cut the ribbon to the facility, which he touted as a prime example of how his tax incentives helped to grow the tech industry: "New York State is proud to welcome Cervalis to one of the fastest growing regional economies in the nation - the Hudson Valley Region. As a result of the $100 billion in tax cuts we've enacted and our aggressive efforts to foster the growth of technology-based firms, more and more companies like Cervalis are making the smart decision to invest and grow right here in New York.”

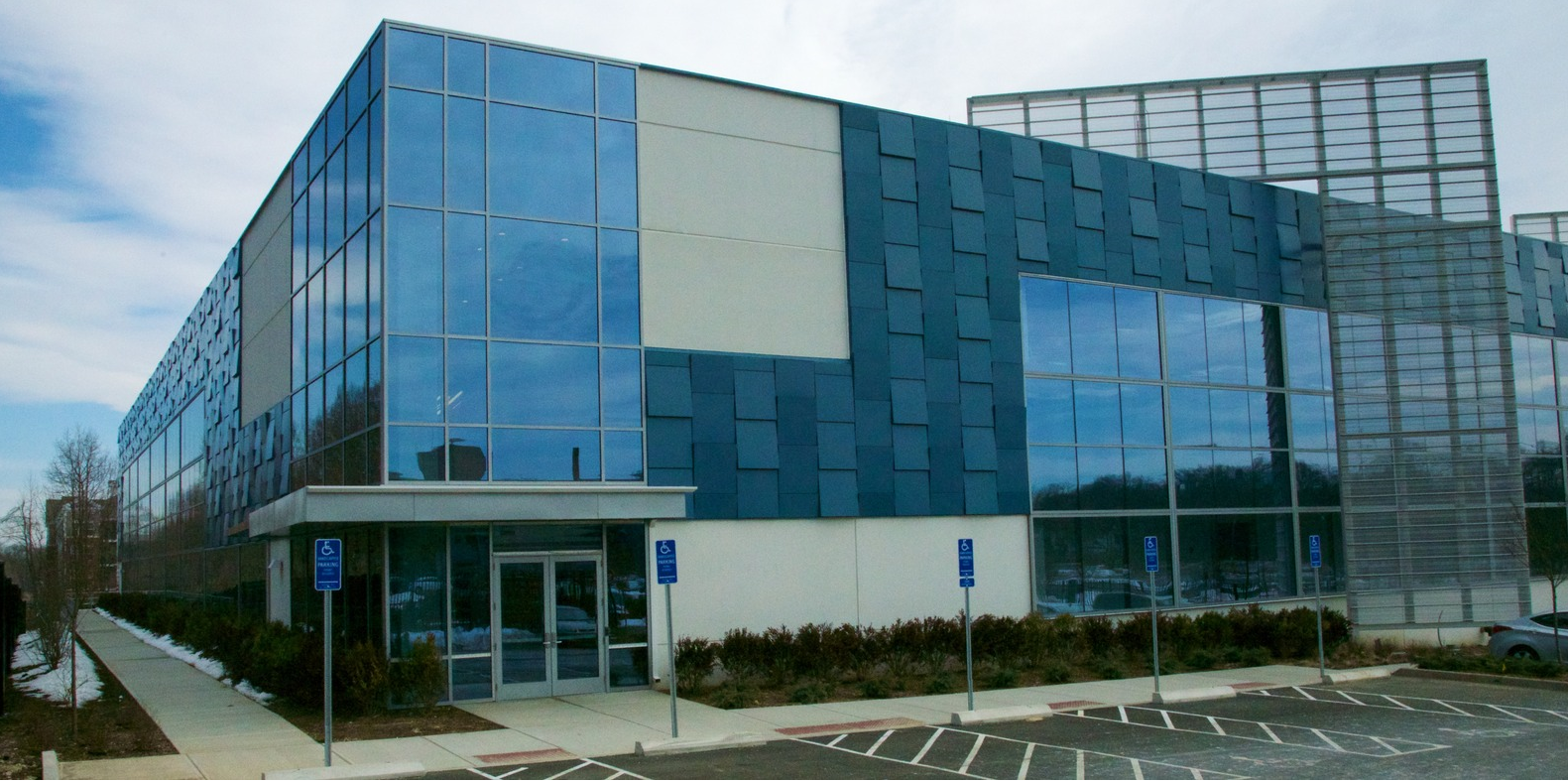
Cervalis' Norwalk facility, Connecticut's largest data center.

In 2007, Cervalis had two major changes: Its second data center, totaling 40,000 square feet, was opened in Stamford, Connecticut; the company subsequently moved from Bedford Street in Stamford to Armstrong Road in Shelton, Connecticut, in a business park formerly occupied by Black & Decker.

In 2010, the company opened up its third facility, totaling 182,000 square feet, in Totowa, New Jersey, in a strategic location less than 20 miles from New York City and easily accessible by both Interstate 80 and the NJ Transit Montclair-Boonton Line.

In December 2013, the company opened its fourth data-center, located in Norwalk, Connecticut. The new facility totals over 168,000 square feet, making it the largest data center in the State of Connecticut. In 2014, the Cervalis headquarters moved from its Shelton location to offices in this facility to obtain a more centralized location to each of its four facilities, and to better accommodate clientele in the New York Metropolitan Area, easily accessed using the Connecticut Turnpike and the Metro-North New Haven Line.

The new facility was built on a site in Norwalk with unique attributes: Besides being located above the 500 year flood plain (an attribute present in all Cervalis facilities), the site straddles the electrical jurisdiction of both Connecticut Light and Power and the Norwalk Third Taxing District Electrical Department, allowing the facility to be dual-powered by two independent electrical companies; offering a greater level of redundancy than the average data center.

In July 2015, Cervalis was acquired by CyrusOne, expanding CyrusOne's footprint into the Northeast.
