= Crystal Rock Holdings =

Crystal Rock Holdings, Inc
- Type: Public
- Industry: Wholesale-groceries & Related products
- Founded: 1965; 61 years ago
- Headquarters: Watertown, Connecticut
- Key people: Peter Baker (President and CEO)
- Products: Vermont Pure and Vermont Pure bottled water, Cool Beans coffee, and other home and office refreshment products
- Website: www.crystalrock.com

Crystal Rock Holdings, Inc is an American company providing home and office refreshment products. The company is based in Watertown, Connecticut, and specializes in office supplies such as bottled water, water coolers, coffee, and other hot-beverage related products. Crystal Rock operates through its subsidiary Crystal Rock LLC throughout the Northeast in the United States. With 16 company acquisitions, Crystal Rock received more than 18,000 customers and about $10.7M in annual sales (2003–2005).

== History ==
Crystal Rock began as a delivery company in 1914 in Stamford, Connecticut, started by Henry Baker, Sr. In 1939, the company established its first water bottling plant. Crystal Rock Waters was founded in 1965, with Henry Baker Jr. serving as President and Chairman of the Board of Directors of the company. Since then, Crystal Rock has grown rapidly in delivering water and non-perishable snacks. In 1988, Crystal Rock moved its official headquarters to Watertown. In 1990, Henry Baker, Jr. was honored by the Bottled Water Hall of Fame and three years later, Peter and Jack Baker were appointed Co-Presidents of Crystal Rock. In 2000, Crystal Rock merged with Vermont Pure water company to cooperate in the bottled water company. In May 2010, Vermont Pure Holdings, Ltd. changed its corporate name to Crystal Rock Holdings, Inc. In 2010, the company went public on the New York Stock Exchange as Crystal Rock Holdings, Inc ( NYSE MKT: CRVP). Crystal Rock has sold office products under its Crystal Rock Office brand since 2011. In 2012, Crystal Rock Learning & Development Center was opened in Watertown for corporate education. In the same year, Crystal Rock acquired the assets of Hartford Stamp and merged the company with Crystal Rock. In 2013 Crystal Rock Holdings, Inc. acquired the assets of Universal Business Equipment Corp. In 2018, Crystal Rock Holdings, announced it had entered into a definitive agreement to be acquired by Cott Corporation for approximately $35 million.

== Products and services ==
Crystal Rock Holdings, Inc is a publicly traded American company (NYSE: MKT:CRVP) headquartered in Watertown, Connecticut. Crystal Rock operates through its subsidiary Crystal Rock LLC, and was founded by Henry Baker, Sr in 1914. Crystal Rock is as an independent delivery service provider of water, coffee and office products to the commercial office and at home markets throughout the Northeast in the United States.

Crystal Rock features 12 distribution centers, and the Company manufactures and markets its own water and coffee brands, including Crystal Rock Waters, Vermont Pure Natural Spring Water and Cool Beans Coffee. Crystal Rock also features water filtration and dispensing systems, a variety of "small package waters like 8 0z-16.9 oz. bottles and cartons" and a "robust coffee portfolio which includes a diverse mix of Arabica and Robusta beans to maximize caffeine." that includes authorized dealer status for Keurig and Green Mountain coffee products.

Additionally, Crystal Rock resells products under its Crystal Rock Office brand that includes traditional office supplies, office furniture, custom printing services, stamps and signs for the office breakroom and janitorial supplies.

== Operations ==
Peter K. Baker serves as the CEO and the President of the company.

=== Management ===
In the 1990s, Peter and Jack Baker became the company's Co-Presidents. As a commitment of the bottled water quality Crystal Rock produced, Peter Baker worked as a chairman of the Board of Directors for the International Bottled Water Association. In 2000, Peter served as the Director and President, and Jack as the Executive Vice President to further developed this family business. Crystal Rock will incorporate vehicles, route operations, customer service personnel as well as consumer data and information systems resources into its existing operations.

=== Research & development ===
In 1988, Crystal Rock developed and patented the No Spill, Water Safe Technology to load water bottles onto coolers. Crystal Rock's special Learning & Development Center (built in 2012) is used for team members education on innovations, system training, new techniques and product information.

== Awards ==
- 1990 - Henry Baker, Jr. is inducted into the Bottled Water Hall of Fame.
- 2011 - Peter Baker, president and CEO, won the 2011 Malcolm Baldrige Community Award, the Waterbury Regional Chamber's highest honor.
