= First County Bank =

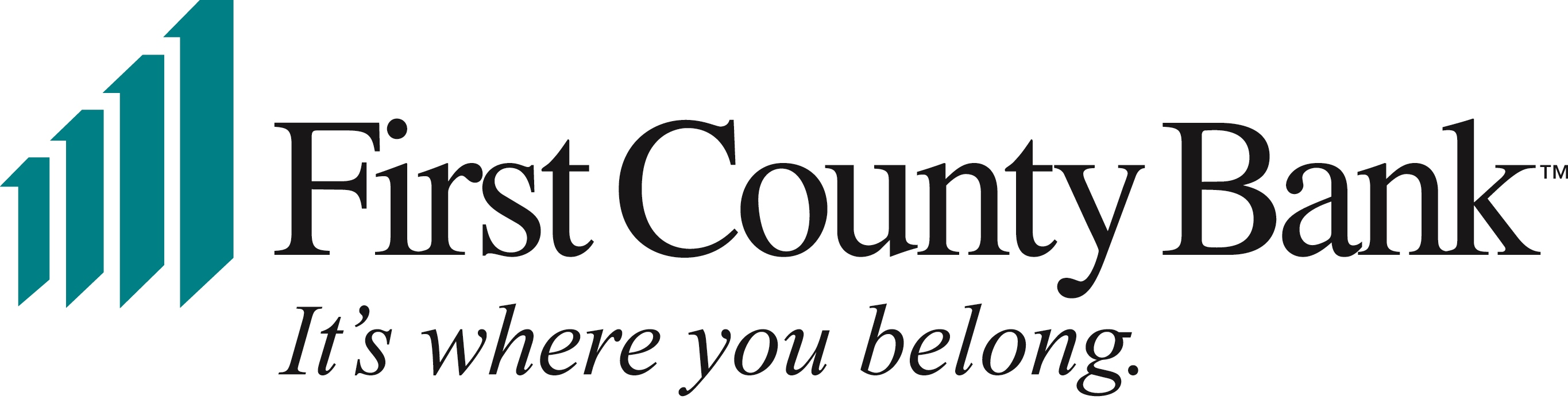
- It's Where You Belong
- Industry: Finance
- Founded: Stamford, Connecticut, U.S. (1851)
- Area served: Fairfield County, Connecticut
- Headquarters: Stamford, Connecticut, U.S.
- Key People: Robert J. Granata, Chairman & CEO
- Number of Employees: Approximately 250
- Revenue: ~1.9 Billion USD
- Website: www.firstcountybank.com

First County Bank is a bank that conducts business primarily in Fairfield County, Connecticut, United States, and is headquartered in Stamford, Connecticut. The Bank has more than 220 employees, assets in excess of $1.9 billion, and is a 2016-2018 Women's Choice Award and 2020-2022 Top Workplaces Award winner. First County Bank is a full-service bank. It provides wealth management services through First County Advisors, the Wealth Management Division of First County Bank.

== Branches ==
First County Bank operates 14 full-service branches in Fairfield County, Connecticut: seven in Stamford; two in Norwalk; and one each in Darien, Greenwich, New Canaan, Westport, and Fairfield.

In 2016, First County Bank opened and operated a limited-access branch at the Academy of Information Technology and Engineering high school, in Stamford, CT. It provided students with an opportunity to learn and perform banking functions. The branch was staffed by high school students who were enrolled in financial literacy education classes and learned banking skills through the internship program. The branch was open only during school hours, with banking services limited to students and faculty members.

== History ==
On September 20, 1851, First County Bank was founded as the Stamford Savings Bank and elected its first president, Theodore Davenport. Stamford Savings Bank made loans for the construction and purchase of homes as well as safeguarded and invested the money of Stamford's residents.

In 1875, Judge John Clason was elected a corporator of Stamford Savings Bank and was immediately made a director. He donated $10,000 to the Ferguson Library and $43,000 in securities to build a hospital in Stamford.

In 1883, the Bank's board voted to build the first Stamford Savings Bank. The building was called "The Old Red Bank" and was constructed by architect Warren R. Briggs.

In 1909, Schuyler Merritt, who became a U.S. Congressman, was elected a corporator of Stamford Savings Bank. The Merritt Parkway, a historic limited-access parkway in Fairfield County, Connecticut, was named after him.

In 1961, Stamford Savings Bank opened its first branch office in Darien. The Bank opened a second branch in 1968 and continued to open branches throughout the early 1980s.

In 1989, the bank changed its name from the Stamford Savings Bank to First County Bank, to better serve other growing towns in Fairfield County.

In 1995, the bank introduced a trust and investments division.

In 2001, First County Bank commemorated its 150th anniversary by establishing the First County Bank Foundation, Inc.

In 2011, Richard E. Taber retired as First County Bank chairman and chief executive officer. First County Bank Foundation, Inc. established the Richard E. Taber Citizenship Award which awards three $5,000 scholarships to college-bound local high school graduating seniors. Katherine A. Harris was appointed as First County Bank's first female President and Chief Operating Officer. Under her leadership, the Bank grew from six to 15 branches. Reyno A. Giallongo, Jr. became First County Bank's Chairman of the Board and Chief Executive Officer, and President of the First County Bank Foundation.

In 2012, First County Bank consolidated its trust and investments division into a new subsidiary, First County Advisors.

In 2014, Harris retired and Robert J. Granata was appointed as President and Chief Operating Officer of the Bank.

In 2016, Giallongo was appointed by the Federal Reserve Bank of New York as a member of the Community Depository Institutions Advisory Council. First County Bank becomes the first independent community bank to receive the Women's Choice Award for Financial Advisors and Firms.

In 2019, Giallongo retired and Robert J. Granata was named Chairman of the Board and Chief Executive Officer, and Willard M. Milley was appointed President and Chief Operating Officer.
