= Pirate Capital =

American investment adviser

- Company type: Private
- Industry: Hedge Fund
- Founded: 2002
- Headquarters: Norwalk, CT
- Key people: Thomas R. Hudson Jr (Founder)

Pirate Capital LLC was an American hedge fund. The firm employed shareholder activism to push for structural changes in target companies.

== History ==
Pirate Capital was founded in 2002 by Thomas R. Hudson Jr with $2 million in savings. Between 2002 and 2006, the hedge fund had joined the boards of eight companies. In May 2005, Pirate had acquired nearly 2 million shares for a 14.8% stake in Cornell Companies, and subsequently nominated seven directors to the company's board. In March 2006, the firm owned 5.8 million shares of Intrawest, and pressured the company to sell. Intrawest was later sold to Fortress Investment Group for $1.8 billion. In June 2006, it pressured Mirant Corporation to drop its takeover bid for NRG Energy. In October 2007, Pirate Capital threatened a proxy battle against Brink's unless the cash handling company adopted changes to its corporate governance.

In September 2007, during the United States bear market of 2007–2009, Pirate Capital suspended redemptions on two of its four funds.

== Investment strategy ==
Pirate Capital operated four funds including the Jolly Roger Activist Fund. The fund purchases stakes in underperforming companies and then pushes for managerial action. The company's motto is: "Surrender the Booty!"

== Key personnel ==
- Thomas R. Hudson, Jr, founder and sole managing partner; formerly managed a portfolio of distressed bank debt at Goldman Sachs. Mr Hudson was fired from Goldman Sachs in 1999 and from Amroc Investments in 2001.
