= Ives Bank (company) =

Community bank in Danbury, Connecticut, US

- Type: Corporation
- Industry: Banking, Mortgages
- Founded: 1849
- Headquarters: Danbury, Connecticut
- Number of locations: 16
- Area served: Connecticut
- Key people: Martin G. Morgado (CEO)
- Subsidiaries: Stamford Mortgage Company
- Website: www.ivesbank.com

Ives Bank (formerly Savings Bank of Danbury), is a full-service community bank and mortgage provider serving customers in Connecticut. The bank is headquartered in Danbury, Connecticut and was founded in 1849.

== History ==
Ives Bank was founded in 1849 in Downtown Danbury, Connecticut. The bank operates 16 branch offices in Bethel, Brookfield, Danbury, New Fairfield, New Milford, Newtown, Norwalk, Southbury, Stamford and Waterbury. Stamford Mortgage Company, a division of Ives Bank, has a local office on Summer Street in Stamford.

logo until 2024

Savings Bank of Danbury officially rebranded to Ives Bank on November 4, 2024. The bank's new name, Ives Bank, honors the founding family, George W. Ives, and his grandson, the famous composer Charles Ives. The bank was founded in 1849 by George W. Ives and originally operated in the Ives home, which is now owned by the Danbury Museum and Historical Society. The rebranding is part of the bank's growth strategy to gain wider appeal to communities outside of Danbury.
