= Brewability =

Brew pub in Englewood, Colorado

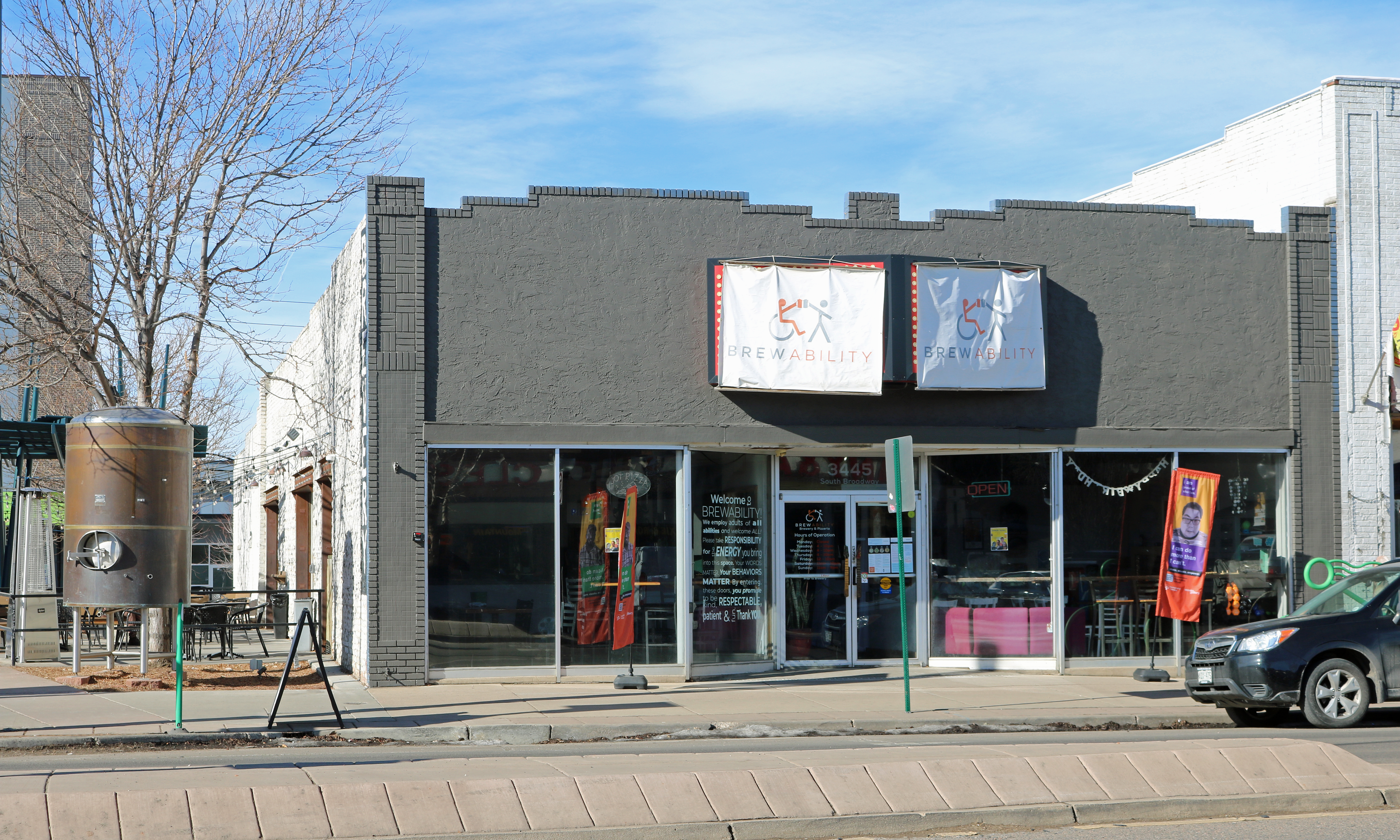
- The front of the restaurant. Note the outdoor tables on the left
- Location: 3445 South Broadway, Englewood, Colorado
- Coordinates: 39°39′14.87″N 104°59′16.28″W
- Opened: 2016
- Key people: Tiffany Fixter
- Website: brew-ability.com

Active beers
(order by color)
| Name | Type |
| Orange | Amber |
| Green | West Coast IPA |
| White | Champagne seltzer |
| Purple | Coffee porter |

Brewability is a combination brewery and pizzeria located in Englewood, Colorado that is notable for its hiring of people with disabilities.

== History ==
Brewability first opened as BrewAbility Lab in a garage in a northeast Denver industrial park in 2016. In late 2018, building on Brewability's early success, the firm opened a second location, a pizzeria called Pizzability in Denver's Cherry Creek neighborhood. The pizzeria was also staffed by people with disabilities. However, Pizzability was unable to generate sufficient revenue to sustain the operation, and it closed in December 2019. At that time, the two locations' assets were all moved to downtown Englewood, Colorado, where the brewery/pizzeria now operates.

The owner and manager of Brewability is Tiffany Fixter, a graduate of Northwest Missouri State University who was once fired from her job as director of a Denver day program for adults with disabilities for demonstrating a lack of creativity.
