= Elk Mountain Brewing Company =

Microbrewery based in Parker, Colorado

Coordinates: 39.5270°N 104.7702°W

- Industry: Alcoholic beverage
- Founded: 2010
- Founder: Tom and Marcia Bell
- Headquarters: Parker, Colorado, United States
- Products: Beer
- Production output: 400 US beer barrels (47,000 L; 12,000 US gal; 10,000 imp gal)
- Owner: Jake Minturn, Doug Hyndman
- Website: http://www.elkmountainbrewing.com/

Elk Mountain Brewing Company is a microbrewery in Parker, Colorado.

== History ==
Jake Minturn and Doug Hyndman purchased the brewery in 2017. They intended to rebrand once the Tax and Trade Bureau had approved the change.

== List of Beers Brewed ==
Name	Style	ABV%
Rock Slide	Amber Ale	5.8
Mine Shaft	Kölsch-style Ale	5.1
Wild Wapiti	Wheat ale	5.7
Ghost Town	Brown Ale	5.6
Elk Horn	Stout	6.8
Ute Bill	Pale Ale	5.3
Puma	India Pale Ale	4.3

== Awards ==
Elk Mountain won a silver medal for their Ghost Town Brown in the first few months of being open.
