= High Precision =

American industrial manufacturing company

High Precision Inc.
- Type: Manufacturer
- Industry: Industrial manufacturing
- Founded: 1945
- Founder: Ermon F. Ayer
- Headquarters: Hamden, Connecticut, United States
- Products: Pneumatic tools, CNC machining
- Website: HighPrecisionInc.com

High Precision Inc. is an American industrial manufacturing company based in Hamden, Connecticut. It was founded in 1945 by Ermon F. Ayer as a flexible contract manufacturer, and is currently under third generation family ownership and management. The company was originally a provider of contract manufacturing services later branching out into motion and torque control, heavy-duty industrial pneumatic tools, and custom CNC machining.

The company currently occupies a 40,000 square foot manufacturing facility in Hamden, CT.

== Products & Services ==
- Pneumatic tools
- Torque limiters
- One-way clutches
- CNC machining
- Injection molding
- Precision assembly
