= New Britain Dry Cleaning Corporation =

American dry cleaning company

- Type: Private
- Industry: Dry cleaning
- Predecessor: New Britain Cleaners
- Founded: 1912; 114 years ago, in New Britain, Connecticut, United States
- Founder: Rudolph J. Kloiber
- Defunct: 1974
- Fate: Merged in 1974 with Howards Cleaners Inc
- Successor: Howards Cleaners Inc.
- Area served: New Britain, Connecticut
- Key people: Rudolph Kloiber, Edgar Kloiber, Woodrow Kloiber
- Parent: Howards Cleaners

The New Britain Dry Cleaning Corporation was a New Britain, Connecticut-based company founded in 1912 by Rudolph J. Kloiber. It grew to become the largest dry cleaning company in the city and one of the largest in central Connecticut before it was sold in 1974.

== History ==
=== Before the Company's Founding ===
Rudolph J. Kloiber was born in what is now Gussing, Austria, in 1884. He immigrated to the United States in 1897 at the age of 13 and settled in Troy, New York, with his uncle and his uncle's family. In 1906, he became a citizen of the United States and moved to New York City to find work. In 1907, he met and married Margaret Rau, an immigrant from Gundersheim, Germany. It was in New York City that he learned the dry cleaning and dye works trade. In 1911, Rudolph moved his wife and family to New Britain, Connecticut.

=== 1912 to 1920 ===
In 1912, at the age of 28, Rudolph and Margaret introduced dry cleaning services to New Britain, Connecticut, when they opened a two-person dry cleaning store on 156 Arch Street. He named his store New Britain Cleaners (later known as the New Britain Dry Cleaning Corporation and NB Cleaners). Over the years, the business expanded and remained the sole dry cleaner in the city for many years.

In 1914, Albert F. Eichstaedt, an acquaintance of Rudolph and Margaret, became interested in the dry cleaning business. An agreement was reached and on July 29, 1914, the business was incorporated under the laws of the State of Connecticut. A Certificate of Incorporation was issued in the name of New Britain Dry Cleaning Corporation with authorized capital stock of 1,000 shares at $25.00 per share or $25,000 ($679,240 in 2021 dollars according to the U.S. Bureau of Labor Statistics’ online CPI calculator). Forty-eight (48) shares of capital stock were issued to commence business, or $1,200 ($32,603 in 2021 dollars). Subscribers to the capital stock were: Rudolph J. Kloiber, 28 shares; Margaret R. Kloiber, 12 shares; and Albert F. Eichstaedt, 8 shares. The Officers and Directors of the new corporation were Rudolph J. Kloiber, President and Director; Margaret R. Kloiber, Vice-President and Director, and Albert F. Eichstaedt, Secretary, Treasurer, and Director.

In 1916, the Directors, recognizing the need for expansion, voted to purchase land and build a two-story building at 265 Cherry Street in New Britain. The land was purchased from Albert Eichstaedt for $250 ($6,531 in 2021 dollars) in exchange for 10 shares of corporate stock. To finance the cost of the new building and equipment, two area banks loaned the corporation a total of $4,600 ($120,173 in 2021 dollars), and 112 additional shares of stock were sold to the Directors at $25 per share for a total of $2,800 ($73,148 in 2021 dollars).

In 1916, the company's gross income was $7,000 ($182,872 in 2021 dollars).

After the plant on 265 Cherry Street was completed in 1917, growth and expansion of the business became more rapid.

In 1918, a sales route was established, a branch store was opened at 72 West Main Street, and a building addition and new equipment were added to the Cherry Street plant.

In 1920 (March 6) at the Annual Meeting of Stockholders, the Treasurer reported assets of $14,014, sales of $27,110, and profits of $3,636 ($197,282, $381,641, and $51,185 respectively, in 2021 dollars). At the meeting, the Directors voted to purchase the corner property on Ellis and Cherry Streets (which was adjacent to the plant on 265 Cherry Street) in the event the plant needed to expand. Purchase price was $7,000 ($98,542 in 2021 dollars). Note: Investing in real estate was always an integral part of the growth in value of the company.

=== 1921 to 1930 ===
In 1921, the Directors again indicated their desire to invest in real estate by purchasing the land and buildings at 96 West Main Street for $29,000 ($414,693 in 2021 dollars). Financing was through the use of corporate earnings, additional capital shares sold to Directors, and a bank mortgage. After the purchase, the branch store on 72 West Main Street was moved to the 96 West Main Street property.

In February, 1924, at the Annual Meeting of Stockholders, a major decision in the history of the Corporation was made, that being to sell the properties on Cherry and Ellis Streets and to build a new, modern dry cleaning plant at 411-415 West Main Street. The property at 411-415 West Main Street was purchased for $17,000 ($266,984 in 2021 dollars) and a building was constructed for $33,232 ($521,907 in 2021 dollars) to house the business and to provide a six-room apartment for the Kloiber family. Additional funds were spent for major steam, plumbing, and electrical installations.

In January, 1925, the new, 16,000 square foot plant at 411-415 West Main Street was occupied. The plant included administrative offices, route delivery racks, and room for the dry cleaning, spotting, finishing, and dyeing departments. At the Annual Meeting of Stockholders in February, the property at 383 West Main Street, formerly purchased as a possible site for the new plant, was voted to be sold and the realized profit applied toward the new plant. Later in the year, the corporation sold the building and property on 265 Cherry Street.

1926 marked the temporary end of a rapid growth and expansion period of the dry cleaning business which began in 1916. While records show that from 1926 to 1930 dollar volume profitability increased substantially, the Directors concerned themselves with consolidating their business gains.

=== 1931 to 1942 ===
In 1933, Edgar, 22, (Rudolph's oldest son) joined the company. During the early depression years, management struggled to keep the business solvent. Wages and salaries were cut to the bone. Dry cleaning prices were slashed. To meet new cut-rate competition, the plant was streamlined in an effort to reduce costs and increase efficiency. By 1936, the future looked brighter and the Directors voted to build an addition onto the rear of the plant for a new rug cleaning department. A new blanket brushing machine, drying tumbler, and curtain dryer were also purchased at this time.

In 1936, Albert Eichstaedt, Secretary, Treasurer, and Director retired from the business. His stock interest of 672 shares was purchased by the corporation for $18,500 ($364,230 in 2021 dollars) and his shares were retired as treasury stock. Edgar R. Kloiber, was elected as Secretary and Assistant Treasurer.

From 1937 to 1942, the New Britain Dry Cleaning Corporation underwent a complete change in methods of advertising, selling, and production. Branch stores were opened at 388 Main Street and 45 Main Street in New Britain, and 1037 Main Street in Newington, Connecticut. Route service was increased to three routes. New services were introduced including cold fur storage, hat blocking, and fur and leather cleaning. Sales increased from $58,645 in 1937 to $100,473 in 1942 ($916,079 to $1,747,097 in 2021 dollars). In 1940, Woodrow, 23, (Rudolph's youngest son) joined the company.

=== 1943 to 1950 ===
During the war years, growth in the dry cleaning industry was restricted so the corporation invested in real estate.

In 1943, the corporation purchased a business block at 60 West Main Street for $47,500 ($763,642 in 2021 dollars).

In 1946, the Directors voted to remodel the building at 60 West Main Street at a cost of $28,679.11 ($428,130 in 2021 dollars). The building was named the “Kloiber Building” providing three business stores on the ground floor and modern offices on the second floor.

In 1946, the company had five stores (one at the main plant, three others in New Britain, and one in Newington). The Treasurer's report for that year showed sales of $195,003 ($2,911,073 in 2021 dollars) and rental income from investment properties of $14,710.00 ($219,596 in 2021 dollars).

In 1947, Rudolph, founder, President, and Director of the New Britain Dry Cleaning Corporation, died at the age of 63. At a special meeting of the Board of Directors, Edgar R. Kloiber, 36, was elected President and Treasurer, and Woodrow G. Kloiber, 30, was elected Assistant Treasurer and Secretary. Margaret, cofounder, remained Vice-President and Director of the Corporation.

=== 1951 to 1960 ===
In 1951, the company expanded its operations to include laundering shirts. The new shirt laundry department started with two women doing 1,000 shirts a week. By 1954, the operation expanded fivefold to 5,000 shirts per week.

By 1953, total sales rose to $300,000 ($3,064,240 in 2021 dollars).

In 1954, the company's estimated share of the total cleaning volume in the New Britain area was 70%. Cash and carry trade (as opposed to route men picking up and delivering clothing) accounted for approximately 75% of the company's volume.

Also in 1954, a major decision faced management. The issue was whether to buy new, more efficient, dry cleaning equipment that would increase productivity and provide better service to their customers or wait, because (1) management knew their dry cleaning equipment was fairly new and had been kept in excellent condition, (2) the country was in the midst of a recession, (3) business, in general, was leveling off throughout the nation due to the recession, and (4) economists warned companies to proceed with caution. However, the company officers were inclined to be optimistic about the future of their company for, in spite of two world wars, a Great Depression, and the current recession, the business had grown steadily, year in and year out, since 1912 when it was founded. They felt that much of the growth was attributed to the company's policy of offering the finest cleaning at the lowest possible prices in keeping with quality service. The new system of dry cleaning appeared to offer a superior way of processing garments and improving service. After weighing the pros and cons, they decided to spend more than $40,000 ($404,008 in 2021 dollars) for the new dry cleaning equipment. The new equipment replaced a number of smaller dry cleaning units, freed up more production space, and released employees for other work in the plant. Two dry cleaners could now do the work of three and spotting work decreased by 70%. The net result was that production costs decreased, production capacity doubled, and the processing time was cut in half.

In 1955, there were 65 employees, five route delivery drivers, and nine stores (seven in New Britain, including one at the main plant and one in the downtown Kloiber Building; one in Newington; and one in West Hartford, Connecticut).

=== 1961 to 1970 ===
In 1962, to better serve the public, the company opened New Britain's first combination coin-operated dry cleaning and laundry store—NB Clean-O-Mat—at 987 West Main Street.

In 1967, there were 60 employees and 11 stores (eight in New Britain, including the store at the main plant, and one each in Newington, Plainville, Connecticut, and Wethersfield, Connecticut).

The company grew to become one of the largest dry cleaning companies in central Connecticut. There were special departments for dry cleaning clothes, furs, rugs, blankets, and draperies; and for laundering shirts. Mothproofing and waterproofing clothes were also offered. There was also a specially constructed large refrigerated cold storage vault for furs and other clothing that needed to be stored at cold temperatures for long periods of time.

In 1969, Margaret Kloiber, co-founder, Vice-President, and Director of the Corporation, died at the age of 93. At a special meeting of the Board of Directors, Woodrow Kloiber was named Vice-President, Assistant Treasurer, and Secretary.

In 1969, as a result of being displaced by the new multilane route 72 highway that bisected New Britain, the main plant moved for the last time to a new facility at 544 West Main Street.

=== 1971 to 1974 ===
In 1974, a major merger occurred when Edgar Kloiber and Woodrow Kloiber were ready to retire. They sold the business to Williard and John Moneymaker, owners of Howards Cleaners Inc. The objectives of the purchase were to maintain a high volume of work, increase the efficiency of both companies, and stabilize prices. Both firms retained their individual names for marketing purposes and the New Britain Dry Cleaning Corporation's main plant serviced both companies because of its modern equipment, including a completely conveyorized and computerized dry cleaning system.

=== Working conditions ===
Working conditions in a dry cleaning and laundry plant during the summer months were brutally hot, temperatures often rising to 100 degrees or more. Salt tablets were the norm of the day. Modern air conditioning, even if available, was not appropriate in the plant. Rudolph, and later his sons, did all they could to make working conditions bearable on the shop floor by opening windows, using fans, and scheduling work breaks because they cared about their employees and recognized the value of happy, experienced, and loyal employees. They rewarded their employees with regular pay raises and bonuses. They encouraged suggestions to improve the operations of individual departments within the business. They held holiday season parties and outings for their employees on a regular basis and honored longtime employees at appropriate times.

Many articles appeared in the New Britain Herald over the years mentioning surprise bonuses, parties, testimonials, and outings for the employees in appreciation of their work. For example, the New Britain Herald reported that employees of the New Britain Dry Cleaning Corporation were surprised when they received along with their regular pay in July, a bonus from the earnings made during April, May, and June that amounted to eight percent for the employees who had worked during those three months and four percent to employees who had worked less than three months.

Holiday season parties were the traditional time to announce end-of-year bonuses. For example, in 1945, the New Britain Herald reported that following a Christmas dinner, Rudolph Kloiber presented bonuses to the employees based on the time they worked for the company. Employees working five or more years received a bonus of 15% of their quarterly wages; those working one to four years, received 10%; and those working six months to one year received 5% of their quarterly wages.

On December 13, 1948, the New Britain Herald reported that during the New Britain Dry Cleaning Corporation's annual Christmas party, a bonus was given to all employees by Woodrow Kloiber on the following basis: A full week's pay was given to employees who had been with the company for one or more years, and a half week's pay to employees who were hired during the previous six months. A donation of $62 ($578 in 2011 dollars) was given to a former employee who was ill.

Testimonials and gifts for employees reaching service milestones or at retirement were the norm. Watches were given to employees reaching 25 years of service. In an article that appeared in the New Britain Herald on December 20, 1967, it was reported that Mr. Frank Merkle, retiring after 50 years of service, was presented with a color television from the company and a purse of money from the employees at the company's annual Christmas party. A picture accompanying the article shows Mr. Merkle with five other longtime employees totaling 193 years of service with the company.

Another way of keeping in touch with employees was a monthly newsletter which was published by the company and distributed to all workers. Called the Spotfinder, this small publication included news of anniversaries, retirements, illnesses, expressions of sympathy to those who had lost family members, etc., all interspersed with jokes and news of past employees. The November 1, 1944, issue emphasized workers' rights as citizens. The issue stated “The Spotfinder has no political affiliations and has no intentions to talk politics. It is, however, the duty of self and country of all who are eligible to vote to cast their ballot on November 7th, and may the best man win. On our local state ticket, we have, as most of us know, one of our own fellow workers who is running for State Representative on the Democratic ticket. She is none other than Sophie Liss of the silk finishing department and the Spotfinder takes pleasure to congratulate her on her rapid strides in politics and wishes her luck in this campaign.”

=== Involvement in the community ===
The New Britain Dry Cleaning Corporation served many organizations in the community as well as their retail customers. Among the company's services was cleaning the New Britain High School football uniforms and cleaning the Normal School's curtains and blankets. Workers would go to the Normal School, remove all the draperies and rehang them when done.

Besides managing the company, Rudolph Kloiber was personally active in community affairs. He was a deacon and member of the People's Church on Court Street, a member of the Benevolent and Protective Order of Elks, and a member of the Lions Club International, New Britain chapter. Rudolph was also well known for helping the blind and was a member of the Lions Club's Blind Committee for many years. In 1946, during his chairmanship of the committee, he donated, free of charge, the use of a building that he owned at 92 West Main Street for the blind who lived in New Britain and surrounding towns. Rudolph, and members of the Lions Club, renovated the building to include rooms for recreation, education, and social gatherings. A ground floor retail store was incorporated into the renovation for the sale of articles made by the blind.

At the state level, Rudolph was a member of the Connecticut Cleaners and Dyers State Advisory Committee to work with the State Consumer Committee in handling dry cleaning and dyeing consumer problems in the state. The advisory committee, which was composed of representatives of retail dry cleaners, chain store cleaners, and wholesale cleaners, was the authoritative source through which information from the State Consumer Committee was distributed to the cleaning and dyeing industry. The committee also made suggestions regarding which policies or methods should be adopted by the State Consumer Committee.

=== End of an era ===
In what started as a two-person dry cleaning business in 1912 grew to become a strong and successful business presence in New Britain. The New Britain Dry Cleaning Corporation became the largest dry cleaning company in New Britain and one of the largest in central Connecticut before it was sold in 1974, 62 years after it was founded. Success was achieved through difficult times (World War I, the Great Depression, and World War II) and prosperous times (two postwar recoveries) because of Rudolph Kloiber's, and later Edgar Kloiber's and Woodrow Kloiber's, business approach to take calculated risks, offer their customers quality work at reasonable prices, and care for their employees as evidenced in this history.

Lastly, all the men who ran the New Britain Dry Cleaning Corporation have died. Rudolph died in 1947 as was previously stated; Woodrow died in 1992; and Edgar died in 2006.
