= Newtown Savings Bank =

- Type: Corporation
- Industry: Banking, Mortgages
- Founded: 1855
- Headquarters: Newtown, Connecticut
- Number of locations: 15
- Area served: Connecticut
- Key people: Kenneth L. Weinstein (CEO)
- Subsidiaries: Newtown Investment Services Inc.
- Website: nsbonline.com

Branch locations map (as of October 2018)

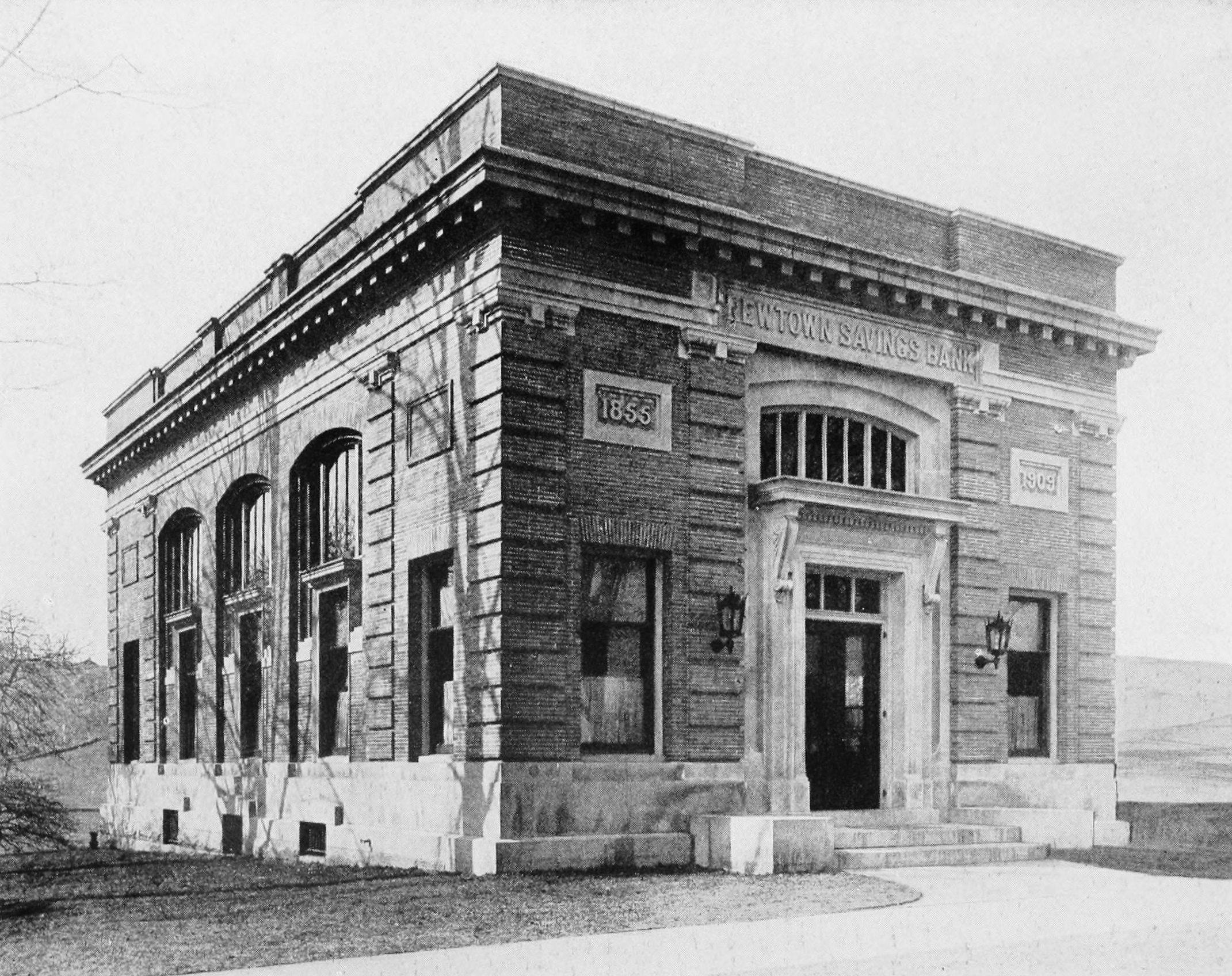
Newtown Savings Bank Building in Newtown, as seen in 1917

Newtown Savings Bank, is a full-service community bank and mortgage provider serving customers in Connecticut. The bank is headquartered in Newtown, Connecticut and was founded in 1855.

== History ==
Newtown Savings Bank was founded in 1855. The bank was the 23rd savings institution founded in Connecticut. The current headquarters was completed in 1910, and is located at 39 Main Street in Newtown. The bank has 15 locations, and owns the subsidiary Newtown Investment Services Inc., which it founded in 1995. In 2016, the bank's regional lending center opened in the town of Hamden, Connecticut. In 2016, the bank filed to become a holding company.
