= Tobin Arms =

- Company type: Private
- Industry: Weapons
- Founded: 1905 in Norwich, Connecticut, United States
- Founder: Frank Major Tobin
- Defunct: 1925
- Fate: Dissolved
- Successor: Gladstone Blake Crandall, trading as "Manufacturer of Tobin Guns (Successor to Tobin Arms Co.)"
- Headquarters: Woodstock, Ontario, Canada
- Area served: United States and Canada
- Key people: A.L. Potter ^{vice-president}, and B.H. Palmer ^{secretary-treasurer}
- Products: Shotguns

Tobin Arms was a firearms company started in 1905 in Norwich, Connecticut, United States. It produced side-by-side and double-barrel shotguns in various grades. The company moved to Woodstock, Ontario, Canada in 1909 or 1910. It then made shotguns until 1925 before shutting down.

== History ==
Frank Major Tobin was born in Halifax, Nova Scotia, Canada, on January 24, 1862. As a young man, he shipped out on a whaler, but the sea did not prove to be a lasting calling. He was drawn to the American west, and there he met and married his wife Anna, who was also born in Canada, in August 1868. Frank and Anna's first child was born in Nebraska in March 1892. The next two children were born in Illinois. By 1897 Frank was in Norwich, Connecticut, working as a sales agent for W.H. Davenport Firearms Company. By 1901 he had a similar position with Hopkins & Allen Arms Company. Somehow when he was on the road for these Norwich companies he acquired the rights to Patent No. 498,043 for a breech-loading firearm, granted May 23, 1893, to C.M. Wollam of San Francisco, California. The Tobin Arms Manufacturing Company of Norwich, Connecticut was incorporated in 1903 with F.M. Tobin as president, A.L. Potter as vice-president, and B.H. Palmer as secretary-treasurer. The company purchased a site formerly occupied by a grist mill, which was rebuilt and new buildings added, and commenced production of a hammerless double-barrel shotgun based on Wollam's patent. All the Tobin guns I’ve examined carry the stamp on the watertable “Pat’d May 23-93 and Patents Pending.” The gun was marketed as the Tobin Simplex Gun. The first guns were shipped in September 1904. The Tobin Simplex Gun was produced in a variety of grades from $30 to $200, and with options of either automatic ejectors or a single-selective trigger for $20, or both for $40. On the highest grade, internal parts were gold plated and ejectors or the single-selective trigger were each $25 extra. At the same time, ejectors were $5 extra on a Remington. The lower grade guns used Trojan Nitro Steel barrels, the middle grades had Fluid Steel Krupp Essen barrels, and the highest grades offered the choice of Fluid Steel Krupp Essen or DeMoya Fluid Steel. Production of guns in 12- and 16-gauge continued in Norwich into 1909, and the generally accepted figure is that 11,089 hammerless doubles were produced in Norwich.

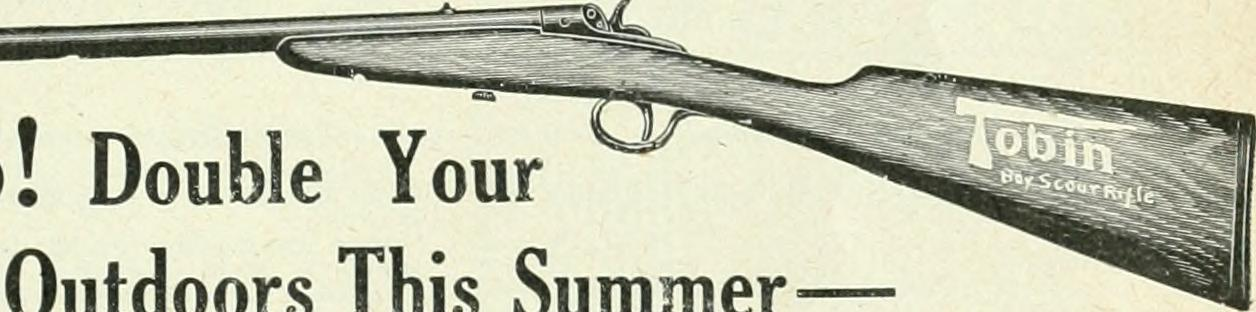
Tobin Arms advertisement

Tobin Arms Manufacturing Company, Limited, was incorporated on August 9, 1909, with its principal place of business stated as Woodstock, Ontario, Canada. Again the company produced a line of Tobin Simplex Guns in 12- and 16-gauge and a variety of grades from $25 to $250. In addition, a hammer double using the same frame and bolting as the hammerless was added to the line at $20, and a simple .22 caliber single-shot Boy Scout rifle was added to the line of shotguns at $5. Advertising by Tobin Arms Manufacturing Company, Ltd. continued into 1916, but by then at least part of the factory had been taken over by the Arnold Thompson Tool Company. The generally accepted serial number range for hammerless doubles was 11,090 to 18,395. Tobin Arms Manufacturing Company, Ltd. is not listed in the Woodstock City Directories after 1916, and its charter was surrendered to the Provincial Secretary and Registrar on December 19, 1921. Frank Major Tobin lived the rest of his life in Woodstock. For many years he was secretary of the Canadian Stove Manufacturers Association. He was also involved in the marketing of a collapsible boat and early experiments with milk cartons. Frank Tobin died October 10, 1939.

G.B. Crandall was granted U.S. Patent No. 862,717 on August 6, 1907, for a rifle sight. He filed application for the patent on November 13, 1906. His residence was listed as Cherry Valley, County of Prince Edward, Ontario.

=== About DeMoya ===
One of the Tobin catalogs or period ads states that the entire production of De Moya steel barrels had been spoken for by the Tobin company.

De Moya had an address in Liege. He had registered several trade names Acier De Moya, De Moya Fluid Steel & De Moya Fluss Stahl. Jose De Moya, 297 rue St. Gilles, 1904.

Who else he sold to or how long he was in business in Liege is unknown. He filed a patent, 842802, with the US Patent office in which he claims to live in Paris in 1905. The patent was granted in 1907.
