= Primacy (company) =

- Formerly: Acsys Interactive
- Company type: Digital Marketing Agency
- Industry: Digital Marketing Agency, Digital Strategy, Marketing
- Founded: 1994
- Founder: Stan Valencis
- Headquarters: West Palm Beach, FL, Farmington, CT, Boston, MA, West Palm Beach, FL
- Number of locations: 3
- Area served: Worldwide
- Number of employees: 120
- Website: www.theprimacy.com

Primacy (formerly known as Acsys Interactive) is an independent digital agency with offices in West Palm Beach, FL, Boston, MA, and Farmington, Connecticut.

Primacy provides clients in the consumer goods, financial services, health care, manufacturing, and higher education industries with strategy, design and user experience, marketing, technology, branding, mobile, media planning and buying, cybersecurity, accessibility, and other services.

Primacy was founded in 1994 by President Stan Valencis. It has 3 office branches in the United States, Farmington, New York, Boston and West Palm Beach. Incorporated in 1994 as Acsys Interactive, the company rebranded as Primacy in 2012 and moved into a newly renovated office building. The company employs over 120 people across their three locations.

Primacy received more than 40 awards in 2014, showing significant recognition in its industry. Recent awards have included Four eHealthcare Leadership Awards (2019), and the Gold Circle of Excellence Award from the Council for Advancement and Support of Education.

Additionally, Primacy has been featured in a number of reports from the independent research company, Forrester Research Inc., including Global Performance Marketing Agencies, Best Practices for Inclusive Design, B2B Marketing Agencies, and Digital Strategy firms for Digital Transformation in Healthcare.
