= Fairfield County Bank =

- Company type: Corporation
- Industry: Banking
- Founded: 1871
- Founder: Dr. Daniel L. Adams (First President of Ridgefield Savings Bank), William K. James (First President of Fairfield County Savings Bank)
- Headquarters: Ridgefield, Connecticut
- Number of locations: 17
- Area served: Fairfield County, Connecticut
- Key people: David A. Schneider (CEO) Ralph L. Depanfilis (Chairman) Daniel L. Berta (President)
- Website: fairfieldcountybank.com

Fairfield County Bank, is a full-service community bank serving customers in Fairfield County, Connecticut. The bank is headquartered in Ridgefield, Connecticut and was founded in 1871.

Branch locations map (as of March 2018)

== History ==
In 1871, Ridgefield Savings Bank opened its first office at Old Hundred now the Aldrich Museum. The bank was a part of the Bailey & Gage store. In 1874, Fairfield County Savings Bank opened its first office on Wall Street, Norwalk. In 2004, the two banks, Ridgefield Bank and Fairfield County Savings Bank, come together as Fairfield County Savings Bank.

on 12/10/24, Global insurance broker Hub International Limited announced that it has acquired the assets of Fairfield County Bank Insurance Services, LLC. Terms of the transaction were not disclosed. https://www.insurancejournal.com/news/east/2024/12/10/804290.htm
