= Fort Collins Brewery =

Brewery in the United States

- Logo
- Location: Fort Collins, Colorado; United States
- Opened: 1992
- Annual production volume: 9,000 US beer barrels (11,000 hL)
- Owner: The Peters Family

Active beers
Name	Type
Chocolate Stout	American stout
Red Banshee	American amber ale
Rocky Mountain IPA	American IPA

Seasonal beers
Name	Type
Oktoberfest	Oktoberfest
Big Shot	Winter Warmer
Maibock	Maibock
Major Tom’s Pomegranate Wheat	Witbier
DoppelBock	Doppel Bock
Hefeweizen	Hefeweizen
Hoptitude	Extra Imperial Pale Ale
Double Chocolate Stout	American Stout

Fort Collins Brewery (FCB) was a craft beer brewery located in Fort Collins, Colorado.

== History ==
Fort Collins Brewery was founded on June 1, 1992, by Sandy Jones, Karen Jones. Originally named the H.C. Berger Brewing Company, Fort Collins Brewery had a capacity of 8,840 Barrels and Jesse Angell serving as the head brewer.

The Joneses sold the business in 1996. It was seized from the new owners in 2002 for failure to pay taxes, and the Joneses took it back in August 2003. In 2004, Tom Peters and Jan Peters took over.

In August 2010, the brewery moved and expanded to include a self-owned restaurant called Gravity 1020, which opened on May 12, 2011, for dinner under command of Chef Brian Shaner. Fort Collins Brewery is one of 13 production breweries to include a restaurant. As of 2011, the company employed 60 workers.

Fort Collins Brewery used about 2.5 million gallons of water in 2012.

In the summer of 2017, the land, building and assets of Fort Collins Brewery, but not the brand itself, was purchased by Red Truck Brewing Company which assumed control of the 35,000 ft^{2} (3,300 m^{2}) facility on August 1, 2017, and opened for business on August, 18th, 2018.

== Distribution ==
Fort Collins Brewery beer was found in the following states:

- Arizona
- Colorado
- Illinois
- Iowa
- Kansas
- Montana
- Nebraska
- New Jersey
- New York
- North Carolina
- Ohio
- Pennsylvania
- South Carolina
- Tennessee
- Virginia
- Wisconsin
- Wyoming

Fort Collins Brewery Beer was also exported to Sweden.

== Beers ==
Full Time Production

- Red Banshee, Red Alt Ale
- Shot Down, Chocolate Stout
- Far Away, IPA
- Major Tom's, Pomegranate Wheat

Seasonal Production

- Double Down, Gose IPA
- Sled God, Winter Warmer
- Oktoberfest

Savor Series

- Kettle Soured Dark Cherry Imperial
- Oud Bruin
- Rum Barrel-Aged Imperial Chocolate Stout

Retired Brews

- Rocky Mt. IPA
- Chocolate Stout
- Maibock
- Hoptitude
- Doppel Bock
- Double Chocolate Stout
- Big Shot
- Out of the Ashes Series
- Malt Monster Series
- Farm Dog, Farmhouse Ale

== Awards ==
- Great American Beer Festival Medals: 2006 Bronze for Doppelbock. 2012 Gold for Bambostic, Rauch Bier, 2015 Gold for Oktoberfest
- Red Banshee: 2012 US Open Beer Championship, Silver medal, American Red category
- Bambastic: 2012 Great American Beer Festival, Gold medal, Smoke Beer category

== See also ==
- Barrel-aged beer
