= Plainfield Asset Management =

American hedge fund (2005–2012)

- Company type: Private company
- Industry: Investments
- Founded: 2005 in Greenwich, Connecticut
- Founder: Max Holmes
- Defunct: 2012
- Fate: Liquidated and dissolved
- Headquarters: Stamford, Connecticut, United States
- Key people: Max Holmes
- Products: hedge fund
- Website: www.pfam.com

Plainfield Asset Management is a defunct hedge fund that specialized in managing investment capital on behalf of institutions and high-net-worth individuals. The firm worked with clients in the United States and abroad, and maintained offices in Greenwich, Connecticut before transitioning to its disaster recovery site in Stamford, CT. At the end of May 2012, Plainfield substantially completed the liquidation of the funds which it managed and deregistered.

== History ==
Plainfield was founded in 2005 by Max Holmes, the former Head of the Distressed Securities Group and a managing director of D. E. Shaw & Co., L.P.

=== Hedge Fund Lending ===
On June 8, 2011, The New York Times ran an article discussing the trend of hedge funds lending money to businesses who have been unable to secure loans from traditional lenders. In the article, Max Holmes warns of the dangers hedge fund may find themselves in when engaging in this practice, “The new funds rushing into direct lending now will learn the hard way that it is easy to make what appear to be sound loans as the economy is improving, but it becomes brutal to either collect the loans or foreclose when the downturn comes.”

=== 2008 performance ===
According to Fortune Magazine, “By the end of 2008, 93 percent of Plainfield's assets were illiquid -- and Plainfield was compelled to prevent investors from leaving.” According to the same article: Plainfield's flagship fund witnessed 21.5% decline in 2008. Following the firm's deregulation and liquidation, investigations into lending practices conducted by the S.E.C. and Attorney General's office were concluded and, according to HFM Week, the firm received a letter from the SEC indicating its investigation was concluded with no action to be taken.
