= Snake Indian Formation =

Geologic formation in Canada

- Stratigraphic range: Middle Cambrian; ~509–500 Ma
- Type: Formation
- Underlies: Eldon Formation, Titkana Formation
- Overlies: Gog Group
- Thickness: Up to 610 metres (2000 ft)

Lithology
- Primary: Shale
- Other: Limestone, siltstone

Location
- Coordinates: 53°03′07″N 118°11′57″W
- Region: Canadian Rockies
- Country: Canada

Type section
- Named for: Snake Indian River
- Named by: E.W. Montjoy and J.D. Aitken

The Snake Indian Formation is a stratigraphic unit of Middle Cambrian age that is present on the western edge of the Western Canada Sedimentary Basin in the northern Canadian Rockies of Alberta and British Columbia. It was named for Snake Indian River in Jasper National Park by E.W. Montjoy and J.D. Aitken in 1978. The type locality was established on Chetamon Mountain.

== Lithology and deposition ==
The Snake Indian Formation was deposited in shallow marine environments along the western shoreline of the North American Craton during Middle Cambrian time. It is a thick sequence of shale and calcareous shale with interbeds of limestone and siltstone. Mudcracks in the basal shales indicate that there were periods of subaerial exposure during the early stages of deposition.

== Distribution and stratigraphic relationships ==
The Snake Indian Formation is present in the northern Canadian Rockies of Alberta and British Columbia where it reaches thicknesses of up to about 610 metres (2000 ft). It unconformably overlies the Gog Group, and is conformably overlain by the Titkana Formation in the north and the Eldon Formation in the south. It is equivalent to the Mount Whyte, Cathedral, and Stephen Formations of the southern Canadian Rockies.

== Paleontology ==
The Snake Indian Formation is fossiliferous and includes the remains of several genera of Middle Cambrian trilobites, as well echinoderms, other marine invertebrates, and stromatolites.
