= Stanley Glacier =

Glacier in British Columbia, Canada

Coordinates: 51.188°N 116.052°W

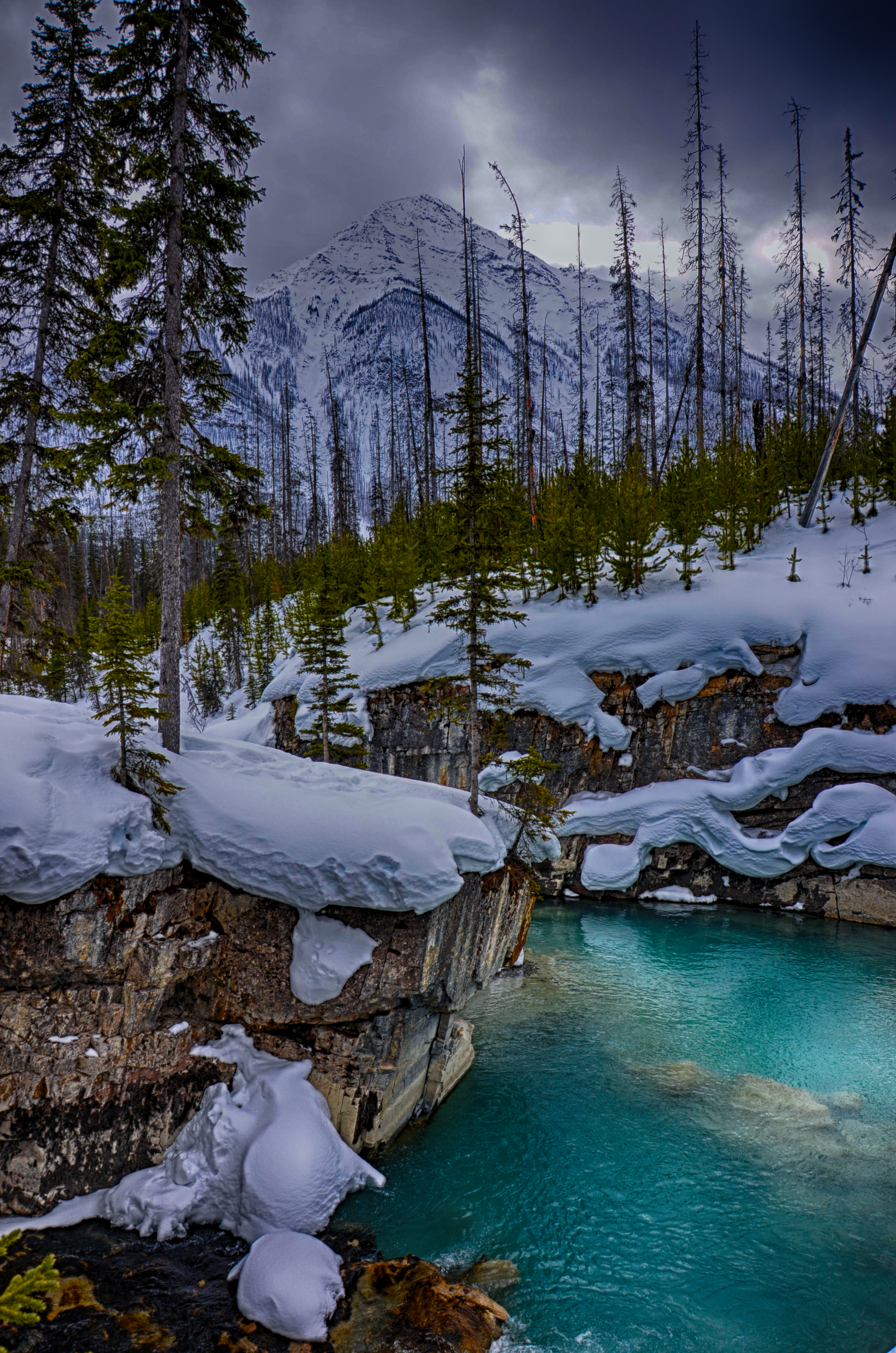
Stanley Glacier in November 2017

The Stanley Glacier locality in British Columbia is an exposure of the "thin" Stephen Formation exhibiting soft-tissue preservation. Fossils were discovered by a hiker who reported the find to Parks Canada; this brought the site to the attention of scientists who were able to study the site and describe the new biota. The discovery of Burgess Shale-type preservation in the thin Stephen was unexpected, given the absence of the Cathedral escarpment in the area. Several new species, including Stanleycaris, have already been found in exploratory excavations at the site.

Map of the Burgess Shale (Stephen Formation), as well as the Mount Whyte Formation. Major Localities within the shale are shown.

The glacier is named for Frederick Stanley.
