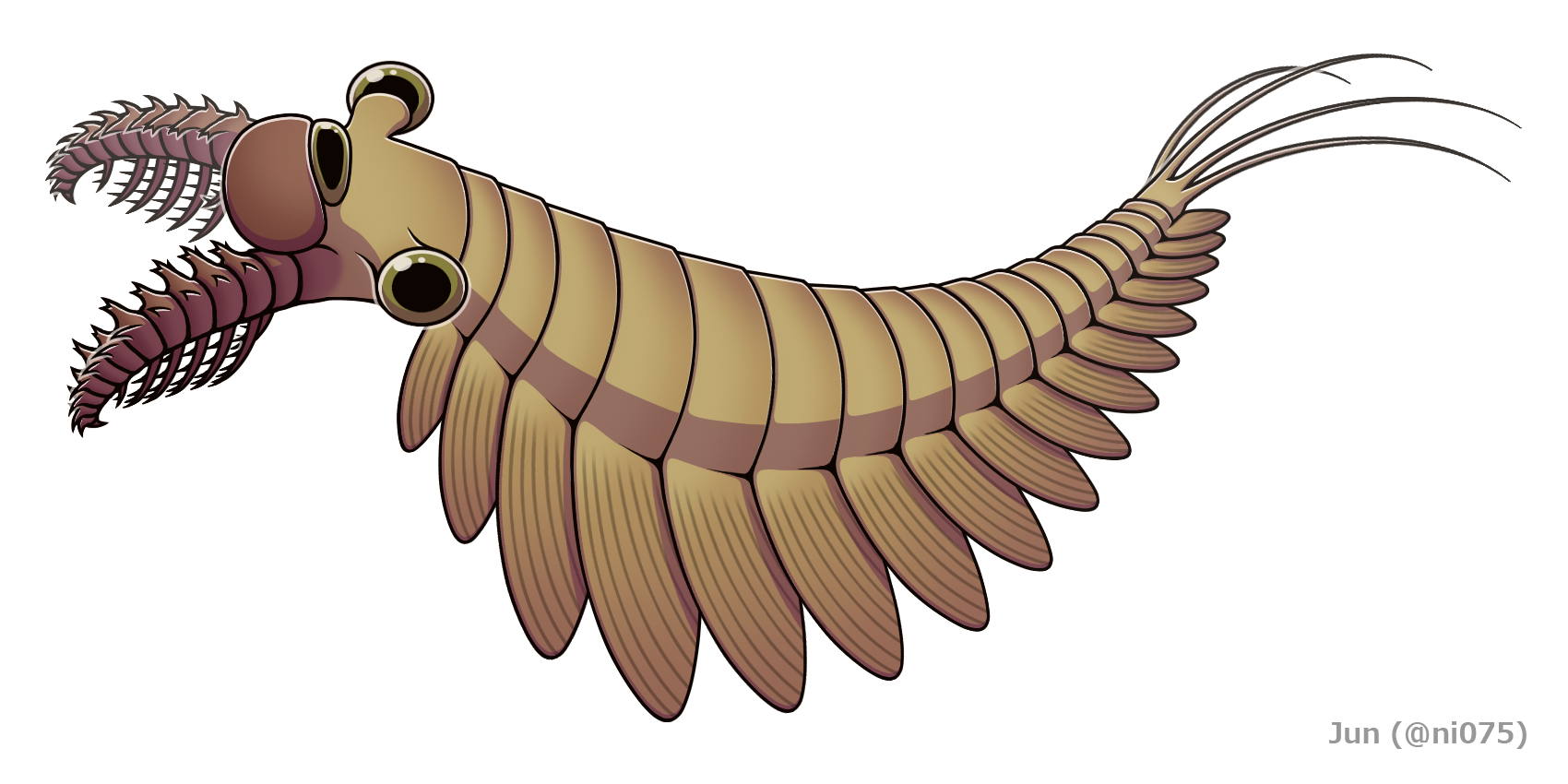
- Reconstruction of S. hirpex
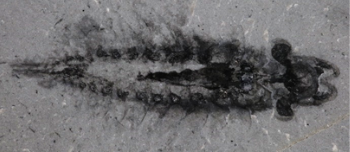
- Complete specimen of S. hirpex

Scientific classification
- Kingdom: Animalia
- Stem group: Arthropoda
- Class: †Dinocaridida
- Order: †Radiodonta
- Family: †Hurdiidae
- Genus: †Stanleycaris; Pates, Daley & Ortega-Hernández, 2018

Type species
- †Stanleycaris hirpex Pates, Daley & Ortega-Hernández, 2018

Species
- †S. hirpex Pates, Daley & Ortega-Hernández, 2018; †S. qingjiangensis Wu et al., 2024

= Stanleycaris =

Stanleycaris Temporal range: Cambrian Stage 3–Miaolingian

Extinct genus of basal hurdiid radiodonts

Stanleycaris ("Stanley's shrimp") is an extinct genus of hurdiid radiodont from the Cambrian (Stage 3 to Miaolingian). The type species is Stanleycaris hirpex. Stanleycaris was described from the Stephen Formation near the Stanley Glacier and Burgess Shale locality of Canada, as well as Wheeler Formation of United States. A second species, S. qingjiangensis, is known from the Qingjiang biota of China. The genus was characterized by the rake-like frontal appendages with robust inner spines.

== History of discovery ==
Stanleycaris was originally described only from frontal appendages and an oral cone. Its generic name means "Crab of Stanley Glacier"; hirpex, L. "large rake", reflects the rake-like nature of its spiny frontal appendages. However, in 2022, 268 specimens of Stanleycaris, many of which were complete, were studied, making Stanleycaris a well documented radiodont. Stanleycaris had three eyes, a bizarre configuration previously unknown among other radiodont genera; yet this head anatomy supports early differentiation among arthropod head and trunk segmentation.

The original description of the taxon appeared in an online supplement to the article published by Jean-Bernard Caron, Robert R. Gaines, M. Gabriela Mángano, Michael Streng and Allison C. Daley in 2010. That description did not satisfy of the requirements of the International Code of Zoological Nomenclature, as the Code did not accept taxa named in electronic publications as validly named until 2012; the name was eventually validated by Pates, Daley & Ortega-Hernández (2018).

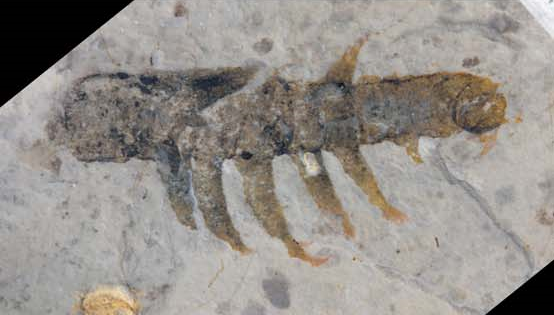
KUMIP 153923

The specimen KUMIP 153923 from the Cambrian Wheeler Formation (Utah, United States), which was described by Robison (1985) as a whole body of new lobopodian species Aysheaia prolata, was reinterpreted as an isolated frontal appendage of Stanleycaris sp. by Pates, Daley & Ortega-Hernández (2017). They reported segmental boundaries between the structures previously thought to be 'lobopods' and curved terminal spines that resemble the frontal appendages of radiodonts, and thus they considered A. prolata as a nomen dubium and synonymised it with Stanleycaris on the basis of their interpretation.

== Description ==
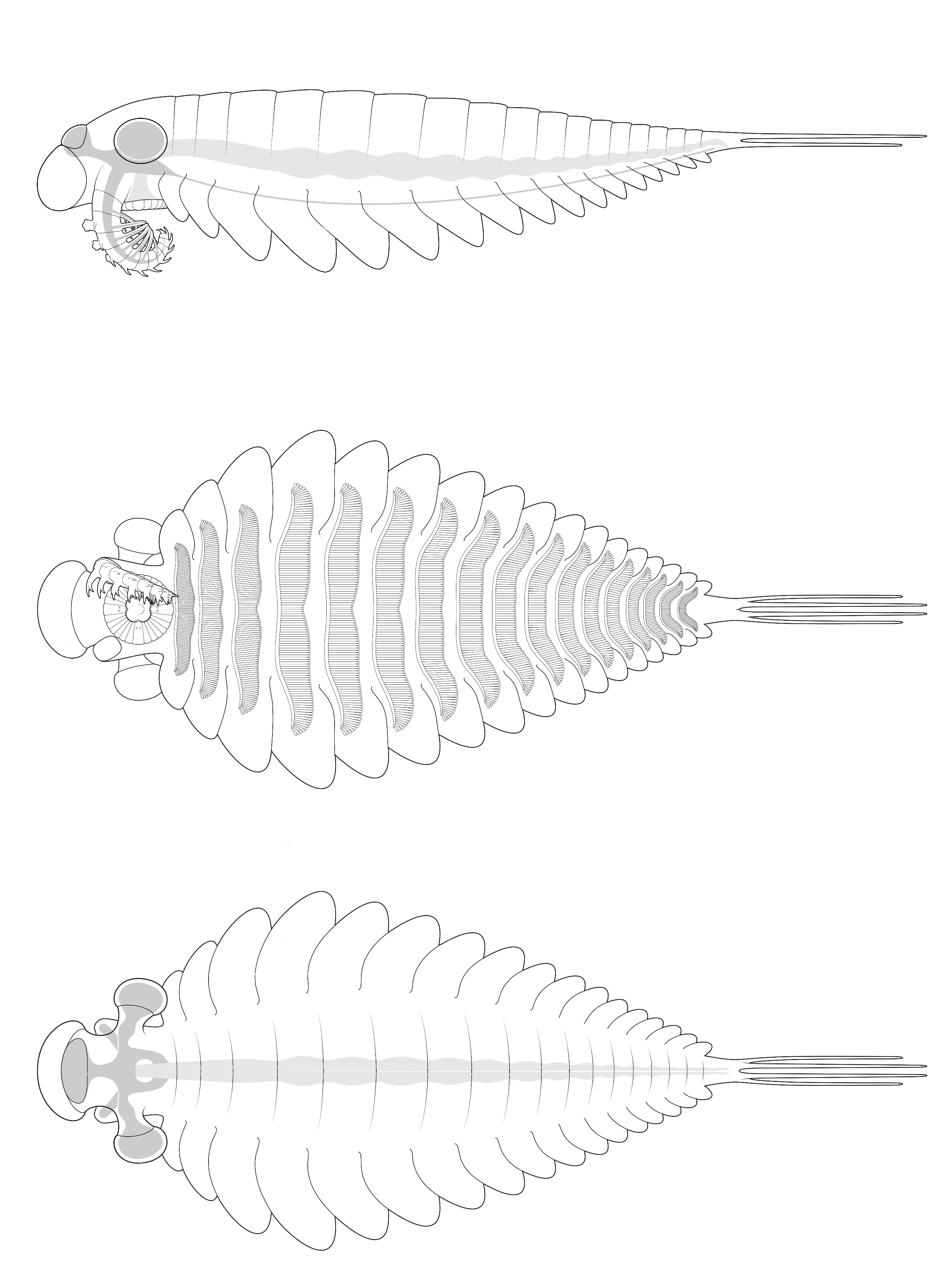
Diagrammatic reconstruction

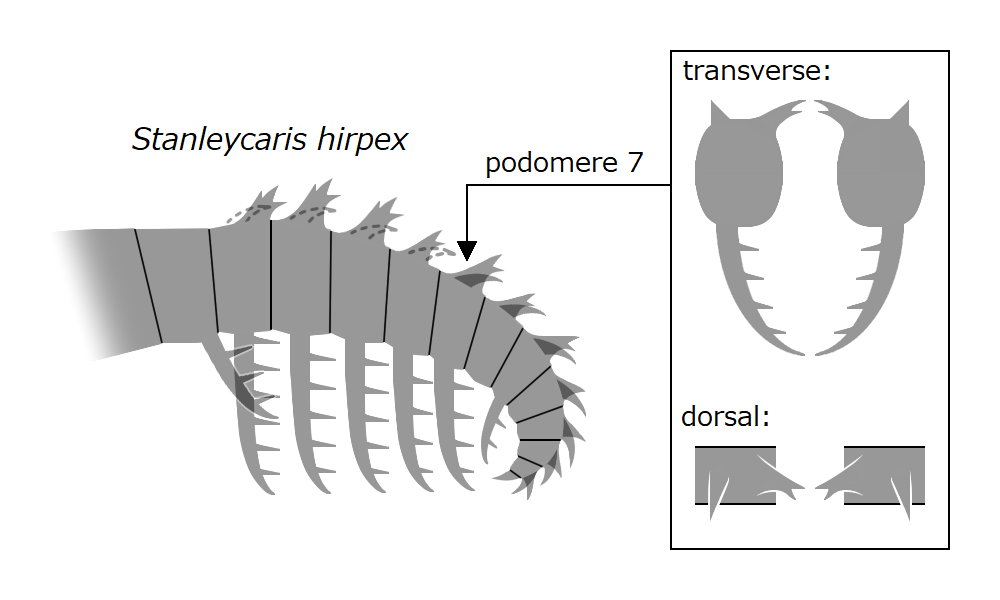
Diagram of frontal appendage of S. hirpex

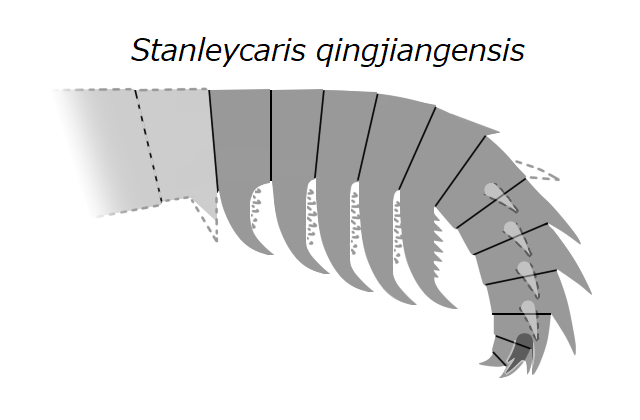
Reconstruction of frontal appendage of S. qinjiangensis

3D reconstruction of frontal appendages of S. hirpex

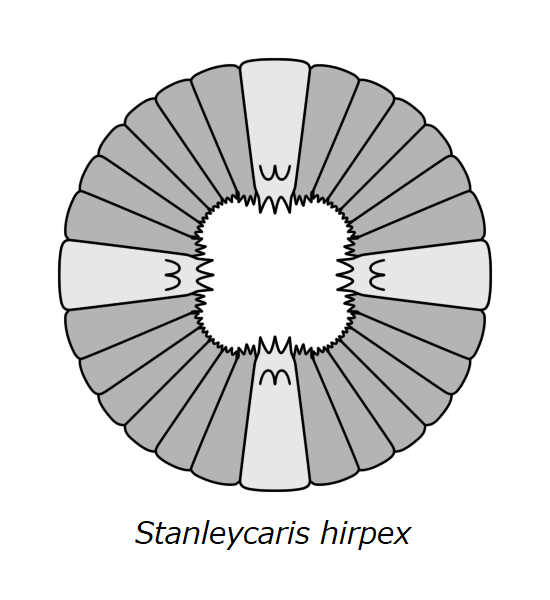
Oral cone

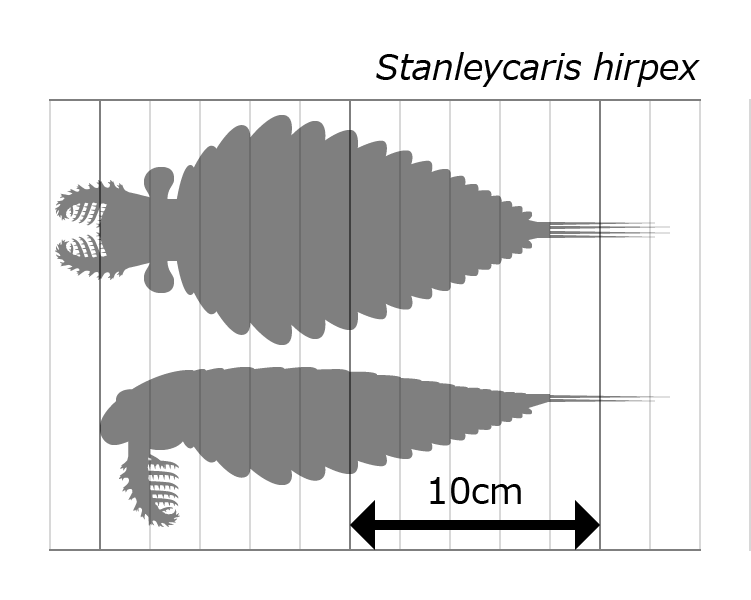
Size estimation

Stanleycaris was a small radiodont, with whole body specimen measured around 10–83 mm (0.39–3.27 in) long, excluding the tail. Even based on the largest isolated frontal appendage, the upper body length was thought to be less than 20 cm (7.9 in) long. Unlike most hurdiids with large head and broad neck region, the body of Stanleycaris was streamlined like those of anomalocaridids and amplectobeluids.

=== Head ===
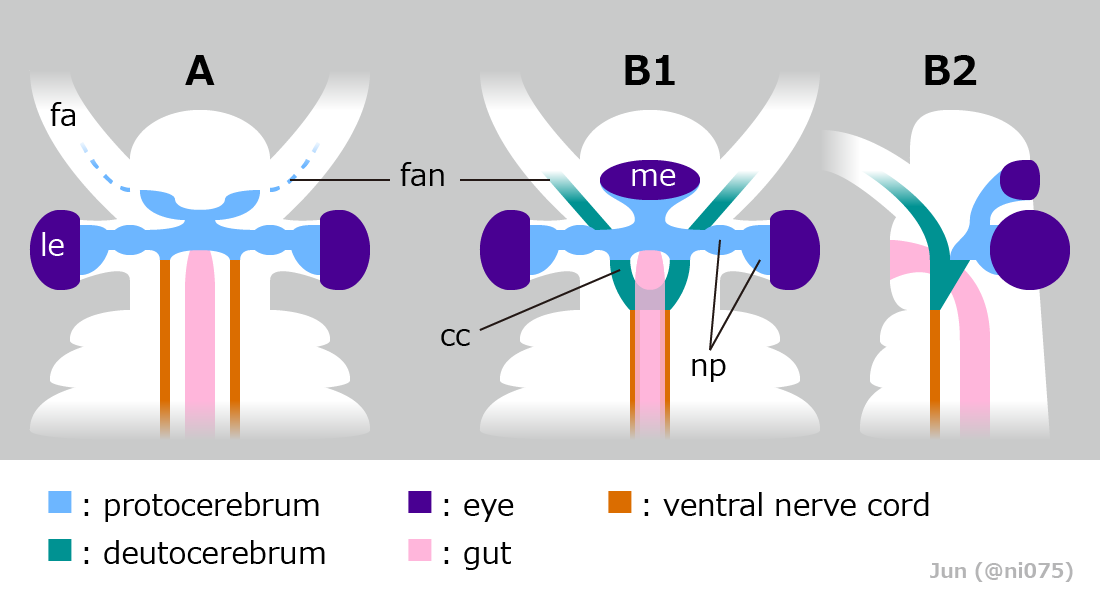
Interpretation of the brain and associated structures of radiodonts until 2014 (A), and after anatomy of Stanleycaris (B)

The small head occupies about 15% of the total body length. Each lateral compound eye was estimated to have around 1000 ommatidia. In addition of a pair of stalked lateral eyes, a third, large median eye was located behind its preocular sclerite (H-element). Similar structures were evident in the fossils of Peytoia and Lyrarapax, suggesting these genera possibly had a median eye too. Contrary to the agreement around mid and late 2010s (based on the discovery of Lyrarapax since 2014) suggest radiodonts had only protocerebrum on their cerebral ganglion, The neuroanatomical evidence of Stanleycaris suggests radiodonts have both protocerebrum and deutocerebrum, and circumesophageal connective that surround digestive system between them. Unlike other radiodonts, the paired lateral sclerites (P-element) are not evident in any Stanleycaris specimens, suggesting they were exclusively absent in this genus.

==== Frontal appendage ====
The frontal appendages, which are the most commonly found component of this taxon, range in length between 3.5–32.2 mm (0.14–1.27 in). It comprises 14 segments (podomeres) with 5 long, rake-like curved blades (endites) protruding from the ventral surface of podomere 3–7, while podomere 2 and 9 have short endites. The upper surface bore a row of inner-facing, mostly forked robust spines (gnathites) which are unique to this genus. Similar to Peytoia, the distal podomeres have claw-like dorsal and terminal spines.

==== Oral cone ====
The mouth was surrounded by a tetraradial oral cone, which comprises 28 tooth plates instead of 32 like those of other hurdiid genera. Each of the 4 large plate have 2 additional nodes, and the mouth opening has no additional inner plates.

=== Trunk region ===
The trunk region have 17 segments with paired lateroventral flaps, as well as 4 caudal filiform blades on the tail. The setal blades (band of gill lamellae) were suggested to be positioned ventrally on each of the trunk segment, contrary to the general reconstruction of radiodont with dorsal setal blades.

== Paleoecology ==
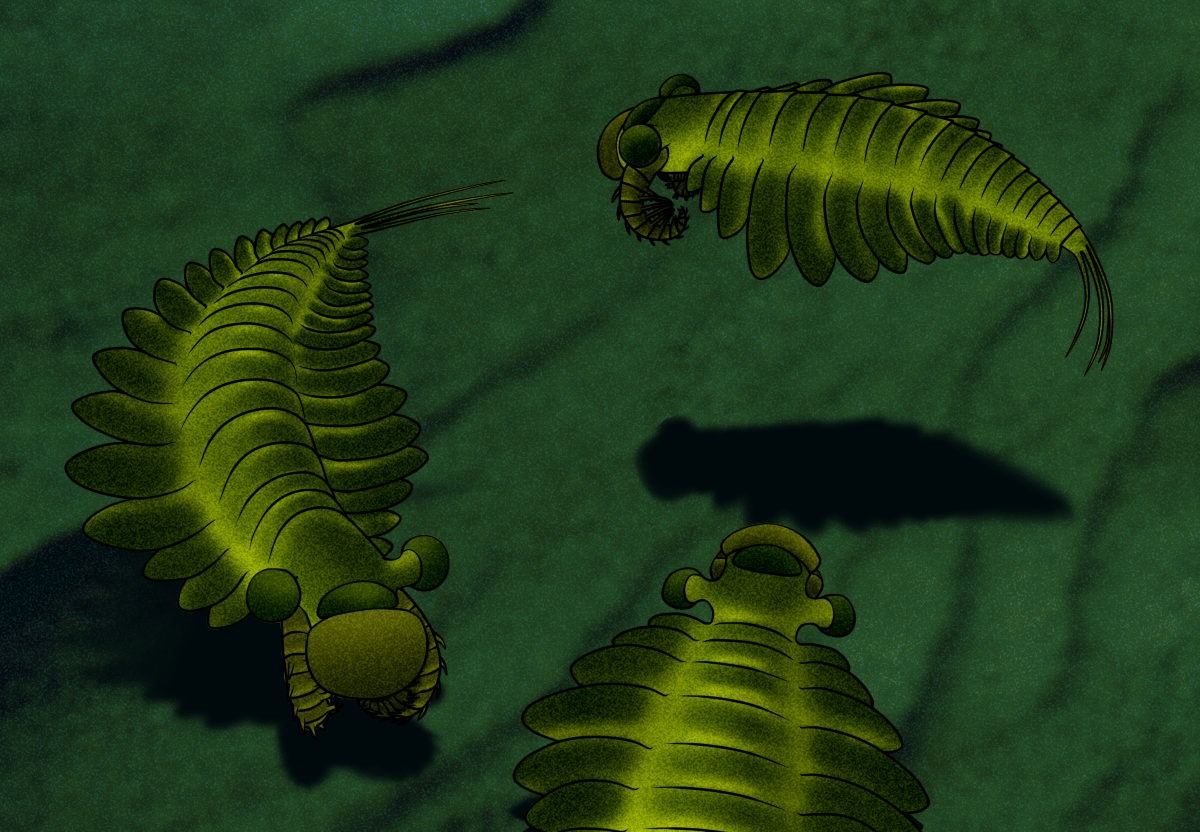
Life reconstruction of S. hirpex on seafloor

Stanleycaris was most likely a visual predator that specialized primarily on macroscopic, soft-bodied benthic prey. Based on its streamlined body shape and broad trunk flaps, it may have been able to chase relatively fast-moving prey. With strong differentiation of lateral–medial, inner–outer, and proximal–distal morphologies, Stanleycaris was probably able to manipulate prey with distal raptorial portion, trap and masticate prey items using endites and gnathites.

== Classification ==
Stanleycaris was analysed to be one of the basalmost hurdiid radiodont, alongside Peytoia and Schinderhannes which shares some anatomical similarities. This suggests that the anomalocaridid/amplectobeluid-like traits (e.g. streamlined body; small head sclerites; frontal appendages with curved dorsal spines) found in these hurdiids represent radiodont ancestral characters.

The following cladogram by Moysiuk & Caron (2022) demonstrates the phylogenetic position of Stanleycaris:

- Radiodonta
  - Tamisiocarididae
  - - Anomalocarididae
    - Amplectobeluidae
    - Hurdiidae
      - Stanleycaris
      - - Schinderhannes
        - - Peytoia
          - - Aegirocassis
            - - Hurdia
              - - Pahvantia
                - - Cambroraster
                  - Titanokorys
                  - Cordaticaris

== See also ==
- Paleobiota of the Burgess Shale
