= Cliff Mountain =

Cliff Mountain may refer to:

- Cliff Mountain (Alberta) in Jasper National Park, Alberta, Canada
- Cliff Mountain (British Columbia) in the British Columbia, Canada
- Cliff Mountain (Powell County, Montana), a mountain in Powell County, Montana
- Cliff Mountain (Flathead County, Montana), a mountain in Flathead County, Montana
- Cliff Mountain (New York)
- Cliff Mountain, a special biological area in the Laurel Fork conservation area), Scott County, Virginia
