= Burgess Shale =

Fossil-bearing rock formation in the Canadian Rockies

- Stratigraphic range: Miaolingian c.508–505 Ma
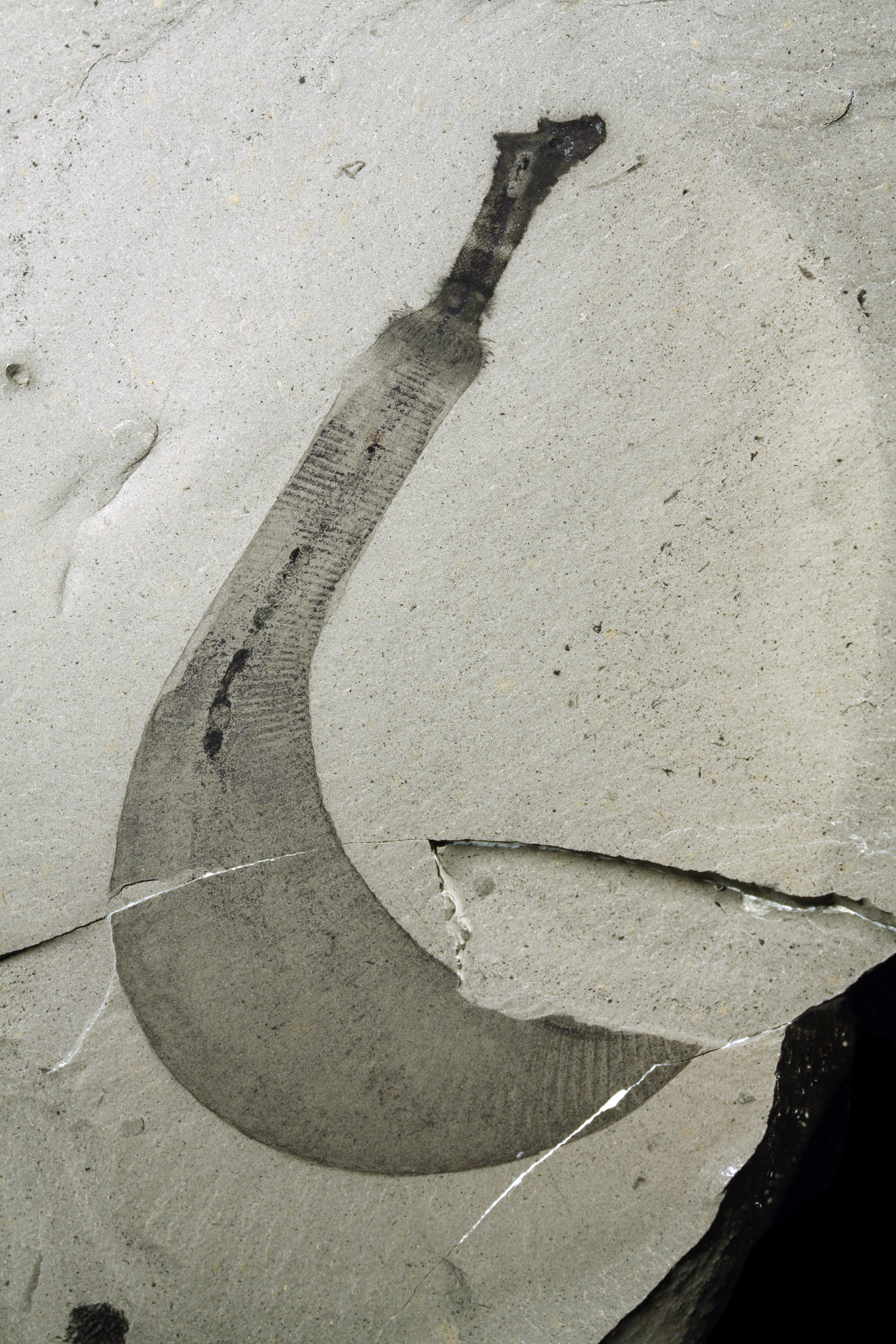
- Ottoia, a soft-bodied worm, abundant in the Burgess Shale. (From Smith et al. 2015)
- Type: Geological formation
- Unit of: Stephen Formation
- Thickness: 161 meters (528 ft)

Lithology
- Primary: Shale

Location
- Coordinates: 51°26′N 116°28′W
- Region: Yoho National Park and Kootenay National Park
- Country: Canada

Type section
- Named for: Burgess Pass
- Named by: Charles Doolittle Walcott, 1911
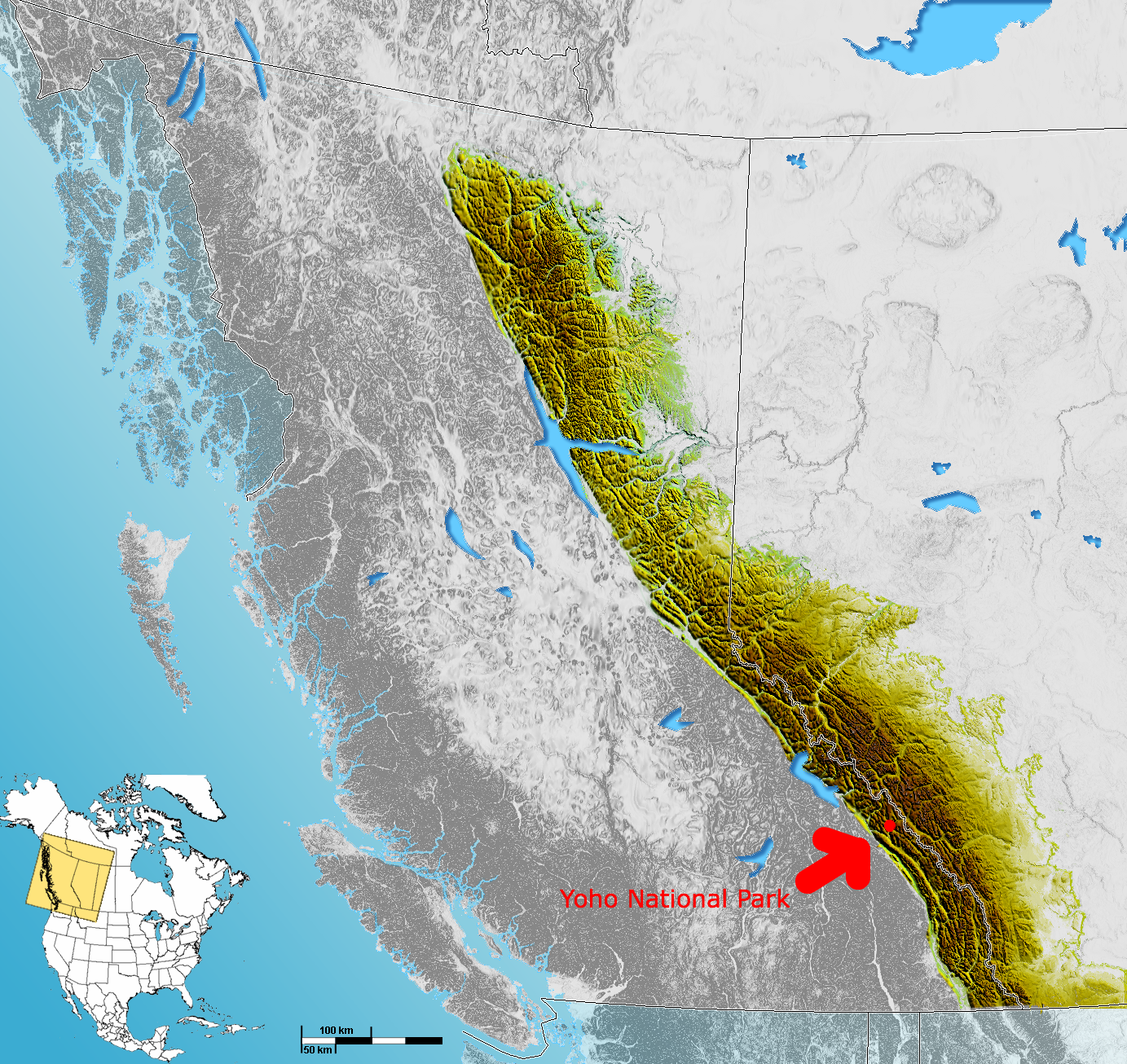
- Map highlighting Yoho National Park in red

The Burgess Shale is a fossil-bearing sedimentary rock unit exposed in the Canadian Rockies of British Columbia, Canada. Dating to the Middle Cambrian around 508 to 505 million years ago, it is famous for the exceptional preservation of soft-bodied fossils (making it a Lagerstätte), generally preserved as very thin dark carbonaceous films. The rock unit is a black shale and crops out at several localities near the town of Field in Yoho National Park and the Kicking Horse Pass. Another outcrop is in Kootenay National Park 42 km to the south. It is one of the best known Cambian Konservat-Lagerstätten, preserving a key record of the Cambrian explosion.

== History and significance ==
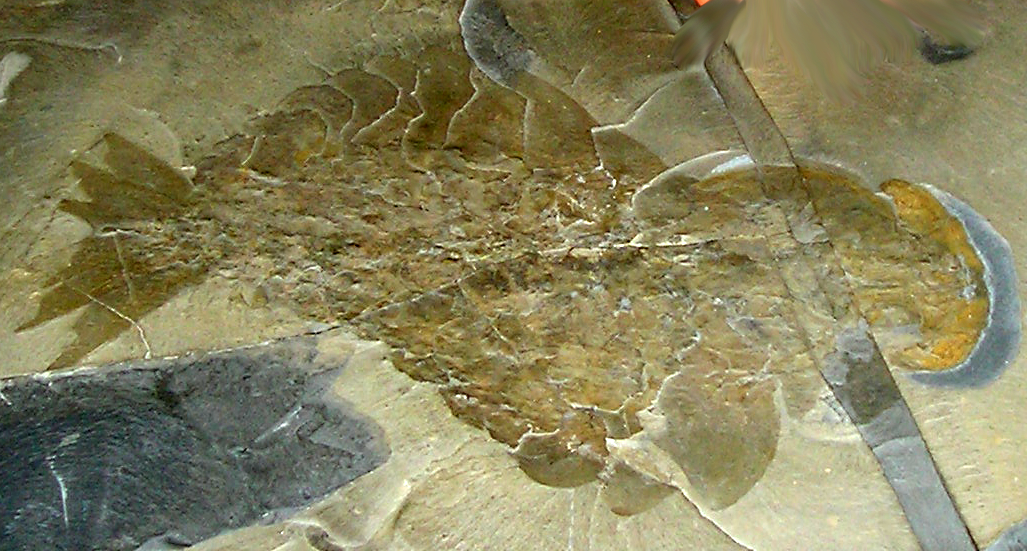
The first complete Anomalocaris fossil found.

The Burgess Shale was discovered by palaeontologist Charles Walcott on 30 August 1909, towards the end of the season's fieldwork. He returned in 1910 with his sons, daughter, and wife, establishing a quarry on the flanks of Fossil Ridge. The significance of soft-bodied preservation and the range of organisms he recognised as new to science led him to return to the quarry almost every year until 1924. At that point, aged 74, he had amassed over 65,000 specimens. Describing the fossils was a vast undertaking that Walcott pursued until he died in 1927. Walcott, led by scientific opinion at the time, attempted to categorise all fossils into living taxa, and as a result, the fossils were regarded as little more than curiosities at the time.

It was not until 1962 that Alberto Simonetta attempted a first-hand reinvestigation of the fossils. This led scientists to recognise that Walcott had barely scratched the surface of the information available in the Burgess Shale, and also made it clear that the organisms did not fit comfortably into modern groups.

Walcott's classifications of most of the fossils are now rejected, but were supported at the time, and he accepted a change for one of the few where his conclusion was disputed. Many of the later comments were made with the benefits of hindsight, and of techniques and concepts unknown in Walcott's time.

Excavations were resumed at the Walcott Quarry by the Geological Survey of Canada under the persuasion of trilobite expert Harry Blackmore Whittington. A new quarry, the Raymond, was established about 20 metres higher up Fossil Ridge. Whittington, with the help of research students Derek Briggs and Simon Conway Morris of the University of Cambridge, began a thorough reassessment of the Burgess Shale, and revealed that the fauna represented were much more diverse and unusual than Walcott had recognized. Many of the animals present had bizarre anatomical features and only the slightest resemblance to other known animals. Examples include Opabinia, with five eyes and a snout like a vacuum cleaner hose, and Hallucigenia, which was originally reconstructed upside down, walking on bilaterally symmetrical spines.

Parks Canada and UNESCO recognised the Burgess Shale as a UNESCO World Heritage Site, which led to stricter regulations and protections. This made collecting fossils politically more difficult from the mid-1970s. Collections continued to be made by the Royal Ontario Museum. The curator of invertebrate palaeontology, Desmond Collins, identified several additional outcrops, stratigraphically both higher and lower than the original Walcott quarry. These localities continue to yield new organisms faster than they can be studied.

Stephen Jay Gould's book Wonderful Life, published in 1989, brought the Burgess Shale fossils to the public's attention. Gould suggests that the extraordinary diversity of the fossils indicates that life forms at the time were much more disparate in body form than those that survive today, and that many of the unique lineages were evolutionary experiments that became extinct. Gould's interpretation of the diversity of Cambrian fauna relied heavily on Simon Conway Morris's reinterpretation of Charles Walcott's original publications. However, Conway Morris strongly disagreed with Gould's conclusions, arguing that almost all the Cambrian fauna could be classified into modern-day phyla.

The Burgess Shale has attracted the interest of paleoclimatologists who want to study and predict long-term future changes in Earth's climate. According to Peter Ward and Donald Brownlee in the 2003 book The Life and Death of Planet Earth, climatologists study the fossil records in the Burgess Shale to understand the climate of the Cambrian explosion. It can be used to predict what Earth's climate would look like 500 million years in the future as a warming and expanding Sun, combined with declining CO_{2} and oxygen levels, eventually heat the Earth toward temperatures not seen since the Archean Eon 3 billion years ago (before the first plants and animals appeared). This, in turn, furthers understanding of how and when the last living things on Earth could potentially die out. See also Future of the Earth.

After the Burgess Shale site was registered as a World Heritage Site in 1980, it was included in the Canadian Rocky Mountain Parks WHS designation in 1984.

In 2012, the discovery was announced of another Burgess Shale outcrop in Kootenay National Park to the south. In just 15 days of field collecting in 2013, 50 animal species were unearthed at the new site.

=== IUGS geological heritage site ===
In respect of the site being "characterized by exceptional soft-tissue preservation, [and containing] the most complete fossil record of Cambrian (Wuliuan) marine ecosystems", the International Union of Geological Sciences (IUGS) included the "Burgess Shale Cambrian Paleontological Record" in its assemblage of 100 "geological heritage sites" around the world in a listing published in October 2022. The organisation defines an "IUGS Geological Heritage Site" as "a key place with geological elements and/or processes of international scientific relevance, used as a reference, and/or with a substantial contribution to the development of geological sciences through history."

== Geology ==
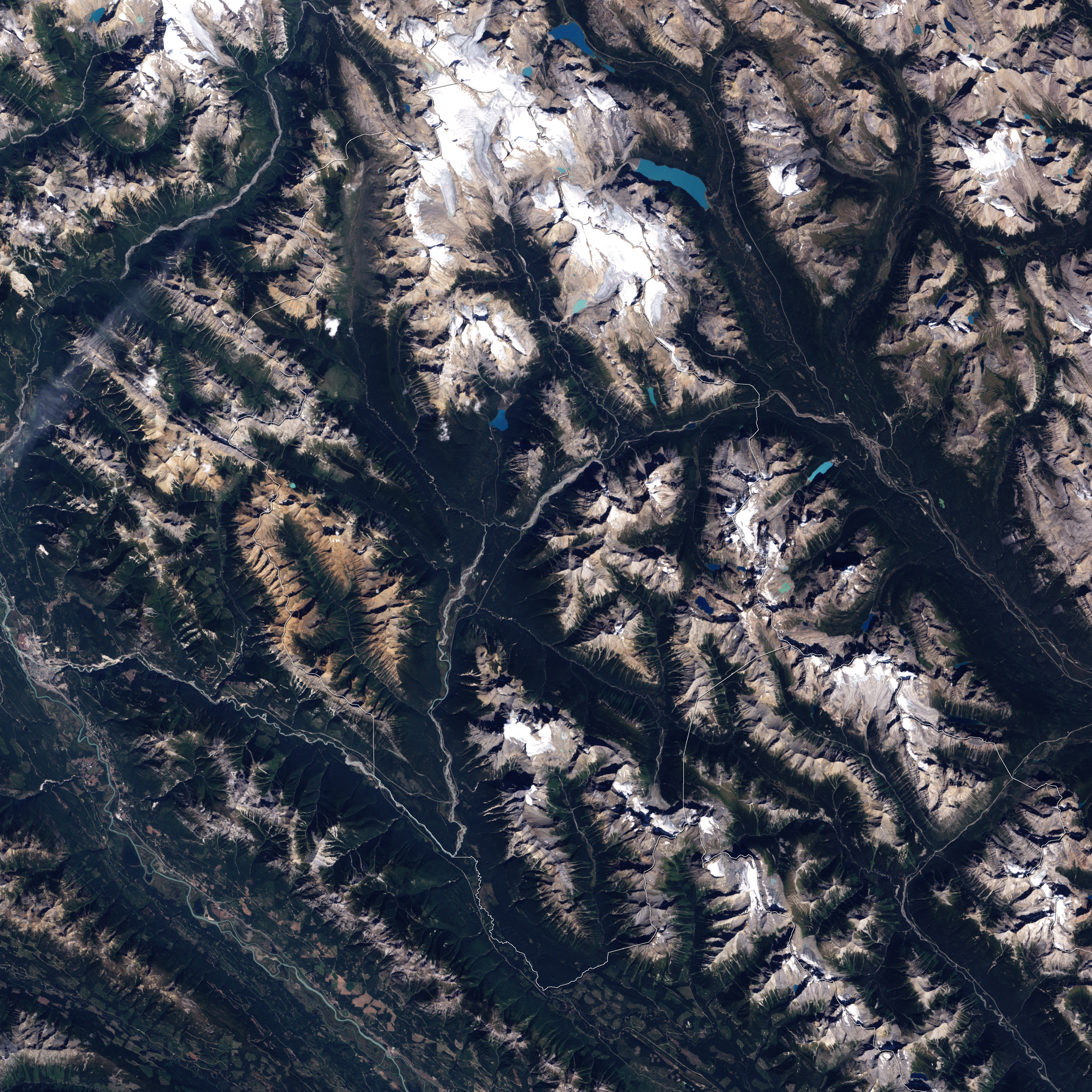
Satellite image of the area.

Map of the Burgess Shale (Stephen Formation), as well as the Mount Whyte Formation. Major Localities within the shale are shown.

Palaeogeographical context of the Burgess Shale and location relative to some other North American Cambrian lägerstatten

The fossil-bearing deposits of the Burgess Shale correlate to the Stephen Formation, a collection of slightly calcareous dark mudstones, about 505 million years old. The beds were deposited at the base of a cliff about 160 m tall, below the depth agitated by waves during storms. This vertical cliff was composed of the calcareous reefs of the Cathedral Formation, which probably formed shortly before the deposition of the Burgess Shale. The precise formation mechanism is not known for certain, but the most widely accepted hypothesis suggests that the edge of the Cathedral Formation reef became detached from the rest of the reef, slumping and being transported some distance – perhaps kilometers – away from the reef edge. Later reactivation of faults at the base of the formation led to its disintegration from about 509 million years ago. This would have left a steep cliff, the bottom of which would be protected from tectonic decompression because the limestone of the Cathedral Formation is difficult to compress. This protection explains why fossils preserved further from the Cathedral Formation are difficult to work with – tectonic squeezing of the beds has produced a vertical cleavage that fractures the rocks, causing them to split perpendicular to the fossils. The Walcott quarry produced such spectacular fossils because it was so close to the Stephen Formation – indeed, the quarry has now been excavated to the very edge of the Cambrian cliff.

It was originally thought that the Burgess Shale was deposited in anoxic conditions, but mounting research shows that oxygen was continually present in the sediment. The anoxic setting had been thought to not only protect the newly dead organisms from decay, but it also created chemical conditions allowing the preservation of the soft parts of the organisms. Furthermore, it reduced the abundance of burrowing organisms – burrows and trackways are found in beds containing soft-bodied organisms, but they are rare and generally of limited vertical extent. Brine seeps are an alternative hypothesis; see Burgess Shale type preservation for a more thorough discussion.

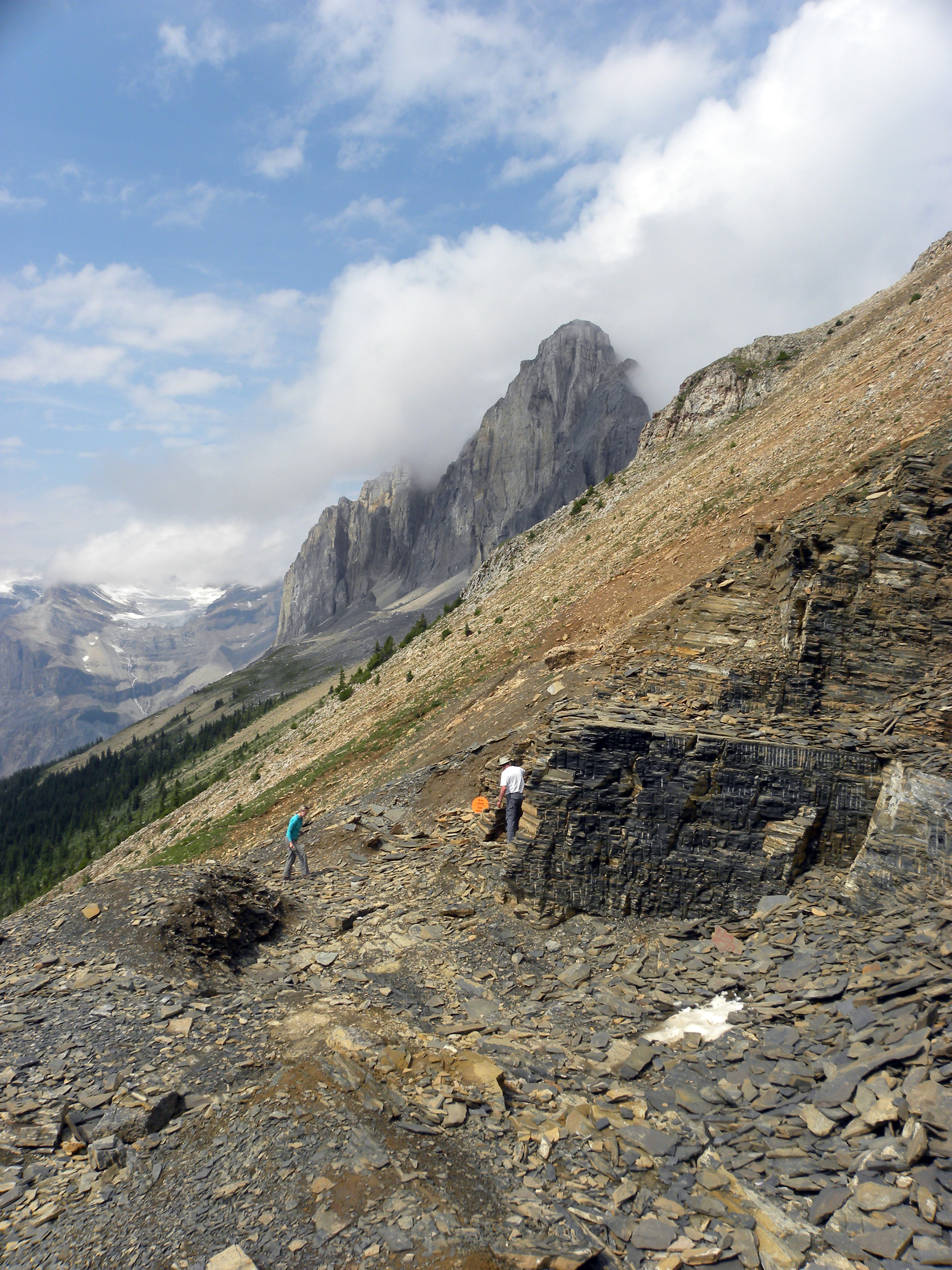
Walcott Quarry of the Burgess Shale showing the Walcott Quarry Shale Member. The white parallel vertical streaks are remnants of drill holes made during excavations in the mid-1990s.

The Burgess Shale is sometimes treated as a distinct formation as the Burgess Shale Formation, rather than just a part of the Stephen Formation.

== Taphonomy and diagenesis ==
The organisms that are found in the Burgess Shale are thought to have been rapidly entombed by sediment rich water current flows before they could have had a significant chance to decay. These currents may have transported the organisms relatively long distances before they were finally buried. The fossils are generally preserved as very thin (less than one micrometre/μm, or a thousandth of a milimetre, thick) carbonaceous films. Some soft-bodied fossils however preserve a level of relief, allowing additional details to be revealed via careful preparation of overlying layers of the fossil.

There are many other comparable Cambian Konservat-Lagerstätten; indeed, such assemblages are far more common in the Cambrian than in any other period. This is mainly due to the limited extent of burrowing activity; as such bioturbation became more prevalent throughout the Cambrian, and environments capable of preserving organisms' soft parts became much rarer. (The pre-Cambrian fossil record of animals is sparse and ambiguous, cf. Ediacaran biota.)

== Biota ==
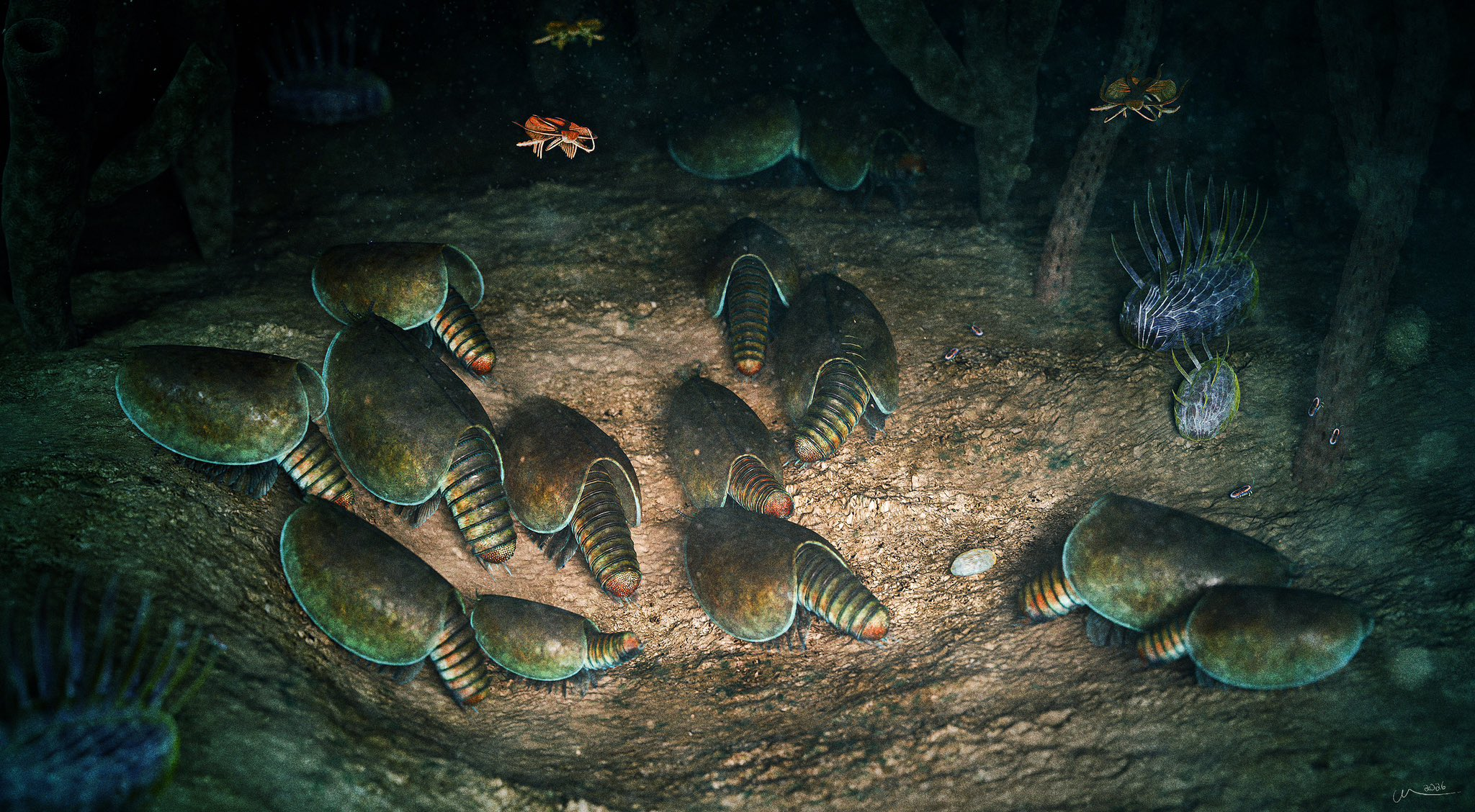
Artist's impression of the benthic environment of the site, showing Canadaspis perfecta gathering to mate and moult in the Walcott Quarry of the Burgess Shale (Phyllopod Bed, Layer -350), alongside other benthic animals like Wiwaxia, and the arthropod Marrella swimming above.

The biota of the Burgess Shale appears to be typical of middle Cambrian deposits. Although the hard-part bearing organisms make up as little as 14% of the community, these same organisms are found in similar proportions in other Cambrian localities. This means that there is no reason to assume that the organisms without hard parts are exceptional in any way; many appear in other lagerstätten of different age and locations.

The biota comprises a diverse range of organisms. Free-swimming (nectonic) organisms are relatively rare, with the majority of organisms being bottom-dwelling (benthic) — either moving about (vagrant) or permanently attached to the sea floor (sessile). About two-thirds of the Burgess Shale organisms lived by feeding on the organic content in the muddy sea floor, while almost a third filtered out fine particles from the water column. Under 10% of organisms were predators or scavengers, although since these organisms were larger, the biomass was split equally among the filter feeding, deposit feeding, predatory, and scavenging organisms.

Many Burgess Shale organisms represent stem group members of the modern animal phyla, though crown group representatives of certain phyla are also present.

== Working with the Burgess Shale ==
The fossils of the Burgess Shale are preserved as black carbon films on black shales, making them difficult to photograph; however, various photographic techniques can improve the quality of the images that can be acquired. Other techniques include backscatter SEM, elemental mapping and camera lucida drawing.

Once images have been acquired, the effects of decay and taphonomy must be accounted for before a correct anatomical reconstruction can be made. A consideration of the combination of characters allows researchers to establish the taxonomic affinity.

== See also ==
- Body plan
- Fezouata Formation, a fossil site in Morocco that helped bridge the gap of the Cambrian-Ordovician transition
- Castle Bank
- History of invertebrate paleozoology
- Invertebrate paleontology
- List of fossil sites (with link directory)
- Maotianshan Shales, which is often compared to Burgess Shale
- Paleobiota of the Burgess Shale
- Wheeler Shale, also compared to Burgess Shale
- List of arthropods of the Cambrian Period
