= Pika Formation =

Geologic formation in Canada

- Stratigraphic range: Middle Cambrian; ~509–500 Ma
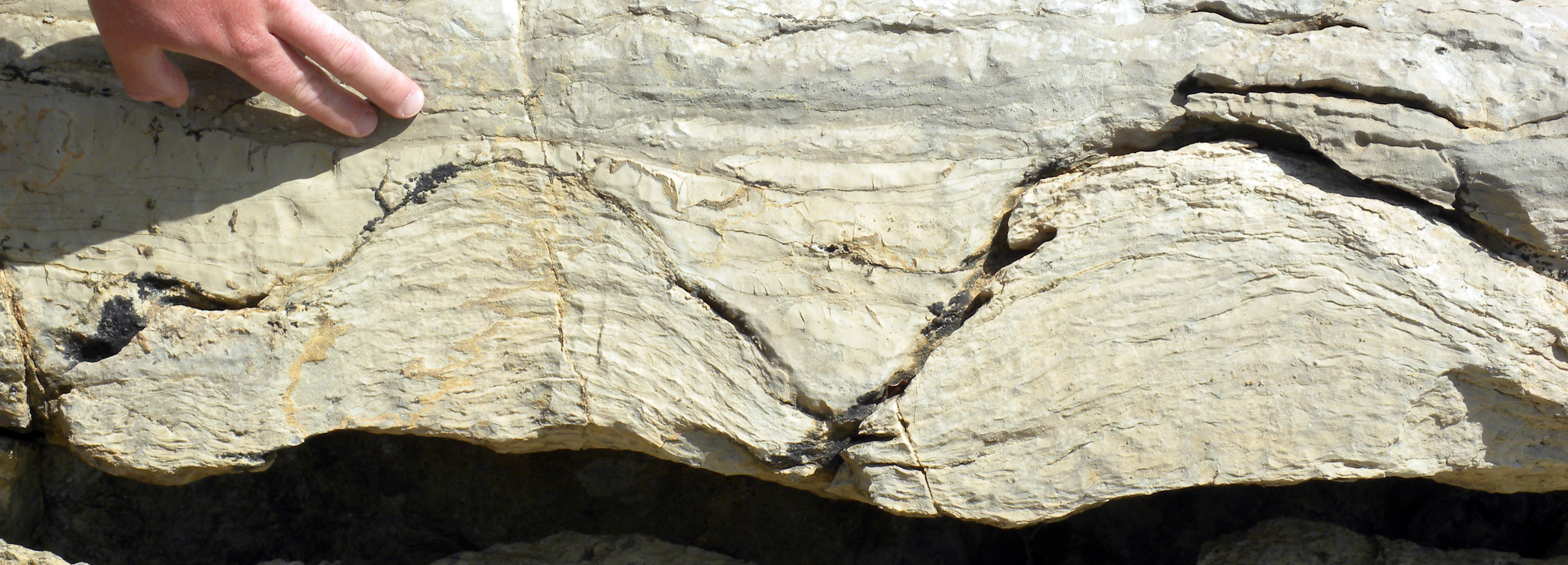
- Stromatolites in the Pika Formation near Helen Lake, Banff National Park, Canada
- Type: Formation
- Underlies: Arctomys Formation, Deadwood Formation, or Sullivan Formation
- Overlies: Eldon Formation, Titkana Formation, or Earlie Formation
- Thickness: Up to 361 metres (1,184 ft)

Lithology
- Primary: Calcareous mudstone
- Other: Limestone, dolomite

Location
- Coordinates: 51°29′40″N 116°06′05″W
- Region: Canadian Rockies
- Country: Canada

Type section
- Named for: Pika Peak
- Named by: C.F. Deiss, 1939

The Pika Formation is a stratigraphic unit of Middle Cambrian age that is present on the western edge of the Western Canada Sedimentary Basin in the Canadian Rockies of Alberta and British Columbia. It was named for Pika Peak near Lake Louise in Banff National Park by C.F. Deiss in 1939. It is fossiliferous and preserves several genera of trilobites. Outcrops of the Pika Formation can be seen in Banff and Jasper National Parks.

== Lithology and deposition ==
The Pika Formation consists primarily of dark-weathering, thin-bedded calcareous mudstone with thin dolomitized partings. There are minor intervals of shale near the base. The Pika was deposited in shallow marine environments along the western margin of the North American Craton during Middle Cambrian time.

== Distribution and stratigraphic relationships ==
The Pika Formation is present in the Rocky Mountains of Alberta and British Columbia, from south of Mount Assiniboine to the Kakwa area in the north. It thickens westward, reaching a maximum thickness of about 361 metres (1,184 feet) near the Chaba River, and thins to zero in the subsurface of the Alberta plains. It is in gradational contact with the underlying Eldon Formation in the south, Titkana Formation in the north, and the Earlie Formation in the east. In the mountains it is overlain by the Arctomys Formation; the contact is abrupt and may be unconformable. In the plains to the east it is unconformably overlain by the Sullivan Formation or, farther east, by the Deadwood Formation.
