= Eldon Formation =

Geologic formation in Canada

- Stratigraphic range: Middle Cambrian; ~509–500 Ma
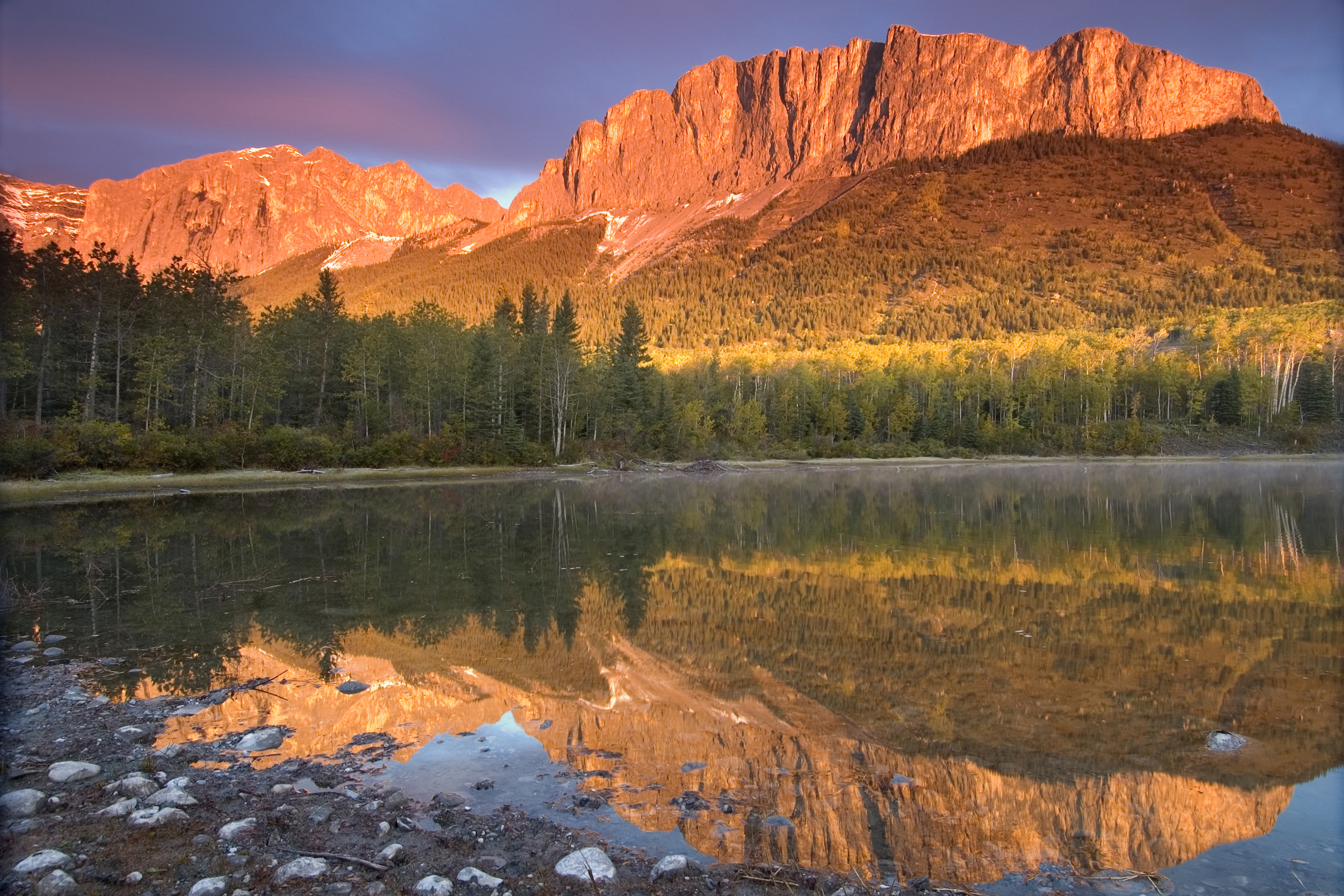
- The Eldon Formation forms the cliffs of Mount Yamnuska in Alberta
- Type: Formation
- Underlies: Pika Formation
- Overlies: Stephen Formation, Snake Indian Formation
- Thickness: Up to 500 metres (1640 ft)

Lithology
- Primary: Limestone, dolomite
- Other: Mudstone

Location
- Coordinates: 51°18′8.5″N 115°55′45″W
- Region: Canadian Rockies
- Country: Canada

Type section
- Named for: Eldon Switch on the Canadian Pacific Railway in Banff National Park, Alberta
- Named by: Charles Doolittle Walcott in 1908

The Eldon Formation is a stratigraphic unit that is present on the western edge of the Western Canada Sedimentary Basin in the southern Canadian Rockies of southwestern Alberta and southeastern British Columbia. It is a thick sequence of massive, cliff-forming limestones and dolomites that was named for Eldon Switch on the Canadian Pacific Railway near Castle Mountain in Banff National Park by Charles Doolittle Walcott, who discovered the Burgess Shale fossils. The Eldon Formation was deposited during Middle Cambrian time, and it includes fossil stromatolites. The Eldon forms the scenic cliffs at the top of Castle Mountain, and can also be seen at Mount Yamnuska and other mountains in Banff and Yoho National Parks.

== Lithology and deposition ==
The Eldon Formation is a thick sequence of cliff-forming carbonate rocks that was deposited during the Middle Cambrian time. It originally formed as limestone and calcareous mudstone in the intertidal to supratidal zone along the western margin of the North American Craton. It was subsequently altered to dolomite and dolomitic mudstone in some areas.

== Distribution and stratigraphic relationships ==
The Eldon Formation is present in the southern Rocky Mountains of southwestern Alberta and southeastern British Columbia. It reaches a maximum thickness of about 500 metres (1,640 feet) at Mount Bosworth on the Alberta-British Columbia border. The Eldon conformably overlies the Stephen Formation, which hosts the fossils of the Burgess Shale, in the south, and the Snake Indian Formation in the north. It is conformably overlain by the Pika Formation. The Eldon grades into the Earlie Formation to the east, the Chancellor Formation to the west, and the Titkana Formation to the north. It is probably equivalent to the Windsor Mountain Formation to the south.
