= Mount John Laurie =

Mountain in Alberta, Canada

- Îyâmnathka, Mount Yamnuska
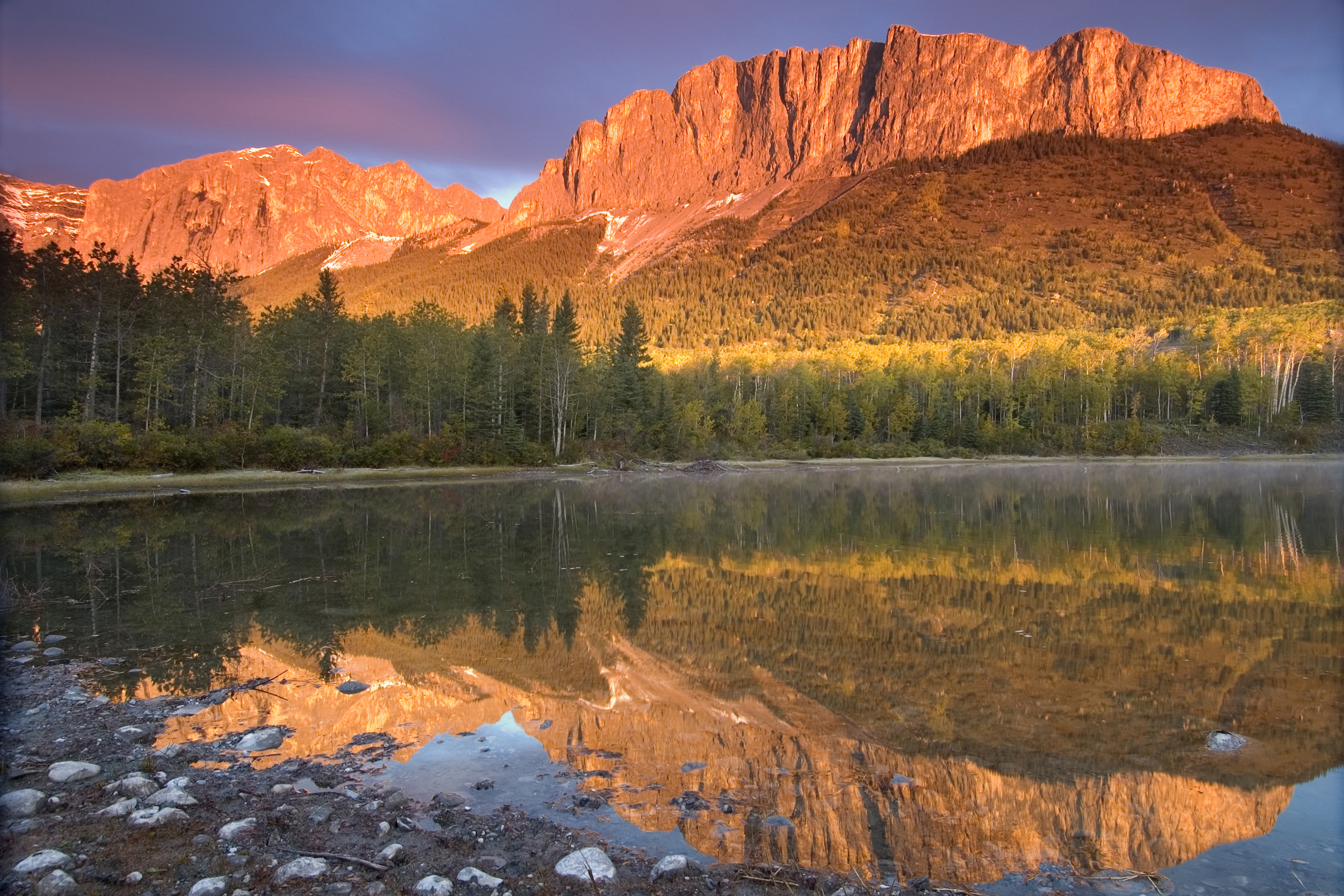
- Yamnuska

Highest point
- Elevation: 2,240 m (7,350 ft)
- Listing: Mountains of Alberta
- Coordinates: 51°07′27″N 115°07′06″W

Geography
- Location within Alberta
- Country: Canada
- Province: Alberta
- District: Municipal District of Bighorn No. 8
- Parent range: Canadian Rockies
- Topo map: NTS 82O3 Canmore

Geology
- Rock age: Paleozoic
- Mountain type(s): Limestone and shale

Climbing
- First ascent: Unknown
- Easiest route: Scramble

Mount John Laurie is a mountain in the Canadian Rockies, in Alberta's Municipal District of Bighorn No. 8.

== Various names ==
Officially named Mount John Laurie in 1961, it is also known as Mount Laurie, or by its original Stoney Nakoda name Îyâmnathka, borrowed into English as Mount Yamnuska or simply Yamnuska. Îyâmnathka is a compound that includes root words meaning "mountain" and "flat", however it is usually translated more figuratively as "flat-faced mountain".

John Lee Laurie, 1899–1959, was a founder of the Indian Association of Alberta. The mountain's 1961 renaming came at the request of the Stoney Nakoda First Nation. Laurie, an educator and political activist, served as secretary of the Indian Association of Alberta from 1944 to 1956, promoting the causes of First Nations in Alberta.

== Peak and climbing ==
Standing at approximately 2,240 m (7,350 ft) above sea level, Mount John Laurie is the last mountain on the north side of the Bow River valley (Bow Valley) as it exits the mountains for the foothills and prairie of Alberta. Located close to Calgary, it is a popular "great scramble". It is also a popular rock climbing destination, with over 100 routes of all difficulty levels spread out across its face.

== Geology ==
Mount John Laurie is the result of the McConnell Thrust Fault, which put the resistive, cliff-forming Cambrian carbonate rock of the Eldon Formation on top of the much younger and weaker Cretaceous-aged clastic Belly River Formation The fault, which sits at the base of the cliff face, represents an age difference of around 450 million years.

== Spirituality ==
In 1987 Mount John Laurie was listed into a global network of natural spiritual places, which also included Mount Fuji in Japan, Stonehenge, Mount Shasta, Machu Picchu in Peru, Australia's Uluru, and the pyramids of the Yucatán.
