= Earlie Formation =

Geologic formation in Canada

- Stratigraphic range: Upper Wuliuan
- Type: Formation
- Underlies: Pika Formation, Deadwood Formation
- Overlies: Basal sandstone unit
- Thickness: Up to 172 metres (565 ft)

Lithology
- Primary: Siltstone, sandstone, shale

Location
- Coordinates: 53°10′49″N 110°25′47″W
- Region: Canadian Rockies
- Country: Canada

Type section
- Named for: Earlie Lake, Alberta
- Named by: D.C. Pugh

The Earlie Formation is a stratigraphic unit of Middle Cambrian age in the Western Canada Sedimentary Basin that is present beneath the plains of Alberta and eastern Saskatchewan. It was named for Earlie Lake in the County of Vermilion River, Alberta, by D.C. Pugh in 1971, who described the type section based on data from an oil well drilled in that area.

== Lithology ==
The Earlie Formation consists of interbedded glauconitic siltstones and fine-grained sandstones and shales. The presence of glauconite indicates that the sediments were deposited in a marine environment.

== Deposition and stratigraphic relationships ==
The Earlie Formation underlies the plains of Alberta and eastern Saskatchewan. It rests conformably on the unnamed basal sandstone unit that was deposited on the Precambrian rocks of the North American Craton at the start of a marine transgression of that area. It is overlain by the Pika Formation or, in areas where the Pika is not present, by the Deadwood Formation. It thickens to the west where it grades into the Mount Whyte, Cathedral, Stephen, and lower Pika Formations; the upper Eldon formation is age-equivalent. It thins eastward to zero in Saskatchewan.

Trilobite biostratigraphy supports an age in the upper Wuliuan (Ehmaniella Zone, lower to upper Altiocculus subzone)
