= Naiset Formation =

Geologic formation in British Columbia, Canada

- Stratigraphic range: Middle Cambrian; ~509–500 Ma
- Type: Formation
- Underlies: Cathedral Formation
- Overlies: Gog Group
- Thickness: Up to about 212 m (695 feet)

Lithology
- Primary: Shale, siltstone
- Other: Sandstone, conglomerate, limestone

Location
- Coordinates: 50°53′45″N 115°39′00″W
- Region: British Columbia
- Country: Canada

Type section
- Named for: Naiset Point
- Named by: C.E. Deiss, 1940

The Naiset Formation is a stratigraphic unit of Middle Cambrian age. It is present on the western edge of the Western Canada Sedimentary Basin in the southern Rocky Mountains of British Columbia. It consists primarily of siliciclastic rocks, and was named for Naiset Point near Mount Assiniboine by C.E. Deiss in 1940.

== Thickness and lithology ==
The Naiset Formation ranges in thickness from about 100 to 212 m (328 to 695 ft), and was deposited in a deep-water marine environment. It consists primarily of thin-bedded shale and siltstone. There are minor beds of sandstone, conglomerate, and calcareous mudstone at the base, and minor beds of oolitic and oncolitic limestone near the top.

== Distribution and relationship to other units ==
The Naiset Formation is present in Rocky Mountains of southeastern British Columbia. It unconformably overlies the Gog Group. It is overlain by the Cathedral Formation, and the contact is gradational. Equivalent strata to the east of the Kicking Horse area are assigned to the Mount Whyte Formation.
