= Arctomys Formation =

Geologic formation in Canada

- Stratigraphic range: Middle Cambrian; ~509–500 Ma
- Type: Formation
- Underlies: Waterfowl Formation
- Overlies: Pika Formation
- Thickness: Up to 336 metres (1,100 ft)

Lithology
- Primary: Shale
- Other: Dolomite, limestone

Location
- Coordinates: 51°57′35″N 116°55′16″W
- Region: Canadian Rockies
- Country: Canada

Type section
- Named for: Arctomys Peak
- Named by: Charles Doolittle Walcott

The Arctomys Formation is a stratigraphic unit of late Middle Cambrian age. It is present on the western edge of the Western Canada Sedimentary Basin in the Canadian Rockies of Alberta and British Columbia. It was named for Arctomys Peak near Mount Erasmus in Banff National Park by Charles Doolittle Walcott in 1920. Outcrops of the Arctomys can be seen in Banff and Jasper National Parks.

== Lithology and deposition ==
The Arctomys was deposited along the western shoreline of the North American Craton during late Middle Cambrian time. It consists primarily of red, grey, and green platy shale. Sedimentary structures include mudcracks, ripple marks, and casts of salt crystals. Environments of deposition may have included shallow lakes, lagoons, and sheet-flood deposits on dry mud flats.

== Distribution and stratigraphic relationships ==
The Arctomys Formation is present in the Rocky Mountains of Alberta and British Columbia. It thickens northward from White Man Mountain to a maximum of 336 metres (1,100 ft) at Mount Robson. It is overlies the Pika Formation and is overlain by the Waterfowl Formation. Both contacts are gradational.
