= Chetamon Mountain =

Mountain in Alberta, Canada

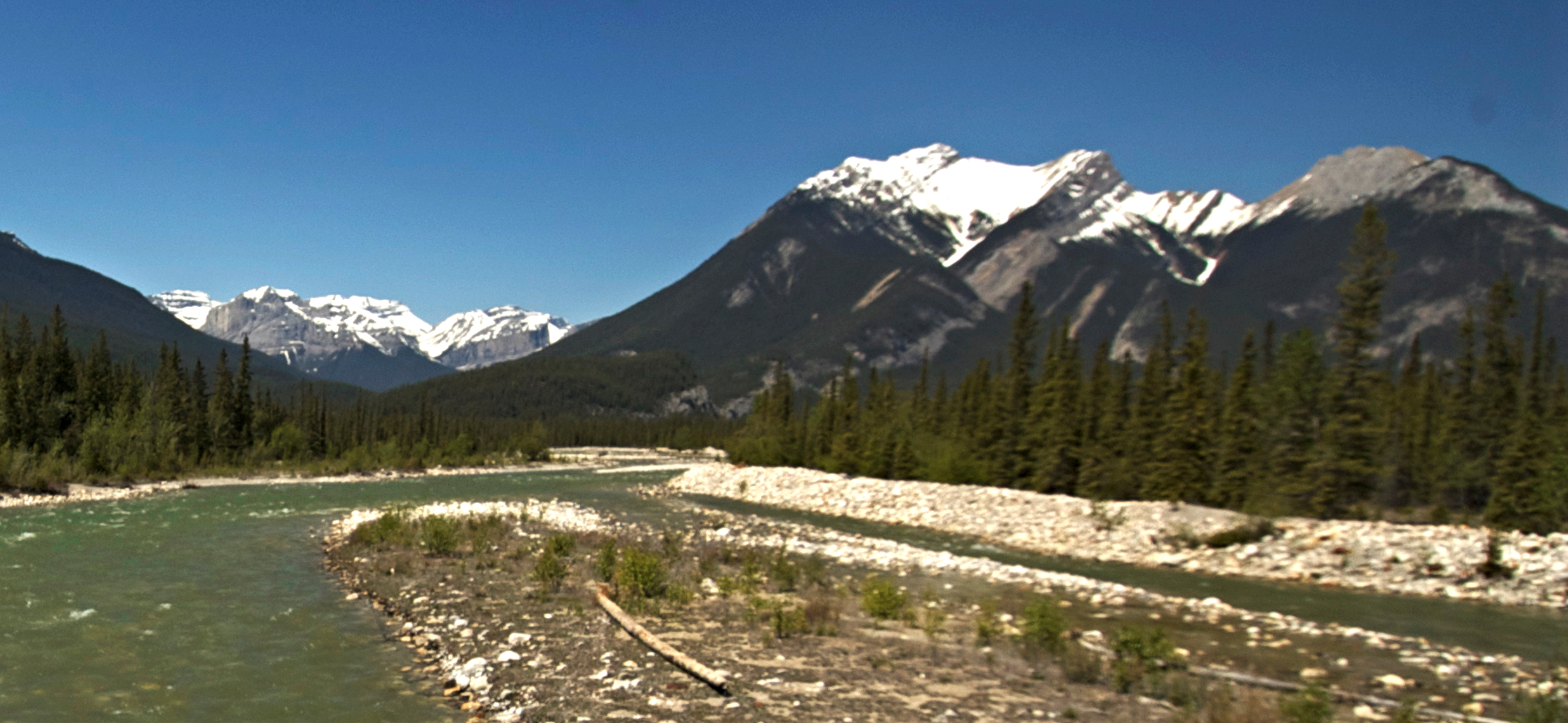
- Chetamon Mountain and Snaring River seen from the snaring road bridge

Highest point
- Elevation: 2,606 m (8,550 ft)
- Prominence: 122 m (400 ft)
- Parent peak: Cliff Mountain (2763 m)
- Listing: Mountains of Alberta
- Coordinates: 53°03′07″N 118°11′57″W

Geography
- Location within Alberta Location within Canada
- Country: Canada
- Province: Alberta
- Protected area: Jasper National Park
- Parent range: De Smet Range; Canadian Rockies
- Topo map: NTS 83E1 Snaring River

Geology
- Rock type: sedimentary rock

Chetamon Mountain is a 2,606-metre (8,550-foot) mountain summit located in Jasper National Park, in the De Smet Range of the Canadian Rockies in Alberta, Canada. The peak is situated 18 kilometres (11 mi) north of the municipality of Jasper, in the Athabasca Valley and is visible from Highway 16 and the Canadian. Its nearest higher peak is Cliff Mountain, 3.5 km (2.2 mi) to the northwest.

Chetamon Mountain is a name derived from the Stoney language meaning "squirrel". The mountain was named in 1916 by Morrison P. Bridgland because two rocks on the peak's arête had the appearance of a squirrel. Bridgland (1878-1948) was a Dominion Land Surveyor who named many peaks in Jasper Park and the Canadian Rockies. The mountain's name was officially adopted in 1956 by the Geographical Names Board of Canada.

== Climate ==
Based on the Köppen climate classification, Chetamon Mountain is located in a subarctic climate with cold, snowy winters, and mild summers. Temperatures can drop below -20 °C with wind chill factors below -30 °C. In terms of favorable weather, June through September are the best months to climb. Precipitation runoff from Chetamon Mountain flows into the Athabasca River via the Snaring River and Cobblestone Creek.

== Gallery ==
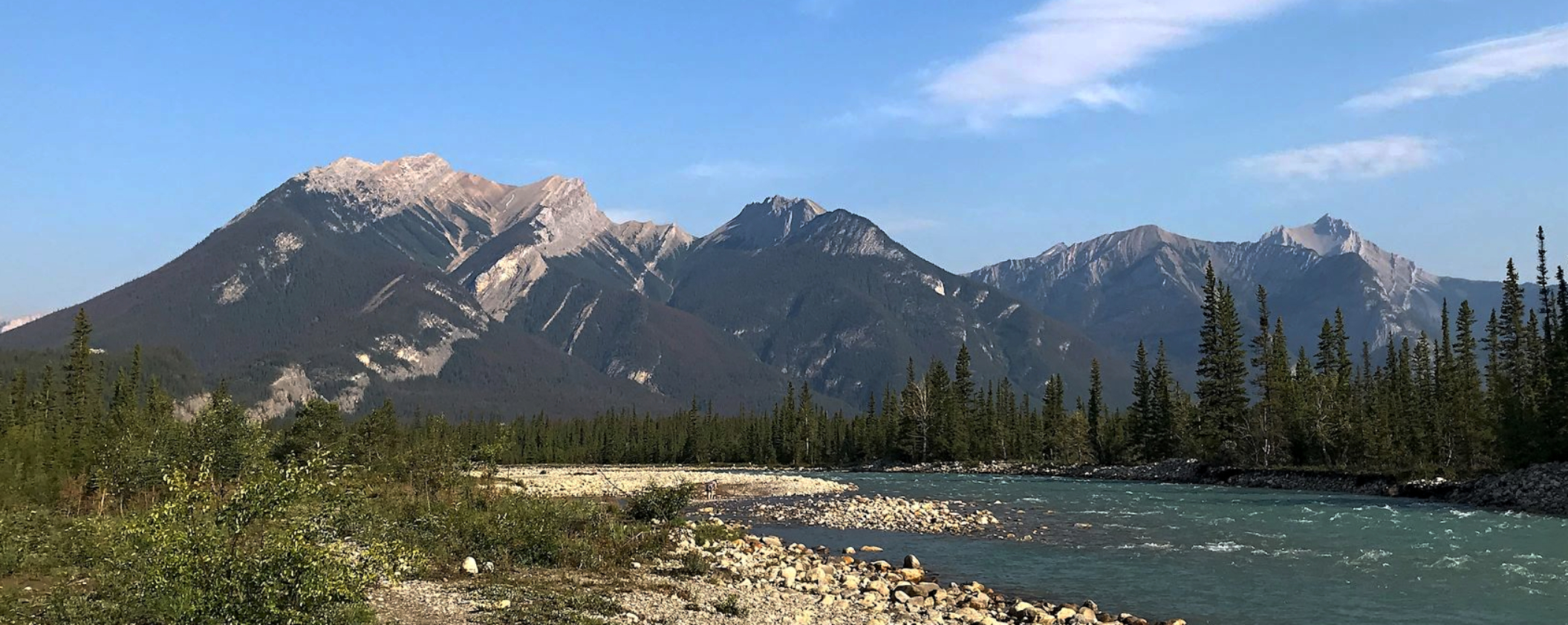
Chetamon Mountain (left), Esplanade Mountain and Gargoyle Mountain seen from Snaring River

== See also ==
- Geography of Alberta
