= Deadwood Formation =

Geologic formation of the Williston Basin and Western Canada Sedimentary Basin

- Stratigraphic range: Late Cambrian-Early Ordovician; ~510–470 Ma
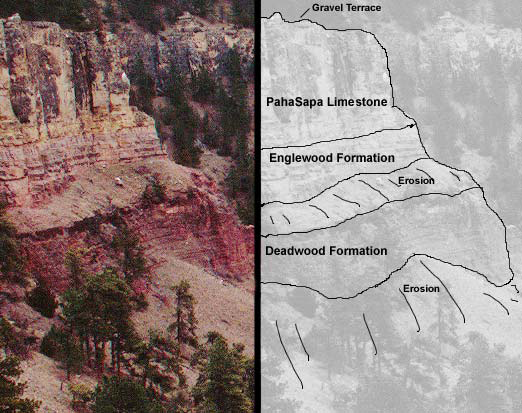
- The Deadwood Formation at Fallingrock cliff in Dark Canyon in the Black Hills, South Dakota
- Type: Formation
- Underlies: Red River, Winnipeg & Englewood Formations & Elk Point Group
- Overlies: Precambrian rocks, or Lebold Formations Earlie and Pika Formations

Lithology
- Primary: Sandstone
- Other: Conglomerate, shale, limestone

Location
- Region: Williston Basin and Western Canada Sedimentary Basin
- Country: United States; Canada

Type section
- Named for: Deadwood, South Dakota
- Named by: Darton, N.H. and Paige, S. (1925)

The Deadwood Formation is a geologic formation of the Williston Basin and Western Canada Sedimentary Basin. It is present in parts of North and South Dakota and Montana in the United States, and in parts of Alberta, Saskatchewan, and southwestern corner of Manitoba in Canada. It is of Late Cambrian to Early Ordovician age and was named for exposures in Whitewood Creek near Deadwood, South Dakota. It is a significant aquifer in some areas, and its conglomerates yielded significant quantities of gold in the Black Hills of South Dakota.

It preserves trace fossils such as Skolithos, and remains of Late Cambrian trilobites and brachiopods, as well as Ordovician fossils.

A 20 MW geothermal power plant is under construction, drilling 3.5 kilometers down.

== Stratigraphic position ==
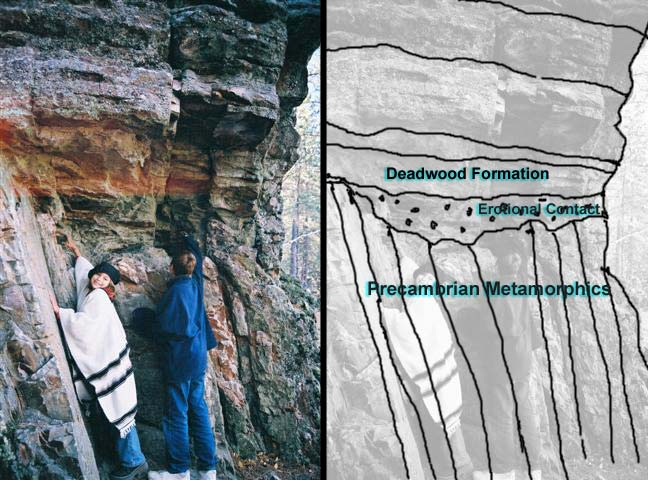
The angular unconformity between the Deadwood Formation and the underlying Precambrian metamorphic rocks near Rapid City, South Dakota

At the type locality in the Black Hills of South Dakota and in many other areas, the Deadwood Formation rests unconformably on Precambrian metamorphic rocks that were exposed to a long period of erosion prior to the deposition of the formation. In western Montana, western Saskatchewan and Alberta it overlies the Middle Cambrian rocks of the Earlie Formation or the Pika Formation.

In the Williston Basin it is overlain by the Winnipeg Formation in the center and by the Red River Formation near the margins. In the central and southern Black Hills it is overlain by the Mississippian Englewood Formation. In Alberta and Saskatchewan it is overlain by the Devonian Elk Point Group.

== Lithology ==
In the type area, the Deadwood Formation consists of a basal conglomerate and buff sandstones, overlain a sequence of by grey-green shales, carbonate rocks, and glauconitic quartzose sandstones. Skolithos borings are present in some units. The Deadwood conglomerates contained significant quantities of gold in the Black Hills.

In Saskatchewan the Deadwood consists of fine to very coarse, commonly glauconitic, micaceous, feldspathic, slightly argillaceous and calcareous quartzose sandstones, with minor shales and conglomerates. Conglomerates are common near the base of the formation. They typically consist of Precambrian rock fragments set in finer-grained sediments, and are normally poorly sorted and unstratified.

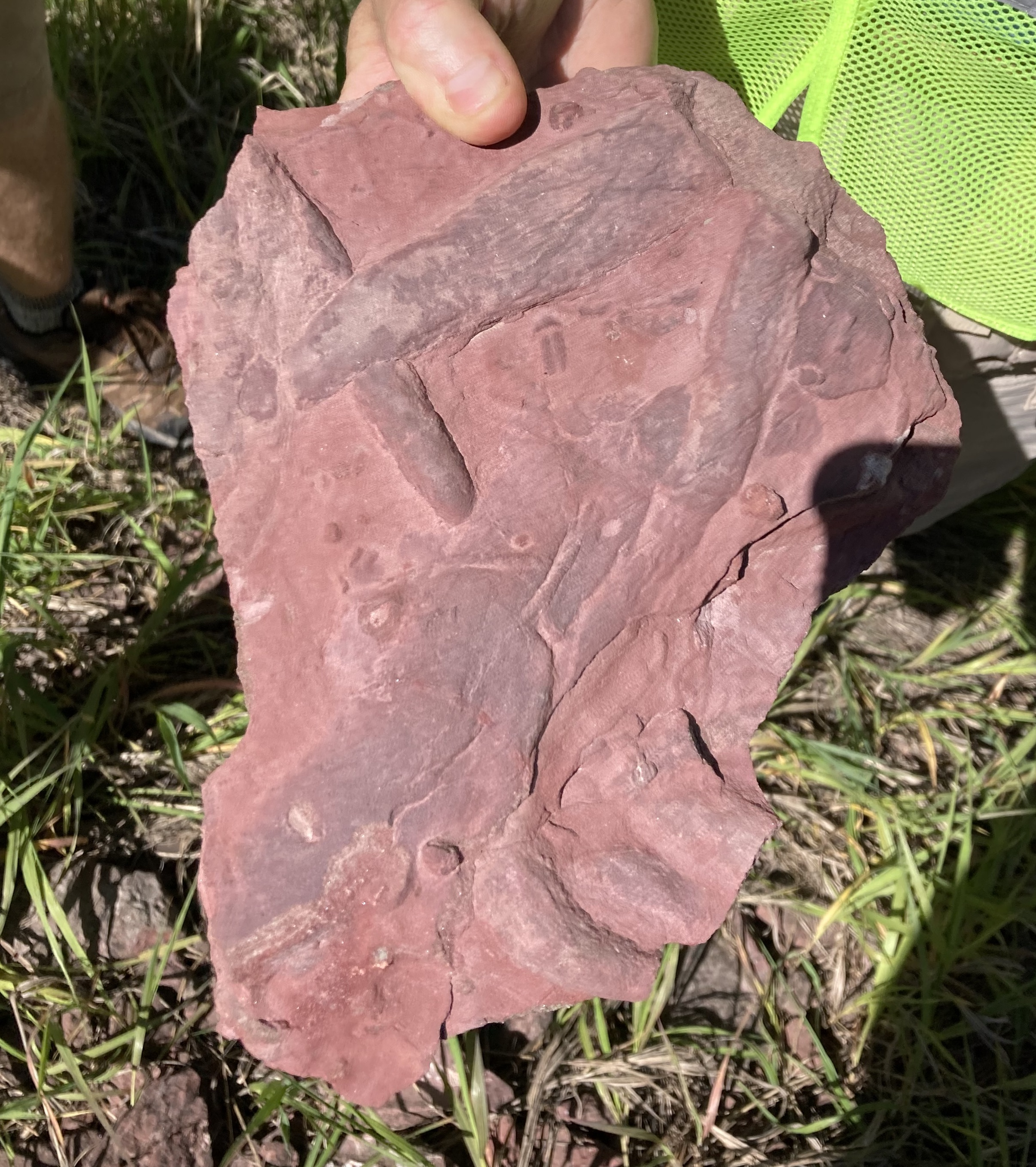
A slab of the pinkish-red Cambrian Deadwood Sandstone float shows clear evidence of bioturbation and worm burrows. Exposed from an outcrop off SD 44, west of Rapid City.

== Environment of deposition ==
In most areas the sediments of the Deadwood Formation were deposited in near shore, shallow water environments as an ancient sea advanced across the exposed and weathered landscape of Precambrian rocks. Most of the conglomerates appear to be matrix-supported debris flow deposits.

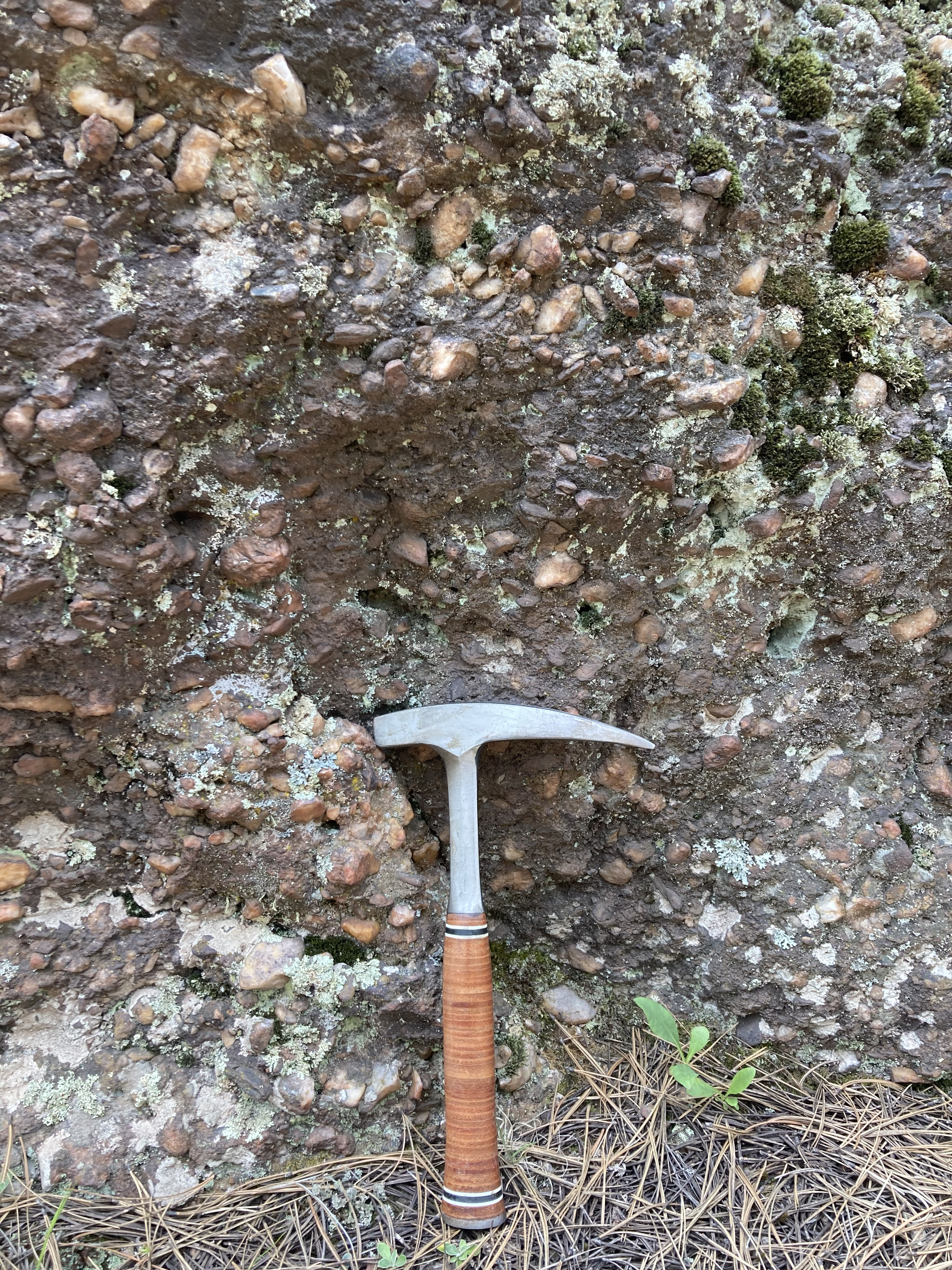
A typical exposure of the basal conglomerate in the Deadwood Formation, near Nemo, SD. Note the lack of sorting and stratification in the clasts, as well as their mainly quartzic provenance. Rock hammer for scale.

== Thickness and distribution ==
The Deadwood Formation is present beneath large areas of the northern plains, and its thickness can vary over short distances due largely to the substantial topographic relief on the eroded Precambrian surface. It reaches thicknesses of up to about 270 metres (890 ft) in the northern Black Hills. It thins to zero eastward and is absent in northeastern North Dakota and most of eastern Saskatchewan. It is present in the extreme southwestern corner of Manitoba where it may reach thicknesses of 30 metres (100 ft). It thickens westward throughout Saskatchewan and Montana to the Saskatchewan-Alberta border, where it exceeds 300 metres (980 ft). From there it thins towards the mountain front to the west. In the north the formation extends almost to 55°N latitude.

== See also ==
- List of fossiliferous stratigraphic units in North Dakota
- Paleontology in North Dakota
- Black Hills Gold Rush
