= Cathedral Formation =

Geologic formation in Canada

- Stratigraphic range: Middle Cambrian; ~509–500 Ma
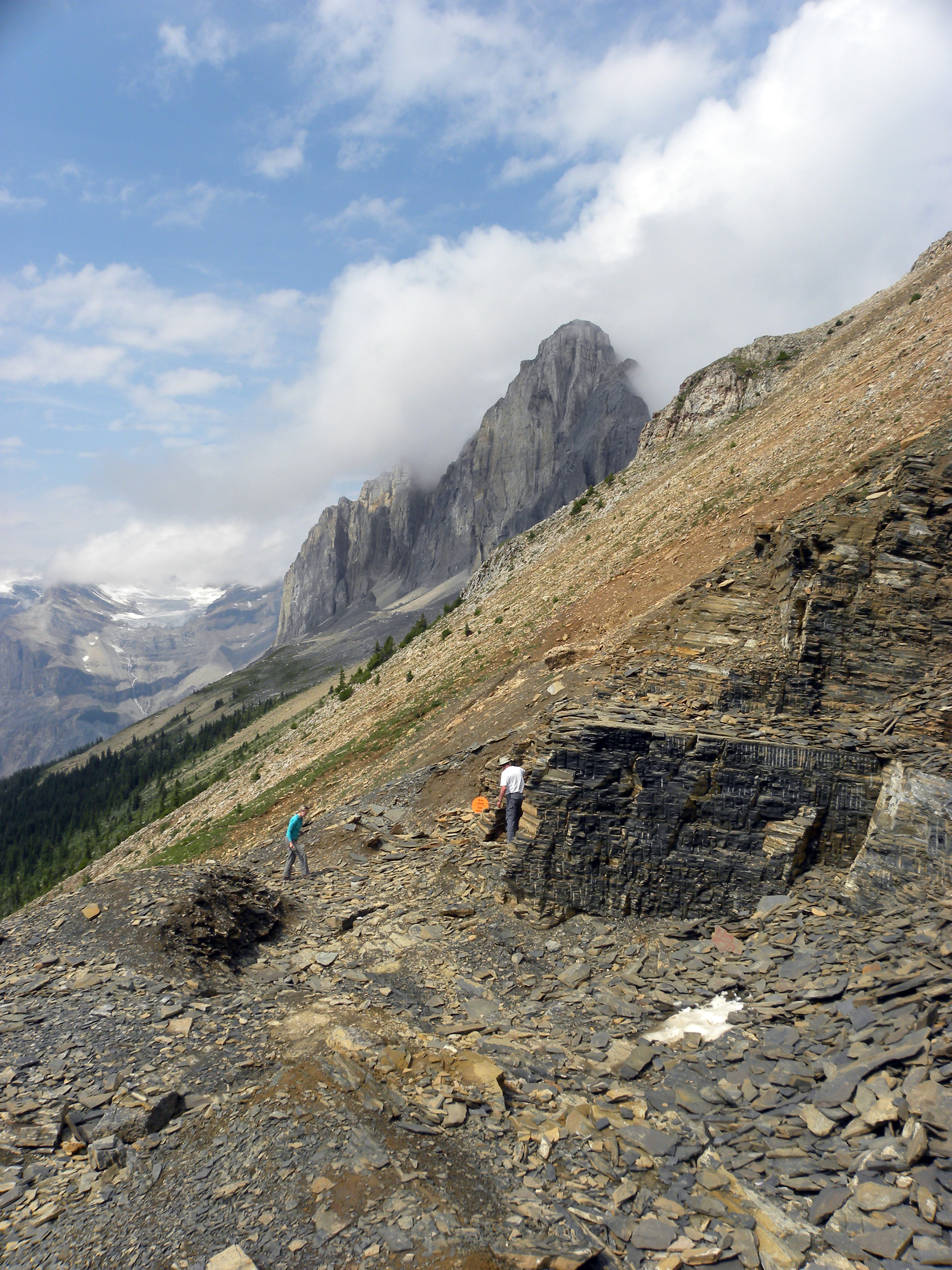
- The Cathedral Formation and Cathedral Escarpment form the grey mountain in the distance, with the Burgess Shale and Walcott Quarry in the foreground.
- Type: Formation
- Underlies: Stephen Formation
- Overlies: Mount Whyte Formation, Naiset Formation
- Thickness: Up to 610 metres (2000 ft)

Lithology
- Primary: Limestone, Dolomite
- Other: Calcareous mudstone

Location
- Coordinates: 51°23′47″N 116°23′25″W
- Region: Canadian Rockies
- Country: Canada

Type section
- Named for: Cathedral Mountain
- Named by: Charles Doolittle Walcott, 1908

The Cathedral Formation is a stratigraphic unit in the southern Canadian Rockies of Alberta and British Columbia, on the western edge of the Western Canada Sedimentary Basin. It is a thick sequence of carbonate rocks of Middle Cambrian age. It was named for Cathedral Mountain in Yoho National Park by Charles Doolittle Walcott, the discoverer of the Burgess Shale fossils.

The Cathedral Formation includes fossil stromatolites, oncolites, and other algal remains, as well as a few shale beds with trilobites. The Cathedral escarpment on its westernmost edge is thought to have played a major role in the deposition and preservation of the Burgess shale fossils.

== Lithology and deposition ==
The Cathedral Formation consists primarily of massive, cliff-forming carbonate rocks. It was originally deposited as limestone, much of which may have been secreted by marine algae. Deposition took place in shallow water on an extensive algal reef or carbonate platform that had developed along the western margin of the North American Craton. The limestone was subsequently altered to dolomite in many areas. The formation also includes several beds of shale with fossil trilobites that establish its age and stratigraphic relationships by biostratigraphy.

== Cathedral escarpment ==
The Cathedral escarpment is an abrupt cliff on the westernmost edge of the Cathedral Formation. It was probably a submarine cliff that marked the edge of the original carbonate platform. It is approximately 100 to 300 metres (330 to 1000 feet) high and extends for about 100 kilometres (62 miles) running through and around Yoho National Park, although only small portions of it are exposed. During the deposition of the Stephen Formation, mudflows ran down and along the escarpment, trapping the Burgess shale organisms and burying them quickly at the base of the cliff. This prevented their decay, preserving their soft tissues as well as their hard parts in the Stephen Formation shales.

== Distribution and stratigraphic relationships ==
The Cathedral Formation is present in the southern Canadian Rockies of southwestern Alberta and southeastern British Columbia. It reaches a maximum thickness of about 610 metres (2000 feet) at Mount Stephen. It is in gradational contact with the underlying Mount Whyte and Naiset Formations, and with the overlying Stephen Formation.

To the west, the Cathedral Formation terminates abruptly against the shales of the Stephen Formation at the Cathedral escarpment. The formation thins eastward, grading into the Earlie Formation beneath the Alberta plains. To the north it grades into the Snake Indian Formation. It is equivalent to the thinner Elko Formation to the south.

== Economic resources ==
The Cathedral Formation hosts deposits of magnesite (MgCO_{3}) at Mt. Brussilof, about 35 km (22 miles) northwest of Radium Hot Springs in British Columbia. The ore consists of magnesite-rich sparry carbonate masses that have been mined by open-pit methods since 1982. The ore is processed to produce magnesium oxide (MgO) at Exshaw, Alberta.

The formation also hosts deposits of lead, zinc, and silver in the Kicking Horse Pass east of Field, British Columbia. They were discovered in 1884 during the construction of the Canadian Pacific Railway, and are Mississippi Valley-Type (MVT) deposits. They were mined intermittently for more than 60 years. The primary ore minerals are pyrite, sphalerite, and galena, which are associated with dolomite, minor quartz, and calcite. The abandoned mine portals and adits can still be seen along the cliffs that flank the Transcanada Highway.
