= Lynx Group =

Stratigraphic unit in Canada

- Stratigraphic range: Dresbachian
- Type: Formation or Group
- Sub-units: Mistaya Formation; Bison Creek Formation; Lyell Formation; Sullivan Formation; Waterfowl Formation
- Underlies: Survey Peak Formation
- Overlies: Arctomys Formation
- Thickness: up to 1,220 metres (4,000 ft)

Lithology
- Primary: Carbonate rocks
- Other: Shale

Location
- Coordinates: 53.1407°N 119.0492°W
- Region: Canadian Rockies
- Country: Canada

Type section
- Named for: Lynx Mountain
- Named by: C.D. Walcott, 1913

The Lynx Group is a stratigraphic unit of Late Cambrian (Dresbachian) age in the Western Canada Sedimentary Basin. It is present in the Canadian Rockies of Alberta and British Columbia. It was originally described as the Lynx Formation by Charles Doolittle Walcott in 1913, based on and named for outcrops on the slopes of Lynx Mountain on the continental divide east of Mount Robson. It was subdivided into five formations and elevated to group status by J.D. Aitken and R.G. Greggs in 1967. The name Lynx Formation continues to be used in areas where some or all of the subdivisions cannot be distinguished. All of the formations in the Lynx Group include fossil trilobites, and some contain the stromatolite Collenia.

== Lithology and deposition ==
The Lynx Group is composed alternating zones of carbonate rocks, most of which are dolomitic, and shales. It was deposited in shallow marine environments along the western margin of the North American Craton during Late Cambrian time. In many areas it is subdivided into the five formations listed below.

== Subdivisions ==
Upper Lynx Group

Formation	Lithology	Max. thickness	Reference
Mistaya Formation	carbonate rocks, minor cherty layers	158 m (520 ft)	
Bison Creek Formation	green and grey shales, argillaceous limestone	203 m (670 ft)	
Lyell Formation	massive cliff-forming carbonate rocks	519 m (1,700 ft)	

Lower Lynx Group

Formation	Lithology	Max. thickness	Reference
Sullivan Formation	grey, green, and brown shales, argillaceous limestone	424 m (1,390 ft)	
Waterfowl Formation	cliff-forming carbonate rocks, minor siltstone and sandstone	183 m (600 ft)	

== Distribution ==
The Lynx Group is present in the Canadian Rockies of Alberta and British Columbia. It is typically between 1068-1220 metres (3500-400 feet) thick in the front and main ranges. It extends as far north as the Monkman Pass area of British Columbia.

== Relationship to other units ==
The Lynx Group overlies the Arctomys Formation and the contact is gradational. It is overlain by the Survey Peak Formation and the contact is concordant but abrupt.
