= Titkana Formation =

Geologic formation in Canada

- Stratigraphic range: Middle Cambrian; ~509–500 Ma
- Type: Formation
- Underlies: Pika Formation
- Overlies: Tatei Formation
- Thickness: Up to 520 metres (1700 ft)

Lithology
- Primary: Limestone, dolomitic limestone

Location
- Coordinates: 59°19′20″N 119°03′59″W
- Region: Canadian Rockies
- Country: Canada

Type section
- Named for: Titkana Peak
- Named by: Charles Doolittle Walcott

The Titkana Formation is a stratigraphic unit of Middle Cambrian age that is present on the western edge of the Western Canada Sedimentary Basin in the northern Canadian Rockies of Alberta and British Columbia. It was named for Titkana Peak near Mount Robson by Charles Doolittle Walcott in 1913. The Titkana Formation is generally unfossiliferous.

== Lithology and deposition ==
The Titkana Formation formed as a shallow marine shelf along the western shoreline of the North American Craton during Middle Cambrian time. Some of the original limestone was subsequently altered to dolomite.

== Distribution and stratigraphic relationships ==
The Titkana is present in the northern Canadian Rockies of Alberta and British Columbia where it reaches thicknesses of up to about 520 metres (1700 ft). It conformably overlies the Pika Formation and is unconformably overlain by the Tatei Formation. It is equivalent to the Eldon Formation in the southern Canadian Rockies.
