= Mount Whyte Formation =

Geologic formation in Canada

- Stratigraphic range: Middle Cambrian; ~509–500 Ma
- Type: Formation
- Underlies: Cathedral Formation
- Overlies: Gog Group
- Thickness: Up to 176 metres (578 ft)

Lithology
- Primary: Shale, limestone
- Other: Sandstone, conglomerate

Location
- Coordinates: 51°24′32″N 116°16′16″W
- Region: Canadian Rockies
- Country: Canada

Type section
- Named for: Mount Whyte
- Named by: Charles Doolittle Walcott

The Mount Whyte Formation is a stratigraphic unit that is present on the western edge of the Western Canada Sedimentary Basin in the southern Canadian Rockies and the adjacent southwestern Alberta plains. It was deposited during Middle Cambrian time and consists of shale interbedded with other siliciclastic rock types and limestones. It was named for Mount Whyte in Banff National Park by Charles Doolittle Walcott, the discoverer of the Burgess Shale fossils, and it includes several genera of fossil trilobites.

== Lithology and deposition ==
The Mount Whyte Formation was deposited during Middle Cambrian time in shallow water at the western margin of the North American Craton. It consists mainly of shale interbedded with other siliciclastic rock types and limestone. In the Mount Whyte area it can be subdivided into three units:

- Upper member: Shale interbedded with oolitic limestone.
- Middle member: Shale with thin beds of sandstones and conglomerates, grading into impure limestones at the top.
- Basal member: Thin-bedded limestones and sandy limestones with lenticular beds of pebbly sandstone and shale partings.

== Distribution and stratigraphic relationships ==
The Mount Whyte Formation outcrops in the southern Rocky Mountains of southwestern Alberta and southeastern British Columbia, and is present in the subsurface beneath the southwestern Alberta plains where it grades onto the Earlie Formation. It grades into the Snake Indian Formation to the north and Naiset Formation to the west. It disconformably overlies the Lower Cambrian Gog Group and is conformably overlain by the Cathedral Formation.

== Paleontology ==
The Mount Whyte Formation includes Olenellus and other fossil trilobites that establish its Middle Cambrian age by biostratigraphy.

== See also ==
- List of fossiliferous stratigraphic units in British Columbia
