= Cliff Mountain (Alberta) =

Mountain in Alberta, Canada

- Location within Alberta Location within Canada

Highest point
- Elevation: 2,763 m (9,065 ft)
- Prominence: 614 m (2,014 ft)
- Parent peak: Whitecap Mountain (2864 m)
- Listing: Mountains of Alberta
- Coordinates: 53°04′39″N 118°13′46″W

Geography
- Country: Canada
- Province: Alberta
- Protected area: Jasper National Park
- Parent range: Front Ranges
- Topo map: NTS 83E1 Snaring River

Cliff Mountain is a 2,763-metre (9,065-foot) mountain summit located in Jasper National Park, in the Canadian Rockies of Alberta, Canada.

The mountain was named in 1916 by Morrison P. Bridgland because of its steep faces on all sides. Bridgland (1878–1948) was a Dominion Land Surveyor who named many peaks in Jasper Park and the Canadian Rockies. The mountain's name was officially adopted in 1956 by the Geographical Names Board of Canada.

== See also ==
- Geography of Alberta
