= Stephen Formation =

Geologic formation in Canada

- Stratigraphic range: Middle Cambrian
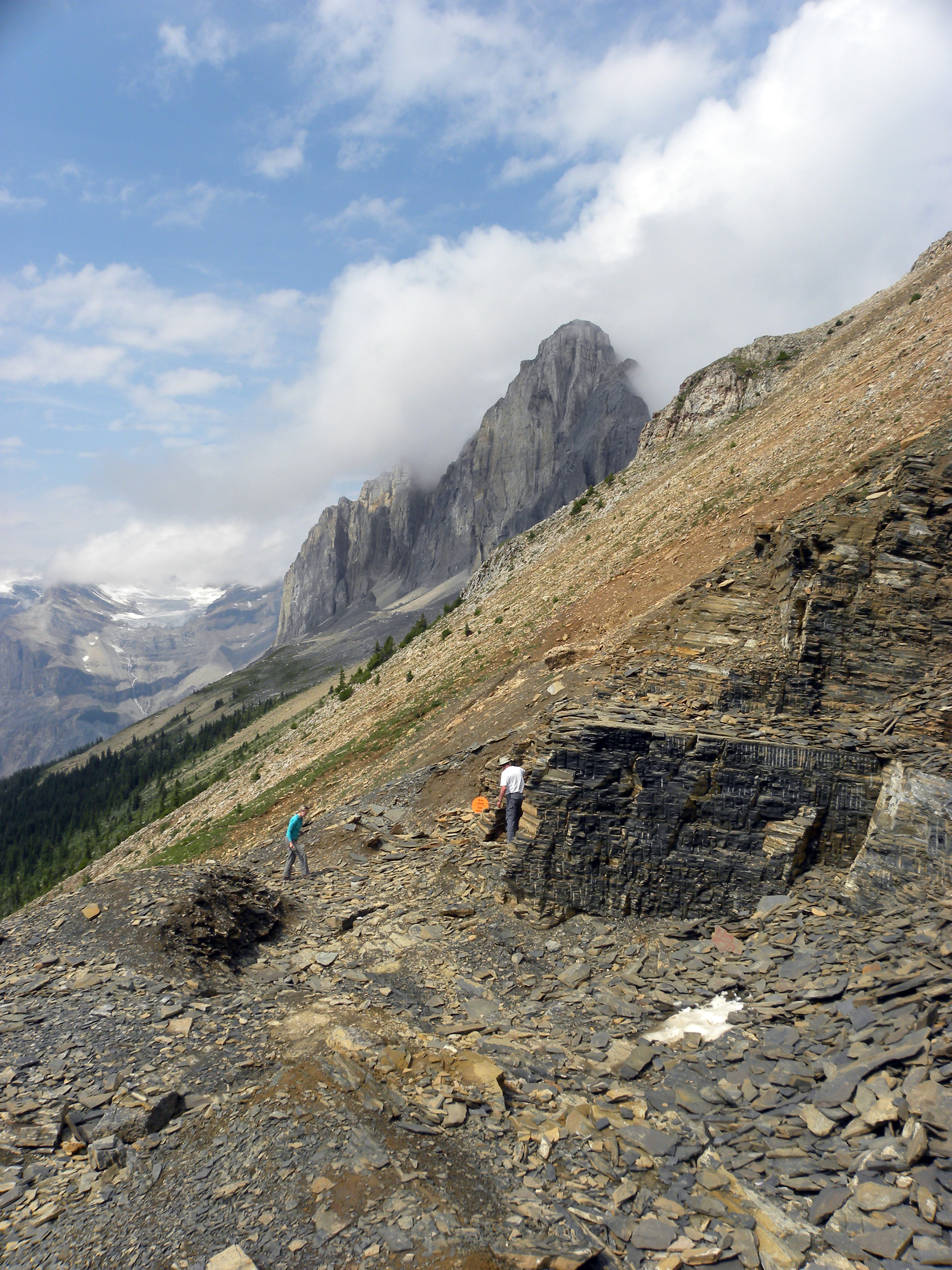
- The Walcott Quarry in the Stephen Formation shales
- Type: Geological formation
- Underlies: Eldon Formation
- Overlies: Cathedral Formation
- Thickness: "Thin" Stephen: < 60 metres (200 ft) "Thick" Stephen: up to 335 metres (1,100 ft)

Lithology
- Primary: Shale, limestone
- Other: Siltstone

Location
- Coordinates: 51.46425°N 116.32443°W
- Region: Canadian Rockies
- Country: Canada

Type section
- Named for: Mount Stephen (from George Stephen)
- Named by: Charles Doolittle Walcott, 1908

The Stephen Formation is a geologic formation exposed in the Canadian Rockies of British Columbia and Alberta, on the western edge of the Western Canada Sedimentary Basin. It consists of shale, thin-bedded limestone, and siltstone that was deposited during Middle Cambrian time (513 to 497 million years ago). It is famous for the exceptional preservation of soft-bodied fossils: the Burgess Shale biota. The formation overlies the Cathedral escarpment, a submarine cliff; consequently it is divided into two quite separate parts, the 'thin' sequence deposited in the shallower waters atop the escarpment, and the 'thick' sequence deposited in the deeper waters beyond the cliff. Because the 'thick' Stephen Formation represents a distinct lithofacies, some authors suggest it warrants its own name, and dub it the Burgess Shale Formation. The stratigraphy of the Thin Stephen Formation has not been subject to extensive study, so except where explicitly mentioned this article applies mainly to the Thick Stephen Formation.

== Sedimentary setting ==
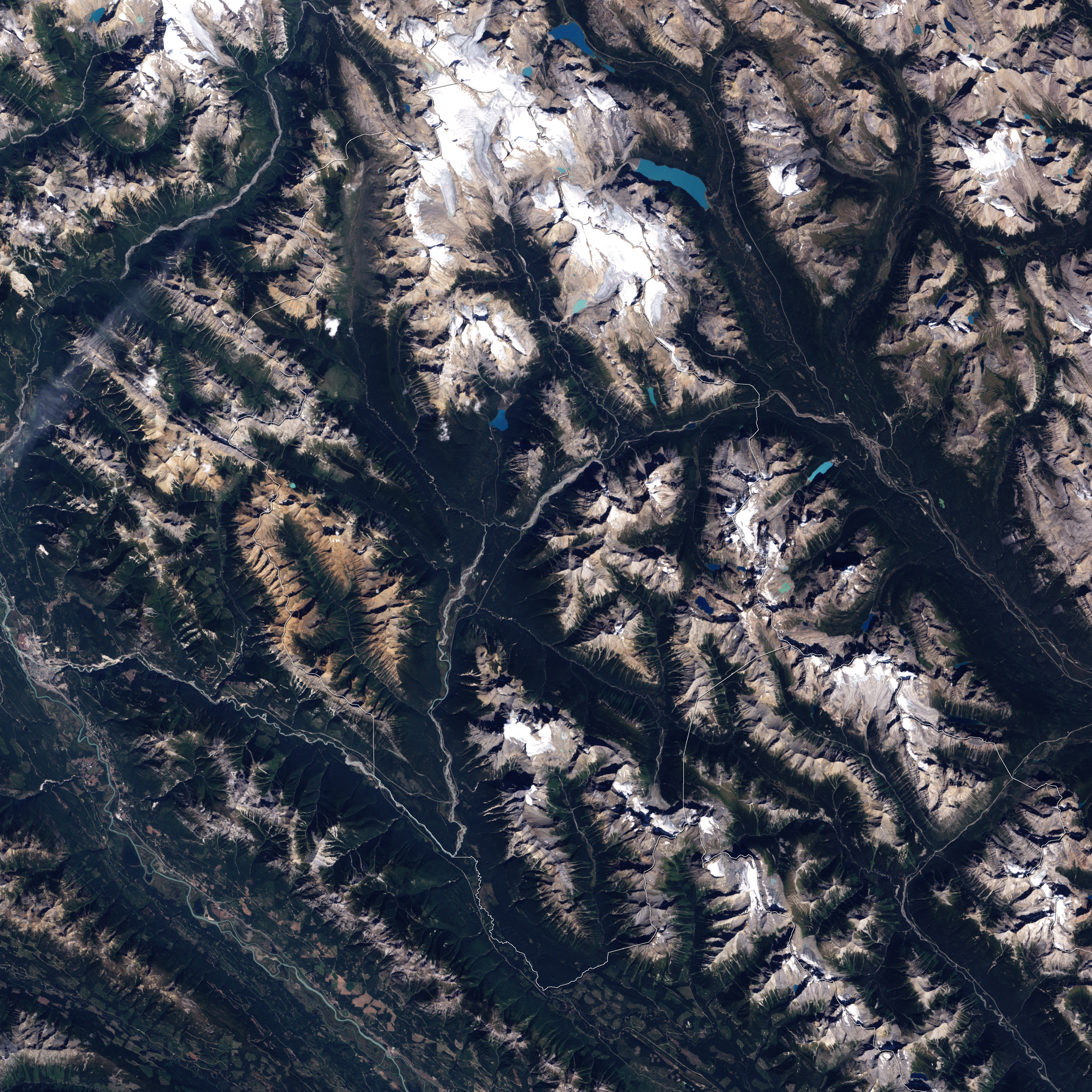
Satellite image of the area.

The Stephen Formation formed at a low-latitude miogeoclinic continental margin, at the western limit of a continental craton. Detrital sediments were washed in by rivers from the continent, over the limestone reefs which formed the shallow sea floor. At the top of sequence-stratigraphic cycles, oncoids were sometimes washed in to the Thin Stephen formation from the shallower waters closer to the shore.

The fossiliferous deposits of the Stephen Formation are a sequence of slightly calcareous dark mudstones, about 508 million years old. The beds were deposited on top of and at the base of a cliff about 160 meters (520 ft) tall, below the depth agitated by waves during storms, and thus at a water depth of around 200 m. This vertical cliff was composed of the calcareous reefs of the Cathedral Formation, which probably formed shortly before the deposition of the Burgess shale. The precise formation mechanism is not known for certain, but the most widely accepted hypothesis suggests that the edge of the Cathedral formation reef became detached from the rest of the reef, slumping and being transported some distance — perhaps kilometres — away from the reef edge. Later reactivation of faults at the base of the formation led to its disintegration from about 509 million years ago. This would have left a steep cliff, the bottom of which would be protected, because the limestone of the Cathedral formation is difficult to compress, from tectonic decompression. This protection explains why fossils preserved further from the Cathedral formation are impossible to work with — tectonic squeezing of the beds produced a vertical cleavage that fractures the rocks, so they split perpendicular to the fossils. The Walcott quarry produced such spectacular fossils because it was so close the Stephen formation — indeed the quarry has now been excavated to the very edge of the Cambrian cliff. Both the thick and thin Stephen formation were deposited below wave base.

It was originally thought that the Burgess Shale was deposited in anoxic conditions, but mounting research shows that oxygen was continually present in the sediment. The anoxic setting had been thought to not only protect the newly dead organisms from decay, but it also created chemical conditions allowing the preservation of the soft parts of the organisms. Further, it reduced the abundance of burrowing organisms — burrows and trackways are found in beds containing soft-bodied organisms, but they are rare and generally of limited vertical extent.

== Subdivisions ==
The formation is made up of the Kicking Horse member, which includes the Alalcomenaeus–Sanctacaris beds; this underlies and interdigitates with the unfossiliferous Yoho River member. These two are truncated by an unconformity and covered by the Campsite Cliff member, which contains the Ogygopsis beds. The Wash member, which contains many shelly but no soft-bodied fossils, interrupts this sequence in places, and directly underlies the Phyllopod beds, which mark the base of the Walcott Quarry member. This underlies the Wapta member, which is unconformably overlain by 'Tokumm'.

The Wapta member has been redefined into the Raymond Quarry member, Emerald Lake member, Odaray member, Paradox member and Marpole member. The thin Stephen grades conformably into the overlying Eldon formation.

== Fossiliferous collection sites ==
Of the dozen-plus fossiliferous sites in the Stephen formation, the Walcott Quarry is the most famous, bearing the Phyllopod beds. This lies at the base of the Walcott Quarry member, and three other quarries – the Raymond, UE and EZ – lie above it. The UE and EZ quarries herald from the Upper Ehmaniella Zone and Ehmaniella Zone, respectively, and belong to the Emerald Lake member. The Campsite Cliff member contains the Ogygopsis-bearing Mount Stephen trilobite beds (both on Mount Stephen), while the Collins Quarry (containing the Sanctacaris beds) is situated in the Kicking Horse member. The S7 locality on Mount Stephen has been attributed both to the Campsite Cliff member and the Kicking Horse member. The Trilobite Beds, the first Burgess Shale locality to be discovered, mark the southerly extent of fossiliferous exposure on Mount Stephen, although many more sites exist on the inaccessible northeasterly flank of the mountain. The Lower Trilobite Beds, although lower on the mountainside, are in fact stratigraphically higher than the Upper Trilobite Beds.

Fossils have also been collected from the 'thin' Stephen Formation, in the vicinity of the Stanley Glacier, some 40 km from the main collecting sites on Fossil Ridge and Mount Stephen. They have been recorded around Odaray Mountain, Park Mountain, Curtis Peak, Natalko Lake and Monarch Cirque, although no major collection at these localities has yet been performed.
