= Golden Tap Awards =

Annual beer awards event in Toronto, Ontario, Canada

The Golden Tap Awards (GTAs) is an annual beer awards event held in Toronto, Ontario, Canada. The awards are sponsored and presented by The Bar Towel, a website and forum dedicated to the discussion and promotion of Toronto's craft and microbrew beer scene.

The GTAs were launched in 2003 as a way to recognise the achievements of craft brewers and bar owners in the Greater Toronto Area, hence the "GTA" acronym. In 2006, the scope of the awards was expanded to include brewers and bars throughout the province of Ontario. Winners of the awards are selected via online voting. In 2003 and 2004, the event took place at The Academy of Spherical Arts. In 2005, the event was moved to beerbistro where each event has featured an all-Ontario craft beer festival to coincide with the awards.

In 2009 the Golden Tap Awards consolidated all awards to recognize winners from across the province, instead of segmenting as GTA and outside of the GTA. The Golden Tap Awards will also recognize brewers who produce cask-conditioned beers for the first time.

The 2010 Golden Tap Awards were announced on August 21, 2010 at beerbistro, with a special Ontario Craft Brewers dinner taking place on Friday, August 20 as a part of the celebrations.

The last time the awards were held was in 2018. While they indicated that the awards may return in 2022, their website as of December 2025 lists the 2018 awards as the most recent ones.

== Past winners ==
2009

- Best micro or craft brewery in Ontario: Beau's All Natural Brewing Company, Vankleek Hill
- Best brewery for cask-conditioned ale in Ontario: Granite Brewery
- Best bar for draught beer selection in Ontario: C'est What
- Best bar for bottled beer selection in Ontario: Bar Volo
- Best bar for cask-conditioned ale in Ontario: Bar Volo
- Best brewpub or tied house in Ontario: Mill Street Brewpub
- Best regularly produced craft beer in Ontario: Beau's All Natural Brewing Company Lug-Tread Lagered Ale
- Best seasonal or specialty craft beer in Ontario: Black Oak Summer Saison
- Best cask-conditioned ale in Ontario: County Durham Hop Head
- Best of the festival: Beau's All Natural Brewing Company Lug-Tread Lagered Ale, Vankleek Hill
- Editor's Circle: Cask Ale Crawl
- Editor's Circle: Rob Creighton & Grand River Brewing
- Editor's Circle: Derek Hyde & Amsterdam Brewing
- Editor's Circle: Jim Brickman

2008

- Best Microbrewery in the GTA: Mill Street Brewery
- Best Microbrewery in Ontario (non-GTA): Beau's All Natural Brewing Company, Vankleek Hill
- Best Beer Brewed in the GTA: Steam Whistle
- Best Beer Brewed in Ontario (non-GTA): Beau's All Natural Brewing Company Lug-Tread Lagered Ale, Vankleek Hill
- Best GTA Beer Bar (Draught Selection): C'est What
- Best GTA Beer Bar (Bottled Selection): beerbistro
- Best Ontario (non-GTA) Beer Bar: The Manx, Ottawa
- Best Ontario (including GTA) Brewpub or Tied House: Mill Street Brewpub, Toronto
- Best Beer of the Fest: Grand River Bumbleberry Wheat, Cambridge

Plus four Editor's Choice Awards, as determined by a panel of Bar Towel members and associates:

- St Veronus, Belgian bistro in Peterborough
- Cameron's Cask Nights, a cask tasting event series
- Dogfish Head Beer Dinner hosted by beerbistro
- Steve Peters, speaker of the Legislative Assembly of Ontario

2007

- Best Microbrewery in the GTA: Mill Street Brewery
- Best Microbrewery in Ontario (non-GTA): Church-Key Brewing Company, Campbellford
- Best Beer Brewed in the GTA: Mill Street Tankhouse Ale
- Best Beer Brewed in Ontario (non-GTA): Beau's All Natural Brewing Company Lug-Tread Lagered Ale, Vankleek Hill
- Best GTA Beer Bar (Draught Selection): C'est What
- Best GTA Beer Bar (Bottled Selection): beerbistro
- Best Ontario (non-GTA) Beer Bar: Augusta's Winking Judge, Hamilton
- Best Ontario (including GTA) Brewpub or Tied House: Mill Street Brewpub, Toronto
- Best Beer of the Fest: Black Oak Transvestite's Tipple, Oakville

Plus four Editor's Choice Awards, as determined by a panel of Bar Towel members and associates:

- Great Lakes Brewery, brewers of Devil's Pale Ale, Orange Peel Ale and others
- Michael Hancock, brewer of Denison's Weissbier and Dunkel
- Roland + Russel, beer importers
- Volo Cask Days, an event organized by Bar Volo in Toronto

2006

- Best Ontario (non-GTA) Beer Bar: Augusta's Winking Judge, Hamilton
- Best GTA Beer Bar (Bottled Selection): Volo
- Best GTA Beer Bar (Draught Selection): C'est What
- Best Ontario (including GTA) Brewpub or Tied House: Granite Brewery, Toronto
- Best Ontario (non-GTA) Microbrewery: Wellington Brewery, Guelph
- Best GTA Microbrewery: Mill Street Brewery
- Best Ontario (non-GTA) Beer: Scotch-Irish Sgt. Major's IPA, Ottawa
- Best GTA Beer: Mill Street Tankhouse Ale
- Best Beer of the Fest: Beau's All Natural Brewing Company Lug Tread Lagered Ale "Kolsch-Bock"

2005

- Best Beer Bar (Bottled Selection): Smokeless Joe
- Best Beer Bar (Draught Selection): C'est What
- Best New Beer Bar: beerbistro
- Best Microbrewery: Mill Street Brewery
- Best Beer: Mill Street Tankhouse Pale Ale
- Best New Beer: Cameron's Dark 266
- Best Beer of the Fest: Black Oak Hop Bomb

2004

- Best Beer Bar (Bottled Selection): Smokeless Joe
- Best Beer Bar (Draught Selection): C'est What
- Best Microbrewery: Mill Street Brewery
- Best Beer: (tie) Mill Street Tankhouse Pale Ale and Steam Whistle Pilsner

2003

- Best Beer Bar (Bottled Selection): Smokeless Joe
- Best Beer Bar (Draught Selection): C'est What
- Best Microbrewery: Black Oak Brewing
- Best Brewpub: Granite Brewery
- Best Beer: Granite Best Bitter Special

== See also ==
- Beer in Canada
