= Upper Canada Brewing Company =

Brewery in Guelph, Ontario, Canada

- Industry: Alcoholic drink
- Founded: 1985
- Headquarters: Guelph, Ontario, Canada
- Products: Beer
- Owner: Sleeman Breweries Ltd.

Upper Canada Brewing Company is a division of Sleeman Breweries in Guelph, Ontario, Canada. Founded by Frank Heaps and Larry Sherwood (of Granville Island Brewery) in Toronto, it started brewing beer in 1985 and grew to become one of the largest independent breweries in Canada.

While an independent, the brewery's location was at 2 Atlantic Ave. in Toronto and included a "gift shop" that allowed the independent brewer to sell alcohol on Sunday, something that Ontario's licensed outlet Beer Store chain, which had a virtual monopoly on beer sales, was not permitted to do at the time. Upper Canada also provided private label brewing services for third party companies. Beaver Valley Amber Ale was brewed in conjunction with Thornbury Castle Brewing Inc. in Thornbury Ontario.

The company was sold to private investors in 1995, went public in 1996, and was finally acquired by Sleeman Breweries in 1998.

Sleeman purchased the company for $28 million and reduced the number of Upper Canada products since they were competing with the Sleeman line. The new owners also closed the Toronto brewery and moved the operations to its Guelph, Ontario facility. Two brands are manufactured: Upper Canada Lager, a German-style lager and Upper Canada Dark Ale, "with a robust malty character and a rich chestnut colour".

After the sale to Sleeman, Heaps provided some funding to his son Cameron and his partners Greg Taylor and Greg Cromwell, all formerly employees of Upper Canada, who opened another Toronto-based brewery in 2000, Steam Whistle Brewing.
