= Cameron's Brewing Company =

Brewery in Oakville, Ontario, Canada

- Industry: Alcoholic beverage
- Founded: 1997
- Headquarters: 1165 Invicta Dr. Oakville, Ontario
- Products: Beer

Cameron's Brewing Company is a brewery in Oakville, Ontario, Canada. Founded in 1997, it produces four varieties of beer: Cameron's Cream Ale, Cameron's Auburn Ale, Cameron's Lager, and Cameron's RPA (Rye Pale Ale).

== Awards ==
Awards
Year	Canadian Brewing Awards	U.S. Open Beer Championship
2007	two medals	
2008	two medals	
2009	three medals	
2010	gold for Dark 266; bronze for Cream Ale	gold for lager in American lager category

== Management ==
In 2020 Jason Britton and Clint Israel oversaw renovations to the company's management and facilities.
