= Maudite =

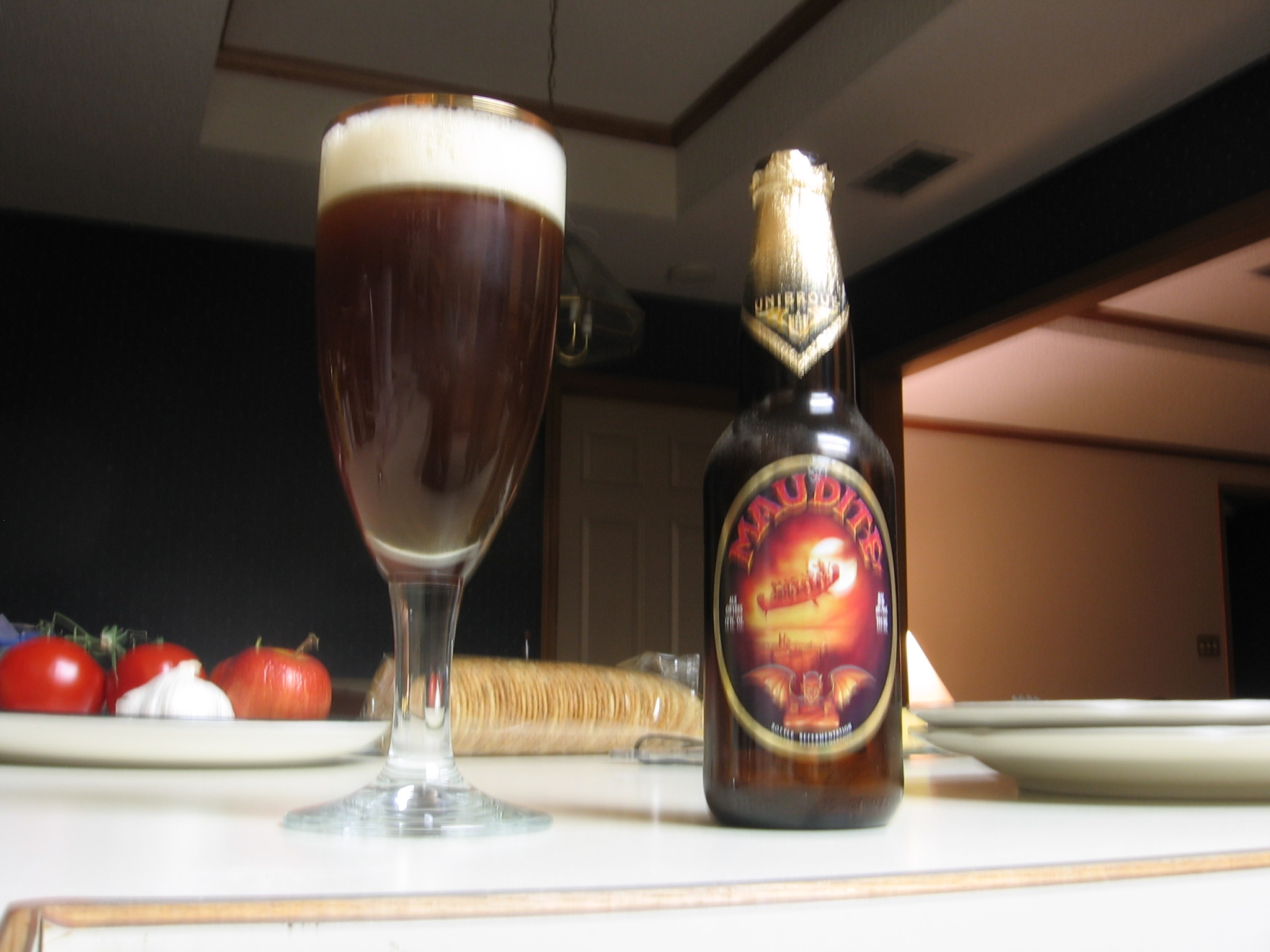
Maudite

Maudite is a Belgian-style strong dark ale that has been brewed by Unibroue since 1992. It is an ale that is conditioned in the bottle. Maudite or maudit used to be a strong expletive (meaning "damned"), a binding oath, among French-speaking Quebecers, while the younger generation's view of the word is derisive.

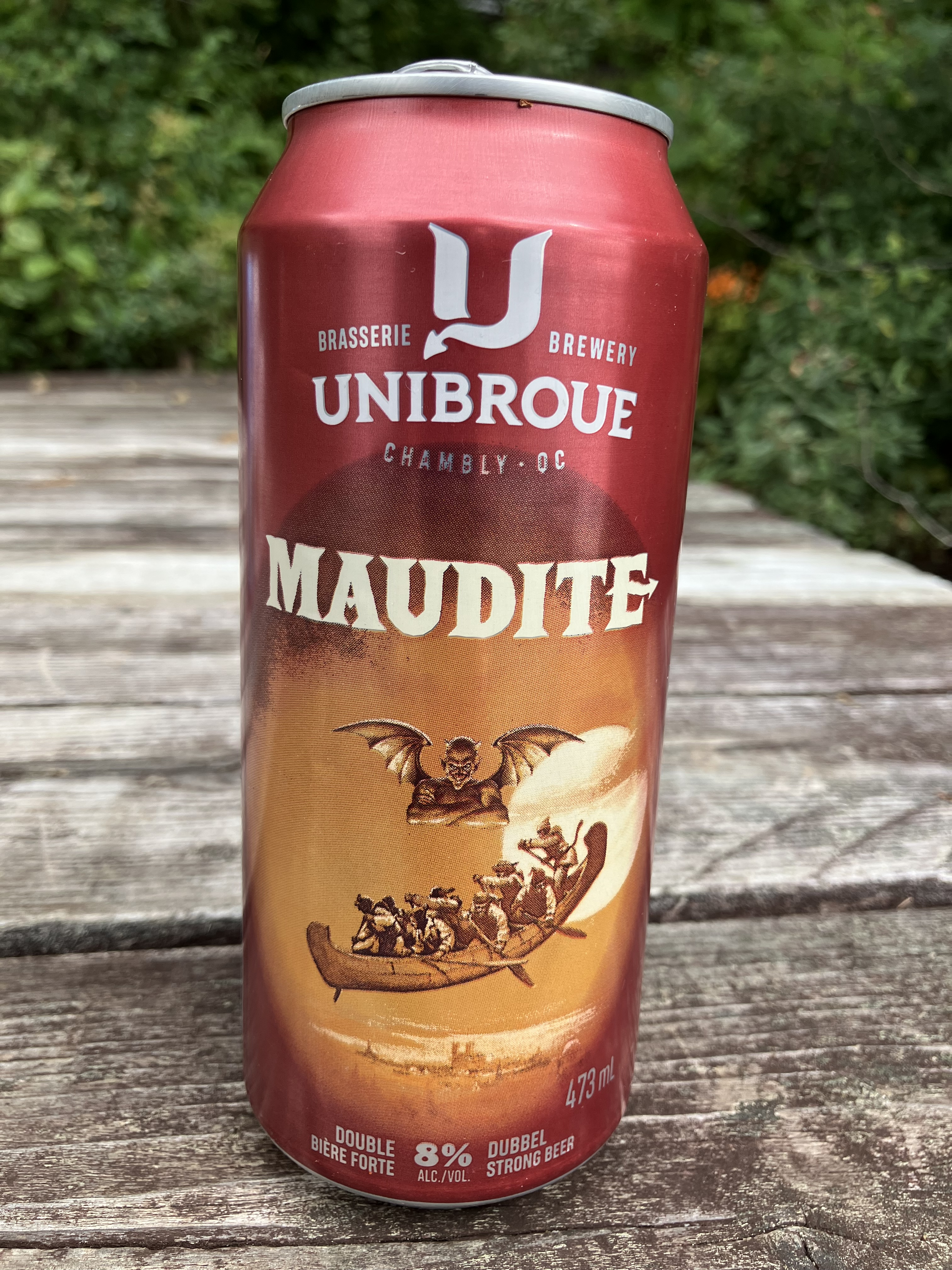
A can of Maudite

The beer's style is a strong red-ale, with an ABV of 8%. The taste is said to be one of wheat, citrus and spice. Maudite's name is reminiscent of the legend of the Chasse-galerie (the legend of the Flying Canoe). Legend has it that a group of Voyageurs (fur traders) who were stuck by frozen rivers in the northern woods, made a deal with the devil to fly the traders to Montreal in their canoes in time for the Christmas holidays. Satan made it clear that no man could utter the name of God during the flight, but one man could not hold his tongue and yelled "oh my God," at which point the canoe plummeted to the ground and they were never heard from again.

== Sources ==
- LeBlanc, Julie M.-A. (2019-11-05). "Branding Unibroue: Selling Québécois Folklore through Beer". The Folklorist in the Marketplace. Utah State University Press. pp. 47–71. doi:10.7330/9781607327851.c002. ISBN 978-1-60732-785-1.
- Sneath, A.W. (2001). Brewed in Canada: The Untold Story of Canada's 350-year-old Brewing Industry. Dundurn. ISBN 978-1-55002-364-0.
