= Beau's All Natural Brewing Company =

Brewery in Vankleek Hill, Ontario, Canada

Coordinates: 45.5169°N 74.6372°W

- Industry: Alcoholic beverage
- Founded: 2006
- Headquarters: Vankleek Hill, Ontario, Canada
- Products: Beer
- Website: www.beaus.ca

Beau's All Natural Brewing Company, also known as Beau's Brewing Company or simply Beau's, is a brewery in Vankleek Hill, Ontario, 50 minutes east of Ottawa.

It was launched on July 1, 2006, and is known for its "regionally famous" Lug Tread lagered ale, as well as a number of seasonal beers. Beau's beers are available throughout Ontario on tap and at LCBO liquor stores. In February 2015, the brewery has also begun selling its products in Quebec, and across Canada in 2017. By May 2016, the company had 150 full-time employees as a result of a claimed "growth at a compounded rate of 45 per cent year-over-year" since 2006.

== History ==
Beau's was started by father and son Tim and Steve Beauchesne. After having informally discussed the idea, they left their previous employment (Tim having run a textile company for 17 years, and Steve having worked for the Ontario government and running Go! Go! Go! Records) and opened Beau's on Canada Day (July 1) 2006.

Beau's has been successful since opening, having sold its entire first batch of 3,000 litres (5,300 pints) to nine Ottawa-area bars and restaurants before the official opening date. Though it originally expected to supply Lug Tread to local LCBOs and Beer Stores in 2006, Lug Tread first appeared in Ottawa LCBOs in early 2008, by which time it had expanded to over 90 establishments in the Ottawa area.

As of July 2009, over 200 Eastern Ontario establishments featured Beau's Lug Tread on tap. "Just about every LCBO in the region" sells Lug Tread. By late 2009, Beau's was supplying a number of bars and LCBOs in the Greater Toronto Area.

On January 13, 2014, it was announced by Beau's that, in March of the same year, its beer would be available for the first time in New York State, marking the first time the company's beer is available internationally.

On May 17, 2016, Steve Beauchesne, speaking as chief executive officer of Beau's, announced that the brewery would be owned by its employees in an employee stock ownership plan.

On March 1, 2022, Beau's announced that the brewery would be merged with Steam Whistle Brewing, located in Toronto, Ontario.

== Beers ==
Beau's flagship beer is Lug Tread, a Kölsch-style lagered ale that is produced alongside a year-long line up which includes Good Time Session I.P.A., Full Time I.P.A., Wag the Wolf (a White I.P.A.), the Beau's Grapefruit Radler, and Countdown Pale Ale.

The brewery also produces seasonal beers such as Beaver River I.P. Eh? (an India Pale Ale (IPA) with a "citrusy punch"); Festivale (an Altbier-style ale); Farm Table: Märzen (an Oktoberfest-style amber lager); and Bogwater (a "Strong & Spicy Dirty-Brown Ale"). Other limited and one-off beers have been released periodically under the Wild Oats Series, Farm Table Series, Gruit Series, Greener Futures Barrel-Aged Series, and Pro-Am Series.

On November 1, 2013, Beau's released The Tom Green Beer, a milk stout made in collaboration with actor and comedian Tom Green. When Green was a guest on Late Night with Jimmy Fallon, he brought the beer on-air and drank it with the host. Beau's has since expanded the Tom Green Series, which now includes the Tom Green Cherry Milk Stout, and Tom Green Summer Stout.

== Reception and awards ==
Beau's beers have been very well received, having "earned a reputation for quality and clean taste with beer drinkers who want more than just a cheap buzz," and Lug Tread having become a "fast favourite."

In its debut year, Lug Tread won "Best Beer of the Fest" at the 2006 Golden Tap Awards. Lug Tread went on to win "Best beer brewed in Ontario (outside of the GTA)" at the 2007 and 2008 Golden Tap Awards, and "Best regularly-produced craft beer brewed in Ontario" and "Best of the Fest" at the 2009 awards. The brewery itself also won "Best microbrewery in Ontario (outside of the GTA)" and "Best micro/craft brewery in Ontario" in 2008 and 2009, respectively.

At the 2009 National Organic Brewing Challenge awards, Lug Tread won 2nd place, while seasonal Night•Märzen placed 3rd. Another Beau's seasonal beer, Festivale, won gold medal at the 2009 Mondial de la Bière in Strasbourg.

== Bottles ==
Beau's sells their product in 600ml glass bottles available at the LCBO and The Beer Store in Ontario, dépanneurs throughout Quebec, and vendors across Canada. Beau's has expanded its product portfolio to include 355mL and 473mL cans.

Beau's has a partnership with Operation Come Home, an Ottawa youth program. Beer is delivered in Ottawa with assistance from youths working with Operation Come Home. The program provides the youth with job experience and income. As of May 2009, six youths have graduated the program to work in full-time jobs elsewhere.

== See also ==
- Beer in Canada
- Barrel-aged beer
