= Steam Whistle Brewing =

Canadian brewery

Coordinates: 43.641095°N 79.385265°W

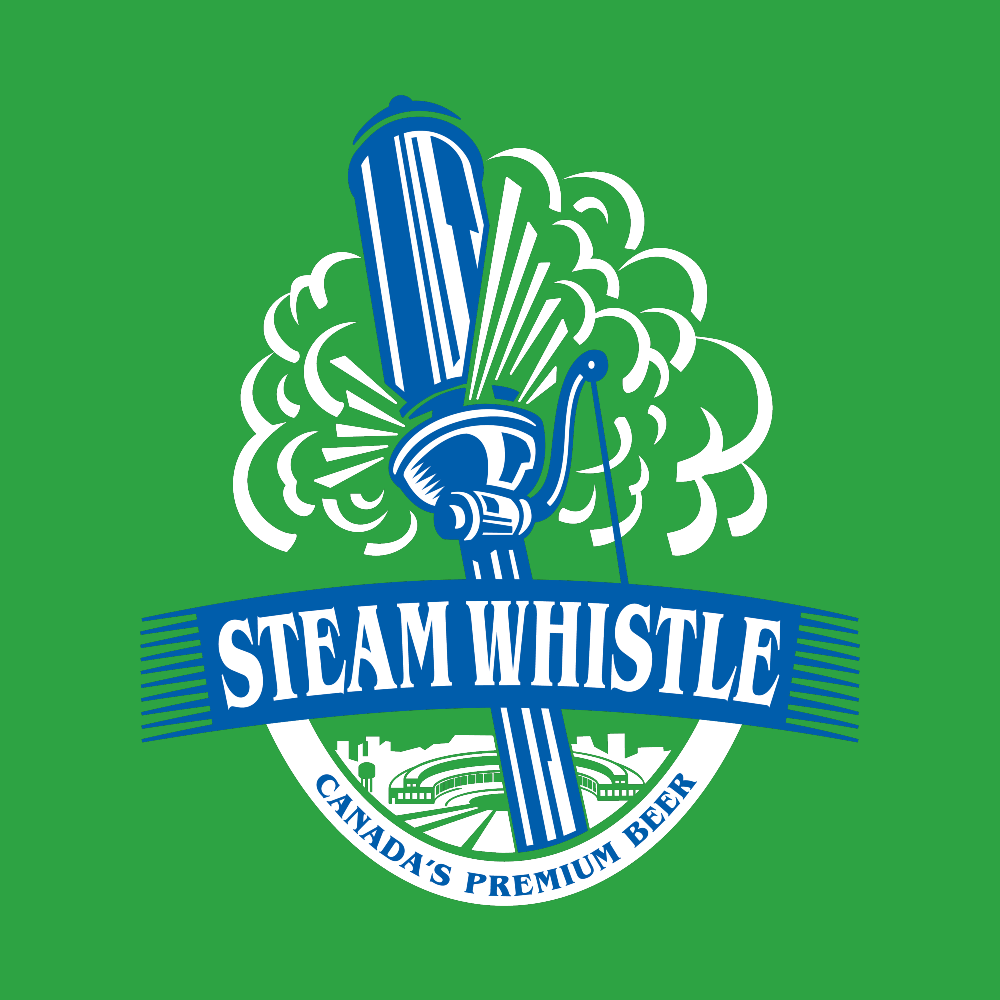
- Industry: Alcoholic beverage
- Founded: 2000
- Headquarters: Toronto, Ontario, Canada
- Products: Beer
- Production output: 80,000 hectolitres as of 2013
- Owner: Greg Taylor, Cam Heaps and Greg Cromwell (independent)
- Website: steamwhistle.ca

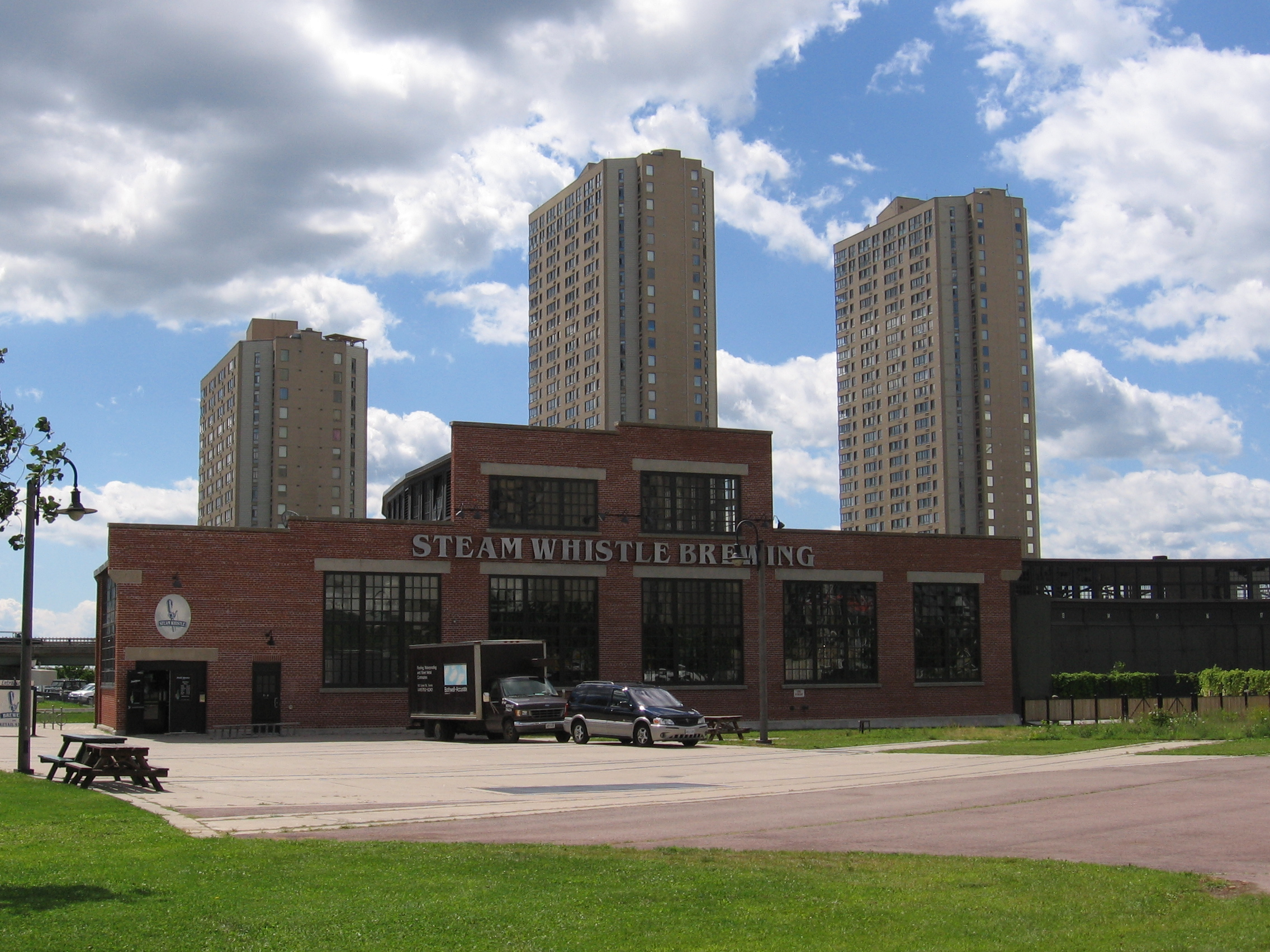
The Steam Whistle Brewing Roundhouse in Toronto, Ontario.

Steam Whistle Brewing is an independent brewery in Toronto, Ontario, Canada. It was founded in 2000 by three former employees of Upper Canada Brewing Company after that company was acquired by a larger corporation. Steam Whistle is best known for producing a single flagship beer, Steam Whistle Pilsner, which has become one of Canada's most recognized independent beers. The company also produces New Belgium Brewing Company brands for the Canadian market.

The brewery occupies Bays 1–14 in the John Street Roundhouse building at Roundhouse Park. Built in 1929, it was previously the home of a Canadian Pacific Railway steam locomotive repair facility and operated as such until May 13, 1988. The John Street Roundhouse is designated a National Historic Site and is owned by the City of Toronto. Steam Whistle's location, at the base of the CN Tower in downtown Toronto, has become both a production space and a cultural hub, hosting tours, events, a taproom and a restaurant called the “Steam Whistle Kitchen”. Each day, a working steam whistle on the brewery's roof sounds to mark the end of the workday, a tradition that ties the company's brand to the building's railway heritage.

The company operates the annual Steam Whistle's Roundhouse Winter Craft Beer Festival (RHCBF).

The brewery was the first customer of renewable energy project, the Deep Lake Water Cooling System.

== History ==
The idea for Steam Whistle originated during a camping trip, where the founders (Greg Cromwell, Greg Taylor and Cam Heaps), who were just laid off from Upper Canada Brewing Company, called themselves the “Three fired guys” or 3FG. They envisioned starting a brewery that would focus on a single premium beer brewed with time-honored techniques. From its early beginnings in 2000, the company grew from a small operation in the Roundhouse into a nationally distributed brand.

The brewery has continued to use four natural ingredients: water, malted barley, hops and yeast, while following traditional European brewing methods.

Steam Whistle has also become recognizable on Canadian streets through its retro vintage fleet, which includes restored vintage vans and trucks.

== Beer ==
Steam Whistle Pilsner is a Czech-style pilsner brewed in the Bohemian tradition. It is made with malted barley, Saaz hops, water and bottom-fermenting lager yeast. Known for its crisp finish and balanced flavour, the beer has remained the brewery's sole flagship product since its launch in 2000. Steam Whistle Pilsner is available in bottles, cans and on draught across Canada.

Starting in 2019, Steam Whistle introduced additional beer styles to their offering. This included a pale ale, a session lager, a harvest lager and a lemon shandy. However, in 2022, Steam Whistle discontinued these other beers to return to solely focus on the Steam Whistle Pilsner.

== Acquisition of Beau’s Brewing Co. ==
In November 2021, Steam Whistle Brewing and Beau's Brewing Co. began a sales and distribution partnership in Ontario, combining sales teams and logistics. Building on that success, Steam Whistle formally acquired Beau's on February 28, 2022, after Beau's shareholders approved the deal with 99.99% support.

Beau's continues to operate from its Vankleek Hill brewery. The move strengthened both breweries’ ability to compete in the Canadian craft beer market while keeping ownership independent and Canadian.

== Awards ==
Steam Whistle has won several awards, including Canada's Best Managed Companies and a 2016 Leadership Award. In 2004, Steam Whistle Pilsner was voted best beer in the Greater Toronto Area at the Golden Tap Awards and has been recognized as one of the most popular beers in Ontario. Awards for product quality include a Silver for Steam Whistle Pilsner in the 2016 Ontario Brewing Awards, a gold medal in the 2024 Ontario Brewing Awards and a gold medal at the 2012 Canadian Brewing Awards for their Steam Whistle Pilsner.

Steam Whistle Brewing was named among Toronto's best patios.
