= Sapporo Breweries =

Japanese beer-brewing company

Sapporo Holdings Limited

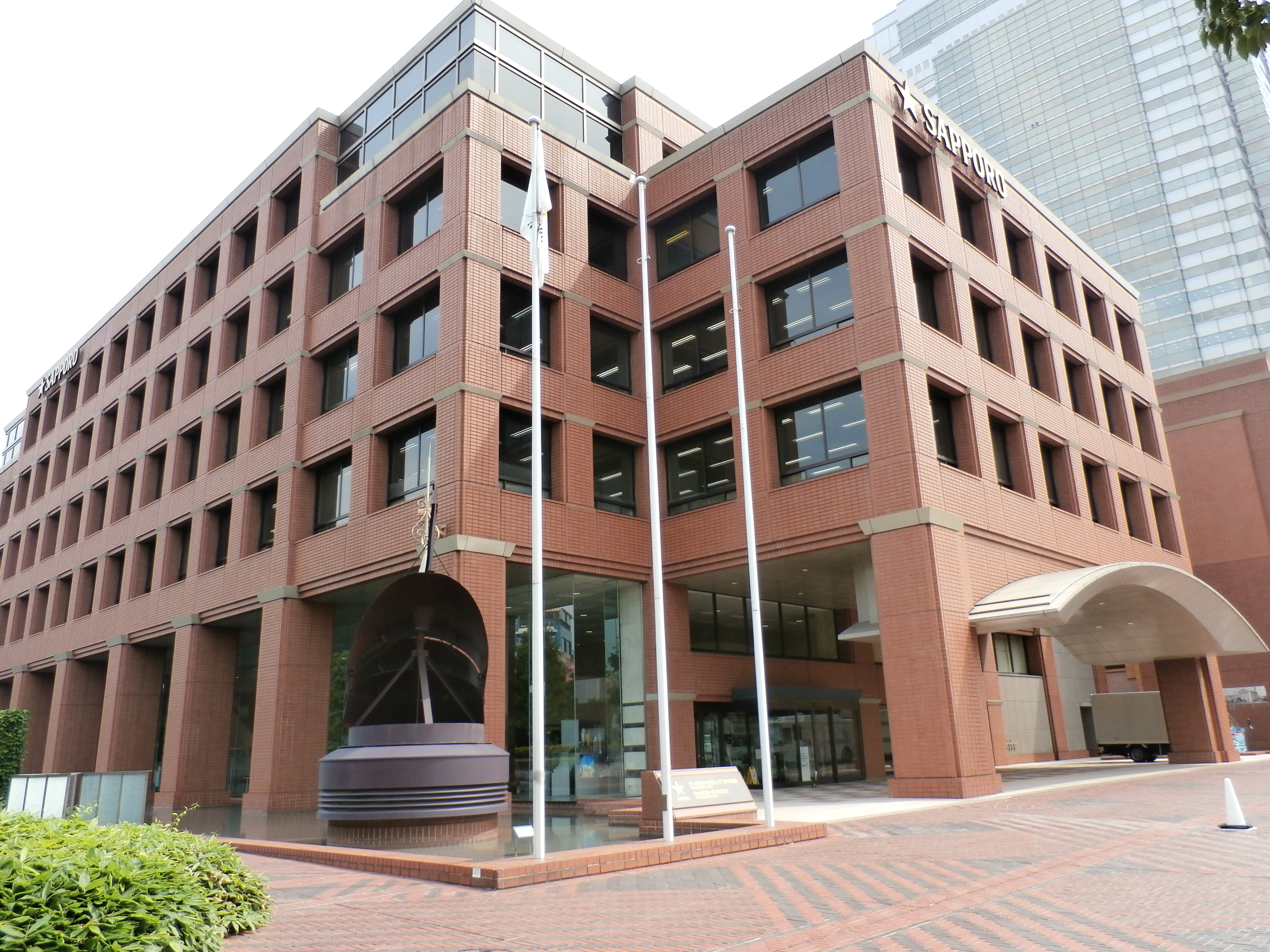
- Headquarters in Shibuya, Tokyo
- Native name: サッポロホールディングス株式会社
- Romanized name: Sapporo Hōrudingusu Kabushiki-gaisha
- Formerly: Nippon Breweries, Ltd. (1949-1964); Sapporo Breweries Limited (1964-2003)
- Type: Public
- Traded as: TYO: 2501; Nikkei 225 component
- Industry: Alcoholic beverage Food; Beverages
- Founded: 1876; 150 years ago (as Kaitakushi Beer Brewery); September 1, 1946; 80 years ago (as Nippon Beer)
- Founder: Government of Hokkaido
- Headquarters: Ebisu, Shibuya, Tokyo, Japan
- Key people: Masaki Oga (president)
- Products: Beer
- Production output: 616.374 megaliters
- Subsidiaries: Sapporo Breweries; Pokka Sapporo; Sleeman Breweries; Anchor Brewing Company; Stone Brewing
- Website: www.sapporoholdings.jp/english/

Sapporo Breweries Limited
- Native name: サッポロビール株式会社
- Romanized name: Sapporo Bīru Kabushiki-gaisha
- Type: Subsidiary
- Industry: Alcoholic beverage
- Founded: July 1, 2003; 23 years ago
- Headquarters: Ebisu, Shibuya, Tokyo, Japan
- Products: Beer
- Owner: Sapporo Holdings Limited
- Website: www.sapporobeer.jp/english/

Sapporo Breweries Limited (サッポロビール株式会社, Sapporo Bīru Kabushiki-gaisha) is a Japanese beer brewing company founded in 1876. Sapporo, the oldest brand of beer in Japan, was first brewed in Sapporo, Hokkaido, in 1876 by Seibei Nakagawa. The world headquarters of Sapporo Breweries is in Ebisu, Shibuya, Tokyo. The company purchased the Canadian company Sleeman Breweries in 2006.

Sapporo Breweries has five breweries in Japan, the Sleeman brewery in Guelph, Ontario, Canada and Sapporo Brewing Company in La Crosse, Wisconsin, U.S. The main brands are Sapporo Draft; Yebisu; and Sleeman Cream Ale. Sapporo Premium has been the best-selling Asian beer in the United States since Sapporo U.S.A., Inc. was founded in 1984.

In 2003, Sapporo Breweries restructured into a holding company, Sapporo Holdings Limited (Note: サッポロホールディングス株式会社, Sapporo Hōrudingusu Kabushiki-gaisha), with the brewery division taken over by the second incarnation of Sapporo Breweries. Sapporo Breweries is a member of the Mitsui keiretsu.

== History ==
Sapporo Breweries originated in Sapporo, Hokkaido, during the Meiji period, where the Kaitakushi established many businesses. Seibei Nakagawa, a Germany-trained brewer, became the first brewmaster of the Kaitakushi Brewery in June 1876, and the first Sapporo Lager was produced at that time following the completion of the plant in September of that year. Privatized in 1886, the Sapporo brewery became the centerpiece for the Sapporo Beer Company.

In 1887, another company, the Nippon Beer Brewery Company, was established in Mita, Meguro, Tokyo, and began producing Yebisu Beer. The competition between Sapporo and Nippon Beer, as well as competition with the Osaka (now Asahi) and Kirin breweries led to a 1906 merger of Sapporo, Nippon, and Osaka breweries into the Dai-Nippon Beer Company, Ltd. (大日本麦酒株式会社), which formed a near monopoly on the Japanese market until after World War II.

After 1949, Dai-Nippon was split into Nippon and Asahi breweries, with the Nippon Breweries resuming production of Sapporo beer in 1956 and renaming itself to the present name, Sapporo Breweries, in 1964. Yebisu Beer was relaunched as a separate brand in 1971, marketed as a German-style barley beer. Sapporo Black Label beer was launched in 1977.

In 2006, Sapporo announced that it would be acquiring Canadian brewer Sleeman in a $400-million all-cash deal.

On February 15, 2007, Steel Partners Japan Strategic Fund, a Cayman Islands-registered fund management subsidiary of Warren Lichtenstein's Steel Partners and the biggest shareholder (18.6% as of Feb. 2007) of Sapporo Holdings, submitted a proposal to the company seeking approval to raise its stake to 66.6%.

On 3 August 2017, it was announced that Sapporo Brewing Company would be acquiring Anchor Brewing.

In 2020, Sapporo Breweries won the Lausanne Index Prize - Best of Packaging.

Despite its name, Sapporo beer is not exclusively brewed in Sapporo. Sapporo is also brewed in Sendai, Chiba, Shizuoka, and Kyushu. Most Sapporo beer sold in North America had been brewed at the Sleeman brewery in Guelph, Ontario, Canada. Sapporo completed a $165 million dollar buyout of Stone Brewing Co. in September 2022, acquiring Stone's brewing facilities in Escondido, California and Richmond, Virginia. The Richmond, VA facility is currently undergoing $33 million in capital upgrades, after which it will make about 50% of their total United States output.

In 2023, shortly after the acquisition of Stone Brewing Co. and in the midst of stalled union contract renewal negotiations, Sapporo announced they would be ceasing operations of Anchor Brewing and liquidating its assets.

In July 2026, Sapporo Holdings absorbed its brewery subsidiary and adopted the Sapporo Breweries name. The group had transferred 51% of its real estate subsidiary to a PAG–KKR-backed vehicle in June, the first stage of a planned property exit.

== Breweries ==
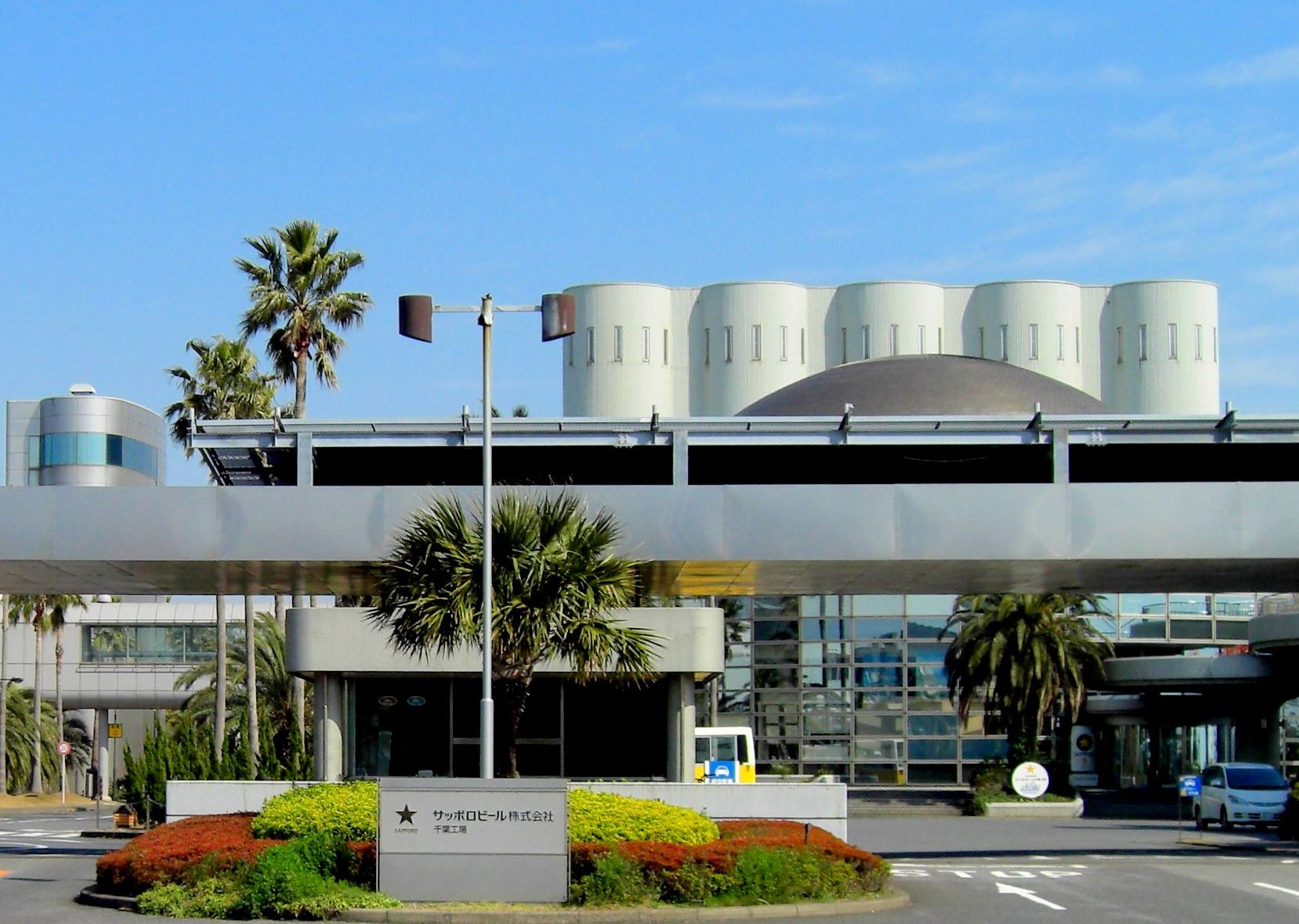
Chiba Brewery

=== Japan ===
Sapporo has five breweries in Japan. The first, Sendai Brewery, was opened in 1971 in Natori, Miyagi, and was among the first to use a computerised brewing system. Shizuoka Brewery in Yaizu was opened in 1980, Chiba Brewery in Chiba was opened in 1988, Hokkaido Brewery in Eniwa, Hokkaido was built in 1989, and the Kyushu Hita Brewery was opened in Hita, Ōita in 2000.

=== Canada ===
Sleeman Breweries was purchased by Sapporo Brewery in 2006 for $400 million. Sleeman was restarted in 1988 in Guelph, Ontario, Canada by the great grandson of John H. Sleeman, the owner of the original Sleeman brewery founded in 1834. The first Sleeman brewery ceased operations by 1933, when their liquor license was revoked for bootlegging, specifically, smuggling beer into Detroit, Michigan. The company's current products are based on the family's original recipes, and recipes from Unibroue (which brewery Sleeman had previously purchased). Sleeman Breweries / Sapporo Canada currently consists of four Canadian breweries: Sleeman in Guelph, Ontario, Okanagan Spring in Vernon, British Columbia, Unibroue in Chambly, Quebec, and Wild Rose Brewery in Calgary, Alberta. As of 2017, Sleeman Breweries also owned 4.2% of The Beer Store.

=== United States ===
In the United States, Sapporo operates as Sapporo U.S.A., Inc., established in 1984.

Sapporo beers are brewed, canned, and bottled for Sapporo Brewing Company by City Brewing Company in La Crosse, Wisconsin.

On 3 August 2017, it was announced that Sapporo Breweries would acquire the Anchor Brewing Company. In June 2022, Stone and Sapporo announced that they had reached an agreement for Sapporo to purchase Stone Brewing for $168 million, with the purchase expected to close in August 2022. The acquisition has since closed. In July 2023, it was announced that Anchor would shut down and liquidate assets.

=== Vietnam ===
The Sapporo Vietnam brewery is situated in Đức Hòa, Long An. Its products include 650ml cans of premium beer for the Australian and Mexican market. Sapporo Beer sold in 650ml cans in California are no longer brewed in Vietnam.

== Brands ==
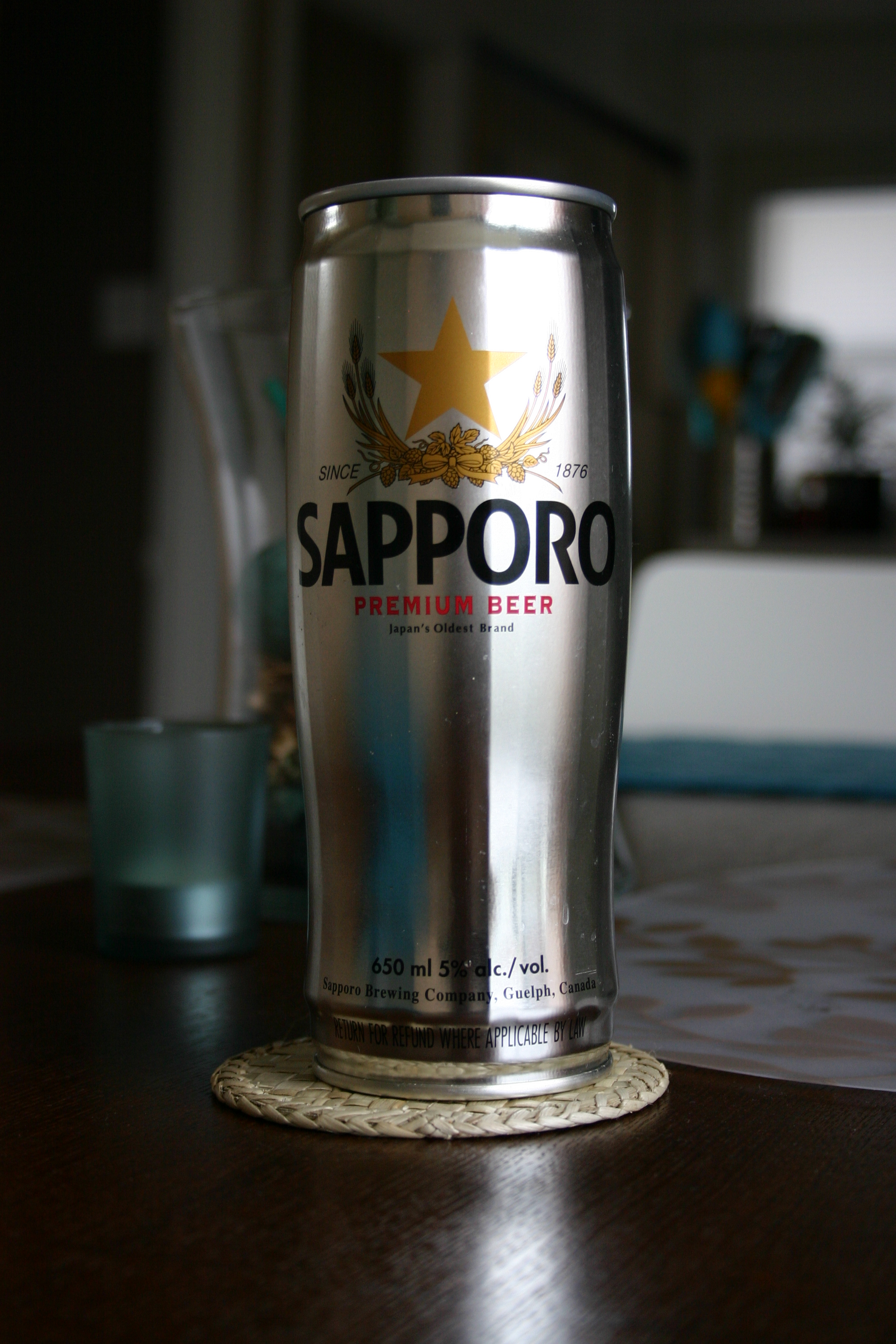
A can of Sapporo Premium

The company produces a range of pale and dark lagers, including Sapporo Draft (Premium in North America) and Yebisu. In the Sleeman brewery in Canada they brew Sleeman branded beers such as Sleeman Cream Ale, as well as Sapporo Premium.

The company also produces a malt based soft drink, Super Clear, which was launched in 2002 as a low-alcohol beer, then changed in September 2009 to an alcohol free malt drink.

=== Yebisu ===
Yebisu (ヱビス, Ebisu) is one of Japan's oldest brands, first brewed in Tokyo in 1890 by the Japan Beer Brewery Company. Through a complicated set of mergers and divisions, the brand was acquired and eventually retained by the modern-day Sapporo Brewery. The brand lay dormant during the post-World War II era, until it was resurrected in 1971. It has been brewed continuously ever since.

Yebisu comes in two main varieties: Yebisu (Premium), a Dortmunder/export lager, and Yebisu Black, a dark lager. There are also occasional special varieties that are limited in distribution area and time. In April 2007, for example, there was a green-label "The Hop" variety.

The modern-day Yebisu is positioned as Sapporo's "luxury" beer label. Sapporo describes it as a beer brand with "a touch of class". It is a 100% malt beer.

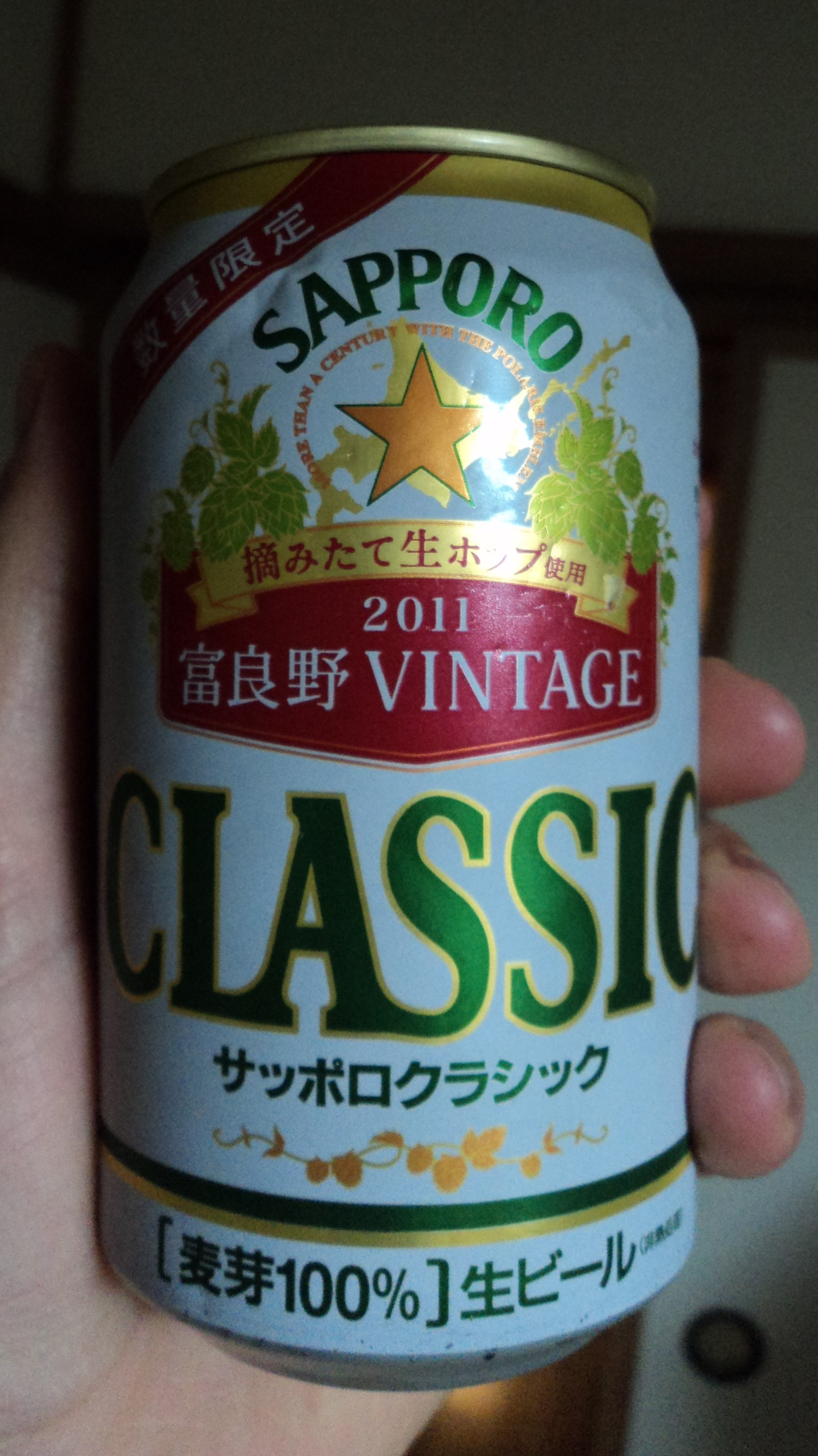
A Japan-only yearly "vintage" release

Yebisu is notable in that its Japanese name includes the now-obsolete kana character we (ヱ or ゑ) for the even-older ye reading, an anachronism in keeping with historical kana orthography. This can lead to confusion when romanized, as the "Y" is not pronounced. The Tokyo neighborhood of Ebisu was named for the beer, which was originally produced there, though its name is spelled with a conventional e kana instead of we. The pronunciations of "Yebisu" and "Ebisu" are the same.

=== Space Barley ===
Using barley grown from seeds which spent five months on board the International Space Station in 2006, Sapporo created a limited Space Barley brew. The project was a joint one between the Russian Academy of Sciences, Okayama University, and Sapporo. Tasters described the flavour as no different from similar beers, which researchers point to as important in showing that producing food in space for long duration flights is possible. Six packs of the space beer were sold in a lottery system for 10,000 yen.

== See also ==
- Sapporo Beer Museum - The museum run by the Sapporo Brewery, located in Sapporo, Japan
- Sapporo Factory - A shopping mall which used to be a brewery owned by the Sapporo Brewery
- Beer in Japan
