= Mill Street Brewery =

Canadian brewery based in Toronto

- Industry: Alcoholic drink
- Founded: 2002
- Headquarters: Toronto, Ontario, Canada
- Number of locations: Toronto, Ottawa
- Area served: Toronto, Ottawa, Manitoba, Saskatchewan
- Products: Beer
- Owner: Labatt Brewing Company
- Website: http://www.millstreetbrewery.com

Mill Street Brewery is a brewery in Toronto, Ontario, Canada that is a part of Anheuser–Busch InBev and named after Mill Street where its first brewpub is located. During its first decade of operation, as an independent brewer, Mill Street won several awards including Golden Tap Awards for Best Toronto Microbrewery ('04-'08) and Best Toronto Beer (for Tankhouse Ale: '04-'07), and was named "Canadian Brewery of the Year" at the Canadian Brewing Awards in 2007, 2008, and 2009. It was purchased in 2015 by Canadian brewer Labatt Brewing Company, which in turn is owned by the global brewing giant Anheuser–Busch InBev.

== History ==
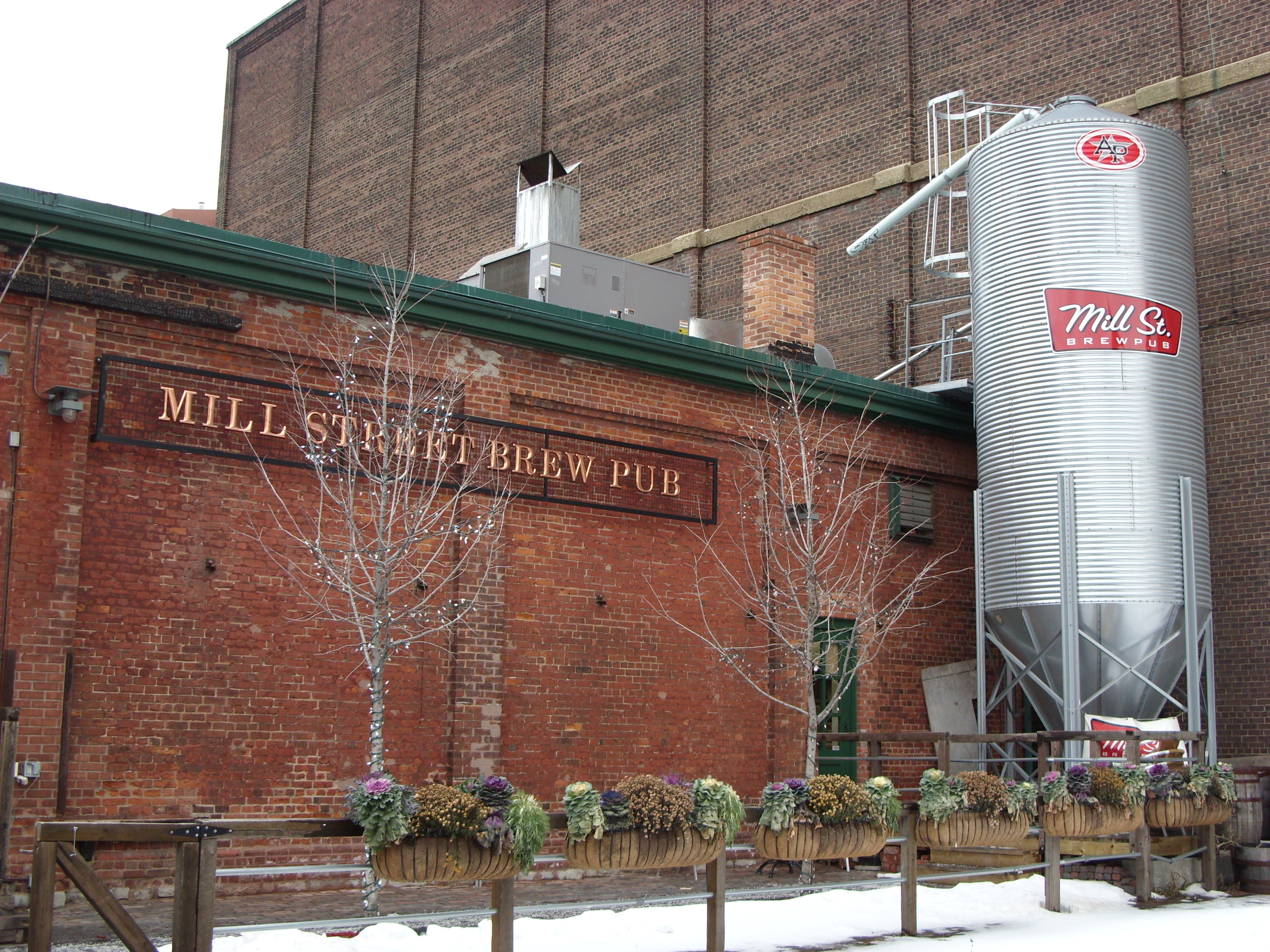
Rear of the Mill Street Brewery Brew Pub in Toronto

The brewery was founded in December 2002 in Toronto by Steve Abrams, Jeff Cooper and Michael Duggan. The brewery was named after its original location at 55 Mill Street in the historic Distillery District, the former industrial complex occupied by spirits maker Gooderham and Worts. In early 2006, all large-scale brewing of the major brands was moved to a larger facility in Scarborough, Ontario.

The Distillery District location reopened in October 2006 as a brewpub, which featured a wide range of Mill Street beers on draught, including seasonal and other special/one-off releases. In 2007, co-founder Michael Duggan felt the company was diverging from its original vision, and left to start his own brewery.

In 2011, the company leased a historic grist mill building adjacent to the Chaudière Falls in Ottawa that is owned by the National Capital Commission and had most recently housed the Old Mill Restaurant, which had closed in 2007. Mill Street converted the space into a brewpub. The same year, Mill Street opened a pub in Terminal 1 of Toronto Pearson International Airport, becoming the first craft brewer to open a bar/restaurant in a major Canadian airport.

In spring 2013, Mill Street expanded their Distillery District operation by adding a distillery that distilled schnapps from beer.

In 2015, Mill Street was purchased by Labatt, which is itself owned by brewing giant Anheuser-Busch InBev. As part of the purchase agreement, Labatt agreed to invest $10 million into brewing operations to help expand into Quebec. Due to the takeover, the Ontario Craft Brewers no longer considered Mill St. to be an independent craft brewer and removed Mill St. from its membership. Large-scale brewing was moved from Scarborough to a facility in North York capable of producing 250,000 hectolitres per year.

In 2021, another of the original co-founders, Steve Abrams, left the company.

In March 2025, Labatt closed Mill Street's North York brewery, laying off 39 employees. Production of Mill Street's major brands moved to the Labatt brewery in London, Ontario.
