= Unibroue =

Canadien brewery

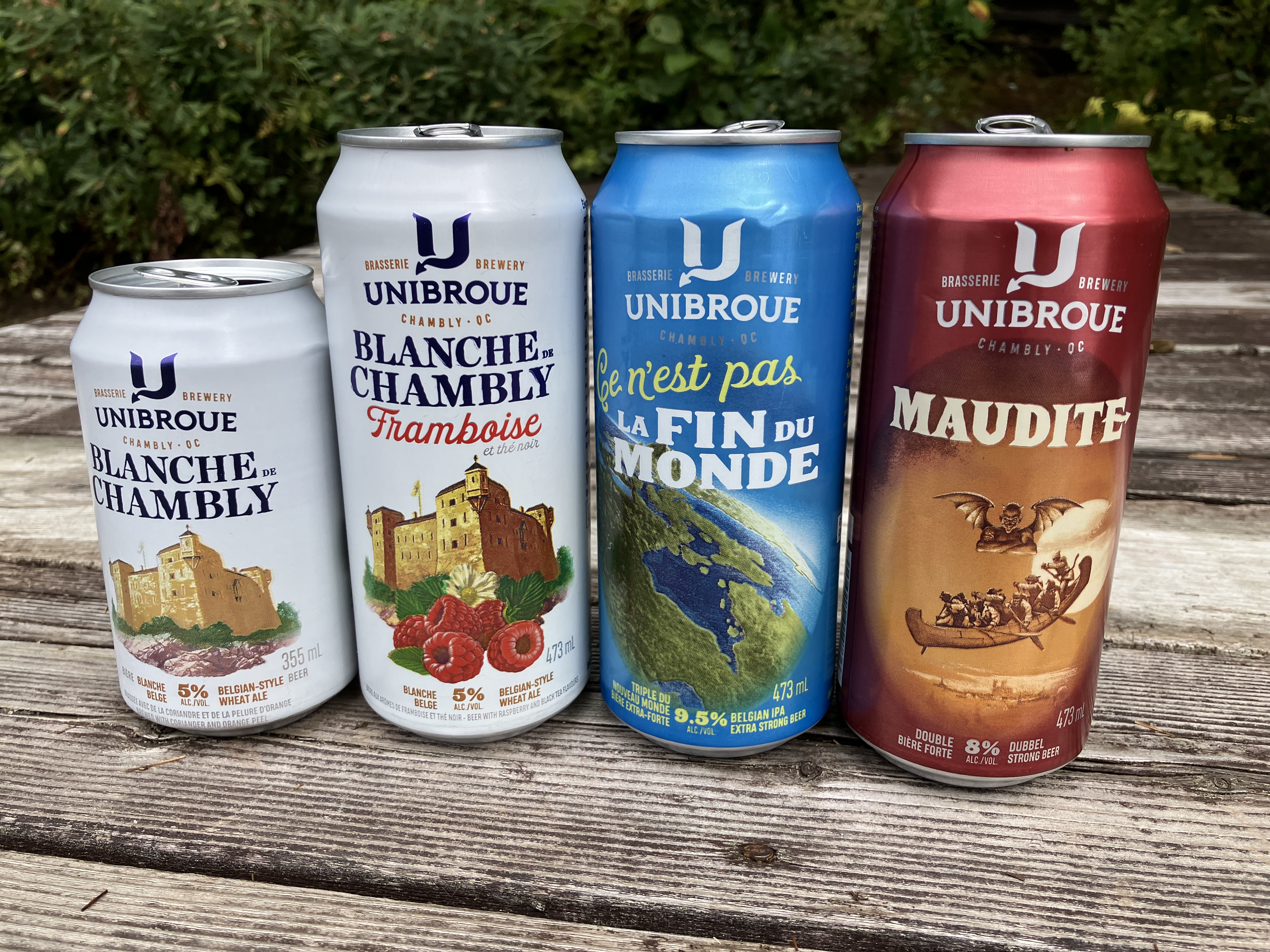
- Founded: 1993
- Headquarters: Chambly, Quebec; Canada
- Owner: Sapporo Brewery
- Website: www.unibroue.com

Unibroue is a brewery in Chambly, Quebec, Canada, that was started by Serge Racine and Quebec native André Dion. The company was purchased by Sleeman Breweries Ltd. in 2004, which was itself taken over by Sapporo in 2006.

== History ==
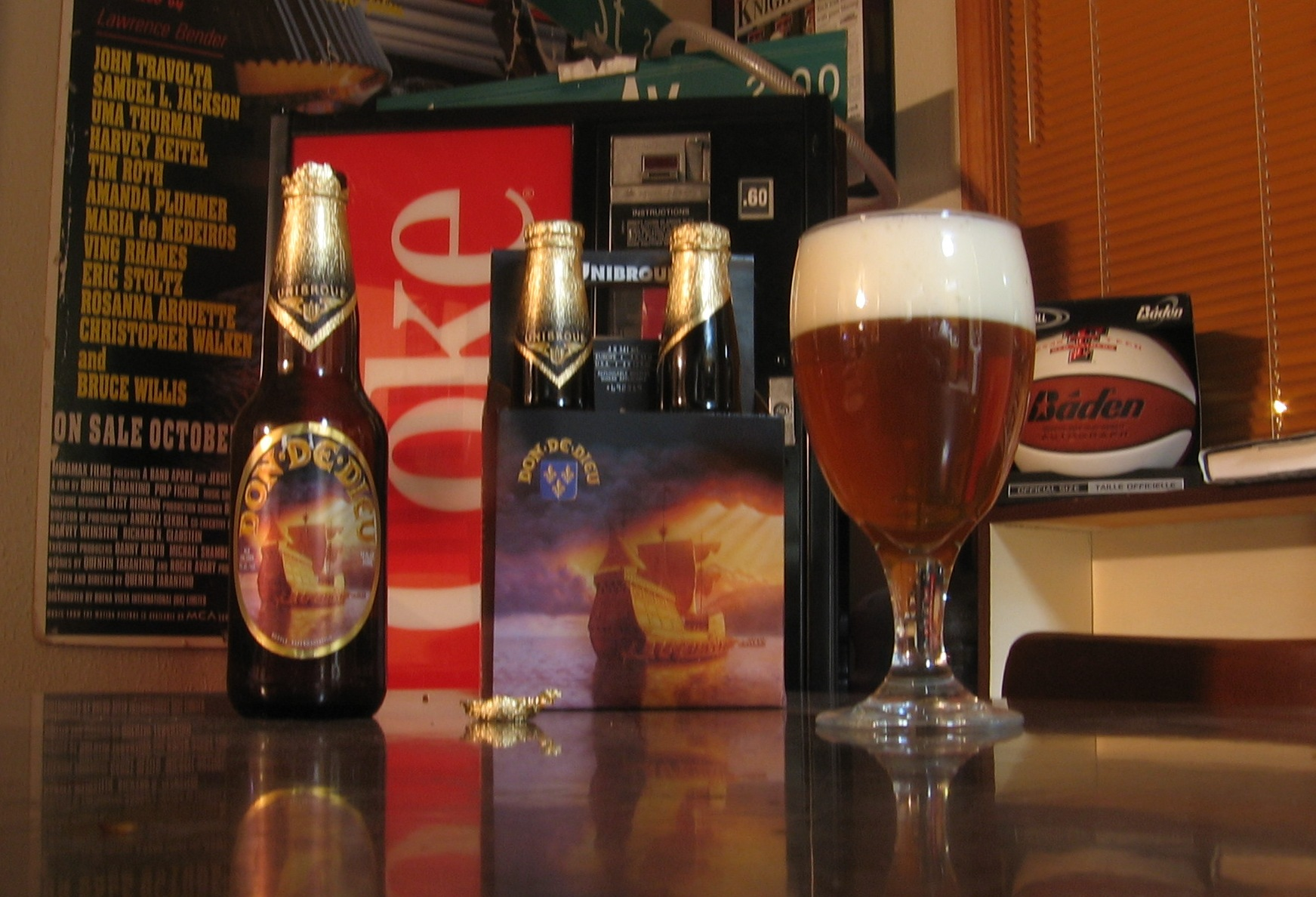
One product in the Unibroue line is Don de Dieu

Unibroue was founded by business partners André Dion and Serge Racine who had acquired 75% of La Brasserie Massawippi Inc. of Lennoxville, the initiator of the micro-brewery movement in Québec, in 1990. The two purchased the remainder of the shares at the end of 1991 when they transferred their interest in La Brasserie Massawippi Inc. to Unibroue. The original goal of the two entrepreneurs was to improve distribution for the few emerging craft breweries in Quebec. When other breweries left the project, Unibroue shifted towards brewing entirely. According to Pierre Clermont, a knowledgeable observer of Quebec beer, "since there was a moratorium on brewing licenses, Unibroue bought Massawippi to be able to brew their own beer. By purchasing the brewery, they automatically acquired the brewing license, Br-008."

By 1992, La Brasserie Massawippi Inc. became a wholly owned subsidiary of Unibroue. Afterward, it changed its corporate name to Brasserie Broubec Inc. and in July 1993 merged with Unibroue. It was bought by Canadian brewer, Sleeman Breweries Ltd., in 2004. Sleeman, in turn, was purchased in 2006 by Sapporo.

== Beers ==
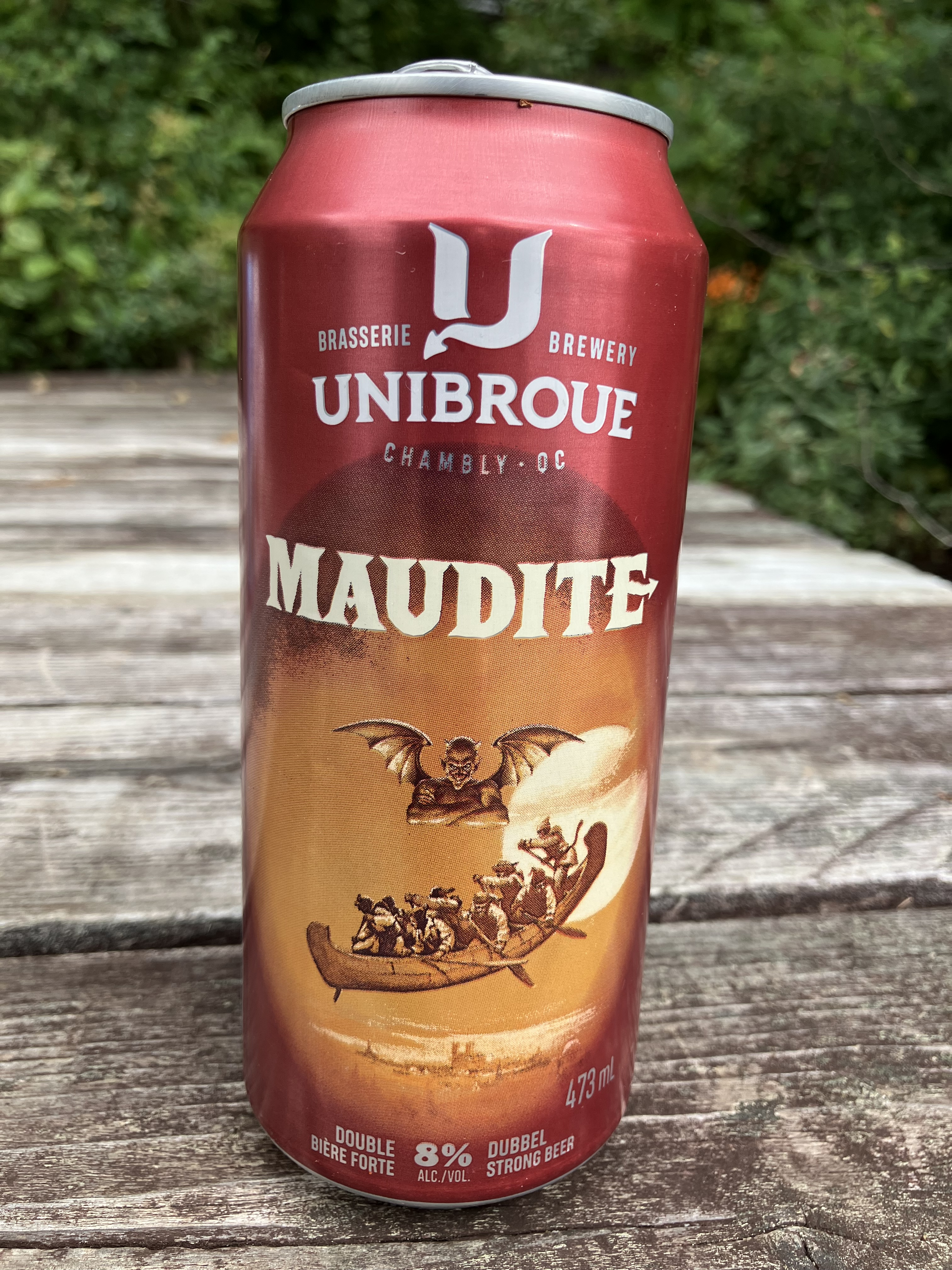
"Maudite"

Unibroue makes a wide range of beers, although there is a focus on Belgian-style brews, such as their Maudite ('Damned'), La Fin du Monde ('The End of the World'), and Don de Dieu ('Gift from God'). Most of Unibroue's beers are bottled "on the lees", or containing yeast sediment (or lees). This practice provides additional fermentation, also called bottle-conditioned, after bottling. The result is a beer which ages well if kept in the dark and unrefrigerated, and allows it to be shipped relatively cheaply to international markets. The yeast gives Unibroue beers a cloudy appearance and provides a characteristic element to the taste. On many of their labels, suggested serving temperatures (for example, "better at 12°–14°C") are included.

Recently, Unibroue shifted to more conventional styles with a series of lighter beer cans inspired by their original, heavier Belgian beers to renew with a younger customer base. Recent addition include la Petite Maudite, a brown ale, and Saison Libre, a saison light beer. As with its classics brews, recent additions also typically refer to Quebec's history and folk traditions.

== Selected beers ==
=== La Fin du Monde ===
La Fin du Monde (French for "the end of the world") is a Belgian-style tripel and bottle conditioned golden ale introduced in July 1994.

=== Saison Libre ===
A 4.0% ABV light Saison beer in reference to Quebec's Quiet Revolution in the sixties.

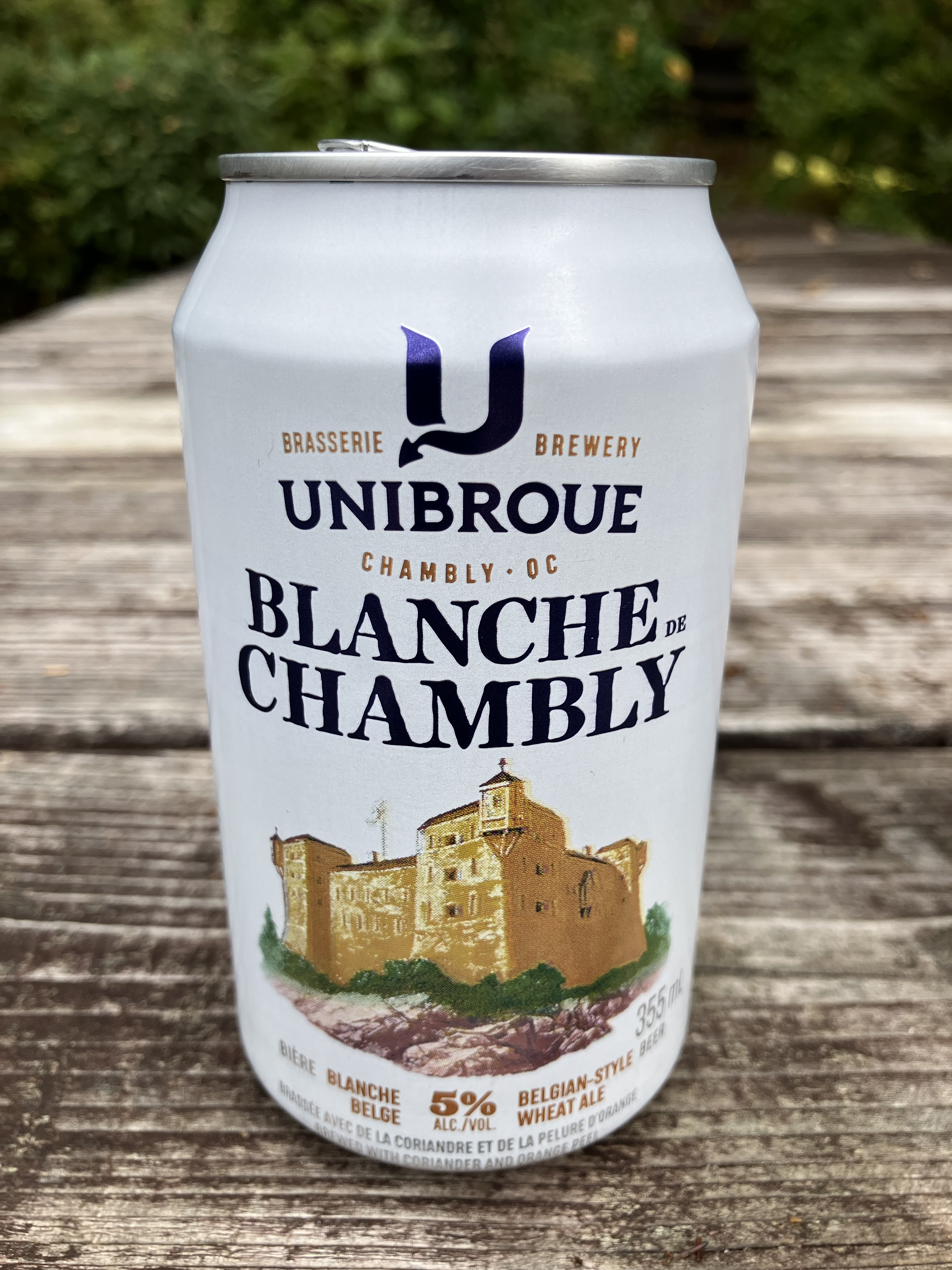
Blanche Chambly

=== Blanche de Chambly ===
Blanche de Chambly is a 5% ABV Belgian-style wheat beer ("witbier"), introduced in 1992, which has won many medals since.

== Awards ==
La Fin du Monde has been the winner of many medals of excellence: 5 platinum, 6 gold, and 1 silver from the Beverage Testing Institute since its introduction in 1994. In 2004 it won the gold medal at the Los Angeles County Fair for Belgian-Style Abbey Ale.

Don de Dieu has won four gold medals from the Beverage Testing Institute since its introduction in 1998.

Grande Réserve 17 received the "World's best dark ale" award at the World Beer Awards in London, England in 2011. Also, it received a Platinum medal from the Beverage Testing Institute in 2009, 2010, and 2011.

Unibroue has won several awards in subsequent years too, at the World Beer Awards. In 2015, for example, the company's products received many accolades. La Fin du Monde was declared World's Best Belgian Style Tripel, La Résolution and Éphémère Poire (pear), La Résolution won The Americas' Best Belgian Style Strong and Éphémère Poire was named The Americas' Best Fruit Flavored Beer. The Unibroue 17 Grande Réserve was declared The Americas’ Best Vintage Dark Beer and the company won three gold medals for Terrible, Maudite, Éphémère Pomme, three silver medals for Blanche de Chambly, Trois Pistoles, Noire de Chambly, and a bronze medal for Blonde de Chambly.

At the 2016 Awards, the company won the following World's Best awards: Belgian Style Strong Dark, Unibroue Trois Pistoles and Belgian Style Tripel, Unibroue La Fin Du Monde. Conventional awards for Unibroue products included Belgian Style Strong Dark - Silver Medal, Fruit & Vegetable Flavoured Beer - Silver Medal, Belgian Style Witbier - Gold Medal.

== See also ==
- Quebec beer

== Sources ==
- LeBlanc, Julie M.-A. (2019-11-05). "Branding Unibroue: Selling Québécois Folklore through Beer". The Folklorist in the Marketplace. Utah State University Press. doi:10.7330/9781607327851.c002. ISBN 978-1-60732-785-1.
