= Wild Rose Brewery =

Beer brewery in Calgary, Canada

Coordinates: 51.014600°N 114.122895°W

- Industry: Brewing
- Founded: 1996 in Calgary, Alberta, Canada
- Founders: Mike Tymchuk; Alan Yule
- Area served: Alberta
- Products: Beer
- Parent: Sleeman Breweries (2019–present)
- Website: wildrosebrewery.com

Wild Rose Brewery, established in 1996 as an independent craft brewery in Calgary, Alberta, Canada, is now a part of Sapporo Breweries of Japan.

== History ==
Wild Rose Brewery was founded in 1996 by Mike Tymchuk and Alan Yule. The brewery was initially located in Foothills Industrial Park, and only produced draught beer for sale in bars. In 2002 the brewery began bottling beer in 1 L flip-top bottles.

In 2006 the brewery moved to Building AF23 at Currie Barracks. The building, a Quonset hut originally built as a clothing supply store, was renovated to include not only the brewery but also the Taproom—an on-site pub. Upon having moved to the new location the brewery also expanded their business into bottling their products in 341 mL bottles.

The brewery's increased popularity and doubts whether their lease at Currie Barracks would be renewed prompted the company to relocate the bulk of their production to a new location in Foothills Industrial Park (less than 1 km from Big Rock Brewery) in 2013. Their most popular beers are produced at the new facility, while certain seasonal and limited edition beers are still produced in small batches at the Currie Barracks facility, and rotating "Tap Room Cask" and "Brewers Tap" beers are available on tap only at the Taproom.

In the spring of 2015 Wild Rose began packaging their beers in cans for the first time.

In 2019, shareholders of Wild Rose Brewery voted to accept a takeover offer from Sleeman Breweries, which is itself owned by Sapporo Breweries of Japan. Due to its loss of independent ownership, Wild Rose was immediately removed from the Alberta Small Brewers Association.

== Beers ==
Wild Rose brews a set of 'core' beers, which are widely distributed on-tap in bars and available in liquor stores throughout Alberta:

- Velvet Fog - an unfiltered Canadian wheat ale. This beer is a blend of 50% wheat malt and 50% barley, giving this beer a hazy, golden color with a smooth, citrusy taste.
- Wraspberry Ale - a wheat ale infused with real raspberries. The thousands of raspberries used in each batch give this crisp, easy drink beer a tart twist.
- IPA - an India Pale Ale; also known as Industrial Pale Ale. A copper colored beer with lots of malt and hops, giving this beer a balanced, hoppy taste.
- Electric Avenue - an Alberta Blonde. A well-balanced, crisp, and crushable blonde.
- Barracks Brown - a brown ale. This dark colored beer has strong notes of espresso and cocoa while still being crisp and approachable.
- High Harvest - an unfiltered strong Pale ale that contains hemp flour. The hemp flour gives this beer a smooth mouthfeel with strong notes of tropical and citrus hops.
- Sun Scout - a hazy Indian session ale. The use of dry-hopping provides this beer with a tropical and juicy taste without being to bitter.
- Big Hoodoo - Alberta craft Lager. A light, straw colored beer with a crisp and mellow taste.

These core beers are also available in variety packs:

- The Herd - A package of 8 cans, 2 of each of the following: Wraspberry Ale, Velvet Fog, Sun Scout, and Big Hoodoo.

Other Wild Rose beers are only available on-tap:

- WRed Wheat - a North American-style dark Wheat ale. The distinctive red-amber color with caramel sweetness gives this beer a bready, well balanced taste.
- Alberta Crude - an oatmeal stout. Black as its namesake, this beer creamy taste and low carbonation gives it a complex, silky taste.
- Ponderosa Gose - a Tropical Gose. A wheat beer base with passion fruit, salt and coriander, this unfiltered beer tastes like the tropics.

A wide variety of seasonal and limited edition beers are also produced. Some of these include:

- Cherry Porter - Only available in winter; An American-style porter. Brewed with a blend of sweet and sour cherries, the roasted malt gives this beer a lightly smoky character with sweet chocolate notes, reminiscent of Black Forest cake.
- Citrus Howl - A Key Lime Kettle Sour. Through the use of Kettle Souring, this beer is tangy and tart, using real key lime juice to balance the flavours.

== Accolades ==
Wild Rose's Cherry Porter has been recognized as a top beer by several books including 1001 Beers You Must Taste Before You Die and World's Best Beers: One Thousand Craft Brews from Cask to Glass.

It was also the only Alberta brewery to be recognized at the 2008 Canadian Brewing Awards, winner of two silver medals for its wheat beer (Velvet Fog) and its barley wine. The brewery also received two bronze medals at the 2015 Canadian Brewing Awards for Electric Avenue lager and Natural Born Keller kellerbier.

The Taproom was voted Best Brew Pub, Best Local Brew many times since 2007 by the now-defunct FFWD Weekly..

== See also ==
- Beer in Canada
