= New Belgium Brewing Company =

American beer brewery

- Type: National Brand
- Industry: Brewing
- Founded: 1991; 35 years ago
- Founder: Jeff Lebesch, Kim Jordan
- Headquarters: Fort Collins, Colorado, United States
- Number of locations: 2 breweries: Fort Collins, CO, and Asheville, NC
- Area served: Distributed nationwide in the U.S.
- Key people: Shaun Belongie (CEO)
- Products: Beer
- Production output: 957,968 US barrels (2016)
- Revenue: $245 Million (est.) in 2015
- Number of employees: 703 (2018)
- Parent: Kirin
- Website: www.newbelgium.com

New Belgium Brewing Company is a nationally distributed brewery in the United States. The brand produces Fat Tire Ale, Voodoo Ranger IPA, Mural Agua Fresca Cerveza, and La Folie Sour Brown Ale, among other regular and seasonal beer varieties. Founded by Kim Jordan and Jeff Lebesch in 1991 in Fort Collins, Colorado, the company expanded to Asheville, North Carolina, in 2016 and Denver, Colorado, in 2018.

== History ==
New Belgium Brewing Company was founded in 1991 by Kim Jordan and Jeff Lebesch. Lebesch left the company in 2009.

The Fat Tire recipe originates from a co-founder's bicycle trip through Belgium from brewery to brewery. The company promotes its Fat Tire ale locally by the public placement of colorful vintage bicycles outside its brewery, which is located adjacent to the public bike path along the Cache La Poudre River.

In 1999, New Belgium became the first wind-powered brewery in the United States.

Before 2002, New Belgium distributed in only 16 states; by 2015, it had become the fourth-largest craft brewer in the country and the eighth-overall largest brewer in the United States.

As of August 2017, New Belgium beers were available in all 50 states.

As of February 2018, New Belgium was distributed in Canada, Australia, Japan, South Korea, Sweden and Norway.

In 2019, New Belgium was acquired by the Australian subsidiary of Kirin beverage group of Japan, Lion.

In January 2023, New Belgium changed the recipe of its flagship Fat Tire ale, changing it from an amber ale to a lighter colored crisper ale.

In early 2023, New Belgium acquired a production brewery in Daleville, Virginia from Constellation Brands, where they will focus on brewing Voodoo Ranger's Juice Force IPA and Fruit Force IPA.

On June 13, 2023, New Belgium Brewing CEO Steve Fechheimer stepped down after six years. CFO Danielle McLarnon was named interim CEO while they search for a new CEO for the company.

In September 2023, New Belgium integrated an industrial heat pump which is projected to reduce its greenhouse gases as well as its overall carbon footprint.

In March 2024, a new beer was developed in collaboration with frozen pizza company Tombstone called I(Pizza)A for National Beer Day.

== Business and production ==
New Belgium's main brewery is in Fort Collins, Colorado. In 2013, New Belgium had some 480 employees and more than $180 million in sales. 2016 saw new additions to the brand, debuts of Voodoo Ranger and Day Blazer line.

Esquire selected Fat Tire Amber Ale as one of the "Best Canned Beers to Drink Now" in a February 2012 article.

In May 2014, New Belgium began work on a second brewery in Asheville, North Carolina, which became fully operational in May 2016. The brewery is positioned along the French Broad River on Craven Street in Asheville's River Arts District. New Belgium's brewery, which is 133,000 sq ft (12,400 m^{2}), has capacity to produce up to a half-million barrels of beer.

In Canada New Belgium has a partnership with Steam Whistle Brewing of Toronto. Steam Whistle brews Vodoo Ranger IPA and Fat Tire in their Toronto Brewery for the Canadian Market.

In July 2024, Kirin announced that it was moving its production from Anheuser-Busch to New Belgium Brewing Company, starting in 2025.

== Label design ==
Most of New Belgium's beer labels were initially designed by Anne Fitch, a watercolorist whose work appeared on all New Belgium beers for 19 years.

In 2006, New Belgium changed its logo because it realized that beer drinkers could identify the Fat Tire label, but "didn't recognize the brewery label, or make the connection that New Belgium brewed Fat Tire and other best-selling brands, such as Sunshine Wheat." The company's new logo "pays homage to the well-known Fat Tire brand bicycle" drawn by Anne Fitch. Kim Jordan, the president of New Belgium Brewery, credits the success of the company in part on Fitch's artwork: "Our beers were good, our labels were interesting to people, and we pretty quickly had a fairly robust following." In 2010, however, New Belgium unveiled its four-beer Explore Series, whose labels featured a different design.
