= Sleeman Breweries =

Japanese-owned Canadian brewery

Sleeman Breweries Ltd.
- Type: Subsidiary
- Industry: Alcoholic drink
- Founded: 1984
- Founder: John W. Sleeman
- Headquarters: Guelph, Ontario, Canada
- Products: Beer
- Production output: 1,200,000 hl
- Parent: Sapporo Brewery (2006–present)
- Subsidiaries: The Beer Store (4.2%)
- Website: www.sleeman.ca

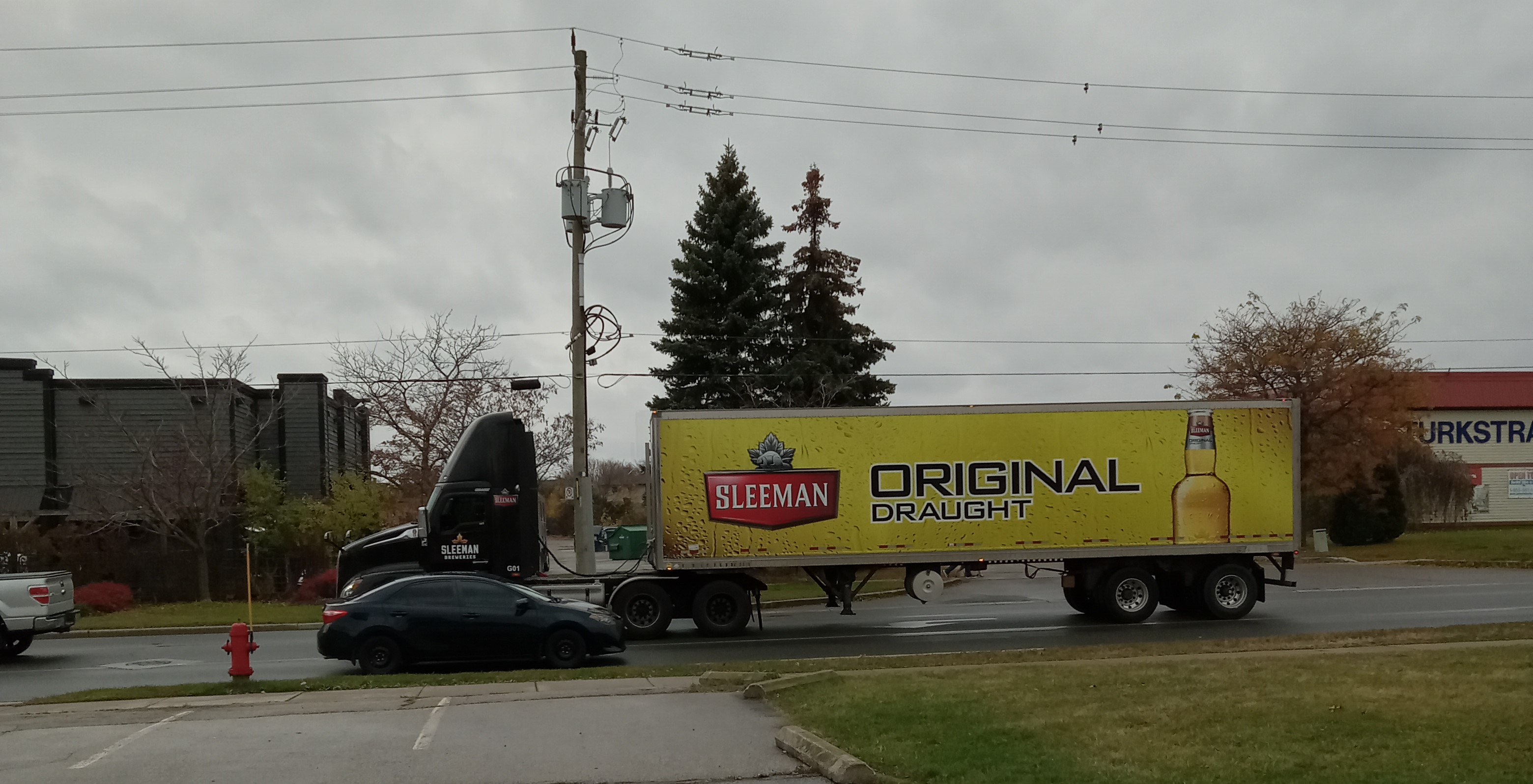
Sleeman delivery truck in Waterdown

Sleeman Breweries is a Japanese-owned Canadian brewery founded by John Warren Sleeman in 1988 in Guelph, Ontario. The company is the third-largest brewing company in Canada. Along with its own Sleeman brands, the company produces under licence the Stroh's family of brands, Maclays Ale and Sapporo Premium beers for sale in Canada. The company's parent Sapporo owns 4.2 per cent of Ontario's primary beer retailer The Beer Store.

The company is the re-establishment of a line of brewing companies owned by the Sleeman family dating back to the 1830s. The original Sleeman Breweries was established in the 1850s and operated until it lost its licence due to smuggling and tax evasion, for 50 years, in 1933.

John W. Sleeman re-established the brewery in the 1980s using the original company recipes. In 2006, Sleeman Breweries was purchased by Sapporo Brewery for CA$400 million. John W. Sleeman remained as CEO until 2010 when he relinquished that role and was made Chairman of the company.

== History ==
John H. Sleeman was born in Cornwall, England, in 1805 and came to Upper Canada (present day Ontario) in 1834, first settling in St. David's (Niagara-on-the-Lake) where he founded the Stamford Spring Brewery in 1836. He and his family moved to Guelph in 1847 where they operated a series of breweries including the Hodgert's Brewery, and the Silver Creek Brewery, which he opened in 1851. His son George Sleeman joined the company in 1859 as general manager and was named a partner in 1865. John H. died in 1893.

By 1890, George Sleeman had achieved great success with Silver Creek Brewery which had sales in Ontario and Quebec. He incorporated it into the Sleeman Brewing and Malting Company Limited with members of his immediate family. Due to excessive investments in his Guelph Street Railway Company, he lost the businesses to the banks in 1905; he then opened the Springbank Brewery. A year later the banks sold the brewery back to Sleeman. The family subsequently operated breweries in Guelph, often with success, until 1933. (Note: They were involved in smuggling during the American prohibition as well as the Canadian prohibition, said Sleeman.)

Prohibition in Canada had an effect on the business. In Ontario, prohibition started in 1916 with the passing of the Ontario Temperance Act by the Legislative Assembly of Ontario. While that eliminated the domestic market, the law allowed for brewing for export, so the Sleemans continued to do so, shipping their products to the US. This was perfectly legal until 1920 when the Volstead Act led to Prohibition in the United States as well. The Sleeman family (including younger members) subsequently worked with bootleggers to export their beer to Michigan, paying no taxes on the illegally gained profits. Some sources (including John W. Sleeman) hint that the family was involved with Al Capone but after considerable research, historian Micheal Matchett suggests that the contact in the US was actually Rocco Perri, often called the "Al Capone of Canada" according to the book Rocco Perri: The Story of Canada's Most Notorious Bootlegger. Perri had documented connections with Guelph's large Italian population.

In April 1927, the family claimed to a Parliament of Canada special committee that the business' books had been lost. Eventually, the smuggling was uncovered; it was allowed to continue however, on the agreement that taxes would be paid. Since the business refused to pay, charges were laid for smuggling and for non-payment of taxes later in 1933. On conviction, the family's license to brew beer was revoked for 50 years, effectively ending their entire enterprise. The brewing operation was sold to the Jockey Club Brewery Ltd.

=== Revival ===
Five decades later, in 1984, John W. Sleeman CM of Oakville, Ontario, great-great-grandson of John H. Sleeman, acquired the book of family beer recipes from his aunt Florian. He incorporated the new Sleeman Brewing and Malting Co. Ltd. in Guelph and began producing beer in 1988 with backing from Stroh Brewery Company for much of the $3 million he needed, a loan from a Detroit bank, and about $500,000 of his own money. The company flourished.

The Sapporo logo

In 2006, Sleeman Breweries was purchased by Sapporo Breweries for $400 million; in the agreement, John W. Sleeman sold all of his shares to Sapporo but continued as president until 2010. In 2012, the company produced 1,157,420 hL (30,576,000 US gal) of beverages, an increase of approximately 40,000 hL (1,100,000 US gal) over the previous year.

As of 2020, the company's President and CEO was Jesse Hanazawa. The company was brewing its products in three cities: Guelph, Ontario; Chambly, Quebec; and Vernon, British Columbia. These facilities were manufacturing Sleeman, Okanagan Spring and Unibroue Canadian beers as well as the Sapporo, Old Milwaukee and Pabst Blue Ribbon brands. The company previously operated a plant in Dartmouth, Nova Scotia, until its closure in 2013.

== Acquisitions ==
Over the years, Sleeman either acquired other breweries or purchased the rights to distribute, or manufacture and distribute, various brands of beer. (Note: "Sleeman purchased the Stroh Brewing Co. portfolio of discount beers in 1999 for $39-million. With brands including Old Milwaukee, Pabst Blue Ribbon, the deal helped Sleeman double the company's volumes but in a category with lower margins than premium beer.) (Note: Sleeman Brewing and Malting is incorporated and a second brewery, Spring Bank Beverages, is erected on Edinburgh Street.)

- In 1996, the Sleeman brewery purchased the Okanagan Spring Brewery and the consortium formed the new Sleeman Breweries Ltd.
- In 1998, the company acquired Upper Canada Brewing and Quebec's Brasserie Seigneuriale Inc.
- In 1999, Sleeman purchased Shaftebury Brewing Company, a large microbrewery in Delta, B.C.
- Also in 1999, Sleeman purchased the Canadian rights to brew and distribute the American Stroh Brewing Company's folio of brands, including Stroh's, Pabst Blue Ribbon, Old Milwaukee, Rainier and others for $39 million. (Note: "Buying the Stroh business doubled our volumes, made our plants more efficient and helped reduce our cost of goods sold. It was a great strategic decision." John W. Sleeman said.) (Note: "Sleeman purchased the Stroh Brewing Co. portfolio of discount beers)
- In 2000, Sleeman bought Maritime Beer Co., a small bankrupt brewer in Dartmouth, N.S.
- In 2002, the company purchased the rights to distribute products of the Dutch Grolsch Brewery in Canada.
- In 2004, the company bought Unibroue, Quebec's largest craft brewer that was making a line of premium beers in Chambly, Quebec.
- In 2019, the company bought Wild Rose Brewery, a small craft brewery in Calgary, Alberta.

== Timeline ==
Sleeman's breweries date back to 1836 when John H., a malter and brewer, founded Stamford Springs Brewery.

- 1800s – The Slyman family, unlicensed English brewers, change their name to Sleeman.
- 1805 – John Sleeman is born in Cornwall, England.
- 1834 – John H. Sleeman leaves Cornwall and arrives in Upper Canada (Ontario); he settles in St. Davids (Niagara-on-the-Lake).
- 1836 – Sleeman establishes the Stamford Springs Brewery in St. David's.
- 1845 – Sleeman moves to Lockport, New York, to craft brew beer.
- 1847 – He sells the Stamford Spring Brewery and moves from Rockport, New York, to Guelph, where he leases Hodgert's Brewery, which he will operate for three years.
- 1850 – Hodgerts Brewery is sold.
- 1851 – Sleeman establishes his third brewery, Silver Creek Brewery, in Guelph.
- 1859 – He relinquishes control to his son George Sleeman (1841–1923) who had been general manager and then partner.
- 1862 – The business is renamed Sleeman and Son when George Jr. joins the enterprise.
- 1867 – John H. Sleeman retires leaving George Sleeman (Sr.) as sole owner.
- 1900 – John's grandson George Sleeman Jr. incorporates Sleeman Brewing and Malting and in 1903, he opens a second company, Spring Bank Beverages.
- 1921 – Silver Springs Brewery Beverage Company is renamed Canada Malt Products.
- 1927 – Spring Bank Brewery is incorporated and managed by Henry O. Sleeman.
- 1933 – The Sleeman brothers are charged with smuggling and tax evasion; their license is suspended and the brewery is sold to the Jockey Club.
- 1955 – The Sleeman Brewing and Malting Company name becomes inactive.
- 1988 – The Sleeman Brewing and Malting Company is re-established by John Warren Sleeman, great-great grandson of John H. Sleeman, marketing beer in clear bottles instead of the typical brown.
- 1999 – Sleeman Brewing purchases Shaftebury Brewing Company.
- 2004 – Sleeman Breweries Ltd. buys Quebec based Unibroue brewery for $36.5 million.
- 2006 – Sapporo Breweries purchases Sleeman for approximately $400 million.
- 2014 – Shaftebury Brewing Company is sold to Fireweed Brewing Company

== Operations ==
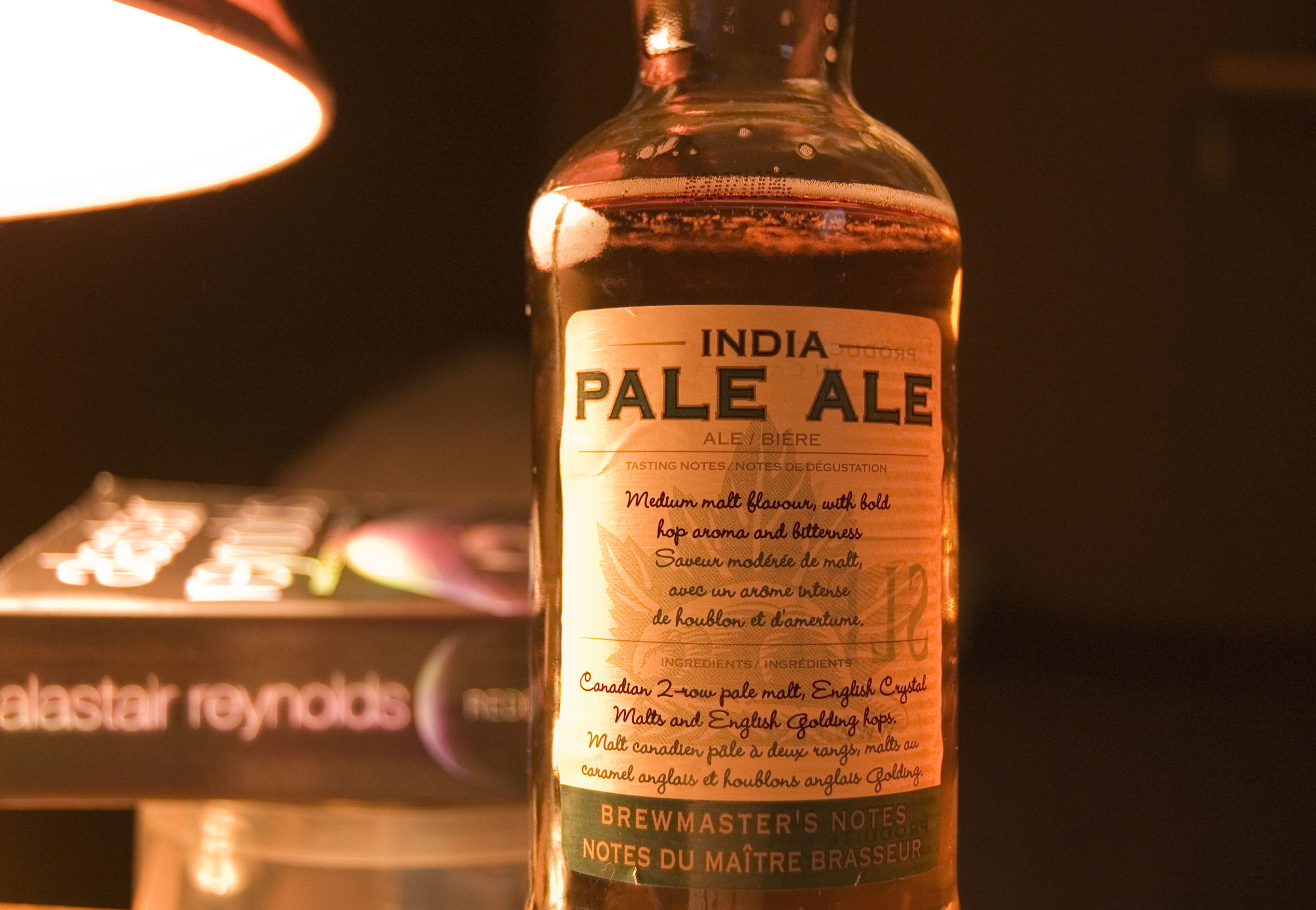
A bottle of John Sleeman Presents India Pale Ale

The brewery produces a line of beers under the Sleeman name, including:

- Clear 2.0 (a low carbohydrate beer)
- Cream Ale
- Original Lager
- Honey Brown Lager
- Silver Creek Lager
- Light
- Rousse Dark
- India Pale Ale
- Fine Porter

Aside from its own brands, the company brews Pabst products for the Canadian market, including Old Milwaukee, Stroh's, Schlitz and Pabst Blue Ribbon. Other brands brewed under licence include Maclays Pale Ale for Maclays Brewery, Red Bull Beer and Sapporo Premium for Sapporo Brewery, their parent company.

Sleeman also continues to brew Upper Canada Lager and Upper Canada Dark Ale, two beers that were formerly produced by the Upper Canada Brewing Company before it acquired the company. Additional beers under the Upper Canada brand including Rebellion Lager, Wheat and Maple Brown Ale have since been discontinued.

Sleeman owns a 2% stake in The Beer Store (previously Brewers Retail), the operator of the primary retail outlet for beer in Ontario.

Many Sleeman brands are distributed in clear bottles, which are less expensive, but can result in the liquids becoming more susceptible to light damage. Concerned this would affect the beer's taste, Sleeman compensates for this in a majority of their brews by using hops that are processed to be less light sensitive.

The annual Canadian Brewing Awards recognizes the best beers in Canada using blind taste tests. Most of the 2015 winners were craft beers. However, one of the winners was Sleeman Cream Ale, taking a Gold in the Cream Ale category.

== Marketing ==
The brewery entered into a $1.2 million sponsorship deal with the City of Guelph in 2007 that gives Sleeman exclusive naming rights to the Guelph Sports and Entertainment Centre until 2020.

In 2010, the company began an advertising campaign drawing attention to their bootlegging past. In July 2016, an ad with the slogan "Every bottle of Sleeman has a past – A shady past" won Best Alcohol Ad of the Month from AdForum, an online showcase for advertising agencies.

== See also ==
- Beer in Canada
- List of breweries in Canada
