= Shaftebury Brewing Company =

Canadian brewery

- Industry: Brewery
- Founded: 1986; 40 years ago in Vancouver, British Columbia, Canada
- Founders: Tim Wittig; Paul Beaton
- Parent: Sleeman Breweries (1999-2014); Fireweed Brewing Company (from 2014)
- Website: www.shafteburybeer.ca

The Shaftebury Brewing Company is a craft brewery started in Vancouver, British Columbia in 1986. Shaftebury was sold to Sleeman Breweries in 1999. In 2014, the brand was sold to Fireweed Brewing Company, Tree Brewing.

Beers produced include Four Twenty Brilliant Lager, Coastal Cream Ale, Wet Coast Wheat Ale, Easy Honey Pale Ale, Summer Days Premium Pilsner, and Winter Nights Black & Tan.

== History ==
Shaftebury was started in 1986 by Tim Wittig and Paul Beaton in Vancouver. Sales were originally limited to draft in the Vancouver area, where they became popular among fans of British-style ales. Shaftebury taps feature a porcelain brewer with apron.

By late 1995, Shaftebury moved to Delta. With the purchase of the company by Sleeman Breweries in early 1999, the Delta plant shut down and production moved to the Okanagan Spring brewery in Vernon.

In February 2014, the Shaftebury brands were purchased by Fireweed Brewing and production was moved to their Kelowna brewery, where the Shaftebury Delta brewhouse is still used since they purchased it from Sleemans in 1999.

== Cream ale ==
The West Coast interpretation of the cream ale can be traced back to one brand: Shaftebury Cream Ale.

When Wittig and Beaton started Shaftebury they hired John Mitchell as the brewer. They were drawn to one of Mitchell's beers, an English mild called Mount Tolmie dark. Wittig and Beaton decided to model the Shaftebury beer recipe after this beer. Wittig explained that the original Shaftebury Cream Ale was dark brown: "At the time when we made it, it had a completely different flavour. It was 4.8 alcohol by volume and it got its dark colour from the chocolate and crystal malt that we imported from England."

The term "cream ale" was borrowed from Genesee Cream Ale, brewed by North American Breweries. "We didn’t even know a lot about beer, honestly." Wittg said. "It was just strictly a name that we had had exposure to and we thought sounded cool. It did just come straight out of the blue. It was not based on a style at all which probably drives people crazy." The Shaftebury version sold very well in Vancouver.

== Brands ==
- Coastal Cream Ale – The original cream ale produced in BC and the signature beer produced by Shaftebury since 1988.
- Four Twenty Brilliant Lager – Light bodied lager
- Easy Honey Pale Ale – A light ale
- Wetcoast Winter Ale (Seasonal) – A seasonal ale, supplemented with blackstrap molasses and golden syrup

== Awards ==
World Beer Cup – 2004 English-style Mild ale – Silver – Shaftebury Coastal Cream Ale

World Beer Cup – 2006 English-style Mild Ale – Gold – Shaftebury Coastal Cream Ale
