= Maclays Brewery =

Brewery originally based in Alloa, Clackmannanshire, Scotland

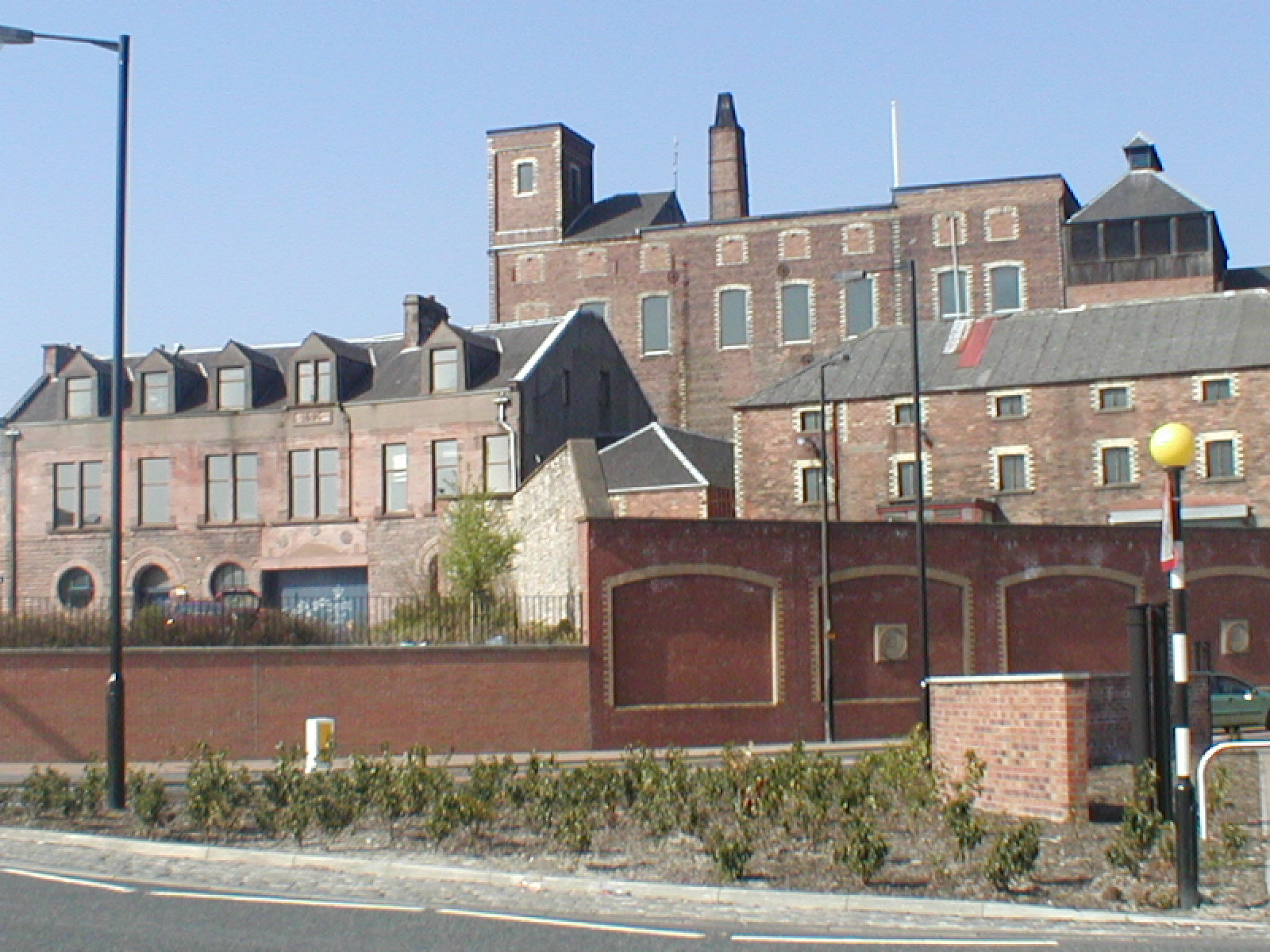
Maclay's Thistle Brewery in 2003

Maclay's Brewery was a Scottish brewery based in Alloa, Clackmannanshire until 2001. It remains a beer brand in Scotland and Canada, produced under contract at other breweries in each country.

== History ==
In 1830, James Maclay (1801-1875) founded the brewery as James Maclay, Ale, Porter, Table and India Beer Brewer of Alloa. James Maclay established himself as a brewer of great repute over the next 39 years and in 1870, James built the Thistle Brewery, which until 1999, was the home of the ales, which bore his name.

James Maclay died in 1875, leaving his two sons James and John to run the company. The Fraser family, licensed grocers and spirit merchants from Dunfermline took over Maclay in December 1896 and in December of that year, the firm became a private limited company named Maclay & Company, Limited.

Maclays ales won medals at Vienna in 1894, Newcastle in 1898 and Paris in 1900.

Despite the renown of their Oat Malt Stout, the change in fashion away from dark beers led to difficulties for the company in the 1990s and brewing at the Thistle Brewery ceased in 1999. In 2001 the company ceased using the buildings as their office base. The Thistle brewery has since been demolished and replaced by retail units and flats. Only part of the brewery survives and is now a pub called The Old Brewery, owned by Belhaven.

On 10 March 1994 the company changed its name to Maclay Inns Limited to better reflect its current business model. The company acquired the Clockwork Beer Company in Glasgow, which now operates as the de facto Maclays brewery under the Three Thistles PLC, brewing its own range of beers and Maclays recipes.

In 2012 Tennent Caledonian acquired a substantial minority shareholding.

On 23 January 2015 it was announced that the company had gone into administration after failing to find a “strategic solution to the financial pressures facing the business”. Administrators EY continue to operate the business whilst trying to find a buyer. The 15 pubs are reported to be trading profitably. In June 2015 it was reported that Stonegate Pub Company had bought the Maclays owned pubs from administration.

== Beers ==
Maclays beers are now brewed under licence by Belhaven Brewery and by Sleeman Breweries in Canada.
