= George Sleeman =

Canadian brewer, politician, and baseball pioneer

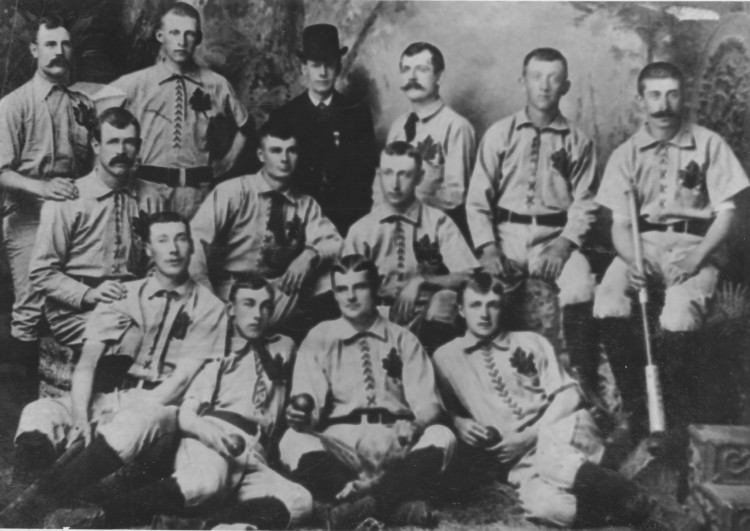
- Guelph Maple Leafs team c. 1900; Sleeman is in the back row with hat
- Born: August 1, 1841; St. David's, Canada West
- Died: December 16, 1926 (aged 85); Guelph, Ontario, Canada
- Occupation: Brewer
- Employer: Silver Creek Brewery
- Known for: Guelph Maple Leafs
- Baseball career

Member of the Canadian

Baseball Hall of Fame
- Induction: 1999

George Sleeman (August 1, 1841 – December 16, 1926) was a brewer, a major figure in Canadian baseball, and a politician in Ontario, Canada. He was mayor of Guelph from 1880 to 1882 and from 1905 to 1906. Sleeman was also the president of the Guelph Rifle Association for 20 years, president of the Guelph Turf Club, president of the Guelph Bicycle Club, and, for four years, president of the Ontario Brewing and Malting Association. He helped establish the Royal City Curling Club. His brewery also sponsored an amateur baseball team called the Silver Creek Club.

== Early years ==
The son of John H. Sleeman, an immigrant from England, and Ann M. Burrows, George Sleeman was born in then-Upper Canada in the village of St. David's (present day Niagara-on-the-Lake) and was educated there and in Guelph. The family moved to Guelph in 1857 and in 1859, he became general manager of his father's Silver Creek Brewery; six years later he became a partner. Sleeman fully took over the operation in 1867 when his father retired. In 1900, he incorporated his breweries as the Sleeman Brewing and Malting Company. The family played an important role in the establishment of beer in Canada.

In 1863, Sleeman married Sarah Hill. The family lived in Guelph, later in a gothic custom-built mansion that was completed in 1891 at an estimated $30,000, near what is now called Silver Creek Parkway. In 1876, he was elected to Guelph town council for the first time. In 1877 he was elected Deputy Reeve and in 1880, after Guelph was transformed from a town into a city, he became the first mayor. He was elected mayor three subsequent times.

== Prominent brewer ==
By 1890, his Silver Creek Brewery had 15 retail stores in two provinces (Ontario and Quebec). In 1894, Sleeman set up the Guelph Street Railway Company, an electric streetcar company. He invested so much of his own money in the operation that by 1902 the banks took over his house, railway and his brewery. (Sleeman's original railway was the foundation of the subsequent Radial Railway Company that expanded to serve more distant communities.) Sleeman set up a rival brewery in 1903, Springbank, and the banks sold him back the original brewery a year later.

Sleeman retired from the family business in 1905 and died in Guelph in 1926 at the age of 85 after undergoing an operation for an obstructed bowel.

After being taken over by the Jockey Club Brewery in 1933, the Sleeman brand was discontinued and the brewery ceased production six years later. In 1985, Sleeman's great-grandson John Warren Sleeman reincorporated the Sleeman Breweries and began producing beers, and Sleeman's Cream Ale, using the original recipes provided to him by an aunt.

== Achievements in Canadian baseball ==
Sleeman had been a pitcher for the Guelph Maple Leafs baseball club and later became the team's financial backer. He was the first team manager to import American players; at first, he paid them a share of the profits, but later he paid his players salaries. He encouraged other teams to do so in the new Canadian Association of Base Ball Players, of which he was president. In 1869, the Leafs squad won the Canadian championship and Sleeman was named president of the club. The Leafs also won the Canadian championship in 1870 and 1871. In 1877, Sleeman helped establish the International Association as a competitor to the National League.

Later, when Toronto and Hamilton entered teams, Sleeman's Guelph Maple Leafs started losing money and eventually the team was disbanded, but returned in 1896. George Sleeman was inducted into the Canadian Baseball Hall of Fame in 1999.
