= U.S. Open Beer Championship =

The U.S. Open Beer Championship is an international brewing competition. The event, which is open to professional breweries and award-winning home brewers, is held in late June, with the winners announced in July.

Over 140 styles of beer are judged. Winners receive a medal in the shape of a beer stein for 1st, 2nd, or 3rd place. Beers placing in the top 10 of each category and in the top 10 breweries overall are featured on BeerInfo.com. A Grand National Champion is awarded based on a point system for beers (5 minimum) entered in the competition.

Started in 2009 (16 years ago), the U.S. Open was created by former Friends Brewing owner and brewmaster, Dow Scoggins. This was the first beer judging to be started by former and current brewers and is the only professional competition to allow homebrewers. Every year, the gold medal winners of the National Homebrewers Competition get invited to compete against the pros.

Grand national champions:

- 2009 - Deschutes Brewing – Bend, Oregon
- 2010 - Maui Brewing - Hawaii
- 2011 - Deschutes Brewing – Bend, Oregon
- 2012 - Sweetwater Brewing - Atlanta, Georgia
- 2013 - Capital Brewery - Middleton, Wisconsin
- 2014 - Wormtown Brewery - Worcester, Massachusetts
- 2015 - Ballast Point Brewing - San Diego, California
- 2016 - Firestone Walker Brewing - Paso Robles, California
- 2017 - Cherry Street Brewing - Cumming, Georgia
- 2018 - Peticolas Brewing Company - Dallas, Texas
- 2019 - Sun King Brewery - Indianapolis, Indiana
- 2020 – Deschutes Brewery – Bend, Oregon
- 2021 - Toppling Goliath Brewing - Decorah, Iowa
- 2022 - Sun King Brewery - Indianapolis, Indiana
