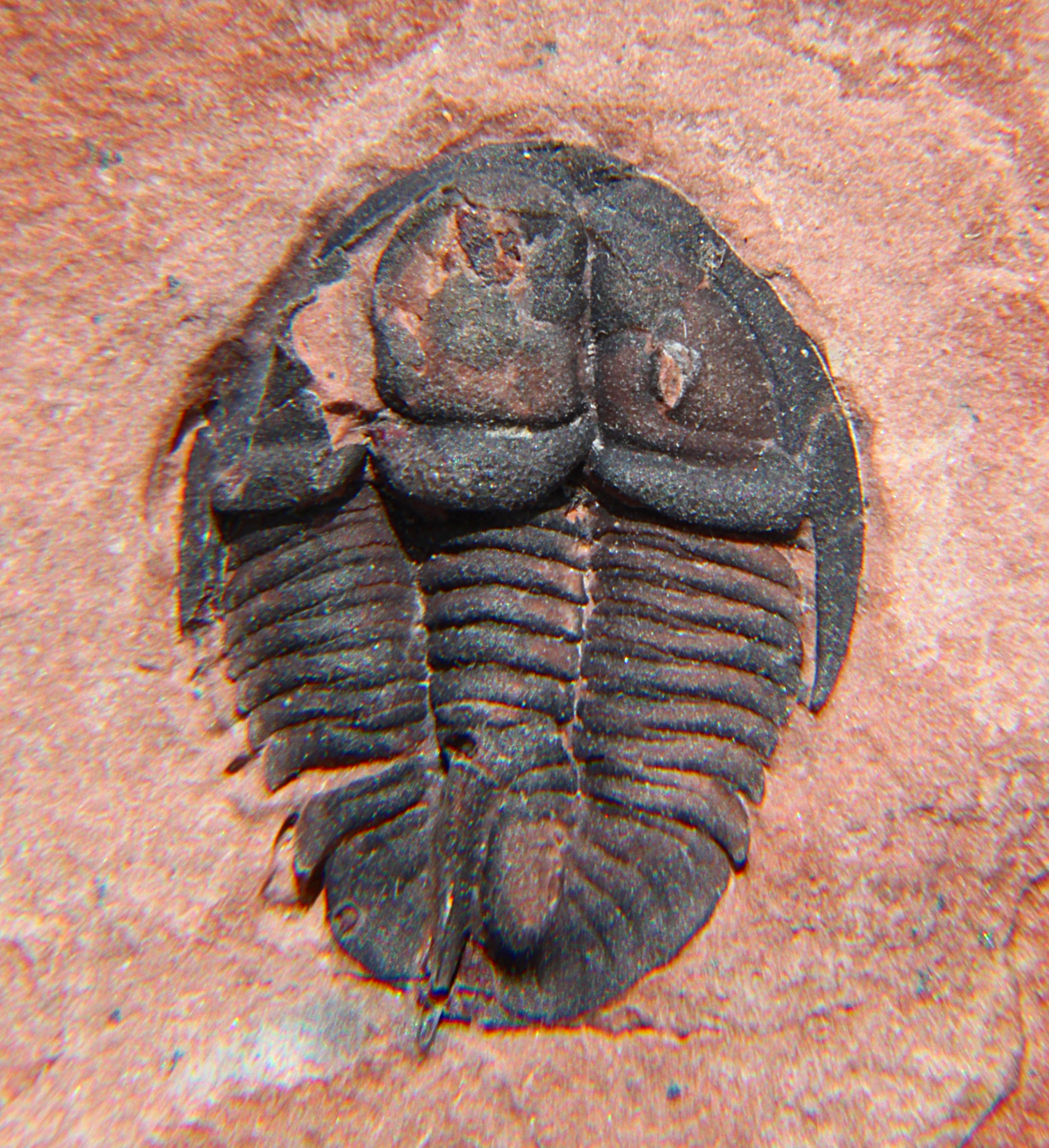
- Genevievella granulosa, 18mm

Scientific classification
- Kingdom: Animalia
- Phylum: Arthropoda
- Clade: †Artiopoda
- Class: †Trilobita
- Order: †Ptychopariida
- Family: †Llanoaspididae
- Genus: †Genevievella; Lochman, 1936

Type species
- Genevievella neunia Lochman, 1936

Synonyms
- Placosema Opik 1967

= Genevievella =

Genevievella Temporal range: Upper Cambrian

Extinct genus of trilobites

Genevievella is a genus of trilobites with a short inverted egg-shaped outline, a wide headshield, small eyes, and long genal spines. The backrim of the headshield is inflated and overhangs the first of the 9 thorax segments. The 8th thorax segment from the front bears a backward directed spine that reaches beyond the back end of the exoskeleton. It has an almost oval tailshield with 5 pairs of pleural furrows. It lived during the Upper Cambrian in what are today Canada and the United States.

== Distribution ==
- Genevievella caelata is known from the Upper Cambrian of Australia (Mindyallan, Upper beds Member, Mungerbar Formation, Glenormiston, Queensland, 22.9° S, 138.8° E).
- Genevievella simon, G. cuniculaena, G. raggedi and G. campbellina have been found in the Upper Cambrian of Canada (Dresbachian, Rabbitkettle Formation, Yukon, 62.7° N, 128.4° W).
- Genevievella campbellina occurs in the Upper Cambrian of the United States (Merioneth: Warriorsmark, Huntingdon, Huntingdon; Warrior Formation, near Waddle, Centre County, all Pennsylvania, 40.8° N, 77.9° W)
- Genevievella spinox has been excavated from the Upper Cambrian of the United States (Dresbachian, Coosella zone, Riley Formation, Central Texas, 30.3° N, 97.7° W)
- G. bigranulosa is present in the Upper Cambrian of China (Guzhangian, Glyptagnostus stolidotus trilobite zone and Paibian, Glyptagnostus reticulatus trilobite zone, both Huaqiao Formation, Hunan, 28.4° N, 109.5° E).
