= Coosella helena =

Coosella helena Temporal range: Middle Cambrian–Late Cambrian

Scientific classification
- Kingdom: Animalia
- Phylum: Arthropoda
- Clade: †Artiopoda
- Class: †Trilobita
- Order: †Ptychopariida
- Family: †Crepicephalidae
- Genus: †Coosella
- Species: †C. helena

Binomial name
- †Coosella helena Lochman, 1938

Extinct marine species of trilobite

Coosella helena is an extinct marine species of trilobite from the middle to upper Cambrian period. Fossils of this species can be found in North America, specifically, Canada. This specific species of trilobite was discovered by Christina Lochman-Balk on the St. George Peninsula of Newfoundland in 1938.

The Peabody Museum of Natural History holds both the holotype as well as 16 paratype specimens.

Fossil samples can be found in the fossil collection of Mount Holyoke College in South Hadley, Massachusetts, where Lochman-Balk used to teach as an associate professor (1935–1947).
