= Ellisell =

Ellisell Temporal range: Middle Cambrian

Scientific classification
- Kingdom: Animalia
- Phylum: †Agmata
- Family: †Salterellidae
- Genus: †Ellisell; Peel & Berg-Madsen, 1988
- Species: †E. yochelsoni

Binomial name
- †Ellisell yochelsoni Peel & Berg-Madsen, 1988

Extinct genus of Cambrian organisms

Ellisell is a Middle Cambrian genus of fossils from Denmark. It contains only one species, Ellisell yochelsoni. Both the genus and species are named after the paleontologist and geologist Ellis L. Yochelson (1928–2006), who had turned 60 at the time the fossils were first described. The genus was originally placed in the family Salterellidae of the phylum Agmata; this placement was rejected by Yochelson & Kisselev (2003), but was restored by Peel (2016). Ellisell is distinguished from Salterella by its slowly expanding conch and the resulting cylindrical apertural cavity, compared to the latter's more rapidly expanding conch and cone-shaped apertural cavity.
