= Gog Group =

Stratigraphic unit in the Western Canada Sedimentary Basin

- Stratigraphic range: Early Cambrian)
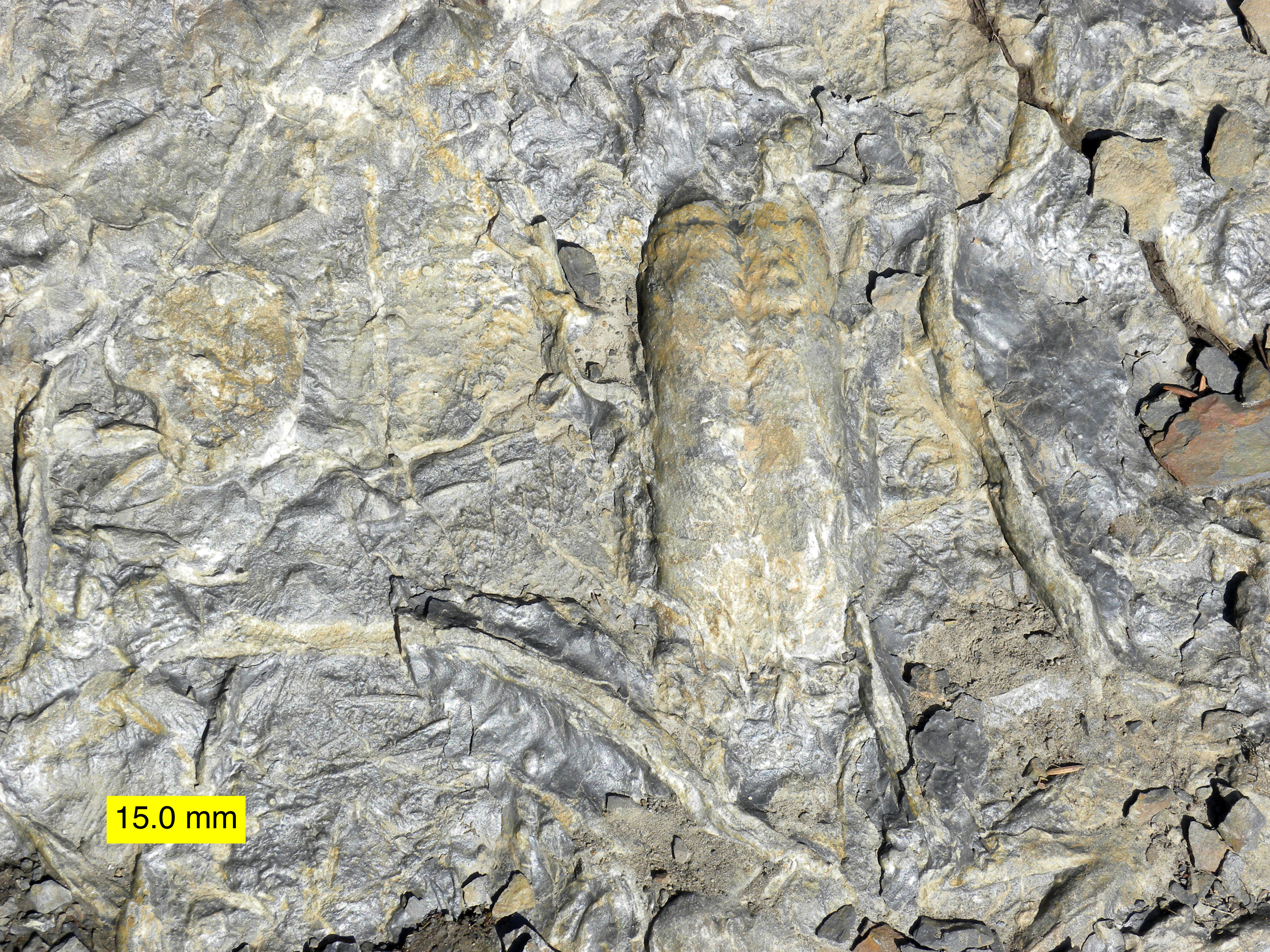
- Trace fossils in a slab from the Gog Group
- Type: Group
- Sub-units: see text
- Underlies: Mount Whyte Formation, Chancellor Group, Snake Indian Formation
- Overlies: Miette Group
- Thickness: up to 2,180 metres (7,150 ft)

Lithology
- Primary: Quartzose sandstone, quartzite, conglomerate
- Other: Siltstone, mudstone, limestone, dolomite

Location
- Region: Alberta British Columbia
- Country: Canada

Type section
- Named by: C.F. Deiss, 1940

The Gog Group is a stratigraphic unit in the Western Canada Sedimentary Basin. It is present in the eastern and western main ranges of the Canadian Rockies in Alberta and British Columbia. It was named by C.F. Deiss in 1940 after Gog Lake near its type locality at Wonder Pass near Mount Assiniboine.

== Lithology and environment of deposition ==
The Gog Group consists primarily of thick deposits of cross-bedded quartzose sandstone and quartzite, with minor quartzitic conglomerate and sub-arkosic sandstone. It also includes mudstone, siltstone, limestone and dolomite formations. The Gog sediments are thought to have been deposited in shallow marine environments on the subsiding margin of the North American craton (Laurentia).

== Stratigraphy ==
=== Subdivisions ===
The Gog Group is subdivided into the following formations:

==== Jasper area (north) ====
Formation	Age	Lithology	Max. thickness	Reference
Hota Formation	late Early Cambrian	arenaceous limestone	244 m (800 ft)	
Mahato Formation	Early Cambrian	quartzose sandstone	240 m (790 ft)	
Mural Formation	Early Cambrian	limestone, dolomite, shale, quartzose sandstone	545 m (1,790 ft)	
McNaughton Formation	Early Cambrian	quartzose sandstone, quartzite, arkosic sandstone, conglomerate	600 m (1,970 ft)	
Jasper Formation	Early Cambrian	arkosic sandstone, quartzite, conglomerate, argillite	500 m (1,640 ft)	

==== Kicking Horse Pass area (south) ====
Formation	Age	Lithology	Max. thickness	Reference
Peyto Formation	late Early Cambrian	limestone, dolomite	125 m (410 ft)	
St. Piran Formation	Early Cambrian	quartzose sandstone	825 m (2,710 ft)	
Lake Louise Formation	Early Cambrian	limestone, dolomite, shale, quartzose sandstone		
Fort Mountain Formation	Early Cambrian	quartzose sandstone, quartzite, arkosic sandstone, conglomerate	510 m (1,670 ft)	
Jasper Formation	Early Cambrian	arkosic sandstone, quartzite, conglomerate, argillite	500 m (1,640 ft)	

== Paleontology ==
Trace fossils such as Skolithos, Cruziana, Diplocraterion, Chondrites, Planolites, Rusophycus and others are abundant in the Gog Group sediments, and Early Cambrian trilobites of the genus Olenellus are found in the Peyto Formation limestones at the top of the Group. Small archaeocyathid bioherms have been reported from the base of the Mahato Formation, and archaeocyathids, salterellids, primitive brachiopods and echinoderms have been reported from the Mural Formation.

== See also ==
- List of fossiliferous stratigraphic units in Alberta
- Big Rock (glacial erratic)
- Foothills Erratics Train
