= Big Rock Brewery =

Brewery based in Calgary, Alberta, Canada

Coordinates: 50.9847°N 113.9544°W

Big Rock Brewery Inc.
- Traded as: TSX: BR
- Industry: Alcoholic drink
- Founded: 1985
- Founder: Ed McNally
- Headquarters: Calgary, Alberta, Canada
- Key people: David Kinder (Chief Executive Officer)
- Products: Beer
- Production output: ▲181,951 hL (2015); 168,268 hL (2014)
- Revenue: ▲ C$39,594,000 (2015); C$36,755,000 (2014)
- Operating income: ▼ -C$1,146,000 (2015); C$715,000 (2014)
- Net income: ▼ -C$1,075,000 (2015); C$624,000 (2014)
- Owner: Public
- Website: bigrockbeer.com

Big Rock Brewery is a Canadian public company and the largest brewery that is based in Calgary, Alberta, Canada. As of March 2020, it was also Canada's largest craft brewery. Big Rock distributes a variety of beers and ciders throughout Canada.

== History ==
The brewery was founded in 1984, by Ed McNally, who was disappointed in the beer available to buy in Calgary, AB. A lawyer by trade, McNally was representing a group of barley growers in a legal action against the Alberta Wheat Board in the 1980s. Through the course of the legal action, McNally learned that the Alberta climate produces 2-row barley that is ideally suited for malting, and had access to glacial water from the nearby Rocky Mountains. At the time, most barley production in Alberta was used as cattle feed. With an entrepreneurial background, McNally decided to open a craft brewery. The name "Big Rock" was chosen after the Okotoks Erratic, a 16,500-tonne glacial boulder located outside of the town of Okotoks.

The first brewmaster was Bernd Pieper, a German brewmaster for Heineken International. In Summer 1986, when Big Rock had been in production for only a year, workers at the Molson and Labatt breweries went on strike. This proved to be a windfall for Big Rock, as it was the only beer available in Alberta that summer, and production quickly grew.

The second brewmaster was Larry Kerwin, a former brewmaster for Molson and current distiller at Eau Claire Distillery. Kerwin started as a brewer at Big Rock under Pieper in 1994, and took over as brewmaster in 2003 when Pieper retired. He was with Big Rock for 12 years.

The third brewmaster was Paul Gautreau. Gautreau joined Big Rock in 1986 as its fourth employee and worked in marketing and operational capacities before replacing Kerwin as brewmaster. Gautreau is a graduate of the Brewing and Packaging program at the University of California, Davis, the Brewing & Malting Science program at the University of Wisconsin–Madison, and the Institute of Brewing and Distilling in London, England. He is also a member of the American Society of Brewing Chemists, the Institute of Brewing and Distilling, and he has served as president of the Master Brewers Association of the Americas.

The fourth brewmaster was Ignacio Rodriguez, who held the role from 2022 to 2025. He had previously worked for Molson Coors, Bridge Brewing Company, and Craft Collective Beerworks.

McNally retired from day-to-day operation of the company, retaining the ceremonial title "Chairman Emeritus" until his death in August 2014.

In March 2015, Big Rock's Urban Brewery opened in Vancouver, British Columbia. In 2017, Big Rock partnered with restaurateurs Oliver & Bonacini to open Liberty Commons at Big Rock Brewery, located in Liberty Village, Toronto. These locations later closed in 2024 and 2025, respectively, as Big Rock focused on their Calgary location.

On July 23, 2018, Big Rock closed an amended transaction to acquire certain brewing assets and inventory related to branded beer and cider from the Fireweed Brewing Corporation, including beverage brands such as Tree Brewing, Dukes Cider, and Shaftebury.

== Products ==
Big Rock brews 10 year-round beers, 5 ciders, as well as a number of seasonal offerings and limited edition lambic-style beers.

=== Year-round beers ===
- Traditional Ale – A medium-bodied brown ale in the traditional English style
- Grasshopper – A medium-full bodied Kristall Weizen (filtered wheat ale). Winner of the 2007 and 2009 Gold Medal and the 2017 Silver Medal for "Wheat Beer – North American Style" at the Canadian Brewing Awards and named "Best Patio Beer" by the National Post in 2006.
- Czech Style Pilsner – A European-style lager. Winner of 5 awards including the 2017 Gold Medal for European Lager – Pilsner at the Canadian Brewing Awards, and the 2019 Gold Medal for German/Czech Style Pilsner at the Alberta Beer Awards.
- Rhine Stone Cowboy – A lagered ale
- Warthog – An English Style Mild Ale (discontinued)
- Honey Brown Lager – A medium-brown lager
- Session IPA – A bitter pale ale (discontinued)
- Citradelic – A single-hop American IPA
- Scottish Heavy Ale – A malt-flavoured ale
- Craft Lager – Canadian-style lager (discontinued)

=== Rock Creek ciders ===
- Rock Creek Apple Cider – A dry cider with Okanagan apples
- Rock Creek Peach Cider – A dry cider with peach
- Rock Creek Pear Cider – A dry cider with pear
- Rock Creek Strawberry Rhubarb Cider – A dry cider with strawberries and rhubarb (discontinued)
- Rock Creek Rosé Cider – A dry cider with apples and rosé wine flavours (discontinued)

=== Coolship program ===
Big Rock Brewery is the first commercial craft brewery in Canada to develop a wild ale, authentic Belgium style program. They built an isolated wing in their brewery that includes a custom-built 2,000-litre Coolship. It has been designed to replicate the open fermentation conditions of Belgian breweries that specialize in brewing traditional lambic sour beers.

- Kriek – 3,000 bottles released in February 2018. A lambic-style Kriek aged in wine barrels with cherries.
- Framboise – 1,500 bottles released in March 2019. A lambic-style Framboise aged in wine barrels with raspberries.

=== Seasonal brews ===
- Midnight Rhapsody Dark Ale – Fall 2018 release
- Jackrabbit – A light lager (discontinued)

=== Contract brews ===
Big Rock brews beers for restaurants in Western Canada, including:

- Hudsons Tap House Beers, which include Beaver Tail Amber Ale, and Lumberjack Premium Lager
- John Palliser Ale for the Fairmont Palliser Hotel in Calgary, Alberta
- Livingston Lager for Heritage Park in Calgary, Alberta
- President's Choice beers for Loblaw Companies Limited in their western Canadian markets
- Co-op branded beers for Calgary Co-operative Assn. Ltd at their liquor outlets.
- Original Joe's draft beers labels at their restaurants.

== Marketing ==
=== Big Rock Barn Burner concert series ===
In 2017, Big Rock Brewery hosted the Barn Burner Concert at their Calgary brewery. The concert was held in the brewery parking lot and included live music, craft beer, and local food. Headliners included The Sheepdogs, Sam Roberts Band, and The Dead South. In 2018, they expanded the concert series to Toronto playing host to indie-folk group Mt. Joy.

=== Big Rock Eddies ===
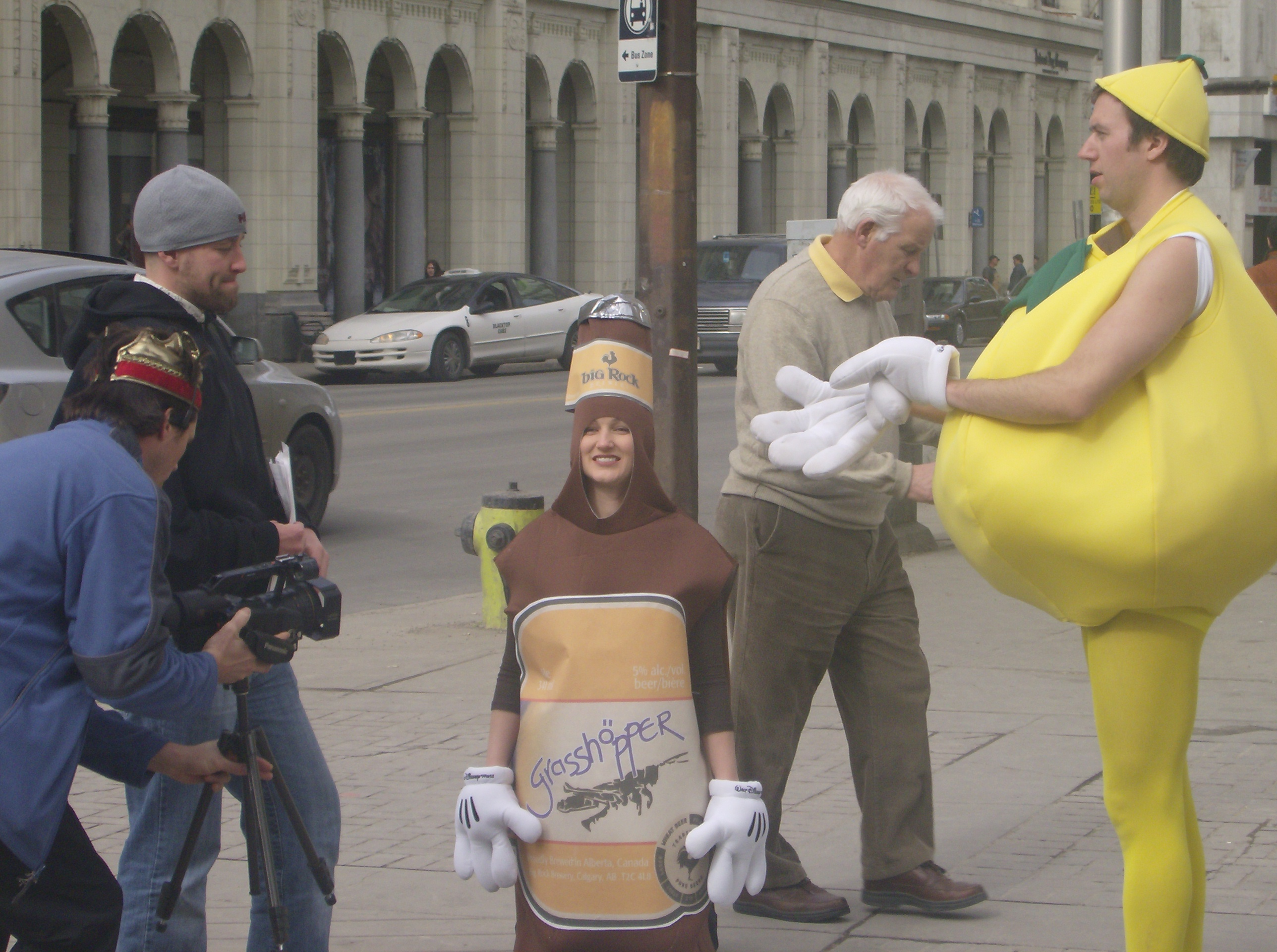
A Big Rock Eddies producer creates a submission on the streets of Calgary

From 1993 to 2016, the Big Rock Brewery Eddies were an annual event in Calgary that raised money for Calgary arts beneficiaries, including One Yellow Rabbit Performance Theatre, the Calgary Folk Music Festival, and the Epcor Centre for the Performing Arts (now Arts Commons). The Eddies were a promotional contest to encourage beer drinkers to make an advertisement for Big Rock. The contest later included a student category that allowed post-secondary students to compete with their peers for prize money.

== See also ==
- Canadian beer
