= Vologdinella =

Vologdinella Temporal range: Middle Cambrian

Scientific classification
- Kingdom: Animalia
- Phylum: incertae sedis
- Family: †Vologdinellidae; Balashov in Ruzhentsev, 1962
- Genus: †Vologdinella; Balashov in Ruzhentsev, 1962
- Species: †V. antiqua

Binomial name
- †Vologdinella antiqua (Vologdin, 1931)

Synonyms
- †Orthoceras? antiquus Vologdin, 1931

Extinct genus of shelled animals

Vologdinella is a poorly known genus of extinct animals of uncertain classification with small cylindrical shells. The animals are known from Middle Cambrian fossils from a Paleozoic limestone in the Chingiz Mountains of Kazakhstan. The genus was established by Russian paleontologist Zakhar Grigoryevich Balashov in 1962 for a single species, Vologdinella antiqua, which was originally described and illustrated as Orthoceras? antiquus by Aleksandr Grigoryevich Vologdin in 1931.

The genus was historically classified as a cephalopod, though it has since been removed from this group. Vologdinella bears superficial resemblance to the Early Cambrian Volborthella. In the same work establishing the former genus, the two genera were classified within their own families – Vologdinellidae and Volborthellidae, respectively – within the order Volborthellida. Volborthella was later included in Agmata, an extinct phylum proposed by the paleontologist and geologist Ellis L. Yochelson. Vologdinella was also considered for inclusion in the Agmata, or in questionable synonymy with Volborthella, but a later study determined that the genus was not related to them.

== See also ==
- Olenecoceras – another genus named by Balashov, also was formerly believed to be a cephalopod
