= Olenecoceras =

Olenecoceras Temporal range: Middle Cambrian

Scientific classification
- Kingdom: Animalia
- Phylum: incertae sedis
- Genus: †Olenecoceras; Balashov, 1966
- Species: †O. rastorguense

Binomial name
- †Olenecoceras rastorguense Balashov, 1966

Extinct genus of Cambrian animals

Olenecoceras is a genus of Middle Cambrian fossils that, once believed to be a cephalopod, has since been excluded from that group (although no alternative classification has been offered). The genus was established by Zakhar Grigor'evich Balashov in 1966, from the river Olenyok.

== See also ==
- Vologdinella – another genus named by Balashov, also was formerly believed to be a cephalopod
