= Okotoks Erratic =

Glacial erratic in Alberta, Canada

Okotoks Erratic Big Rock
- Glacial erratic
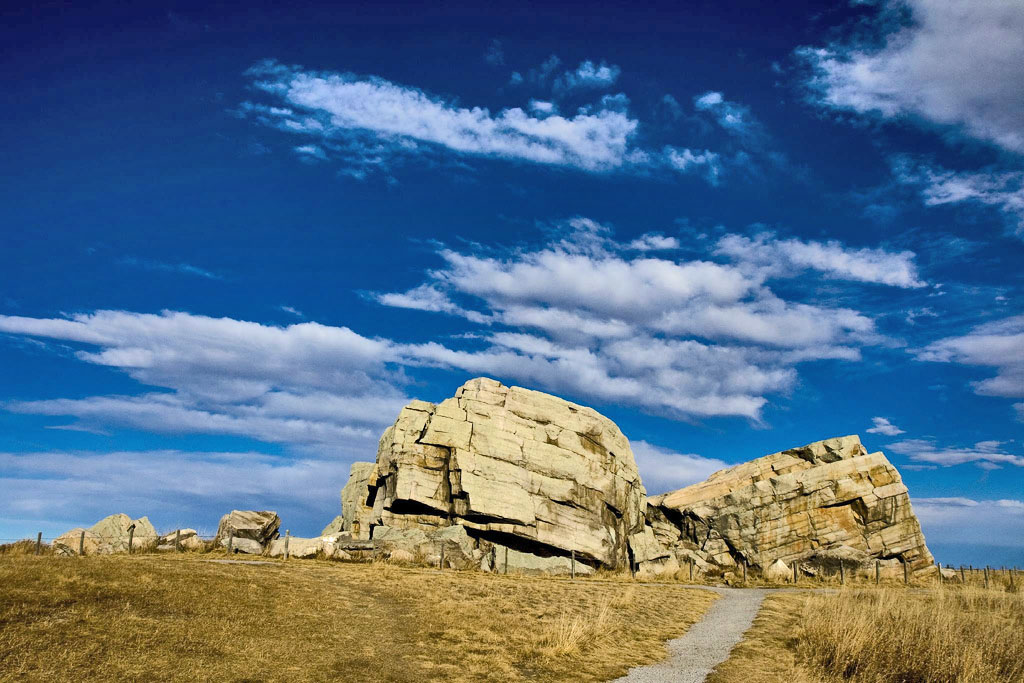

- Location within Canada
- Coordinates: 50°42′21.18″N 114°04′35.12″W
- Location: near Okotoks, Alberta
- Formed by: quartzite
- Geology: glacial erratic
- Topo map: NTS 82J9 Turner Valley

Okotoks Erratic (also known as either Big Rock or, in Blackfoot, as Okotok) is a 16,500-tonne (18,200-ton) boulder that lies on the otherwise flat, relatively featureless, surface of the Canadian Prairies in Alberta, Canada. It is part of the 930-kilometre-long (580 mi) Foothills Erratics Train of typically angular boulders of distinctive quartzite and pebbly quartzite.

This massive angular boulder, which is broken into two main pieces, measures about 41 by 18 metres (135 by 60 feet) and is 9 m (30 ft) high. It consists of thick-bedded, micaceous, feldspathic quartzite that is light grey, pink, to purplish. Besides having been extensively fractured by frost action, it is unweathered. Big Rock lies about 8 km (5 mi) west of the town of Okotoks, 18 km (11 mi) south of Calgary in the SE. 1/4 of Sec. 21, Township 20, Range 1, West 5th Meridian.

Big Rock is a glacial erratic that is part of a 930 km (580 mi) long, narrow (1.00 to 22.05 km (0.62 to 13.7 mi) wide), linear scatter of thousands of distinctive quartzite and pebbly quartzite glacial erratics between 30 cm (1 ft) and 41 m (135 ft) in length. This linear scatter of distinctive quartzite glacial erratics is known as the Foothills Erratics Train. The Foothills Erratics Train extends along the eastern flanks of the Rocky Mountains of Alberta and northern Montana to the International Border. The boulders and smaller gravel, which comprises the Foothills Erratics Train, consist of Lower Cambrian shallow marine quartzite and conglomeratic quartzite, which occurs only within the Gog Group and is found in the Athabasca River Valley of central western Alberta. Big Rock is the largest erratic within the Foothills Erratics Train. Lying on prairie to the east of the Rocky Mountains and like all the larger erratics, it is visible for a considerable distance across the prairie and served as a prominent landmark for Indigenous people.

== Geologic history ==
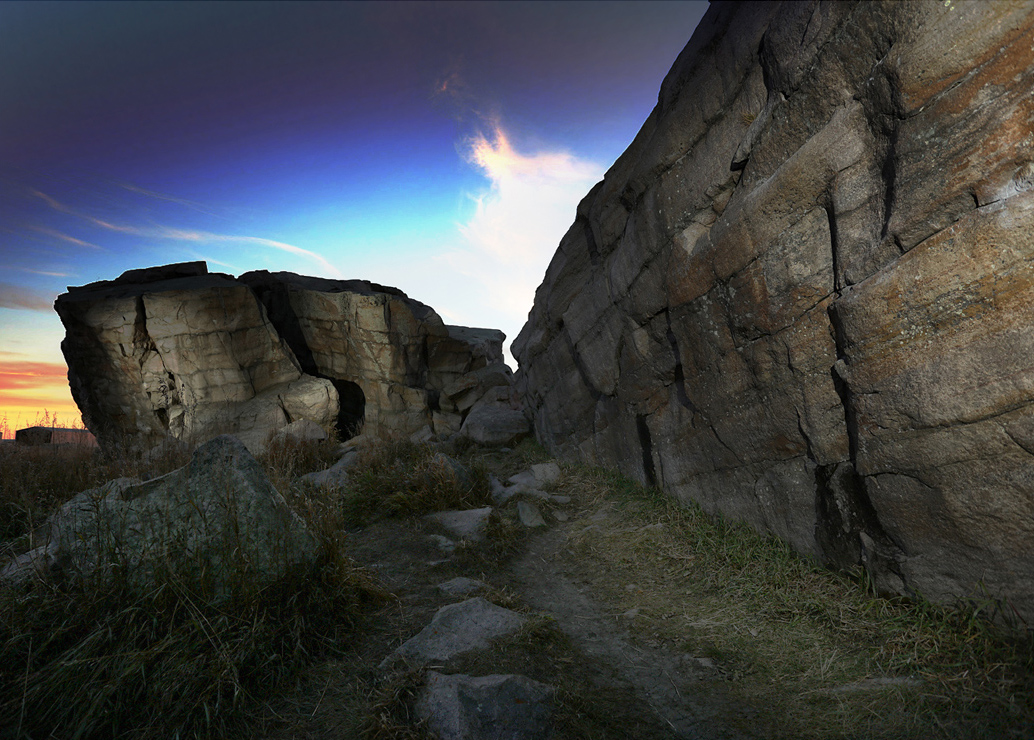
Okotoks Erratic

Near the end of the Pleistocene Period, between 12,000 and 17,000 years ago, a massive landslide occurred within the upper reaches of the Athabasca River valley. As a result of this landslide, millions of tonnes of beige to pinkish quartzite and quartzitic conglomerate slid from the side of a mountain and onto the top of a valley glacier within the Athabasca River valley. On its top, the narrow valley glacier carried eastward this mass of Gog Group quartzite and quartzitic conglomerate. Because it lay on and within the top of this glacier, the highly fractured boulders were neither broken up into smaller blocks nor rounded by movement of the glaciers that transported it. After leaving the Rocky Mountains, the valley glacier collided with the westward moving ice streams of the Laurentide Ice Sheet and both it, other Rocky Mountain valley glaciers, and Laurentide ice streams coalesced as ice streams and were diverted southward and parallel to the eastern flanks of the Rocky Mountains. Together they flowed as far south as northern Montana as an ice sheet before they stagnated and melted. When the ice sheet melted, erratics of Gog quartzite and quartzitic conglomerate were dropped to form the line of rocks known as the Foothills Erratics Train. Big Rock is one of these glacial erratics of Gog quartzite and quartzitic conglomerate that originated as part of a landslide in the Athabasca River valley and carried on the top of a glacier, later ice stream, to its present site.

== History ==
The people of the Blackfoot First Nation used Big Rock as a landmark for finding a crossing over the Sheep River (where Okotoks stands today) long before European settlement. The town's name, Okotoks, is derived from "o'kotok" [ˈokətok], meaning "rock" in the Blackfoot language, and may refer to the rock. The rock also contains native pictographs and was considered a medicine rock to the natives. In the 1970s the government declared it a Provincial Historic Site to protect its geological and cultural importance.

James Hector, a geologist with the Palliser Expedition, first documented the rock in 1863. He misidentified the feature as a klippe.

=== Indigenous perspective ===
One interesting feature of Big Rock is the large split down the middle. A Blackfoot story describes how this may have happened:

One hot summer day, Napi, the supernatural trickster of the Blackfoot peoples, rested on the rock because the day was warm and he was tired. He spread his robe on the rock, telling the rock to keep the robe in return for letting Napi rest there. Suddenly, the weather changed and Napi became cold as the wind whistled and the rain fell. Napi asked the rock to return his robe, but the rock refused. Napi got mad and just took the clothing. As he strolled away, he heard a loud noise and turning, he saw the rock was rolling after him. Napi ran for his life. The deer, the bison and the pronghorn were Napi's friends, and they tried to stop the rock by running in front of it. The rock rolled over them. Napi's last chance was to call on the bats for help. Fortunately, they did better than their hoofed neighbours, and by diving at the rock and colliding with it, one of them finally hit the rock just right and it broke into two pieces.

Not only does this story explain why the rock is in two pieces, but also why bats have squashed-looking faces. The tale provides helpful caution against taking back what you have given away.

== Present day ==
Although it has been claimed to be the largest glacial erratic in the world, e.g. Sterenberg (2013), Big Rock is not. For example, one large glacial erratic in Germany measures 3 by 6 km (2 by 4 mi) and is 9 m (30 ft) thick. Near Cooking Lake, Alberta, one of several large glacial erratics, which is called the Cooking Lake (Number 6) megablock, covers an area of at least 10 km^{2} (4 sq mi), has a length of 4.0 km (2.5 mi) and is about 10 m (33 ft) thick. Pollen studies indicate that the Lower Cretaceous sedimentary strata that comprise this glacial erratic were transported a minimum distance of about 260 km (160 mi).

Big Rock is located along the side of Highway 7, and public parking is available at the turn-off. Despite the presence of a fence around Big Rock and a sign telling people not to climb, many tourists, who visit the rock, ignore the warnings to either boulder, climb, or vandalize the 9 m (30 ft) tall erratic.

=== In popular culture ===
Big Rock Brewery in Calgary is named after Big Rock.

== See also ==
- List of individual rocks
