= Coosella =

Coosella Temporal range: Upper Cambrian

Scientific classification
- Kingdom: Animalia
- Phylum: Arthropoda
- Clade: †Artiopoda
- Class: †Trilobita
- Order: †Ptychopariida
- Family: †Crepicephalidae
- Genus: †Coosella; Lochman, 1936

Species
- Coosella helena; Coosella intermediens; Coosella prolifica

Extinct genus of trilobites

Coosella is an extinct genus from a well-known class of fossil marine arthropods, the trilobites. It lived from 501 to 490 million years ago during the Dresbachian faunal stage of the late Cambrian Period.
