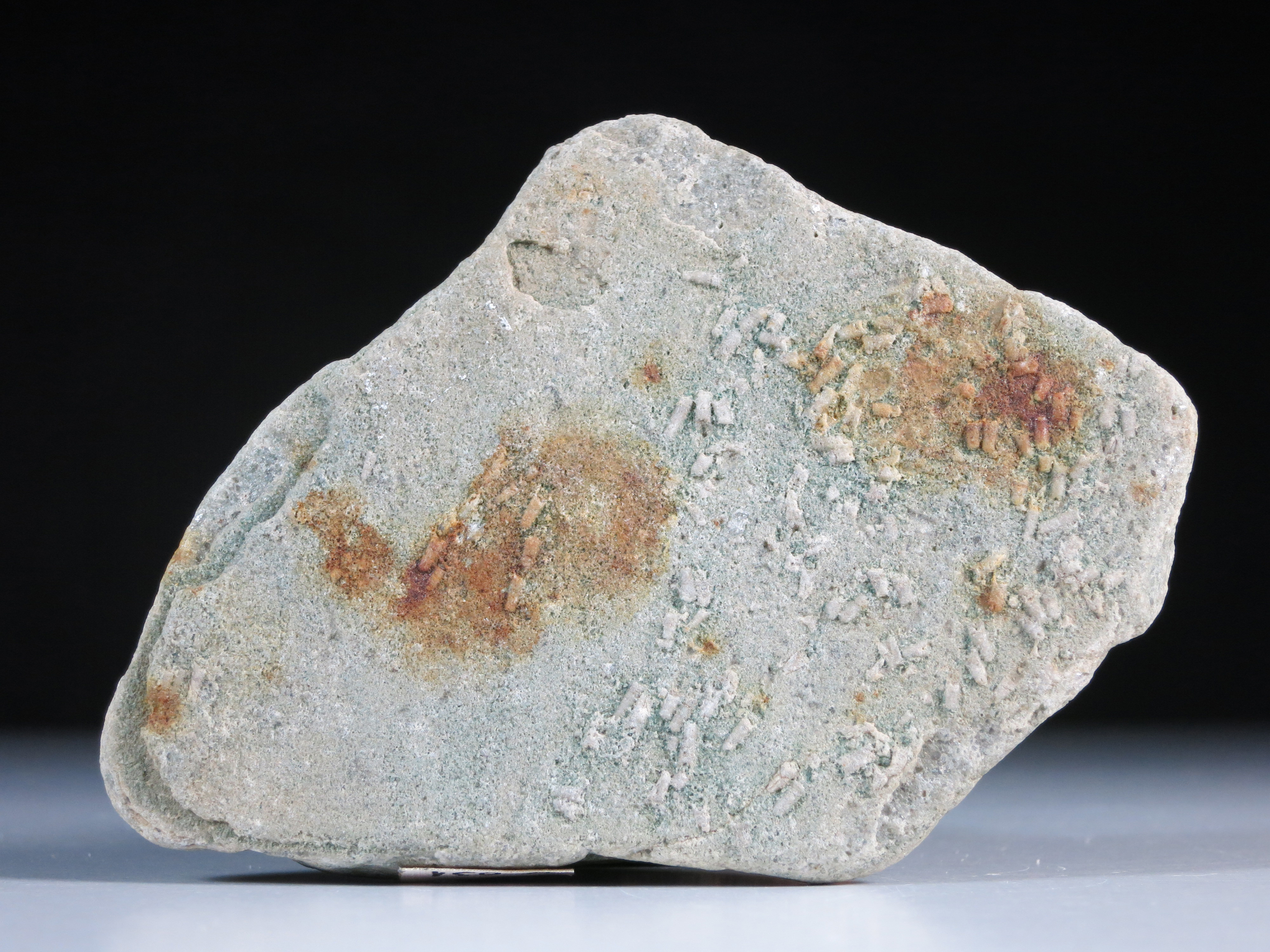
- Volborthella
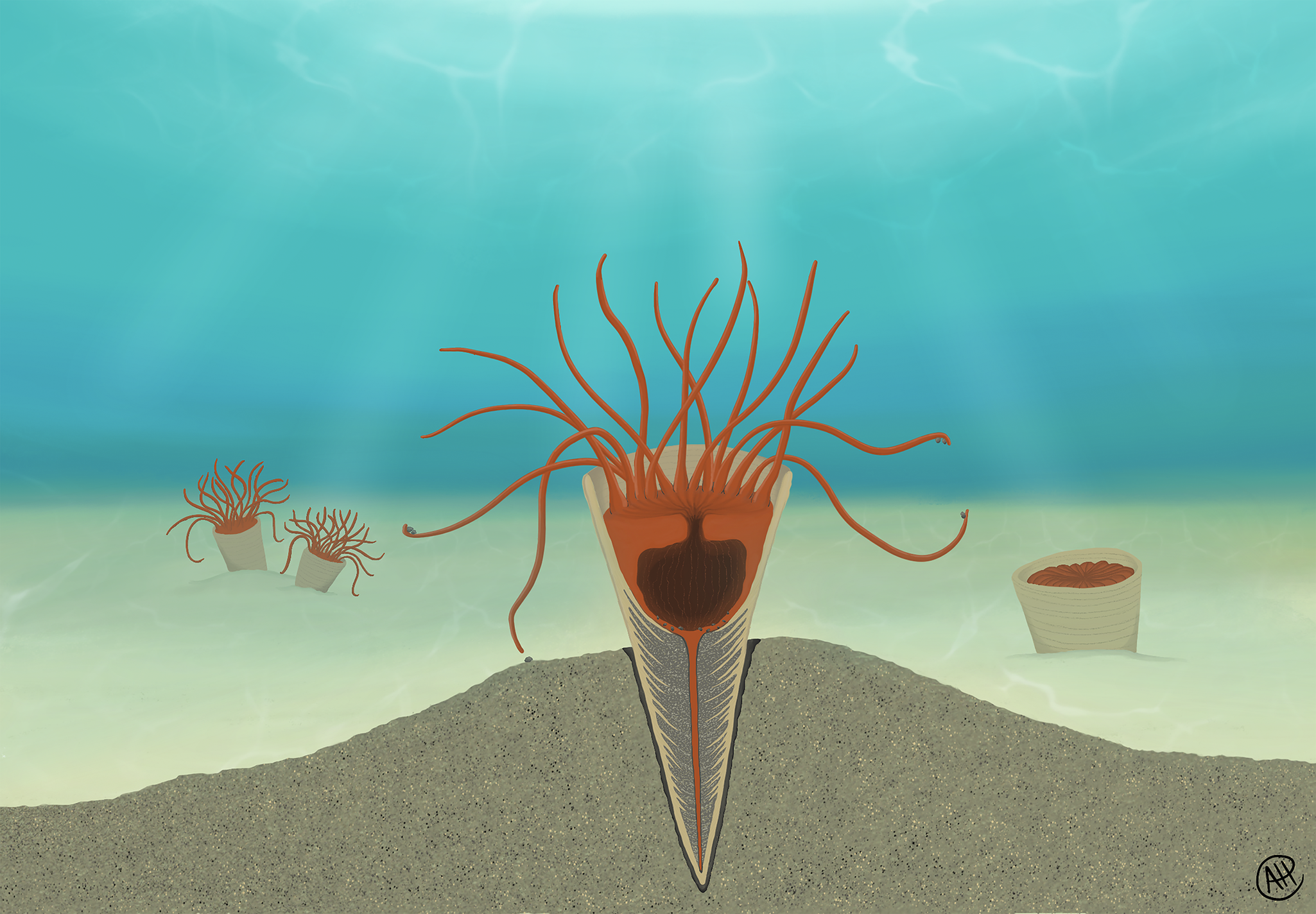
- Life restoration of Salterella as a cnidarian

Scientific classification
- Kingdom: Animalia
- Phylum: †Agmata; Yochelson, 1977

Taxa
- †Salterellidae; †Ellisell; †Salterella; †Volborthella

= Agmata =

Agmata Temporal range: Early Cambrian–Middle Cambrian

Extinct phylum of shelled animals

Agmata is a proposed extinct phylum of small animals with a calcareous conical shell. They were originally thought to be cephalopods or annelid worms. The living animals filled up to five-sixths of their shell with laminae, angled layers composed of grains of quartz or calcium carbonate detritus from the environment cemented together, with larger grains near the shell wall and smaller grains near the center. A very fine tube ran through the center of the shell. The grains may be of quartz or calcium carbonate, but are of specific shapes and materials that are rare in the surrounding rock. Though the body of the living animal is not preserved, it had to be able to find, choose, and retrieve rare grains from its environment to build the laminae.

The phylum's name comes from the Greek word for "fragments", referring to these fine fragments and grains of detritus. It was proposed by the paleontologist and geologist Ellis L. Yochelson (1928–2006) in 1977 to house the agglutinating Early Cambrian fossils Salterella and Volborthella, with the Middle Cambrian Ellisell yochelsoni later included. The poorly known Middle Cambrian fossil Vologdinella was also considered for inclusion, as it has superficial resemblance to the Agmata, but was later excluded from the group.

Currently, the phylum contains only one family, Salterellidae; a second family, Volborthellidae, was originally included but later became a synonym of the former. No orders, classes or superfamilies are used within the phylum, despite the order "Volborthellida" being previously proposed for Volborthella before the phylum's own proposal. The reasoning for this was that taxa of these ranks were not seen as necessary in a phylum with very few genera.

The genera within the group are clearly different: Salterella had a pointed shell made of calcium carbonate with a thin outer layer and a thick inner layer, and secreted a calcium carbonate cement to hold its grains in place. Volborthella was the older genus, had a blunter shell with a shallower opening, and cemented grains in place with organic material that also may have formed the outside surface of the shell.

Fossils are found in large numbers in some areas. Paleontologists have offered several different ideas of how these animals lived: filter-feeding with the points of the shells embedded in the substrate, grazing actively like snails, or lying on their sides on the substrate. Volborthella is found in silt and clay deposits, and apparently lived on tidal mudflats. Attempts to reconcile these genera as members of any other group have been rejected due to basic differences in structure, but not all paleontologists accept them as a phylum; Jones (2007) considers the shell an agglutinating test parallel to that of foraminifers. Yochelson considered Agmata to be complex multicellular animals.

A 2025 study suggested that agmatans represent a group of cnidarians, rather than a distinct phylum.
