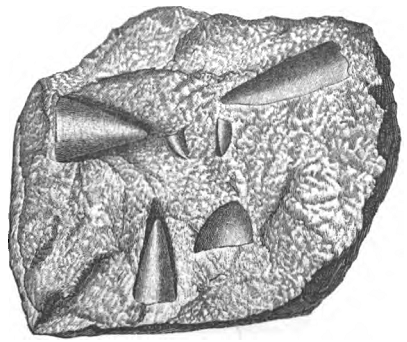
- S. pulchella
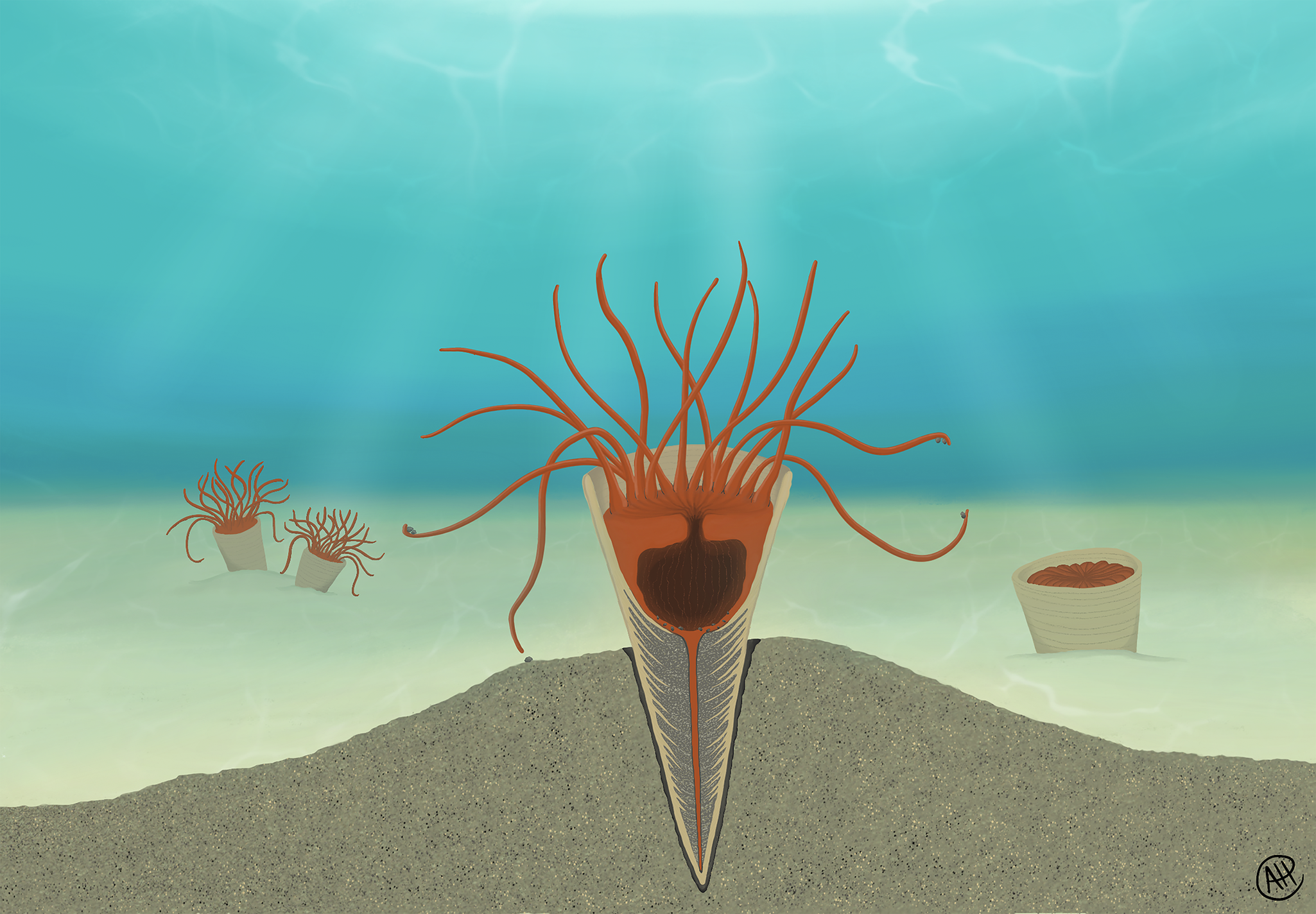
- Life restoration of Salterella as a cnidarian

Scientific classification
- Kingdom: Animalia
- Phylum: †Agmata
- Family: †Salterellidae
- Genus: †Salterella; Billings, 1861

Type species
- †Salterella rugosa (= Serpulites maccullochi Murchison, 1859) Billings, 1861

Species
- †S. conulata Clark, 1924; †S. maccullochi (Murchison, 1859)

= Salterella =

Salterella Temporal range: Early Cambrian

Extinct genus of shelled animals

Salterella is an enigmatic Cambrian genus with a small, conical, calcareous shell that appears to be septate, but is rather filled with stratified laminar deposits. The shell contains grains of sediment, which are obtained selectively (with a preference for denser grains) by a manner also observed in foraminifera. The genus was established by Elkanah Billings in 1861, and was named after the English palaeontologist John William Salter.

The genus is known from multiple locations worldwide, such as Newfoundland and Labrador and Quebec in Canada, Svalbard, the Scottish Highlands and Argentina.

The related fossil genus Volborthella was formerly placed in synonymy with Salterella by Ellis L. Yochelson in 1983, due to the similarities between the two genera (though Volborthella notably lacks an outer calcareous shell). However, Volborthella was later accepted as a separate genus again by Yochelson & Kisselev in 2003. Both genera are currently placed in the Salterellidae family in the phylum Agmata.

A 2025 study suggested that agmatans including Salterella represent a group of cnidarians.

== Species ==
At least two species of Salterella are known:

- †Salterella conulata Clark, 1924: A species that is widespread in eastern North America.
- †Salterella maccullochi (Murchison, 1859) (Synonyms: S. mexicana Lochman, 1952; S. expansa Poulsen, 1927; S. rugosa Billings, 1861, Serpulites maccullochi Murchison, 1859)

The following species placed in the genus are poorly known:

- †Salterella pulchella Billings, 1861
- †Salterella acervulosa Resser & Howell, 1938: A species that is abundant in the Kinzers Formation in Pennsylvania, but specimens of it are not well preserved.
- †Salterella curvata Shaler & Foerste, 1888: A species known only from the Weymouth Formation in Massachusetts. It was described from a single specimen, which has been lost.

The following species are doubtfully placed in the genus:

- Salterella (?) orientalis Kobayashi, 1935: A species described from a single specimen found in South Korea. Associated with Obolella cf. asiatica and a fragment of a trilobite (possibly Redlichia).

Other:

- Salterella howitti Chapman, 1923: Found in Phosphate Hill Formation, Victoria, Australia

=== Former species ===
The following species were formerly placed in Salterella, and have since been moved to other genera:

- †"Salterella" obtusa Billings, 1861: This Middle Cambrian species was moved to the genus Hyolithes d'Eichwald, 1840, and renamed Hyolithes billingsi Walcott, 1886. It was later moved again to Linevitus Syssoiev, 1958.
- †"Salterella" billingsi Safford, 1869: A Middle Ordovician species of Salterella from the Murfreesboro Limestone formation in Tennessee described by James M. Safford in 1869. However, T. H. Clark considered it distinct from other Salterella fossils, creating the genus Polylopia Clark, 1925 to encompass it.
- †"Salterella" hardmani Etheridge in Foord, 1890: This Middle Cambrian species was described from the Ord Basin of Northern Territory, Australia. It was moved to the genus Biconulites Teilhard, 1931. Much later, the genus Guduguwan Kruse, 1990 was created to contain it.
- †"Salterella" planoconvexa Tate, 1892: A species described from South Australia. It belongs in Hyolitha.

== Thin sections ==
Thin sections (plain transmitted light) of Salterella from "The Early Cambrian Fossil Salterella conulata Clark in Eastern North America", collected from the Vintage Dolomite of Pennsylvania. See image pages for detailed captions.

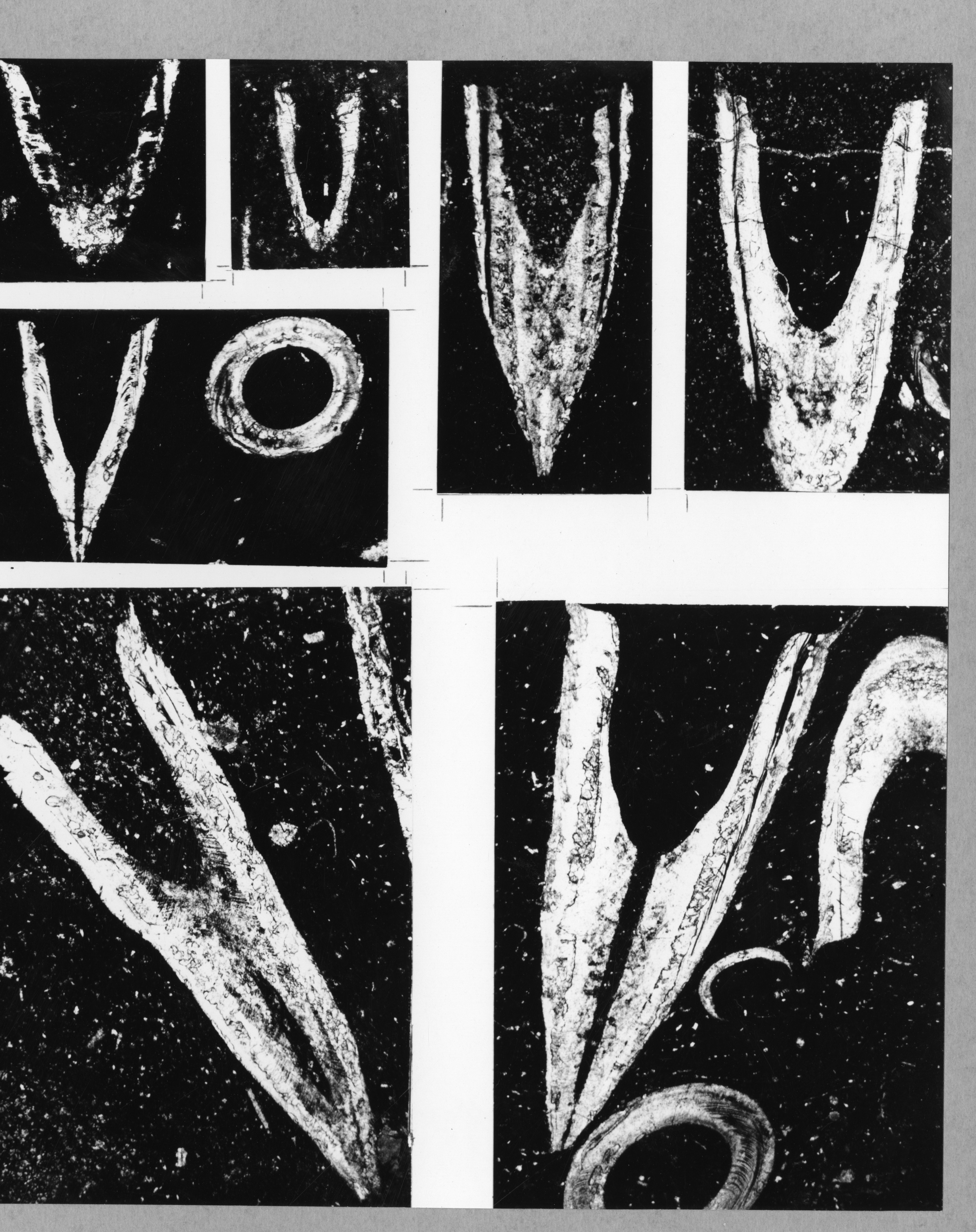

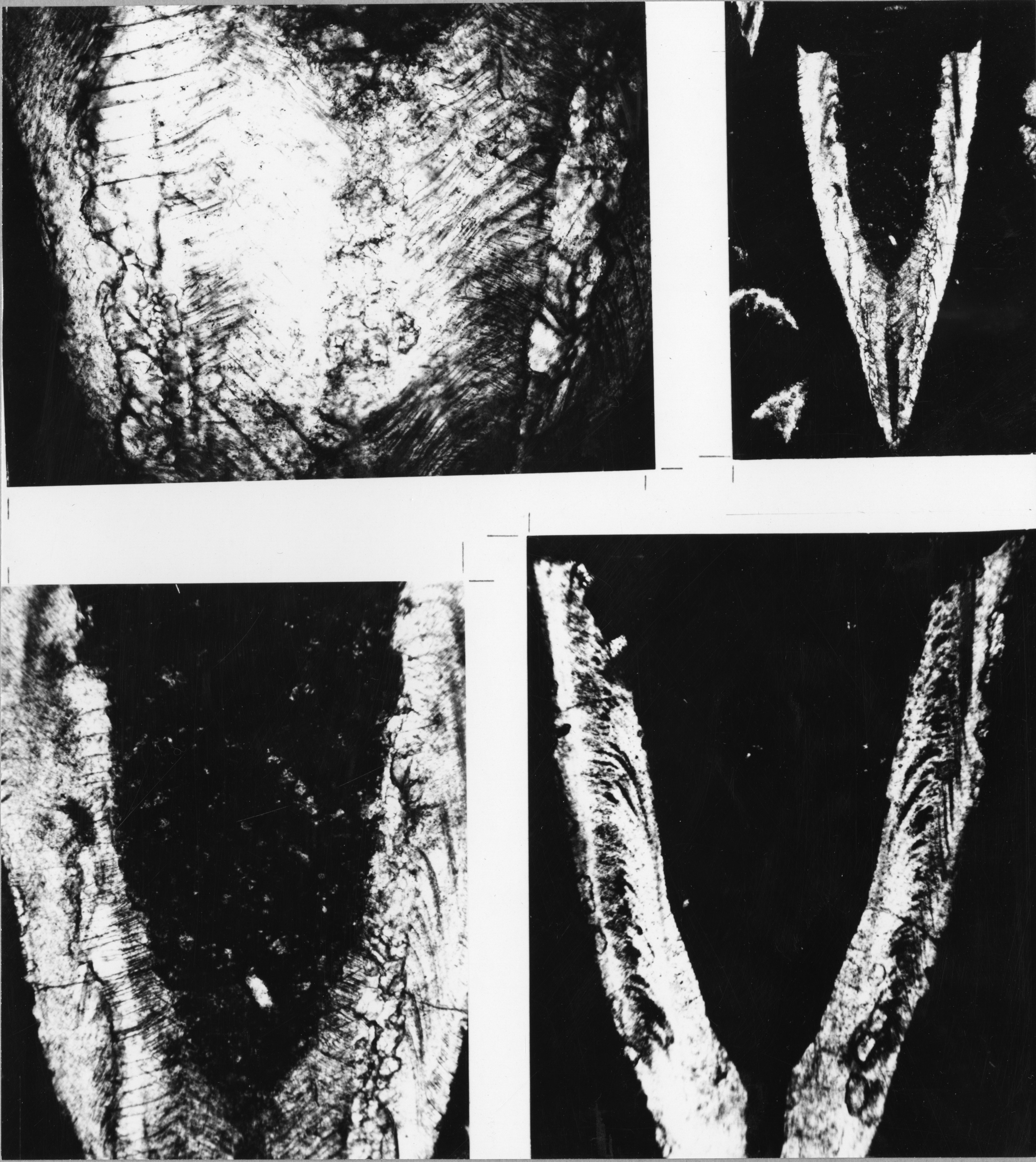

== See also ==
- Volborthella
