= Okotoks =

Town in Alberta, Canada

- Town
- Town of Okotoks
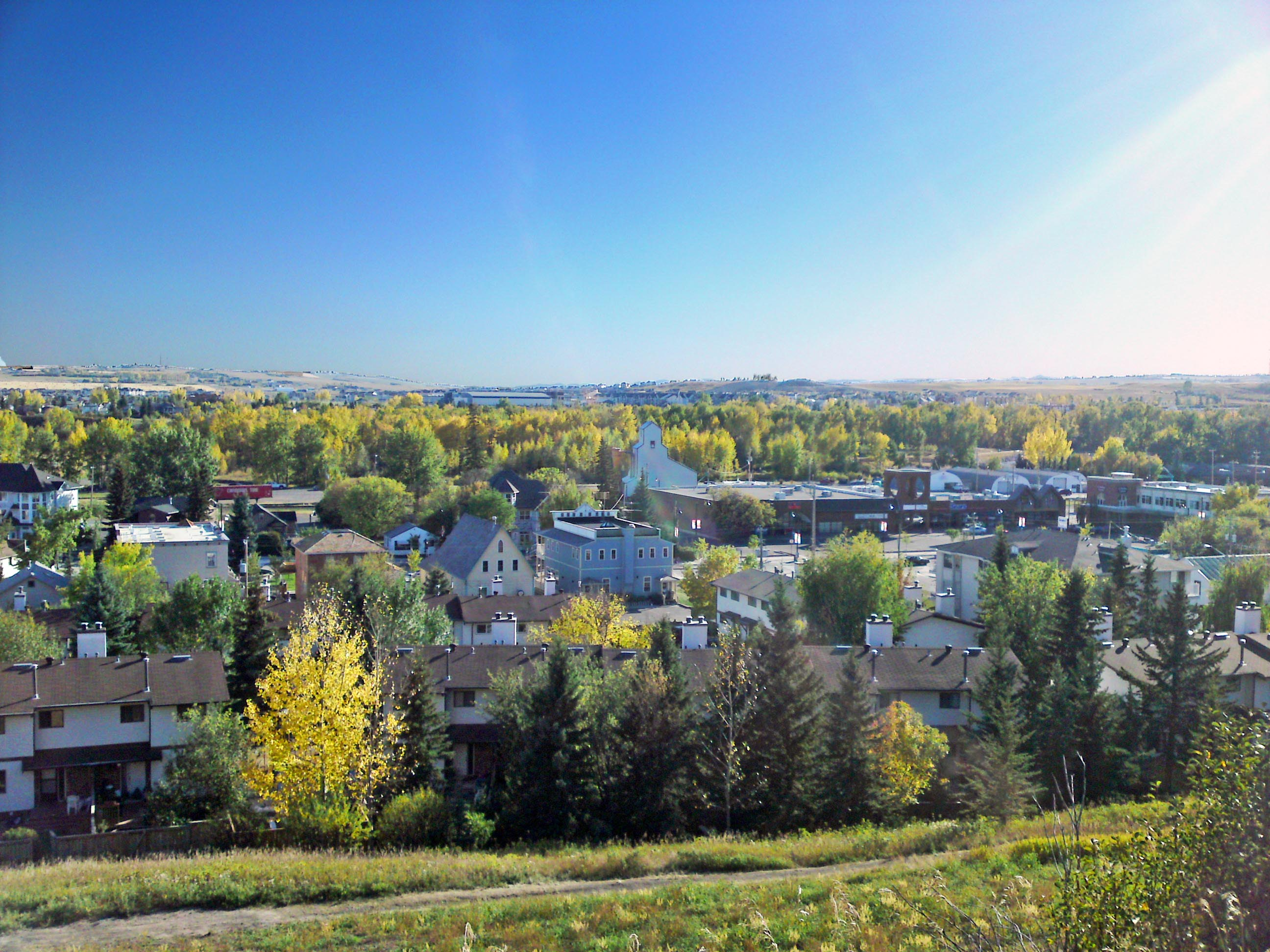
- A view of Okotoks; overlooking downtown and facing south.

- Logo
- Motto: Historic Past, Sustainable Future
- Location within Foothills County Location within Alberta Location within Canada
- Coordinates: 50°43′34″N 113°58′39″W
- Country: Canada
- Province: Alberta
- Region: Calgary Region
- Census division: 6
- Municipal district: Foothills County
- Incorporated
  - Village: 25 October 1899
  - Town: 1 June 1904

Government
  - Mayor: Tanya Thorn
  - Governing body: Okotoks Town Council: Cheryl Actemichuk; Oliver Hallmark; Ken Heemeryck; Gord Lang; Brent Robinson; Rachel Swendseid
  - CAO: Elaine Vincent
  - MP: John Barlow
  - MLA: RJ Sigurdson

Area (2021)
  - Land: 38.55 km^{2} (14.88 sq mi)
- Elevation: 1,051 m (3,448 ft)

Population (2021)
  - Total: 30,405
  - Density: 788.7/km^{2} (2,043/sq mi)
  - Municipal census (2015): 28,016
  - Estimate (2020): 31,708
- Time zone: UTC−06:00 (Alberta Time)
- Forward sortation area: T1S
- Area codes: 403, 587, 825, 368
- Highways: Highway 2A; Highway 7 Highway 549
- Waterway: Sheep River
- Website: Official website

Okotoks (/ˈoʊkətoʊks/ OH-kə-tohks, originally /ˈɒkətɒks/ OK-ə-toks) is a town in the Calgary Region of Alberta, Canada. It is on the Sheep River, approximately 38 km (24 mi) south of Downtown Calgary. Okotoks has emerged as a bedroom community of Calgary. According to the 2021 Federal Census, the town has a population of 30,214, making it one of the largest towns in Alberta.

== History ==
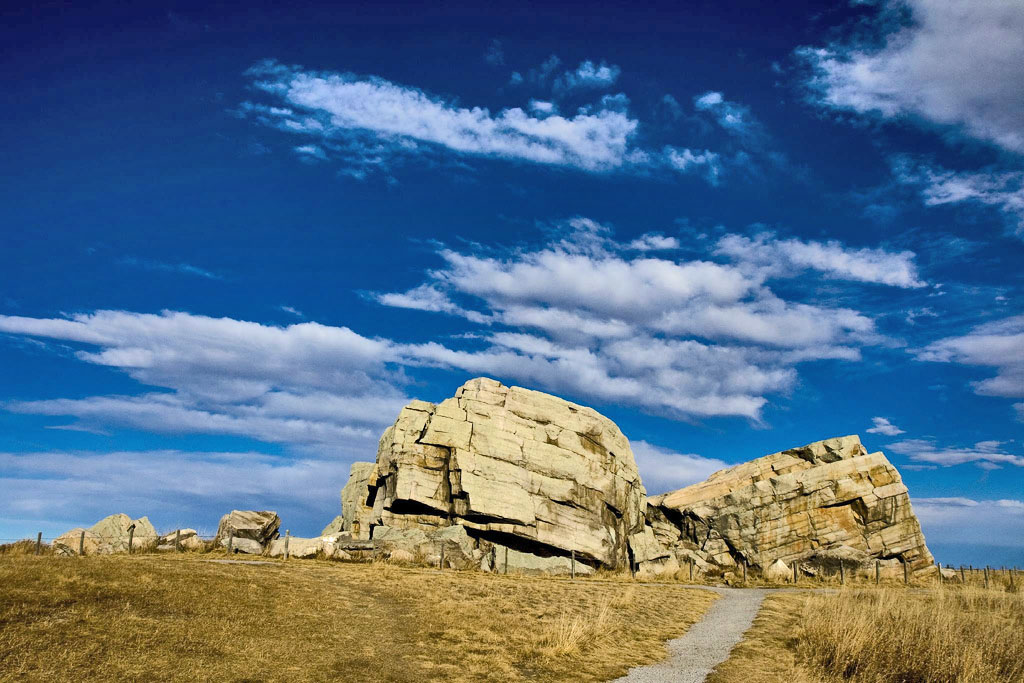
Big Rock glacial erratic

The town's name is derived from "ohkotok", the Blackfoot language word for "rock". The name may refer to Big Rock, the largest glacial erratic in the Foothills Erratics Train, situated about 7 km (4.3 mi) west of the town.

Before European settlement, journeying First Nations, members of the Blackfoot Confederacy, used the rock as a marker to find the river crossing situated at Okotoks. The tribes were nomadic and often followed large buffalo herds for their sustenance. David Thompson explored the area as early as 1800.

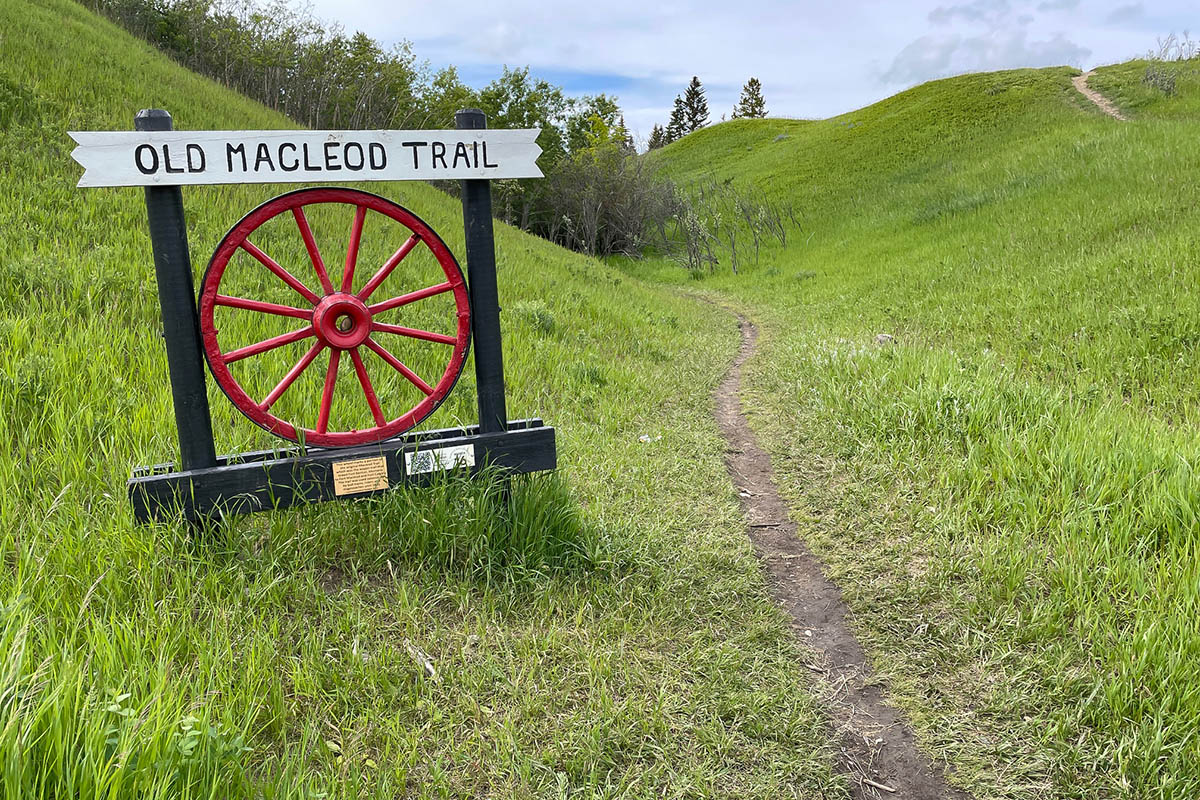
This section of the Old Macleod Trail in Okotoks passed through a ravine that made it easier for wagons, stagecoaches and horse riders to get up the northern escarpment of the Sheep River valley.

In the late 1870s and early 1880s, the site of the future town was a river crossing location on the freight wagon route from Fort Macleod to Fort Calgary. Stagecoaches also used the trail. Known as the Macleod Trail or the Macleod-Calgary Trail, the route was an extension of the Fort Benton-Fort Macleod Trail, which led from Fort Benton, Montana to Fort Macleod. There were two fords on the Sheep River, and two stopping houses were established on the north side of the river for rest and shelter for the travellers. Because of these stopping houses, the area attracted settlement. Once the railway was built through the town in 1892, the old trail fell out of use.

In 1879, the area saw the killing of the last buffalo. Government leasing of land for $0.01/acre ($0.025/ha) or $2.47/km^{2} ($6.4/sq mi) began in 1880. This created a major change in the region. The first settlers arrived in 1882.

A community grew around a sawmill that was established in 1891, and it would grow in size. The last stagecoach stopped in Okotoks in 1891 when rail service between Calgary and Fort Macleod replaced horse-drawn travel.

By 1897, the community name had changed three times, first from Sheep Creek, to Dewdney after Edgar Dewdney the Lieutenant Governor of the Northwest Territories, and later being informed by post office authorities in Ottawa of an older settlement named Dewdney in Lower Mainland, British Columbia, the name Okotoks was chosen by local businessman John Lineham. The rail line is still a main line south to the United States border, but the last of the passenger service (Dayliner unit) ended in 1971.

In 2007, the energy efficient Drake Landing Solar Community was established in Okotoks.

=== Flooding ===
Okotoks has experienced three major flooding events, in 1995, 2005 and 2013. The 2005 event, which affected much of southern Alberta, flooded virtually all lands adjacent to the Sheep River, including the central business district, were at least briefly flooded, with the most serious damage being inflicted to riverside pathways, parks and campgrounds. Okotoks was also affected by the 2013 Alberta floods.

=== Heritage conservation ===
Numerous old buildings have been restored, and one house was even resited blocks away to avoid destruction by the widening of the highway through the townsite.

== Geography ==
=== Land annexation ===
Effective 1 July 2017, the Government of Alberta approved the annexation of approximately 1,950 ha (4,800 acres) of land. Okotoks and the Municipal District of Foothills reached an agreement more than three years after the town first issued its notice of intent to seek more land to accommodate its long-term growth plans. Okotoks will gain a 60-year land supply that will enable the Town to develop housing and other services over the next several decades.

=== Water conservation ===
Although the Sheep River runs through Okotoks year round, artesian wells near the river supply the town with its water. In September 1998, Okotoks became one of the first communities in Canada to recognize its environmental limits to growth were restricted by the carrying capacity of the local watershed. In concern for the supply of water, the town announced a unique and controversial suggestion of capping its population at 25,000 residents. In an interview on The Current, Mayor Bill McAlpine stated that this objective may be politically difficult due to the surrounding region.

=== Climate ===
Okotoks experiences a humid continental climate (Köppen Dfb), with generally warm summers and long, cold winters. Rainfall is usually limited to the summer, with most of it falling between the months of May and September.

Climate data for Okotoks (1981−2010)
Month	Jan	Feb	Mar	Apr	May	Jun	Jul	Aug	Sep	Oct	Nov	Dec	Year
Record high °C (°F)	14.5 (58.1)	23.0 (73.4)	25.0 (77.0)	25.5 (77.9)	31.5 (88.7)	32.5 (90.5)	34.5 (94.1)	34.0 (93.2)	33.5 (92.3)	27.5 (81.5)	23.0 (73.4)	18.0 (64.4)	34.5 (94.1)
Mean daily maximum °C (°F)	−2.3 (27.9)	1.0 (33.8)	4.9 (40.8)	11.7 (53.1)	16.8 (62.2)	20.2 (68.4)	24.3 (75.7)	23.7 (74.7)	18.9 (66.0)	11.5 (52.7)	3.4 (38.1)	−0.5 (31.1)	11.1 (52.0)
Daily mean °C (°F)	−8.1 (17.4)	−5.0 (23.0)	−1.4 (29.5)	5.0 (41.0)	9.8 (49.6)	13.7 (56.7)	17.0 (62.6)	16.2 (61.2)	11.5 (52.7)	5.0 (41.0)	−2.3 (27.9)	−6.3 (20.7)	4.6 (40.3)
Mean daily minimum °C (°F)	−13.8 (7.2)	−10.9 (12.4)	−7.7 (18.1)	−1.7 (28.9)	2.8 (37.0)	7.1 (44.8)	9.6 (49.3)	8.6 (47.5)	4.1 (39.4)	−1.6 (29.1)	−8.0 (17.6)	−12.0 (10.4)	−2.0 (28.4)
Record low °C (°F)	−39.0 (−38.2)	−36.0 (−32.8)	−32.0 (−25.6)	−20.5 (−4.9)	−8.0 (17.6)	−1.5 (29.3)	2.0 (35.6)	−3.0 (26.6)	−9.0 (15.8)	−26.0 (−14.8)	−32.5 (−26.5)	−39.0 (−38.2)	−39.0 (−38.2)
Average precipitation mm (inches)	14.8 (0.58)	17.3 (0.68)	28.6 (1.13)	37.9 (1.49)	70.4 (2.77)	123.6 (4.87)	54.4 (2.14)	61.7 (2.43)	45.8 (1.80)	25.3 (1.00)	21.9 (0.86)	12.9 (0.51)	514.5 (20.26)
Average rainfall mm (inches)	0.3 (0.01)	0.1 (0.00)	1.6 (0.06)	16.0 (0.63)	59.1 (2.33)	123.6 (4.87)	54.4 (2.14)	61.3 (2.41)	43.4 (1.71)	10.1 (0.40)	2.3 (0.09)	0.4 (0.02)	372.6 (14.67)
Average snowfall cm (inches)	14.5 (5.7)	17.2 (6.8)	26.9 (10.6)	21.9 (8.6)	11.3 (4.4)	0.0 (0.0)	0.0 (0.0)	0.4 (0.2)	2.5 (1.0)	15.2 (6.0)	19.6 (7.7)	12.4 (4.9)	141.9 (55.9)
Average precipitation days (≥ 0.2 mm)	6.7	6.5	9.2	9.8	12.9	14.5	10.9	10.9	9.0	7.8	6.7	5.8	110.7
Average rainy days (≥ 0.2 mm)	0.2	0.3	1.3	5.7	11.8	14.5	10.9	10.9	8.6	4.4	1.3	0.5	70.4
Average snowy days (≥ 0.2 cm)	6.5	6.5	8.7	6.1	2.8	0.0	0.0	0.2	1.0	4.4	5.9	5.5	47.6
Source: Environment Canada

=== Neighbourhoods ===
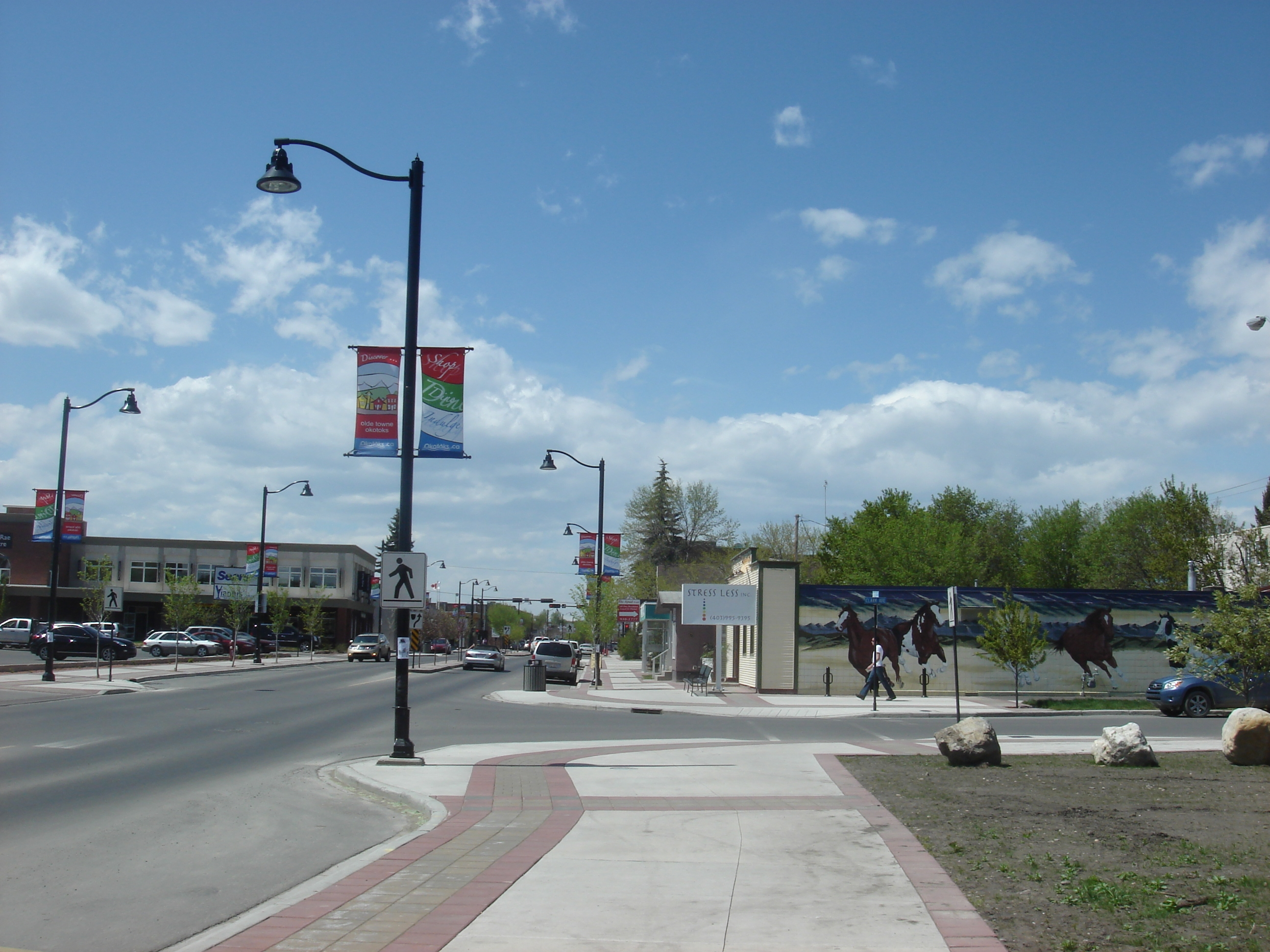
Downtown Okotoks

Neighbourhoods of Okotoks are:

- Air Ranch
- Central Heights
- Cimarron
- Cornerstone
- Crystal Shores
- Crystal Ridge
- D'Arcy
- Downey Ridge
- Drake Landing Solar Community
- Green Haven Estates
- Hunter's Glen
- Mountainview
- Olde Towne
- Rosemont
- Ranchers Rise
- Sandstone
- Sheep River Ridge
- Skunk Hollow
- Suntree
- Tower Hill
- Wedderburn
- Westmount
- Westridge
- Woodhaven

== Demographics ==
Federal census population history
Year	Pop.	±%
1901	245	—
1906	508	+107.3%
1911	516	+1.6%
1916	525	+1.7%
1921	448	−14.7%
1926	579	+29.2%
1931	760	+31.3%
1936	571	−24.9%
1941	591	+3.5%
1946	694	+17.4%
1951	767	+10.5%
1956	764	−0.4%
1961	1,043	+36.5%
1966	922	−11.6%
1971	1,247	+35.2%
1976	1,795	+43.9%
1981	3,847	+114.3%
1986	5,214	+35.5%
1991	6,720	+28.9%
1996	8,510	+26.6%
2001	11,664	+37.1%
2006	17,145	+47.0%
2011	24,511	+43.0%
2016	28,881	+17.8%
2021	30,405	+5.3%
Source: Statistics Canada

In the 2021 Canadian census conducted by Statistics Canada, the Town of Okotoks had a population of 30,405 living in 10,476 of its 10,750 total private dwellings, a change of 4.8% from its 2016 population of 29,016. With a land area of 38.55 km^{2} (14.88 sq mi), it had a population density of 788.7/km^{2} (2,042.8/sq mi) in 2021.

In the Canada 2016 Census conducted by Statistics Canada, the Town of Okotoks recorded a population of 28,881 living in 9,667 of its 9,840 total private dwellings, a 17.8% change from its 2011 population of 24,511. With a land area of 19.63 km^{2} (7.58 sq mi), it had a population density of 1,471.3/km^{2} (3,810.6/sq mi) in 2016.

The population of the Town of Okotoks according to its 2015 municipal census is 28,016, a 2.5% change from its 2014 municipal census population of 27,331.

=== Ethnicity ===
Almost 3% of Okotoks residents identified themselves as aboriginal at the time of the 2006 census.

Panethnic groups in the Town of Okotoks (2001−2021)
Panethnic group	2021		2016		2011		2006		2001	
Panethnic group	Pop.	%	Pop.	%	Pop.	%	Pop.	%	Pop.	%
European (Note: Statistic includes all persons that did not make up part of a visible minority or an indigenous identity.)	26,130	87.04%	25,330	88.81%	22,490	92.08%	16,030	93.52%	11,135	95.7%
Indigenous	1,605	5.35%	1,135	3.98%	1,065	4.36%	460	2.68%	270	2.32%
Southeast Asian (Note: Statistic includes total responses of "Filipino" and "Southeast Asian" under visible minority section on census.)	990	3.3%	840	2.95%	240	0.98%	110	0.64%	40	0.34%
South Asian	335	1.12%	335	1.17%	215	0.88%	145	0.85%	25	0.21%
African	260	0.87%	240	0.84%	165	0.68%	85	0.5%	80	0.69%
East Asian (Note: Statistic includes total responses of "Chinese", "Korean", and "Japanese" under visible minority section on census.)	250	0.83%	370	1.3%	170	0.7%	210	1.23%	80	0.69%
Latin American	250	0.83%	145	0.51%	65	0.27%	55	0.32%	0	0%
Middle Eastern (Note: Statistic includes total responses of "West Asian" and "Arab" under visible minority section on census.)	65	0.22%	0	0%	0	0%	0	0%	10	0.09%
Other/multiracial (Note: Statistic includes total responses of "Visible minority, n.i.e." and "Multiple visible minorities" under visible minority section on census.)	150	0.5%	140	0.49%	20	0.08%	35	0.2%	0	0%
Total responses	30,020	98.73%	28,520	98.29%	24,425	99.65%	17,140	99.97%	11,635	99.54%
Total population	30,405	100%	29,016	100%	24,511	100%	17,145	100%	11,689	100%
Note: Totals greater than 100% due to multiple origin responses

=== Language ===
According to the 2006 census, about 93% of residents identified English as their first language while 1.4% identified French and 1.0% identified German as their first language learned. The next most common languages were Spanish, Tagalog, Chinese, Korean, and Slovak.

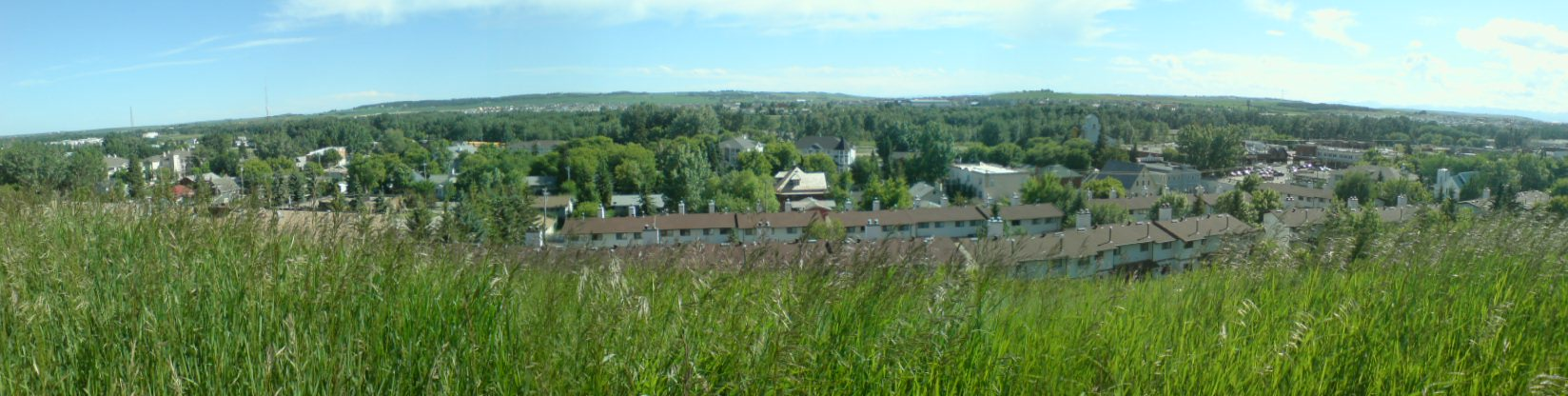
A view of Okotoks in 2007; overlooking downtown facing the south

== Economy ==
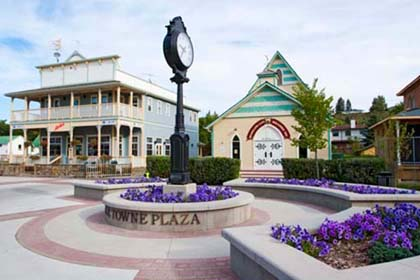
Olde Towne Plaza in downtown Okotoks

The sawmill that was established by John Lineham along the Sheep River in 1891 operated for 25 years and was a major part of the local economy. At one time it employed 135 people, producing an average of 9,100 m (30,000 ft) of lumber per day. The growth of the Canadian Pacific Railway created a demand for railway ties and the mill helped meet that demand. Logs were brought down from the west via the Sheep River. The mill has long since disappeared but one building (one of the oldest remaining in the township) still stands. It housed an award-winning (butter) dairy from the 1920s to the 1940s. It currently houses a law office and restaurant. In May 2015, the Old Creamery was severely damaged following a suspected arson attack. On 15 June 2015, the Town Council voted to demolish the building.

In 1900, just west of Okotoks, four brick-making plants were opened. Many of the first brick buildings in Okotoks (of which a number still exist) were constructed using locally made brick. The industry reached its peak in 1912, when twelve million bricks were manufactured. The outbreak of World War I caused the shutdown of “Sandstone” as it was known.

By 1906, the population had hit 1900, a figure that would not be reached again until 1977.

Oil was discovered west of Okotoks on 7 October 1913. Okotoks became the supply centre. In its heyday, from 1913 to the 1960s, Okotoks was busy with horses, wagons, and transports hauling all types of equipment to the oil fields, and crude oil back through town to refineries in Calgary.

The Texas Gulf sulphur plant (known as CanOxy) opened in 1959, employing 45 people. It was not unusual to see the bright yellow, three-story high, block-long, block-wide pile of sulphur waiting to be melted or ground up and poured into railway cars.

Since 1974, Okotoks has been hosting a collector car auction in late May. It is the longest running collector car auction in Canada.

Okotoks was one of the few communities its size with its own airport. A number of small air shows were held there over the years. It was the home of an aircraft charter company, flight school, and a helicopter flying school. The site has now evolved into an airpark community called the Calgary/Okotoks Air Park, where the property owners, if they wish, can build homes with attached hangars for their private planes. There is also a small private aerodrome, Calgary/Okotoks (Rowland Field) Aerodrome. Otherwise, like other communities in the vicinity of Calgary, it is served by Calgary International Airport.

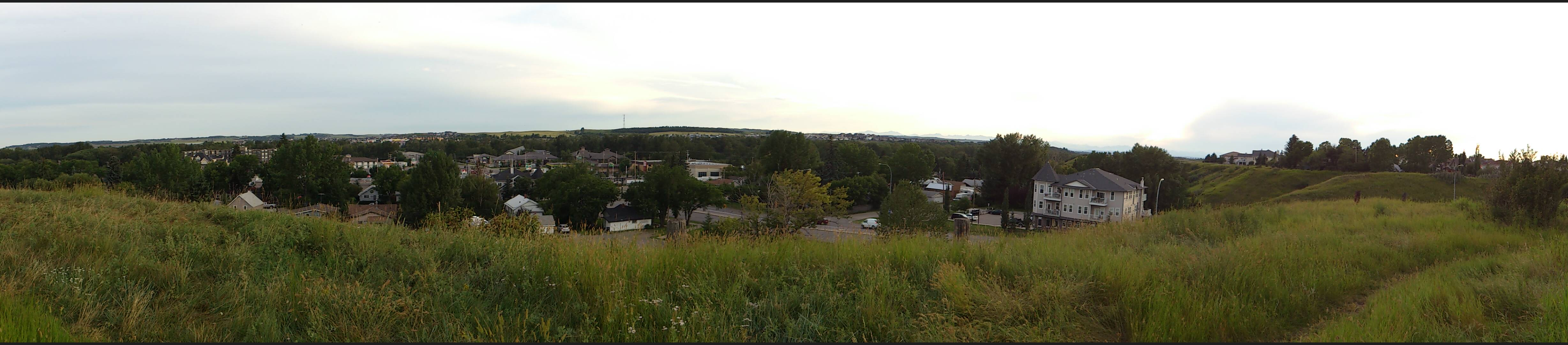
Looking southwest from the valley's Northern slope

== Transit ==
Okotoks introduced an on-demand transit service in 2019 and expanded its system with a fixed-route service on September 2, 2025. The fixed-route service operates during peak weekday hours and complements the on-demand model by providing more predictable and consistent transportation.

== Media ==
=== Print ===
- Western Wheel, with a local weekly newspaper, Great West Newspapers

=== Radio ===
- 100.9 FM — CKUV-FM (The Eagle 100.9), Golden West Broadcasting

== See also ==
- List of communities in Alberta
- List of towns in Alberta
