= James M. Safford =

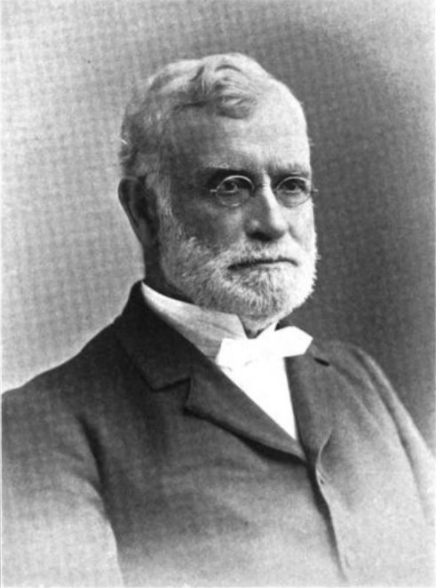
- Born: James Merrill Safford; August 13, 1822; Putnam, Ohio
- Died: July 2, 1907 (aged 84); Dallas, Texas
- Education: Yale University
- Occupations: Geologist; Chemist; University professor
- Spouse: Catherine K. Owens (m. 1859)

James Merrill Safford (1822–1907) was an American geologist, chemist and university professor.

== Biography ==
=== Early life ===
James M. Safford was born in Putnam, Ohio on August 13, 1822. He received an M.D. and a PhD. He was trained as a chemist at Yale University.

He married Catherine K. Owens in 1859, and they had two children.

=== Career ===
Safford taught at Cumberland University in Lebanon, Tennessee from 1848 to 1873. He served as a professor of mineralogy, Botany, and Economical Geology at Vanderbilt University in Nashville, Tennessee from 1875 to 1900. He was a Presbyterian, and often started his lessons with a prayer.

He served on the Tennessee Board of Health. Additionally, he acted as a chemist for the Tennessee Bureau of Agriculture in the 1870s and 1880s.

He published fifty-four books, reports, and maps.

=== Death ===
He died in Dallas on July 2, 1907.

== Bibliography ==
- James M. Safford, The Silurian basin of Middle Tennessee, with notices of the strata surrounding it. (New Haven, Printed by B.L. Hamlen, 1851).
- James M. Safford, A geological report of the coal and oil lands in Kentucky (Louisville, Kentucky: J.P. Morton & co., 1865).
- James M. Safford, Geology of Tennessee (Nashville, Tennessee: S. C. Mercer, 1869.).
- James M. Safford and Joseph Buckner Killebrew, The elements of the geology of Tennessee. Prepared for the use of the school of Tennessee, and for all persons seeking a knowledge of the resources of the state. (Nashville, Tennessee: Foster & Webb, 1900).
