= Foothills Erratics Train =

Group of glacial erratic rocks in Canada

Coordinates: 50.7058°N 114.0763°W

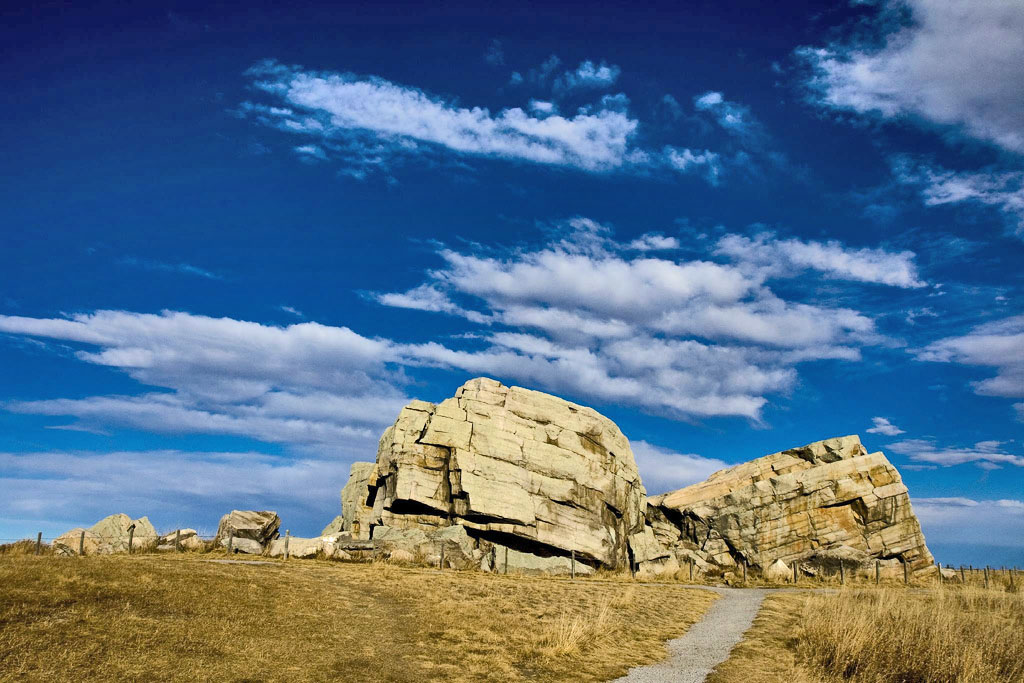
Big Rock

The Foothills Erratics Train is a 580 miles (930 km) long, narrow (0.62 miles (1.00 km) to 13.7 miles (22.0 km) wide), linear scatter of thousands of typically angular boulders of distinctive quartzite and pebbly quartzite that lie on the surface of a generally north-south strip of the Canadian Prairies. These boulders, which are between 1 foot (0.30 m) and 135 feet (41 m) in length, are glacial erratics that lie upon a surficial blanket of Late Wisconsin glacial till. The largest glacial erratic within the Foothills Erratics Train is Big Rock.

The narrow strip of prairie covered by the Foothills Erratics Train extends along the eastern flanks of the Rocky Mountains of Alberta and northern Montana. The boulders of the Foothills Erratics Train consist of pink and purple Lower Cambrian shallow marine quartzite and conglomeratic quartzite, that are not native to this region of Alberta. These rocks only occur within the Gog Group that is exposed in the Tonquin Valley in the Rocky Mountains of central western Alberta. Their specific source has been identified as being near Mount Edith Cavell in Jasper National Park. Lying on prairie to the east of the Rocky Mountains, the larger glacial erratics of the Foothills Erratics Train are visible for a considerable distance across the prairie and likely served as a prominent landmark for Indigenous people.

== Geologic history ==
Near the end of the Pleistocene, between 12,000 and 17,000 years ago, a massive landslide occurred within the Tonquin Valley in the Rocky Mountains of central western Alberta. This landslide deposited millions of tonnes of beige to pinkish quartzite and quartzitic conglomerate of the Gog Group onto the top of a valley glacier. This mass of quartzite and quartzitic conglomerate was carried eastward by this valley glacier. After leaving its valley within the Rocky Mountains, this valley glacier coalesced with other valley glaciers to form part of the Cordilleran Ice Sheet. The former valley glacier as part of this ice sheet collided with the Laurentide Ice Sheet and it and the erratics of quartzite and quartzitic conglomerate were diverted southward along the boundary between these two ice sheets. Together they flowed in a direction parallel to the eastern flanks of the Rocky Mountains as far south as northern Montana before the ice sheet stagnated and melted. As the ice sheet melted, the erratics of Gog quartzite and quartzitic conglomerate were deposited as the narrow line of rocks known as the Foothills Erratics Train.

As they were transported down valley and later southward, the highly fractured boulders and other landslide debris were neither broken up into smaller blocks, rounded, nor marked with glacial striations because they were carried either on top or in the upper part of the glacier as it moved. In addition, the atypically linear string of glacial erratics that comprise the Foothills Erratics Train was created by the parallel, non-turbulent flowage of two very large ice masses—the Cordilleran Ice Sheet to the west, and the Laurentide Ice Sheet to the east—that occurred at the boundary between them. Had they been transported by either ice at the bottom of the glacier; by water; or by ice-rafting, the highly fractured boulders and other rocky debris would have been either quickly broken up into much smaller fragments, significantly rounded, widely dispersed over the landscape, or some combination of these.
