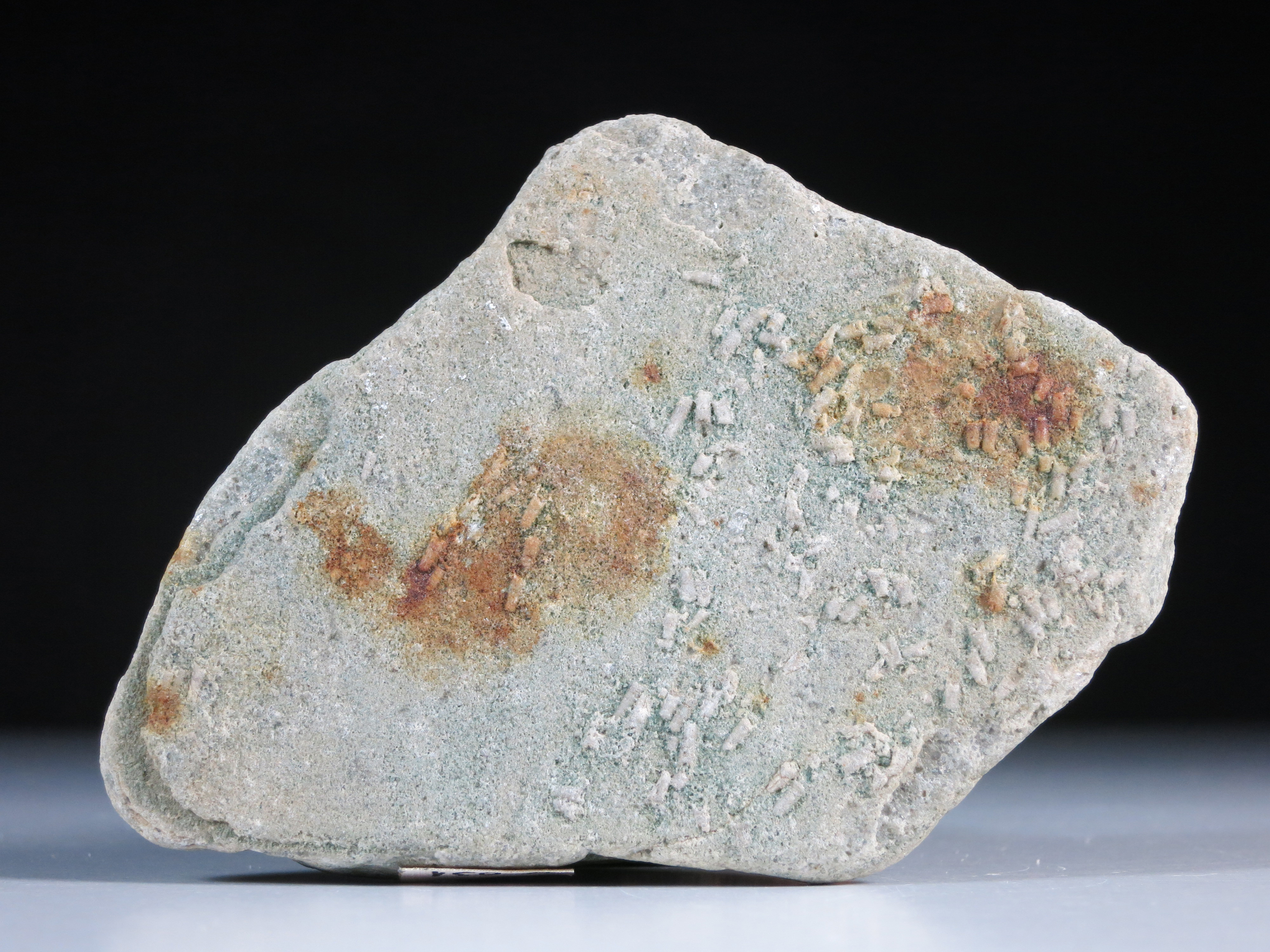
- Glauconitic sandstone with Volborthella fossils, from Stadtmuseum Berlin.

Scientific classification
- Kingdom: Animalia
- Phylum: †Agmata
- Family: †Salterellidae
- Genus: †Volborthella; Schmidt, 1888
- Species: †V. tenuis

Binomial name
- †Volborthella tenuis Schmidt, 1888

Synonyms
- Genus: Campitius Firby & Durham, 1974; Species: Campitius titanius Firby & Dunham, 1974; Volborthella conica Schindewolf, 1934

= Volborthella =

Volborthella Temporal range: Early Cambrian

Extinct animal of uncertain classification

Volborthella is an animal of uncertain classification, whose fossils pre-date 530 million years ago. It has been considered for a period a cephalopod. However discoveries of more detailed fossils showed that Volborthella’s small, conical shell was not secreted but built from grains of the mineral silicon dioxide (silica), and that it was not divided into a series of compartments by septa as those of fossil shelled cephalopods and the living Nautilus are. This illusion was a result of the laminated texture of the organisms' tests. Therefore, Volborthella's classification is now uncertain. It has been speculated that it may in fact represent a sclerite of a larger organism, on the basis of one specimen; however, it may be premature to accept this hypothesis, as the arrangement of sclerites producing this impression may have occurred by chance. The Ordovician scleritome-bearing Curviconophorus, as well as the Halwaxiids, lobopods and echinoderms, demonstrate the diversity of organisms which may produce a scleritome of this nature. The related Campitius was originally suggested to be part of a radula rather than a scleritome, but is now considered a synonym of Volborthella.

Volborthella is widespread, and a useful biostratigraphic indicator; it has been found in North America, Greenland, Spitsbergen, and northeastern Europe, and is restricted to Lower Cambrian rocks, appearing before the trilobites and co-existing with them for some time.

Volborthella has been described as a 'failed attempt in mineralisation'; it constructed its wall by agglutinating grains of sediment, much like some foraminifera, and declined in conjunction with the origin of truly-biomineralising organisms. However, its similarity to Salterella, which contained embedded sediment grains in its mineralised wall, suggests a possible biological relationship - Salterella may have begun to mineralise its agglutinated wall. Some Volborthella specimens do show taphonomic hints that some form of lightly mineralised sheath may have enclosed its agglutinated shell.

A 2025 study suggested that agmatans including Volborthella represent a group of cnidarians.
