= Christina Lochman-Balk =

Invertebrate paleontologist

- Born: October 8, 1907
- Died: March 8, 2006 (aged 98); Santa Fe, New Mexico, US
- Education: Ph.D. Paleontology
- Known for: Cambrian Biostratigraphy
- Spouse: Robert Balk
- Scientific career
- Fields: Paleontology
- Institutions: New Mexico Institute of Mining and Technology

Christina Lochman-Balk (October 8, 1907 – March 8, 2006) was an American geologist who specialized in the study of Paleozoic era fossils, formerly known as Cambrian Paleontology. Lochman specifically dealt with Cambrian trilobites and invertebrates. During her career, it was not very common for women to pursue degrees or careers in geology, which was studied mostly by men. Along with her research, she also served as a lecturer and professor at the universities Mount Holyoke, University of Chicago and the New Mexico Institute of Mining and Technology. She received two degrees from Smith College in Northampton, Massachusetts in Geology, and her doctorate at Johns Hopkins University in 1933. She married Robert Balk in 1947, who was a geology professor at the University of Chicago. Following her husband's death in 1955, she became a full professor as well as appointed head of the geology department of the New Mexico Institute of Mining and Technology in 1957. She retired from her position in 1972.

== Teaching career ==
After completing her university studies, Lochman-Balk accepted teaching positions in the Faculty of Geology at Mount Holyoke women's college, during her time there(1935-1947) that Lochman-Balk was promoted and recognized as an associate professor, an especially commendable achievement for a woman in her time. In 1947, Lochman-Balk moved to the University of Chicago with her husband and fellow geologist Robert-Balk, who was a professor of geology. She became a lecturer at the same university, rather than a professor, due to issues with nepotism because of her relationship with Robert Balk.

Lochman-Balk was unable to keep her designation of associate professor that she previously held at Mount Holyoke at the University of Chicago because it would violate contemporary nepotism rules, due to her close relationship with a current professor(her husband Robert Balk) rather than based on her merit as a geologist. After her short career at the University of Chicago, in 1952 Christina Lochman-Balk moved to Socorro, New Mexico, as her husband was offered a job at the New Mexico Institute of Mining and Technology as a member of the State Bureau of Mines and Mineral Resources. Christina also worked for the New Mexico Institute of Mining and Technology where she was a lecturer. Lochman-Balk was also given the title of "Dean of Women" which gave her the responsibility of monitoring and coordinating the activities and concerns of female students attending the institution. Lochman-Balk's husband Robert died on February 19, 1955, when the plane he was travelling on mysteriously crashed into the Domingo Baca Canyon rock spire known as Dragon’s tooth.

After her husband's death, Lochman-Balk continued her work as a lecturer at the New Mexico Institute of Technology and Mining until she became a full professor and the head of the geology department in 1957. Lochman-Balk's colleague Clay T. Smith stated that because of her renown in the fields of geology and paleontology, Lochman-Balk heightened the prestige of the program immediately. This allowed the department to provide more students with the opportunity to receive a Ph.D. in Earth Sciences. Christina Lochman-Balk retired from New Mexico Tech in 1972. She later served 2 years as a strategic geologist for the New Mexico Bureau of Mines. Upon her retirement, New Mexico Tech honored Lochman-balk with the title of emerita professor, a designation given only to female professors who made distinguished contributions to academia.

== Research ==
Intermittently throughout Lochman-Balk's career as a geologist, she researched differing aspects of Cambrian era paleontology, geology and stratigraphy throughout the United States; including Missouri, Texas, Montana, Wyoming, Idaho, and Newfoundland as well as the Taconic region in New York and the Caborca region of Mexico. Lochman-Balk's vast knowledge of Cambrian era trilobites gave her the opportunity to contribute to a variety of journals and publications in the field of Biology. These include but are not limited to; the Treatise on invertebrate paleontology in 1959, Cambrian biostratigraphy of North America in 1958 and the Upper Cambrian Faunal Patterns on the Craton in 1970.

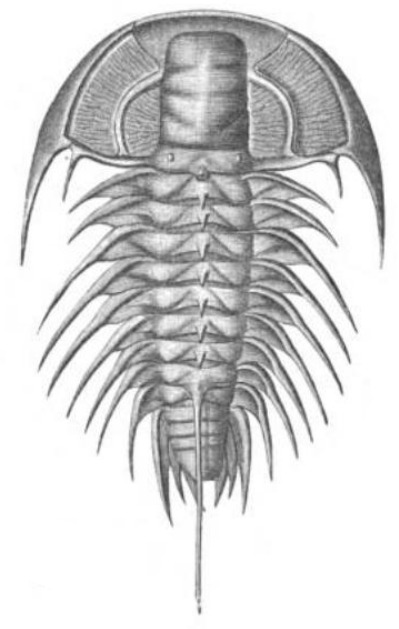
An artistic depiction of a Trilobite

=== Geological era of study ===
The fauna Lochman-Balk studied are mainly from the Cambrian Period. Within this time frame, there are the Upper, Middle and Lower Cambrian epochs. In the mountains of Montana, she studied mainly the Upper Cambrian epoch's fauna and some of the Middle Cambrian fauna. Her research also came across fauna from the Lower Ordovician epoch. One of the main early Cambrian epoch organisms she studied were Trilobites. These were a group of extinct arachnomorph arthropods from the class Trilobita. In addition to a strong focus on Trilobites specifically, Lochman-Balk was a pioneer in the study of Paleozoic Stratigraphy. She studied many of the periods contained within the Paleozoic era and the organisms during the era. It is at the end of this era in which Trilobites go extinct.

=== Location of study ===
The Cambrian fauna sequences appear across North America and Europe. Lochman-Balk was able to contribute enormously to the research of the Lower Cambrian Faunas while located in New York. To continue her research of the Upper Cambrian Faunas, Lochman-Balk relocated towards the west, in the Rocky Mountains, located in Montana. Lochman-Balk focused her research along Lodge Pole Creek because of an unbroken Upper Cambrian Sequence and the presence of exposed Middle Cambrian sequences. There was great difficulty locating fossils due to the rarity of the occurrence in the Cambrian sequences, the limited direct exposure to the faunas and the easy damage to the shells of the fossils.

=== Discoveries made ===
After many studies of different basins throughout North America, Lochman-Balk was able to relate fossilized deadwood, and Cambrian fossil layers (e.g. trilobites, brachiopods) in various river basins, establishing a common chronology between the areas. While working at the New Mexico Institute of Mining and Technology Lochman-Balk worked with James Lee Wilson in establishing a generalized description, and timeline of the Cambrian era biostratigraphy in areas of North America. During this same work they discovered that the fauna during the late and middle Cambrian era's did not have such a contrasting evolutionary spike as that found in the late Dresbachian, and Franconian era's. This being the case they were able to establish that the fossils have remained unchanged for a long-time period. This set of characteristics makes it hard to establish a more precise timeline than could be developed with fossils found in the late Dresbachian and Franconian era's. That being said, the widespread distribution of Cambrian era fossils across North America made them a helpful index fossil. As more places were discovered that contained the fossils, it became easier to give context to the entire biostratigraphy in those areas. In 1939, Lochman-Balk’s research lead her to an advanced conclusion that the Elvinia zone of the basal Franconian had a more direct correlation to the base of the European section of the Upper Cambrian as opposed to the previously believed location of the Cedaria zone in the North American section. In the years following, additional information and evidence was collected supporting this discovery as geologists were becoming more familiar with the faunas of North American zones. Lochman-Balk’s work involving this concept enabled future zonal correlations to be much more exact.

== Notability ==
During the era in which Lochman-Balk's career took place (1933-1972) women were beginning to enter nontraditional professions and striving to succeed in fields dominated by men. Lochman-Balk was able to rise through the ranks and continually achieve titles and recognition that few women had ever received in the field of Geology through her own merit. She achieved great success and acclaim within the fields of geology and paleontology, being elected a fellow of both the American Association for the Advancement of Science and the Geological Society of America. In 1996, Lochman-Balk was recognized for her contribution to paleontology receiving the "Presidents Citation" from the paleontology society.
