= List of breweries in Wisconsin =

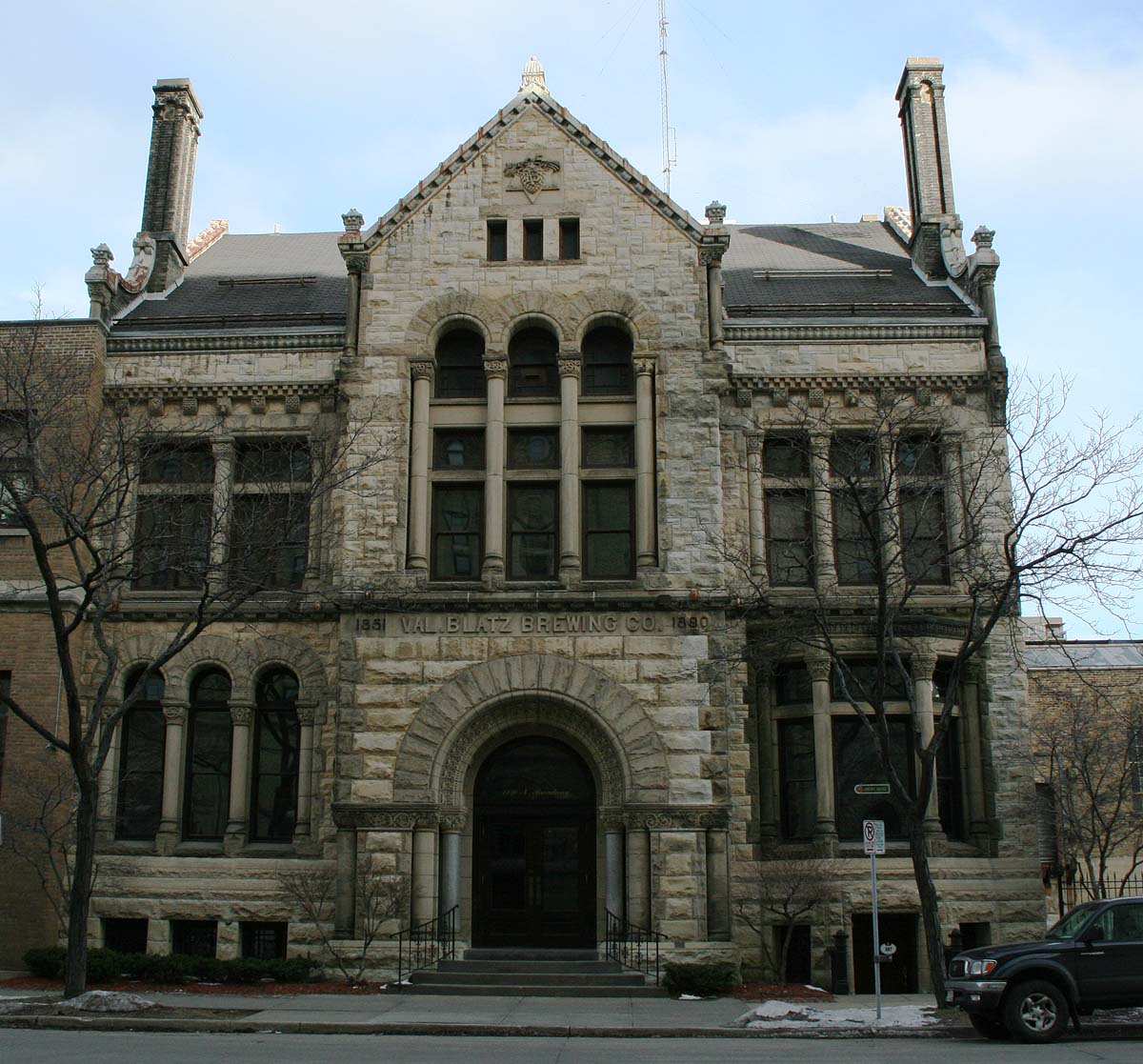
Valentin Blatz Brewing Company office building in Milwaukee

In 2012, Wisconsin ranked 11th nationally in craft breweries per capita.

Breweries in Wisconsin produce many different styles of beer.

Some breweries package their beer in bottles or cans for retail sale. Some breweries produce kegs of beer, to be sold on draft at taverns and restaurants, or at the brewery's own tap room. Brewpubs combine brewing operations with full-service restaurants. Commercially licensed breweries use one or several of these methods to sell their products.

== Breweries ==
| Brewery | Location | Date | Notes |
|---|---|---|---|
| 3 Sheeps Brewing Company | Sheboygan | 2012 | |
| 608 Brewing Company | La Crosse | 2018 | |
| Ahnapee Brewery | Algoma & Suamico | 2013 | Taproom in Algoma opened in 2013. 2nd location (Brewery & Taproom) opened in Suamico in 2020. |
| Ale Asylum | Madison | 2005 | Production brewery with a brewpub. |
| ALT Brew | Madison | 2015 | Gluten free brewery and tap room. |
| Amorphic Beer | Milwaukee | 2021 | Brewery and Taproom, with draft and canning capabilities, plus private event space in a historic cream city brick building. |
| Angry Minnow Brewing Company | Hayward | 2004 | Brewpub. |
| Appleton Beer Factory | Appleton | 2015 | Brewpub. |
| Badger State Brewing Company | Green Bay | 2013 | Destination brewery grounds include a tap room, beer garden, and upscale event hall located in the historic Stadium District near Lambeau Field. |
| Bare Bones Brewery | Oshkosh | 2015 | Brewery and taproom. |
| Barrel 41 Brewing Company | Neenah | 2018 | Brewery and taproom. |
| Bavarian Bierhaus | Glendale | 2016 | Brewery, restaurant and Milwaukee's oldest Oktoberfest. |
| Big Head Brewing Co. | Wauwatosa | 2013 | Diabetic-friendly brewery and taproom. |
| Biloba Brewing Company | Brookfield | 2014 | Small batch brewery. Tasting room closed late 2016 and is expected to open at a new location in 2017. |
| Black Husky Brewing | Milwaukee | 2016 | Established in 2010, moved from Pembine, WI to Milwaukee's River West neighborhood. |
| Bloomer Brewing Company | Bloomer | 2013 | Brewery and taproom, opened in the historic Bloomer Brewery building built in 1889. |
| Blue Herron Brewpub | Marshfield | 2005 | Brewpub. |
| Boulder Junction Brewing Co. | Boulder Junction | 2026 | Brewery and taproom. |
| Brewery Nonic | Menomonie | 2018 | Located in the historic Menomonie Station. They will be brewing on a 5 BBL system with 5 BBL fermenters. |
| The Brewing Projekt | Eau Claire | 2015 | Brewery and taproom located on the Chippewa River in Eau Claire, WI |
| Broken Bat Brewing Company | Milwaukee | 2017 | First contemporary brewery in Milwaukee's Historic Third Ward. |
| Bull Falls Brewing Company | Wausau | 2025 | Brewery, taproom, and biergarten. Replaced Bull Falls Brewery with new owners of facility in 2025. |
| Capital Brewery | Middleton | 1984 | |
| Central Waters Brewing Company | Amherst | 2007 | Production brewery with a taproom. Opened in Junction City in 1998, moved to Amherst in 2007. |
| Cercis Brewing Company | Columbus | 2018 | Microbrewery Opened in Columbus in 2018 |
| City Brewing Company | La Crosse | 1999 | Large production brewery that contract brews beer, and produces other beverages, for a number of different brands. The company also operates breweries in Latrobe, Pennsylvania and Memphis, Tennessee. |
| Commerce Street Brewery | Mineral Point | | Brewpub, inn, and cottages. |
| Company Brewing | Milwaukee | 2015 | Riverwest neighborhood. Formerly Stonefly Brewing. |
| Component Brewing Company | Milwaukee | 2018 | Lincoln Warehouse. |
| Cross Plains Brewery | Cross Plains | 1995 | Owner of the Esser's Best brand, originally brewed since 1863. Brewing operations began at Stevens Point Brewery, but have since moved to Sand Creek Brewing Company in Black River Falls, WI. |
| Dead Bird Brewing Company | Milwaukee | 2015 | Opened Milwaukee Brewery in 2019 - Small batch brewery. |
| Delafield Brewhaus | Delafield | | 300-seat restaurant and brewpub. |
| District 1 Brewing Company | Stevens Point | 2020 | 10 barrel Brewery, Taproom, and Entertainment Venue. |
| Door County Brewing Company | Baileys Harbor | 2013 | Brewery, taproom, and music hall. |
| Duesterbeck's Brewing Company | Elkhorn | 2019 | Brewery and taproom on a farm. |
| Eagle Park Brewing & Distilling Company | Milwaukee | 2017 | Production brewery and taproom founded by brothers Max & Jackson Borgardt and Jake Schinker in 2017 with locations in Milwaukee and Muskego. |
| Earth Rider Brewery | Superior | 2017 | |
| East Troy Brewery | East Troy | 2018 | Brewpub within a refurbished state bank building. |
| Enlightened Brewing | Milwaukee | 2013 | Small batch brewery and taproom located in the Bay View neighborhood. Founded in 2013. Taproom opened in 2016. |
| Explorium Brewpub | Greendale | 2017 | Brewpub. |
| The Fermentorium Brewery & Tasting Room | Cedarburg | 2016 | Brewery and tasting room. |
| Fifth Ward Brewing Company | Oshkosh | 2017 | |
| Fox River Brewing Company | Oshkosh, Wisconsin | 1995 | Operates 2 breweries, the original in Oshkosh and a 2nd in Appleton. Home of the BLU Bobber Blueberry ale. |
| Furthermore | Black River Falls | 2015 | Purchased by Sand Creek Brewing Company. Moved from Spring Green, WI. |
| Geneva Lake Brewing Company | Lake Geneva | 2011 | Debuted first beer in 2012. |
| Giant Jones Brewing Company | Madison | 2018 | |
| Good City Brewing | Milwaukee | 2016 | Brewery and taproom opened on Milwaukee's East Side neighborhood. |
| Gray Brewing Company | Janesville | 1856 | One of the oldest family-owned beverage companies in the United States |
| Great Dane Pub & Brewing Company | Madison | 1994 | Brewpub. Great Dane has four locations in the Madison area. |
| Grumpy Troll Brew Pub | Mt. Horeb | 2000 | Brewpub and pizzeria. |
| Hacienda Beer Company | Baileys Harbor/Milwaukee | 2018 | Brewed in Baileys Harbor with taprooms there and in Milwaukee |
| H.H. Hinder Brewing Company | Waupaca | 2017 | Brewery and taproom |
| Hillsboro Brewing Company | Hillsboro | 2014 | Brewpub. |
| Hinterland Brewery | Green Bay | 1995 | Brewery and restaurant. |
| Hop Haus Brewing Company | Fitchburg | 2015 | Brewery/restaurant/Patio/events space. |
| Inventors Brewpub | Port Washington | 2017 | Located on 1847 historic site of Lakeside Brewery, Port Washington Brewing Company and Old Port Brewing. |
| Jacob Leinenkugel Brewing Company | Chippewa Falls | 1867 | |
| Karben4 Brewing | Madison | 2012 | Brewpub. |
| K Point Brewing | Eau Claire | 2016 | An offshoot of the existing Coffee Grounds, a coffee/beer/wine/liquor specialty store, the brewery derives its name from the ski jumping term K-point. |
| Lake Louie Brewing | Arena | 1999 | |
| Lakefront Brewery | Milwaukee | 1987 | |
| Lazy Monk Brewing | Eau Claire | 2011 | Expanded tap room in 2013, and moved to its current location in 2016. The brewery is capable of producing 500 barrels of beer per year. |
| Lion's Tail Brewing Co. | Neenah | 2015 | Brewery and taproom. |
| Littleport Brewing Company | Racine | 2020 | Started homebrew club in 2001, opened homebrew store in 2006, culminating in 10 BBL Brewery and taproom in 2021. Serves both craft beer and homemade soda. Winery coming soon. |
| Lone Girl Brewing Company | Waunakee | 2016 | Craft brewery, brewpub, and restaurant. |
| Low Daily Beer Co. | Burlington | 2020 | Brewery and taproom |
| Lucette Brewing Company | Menomonie | 2010 | |
| McFleshman's Brewing Company | Appleton | 2018 | |
| Melms Brewing Company | Hartland | 2018 | |
| Miller Brewing Company | Milwaukee | 1855 | Operates breweries in a number of locations. It is now a subsidiary of Molson Coors Brewing Company. |
| Milwaukee Ale House | Milwaukee | 1997 | Brewpub opened in 1997. The Milwaukee Brewing Company production brewery opened in 2007. A second brewpub in Grafton opened in 2008. |
| Minocqua Brewing Company | Minocqua | 2006 | Owned by Kirk Bangstad. |
| Minhas Craft Brewery | Monroe | 2006 | Founded in 1845 as the Monroe Brewing Company, the company has changed hands many times, and became the Minhas Craft Brewery in 2006. |
| MobCraft Brewery | Milwaukee | 2016 | Moved from Madison to current Milwaukee brewery and taproom in Milwaukee's Walker's Point neighborhood. |
| New Glarus Brewing Company | New Glarus | 1993 | |
| Next Door Brewing Company | Madison | 2013 | Casual brewpub and restaurant. Craft beer made on-site and locally sourced food menu. Began distribution in December 2015. |
| Northwoods Brewpub | Osseo | 2015 | Opened in 1997 and moved to its current location in Osseo in 2015. |
| Octopi Brewing Company | Waunakee | 2015 | Contract brewer opened in 2015 with its own brand, 3rd Sign Brewery. |
| Oliphant Brewing | Somerset | 2014 | Brewery and taproom. |
| Omega Brewing Experience | Omro | 2018 | Brewery and taproom. |
| One Barrel Brewing Company | Madison | 2012 | Brewery and taproom. |
| O'so Brewing Company | Plover | 2007 | Brewery and taproom. |
| Parched Eagle Brewpub | Westport | 2015 | Brewpub. |
| Pearl Street Brewery | La Crosse | 1999 | Brewery and taproom. |
| Port Huron Brewing Company | Wisconsin Dells | 2012 | |
| Potosi Brewery | Potosi | 2008 | Founded in 1852, closed in 1972, restored and reopened in 2008. Brewpub and site of the National Brewery Museum. |
| Public Craft Brewing Company | Kenosha | 2012 | Brewery and taproom. |
| R'Noggin Brewing Co | Kenosha | 2016 | |
| Rail House Restaurant & Brewpub | Marinette | 1997 | |
| Raised Grain Brewing Company | Waukesha | 2015 | Brewery and taproom. |
| Red Eye Brewing Company | Wausau | 2007 | |
| Rhinelander Brewing Company | Rhinelander | 2018 | Brewery opened in 2018. Also contract-brewed by Minhas Craft Brewery in Monroe, Wisconsin since 2009. The original brewery was founded in 1882 and continued until 1967. |
| Rock County Brewing | Janesville | 2016 | Nano brewery. |
| Rocky Reef Brewing Company | Woodruff | 2015 | Brewery and tasting room. |
| Rowland's Calumet Brewing Company | Chilton | 1990 | Also produces soda. |
| Rush River Brewing Company | River Falls | 2004 | Opened in 2004, taproom opened in 2015. |
| Rustic Road Brewing Company | Kenosha | 2012 | Brewery and taproom. |
| St. Germain Brewing Company | St. Germain | 2022 | Brewpub located in a former supper club. |
| Sand Creek Brewing Company | Black River Falls | 1997 | 2004 Moved from Downing in merger with Pioneer Brewing Company. Opened in Downing in 1999. |
| Second Salem Brewing Company | Whitewater | 2014 | Urban brewpub. |
| Shipwrecked Brew Pub | Egg Harbor | 1997 | |
| Some Nerve Brewing Company | Manitowish Waters | 2018 | Nanobrewery with Taproom |
| South Shore Brewery | Ashland | 1995 | Brewpub. |
| Sprecher Brewery | Glendale | 1985 | Produces soda as well as beer. |
| Starboard Brewing Company | Sturgeon Bay | 2014 | Nanobrewery and taproom. |
| Starkweather Brewing Company | Madison | 2022 | Nanobrewery in former site of Next Door Brewing |
| Stevens Point Brewery | Stevens Point | 1857 | Large production brewery that makes Point beer, and also contract brews beer for several different brands. |
| Stillmank Brewing Company | Green Bay | 2014 | Brewery and taproom. |
| Sunshine Brewing Company | Lake Mills | 2019 | Nanobrewery and restaurant. |
| SwitchGear Brewing Company | Elkhart Lake | 2017 | Brewpub. |
| Third Space Brewing Company | Milwaukee | 2016 | Brewery and taproom in Milwaukee's Menomonee Valley. |
| Thirsty Pagan Brewing | Superior | 2009 | Brewpub. |
| Titletown Brewing Company | Green Bay | 1996 | Brewery and restaurant. Restaurant and brewery located in a railroad depot on the National Register of Historic Places along the Fox River. Expansion in 2014 added a tap room, event space, and rooftop bar in an old industrial building on the same block. State-wide distribution. |
| Tribute Brewing Company | Eagle River | 2012 | Brewery and taproom. |
| Tyranena Brewing Company | Lake Mills | 1999 | Bottling line and taproom. |
| Urban Harvest Brewing Company | Milwaukee | 2016 | Brewery and taproom. |
| Valkyrie Brewing Company | Dallas | 1994 | Opened as Viking Brewing Company, renamed to Valkyrie Brewing Company in 2011. |
| Vennture Brew Company | Milwaukee | 2018 | |
| Vintage Brewing Company | Madison | 2010 | Brewpub. |
| Water Street Brewery | Milwaukee | 1987 | Milwaukee's oldest brewpub with other locations in Oak Creek, Grafton and Delafield. |
| Westallion Brewing Co. | West Allis | 2017 | First microbrewery in West Allis. Founded by former employee of Lakefront Brewery. |
| Wisconsin Brewing Company | Verona | 2013 | Brewery. |
| Working Draft Beer Company | Madison | 2018 | |
| Young Blood Beer Company | Madison | 2020 | |
| Zymurgy Brewing Company | Menomonie | 2018 | Downtown Menomonie. |

== Gallery of Breweries in Wisconsin ==
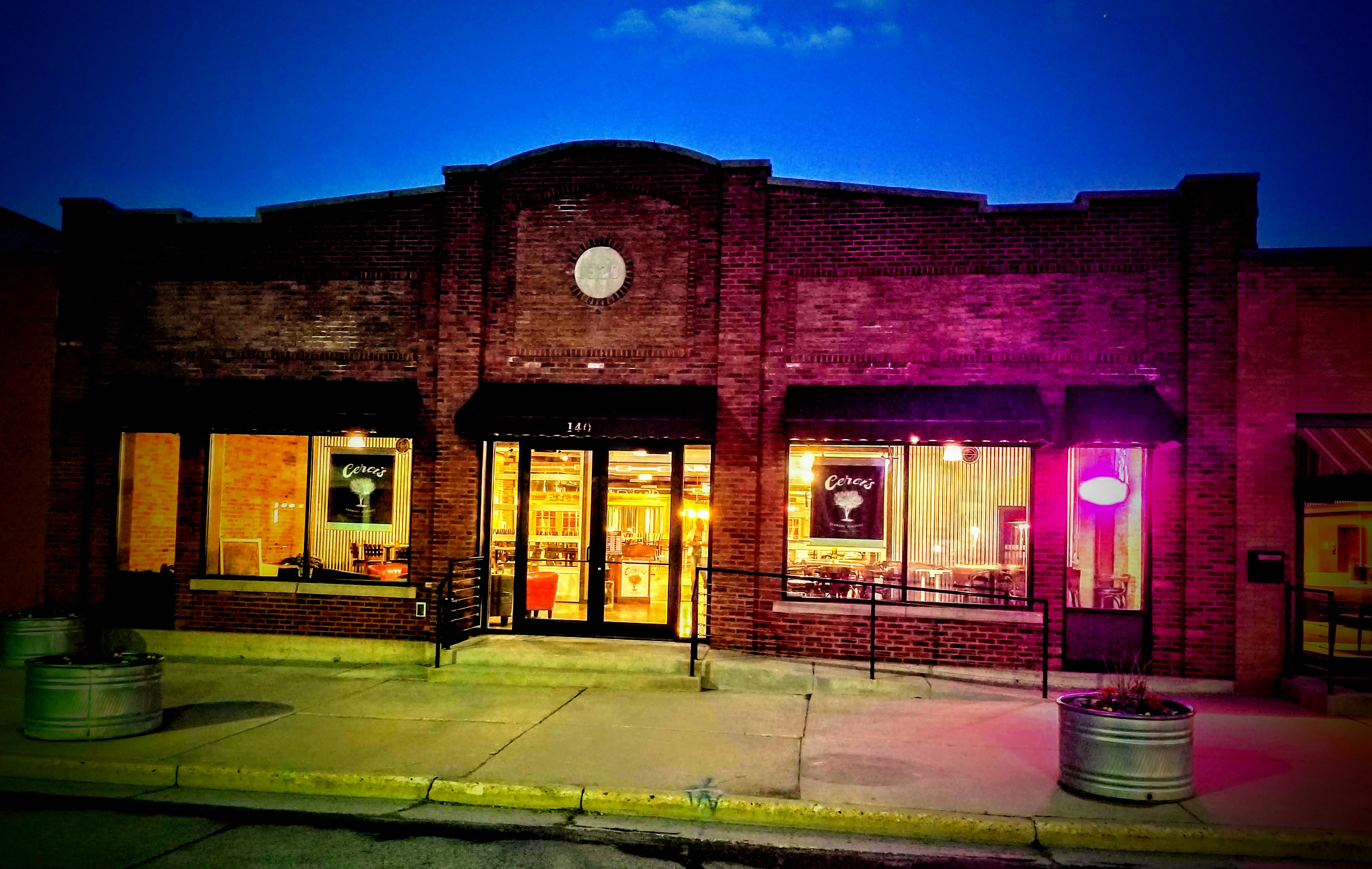
Cercis Brewing, Columbus, Wisconsin

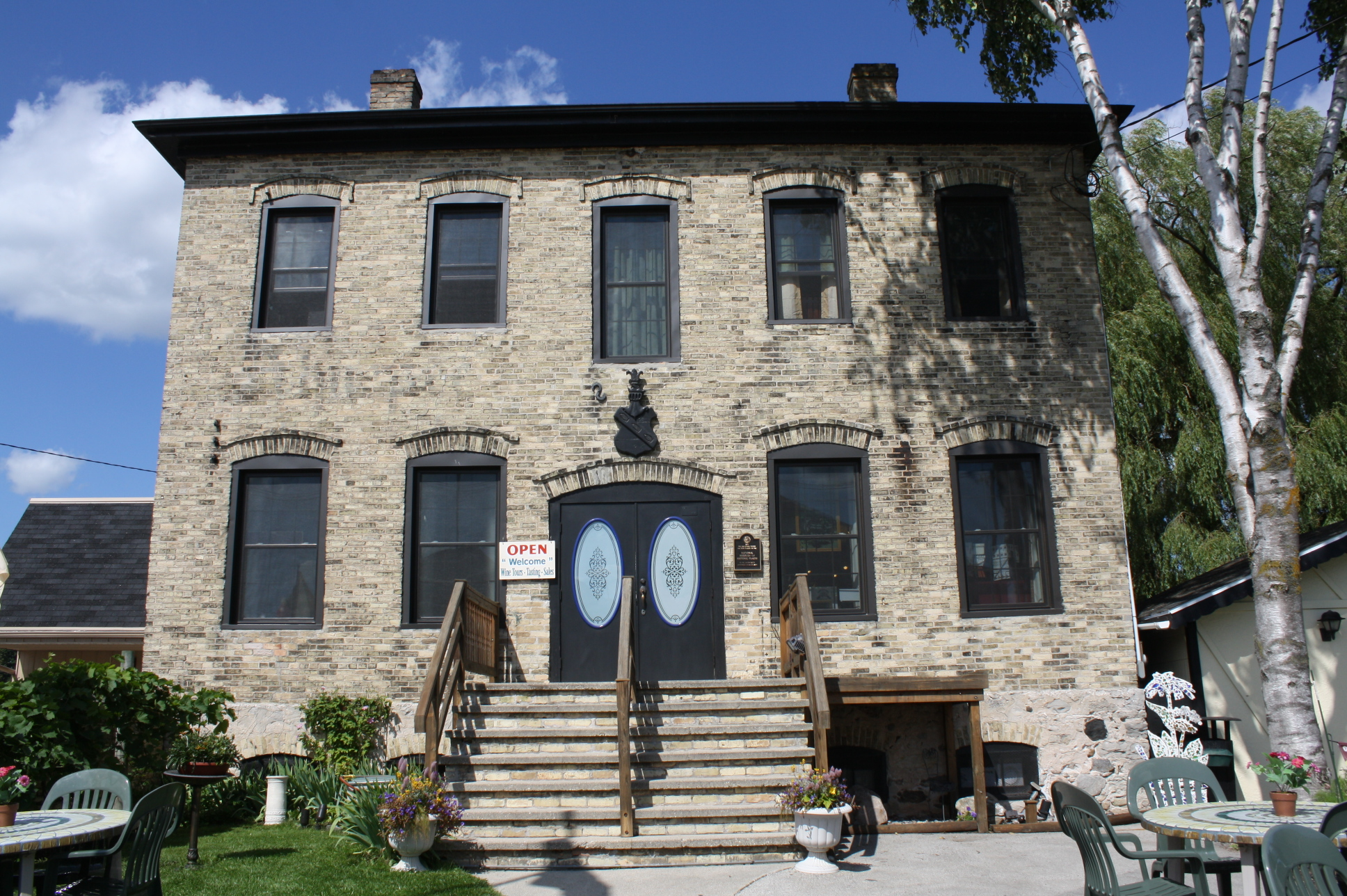
Ahnapee Brewery Algoma, Wisconsin

== Other beer companies ==
- Big Bay Brewing Company – Contract brewer formerly out of Milwaukee, now at House of Brews out of Madison.
- BluCreek Brewing Company – Madison – Founded in 2000 and originally targeted to a Japanese market. Produced by Sand Creek Brewing in Black River Falls.
- Fauerbach Brewing Company – Madison – Brand revived in 2005 and produced by Gray Brewing Company in Janesville.
- Horny Goat – Milwaukee – Founded in 2009. Brewpub and experimental brewing facilities in Milwaukee were open until 2015. Produced by Stevens Point Brewery.
- III Dachshunds Beer Company – Cudahy – Brewing since 2003. Available only on tap at City Lounge in Cudahy. Produced by Stone Cellar Brewery in Appleton.
- James Page Brewing Company - James Page Brewing was founded in 1986, and much of its beer was produced under contract, by other breweries. It is currently made by the Stevens Point Brewery.
- Lithia Beer – West Bend – Founded in 1898, merged into the West Bend Brewing Company in 1889. Brand revived in 2008 and is currently produced by Sprecher Brewing Company.
- Pangaea Beer Company – Neshkoro – Produced by Sand Creek Brewing in Black River Falls.

== Closed breweries ==
=== Milwaukee ===
- Pabst Brewing Company (1844–1996, 2017–2020)
- Joseph Schlitz Brewing Company (1849–1982)
- Valentin Blatz Brewing Company (1851–1959)
- Cream City Brewing Company (1853–1937)
- A. Gettelman Brewing Company (1856–1961)
- Independent Milwaukee Brewery (1901–1964)
- Milwaukee Brewing Company (1997–2022) – purchased and merged with Eagle Park Brewing & Distilling Company
- City Lights Brewing Co. – Milwaukee brewery that opened in January 2017 and closed in January 2025. It had a 30 barrel brewery, canning line, tap room, and beer garden located in Milwaukee's Menomonee Valley.

=== Others ===
- John Philips Brewery – Mineral Point (1835) (earliest known brewery in Wisconsin, then known as the Michigan Territory)
- Joseph Huber Brewing Company – Monroe (1845–1985)
- G. Heileman Brewing Company – La Crosse (1858–1996)
- Gambrinus Brewing Co. – Oshkosh (1864–1971)
- Rahr Brewery – Green Bay (1866–1966)
- Ashland Brewing Company – Ashland (1874–1937)
- George Walter Brewing Company – Appleton (1885–1972)
- Walter Brothers Brewing Company – Menasha (1888–1956)
- John Walter Brewing Company – Eau Claire (1893–1990)
- Hibernia Brewing – Eau Claire (1985–1988)
- Rockhound Brewing Company - Madison (2016–2020)
- Bull Falls Brewery - Wausau (2007–2024) – facility sold in 2025, and reopened as Bull Falls Brewing Company.

== See also ==
- Beer in Milwaukee
- Beer in the United States
- Barrel-aged beer
