= Beer in Milwaukee =

Beer culture in Milwaukee, Wisconsin

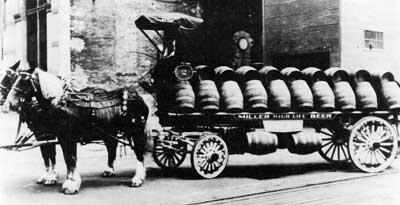
A brewery wagon for Miller brewery, Milwaukee, 1888. The wagon was manufactured by the Charles Abresch Company

The U.S. city of Milwaukee, Wisconsin has been associated with beer throughout its history. This heritage can be found in its Major League Baseball team, the Milwaukee Brewers, and on beer brands such as Old Milwaukee and Milwaukee's Best. The city's major brewers have included Miller, Pabst, and Schlitz. Miller Brewing Company is the city's largest brewery, producing 10 million barrels of beer a year.

== History ==
=== Early brewers ===
Milwaukee's first brewery opened in 1840 by Welsh settlers who named it Milwaukee Brewery. After a similar independent brewery was opened by a German immigrant, it was renamed Lake Brewery—although some accounts refer to the brewery as Owens Brewery after the brewery's primary owner. Other breweries established during this early period include Eagle Brewery, Empire Brewery, and Gipfel Union Brewery. Between 1840 and 1860, about 35 breweries were established in the Milwaukee area. The Milwaukee River was an important waterway for these early thriving businesses as well as ice that helped maintain proper temperatures for lager. By 1860, there were 30 breweries operating in the city of Milwaukee which had a population of 45,000 people.

=== Emergence of the Beer Barons ===
Milwaukee has been home to over 70 breweries and over 100 brewing companies throughout the course of its history. Of these, several major breweries grew during the 1850s. Many of those who ran these operations brought their knowledge from Germany where they learned the industrialized brewing process. Due to the turmoil wrought by the revolution taking place in Germany, several beer giants emigrated to the United States including Jacob Best, Valentin Blatz, Franz Falk, and August Krug. The Jacob Obermann Brewery, opened in 1854, was the largest brewery in the city for 20 years. By 1860, the largest producer of beer was the C.T. Melms Brewery. After the Great Chicago Fire of 1871 destroyed the Chicago brewing industry, Milwaukee was in prime position to emerge as a growing force nationally. By 1885, the major brewing industry in the city consolidated down to nine (Best, Blatz, Cream City, Falk, Gettelman, Jung & Borchert, Miller, Obermann, and Schlitz), although a smaller, tenth establishment, Gipfel Union Brewery, which opened in the early 1840s, remained in operation into the early 1890s.

==== Pabst Brewing Company ====
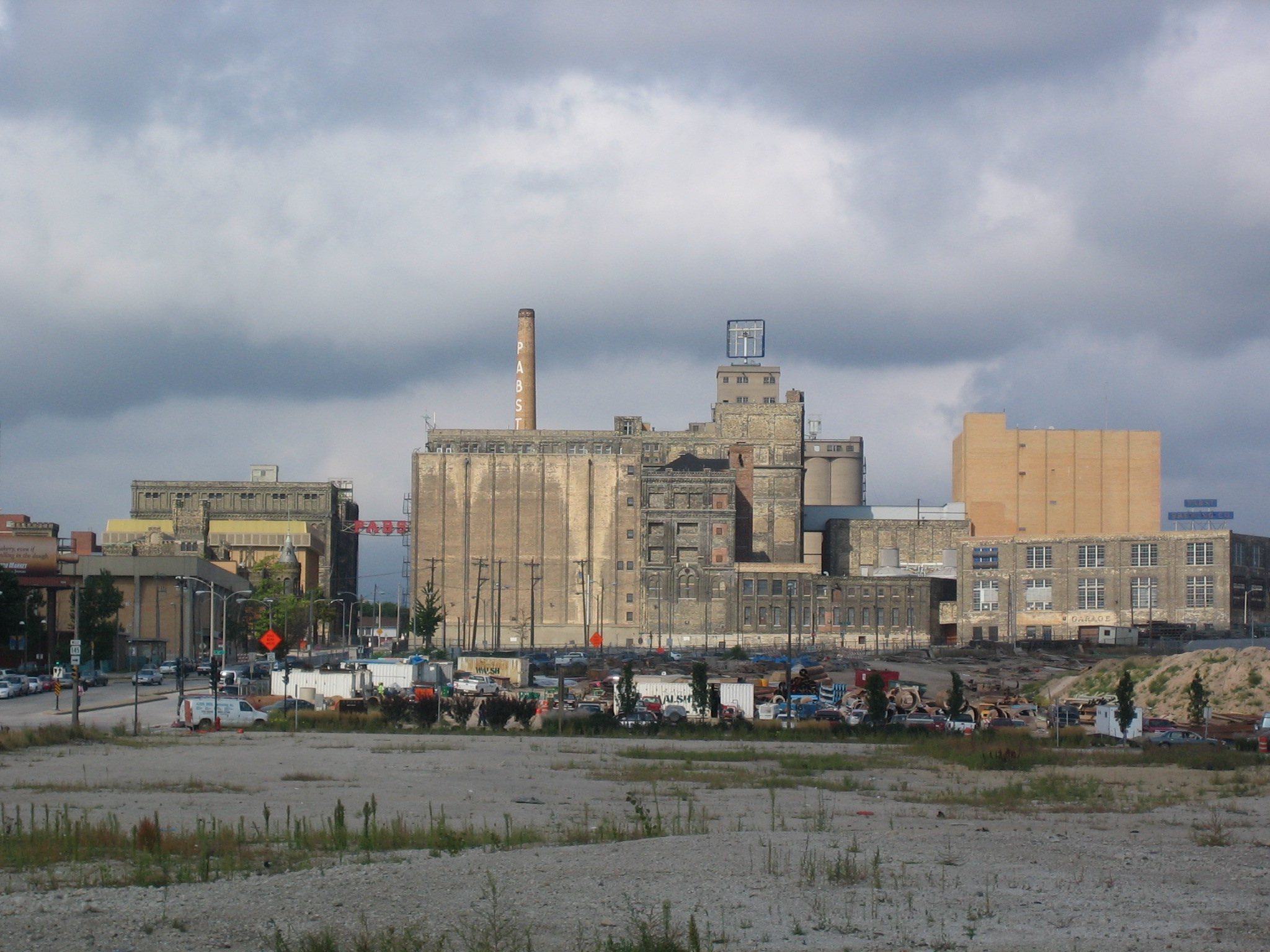
The former Pabst Brewery Complex in Milwaukee, Wisconsin closed in 1997

The first of the major Milwaukee brewing dynasties was founded by Jacob Best with Best and Company in 1844 along with his four sons Jacob Jr., Charles, Phillip, and Lorenz. The German immigrant family started with 300 barrels of beer in annual production. By 1859, Jacob's son Philip was the sole owner and he renamed the company (which by then was known as Empire Brewery) to Philip Best Brewing Company. By 1868, the company became the largest producer of beer in the city and remained in this position for the remainder of the 19th century. During this time period, the company was managed by Philip Best's sons-in-law Frederick Pabst and Emil Schandein. In 1869, the company purchased the then-third largest brewery in the city which had been owned by C. T. Melms. By 1874, the company was producing 100,000 barrels of beer annually and became the largest beer producer in the United States. The company's flagship brand Best's Select won awards in the 1870s (Gold Medals at Philadelphia's Centennial in 1876 and Paris' World's Fair in 1878). By 1882, the company started adding a blue ribbon to its beer brand at the beer competitions. After partner Emil Schandein's death in 1888, Frederick Pabst became sole owner of the company and renamed it Pabst Brewing Company in 1889. After winning another gold medal at the Chicago World's Columbian Exposition in 1893, Best's Select was renamed Pabst Blue Ribbon in 1898. During this time, the brewer was producing over 1 million barrels of beer annually, thanks in large part to the acquisition of the then fourth-largest brewer in the city, Falk, Jung, and Borchert Brewery in 1892, made Pabst the largest brewer of lager in the world.

==== Joseph Schlitz Brewing Company ====
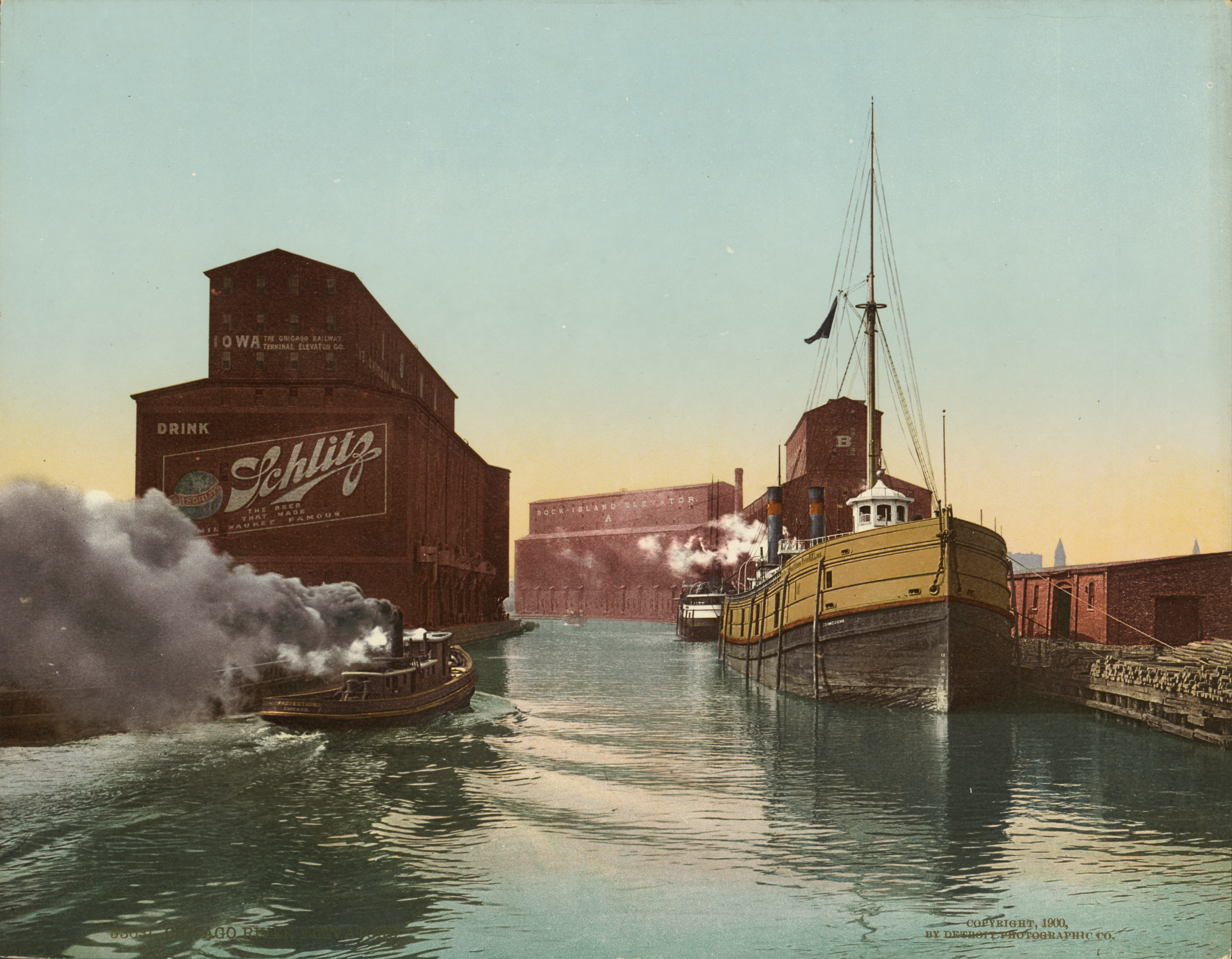
A 1900 advertisement for Schlitz beer, located along the South Branch of the Chicago River at 14th Street. Underneath the logo it states, "the beer that made Milwaukee famous".

In 1849, August Krug founded a brewery in the Milwaukee area. In its first year of operations it produced 150 barrels of beer. A year later he hired Joseph Schlitz as his bookkeeper. When Krug died unexpectedly at the end of 1856, Schlitz took over the managing operations of the business and married Krug's widow in 1858. During this early period the brewery had a capacity of 2,000 barrels. In 1861, the brewery was renamed Joseph Schlitz Brewing Company. During the civil war, demand rose for the company and business increased to 4,400 barrels annually. The Great Chicago Fire of 1871 furthered opportunity for demand for the brewer when the brewing industry in Chicago was wiped out. In 1873, the company expanded by purchasing the Pfiefer Brewery that was located within the city. During this time period, Schlitz was the second-leading brewer (5,430 barrels) in the city behind Pabst (9,763 barrels). By 1875, the company was producing 74,000 barrels of beer annually. While traveling to Germany, the ship Schlitz was traveling on sank and he was presumed dead. Schlitz's nephews, the Uihlein's, took over the operations thereafter. By 1878, the company produced 102,538 barrels of beer, or stated another way, over two million bottles of beer. By 1879, production for the company doubled. During this time period, beer was shipped by the company throughout the United States, Mexico, Central America, and Brazil. By 1886, the company was producing 500,000 barrels annually of which 1/6th was consumed locally. In 1893 the company introduced its successful advertising campaign "The Beer that Made Milwaukee Famous".

==== Valentin Blatz Brewing Company ====
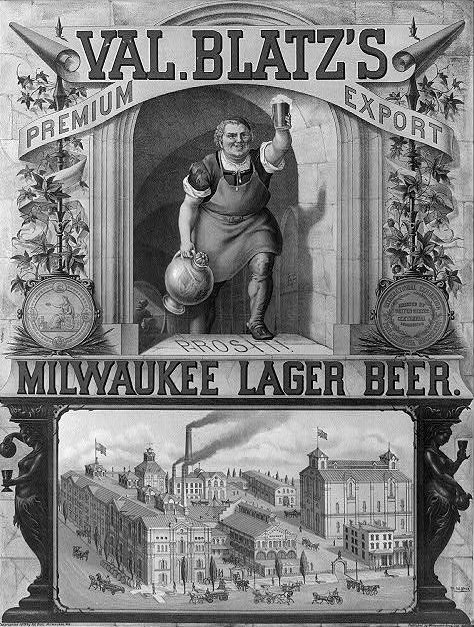
An 1879 advertisement for Val. Blatz's Milwaukee lager beer

Valentin Blatz opened his brewery in 1851 after having worked for John Braun of City Brewery (which had been in operation since 1846) for a couple years. Later that same year, after Braun died, he married his widow. In 1852 Blatz purchased Braun's brewery. He industrialized the brewery and by the 1860s was among the leading brewers in the city. In 1861, the company sold 8,000 barrels of beer. By 1867, Blatz was the largest producer of beer in the city. In 1871, they sold 34,000 barrels of beer. A fire destroyed the brewery in 1872, however Blatz rebuilt it with larger capacity and by 1875 sold 65,000 barrels of beer. Blatz was the first brewer to bottle its beer, and due to having several distribution centers throughout the United States, was probably the first brewer to have its bottled beer consumed by customers nationally. By the 1880s, the Blatz brewery produced 100,000 barrels of beer. In 1889, British investors attempted to purchase the breweries of Pabst, Schlitz, and Blatz. Although that takeover attempt failed, Blatz sold a significant portion of its business to the British investors in 1891, which called the company United States Brewing Company. Blatz remained with the company until his death in 1894. During this time, Blatz produced 365,000 of barrels of beer annually and was the third largest brewer (behind Pabst and Schlitz) in Milwaukee.

==== Falk Brewing Company ====
Frederick Goes and Franz Falk became partners in 1855 with the intent of becoming owners of a brewery. They purchased a malt house of the former Eagle Brewery and began operations in 1856 under the name Bavaria Brewery. Falk bought out Goes in 1866 and renamed the company Franz Falk and Company. During this time the company produced 5,468 barrels of beer. By 1874, Falk was the fourth-largest brewer in the city behind Pabst, Schlitz, and Blatz. In 1880, the company won awards in San Francisco and Australia. In 1881, the company incorporated under the name Franz Falk Brewing Corporation. By 1882 the company was one of the leading breweries in the United States. By 1886 the company was shipping their beer throughout the United States, East Indies, Sandwich Islands, Mexico, and South America. During this time the company was producing 25,000 barrels of beer annually. In 1889, the corporation merged with one of the major brewers in the city (Jung and Borchert) and formed the Falk, Jung and Borchert Brewery Corporation. This gave the new company a brewing capacity of 200,000 barrels of beer annually which was enough to compete with Blatz for third position within the hierarchy of brewers in the city. Unfortunately, there was a fire at the brewery during the summer of 1889. Despite the setback, the brewery was back up for operations within a few months. By 1890, the brewery was producing 200,000 barrels of beer annually. Disaster struck again in 1892 when another fire broke out at the brewery. This time the company opted to sell the company to the leading brewer in the city, Pabst. One of the former owners, Philipp Jung, purchased the Jacob Obermann Brewery in 1896.

==== Miller Brewing Company ====
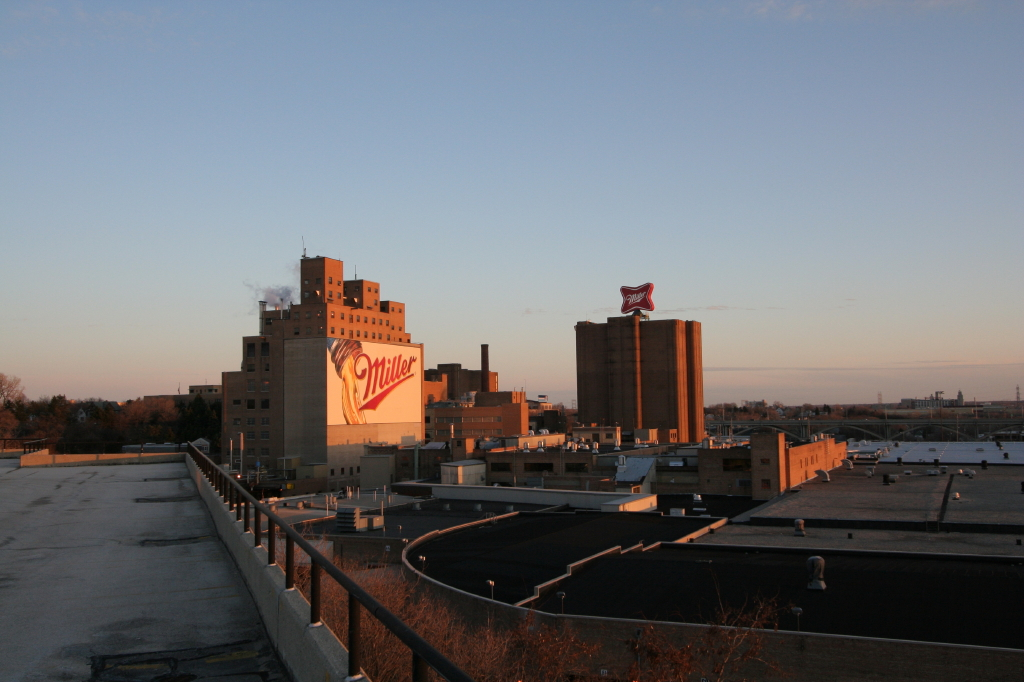
The Miller Brewery complex in Milwaukee

Frederick J. Miller's Plank Road Brewery was founded in 1855 after Frederick Miller purchased it from its previous owner Lorenz Best (the same person who helped co-found what would eventually become Pabst Brewing Company). At its inception, the brewery had a brewing capacity of 300 barrels of beer. Miller expanded his business to the nearby Chicago area during the 1850s and 1860s. As the company grew and expanded its operations, the company changed its name to Menomonee Valley Brewery in 1873. In 1886, the brewery began pasteurizing their product and grew to become the city's fifth largest. By 1887, it had become the fourth largest and by 1888 (when the named changed to Frederick Miller Brewing Company), the brewery had a capacity of 80,000 barrels of beer. The company continued to expand and update its operations throughout the 1890s.

==== A. Gettelman Brewing Company ====
Two men by the names of Strohn and Reitzenstein began building a brewery in the Milwaukee area around 1852. Unfortunately, due to a cholera outbreak, they both perished. Shortly thereafter, George Schweickhardt and his brother came from Buffalo, New York and completed construction of the site. The George Schweickhardt Menomonee Brewery was opened in 1856. In 1871, Schweickhardt added a partner by the name of Adam Gettelman. By 1876, Gettelman became sole owner of the company by buying out Schweickhardt's son-in-law Charles Schuckmann, who had bought his portion from the brewery's founder a few years prior. In 1877, the brewery suffered fire damage and caused a significant financial loss for the company as the insurance covered only about half of the loss due to the fire. The company was renamed A. Gettelman Brewing Company in 1887. The brewer kept its brewery relatively small so as to be able to manage the business for high quality product. The company established two flagship brands including "$1,000 Beer" in 1891 and Milwaukee's Best in 1895. The brewer became the smallest of the "big five" producers of beer in Milwaukee.

=== Beer Capital of the World ===
As the nineteenth century came to a close, Milwaukee was well known as a national leader in the production of beer. The city was famous for its beer production to the point that its two leading brewers used slogans referring to its Milwaukee heritage; Schlitz with "The Beer That Made Milwaukee Famous" and Pabst with "Milwaukee beer is famous: Pabst has made it so". By the end of the 19th century, Pabst's beer could be found in almost every major city in the United States. Several factors contributed to Milwaukee's brewing industry to become world renowned including its close proximity to Chicago in the wake of the Great Chicago Fire, and the aggressive business styles of the beer barons that emerged during those formative years leading up to its worldwide status. The rise of Milwaukee's brewing industry continued into the 20th century. In 1900, Schlitz Brewery began bottling its own beer. In 1901, Independent Milwaukee Brewery, a mid-level sized brewer, opened in the city. By 1903, Schlitz surpassed Pabst as the world's best-selling beer. That same year, Miller introduced their flagship brand High Life. In 1912, Schlitz started using brown bottles in its bottling process which was the first time a brewer had done so. During this time period, Milwaukee was home to four of the largest breweries in the world (Schlitz, Pabst, Blatz, Miller).

=== Prohibition ===
Much of the success of the Milwaukee breweries was not only their successful production and distribution of beer, but also the establishment of beer gardens and saloons. These establishments provided music, dancing, sports, and leisure and were found throughout the United States, but particularly so in Milwaukee. Unfortunately, due to these establishments, the Prohibition movement was designed to confront the disreputable saloons where prostitution and gambling were seen as major problems. Carrie Nation, a temperance movement leader, said "If there is any place that is hell on earth, it is Milwaukee." In 1917, the Food and Fuel Control Act shut down all distilleries and one year later a wartime prohibition amendment was passed by the United States Congress which effectively prevented the use of many products necessary in the production of beer. In 1919, the Eighteenth Amendment to the United States Constitution was ratified by the states and became effective one year later. Nearly all of Milwaukee's 1,980 saloons were closed. In 1920, United States Brewing Company sold Blatz Brewery to Edward Landsberg. Milwaukee's major breweries (Schlitz, Pabst, Blatz, Miller) and some mid-level breweries (Gettelman, Cream City, Independent) were able to survive this period by brewing soda and near beer, as well as manufacturing cheese products. Others (such as Philipp Jung Brewing Company) ceased operations.

=== Effect of repeal of 18th Amendment ===
In 1934, after the eighteenth amendment was repealed, Schlitz retained its position as the top beer producer in the world. During this time, the brewer introduced its Old Milwaukee brand. Pabst fell to third behind St. Louis-based Anheuser-Busch Brewing Association. By the mid-1930s there were nine breweries operating in the city. The output from these breweries exceeded the pre-prohibition output value by 10 percent. During these years, Schlitz and Pabst began expanding their operations nationally by purchasing production facilities in other cities within the United States. In 1937, long-time mid-sized Milwaukee brewer Cream City Brewing Company went out of business. In 1947, Blatz was the ninth largest brewer in the United States. In 1948, Schlitz was producing 4 million barrels of beer annually, more than any brewer in the world. By 1950, Schlitz shipped more than five million barrels of beer and Pabst 3.4 million barrels of beer. In 1950, Schlitz was the number one brewer in the country with Pabst fourth, Miller eighth, and Blatz ninth. In 1952, Schlitz set a world record by producing 6.35 million barrels of beer in a single year which was more than the combined output from its first 44 years of existence. In 1953, the six breweries in the city (Schlitz, Pabst, Miller, Blatz, Gettelman, Independent) went on strike for 76 days. Due to the worker's strike at Schlitz, Anheuser-Busch over took Schlitz as the top brewing company in 1953. Although Schlitz re-took the top spot again from 1955 through 1956, they lost it again in 1957 and never regained it.

=== Consolidation ===
By the end of the 1950s Blatz declined nationally to a ranking of eighteenth as they were not able to compete nationally with other major brewers' expansion activities. Pabst, in an effort to compete with industry leaders Anheuser-Busch and Schlitz, purchased Blatz in 1958. Pabst closed the former Blatz Milwaukee brewery in 1959 but retained its brands. The purchase of Blatz catapulted Pabst back to the third-largest brewer in 1961 after having fallen outside the top five. Also in 1961, A. Gettelman Brewing Company sold to Miller Brewing Company. In 1962, Independent Milwaukee Brewery produced 133,000 barrels of beer. However, the brewer ceased operations after 63 years of business in 1964. In 1967, Schlitz changed its brewing process to accelerate fermentation which was not well received by the public due to perceived reduction in quality. In 1969, Pabst sold its investment in Blatz to G. Heileman Brewing Company after the federal government sued the company due to anti-trust issues. In 1970, Miller was purchased by Philip Morris. In 1972, Miller purchased Lite brand from Meister Brau Brewing of Chicago, then re-branded it as Lite Beer from Miller. In 1976, Schlitz suffered another blow to its image when its Memphis and Tampa plants made "flaky" or "hazy" beer due to production problems. By 1977, Miller Brewing Company jumped from the seventh-leading national brewer to number two behind Anheuser-Busch in a matter of eight years. By 1980, Milwaukee boasted the second (Miller), third (Pabst), and fourth (Schlitz) largest brewing companies in the United States and had the largest brewing capacity in the world. In 1981, the workers at Schlitz went on strike. When an agreement could not be reached, the brewer closed its Milwaukee plant. Pabst and Heileman both made bids to purchase beleaguered Schlitz, but ultimately sold to Stroh Brewing Company in 1982.

=== Craft brew era ===
In 1985, Randal Sprecher, former supervisor at Pabst Brewing Company, opened the first brewery in Milwaukee since the end of prohibition. In its first year of production, Sprecher Brewing Company made less than 1,000 barrels of beer. The company has since become a leader in Milwaukee's craft beer industry. That same year, Pabst sold to venture capitalist Paul Kalmanovitz. In 1986, Heileman built a brewery in the Milwaukee area so that Blatz beer production could resume in the city for the first time in seventeen years. In 1987, Lakefront Brewery opened a craft beer operation in Milwaukee. Heileman sold the Blatz plant to Miller after failed sales expectations, which went on to use the plant for its Leinenkugel beer production in 1995. In 1996, Pabst closed its Milwaukee brewery and moved its headquarters to Chicago. In 1997, Milwaukee Brewing Company began operations in Milwaukee. In 1998, Miller contracted with Pabst to begin brewing brands held by Pabst. In 1999, Pabst acquired Stroh Brewing Company which eventually brought famous Milwaukee brands Schlitz and Old Milwaukee back into Milwaukee production. In 2002, Miller sold to SABMiller. When Anheuser-Busch was combined with InBev in 2008 as Anheuser-Busch InBev, Pabst Brewing Company became the largest United States owned brewing company in the nation. In 2016, Molson Coors Brewing Company purchased the Miller portfolio and created MillerCoors. Miller has the city's largest brewery and produces ten million barrels of beer annually. In 2017, Pabst opened a brewery in Milwaukee for the first time since closing their plant in 1996, although the new brewery would produce a fraction (4,000 barrels a year) of its previous plant's output. Lakefront Brewery production reached 46,000 barrels of beer by 2017. Since 2015, nearly two dozen craft brewing companies have been established in Milwaukee. In 2020, Molson Coors changed the name of their Milwaukee operations from MillerCoors to Molson Coors Beverage Company. In late December 2020, Pabst closed its operations in Milwaukee after only three years re-establishing itself in the city. In 2022, Eagle Park Brewing acquired the beer brands of the 3rd oldest craft brewer in the city, Milwaukee Brewing Company, which is anticipated to increase their production to 14,000 barrels. Milwaukee Brewing Company's brewery was purchased by Pilot Project Brewing.

=== Contraction of brewing operations ===
In 2024, Milwaukee saw a number of brewing operations cease operations. The Jacob Leinenkugel Brewing Company announced it would close its 10th Street brewery in Milwaukee. The production (along with the production of the Chippewa Falls location), would move to the main Molson-Coors brewery within the city. Furthermore, three craft brewers with production over several years (Company Brewing, Enlightened Brewing, and Mobcraft Brewing) announced they would cease operations. These closures left the city with 24 craft brewers remaining within the city limits.

== Brands ==
=== Molson Coors Beverage Company ===
Produced at Miller Brewery

- Miller Lite
- Miller High Life
- Miller Genuine Draft
- Miller64
- Coors Light
- Blue Moon seasonal brews
- Redd's Apple Ale

Produced at Leinenkugel 10th Street Brewery

- Leinenkugel's Shandy varieties

=== Sprecher Brewing Company ===
Produced at Sprecher Brewery

- Sprecher Special Amber
- Sprecher Black Bavarian
- Sprecher Heff Weiss
- Sprecher Abbey Triple
- Sprecher India Pale Ale

=== Lakefront Brewing Company ===
Produced at Lakefront Brewery

- Fixed Gear
- IPA
- Hazy Rabbit
- Clean Machine
- Riverwest Stein
- East Side Dark
- Lakefront Pils
- Lakefront Lager

=== Milwaukee Brewing Company ===
Produced at Eagle Park Brewing Company

- Louie's Demise - Amber Ale
- MKE IPA
- O-Gii - Tea Infused Wit Beer
- Outboard - Cream Ale
- Punch Bowl - Sour
- Weekend At Louie's - Amber Ale
- Recombobulation - Barrel Aged Cuve
- MKE Day IPA
- Recombobulation - Bourbon Barrel Aged Cuve
- Louie's Resurrection - Bourbon Barrel Aged Amber Ale
- Louie's Cherry Bounce - Bourbon Barrel Aged Amber Ale

=== Eagle Park Brewing Company ===
Produced at Eagle Park Brewing Company

- Set List - Hazy IPA
- Rectifier - West Coast IPA
- Blues Breaker - Wheat Beer
- Loop Station - Lime Golden Ale
- Spekto Kooler - Hard Seltzer
- M.C. Hammerschlagen - Oktoberfest

== List of brewers ==
=== Current brewers ===
- Miller Brewing Company (1855– )
- Sprecher Brewing Company (1985– )
- Lakefront Brewery (1987– )
- Water Street Brewery (1987– )
- Jacob Leinenkugel Brewing Company (1995– )
- Big Head Brewing Company (2013– )
- Bavarian Bierhaus (2016– )
- Black Husky Brewing (2016– )
- Third Space Brewing (2016– )
- Urban Harvest Brewing (2016– )
- Broken Bat Brewing Company (2017– )
- Eagle Park Brewing (2017– )
- Explorium Brewpub (2017– )
- Gathering Place Brewing (2017– )
- Component Brewing (2018– )
- Stock House Brewing Company (2018– )
- Vennture Brew Company (2018– )
- Indeed Brewing (2019– )
- Dead Bird Brewing (2019– )
- Supermoon Beer Co. (2020– )
- Wizard Works Brewing (2020– )
- New Barons Brewing Cooperative (2020– )
- Amorphic Beer (2021- )
- Ope! Brewing Company (2022– )
- Pilot Project Brewing (2022– )
- MobCraft Beer (2016–2024,2025–)

=== Former brewers ===
- Owens Lake Brewery (1840–1864)
- Stolz & Krell Brewery (1840–1848)
- Eagle Brewery (1841–1861)
- J.B. Maier Lake Brewery (1841–1844)
- Conrad Muntzingberger Brewery (1842–1847)
- Gipfel Union Brewery (1843–1893)
- Pabst Brewing Company (1844–1996, 2017–2020)
- Francis Neukirch Lake Brewery (1844–1848)
- City Brewery (1846–1851)
- Stoltz Union Brewery (1848–1874)
- Neukirch & Melms Brewery (1848–1853)
- Joseph Schlitz Brewing Company (1849–1982)
- Wisconsin Brewery (1850–1878)
- Plank Road Brewery (1850–1855)
- William L. Hopkins and Company Brewery (1850–1855)
- Valentin Blatz Brewing Company (1851–1959)
- Phoenix Brewery (1852–1868; 1871–1881)
- Cream City Brewing Company (1853–1937)
- C.T. Melms Brewery (1853–1869)
- Jacob Obermann Brewery (1854–1895)
- A. Gettelman Brewing Company (1856–1961)
- Falk Brewing Company (1856–1892)
- Northwestern Brewery (1856–1884)
- Otto Zwietusch Brewing Company (1858–1864)
- Prairie Street Brewery (1858–1863)
- Jacob Ziegler Brewery (1858–1860)
- John Ennes Brewery (1860–1879)
- Western Brewery (1860–1875)
- Carl Knoblauch Brewery (1860–1868)
- Simon J. Meister Brewery (1860–1868)
- Weiss and Syphon Beer Brewery (1860–1868)
- Sand's Spring Brewery (1861–1867)
- Ludwig Mesow Brewery (1861–1863)
- Peter Gerstner Brewery (1861–1863)
- Frederick Schwarz Brewery (1862–1864)
- John M. Davis and Company Brewery (1863–1866)
- M.W. Powell and Company Brewery (1864–1880)
- John Berg Brewery (1865–1881)
- Pfiefer Brewery (1866–1873)
- Lemon Beer Brewery (1873–1879)
- F. Borchert and Son Brewing Company (1874–1879)
- Milwaukee Brewing Association (1875–1881)
- E.L. Husting Weiss Beer Brewery (1877–1920)
- South Side White Beer Brewery (1877–1884)
- Charles Goerke Brewery (1878–1888)
- Grisbaum & Kehrein Brewery (1879–1890)
- Jung & Borchert Brewing Company (1879–1888)
- Louis Werrbach Brewing Company (1880–1881; 1886–1909)
- John Graf Brewery (1883–1920)
- C.H. Munzinger Brewery (1890–1901)
- Milwaukee Brewery Company (1893–1920)
- John Kohl Brewery (1893–1900)
- Philipp Jung Brewing Company (1896–1920)
- Gustav A. Obermann Brewing and Bottling Company (1897–1900)
- Roedel Brewing Company (1897–1899)
- Badger Brewing Company (1899–1901)
- Independent Milwaukee Brewery (1901–1964)
- Ben Kornburger and Brothers Brewery (1901–1920)
- George Zeiger Brewery (1901–1907)
- Mutual Brewing Company (1913–1916)
- Capital Brewing Company (1933–1948)
- Fischbach Brewing Company (1933–1936)
- Banner Brewing Company (1933–1935)
- Old Lager Brewing Company (1934–1938)
- G. Heileman Brewing Company (1986–1995)
- Milwaukee Brewing Company (1997–2022)
- Stout Brothers Public House (2000–2003)
- Onopa/Stonefly Brewing Company (2001–2014)
- St. Francis Brewing Company (2009–2019)
- Horny Goat Brewing Company (2009–2015)
- Big Bay Brewing Company (2010–2014)
- Brenner Brewing Company (2013–2017)
- District 14 Brewery and Pub (2014–2018)
- Like Minds Brewing (2016–2018)
- Rock Bottom Restaurant and Brewery (1997–2023)
- Westallion Brewing Company (2017–2023)
- Fermentorium Barrel House. (2019–2023)
- Company Brewing (2014–2024)
- Enlightened Brewing Company (2013–2024)
- City Lights Brewing Company (2017–2025)
- Good City Brewing Company (2016–2025)
- 1840 Brewing Company (2017–2025)

== See also ==
- List of breweries in the United States
- List of breweries in Wisconsin
- List of microbreweries
