= Independent Milwaukee Brewery =

The Independent Milwaukee Brewery was an American brewery that was located on the south side of Milwaukee, Wisconsin from 1901 until 1964, when it was closed by G. Heileman Brewing Company which purchased the brewery in 1962. The brewery's signature brand was Braumeister. The trademark for this brand is currently held by Rhinelander Brewing Company.

== History ==
The company was founded by five partners: Henry N. Bills, William Gutknecht, Charles Evers, Emil Czarnecki, and William Jung. During Prohibition, Bills bought out the other partners and brought on his sons and son-in-law into the business. The company survived Prohibition by selling near beer. After Prohibition, the brewer was the first to obtain a beer manufacturing permit from the city to resume beer production. In 1953, the brewery's workers went on strike at the same time as the other five major brewers in the city (Schlitz, Pabst, Miller, Blatz, and Gettelman) in the 1953 Milwaukee brewery strike. In 1962, the company sold to Lacrosse, Wisconsin-based G. Heileman Brewing Company and produced 133,000 barrels of beer. In 1963, the company laid off workers until their staff was reduced to fifty employees. In 1964 the brewery was closed.

== Brands ==
- Biermann Beer (1962-1964)
- Bill's Culmbacher Beer (1933-1950)
- Bill's High Power Bock Beer (1933-1950)
- Bill's High Power Pilsener Style Beer (1933-1964)
- Bill's Lager Beer (1933-1950)
- Braumeister Bock Beer (1933-1950)
- Braumeister Dortmunder Dark Beer (1950-1959)
- Braumeister Holiday Beer (1934-1955)
- Braumeister Lager Beer (1933-1950)
- Braumeister Select Beer (1936-1940)
- Deutscher Club Lager Beer (1933-1950)
- Eisen Stark Beer (1958-1960)
- Independent Bock Beer (1933-1936)
- Independent Select Beer (1933-1936)
- Little Brau Beer (1933-1950)
- Log Cabin Beer (1942-1957)
- Special Pilsner Beer (1933-1936)

== See also ==
- Beer in Milwaukee
- List of defunct breweries in the United States
