= Bernie Brewer =

Mascot of the Milwaukee Brewers

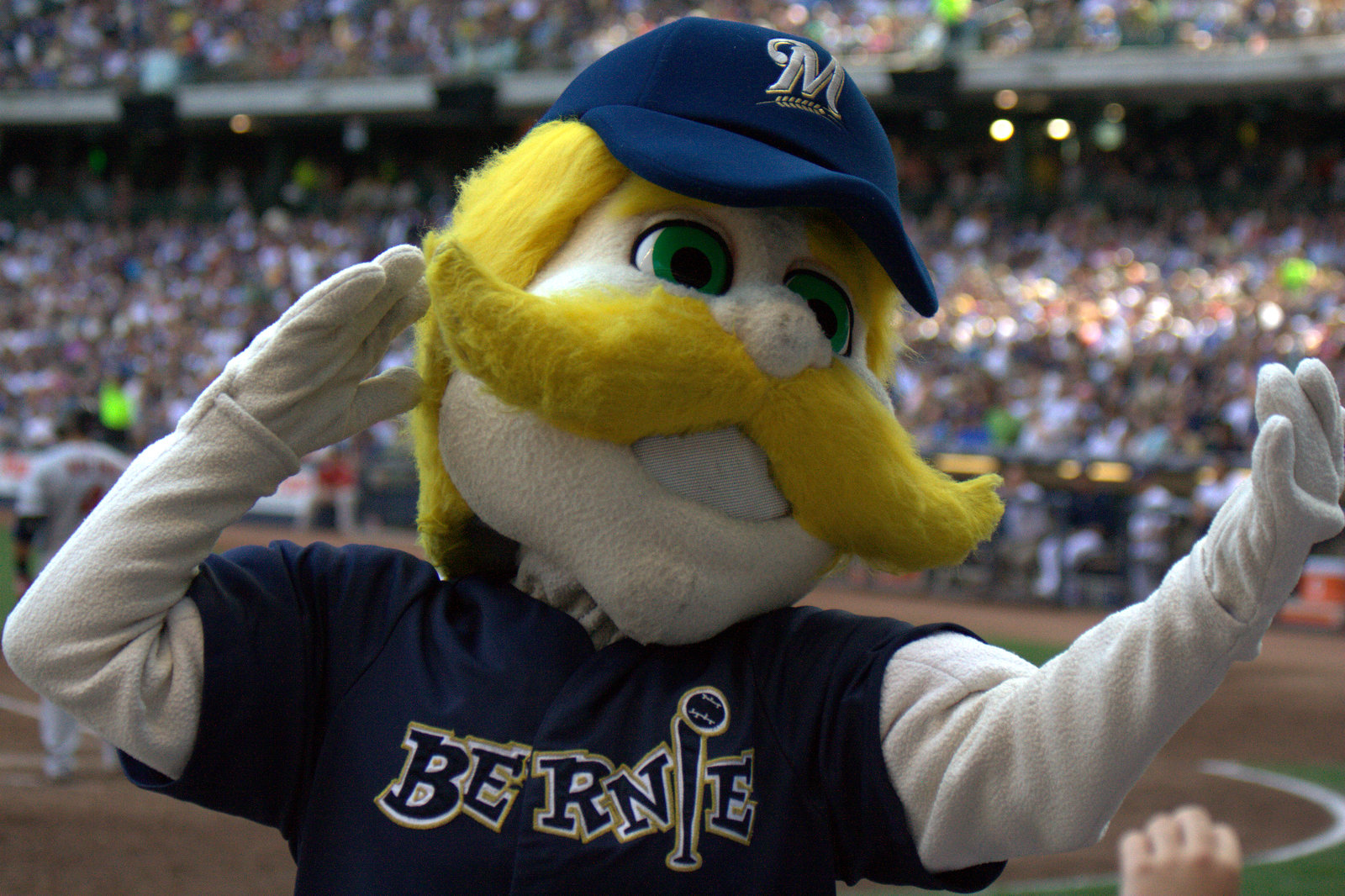
- Bernie Brewer embedded in crowd, encouraging fans to make noise
- Team: Milwaukee Brewers
- First seen: 1973
- Website: Official Website

Bernie Brewer is the official mascot for the Milwaukee Brewers baseball team.

== History ==
In late June 1970, when the Brewers were still a new team and having difficulty drawing spectators to their games at Milwaukee County Stadium, Milt Mason, a 69-year-old Brewers fan, decided to sit atop the scoreboard until the team could draw a home crowd of 40,000. He remained there for about 40 days. To the delight of a Bat Day crowd of 44,387 on August 16, Mason descended from his trailer following the Brewers' 4–3 win over the Indians. He slid down a rope from his perch, sustaining burns to his hands and legs. After a long illness, Mason died on June 12, 1973, but not before being recognized as the original Bernie Brewer.

The Bernie Brewer character became the team's mascot in 1973, as a tribute to Mason, appearing as a cheerful man with a big mustache. In 1973, a beer-barreled chalet was built for him inside the stadium where he led the crowd in cheering. The new chalet and beer mug made their debut at the home opener that season on April 14, 1973. The original date for the opener had been snowed out. Thereafter, following each home run and every victory by the Brewers, he slid down and plunged himself into a huge beer mug in celebration, balloons rising into the air from the mug. He was joined by a companion Bonnie Brewer, who playfully swatted at the backside of the opposing team's third base coach with a broom as the field crew swept the base paths.

Bernie Brewer was a fixture at Brewers home games until 1984, when the Brewers re-built the bleachers, replacing the chalet with a sound tower and sending Bernie into retirement. By popular demand, Bernie Brewer came out of retirement in 1993, when the fans voted for his return. Bernie was brought back not as just a mustachioed man in lederhosen, but in a full-body costume of a man, including large foam head. The chalet was then rebuilt (it had been in storage on the third base side under the box seats) above the left-center field bleachers. The original chalet has found a home at Lakefront Brewery, a local Milwaukee brewery and may be viewed during their brewery tour.

== Present ==
At American Family Field, the current home of the Milwaukee Brewers, Bernie Brewer has his own "dugout" atop the bleachers behind left field, where he continues to lead the cheering at every home game. Currently he slides down a plastic white slide, no longer into a giant mug of beer but onto a platform in the shape of home plate when a Brewer hits a home run, while a sign tower with Bob Uecker's trademark home run call ("Get up, get up, get outta here, GONE!!") lights up above the Dugout. In 2009, Kalahari Resorts bought the rights to the bottom platform, and renamed it The Kalahari Splash Zone.

== Gallery ==
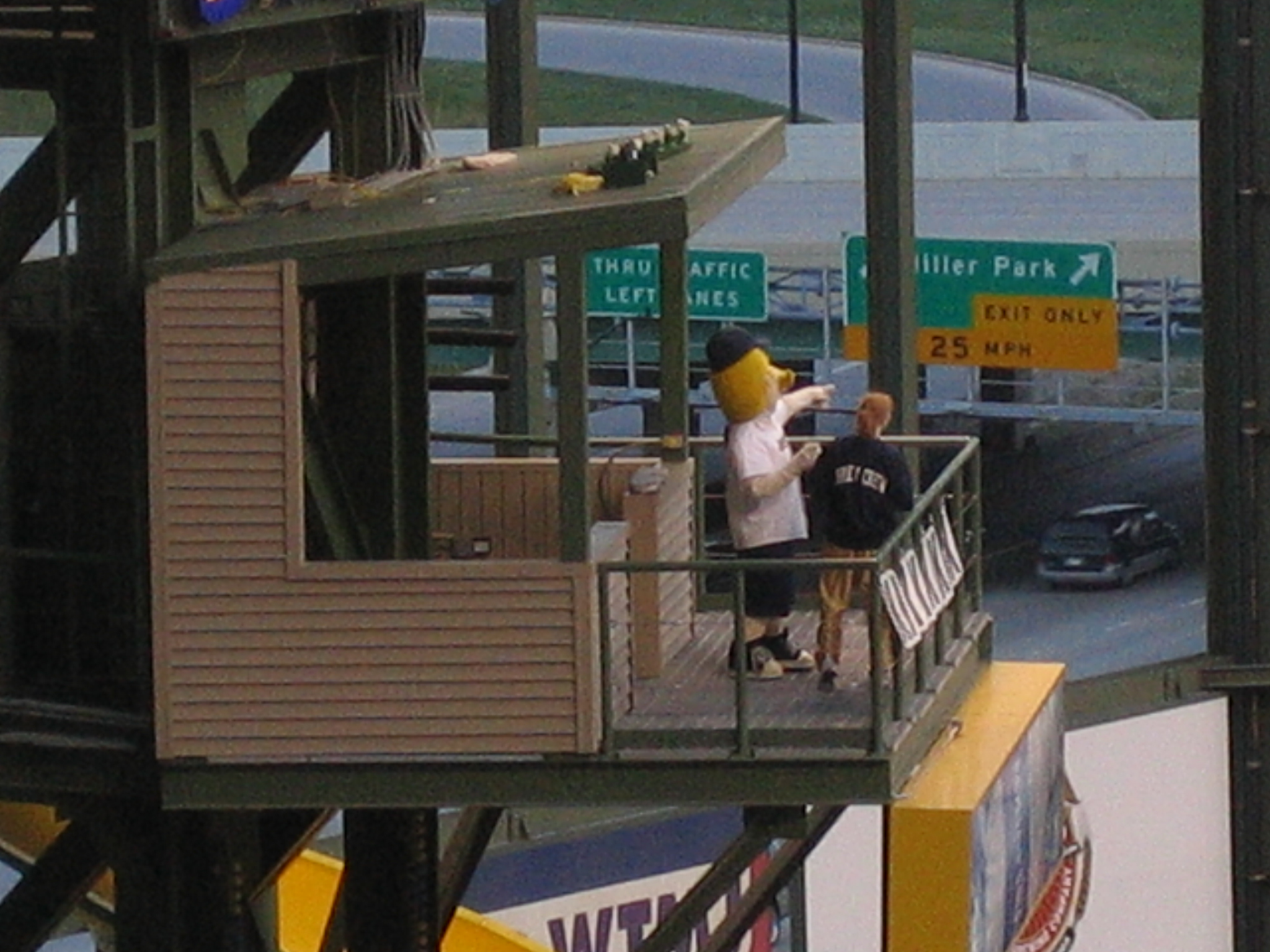
Bernie Brewer (left) in his dugout at American Family Field.

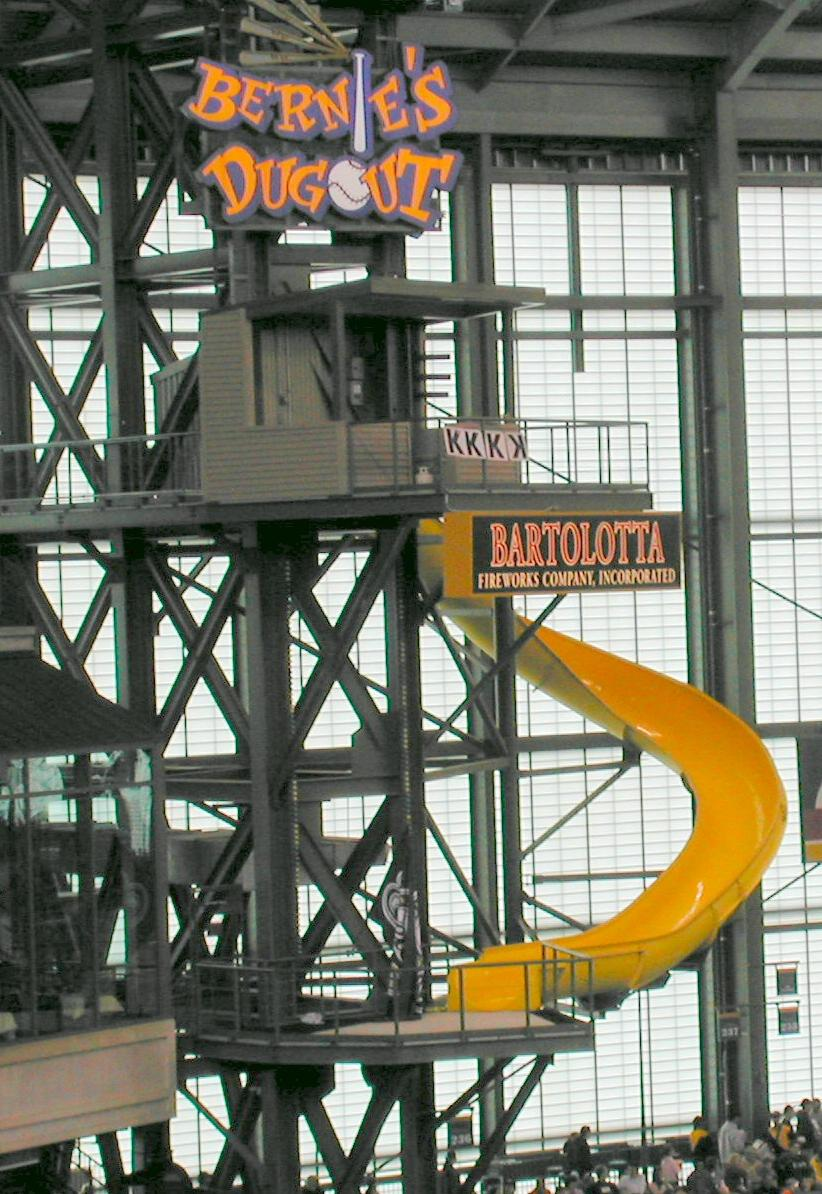
Bernie Brewer's dugout and slide.

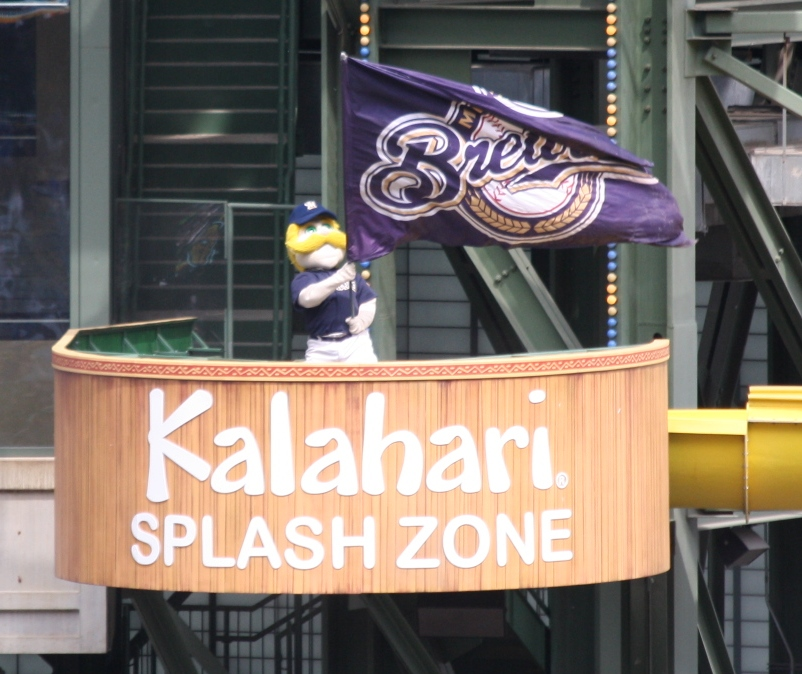
Waving flag after a player hit a home run

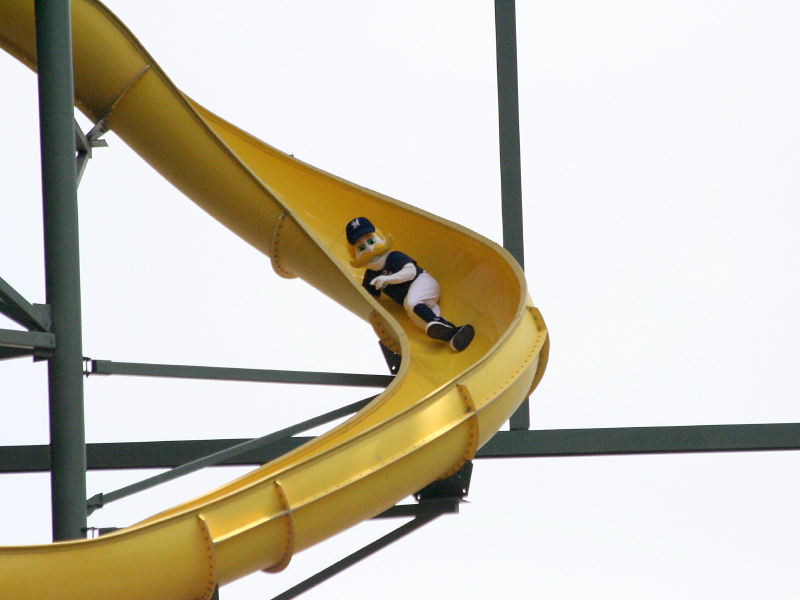
After a home run, Bernie Brewer takes the slide down from his tree house in the outfield.
