= 1953 Milwaukee brewery strike =

Labor dispute in Wisconsin, United States

- Date: May 14 – July 29, 1953 (2 months, 2 weeks and 1 day)
- Location: Milwaukee, Wisconsin, United States
- Goals: Increased wages; Reduced hours; Improvements to health and pension plans; Additional holidays
- Methods: Walkout; Strike action
- Result: New labor contracts favorable to the union

Parties
Brewery Workers Local 9	A. Gettelman Brewing Company; Independent Milwaukee Brewery; Joseph Schlitz Brewing Company; Miller Brewing Company; Pabst Brewing Company; Valentin Blatz Brewing Company

The 1953 Milwaukee brewery strike was a strike action involving approximately 7,100 workers at six breweries in Milwaukee, Wisconsin, United States. The strike began on May 14 of that year after the Brewery Workers Union Local 9 and an employers' organization representing six Milwaukee-based brewing companies failed to agree to new labor contracts. These contracts would have increased the workers' wages and decreased their working hours, making them more comparable to the labor contracts of brewery workers elsewhere in the country. The strike ended in late July, after the Valentin Blatz Brewing Company (one of the smaller companies in the organization) broke with the other breweries and began negotiating with the union. The other companies soon followed suit and the strike officially ended on July 29, with union members voting to accept new contracts that addressed many of their initial concerns.

== Background ==
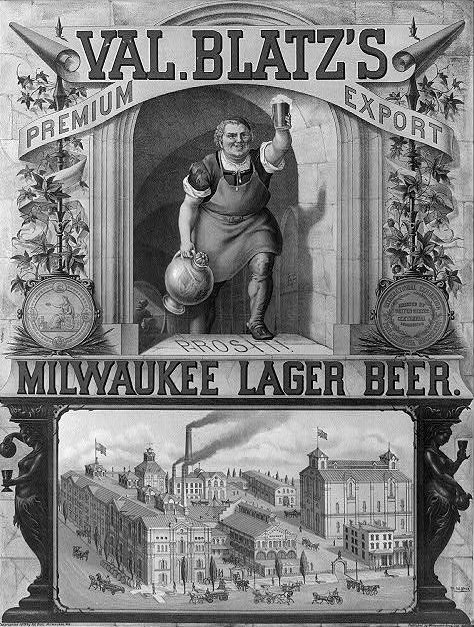
Advertisement for the Valentin Blatz Brewing Company, a Milwaukee-based brewery involved in the strike

The city of Milwaukee has a long history pertaining to the brewing industry and has been the home for numerous major breweries. In the early 1950s, the Milwaukee-based Joseph Schlitz Brewing Company was the largest brewer in the world and in 1952 it set a world record by churning out 6.35 million barrels of beer in one year. Several years prior, in 1946, the Brewery Workers (the national labor union representing brewery workers) became affiliated with the Congress of Industrial Organizations (CIO). The Local union representing workers in Milwaukee, Local 9, traced its history back to the late 1800s and was one of the most powerful unions in Wisconsin. On May 1, 1953, the labor contract between Local 9 members and Milwaukee brewers (represented by a joint bargaining committee) was set to expire. Subsequently, Local 9 representatives submitted a new proposed contract, with items in the proposal included a $0.25 per hour wage increase, a reduction in working hours from 40 to 35 per week, additional holidays, and improvements to pension and health plans. These provisions were designed to put Milwaukee brewery workers on equal pay and hours as workers on the West Coast and East Coast of the United States. Additionally, the union wanted to raise the weekly salary for workers in the bottling and brewing departments from $80 and $82, respectively, to $90.75. At the time, the base hourly pay for Milwaukee brewery workers was $2. John Schmitt, the local's recording secretary, stated that the reduced number of hours was due to increased productivity from advancements in machinery, with a Chicago Daily Tribune article at the time reporting him as saying "there are not 12 months of work for our people any more." Finally, on May 14, 1953, (Note: One source gives the start date for the strike as May 15.) after months of discussions that resulted in no agreement between the union and companies, approximately 7,100 members of Local 9 from 6 breweries performed a walkout, beginning a labor strike against the breweries. According to a later report by the Milwaukee Journal Sentinel, the union members had "voted overwhelmingly" to strike.

The strike affected six brewing companies in Milwaukee: Schlitz, A. Gettelman Brewing Company, Independent Milwaukee Brewery, Miller Brewing Company, Pabst Brewing Company, and the Valentin Blatz Brewing Company.

== Course of the strike ==
While the strike shut down brewing throughout the city, many bars and other drinking establishments in Milwaukee had a stockpile of beer, avoiding a potential shortage early on. On June 1, despite making no concessions to Milwaukee employees regarding working hours, Schlitz offered workers at a brewery in Brooklyn a reduction in weekly hours from 37.5 to 35 and a pay increase of $0.66 per hour more than the base pay rate in Milwaukee. This action increased solidarity among the Milwaukee strikers. As the strike continued into June, drinking establishments in Milwaukee began importing beer from different breweries brewed in places outside of Milwaukee, such as Peru, Indiana. On June 26, Local 9 members voted 6,274 to 348 to reject a $0.15 hourly wage increase that had been offered by the breweries. At the time, the brewing companies were beginning to hurt financially due to the strike. While Pabst and Schlitz had breweries in other locations, the other companies only operated breweries in Milwaukee, causing them to be more greatly affected by the strike.

In late July, Blatz, whose only breweries were in Milwaukee, broke with the other brewing companies and began to negotiate directly with Local 9 regarding a contract. Following this, the other companies followed suit and began to negotiate. With Blatz having already secured an agreement with the union, the other companies were forced to accept the terms of the Blatz agreement, which included an hourly wage increase, (Note: Sources vary on the size of the increase. A 1953 article in The New York Times claims the workers received a $0.20 hourly wage increase, while a 1984 book published by the State Historical Society of Wisconsin gives the increase as $0.63.) two additional holidays, improvements to the life insurance and pension plans, and a 30 minute paid lunch, among other things. In total, the strike lasted 76 days, ending on July 29. (Note: Sources vary somewhat on the exact length of the strike, with an earlier article in The New York Times titled "Milwaukee Brewery Strike Ends" dated July 27. Other sources claim the strike lasted for 10 weeks, 11 weeks, and "nearly eight weeks". The end date used here is the one reported by the Associated Press as being the day union members voted to accept new labor contracts.) On that day, union members voted approximately 3 to 1 to accept new labor contracts with the 6 brewing companies.

== Aftermath ==
Following the strike, Blatz was removed from the association representing the Milwaukee brewers for their "unethical" actions during the strike. At the 1953 Schlitz company Christmas party, Schlitz president Erwin C. Uihlein said the following regarding the strike:

Irreparable harm was done to the Milwaukee brewing industry during the 76-day strike of 1953, and unemployed brewery workers must endure "continued suffering" before the prestige of Milwaukee beer is re-established on the world market.

The strike contributed to Schlitz's rival Anheuser-Busch (based in St. Louis) overtaking them in 1953 as the country's largest brewing company. Both Anheuser-Busch and Schlitz competed for the top spot throughout the 1950s, and Schlitz had held it in the two years prior to the strike. However, in the years following the strike, Schlitz would rebound and continue to grow, acquiring numerous smaller brewing companies during the 1960s. They again held the top spot between 1955 and 1956.

== See also ==
- 1981 Schlitz strike

== Bibliography ==
- "May 14". CWA District 4. May 14, 2016. Archived from the original on May 13, 2021.
- Foran, Chris (May 1, 2017). "10 moments in Milwaukee's past – May". Milwaukee Journal Sentinel. Gannett. Archived from the original on June 1, 2021.
- "Today's Labor History". Metro Washington Council AFL–CIO. May 14, 2021. Archived from the original on May 14, 2021.
- Mittelman, Amy (2008). Brewing Battles: A History of American Beer. New York City: Algora Publishing. ISBN 978-0-87586-574-4 – via Google Books.
- Ozanne, Robert W. (1984). The Labor Movement in Wisconsin: A History. Madison, Wisconsin: State Historical Society of Wisconsin. ISBN 978-0-87020-571-2 – via Google Books.
- Prosten, David (May 10, 2021). "This week in labor history: May 10-16". The Labor Tribune. Archived from the original on June 1, 2021.
- Skilnik, Robert F. (2003). "Schlitz, Joseph, Brewing Company". In Blocker Jr., Jack S.; Fahey, David M.; Tyrrell, Ian R. (eds.). Alcohol and Temperance in Modern History: An International Encyclopedia. Vol. I: A–L. ABC-Clio. pp. 544–545. ISBN 978-1-57607-833-4 – via Google Books.
- "Milwaukee Brewery Strike Ends". The New York Times. July 27, 1953. ISSN 0362-4331. Archived from the original on June 1, 2021.
- "76-Day Beer Strike Over; Milwaukee Brewery Workers Get 20-Cent Hourly Rise". The New York Times. Associated Press. July 30, 1953. ISSN 0362-4331. Archived from the original on June 1, 2021.
- Wild, Matt (May 17, 2017). "Remembering the Great Milwaukee Brewery Strike of 1953". Milwaukee Record. Archived from the original on October 22, 2020.
