= Leinenkugel's =

American beer maker

Coordinates: 44.943323°N 91.39543°W

Jacob Leinenkugel Brewing Company

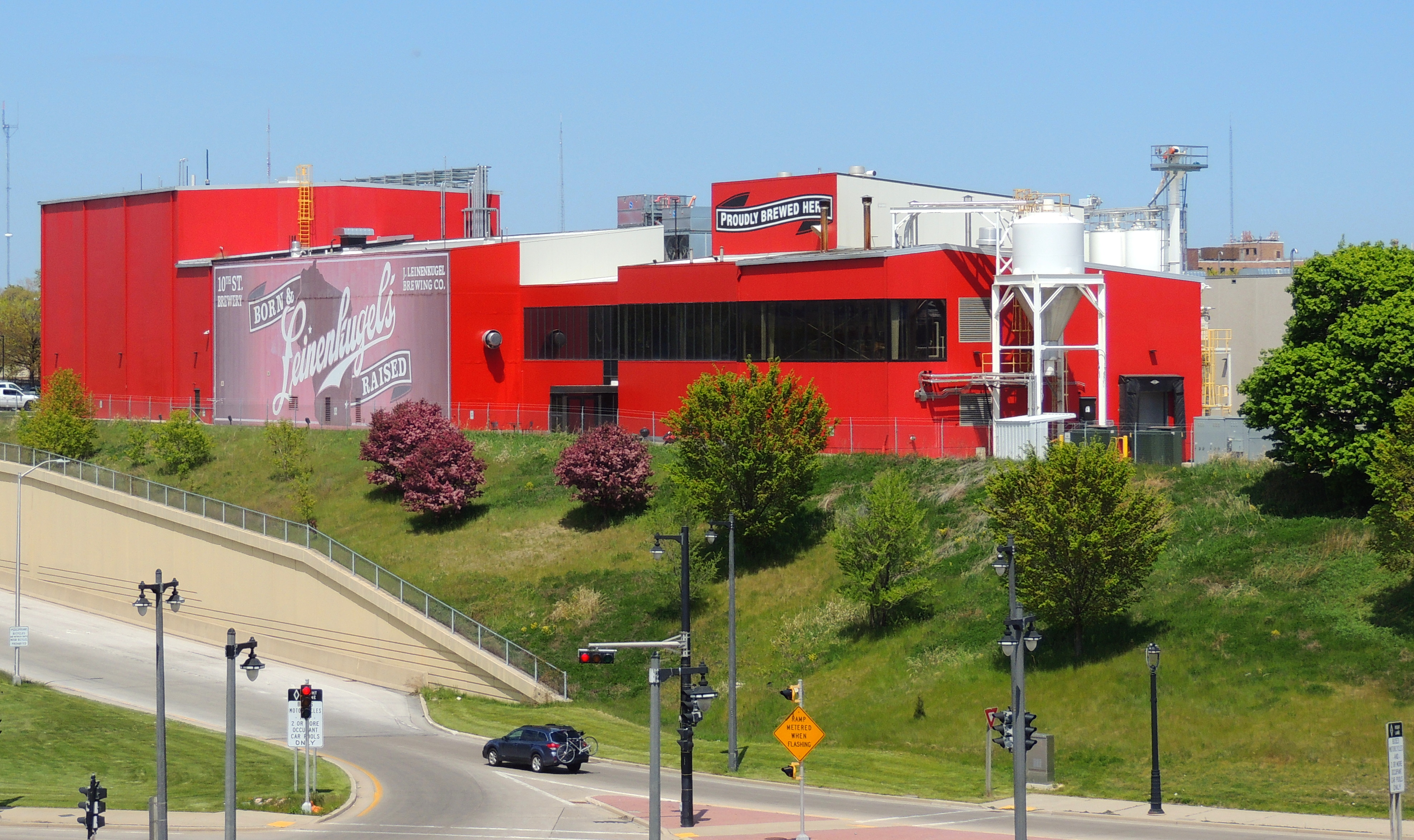
- Jacob Leinenkugel Brewing Company's 10th Street Brewery in Milwaukee
- Founded: 1867
- Headquarters: Chippewa Falls, Wisconsin; United States
- Owner: Molson Coors
- Parent: Molson Coors Beverage Company

The Jacob Leinenkugel Brewing Company (/ˈlaɪnənkuːɡəl/), doing business as Leinenkugel's, is an American beer maker based in Chippewa Falls, Wisconsin. Leinenkugel's was historically distributed only in the Upper Midwest, but is now available throughout all 50 states. The company is the seventh oldest brewery in the U.S., and the oldest business in Chippewa Falls. It is a subsidiary of Molson Coors. It produces both traditional beers including lagers and ales, as well as a popular line of shandies, which are a mixture of beer with fruit juices like lemonade.

== History ==
The brewery was co-founded in Chippewa Falls in May 1867 by Prussian immigrant Jacob Mathias Leinenkugel (1842–1899) and John Miller, making it the seventh oldest brewery in the United States. The original beer brewed, which historically made up 90% of company production, is based on a formula Leinenkugel brought with him from Germany. The company is the oldest operating business in Chippewa Falls. Miller sold his stake in the company in 1884.

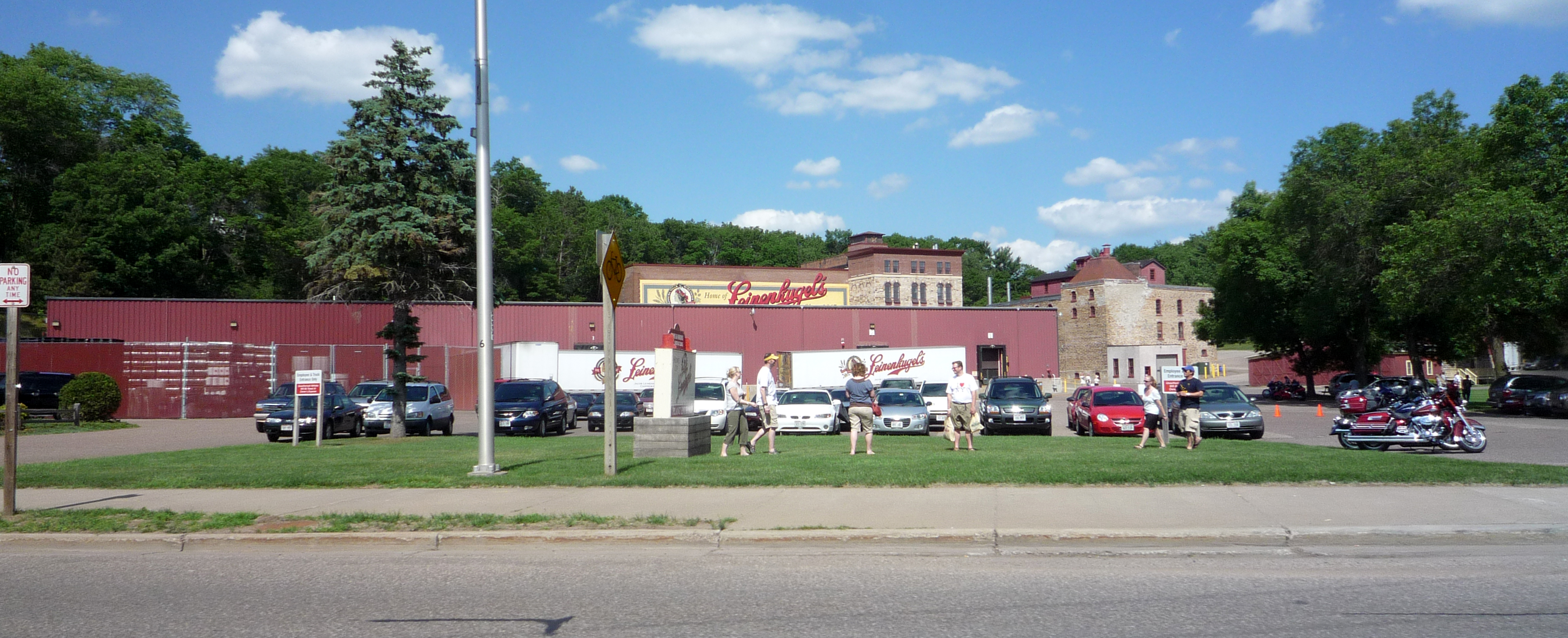
The original Leinenkugel's brewery in Chippewa Falls, Wisconsin

During Prohibition, the company produced near beer (known regionally as "Leino") as well as soda water. With the repeal of Prohibition, Leinenkugel's daughters mortgaged their homes to fund the restoration of the company's beer brewing vats.

The Leinenkugel's brewery expanded from its local roots beginning in the 1970s, when it first introduced its light beer. The family-owned brewery was sold in 1988 to Philip Morris subsidiary Miller Brewing Company in an effort to stay solvent. In an unprecedented move at the time, Miller kept the Leinenkugel family on to run its operation. After several attempts to bring the beer to national U.S. markets, Miller succeeded in 2007 with the addition of a Summer Shandy ale to the Leinenkugel's product line. The company has since become well known for its sweeter beers and shandies, with nine out of ten shandies consumed in the United States being brewed by Leinenkugel's.

On October 11, 2016, SABMiller sold its stake in MillerCoors for around US$12 billion after the company was acquired by Anheuser-Busch InBev, making Molson Coors the sole owner of all Miller brands including Leinenkugel's. As of 2016, the brewery was distributed in all 50 states and its president was still a family member, Dick Leinenkugel. For the company's 150th anniversary, it created a special, "old style" German beer, which was actually brewed by license in Germany via Hofbräu.

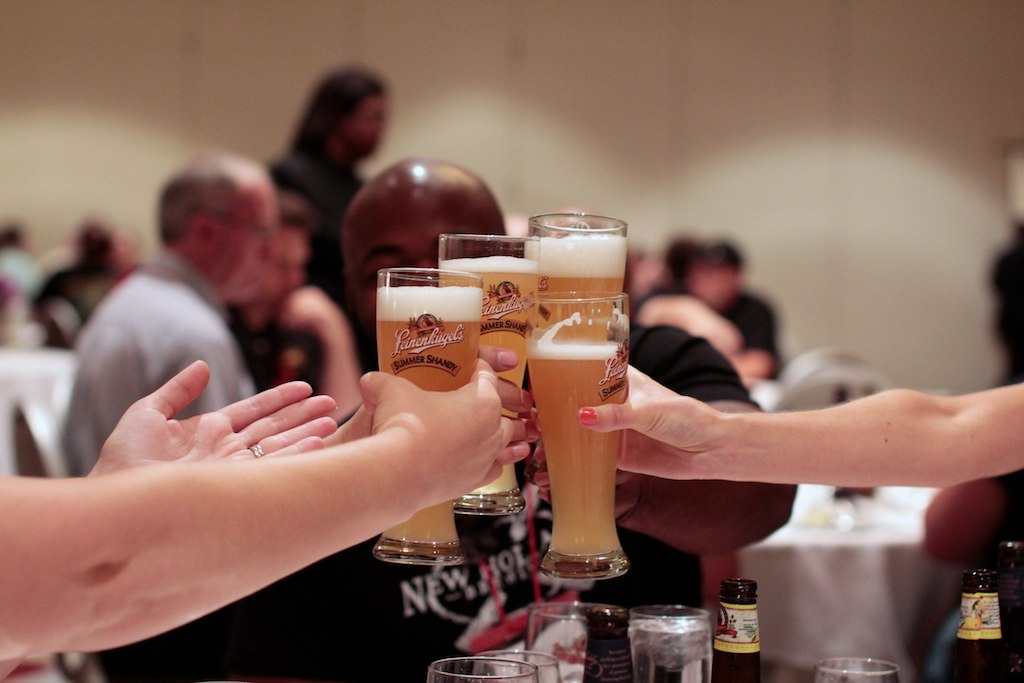
A toast with Leinenkugel's summer shandies

In July 2023, Leinenkugel's workers went on strike for the first time since 1985 over low wages. Members of Teamsters Local 662, the strike ended on September 1 when a three-year contract was ratified. On November 6, 2024, MolsonCoors announced the 157 year old brewery in Chippewa Falls and Leinenkugel's 10th Street Brewery would be closed by January 17, 2025 and operations consolidated in Milwaukee.

In January 2026, Katie Leinenkugel became the family's sixth generation to head the brewery.

The existing Leinenkugel's brewery location in Chippewa Falls is still offering tours that delve into their six-generation legacy. Located nearby is Leinie Lodge, a family-friendly establishment with its pilot brewery for small-batch brewing, tasting room and retail store where visitors can find Leinenkugel merchandise.

== Breweries ==
Leinenkugel's operated two breweries until 2025, but Molson-Coors closed the original location that year. The original, the company's base of operations, was located in Chippewa Falls; and the 10th Street Brewery is in Milwaukee. The 10th Street Brewery (formerly the Valentin Blatz Brewing Company brewery), was opened in 1986 by G. Heileman Brewing Company for the Blatz label. It was purchased by Leinenkugel's in 1995. It produces Leinenkugel's Big Eddy ale line, a series of seasonal, high alcohol beers.

== Products ==
As of 2019, beers produced by Leinenkugel's include:

=== Beers ===
- Honey Weiss, wheat beer with honey
- Sunset Wheat, wheat beer (fall seasonal)
- Berry Weiss, wheat beer with berries
- Creamy Dark, dark lager
- Leinenkugel's Original, pilsner
- Wisconsin Red Pale Ale, a pale ale
- Leinenkugel's Light, a light beer
- Canoe Paddler, a Kölsch (summer seasonal)
- Oktoberfest, a Märzen (fall seasonal)
- Snowdrift, a vanilla porter (winter seasonal)
- Cherry Blonde Lager
- Red Lager
- Northwoods Lager

=== Shandys ===
- Orange Shandy
- Berry Shandy
- Summer Shandy (lemon flavored)
- Grapefruit Shandy
- Watermelon Shandy
- Pomegranate Shandy
- Harvest Patch Shandy (pumpkin spice flavored, a fall seasonal)
- Cranberry Ginger Shandy
- Honey Lemon Light

== See also ==
- Beer in Milwaukee
