= Philipp Jung =

German businessman

- Born: December 23, 1845; Dorn-Assenheim, Hesse-Darmstadt
- Died: July 10, 1911 (aged 65)
- Resting place: Calvary Cemetery, Milwaukee, Wisconsin
- Known for: Jung Brewing Company
- Spouse: Anna D. Best

Philipp Jung (December 23, 1845 – July 10, 1911) was a German immigrant to the United States who became a prominent businessman in Wisconsin.

== Personal life ==
Jung was born on December 23, 1845 in Dorn-Assenheim, Hesse-Darmstadt, which today is a part of Reichelsheim in Wetteraukreis, Hesse, Germany. He immigrated to the United States in 1870, living first in New York and Cincinnati, and finally settling in Milwaukee. Jung married Anna D. Best, daughter of the brewer Jacob Best, and they had six children: Philipp Jr., Elizabeth, Adolph, Helen, Anna, and Ernst. He died July 10, 1911 and was buried at Calvary Cemetery in Milwaukee.

== Career ==
After his arrival in the United States, Jung was employed by Rogge and Feigenhaln Brewing Company in New York. He also worked as the maltster for the Foss, Schneider and Brenner Brewing Company in Cincinnati. After moving to Milwaukee in 1873, Jung became second foreman for the Phillip Best Brewing Company, then first foreman, and finally superintendent of the company's south side plant. In 1879, he left Best to form a partnership with Ernst Borchert, founding the Jung & Borchert Brewing Company. In 1888 this became the Falk, Jung & Borchert Brewing Company in one of the earliest mergers involving Milwaukee breweries. The company became a rival to the Philip Best Brewery, which was operated by Frederick Pabst and later became the Pabst Brewing Company. Jung was considered "an important factor both as a manufacturer of large quantities and also as one who gave a distinctive quality to the goods sent out from his plant."

In 1896, Jung purchased the Jacob Obermann Brewery at Fifth and Cherry Streets in Milwaukee, where he established The Jung Brewing Company. This firm grew and outlived its founder, finally closing because of Prohibition.
