= Jacob Obermann =

American businessman

- Born: March 23, 1819; Germany
- Died: April 24, 1887 (aged 68)
- Resting place: Union Cemetery, Milwaukee, Wisconsin
- Known for: Jacob Obermann Brewery

Jacob Obermann (March 23, 1819 – April 24, 1887) was a German immigrant to the United States who became a prominent businessman in Milwaukee, Wisconsin's brewing industry.

== Personal life ==
Obermann was born in Germany on March 23, 1819. He immigrated to the United States in 1843. He was a Mason and a member of the Turner Society. His father was Peter and he had a brother (Caspar) and sister (Catherine). He married twice; Maria until her death in 1852, then Barbara. He had four children (Barbara, Mary, Richard, Edwin) with his second wife. He had at least four other children (Philip, Gustav, George, Herman), probably from his first marriage. He was a member of the Milwaukee Common Council. He died on April 24, 1887, at the age of 68 and is buried in Union Cemetery in Milwaukee, Wisconsin.

== Career ==
Obermann began his career as a shoemaker in 1843, then opened a store in 1849. He continued with his shoe business until opening a brewery (named Germania Brewery) at 5th and Cherry streets in Milwaukee, Wisconsin in 1854 and brewed 'Standard', 'Weiner' and 'Extra Brew' styles of beer. He had a partner in the business by the name of Max Fueger. He added an ice house in 1866. The brewery was the city's largest for twenty years until 1874. By 1880, the brewer, along with his sons, was producing 30,000 barrels of beer annually. Obermann's brewery became one of the leaders in Milwaukee's brewing industry until his death in 1887. He was a member of the Brewers' Insurance Company of America and a founding member of the Mechanics Mutual Fire Insurance Company.

== Aftermath of the brewery ==
After Jacob Obermann's death, the business was continued by his sons until debt problems, due to an investment in Chicago, Illinois, incurred a loss of $200,000, caused the company to go into receivership in 1893, then again in 1895. The brewery was subsequently sold at auction to Philipp Jung. Obermann's son Gustav went on to operate a brewery of his own at the end of the 19th century.

== See also ==
- List of defunct breweries in the United States
