= Cream City Brewing Company =

Beer company in Milwaukee, WI, US (1853-1937)

The Cream City Brewing Company was an American brewery that was located in Milwaukee, Wisconsin from 1853 until 1937. The brewery was one of seven to survive Prohibition in the city. One structure remains from the old brewery complex; a 25,000 square-foot horse stable built in 1910 that housed over forty horses to pull wagons.

== History ==
The brewery was built in 1853 by George and Conrad Weir. It was called West Hill Brewery at the time and was owned by George Weir and Christopher Forster. Ownership of the brewery changed several times until John Beck bought out his partner Stephen Weber in 1861, and retained ownership until 1877 when it was sold to Jacob Veldt. Two years later it was sold to William Gerlach who renamed the brewery Cream City Brewing Company. During the 19th century, the brewery was emerging as a significant player in the Milwaukee beer market. In the 1880s, the facility produced 25,000 barrels of beer annually. The company was able to survive Prohibition by selling near beer. However, due to debt problems, the company was foreclosed by creditors in 1937.

== Brands ==
- Big Boy Beer
- Blue Jay Beer
- Bock Beer
- Cream City Draft Beer
- Cream City Export Beer
- Cream City Pale Beer
- Cream City Pelham Club Beer
- Cream City Pilsener Beer
- Extra Stock Dark Beer
- Hanover Dark Beer
- Pelham Club Extra Brew Pale Beer
- Pilsener Beer

== See also ==
- Beer in Milwaukee
- List of defunct breweries in the United States
