= Milwaukee Ale House =

American brewpub in Milwaukee, Wisconsin

The Milwaukee Ale House is an American brewery in Milwaukee, Wisconsin brewery that also operates a pub and restaurant in Grafton, Wisconsin. It previously operated a pub and restaurant for 25 years (1997–2022) in the Historic Third Ward neighborhood of Milwaukee, Wisconsin.

== Restaurants ==
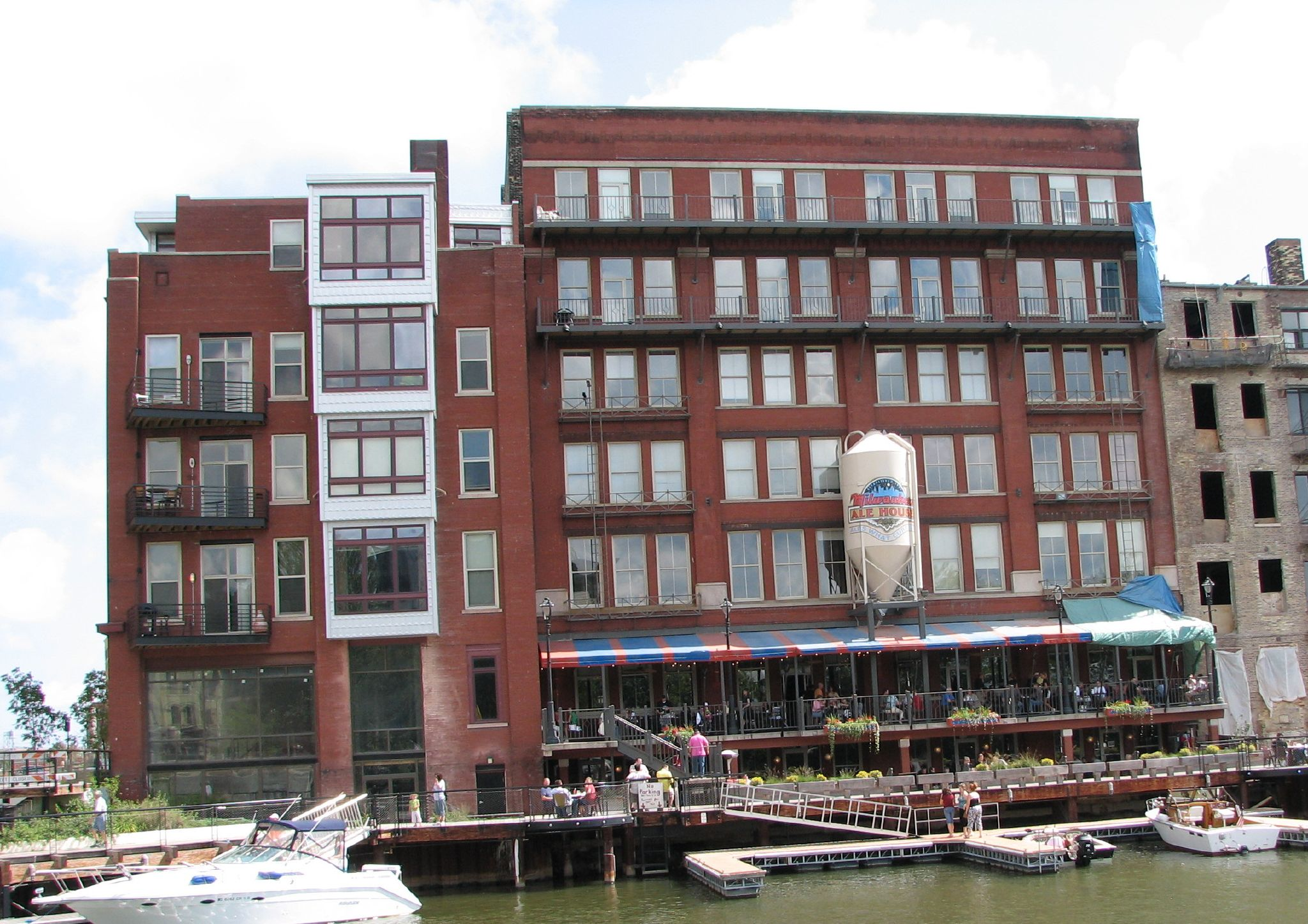
former location in the Historic Third Third Ward

The company began with the October 17, 1997 opening of its first pub/restaurant location on October 17, 1997. It was located at 223 North Water Street in the Historic Third Ward neighborhood of Milwaukee, Wisconsin, in a building between Water Street and the Milwaukee River in Milwaukee's Historic Third Ward. As of 2002, it offered 10 distinct styles of beer in addition to a full menu of food. It had an outdoor patio overlooking the Milwaukee River, and was described in travel guides as "one of Wisconsin's most acclaimed brew pubs." The pub featured live music weekly and was recognized as the Best Music Venue by the Wisconsin Area Music Industry in 1999. After 25 years of operation, in 2022 it was announced that the Historic Third Ward location would close. It had been months earlier reported that the location was facing a significant increase to its rent.

On May 14, 2008, the company opened a second location in Grafton, Wisconsin on May 14, 2008, similarly located along the banks the Milwaukee River. As of 2025, this location remains in operation.

== Local sale of beer ==
Milwaukee Ale House began to bottle and distribute its beers locally in the summer of 2008. In 2019, production of its house beers was moved to a 43,000 square feet (4,000 m^{2}) facility at the Pabst Brewery District in Milwaukee.

== See also ==
- Beer in Milwaukee
