= Rhinelander Brewing Company =

Brewery in Rhinelander, Wisconsin

Coordinates: 45°38′13.0″N 89°24′44.5″W

- Industry: Alcoholic beverage
- Founded: 1882
- Headquarters: 43 South Brown Street, Rhinelander, Wisconsin; United States
- Products: Beer
- Owner: Jyoti Auluck
- Website: Official Website

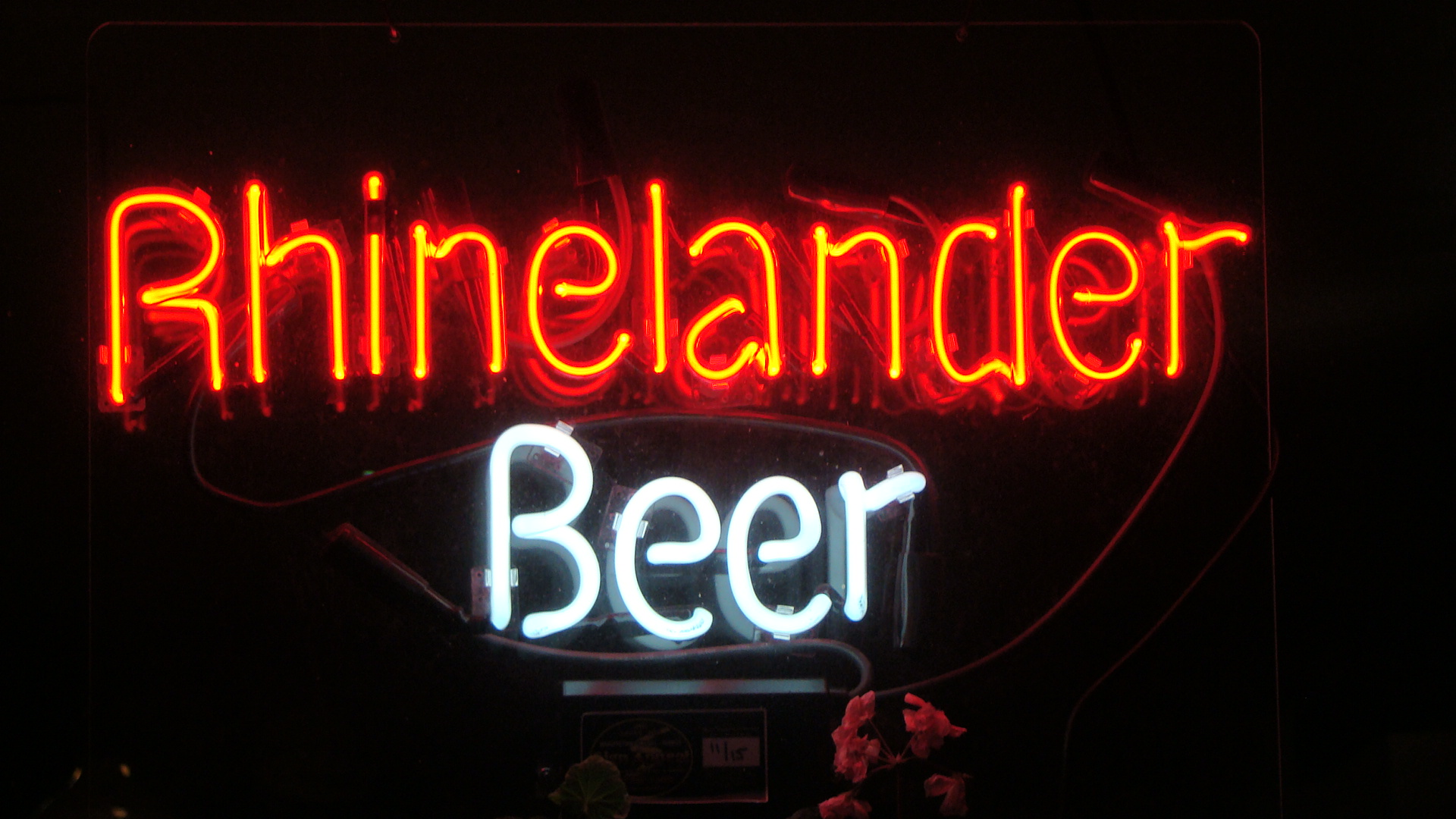
A neon Rhinelander Beer sign

Rhinelander Brewery is a regional American brewery located in Rhinelander, Wisconsin.

== History ==
The original company was founded in 1882 by Otto Hilgermann and Henry Danner. The original brewery was located on Ocala Street in Rhinelander, next to the Pelican River. Although the brewery burned down in 1897, it was subsequently rebuilt. During the Prohibition era, the company closed its operations, but reopened after prohibition ended in 1933, by issuing stock. Later, financial difficulties led to the company closing its doors in 1967. However, the Joseph Huber Brewing Company (since acquired by the Minhas Craft Brewery) purchased the Rhinelander brands and their recipes and other assets and began producing Rhinelander beer in Monroe, Wisconsin, where it was brewed for several decades.

At its peak, the Rhinelander Brewery produced 40,000 barrels annually. It was once among the most prominent local breweries in the country. At a time when small breweries dotted the landscape, Rhinelander stood out with its aggressive marketing and inventiveness. The company patented the 7-ounce "Shorty" bottle and advertised the product heavily, with great success.

== The company today ==
In 2009, Jyoti Auluck acquired the Rhinelander and Rhinelander Light beer brands, and all related assets of the company. The plan was to continue making Rhinelander Export and Rhinelander Light beers in Monroe on a contract basis, and eventually build a brewery in downtown Rhinelander. The proposed $2 million brewery was initially planned with a production capacity of 30,000 barrels of beer in kegs, cans and bottles. The company's plans for the brand's future were similar to the marketing methods used by the Pabst Brewing Company to promote two other retro brands with great success — Pabst Blue Ribbon and Schlitz. The company also took the Rhinelander brands back to the original secret recipe.

In May, 2011, the company announced the reintroduction of the Rhinelander Shorty. New molds were created, to produce the 7-ounce Shorty-style glass bottle.

In 2016, the company introduced Rhinelander Hard Root Beer, and later expanded their line of hard sodas to include the Over the Barrel brand, which include Rootbeer, Blueberry, Cream Soda, Black Cherry and Grape.

On April 13, 2018, the ribbon cutting and opening ceremony were held to celebrate the opening of the new brewery in Rhinelander. The newly renovated Brewery, taproom and gift shop are located on Brown Street in downtown Rhinelander. The new facility is also home to the Rhinelander Brewery Museum.

Rhinelander Brewing Company now produces and sells over 1 million pints of beers per year throughout the Midwest.

== Brands ==
In addition to many seasonal and specialty beers, the company's main products include:

- Rhinelander Export Lager
- Rhinelander Original
- Rhinelander Light Lager

Rhinelander manufacturers the "Boatswain" brand beers for Trader Joe's. The company also manufactures the Good Ass Beer brand, under contract.

The company owns the trademark for "Braumeister", a signature brand from former Milwaukee, Wisconsin brewer Independent Milwaukee Brewery.
