= A. Gettelman Brewing Company =

Defunct American brewery

The A. Gettelman Brewing Company was an American brewery in Milwaukee, Wisconsin from 1856 until 1961, when the Miller Brewing Company bought it. It was the smallest of the "Big Five" breweries from Milwaukee's brewing legacy (Schlitz, Pabst, Miller, and Blatz being the others). Miller still makes one Gettleman brand, Milwaukee's Best.

In 2017, the old Gettleman Brewery was given historic designation status by Milwaukee's Historic Preservation Commission. In 2018, through a compromise with the commission, MillerCoors demolished the original brewery, which dated back to the 1850s, but preserved a house from 1856 that was used as an office and lab-testing. The company uses an image of the former facility on the label of its Icehouse beer.

== History ==
The company was founded by George Schweickhart (1824–1905) as George Schweickhart's Menomonee Brewery in 1856. In 1871, Schweickhart added Adam Gettelman (1847–1925) as a partner. Adam Gettelman became sole owner in 1876 and renamed the brewery A. Gettelman Brewing Company. The facility was rebuilt after a fire destroyed most of the original building in 1877. In 1891, the brewer introduced its "$1,000 Beer" challenge, promising to award $1,000 to any chemist who could prove it was made with anything other than pure barley, hops, and malt. In 1895, Gettleman introduced the Milwaukee's Best brand. Gettelman Brewery sold "near beer" during Prohibition. In 1946, inspired by heinzelmännchen of German folklore, the company introduced an eight-ounce beer bottle called "Fritzie". The company was one of six breweries involved in the 1953 Milwaukee brewery strike. In 1959, they became distributors for Tucher Brewery of Nuremberg, Germany. This was the first such relationship with a foreign brewer by an American brewing company. The company was sold in 1961 to Miller Brewing Company. The company did not market their product nationally.

== Brands ==
- $1,000 Natural Process
- Five O'Clock Club Beer
- Milwaukee's Best
- Rathskeller Brew
- Stein Brew

== See also ==
- Beer in Milwaukee
- List of defunct breweries in the United States
