= Gambrinus Brewing Co. =

The Gambrinus Brewing Co. was a brewery located in Oshkosh, Wisconsin. It is no longer in production.

It was founded by Lorenz Kuenzl, a native of Bohemia in the Austrian Empire, and operated by Kuenzl, his wife Barbara Walters, and his brother-in-law. It was named after Gambrinus, an unofficial patron saint of brewing. The brewery was located in Oshkosh on Harney street, where the original homestead still stands. Rivals starting popping up everywhere. The Bavarian immigrant August Horn and the German-born Lenhardt Schwalm teamed up in 1864 or 1866 to form the Brooklyn Brewery, named after the part of Oshkosh in which it was located. The families lived above the brewery in a two-story frame structure and took in boarders to help pay the bills. A devastating fire in 1879 left the partners undaunted, and they rebuilt the business on the same site. Competition eventually forced its owners to merge with two other brewers in 1894, Union Brewing Co., operated by John Glatz, and Gambrinus Brewing Co. Each merging member of the new brewery gave each other one dollar to seal the deal. When the three breweries combined, the Gambrinus Brewery continued to do the bottling for the new brewery on the Harney site. Lorenz Kuenzl was the first brewer and general manager. The business, now named Oshkosh Brewery Co., was located at 1610 Doty St.

It closed in 1971. The brewery's main product was Chief Oshkosh Beer, named after the Menominee Chief Oshkosh (1795–1858). The chief was involved in major events, including treaty settlements, military activities, and the case of the lost Partridge child.

When the Oshkosh Brewing Company closed on October 18, 1971, the Chief Oshkosh, Badger, Rahr's, and Lebrau brands were sold to The Peoples Brewing Company also located in Oshkosh. On November 8, 1972, The Peoples Brewing Company halted beer production and in 1973 the company's assets were put up for auction.
