= The Labor Tribune =

Newspaper published in Missouri, US

Coordinates: 38.6279866°N 90.2250061°W

- Proudly owned by the unions of St. Louis and southern Illinois

- 2026 front page
- Founder: Maury Rubin
- Founded: 1937
- Political alignment: Left-wing, AFL–CIO-endorsed,
- Language: English
- Headquarters: 505 South Ewing Avenue
- City: Saint Louis, Missouri
- Country: United States
- Readership: 60,000 paid subscribers (self-reported)
- Website: labortribune.com

The Labor Tribune is a Saint Louis based long form newspaper that focuses on the labor related topics. The newspaper has 60,000 active subscribers and is the official labor newspaper for the Greater Saint Louis and Southern Illinois area. The newspaper was established in 1937 by Maury Rubin and has been in consistent circulation since then.
