= Milwaukee's Best =

American beer brand

Milwaukee's Best is a 4.8% alcohol by volume, American-style pale lager brewed by Miller Brewing Company of Milwaukee, Wisconsin, in the United States. Its sibling beers are Milwaukee's Best Ice (5.9%) and Milwaukee's Best Light, which is 4.1%. It is sometimes referred to as "the Beast".

== History ==
Established in 1895 as Gettelman's Milwaukee's Best Beer, Miller Brewing Company shortened the brand name to Milwaukee's Best when they took over the A. Gettelman Brewing Company of Milwaukee in 1961.

Since then, the best-selling offering, Milwaukee's Best Light, was introduced in 1986, and Milwaukee's Best Ice was introduced in 1992.

According to a report by Beer Marketer's Insights and published by USA Today on December 9, 2013, sales of Milwaukee's Best in America have declined in recent years. Despite MillerCoors shipping nearly 2 million barrels in 2007, sales of the beer dropped over the next five years, with just 1.1 million barrels sold.

Molson Coors announced the discontinuation of the original Milwaukee's Best in August 2021 as it cut back on its low-end beers. The Ice and Light varieties were not included in the change.

== Products ==
=== Milwaukee's Best Lager ===
In the fall of 2016, the alcohol content was increased from 4.3% to 4.8%, and the name changed from "Milwaukee's Best Premium" to "Milwaukee's Best Lager". The name was eventually changed back to "Milwaukee's Best Premium".

=== Milwaukee's Best Ice ===
In the fall of 2016, the alcohol content was increased from 5.9% to 6.9%. In August 2017, it was reduced back to 5.9%. It is sometimes referred to as “the Yeti”.

== Awards ==
=== Milwaukee's Best ===
- Bronze medal, 2005 Great American Beer Festival, American-Style Lager
- Silver medal, 2004 Great American Beer Festival, American-Style Lager
- Silver medal, 2003 Great American Beer Festival, American Lager/Ale or Cream Ale

=== Milwaukee's Best Light ===
- Silver medal, 2006 Great American Beer Festival, American-Style Light Lager
- Bronze medal, 2009 United States Beer Championships, American Light

=== Milwaukee's Best Ice ===
- Bronze medal, 2003 Great American Beer Festival, American-Style Specialty Lager
- Bronze medal, 2006 World Beer Cup, American-Style Specialty Lager

== Advertising ==
In 2006, MillerCoors ran a series of ads depicting men who were perceived as being unmanly, and are subsequently crushed by a giant can of Milwaukee's Best Light falling from the sky, followed by the slogan "Men should act like men, and light beer should taste like beer."

In 2016, advertisements for Milwaukee's Best Ice drew criticism for their focus on the increased alcohol content of the beer.
