= Lakefront Brewery =

Brewery in Milwaukee, Wisconsin

Coordinates: 43.054683°N 87.905105°W

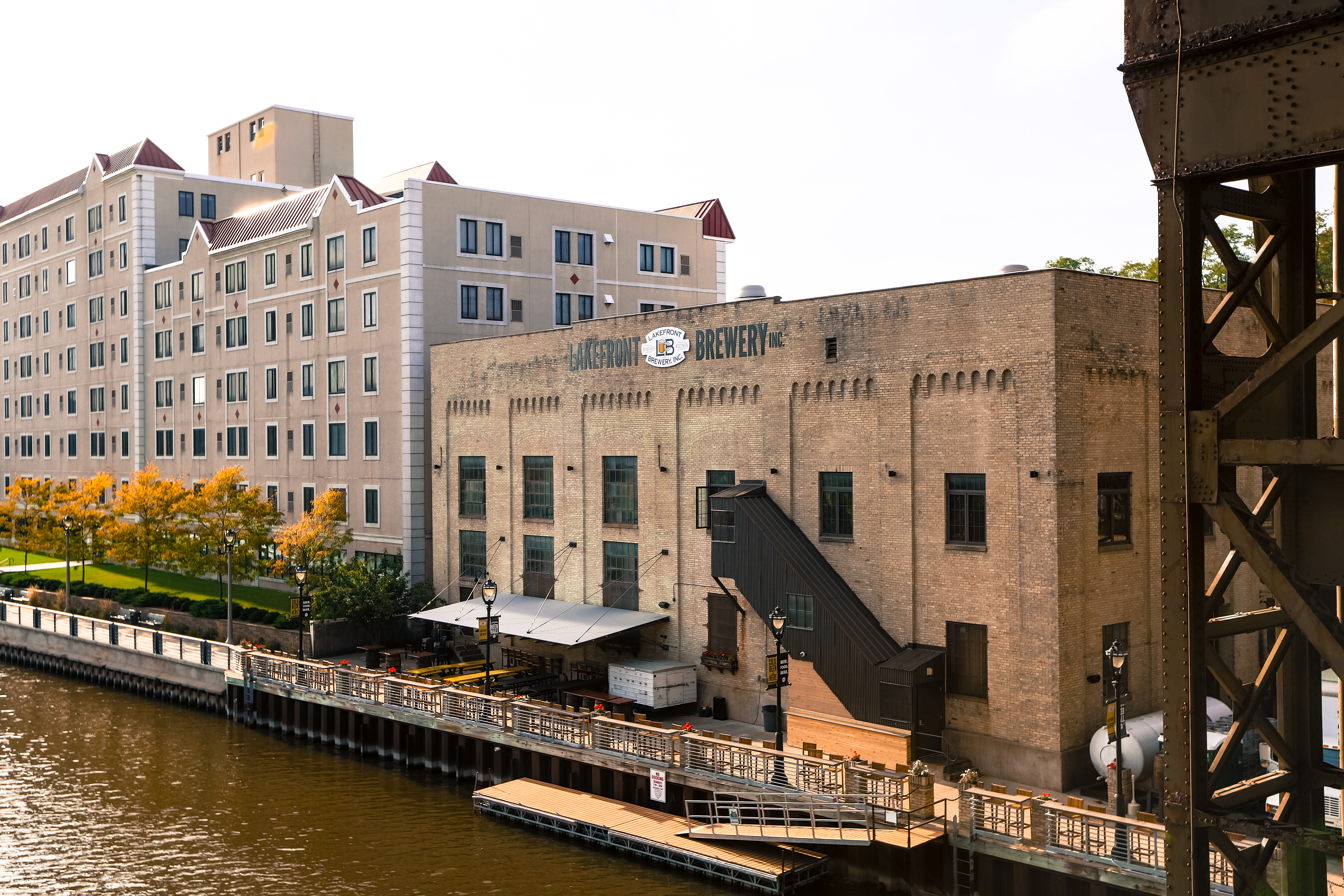
The back of Lakefront Brewery (and Brewers' Point Apartments) along the Milwaukee River.

Lakefront Brewery, Inc. is a brewery in Milwaukee, Wisconsin, United States. The brewery is based in the Beerline B neighborhood of Milwaukee, Wisconsin. Founded in 1987 by brothers Russ and Jim Klisch, several of its brands are named after Milwaukee neighborhoods, such as Riverwest Stein Beer and East Side Dark. The brewery was the first in the U.S. to bottle fruit beer since prohibition was repealed, starting in 1992 with the seasonal Lakefront Cherry Lager. The brewery often uses Wisconsin-grown ingredients, including Door County cherries.

In 1996, Lakefront became the first certified organic brewery in the country and produced the first organic beer to be bottled in the U.S. - their Organic E.S.B. (extra special bitter). The ale is brewed using 100% organic malt and hops. President, owner and founder Russ Klisch started a partnership with Wisconsin farmers to grow organic hops in his home state.

In May 2007, The Wisconsin Department of Tourism announced that Lakefront Brewery had become the first brewery in the state and the first business in the City of Milwaukee to receive the Travel Green Wisconsin certification. Travel Green Wisconsin recognizes tourism-related businesses that are reducing their environmental impact through operational and other improvements. To achieve Travel Green certification, businesses must meet several goals including demonstration of how they encourage staff and vendors to be environmentally aware and how they reduce their waste and energy consumption.

The brewery is noted for its gluten-free brand, New Grist, which is brewed using sorghum and gluten-free yeast. The brewery successfully petitioned the U.S. Alcohol and Tobacco Tax and Trade Bureau to allow this product to be called a beer despite not having the previously required 25% malted barley content, thus creating the first gluten-free beer in America.

Growth of the brewery has been strong in recent years, especially due to the gluten-free product. The brewery shipped 8,863 barrels of beer to wholesalers in 2006, a 2,571 barrels, or 41% increase from the 2005 total. The success of the gluten-free product has attracted competitive interest from other brewers, large and small.

== Brewery tour ==
Lakefront Brewery doesn't make people wait until the end of their tour to drink beer. They believe there is a direct correlation between attention span on beer tours and drinking beer. To meet their philosophy, the company provides beer at the start of the tour, shares jokes along the way, and explains the brewing process and history of Lakefront. Tour tickets can be purchased online or at the door. The price of admission includes a souvenir pint glass and four 8 oz. pours of beer.

Many people on staff give the tour, and there is no specific script. Employees are encouraged to inform guests of certain attractions such as the BAS (colloquially referred to as the Big-Ass Silo, a large silo in the brewery that is used for grain storage), but also to add their own style and jokes to entertain along the way. One of the more common jokes given during the tours is that Lakefront "sells as much beer in one year as Miller spills in one day".

The most well-known part of the tour is the stop at the bottling line. There, visitors get to sing-a-long to the theme from Laverne and Shirley, the 1970s TV show, whose characters worked at the fictional Shotz Brewery. One lucky tour participant even gets to place a glove on a beer going through the line, as in the show's opening sequence.

The Lakefront Brewery tour has achieved national notoriety on many occasions and was named the “#4 Top Brewery Tour in America” in 2010.

== Historical preservation ==
Lakefront Brewery is the owner of the original Bernie Brewer’s Chalet. When the Milwaukee Brewers built their new stadium, the Chalet needed a new home, and the Klisch brothers wanted that home to be in their brewery. Russ Klisch jumped at the opportunity to buy the item. The lights that hang in the Palm Garden were originally designed and hung in the Plankinton Hotel in 1916 for a beer garden. The hotel was dedicated on the same day as the start of the First World War. Shortly thereafter, prohibition started and, in short, the beer garden was never used as a beer garden. The lights hung in a restaurant in the hotel until 1982 when the building was demolished. The city of Milwaukee stored them in an architecturally valuable warehouse until the Klisch brothers bid and won them. They have spent over $1,000 renovating each light.

== Palm Garden ==
Starting in late 1999, Russ Davis, a local restaurateur, heard the Klisch brothers wanted to utilize the large banquet hall in their brewery and approached the company, saying that he wanted to rent out the space. The Klisch brothers were interested, but concerned about competing with customers in the area who sold their beer.

They decided to create a family restaurant environment. On Fridays, the Palm Garden offers a fish fry with polka music. They also host private events like weddings and corporate events on evenings.

== Beer Hall ==
At the end of November 2013, Russ Davis did not renew his lease with Lakefront Brewery and the Palm Garden was closed. Since then, Russ Klisch extended his tour hours into the night and opened up the Lakefront Brewery Beer Hall. The Beer Hall serves hand-made German-style, locally sourced food ranging from cheese curds to sustainable beer battered fish. Lakefront Brewery now runs their own fish fry on Friday nights from 4 P.M. to 9 P.M., which features music performed by the Brewhaus Polka Kings.

Lakefront Brewery no longer hosts wedding receptions; however, it is still available for small, catered corporate events.

== Summerfest ==
The brewery also has a strong presence at Summerfest in Milwaukee, featuring its own pavilion selling a variety of its brews, including New Grist.

== See also ==
- Beer in Milwaukee
- Beer in the United States
