= MobCraft Beer =

American craft brewery

MobCraft Beer is an American brewery founded in Madison Wisconsin, and currently located in the Walker's Point neighborhood of Milwaukee Wisconsin. The brewery was founded in 2013 by Henry Schwartz and Andrew Gierczak, and originally was a "crowdsourced brewery" where fans could submit recipes online to be brewed by the company, though this has stopped in recent years. Each month, the brewers would select one beer concept submitted online to enter production for a limited time.

The brewery specializes in sours, wild ales and barrel aged beer. In 2016, the brewery moved to Milwaukee and opened a taproom in Walker's Point. Also in 2016, the founders were contestants on the American television program Shark Tank, but did not secure investment from any of the sharks.

In 2022 the brewery was listed as one of the ten coolest places in America to drink craft beer by Men's Journal.

Mobcraft briefly had an additional location in Denver, but it closed 7 months after opening in 2023. A second taproom was later opened in Woodstock, Illinois.

The brewery produced a "(Not so) Horrible City IPA" in response to alleged comments by Donald Trump in the lead-up to the 2024 Republican National Convention in Milwaukee.

Mobcraft closed in late 2024, amidst a wave of brewery closures across Milwaukee, but reopened in 2025 under new ownership.
