= Valentin Blatz Brewing Company =

- Blatz Brewery Complex
- U.S. National Register of Historic Places
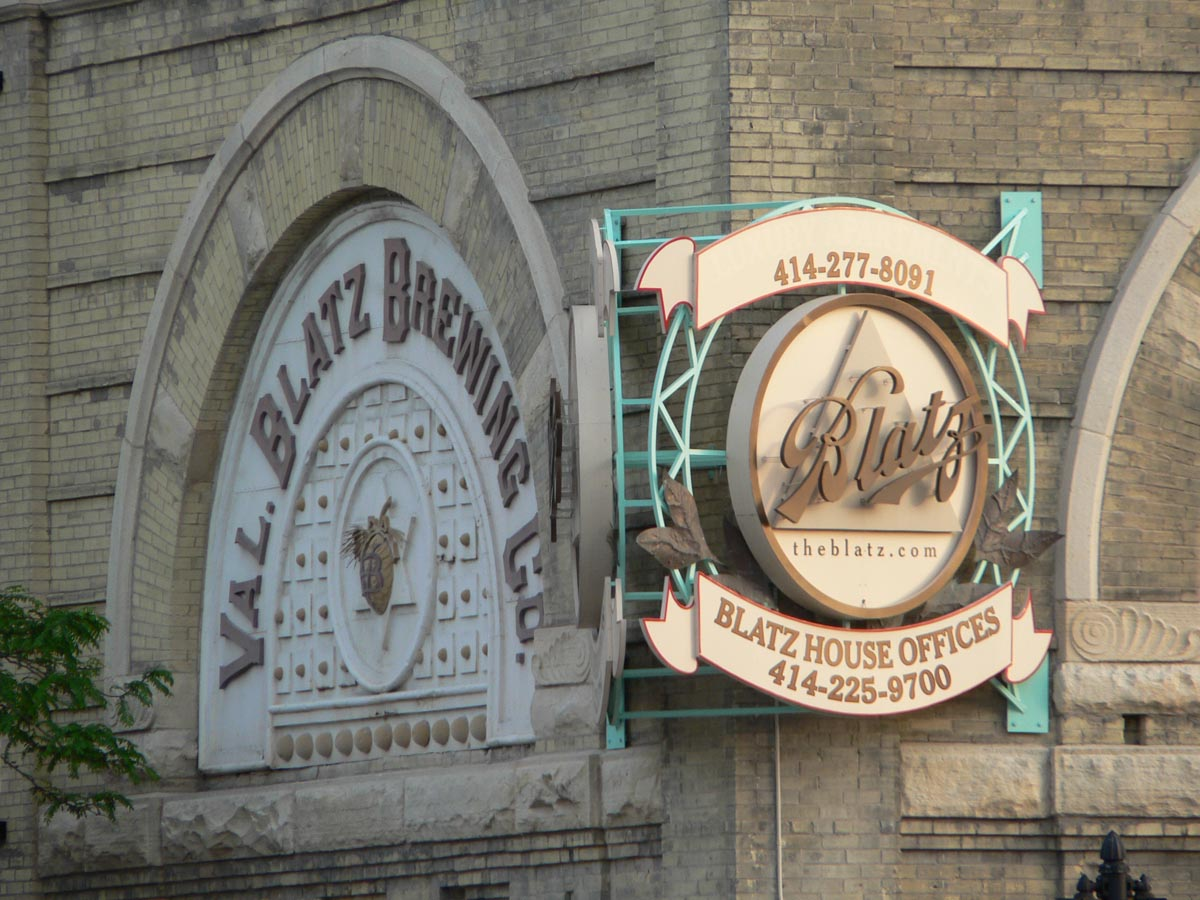
- Building detail from the brewery complex
- Location: Milwaukee, Wisconsin
- Coordinates: 43°2′42.07″N 87°54′32.43″W
- Built: 1891
- Architects: August Gunzmann, Louis Lehle
- NRHP reference No.: 86000793
- Added to NRHP: April 15, 1986

The Valentin Blatz Brewing Company was an American brewery based in Milwaukee, Wisconsin. It produced Blatz Beer from 1851 until 1959, when the label was sold to the Pabst Brewing Company.

Blatz beer is currently produced by the Miller Brewing Company of Milwaukee, under contract for Pabst Brewing Company.

== History ==
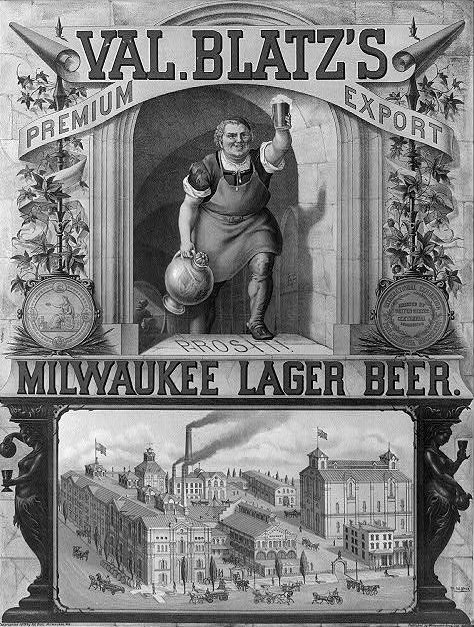
1879 advertisement for Val. Blatz's Milwaukee lager beer

Johann Braun opened City Brewery in 1846. Valentin Blatz established a brewery next door in 1850 and merged both breweries upon Braun's death in 1852. In that year, Valentin's little brewery produced 350 barrels of lager. That beer was for local consumption only, due to short shelf-life. In 1868 Blatz's brewery produced 16,000 barrels.

After a fire destroyed much of the original brewery in 1872, Blatz was able to enlarge and update his facilities with new brewing technology. In 1875, Blatz was the first Milwaukee brewery to have a bottling department to package beer and ship nationally. It incorporated as the Valentin Blatz Brewing Company in 1889. In 1891, the company sold part of its brewing interests to an English syndicate. By the 1900s it was the city's third-largest brewer.

During Prohibition, Blatz produced non-alcoholic beverages such as malt soap, sodas and near beer, from 1920 to 1933. In 1933, Blatz was issued U-Permit No. WIS-U-712, granting permission to resume brewing beer.

In 1953, Blatz was involved in the 1953 Milwaukee brewery strike. In 1958, Pabst Brewing Company, then the nation's tenth largest brewer, acquired Blatz, the eighteenth largest, from Schenley Industries. In 1959, the federal government brought an action charging that the acquisition violated Section 7 of the Clayton Act as amended by the Celler-Kefauver Anti-Merger amendment. The sale was voided in 1959 and Blatz closed that same year. In 1960, the assets of Blatz, including its labels, were sold to Pabst.

In 1969, Blatz was acquired from Pabst by the G. Heileman Brewing Company. Heileman, in turn, was acquired by the Stroh Brewery Company in 1996. On 8 February 1999, prior to its dissolution in 2000, the Stroh Brewery Company sold its labels to the Pabst Brewing Company and to the Miller Brewing Company. By 2007, Blatz was once again part of Pabst.

=== Today ===
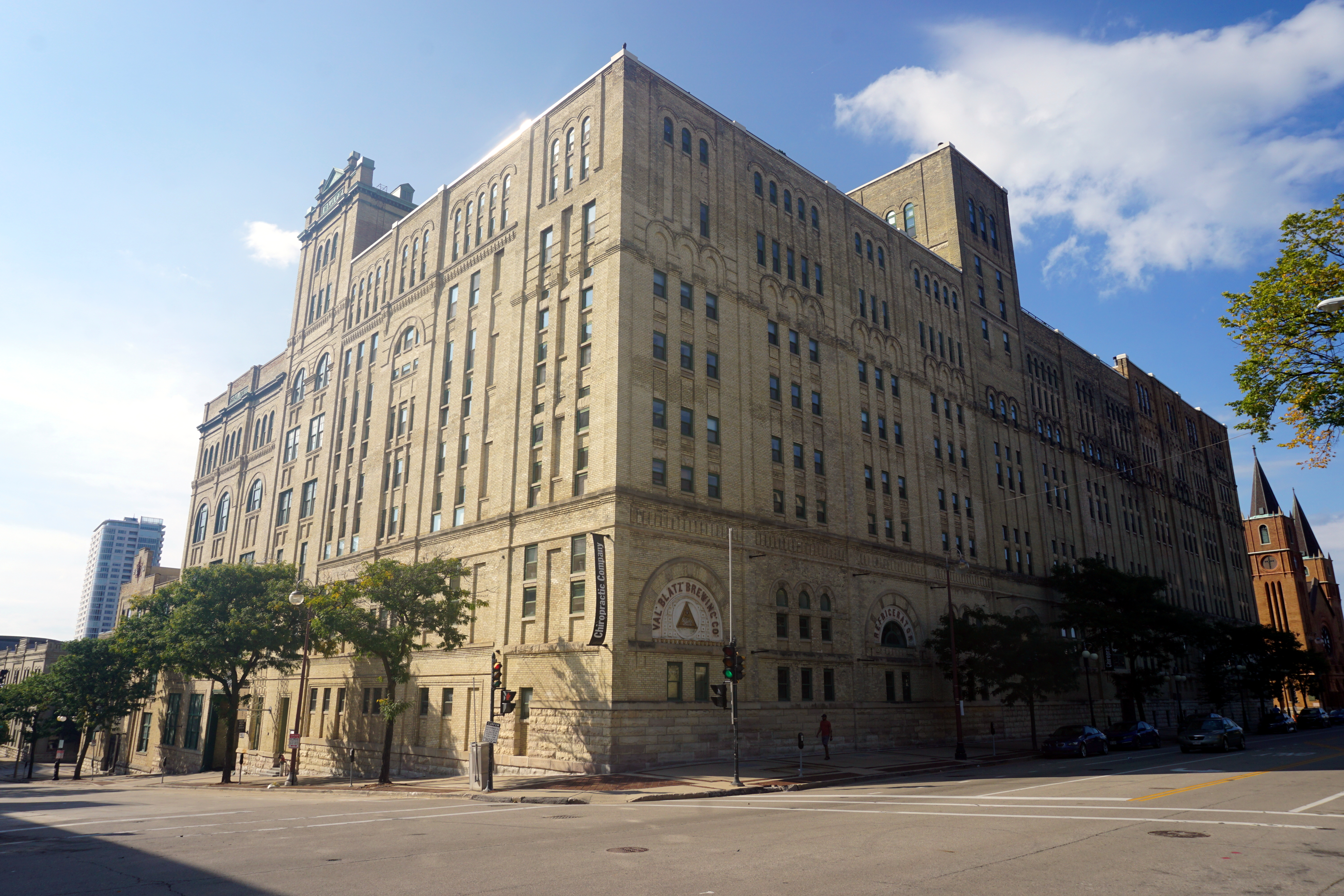
Valentin Blatz Brewing Company Brewhouse in 2022

The "Blatz" beer label currently is produced by the Miller Brewing Company of Milwaukee, under contract for Pabst Brewing Company. The Blatz Brewery Complex and Valentin Blatz Brewing Company Office Building in downtown Milwaukee are listed on the National Register of Historic Places. The brewing company's office building has been converted into condominiums. The former Blatz bottling facility is now the Campus Center Building for the Milwaukee School of Engineering. The office building has been converted into the school's Alumni Partnership Center.

The NRHP-listed Blatz Brewery Complex consists of three historic buildings from the Blatz plant - all of them in a German Renaissance Revival style, with round arches and light trim against dark brick. Stockhouse number 3 is the oldest, a six-story block designed by August Gunzmann and built in 1891, establishing the general style for subsequent buildings. (It is photo 5 in the NRHP photos.) In the 1930s a floor was added to the top of #3, removing original pediments. Stockhouse number 2 is a similar structure built in 1904 with a 2-story square tower atop its center. Stockhouse number 1 was built in 1906, continuing the same design. Other non-contributing buildings from the Blatz plant are the 1904 boilerhouse, the 1906 brewhouse, and the 1910 Mill House.

== Marketing ==
Two famous Blatz/Milwaukee beer marketing slogans were "Blatz—Milwaukee's Finest Beer" and "Blatz—Milwaukee's Favorite Premium Beer". In later years, the brewery described its product as "Draft Brewed Blatz". The two most famous jingles were from the 1950s to early 1970s. One had the words "Kegs, Cans, or Bottles, all taste the same. The three best is one beer—Blatz is the name", playing on the fact that many other beers had a different taste when bottled and canned from how they tasted fresh from the keg. The other had the sung words, "We're from Milwaukee and we oughta know, it's good old Blatz Beer wherever you go. Kegs, Cans and Bottles, all taste the same. The three best is one beer. Blatz is the name." In the 1980s, Blatz was marketed directly against Pabst Blue Ribbon in the "working class" market, as seen in a 1981 "blind taste test" commercial featuring a steel worker.

In 2005, a group of Blatz Beer advocates published and distributed what become known as the "Blatzitution", a guideline regarding the various rules and suggestions on how Blatz Beer should be enjoyed. Those who broke the rules become known as "Blatzphemers." The "Blatzitution" received a positive, though unofficial, endorsement from Pabst Brewery, with a representative citing "We are honored that the great tradition of Blatz Beer is being enjoyed by a new generation of beer drinkers."

== Pop culture ==
=== TV & film ===
In the 1953 cult-classic The Wild One starring Marlon Brando, Brando's character Johnny Strabler is the leader of a biker gang that terrorizes a small town in California. After one of the members of the gang injures himself in a motorcycle crash and is taken to the town doctor, Johnny orders a beer at the local bar and the love interest, Mary Murphy, serves him a bottle of Blatz. Johnny and his gang drink Blatz out of the bottle throughout most of the movie.

In the 1992 film Scent of a Woman, Lt. Col. Frank Slade, portrayed by Al Pacino, abruptly interjects and answers for his companion (Charlie, portrayed by Chris O'Donnell) when the waiter asks which type of beer he would like: "Schlitz. No Schlitz? Blatz. No Blatz? Improvise."

== See also ==
- Beer in Milwaukee
- List of defunct breweries in the United States
