= Pabst Blue Ribbon =

American lager beer

- Type: American-style lager
- Manufacturer: Pabst Brewing Company
- Origin: Milwaukee, Wisconsin, United States
- Introduced: 1844; 182 years ago
- Alcohol by volume: 4.7%
- Website: pabstblueribbon.com

Pabst Blue Ribbon, commonly abbreviated PBR, is an American lager beer sold by Pabst Brewing Company, established in Milwaukee, Wisconsin, in 1844 and currently based in San Antonio, Texas. Originally called Best Select, and then Pabst Select, the current name comes from the blue ribbons tied around the bottle's neck between 1882 and 1916.

== History ==
Gottlieb and Frederika Pabst and their twelve-year-old son Frederick arrived in the United States in 1848 and settled in Chicago where Frederick eventually found work on the ships of Lake Michigan. In 1862, Frederick married Maria Best, daughter of Philip Best, whose father Jacob Best founded the Best Brewing Company, and in 1863 Frederick became a brewer at his father-in-law's brewery.

When Philip Best retired to Germany in 1867, Pabst and Emil Schandein – his sister-in-law's husband and the vice-president of Best Brewery – worked to transform the company into one of the nation's largest brewers, capitalizing on, among other things, the Great Chicago Fire of 1871 that destroyed nineteen Chicago breweries and helped position Milwaukee as the leading beer-producing city in the United States. In 1889, Schandein died, leaving Pabst as president and Schandein's widow, Lisette Schandein, as vice-president. In 1890, Pabst changed the "Best" letterhead to "Pabst" and the Pabst Brewing Company officially began.

This is the original Pabst Blue Ribbon Beer. Nature's choicest products provide its prized flavor. Only the finest of hops and grains are used. Selected as America's Best in 1893.

— Quote from Pabst Blue Ribbon label, referring to the award it received at the 1893 World's Columbian Exposition.

=== Brand name ===
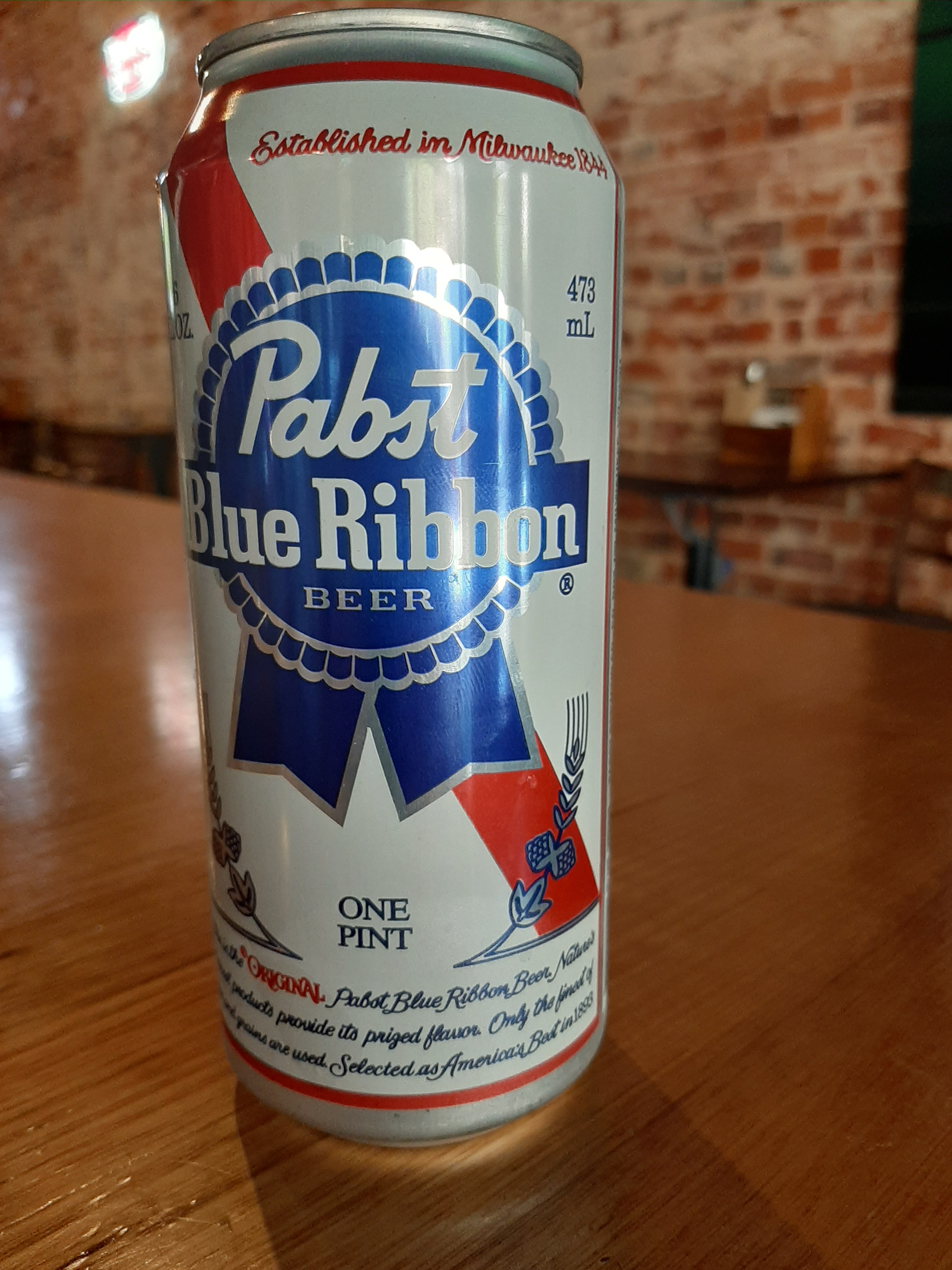
A 16-US-fluid-ounce (470 mL; 17 imp fl oz) can of Pabst Blue Ribbon

The company has historically claimed that its flagship beer was renamed Pabst Blue Ribbon following its win as "America's Best" at the World's Columbian Exposition in Chicago in 1893. Whether the brand actually won an award in 1893 is unclear. Some contemporaneous accounts indicate that many vendors were frustrated by the fair's refusal to award such prizes. One account says that the only prizes awarded by the executive committee were bronze medals, in recognition of "some independent and essential excellence in the article displayed", rather than "merely to indicate the relative merits of competing exhibits". However, the beer had won many other awards at many other fairs – so many, in fact, that Captain Pabst had already started tying silk ribbons around every bottle since 1882. It was a time when beer bottles were more likely to be embossed than labeled. The ribbons were likely added at great cost to Pabst, but Pabst's display of pride was also a display of marketing savvy. Patrons started asking their bartenders for "the blue-ribbon beer."

=== Peak, decline, and revival ===
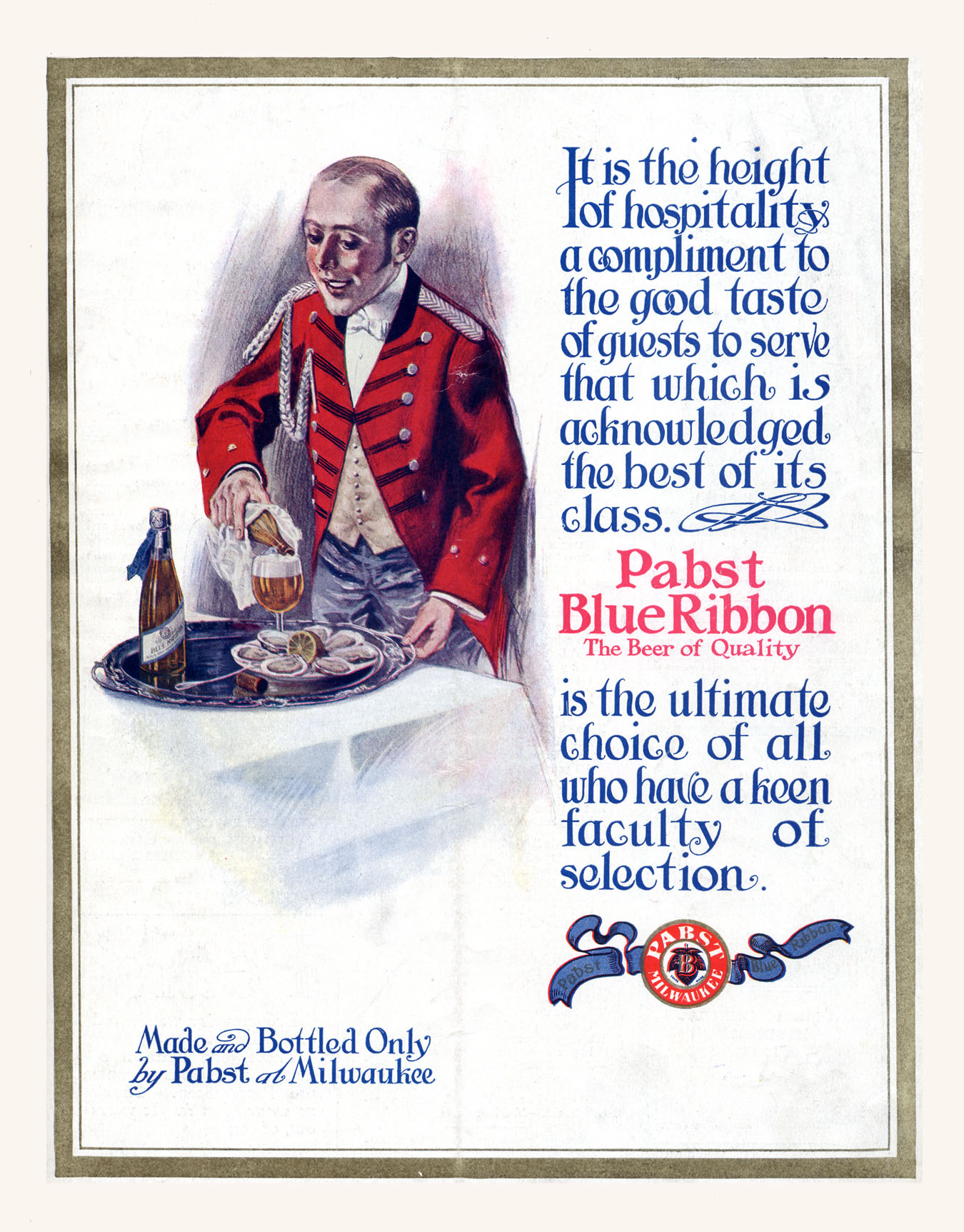
A 1911 advertisement showing a blue ribbon tied around the bottle

Sales of Pabst peaked at 18 million US bbl (2,100 million L) in 1977. In 1980 it was still third in sales in the U.S. Between 1980 and 1981 the company had four different CEOs, and by 1982 it slipped to fifth.

In 1996, Pabst headquarters left Milwaukee, and the company ended beer production at its main complex there. By 2001, the brand's sales were below a million US bbl (120 million L). That year, the company got a new CEO, Brian Kovalchuk, formerly the CFO of Benetton, and major changes at the company's marketing department were made.

In 2010, food industry executive C. Dean Metropoulos bought the company for a reported $250 million. In 2011, the U.S. Securities and Exchange Commission forced two advertising executives to cease efforts to raise $300 million to buy the Pabst Brewing Company. The two had raised over $200 million by crowdsourcing, collecting pledges via their website, Facebook, and Twitter. In November 2014, Eugene Kashper, an American beer entrepreneur, and TSG Consumer Partners acquired Pabst Brewing Company. In 2015, Pabst won the "best large brewing company of the year" award at the Great American Beer Festival.

Pabst Blue Ribbon is now available in several international markets, including Australia (where it is brewed locally), Canada, brewed locally by Sleeman Breweries Ukraine, Russia, Dominican Republic, Brazil and China.

On October 8, 2020, the San Antonio Economic Development Foundation announced that Pabst was moving its headquarters from Los Angeles to San Antonio, Texas.

After a brief return, in 2020, Pabst announced it was again leaving Milwaukee, the city where it was founded, with the closing of the Captain Pabst Pilot House, a taproom and microbrewery which the company had opened in 2017 as part of a redevelopment of its historic brewery in the city. The city's name continues to be a prominent part of its branding, despite it having no direct presence in or current impact on the area.

== Marketing ==
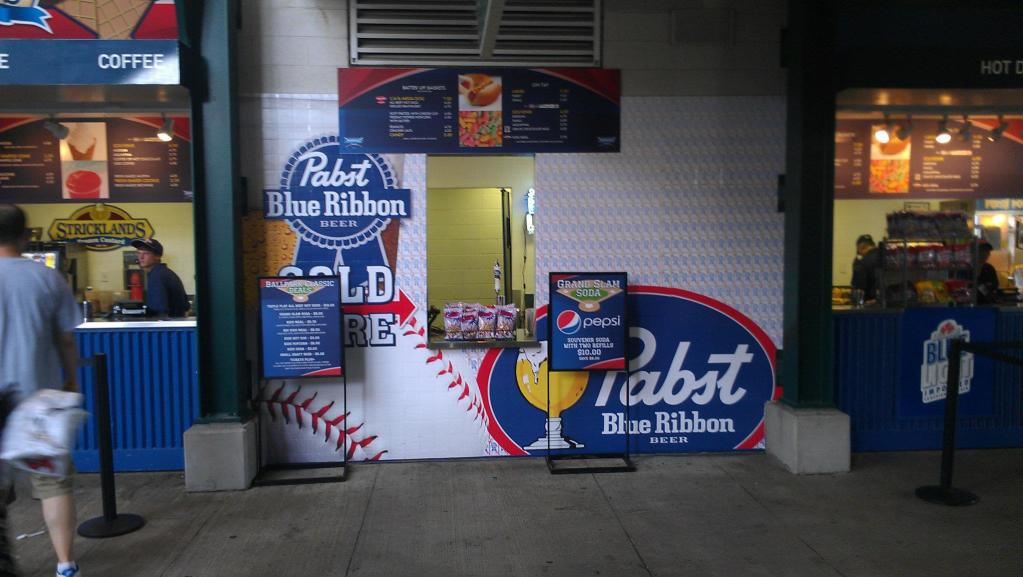
Pabst Blue Ribbon concession stand at Progressive Field in Cleveland

In the mid-1940s, the brand was the titular sponsor of the radio comedy show Blue Ribbon Town, starring Groucho Marx. Between 1946 and 1949, Pabst sponsored The Eddie Cantor Pabst Blue Ribbon Show. It later was a sponsor of the radio mystery show Night Beat in the early 1950s.

The beer experienced a sales revival in the early 2000s after a two-decade-long slump, largely due to its increasing popularity among urban hipsters. Although the Pabst website features user-submitted photography, much of which features twenty-something Pabst drinkers dressed in alternative fashions, the company has opted not to fully embrace the countercultural label in its marketing, fearing that doing so could jeopardize the very "authenticity" that made the brand popular (as was the case with the poorly received OK Soda). Pabst instead targets its desired market niche through the sponsorship of indie music, local businesses, post-collegiate sports teams, dive bars and radio programming like National Public Radio's All Things Considered. The company encourages the online submission of fan art, which is subsequently shown on the beer's official Facebook page.

Beginning in 2021, Pabst began supporting professional wrestling (in particular the independent circuit) after becoming a sponsor for Matt Cardona's podcast. It eventually led to the beer's first major television commercial in decades during the August 4, 2021, broadcast of AEW Dynamite, after it volunteered to step in to replace Domino's Pizza as a sponsor of All Elite Wrestling following backlash from Domino's when Nick Gage used a pizza cutter on Chris Jericho in a deathmatch on the previous week's Dynamite, with said spot immediately airing before a Domino's commercial.

In January 2022, the brand's Twitter account tweeted a number of questionable messages such as "Not drinking this January? Try eating ass!", a reference to Dry January. "Nothing pairs like PBR and Amyl Nitrate, ask Frank Booth!" and "Blue Ribbon Butseks for All!" The tweets and a number of follow-up replies were eventually deleted and the company released a statement apologizing for the incident. The brand manager who wrote the tweets was fired.

== Products ==
Pabst Blue Ribbon Original is the brand flagship and is brewed at 4.7% alcohol by volume. There is also Pabst Blue Ribbon Extra, which is described as a 6.5% ABV full-bodied lager. Pabst Light is the brand's light-style lager with lower calories and an ABV of 4.2%. The company also offers Pabst Blue Ribbon Non-Alc, a non-alcoholic beer brewed at less than 0.5% ABV.

== In popular culture ==
In 1973, American country music artist Johnny Russell recorded, "Rednecks, White Socks, and Blue Ribbon Beer," a song written by Bob McDill and Wayland Holyfield.

The 1986 movie Blue Velvet had Frank, the villain, shout "Fuck that [Heineken] shit. Pabst Blue Ribbon!"

In 1987, the Untamed Youth, a popular garage rock band from Columbia, Missouri, recorded "Pabst Blue Ribbon", a surf instrumental written by the band's guitarist, Deke Dickerson. When this song was performed live, members of the band would spray the crowd with PBR cans.

Australian Post-Hardcore band The Amity Affliction referenced Pabst Blue Ribbon in the title of their 2012 song "Pabst Blue Ribbon on Ice", from the album Chasing Ghosts.

In May 2016, WWE released a John Cena T-shirt that bears resemblance to and inspired by the Pabst Blue Ribbon can design. The Pabst Brewing Company threatened to sue Cena and the WWE for trademark infringement which drew criticism by wrestling fans and fellow personnel as a publicity stunt. While respecting intellectual property and denying any wrongdoing due to the fair use of its clothing design, WWE pulled the T-shirt from its WWE Shop website and released a modified design to the Cena “Pabst” T-shirt. However, the original “Pabst” T-shirt design was back on sale on WWE Shop a month later.

- The beer has appeared in the films Midnight Madness, Blue Velvet, Everything Must Go and Gran Torino, and in television shows such as AMC's Breaking Bad and South Park.
- The beer is referenced in the 2011 film Tucker & Dale vs. Evil.
- The beer is referenced in the title and lyrics of the 1973 country song Rednecks, White Socks and Blue Ribbon Beer by Johnny Russell.
- In the Mad Men season 2 episode, "The Mountain King", Don Draper drinks a Pabst Blue Ribbon from the bottle.
- In Supernatural season 2 episode, "Simon Said", Sam Winchester persuades Ash with a PBR.
- In South Park, Pabst Blue Ribbon is the beer preferred by character Randy Marsh. In "The Poor Kid," the narrator opines: "Pabst Blue Ribbon and white trash. It's a deadly combination that can lead to prison time and children being taken away from their homes."
- In Reno 911! season 4 episode 12, "Hodgepodge", Officer Jonson and Junior arrest a man who drank PBR because he is completely confused.
- Lana Del Rey mentions the brand in her songs "This is What Makes us Girls" and "Music To Watch Boys To."
- Brian Setzer song "Really Rockabilly" from the 13 album contains a line that refers to Pabst Blue Ribbon ("Drink Pabst Blue Ribbon/drive a rockabilly wreck")
- Australian Metalcore Band The Amity Affliction released a song on their 2012 album Chasing Ghosts which they named "Pabst Blue Ribbon on Ice".
- The Zac Brown Band references the brand in their song "Toes" on their 2008 album The Foundation.
- Jake Owen references Pabst Blue Ribbon in his song "Down to the Honkytonk" which contain the lyric, "I'm a local legend on a Friday night in a Pabst Blue Ribbon neon light".
- In the album, Heart to Heart by Betty Buckley, there is a song called "I Am a Town" (Carpenter) which contains the lyric, "I am Pabst Blue Ribbon America and Southern Serves the South".
- The song "Ruby Room" by Green Day side project Foxboro Hot Tubs alludes to the beer with the lyric: "Lucky Strike and I will travel, as the Pabst Blue Ribbon unravels."
- In the films National Lampoon's Christmas Vacation and Foxes, Randy Quaid's character is seen drinking a can of PBR.
- In The West Wing season four episode "Election Night", Charlie Young's Little Brother Anthony brings his friend Orlando Kettles to the White House, possibly hoping to get charges dropped after Orlando was caught driving with "an open can of Pabst."
- In the Timeless episode "The World's Columbian Exposition", a waitress serves Flynn and Lucy, "It's called Pabst? It just won a blue ribbon at the fair."
- The Boston Ska Band "Big D and the Kids Table" features numerous songs that include Pabst Blue Ribbon in their lyrics; including "Lynn Lynn The City Of Sin" and "Shining On".
- Macklemore's song "Cowboy Boots" includes the lyric "cowboy boots doing lines at the bar where the time goes slow when you're drinking PBR."
- The beer is referenced in the title and lyrics of the 2009 country song "Pabst Blue Ribbon", by Shane Yellowbird.
- Brad Pitt is seen drinking a PBR in the hit film Se7en.
- Ceann sing an entire song (Pabst Blue Ribbon) on their album Almost Irish
- PBR is referenced in Richard Barone's song "Can I Sleep on Your Futon", which was released on Occupy this Album.
- PBR is featured in the scenes of the beach restaurant and Bob Anderson's house in Christine (2016).

== Outside of the United States ==
Can of Pabst Blue Ribbon Beer sold in China

=== Australia ===
Dan Murphy's liquor stores have stocked the beer since 2012.

=== Canada ===
Pabst Blue Ribbon is brewed by Sleeman Breweries of Guelph, Ontario (although credited as 'Stroh Canada' on the labeling; Sleeman acquired the Stroh label in 1999). Pabst Blue Ribbon contains 4.9% alc/vol. There is also a Pabst strong beer which contains 5.9% alc/vol.

=== China ===
Pabst Blue Ribbon America has a licensing agreement and joint venture arrangement with China Pabst Blue Ribbon. It is produced, marketed and distributed by CBR Brewing Company, which jointly owns the company along with Guangdong Blue Ribbon Group under a sub-licensing agreement with the Pabst Brewing Company. CBR is a British Virgin Islands owned company but it is based in China. In 2010, China Pabst released a new beer called Pabst Blue Ribbon 1844 for consumption in the domestic market; it sells for 44 U.S. dollars a bottle.

=== Ireland ===
Pabst Blue Ribbon America has a licensing agreement and joint venture arrangement with C&C Group Plc and is being distributed in Republic of Ireland through C&C Gleeson and in Northern Ireland through Tennents Northern Ireland. It is sold in 355ml cans and bottles and on draught via a 30L keg. The ABV is 4.6%.

=== Sweden ===
Pabst Blue Ribbon launched in Sweden in 2012, imported by Galatea Beer Spirits & Wine and sold in Systembolaget stores. The Pabst Blue Ribbon sold in Sweden is labeled as the "export" version. According to Galatea it is an "extra flavorful version brewed for the Swedish market", and contains 4.5% alc/vol. Pabst Blue Ribbon export is brewed and bottled in America and then shipped to Sweden.
