= Rudolph J. Nunnemacher =

American businessman

Rudolph J. Nunnemacher (February 26, 1872 – January 29, 1900) was an American businessman who served as the director of the brewery Pabst Brewing Company.

Nunnemacher's father, Jacob Nunnemacher, immigrated from Switzerland to Milwaukee, Wisconsin in 1842 and operated a distillery. Nunnemacher had four siblings: Herman, Jacob, Robert, and Marie.

On June 22, 1897, Nunnemacher married Emma Pabst, the daughter of Captain Frederick Pabst. He directed Pabst Brewing Company from 1899 to 1900.

He willed his collections to the Milwaukee Public Museum, encompassing nearly 2,000 items, including housewares and paintings from all over the world. The Rudolph J. Nunnemacher Collection of Projectile Arms at the Smithsonian Library and Archives and the Nunnemacher Decorative Arts Collection have since expanded through donations.
