= Hawaii Nui Brewing Company =

American brewing company

Coordinates: 19°42′21″N 155°4′9″W

Hawaiʻi Nui Brewing Company is a brewery in Hilo on the Island of Hawaii, Hawaii, United States. It was established in 2007 by Keith Kinsey, Andrew Baker and Nina Lytton. Hawai'i Nui Brewing acquired Keoki Brewing Company in May 2007. In January 2009, Hawaii Nui Brewing acquired Mehana Brewing Company and consolidated operations to Hilo, Hawai'i. It sells Hawaiʻi Nui, Keoki and Mehana labels of beers.

Keoki Brewing Company was located in Līhuʻe on the island of Kauaʻi, and made Primo Island Lager draught beer under license from Pabst Brewing Company from October 2007 until November 2010.

Mehana Brewing Company was incorporated in 1995 by Dustin Shindo with Calvin Shindo general manager. The Shindo family had previously operated a soft drink company. It has a tasting room located on East Kawili Street in Hilo.

In April 2013, Hawai'i Nui Brewing applied for Chapter 11 bankruptcy reorganization.

== See also ==
- List of breweries in Hawaii
