= China Pabst Blue Ribbon =

Chinese brand of beer

China Pabst Blue Ribbon 蓝带啤酒 Lán dài píjiǔ
- Pabst Blue Ribbon Beer as sold in the PRC in 2017.
- Location: Zhaoqing, Guangdong, China
- Opened: 1987
- Website: www.blueribbon.com.cn

China Pabst Blue Ribbon (Chinese: 蓝带啤酒; pinyin: Lán dài píjiǔ) is a brand of beer sold in China. It is produced, marketed and distributed by CBR Brewing Company, Inc., which is a Virgin Islands-owned holding company located in Hong Kong. It jointly owns the brand and breweries along with Guangdong Blue Ribbon Group under a sub-licensing agreement with the Pabst Brewing Company.

According to a Bloomberg Businessweek profile, the CBR Brewing Co. was established in 1988.

China Pabst beer was first produced in China under the Pabst trademark in Zhaoqing Brewery located in Zhaoqing, Guangdong. The brewery itself is located in the suburbs between the streets of Ban Yue road, Kangle North road and Cui Xing road. Its exact geolocation is labeled as Blueribbon beer on the Google map of Zhaoqing. The beer is now produced in three other breweries in other parts of China as well and it is uncertain as to whether the Zhaoqing brewery remains the main location for brewing. The cooperation between the two sides started with Pabst selling three previously mothballed breweries to their future partners in China.

As of 1999, the Zhaoqing brewery offered free tours of the inside of the brewery including the bottling area, brewery outside grounds and the actual beer making facilities. The brewery also offered beer tastings at that time.

Unlike the American version of Pabst Blue Ribbon, China Pabst has sought to position itself as a luxury brand, with bottles of its 1844 branded beer costing $44 (by 2018 standards).

== Gallery ==
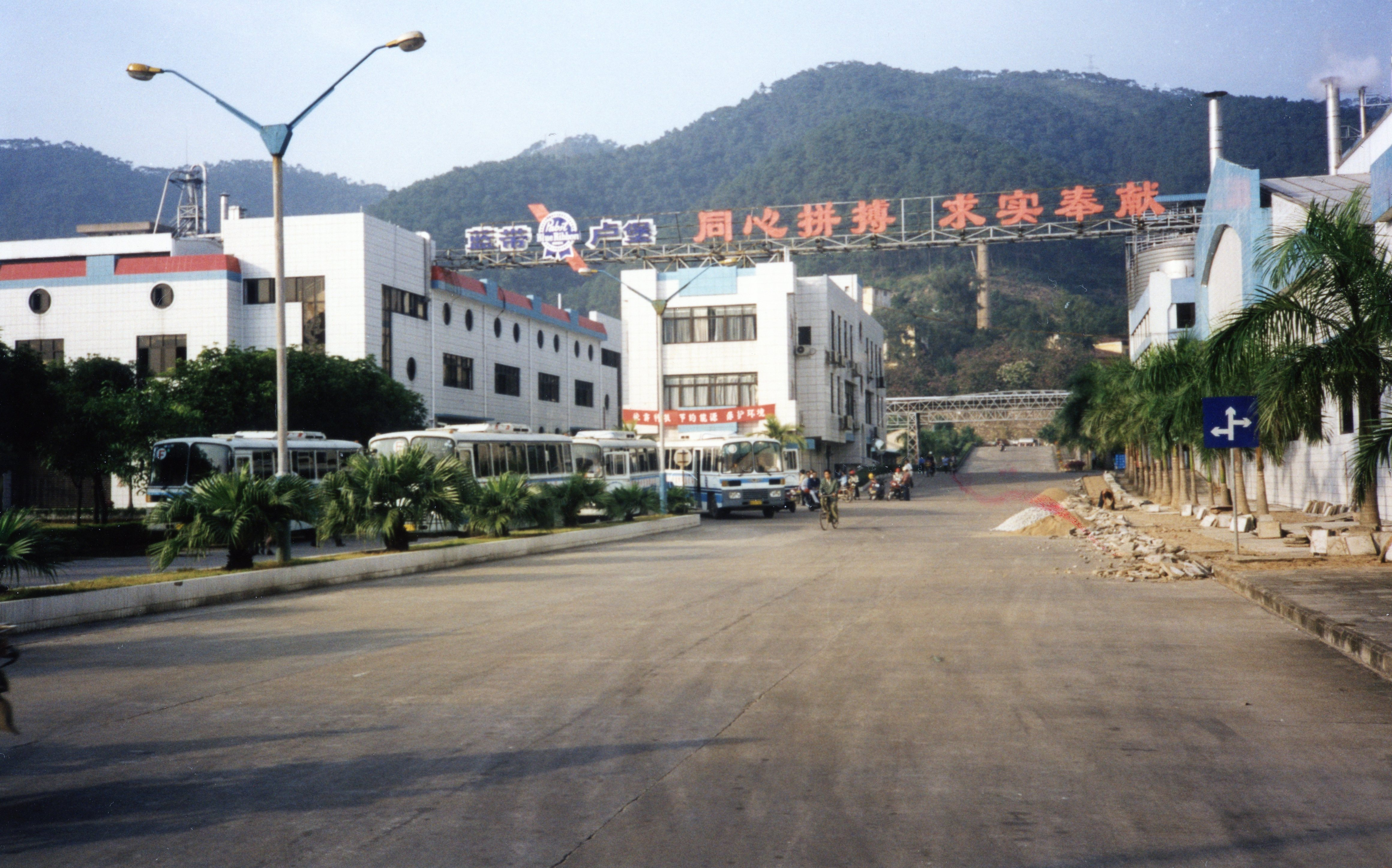
Front gate of Zhaoqing Brewery 1999

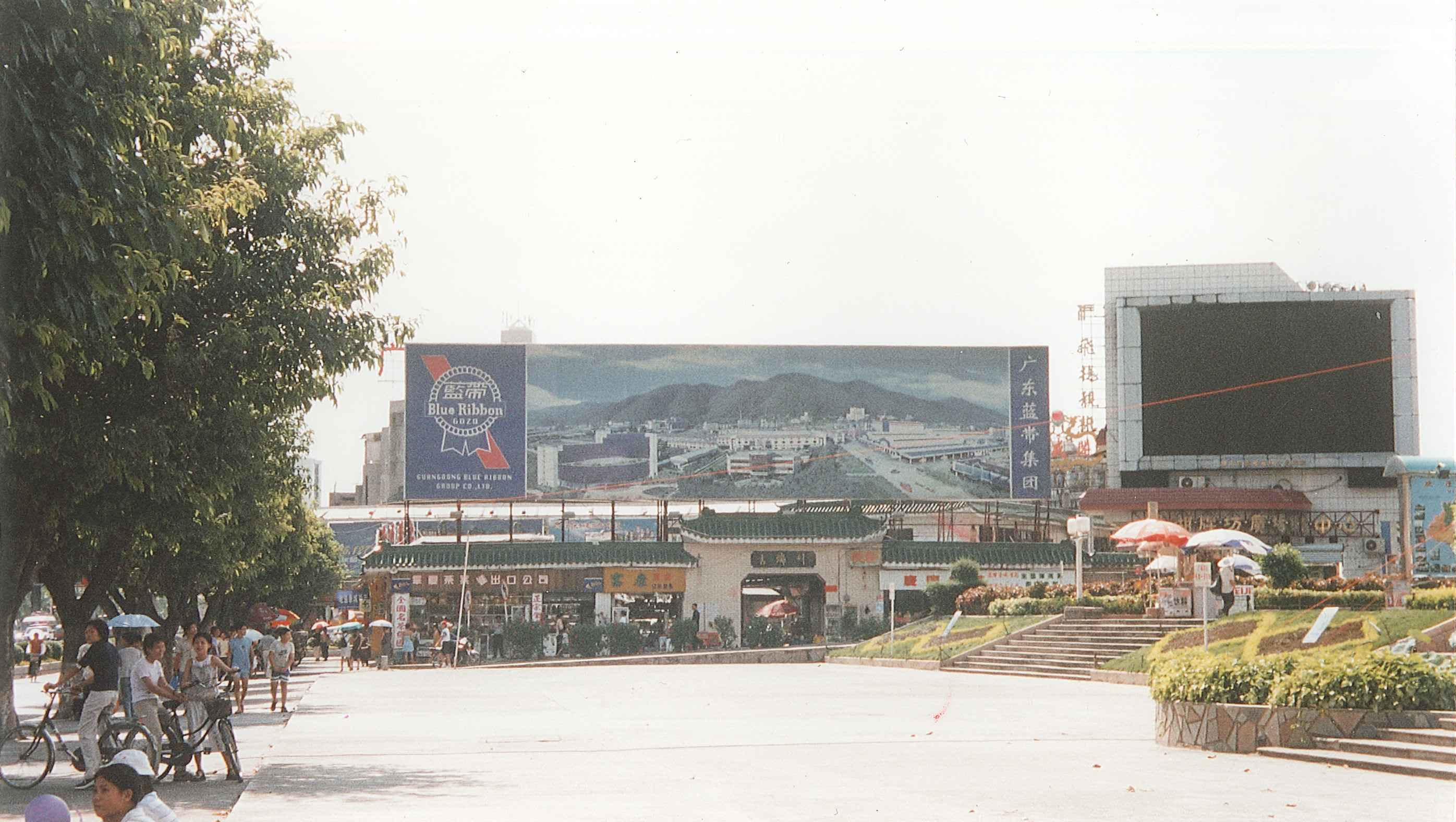
Billboard for Pabst Blue Ribbon Beer in Zhaoqing, Guangdong China 1999

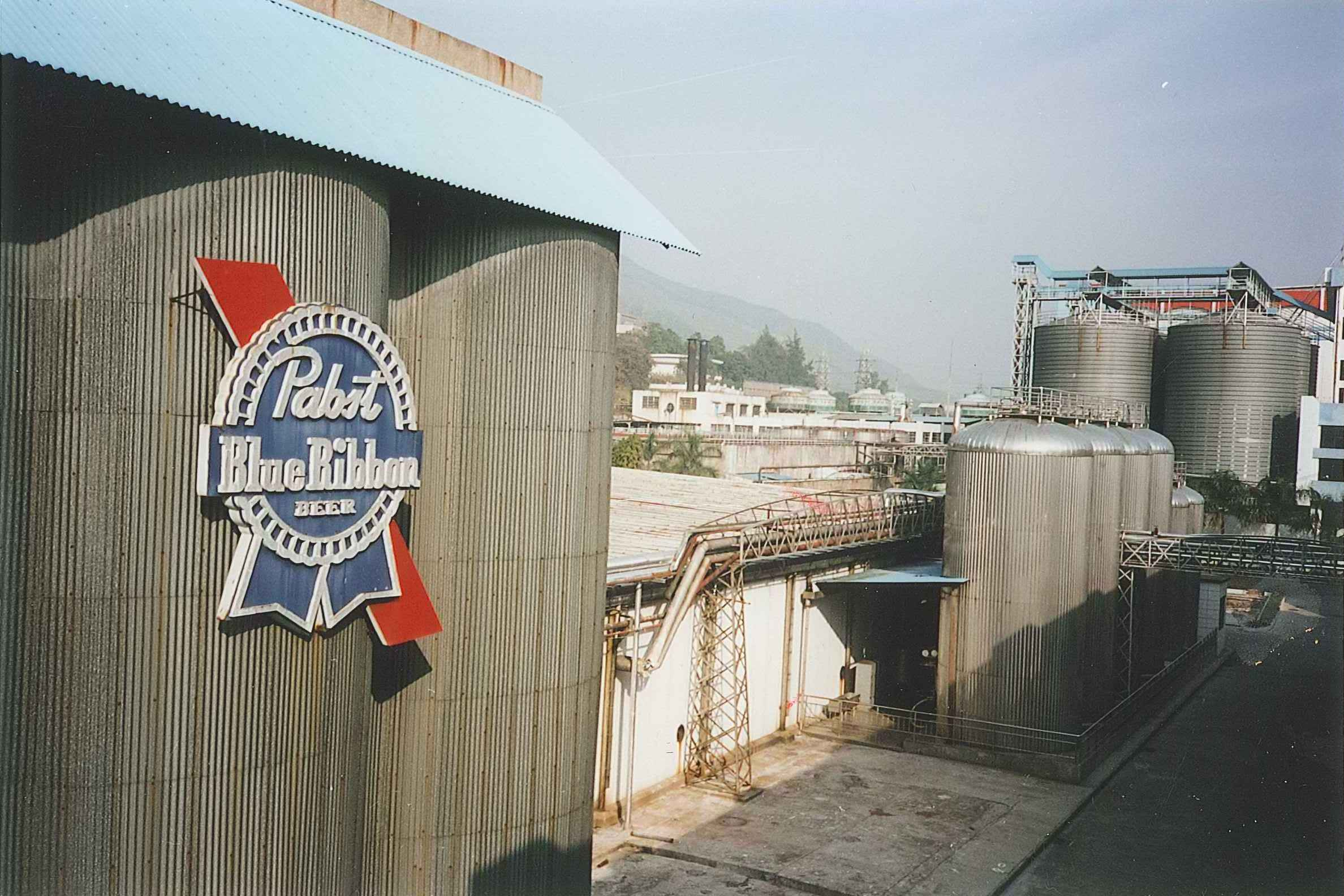
Pabst sign hanging on beer storage tank in Zhaoqing Brewery 1999

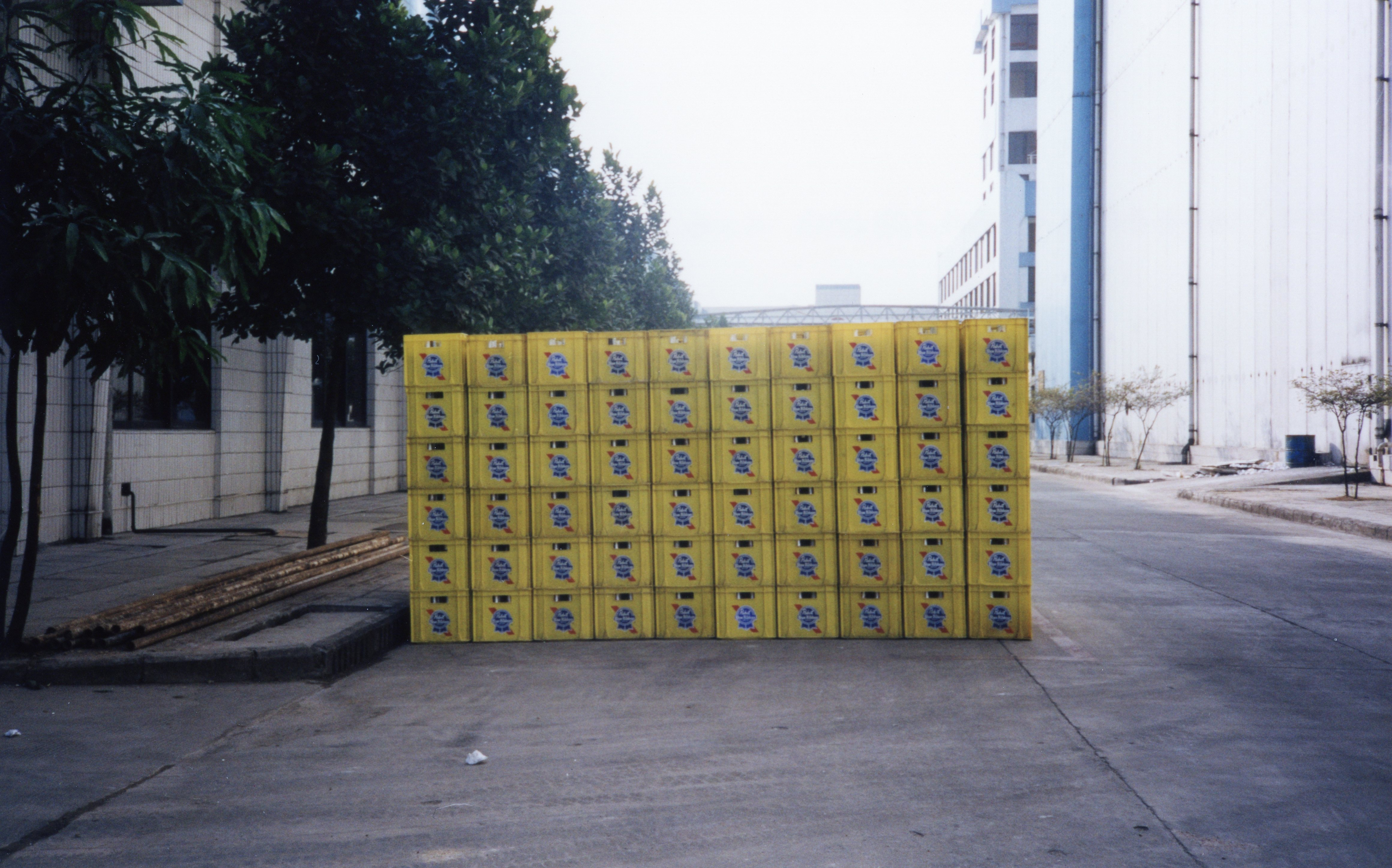
Stacks of beer at Zhaoqing Brewery 1999

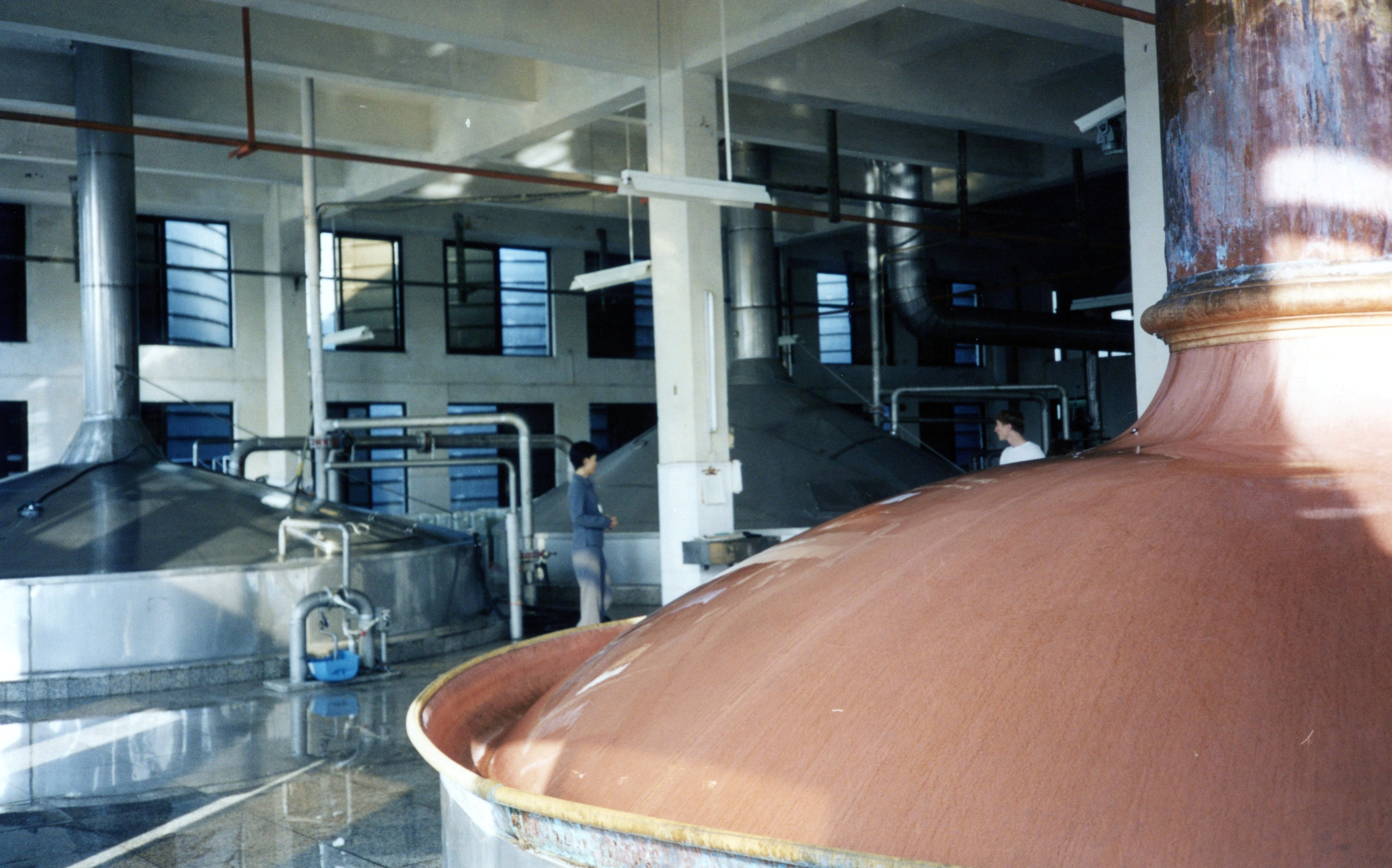
Beer making vats in Zhaoqing Brewery 1999

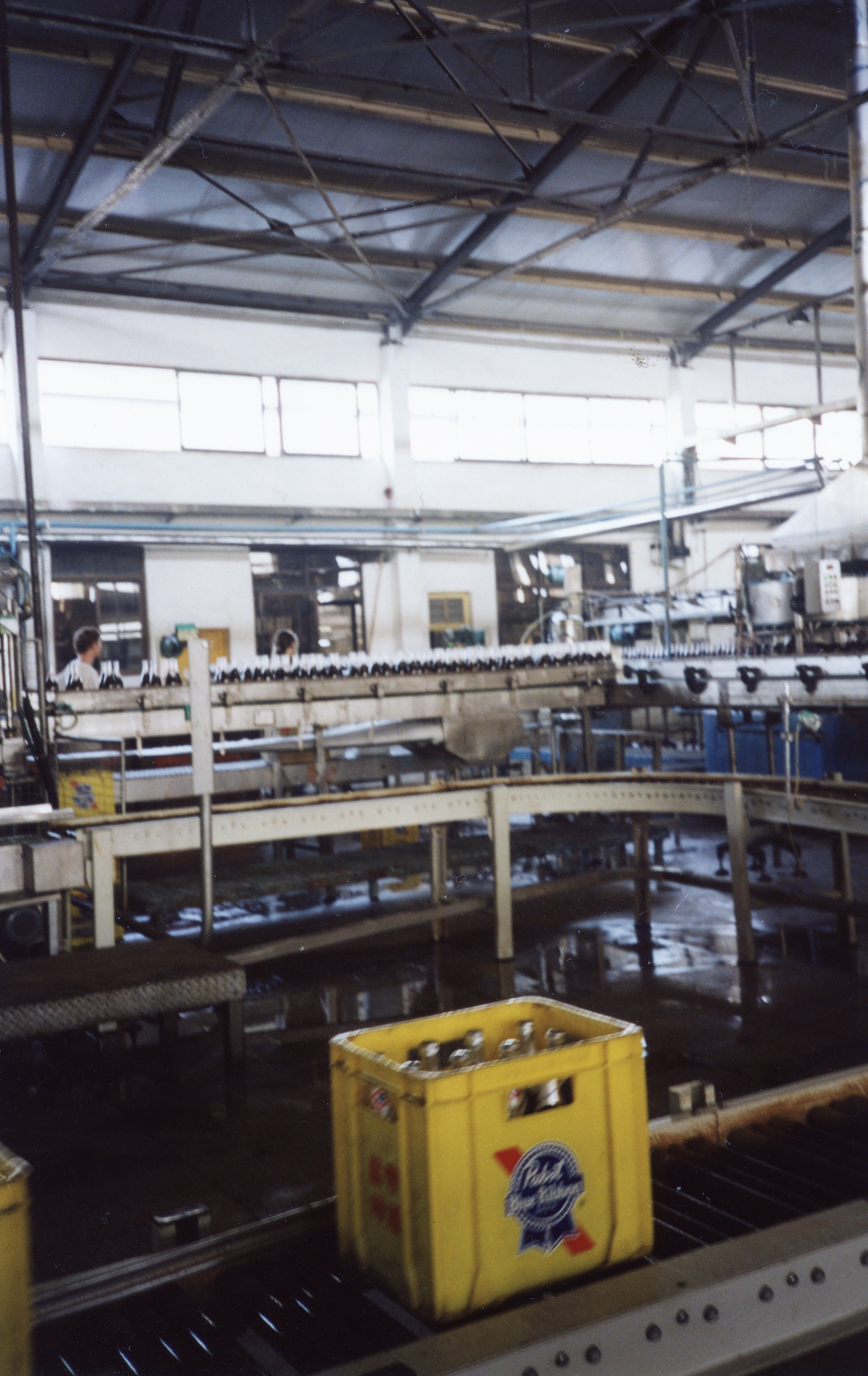
Beer rolling down the line at Zhaoqing Brewery 1999

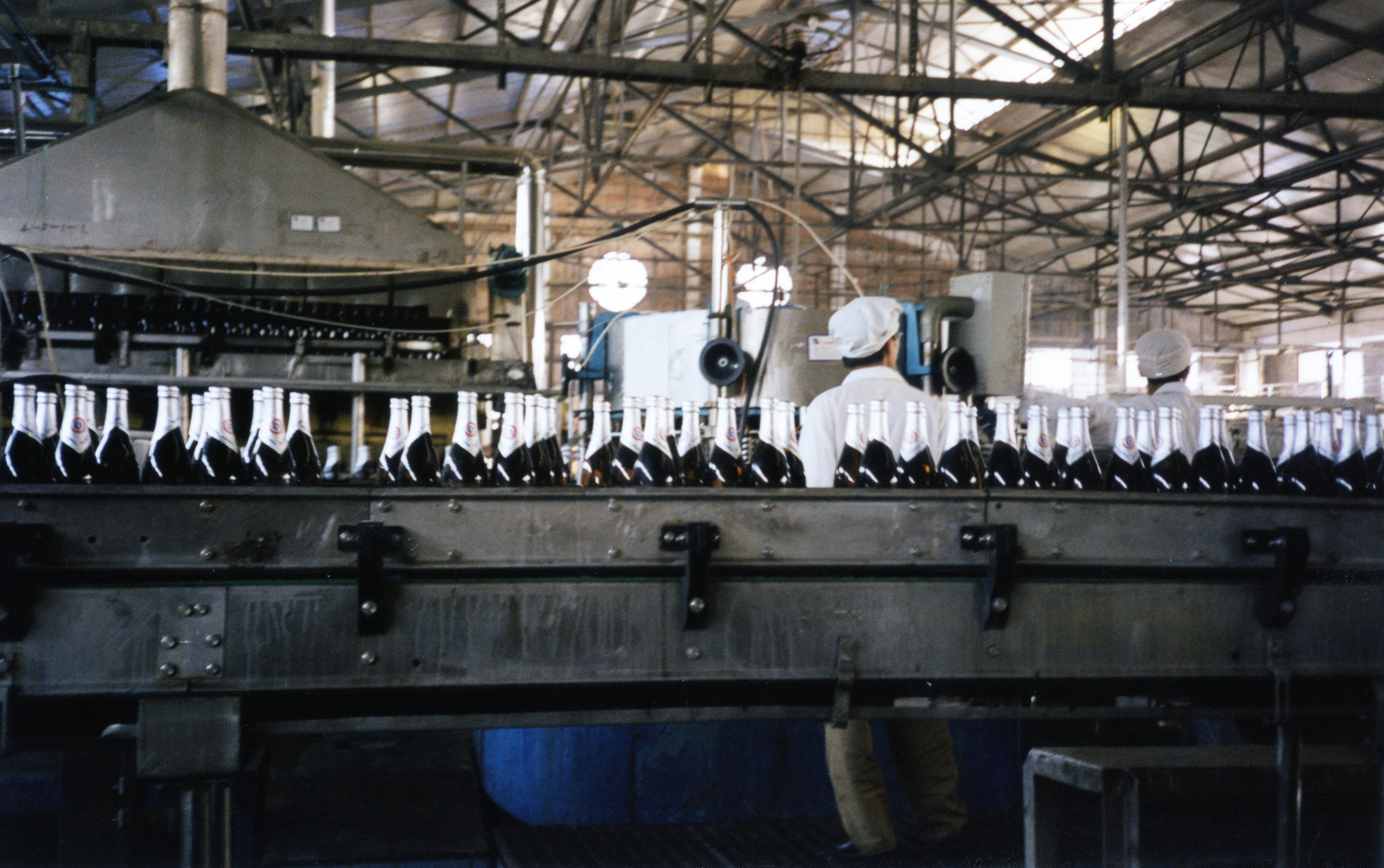
Zhaoqing Brewery bottling line 1999

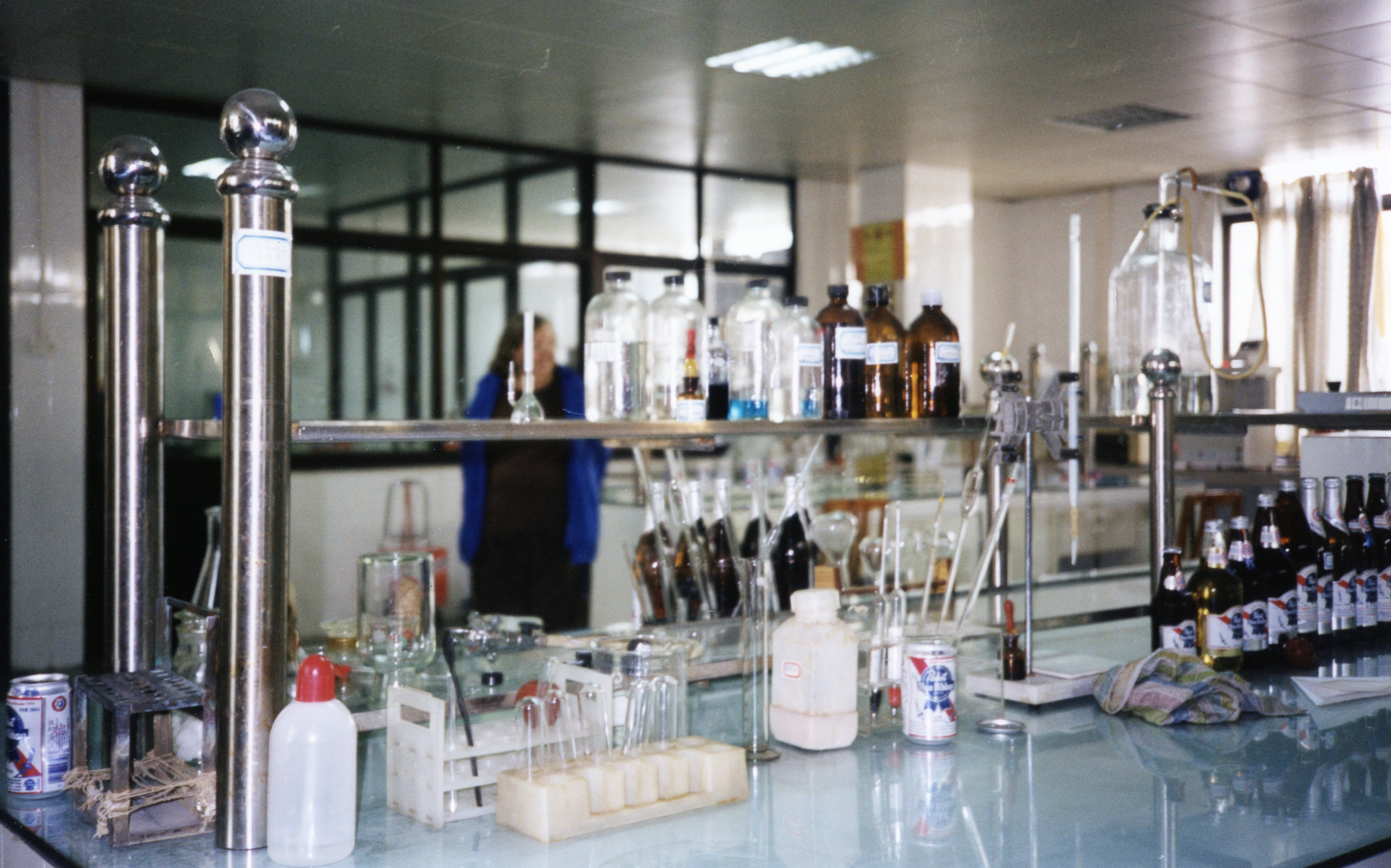
Zhaoqing Brewery beer laboratory 1999

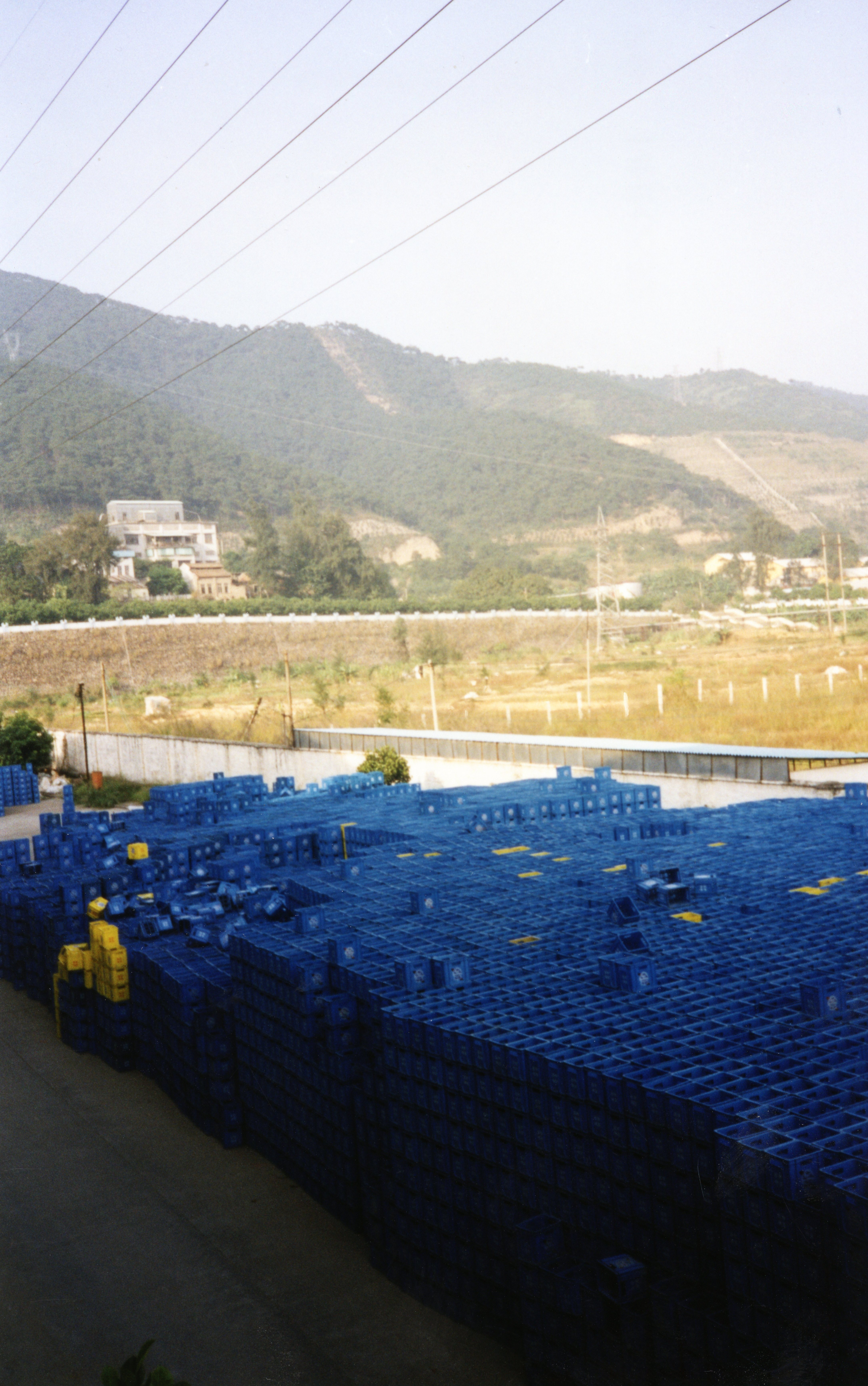
Zhaoqing Brewery beer containers 1999
