= Jacob Best =

German-American brewer

- Born: May 1, 1786; Mettenheim, Landgraviate of Hesse-Darmstadt
- Died: January 26, 1861 (aged 74); Milwaukee, Wisconsin, US
- Resting place: Forest Home Cemetery
- Known for: Pabst Brewing Company

Jacob Best Sr. (May 1, 1786 – January 26, 1861) was a German-American brewer who founded what would later become known as the Pabst Brewing Company in Milwaukee, Wisconsin.

== Life and career ==
Best was born in Hesse-Darmstadt, where he learned the trade and ran a small brewery in Mettenheim, Rhenish Hesse, until immigrating to the US in 1844 to join his sons.

In Milwaukee, Jacob Best founded Empire Brewery on Chestnut Street Hill, which he ran with his sons, Phillip, Jacob Jr., Charles, and Lorenz. Charles and Lorenz soon withdrew from the company, with Charles establishing the Plank Road Brewery (now the Miller Brewing Company). His daughter Margaretha married Moritz Schoeffler, a prominent newspaper editor who founded The Wisconsin Banner. Empire Brewery produced 300 barrels in its first year.

After Jacob Sr. retired in 1853, Phillip and Jacob Jr. continued operations as a partnership. The Best brewery was renamed Phillip Best Brewery. Phillip's sons-in-law, Emil Schandein and Captain Frederick Pabst, later bought the brewery from Phillip. When Emil died, his wife Lisette Best became vice president. By 1874, Phillip Best Brewing Co. was the nation's largest brewer, supplying Chicago after the Great Chicago Fire. The brewery was renamed Pabst Brewing Company and remained at the same location along Chestnut Street (now Juneau Avenue) until closure of the complex in 1997.

Jacob Best Sr. devoted the remainder of his life to local politics.

== See also ==
- Eberhard Anheuser
- Valentin Blatz
- Adolphus Busch
- Adolph Coors
- Gottlieb Heileman
- Frederick Miller
- Frederick Pabst
- Joseph Schlitz
- August Uihlein
