= List of breweries in Hawaii =

Breweries in Hawaii produce a wide range of beers in different styles that are marketed locally, regionally, and nationally.

In 2012, Hawaii's 11 breweries and brewpubs employed 180 people directly, and more than 5,500 others in related jobs such as wholesaling and retailing. Including people directly employed in brewing, as well as those who supply Hawaii's breweries with everything from ingredients to machinery, the total business and personal tax revenue generated by Hawaii's breweries and related industries was more than $128 million. Consumer purchases of Hawaii's brewery products generated almost $65 million extra in tax revenue. In 2012, according to the Brewers Association, Hawaii ranked 27th in the number of craft breweries per capita with 10.

For context, at the end of 2013, 2,822 breweries were in the United States, including 2,768 craft breweries subdivided into 1,237 brewpubs, 1,412 microbreweries, and 119 regional craft breweries. In that same year, according to the Beer Institute, the brewing industry employed around 43,000 Americans in brewing and distribution and had a combined economic impact of more than $246 billion.

== Breweries ==
Name	Location	Island	Founded	Notes
Big Island Brewhaus	Waimea	Hawai‘i	2011	
Kalihi Beer	Kalihi, Honolulu	Oahu	2025	Kalihi’s first beer brewery in 127 years - Formerly known as Broken Boundary Brewery
Waikiki Brewing Company	Waikīkī, Honolulu	Oahu	2015	
Stewbum & Stonewall Brewing Co.	Kāneohe	Oahu		
Maui Brewing Company	Kihei	Maui	2005	The Lāhainā no longer produces as of 2016; all production is currently out of the Kihei location. Lāhainā has a full restaurant as does the Kihei location. MBC opened a Honolulu location on January 31, 2017 and a Kailua location in February 2019
Lanikai Brewing Co	Kailua	Oahu		
Kona Brewing Company	Kailua-Kona	Hawai‘i		A pub is also located in Hawai‘i Kai, Oahu. All draft beer served in Hawai‘i is brewed in Kona.
Koholā Brewery	Lāhainā	Maui		All beers are brewed and packaged on Maui.Located in the former Maui Brewing location.
Kauai Island Brewery & Grill	Port Allen	Kauai		
Honolulu Beerworks	Kaka‘ako, Honolulu	Oahu		
Kauai Beer Company	Lihue	Kauai		
Hawaii Nui Brewing Company	Hilo	Hawai‘i		Combined with Mehana Brewing
Beer Lab HI	Mō‘ili‘ili, Honolulu	Oahu		
Aloha Beer Company	Kaka‘ako, Honolulu	Oahu		Opened on January 19, 2017.
Primo Brewing & Malting Company		Kauai		Bottled Primo is imported from California and draft Primo in Hawai‘i was being made on Kauai, but with no recent reference as to who brews it currently.
Home of the Brave Beverage Co	Kaka‘ako, Honolulu	Oahu		
Hana Koa Brewing Co.	Kaka‘ako, Honolulu	Oahu		
Mahalo Aleworks	Makawao	Maui		First Maui brewery to open Upcountry. Opened 2021.

Defunct breweries:

- Hilo Brewing Company - Hilo
- Hoku Brewing Company – Honolulu

== See also ==
- Beer in the United States
- List of breweries in the United States
- List of microbreweries
