= Frederick Pabst =

German-American brewer (1836–1904)

Johann Gottlieb Friedrich Pabst
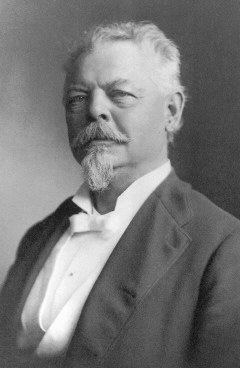
- Born: 28 March 1836; Nikolausrieth, Province of Saxony, Kingdom of Prussia
- Died: 1 January 1904 (aged 67); Milwaukee, Wisconsin, U.S.
- Occupations: Brewer, businessman
- Known for: Founding the Pabst Brewing Company
- Spouse: Maria Best (m. 1862)
- Children: 10

Johann Gottlieb Friedrich "Frederick" Pabst (March 28, 1836 – January 1, 1904) was a German-American ship's captain and brewer and the namesake of the Pabst Brewing Company. Pabst was born in Prussia and emigrated to the United States with his parents when he was 12. He became a ship's captain and married Maria Best, daughter of a small brewery owner, Jacob Best. After a shipping accident, Pabst bought into his father-in-law's brewery company, learned the business, increased output, and helped the brewery to go public, after which he became president of the company in 1873. The company's name was later changed to the Pabst Brewing Company. Pabst also developed a popular resort north of Milwaukee, built the 14-story Pabst Building in downtown Milwaukee, helped organize the Wisconsin National Bank, and built Milwaukee's Pabst Theater.

== Biography ==
=== Early life ===
Pabst was born on March 28, 1836, in the village of Nikolausrieth, in the Province of Saxony, in the Kingdom of Prussia. Friedrich was the second child of Gottlieb Pabst, a local farmer, and his wife, Johanna Friederike.

In 1848, he immigrated with his parents to the United States, settling first in Milwaukee, and then Chicago. The following year, his mother died in a cholera epidemic. In Chicago, Frederick and his father had to eke out a living; for a while they worked as waiters and busboys. Frederick soon gave this up, however – because he had enjoyed his voyage to America, he decided to become a cabin boy on a Lake Michigan steamer. By the time he was 21, Pabst had earned his pilot's license, and was captain of one of these vessels. In this capacity, he met Phillip Best, the owner of a small but prosperous brewery founded by his father, Jacob Best, in 1844 in Milwaukee. Pabst married Best's daughter, Maria, on March 25, 1862.

For the next year and a half, Pabst continued to ply the waters of Lake Michigan as a ship's captain, until an accident in December 1863 led to a change in career. While trying to bring his craft into Milwaukee harbor, Pabst's ship ran aground. A short while later, Pabst purchased half of Best's brewing company.

=== Brewing ===
In 1864, when Pabst was taken into partnership in his father-in-law's brewery, he began to study the details of the business. After obtaining a thorough mastery of the art of brewing, Pabst turned his attention to extending the market for the beer, and before long, had raised the output of the Best brewery to 100,000 barrels a year. The brewery was eventually converted into a public company and its capital repeatedly increased to cope with the continually increasing trade. He became president of the corporation in 1873. Later, the brewing company's name was changed to the Pabst Brewing Company.

In 1889, Pabst spent $30,000 to take advantage of prime shoreline along Whitefish Bay, Wisconsin's unique location, just north of the city of Milwaukee, by developing a popular lakeshore resort, which he called the Pabst Whitefish Bay Resort.

As many as 10,000 visitors came to the resort on a summer day by horse and buggy, railroad, trolley, or excursion steamer, to enjoy the scenic view, to ride the Ferris wheel, attend daily concerts (double concerts on Sunday), rent row boats, watch outdoor movies, drink Pabst's beer, and dine on fine fare, including five types of whitefish netted daily in the adjoining bay. The resort's popularity faded in 1914 at the start of World War I and the park was closed. In 1915, the land was subdivided into residential lots.

The brewing company's renowned "Blue Ribbon" label was introduced in the 1890s. The beer never actually won a blue ribbon. During some festivals (e.g., World's Fair in Chicago), Pabst placed a blue ribbon around his Best beer (named after founder Phillip Best), so it would stand out among the others. People would start identifying the beer as the Pabst Blue Ribbon beer. Instead of correcting the public, Pabst just wisely renamed it. He trademarked the Blue Ribbon in 1900.

Pabst built a 14-story Pabst Building in downtown Milwaukee and also helped organize the Wisconsin National Bank, in 1893. Pabst purchased the old Nunnemacher Grand Opera House, located opposite the Milwaukee City Hall, in 1890, and turned it into the Das Neue Deutsche Stadt-Theater (The New German City Theater), but it was destroyed in a fire. Pabst ordered it rebuilt at once and the newly named Pabst Theater opened in 1895. It still is in use today.

The Pabst Mansion along Wisconsin Avenue is a well-known Milwaukee tourist attraction and was the Pabst family home from 1892 to 1908.

=== Personal life ===
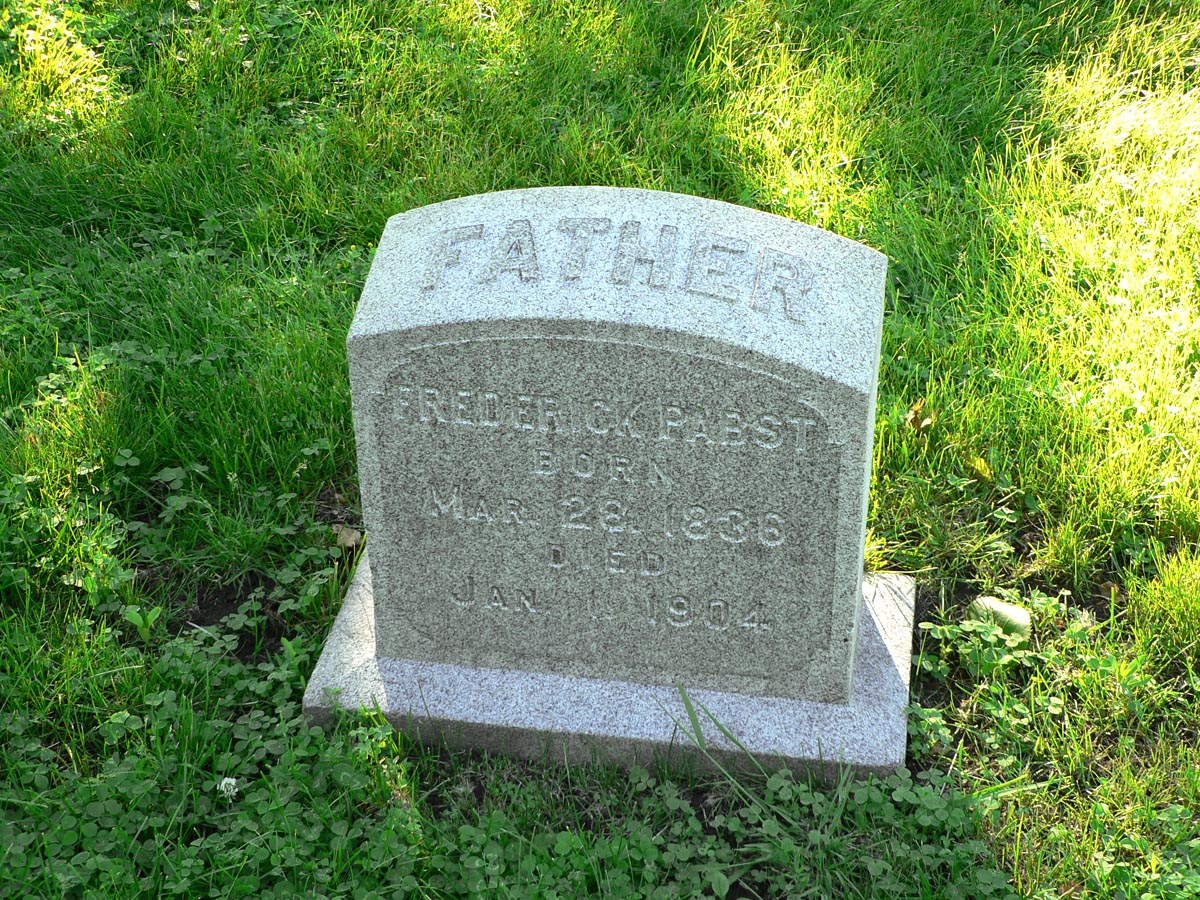
Tombstone in Forest Home Cemetery

Pabst was married in 1862 and had 10 children. Five survived to adulthood: Elizabeth (von Ernst, 1865–1891), Gustave (1866–1943), Marie (Goodrich, 1868–1947), Frederick Jr. (1869–1958), and Emma (Nunnemacher, 1871–1943). Emma was married to Rudolph J. Nunnemacher, a businessman whose collections are held by the Smithsonian Libraries and Archives. The Pabsts also adopted Elizabeth's daughter, Elsbeth, after Elizabeth died unexpectedly in 1891.

He had two stock farms, one in Wauwatosa and one in Calhoun for raising Percheron horses. The original stock had been imported by him from France.

Pabst was affiliated with Aurora Masonic Lodge No. 30.

Pabst is buried at Forest Home Cemetery in Milwaukee. He died of a heart attack on January 1, 1904 In Wisconsin at age 65.

== See also ==
- Eberhard Anheuser
- Jacob Best
- Valentin Blatz
- Adolphus Busch
- Adolph Coors
- Gottlieb Heileman
- Frederick Miller
- Joseph Schlitz
- August Uihlein
