= Primo Brewing & Malting Company =

Brewing company based in Honolulu, Hawaii

Primo Brewing Company
- Industry: Alcoholic beverage
- Founded: 1897 in Honolulu, Hawaiʻi, United States
- Headquarters: Los Angeles, CA
- Products: Beer
- Owner: Pabst Brewing Company
- Website: primobeer.com

Primo Brewing Company is a Honolulu-based beer brewing company. The company claims the title "Hawai’i’s original beer". The brand is currently owned and operated by Pabst Brewing Company.

== History ==
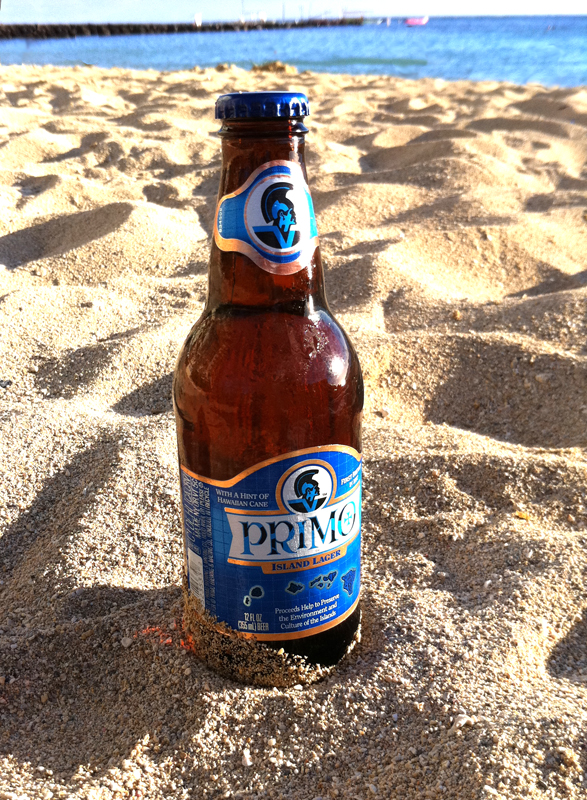
Primo 12-oz bottle at Kaimana Beach, Oahu

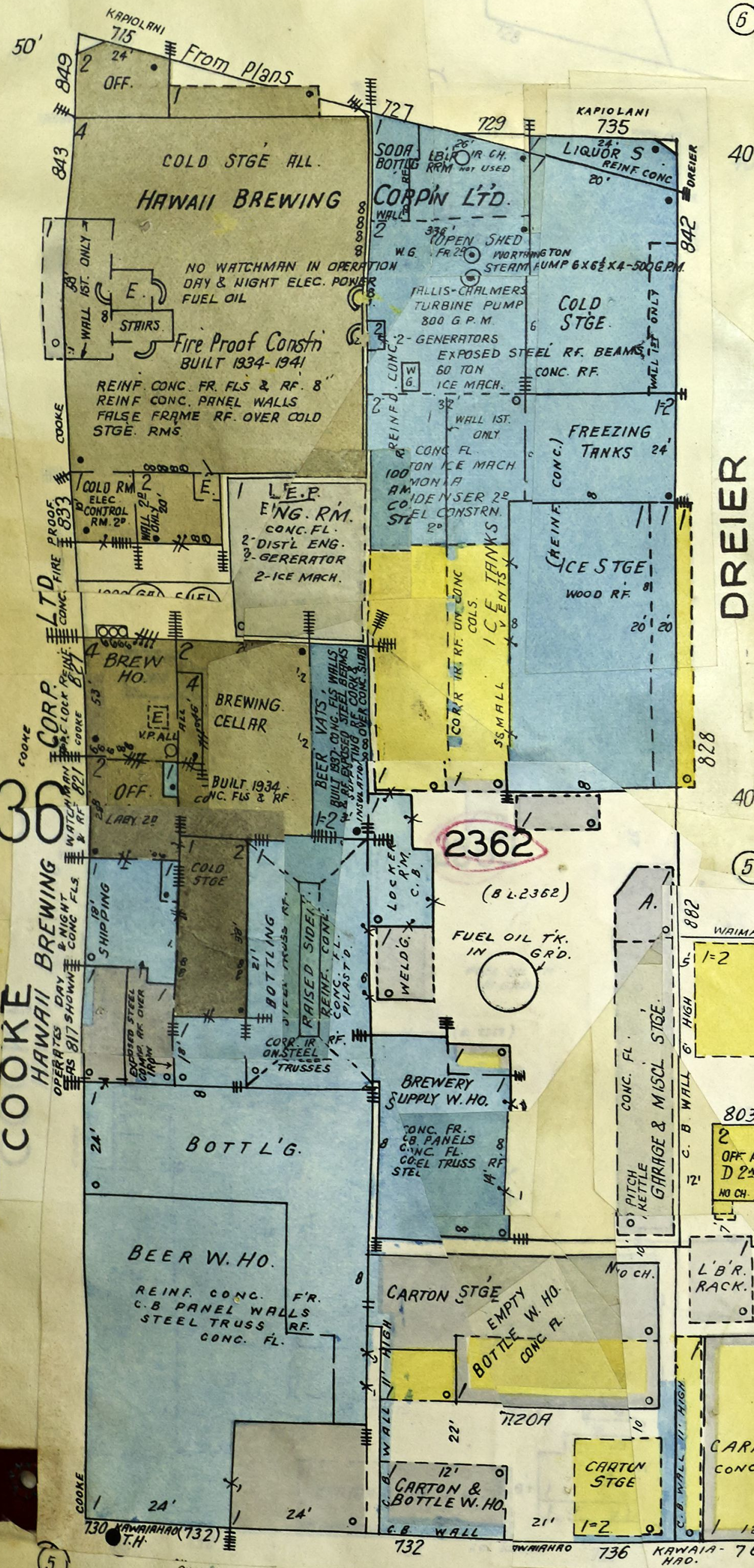
Hawaii Brewing Corporation Limited in 1950 (between Kapiolani Blvd. and Kawaiahao St.) from Sanborn fire insurance map of Honolulu

Around 1897 or 1898, the Honolulu Brewing & Malting Company was formed by Honolulu industrialist Alfred Hocking, launching the Primo lager brand in 1901. From 1920 to 1933, Prohibition caused Primo to halt operations. Other important milestones include:

- 1933: After Prohibition, Primo reopened under ownership of Hawaii Brewing Corporation.
- 1963: Schlitz Brewing Company acquired Primo.
- 1966: Schlitz built a new brewery for Primo and other brands in Aiea on Oahu.
- 1979: Schlitz closed the Aiea brewery and moved production to Los Angeles, California.
- 1982: Stroh Brewery Company acquired Primo when it bought Schlitz Brewing.
- 1985: Stroh changed Primo from brown bottles to green ones.
- 1990: The company returned to brown bottles.
- 1997: Stroh discontinued Primo beer.
- 1999: Pabst Brewing Company acquired the Primo brand when it purchased assets held by Stroh.
- 2007: Pabst brought back the Primo Beer brand.

Primo and its parent company revitalized its distribution and marketing since 2007, reviving the iconic island brand. Primo is a key sponsor at many watersport events such as surf contests, and appears in many bars and stores throughout the state of Hawaii. Although the front office is located in Honolulu, the main Pabst headquarters is in Los Angeles.

In May 2007, Keoki Brewing Company was bought by Hawaii Nui Brewing Company. Portions of the island-based proceeds go to the Outrigger Duke Kahanamoku Foundation and toward preserving Hawaiian culture, land, and heritage.

== In popular culture ==
Hawaiian comedian Frank De Lima mentions Primo beer twice in the "Solid Mold" segment of his 1982 comedy record Please Buy This Album!

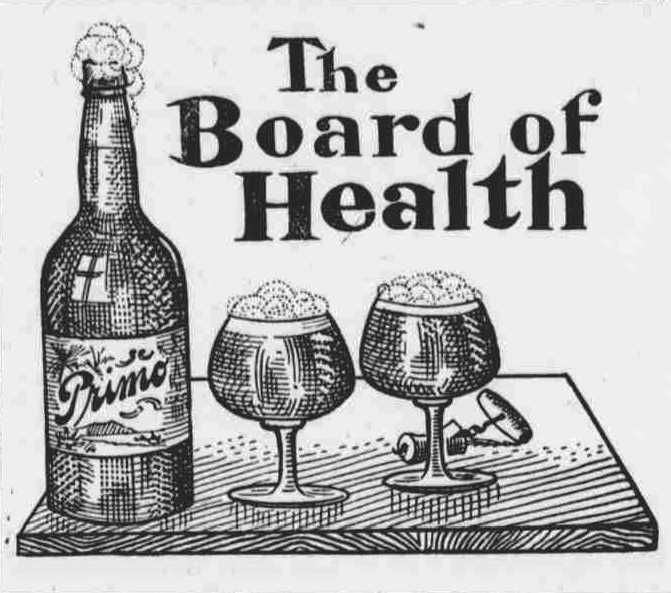
A 1904 advertisement for Primo Beer in the Hilo Tribune newspaper

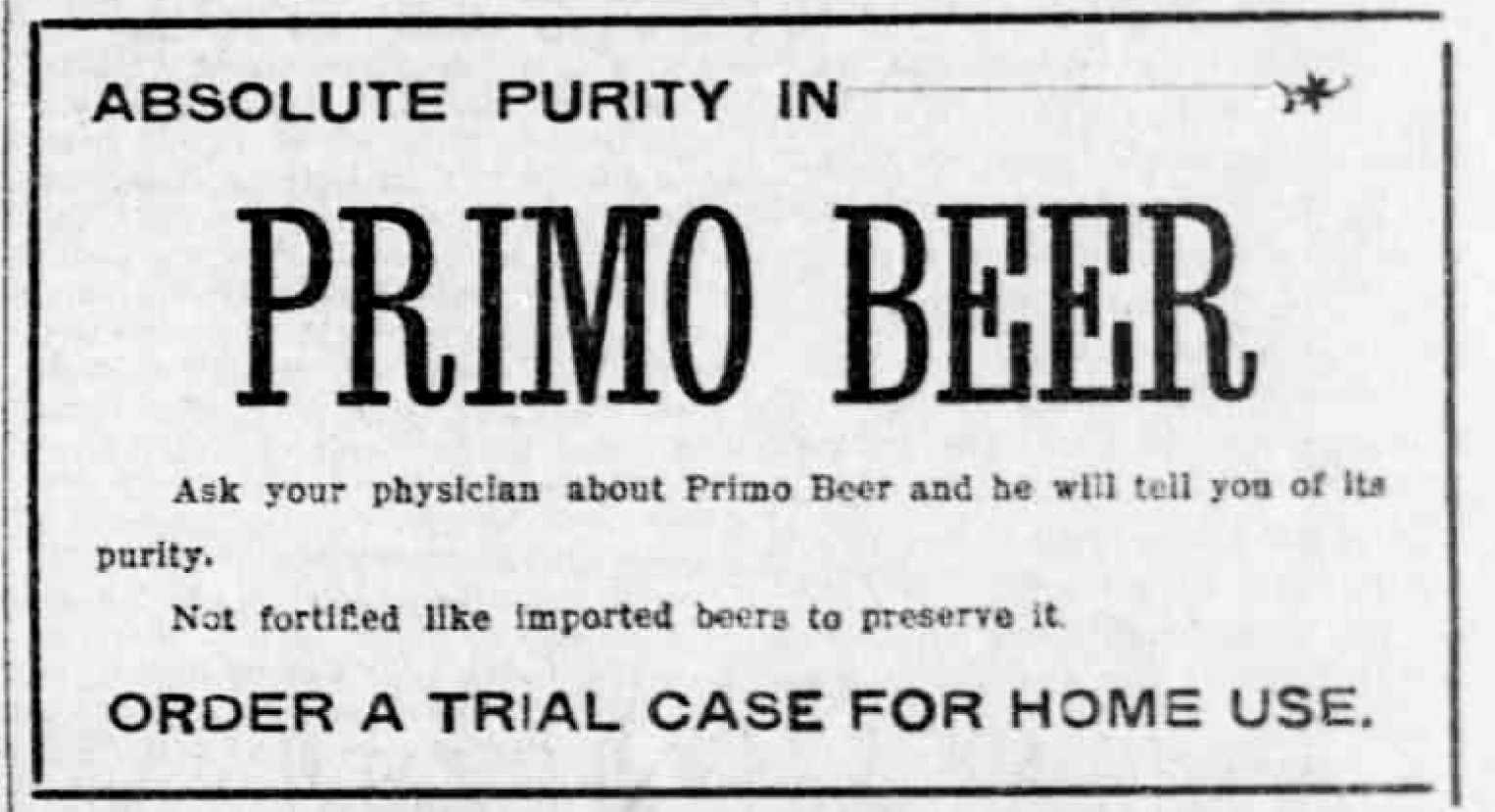
Advertisement from 1901

== See also ==
- List of breweries in Hawaii
