= Mönchpfiffel-Nikolausrieth =

- Municipality
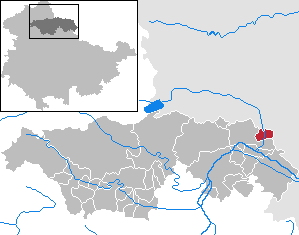
- Location of Mönchpfiffel-Nikolausrieth within Kyffhäuserkreis district
- Interactive map of Mönchpfiffel-Nikolausrieth
- Location within Germany Location within Thuringia
- Coordinates: 51°23′N 11°22′E
- Country: Germany
- State: Thuringia
- District: Kyffhäuserkreis

Government
  - Mayor (2022–28): André Schlegel

Area
  - Total: 9.15 km^{2} (3.53 sq mi)
- Elevation: 123 m (404 ft)

Population (2025-12-31)
  - Total: 284
  - Density: 31.0/km^{2} (80.4/sq mi)
- Time zone: UTC+01:00 (CET)
  - Summer (DST): UTC+02:00 (CEST)
- Postal codes: 06556
- Dialling codes: 03 46 52
- Vehicle registration: KYF

Mönchpfiffel-Nikolausrieth is a municipality on the river Helme in the district Kyffhäuserkreis, in Thuringia, Germany. The municipality was created in 1956 by the merging of the villages Monchpfiffel and Nikolausrieth.

== History ==
In the tithing rolls of Hersfeld Abbey which date from between 881 and 899, Mönchpfiffel is listed as the tithable place Bablide in Friesenfeld.

Nikolausrieth in the area of the Golden Aue (Golden Meadow) was first mentioned in the year 1226 as Novale St. Nicolai in a document from Walkenried. J.M. Schamelius listed in his monastery directory of 1733 a convent as having been founded here in 1236 and as 'ruined' after the Reformation.

Mönchspfiffel is a historical monastery property which was a branch of the Cistercian Walkenried Abbey. From 1920 to 1945 it belonged to the free state Thuringia. After the war and until 1991 it was a Volkseigenes Gut and Landwirtschaftliche Produktionsgenossenschaft, a type of collectivized farm in East Germany. In 1995 it was sold to Raiffeisenbank-Agil Warengenossenschaft, an agricultural cooperative.

A notable point is that each of the constituent villages were until 2008 in different church provinces of the Evangelical Church. Nikolausrieth belonged to church province of Saxony while Mönchpfiffel belonged to the Thuringian. Since 2009 the two belong to the merged Evangelical Church in Central Germany. The reason for this is that the river Helme was the former border between the Weimar exclave Allstedt and the Prussian province of Saxony.

=== Population ===
As of 31 December unless otherwise noted.

- 1994 - 413
- 1995 - 410
- 1996 - 425
- 1997 - 425
- 1998 - 418
- 1999 - 424
- 2000 - 421
- 2001 - 412
- 2002 - 419
- 2003 - 415
- 2004 - 411
- 2005 - 417
- 2006 - 403
- 2007 - 400
- 2008 - 398
- 2009 - 390
- 2010 - 386
- 2011 - 347
- 2012 - 345
- 2013 - 342
- 2014 - 329
- 2015 - 319

Source: Thüringian State Office of Statistics

== Transport ==
The nearest train station is in Artern on the Sangerhausen–Erfurt railway. A bus connection to there as well as to Allstedt is run as bus line 515 by the Südharz Transport Company.

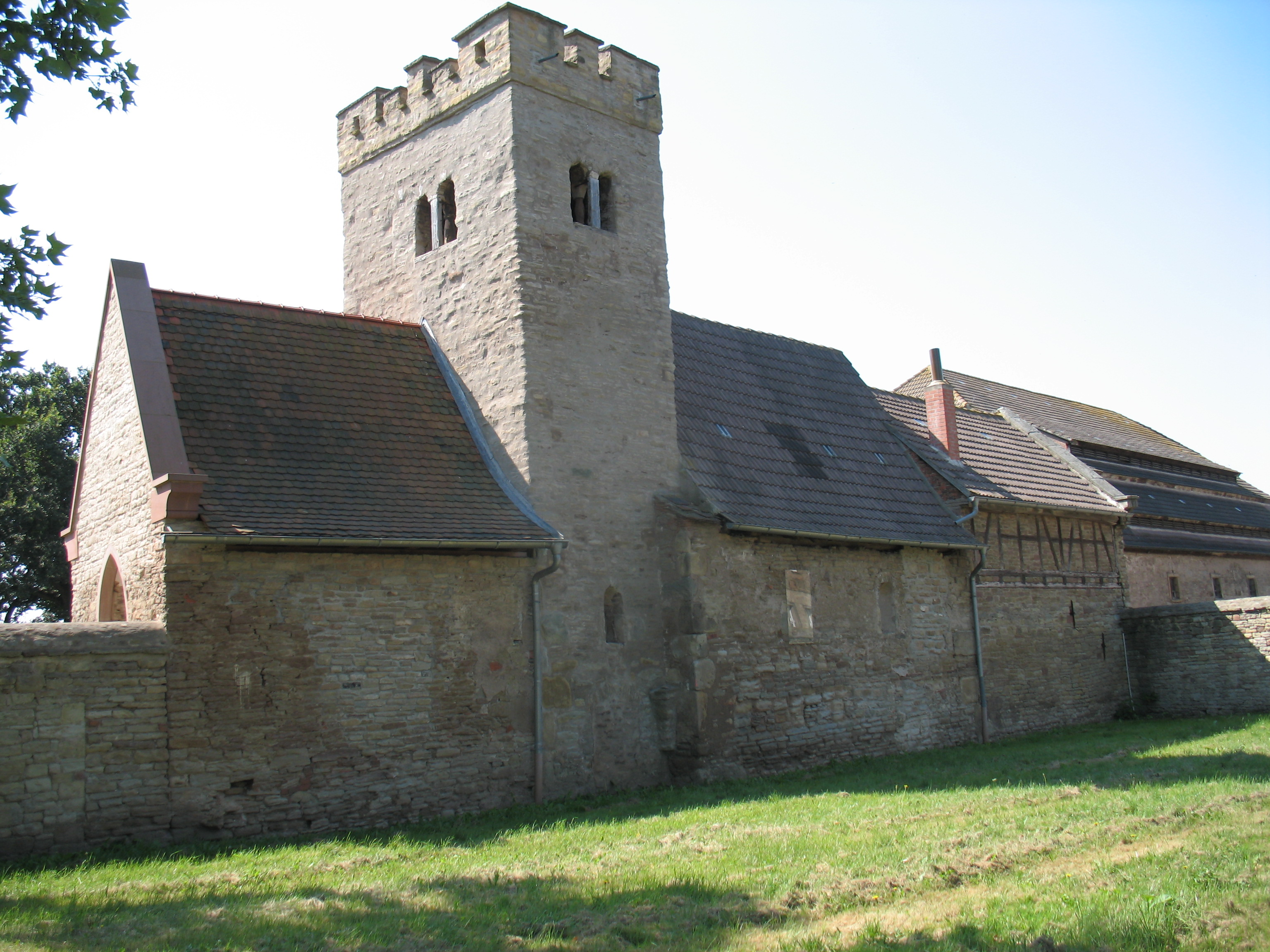
Cistercian Monastery Chapel in Mönchpfiffel

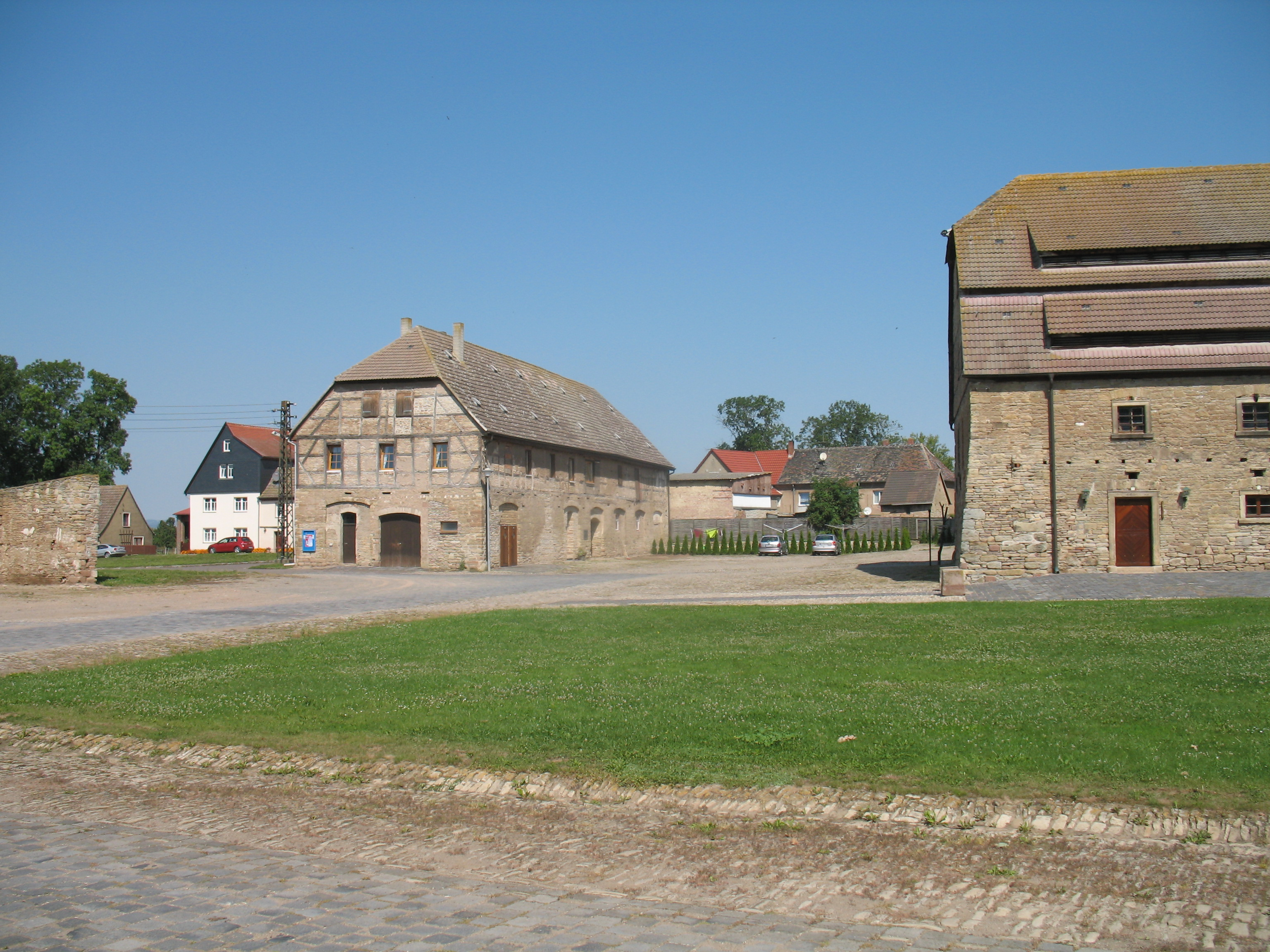
Monastery Buildings in Mönchpfiffel

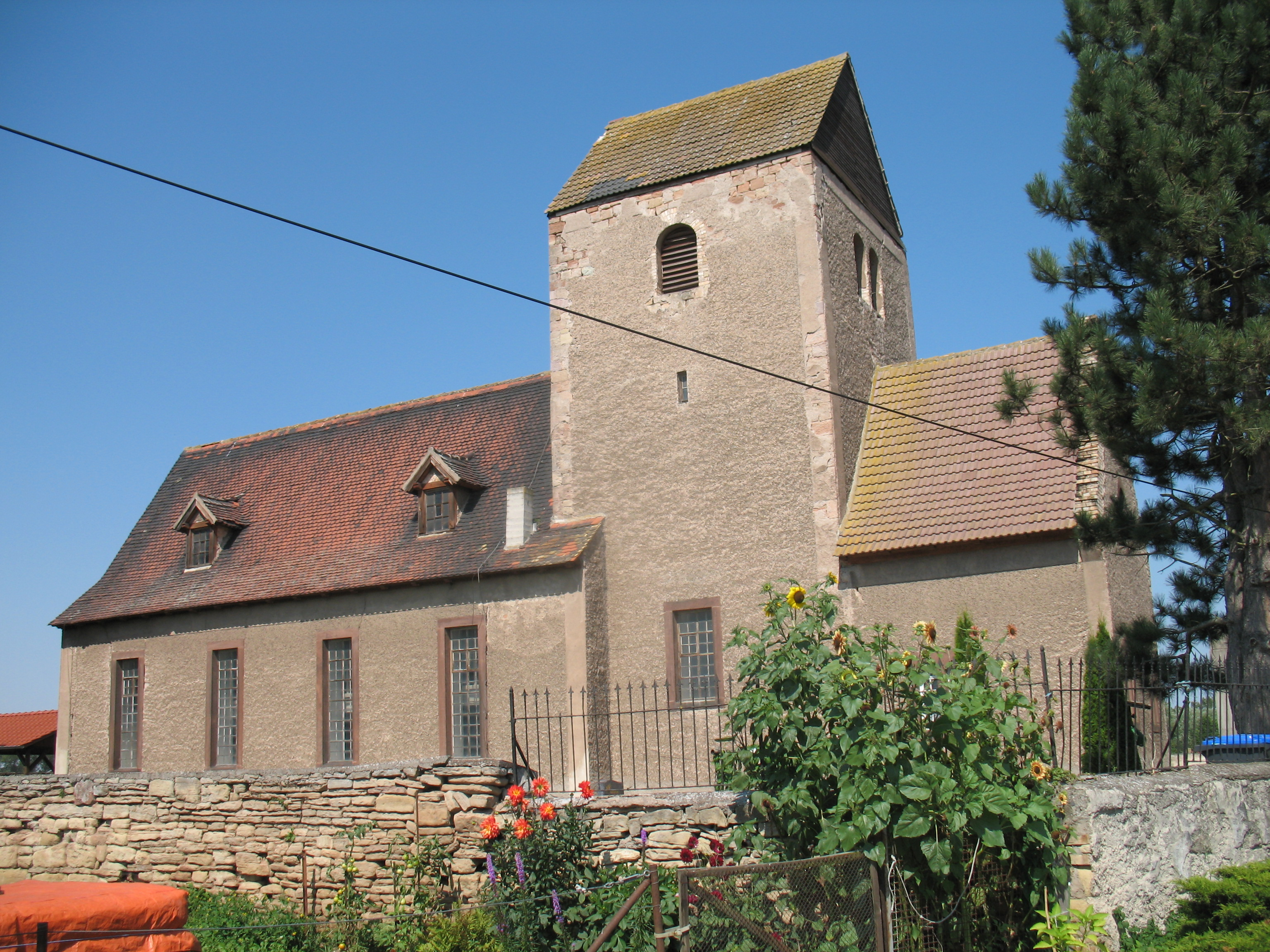
Village Chapel in Nikolausrieth
