= Lisette Schandein =

American businesswoman (1848–1905)

Lisette Schandein, (c. 1848 – 1905), a.k.a. Lisette Best Schandein, Lizette Best, Elizabeth Best, Elizabeth Best Schandein, and Lizette Best Schandein, was the first vice-president of Pabst Brewing Company. She held the position from 1888 through 1894.

== Biography ==
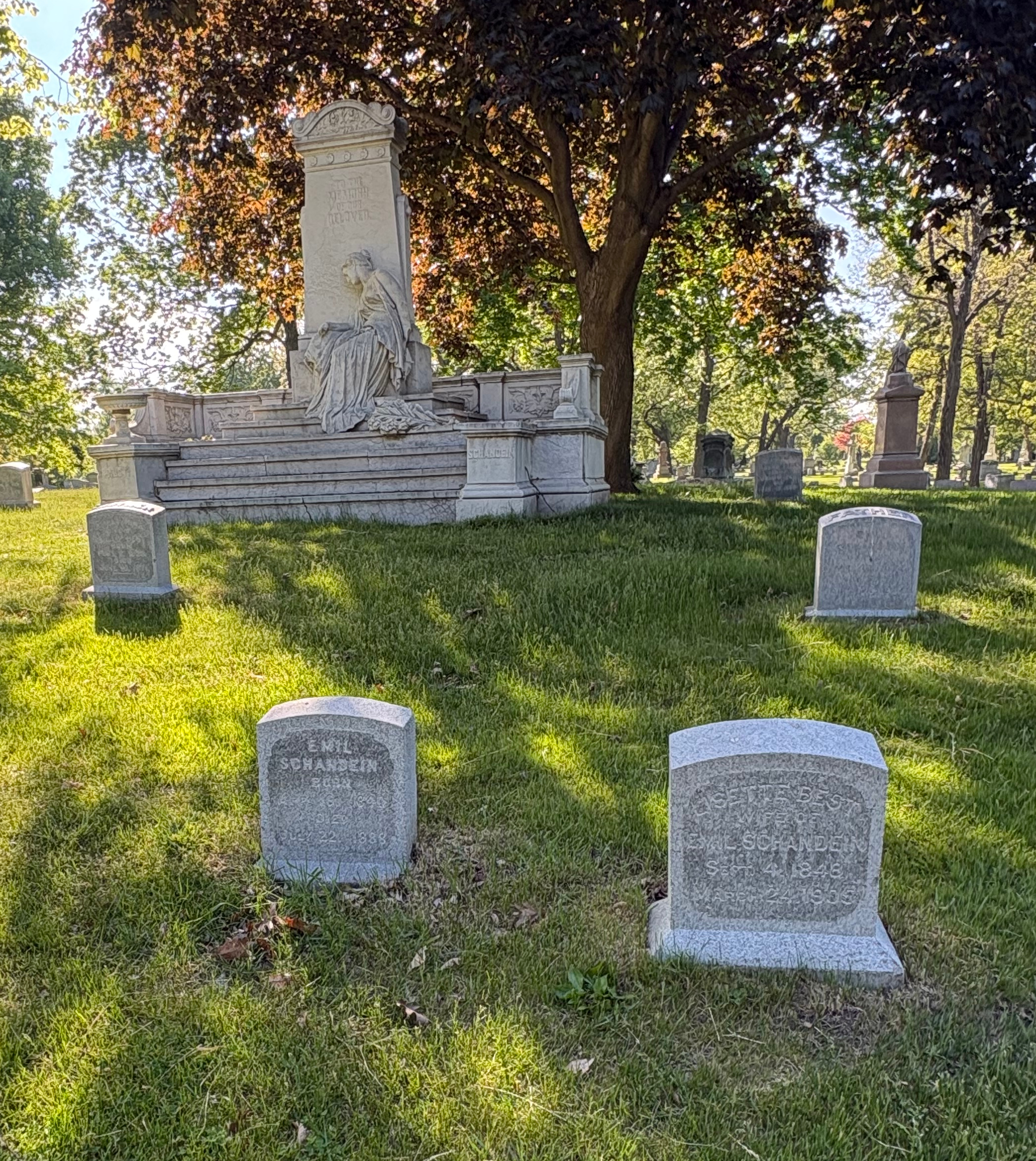
Graves of Emil and Lisette Schandein at Forest Home Cemetery

Lisette was a daughter of Major General Phillip Best who owned a brewery in Milwaukee, Wisconsin. Her father became closely acquainted with Captain Frederick Pabst due to his frequent travels on the Lake Michigan ship Captain Frederick Pabst captained. Her father introduced Pabst to her older sister, Maria Best. In 1862, the two were married.

In 1864, Frederick Pabst bought half of the operation of her father's brewery and became vice-president.

In 1866, Lisette married Emil Schandein, and her father sold the remaining half of the business to her husband, making Frederick Pabst president, and her husband vice-president.

Emil and Lisette began building a 40,000 square foot mansion on Grand Avenue in Milwaukee, Wisconsin. Emil had even imported the architect from Germany to recreate a castle he had seen in Bingen, Germany. In 1888, Emil Schandein unexpectedly died in Germany, and he was never able to see the house fully completed.

Lisette took over as vice-president of the company which she remained until 1894.

In 1903, she left Milwaukee and returned to Germany, where she died after suffering a stroke, leaving her $7,800,000 estate to be fought over in court by her remaining children, Mrs. Jacob Heyl (Clara), Mrs. Louis Frank, and her deaf son, Emil M. Schandein. The court case made national headlines due to the testimony that took place in regards to Lisette's long term affair with Jacob Heyl who had somehow arranged to be executor of the will, while also inheriting the bulk of the wealth. Schandein and Heyl's affair was able to be kept hidden through a sham marriage arranged between him and her first daughter Louise. When her daughter Louise died, a second marriage had been arranged for Heyl with another one of her daughters, Clara, who divorced Heyl in 1907.

Lisette Schandein was buried at Forest Home Cemetery in Milwaukee.
