= Eugene Kashper =

American businessman

- Born: Soviet Union
- Education: Columbia University
- Occupations: Chairman, Blue Ribbon Partners; 2021-present
- Years active: 1994-present
- Known for: Chairman and CEO of Pabst Brewing Company

Eugene Kashper (Russian: Евгений Кашпер) is an American beer entrepreneur and chairman of Blue Ribbon Partners. He was the chairman and CEO of Pabst Brewing Company.

== Early life ==
Kashper was born in the Soviet Union to Jewish parents; he has told Russian interviewers he was born in Leningrad in 1969. He and his family immigrated to the United States as political refugees when he was six years old, and he became an American citizen shortly after. He grew up in Arizona and New Jersey, and after high school at the Lawrenceville School, attended Columbia University, graduating in 1992 with a degree in East Asian Studies.

== Career ==
He then went to work for Ernst & Young, which quickly capitalized on his language skills by sending him to Moscow. Soon after that move, he left Ernst & Young and moved into the beer industry.

He began his beer industry career in 1994 with the Stroh Brewery Company of Detroit, Michigan. After the Russian government started imposing taxes on imported beer, he founded the Pivovarni Ivana Taranova (PIT) brewery with plants in Khabarovsk, Novotroitsk, and Kaliningrad. In just a few years the company had become the biggest independent producer of beer before its founders sold it to Heineken in 2005 – only to start all over again just outside the Russian capital with a bigger, more modern enterprise in 2006 - Moscow Brewing Company.

He later co-founded Oasis Beverages and served as its chairman from 2008 to 2014.

In 2014, Blue Ribbon Intermediate Holdings — a partnership between Kashper and TSG Consumer Partners — completed its purchase of Pabst Brewing Company. The amount of the deal remained unknown, but the company was valued at $700–750 million at the time of the purchase. PBC's previous owners, the Metropoulos family, purchased the brewery for $250 million in 2010. "We are thrilled to complete the acquisition of this great company," said Kashper, who said he would relocate with his family from New York to Los Angeles. In 2021, it was announced that Blue Ribbon Partners, an investment platform led by Kashper focused on US beer and beverages, owns Pabst Brewing Company. Blue Ribbon Partners is also an investor in City Brewing, the largest beverage alcohol co-packer in the U.S.
