= Pabst Brewing Company =

American brewing company

Coordinates: 29.432850°N 98.483145°W

- Industry: Alcoholic beverage
- Founded: 1844 in Milwaukee, Wisconsin, U.S.
- Founder: Jacob Best
- Headquarters: San Antonio, Texas, U.S.
- Key people: Frederick Pabst
- Products: Beer
- Owner: Blue Ribbon Partners
- Website: pabst.com

Pabst Brewing Company (/ˈpæpst/) is an American brewery based in San Antonio, Texas. It was founded in 1844 in Milwaukee, Wisconsin, by Jacob Best and later named after Frederick Pabst, who expanded the company significantly during the late 19th century. The company became one of the largest brewers in the United States by the turn of the 20th century. It oversees a diverse portfolio of legacy American beer brands, including its flagship Pabst Blue Ribbon, its former Milwaukee rival Schlitz, Old Milwaukee, and Lone Star.

Though it closed its Milwaukee brewing facility in 1996, the company continued operations through contract brewing arrangements with other manufacturers. Most recently, it has been in concurrent production agreements with City Brewing Company since 2019 and AB InBev since 2025. Pabst Brewing Company underwent a series of ownership changes in the 21st century; since 2021, Pabst has been fully owned by Blue Ribbon Partners, an investment platform led by American beer and beverage entrepreneur Eugene Kashper.

== History ==
=== 19th century ===
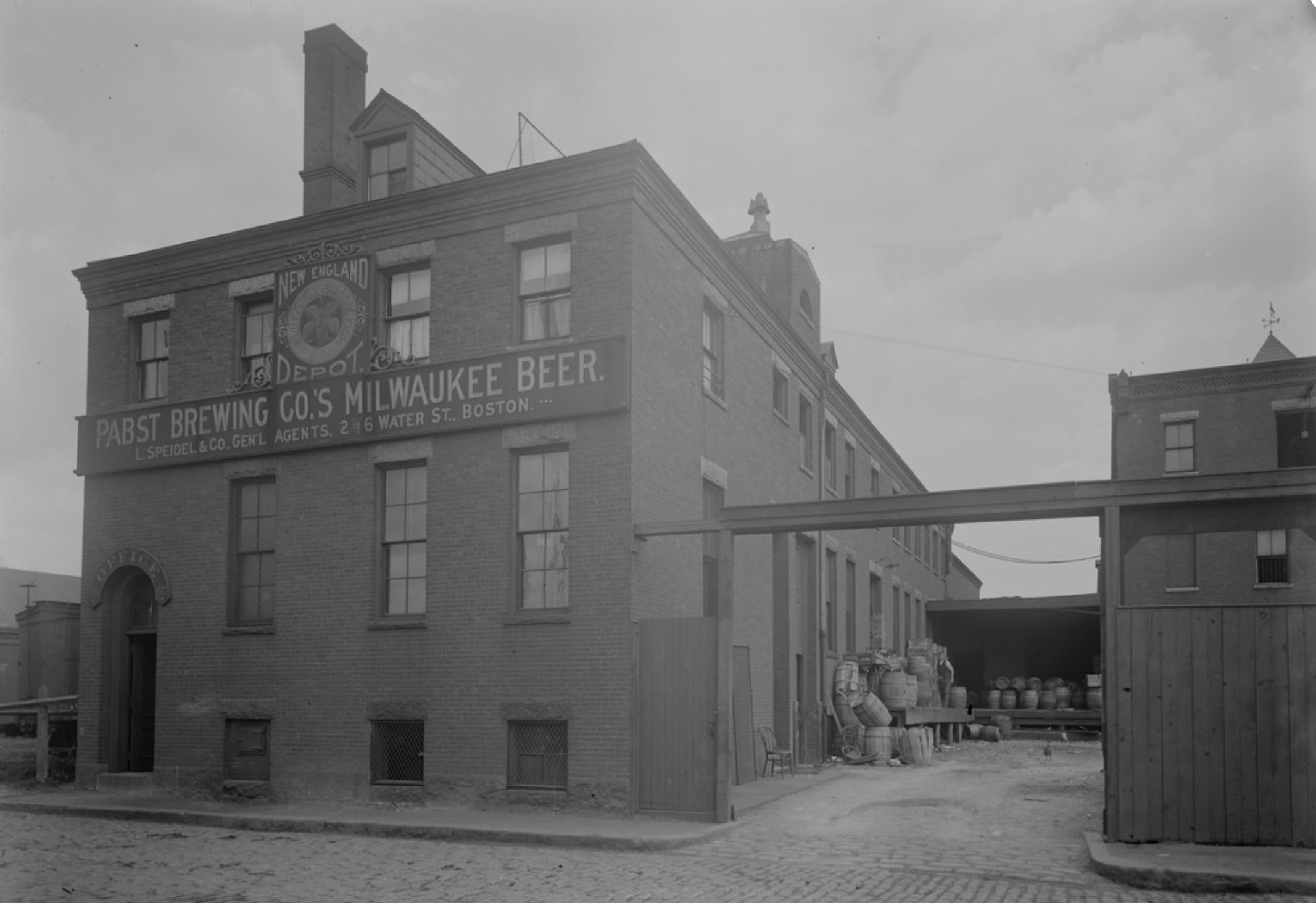
Pabst's New England Depot in Boston, c. 1898

The original brewery was founded in 1844 as The Empire Brewery, later Best and Company, by brewer Jacob Best. The brewery was run by Jacob Sr. and his sons Phillip, Charles, Jacob Jr., and Lorenz. Phillip took control of the company in 1860. They started the brewery on Chestnut Street Hill in Milwaukee with a capacity of 18 US barrels (2.1 m^{3}). Later, in 1863, Frederick Pabst, a steamship captain and son-in-law of Phillip Best, bought 50% of Phillip Best, and assumed the role of vice president. In 1866, Best's other daughter, Lisette, married Emil Schandein, to whom Best sold the remaining half of the business. This move made Frederick Pabst president, and Emil Schandein vice-president. Lisette Schandein took over as vice-president of the company through 1894 after her husband's death.

Two factors helped position the company for significant growth: the untimely death of Milwaukee brewing competitor C.T. Melms in 1869 due to an infection from a needle, and the Great Chicago Fire of 1871. Melms' brewery was sold to Best and Company after Melms' death, which greatly expanded capacity for the company. Then, with the fire in Chicago a couple of years later wiping out the Chicago brewing industry, the company was in a position to grow with less competition to worry about. By 1874 Phillip Best Brewing Co. was the nation's largest brewer. The brewery's best-seller was a lager, Best Select, which began public sales in 1875. By 1893, Pabst became the first brewer in the United States to sell more than one million U.S. barrels (120 million liters) of beer in a year.

=== 20th century ===
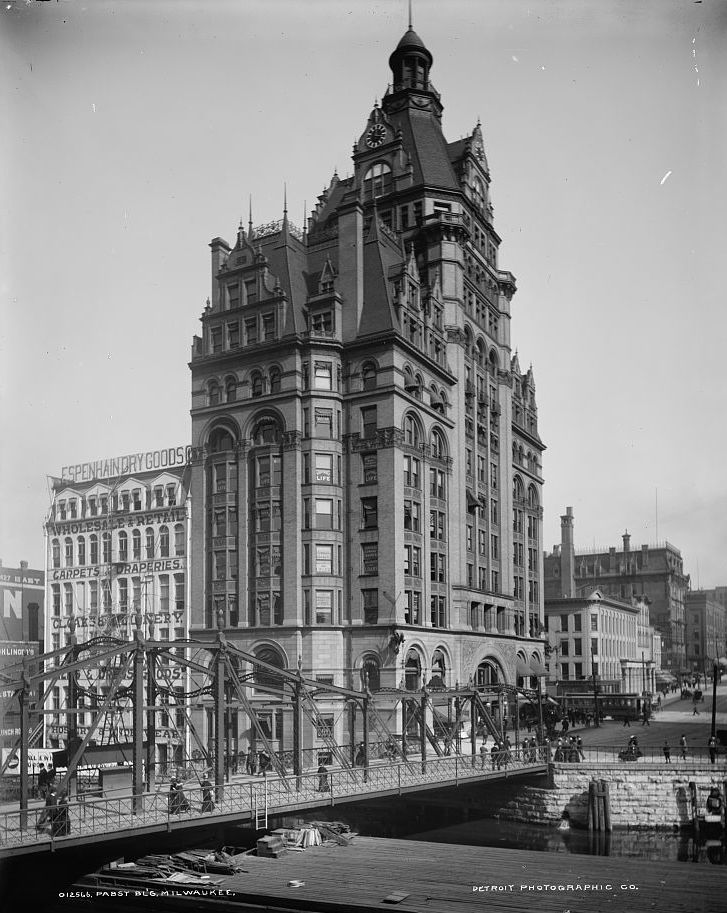
The Pabst Building in Milwaukee in the early 20th century

During much of the 20th century, Pabst was run by Harris Perlstein, who was named president by Frederick Pabst in 1932 after a merger of Pabst Brewing and Premier Malt Products Co. (the latter of which Perlstein had been president). Perlstein emphasized research and innovation; under his direction, Pabst worked with American Can Company to produce the first beer cans, worked to create product consistency among multiple location breweries, and invested heavily in advertising and promotion. Pabst was involved in the 1953 Milwaukee brewery strike. In 1954, Perlstein was named chairman, and served until 1972; he then served as chairman of the executive committee until his retirement in 1979. Pabst's sales reached a peak of 15.6 million US barrels (1.86 billion litres) in 1978 before they entered into a steep decline.

During Prohibition, Pabst stopped making beer and switched to cheese production, selling more than 8 million pounds (3.6 million kilograms) of Pabst-ett Cheese. When Prohibition ended, the company went back to selling beer, and the cheese line was sold to Kraft.

Pabst was renowned in Milwaukee for its brewery tours. Visitors to Pabst's tour were rewarded with sometimes bottomless glasses of beer at its end-of-tour Sternewirt Pub. Complete with a statue of Captain Frederick Pabst and waitresses pouring from pitchers of Pabst Blue Ribbon, Pabst Bock, and Andeker, the pub was popular with tourists and locals alike, especially students from nearby Marquette University and the University of Wisconsin–Milwaukee.

Paul Kalmanovitz, a "self-made" beer and real-estate baron, purchased the Pabst Brewing company in 1985 for $63 million in a hostile takeover through the auspices of his holding company S&P Co.; S&P Co.'s first brewery was Maier Brewing Company, purchased in 1958. When Kalmanovitz died in 1987, S&P became legally inseparable from the Kalmanovitz Charitable Trust.

In 1996, Pabst's entire beer production was contracted out to the Stroh Brewery Company, which utilized excess capacity at the former flagship brewery of the G. Heileman Brewing Company of La Crosse, Wisconsin, it had absorbed earlier that year. In turn, the historic Pabst brewery in Milwaukee was closed, ending a 152-year association with the city and turning that company into a virtual brewer. In 1999, Pabst purchased the Stroh label, and the brewery in La Crosse was sold to City Brewing Company.

=== 21st century ===
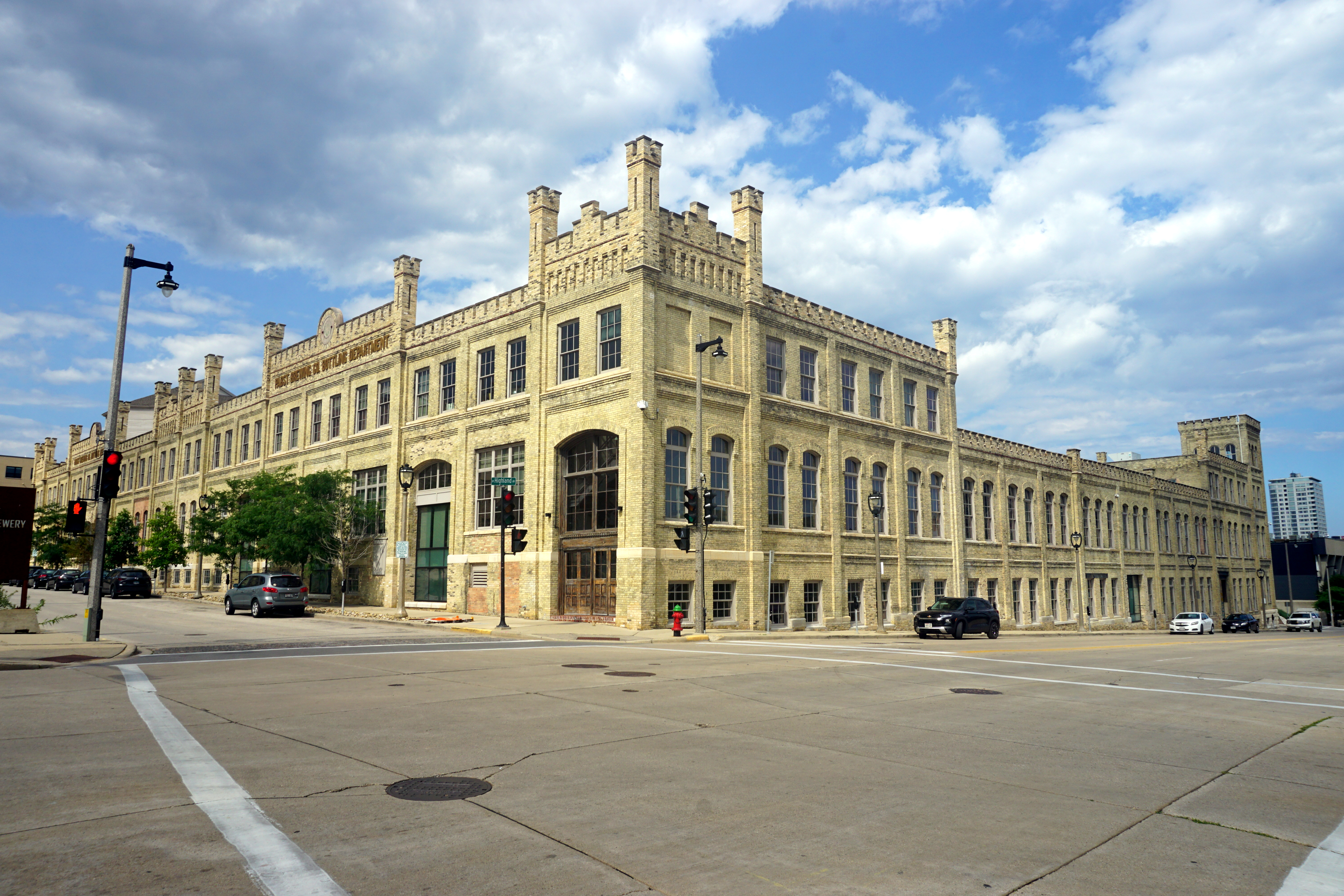
Former bottling department at the Pabst Brewery Complex, Milwaukee

In 2001, production was contracted to Miller Brewing Company, and by then, what remained of the Pabst company operated out of San Antonio. S&P was ordered by the IRS to sell the Pabst Brewing Company by 2005 or lose its not-for-profit, tax-free status. After a while, Pabst Brewing claimed that they were unable to find a buyer at market value and requested an extension until 2010 which the IRS granted. In 2006, CEO Brian Kovalchuk resigned and the board replaced him with Kevin Kotecki. Kotecki swiftly moved the Pabst Brewing Company and its roughly 100 headquarters personnel to Woodridge, Illinois, a Chicago suburb. The offices in Woodridge were located on historic U.S. Route 66.

Between 2005 and 2010, "PBR brand volume increased 69%, and Pabst's gross margins increased 48 percent, operating profit rose 81 percent, and net revenue per barrel increased 28 percent." On May 28, 2008, a former Pabst brewery in Newark, New Jersey, which was in the process of being demolished, caught fire and was seriously damaged.

On May 26, 2010, investor Dean Metropoulos reached a deal to purchase Pabst for about $250 million. On May 14, 2011, it was announced that Pabst would be relocating to Los Angeles. Pabst retains a data center in San Antonio, the previous location of its headquarters. Pabst's shuttered Pabst Brewery Complex in Milwaukee was targeted to be redeveloped into restaurants, entertainment venues, stores, housing and offices. The $317 million project became the subject of public debate in Milwaukee.

Pabst Brewing Company announced November 13, 2014, that it had completed its sale to Blue Ribbon Intermediate Holdings, LLC, a partnership between American beer entrepreneur Eugene Kashper and San Francisco-based private equity firm TSG Consumer Partners. Prior reports suggested the price agreed upon was around $700 million. In July 2015, Pabst announced plans to return to Milwaukee and refurbish a former church and training center on the site of the original Pabst Brewing complex as a micro-brewery and taproom. This project was completed in Spring 2017, with the taproom featuring both newly developed and historic beers in the Pabst portfolio. The project was completed in 2017 and closed in 2020 as a result of the COVID-19 pandemic, with the taproom taken over by Central Waters Brewing Company in 2021.

In November 2018, a lawsuit by Pabst against MillerCoors reached the trial stage. Pabst argued that MillerCoors wanted to put it out of business by ending a longstanding contract through which MillerCoors brews Pabst's beers. Pabst said that MillerCoors is its only option for the 4 to 4.5 million US bbl (480 to 540 million L) brewed annually for the company, since Anheuser-Busch did not do contract brewing. The lawsuit was settled out of court, and the contract between the two companies was renewed.

In 2019, Pabst signed a 20-year production agreement with City Brewing Company. Pabst exercised its option to purchase Molson Coors's Irwindale, California, brewery in 2020, and in 2021 sold the Irwindale brewery to City Brewing. The transition of production from Molson Coors to City Brewing was underway in 2022. By early 2025, Pabst had entered into a second production agreement with AB InBev.

== International production ==
Pabst Blue Ribbon America has a licensing agreement and joint venture arrangement with China Pabst Blue Ribbon. It is produced, marketed and distributed by CBR Brewing Company, which jointly owns the company along with Guangdong Blue Ribbon Group under a sub-licensing agreement with the Pabst Brewing Company. CBR is a British Virgin Islands owned company but it is based in China. China Pabst recently released a new beer called Pabst Blue Ribbon 1844 for consumption in the domestic market; it sells for US$44 a bottle.

In 1999, Sleeman Breweries in Guelph, Ontario, a division of Sapporo Breweries, acquired Stroh Canada which owned the Canadian rights to a folio of brands, including Pabst. Sleeman then became the Canadian manufacturer and distributor of those products.

== Product lines ==
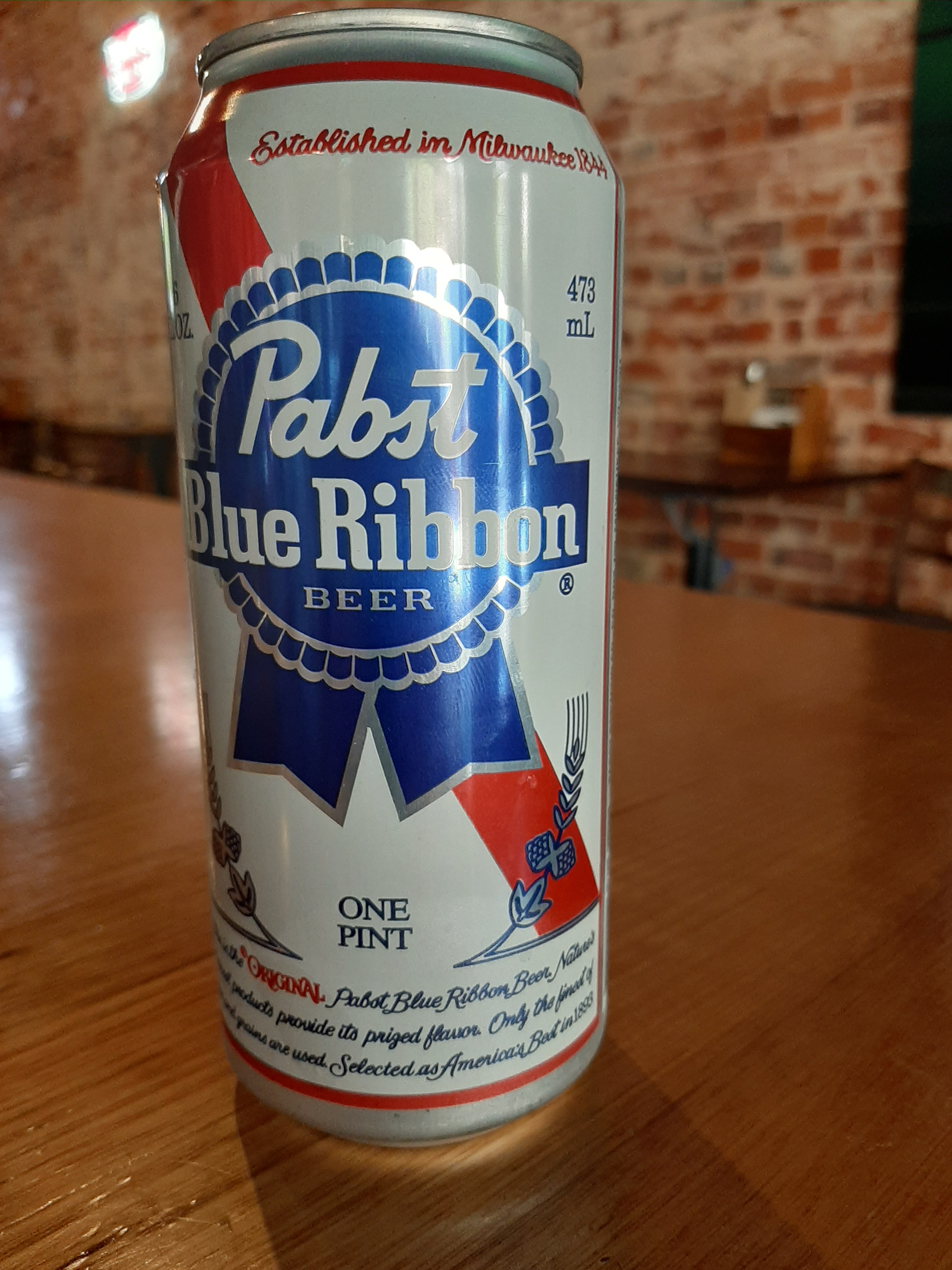
A 16-US-fluid-ounce (470 mL; 17 imp fl oz) can of Pabst Blue Ribbon

=== Pabst Blue Ribbon ===
Pabst Blue Ribbon, also known as "PBR", is the namesake of the Pabst Brewing Company products. Originally called Best Select, and then Pabst Select, the current name came from the blue ribbons that were tied around the neck of the bottle, a practice that ran from 1882 until 1916, and discontinued due to a silk shortage during World War I. After Prohibition, the blue ribbons were once again tied around the neck of the bottle, a custom that endured from 1933 until 1950.

Besides the 4.7% alcohol by volume Original, there are now also Pabst Extra a stronger 6.5% lager, Pabst Easy which is their low calorie light beer offering (3.8% ABV), and Pabst Non-Alc with less than 0.5% ABV.

In July 2019, the organization began testing a Hard Coffee line of drinks under the Pabst Blue Ribbon name in states along the East Coast, as well as a hard tea, hard seltzers, and even a whiskey.

==== Products ====
Brewing products include (or have included):

- P. Ballantine and Sons Brewing Company,
- G. Heileman Brewing Company,
- Lone Star Brewing Company,
- Pearl Brewing Company,
- Piels Bros.,
- Valentin Blatz Brewing Company,
- National Brewing Company,
- Olympia Brewing Company,
- Falstaff Brewing Corporation,
- Primo Brewing & Malting Company,
- Rainier Brewing Company,
- F & M Schaefer Brewing Company,
- Joseph Schlitz Brewing Company,
- Christian Schmidt Brewing Company,
- Jacob Schmidt Brewing Company, and
- Stroh Brewery Company.

About half of the beer produced under Pabst's ownership is Pabst Blue Ribbon brand, with the other half their other owned brands.

The company is also responsible for the brewing of Ice Man Malt Liquor, St. Ides High Gravity Malt Liquor, and retail versions of beers from McSorley's Old Ale House and Southampton Publick House (of Southampton, New York).

=== Jacob Best ===
Jacob Best Pilsner is a pale lager named after Pabst's founder, Jacob Best.

=== Ballantine ===
Ballantine Brewery was acquired by Pabst in 1985 when it bought the Falstaff Brewing Corporation. Ballantine's flagship beer, Ballantine XXX Ale, has remained on the market since Prohibition ended. Ballantine IPA re-launched in August 2014 after nearly 20 years off the market.

=== Schlitz ===
Schlitz was first brewed by the Joseph Schlitz Brewing Company in Milwaukee. Schlitz was one of the world's top-selling beers during the first half of the 20th century. Pabst Brewing Company also produces four Schlitz malt liquors—Schlitz Red Bull, Schlitz Bull Ice, Schlitz High Gravity, and Schlitz Malt Liquor. It will be discontinued, with the final batch being brewed in Verona, Wisconsin on May 23, 2026. The final batch will be sold starting on June 27, 2026.

=== Blatz ===
Blatz was the flagship brand of the Valentin Blatz Brewing Company of Milwaukee. The brewery was a major competitor of Pabst, Miller, G. Heileman, and other Milwaukee-area brewers, but was bought out in 1968 by Pabst. Pabst then sold Blatz to the G. Heileman Brewing Company in 1969. Under contract, Pabst continued to produce Blatz beer into the 1990s, when it was discontinued. The brand was revived in 2007 and is currently being brewed under contract by the Miller Brewing Company in Milwaukee.

=== Old Milwaukee ===
Old Milwaukee is a pale lager. The beer was first brewed in 1890 by the Joseph Schlitz Brewing Company in Milwaukee, and was re-introduced in 1955 as a value-priced beer.

=== Colt 45 ===
Colt 45 is a brand of malt liquor first produced in 1963 by the National Brewing Company in Baltimore, Maryland.

=== St. Ides ===
St. Ides is a brand of malt liquor first launched by the McKenzie River Corporation in 1987. St. Ides gained prominence during the late 1980s and early 1990s through the company's use of celebrity endorsements by rap artists such as Ice Cube, 2Pac, Dr. Dre, Snoop Dogg, Scarface, The Notorious B.I.G., and Method Man & Redman.

=== Stroh's ===
The Stroh Brewery Company in Detroit, Michigan first brewed Stroh's beer in 1850. Stroh's is an American-style lager.

=== Old Style ===
Old Style was first brewed in 1902 by the G. Heileman Brewing Company in La Crosse, Wisconsin, under the name Old Style Lager; it was popular in Wisconsin, the Chicago metro area, Minnesota, eastern Iowa, Lincoln, Nebraska, southwestern Michigan, Upper Michigan, and Fargo and Grand Forks, North Dakota. It has been served at Wrigley Field for decades and is popular with fans of the Chicago Cubs. The original Heileman's Old Style brewery in La Crosse is now owned by the City Brewing Company. It brews La Crosse Lager, which is based upon the original Old Style recipe and is kräusened for 30 days.

In the early 1990s, Chicago-born actor Dennis Farina made a series of commercials for Old Style beer, mentioning that it was "our great beer... and they can't have it." In 2016, the production of Old Style returned to the La Crosse brewery under a new contract with Pabst; City Brewery became the sole producer of the Old Style brand. Along with the homecoming of the beer, the brand introduced Old Style Oktoberfest.

=== Lone Star ===
Lone Star was first brewed by Lone Star Brewing Company in San Antonio, Texas. It was Lone Star Brewing Company's main brand and marketed as "The National Beer of Texas".

=== Olympia ===
Olympia was an American-style pale lager. The Olympia Brewing Company in Tumwater, Washington first brewed Olympia beer in 1896, with Pabst purchasing the label and brewing the beer from 1983 to 2021.

A Sacramento resident filed a class-action lawsuit against Pabst in 2018 for allegations of false advertising due to the depiction of Tumwater Falls and the slogan "It's the water" on Olympia's bottles despite the beer being brewed using water from the San Gabriel Valley in Southern California. In 2020, the judge allowed the case to proceed. In January 2021, Pabst announced it was discontinuing Olympia beer. The suit was dismissed in 2022 as the plaintiff "could not show a concrete threat of future harm".

=== Rainier Beer ===
Rainier Beer was first brewed in Seattle, Washington by the Rainier Brewing Company. It is popular in the Pacific Northwest of the United States.

=== Schmidt's of Philadelphia ===
Schmidt's of Philadelphia, which had no connection to the St. Paul Schmidt Beer, was brewed by the Christian Schmidt Brewing Company, founded in 1860.

=== Schmidt Beer ===
Schmidt Beer was first brewed by the Jacob Schmidt Brewing Company in St. Paul, Minnesota in 1855. It is popular throughout the Upper Midwest.

=== National Bohemian ===
National Bohemian was the flagship beer of the National Brewing Company in Baltimore, Maryland. It is a Bohemian-style American beer. Ninety percent of National Bohemian sales are in the Baltimore area.

== Former independent brands ==
=== Andeker ===
Pabst introduced a premium brewed European style lager called Andeker in 1939. After being discontinued in the 1960s it was brought back from 1972 to 1986. It has been described as "The most European of the Americans, with full body and well-modulated flavor. Creamy rather than violently carbonated, sharp but not bitter." Andeker has been revived by Pabst at their microbrewery on the old Pabst brewery grounds in Milwaukee, is available on tap, in growlers and crowlers.

=== Red, White and Blue ===
Red White & Blue was a brand of beer produced and sold by Pabst from before Prohibition until the mid-1980s. Pre-Prohibition advertisements lauded its mellow taste and drinkability. After years of average sales, the brand saw significant growth in the early 1980s due to creative marketing campaigns. However, Pabst reformulated it to reduce costs and by the mid-1980s it was known as a "cheap beer". Sales steeply declined and the brand was discontinued.

== Awards ==
Awards at the Great American Beer Festival:

Year	Award	Category	Beer
1990	Silver	American Lager	Pabst Blue Ribbon
1990	Silver	Malt Liquor	Olde English 800
1991	Gold	American Lager	Pearl Lager Beer
1991	Gold	American Malt Liquor	Olde English 800
1992	Gold	American Malt Liquor	Olde English 800
1992	Silver	American Lager	Hamm's
1992	Silver	American Dry Lager	Olympia Dry
1993	Gold	American Dry Lager	Olympia Dry
1993	Bronze	Mixed/Non-Alcoholic	Pabst NA
1994	Gold	American Light Lager	Pabst Genuine Draft Light
1994	Gold	American Malt Liquor	Olde English 800
1994	Silver	American Dry Lager	Olympia Dry
1995	Gold	American Light Lager	Pabst Genuine Draft Light
1995	Gold	American Malt Liquor	Olde English 800
1995	Gold	American Specialty Lager	Olympia Dry
1996	Gold	American Light Lager	Pabst Genuine Draft Light
1996	Silver	American Lager	Pabst Blue Ribbon
1997	Gold	American Style Specialty Lager	Olde English 800
1997	Gold	Non-Alcoholic Malt Beverages	Pabst NA
1998	Gold	Non-Alcoholic Malt Beverages	Pabst NA
1998	Silver	American Style Light Lager	Pabst Genuine Draft Light
2000	Silver	Non-Alcoholic Malt Beverages	Pabst NA
2003	Gold	American Style Light Lager	Old Style Light
2003	Gold	American Style Lager	Old Milwaukee
2003	Silver	American Style Lager	Rainier
2003	Bronze	American Style Light Lager	Old Milwaukee Light
2003	Bronze	American Lager/Ale or Cream Ale	Old Style
2004	Gold	Non-Alcoholic Malt Beverage	Old Milwaukee NA
2004	Gold	American Style Light Lager	Rainier Light
2004	Gold	American Style Lager	Old Milwaukee
2004	Silver	American Lager/Ale or Cream Ale	Special Export
2004	Silver	American Style Light Lager	Old Milwaukee Light
2004	Silver	American Style Specialty Lager	Schlitz Malt Liquor
2004	Bronze	American Style Lager	Schlitz
2004	Bronze	American Style Premium Lager	Pabst Blue Ribbon
2004	Bronze	American Style Specialty Lager	St. Ides Malt Liquor
2005	Gold	American Style Premium Lager	Pabst Blue Ribbon
2005	Gold	American Style Lager	Stag
2005	Gold	American Style Light Lager	Old Milwaukee Light
2005	Silver	American Style Premium Lager	Olympia
2005	Silver	American Style Lager	Rainier
2005	Bronze	American Cream Ale or Lager	Special Export
2006	Gold	American Style Lager	Pabst Blue Ribbon
2006	Gold	American Style Light Lager	Old Milwaukee Light
2006	Silver	American Cream Ale or Lager	Lone Star
2006	Bronze	American Style Lager	Blatz
2007	Gold	American-Style Cream Ale or Lager	Lone Star
2007	Gold	American Style Light Lager	Old Milwaukee Light
2007	Silver	American Style Light Lager	Pabst Blue Ribbon Light
2007	Silver	American-Style Cream Ale or Lager	Old Style
2008	Gold	American Style Cream Ale or Lager	Lone Star
2008	Gold	American Style Lager or Premium Lager	Olympia
2008	Silver	American Style Light Lager	Old Milwaukee Light
2008	Silver	American Style Lager or Premium Lager	Blatz
2010	Silver	American Style Lager or Light Lager	Old Milwaukee
2010	Silver	American Style Specialty Lager or Cream Ale or Lager	Rainier
2010	Bronze	American Style Specialty Lager or Cream Ale or Lager	Old Style
2011	Gold	American-Style Lager, Light Lager or Premium Lager	Old Milwaukee Light
2011	Bronze	American-Style Lager, Light Lager or Premium Lager	Pabst Blue Ribbon Light
2011	Silver	American Style Specialty Lager or Cream Ale or Lager	Rainier
2011	Bronze	American Style Specialty Lager or Cream Ale or Lager	Old Style
2012	Gold	American-Style Lager, Light Lager or Premium Lager	Pabst Blue Ribbon
2012	Silver	American Style Specialty Lager or Cream Ale or Lager	Old Style
2016	Gold	American-Style Lager, Light Lager or Premium Lager	Pabst Blue Ribbon

Awards at the World Beer Cup:

Year	Award	Category	Beer
1996	Gold	American Style Malt Liquor	Olde English 800
1996	Silver	American Style Malt Liquor	Schlitz Malt Liquor
1996	Bronze	American Style Malt Liquor	Country Club Malt Liquor
1996	Bronze	American Style Ice Lager	Schlitz Ice
1998	Gold	American Style Malt Liquor	Schlitz Malt Liquor
2006	Gold	American Style Premium Lager	Pabst Blue Ribbon
2006	Gold	American Cream Ale or Lager	Old Style
2008	Gold	American-Style Cream Ale or Lager	Special Export
2008	Gold	American-Style Light Lager	Old Milwaukee Light
2008	Silver	American-Style Cream Ale or Lager	Lone Star
2008	Silver	American-Style Light Lager	Lone Star Light
2010	Gold	American-Style Lager	Olympia
2010	Silver	American-Style Cream Ale or Lager	Old Style
2010	Silver	American-Style Lager	National Bohemian
2010	Bronze	American-Style Cream Ale or Lager	Lone Star
2010	Bronze	American-Style Specialty Lager	Colt 45

Golden Icon Awards by Travolta Family Entertainment:

Year	Award	Category	Beer
2006–2007	Golden Icon	Best Domestic Beer	Old Style Light

Pabst Brewing Company won "Large Brewing Company of the Year" at the Great American Beer Festival in 2011, 2012 and 2016.

== Advertisements ==
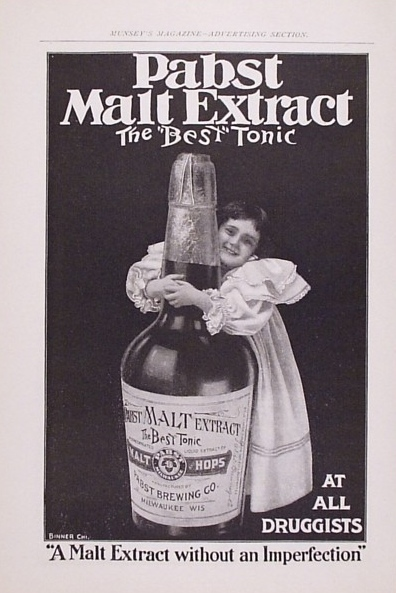
Pabst Malt Extract 1896

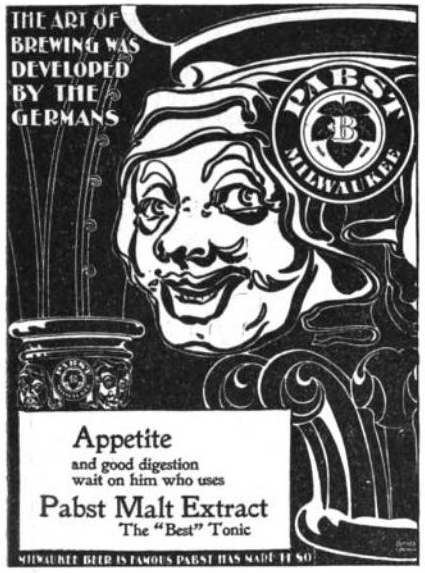
Pabst Malt Extract 1897

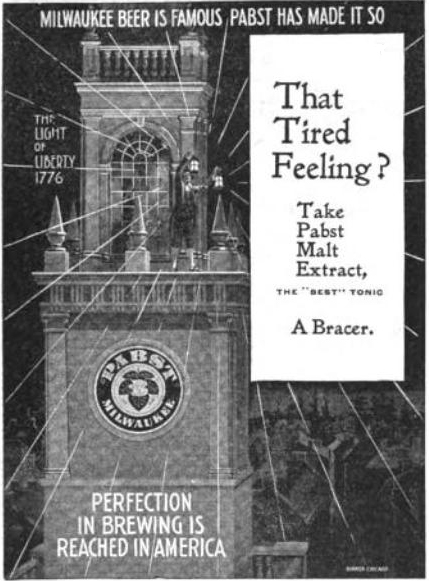
Pabst Malt Extract - Advertisement - 1897

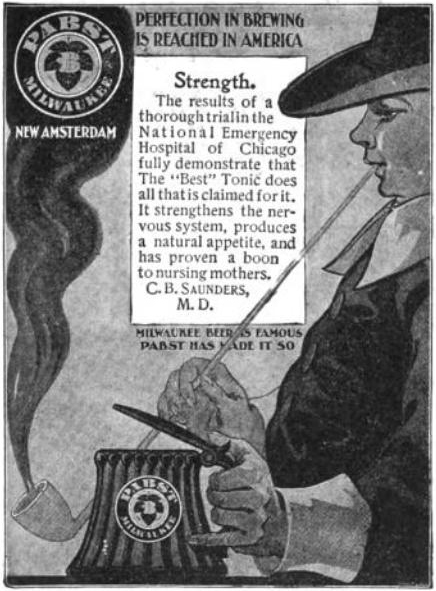
Pabst New Amsterdam - Advertisement - 1897

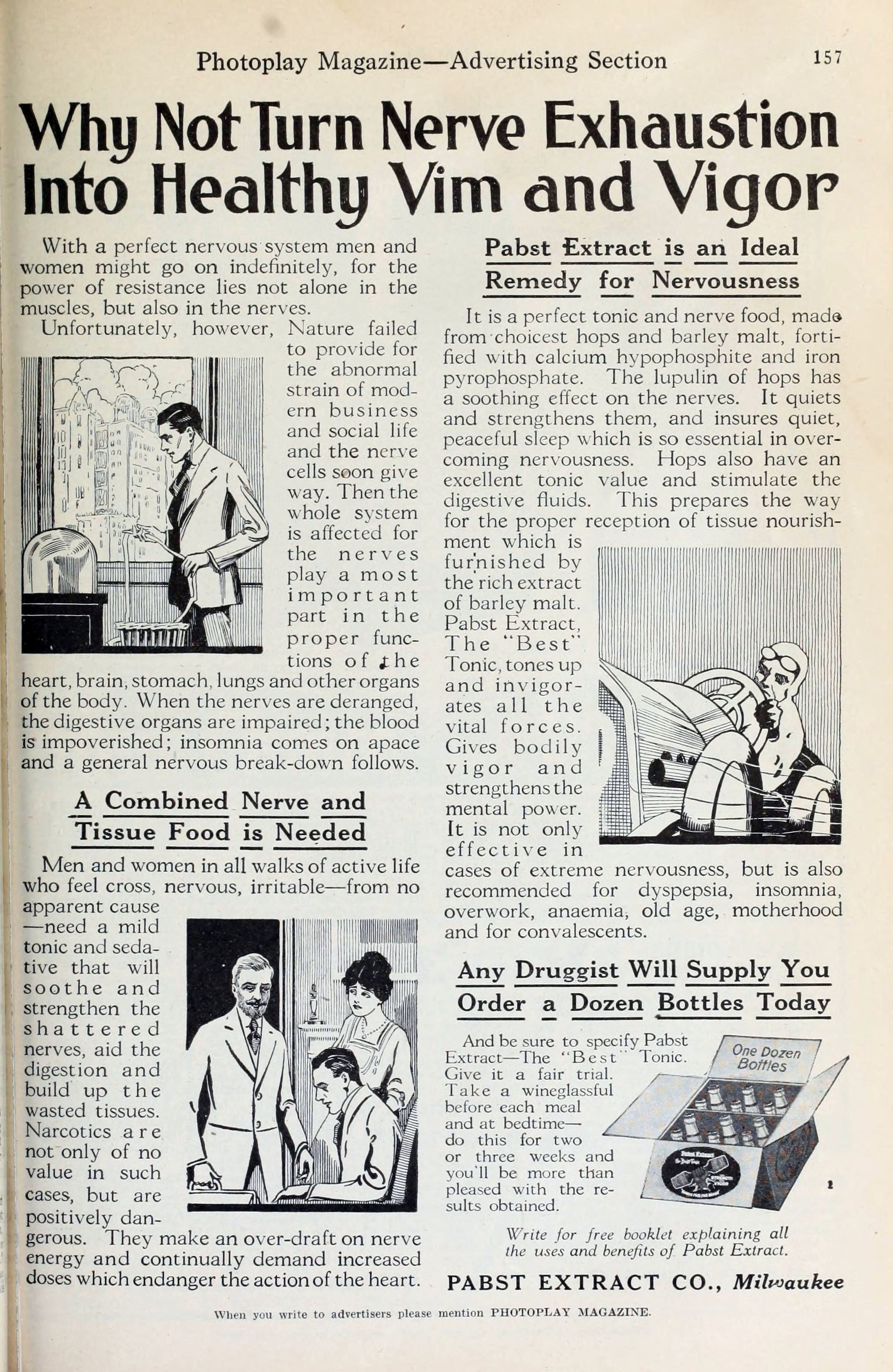
Pabst Extract 1917

== See also ==
- Beer in Milwaukee
