= King Gambrinus (sculpture) =

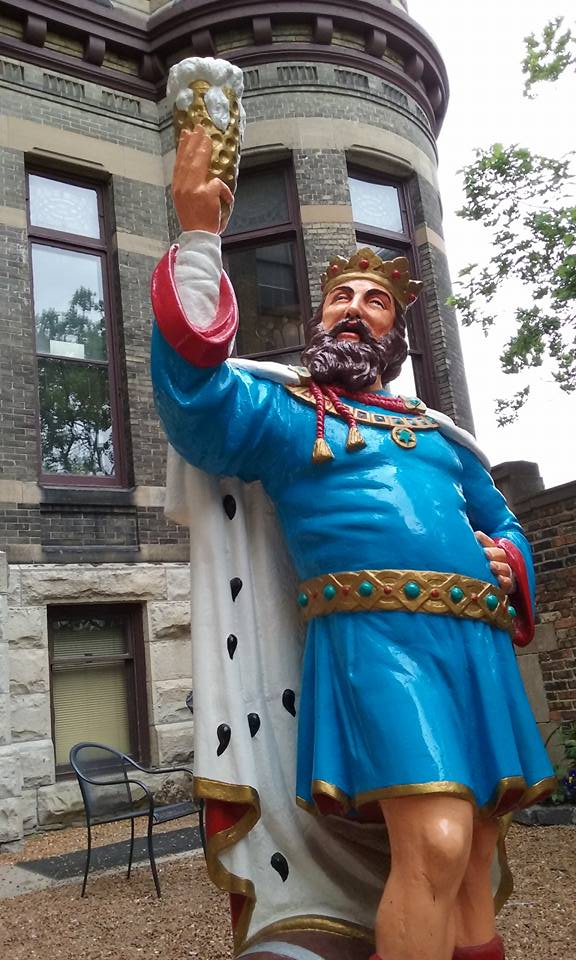
- Artist: Carl Kuehns
- Year: 1967
- Dimensions: 240 cm (96 in)
- Location: Best Place Brewery courtyard, Milwaukee; 43°2′44.701″N 87°55′23.88″W

King Gambrinus can refer to a number of statues made by different artists in the United States depicting the European folk hero Gambrinus. They were designed as ornamentation for brewery buildings. The trend began in European, where there are many other sculptures of Gambrinus adorning brew-houses and breweries.

King Gambrinus was a wooden statue carved around 1857 by American artist Gustav Haug and installed on the roof of the Pabst Brewhouse in Wisconsin. Artist Carl Kuehns later created a wooden copy in 1872. By 1966, it had rotted and a new cast aluminum version was made, it stood at the brewery until 1996. It now stands at the Best Place at the Historic Pabst Brewery in Milwaukee, outside the Guest Center.

King Gambrinus also refers to about a dozen large zinc statues that were sculpted and cast in the 19th century by J. W. Fiske & Company for use as architectural statues on brewery buildings in the United States. Five are known to still exist, four are in museums.

== Kuehns sculpture ==
The statue features a standing, bearded King Gambrius in blue clothing with a red and white cape holding a flagon of beer in his right hand. The figure wears black boots, a studded belt, and a crown. He directs his gaze toward the uplifted glass of beer and rests his other hand on his thick waist. Behind his feet rests a wooden beer barrel. The painted metal sculpture weighs 900 lbs.

The original King Gambrinus was carved in wood by Gustav Haug and installed at the roof peak of the Pabst Brewhouse in 1857. The company grew quickly and expanded its complex such that by 1872 a new statue was needed. Carl Kuehns, a carver with the Matthew Brothers Furniture Company, created a copy of Haug's wooden sculpture and the new work was installed atop an archway leading to the loading yard. The wooden sculpture gradually deteriorated, and in 1966, the new cast aluminum version was commissioned. It stood atop the entrance to the brewery's Stirnewert until 1996, when the brewery closed. The original wood sculpture by Kuehns was sold to a developer in Ozaukee County. From 1997 to 2004, the aluminum statue was stored at Milwaukee's Miller Brewing, a contract brewer for Pabst.

The King Gambrinus statue was removed in 1996 upon the closing of the Pabst Brewery. From 2004 to 2011, the statue was installed in the employee cafeteria at the Illinois headquarters of Pabst. Best Place operator Jim Haertel negotiated a loan of the sculpture to return it to its original site.

== Fiske statues ==
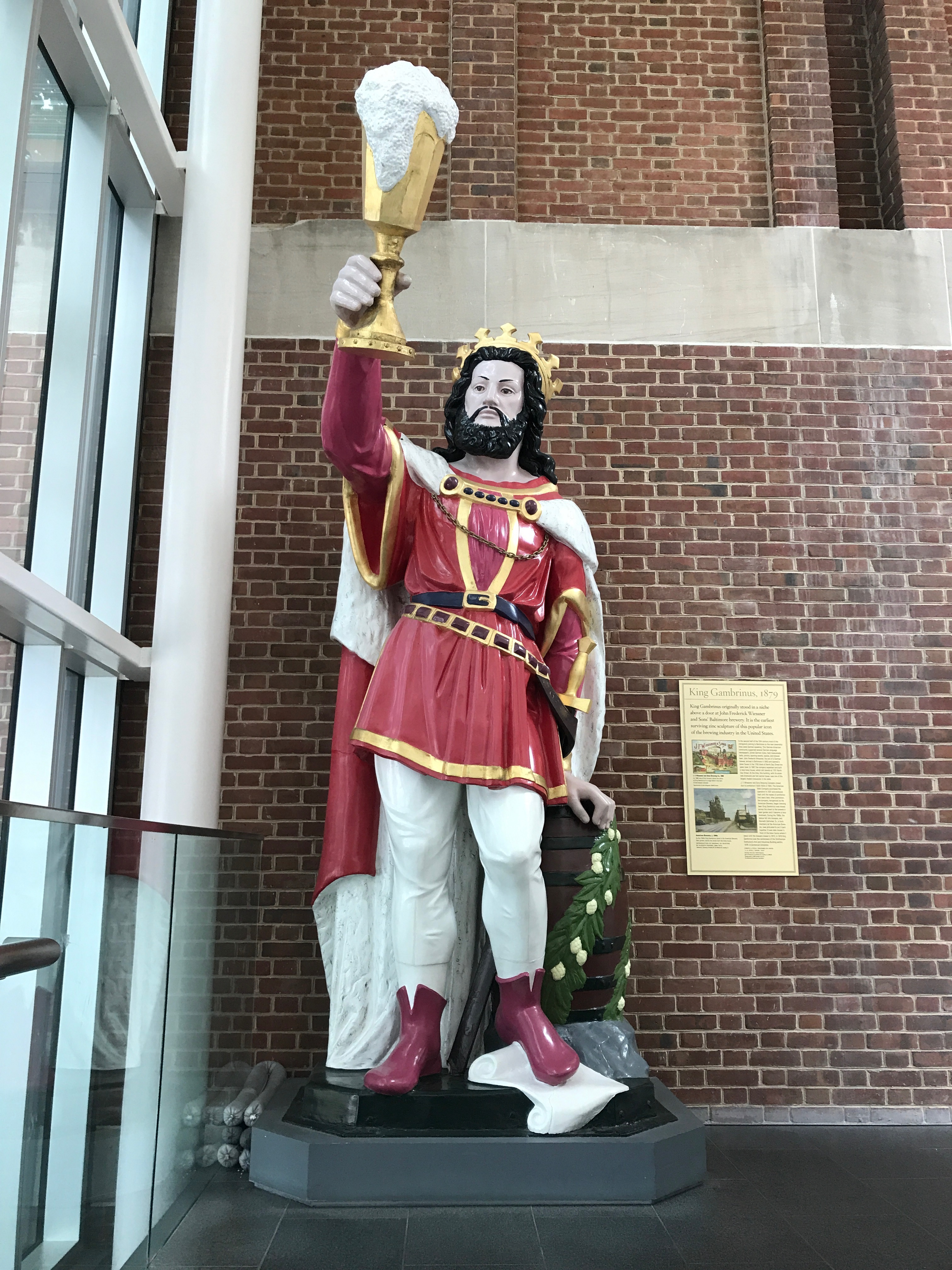
Typical Fiske statue. From the J. F. Wiessner & Sons brewery in Baltimore, now at the Maryland Center for History and Culture

Beginning in the 1870s, J. W. Fiske & Company of Brooklyn, New York began selling a 11.5-foot tall zinc statue of King Gambrinus. They sold the sculpted mold to metal foundries which poured the zinc, painted it, and sold the final product. The statues were identical, but the color schemes were bespoke, or customers had the choice not to paint. They were purchased by 19th century brewery owners to be mounted outside on a ledge or roof overlooking the brewery. They are believed to be the largest zinc trade statues made in the 19th century, weighing over 800 pounds. There were more than a dozen statues sold from the 1870s through 1890s. The known breweries and extant statues include: J. F. Wiessner & Sons in Baltimore, Maryland (now at the Maryland Center for History and Culture; red and white); Diamond State Brewery in Wilmington, Delaware (now at the Delaware History Museum; red and blue); Beverwyck Brewery in Albany, New York (now at the Samuel Adams Brewery in Breinigsville, Pennsylvania; unpainted); Haberle Congress Brewery in Syracuse, New York (now at the Onondaga Historical Association; green and tan); Narragansett Brewery in Cranston, Rhode Island (now at the Model Museum of Science and Industry in Toluca, Mexico; unpainted).

== See also ==
- Pabst Brewery Complex
