= J. F. Wiessner & Sons =

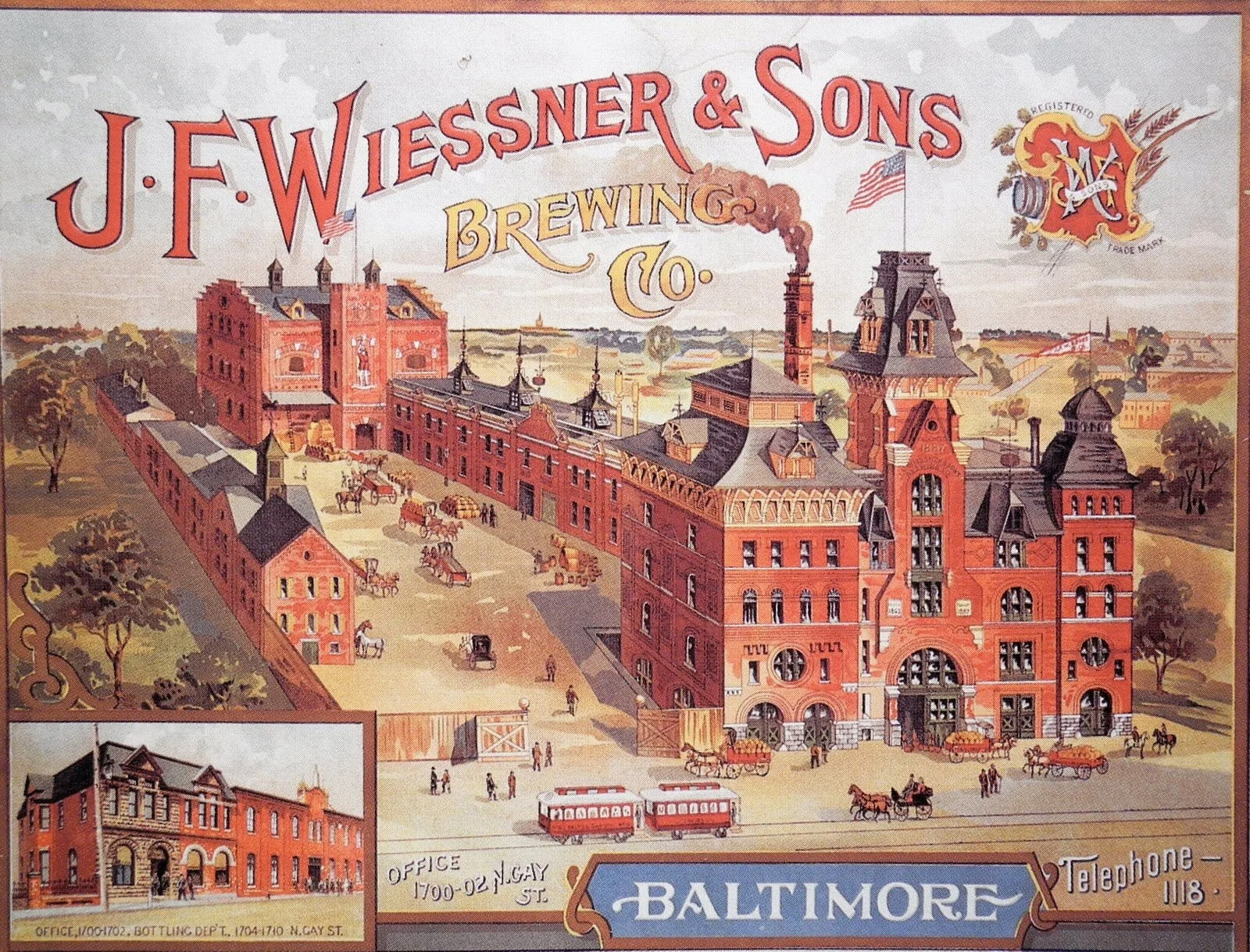
Wiessner brewery building c. 1890. Later called the American Brewery.

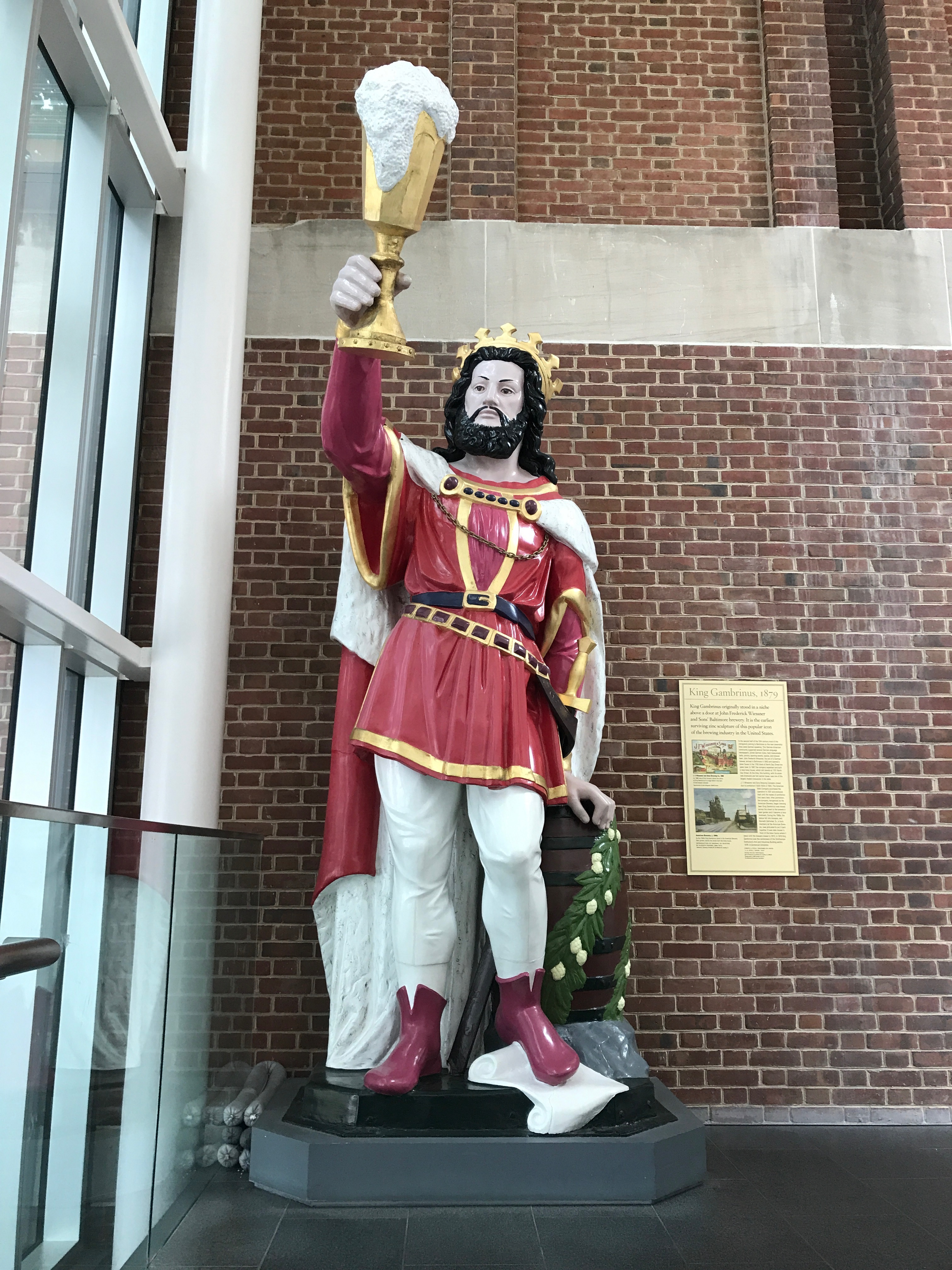
The 800-lb 11.5-foot tall zinc-cast King Gambrinus was a symbol of good luck and success that once stood on an exterior ledge overlooking the front door of the brewery.

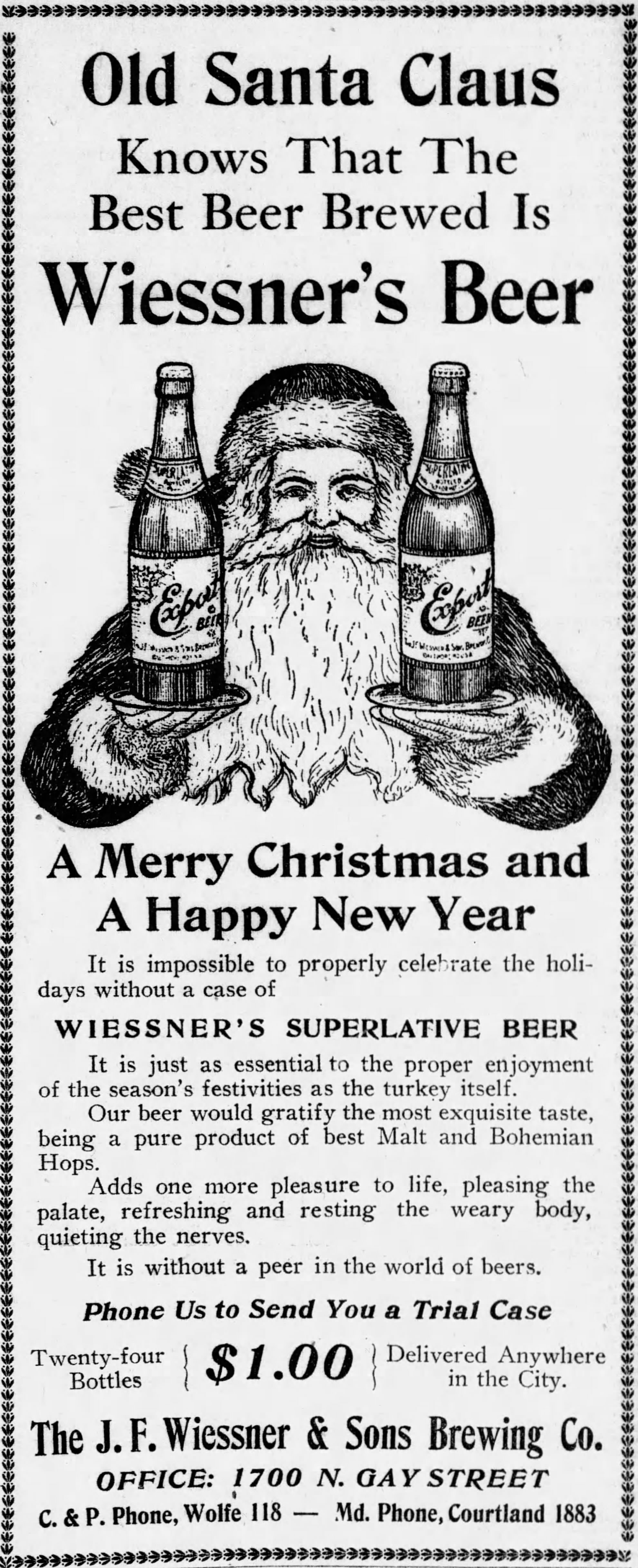
Superlative Beer. The "Export" label often meant no refrigeration required making it suitable for keeping bottles in home

The J. F. Wiessner & Sons brewery was founded in 1863 in Baltimore, Maryland by German immigrant John Frederick Wiessner (1831-1897). The Wiessner brewery became an important part of the local German immigrant community. The business had a reputation for high-quality, premium-priced lager, leading to rapid growth. This success culminated in the construction of a massive and ornate Teutonic-style brewhouse, a city landmark that was a showcase of modern brewing technology. The expansion solidified the brewery as one of the largest and most popular in Maryland. After Wiessner's death, his sons took over.

The brewery continued to prosper under the next generation but was forced to cease operations with the onset of Prohibition. After a failed attempt to produce non-alcoholic beer, the Wiessner family sold the facility, which reopened after Prohibition's repeal under new owners as the American Brewery which operated until the 1973. The Wiessner family's influence on Baltimore's brewing industry included the founder's brother and brother-in-law who also ran major local breweries, and there were Wiessner nephews who ran breweries.

== History ==
=== Early years ===
John Frederick Wiessner was born in Uehlfeld, Bavaria, on December 14, 1831, the son of a brewer. After learning the trade, he immigrated to the United States in 1853 and settled in Baltimore, where he became the brewmaster for George Röst. Röst was the "godfather" of Bavarian lager brewing in Baltimore, having pioneered the building of catacombs underneath city streets that were kept sufficiently cold for lagering beer using ice imported from Maine; historically this was done in Bavarian mountain caves. In 1858, Wiessner married his wife, Sarah. Desiring more than a simple life working for Röst, he resigned from his position in 1862 and traveled back to Germany, returning to Baltimore the next year with family loans to start his own brewery.

In 1863, Wiessner founded a brewery on Bel Air Avenue, now 1701 North Gay Street, beginning with a three-story brewhouse that produced about 1,500 barrels of beer annually. Wiessner chose to brew only lager, which is a process of long cold-fermentation, followed by a near-freezing storage ("lagering") period. It produces a crisp, clean taste. The process can take a month or longer. In 1860, about 1/3rd of breweries in Germany made lager, but by 1870 it was over 80%, reflecting the rapid domination of lager in the market, a trend just beginning in the USA, where it was called Bavarian or German beer. Lager in this period was dark; pale lagers became popular by the end of the century.

The Wiessner brewery was central to the surrounding German immigrant neighborhoods, serving as an employer, and a supplier to the popular Schuetzen Park, which opened next door in 1866 with regular community activities, including of course beer-drinking. The business grew rapidly; by 1882, John Sr. had brought his son John Jr. into the company, and annual production reached 20,000 barrels.

The brewery built a reputation for quality, due in part to its head brewmaster, John George Neumeister. Arriving from Bavaria in 1885, Neumeister held the position for 36 years until Prohibition. He was known as a "hard taskmaster" who insisted on exacting standards. This commitment to quality, focused solely on producing lager, allowed the beer to command a premium price of $6.50 per barrel, significantly higher than the common local price of $4.50.

=== New brewery and expansion ===
By 1887, with annual production already at 40,000 barrels, the business had outgrown its original building. To expand, Wiessner constructed a new five-story brewhouse designed by the pioneering German brewing architect, Charles Stoll. The new building was an ornate example of "Teutonic Brewery" architecture, distinguished by a central seven-story tower that housed a 10,000-bushel grain elevator. The six-acre site included a cooperage shop, a bottling house, stables, and underground brick tunnels, resembling catacombs, that could store tens of thousands of barrels of beer. With its expanded brewing capacity, the plant became one of the largest in Maryland. A central purpose of the new building was to house two massive Carl von Linde ice-making and refrigeration machines. These units were among the first in Baltimore and generated "considerable interest and discussion." The new technology allowed cooling rooms to be placed on the top floor, enabling a more efficient gravity-fed brewing process and freeing up the ground floor for packing and shipping.

As bottled beer grew in acceptance, the company created an in-house bottling division in 1886. In 1891, John Sr. brought his other sons into the business, incorporated it, and renamed it J. F. Wiessner & Sons. The brewery complex expanded again in 1892 with the addition of a wagon house and stables to support regular beer deliveries throughout the city. In 1896, the family built an unattached three-story residence across the street at 1636 North Gay St. In keeping with a custom of the time, the Wiessner residence was large enough to provide lodging for workers newly arrived from Germany.

A notable feature of the brewery was the 11.5-foot-tall, 800-pound zinc-cast statue of King Gambrinus, the mythical patron of brewers, which was perched on a ledge overlooking the brewery front door. The statue mold was sculpted by J. W. Fiske & Company of Brooklyn, New York. Although over a dozen castings were sold to breweries around the country, only five are known to have survived, four are now in museums, including the Wiessner's statue held at the Maryland Center for History and Culture.

John F. Wiessner Sr. died on January 1, 1897, leaving an estate of $1,500,000 divided equally to each of his five children. His oldest son, John F. Wiessner Jr., assumed the presidency of the company.

=== Final years ===
John F. Wiessner Jr. died on September 22, 1906, at the age of 47 of Bright's disease (kidney failure), he had no children. His brother, George F. Wiessner, succeeded him as president and continued to grow the brewery, producing its popular "Superlative"-brand beer. Under George's leadership, the company continued to modernize. In 1909, following a national trend, the brewery began using gasoline-powered trucks for bottled beer deliveries. Nevertheless, the Wiessner's were great lovers of horses and continue to use them well past 1915. Stories describe the care and attention they gave the horses, ensuring they were never over-worked, had the best feed and veterinary care, the tack and wagons were kept in like-new condition; they were meant to look clean and beautiful traveling through the city streets. Henry Wiessner, who was in charge of the horses, used to say, "I want the horses here treated as well as any man," recognizing they were one his best marketing vehicles, not unlike the Budweiser Clydesdales.

The company reached a peak production of 110,000 barrels in 1919, the year before Prohibition forced it to cease production. A brief attempt to make non-alcoholic "near-beer" was unsuccessful and they stopped work entirely in 1924. After George F. Wiessner died in 1925, his younger brother, Henry F. Wiessner, became president of a shuttered factory. In January 1931, Henry sold the brewery to the American Malt Company, owned by Daniel FitzSimons and his brothers, which used the plant to produce malt for home brewing and other purposes. With the repeal of Prohibition in 1933, the new owners reverted the plant back to beer production, renaming it the American Brewery. This company continued to brew beer at the location until 1973, after which the building was abandoned. The same year the building complex was added to the National Register of Historic Places.

=== Brewing connections ===
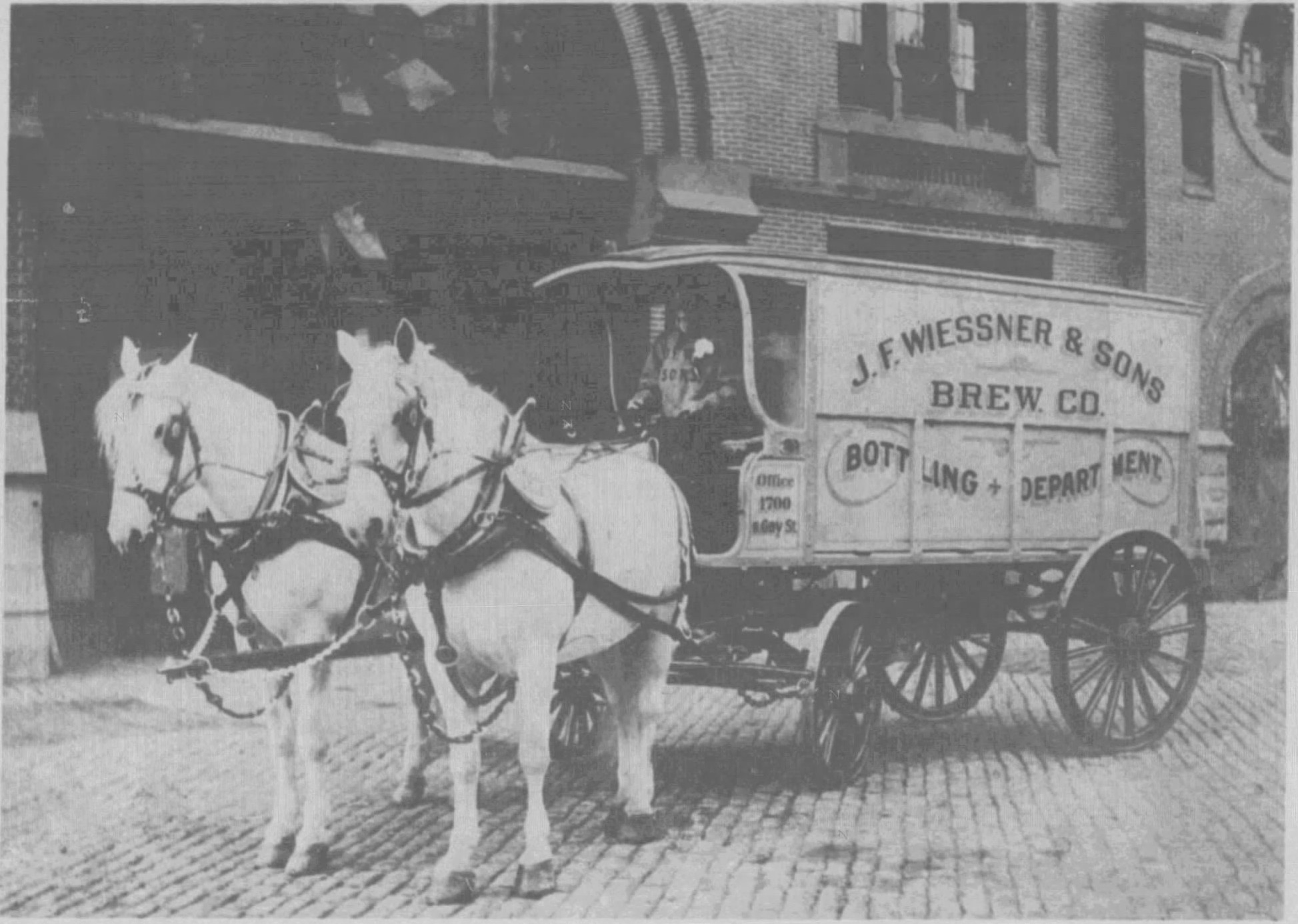
J. F. Wiessner delivery c. 1915

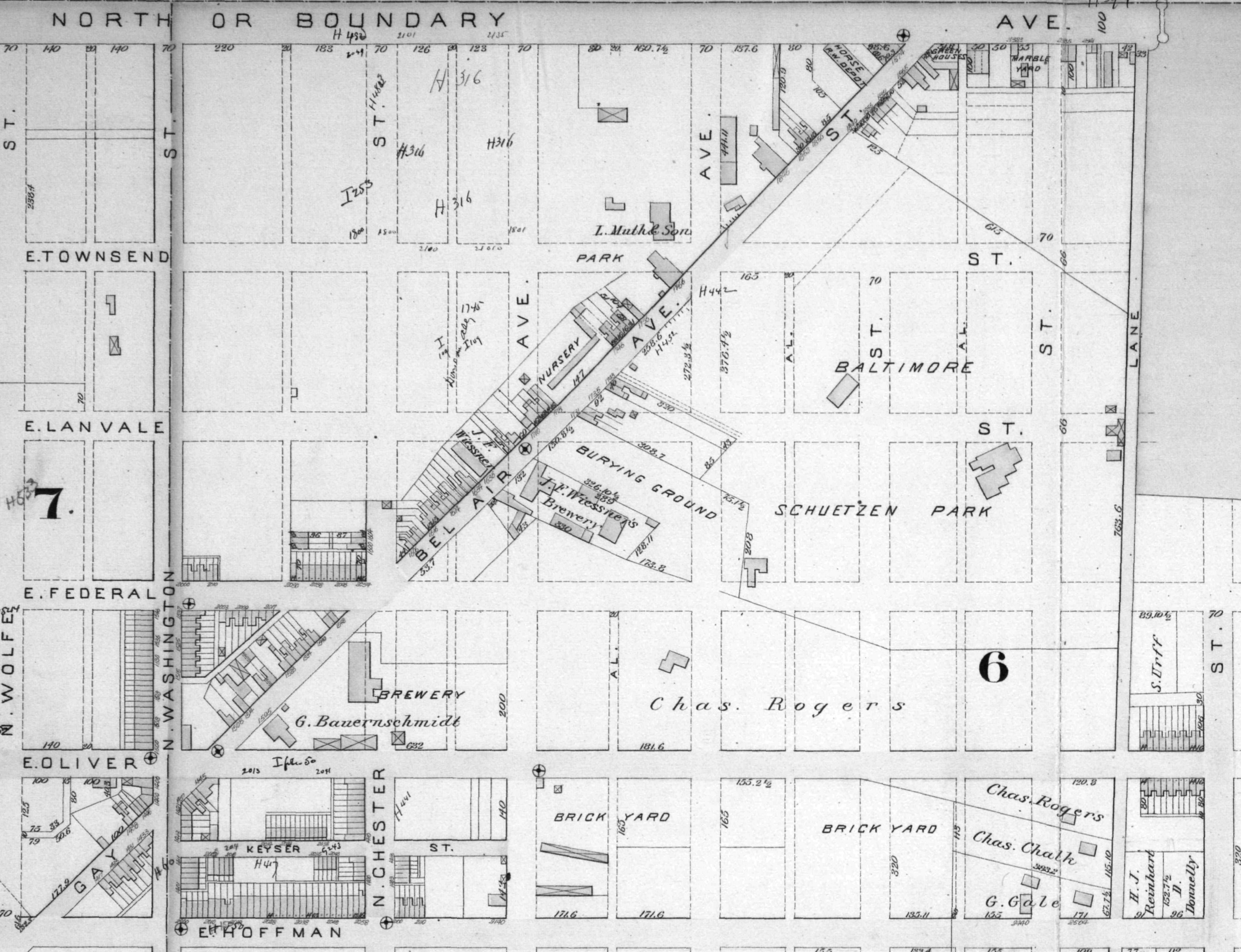
1882 map shows the brewery as the city street grid creeps north.

Brewing family connections existed between John F. Wiessner Sr. and his sister's husband, George Bauernschmidt. In 1864, Bauernschmidt established the George Bauernschmidt Brewing Company, also known as the Greenwood Brewery, just one block southwest of Wiessner's operation. The two brewers' careers ran on parallel tracks. They started a brewery within one year of each other (1863 and 1864). Around 1887, at the same time that Wiessner was expanding, Bauernschmidt also built a fantastically large brewery. Both new plants were considered showcase buildings of the era, had the latest ice and refrigeration machines, produced similar volumes of beer, and the two men were known for learning from and keeping pace with each other throughout their careers. John Sr.'s nephew, Frederick Bauernschmidt, went on to build the largest brewery in Baltimore prior to Prohibition, the American Brewery, which produced an astounding 400,000 barrels per year. Because of Prohibition, Frederick sold his brewery.

John F. Wiessner's older brother, George F. Wiessner (1826-1870), came to America in 1854, a year after John. In 1869, George established the Fort Marshall Brewing Company in Highlandtown, Baltimore, at the site of the abandoned Civil War Fort Marshall on the southeast corner of Eastern and Highland Avenue. After George's unexpected death in 1870, his wife Elizabeth and her second husband Andrew Hoenervogt (1844-1876) ran the brewery. When Hoenervogt also died a few years later, George's two sons, John F. and Christopher William, took over the company, renaming it the John F. Wiessner & Brothers Brewing Company. Then C. William died in 1891, leaving his brother John as the sole proprietor. John sold the brewery in 1899, to the Maryland Brewing Company trust, but after the trust failed, he bought the brewery back in 1901 and opened the Crystal Ice Factory at the same location. John, who was sickly and close to his mother, died in 1904, unwed and childless. He left a large estate from the sale of the brewery. After building a large mausoleum for his family, he gifted most of his fortune to establish an orphanage in Eastern Baltimore. The ice factory dissolved within a year, but the orphanage lasted until 1980. The institution itself continues to operate today, raising money and funding organizations dedicated to helping children. It was renamed the John F. Wiessner Foundation in 1989 and later the Wiessner Foundation for Children in 1996.

In 1934, the Wiessner family tried to open the new brewery, J. F. Wiessner & Son Brewing Company (singular son), at 1732 North Chester, but it never got off the ground and likely never produced any product.

In 1950, a new brewing company started in Baltimore called the Wiessner Brewing Company, owned by Morton Sarubin who was trying to capitalize on the recognizable name. It had no immediate connection to the Wiessner family, however the brewmaster was Fred Nuemiester, son of the Wiessner's famed brewmaster, John George Neumeister. A full-page newspaper advertisement showed a photograph of John Neumeister and tried to draw a connection with the reputation of Nuemiester and Wiessner beer. Nevertheless, the brand never caught on and it went out of business two years later.

== Brands and company names ==
Wiessner sold lagers. The "Superlative Beer" brand was its mainstay.

- Superlative Beer - blue label, called a dark lager in adverts
- Pale Superlative Beer - red label, a pale lager
- Pilsner Style Beer - pilsner a variety of pale lager
- Superlative Export Beer - "export" beers, originally for shipping overseas, had higher hops and alcohol content, and pasteurization after the 1870s. Significantly, they could be stored at home and hotels without refrigeration.
- Superlative Bock Beer - Bock beer was a seasonal high alcohol beer, often for May Day festivities.

The company went by different names depending on the period:

- 1863-1891: John F. Wiessner (aka J. F. Wiessner)
- 1888-1891: John F. Wiessner & Sons (aka J. F. Wiessner & Sons)
- 1891-1920: John F. Wiessner & Sons Brewing Company (aka J. F. Wiessner & Sons Brewing Company)
- 1934-1934: J. F. Wiessner & Son Brewing Company (no products)
