= Bauernschmidt =

Bauernschmidt is a surname. Notable people with the surname include:

- Amy Bauernschmidt, American naval officer
- George Bauernschmidt (1835-1899), German-American brewer from Baltimore
- Frederick Bauernschmidt (1864–1933), American brewer and philanthropist
- Marie Bauernschmidt (1875-1962), Baltimore political reformer
