= Schuetzen Park =

Schuetzen Park can refer to:

- Schuetzen Park (Baltimore), two parks in Southwest and Eastern Baltimore
- Schuetzen Park (Iowa) in Davenport
- Schuetzen Park (New Jersey) in North Bergen
- Schuetzen Park (Washington, D.C.)
- Schutzen Park in Glendale, Queens, New York, which in the 19th century was spelled as both 'Schuetzen Park' and 'Scheutzen Park'
