= Beverwyck Brewery =

Brewery in Albany, New York

Beverwyck Brewing Company
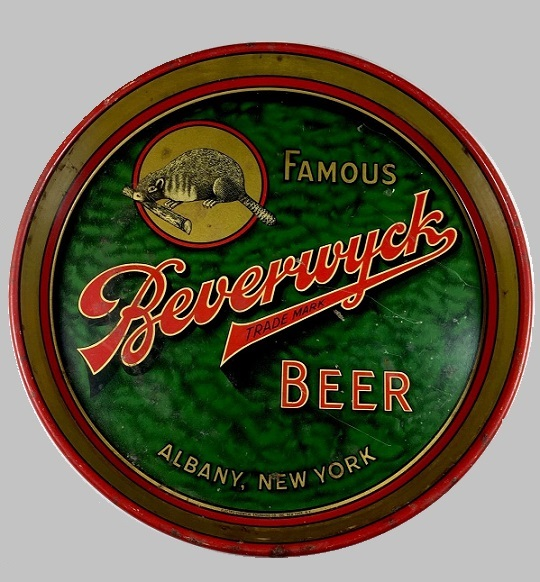
- An old metal serving tray, advertising Beverwyck Beer
- Industry: Alcoholic beverage
- Founded: 1878
- Defunct: 1972
- Headquarters: Albany, New York; United States
- Products: Beer

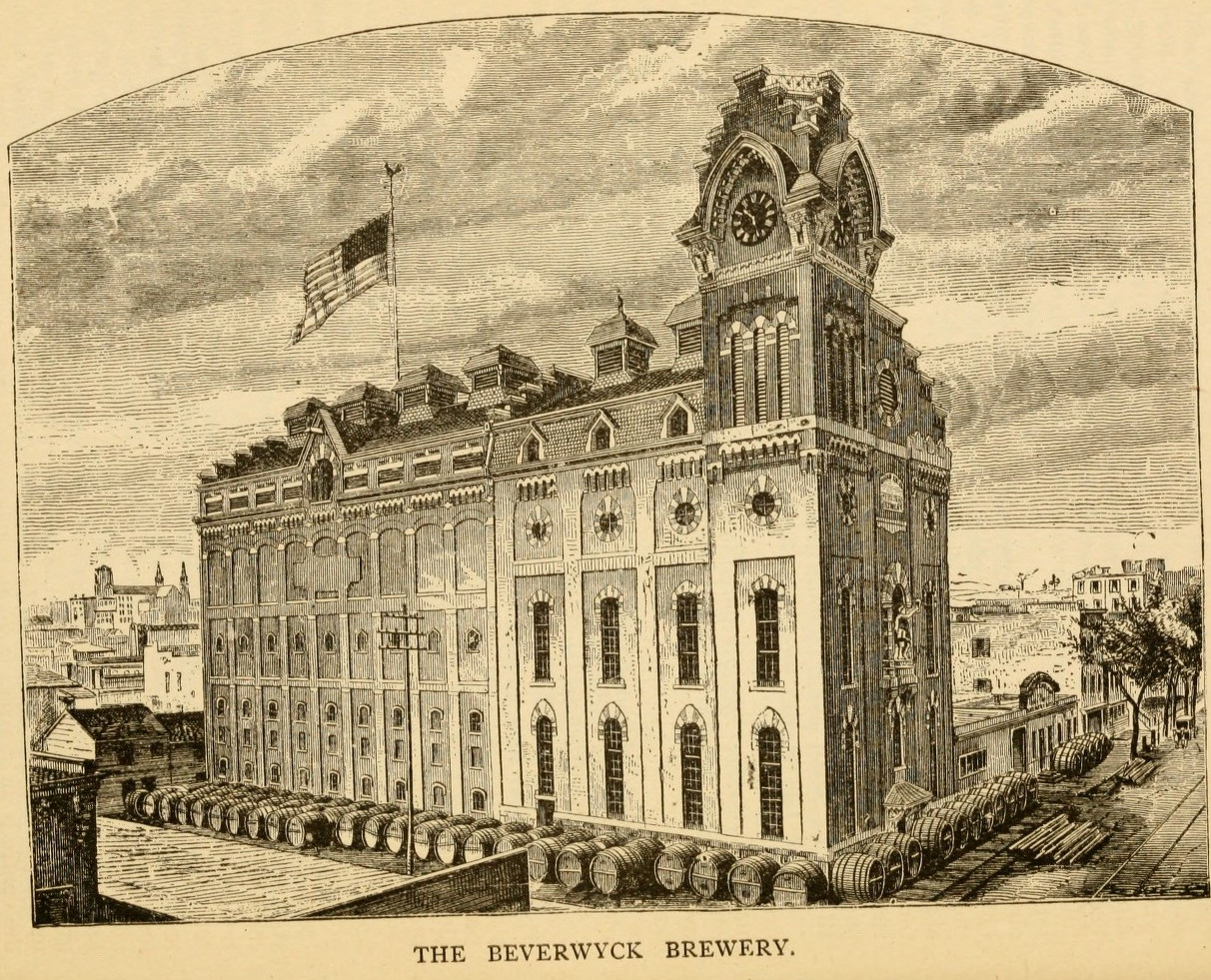
Beverwyck Brewery "Teutonic-style" building ca. 1884. The statue of the king is visible over the front door.

Beverwyck Brewing Company was founded in 1878 at 30/52 North Ferry Street, in Albany, New York. It was founded by Michael N. Nolan, a two-term mayor of Albany, as well as elected to the 47th United States Congress representing the Sixteenth District of New York.

The colossal "Teutonic-style" brewery building on North Ferry Street cost $350,000 and was designed by brewery architect Charles Stoll & Son. It was only for lager, unusual for the time because most beer was ale; lager was only beginning to catch on, made possible by newly developed ice and refrigeration machines. Prior to the creation of Beverywyck, the company did business as Quinn and Nolan, producing smaller quantities of ale and porter the traditional way, which they continued after the formation of Beverwyck, but at a different brewery across the street. At the time, the Beverwyck building was considered the model lager brewery "in the United States if not the world", catering to a new taste for a lighter crisper beer. The modern brewery attracted visitors from around the country. It had a 230-foot deep well in the middle of the factory, and many modern innovations for industrial scale beer production. Its initial capacity was 90,000 barrels a year. Delivery of casks throughout the city was made with a stable of 40 horses and carriages.

The brewery produced lager beer from 1878 until prohibition in 1920. During prohibition Beverwyck had a license to produce non-alcoholic beverages. It was one of the three breweries in Albany to survive prohibition, the others being J.F. Hedrick and Dobler Brewing. During World War II, it was one of forty breweries in the USA that shipped beer to troops overseas, and most of the Beverwyck beer, in green cans, went to soldiers in the Pacific theater.

The company installed an 11.5-foot-tall, 800-pound zinc-cast statue of King Gambrinus, the mythical patron of brewers; it stood perched on an outside ledge over-watching the front door of the brewery. It was cast by J. W. Fiske & Company of Brooklyn, New York and over a dozen were sold to breweries around the country, only five are known to still exist. The Beverwyck statue is on display at the Samuel Adams Brewery in Breinigsville, Pennsylvania, the only statue remaining not in a museum.

In 1933 Beverwyck re-opened with 6 products. Beverwyck India Ale and Porter were produced from 1933 through 1944, while Beverwyck Ale, Bock, Beer and Irish Cream Ale were produced from 1933 to 1950. In the mid-1940s, the company added a streamlined bottling plant and stock house which nearly doubled the production capacity. Bevewyck used the tag line "Beverwyck, Best Beer Brewed" and had as its logo a shield, with BBBB placed diagonally on the shield.

In 1950, the brewery was acquired by the F. & M. Schaefer Brewing Company of Brooklyn, New York which produced Schaefer Beer, one of the most popular brands in the country.

F. & M. Schaefer closed the brewery in 1972 because it was inefficient compared to Schaefer's newer breweries. The building was demolished in 1976, but Stoll's one-hundred-year-old Teutonic structure failed to collapse with controlled demolitions, it took months to remove it brick by brick.
