= Baltimore East/South Clifton Park Historic District =

Historic district in Maryland, United States

- U.S. National Register of Historic Places
- U.S. Historic district
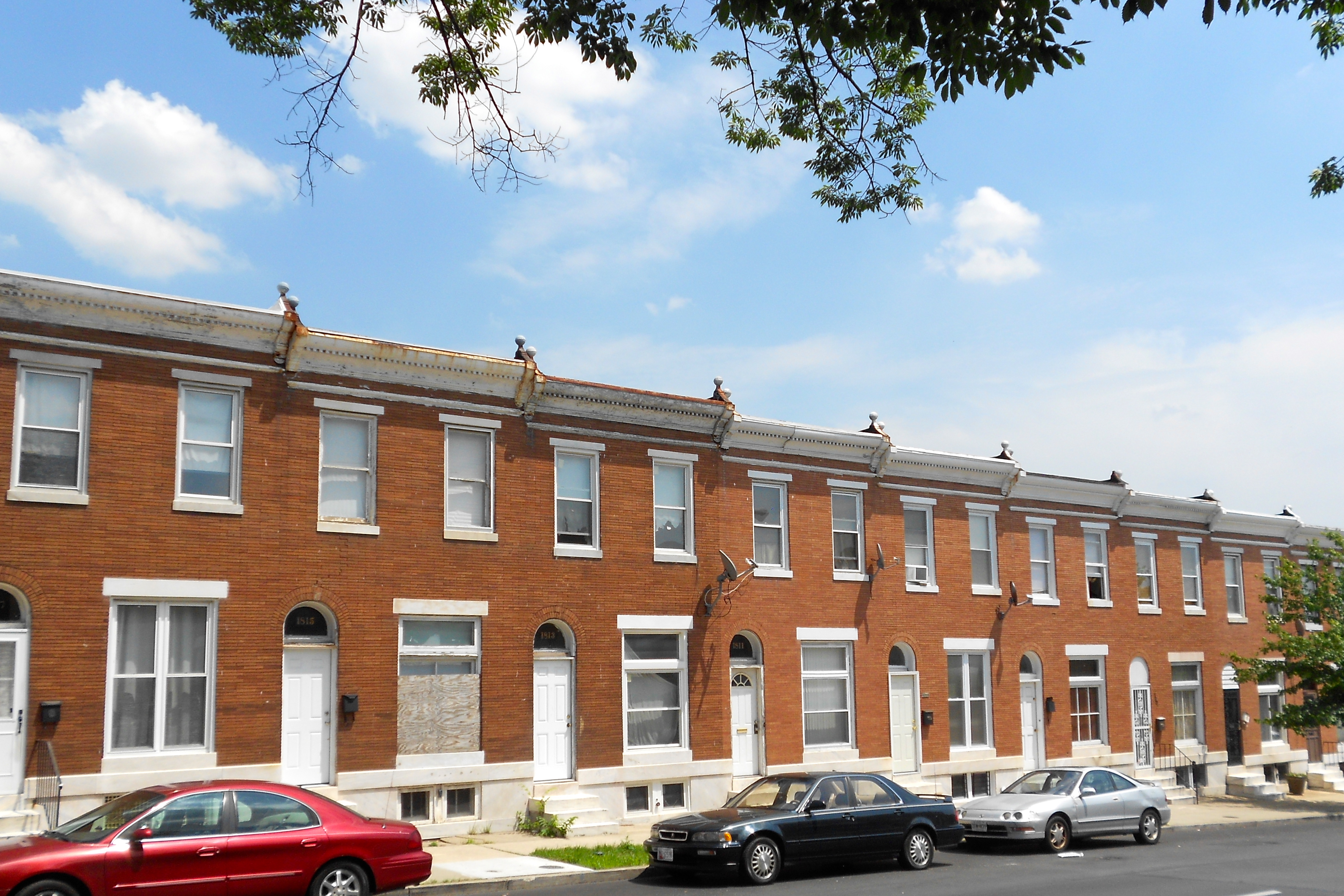
- Row houses at Lanvale & Washington

- Location within Baltimore Location within Maryland Location within the United States
- Location: Roughly bounded by Clifton Park, N. Broadway, E. Chase St., and N. Rose St., Baltimore, Maryland
- Coordinates: 39°18′33″N 76°35′22″W
- Area: 440 acres (180 ha)
- Architectural style: Italianate, Romanesque, et al.
- NRHP reference No.: 02001611
- Added to NRHP: December 27, 2002

Baltimore East/South Clifton Park Historic District is a national historic district in Baltimore, Maryland, United States. It is primarily an urban residential area organized in a gridiron pattern. It comprises approximately 110 whole and partial blocks that formed the historic northeast corner of the City of Baltimore prior to 1888. While rowhouses dominate the urban area, the historic district also contains other property types which contribute to its character including brewing, meat packing, cigar manufacturing, printing, and a tobacco warehouse. The Baltimore Cemetery completes the historic district.

It was added to the National Register of Historic Places in 2002.

== History ==
From 1866 to 1895, the former Schuetzen Park was a nexus of German immigrant community activity, functioning as a sort of club for the lower and middle classes. It featured rifle and archery ranges, picnic areas, bowling alleys, a ballroom, dining halls, and beer gardens, and annual events such as May Day, all involving lots of beer from the local breweries. The park boundaries were North Milton and North Patterson Park Avenues and East Federal and East Lafayette Street, with an entrance off Belair Road.

Between the 1890s and the 1910s, many new homes were constructed in the neighborhood for Bohemian immigrants. Areas with Bohemian owners included the 1500 block of North Durham Street, 1700 block of Crystal Street, 1700 block of North Register Street, 1100 and 1500 blocks of North Bradford Street, and 1700 and 1800 blocks of North Chapel Street. Czech-American building and loans associations helped Bohemians purchase these homes. Many of the Bohemians attended mass at St. Wenceslaus, a Bohemian Roman Catholic parish in the nearby neighborhood of Little Bohemia. During the 1950s, the area of the neighborhood surrounding North Milton Avenue and North Luzerne Avenue was primarily Polish, German, and Irish.

== See also ==
- Clifton Park, Baltimore
