= Hinchliffe Brewing =

Brewery in Paterson, NJ, US (1861-1920)

- Type: Brewery
- Location: 63 Governor Street, Paterson, New Jersey, USA
- Opened: 1861
- Closed: 1920
- Key people: John Hinchliffe

Hinchliffe Brewing and Malting Company is a historic brewery in Paterson, Passaic County, New Jersey.

== History ==
Hinchliffe Brewing was founded in 1861 by John Hinchliffe. The brewery expanded with new investors, so it was known as Shaw, Hinchliffe, & Penrose. In 1872 the brewery opened a then state-of-the-art malt house on Governor Street, which still stands today, but was partially destroyed by a fire in 1997. In 1878 Thomas Penrose retired and John Shaw bought him out, then in 1881 Shaw passed leaving Hinchliffe as sole owner, until his death in 1886. Hinchliffe's three sons John, William, and James took over operations and in 1890 greatly expanded the operations. They hired the well-known brewery architecture firm Charles Stoll & Son of Brooklyn to draw up plans for the city's largest and most modern brewing facility. The brew house stood five stories tall, built of brick and iron and trimmed with granite, and behind was a modern ice making facility three stories tall. A four-story cold storage facility was also constructed at the time fronting 63 Governor Street. At its peak the brewery produced 75,000 barrels a year. Ultimately, Prohibition caused the end of the brewery in 1920.

After Prohibition, the son of James Hinchliffe, John V. Hinchliffe, became the mayor of Paterson for three terms and helped build Hinchliffe Stadium.

The brewery stood in Paterson until a devastating fire in 1997. The City of Paterson is working on a restoration project.

== See also ==
- Alcohol laws of New Jersey
- Beer in New Jersey
- Beer in the United States
- List of wineries, breweries, and distilleries in New Jersey
- Hinchliffe Stadium
