= Frederick Bauernschmidt =

American brewer and philanthropist (1864–1933)

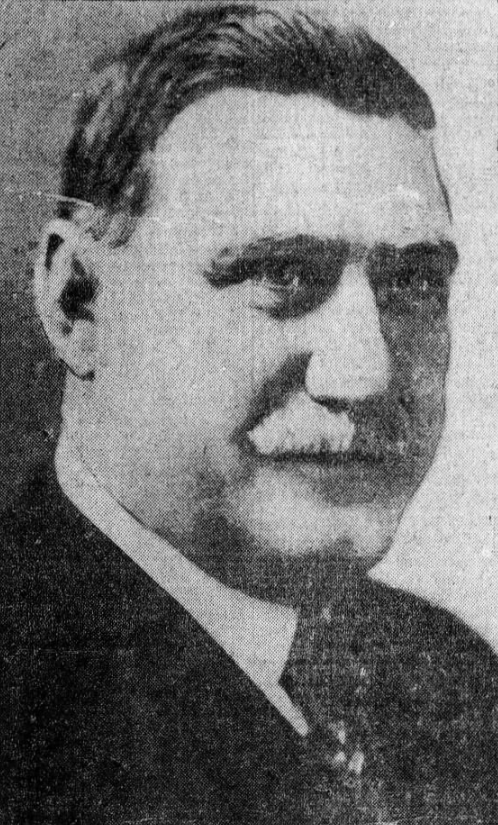
- Bauernschmidt (c. 1927)
- Born: January 10, 1864
- Died: March 8, 1933 (aged 69); Baltimore, Maryland, U.S.
- Resting place: Druid Ridge Cemetery; Baltimore, Maryland, U.S.
- Occupations: Brewer; philanthropist
- Known for: founder of American Brewery
- Spouse: Agnes A. Wehr (m. 1895)

Frederick Bauernschmidt (January 10, 1864 – March 8, 1933) was an American brewer and philanthropist from Maryland. He founded the American Brewery in Baltimore and it operated from 1900 to 1923. He was a son of the Baltimore Bauernschmidt brewing family.

== Early life ==
Frederick Bauernschmidt was born in Baltimore on January 10, 1864, to Margaret (née Wiessner) and George Bauernschmidt. His father was a brewer in Baltimore and his mother's brother was the brewer John Frederick Wiessner of John F. Wiessner & Sons Brewery Company. He was educated in public and private schools.

== Career ==
=== Brewing career ===
Bauernschmidt was made treasurer of George Bauernschmidt Brewery, his father's company, after its incorporation. In 1898, Bauernschmidt's father sold the brewery. Bauernschmidt and his brother William resigned in frustration. Both brothers opened their own breweries following the sale. Their brother John would work for the company that purchased the brewery, the Maryland Brewing Company. His brother William would later join Bauernschmidt's brewery.

Bauernschmidt's brewery was named the American Brewery and was in operation by January 1900 at 1108 Hillen Street in Baltimore. Bauernschmidt competed with Maryland Brewing Company. His brother William would leave American Brewery and his brother John would leave his job at the competing brewery and join the American Brewery. By 1910, the brewery added a bottling plant. At the start of its operation, it was producing 130,000 barrels per year, and by the end of its operation during Prohibition, it was producing 400,000 barrels per year. The business was sold to the American Malt Company at the start of Prohibition, in 1923. Bauernschmidt initially believed Prohibition and the Volstead Act was temporary and paid his employees for three years before selling the company.

Bauernschmidt served as an advisor to the Free State Brewery in the 1930s.

=== Philanthropy ===
In the last six years before his death, Bauernschmidt gave US$2,600,000 to local hospitals. In 1927, Bauernschmidt created a US$600,000 fund for the Frederick Bauernschmidt Memorial Building, an addition to the Union Memorial Hospital. Bauernschmidt acknowledged the gift was inspired by the work Dr. J. M. T. Finney did on his family. In 1929, Bauernschmidt created a US$1,000,000 trust fund that was distributed across multiple hospitals, including Union Memorial Hospital, Johns Hopkins Hospital, Church Home and Infirmary, Hospital for Consumptives of Maryland, Eudowood Sanitarium, Hospital for the Women of Maryland, Home for Incurables, University Hospital, Mercy Hospital, Sinai Hospital, Franklin Square Hospital and South Baltimore General Hospital. In March 1931, Bauernschmidt gave another trust of US$1,000,000 to the Home for Incurables and the Hospital for Consumptives of Maryland at Eudowood. His will left an additional US$1,755,000 to hospitals and charitable organizations, including Johns Hopkins Hospital, Church Home and Infirmary, Union Memorial Hospital and the Hospital for Consumptives of Maryland.

== Personal life ==
Bauernschmidt married Agnes A. Wehr, daughter of August Wehr, on January 30, 1895. They had no children.

In 1909, Bauernschmidt and his wife built a country estate called Bauernschmidt Manor, located at 2316 Bauernschmidt Drive on an undeveloped promontory overlooking the Middle River, an estuary of the Chesapeake Bay in Baltimore County. He also lived at 2450 Eutaw Place in Baltimore, a 12,000 square foot mansion originally built by coal merchant John Knox Shaw in 1895. Bauernschmidt bought the property after Shaw died in 1905, and lived there from approximately 1905 to the 1910s or 1920s. He made significant additions to the property, including a porte-cochère, a driveway, and a new level on the first floor to serve as a music room for orchestra performances.

Bauernschmidt died on March 8, 1933, at his home at 4405 Greenway in Baltimore. He was buried at Druid Ridge Cemetery in Baltimore.
