= Schuetzen Park (Washington, D.C.) =

German-American community recreation area (1866–1891)

Coordinates: 38.9297°N 77.0222°W

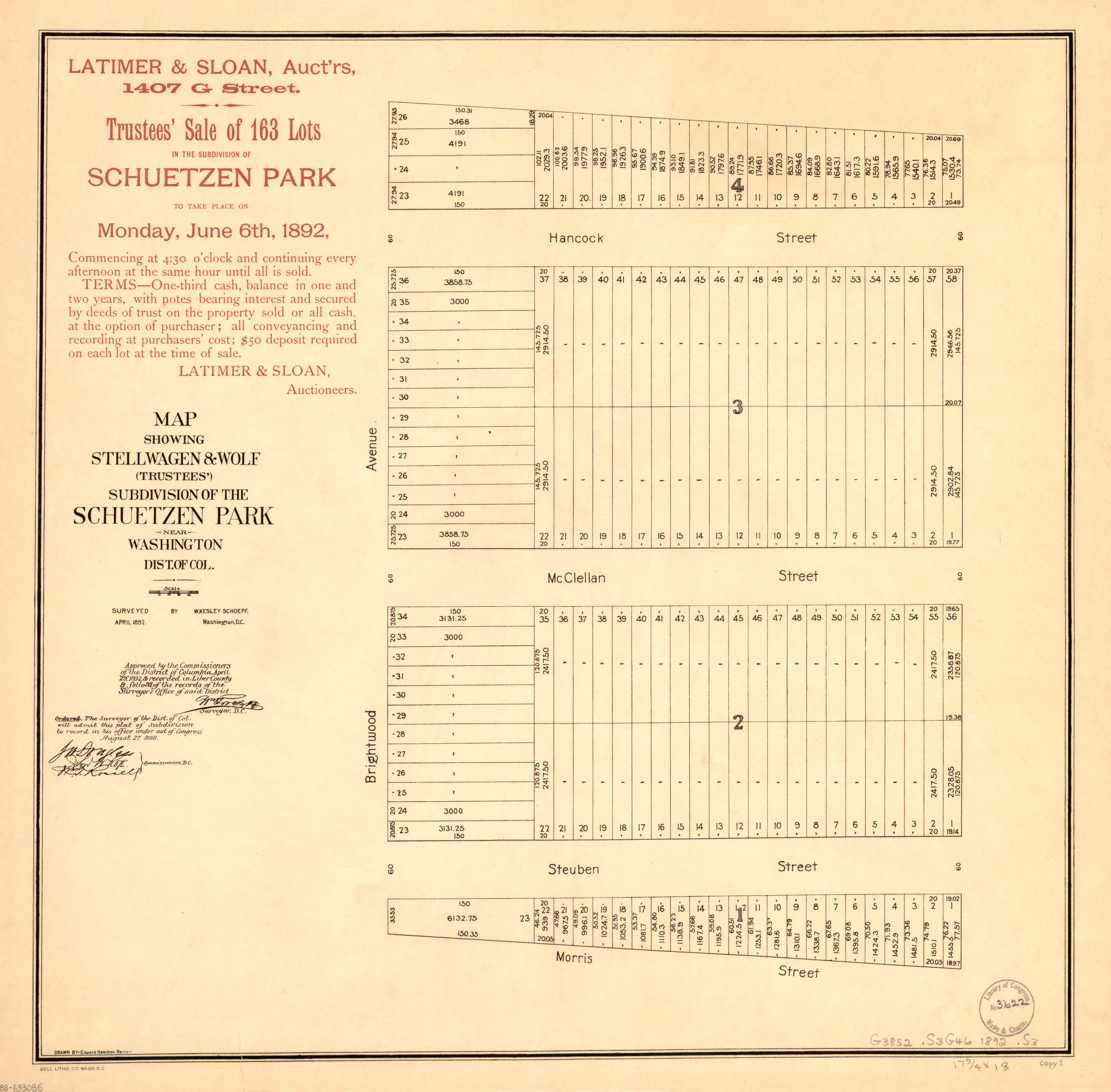
Map showing subdivision of the Schuetzen Park (LOC 88693086)

Schuetzen Park or Schützen Park (1866-1891) was a 19th-century recreation area in Washington, D.C. in the United States. The "picnic and pleasure ground" was founded by a German-American community group called Schuetzen Verein. The spacious, walled park was located on the east side of Georgia Avenue (then Seventh Street) between Hobart and Kenyon streets, Established in about 1866, on land where the 2nd Connecticut Regiment had camped during the American Civil War, Schuetzen Park survived until 1891, after which the area was developed into the neighborhood of Park View.

Attractions and ornaments of the park included a bust of Friedrich Wilhelm von Steuben, who had helped the colonists win the American Revolutionary War. The popular Schuetzen Fest was held at the park every summer and featured target-shooting events, drinking, and performances by such as a tightrope-walker and the Marine Band. The winner of the shooting contests was named the Schuetzen King for the year. Regular-season activities, in addition to target shooting, included dancing and bowling. A fire in 1879 destroyed much of the infrastructure and several old trees, but Schuetzen Verein rebuilt. The park closed for good in 1891 because the city banned the sale of alcohol within a mile of the nearby Soldiers' Home.

In nearby Baltimore, Maryland there were two more Schuetzen Park's. The one in Eastern Baltimore was also established in 1866, and the one at Mount Clare plantation in Southwest Baltimore was established in 1871.
