= Bauernschmidt brewing family =

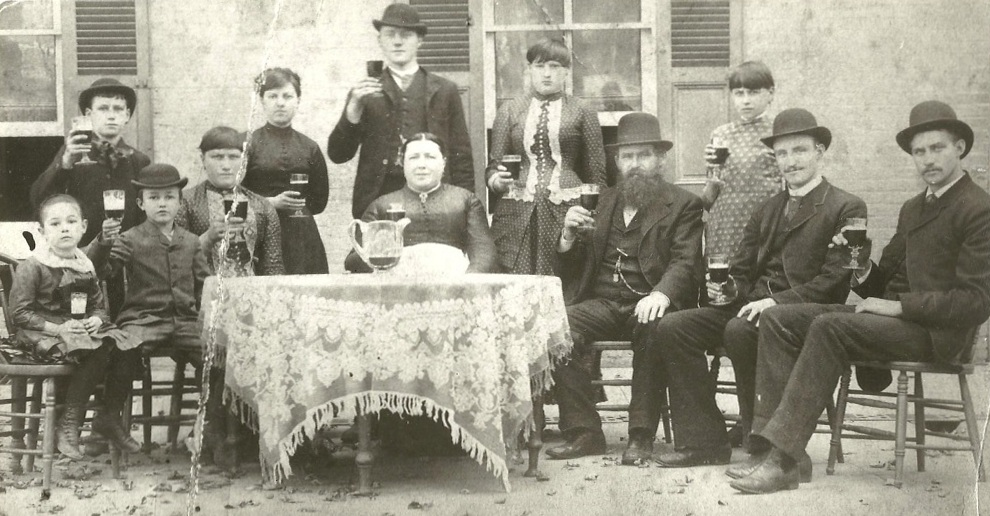
George Bauernschmidt's family (c. 1890-1892)

The Bauernschmidt family from Bavaria established a brewing dynasty in Baltimore, Maryland, during the later half of the nineteenth-century. Three brothers — George, John Jacob, and John Thomas — each founded successful breweries. One of the breweries, Greenwood Brewery, became the largest in Baltimore. The breweries on "Brewers Row" (Belair Ave now North Gay Street), were part of a thriving community of German immigrants, beer gardens, parks, and housing for workers.

Brewery names associated with the family included Greenwood Brewery, later called the George Bauernschmidt Brewing Company; Spring Garden Brewery; John Bauernschmidt's Lager Beer Brewery; Bauernschmidt & Marr; Mount Brewery; American Brewery.

== Origins and Immigration ==
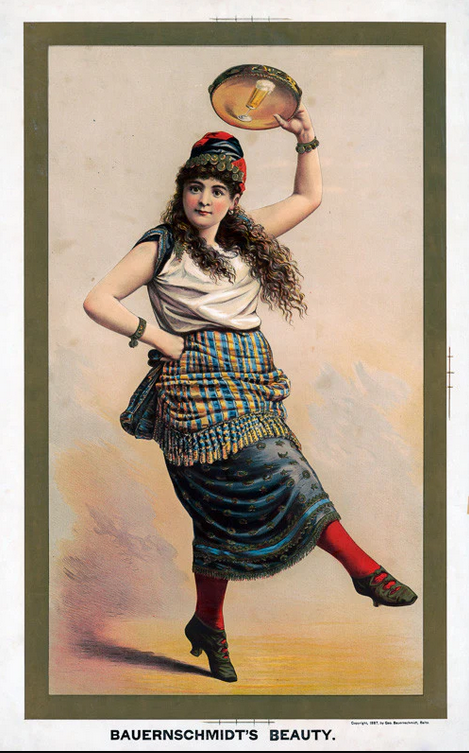
"Bauernschmidt's Beauty", a 1879 advertisement for Dancing Girl beer. Lighter and less filling that dark lager, it replaced some malt with rice. It was very successful, foreshadowing American-style beers after Prohibition eg. Budweiser.

The three Johann Bauernschmidt brothers — Johann Jacob ("John Jr." b. 1830), Johann Georg ("George" b. 1835), and Johann Thomas ("Little John" b. 1838) — were from Wannbach (or Wambach), Bavaria, near Nuremberg, where the family were employed as coopers and brewers. According to parish records, the father was Johann Bauernschmidt (b. 1804) who was a journeyman carpenter and brewer, and mother Barbara Hotzelein was a shoemaker's daughter. Seeking to escape Germany's rigid caste system, and avoid mandatory conscription into the Prussian military, the brothers all emigrated to America in search of better opportunities.

Lager, German for "to store," refers to beer fermented with bottom-fermenting yeast at near-freezing temperatures for a long period, a process that results in a cleaner, crisper taste than traditional warm top-fermented ales that are more prone to bad flavors. Lager after the 1860s was gaining in popularity, and Germans were developing processes for producing it at scale, originally done in mountain caves. John Jacob, the eldest, was the first to arrive in 1853. He initially settled in Cincinnati, Ohio where he gained experience at the Christian Moerlein Brewing Co. He relocated to Baltimore in 1856. George arrived in Baltimore in 1853 at the age of 18, first working as a farmhand before beginning an apprenticeship at the George Röst brewery, a pioneering lager brewer in the city. The youngest brother, John Thomas, came to Baltimore in 1864.

== George Baurenschmidt ==
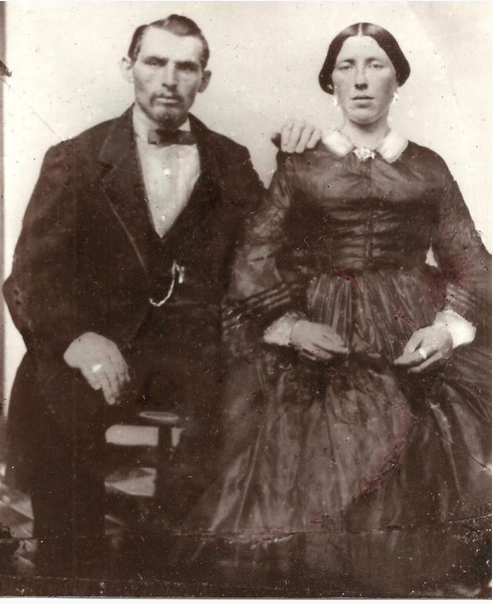
George and Margaretha marriage photo c. 1860, she was "a strong, shrewd, and determined woman" who pushed George to start his own brewery.

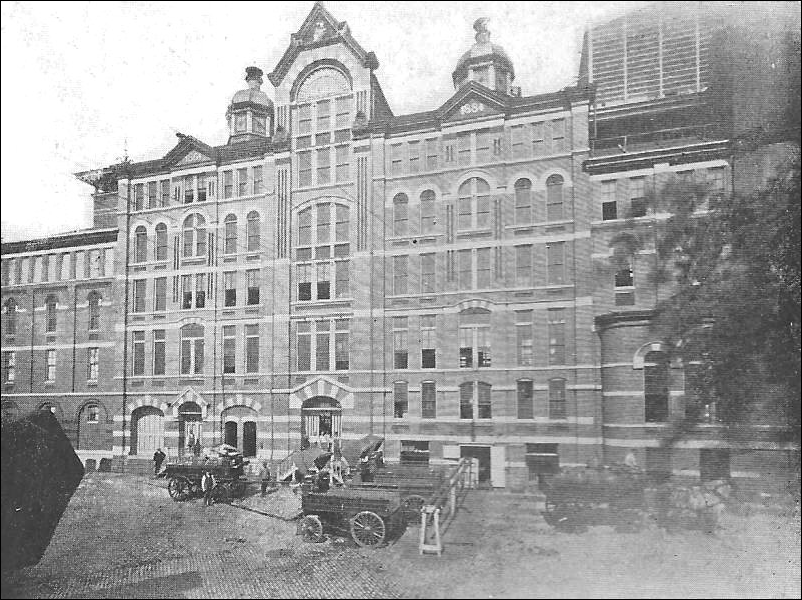
George Baurenschmidt's massive brewery building, completed in 1887, was comparable only with his brother-in-law's "Teutonic Brewery" a block away (photo 1900).

George Baurenschmidt was born May 28, 1835. After arriving in Baltimore in 1853 as a teenager, he initially worked on a local farm which he later described as the happiest time of his life. He then began learning the brewing trade under George Röst, the "godfather" of lager in Baltimore who proved it was possible to lager beer in brick catacombs underneath the streets. George entered into a partnership with his brother John Jacob in 1860, operating a small brewery on West Pratt Street. That same year, he married Margaretha Wiessner, the sister of another prominent German brewer, John Frederick Wiessner who George knew from Bavaria. Margaretha was described as a strong, shrewd, and determined woman. This family connection became central in the city's "Brewers Row", where the two brothers-in-law operated major breweries just a block apart, engaging in friendly competition, and raised large families with interrelationships. George was involved in the local German community, using his farm for meetings of the German Society of Baltimore, the Riding Club, and the Maennerchor (men's choir).

In 1864, at the age of 29, George left his older brother John Jacob and started his own brewery, leasing twelve acres from Charles Rogers, who owned the tract known as Greenwood Estate, located off Belair Avenue near the north-eastern edge of the city. At the time it was still mostly small farms and undeveloped except along the road. He called it the Greenwood Brewery. The initial operation was small, producing 5,000 barrels per year from a two-story brew house that also had a picnic park called Greenwood Park. He built a residence on the property that housed not only his own family but also his brewery employees, a common practice among German brewers. By 1876, he added a tavern and hotel.

The production of lager required cold temperatures, which before mechanical refrigeration was accomplished in deep cellars using huge quantities of natural ice, often harvested and continually shipped from as far away as Maine during the warmer months. In 1887, George rebuilt and expanded his brewery into a massive five-story facility and became only the second brewer in Baltimore to install a modern mechanical refrigeration system, invented by Carl von Linde. These machines eliminated the reliance on ice, allowed for year-round production, and increased capacity. He soon outgrew his first 50-ton compressor and added another with a 100-ton capacity. This technological leap also enabled a more efficient, gravity-fed brewing process, as cooling rooms could be located on upper floors, freeing ground-level space for packing and shipping.

George was the first brewer in Baltimore to create an in-house bottling plant, around 1895, previously brewers outsourced it to other companies. This gave him greater control over the final product. He also experimented with new beer styles, sending his son John to Chicago to learn how to make pale lager that was gaining in popularity. George's production increased to 50,000 barrels in 1887, and exceeded 60,000 barrels by 1895, making it the largest brewery in Baltimore. All three of his sons — John, William, and Frederick — were employed in the business, and the brewery became one of the first "stock breweries" in the city i.e. they issued shares to investors.

In 1899, George made a fateful decision that fractured his family. He agreed to sell the family brewery to the Maryland Brewing Company, a newly formed "trust" (conglomerate) that was consolidating seventeen local breweries in an attempt to control the market. His sons Frederick Bauernschmidt and William were opposed to the sale, wanting to keep the business independent. Frederick, a trained lawyer who had been serving as the brewery's treasurer, resigned. He and William used their share of the proceeds from the sale to found the independent American Brewery in 1900, going into direct competition with the trust. George Baurenschmidt died on April 12, 1899, shortly after the sale was finalized, the rift with his sons never repaired.

== John Jacob Baurenschmidt ==
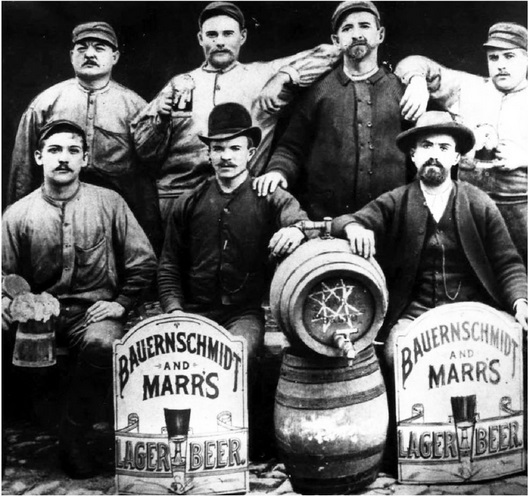
Bauernschmidt & Marr's Lager Beer, c. 1879-1889

John Jacob "John Jr." Bauernschmidt was born June 10, 1830. He came to Baltimore in 1856 after gaining experience in Cincinnati. Following a brief partnership with his brother George, he established his own brewery at Ridgely Street in 1866 (the current 1500 block between Worcester and Bayard streets). Initially known as John Bauernschmidt's Lager Beer Brewery, it expanded and was renamed the Spring Garden Brewery. It was a small scale traditional operation, John Jacob was known for quality, reportedly dumping any batch of beer that did not meet his standards.

The brewery expanded to 22,000 square feet and had a saloon, an inn, and a popular beer garden known as Bauernschmidt's Park by 1876. Like his brother, John Jacob provided on-site housing for his workers in a large, three-and-a-half-story residence he built in the early 1870s adjacent to the brewery. By 1879, the Spring Garden Brewery was producing nearly 12,000 barrels of beer annually. John Jacob died suddenly of a stroke on June 28, 1879, at the age of forty-nine.

Following his death, his widow, Elizabeth Marr Bauernschmidt, continued the business, bringing in her brother, John Marr, to manage operations. The brewery was renamed the Bauernschmidt and Marr Brewing Company. In 1889, Marr sold the brewery to Baltimore United Breweries, a British-owned syndicate. A decade later, in 1899, the brewery was sold again, this time to the Maryland Brewing Company trust, the same conglomerate that purchased his brother George's brewery.

== John Thomas Baurenschmidt ==
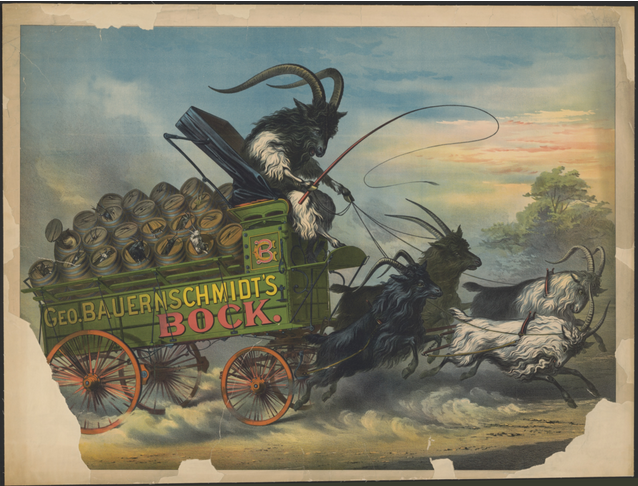
George Bauernschmidt's Bock Beer was a seasonal festive beer with flavorings and high alcohol, "so potent and exhilarating that the drinker soon becomes as frisky in his gambols as the goat" (1870, lithograph advertisement).

John Thomas "Little John" Bauernschmidt was born March 18, 1838. He was the youngest brother. After arriving in Baltimore in 1864, he first worked as the brewmaster for his older brother George at the Greenwood Brewery. Eventually he established his own operation in 1873, the Mount Brewery, on Pratt Street at the corner of Mount Street.

His brewery began as a tiny "one-wheelbarrow" operation, capable of producing only half a keg per day. However, the quality of his beer was well-regarded, allowing him to expand in 1875. By 1889, the Mount Brewery was producing 20,000 barrels per year and, like his brothers' breweries, featured a beer garden for local families. That same year, he sold his brewery to the Baltimore United Breweries syndicate to help cover a mortgage to his maltster. When the new owners struggled with operations, John Thomas was asked to return as a general manager. He was an active member of the community, involved in philanthropic work through organizations like the Freemasons and the Odd Fellows to aid German immigrants. John Thomas Bauernschmidt died on March 3, 1897, at the age of fifty-nine. Two years later, his former brewery was sold then discontinued, no longer considered up to date.

== Frederick Bauernschmidt ==
Frederick Bauernschmidt (1864-1833) was the son of George and Margaretha. After the split with his father in 1899 over the Maryland Brewing Company sale, he founded his own brewery called the American Brewery. It was extremely successful, becoming one of the largest in Maryland, before shutting down with Prohibition around 1920.

== Marie Bauernschmidt ==
William Bauernschmidt (1874-1934) was the son of George and Margaretha. He married Marie Oehl von Hattersheim (1875-1962). She became Marie Bauernschmidt, aka "Mrs B.", who was an outspoken political and moral reformer in Baltimore. She took an active role in local and state elections through radio speeches during primary and general elections from 1927 to 1950. Her wit and quotability made her a frequently subject in newspapers. A biography by Cynthia Requardt is titled Mrs. B. Speaks Her Mind: Marie Bauernschmidt, Baltimore's Political Gadfly (2015).
