= Pabst Brewing Company Former Corporate Office Building =

Coordinates: 43.0455°N 87.9235°W

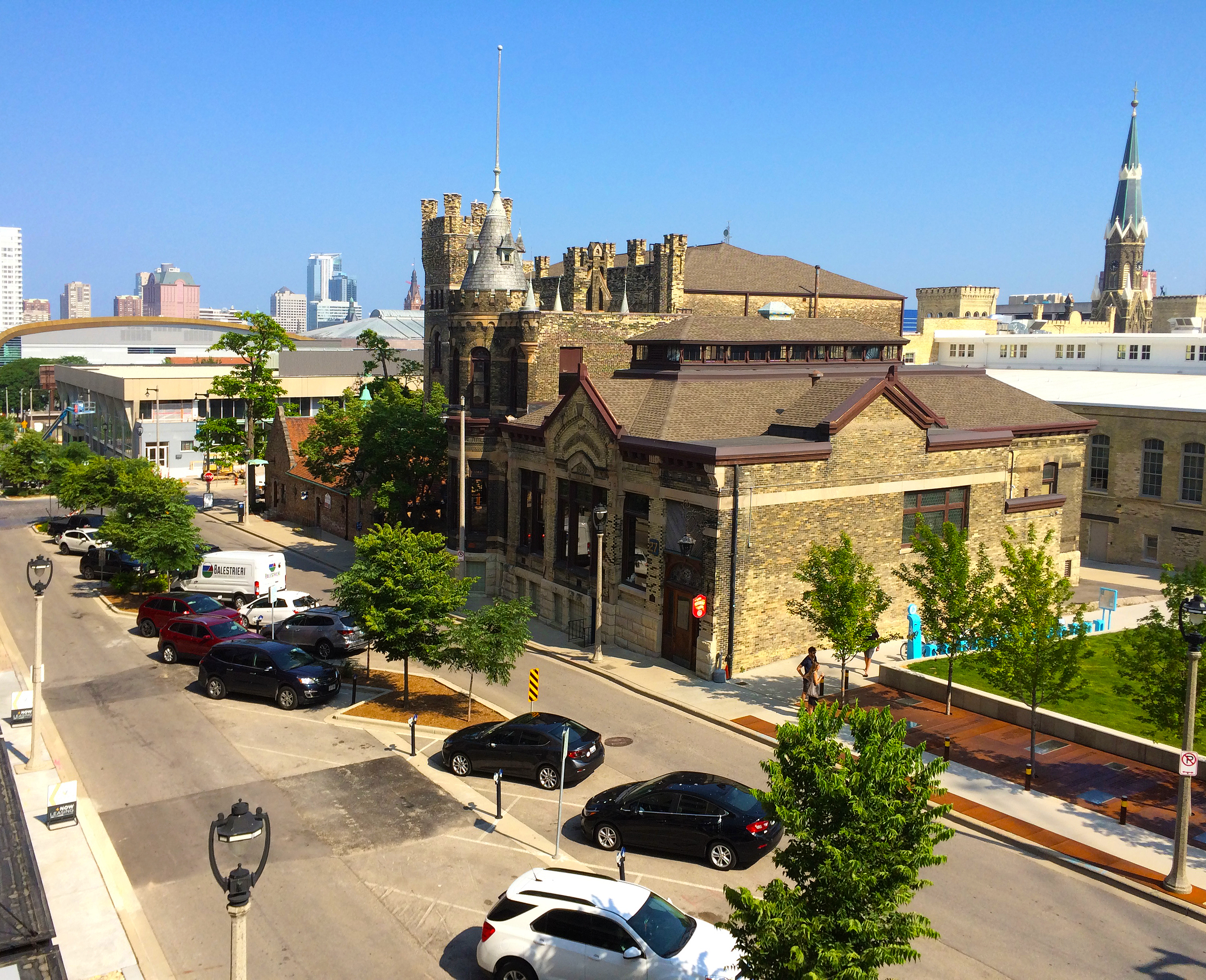
The former Pabst Brewing Co. corporate offices & visitors center, now known as Best Place at the Historic Pabst Brewery.

The Pabst Brewing Company former Corporate Office Building & Guest Center is located at 901 W. Juneau Ave. in downtown Milwaukee, Wisconsin in the Pabst Brewery Complex.

== Early history ==
It was originally a public elementary school built in 1858 across the street from the Best Brewing Company. The Best Brewing Company was purchased by Captain Frederick Pabst and renamed the Pabst Brewing Company. The school and grounds were purchased by Captain Frederick Pabst in 1890 for the playground. Captain Frederick Pabst wanted to build a bottling house on the playground area, and decided to use the school for the corporate offices. He had alterations made to the building, including improving the school’s original tower and turning the cornice on the roof into battlements. The Visitor’s Center and Gift Shop were added to the structure in 1934 after Prohibition ended. For the Pabst Brewing Company’s centennial celebration in 1944, Blue Ribbon Hall was painted by muralist Edger Miller in 1943 after the first floor was transformed into a 17th-century Guild Hall.

== Recent history ==
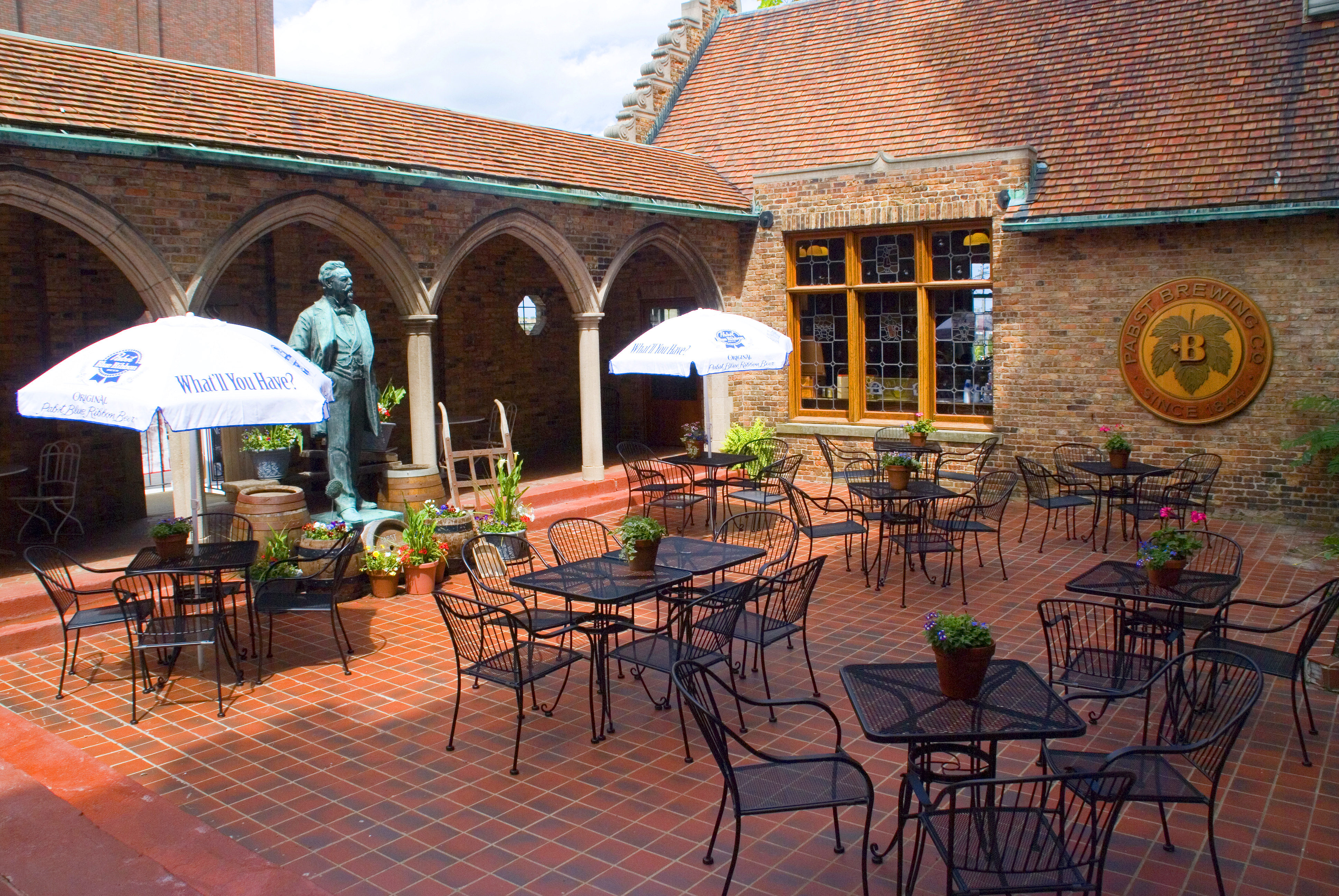
A view of the Captain's Courtyard (ca. 2019) featuring a statue of Frederick Pabst

In 1996 the Pabst Brewing Company shut down its Milwaukee brewery. The building remained vacant until the Brew City Redevelopment Group along with Jim Haertel purchased the property and opened a tavern and gift shop in 2009. It is part of a larger redevelopment of the Pabst Brewery Complex. The Pabst Brewery Complex was listed on the National Register of Historic Places. Known as Best Place at the Historic Pabst Brewery, the building now consists of the Guest Center/Tap Room, Blue Ribbon Hall, The Great Hall, a Gift Shop, the King's Courtyard & the Captain's Courtyard with a life-sized statue of Captain Frederick Pabst (ca. 1903) created by famous Italian artist and sculpture Gaetano Trentanove. The King's Courtyard was home to a statue of King Gambrinus, but the statue was taken by the Pabst Brewing Company when the company shut down the brewery. The statue was returned to the property on May 21, 2011. It is now on permanent loan from the Pabst Brewing Company.
