= Pabst Brewery Complex =

Coordinates: 43°2′45″N 87°55′30″W

- Pabst Brewing Company Complex
- U.S. National Register of Historic Places
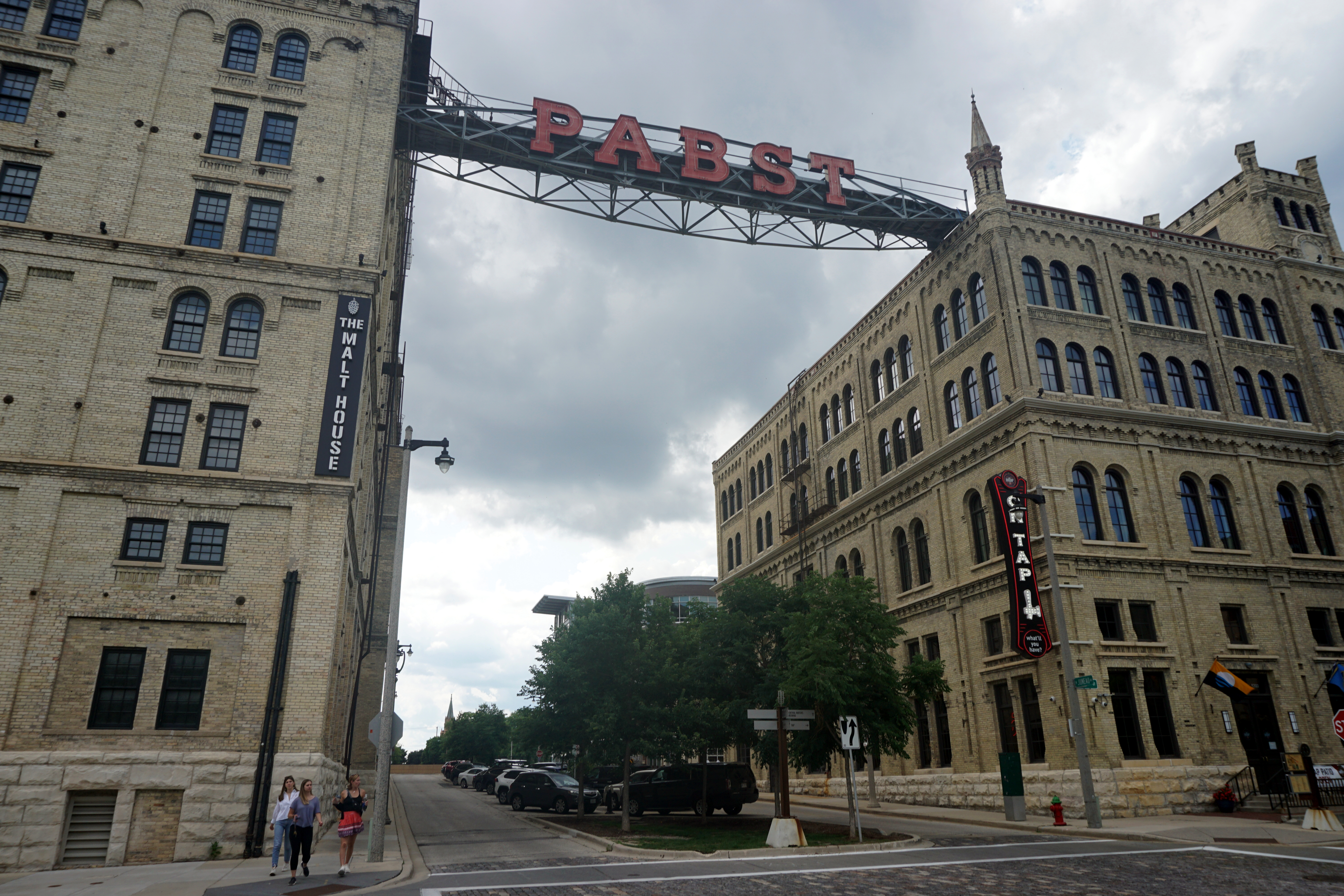
- The brew house and malt house of the former Pabst Brewery
- Location: Milwaukee, Wisconsin, US
- Architect: Charles Hoffmann; Otto Strack
- Architectural style: Late Victorian, Modern Movement
- NRHP reference No.: 03001165
- Added to NRHP: November 14, 2003

The Pabst Brewery Complex northwest of downtown Milwaukee, Wisconsin, was the former brewery of the Pabst Brewing Company until 1997. The complex was listed on the National Register of Historic Places in 2003.

== History ==
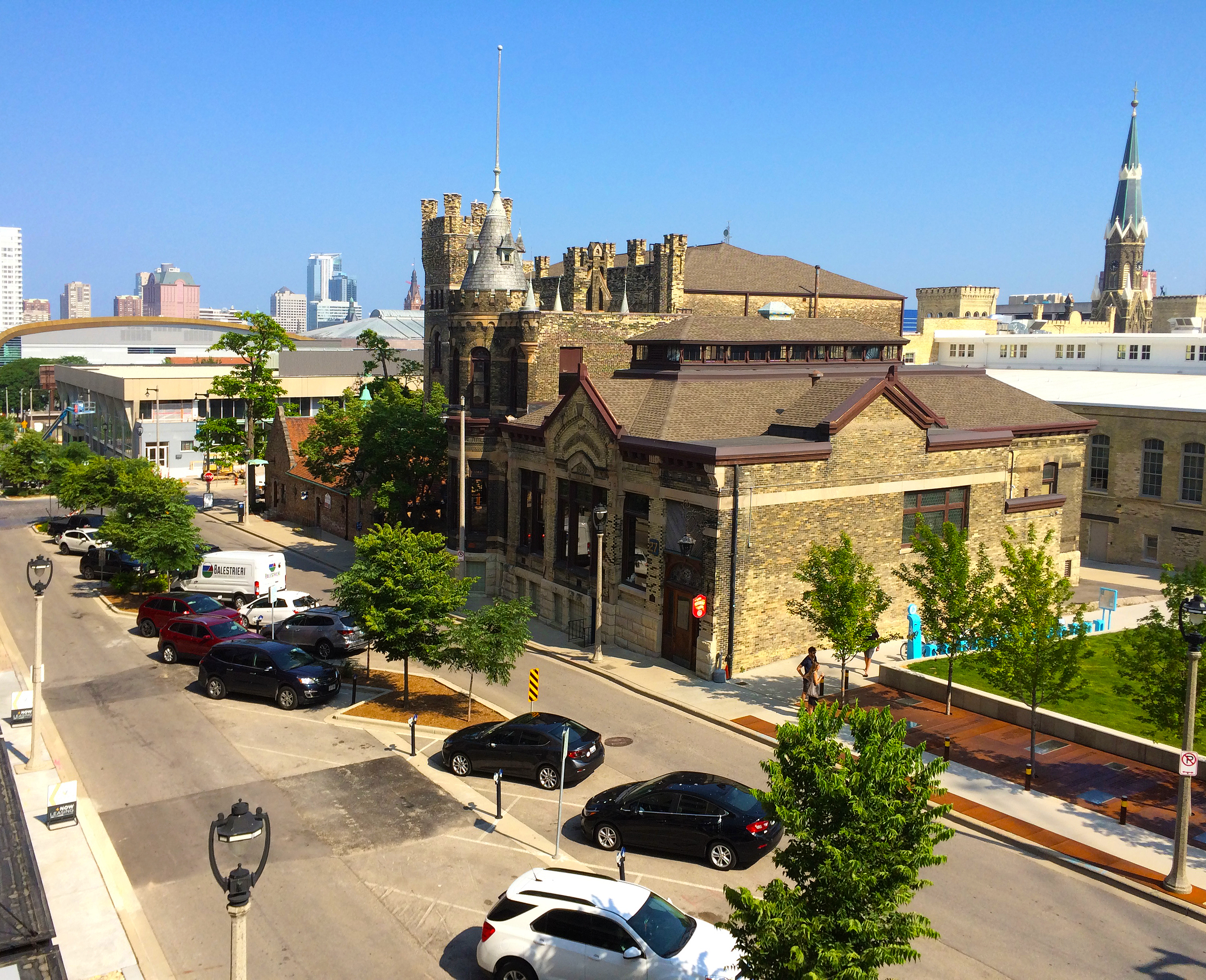
The former Pabst Brewing Company Former Corporate Office Building, now known as Best Place

In 1844 Jacob Best Sr., an immigrant from Mettenheim, Germany, founded the Best and Company Brewery with his four sons - the germ of the Pabst complex. Along with lager beer, Best brewed ale, porter and whiskey. When old Jacob retired in 1853, his brewery produced 2,500 barrels per year - the fourth largest brewery in Milwaukee.

Frederick Pabst immigrated with his family from Thuringia, Germany in 1848. Young Frederick went to work on steamships, working his way up from cabin boy to captain. In 1862 he married Maria Best, granddaughter of Jacob Best and daughter of Phillip, who co-owned the old Best brewery. Two years later he joined the Best brewery, and in 1866 he and Emil Schandlein, another son-in-law, bought the business. This was right when beer consumption was growing. The brewery produced 5,000 barrels in 1864, 37,000 in 1870, and 114,000 in 1874. In 1868 Best was the largest brewery in Milwaukee.

In 1889 the Best Company was renamed the Pabst Brewing Company. Production continued to grow and in 1892 Pabst was the largest brewer of lager in the world, with its sales increased 1,000% since 1872. That record was exchanged between Pabst, Anheuser-Busch, and Schlitz in following years.

Pabst's brewery began innovating in the 1880s. It began using pure yeast culture to ferment the beer. Their engineers developed devices for washing barley, extracting hops, soaking bottles, making barrel staves, and rinsing kegs. Superintendent J. Fred Theurer and chemist Dr. Paul Fischer developed a way to reintroduce carbon dioxide into beer, which produced clearer beer than the old kraeusening process. Around 1890 Pabst helped get laws changed which had required barreling the beer solely to tax it, and then his engineers developed a way to pipe beer directly from vats into bottles.

The facility was closed in 1997. On August 16, 2006, the brewery complex was purchased by Joseph Zilber's investment group Brewery Project LLC for $13 million to create The Brewery, a renovated complex for residential, office, and retail use. The Pabst Brewing Company Former Corporate Office Building & Visitor Center have been reopened as "Best Place," in reference to the brewery's founders Jacob Best and Phillip Best, and feature an antiques gift shop, Blue Ribbon Hall and the "Little Tavern on the Hill." Enclosed by the building are two courtyards, one of which houses a statue of Captain Frederick Pabst. A statue of King Gambrinus, the unofficial patron saint of beer, used to be displayed in the other courtyard, but was removed when the brewery was shut down in the mid-1990s. The sculpture was loaned back to the complex by the Pabst Corporation after a lengthy negotiation period on May 21, 2011.

The former Pabst Brewhouse was also transformed into a hotel by Gorman & Company, a firm based in Oregon, Wisconsin. The hotel opened for business in April 2013. The project included partial restoration of six original brew kettles viewable in the hotel's atrium, fixtures made from repurposed wood beams, and a green roof. Jackson's Blue Ribbon Pub & Grill is attached to the hotel.

Renovated portions of the complex also house facilities for local universities, including the University of Wisconsin–Milwaukee Zilber School of Public Health. The bottling plant was also turned into off-campus, private student housing for local colleges, which opened in August 2016.

== Buildings ==
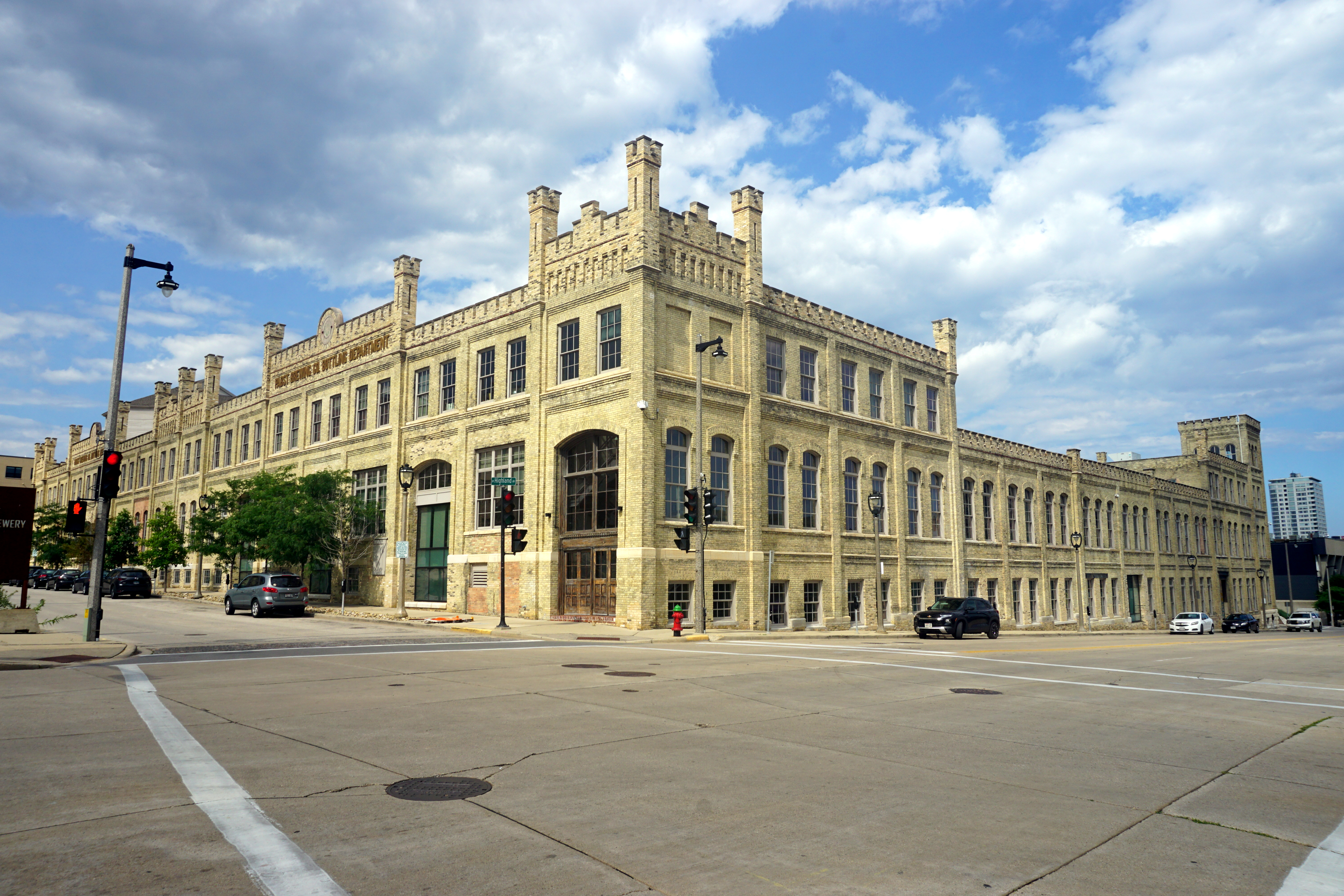
Pabst Brewing Company Bottling Department

The current complex contains about 30 buildings, with some examples listed here:

- The 1858 Jefferson Public School was built in 1858 and later bought by Pabst in 1886 to house offices and a sign painters' studio. Pabst restyled the building with the square tower, battlements, and stepped parapet.
- The earliest surviving construction under Pabst's tenure is the stock house/fermenting house, a 5 or 6 story Italianate-styled building built in 1875 (or 1870?) in which beer was fermented and stored.
- The main office building was built in 1880, a whimsical German-styled building with battlements at the top. Otto Strack designed its round corner tower, which was added in 1892, suggesting a whimsical German castle with battlements.
- The brew house is a 5-story Italianate-styled building built around 1882 and expanded around 1892. Malt was ground in this building, and mashing and boiling occurred here.
- The malt house is another massive 6 or 7-story building built around 1882 and repaired in 1901 after a fire. It contained barley-steeping tanks, malting chambers, and malt kilns.
- The bottling house is a 2.5-story building clad in cream brick, with crenelated towers, again in a German Renaissance Revival style. The northern nine bays were built in 1889, more were built in 1910, and it was completed by 1911. Bottle-washing, filing, corking, pasteurization, and labeling all occurred in this building.
- The Malt Elevator is a tall cream brick building designed by Charles Hoffman, built in 1891, and built two stories higher after a fire in 1901.
- The Visitors Center/Reception Building is a brick-clad one-story building with Flemish-style stepped parapets fronting the gables, designed by Thomas Van Alyea and built in 1933. Inside visitors could sample beer after their tours, while contemplating German beer-related frescoes painted on the walls.

== See also ==
- List of defunct breweries in the United States
