= Charles Stoll & Son =

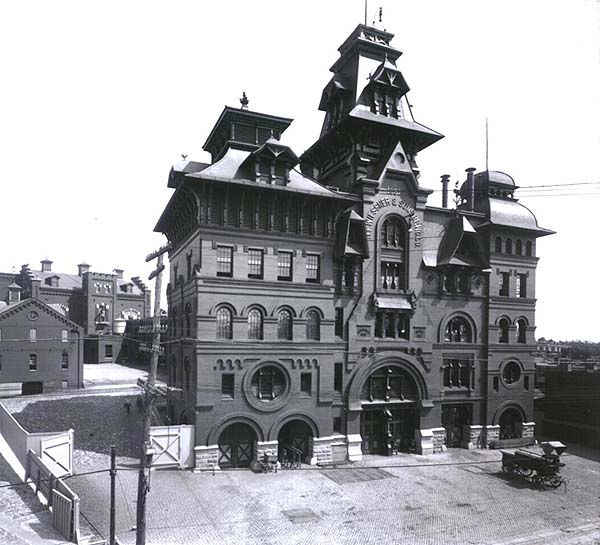
Wiessner-American Brewery (1887)

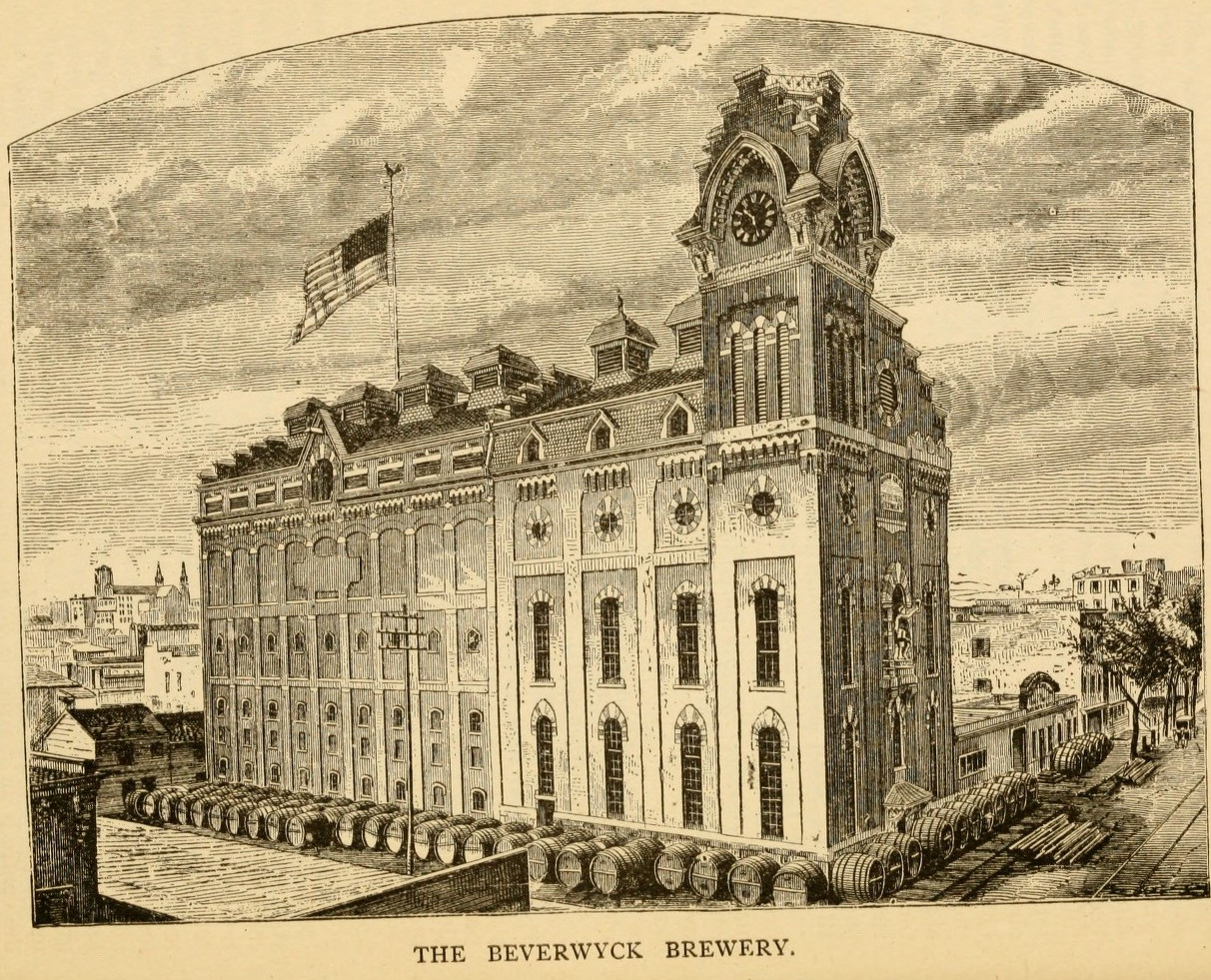
Beverwyck Brewery (1878)

Charles Stoll & Son was a 19th century American architect firm from Brooklyn, New York. It was founded by Charles Stoll (1835-1893) who was an immigrant from the Prussian Kingdom at the age of 12 and trained as a millwright and machinist. He became a specialist in designing brew houses. As noted by an industry observer in 1911, "Men like Charles Stoll and Anthony Pfund of New York, Fred W. Wolf of Chicago, and Edmund Jungenfeld of St. Louis are beyond question the pioneer architects and engineers of breweries in this country". Stoll frequently appeared in New York City newspaper records for building permits related to small breweries and ice houses, projects that allowed him to develop his trade.

Stoll reached national prominence at the 1876 Centennial Exhibition in Philadelphia, where he designed and displayed the "Centennial Brewery" at Brewers Hall. It was a "model brewery" demonstrating a modern mass-production brewery system seen by many attendees for the first time. The exhibit could produce 150 barrels of beer in each brewing, used an icehouse for beer storage, and was the most popular part of the brewers exhibit.

Stoll's major designs include the Wiessner-American Brewery building in Baltimore, Maryland; the Hinchliffe Brewing building in Paterson, New Jersey; and the pioneering Beverwyck Brewery building in Albany, New York. Stoll made popular the "Teutonic-style" brewery, exemplified by the extant Baltimore building.

The breweries by necessity were tall so that gravity could feed the various stages of the beer making process, ending in underground cold storage or "laggering" vaults. The tallest tower held grain. Stoll had patents on ice-making machines that were a big improvement from natural ice. There were facilities for a large number of horses and carriages needed to make beer deliveries around the city, later replaced by gasoline powered trucks. There were bottling plants either detached or in the main brewery building. There may have been detached quarters for employees and owners to live. All of these features are still extant at the Baltimore location.
