= Wiessner-American Brewery building =

Historic building in Baltimore, Maryland

- Wiessner-American Brewery
- U.S. National Register of Historic Places
- Baltimore City Landmark
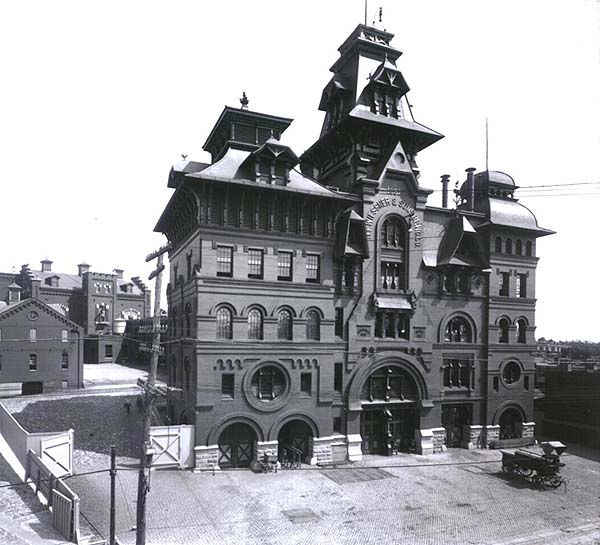
- Interactive map of Wiessner-American Brewery
- Location: 1701 North Gay Street, Baltimore, Maryland
- Coordinates: 39°18′34″N 76°35′14″W
- Area: 2.8 acres (1.1 ha)
- Built: 1887
- Architect: Charles Stoll & Son
- Architectural style: Middle-European Chalet; Teutonic Brewery; Bavarian Pagoda
- NRHP reference No.: 73002179

Significant dates
- Added to NRHP: May 9, 1973
- Designated BCL: 2008

The Wiessner-American Brewery building in Baltimore, Maryland was built in 1887 by J. F. Wiessner & Sons. The Wiessner beer was in such high demand, known for quality, the brewery became one of the largest in Maryland. It closed in 1920 with prohibition. After repeal in 1933, it was used by American Brewery for the next four decades, after which it closed for good and left abandoned for another 35 years. Finally a rehabilitation was completed in 2009, costing over 20 million dollars. Today it is the headquarters of Humanim, a non-profit social services organization.

The building was added in 1973 to the National Register of Historic Places.

== History ==
The brewery building was built in 1887, by J. F. Wiessner & Sons, a local German brewery in business since 1863. It was designed by the pioneering brewing architect, Charles Stoll. It is an ornate example of "Teutonic Brewery" architecture that Stoll made popular. The six-acre site included a cooperage shop, a bottling house, stables, and underground brick tunnels, resembling catacombs, that could store tens of thousands of barrels of beer. It was one of the largest producing breweries in Maryland. The historic district south of Clifton Park along Gay Street was the location of six breweries, known as "Brewers Row". Wiessner's today the only surviving brewery building in the district.

Weissner's was one block from Schuetzen Park, a gathering place for the neighborhood ethnic German community. The Wiessner's were a central part of the German community. Prohibition forced the brewery to shutdown in 1920, and facing family deaths, in 1931 the Wiessner family sold the brewery to the American Malt Company, that made malt for other purposes mainly home brewing. When prohibition ended in 1933, the building reopened under new owners, called the American Brewery, that made a series of branded local beers over the next 40 years. They modernized the interior equipment and operated the brewery until 1973. The building was added that year to the National Register of Historic Places. After 1973, the building was effectively abandoned: it had smashed windows, pigeon guano piles, the neighbors considered it haunted, there were even local rumors of giant bats in the tower. According to a city map, the brewery was next to an old "burying ground".

== Architecture ==
The Wiessner building has a seven-story central tower flanked by two, six-story towers. The central tower housed a 10,000-bushel grain elevator. The brew house operations were organized with gravity in mind. The process began on the fifth floor and ended in the underground cold storage ("lagering") vaults. The brew house building has been described as one of the finest American examples of the "Teutonic Brewery" style, referred to locally as "Germanic Pagoda" or "Bavarian Pagoda".

In addition to the brewery complex, immediately across Gay St. is a complex of buildings consisting of the former wagon house, stables, temporary workers residence, company offices, and the Wiessner home built in 1896. These buildings have been completely renovated and expanded, and now serve as a senior citizen home.

There is a large bottling plant owned by Humanim that has yet to be repurposed.

== Redevelopment ==
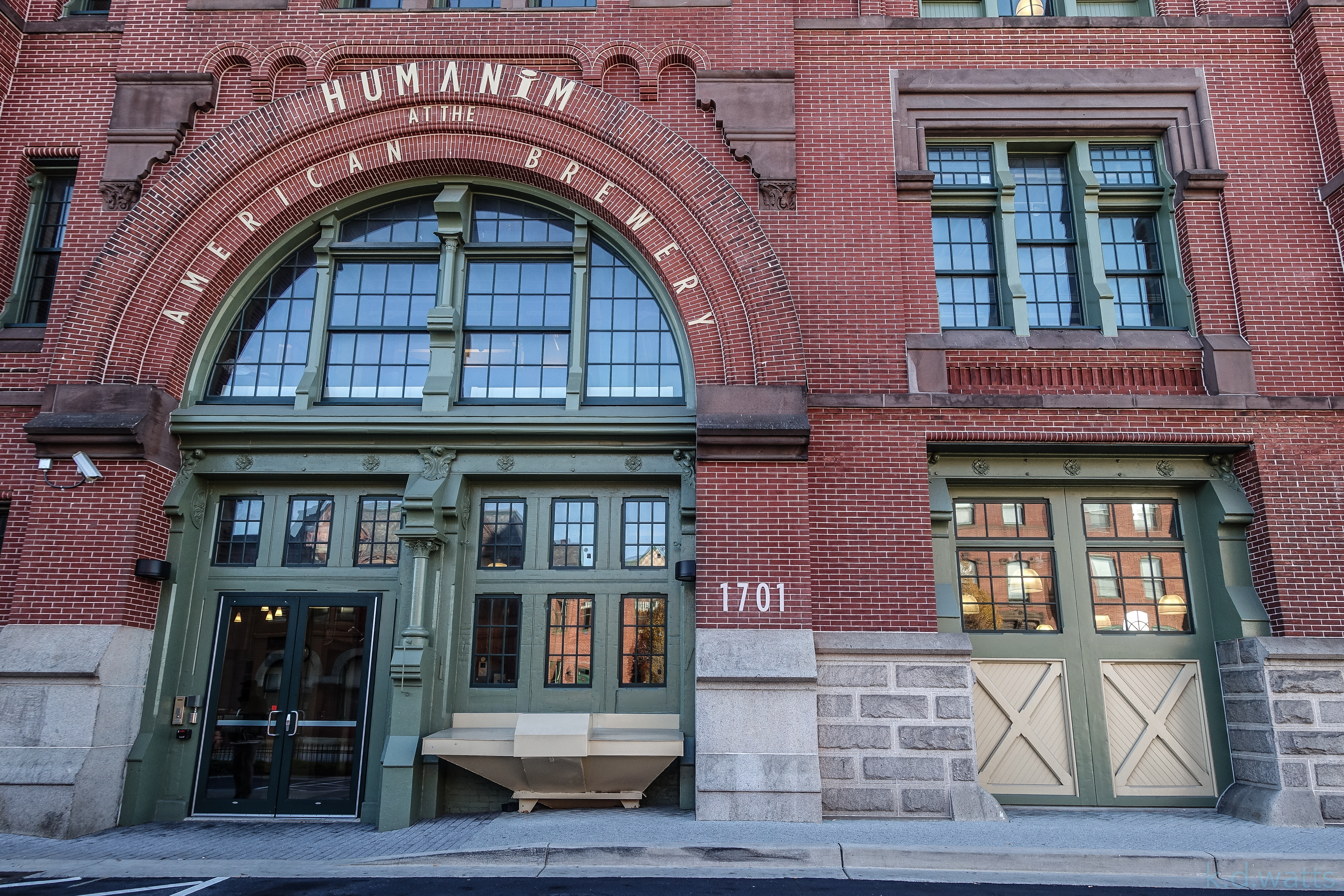
Entrance post-renovation

The once-thriving neighborhood around the brewery building has long been in decline and was largely neglected during the latter half of the 20th century. About half of the homes and other buildings in the area have been demolished or are vacant. Basic services such as grocery stores and restaurants have disappeared. In 2006, the City of Baltimore moved to acquire 200 abandoned properties in the area for demolition or rehabilitation.

Humanim is a non-profit formerly based in Columbia, Maryland. They provide job training, outpatient mental-health and developmental-disabilities counseling, services for the deaf, and other functions for the poor and disadvantaged. In 2007, they were looking for a place to relocate closer to their clientele and literally broke into the abandoned brewery to look at its potential as a headquarters. They approached the city who offered to sell it to them for $2,500, with the understanding the non-profit would rehabilitate the building. The real cost then was over $22 million. However, a $14 million dollar property tax credit from the city reduced the burden, plus they raised $7 million from philanthropic sources that included the Annie E. Casey Foundation, France-Merrick Foundation, Kresge Foundation, and the Harry and Jeanette Weinberg Foundation.

Baltimore architecture firm Cho Benn Holback Associates did the redesign. This included a dismembered metal beer tank as a cubicle, and grain hoppers and conveyor systems retained as interior features. The project won more than a dozen awards from preservationist and architectural groups, including the Maryland chapter of the American Institute of Architects, which named it "public building of the year" in 2009.

The contractor and lead developer was Struever Bros Eccles & Rouse (SBER), known for many high-profile historic renovations in Baltimore.

== Building name ==
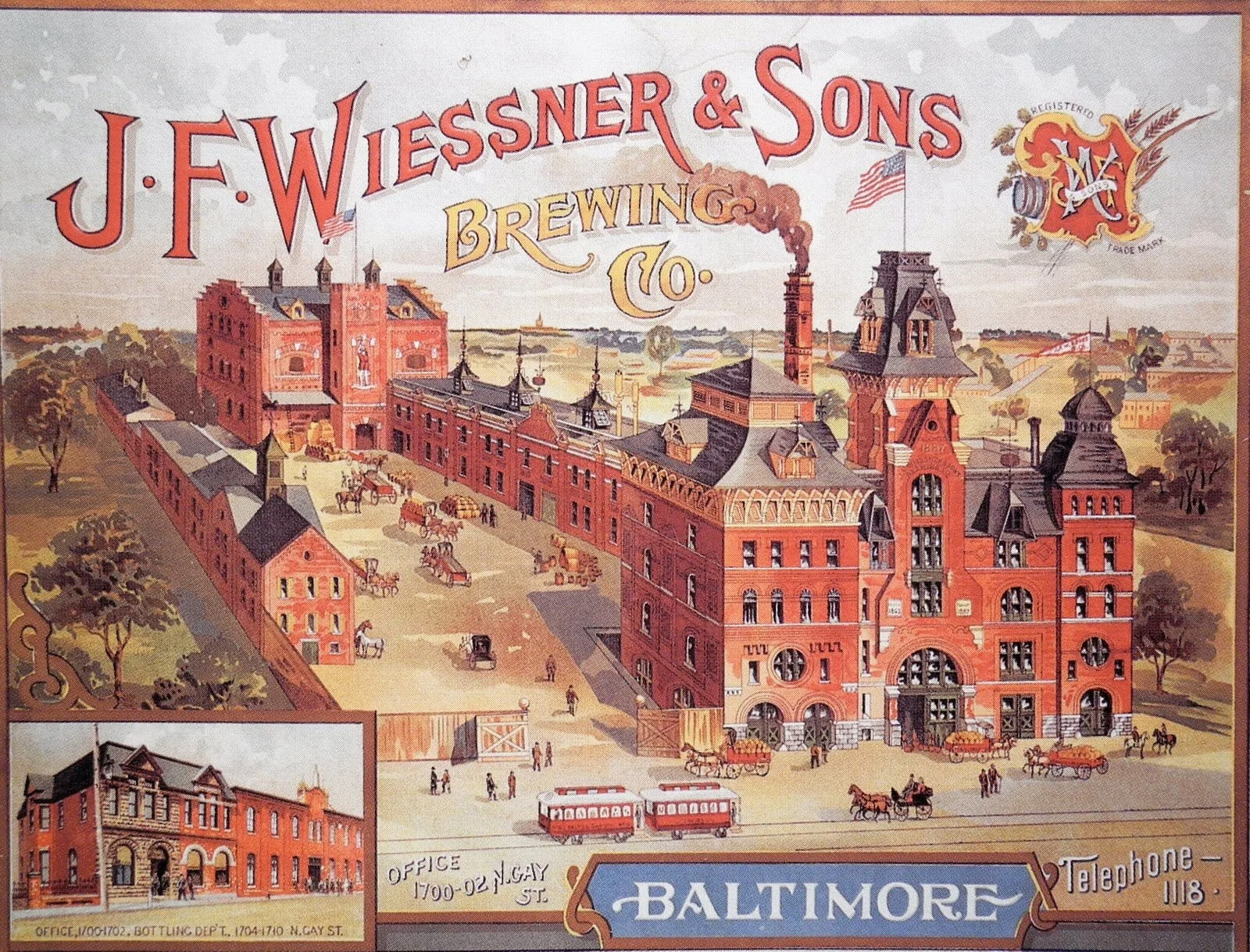
Poster art ca. 1890

The building had different owners over the years serving different purposes, accumulating names official and unofficial.

- 1887-1931: Variously the John. F. Wiessner, John. F. Wiessner & Sons, Wiessner brewery, Maryland Brewing Company
- 1931-1933: American Malt Company
- 1933-1973: American Brewery, Fort Pitt, Imperial Brewing Company, Cumberland Brewing Company
- 1973-2009: American Brewery (by convention)
- 2009-present: American Brewery, Humanim, Harry and Jeanette Weinberg Building

During redevelopment, the Harry and Jeanette Weinberg Foundation gave the single largest grant of $2.75-million. The gift included a requirement the foundation could rename the building. They chose the "Harry and Jeanette Weinberg Building", even though 65 other buildings in Baltimore already had the same name. The foundation has a stipulation, per the will of the founder, that buildings it funds have the same name. The Weinberg Foundation board of directors were not too focused on the building's history or architecture, rather "We [the foundation board] thought that Humanim's leaving the comfortable confines of Columbia and consolidating operations within an economically devastated area was a good thing. You like to locate services where the poor people are." The primary mission of the Weinberg Foundation is to help poor people.

The listing for the National Register of Historic Places (2002) cites two names: American Brewery and Wiessner Brewery.

== See also ==
- Bauernschmidt brewing family
- Schuetzen Park
