= Schuetzen Park (Baltimore) =

Private park in Baltimore, Maryland, United States

Coordinates: 39°18′36″N 76°35′04″W

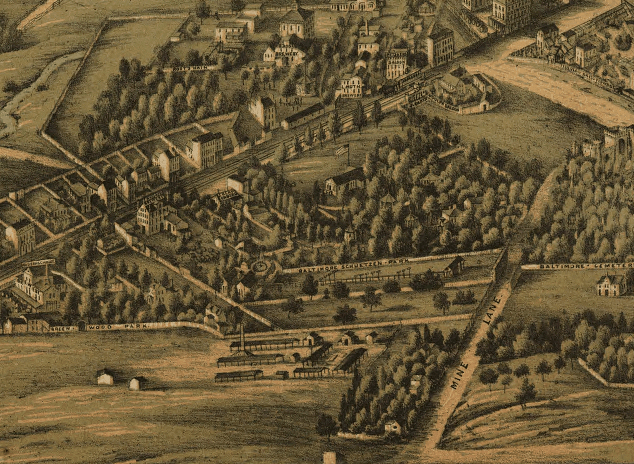
Schuetzen Park is the building in the middle with a flag. Date unknown but likely around 1867 as it matches closely a painting dated 1867 (below).

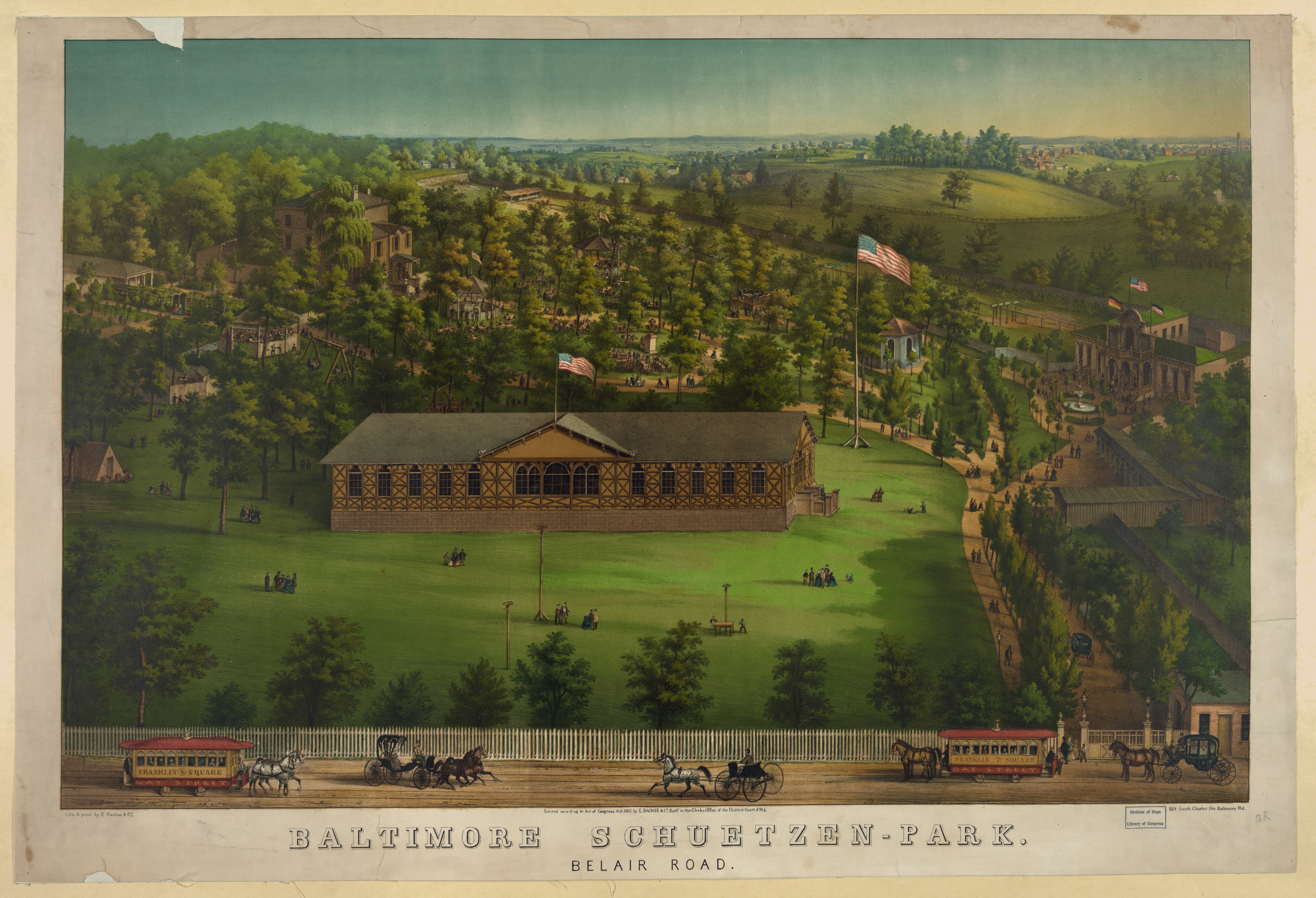
The former Schuetzen Park in East Baltimore on Belair Road (1867) was a favorite place for picnics, sports and annual celebrations.

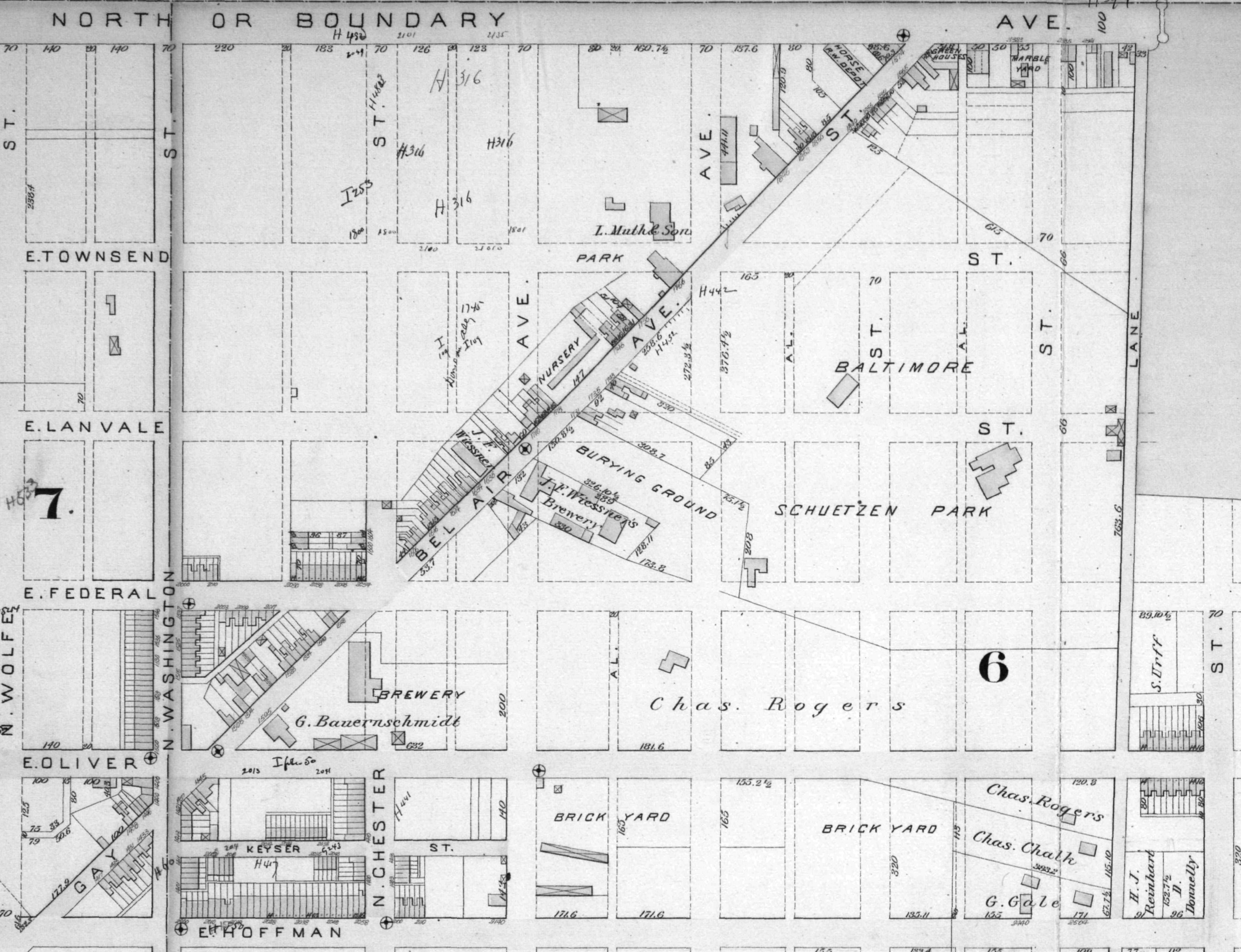
1882 map of Schuetzen Park boundaries with surveyed street grid

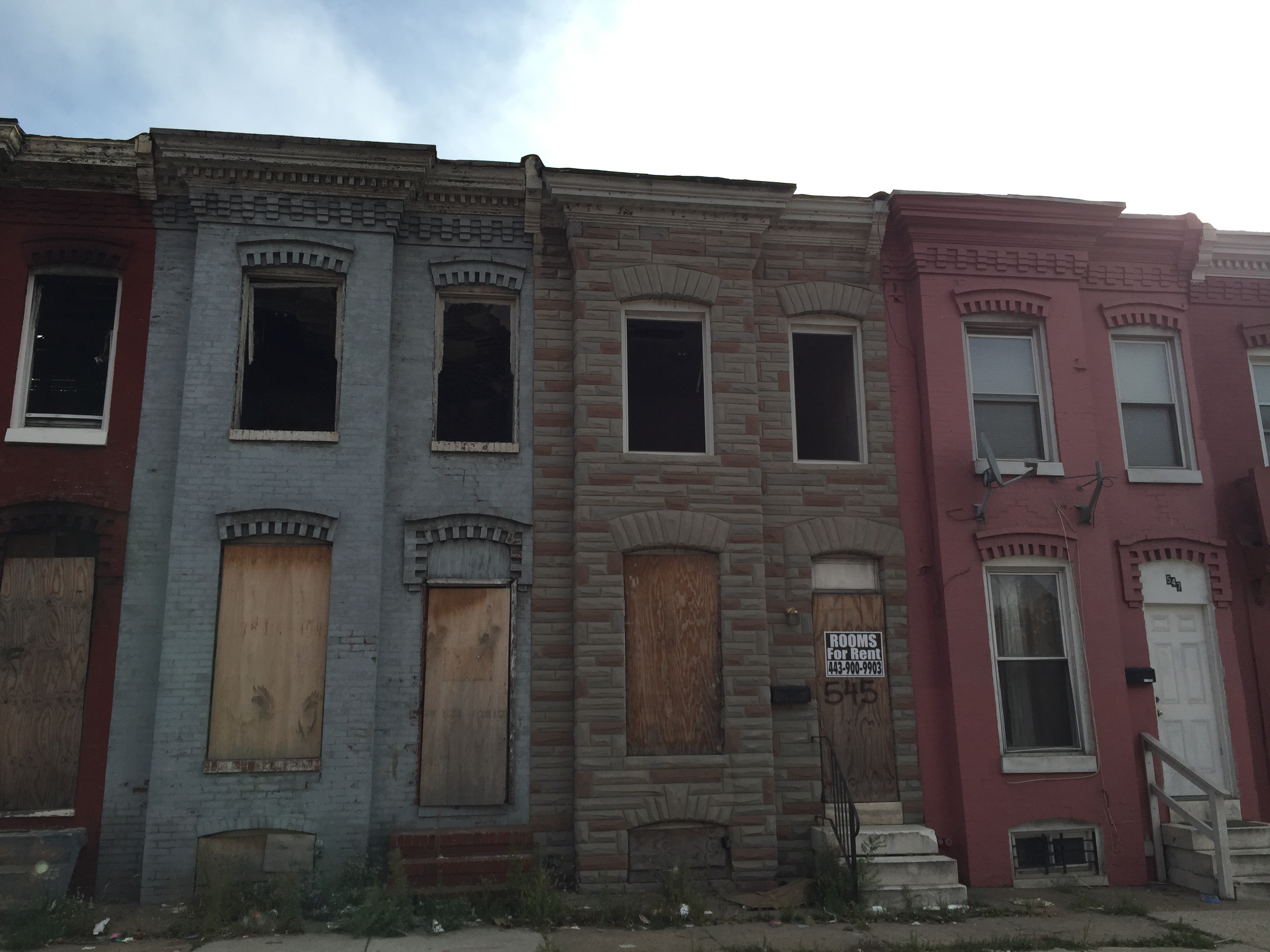
Homes such as these two-story working class dwellings were built in the park after it closed in the 1890s. Some were later abandoned, torn down, and in the 21st century restored to parcels of open land.

From the mid-to-late 19th century, Baltimore was home to two private ethnic German parks known as Schuetzen Park. The first and most prominent was the "Eastern Schuetzen" (1866–1895), established by the Schuetzen Verein ("Shooting Club," est. 1850). A second, "Western Schuetzen" (1871–1890), was located on the grounds of the Mount Clare plantation in Southwest Baltimore. These parks were a nexus of German immigrant community activity, functioning as social clubs for the lower and middle classes to gather for rifle shooting, picnics, bowling, dancing, and beer gardens. The popularity of beer drinking at the parks coincided with the growth of many nearby breweries. By 1895, however, the parks were compelled to close by the city due to the danger of rifle shooting near encroaching urban development.

== Eastern Schuetzen Park ==
The original park was established on approximately 20 acres in East Baltimore, purchased from George Appold, a leather dealer and a founder of the Merchants and Miners Transportation Company. It was roughly an eight-block area (see map) with the entrance on the east side of Belair Avenue (now North Gay Street), next to the present-day Wiessner-American Brewery building. As a private park with an admission fee, it featured rifle and archery ranges, picnic areas, bowling alleys, a ballroom, dining halls, and beer gardens.

The park hosted popular festivals that drew tens of thousands of attendees. Every May 1, or "May Day", crowds gathered to celebrate the start of summer with strong bock beer made by neighborhood German brewers. The club's annual August Schuetzenfest (shooting competition) was an even larger event. These festivals included parades with elaborate floats from brewers, and the winner of the shooting contest would be crowned "king." A "queen," draped in a heavy gold locket, was chosen by the president of the Schuetzen Society. Newspaper reports described the scenes as "busy, animated and ever-changing," with bands playing and dancers whirling. On the club's 1867 August event, a six-foot alligator caught in the city's Inner Harbor was exhibited. During Baltimore's 150-year anniversary celebration, in October 1880, an 8-mile-long parade worked its way through the city, it was said it took 5 hours for the head and tail of the parade to pass any given point; the parade's destination was Schuetzen Park (and the surrounding breweries), where a lengthy speech was given by Frederick Raine, in which he recognized the contributions of Germans in Baltimore.

The grounds included a large banquet hall that had dressing rooms, reception rooms, a stage, and a basement kitchen. This building, constructed in the early 1800s, was part of the adjacent mansion formerly owned by George Appold. The mansion featured a watchtower that provided a view of the city harbor and ships, reflecting Appold's business in a shipping company. In 1897, these buildings were purchased and converted into an industrial printing press and were likely demolished around 1920 to make way for working-class row houses.

The park was likely closed by c. 1895, based on a city map that showed streets and buildings there, however social activity at the park may have been declining since the early 1880s due to city streets already being surveyed, and the proliferation of other beer gardens and parks throughout the city and countryside. One old timer said that as city streets encroached closer to the park, city officials were concerned that shooting rifles was too dangerous and compelled them to close the park and sell the land. Nevertheless, the park was a financial success during its existence.

== Post-park developments ==
Between 1870 and 1930, the area in around the park was developed into row houses to accommodate the city's growing working-class population who streamed in for manufacturing jobs. Prohibition in the 1920s forced many German brewery workers to leave for lack of work, and the population of the neighborhood shifted to majority African American as whites moved out. The housing stock deteriorated from age, and today the former park is a blighted urban landscape of mostly abandoned row houses. The area in 2002 was added to the Baltimore East/South Clifton Park Historic District. In 2006, the City of Baltimore moved to acquire 200 abandoned properties in the area for demolition. As a result, there are now (again) some open green spaces and trees, where blocks of boarded up row houses once stood.

== Other Schuetzen Parks ==
The "Western Schuetzen" park was leased from the Carroll family at the Mount Clare plantation in 1871 in Southwest Baltimore. In 1890, the City of Baltimore purchased the Carroll estate property, including this park's land, which is today a public park. The two Schuetzen Parks in Eastern and Western Baltimore are often inaccurately conflated by modern sources as being the same place. Other Schuetzen Parks also existed throughout the country, including Schuetzen Park in Washington, D.C. (1866–1891), New York City, New Jersey, and Iowa.
