= J. W. Fiske & Company =

- Industry: Manufacturing
- Founded: 1863 in New York City , United States

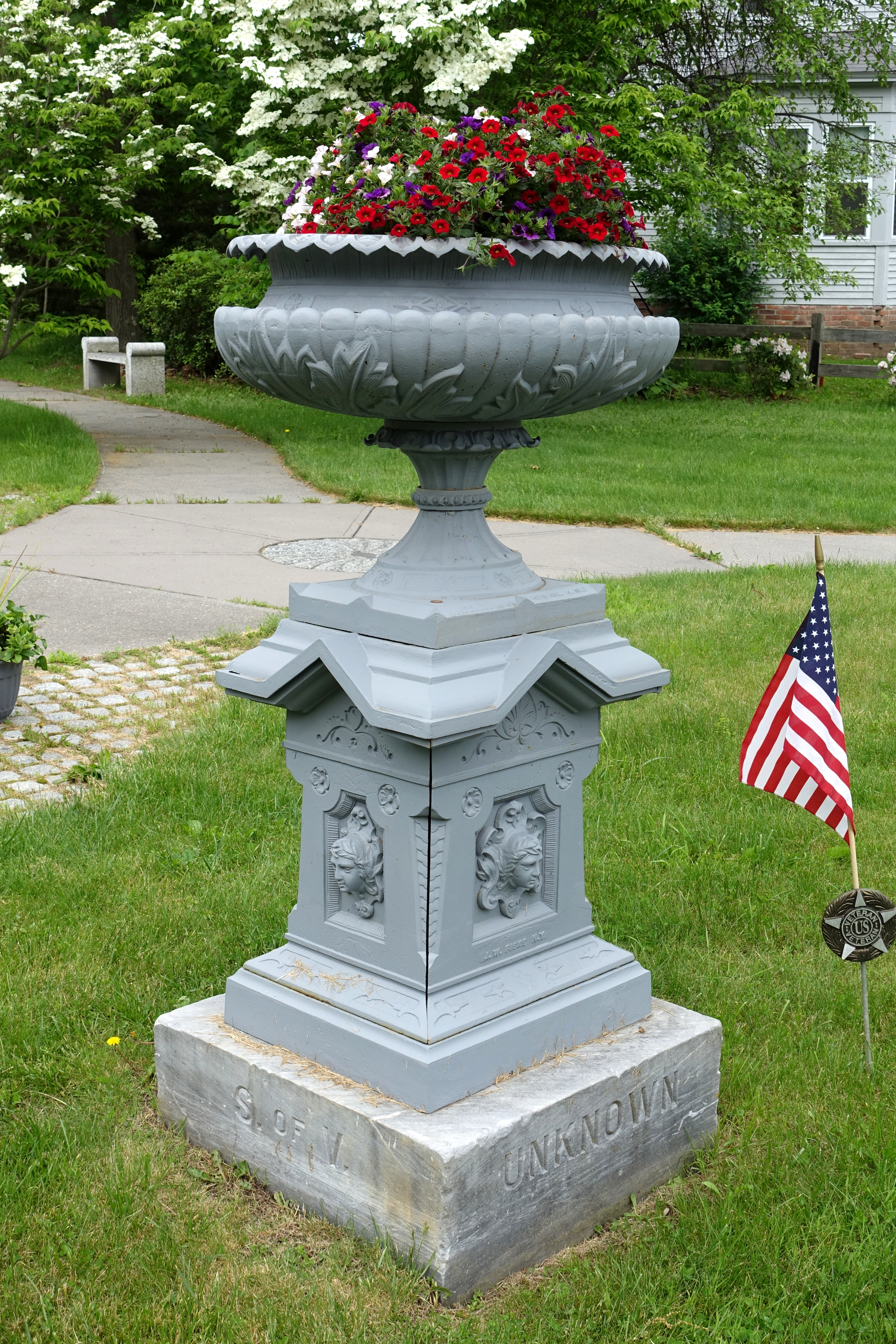
Decorative urn made by J. W. Fiske & Company

J. W. Fiske & Company of New York City was the most prominent American manufacturer of decorative cast iron and cast zinc in the second half of the nineteenth century. In addition to their wide range of garden fountains, statues, urns, and cast-iron garden furniture, they provided many of the cast-zinc Civil War memorials of small towns throughout the northern states following the American Civil War. These were commonly painted to imitate bronze.

The entrepreneurial founder, Joseph Winn Fiske (May 22, 1832 — October 20, 1903) out-sourced the iron and zinc-alloy foundry-work itself, and concentrated on the firm's connections with modellers on the one hand and customer relations on the other. Fiske, of a colonial family in Chelmsford, Massachusetts, spent some years as a merchandiser in Melbourne, Australia, before returning to the United States in 1857. He founded his business, at first in partnership with hardwareman Thomas W. Brown, in Boston (by 1862) and New York, December 1863. The "& Co." was dropped in 1862 in the business. Fiske's lavishly illustrated catalogues, issued at brief intervals, kept the firm in the public eye and incidentally show art historians how casually design patents were infringed in the nineteenth century.

Fiske's designs ranged from the naturalistic foliate designs that were the stock-in-trade of mid-Victorian style to sculptures after the Antique or neoclassical works of Antonio Canova or Bertel Thorvaldsen, suitable for park-like landscapes of estates and landscape cemeteries of formal schemes. Fiske was also noted for his hammered copper weather vanes, produced in Williamsburgh, Brooklyn.

Fiske's great rival in the decorative cast iron field was Jordan L. Mott's J. L. Mott Iron Works of New York City.

Since the later twentieth-century, unmarked pieces of decorative cast-iron of appropriate date are commonly attributed to J. W. Fiske, to improve their market value.

== See also ==
- Monumental Bronze Company
