= Alswel =

Historic house in Missouri, United States

- U.S. National Register of Historic Places
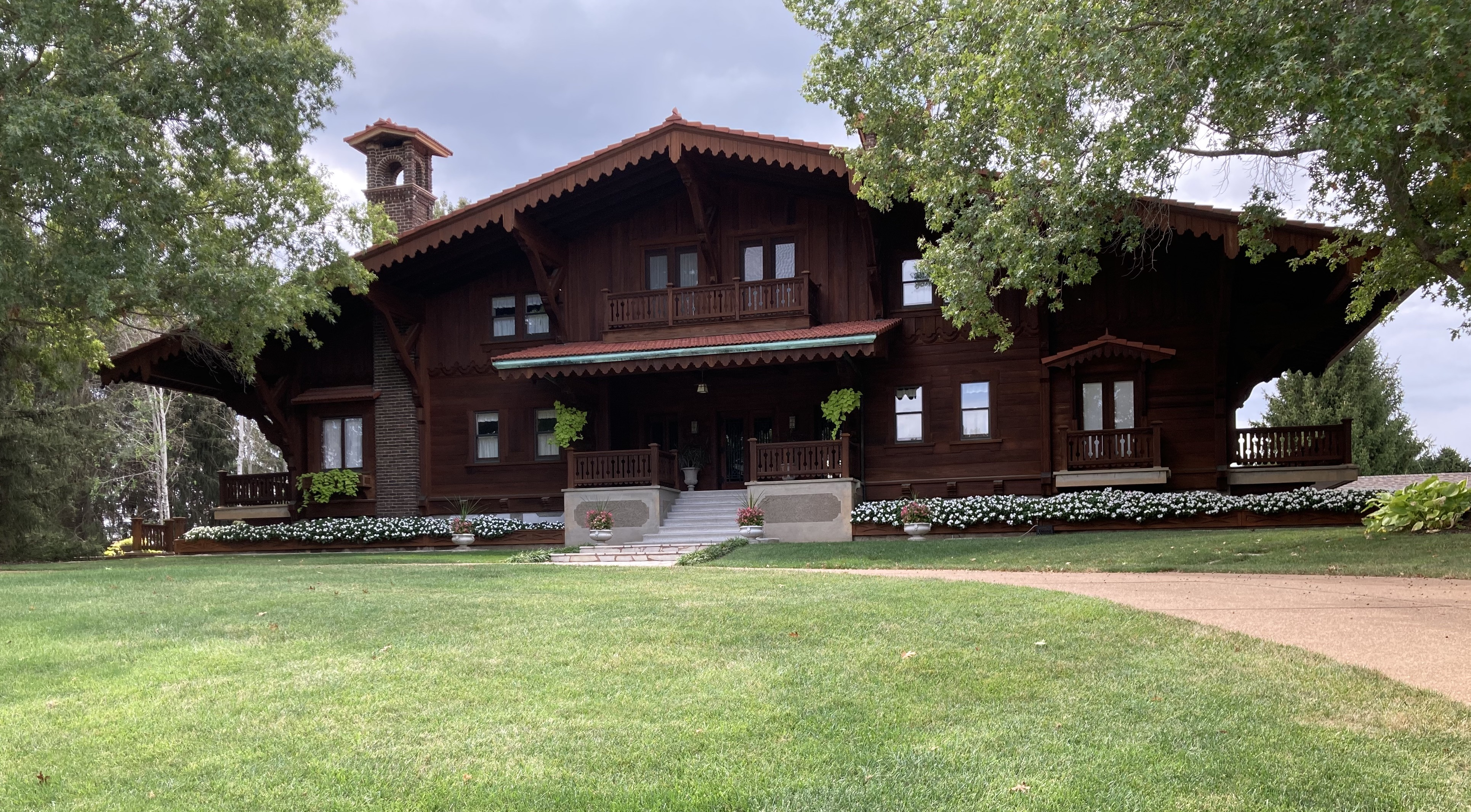

- Location within Missouri Location within the United States
- Location: 12720 Alswell Lane, Sunset Hills, MO 63128
- Coordinates: 38.5059°N 90.4044°W
- Area: 7418 square feet
- Built: 1911-1914
- Architect: Guy T. Norton
- Architectural style: Tyrolean Chalet
- NRHP reference No.: 88001460
- Added to NRHP: 1989

Alswel, also known as the William Lemp Estate House, is a house in Sunset Hills, Missouri built by German-American brewer William J. Lemp, Jr. in 1911. Designed by Lemp Brewery staff architect Guy Norton in the unusual Tyrolean Chalet style, it is situated on a bluff roughly 200 feet above the Meramec River in south St. Louis County, Missouri. The estate grounds once consisted of almost 200 acres, but sell-offs and residential subdivision have reduced this to a 2.1-acre lot on which the house currently sits.

== History ==
Although St. Louis had several bedroom communities served by rail by the 1900s, many of its business leaders preferred building country homes in the more secluded areas of south St. Louis County, often fanning out from Gravois Road in the now-municipalities of Sunset Hills and Grantwood Village. The area was especially popular with the city's beer-brewing elite, including the Griesediecks, the Busches, and the Lemps.

In 1910, brewer William J. Lemp, Jr. was just coming off of a very messy divorce from his first wife, Lillian, that had become sensationalized tabloid fodder in St. Louis society and was looking for a secluded retreat. Purchasing 192 acres on the Meramec bluffs, construction of Alswel and several other outbuildings and servant's houses had been completed by 1914. By 1915 Lemp was remarried to the former Ellie Koehler Limberg and the couple took-up full-time residence at Alswel, away from the city. By all accounts, they lived a happy life for the next several years. Lemp's brother Edwin had built his own estate, Cragwold, on the Meramec bluffs a few miles upriver in 1911.

== Financial and legal troubles ==
The Lemp Brewery was not able to weather the effects of Prohibition, with the liquidation of the brewery assets for 8 cents on the dollar contributing to Lemp's suicide in 1922. Financial and legal troubles for the Alswel estate commenced shortly thereafter. In 1924, Ellie filed suit against Lillian (a successor trustee) and William and Lillian's son, William Lemp III, to force a sale of the estate and it was auctioned from the courthouse steps in Clayton in 1925.

William III would ultimately gain clear control of the estate and he and his wife Agnes were living there by the 1930s. However, they carried a hefty mortgage underwritten by the Methodist Episcopal Church (MEC), for which they subsequently missed several payments. MEC filed suit in 1934 and, when the Lemp's failed to meet an extended schedule for payment, Alswel was again sold at the courthouse in 1936, this time to MEC. By 1946, developers had purchased 117 acres for residential building and further sell-off in the 1980s reduced the land area in which Alswel currently sits to just over 2 acres.

== Recent events ==
In 1989, Alswel was recognized with listing on the National Register of Historic Places of the National Park Service. Subdivision left some of the original estate's structures, like a cylindrical stone observation platform (see below), sequestered on neighboring residential lots. By the middle 1990s, most of the other outbuildings and servants' homes, which had been built in the same Tyrolean style but now resided on separate smaller lots in the area, had been razed. The main Alswel "big house" is still a private residence today.

== Gallery ==
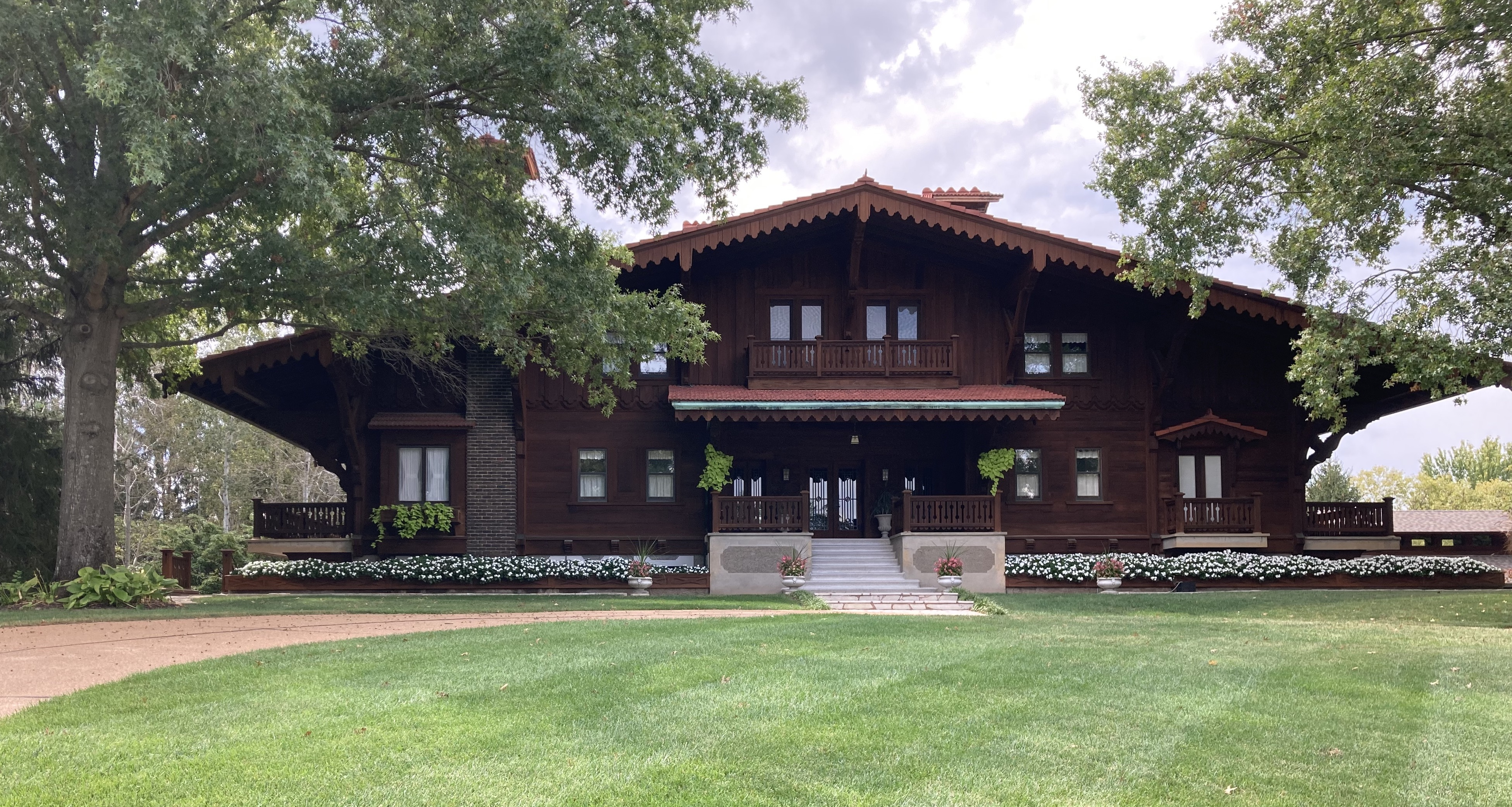
slightly different view in southwest direction

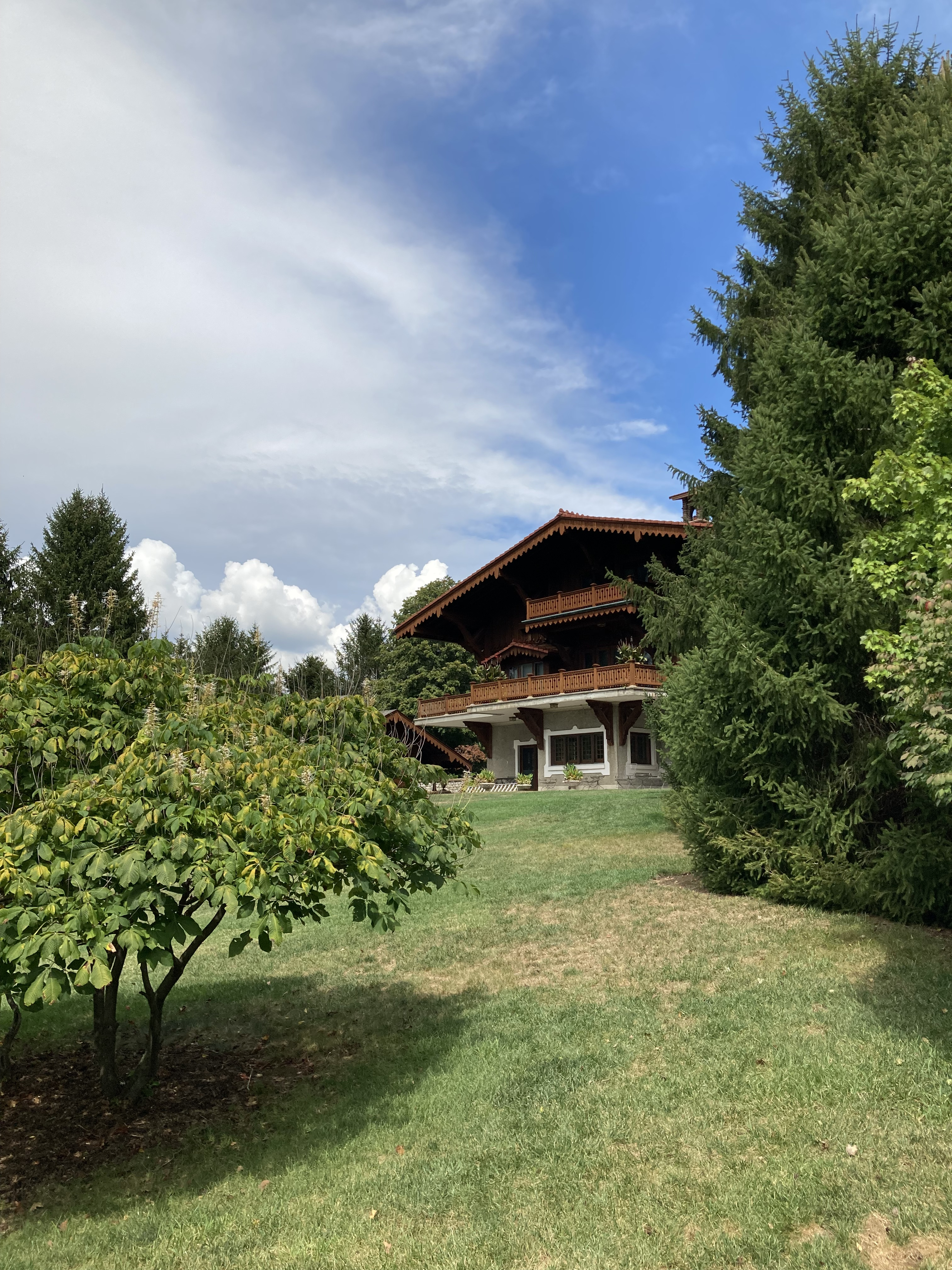
back of Alswel looking up to the north

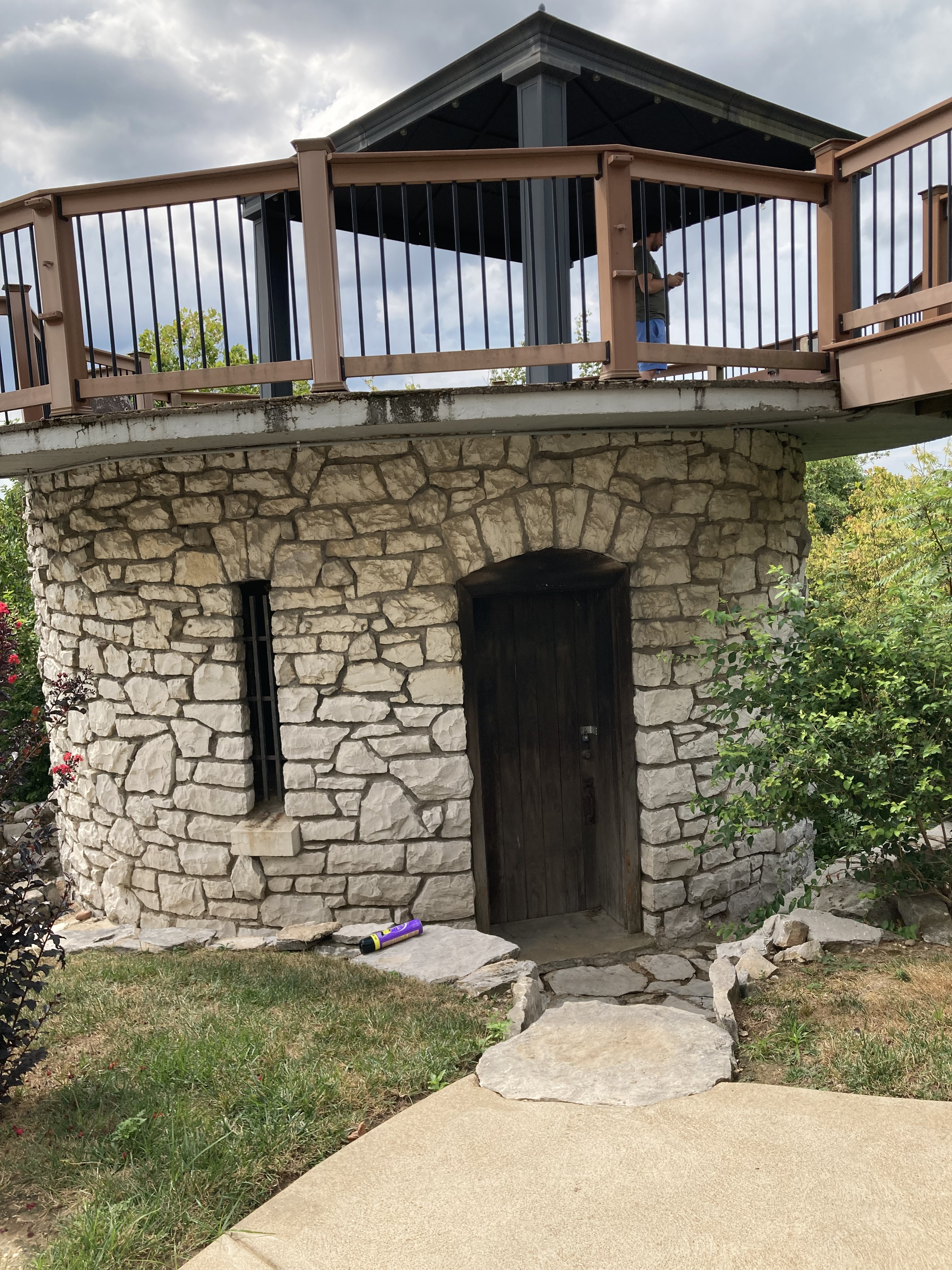
scenic viewing platform

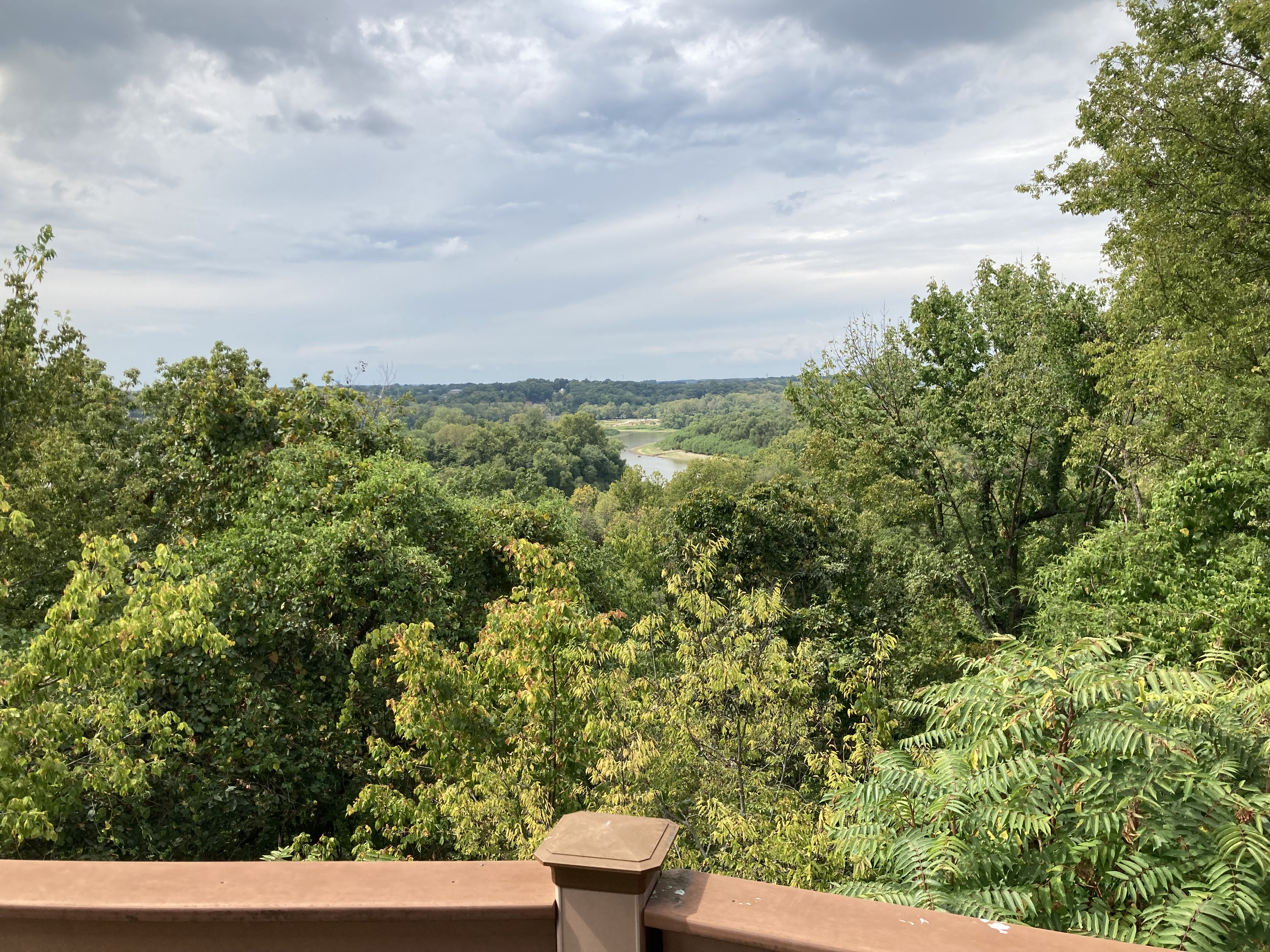
view from the platform looking west over the Meramec River valley

== See also ==
- Cragwold
- Lemp Mansion
- Lemp Brewery
