= Barry-Wehmiller =

Manufacturing technology company

Barry-Wehmiller Companies Inc
- Type: Private
- Industry: Packaging machine, Converters, Conveyor system, Engineering and IT Consulting
- Founded: 1885
- Headquarters: St. Louis, Missouri, USA, Saint Louis
- Key people: Kyle Chapman, Chairman and CEO
- Revenue: ▲$3 billion USD (2022)
- Number of employees: 12,000 (2022)
- Subsidiaries: Accraply, BW Design Group, BW Flexible Systems, BW Forsyth Partners, BW Integrated Systems, BW Papersystems, Carr Biosystems, PCMC, Pneumatic Scale Angelus, Synerlink, W+D
- Website: www.barrywehmiller.com

Barry-Wehmiller Companies is a global supplier of manufacturing technology and services based in St. Louis, Missouri. In 2016 it was ranked no. 10 on the St. Louis Business Journal's list of the city's Top 150 Privately Held Companies.

Although it was founded in 1885 as a maker of machinery for the brewing industry, since 1987, Barry-Wehmiller has acquired more than 80 companies that provide equipment and services for a variety of industries: packaging, paper converting, sheeting, corrugating, engineering, and IT consulting.

Barry-Wehmiller's former Chairman and CEO, Bob Chapman, is co-author of the book Everybody Matters: The Extraordinary Power of Caring For Your People Like Family. He regularly writes about issues relating to leadership and workplace culture on his blog, Truly Human Leadership.

== History ==
=== 1885-1975 ===
By the 1880s, St. Louis, Missouri had become the third-largest city in the United States in the production of beer. The city would still hold that ranking by the end of the decade, but within that time span, its production would increase by almost a million barrels a year.

That time period was one of rapid technological advancement in brewing, not only in St. Louis but all over the United States. The largest brewers in the city, the Lemp Brewery and Anheuser-Busch were beginning to utilize mechanical refrigeration in beer production and transport, while more modern techniques of bottling and pasteurization would also help the product stay fresh longer for wider distribution.

It was within the midst of massive growth within the industry, in 1885, that Thomas Barry bought into a machine shop that provided production equipment and repair service to local breweries. In 1890, Barry's brother-in-law Alfred Wehmiller also joined the company and by 1897, both men purchased the company fully and it became the Barry-Wehmiller Machinery Company. Under the Barry-Wehmiller partnership, the company developed and began offering its own pasteurizers and bottle washers and grew from a regional to worldwide supplier. Their customers not only included St. Louis-based breweries such as Anheuser-Busch, Griesedieck Brothers beer, Falstaff Brewing Corporation and Hyde Park, but other national beer makers, including Joseph Schlitz Brewing Company and Miller Brewing Company.

Throughout the years of Prohibition in the United States—1920-1933—Barry-Wehmiller focused its attention on the soft drink and dairy industries, as well as their international brewing business.

As market challenges caused the business to struggle into the 1950s, the Wehmiller family sold controlling interest in the company in 1957 to William Chapman, formerly an auditor for Arthur Anderson who had been hired as treasurer in 1953. The company would continue to struggle through the 1960s and mid-1970s.

=== 1975-1987 ===
Robert H. (Bob) Chapman joined Barry-Wehmiller in 1969 at his father, William Chapman's request. Bob Chapman had previously been an accountant at Price-Waterhouse. Upon the elder Chapman's sudden death of a heart attack in 1975, his son assumed control of the company, which was then worth $18 million. However, within a month of Bob Chapman becoming CEO and chairman of the Board of Barry-Wehmiller, the company's bank pulled their loan. Despite these issues, Chapman was able to cut costs and improve financial performance to grow the company to $22 million in 1976.

Chapman also began investing in new technology, such as solar energy. Barry-Wehmiller developed a solar energy system to heat pasteurizers, which became a high-profile technology due to the energy crisis of the 1970s. Anheuser-Busch was the first to purchase the system, which was installed in its Jacksonville, Florida brewery. By 1980, Barry-Wehmiller's revenue grew to $71 million.

Despite the company's growth, by 1983 a number of factors began working against the company, bringing its revenues down to $55 million. The consolidation of the brewing industry slowed sales of Barry-Wehmiller's historic businesses and technical challenges in newly developed technologies were incurring rising warranty and development costs. Facing a loss of $5 million, the company's banks froze their line of credit and asked for repayment of their loans.

In 1984 Chapman – based on his admiration of Chuck Knight, CEO of Emerson Electric – began acquiring companies to expand Barry-Wehmiller's markets and technology. Because of the company's financial situation, many of these acquisitions were in poor health, but after a number of businesses were acquired, their combined operations began to create profitable enterprises.

By 1986, leaders of many of Barry-Wehmiller's acquisitions in the United Kingdom saw an opportunity to take those companies public. In May 1987, the IPO of those companies took place on the London Stock Exchange in an offering that was oversubscribed 35 times -- $1.1 billion for $28 million in stock. Barry-Wehmiller paid off its debt and was left with $28 million in cash. Harvard Business School has written a case study on the London IPO offering.

=== 1987-present ===
After experiencing two near-fatal crises in ten years, Chapman and Barry-Wehmiller decided to continue to pursue their acquisition strategy and transform the company into one that made machinery to serve a variety of markets in the industrial packaging industry.

The first acquisition of significance for Barry-Wehmiller was Pneumatic Scale, a publicly traded hundred-year-old business based in Quincy, Massachusetts. Over the next almost 30 years, Barry-Wehmiller would acquire 82 companies that are divided into 11 divisions: PneumaticScaleAngelus, Hayssen Flexible Systems, BW Container Systems, BW Papersystems, Accraply, Thiele Technologies, Paper Converting Machine Company, Design Group, Barry-Wehmiller International, Synerlink and Winkler+Dünnebier.

Bob Chapman and Barry-Wehmiller's cultural transformation story was written about in Simon Sinek’s 2014 book, Leaders Eat Last.

Chapman and co-author Raj Sisodia – the co-author and co-founder of Conscious Capitalism – released their book, Everybody Matters: The Extraordinary Power of Caring For Your People Like Family in October 2015. The book tells the story of Barry-Wehmiller’s business history that led to Chapman’s change in leadership as well as detailing many of the company’s internal cultural programs. Inc. (magazine) called Chapman one of “15 Writers Shaping How We Think About Leadership.” Forbes called Everybody Matters one of the best business books of 2015.
