= BW Papersystems Hamburg =

German manufacturing company

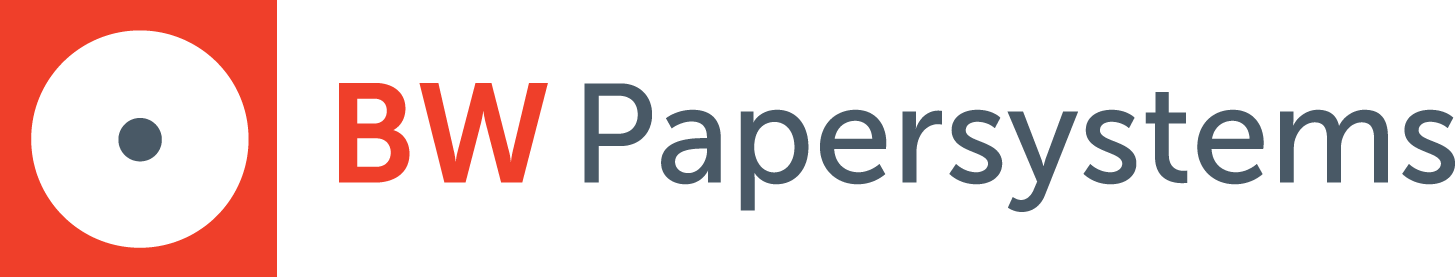
- Company type: Subsidiary GmbH
- Industry: Mechanical engineering
- Founded: 1866; 160 years ago
- Headquarters: Wedel, Germany
- Key people: Olaf Dreger, Managing Director
- Number of employees: Approx. 180 (2022)
- Parent: Barry-Wehmiller
- Website: bwpapersystems.com

BW Papersystems Hamburg is a German manufacturing company based in Wedel. It supplies machinery for the paper manufacturing and converting industries.

The company is one of the four German locations of BW Papersystems, a division of the United States based Barry-Wehmiller group of companies.

== History ==
New generation 16 pocket cut-size sheeter including dual packaging line, installed at Portucel Soporcel Group in Setùbal, Portugal

BW Papersystems Hamburg was founded in 1866 (as E.C.H. Will GmbH). Former E.C.H. Will and its sister companies Kugler-Womako GmbH and Sheboygan, WI based Pemco Inc. (including also SHM and Wrapmatic brands) became part of BW Papersystems in 2014, joining MarquipWardUnited Inc.

The brand name 'WillPemcoBielomatik' was established in 2015 as a combination of the brands E.C.H. Will, Pemco and the paper processing division of bielomatik Leuze GmbH + Co. KG.

In 2016, BW Papersystems Hamburg celebrated the 150th anniversary of its original brand E.C.H. Will.

In 2018, the company acquired the rotary cross cutting technology from the Germany based firm Questec, for the converting of very light and thin paper and film.

== Products and services ==
The portfolio of the brand WillPemcoBielomatik includes cut-size sheeters and complete packaging lines for the production of communication paper (2-16 pockets), folio-size sheeting machines for paper and cardboard, ream wrapper for large paper sheets, converting lines for the production of exercise books and ruled and un-ruled layers as well as solutions for the industrial production of digitally printed books.
