= Walter Brewing Company =

American brewing company founded by German-born brothers

- Industry: Brewing
- Founded: 1889; 137 years ago in Eau Claire, Wisconsin
- Founder: Johannes Walter

The Walter Brewing Company had several locations founded by brothers, one in Pueblo, Colorado in 1898 by Martin Walter, with addition of a Trinidad, CO location, The Walter Brewing Co. in Eau Claire founded in 1889 by Johannes Walter following a catastrophic fire in his first Spencer, WI facility and a move to Eau Claire, Appleton Brewing Company by George Walter, West Bend Lithia by Martin Walter, and Walter Bros of Menasha, WI.

Their famous Pueblo Brewery had changed hands at least sixteen times in the thirty years before Walter's was founded.

== Walter family brewing history ==
The Walter brothers, Johannes, Georg, Martin, Christian and Matthaus, emigrated from their hometown of Bergfelden, Germany and came to America to find a better life than what they could find in Germany. Their path led them from Hamburg, Germany, to New Orleans, Louisiana, and to Wisconsin, although Martin went further along to Pueblo, CO. Wisconsin had a large German immigrant population at the time and the region reminded them of their home in the Black Forest region of Germany. Their father was a cobbler, family legend purportedly them having expanding on their knowledge of the brewing trade at Miller in Milwaukee before striking out on their own.

Martin Walter's company began making beer in Pueblo, CO in 1898, and continued until 1975. Martin headed westward with his family earlier due to the Menasha, WI brewery unable to support the financial needs of an ever growing family from 3 (Martin, Matthaus and Christian) of the 5 Walter Brothers. He settled on Pueblo and began his endeavor to expand the family business. The company faced several small recessions during its existence, including the closing of the plant during state and federal Prohibition after 1915. Martin died before prohibition, reportedly due to heart ailments.

After prohibition, Martin, son of George Walter of the Appleton Brewery, joined his Wisconsin cousins from Appleton, WI to buy their namesake uncle's company from John's widow, The John Walter Brewing Company, and reopen the Eau Claire, Wisconsin institution as The Walter Brewing Company. The Pueblo company was awarded a "Gold Award" in 1956 and the "Excellence of Quality" award in 1972 by the Brewers Association of America. The Walter Brewing Company of Pueblo closed permanently on January 3, 1975.

Subsequently, in 1975, The Walter Brewing Company of Eau Claire acquired the Pueblo labeling from General Brewing and introduced the slightly modified Pueblo label to the regional market it served in 1976. Walter's of Eau Claire also won awards for its quality in 1975 but was often considered a cheap local beer by many of its local detractors who preferred the status of the brews from large corporate brewers, Anheuser-Busch, Coors, Miller, Pabst and such.

The Walter brothers created a large brewing dynasty, that had it survived the trials and tribulations from nearly a century of brewing operations that rivaled that of the Buschs in its day, likely would still be in operation today had it been destined to be.

=== Johannes Walter ===
Johannes began his first brewery in Spencer, Wisconsin in 1874 and moved on to Eau Claire, Wisconsin, in 1889 after his first facility burnt to the ground. He purchased the Dells Brewery in Eau Claire from a branch of the Leinenkugel family who were not having success in Eau Claire at the time. He immediately changed the name to the John Walter Brewing Company. Johannes died during Prohibition and his widow sold the brewery and assets to other family members from Appleton, WI who offered to purchase it after prohibition. Walter's Beer is currently being brewed by Northwoods Brewery and Restaurant as a micro-brew with a variation of the post prohibition Eau Claire Walter's label as well as in Pueblo, CO with the Pueblo Label similar to the last one used on Eau Claire.

=== George Walter ===
Georg (George) purchased the Star Brewery of Appleton, Wisconsin, changing its name to the George Walter Brewing Company. He eventually purchased a neighboring brewery on an adjacent block on Oneida St. and combined the two facilities together to form into his Appleton brewing complex. George died in 1899. The site is currently occupied by the Appleton Police Department. Adler Brau is currently being produced as a micro-brew by Appleton Brewing Company.

=== Martin, Christian and Matthaus Walter ===
Martin, Christian and Matthaus operated the Menasha, Wisconsin based Walter Brothers Brewing Company with their Gem and Gold Label beers. Eventually, Martin headed west and determined Pueblo, Colorado an opportune place to start brewing. Originally named Mountain Dew and eventually called Gold Label, in the mid-20th century it was known as Walter's. Martin expanded his breweries in Colorado to Trinidad, Colorado, acquiring an existing brewery through a business loan default. His other brothers also acquired and operated West Bend Lithia near Milwaukee, Wisconsin. Lithia and Old Timer's are currently not in production. Walter's is being produced in Pueblo as a micro-brew. Sometime around 1999 German born West Bend resident Gunter Woog bought the Lithia trademark. In 2011 he attempted to relaunch the brand working with Sprecher Brewing of Glendale, Wisconsin. In 2012 it was being sold in regional clubs and bars, and seemed to have a "following". By 2018 the only listing of availability on the Sprecher Lithia website is a questionable one in Canada.

== 1970s ==
The 1970s saw tumultuous times for the Walter Brewing name. Appleton and West Bend closed in 1972. Pueblo in 1975 a few years after Paul Kalmanovitz acquired the brewery. Trinidad closed in the 1940s and Menasha closed in the 1950s.

== Mike Healy ==
The 1970s saw tumultuous times for the Walter Brewing name. Geo. Walter Brg. Co. Appleton and West Bend Lithia closed in 1972. Pueblo in 1975 not long after Paul Kalmanovitz acquired the brewery. Other Walter's facilities, Trinidad closed in the 1940s and Menasha closed in the 1950s. The Eau Claire brewery was sold to Mike Healy, an Irish attorney from Chicago who worked for U.S. Bank Note, in 1985, renamed Hibernia Brewing Ltd. and operated the facility with the introduction of many award-winning craft beers such as Eau Claire All Malt, Oktober Fest, Winter Brau and a Dunkelweisen, along with Walter's and Walter's Special. When Healy bought the brewery it was producing 12,000 barrels, and within three years production was over 32,000 barrels. The future looked bright, the brewery was in the black, and new markets were being opened. At this point, however, a $100,000.00 shipment of under-pasteurized beer was released to the new markets of Ohio and California. The brewmaster John Walter and assistant brewmaster John Walter II were blamed and fired immediately. Insurance covered the recall however the damage done to consumer confidence was believed to be insurmountable.

== Revivals ==
Ed Miller and Cynthia Ancil, purchased the brewery from dairy equipment liquidator Jerry Goldberg, attempted a rebirth in the 1990s, contract brewing Walter's at Jos. Huber in Monroe, WI, but that venture eventually failed. Many fixtures and metal items were stripped from the brewery and sold as scrap leaving not much more than a brewery shell with no real brewing equipment to remain. A brewery it was no longer without its equipment to make beer.

Northwoods in Eau Claire currently offers their rendition of Walter's Beer created at their facility without the guidance and support of the Walter Brewing Family.

Walter's Beer in Pueblo, Colorado is currently brewing Walter's Beer and keeps in contact with the Walter family following its work with the family and Walter's-Eau Claire Brewmaster John Walter.

== See also ==
- List of defunct consumer brands
- List of defunct breweries in the United States
