= Hudson-Sharp Machine Company =

Hudson-Sharp Machine Co.
- Industry: Plastic bags
- Founded: 1910
- Headquarters: Green Bay, Wisconsin, United States

Hudson-Sharp Machine Company is active in the design and manufacture of plastic bag making machinery, pouch making equipment, and reclosable packaging solutions.

== Company profile ==
The Hudson-Sharp Machine Company is involved in the design and manufacture of plastic bag making machinery, pouch making equipment, and reclosable packaging solutions. With manufacturing and sales throughout the world, Hudson-Sharp has been in business for over 100 years. A partial list of product categories include:

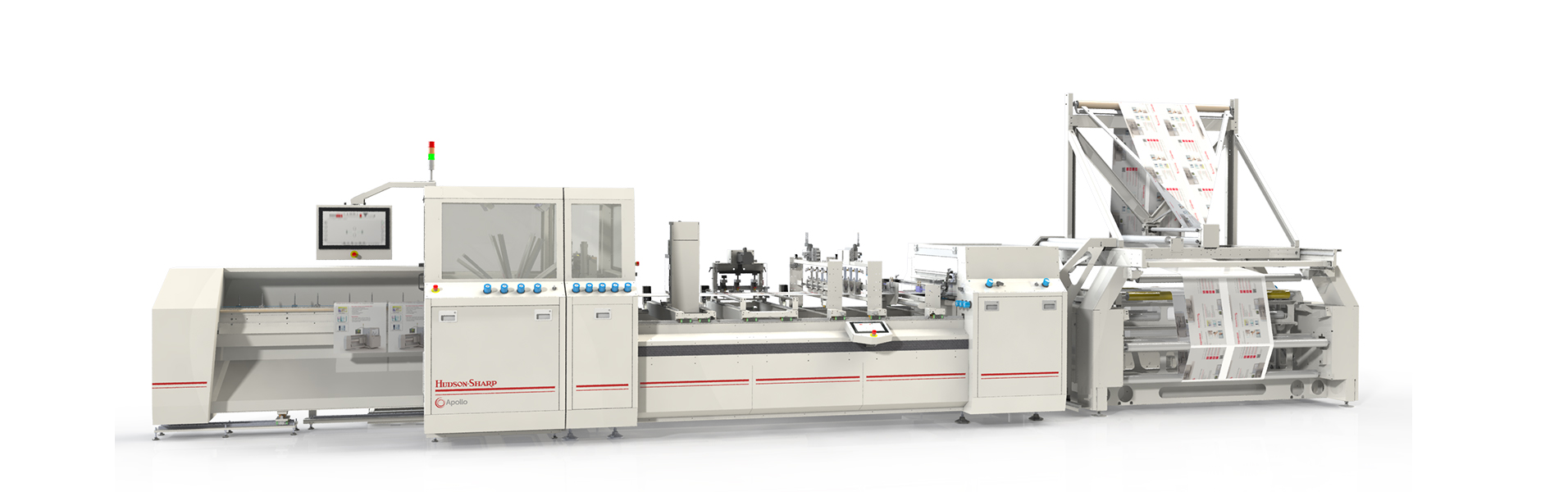
Hudson Sharp's high speed wicketer Apollo

- Wicketers
- Pouch
- INNO-LOK

- Pour & Lok

- Flat Belt
- Continuous Motion
- Bottomseal
- Attachments & Accessories

== History ==
1870
A small machine shop began operation along the East River in what is now the city of Green Bay, WI, United States. The company repaired steamboats and manufactured parts for sawmill machinery.

1910
David Hudson & Alexander Sharp took over the small shop and expanded the company into developing equipment for paper mills, winders for toilet tissue, and produced high-speed folders for tissue and napkins.

1925
Hudson-Sharp began manufacturing printing presses and manufactured the first central impression aniline press built in the United States.

1947
S.J. Campbell purchased the Hudson-Sharp Machine Company and conceived, designed, and patented the Campbell Wrapper, the world's first horizontal form, fill, and seal machine. Variations of the Campbell Wrapper are still used today throughout the world in wrapping candy, cheese, bakery products, and other various items.

1956
FMC Corporation acquired Hudson-Sharp as a part of the Packaging Machinery Division with divisional headquarters in Horsham, PA. Over the next decade, the company continued to grow by introducing several innovative packaging machinery lines. The first side-weld bag machine produced was nicknamed the "Flyswatter". Also, the first wicket stacker machine was developed.

Besides innovations, Hudson-Sharp introduced their products into new regions around the globe, specifically the Australia/Asia region. Those regions are still supported to this day.

1967
Support began in European markets as operations began in Aalst, Belgium. The Aalst facility was responsible for the sales and service of plastic bag converting equipment, the manufacture of machinery for cardboard and plastic set-up boxes, horizontal packaging machinery, and paper tissue machines.

1970
Wicketer development continues and Servo technology was introduced.

1978
High-speed rotary side-weld machines for the production of large trash bags were introduced.

1986
Plastic grocery bag line introduced.

1989
The first commercially-produced, servo-driven wicketer was introduced.

1997
Hudson-Sharp introduces INNO-LOK pre-zippered film reclosable packaging.

1998
Divestiture from FMC becomes The Hudson-Sharp Machine Company once again.

2000
Hot melt glue patch handle line introduced.

2004
Hudson-Sharp acquires Amplas and expands the product offering of bottom-seal technology.

2006
Side Gusset Bottom Seal Pouch Machine with patented Inno-Lok transverse direction zipper applicator introduced.

2007
NTR800 Roll to Roll Machine introduced.

2008
Hudson-Sharp introduces new generation servo pouch machinery.

A new packaging design was introduced called, Pour & Lok. It is a side gusseted, pour spout packaging application for pre-zippered roll stock.

2009
Hudson-Sharp is acquired by Thiele Technologies, part of the family of Barry-Wehmiller Companies. Thiele Technologies acquires certain assets of RO-AN through a secured third-party sales transaction.

2010
100-year anniversary of the Hudson-Sharp Machine Company.

2019
The Hudson-Sharp Machine Company joins the PCMC family and continues to be involved in the design and manufacture of plastic bag-making machinery, pouch-making equipment, and reclosable packaging solutions.
