= Falstaff Brewing Corporation =

American brewery

- Industry: Alcoholic beverage
- Founded: 1903 in St. Louis, Missouri
- Key people: John Adam Lemp, founder; William J. Lemp, Griesedieck Brothers
- Products: Beers, lagers, malt beverages
- Owner: Pabst Brewing Company

The Falstaff Brewing Corporation was an American brewery located in St. Louis, Missouri. With roots in the 1838 Lemp Brewery of St. Louis, the company was renamed after the Shakespearean character Sir John Falstaff in 1903. Production peaked in 1965 with 7,010,218 barrels brewed and then dropped 70 percent in the next 10 years. While its smaller labels linger on today, its main label Falstaff Beer went out of production in 2005. The rights to the brand are owned by Pabst Brewing Company.

== History ==
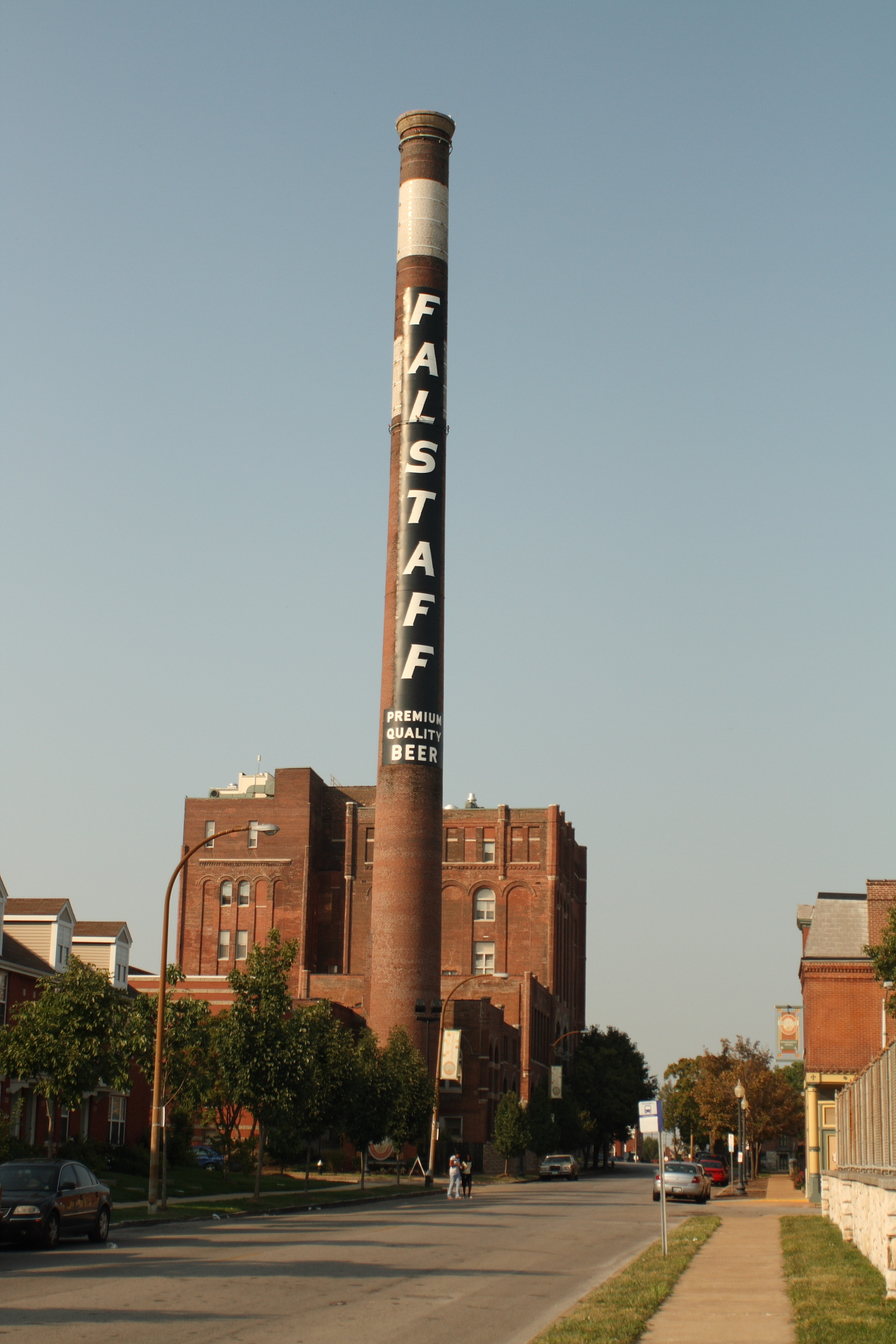
The Falstaff Brewery plant #5 located in north St. Louis city. The facility was converted to apartments in 1985.

Falstaff Brewing's earliest form was as the Lemp Brewery, founded in 1840 in St. Louis by German immigrant Johann Adam Lemp (1798–1862). Over the next 80 years, the Lemp family was devastated by personal tragedies as it built its beer empire over the caves of St. Louis. It adopted its famous "Blue Ribbon" moniker, with an 1898 trial prohibiting the Storz Brewing Company of Omaha from tying blue ribbons on its bottles. The Lemp Brewery company closed in 1921 and sold its Falstaff brand to the brewery then named Griesedieck Beverage Company. Griesedieck Beverage was renamed the Falstaff Corporation and survived Prohibition by selling near beer, soft drinks, and cured hams under the Falstaff name. Falstaff Brewing was a publicly traded company on the New York Stock Exchange, which was rare for a brewing industry in which families closely guarded their ownership.

When Prohibition was repealed in 1933, the first two cases of beer made by the brewery were airlifted from nearby Curtiss Stienberg Airport to the governors of Illinois and Missouri. After Prohibition, the company expanded greatly. Its first acquisition was the 1936 purchase of the Krug Brewery in Omaha, which made Falstaff the first brewery to operate plants in two different states. Other facilities bought in this period included the National Brewing Company of New Orleans in 1937; the Berghoff Brewing Company of Fort Wayne, Indiana, in 1954; the Galveston-Houston Brewing Company of Galveston, Texas, in 1956; San Jose, California in 1952-1973; and the Mitchell Brewing Company of El Paso in 1956.

By the 1960s, Falstaff was the third-largest brewer in America, with several plants nationwide. The 1965 acquisition of the Narragansett Brewing Company of Rhode Island proved disastrous, with the state government of Rhode Island pursuing an antitrust case against them. The Supreme Court found in Falstaff's favor in United States v. Falstaff Brewing Corp. (1973), but the company never recovered.

Fortunes declined throughout the 1970s as consolidation swept the beer industry. The company was bought in April 1975 by the S&P Company, owned by Paul Kalmanovitz. In the interim, Chicago White Sox announcer Harry Caray endorsed the brew in live TV commercials, many times with a glass of beer in his hand and sipping it. Kalmanovitz also owned General Brewing, Pabst, Pearl, Olympia, and Stroh's. That year, the company ranked 11th in sales nationally and the original St. Louis plant was closed. The brewery Falstaff bought in San Francisco in 1971 was closed just a few years later, in 1978. Subsequent closures included New Orleans in 1979, Cranston and Galveston in 1981, and Omaha in 1983. The Vancouver, Washington, brewery that began producing Falstaff in 1975 closed in 1985, with the entire operation relocated to Zhaoqing, China, and reopened there as a Pabst brewery. After the 1990 closing of the last Falstaff brewery in Fort Wayne, the brand name became a licensed property of Pabst, which continued to produce Falstaff beer through other breweries. Selling only 1,468 barrels of Falstaff in 2004, Pabst discontinued production of Falstaff in May 2005.

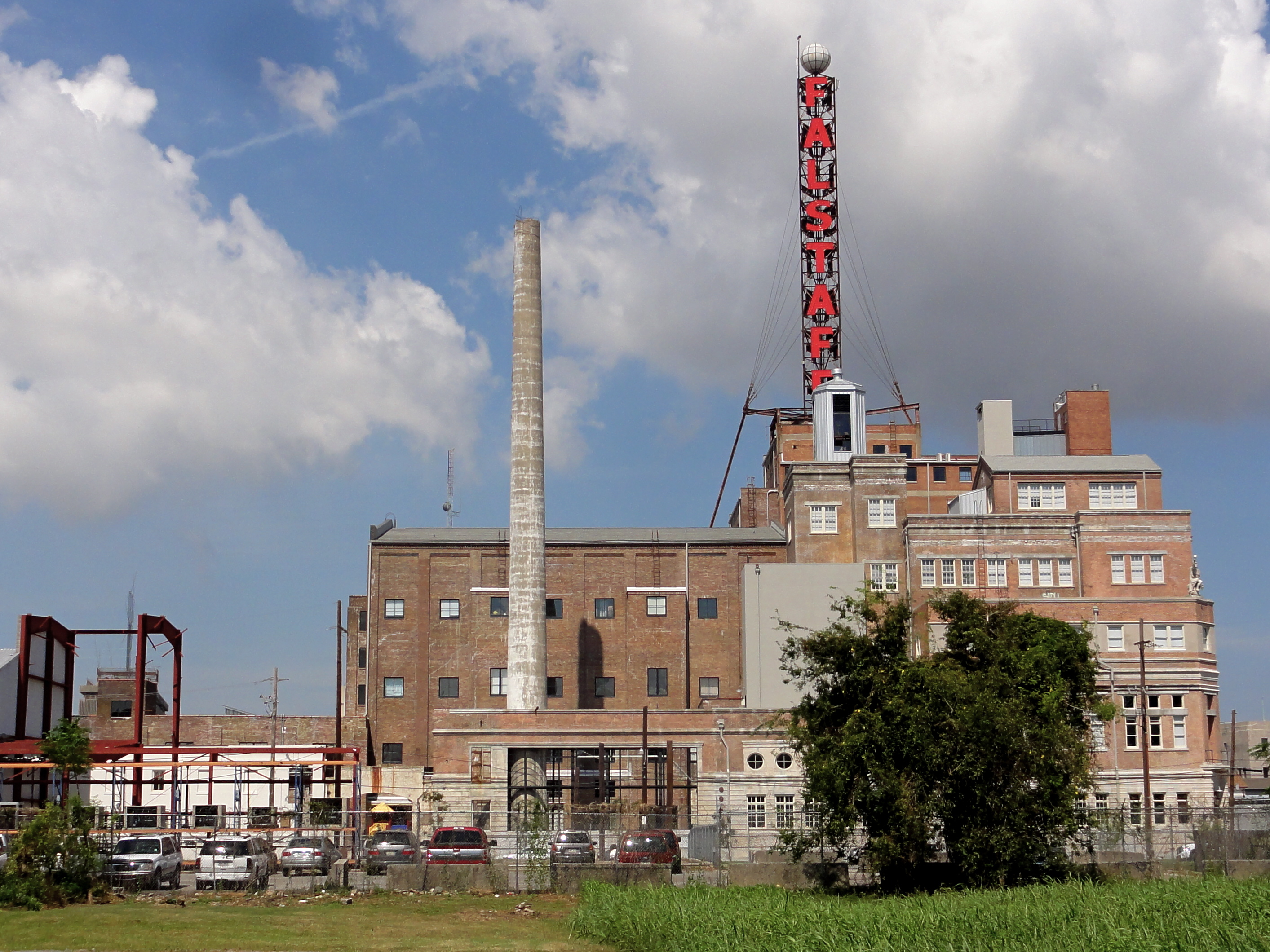
Falstaff Brewery building, New Orleans

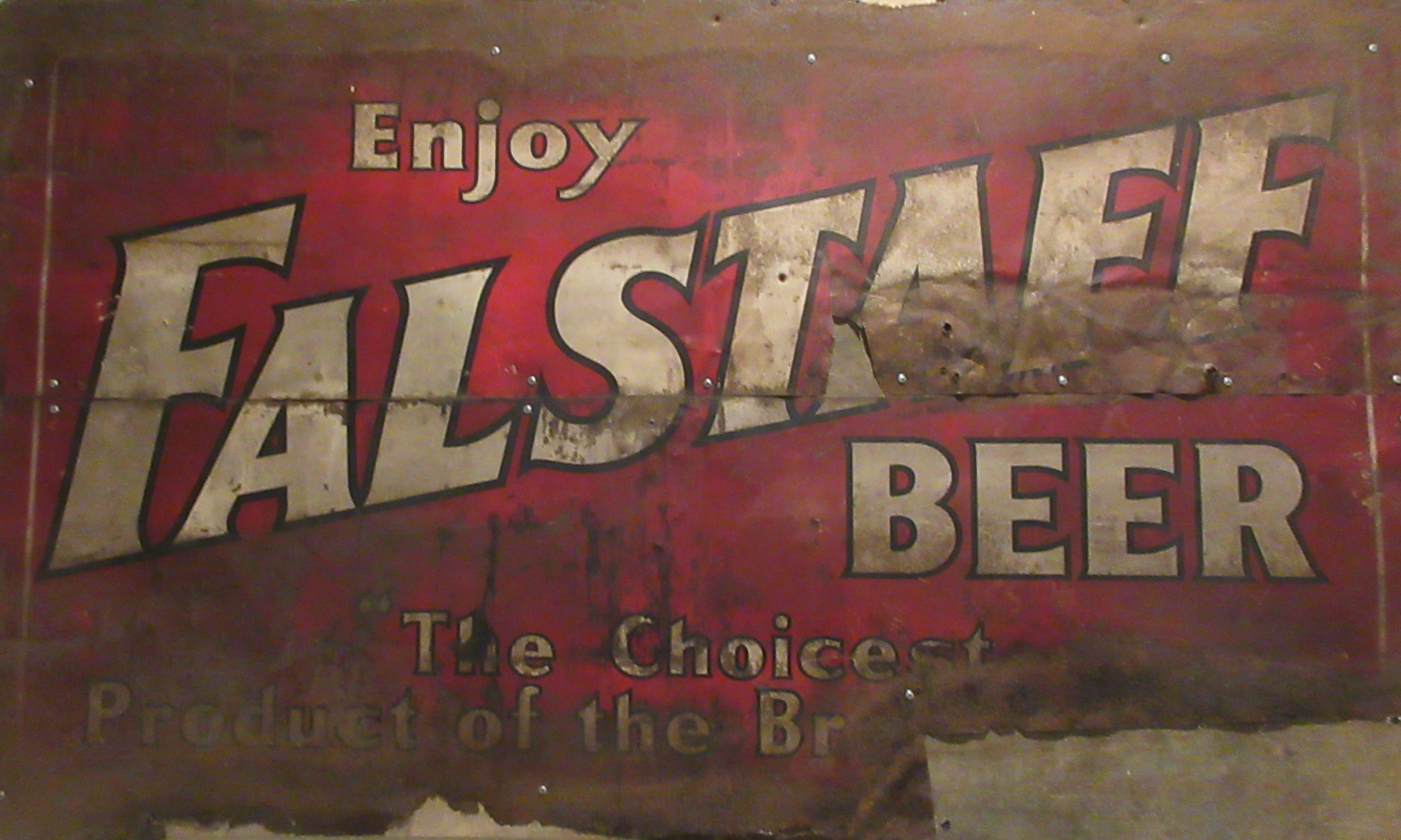
Vintage Falstaff Beer sign

== See also ==
- History of beer
- List of defunct consumer brands
- List of defunct breweries in the United States
