= Hibernia Brewing =

American brewery

Hibernia Brewing Ltd.
- Type: Brewery
- Location: Eau Claire, Wisconsin, USA
- Opened: May 1, 1985
- Closed: August 24, 1988
- Key people: Michael Healy

Hibernia Brewing Ltd. was an American brewery company, the successor firm to the Walter Brewing Company, located in Eau Claire, Wisconsin. Under the leadership of Michael Healy, president and chief stockholder of Hibernia, the brewery introduced several specialty brews considered innovative for their time and became one of the first producers in the American Midwest of what now are considered to be craft beers and ales. At its peak, Hibernia produced over 30,000 barrels of beer per year, employed about 50 workers, and had a market range that included Minneapolis–Saint Paul, St. Louis, Missouri, and Omaha, Nebraska, with success also in Denver and Boulder, Colorado to the west and south; and Chicago, Milwaukee, and suburban Cleveland, Ohio to the east. The brewery quickly earned a reputation for quality products, aided by the receipt of a second place award for its Hibernia Dunkel Weizen in the Great American Beer Festival of 1985. However, the release of underpasteurized beer to new markets was an economic disaster. Although the brewmaster and assistant brewmaster were fired immediately and insurance covered the recall, it was impossible to get the consumer to give them a second chance. This combined with increasing competition from the growing number of companies passing themselves off as brewers, when in fact they were sales/marketing entities that outsourced the manufacturing of their beers.

== Origins ==
The Walter brewing operation was originally established in Eau Claire in 1878 as the Henry Sommermeyer & Co. Dells Brewery, at the corner of Hobart and Elm Streets. It was acquired by Johannes (John) Walter, a German immigrant from the Wuerttemberg area, in 1890. The firm survived most of Prohibition by manufacturing wort (fermenting malt), closing in 1931 before reopening two years later upon repeal. Walter managed to survive the most intense period of consolidation of the American brewing industry, from shortly after World War II through the 1970s, producing nearly 47,000 barrels in 1979 and a high-water mark of nearly 64,000 barrels in 1980.

Changing consumer tastes and very aggressive marketing by stronger national brewers made it impossible for a brewery like Walter, already in basic survival mode, to continue operating. In 1981, Walter's output fell to just over 50,000 barrels, distributed within a sales radius of some 30 miles, and by the end of 1984 its total production had fallen to a paltry 18,000 barrels per year. Brewing activity was down to just one day per week, and only 22 employees, most working part-time, remained on the payroll. Although brewing industry success was predicated upon active marketing, Walter's advertising budget had fallen to zero, and the company's prospects appeared so bleak that a business class at the University of Wisconsin recommended that it be shut down. The operation was within weeks of bankruptcy when Michael Healy, a Chicago businessman, bought the brewery effective May 1, 1985. Although Healy had no previous experience working in the brewing industry, he was a stranger neither to the beverage trade nor to what motivated him to take the company in a new direction. Born and raised on the northwest side of Chicago, Healy tended bar at his father's tavern, Mike Healy's Public House, and while serving in the military in Germany in the mid-1960s, he developed a taste for the more flavorful, fuller-bodied lager beers that dominated there. As Healy noted in 1985 and afterward, “That spoiled me, because when I came home I just couldn’t redevelop a taste for American beer.”

== Changing circumstances and directions ==
The strengths of larger breweries, combined with a flat growth rate in the beer market, played a large role in the demise of Walter. The major national brewers—which used advertising, their economies of size, and an efficient national distribution system—essentially traded the same customers with other national brewers and grew at the expense of smaller breweries, whose dwindling market share ultimately led to bankruptcy and closure in all but a handful of cases. Through expansive and expensive advertising campaigns, the national brewers were able to convince American beer drinkers that what they were offering was what beer was supposed to look and taste like. However, an increasing number of consumers complained of a taste profile bordering on blandness. Unable to spend any money on advertising/promotion, Walter increasingly opted for discount pricing in an effort to sell more beer, joining in the failing footsteps of many small local brewers that attempted to create sales volume with low prices. They found that their products acquired a lasting reputation for lower quality, thereby harming sales still further. At the same time, Walter failed to recognize a critically important change taking place as consumer tastes were moving toward more flavorful, stylistically distinctive brews, demonstrated by the fact that the only true growth in the industry at the time was exhibited by the imported beer segment. As the 1980s progressed, the key to survival for small brewers lay in recognizing and catering to this change in consumer demand, and in turn offering products that the national brewers did not produce and could not make in limited quantities. As Healy noted at the time, “A small brewer cannot compete with the big guys on their terms. We came in with plans to do something different, and everyone welcomed us with open arms.” Unfortunately, under Walter's management, which had continued to try to compete with the national brewers by offering identical-looking, nondescript-tasting adjunct beers, no thought was given to producing all-malt products. The firm made only lager beers, and its entire product mix contained not a single ale.

Before buying Walter, Healy made the choice of being responsible for everything carrying the Hibernia name and not joining the increasing number of contract companies pretending to have their own facilities. Healy felt that full disclosure was the correct way to present his products as Hibernia's and only Hibernia's, under the philosophy that having someone else brew, bottle, can, and keg their beer, but then put their name on the finished product, did not equate to being a brewery. Healy renamed the company Hibernia Brewing Ltd.—Hibernia being the Latin name for Ireland, a nod to his ethnic heritage—and immediately made plans to produce all-malt beers, brews consisting of only hops, yeast, malt, and water and made according to the German beer purity law (Reinheitsgebot) of 1516. Healy believed that there was no reason to drink imported beer when he could import the brewmaster, which is what he did. Armed with the fact that the beverage choices offered to beer drinkers rivaled or surpassed those enjoyed by wine drinkers, and with the knowledge that America could produce world-class brews, Healy introduced excellent, award-winning craft beers. These included the year-round Eau Claire All Malt Lager Beer and the seasonal brews Oktober Fest (fall), Winter Brau, Bock (spring), and Dunkel Weizen (summer), with a plan to release European-style stout, ale, and porter at a later date.

The flagship beer, Eau Claire All Malt, was brewed to a Vienna-style lager recipe and advertised under the slogans “Real Beer Is Here!” and “Real Beer Returns.” Though described in promotional literature as being “a return to John Walter’s original beer of the 1880s,” the formulation was created by Gary Bauer, a Milwaukee homebrewer, under specifications given to him by Healy and with refinement by Hibernia brewmasters. The second beer introduced by Healy in 1985, Dunkel Weizen, represented the first American-brewed dark wheat beer since the advent of Prohibition in 1919. In addition to its specialty beers, Hibernia continued to manufacture several brews from the Walter product line, primarily for the traditional Eau Claire market, including the former flagship Walter's Lager Beer, Walter's Special Beer, and Walter's Light Beer. Although Walter's Lager and Walter's Special had been brewed essentially to the same recipe in the last days of the Walter brewing operation, Healy reformulated the beers upward so that each had its own distinctive formula under Hibernia.

Non-alcoholic beverages also factored into the Hibernia product line over time. Two soft drinks were created in 1985—a root beer and a cream soda—making Hibernia one of the earliest craft brewery producers of carbonated sodas. In 1987, in a further attempt to diversify, the brewery began to bottle carbonated and flavored Eau Claire Spring Water. The water was derived from a farm well near Eau Claire and in independent laboratory testing was found to be particularly pure.

== Early success ==
The newness of the Hibernia specialty beers allowed Healy to penetrate markets and retail outlets that previously had been unavailable to the brewery, drawing interest from distributors in the Twin Cities, Chicago, and St. Louis, among other locations. Draft accounts were particularly receptive to Healy's sales pitch that by taking on the Hibernia seasonal beer line, they would have a different Hibernia beer on tap every three months, or four distinct beers each year—without adding new tap lines—and a corresponding increase in sales that each prompted from both new and returning customers.

The image of superior quality that Healy strove to promote with his beers received a significant start with the results of the 1985 Great American Beer Festival, in which Hibernia Dunkel Weizen took second place overall (out of 104 entries) in the Consumer Preference Poll at the competition—trailing only another new beer at the time, Samuel Adams Boston Lager, a contract brew—and Eau Claire All Malt scored first out of 45 beers in the lager competition. Healy expressed justifiable pride in the accomplishment, noting that “there hasn’t been a commercially brewed dark wheat beer in this country in 65 years. It’s the right idea at the right time. … I think American beer drinkers will discover Americans can make a beer that’s as good as anybody’s in the world if they take the time to do it.”

Subsequent feature articles in various local and regional newspapers, including the Chicago Tribune, brought Hibernia still more valuable publicity and widespread name recognition. The increasing news media coverage augmented extensive personal efforts by Healy to promote the Hibernia product line, including frequent guest spots on local radio and television programs as far away as Madison, Wisconsin; Omaha, Nebraska; and Columbus, Ohio. For appearances at bars and restaurants where Hibernia beers were sold and personal meetings with brewery visitors, Healy took time away from work to welcome guests, invite them to tour the plant, and answer questions about the operation. In a further respectful gesture, in early June 1985, Healy took out a full-page advertisement in the local newspaper, the Eau Claire Leader-Telegram, to thank the individuals and organizations that had helped with the transition of the brewery from Walter to Hibernia. The extensive promotional activities and interaction with potential customers meshed well with the entrepreneur's outgoing personality—and corresponding physical presence, at six-foot-five in height and 240 pounds in weight—as well as his prior experience in sales, with the Hibernia name quickly growing in prominence within the brewery's target markets. A sense of personal enjoyment made the heavy workload more palatable to Healy, who stressed that “one thing we decided when we started was that we weren’t going to do this if it wasn’t fun. Well, it may seem strange when you are working 20-hour days, but so far we’re having fun.”

Early results were encouraging: initial demand for Eau Claire All Malt outstripped supply, prompting Healy to declare that “the acceptance has been incredible. It is very gratifying.” By the end of its first summer, Hibernia employment had risen to 30 workers, and sales figures for June through August were 200 percent higher than for the same period a year earlier. Ultimately, Hibernia brewed 26,000 barrels of beer in 1985, a 13 percent increase in output over that registered by Walter in 1984. A total production goal of 30,000 barrels—slightly above break-even—was set for 1986, with a rise to 87,000 barrels foreseen by 1989. Hibernia also was given excellent reviews from Michael Jackson, at the time the foremost expert on the brewing industry and the changes and trends taking place in America and how it was following in the footsteps of a similar evolution in Britain. The outcome justified the initial perspective of Healy that consumers would be willing to pay more for a better beer, under the premise that “we’re on our way into a brewery revolution. The groundswell has already started. We have an age category in this country (28 to 40) that’s very image conscious. If they’re going to drink beer, they want to drink the best beer possible, and if that means paying $2 a bottle, they’ll do it. That’s what I’m banking the future of this company on.”

In addition to opening the brewery up to tours on weekdays, every hour from 10:00 a.m. to 2:00 p.m., in July 1985, Hibernia took a large step forward in its public relations campaign by opening a seasonal beer garden in Eau Claire at the one-acre vacant lot across the street from the brewery. Employing 18 part-time workers and created in the German image of a family recreational space to drink, eat, converse, and listen to live music, it was the first new commercial beer garden in America since Prohibition. From mid-May to early October, Hibernia beers and sodas were served fresh on tap, and local polka and other bands provided regular entertainment for listening and dancing. Civic interests played a role as well: Healy recognized that Eau Claire had few tourist attractions and opening the beer garden would bring people off the highways during the peak travel season to visit town, tour the brewery, and perhaps stay overnight in the city and spend money. Local tavern owners at first vigorously opposed the Hibernia Beer Garden, but after a few weekends they realized that it brought people to a side of town they never would have visited. Area drinking establishments were doing the best business they had done in years. Since the beer garden closed at 11:00 p.m.—with live music ending by 10:00 p.m. in deference to the interests of local residents—patrons often were not ready to go home that early and continued to socialize in bars and restaurants located in the vicinity.

The Hibernia Beer Garden was a priority for Healy so he could grow brewery sales and provide a distinctive outlet for its products. It also generated additional revenue that was earmarked in part toward physical improvement of the brewery facilities. Initially, Healy invested around $300,000 for advertising, building up inventory, constructing the beer garden, and undertaking general improvements to the brewery. Exterior modifications included plastering walls and demolishing an old building, while inside the brewery a more substantial change was the addition of a laboratory for quality control purposes.

The lab became an even more valuable asset when, around the same time, Hibernia began to perform contract brewing as another way to enhance brewery output and decrease excess capacity. Thus, in addition to its own product line, Hibernia produced unique beers and private labels for clients who did not have their own brewing facilities. The primary reasoning behind the measure was basic economics: contract brewing kept the brew kettles going during slack periods, and it utilized cooling rooms that had to cool tanks whether full or empty and took up otherwise empty storage space, all the while generating additional income. Contract brewing was becoming increasingly important to the craft industry as it allowed entry to the industry without the very expensive capital investment in a brewery. The venture was successful for the brewery, and over time Hibernia manufactured a number of specialty beers, including Newman's Albany Amber Beer, Wolf's Classic Beer and Wolf's All Malt Lager Beer, Portland Traditional Lager, Malibrew Premium Lager Beer, Griesedieck Beer (a longtime St. Louis staple brew into the 1950s), and Bünd Beer (for a Minnesota firm whose label used a variation of the design for Old Timer's Lager Beer, a product brewed in Eau Claire by the Walter Brewing Company during the 1970s and 1980s and briefly continued by Hibernia). In each case, the contract brews remained true to Healy's vision of making only adjunct-free all-malt beers, with recipe formulation done by Hibernia brewmasters according to input provided by clients. Hibernia also provided assistance with the potentially complicated process of getting bottle label approval from the federal government.

As Healy settled into Eau Claire and became more familiar with the inner workings of the city, especially in the vicinity of the brewery, he was asked to represent the views of local residents who traditionally did not have a strong voice. Both the brewery and Healy's residence were located in the Third District, which was the poorest neighborhood in Eau Claire and included a mix of very low income residents, immigrants whose English language skills were poor or nonexistent, and retired fixed-income citizens. The bylaws of the city of Eau Claire allowed voters to cast their ballots for all members of the city council, not just their respective districts, thus Third District concerns seldom rose to the top of the city's concerns. Healy demonstrated his commitment to Eau Claire and basic fair play with his response to a group of citizens who asked him to represent the Third District in efforts to change the Eau Claire bylaws to require that only a resident of the Third District could represent the area. After citizens commented that they had no one there who was well-known or articulate enough to take on the establishment in debate, Healy agreed to help. A special election was held and the change was made after the majority won by a landslide.

== Decline and closure ==
Within a year of its founding, Hibernia had managed to establish itself among consumers in the Upper Midwest as a brewer of quality beers. The brewery scored three honors in the Twin Cities Reader 10th Anniversary Beer Survey, including first place for Eau Claire All Malt in the Super Premium category, fifth place for Hibernia Dunkel Weizen in the Super Premium Dark competition, and ninth place for Hibernia Bock among Specialty Beers, Import and Domestic. Yet the success that Healy and other established small brewers increasingly demonstrated also had the net effect of enticing new brewers into the field, as the blossoming microbrewing movement began to take root in the region by the mid-1980s. As retail shelf space increasingly grew harder to acquire, and hold, Hibernia craft beer sales were challenged by a growing range of competing brews, including those from like-minded old-line brewers such as the August Schell Brewing Company (New Ulm, Minnesota) and recent arrivals including the Sprecher Brewing Company (Milwaukee) and the Capital Brewery (Middleton, Wisconsin).

Distribution issues also proved a challenge for Hibernia in its efforts to stabilize and gain market acceptance. In rural areas and smaller cities, the higher price for Hibernia specialty made it hard to generate sales among clientele more accustomed to cheaper beer, including the home market of Eau Claire. In big cities, established distributors, accustomed to working with larger brewers with much bigger advertising budgets, were loath to take on new products without an established track record of success. With craft brewing still in its infancy, large regional and national brewers successfully used the leverage they had to persuade dealers to stay the course, at the expense of smaller producers with innovative brews. Healy summarized the dilemma that he faced in noting that “you can’t compete directly against the big guys, with all their advertising muscle and volume-buying discounts.”

Despite such obstacles, over time Hibernia production improved to around 32,000 barrels and the future of the brewery seemed more secure than had been the case for almost a decade. The company had returned to modest profitability, new markets were cultivated, and employment had risen to some 35 permanent workers, with 50 at work during the busy summer season. In May 1986, Healy took an optimistic approach to the challenges that Hibernia faced, noting that “although the growth has not been spectacular, it has been very steady, and that tells me I’m getting repeat business, which is the key to the whole thing.” Yet dark clouds remained on the horizon. While contract brewing had aided the Hibernia bottom line considerably, periodic difficulties arose in the area as well, including the loss of production for the Vienna Brewing Company in June 1986 to the Joseph Huber Brewing Company (Monroe, Wisconsin) and an open controversy over Hibernia manufacture of Treaty Beer, for resort owners and vacation business groups opposed to recognition of off-reservation harvest rights (including spearfishing) held by Native American Ojibwe in Wisconsin. When Hibernia ceased brewing Treaty Beer, the group responded by accusing the brewery of withholding royalties, proven later to be false. Much more significantly, calamity blindsided the company in late 1986 when a $100,000 shipment of underpasteurized beer was released to new markets in Ohio and California. Although the brewmaster, John Walter, and assistant brewmaster, Jake Walter, were fired immediately, and insurance covered the recall of the bad beer, the damage done to consumer confidence was insurmountable. Healy attempted to mitigate the damage by meeting with distributors and apologizing via newspaper advertisements.

In September 1987, a new brewmaster, Munich native Fred Scheer, was hired away from Capital, bringing with him a wealth of brewing experience from two continents. But irreparable damage to the Hibernia name had been done in the important new sales territories, with the further consequence that word-of-mouth publicity in established markets took a toll on brewery goodwill and, ultimately, production volume. Additionally, after the initial surge of interest in 1985, Hibernia craft brew sales began to slide in the home market, and retail accounts in and around Eau Claire were not able to take up the slack from declining business elsewhere. The issue was noted by Healy in early 1988 with the frank assessment that “there weren’t any sales. People in Eau Claire wouldn’t support it. The worst mistake I ever made was trying to sell the beer in rural areas.”

As production dwindled and layoffs took place when the company downsized, Hibernia filed for Chapter 7 bankruptcy protections in February 1988. Good publicity was generated in June by the receipt of a silver medal for Hibernia Master Brew, in the European Amber category, in the 1988 Great American Beer Festival. An ambitious plan to build restaurants with miniature breweries—essentially a chain brewpub operation—in partnership with a Schaumburg, Illinois-based firm, and in which Hibernia possessed “the expertise and none of the capital,” failed to materialize, and on August 24 the brewery closed, ostensibly for a short time, because it lacked truck insurance coverage. By early September, Scheer had left for new employment, reluctantly leaving Hibernia for stable work in Michigan at the Frankenmuth Brewery, and the First Wisconsin National Bank of Eau Claire sought to sell Hibernia, with a stated preference for doing so to someone with the intention of keeping the facility open for production. What beer remained in the brewery tanks was kept refrigerated under orders of the U.S. Bankruptcy Court, under the premise that it added value to the dormant brewery. In fact, it was the last brew that the century-old facility ever would manufacture.

== Aftermath and legacy ==
Although four bidders submitted offers to acquire Hibernia before the end of 1988, none realized their goal; two bids were too low and the other two could not secure financing. By spring 1989, only one group remained viable: a consortium of Minneapolis and Madison investors that sought to acquire the brewery, restore the original name of the Walter Brewing Company, and return production to the facility within two months of the purchase date. Although a purchase offer of around $550,000 was made by the group, and the sale was deemed “likely” by Madison media, in the end the deal was not consummated due to an inability to secure financing. In October 1989, the assets of the brewery—land, buildings, equipment, and beer brands—were put up for sale at public auction. In just five minutes of bidding, the entire package was acquired by a dairy equipment liquidation business. But the transaction hit a roadblock in November and ultimately was held up for some six months because soil tests after the auction found a gas leak on brewery property. Most of the brewery equipment was disposed of in subsequent years, for use in dairy production elsewhere, and otherwise sold as scrap for pennies on the dollar.

In August 1990, remaining brewery property and other assets changed hands once again, acquired by Edward Miller and Cynthia Ancil. They reopened the Hibernia Beer Garden and reintroduced Walter's Beer under its original formulation, brewed under contract by the Huber Brewing Company in Monroe and sold at local outlets in Eau Claire. With brewing no longer a viable option at the former Hibernia plant, in January 1994, Miller and Ancil put the buildings up for sale yet again. Only the real estate was made available since all remaining equipment had been removed from the facility by then. Largely unused for the next decade, the structures quickly deteriorated because of the harsh Wisconsin weather and a lack of maintenance. With some areas of the complex becoming a safety hazard, roofs leaking and collapsing, and no prospect for renovation and productive use on the horizon, most of the Walter/Hibernia brewery structures were razed in late 2005, the lone surviving building being a small bottle shop dating to 1906. The rest of the lot remained undeveloped in the years afterward. During the 1990s, the Hibernia Beer Garden closed again, this time permanently, becoming a park for city residents. The Hibernia beer brands, including Eau Claire All Malt, were not picked up by any other brewer.
