= Cragwold =

Historic house in Missouri, United States

- U.S. National Register of Historic Places
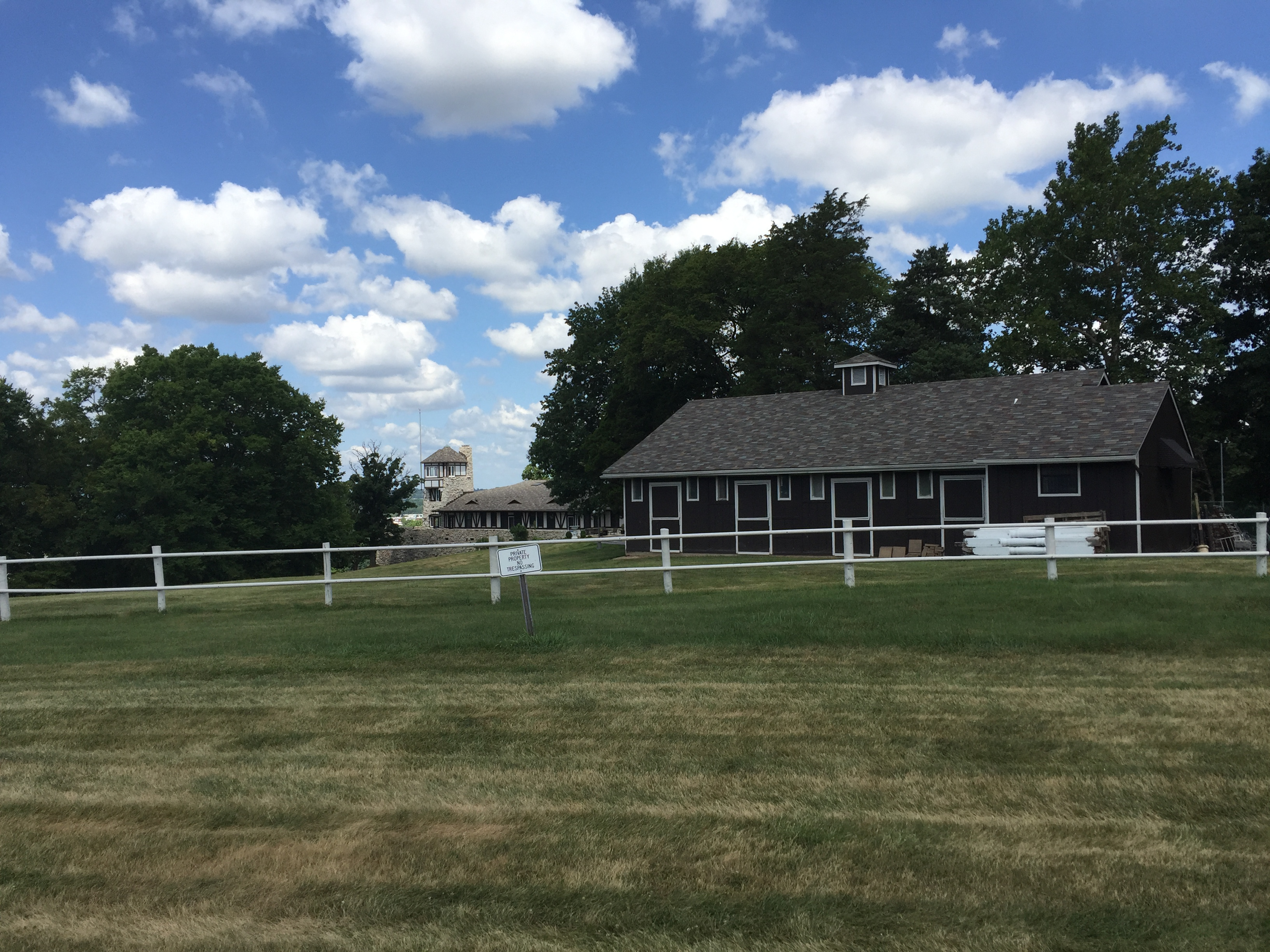
- Cragwold in 2017

- Location within Missouri
- Location: 1455 Cragwold Rd., Kirkwood, Missouri
- Coordinates: 38°33′20.41″N 90°26′15.56″W
- Area: 103 acres (42 ha)
- NRHP reference No.: 09001175
- Added to NRHP: December 30, 2009

Cragwold, also known as Edwin A. Lemp Estate, in St. Louis County, Missouri was built in 1911.

According to the National Park Service:

Built in 1911 for Edwin A. Lemp, Cragwold is one of four estates built near the Meramec River between 1910 and 1920 by wealthy St. Louisans with ties to German-American and brewing families. The centerpiece of the Cragwold estate is the Lemp Residence, an approximately 11,000-square-foot home, built embracing the ideals of the Arts and Crafts movement. The design of the house and character of the estate grounds reflected Lemp's love of nature and passion for exotic animals. The house was designed around a large center atrium filled with tropical plants and several species of exotic birds. By the 1920s, the estate grounds became home to more exotic birds, and ungulates (hoofed mammals) from many continents. Lemp operated the estate as an exotic animal farm and was licensed as a Federal Game Farm.

The property was listed on the U.S. National Register of Historic Places on December 30, 2009. The listing was announced as the featured listing in the National Park Service's weekly list of January 8, 2010.

The Lemp Residence is privately owned and is bordered by Emmenegger Nature Park.

== See also ==
- Alswel: the country estate house of William J Lemp Jr. (brother)
- Lemp Mansion
