= Lemp Mansion =

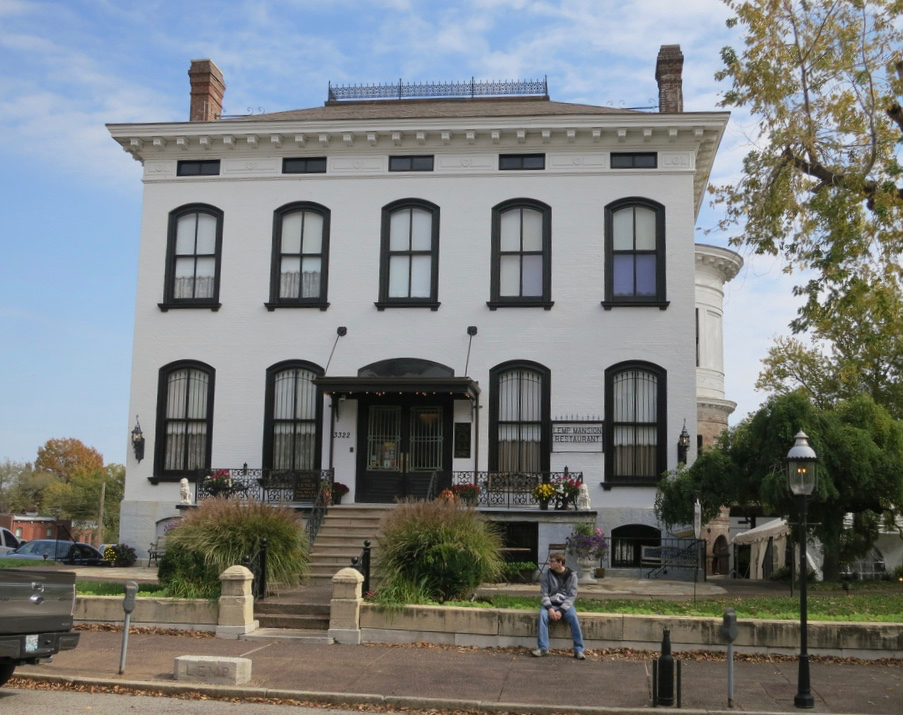
- Front of the Lemp Mansion

General information
- Location: 3322 DeMenil Place (formerly 3322 South 13th Street), St. Louis, Missouri, United States
- Coordinates: 38.5932°N 90.216°W
- Completed: 1868

Website
- lempmansion.com

The Lemp Mansion (3322 DeMenil Place, St. Louis, Missouri) is a historical house in Benton Park, St. Louis, Missouri. The site is recognized for three suicides carried out by individuals of the Lemp family. The William J. Lemp Brewing Co., was a dominant force in the United States beer market prior to Prohibition, particularly recognized for its Falstaff beer brand. It is reported that the mansion is haunted by the spirits of the Lemp family members. The Lemp Mansion has been transformed into a restaurant and additionally provides over night lodging.

== Architectural history ==
The house was built in 1890. In 1911, the house underwent major renovations including conversion of some space into offices for the Lemp Brewery, which then ceased all production when it was sold to International Shoe Company at auction in 1922. The Lemps lived in the house until 1949 when Charles Lemp died by suicide in his bed.

In 1950, the mansion became a boarding house; throughout the next decade, it lost much of its ornate charm. The construction of Interstate 55 during the 1960s led to the destruction of much of the grounds and one of the carriage houses.

Although many of the original details of the home have been replaced, there are still some remaining pieces. The decorative iron gates from the open-air elevator can be viewed from the basement restaurant. In the office where William Lemp, Jr. died by suicide, there is still an Italian marble mantel. The ceiling in the parlor is hand-painted, and the mantels are intricately carved African mahogany. The main bathroom includes a glass-enclosed shower that Lemp brought back to St. Louis from an Italian hotel. The three vaults where the Lemps stored their art pieces are located in the rear of the home. The Lemp Mansion has been transformed into a restaurant and additionally provides overnight lodging.

== Lemp family history ==
=== Adam Lemp and the Western Brewery ===
The patriarch of the Lemp family was Johann "Adam" Lemp, born in 1798 in Grüningen (Pohlheim), Germany. He became a naturalized citizen in November 1841. He arrived in the United States in 1836, eventually settling in St. Louis in 1838. In the St. Louis city directory of 1840–41, he is listed as a grocer.

Adam Lemp started a grocery store at Sixth and Morgan, called A. Lemp & Co., family grocery. This site is now occupied by the middle of the south side of The Dome at America's Center. In addition to typical groceries, Lemp sold his own vinegar and beer. By 1840 he focused solely on the manufacture and sale of beer, forming Western Brewery at 37 South Second Street (about where the south leg of the Arch now stands). Adam Lemp’s beer became very popular due to the increase of German population in the area. Lemp was one of the first in the country to produce German lager, which was a great difference from the English ale and porters. The business prospered, and when a large storage space became necessary, a cave in south St. Louis was used for this purpose as it provided natural refrigeration. The cave was below the eventual locations of the Lemp and Chatillon-DeMenil House and the Lemp Brewery on Cherokee Street.

By the 1860s there were 40 breweries in the St. Louis area taking advantage of the caves along the Mississippi, with the Western Brewery emerging as one of the most successful.

=== William J. Lemp Sr. ===
Adam's son William J. Lemp was born in Germany in 1835. After completing his education at Saint Louis University, he worked at the Western Brewery until he left the company to form a partnership with another brewer. In 1861, he enlisted in the United States Army, and achieved the rank of Orderly Sergeant. On December 3, 1861, he married Julia Feickert. Their daughter Annie Lemp Konta became a writer.

On August 23, 1862, Adam Lemp died, and William returned to the Western Brewery as owner and operator. In 1864 he began building a larger brewery above the caves where Western had been storing its goods. Under William Lemp, the Western Brewery became the largest brewery in St. Louis, and then, the largest outside of New York with a single owner. William began to brew and bottle the beer in the same facility to meet growing demand, a practice that was rare at that time. Further demonstrating his innovation and business sense, in 1878 he installed the first refrigeration machine in an American brewery, and then extended the idea to refrigerated railway cars, in a successful attempt to be the first beer in the United States with a national reach. Soon, Lemp Beer was sold worldwide.

In 1892, the William J. Lemp Brewing Company was founded from the Western Brewery with William as President, his son William Jr. as Vice-President, and his son Louis as Superintendent.

William J. "Billy" Lemp, Jr., was born on August 13, 1867. Like his father, he went to St. Louis University and then studied the art of brewing. However, it was William Sr.'s fourth son, Frederick, born in 1873, whom he hoped to groom to take over the company.

Unknown to William Sr. and his family, Frederick had significant health problems. On December 12, 1901, Frederick died of heart failure due to complication of diseases. William Sr. became despondent and slowly declined. He was dealt another blow on January 1, 1904, when his best friend Frederick Pabst died. On the morning of February 13, 1904, William Lemp died by suicide from a self-inflicted gunshot wound at 10:15 a.m.

=== William J. Lemp, Jr. ===
On November 7, 1904, William J. "Billy" Lemp, Jr., took over the brewing company as president. Billy had married Lillian Handlan five years earlier, and they moved to a new home at 3343 South 13th Street. Lillian Handlan Lemp was, allegedly, nicknamed the “Lavender Lady” for her lavender-colored wardrobe and carriages. She filed for divorce in 1908, charging Billy with desertion, cruel treatment and other indignities. Their divorce proceedings lasted 11 days and ended in Lillian being granted her divorce and custody of William III - their only child - with Billy given only visitation rights.

After the trial, Billy built "Alswel" - his country home overlooking the Meramec River near what later became Sunset Hills, Missouri. By 1914, he lived at Alswel full-time.

The Lemp Brewery suffered in the early 1920s when Prohibition began. The brewery was shut down and the Falstaff trademark was sold to Lemp's friend, "Papa Joe" Griesedieck. The brewery complex was sold at auction to International Shoe Company for $588,000. On December 29, 1922, Billy Lemp shot himself in his office.

=== Elsa Lemp Wright ===
Elsa Lemp Wright, the youngest child of William Sr. married Thomas Wright, president of the More-Jones Brass and Metal Company in 1910. They separated in 1918 and in February, 1919, Elsa filed for divorce. She cited, among other things, damage to her mental and physical health. The divorce was granted after a trial, but Elsa and Thomas soon reconciled and remarried in March 1920. Later that month on March 20, Elsa shot herself while in bed at their house at 13 Hortense Place. Some suspect her death to be a murder masked as a suicide; a feature film exploring this idea, Lemp's Last Wright, previously titled The Case for Elsa Lemp, is in development.

=== William Lemp III ===
In 1939, William J. Lemp III, the only son of Billy Lemp, licensed the Lemp name to Central Breweries of East St. Louis. Central Breweries renamed itself the William J. Lemp Brewing Company and began a grand marketing campaign resulting in increased sales of the new Lemp Beer. The contract was terminated by Ems Brewing, which bought out Lemp in 1945.

=== Charles Lemp ===
Charles Lemp, the third son of William Sr., was the final Lemp to live in the mansion, starting in 1929.

He had left the brewery in 1917, to go into banking and finance. He had also dabbled in politics, influencing many southside wards. He never married and lived with his dog in the mansion with two servants, a married couple.

April 1941, Charles Lemp sent a letter to a south St. Louis funeral home requesting that in case of his death, his remains should be taken by ambulance to the Missouri Crematory. His body should not be bathed, clothed, or changed. His ashes should be put into a wicker box and buried on his farm. There were to be no funeral held or a notice put in the papers.

Eight years later, he shot himself in the head, leaving the following suicide note: "St. Louis Mo/May 10, 1949, In case I am found dead blame it on no one but me. Ch. A. Lemp".

=== Edwin Lemp ===
After Charles' death, the only surviving son of William Sr. was Edwin Lemp. (Louis Lemp, the second oldest son, had died of natural causes in 1931.) Edwin, the youngest son, had worked in the brewery until 1913. He then retired at "Cragwold", the estate he had built overlooking the Meramec River in 1911. "Cragwold", in western Kirkwood, had an observation tower, two servants' houses, and a collection of birds, antelope, sheep, yaks, buffalo and other animals. After his retirement, Edwin dedicated himself to many charitable causes, primarily the St. Louis Zoo.

He donated family portraits and items related to the history of the brewery to the Missouri History Museum in the 1950s.

In 1970, Edwin died at the age of 90. His final order to his caretaker was to destroy his art collection and family heirlooms.

== In popular culture ==
In 2010 the mansion was investigated by The Atlantic Paranormal Society, which was featured on the September 29 episode of Ghost Hunters. In 2023, this mansion was investigated in episode 8 of the series Living for the Dead.

== See also ==
- List of suicides (A–M)
- Cragwold: estate of Edwin Lemp
- Alswel: estate of William J Lemp Jr.
