= Strachan Henshaw Machinery =

Strachan Henshaw Machinery (SHM) were manufactures of paper handling and printing equipment. With a history that spanned over 110 years ending in early 2000. They were based in Speedwell, Bristol, UK and Chicago, Illinois, USA. The Company designed, developed and manufactured products which were sold to more than 60 countries. In 1999, Over 80% of its business came from overseas. SHM manufactured a range of products for book printing, sheet cutting and related ancillary products. Printing Industry Products included the Variquik press for web fed short run book printing, and a range of bespoke web presses for printing medium and long run book, journal and directories in mono or two colours.

In 1999 an administrative receiver was appointed and in 2000 the company went into voluntary liquidation. Some of the products are still available from other companies.
