= Lemp Brewery =

Beer brewing company in St. Louis, Missouri

Coordinates: 38°35′28″N 90°13′3″W

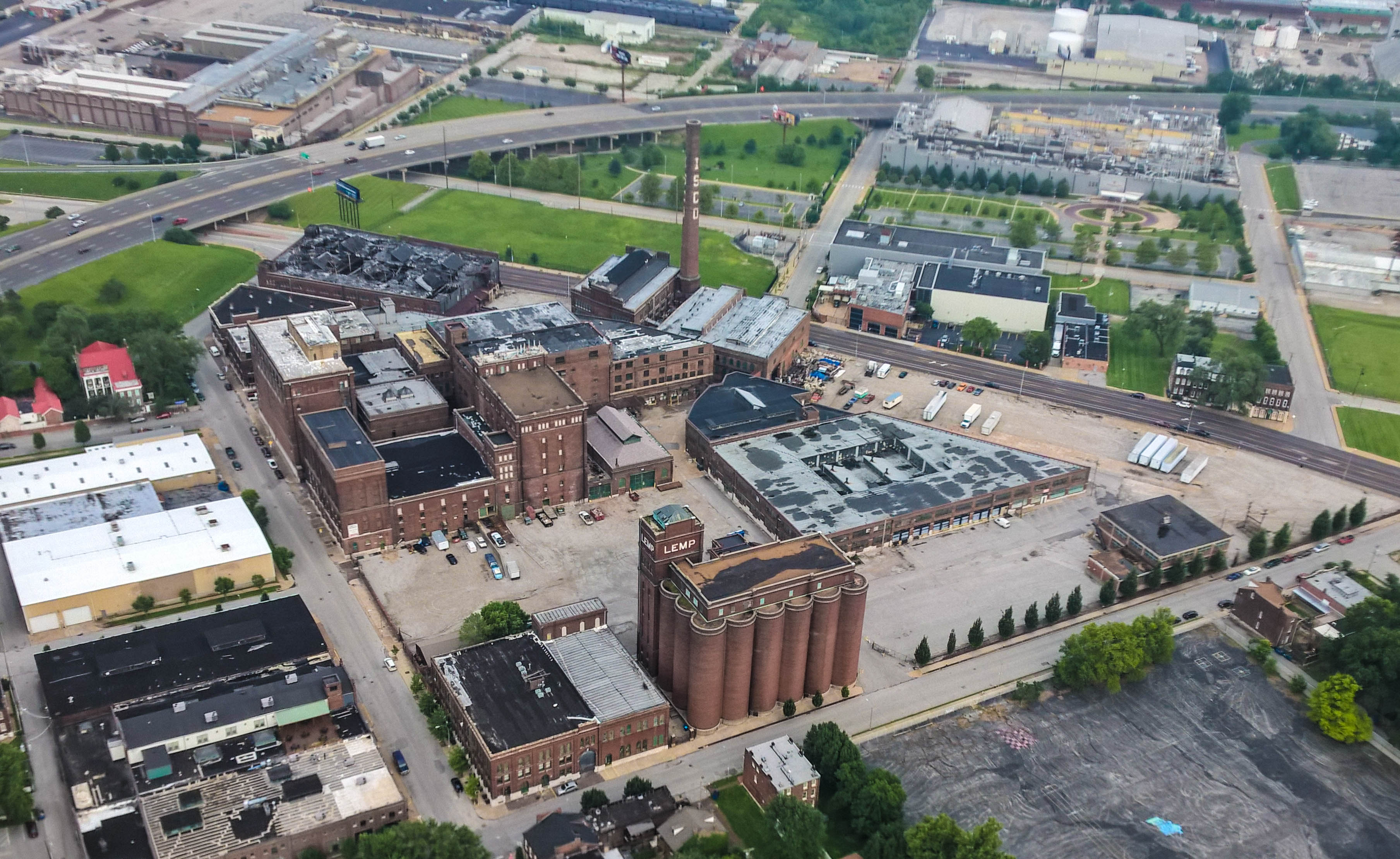
- Aerial view of the Lemp Brewery
- Type: Private
- Industry: Alcoholic beverage
- Founded: St. Louis, Missouri (1840)
- Founder: Adam Lemp
- Defunct: 1920
- Successor: Falstaff Brewing Corporation
- Products: Beer

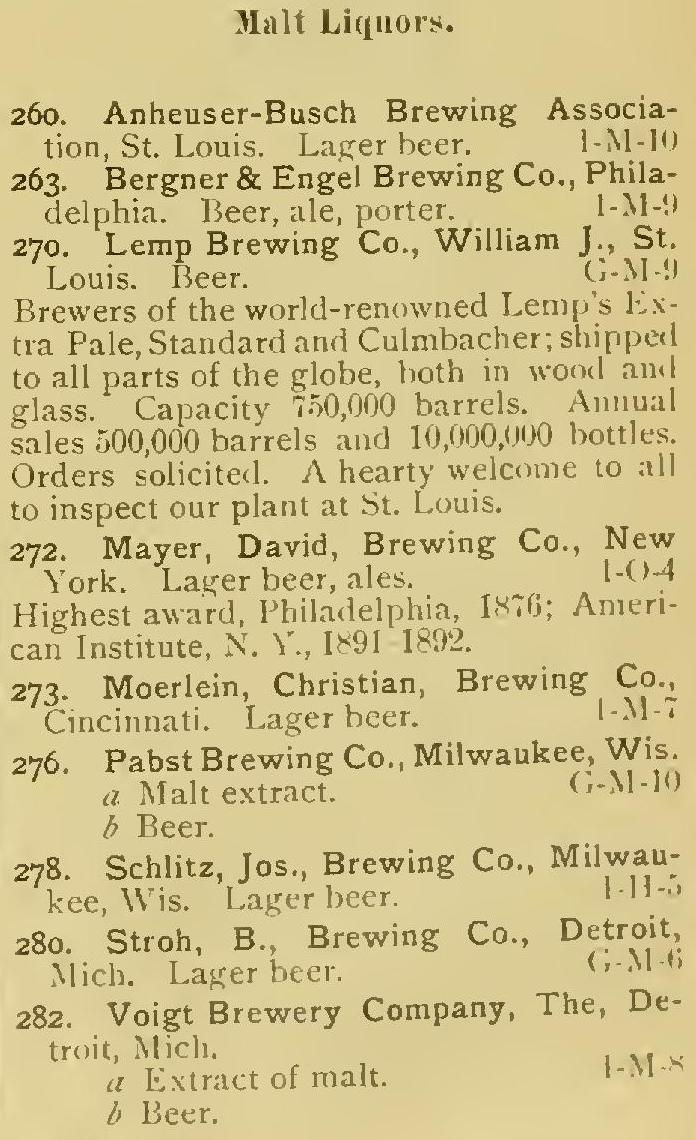
American breweries with exhibits at the World's Columbian Exposition of 1893

The Lemp Brewery was a beer brewing company established in 1840 in St. Louis, Missouri. It was acquired in 1920 by the Griesedieck Beverage Company, which later became the Falstaff Brewing Corporation. The brewery complex consists of 27 buildings on a 13.7-acre (0.055 km^{2}) site in the Marine Villa neighborhood. The Lemp Brewing Company trademark has been owned since 1988 by St. Louisian Steve DeBellis.

== Company history ==
Johann Adam Lemp was born in 1798 in Eschwege, Germany, and two years after his arrival in the United States in 1836, he moved to St. Louis. He sought to make his fortune by becoming a grocer, but abandoned this dream when he realized his grocery store was more popular for its lager beer than for its groceries. In 1840, Adam Lemp closed his grocery and opened a brewery and saloon, then known as the Western Brewery. During the 1840s, Lemp moved the brewery to a larger complex in south St. Louis and began training his son, William J. Lemp, to take over the operations. The elder Lemp died in 1862, with his estate being valued at $20,000.

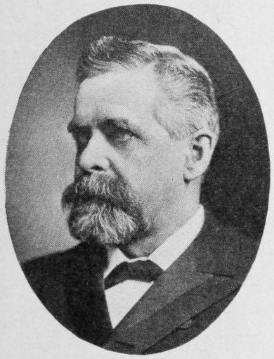
William J. Lemp

William Lemp took over the brewery; in 1863, he purchased the property that would become the Lemp Brewery complex. This property at 3500 Lemp Avenue, still stands. Lemp was the first American brewer to take advantage of the country's growing rail network to transport its product; it built spurs from railroads' main lines and started its own railroad to ship beer. Rail transport turned lager into the country's dominant beer style since it best withstood being shipped, and, because it enabled brewers to transport beer more than 20 mi (32 km) from where it was made, led to the rise of regional and eventually national brands.

After the implementation of Prohibition in the United States in 1919, the Lemp Brewery was unable to continue its beer brewing operations, and its near beer product (known as Cerva) was not profitable. In 1920, the Lemp Brewery's factory complex and brands were sold to other beer brewing companies.

== Brewery complex ==
The brewery is built upon a complex of natural caves that were used for the lagering of beer by early German brewers. Caves are naturally cool, which was especially attractive to brewers before the advent of refrigeration. Several breweries were built atop these natural caves, which were altered to suit their purposes. Stone arches and brick ceilings prevented water seepage and uneven cave floors were paved with brick. In addition to being used for the storage and lagering of beer, such naturally cool places were sometimes employed as beer gardens, places for entertainment.

The Lemp Brewery consists of 27 buildings on a 13.7-acre (55,000 m^{2}) pie-shaped site bounded by Cherokee Street on the north, Lemp Avenue on the west, and South Broadway on the southeast. The first brewhouse was constructed in 1865. When it was constructed by the Lemp Family, the Lemp Mansion, included a tunnel through the natural cave system leading to the Lemp Brewery. The Lemp Family would use this tunnel to go to work.

The Lemp Brewery Complex was purchased by International Shoe Company in 1922 and they occupied the complex until approximately 1980. Although most of the buildings originally constructed by the Lemp Brewing Company remain on the property, International Shoe Company had demolished a few buildings and constructed a new building in the southern corner of the property in approximately 1950.

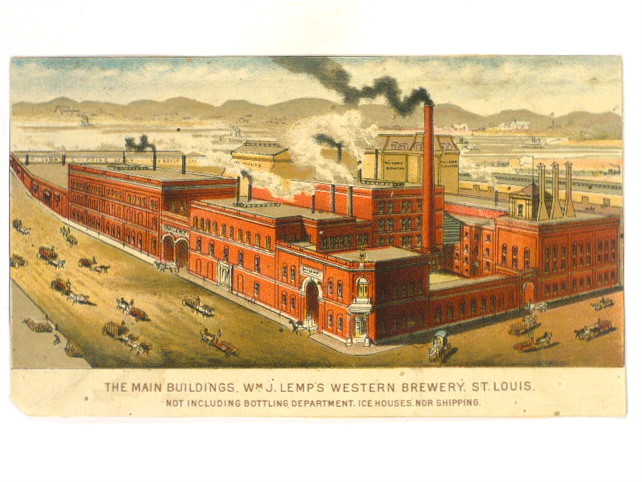
Postcard art of the Lemp Brewery

The Lemp Brewery Complex currently consists of 27 buildings that have been semi-occupied by various tenants for light industrial, commercial, and warehousing uses, office space, and artist studios since approximately 1980. The extensive basements under the buildings were also used for several seasons during the 1990s as a Halloween haunted house and were rented out for rave parties. The main building is now abandoned.

== Revivals ==
In 1939 the struggling Central Brewing Company of East St. Louis Illinois renamed itself as the Wm. J. Lemp Brewing Company. For six years they existed as the Lemp Brewery before changing their name again, to the EMS Brewing Co., in 1945. The brewery would soon close as a branch of Falstaff in 1949. In 1987 St. Louis beer historian Steven J. DeBellis put Lemp beer back on the market as an American adjunct lager. The Lemp Brewing Co. currently contract brews Lemp beer through the Stevens Point Brewery in Stevens Point, Wisconsin.

== See also ==
- Lemp Mansion
- Caves of St. Louis
