= Caves of St. Louis =

Complex of natural caves in Missouri, USA

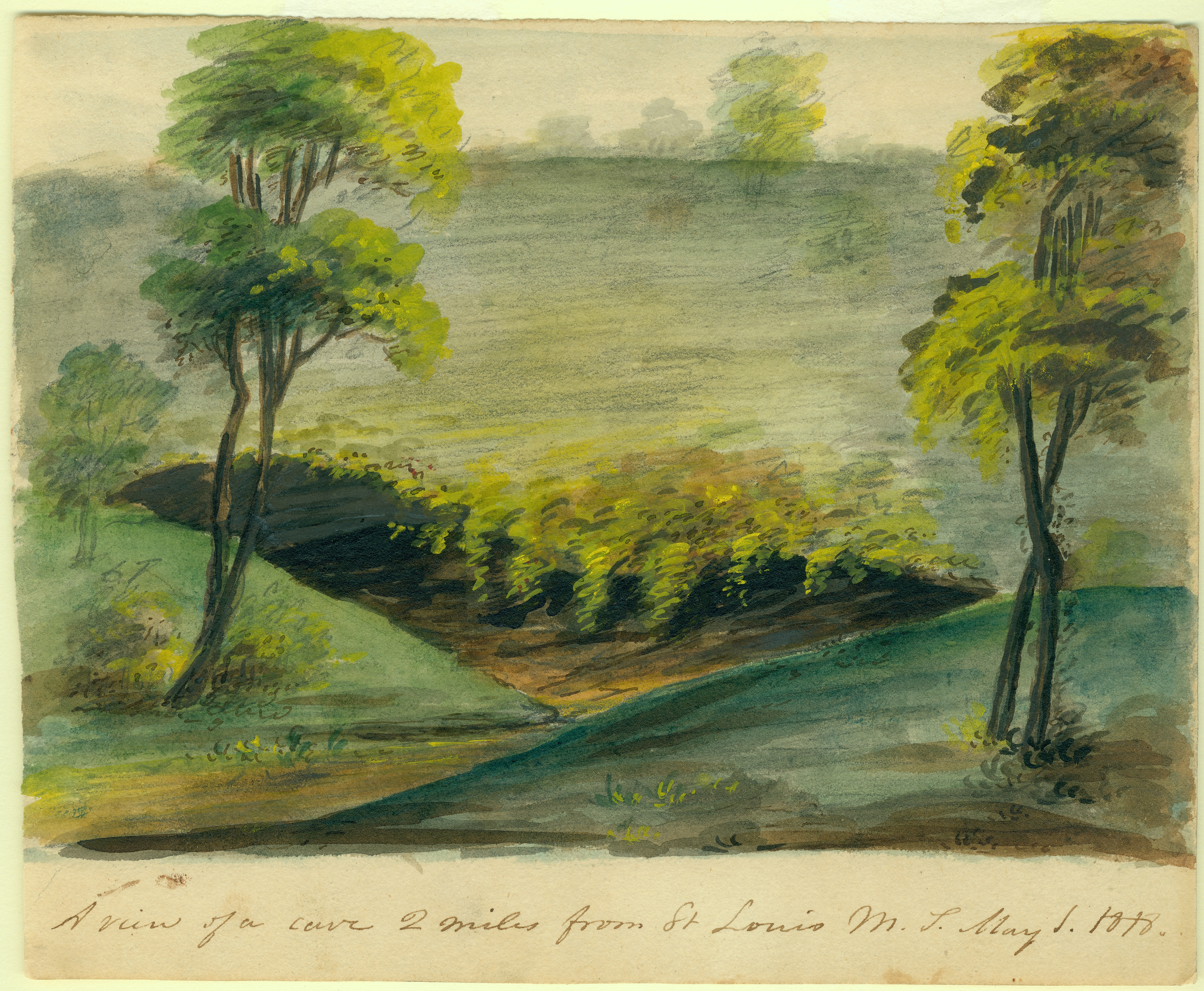
Watercolor painting by Anna Maria von Phul, "A View of a Cave, 2 Miles from St. Louis, Missouri Territory", 1818

The caves of St. Louis have been important in the economic development of St. Louis, Missouri, United States. The city was built upon a complex of natural caves which were once used for the lagering of beer by early German immigrant brewers. Caves are naturally cool, which was especially attractive to brewers before the advent of refrigeration.

== Breweries ==
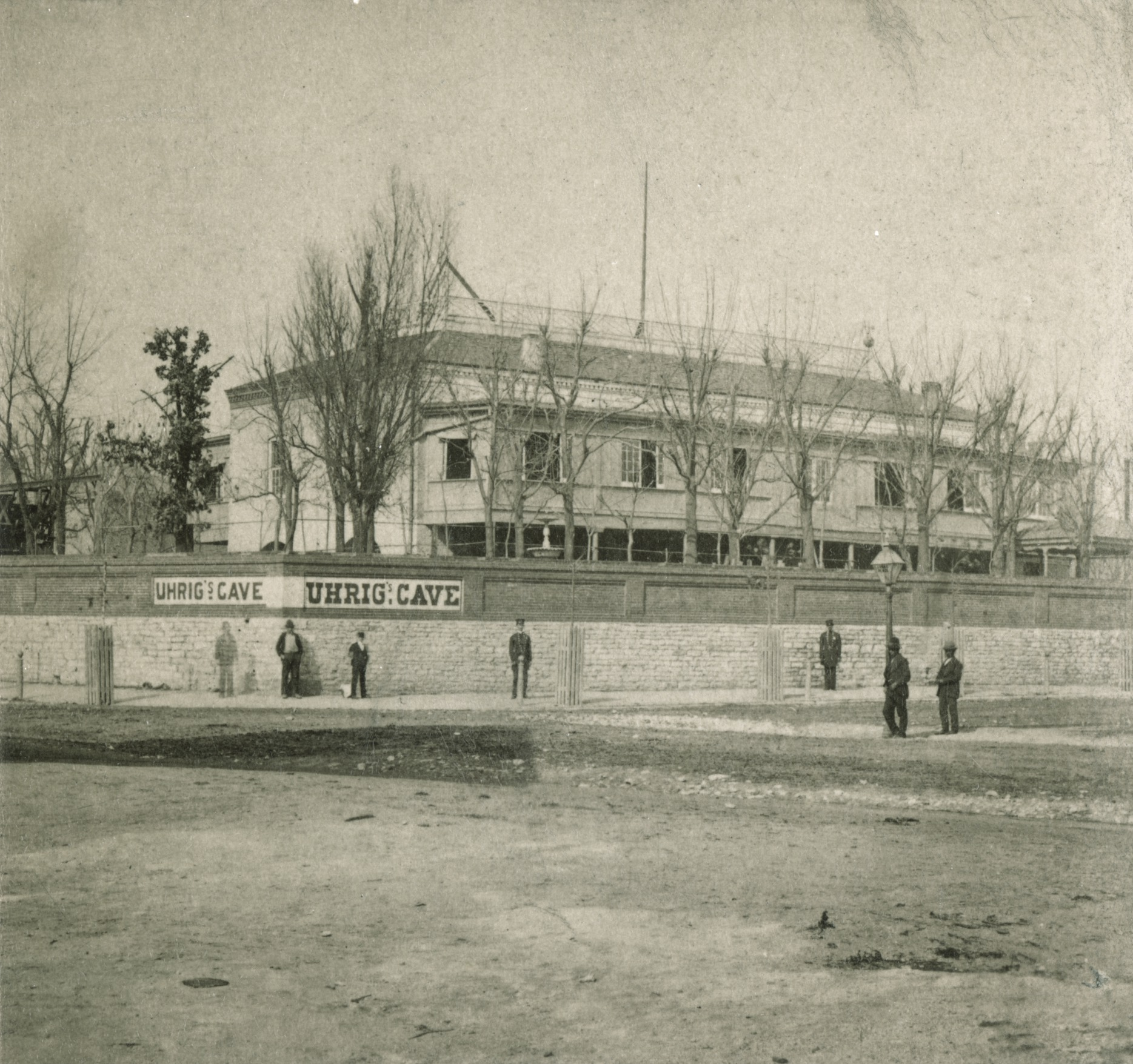
Uhrig's Cave beer garden, ca. 1870

Several breweries were built atop these natural caves, which were altered to suit their purposes. Stone arches and brick ceilings prevented water seepage and uneven cave floors were paved with brick. In addition to being used for the storage and lagering of beer, such naturally cool places were sometimes employed as beer gardens, places for entertainment.

John Adam Lemp, coming to St. Louis from Germany in 1838, started a brewery using natural caves for refrigeration. His son William J. Lemp took over the business and built the Lemp Brewery industrial complex which still stands in St. Louis. The Lemp Mansion was constructed by the Lemp Family and included a tunnel through the natural cave system leading to the Lemp Brewery. The Lemp Family would use this tunnel to go to work.

== Underground Railroad ==
An oral tradition in St. Louis links the cave system with the Underground Railroad. According to this tradition a tunnel behind the house at 3314 Lemp Avenue was used as a secret entrance to the caves. One entrance to the caves opens near the Mississippi River, where the slaves could make their way to freedom.

== Cherokee Caves ==
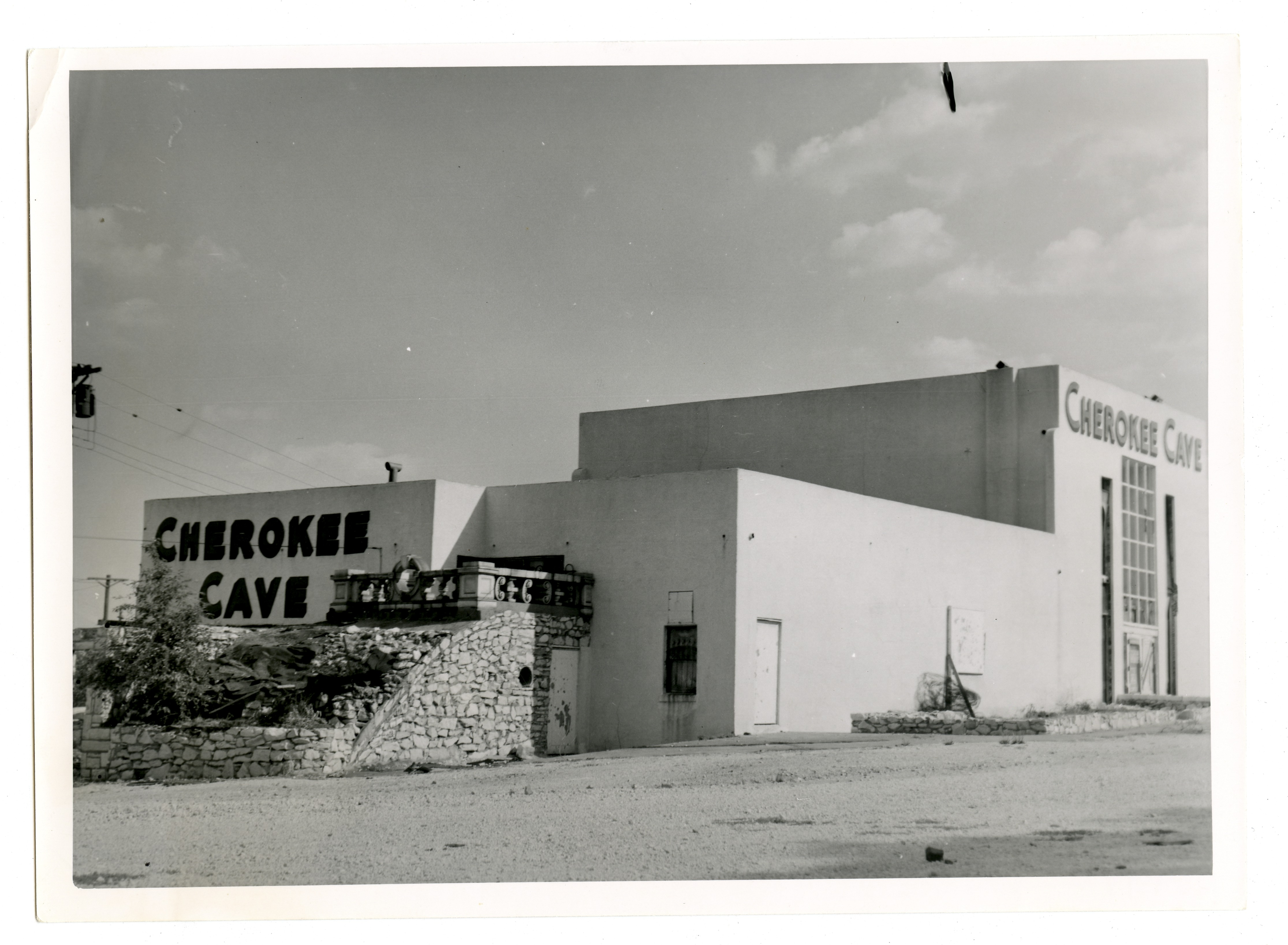
Commercial building for the Cherokee Caves. Photo taken in the 1940-50s.

Cherokee Caves was one attempt to turn the caves near the Lemp Brewery into a commercial attraction. They were closed and the site was demolished to make way for the construction of Interstate 55. In January 2019, the Missouri Speleological Survey printed the History of Lemp Brewery Caverns and Cherokee Cave.

== Entrances ==
Old caves were often filled with rubble from the demolished buildings above them. Therefore, there may be many homes and houses currently built above entrances to the old system of caves which have since been filled in with rubble. The Lemp caves or Cherokee caves still exist.

== Bibliography ==
- Rother, Hubert; Rother, Charlotte (1996). The Lost Caves of St. Louis. Virginia Publishing. ISBN 0963144871.
- Bretz, J. Harlen (2012) [1956]. Caves of Missouri. Rolla, MO: State of Missouri Geological Survey and Water Resources. ISBN 978-0988668508.
