= Griesedieck Brothers beer =

Historic beer brewed in St. Louis, Missouri

Griesedieck Brothers Beer
- Location: St. Louis, Missouri, USA
- Opened: 1866

Active beers
Golden Pilsner, Unfiltered Bavarian-Style Wheat
Name	Type

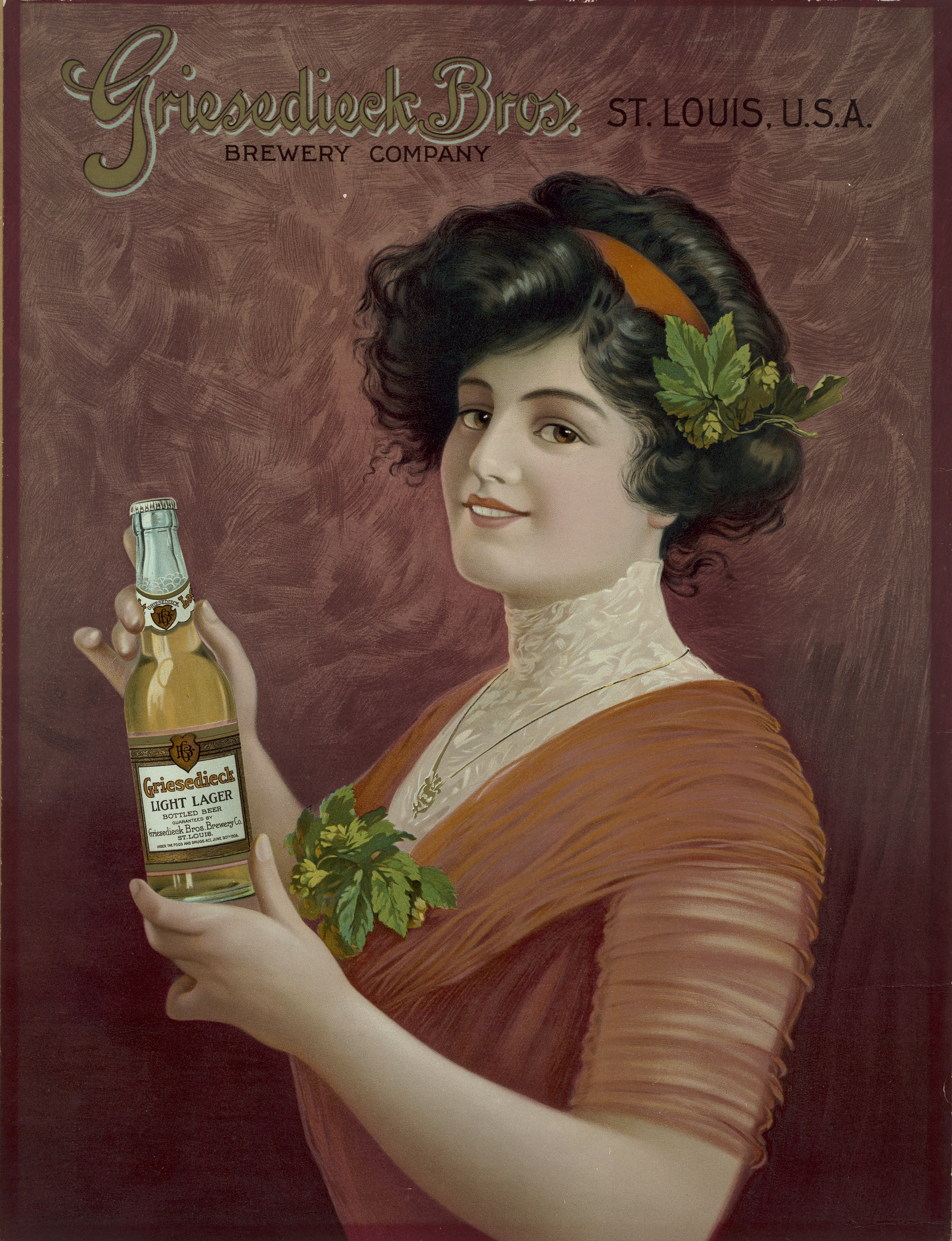
Griesedieck Brothers Brewery Company advertisement, circa 1911

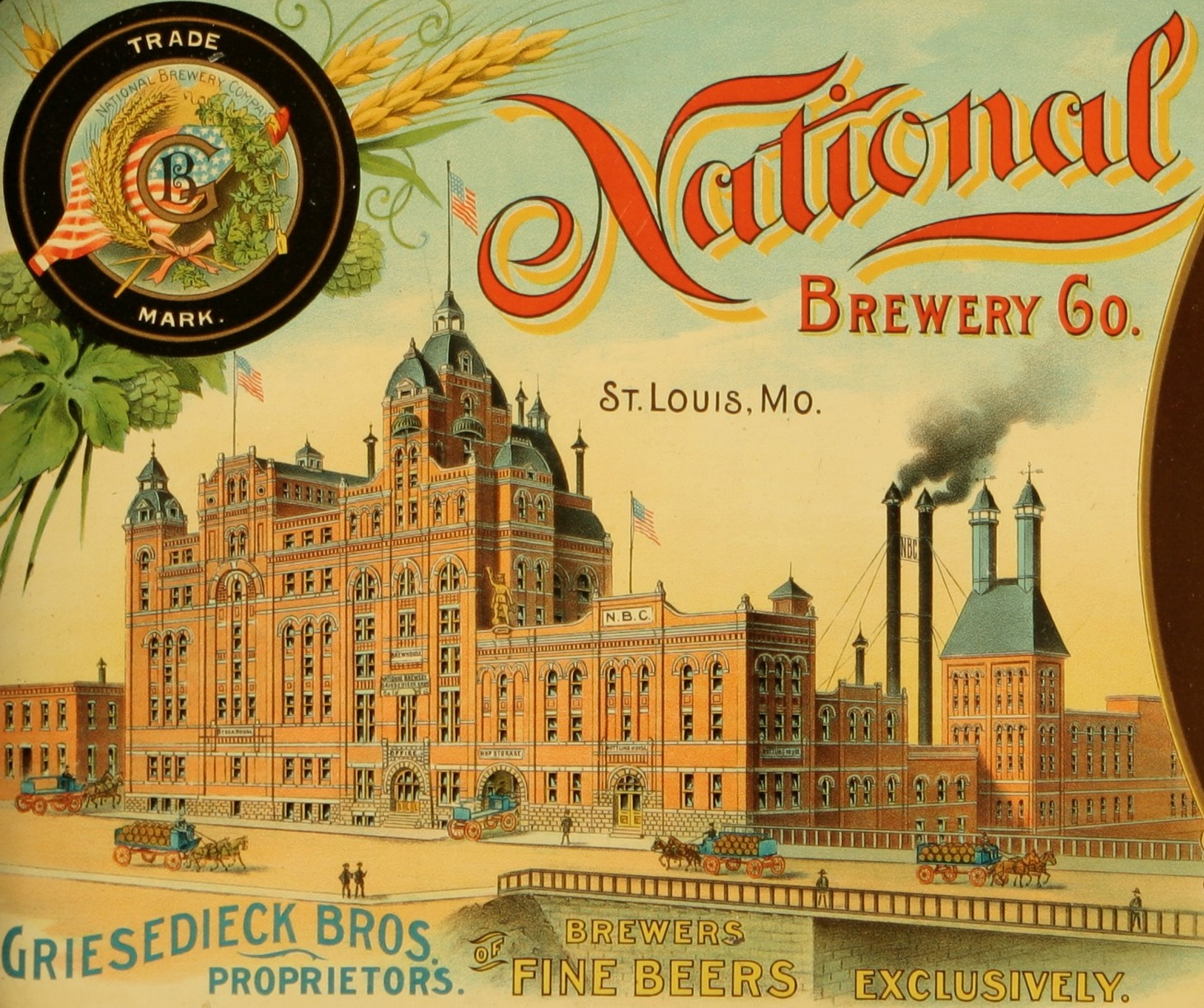
Griesedieck Brothers proprietors, National Brewery Company building art and trade mark, before 1907

Griesedieck Brothers Beer is a historic St. Louis beer brand that has been reintroduced after years of absence. The Griesedieck family once owned three St. Louis-area breweries, Griesedieck Brothers Brewery, Griesedieck Western Brewery Co. in Belleville, Illinois (producers of Stag Beer), and the Falstaff Brewing Corporation, producer of Falstaff Beer.

== Family brewing tradition ==
The Griesedieck family had brewed beer in Germany since 1766. In about 1866, Anton Griesedieck came from Stromberg in the Münster region today's North Rhine-Westphalia to St. Louis, Missouri. In time, he owned a series of breweries, employing his four sons, including Henry Jr. and Joseph "Papa Joe", and nephew Henry L. Griesedieck, who would later found Griesedieck Western Brewery Co. The sons established the National Brewery Co. in 1891, which later became part of the Independent Breweries Company in 1907. Henry Jr. ran IBC for four years until he quit to help his then five sons Anton, Henry, Raymond, Edward and Robert found Griesedieck Brothers Brewery Co. in 1911. GB made non-alcoholic beer and soft drinks during Prohibition but the brewery closed its doors by 1920. For the next 13 years, the Griesedieck Brothers would anxiously bide their time before they could once again brew what would become the most popular beer in St. Louis.

== Post-Prohibition ==
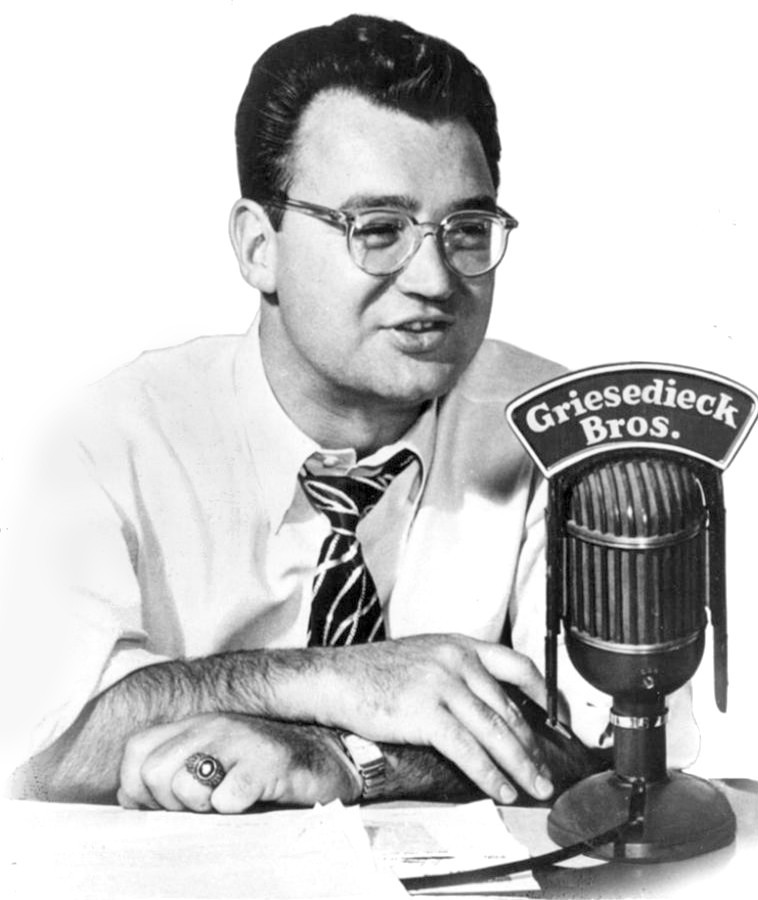
Harry Caray, behind the microphone for a c.1951 radio broadcast sponsored by Griesedieck Brothers

After prohibition ended, the heirs of Henry Jr. kept Griesedieck Brothers while the heirs of Papa Joe ran the Falstaff brand acquired in 1921. Starting in 1947, Griesedieck Brothers sponsored the St. Louis Cardinals radio broadcasts with Harry Caray until the Anheuser-Busch brewery bought the team in 1953. Shortly after Anheuser-Busch bought the team, Sportsman's Park was renamed Busch Stadium, and budget-priced Busch Beer was introduced, which significantly dug into Griesedieck Brothers sales.

When Edward Griesedieck, the last remaining original brother, died in 1955, the company considered its future. In 1957 Griesedieck Brothers was sold to its cousins at Falstaff, and production under the GB name stopped almost overnight. The Griesedieck brewery, at that point, was the most updated in the nation, with production over 1,000,000 barrels per year. Falstaff thus moved all production into the former GB plant.

Falstaff's peak production year was 1966, at 6,000,000 barrels, declining thereafter. When Falstaff got hit with court costs involving the acquisition of Narragansett beer, the company had to sell. Paul Kalmanovitz purchased it in 1975 and moved the headquarters to California. By 1977, the former GB plant was closed down. Through various mergers and acquisitions, Pabst Brewing Company eventually acquired the Falstaff brand but quit production in 2005.

== Today ==
Family descendant Raymond A. Griesedieck, son of Henry A. Griesedieck (the last president of the original Griesedieck Brothers), incorporated the new Griesedieck Brothers Brewery Company in 1992. By 2002, Griesedieck Brothers Beer re-emerged in the St. Louis beer market.

Raymond A. Griesedieck owns the GB shield and Griesedieck Bros. trademarks. Griesedieck Brothers Brewery has provided to various local establishments in the St. Louis area since 2002.

The original Griesedieck Beer was a classic American lager. The current incarnations include Golden Pilsner (a German-style pilsner beer) and Unfiltered Bavarian-Style Wheat (a German-style hefeweizen).
