= Paul Kalmanovitz =

American brewing magnate and real estate investor

Paul Kalmanovitz (1905–1987) was a millionaire brewing and real estate magnate best known for owning all or part of several national breweries and their products, including Falstaff Brewing Company and Pabst Brewing Company. Most of the Kalmanovitz Estate was left to create a charitable foundation for hospitals and universities.

== Biography ==
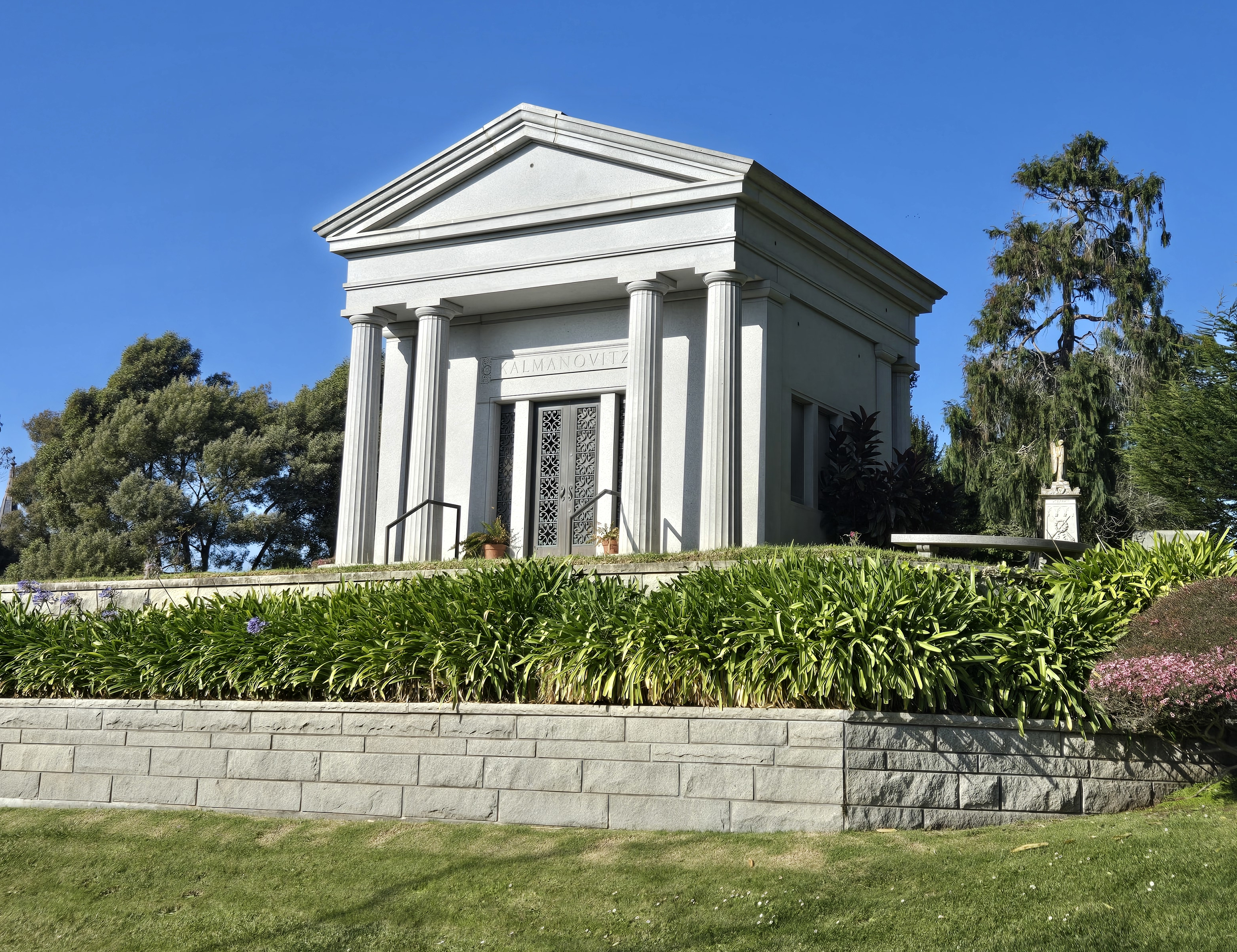
Kalmanovitz mausoleum at Cypress Lawn Memorial Park

Kalmanovitz was born to a Jewish family in Łódź, Poland. While Paul emigrated to Egypt at the end of the World War I, his father, mother, and brothers remained in Lodz. He later worked for Sir Edmund Henry Hynman Allenby. Kalmanowitz arrived in the United States in the 1926 by jumping a merchant marine ship and jumped from job to job, working for several notable people such as Franklin D. Roosevelt, William Randolph Hearst, and Louis B. Mayer (MGM). In 1945, Paul Kalmanovitz received a letter from his niece, Sonia Kalmanowicz, the daughter of his oldest brother Joseph Kalmanowicz. In this letter, she informed Paul that his brother had been murdered in Auschwitz in 1944, but that she and her brother Stanislas had survived Auschwitz. He immediately arranged to apply for a visa number for them to enter the United States. By 1946, Stanislas was granted a visa; by then, Sonia had decided to remain in France. Stanislas departed from Le Havre in April 1946 in steerage on the SS Oregon, a ship of WWI vintage. When Paul entered the US he changed the spelling of the family name from Kalmanowicz to Kalmanovitz. When Stanislav arrived in New York he changed his name to Stanley Kalmanovitz.

Paul was in New York to pick up his nephew and accompany him to his home in Tarzana, California.

In 1950 Kalmanovitz acquired the Maier Brewing Company in Los Angeles, California thus entering the brewing industry. Maier Brewing, makers of Brew 102, struggled for a number of years, and in 1958 faced an effort to be purchased by the Falstaff Brewing Company. Kalmanovitz refused to be bought out, after being threatened by Falstaff to either sell or Falstaff would bury the Maier Brewery. Within a few years Kalmanovitz returned the Maier Brewery to profitability. Along with the brewery and numerous other investments, Kalmanovitz's net worth increased. In 1970 Kalmanovitz purchased Lucky Lager and merged it with Maier Brewing Company to form the General Brewing Company with S&P Corporation as its parent.

By 1974 Falstaff was in need of cash. Falstaff's purchase of the Ballantine brands in 1972 proved to be a mistake and stretched the company's finances. Falstaff sold Kalmanovitz its San Francisco brewery. The cash did not save Falstaff; in 1975 the company was again in trouble. Kalmanovitz offered to inject $20 million into Falstaff for 100,000 shares of preferred stock. On April 28, 1975, Paul Kalmanovitz gained controlling interest in Falstaff Brewing Company. Kalmanovitz more than quadrupled his brewery interests and became a major force on the American beer market.

With the purchase of Falstaff, Kalmanovitz moved the Falstaff headquarters from St. Louis, Missouri to San Francisco to combine it with General Brewing Company's headquarters. By June, more than 175 of Falstaff's corporate employees were laid off. The United States Securities and Exchange Commission (SEC) opened an investigation of the Falstaff purchase, and found it provided shareholders with false and misleading information. Kalmanovitz was prohibited from committing further securities laws violations and Falstaff stock was barred from trading and removed from the New York Stock Exchange. Falstaff appealed all the way to the US Supreme Court and lost. Falstaff workers unhappy with the new direction of the company staged a company lockout, which Kalmanovitz and General Brewing called a strike.

Eventually Falstaff production resumed. Kalmanovitz's plans to make a profit off Falstaff were not to turn the company around and reestablish its brand strength in the market, but rather to cut costs drastically. The biggest change was the advertising budget where Kalmanovitz eliminated all types of marketing. Falstaff's market share continued to slide, resulting in plants closing and employees out of work. Falstaff was profitable for the S&P Corporation, but at a cost to works and the communities around the breweries. Kalmanovitz acquired an ailing brewery, fired the corporate personnel, reduced budgets, sold equipment, stopped plant maintenance, and eliminated product quality control. Kalmanovitz established a standard with Falstaff that was repeated as he purchased Stroh's, National Bohemian, Olympia, Pearl, and Pabst.

Breweries were not Kalmanovitz's only interests; he was involved in helping Guide Dogs for the Blind and several other charitable organizations. Upon his death, Kalmanovitz's net worth was reputed to be in excess of $250 million. A sizable portion of his wealth was donated to numerous California hospitals. His estate also donated funds for the Paul and Lydia Kalmanovitz Library at the University of California, San Francisco, Kalmanovitz Hall at the University of San Francisco, and the Paul and Lydia Kalmanovitz Appellate Courtroom at the University of California, Davis School of Law (King Hall).

Kalmanovitz died at his home in Tiburon, California on January 16, 1987, and was buried at Cypress Lawn Memorial Park in Colma.

== Criticism ==
Kalmanovitz specialized in leveraged buy-outs, which take over businesses to sell off their parts for profit, closing plants and laying off employees. After a takeover in St. Louis, brewery employees flew the American flag at half-staff and upside down.

In 1975, after Kalmanovitz gained control of Falstaff, most of its 175 corporate office employees were laid off. Some of the employee's severance checks bounced. "Kalmanovitz thought nothing of throwing hundreds of brewery workers out onto the streets, cutting off their pension and health benefits … " according to one historian. Forbes magazine wrote that "Kalmanovitz went through Falstaff like Grant through Richmond. ... He took no prisoners."

In a 1979 court case, Bloor v. Falstaff, Kalmanovitz's brewery was fined $1.3 million. The judges described his management style as "Profit Uber Alles".

Personally, he has been described as mean-spirited, controlling and eccentric. He banned telephones from his office and every time he would catch his employees installing a line, he would rip it out.

After his death, a former legal secretary said, his associates toasted him with Jack Daniel's, saying, "Ding dong the king is dead."

Paul Kalmanovitz, whose mother and brothers died in the ghetto of Lodz and the Auschwitz concentration camp, denied he was Jewish until he died. In addition he told all of his associates that he had no family left alive, while to the contrary his nephew, Stanley Kalmanovitz, and his niece Sophie Kalmanovitz (who died in 2015), both of whom survived Auschwitz, were alive during his life.

== Other Kalmanovitz breweries ==
- Lone Star Brewing Company
- Pearl Brewing Company
- Walter Brewing Company, Pueblo, Colorado
