= List of Great American Beer Festival medalists =

Coordinates: 39.7392°N 104.9850°W

Location of the Great American Beer Festival in the United States of America.

This is a list of Great American Beer Festival Medal Winning Breweries. The Great American Beer Festival includes a Judge panel which judges a significant number of Beers, 3,930 in 2012. This Judge panel award Gold, Silver, and Bronze to the top beers in each category according to a GABF style guidelines. These medals are quite coveted as symbols of brewing excellence around the world

== GABF Medal winning breweries ==
=== Numeric ===
- 5 Rabbit Cerveceria
- 10 Barrel Brewing Company
- 21st Amendment Brewery
- 23rd Street Brewery
- 75th Street Brewery Lawerence
- 5280 Roadhouse & Brewery CLOSED

=== A ===
- Aardwolf Brewing Company
- AC Golden Brewing Company
- Acadian Brewing Company
- Aiken Brewing Company
- Alameda Brewing Company CLOSED
- Alcatraz Brewing Company
- The Alchemist
- Allagash Brewing Company
- Alltech's Lexington Brewing Company
- Alaskan Brewing Company
- AleSmith Brewing Company
- Alpine Beer Company
- Altitude Chophouse and Brewery
- Ambier Brewing Company
- American Brewing Company
- Americas Brewing Company/Walter Paytons Roundhouse
- Amherst Brewing Company
- Amicas
- Anchor Brewing Company
- Anderson Valley Brewing Company
- Angelic Brewing Company
- Anheuser-Busch
- Appleton Brewing Company/ Alder Brau
- Arcadia Brewing Company
- Arizona Roadhouse and Brewery
- Aspen Brewing Company
- Atlanta Brewing Company
- Atwater Block Brewing Company
- Auburn Alehouse
- Augsburger Brewing Company
- August Schell Brewing Company
- Augusta Brewing Company
- Austin Beerworks
- Avery Brewing Company

=== B ===
- Back Bay Brewing Company
- Back Forty Beer Company
- Back Street Brewery Vista
- Backcountry Brewery
- Badger Hill Brewing
- Ballast Point Brewing Company
- Baltimore Brewing Company CLOSED
- Bardo Rodeo CLOSED
- Barley Brothers Brewery and Grill
- Barley Brown's Brew Pub
- Barley Island Brewing Company
- Barley's Casino & Brewing Company
- Barrio Brewing Company
- Barton Beers Ltd
- Basil Ts Brew Pub & Italian Grill
- Bastone Brewery
- Bavarian Brewing Company Ltd
- Beachwood BBQ & Brewing
- Bear Republic Brewing Company
- Bear Republic Brewing Company Factory Five
- Bear Republic Brewing Company Healdsburg
- Beartooth Brewing Company
- Beaver St. Brewery
- The Beer Company
- The Bellows Brew Crew
- Bell's Brewery
- Bend Brewing Company
- Bent River Brewing Company
- Berghoff-Huber Brewing Company
- Bethlehem Brew Works
- Bier Brewery
- Big Bear Brewing Company
- Big Buck Brewery Brewery and Steakhouse Auburn Hills
- Big Dog's Brewing Company
- Big Horn Brewing Company
- Big House Brewing Company
- Big River Grille and Brewing TN
- Big River Grille and Brewing (Disney Boardwalk, FL)
- Big Rock Chop House & Brewery
- Big Time Brewing Company
- Bills Tavern and Brewhouse
- Bison Brewing Company
- Bitter End Bistro & Brewery CLOSED
- BJ's Grill & Brewery
- BJ's Restaurant & Brewery Reno & Chandler
- BJ's Restaurant & Brewery Roseville & Portland
- BJ's Restaurant & Brewery Portland
- BJ's Restaurant & Brewery - Boulder
- BJ's Restaurant & Brewery - Chandler
- Black Diamond Brewing Company CLOSED
- Black Forest Brew Haus LLC
- Black Market Brewing Company
- Black Mountain Brewing Company
- Black Tooth Brewing Company
- Blackstone Brewing Company
- Blind Pig Brewing Company CLOSED
- Blind Tiger Brewery & Restaurant
- Blitz-Weinhard Brewing
- Blue Corn Café & Brewery
- Blue Moon Brewing Company
- Blue Mountain Barrel House
- Blue Mountain Brewery
- Blue Point Brewing Company
- Bluegrass Brewing Company
- Bob's House of Brews
- Bohannon Brewing Company
- Bohemian Brewery Company
- Bond Brothers Beer Company
- Boscos Brewing Company
- Bosocos Little Rock Brewing Company
- Boston Beer Company
- Boston Beer Company - Samuel Adams Cincinnati Brewery
- Boston Beer Works
- Bottoms Up Brewing Company
- Boulder Beer Company
- Boulder Brewing Company
- Boulevard Brewing Company
- Boundary Bay Brewing Company
- Bradley's Restaurant
- Brasserie Monx Ltd
- Brasserie Saint James
- Breakers Restaurant & Brewpub CLOSED
- Breakside Brewery
- Breakwater Brewing Company
- Breckenridge Brewery
- The Brew Kettle Production Works
- Brew Moon Enterprises Inc.
- Brew Moon Restaurant & Microbrewery
- Brew Moon South Shore Mall Ventures
- Brewers Alley
- Brewer's Alley Restaurant and Brewery
- Brewery Ommegang
- Brewski Brewing Company
- BrewWorks Restaurant
- Brewzzi
- Brickstone Brewery
- BridgePort Brewing Company CLOSED
- Brimstone Brewing Company
- Bristol Brewing Company
- Broad Ripple Brewing Company
- Broadway Brewing
- Brooklyn Brewery
- The Bruery
- Brugge Brasserie
- Buckbean Brewing Company CLOSED
- The Buckhead Brewery & Grill
- Bull & Bush Brewery
- Bulldog Brewing Company
- Bullfrog Brewery
- Burke-Gilman Brewing Company
- Burnside Brewing Company
- Butte Creek Brewing Company
- Butterfield Brewing Company
- Buzzards Bay Brewing

=== C ===
- Calhoun's Restaurant & Brewing Company of Harrisonburg, VA Closed
- Calhoun's Tennessee Microbrewery
- Cambridge Brewing Company
- The Cambridge House Brewpub
- Capital Brewery Company
- Capitol City Brewing Company Arlington
- Capitol City Brewing Company Capitol Hill
- Captain Lawrence Brewing Company
- Captains City Brewery
- Carolina Brewery
- Carter's Brewing
- Carver Brewing Company
- Cascade Brewery Company LLC
- Cascade Lakes Brewing Company LLC
- Casco Bay Brewing Company
- Castle Springs Brewing Company
- Catamount Brewing Company
- CB & Potts Reataurant & Brewery Denver tec
- CB & Potts Reataurant & Brewery Flaitrons/Westminster
- CB & Potts Reataurant & Brewery - Fort Collins
- CB & Potts Reataurant & Brewery Highlands Ranch
- Celis Brewery Inc.
- Central Waters Brewing Company
- Cervecerias La Cruda
- CH Evans Brewing Company at the Albany Pump Station
- Chama River Brewing Company
- Champion Brewing Company
- Charleville Vineyard & Microbrewery
- Charlie and Jake's Brewery
- Chelsea Brewing Company
- Cherryland Brewing Company
- Chesapeake Bay Brewing Company CLOSED
- Chicago Pizza
- Chicago Brewing Company
- Choc Beer Company
- Chophouse and Brewery Cleveland
- Chuckanut Brewery
- The Church Brew Works
- Cigar City Brewing
- Cisco Brewers
- City Brewing Company
- CJ's Brewery & Grill
- Cleveland Brewing Company
- Clipper City Brewing Company
- Coast Brewing Company
- Coast Range Brewing Company
- Coeur D'Alene Brewing Company
- Colorado Belle
- Colorado Boy Brewing Company
- Colorado Brewery & Trading Company
- Colorado Brewing Company/Draft House
- Columbus Brewing Company
- Columbia River Brewing Company
- The Commons Brewery CLOSED
- Community Beer Company
- Commonwealth Brewing Company
- CooperSmith's Pub and Brewing Company
- Coors Archive Brewery
- Coors Brewing Company
- Copper Kettle Brewing Company
- Copper Tank Brewing Company CLOSED
- Cottonwood Brewery
- Cowboy Restaurant & The Brewery
- Covey Restaurant & Brewery
- Coyote Springs Brewing Company
- Craftsman Brewing Company
- Crested Butte Brewery
- Crooked River Brewing Company
- Crooked Stave Artisan Beer Project
- Custom Brewcrafters Inc.

=== D ===
- Dakota Brewing Company
- Dale Bros. Brewery
- Dark Horse Brewing Company
- DC Brau Brewing Company
- Del Norte Brewing Company CLOSED
- Delafield Brewhaus
- Dells Brewing Company
- Dempsey's Ales House/Sonoma Brewing
- Denver Beer Company
- Deschutes Brewery
- Desert Edge Brewery
- DESTIHL
- Detroit Beer Company
- Devil Mountain Brewery
- Devils Backbone Brewing Company -Basecamp
- Devils Backbone Brewing Company -Outpost
- DG Yuengling & Sons Inc.
- Diamond Bear Brewing Company
- Dillon DAM Brewery
- Dilworth Micro Brewery
- Dixie Brewing Company
- Dock Street Brewery
- DOG Brewing Company
- Dogfish Head Brewery
- Dogwood Brewing Company
- Dornbusch Brewing Company
- Dostal Alley Brewpub & Casino
- Drake's Brewing Company
- Dry Dock Brewing Company
- The Duck-Rabbit Craft Brewery Inc.
- DuClaw Brewing Company
- Durango Brewing Company

=== E ===
- Echo Brewing Company
- Eddyline Brewing
- Eel River Brewing Company
- EJ Phair Brewing Company
- El Toro Brewing Company
- Elevator Brewing Company
- Elk Grove Brewery and Restaurant CLOSED
- Elliott Bay Brewery Pub
- Elysian Brewing Company
- Emmett's Tavern & Brewing Company
- Empire Brewing Company
- Engine House #9 Restaurant & Brewery
- Epic Brewing Company
- Equinox Brewing Company
- Erie Brewing Company
- Eske's Brew Pub & Eatery
- Eskes Park Brewery
- Etna Brewing Company
- Eugene City Brewery CLOSED
- Evansville Brewing Company CLOSED

=== F ===
- Falstaff Brewing Company
- Far West Brewing Company
- Fat Head's Brewery
- Fat Head's Brewery & Saloon
- Fegley's Allentown & Bethlehem Brew Works
- Fegley's Brew Works
- FiftyFifty Brewing Company
- Figueroa Mountain Brewing Company
- Firehouse Grill & Brewery
- Firestone Walker Brewing Company
- Fish Brewing Company
- Fitger's Brewhouse
- Fitzpatrick's
- Flat Branch Pub and Brewery
- Florida Beer Company
- Flossmoor Station Brewing Company
- Flyers Restaurant and Brewery
- Flying Aces Brewing Company
- Flying Dog Brewery
- Flying Fish Brewing Company
- Foothills Brewing
- Former Future Brewing Company
- Fort Collins Brewery
- Fort Hill Brewhouse
- Founders Brewing Company
- Four Peaks Brewing Company
- Fox River Brewing Company Fratellos
- Frankenmuth Brewery Inc.
- Frederick Brewing Company
- Fredericksburg Brewing Company
- Free State Brewing Company
- Fremont Brewing
- Friends Brewing Company
- Full Pint Brewing Company
- Full Sail Brewing Company
- Full Sail Brewing Company Riverplace
- Funkwerks

=== G ===
- G. Heileman Brewing Company
- Gella's Diner and Lb. Brewing Company
- General Lafayette Inn & Brewery
- Ghost River Brewing
- Gilbert Robinson Inc.
- Gilded Otter Brewing Company
- Glacier Brewhouse
- Glassock Brewing Company
- Glenwood Canyon Brewing Company
- Gluek Brewing Company/ Reflo Inc
- Golden City Brewery
- Golden Pacific Brewing Company CLOSED
- Goose Island Beer Company
- Gordon Biersch Brewing Company
- Gordon Biersch Brewery Restaurant TN
- Gordon Biersch Brewery Restaurant Group CO
- Grand Teton Brewing Company
- Gray Brewing Company
- Great Adirondack Brewing Company
- Great American Restaurants
- Great Basin Brewing Company
- Great Dane Pub & Brewing
- Great Divide Brewing Company
- Great Heights Brewing Company
- Great Lakes Brewing Company Ohio
- Green Flash Brewing Company
- Grimm Brothers Brewhouse
- Grumpy Troll Brewery, Restaurant & Pizzeria
- Gunnison Brewery
- Gunwhale Ales

=== H ===
- Hale's Ales Brewery & Pub
- Half Acre Beer Company
- Ham's Restaurant & Brewhouse
- Harmon Restaurant & Brewery
- Harpoon Brewery
- Hart Brewing Inc.
- Harvester Brewing
- Havenhill Brewery
- Haymaker Pub & Brewery
- HC Berger Brewing
- Heartland Brewing Company
- Heavenly Daze Brewery & Grill
- Heileman Brewing Company
- Henry Weinhart's Brewing
- Heretic Brewing Company
- Hereford & Hops Brewpub
- Heritage Brewing Company
- Herkimer Pub and Brewery
- Hibernia Brewing Company
- High Falls Brewing Company
- High Noon Saloon & Brewery
- High Point Brewing Corp
- High Sierra Brewing Company
- Highland Brewing Company
- Hoffbrau Steaks Brewery
- HofbrauHaus Brewery & Biergarten at Station Casino
- Hollister Brewing Company
- Holy City Brewing
- Holy Cow!
- Honolulu Brewing Company
- Hood Canal Brewing Company
- Hook & Ladder Brewing Company
- Hope Brewing Company
- Hoppin' Frog Brewing Company
- Hoppers Brooker Creek Grille & Tap Room
- Hoppers Grill & Brewing Company
- Hoppy Brewing Company
- Hops Bistro and Brewery
- Hops Grillhouse and Brewery
- Hoptown Brewing Company
- Hopworks Urban Brewery
- Houston Brewery CLOSED
- Hub City Brewery
- Hubcap Brewery & Kitchen Dallas
- Hudepohl-Schoenling Brewing Company
- Humboldt Brewery
- Humperdinks Restaurant and Brewery
- Huntington Beach Beer Company

=== I ===
- Idaho Brewing Company
- Idle Spur
- Il Vicino Brewing Company
- Independence Brewing Company Philadelphia PA CLOSED
- Irish Times Pub & Brewery
- Iron Hill Brewery & Restaurant Newark
- Iron Hill Brewery & Restaurant - Lancaster
- Iron Hill Brewery & Restaurant - Media
- Iron Hill Brewery & Restaurant - Phoenixville
- Iron Hill Brewery & Restaurant - Wilmington
- Iron Hill Brewery & Restaurant West Chester
- Iron Springs Pub & Brewery
- Ironworks Pub
- Island Brewing Company
- Issaquah Brewhouse Rogue Ales
- Ithaca Beer Company

=== J ===
- Jack's Abby Brewing
- Jacob Leinenkugel Brewing Company
- James Page Brewing Company
- Jarre Creek Ranch Brewery
- Jaxon's Restaurant & Brewery
- JE Siebel & Sons Company Inc.
- JJ Bitting Brewing Company
- JT Whitneys Pub & Brewery
- John Harvard's Brew House
- Jolly Pumpkin Artisan Ales
- Jones Brewing Company
- Jos Schlitz Brewing Company
- Joseph Huber Brewing Company
- Jump Cafe
- Jupiter Brewpub
- Jurupa Valley Brewing Company

=== K ===
- Kalamazoo Brewing
- Kannah Creek Brewing Company
- Kansas City Bier Company
- Karl Strauss Brewing Company
- Kelmers Brewhouse
- Kern River Brewing
- Kessler Brewing Company
- Kettlehouse Brewing Company
- Kidders Brewpub
- Kohola Brewery
- Kona Brewing Company
- Kuhnhenn Brewing Company

=== L ===
- La Cumbre Brewing Company
- La Conner Brewing Company
- Lake Tahoe Brewing Company CLOSED
- Lakefront Brewery
- Latrobe Brewing Company
- Laughing Dog Brewing
- Laurelwood Brewing Company
- Lawrenceville Brewing Company
- Leavenworth Brewery
- Left Coast Brewery and Cafe
- Left Hand Brewing Company
- Leinenkugel's Ballyard Brewery
- Lexington Avenue Brewery
- Liberty Street Brewing Company
- Lind Brewing Company
- Lindens Brewing Company
- The Lion Brewery
- Little Apple Brewing Company
- Local Color Brewing Company
- Logsdon Farmville Ales
- Lone Star Brewing Company
- Lonerider Brewing Company
- Lonetree Brewing Ltd
- Long Trail Brewing Company
- Long Valley Pub and Brewery
- Los Gatos Brewing Company CLOSED
- The Lost Abbey
- Lost Coast Brewery and Cafe
- Louisiana Jack's
- Lumberyard Brewing Company

=== M ===
- MacTarnahan's Brewing Company CLOSED
- Mad Anthony Brewing Company
- Mad Fox Brewing Company
- Mad River Brewing Company
- Magnolia Gastropub and Brewery
- Main Street Brewery
- Mammoth Brewing
- Marble Brewery
- Marin Brewing Company
- Martha's Exchange
- Mash House Restaurant & Brewing Company
- Maui Brewing Company
- Maui Brewing Company Brewpub
- Max Lager's Wood-Fired Grill & Brewery
- McCoy's Public House and Brewkitchen
- Mcguire's Irish Pub
- McKenzie Brew House
- McKenzie River Partners
- McNeil's Brewery
- Mendocino Brewing Company
- Michelob Brewing Company
- Michigan Brewing Company
- Mickey Finn's Brewery
- Mickey's Brewing Company
- Midnight Sun Brewing Company
- Mile High Brewing Company
- Mill Brewery, Eatery & Bakery
- Miller Brewing Company
- Millstream Brewing Company
- Minneapolis Town Hall Brewery
- Minnesota Brewing
- Minocqua Brewing Company
- Mishawaka Brewing Company
- Mission Brewery
- Montana Brewing Company
- Montgomery Brewing Company
- Moon River Brewing Company
- Moose's Tooth Brewing Company
- Moosejaw Pizza and Brewing
- Morgan Street Brewery
- Mother Earth Brewing Company
- Mountain Sun Pub and Brewery
- Mountain Valley Brew Pub
- Moylan's Brewing Company

=== N ===
- Napa Smith Brewery
- Napa Valley Brewing Company
- Nashville Brewing Company
- Native Brewing Company
- Natty Greene's Brewing Company
- Nebraska Brewing Company
- Nectar Ales
- Neshaminy Creek Brewing Company
- Neuweiler Brewing Company Inc.
- New Belgium Brewing Company
- New England Brewing Company
- New Glarus Brewing Company
- New Holland Brewing Company
- New Mexico Brewers Guild
- New Planet Beer Company
- New River Brewing Company
- New Road Brew House
- New South Brewing
- Newport Beach Brewing Company
- Ninkasi Brewing Company
- NoDa Brewing Company
- Nodding Head Brewing Company
- No-Li Brewhouse
- North by Northwest
- North Coast Brewing Company Inc.
- North East Brewing Company Inc.
- The Northampton Brewery
- Northwoods Brewing Corporation

=== O ===
- O'Fallon Brewery
- O'Ryans Tavern and Brewery
- Oak Creek Brewing Company
- Oaken Barrel Brewing Company
- Oakshire Brewing
- Oasis Brewery
- Oasis Brewery Annex
- Oasis Brewery and Restaurant
- Odell Brewing Company
- Offshore Ale Company
- Oggi's Pizza Brewing Company
- Old Dominion Brewing Company
- Old Marlborough Brewing Company
- Old New York Brewing Company
- The Olde Mecklenburg Brewery
- Olde Peninsula Brewpub & Restaurant
- Olde Saratoga Brewing Company
- Oldenberg Brewery/Drawbridge
- Oliver Breweries Ltd
- On Tap Bistro & Brewery
- Opa-Opa Brewing Company
- Oregon Ale and Beer Company CLOSED
- Oregon Trail Brewery
- Oskar Blues Brewery
- Otter Creek Brewing/Wolaver's Organic Ales
- Otto Brothers Brewing Company
- Outer Banks Brewing Company
- Overland Stage Stop Brewery
- The Oyster Bar Bistro & Brewery

=== P ===
- Pabst Brewing Company
- Pacific Beach Brewhouse
- Pacific Brewing
- Pacific Coast Brewing Company CLOSED
- Pagosa Brewing Company
- Papago Brewing Company CLOSED
- Park Slope Brewing Company
- Pearl Brewing Company
- Pelican Pub & Brewery
- Pennsylvania Brewing Company
- Perennial Artisan Ales
- Pete's Brewing Company
- Pete's Place
- Peticolas Brewing Company
- PH Woods Restaurant & Brewery
- Phantom Canyon Brewing
- Piece Brewery
- Pig's Eye Brewing Company
- Pike Brewing Company
- Pittsburgh Brewing Company
- Pizza Port Carlsbad
- Pizza Port Ocean Beach
- Pizza Port San Clemente
- Pizza Port Solona Beach
- Plank Road Brewery
- Pony Express Brewing Company
- Port Brewing Company
- Port Brewing & The Lost Abbey
- Portland Brewing Company
- Portsmouth Brewery
- Port City Brewing Company
- Powerhouse Restaurant & Brewery
- Prescott Brewing Company
- The Prodigal Brewery
- The Public House Brewing
- Pug Ryan's Brewery
- Pump House Brewery
- Pyramid Breweries Inc

=== Q ===
- Quincy Ships Brewing Company

=== R ===
- Rahr & Sons Brewing
- Rainer Brewing Company Inc.
- Ram Production Brewery
- RAM Restaurant and Brewery Boise
- RAM Restaurant and Brewery - Indianapolis
- RAM Restaurant and Brewery - Salem
- RAM Restaurant and Brewery - Seattle
- RAM Restaurant and Brewery - Wheeling
- Real Ale Brewing Company
- Red Ass Brewing Company
- Red Brick-Atlanta Brewing Company
- Red Lodge Ales Brewing Company
- Red Star Brewery & Grille
- Redfish New Orleans Brewhouse
- Redhook Brewery - Woodinville
- Redrock Brewing Company
- Redwood Brewing Company
- Redwood Coast Brewing Company
- Revolution Brewing
- Rhino Chasers
- Rhomberg Brewing Company
- Right Brain Brewery
- Rikenjaks Brewing Company
- Rio Salado Brewing Company
- River Market Brewing Company
- Riverside Brewing Company
- RJ Rockers Brewing Company
- Rochester Mills Beer Company
- Rock Bottom Brewery Arlington
- Rock Bottom Brewery Bellevue
- Rock Bottom Brewery Bethesda
- Rock Bottom Brewery Campbell
- Rock Bottom Brewery Chicago
- Rock Bottom Brewery Denver
- Rock Bottom Brewery Des Moines
- Rock Bottom Brewery Desert Ridge
- Rock Bottom Brewery King of Prussia
- Rock Bottom Brewery La Jolla
- Rock Bottom Brewery Long Beach
- Rock Bottom Brewery Milwaukee
- Rock Bottom Brewery Orland Park
- Rock Bottom Scottsdale CLOSED
- Rock Bottom Brewery Westminster
- Rockies Brewing Company
- Rocky River Brewing Company OH
- Rocky River Brewing Company TN
- Rockyard Brewing Company
- Rogue Ales
- Rohrbach Brewing Company
- Royal Oak Brewery
- Rubicon Brewing Company CLOSED
- Ruby Mountain Brewing Company
- Russian River Brewing Company

=== S ===
- Sacramento Brewing Company CLOSED
- Saint Arnold Brewing Company
- Salem Beer Works
- Salt Lake Brewing Company
- San Andreas Brewing Company
- San Diego Brewing Company
- San Tan Brewing Company
- The SandLot
- Santa Barbara Brewing Company CLOSED
- Santa Fe Brewing Company
- Saranac FX Matt Brewing Company
- Sarasota Brewing Company
- Saxer Brewing Company
- Schaefer Brewing Company
- Schlitz Brewing Company
- Shmaltz Brewing Company
- Schooner Brewery Net Gamelink
- Schooner's Grille & Brewery CLOSED
- Sea Dog Brewing Company
- Seabright Brewery
- Seagram Beverages
- Second Street Brewery
- Sharky's Brewery & Grill
- Shoe Tree Brewing Company
- Short's Brewing Company
- Sierra Blanca Brewing Company
- Sierra Nevada Brewing Company
- Silver City Brewery
- Silver Moon Brewing
- Sioux Falls Brewing Company
- Six Point Craft Ales
- Six Rivers Brewery
- Ska Brewing Company
- Sleeping Giant Brewing Company
- Sleeping Lady Brewing Company/ Snow Goose Restaurant
- Slesar Brothers Brewing Company
- SLO Brewing Company
- SLO Brewing Company Paso Robles
- SLO Brewing Company San Luis Obispo
- Sly Fox Brewing Company
- Smiling Moose Brewpub & Grill
- Smoky Mountain Brewery
- Smuggler's Brewpub
- Smylie Brothers Brewing Company
- Smuttynose Brewing Company
- Snake River Brewing
- Snake River Brewing Lander
- Snipes Mountain Brewing Company
- Snow Goose Restaurant
- Sonoma Brewing Company
- Sophisticated Otter Brewing Company
- Southampton Publick House
- Southend Brewery
- Southern Oregon and Pacific
- Spanish Peaks Brewing Company
- Spanish Springs Brewing
- Spoetzl Brewery
- Sports City Cafe & Brewery
- Sprecher Brewing Company
- Springfield Brewing Company
- Squatters Pub Brewery
- St. Ides Brewing Company
- Stanislaus Area Association
- Stark Mill Brewery
- Starr Hill Brewery
- Steamworks Brewing Company
- Steelhead Brewery Company
- Stevens Point Brewery
- Stewart's Brewing Company
- Stoddard's Brewhouse & Eatery
- Stone Brewing Company
- Stoudt's Brewing Company
- Strange Brewing Company
- Stroh Brewery Company
- Stuft Pizza & Brewing Company
- Sudwerk Privatbrauerei Hubsch
- Sullivan's Black Forest Brew Haus & Grill
- Summit Brewing Company
- Sun King Brewery Company
- Sun Valley Brewing Company
- Surly Brewing Company
- SweetWater Brewing Company
- Sweetwater Tavern & Brewery

=== T ===
- T-Bonz Homegrown Ales
- Tabernash Brewing Company
- Tap It Brewing Company
- Tap & Growler
- TAPS Fish House & Brewery
- Telegraph Brewing Company
- Telluride Brewing Company
- Tenaya Creek Brewery
- Tequesta Brewing Company
- Terrapin Beer Company
- Thai Me Up Brewing
- Third Street Aleworks
- Thirsty Dog Brewing Company
- Thomas Creek Brewery
- Thomas Kemper Brewery
- Thousand Oaks Brewing Company CLOSED
- Three Brothers Brewing Company
- Three Floyds Brewing
- Three Needs Brewery
- Thunder Canyon Brewery
- Tied House Cafe & Brewery
- Titanic Brewing Company
- Titletown Brewing Company
- Tommyknocker Brewery
- Trap Rock Restaurant and Brewery
- Tri-City Brewing Company
- Trinity Brewing Company
- Triple Rock Brewery and Alehouse
- Triumph Brewing Company New Hope
- Triumph Brewing Company of Philadelphia
- Triumph Brewing Company Princeton
- Tröegs Brewing Company
- Trout Brook Brewing Company
- Trumer Brauerei Berkeley
- Twenty Tank Brewery CLOSED
- Twisted Pine Brewing Company
- Tustin Brewing Company
- Two Rows Restaurant & Brewery
- Two Brothers Brewing Company
- Typhoon Brewery

=== U ===
- Uinta Brewing Company
- Uncle Billy's Brew & Que
- Uncle Billy's Brew & Que - Lake Travis
- Union Craft Brewing Company
- Union Colony Brewery
- Unique Beers
- Upland Brewing Company
- Upslope Brewing Company
- Upstream Brewing Company
- Urban South Brewery
- USA Cafe
- Utah Brewers Co-op

=== V ===
- Val Blatz Brewery
- Valhalla Microbrewery & Restaurant
- Valley Brewing Company
- Valley Forge Brewing Company
- Vermont Pub and Brewery
- Victory Brewing Company
- Vienna Brewing Company
- Village Brewery
- Vino's Pizza*Pub*Brewery
- Vintage Brewing Company
- Virginia Beverage Company CLOSED
- Virginia Brewing Company (AL) CLOSED
- Vulcan Brewing Company CLOSED

=== W ===
- Wagner Brewing Company
- Wagner Valley Brewing Company
- Walking Man Brewing
- Walnut Brewery
- Wasatch Brew Pub
- Water Street Brewery
- Waterloo Brewing Company CLOSED
- Watson Brothers Brewhouse
- Weasel Boy Brewing Company
- Weeping Radish Farm & Brewery
- Weinkeller Brewery
- West Bros Brewery
- Western Reserve Brewing
- Westwood Brewing Company
- Weyerbacher Brewing Company
- Widmer Brothers Brewing Company
- Wild Boar Brewing Company CLOSED
- Wild Duck Brewery & Restaurant
- Wild River Brewing
- The Willoughby Brewing Company
- Wilmington Brewing Company
- William S Newman Brewing Company
- Wind River Brewing Company
- Wolf Canyon Brewing Company
- Wolf Pack Brewing Company
- Wolf Tongue Brewery
- Wynkoop Brewing Company

=== Y ===
- Yak and Yeti Brewpub
- Yakima Brewing CLOSED
- Yards Brewing Company
- Yazoo Brewing Company
- Ybor City Brewing Company CLOSED
- Yegua Creek Brewing Company
- Yellowstone Valley Brewing Company

=== Z ===
- Zele International

== See also ==
- Beer and breweries by region
- Brewery
- Pub
- Regional brewery
