= No-Li Brewhouse =

Brewery in Washington state

- Interactive map of No-Li Brewhouse
- Location: Spokane, Washington, United States
- Coordinates: 47.662699°N 117.394008°W
- Opened: 2012
- Key people: John Bryant; Cindy Bryant
- Annual production volume: 20,050 (2024)
- Website: www.nolibrewhouse.com

Active beers
Name	Type
Big Juicy IPA	India Pale Ale
Born & Raised IPA	India Pale Ale
Jet Juiced IPA	India Pale Ale
Wrecking Ball Imperial Stout	Stout
Red, White and No-Li	Pale Ale
Corner Coast	Pac NW Ale
No-Li Amber	Amber Ale
Falls Porter	Porter
Spin Cycle Red	Original Red
Jet Star Imperial IPA	American IPA
March Forth IPA	Citrus IPA
Day Fade Huckleberry	Hard Seltzer
Day Fade Rainier Cherry	Hard Seltzer

No-Li Brewhouse is a brewery and restaurant in Spokane, Washington, United States, co-founded by brewmaster Mark Irvin and beer industry executive John Bryant, expanding on Irvin's Northern Lights Brewery. The brewery is known for its emphasis on local sourcing and local production; in 2013 it was designated a "Spokane Style Beer" producer. Formerly known as Northern Lights Brewing, the company markets such beers as Born & Raised IPA and Big Juicy IPA.

No-Li Brewhouse beverages are licensed for distribution in Washington and Idaho. The brewery has won various international awards for its beers.

No-Li Brewhouse is the oldest active brewery in Spokane. It is also Spokane's largest brewpub, located at the edge of the Spokane River near Gonzaga University. The company logo celebrates the Skyride over Spokane Falls.

== History ==
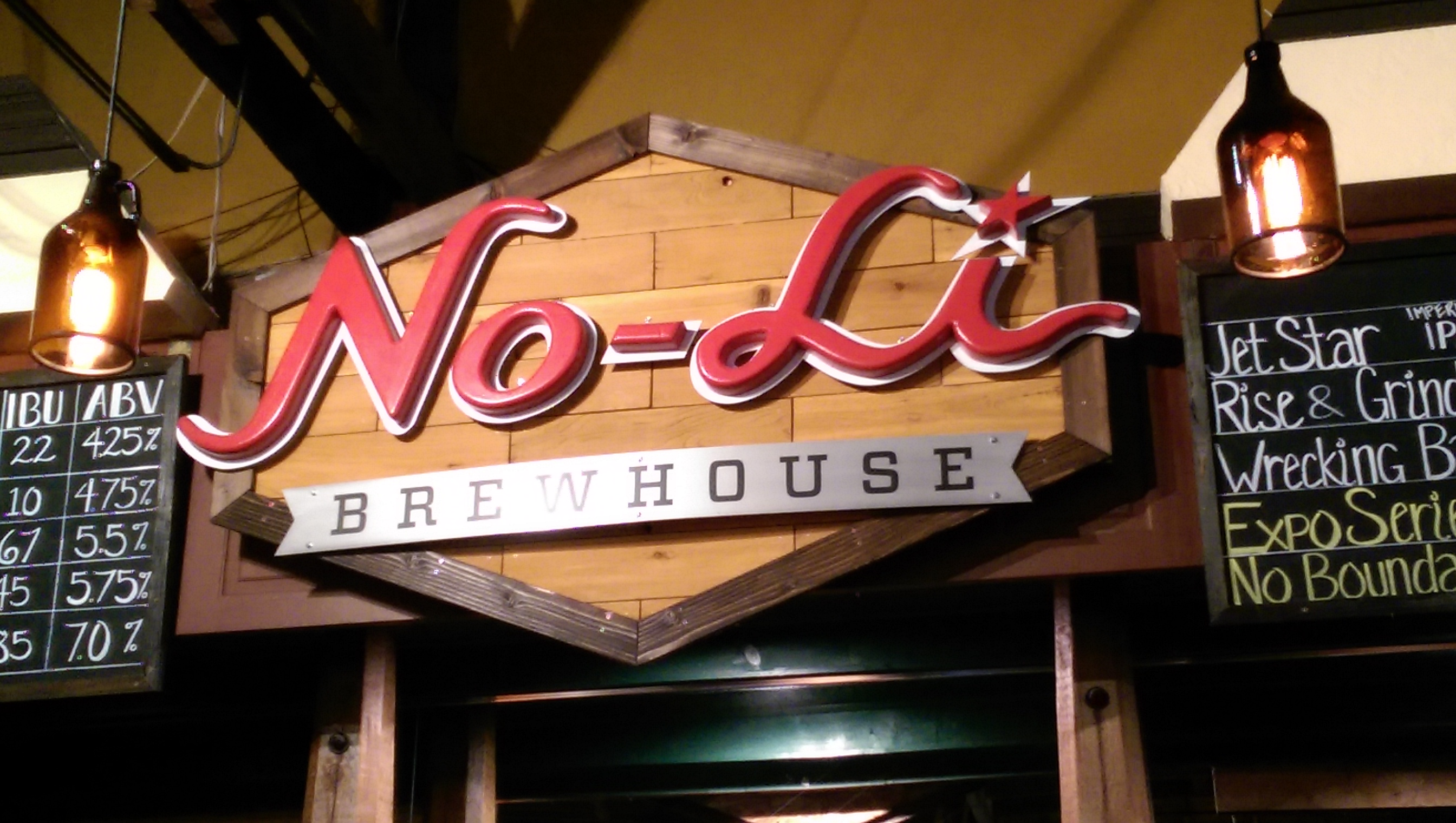
Inside the No-Li Brewhouse in Spokane, Washington.

The brewery was founded in 1993 as Northern Lights Brewery, first focusing on delivering kegs to restaurants. Brewmaster Mark Irvin started the brewery in Airway Heights, Washington, after working at Coeur d'Alene Brewing in Idaho and Hale's Ales in Seattle, Washington. In June 2002, Irvin moved Northern Lights from Airway to Spokane, its current location, to open as a brewpub. Beer industry executive John Bryant tasted Irvin's brews from time to time and in November 2011 offered a partnership. Bryant was a craft beer industry veteran, formerly associated with several beer brands, notably as vice president of sales and marketing of Deschutes Brewery, and chief operating officer of Odell Brewing Company.

Bryant worked to give the company an exclusive brand. The name "Northern Lights" was dropped in early 2012 after another American brewer, Starr Hill Brewery, did not respond to any of Bryant's requests to negotiate licensing for the brand which it was using for an IPA product. Bryant consulted with Greg Owsley, formerly chief of branding at New Belgium Brewing, and they worked with graphic artist Riley Cran in early 2012 to create a new logo and a series of new labels. Under Irvin and Bryant, Northern Lights officially rebranded as No-Li Brewhouse in April 2012. The logo shows three gondolas which represent the Skyride over Spokane Falls, a recreational aerial lift installed for Expo '74 and operated by Spokane ever since. (The brewhouse displays an original gondola from the ride.) No-Li soon entered several international beer competitions in North America, Japan and Europe, winning Gold, Silver and bronze medals.

== Production ==
The brewery produced 2,400 barrels of beer in 2012, 5,500 barrels in 2013, and was expected to produce about 8,000 in 2014.

In September 2014, country music singer Blake Shelton stopped by No-Li Brewhouse during a tour which included Spokane, and he liked the beverages enough to direct his road manager to buy hundreds of dollars of beer to take with him.

== Mission ==
No-Li Brewhouse places high importance on the ingredients of its brews being locally sourced, with local labor used to produce the beverages. The company began offering in September 2013 what it called "Fresh Sheet Kegs" to customers in Seattle and Portland.

In April 2013, No-Li Brewhouse received the newly approved federal designation of Spokane Style Beer, to differentiate beers made by Spokane area residents, with ingredients drawn from a 300-mile (480 km) radius.

== Recognition ==
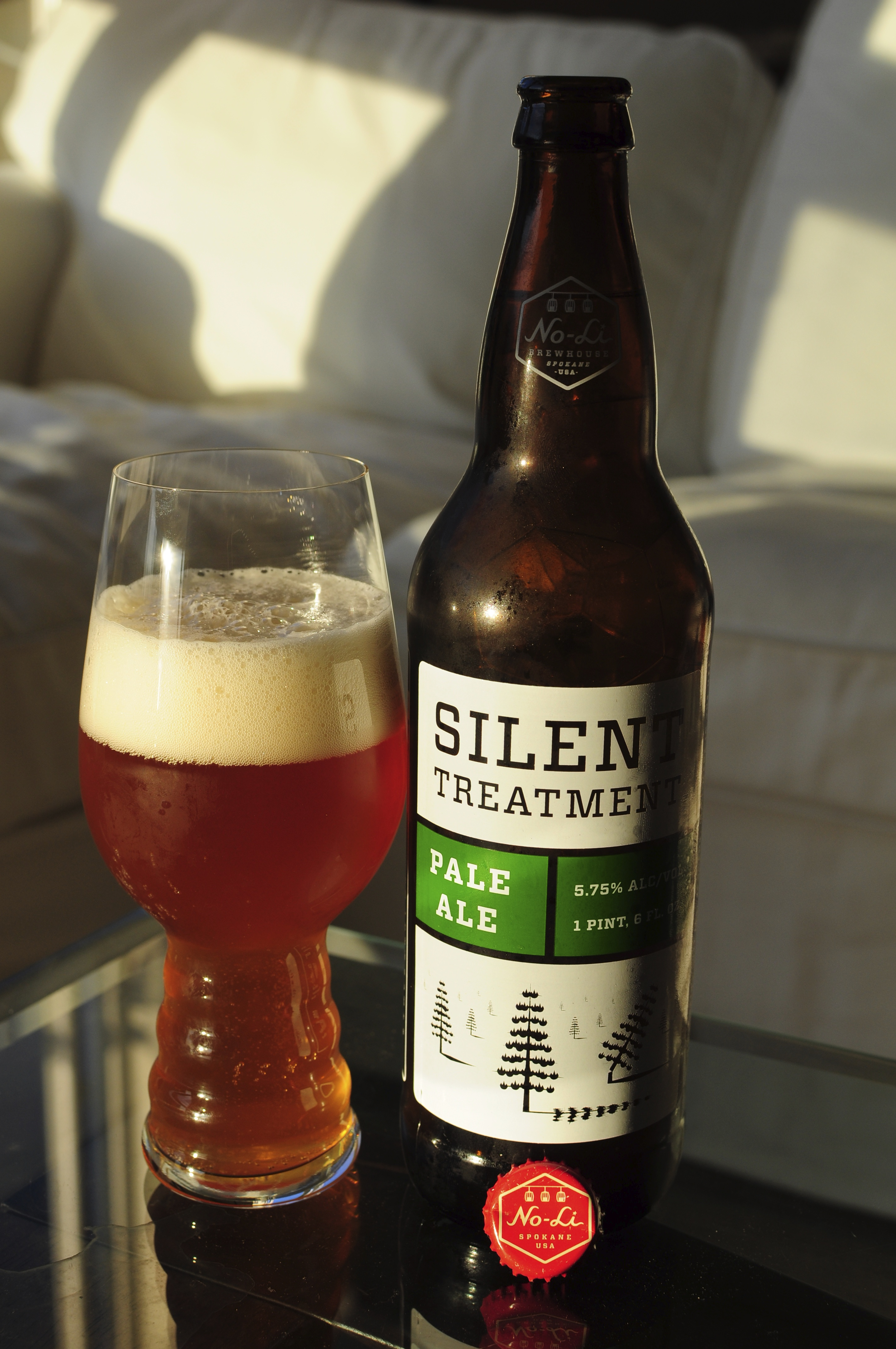
No-Li's Silent Treatment Pale Ale

- 2012 – Gold medal for Crystal Bitter ESB at the Great American Beer Festival
- 2012 – Gold medal for Crystal Bitter ESB at the International Beer Competition in Yokohama, Japan
- 2012 – Silver medal for Born & Raised IPA at the International Beer Competition in Yokohama, Japan
- 2012 – Silver medal for Silent Treatment IPA at the Brussels International Beer Competition
- 2012 – Silver medal for Crystal Bitter ESB at the Brussels International Beer Competition
- 2012 – Bronze medal at the European Beer Star Competition
- 2013 – Top Brewery to Watch, Draft Magazine
- 2013 – Best of the Northwest, by the Seattle Post Intelligencer
- 2013 – St. Louis Post-Dispatch Top 21 Beers of the Year: Crystal Bitter ESB
- 2013 – Bronze medal for Born & Raised IPA at the Australian International Beer Awards
- 2013 – Bronze medal for Silent Treatment Pale at the Australian International Beer Awards
- 2013 – Silver medal for Crystal Bitter ESB at the Australian International Beer Awards
- 2014 – Silver medal for Créme Ale at the Great International Beer & Cider Competition
- 2014 – Gold medal for Wrecking Ball Imperial Stout at the Great International Beer & Cider Competition
- 2014 – Gold medal for Aksel at the Great International Beer & Cider Competition
- 2014 – Silver medal for Rise & Grind at the Brussels International Beer Competition
- 2014 – Gold medal for Blackfill at the Brussels International Beer Competition
- 2015 – Bronze medal for Mosh Pit Tart Cherry at the Australian International Beer Awards
- 2015 – Bronze medal for Rise & Grind at the Australian International Beer Awards
- 2016 – Bronze medal for Born & Raised IPA at the Australian International Beer Awards
- 2016 – Silver medal for Red, White & No-Li at the Great International Beer & Cider Competition
- 2016 – Silver medal for Rise & Grind at the Brussels Beer Competition
- 2016 – Silver medal for Spin Cycle Red at the European Beer Star
- 2016 – Large Brewery of the year at the Washington Brewers Festivals
- 2017 – Bronze medal for Born & Raised IPA at the Australian International Beer Awards
- 2017 – Silver medal for Big Juicy IPA at the Australian International Beer Awards
- 2017 – Bronze medal for Spin Cycle Red at the Brussels Beer Challenge
- 2018 – Silver medal for Born & Raised IPA at the Washington Brewers Festival
- 2018 – Bronze medal for Falls Porter at the Australian International Beer Awards
- 2018 – Bronze medal for Born & Raised IPA at the Australian International Beer Awards
- 2018 – Silver medal for Born & Raised IPA at the 2018 World Beer Cup
- 2019 – Bronze medal for Wrecking Ball Imperial Stout at the Australian Beer Awards
- 2020 – Gold medal for Cascade Fog Hazy IPA at the World Beer Awards
- 2020 – Silver medal for Red, White & Hazy IPA at the World Beer Awards
- 2020 – Gold medal for Red, White & Hazy IPA at the Best of the Northwest SIP
- 2020 – Silver Medal for Corner Coast Golden Ale at the Best of the Northwest SIP Magazine
- 2020 – Gold medal for Born & Raised IPA at the Brussels Beer Challenge
- 2020 – Gold medal for Wrecking Ball Imperial Stout at the Brussels Beer Challenge
- 2020 – Silver medal for Big Juicy IPA at the US Open Beer Championship
- 2020 – Spokane Philanthropic Small Business of the Year
- 2021 - Double Gold medal - Wrecking Ball Imperial Stout - New York International Beer Competition
- 2021 - Gold medal - Porch Glow Amber Ale - New York International Beer Competition
- 2021 - Silver medal - Cascade Fog Hazy IPA - New York International Beer Competition
- 2021 - Bronze medal - Red, White & Hazy IPA - New York International Beer Competition
- 2021 - Bronze medal - Jet Juiced IPA - New York International Beer Competition
- 2021 - Washington Brewery of the Year - New York International Beer Competition
- 2021 - Silver - Threezy Does It - Australian International Brewing Awards
- 2021 - Silver - Wrecking Ball Imperial Stout - Australian International Brewing Awards
- 2021 - Silver - Red, White & Hazy - Australian International Brewing Awards
- 2021 - Silver - Jet Juiced IPA - Australian International Brewing Awards
- 2021 - Bronze - Cascade Fog Hazy IPA - Australian International Brewing Awards
- 2021 - Gold - Corner Coast Golden Ale - Can Can Awards
- 2021 - Bronze - Threezy Does It Hazy IPA - Can Can Awards
- 2021 - Gold - Red, White & Hazy IPA - World Beer Awards
- 2021 - Silver - Cascade Fog Hazy IPA - World Beer Awards
- 2021 - Silver - Threezy Does It Hazy IPA - World Beer Awards
- 2021 - Silver - Corner Coast Golden Ale - World Beer Awards
- 2021 - Silver - Porch Glow Amber - World Beer Awards
- 2021 - Silver - Wrecking Ball Imperial Stout - World Beer Awards
- 2021 - Gold - Big Juicy IPA - International Beer Awards
- 2021 - Gold - Wrecking Ball Imperial Stout - International Beer Awards
- 2021 - Gold - Jet Juiced IPA - International Beer Awards
- 2021 - Gold - Red, White & Hazy IPA - International Beer Awards
- 2021 - Gold - Cascade Fog Hazy IPA - International Beer Awards
- 2021 - Silver - Born & Raised IPA - International Beer Awards
- 2021 - Silver - Porch Glow Amber - International Beer Awards
- 2021 - Gold - Corner Coast Golden Ale - International Beer Awards
- 2021 - Bronze - Threezy Does It Hazy IPA - International Beer Awards
- 2021 - Silver - Wrecking Ball Imperial Stout - International Beer Cup
- 2021 - Bronze - Threezy Does It Hazy IPA - International Beer Cup
- 2021 - Bronze - Red, White & Hazy IPA - European Beer Star
- 2021 - Bronze - Big Juicy IPA - Brussels Beer Challenge

== External links and references ==
- Official website
