= Uinta Brewing Company =

Craft brewery in Salt Lake City, Utah

Coordinates: 40°43′58″N 111°57′15″W

- Type: Private
- Industry: Alcoholic beverage
- Founded: 1993
- Founder: Will Hamill
- Headquarters: Salt Lake City, Utah, USA
- Products: Beer
- Website: www.uintabrewing.com

Uinta Brewing Company is a craft brewery founded in 1993 in Salt Lake City, Utah, USA. The company produces a range of beers, naming them after Utah's cultural and natural icons. As of 2016, Uinta was the 39th-largest craft brewery in the country. Uinta is the largest brewer in the state of Utah.

== History ==
Uinta brewing company began brewing beer in the winter of 1993 in a renovated mechanics garage in Salt Lake City, Utah. Their flagship beer was Cutthroat Pale Ale, named after Utah's state fish. This was followed by King's Peak Porter, named after Utah's highest peak; Golden Spike Hefeweizen, named after the spike used to commemorate the completion of the transcontinental railroad, which was completed in Utah; and Dubhe, named after the Utah Centennial star.

In 2001, Uinta became the first Utah company to be 100% wind powered. The company also began installing solar panels on the brewery roof in 2011.

In 2024 and 2025 Uinta won gold medals in the American Cream Ale category at the Great American Beer Festival.

In 2026 won gold at World Beer Cup in the German Pilsner category for their 801 Pils.

== Financing and growth ==
In August 2014, Uinta announced that it sold a percentage of the company to New York-based private equity firm The Riverside Company for an undisclosed amount. Uinta CEO Will Hamill stated that the capital raised would be used to hire new employees, and expand beyond the Salt Lake City region.

Uinta had a period of accelerated growth in the 2010s. Uinta stated that it sold 60,000 barrels of beer in 2013, and 77,000 barrels in 2014.

As of March 2015, Uinta beers are sold in 32 states and Washington, D.C. This number has declined however, as they have withdrawn from multiple states during the second half of the 2020s decade.

Uinta saw its sales dip by 11% in 2024 compared to the previous year. This follows a trend of craft breweries struggling to keep sales up due to rising costs in the United States. According to the Brewers Association, the lobbying arm for independent brewers, sales of craft beer fell 4% in 2024.

== Products ==
=== Year Round Brews ===
- Cutthroat Pale Ale Pale Ale 5% ABV
- Hop Nosh IPA 7.3% ABV
- Hazy Nosh Hazy IPA 5% ABV
- Detour Double IPA 9.5% ABV
- Trop Nosh Tropical IPA 8% ABV
- 801 Pils Pilsner 5% ABV
- Baba Black Lager 4% ABV
- Wyld Juicy IPA 5% ABV
- Clear Daze Juicy IPA 6.6% ABV
- Lime Pilsner Flavored Pilsner 5% ABV
- Golden Spike Hefeweizen 5% ABV
- Trader Session IPA 5% ABV
- Pack It Out Session IPA 5% ABV
- Was Angeles American Lager 5% ABV

=== Seasonal Brews ===
- Yard Sale Winter Lager 5% ABV
- Season Pass Vanilla Porter 5% ABV
- SUM'R Kolsch 5% ABV
- Mango Lime Pilsner Flavored Pilsner 5% ABV
- Chile Limon Flavored Pilsner 5% ABV
- Punk'n Pumpkin Ale 5% ABV

=== Limited Small-Batch Brews ===
- Anniversary Barley Wine 10.4% ABV
- Dubhe Imperial Black IPA 9.2% ABV
- Monkshine Belgian Style Blonde Ale 6% ABV
- Fest Helles German Style Lager 5.7% ABV
- 801 Coffee Pilsner 4% ABV
- Cutthroat+ Winter Pale Ale 4% ABV
- Cockeyed Cooper
- Sum'r
- Birthday Suit

=== Brett (Brettanomyces) Brews ===
- Funk'n Patch Pumpkin Ale 8% ABV
- Croggy Saison 6.8% ABV
- Sea Legs Baltic Porter 8.2% ABV
- Hopscursion IPA 6.5% ABV

Their Hop Nosh IPA was designated "world class" by Beer Advocate.
