= Third Street Aleworks =

Brewery in Santa Rosa, California

- Industry: Alcoholic beverage
- Founded: 1996
- Headquarters: Santa Rosa, California, United States
- Products: Beer
- Website: thirdstreetaleworks.com

Third Street AleWorks is a brewery and former brewpub in downtown Santa Rosa, California, USA, which opened in 1996. Amongst the award-winning beers produced at Third Street AleWorks is the Blarney Sister's Dry Irish Stout, which has won numerous awards, including several golds.

== Awards ==
=== Annadel Pale Ale ===
- 2nd Place 2003 LA County Fair Craft Beer Competition (English Pale Ale)
- Gold 2002 Great American Beer Festival (English Pale Ale)
- Gold 2002 World Beer Cup (English Pale Ale)
- Bronze 2001 Great American Beer Festival (English Pale Ale)

=== Stonefly Oatmeal Stout ===
- Silver 2002 World Beer Cup (Oatmeal Stout)
- 1st PLace 2002 California State Fair Craft Brew Competition (Stout)
- 3rd Place 2001 California State Fair Craft Brew Competition
- 2nd Place 2001 San Diego Real Ale Festival (Dark Ales) Cask Ales

=== Bodega Head IPA ===
- 3rd Place 1998 California State Fair Craft Brew Competition (IPA)

=== Blarney Sister's Dry Irish Stout ===
- Bronze 2007 Great American Beer Festival (Classic Irish Style Dry Stout)
- Silver 2004 World Beer Cup (Dry Stout)
- Gold 2003 Great American Beer Festival (Dry Stout)
- Gold 2003 Real Ale Festival (Dry Stout) Bottle Conditioned Category
- Silver "Best of Show" 2003 Real Ale Festival
- 3rd Place 2003 LA County Fair Craft Brew Competition (Dry Stout)
- Gold 2002 Great American Beer Festival (Dry Stout)
- Gold 2002 World Beer Cup (Dry Stout)

=== One Tone Blackberry Ale ===
- 1st Place "Best of Show" 2004 El Dorado Craft Beer Competition
- 1st Place 2004 El Dorado Casino Craft Beer Competition
- 3rd Place 2003 LA County Fair Craft Brew Competition (Fruit)
- 1st Place "Best of Show" 2002 El Dorado Casino Craft Beer Competition
- 1st Place 2002 El Dorado Casino Craft Beer Competition
- 2nd Place 2002 California State Fair Craft Brew Competition
- Bronze 2001 Great American Beer Festival (Fruit Beers)
- 2nd Place 1999 California State Fair Craft Brew Competition
- 1st Place 1998 California State Fair Craft Brew Competition

== See also ==
- California breweries
