= Breakside Brewery =

Beer company based in Portland, Oregon, U.S.

- Headquarters: Portland, Oregon, United States
- Products: Beer
- Website: breakside.com

Breakside Brewery is a brewery based in Portland, Oregon, United States.

The business operates brewpubs on Dekum Street northeast Portland and in northwest Portland.

The IPA won a gold medal at the Great American Beer Festival in 2014.

== See also ==
- Australian International Beer Awards
- List of Great American Beer Festival medalists
