= Erie Brewing Company =

- Location: Erie, Pennsylvania, United States
- Opened: 1993
- Owned by: Rob Lowther
- Website: eriebrewingco.com

Active beers
Name	Type
Bayfront Blonde	Blonde-style ale
Derailed Black Cherry Ale	Cream ale
Final Destination	India pale ale
Mad Anthony's APA	American pale ale
Misery Bay IPA	India pale ale
Railbender Ale	Scottish-style ale

Seasonal beers
Name	Type
Erie Oktoberfest	Oktoberfest lager
Johnny Rails	Pumpkin ale
Ol' Red Cease & Desist	Wee heavy ale
Soleil Shandy	Shandy
Skipper's Stout	Stout

The Erie Brewery Company is an American brewery in Erie, Pennsylvania. Founded as a brewpub in 1993, Erie Brewing transitioned to a full-time brewery in 1999. The brewery has won three medals from the Great American Beer Festival.

== History ==
The Erie Brewing Company was established in January 1994 as brewpub—a combination brewery and restaurant—called Hoppers that was operated out of Union Station in downtown Erie. In 1999, Hoppers became a full microbrewery, took the name Erie Brewing, and moved into the former Pennsylvania Department of Transportation emissions testing building on West 12th Street. It was the first microbrewery to open in northwestern Pennsylvania. Erie Brewing filed for Chapter 11 bankruptcy in September 2005; the company was restructured and emerged from bankruptcy protection in 2006. A group of 21 investors from the private equity firm Cardinal Equity Associates owned the brewery from 2003 until 2012 when it was sold to its current owner Rob Lowther.

In June 2016, Erie Brewing announced it was to build and relocate to a new 19,900 square feet (1,800 m^{2}) facility in Harborcreek Township at Station Road (Pennsylvania Route 290) and Knowledge Parkway near Interstate 90; the company cited excessive, city fees and taxes for the inability to expand their current brewery and having to leave downtown.

== Beer ==
The Erie Brewing Company currently produces 6 beers year-round, 5 seasonally, and distributes to 13 states. Railbender Ale is Erie Brewing's best seller and most well-known beer; the beer has won two medals—in 2008 and 2009—from the Great American Beer Festival.

Name	Style	ABV %	IBU	Availability	Notes
Bayfront Blonde	Blonde-style ale	4.2	17	Year round	
Derailed Black Cherry Ale	Cream ale	5.0	17	Year round	
Erie Oktoberfest	Oktoberfest lager	7.8	16	Seasonal (October)	
Final Destination IPA	India pale ale	7.0	60	Year round	
Johnny Rails	Pumpkin ale	6.5	12	Seasonal (late summer–fall)	
Mad Anthony's APA	American pale ale	5.5	40	Year round	
Misery Bay IPA	India pale ale	6.5	75	Year round	
Ol' Red Cease & Desist	Wee heavy ale	10.1	35	Seasonal (November–December)	
Railbender Ale	Scottish-style ale	6.8	26	Year round	
Soleil Shandy	Shandy	3.5	15	Seasonal (April)	
Skipper's Stout	Stout	7.2	14	Seasonal (November)	

== Awards ==
Name	Award
Railbender Ale	2008 Great American Beer Festival Bronze (Scottish-style ale); 2009 Great American Beer Festival Gold (Scottish-style ale)
Derailed Black Cherry Ale	2011 Great American Beer Festival Bronze (Fruit beer)

== See also ==
- List of breweries in Pennsylvania
- List of microbreweries
- List of Great American Beer Festival medalists

== Sources ==
- Bryson, Lew (2010). Pennsylvania Breweries (4th ed.). Mechanicsburg, Pennsylvania: Stackpole Books. ISBN 978-0-8117-3641-1.
