= Maya Tea Company =

Beverage company in U.S. state of Arizona

- Industry: Beverage
- Founded: 1997
- Founder: Manish Shah and Yash Shah
- Headquarters: Tucson, Az, USA
- Products: Tea, Coffee, Spices, Teaware
- Owner: Manish Shah
- Website: www.mayatea.com

Maya Tea Company is a beverage company, based in Tucson, Arizona, that specializes in the production of custom tea blends, chai concentrates and southwestern spices.

== History ==
The company was first established in 1997 by founder and owner, Manish Shah, and his brother, cofounder Yash Shah. The name, "Maya", comes from the first two letters of the brothers' first names. The brothers started first by importing teas from China and India. The first sales outlet was a booth at the local farmers' market.

As the business expanded, operations were moved into a large warehouse on the west side of Tucson.

In 2014 a trademark "Maya Tea" was issued by the US Government. At that time Maya Tea Company teas were served in various coffeeshops, teahouses, restaurants, taverns, salons and hotels across the United States. The company also produces and distributes packaged leaves for home use.

Maya's teas can be found in many collaborative products, including Dogfish Head Brewery's Sah'tea beer, Terrapin Beer Company's Samurai Krunkle's ale, and Borderland Brewing Company's Hibiscus Saison and Agua Bendita Wheat Wine beers. The company has been featured in Fresh Cup Magazine's "2013 Tea Almanac", Tea Magazine, Tucson Lifestyle Home & Garden, and on the podcast, Steeping Around.
