= Hopworks Urban Brewery =

Brewery based in Portland, Oregon, U.S.

- Logo

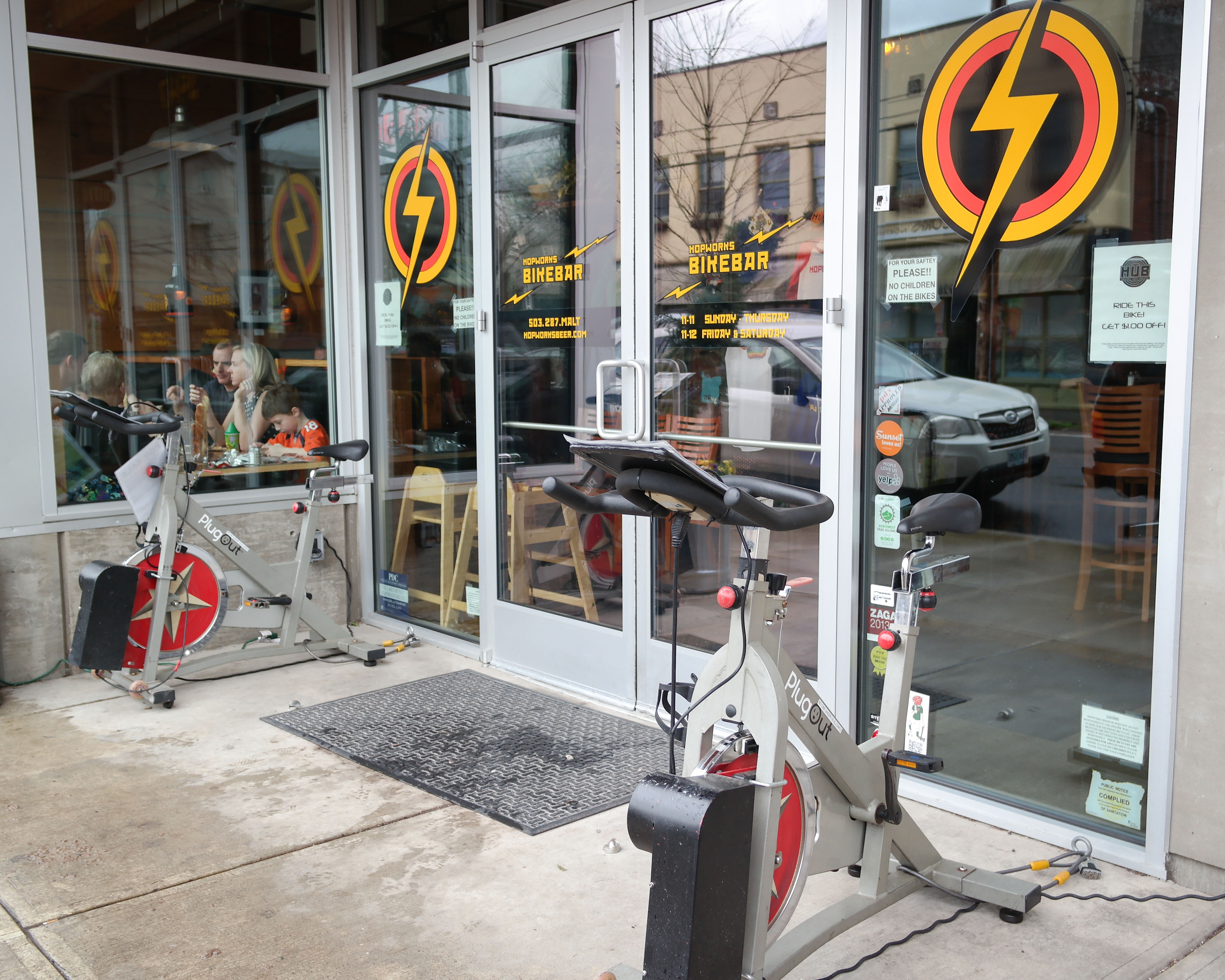
- Exterior of the defunct restaurant on North Williams Avenue, 2014
- Interactive map of Hopworks Urban Brewery
- Location: Portland, Oregon, United States
- Coordinates: 45.49686°N 122.63483°W
- Website: hopworksbeer.com

Hopworks Urban Brewery is a brewery based in Portland, Oregon, United States. The company has a flagship restaurant on Powell Boulevard, in southeast Portland's Creston-Kenilworth neighborhood, and an additional pub at Portland International Airport. Previously, there were additional restaurants on North Williams Avenue, and in Vancouver, Washington.

Christian Ettinger is the owner and brewmaster.

== History ==
Hopworks was founded by spouses Christian and Brandie Ettinger in 2007.

In late 2016, Hopworks expanded into Washington by opening a 6,000-square-foot brewpub and seven-barrel brewery in east Vancouver. The Portland International Airport restaurant opened in 2019.

In 2020, during the COVID-19 pandemic in Oregon, Hopworks' pub on North Williams Avenue closed. The Vancouver location remained open for nearly a decade before closing on August 9, 2025, as part of a strategic decision to refocus the company on its flagship Powell Boulevard location.

== Reception ==
Hopworks was a runner-up in the Best Family-Friendly Restaurant category of Willamette Week's annual 'Best of Portland' readers' poll in 2022. It ranked second and was a finalist in the same category in 2024 and 2025, respectively.

The brewery has been recognized at national competitions. At the 2025 Great American Beer Festival (GABF), Hopworks won a silver medal in the Extra Special Bitter (ESB) category for Velvet Organic ESB and a bronze medal in the Pumpkin Beer category for Great Gourds of Fire.

== See also ==
- List of cideries in the United States
- List of Great American Beer Festival medalists
