= Midnight Sun Brewing Company =

American craft brewery in Alaska

- Founded: 1995
- Headquarters: Anchorage, Alaska
- Products: Beer
- Production output: 10,000 bbls
- Owner: Mark Staples

Midnight Sun Brewing Company (MSBC) is a craft brewery that produces more than 40 ales and lagers each year. Founded in 1995, it is Anchorage, Alaska's first brewery and the second oldest in state history, following Alaska Brewing Co. in 1986. The brewery has been at its current location since May 2009, with a tap-house and full-service restaurant. MSBC has received medals at the Great American Beer Festival and the World Beer Cup. The brewery sells its beers in 12-oz cans, 22-oz bottles, 5 gallon kegs, and 64 oz growlers. Their U.S. distribution is limited to AK, WA, ID, OR, CA, HI, and NY.

== History ==
Mark Staples and Barbara Miller founded Midnight Sun Brewing Co. in 1995. Their original location on Arctic Boulevard shared an industrial space with Knight's Taxidermy, the business featured on reality television program, Mounted in Alaska. The brewery moved to its present location in South Anchorage in 2009, where it expanded brewery operations to 10,000 barrel capacity, increased customer seating, and began food service in The Loft. MSBC began pouring beer at Williwaw Social in downtown Anchorage in 2018, allowing servings above the state-regulated 36-ounce limit for Alaska breweries.

The brewery has participated in Anchorage's First Fridays art walk through its First Firkin Fridays events, which feature local artists at The Loft. The guest artist opens a cask of conditioned beer at each event.

In 2016 the label art of Panty Peeler Belgian-Style Tripel Ale drew criticism on social media and coverage in the national press. In 2017 the Brewers Association introduced restrictions on publicizing awards for beers with names or labels it considered offensive. These beers remained eligible to win awards.

Business Insider noted Midnight Sun Brewing Co. in 2017 as one of the top-rated brewers in the country, and Anchorage, AK as a "Top 10 Craft Beer City".

MSBC has sponsored and participated in local Pride Month events, including the Rainbow Run and Brewed with Pride, a collaboration among breweries that release beers for Pride Month and donate kegs to local charities. In 2019 MSBC released Stonewall Riot.

=== Former brewers ===
Head brewer Gabe Fletcher left MSBC in 2010 to establish Anchorage Brewing Company. Head brewer Ben Johnson, responsible for the creation of MSBC's Berserker Imperial Stout, left in 2011 to open Mumbai, India's first microbrewery. After several other projects and world travel, Johnson opened Carabao brewery in Guam in 2019.

== Products ==
Ben McFarland included Panty Peeler in his 2009 book World's Best Beers: One Thousand Craft Brews from Cask to Glass. The brewery and its Arctic Rhino Coffee Porter were mentioned in The Cities Book, published by Lonely Planet in 2017.

== Awards ==
- Great American Beer Festival
  - Bronze 2005 – Arctic Rhino Coffee Porter – Coffee flavored beer
  - Bronze 2006 – Arctic Devil – Barley wine style
  - Bronze 2006 – Arctic Rhino Coffee Porter – Coffee flavored beer
  - Gold 2007 – Imperial Pumpkin Chocolate Porter (later named TREAT) – Experimental Ale
  - Silver 2008 – Pride – Belgian & French Style Ale
- World Beer Cup
  - Bronze 2008 – Pride – Belgian / French
- Can Can Awards
  - Silver 2016 – Panty Peeler – Belgian style ale
  - Bronze 2017 – Panty Peeler – Belgian style ale
