= Dry Dock Brewing Company =

Brewing company based in Aurora, Colorado, United States

- Industry: Alcoholic beverage
- Founded: 2005
- Founder: Kevin DeLange & Michelle Reding
- Headquarters: Aurora, Colorado, USA
- Number of locations: 2
- Products: Beer
- Production output: 21,000 US beer barrels (2,500,000 L; 650,000 US gal; 540,000 imp gal)
- Owner: Kevin DeLange and Michelle Reding
- Website: http://www.drydockbrewing.com/

Dry Dock Brewing Company is an American brewery located in southeast Aurora, Colorado. Since its founding in 2005, Dry Dock has received awards from the World Beer Cup and the Great American Beer Festival. It was named "Small Brewing Company of the Year," in 2009 at the Great American Beer Festival. Owned by Kevin DeLange and Michelle Reding, Dry Dock Brewing Co. was the first brewery in Aurora, Colorado to open with a 7 BBL brewhouse.

== History ==
The 2005 brewhouse opened in a 900-square-foot space next to their original business, The Brew Hut, a homebrew supply shop. The brewery was given its name because of DeLange's interest in nautical history.

Dry Dock expanded in 2009 and again in 2011. The brewery now runs a 7 BBL taphouse, including a tasting room with 180 seats and eighteen taps. It is located in its original Hampden Avenue location, which is called "Dry Dock."

In 2013, Dry Dock nearly quadrupled its production numbers, jumping from 3,200 barrels in 2012 to 12,000 barrels in that year. This increase came with the purchase of a 30,000-square-foot production facility, North Dock. Dry Dock now has the capacity for expansion that enables the brewing of 30,000 barrels/year. In the brewery, it cans its line of beers, including Apricot Blonde, Amber Ale, Sour Apricot Blonde, Hop Abomination, Hazy IPA, and Vanilla Porter.

In September 2014, Dry Dock opened the Canoe Room, a four-tap tasting room inside its North Dock facility. This has since grown to twelve taps. The tasting room serves both draft and canned beer. The room, once the storage area for The Boy Scouts of America Aurora Chapter's canoes, became known as the "Canoe Room," thus giving the tasting room its name.

== Beers ==
=== Home fleet ===
Name	Style	ABV%	IBU
Dry Dock Apricot Blonde	Fruit Beer	5.1	17
Dry Dock Amber Ale	ESB	5.8	49
Dry Dock Vanilla Porter	Porter	5.4	33
Sour Apricot	Kettle Sour	5.0	12
Dayboard Lager	Lager	4.5	
Hazy IPA	Hazy IPA	6.3	
Hop Abomination IPA	IPA	6.5	100

== Bottled beers ==
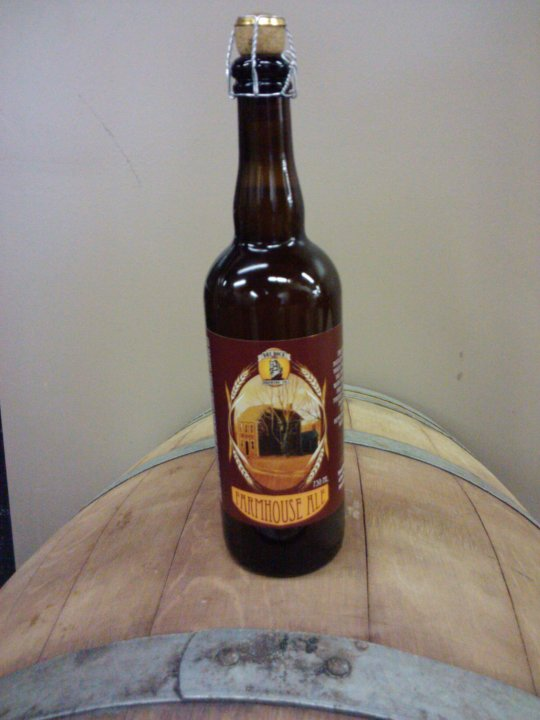
Farmhouse Ale Saison

After purchasing a 6-head bottler, Dry Dock began bottling their Seven Seas Double IPA for release in the greater Denver area. Since then, Dry Dock has bottled a wide variety of different beers to date, most notably, Bligh's Barleywine (an English Style Barleywine) and their annual barrel-aged Signature Series releases.

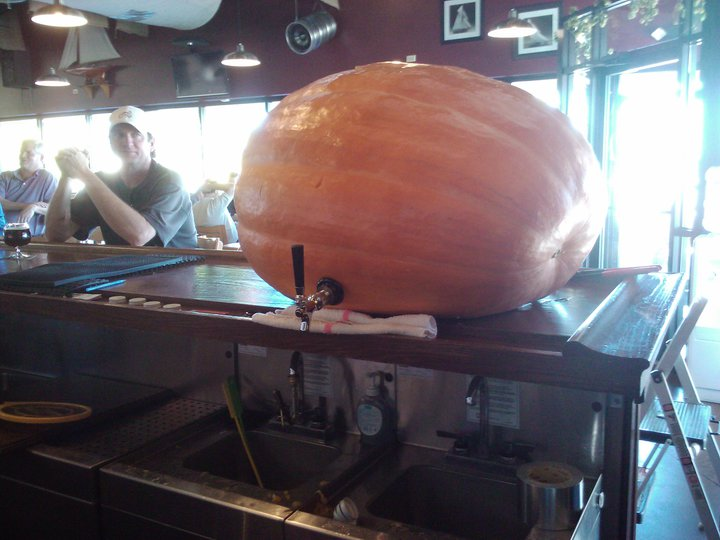
Pumpkin Ale Firkin

== Small Batch Friday ==
Each and every Friday, Dry Dock taps a special one-off firkin, a cask-conditioned variation of their available beers. Occasionally, the beers are conditioned with odd items such as wasabi and rice.

In 2010, Dry Dock served their Kölsch from a watermelon and their Half Moon Pumpkin Ale through a locally-grown 208 lb pumpkin.

== Awards ==
Dry Dock established itself early on by word-of-mouth, and put itself on the map when it won a gold 2006 World Beer Cup for its HMS Victory ESB (now Dry Dock's Amber Ale). Dry Dock has since been the recipient of 25 GABF medals (5 gold, 12, silver, 8 bronze), the prestigious Brewers Association’s Small Brewery of the Year award (2009), and 8 World Beer Cup awards (3 gold, 3 silver, 2 bronze). Since its founding in 2005, Dry Dock has received awards from the World Beer Cup and the Great American Beer Festival. It was named "Small Brewing Company of the Year" in 2009 at the Great American Beer Festival.

== See also ==
- Barrel-aged beer
