= Empire Brewing Company =

Microbrewery and restaurant in Syracuse, New York

- Company type: Private
- Industry: Alcoholic beverage, brewery, restaurant
- Predecessor: Walton Street Brewing Company
- Founded: 1994
- Founder: David Katleski
- Headquarters: 120 Walton Street, Syracuse, New York, USA
- Products: Beer, food
- Website: empirebrew.com

Empire Brewing Company was a Syracuse, New York-based microbrewery and restaurant founded by owner, David Katleski, in 1994. The company was known for their craft brews and their locally sourced, seasonal food menus. In 2013, Empire Brewing Company was featured on an episode of Diners, Drive-ins, and Dives. Empire's beers won nine medals at the Great American Beer Festival and two World Beer Cups.

In 2013, Katleski was awarded the F.X. Matt Defender of the Industry Award at the Craft Brewers Conference for his work supporting the interests of New York's craft brewers.

In 2016 Empire constructed a new brewing and packaging facility in Cazenovia, New York. The farm brewery sits on 22 acres of farmland which has been cultivated for barley, hops and other brewing ingredients. In August 2019, the Empire Farm Brewery filed for chapter 11 bankruptcy protection after facing more than $10,000,000 in debts. Both the Empire Farm Brewery as well as the Walton Street location have since closed.
