= Triumph Brewing Company =

Regional brewpub operator

Coordinates: 40.349°N 74.660°W

- Industry: Alcoholic beverage, food service
- Founded: 1995
- Area served: Princeton, New Jersey; New Hope, Pennsylvania; Philadelphia, Pennsylvania; Red Bank, New Jersey
- Products: Beer
- Production output: ~2450 U.S. barrels
- Owner: Independent - Erica Disch, Ray Disch, Adam Fitting, Adam Rechnitz Founders
- Website: https://www.triumphbrewing.com/

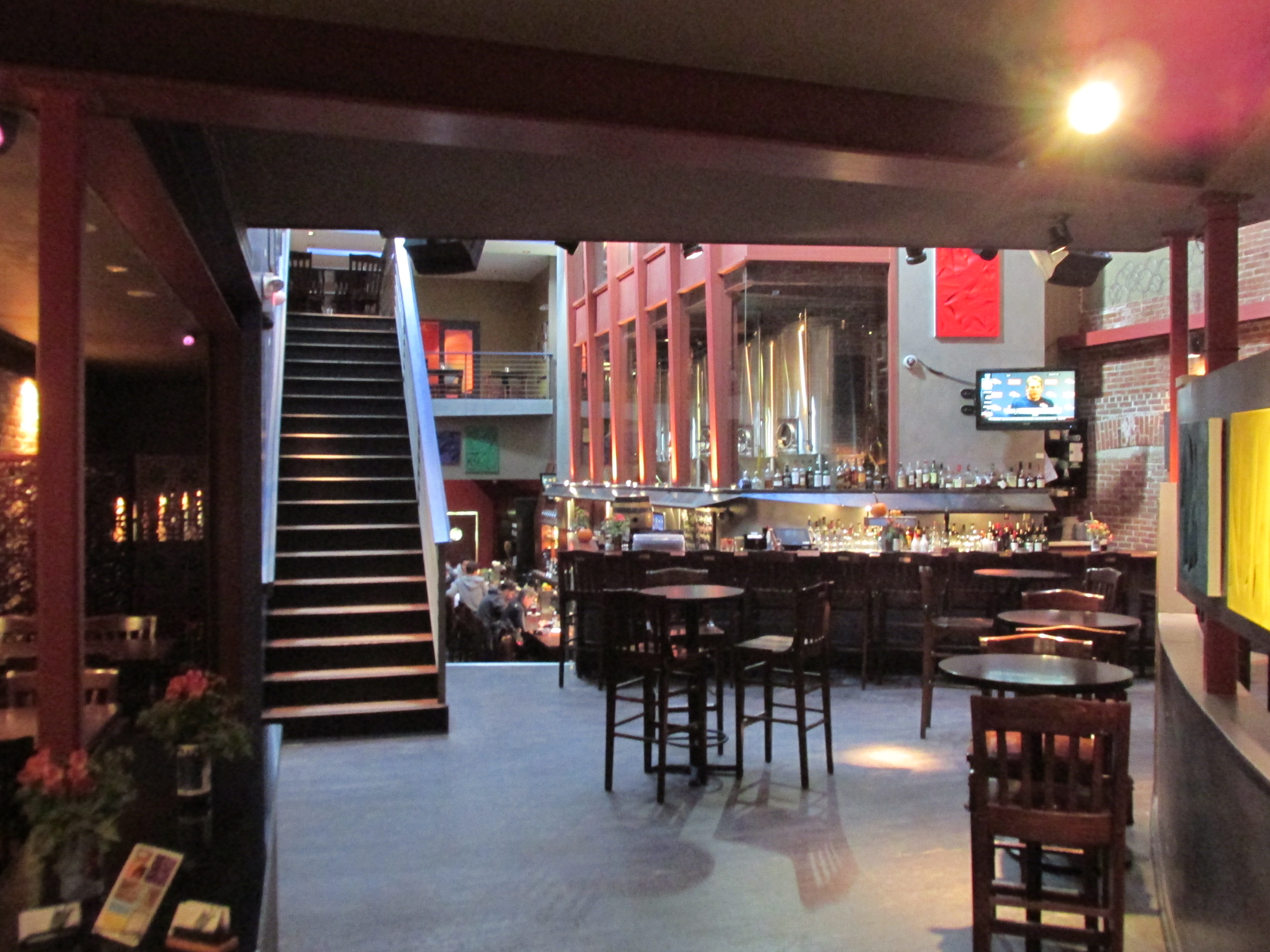
Triumph Brewing Company in Princeton

Triumph Brewing Company is a regional brewpub operator with locations in Princeton, New Jersey; Red Bank, New Jersey; New Hope, Pennsylvania; and formerly Philadelphia.

The original operating name, "Victory Brewing Company," was changed to avoid trademark disputes with an existing United Kingdom brand. This occurred before the Victory Brewing Company of Downingtown, Pennsylvania had yet to be established. Initial construction plans for a Lambertville, New Jersey location never materialized.

== History ==
Renovation of the Princeton location began in the spring of 1994 and it opened to the public on March 19, 1995. The first purpose-built brewpub in the state, the 12,000-square-foot (1,100 m^{2}) facility features 30-foot-high (9.1 m) cathedral ceilings, seating for over 275 people, and a two-story, glass-enclosed brewhouse. The non-automated 11-barrel stainless steel brewery was fabricated by Newlands Systems of Abbotsford, British Columbia. In 2006, The Star-Ledger called it "probably the state's grandest brew pub grandest," and in 2005, New Jersey Monthly described the interior as the "most architecturally striking" of any in the state. The brewing equipment is behind the bar and visible to patrons, and the decor is industrial chic. The brewpub "has long produced more beer than any" other in the state.

Triumph's second location opened April 24, 2003, at Union Square in New Hope, Pennsylvania. Located on the site of a Union Camp Corporation paper bag manufacturing facility, this redeveloped building formerly served as storage for massive bulk rolls of paper. It is adjacent to the historic New Hope and Ivyland Railroad station and the James A. Michener Art Museum.

Triumph's third location opened on April 4, 2007, at 117-121 Chestnut Street in Old City, Philadelphia. In 2014 this location was closed and sold to 2nd Story Brewing Co.

The Red Bank location was approved in 2006, and construction began in 2015; it opened November 5, 2018.

The Princeton and New Hope locations were designed by Richardson Smith Architects. The Philadelphia location was designed by Riscala Design.

== Awards ==
GABF Medals

Year	Medal	Style	Name	Brew Location
2004	Gold	Beer with Yeast	Triumph Kellerbier	New Hope, PA
2004	Silver	Smoke Beer	Triumph Rauchbier	Princeton, NJ
2005	Gold	American-Style Wheat Beer	Triumph Honey Wheat	New Hope, PA
2005	Silver	European-Style Dark / Münchner Dunkel	Triumph Dunkel	New Hope, PA
2005	Silver	Bohemian-Style Pilsener	Triumph Czech Pilsener	Princeton, NJ
2005	Bronze	German-Style Pilsener	Triumph German Pilsener	New Hope, PA
2006	Bronze	English-Style India Pale Ale	Triumph Bengal Gold	New Hope, PA
