= RJ Rockers Brewing Company =

- Industry: Alcoholic beverage
- Founded: 1997
- Founder: Mark R. Johnsen
- Headquarters: Spartanburg, South Carolina, USA
- Products: Beer
- Production output: 9,600 US beer barrels (1,130,000 L; 300,000 US gal; 250,000 imp gal)
- Owner: TakoSushi
- Number of employees: 6
- Website: http://www.rjrockers.com/

RJ Rockers Brewing Company is a beer brewing company based in Spartanburg, South Carolina, founded in 1997 by Mark R. Johnsen. The company is considered a microbrewery meaning it has an annual production of less than 15,000 barrels.

== History ==
The company began as a brewpub on Morgan Square in downtown Spartanburg, but in 2002 Johnsen decided to leave the restaurant business and concentrate solely on producing craft beer. Johnsen soon relocated his 10 barrel brewing system to a Spartanburg industrial park off of the Interstate 85 Business Loop. This location reached full capacity after the company experienced 92% growth in 2008, and in February 2009 RJ Rockers Brewing Company leased a building in downtown Spartanburg's west end that was formerly occupied by The Salvation Army. The 46,000-square-foot (4,300 m^{2}) facility features a 30 barrel brewing system with an annual capacity of 18,000 barrels.

== Beers produced ==
RJ Rockers Brewing Company sells its beer in bottles, cans, and on draft. Annually, RJ Rockers releases 11 beers in bottles but produces many more that are draft only "specialty brews". In February 2015, RJ Rockers released its first barrel aged beer (BA Black Perle), thus beginning a series of beers that have been aged in Whiskey, Bourbon, Pinot Noir, and Rum Barrels from various vineyards and distilleries across the U.S. and the U.S. Virgin Islands. To date, bottles from the Barrel Aged Series are only sold at the downtown Spartanburg brewery.

Beer Name	Year Created	Description
Brown Eyed Squirrel (formerly Bald Eagle Brown)	1997	An English-style brown ale. Its main characteristic is a deep brown color that comes from a combination of Chocolate and Black malt. Brown Eyed Squirrel most recently won the Bronze Medal at the 2014 U.S. Open Beer Championship. It is 5.4% Abv
Bell Ringer Ale	2007	A nontraditional style ale, sometimes referred to as an "imperial ESB", created by Johnsen in 2007 to celebrate a bill that legalized high-gravity beers in South Carolina. It contains a high content of malt and hops and is one of RJ Rockers' highest gravity beers at 8.5% Abv.
Black Perle	2009	A ninety-minute "octo-hopped" (8 hop additions) dark India Pale Ale and was the first RJ Rockers beer to be distributed in a 4-pack. It is 9% Abv
Dunkulele (formerly Buckwheat After Dark)	2015	An American-style dunkelweizen which has become the company's fall seasonal. Dunkulele is the perfect beer for a crisp Autumnal evening. Best enjoyed while wearing flannel according to owner, Johnsen. It is unfiltered and 5.6% Abv.
Buckwheat Ale	1997	An American-style hefeweizen or wheat ale. One of Johnsen's original brewpub recipes that was once retired, Buckwheat came back to the RJ Rockers taproom in July 2015. It is unfiltered and 5.5% Abv.
Fish Paralyzer Ale (retired)	2010	A Belgian-Style Pale Ale. It is 7.5% Abv.
Honey Amber Ale	1997	An American-style Amber ale that contains Clover Honey. It is 5.8% Abv.
Light Rock Ale	1997	A light-bodied ale brewed in the tradition of a German Kölsch and gold medal winner in the English-style Summer Ale category of the 2009 Great American Beer Festival. It is advertised at 119 calories and 4.5% Abv.
Patriot Pale Ale	1997	An American pale ale hopped with Cascade hops and Challenger hops. It is considered the company's flagship beer and is 5.9% Abv.
Rockhopper India Pale Ale	2010	A Ninety Minute India Pale Ale named by fans in the "Name our IPA competition". It is 7.5% Abv.
Son of a Peach Wheat Ale	2009	Now an addition to the year-round lineup, Son of a Peach was created in 2009 and gold medal winner of the Fruit and Vegetable Beer category of the 2009 Los Angeles International Commercial Beer Competition and in 2013 (SOAP) took home the bronze at the U.S. Open Beer Championship. It is an unfiltered American wheat ale that uses both real South Carolina peaches and a natural peach extract. Its Abv is 5.8%.
Good Boy Stout	1997	An American stout that is brewed on a limited basis. Good Boy Stout is named after Johnsen's black lab, Stout, who is also the official greeter of RJ Rockers and who won the 2014 Spartanburg Love Where You Live Tourism Ambassador Award for his "service" to downtown Spartanburg. It is 7.0% Abv.
The First Snow Ale	1997	A spiced pale ale brewed during the winter season. It contains a blend of five spices and honey and is 6.0% Abv.

Given Johnsen's service in the US Army as a Ranger, several of the original beers by RJ Rockers carry patriotic names, i.e. Bald Eagle Brown Ale, Patriot Pale Ale and Star Spangled Stout. While some names have changed over time, RJ Rockers' patriotic nature remains.

== Locations sold ==
RJ Rockers does not distribute anymore.

== See also ==
- Barrel-aged beer
