= Carolina Brewery =

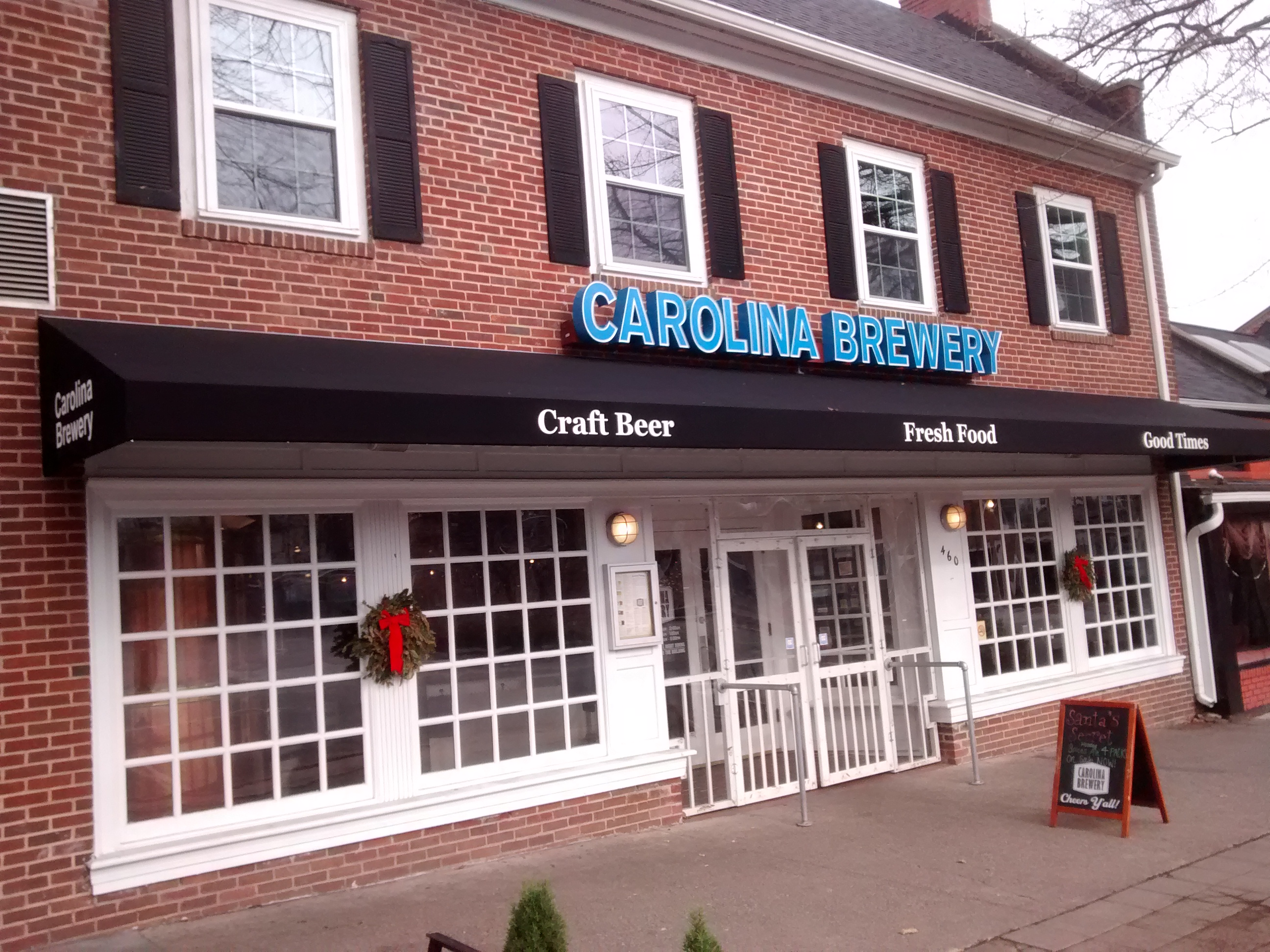
Carolina Brewery in January 2015

Carolina Brewery is a beer brewery and restaurant/pub with locations in Chapel Hill and Pittsboro, North Carolina. Carolina Brewery has drawn international attention for its handcrafted beers. Founded in 1995, Carolina Brewery is the oldest brewery in the Triangle area. It was one of the first craft breweries in North Carolina. The restaurant serves contemporary American cuisine and features a seasonal menu.

== Awards ==
- Copperline Amber Ale
  - 2020 Best in Show, NC Craft Brewers Guild
  - Gold Medal, World Beer Championships
- Sky Blue Kölsch
  - 2020 First Place for Alternative Fermentation, NC Craft Brewers Guild
  - Silver Medal World Beer Championships
- Flagship India Pale Ale
  - Gold Medal, 2006 Great American Beer Festival
- Best Brewpub in the Southeast by Brewpub Magazine
- Best Overall Brewery at Hopfest 2004
- Best Burger in the Triangle by Independent Magazine and the readers of The Daily Tar Heel.

== Beers Available Year-Round ==
Carolina Brewery offers four beers year-round in 6- and 12-packs at retailers and on draft at Carolina Brewery's brewery restaurants and at other restaurants and bars:

- Sky Blue Kolsch
- Copperline Amber Ale
- American IPA
- Costero Mexican Lager

== Limited Edition Seasonal Specials ==
Carolina Brewery offers rotating selection of draft beer at Carolina Brewery's brewery restaurants and at other restaurants and bars"

- Dogwood Citrus Ale
- Oatmeal Porter
- Czech Pilsner
- Oktoberfest
- Santa's Secret
