= Terrapin Beer Company =

American brewery in Athens, Georgia

- Interactive map of Terrapin Beer Company
- Location: Athens, Georgia, USA
- Coordinates: 33.98054°N 83.39673°W
- Opened: 2002
- Owned by: Brian "Spike" Buckowski and John Cochran
- Parent: Tilray

Terrapin Beer Company is a brewery founded in 2002 by Brian "Spike" Buckowski and John Cochran in Athens, Georgia, United States. In July 2016, Molson Coors announced its majority stake in Terrapin, ending its status as a craft brewery.

== History ==
Founders John Cochran, a 1993 University of Georgia graduate, and Brian "Spike" Buckowski a 1996 American Brewers Guild (California) graduate - met in 1998 while working at Atlanta Brewing Company. Both men had been homebrewing for years, and decided to partner with each other to start a brewing company in Athens, Georgia. Buckowski, a Grateful Dead fan, named the brewery after his favorite Grateful Dead album Terrapin Station. After creating a business plan, Buckowski and Cochran spent three unsuccessful years pitching investors to fund their startup costs for the Terrapin Brewing Company. In April 2002, they created and introduced Terrapin's Rye Pale Ale at the Classic City Brew Fest in Athens, Georgia - which garnered praise by beer aficionados across the U.S. In October 2002, its Rye Pale Ale was awarded the American Pale Ale Gold Medal at the Great American Beer Festival in Denver, Colorado - which helped garner Terrapin distribution opportunities across Atlanta. Terrapin began contract brewing with several breweries to produce their beer including; Frederick Brewing Company (now Flying Dog Brewery) in Frederick, Maryland, and Zuma Brewing Company in Atlanta, Georgia.

In 2006, Terrapin obtained an $800,000 investment from a pool of Athens' investors, which allowed them to buy brewing equipment and lease a small facility in Athens, Georgia where they began producing their own beer. In 2008, the brewery moved to a larger 45,000 square-foot facility at 265 Newton Bridge Road, Athens, Georgia, where it could produce up to 18,500 barrels per year. Terrapin Brewing Company offers tastings and tours and averages 30,000 visitors per year. This facility remains in operation today, and now consists of a Taproom/Tasting Room, Gift Shop, Brewery, and it also has office space above the building.

Terrapin Brewing Company was acquired by Tilray Beverages in September 2024. They launched a rebrand in February 2025.

== Beers ==
=== Year Round Beers ===
- Hopsecutioner Killer IPA, ABV 7.3%, IBU 58 (Resinous, Pine, Balanced)
- Imperial Hopsecutioner Killer Double IPA, ABV 9.8%, IBU 88 (Resinous, Aggressive, Big)
- Cerveza Mexican-Style Lager, ABV 5.1%, IBU 25 (Straw, Crisp, Balanced)
- RecreationAle LoCal IPA, ABV 4.2%, IBU 34 (Hoppy, Bright, Crisp)
- Coastal Daydream West Coast-Style IPA, ABV 6.3%, IBU 62 (Dank, Resiny Bitter, Medium)
- Luau Krunkles POG IPA, ABV 6.5%, IBU 38 (Tropical, Fruity, Juicy)
- Imperial Luau Krunkles Double IPA, ABV 9%, IBU 69 (Tropical, Fruity, Full)
- Depth Perception Double IPA, ABV 9.1%, IBU 75 (Dank, Resiny Bitter, Full)
- High & Hazy IPA, ABV 5.8%, IBU 46 (Tropical, Fruity, Smooth)

=== Seasonal Sessions ===
- Mosaic Red Rye IPA, ABV 6.3%, IBU 75, O.G. 14.4
- Maggie's Farmhouse Ale, ABV 5.3%, IBU 22, O.G. 11.5
- Pumpkinfest, ABV 6.1%, IBU 14.5, O.G. 14.5
- Moo-Hoo, ABV 6.0%, IBU] 30, O.G. 13.7

=== Monster Beer Tour ===
- Hop Selection, ABV 8.7%, IBU 80, O.G. 18.5
- Wake 'N' Bake, ABV 8.6%, IBU 50, O.G. 20.8

== Ownership ==
In 2011, Terrapin Beer Co. sold a minority interest of less than 25% to MillerCoors's craft and import division Tenth and Blake Beer Company a subsidiary of Molson Coors The minority ownership was given in exchange for reducing a loan made by Tenth and Blake Beer Company in December 2010 to buy out a group of Terrapin investors. In a 2013 interview, co-founder John Cochran claimed that the financing agreement between Tenth and Blake Beer Company and Terrapin Beer Co. did not include equity. He claimed that co-founders Cochran and Buckowski owned more of the company than they had prior to the Tenth and Blake deal. Nevertheless, on July 20, 2016, MillerCoors announced that it had taken a majority interest in Terrapin Beer Co. through its Tenth and Blake Beer Company division. The transaction was completed in August 2016.

Terrapin Brewing Company was acquired by Tilray Beverages in September 2024. They launched a rebrand in February 2025.
