= Bluegrass Brewing Company =

Brewery and brewpub chain based in Louisville, Kentucky

Bluegrass Brewing Company was a brewery and a chain of brewpubs based in Louisville, Kentucky, USA.

== History (production) ==
Bluegrass Brewing Company was founded as a brewpub in Louisville, Kentucky in 1993 by chief brewer David Pierce and a small group of beer investors. In the late 1990s, Pipkin Brewing Company began contract brewing and bottling Bluegrass Brewing Company beers. In 2001, the Bluegrass Brewing Company acquired the Pipkin Brewing Company, which was then located at 636 East Main Street in Louisville. At that time, the brewpub and brewery separated into two distinct companies sharing a common name. The Main Street brewery focused on packaging and distributing their beers regionally, while the brewpub produced beer for its own establishment and a satellite location at 660 4th Street in Louisville. In 2015, the Main Street brewery rebranded itself as Goodwood Brewing, operating as a separate entity. Currently, the only active location of Bluegrass Brewing Company is situated at 300 West Main Street.

== Awards ==
The brewery regularly competes in the Great American Beer Festival, and its beers have won a number of awards including multiple gold medals for the Bearded Pat's Barleywine, a gold medal in 2003 for its smoked beer "Black Silk" and a bronze medal, also in 2003, for its Dortmunder-style lager beer, and most recently in 2008 for Kick in the Baltic Porter.
