= Odell Brewing Company =

Independent craft brewery in Fort Collins, Colorado

- Industry: Craft Beer and Brewing
- Founded: 1989
- Founder: Doug, Wynne and Corkie Odell
- Headquarters: Fort Collins, Colorado
- Number of employees: 108
- Website: http://odellbrewing.com/

Odell Brewing Company is an independent craft brewery in Fort Collins, Colorado. It's the 23rd largest U.S. craft brewing company by the Brewers Association (based on 2018 beer sales volume). Odell Brewing is known for their hop-forward and balanced IPAs.

== History ==
Odell was founded in 1989 by Doug, Wynne, and Corkie Odell in a converted 1915 grain elevator located on the outskirts of downtown Fort Collins. It was the second packaging craft brewery to open in Colorado, and the first in Fort Collins.

Starting in his kitchen in Los Angeles, Doug Odell had spent ten years refining recipes and playing with brewing processes until he settled on the brewery's first two recipes, although not yet the names – 90 Shilling and Easy Street Wheat. After brewing and kegging his beer, Odell would deliver it, pick up empties, and make sales calls out of his old mustard-colored Datsun pickup.

In 1994 the brewery constructed a 8,000-square-foot (740 m^{2}) building and brewed 8,300 barrels of beer. In 1996, Odell Brewing amended its draft-only commitment and added a bottling line to start packaging six packs. Numerous small expansions ensued. In 2009, the brewery again expanded, doubling its plant size to 45,000 square feet (4,200 m^{2}) and increasing its beer sold to 45,000 barrels. In 2013, a new brew house was added, the taproom was remodeled, and the Backyard patio was added. In 2015, a canning line and an expanded keg line was also added. Odell Brewing is projected to sell 125,000 barrels in 2017, with the capacity to brew more than 150,000 barrels a year. Most recently, 16 400-barrel fermentation tanks were added to the existing brewery.

In 2014, Odell Brewing Co. celebrated 25 years as a craft brewery. Week-long festivities included a Silver Lining Soiree, Oktoberfest celebration, and Cellar Series release of 180 Shilling. Odell Brewing also teamed up with Boulevard Brewing Company to release Silver Anniversary Ale, a collaboration commemorating both brewery's 25th anniversaries, just one day apart.

In July 2015, Odell Brewing Co. launched an employee stock ownership program in order to ensure the future independence of the brewery. Family members Doug, Wynne and Corkie Odell sold 51 percent of the stock to three senior executives of the brewery. Another 19 percent was sold to a newly created employee stock ownership plan shared by all company workers. The three Odells each retained 10 percent of the stock.

In 2018, Odell Brewing Co. employed 135 co-workers and distributes in 19 states. In 2019, it was ranked the 23rd largest U.S. craft brewing company by the Brewers Association (based on 2018 beer sales volume), and ranked the 33rd largest overall U.S. brewing company.

== Distribution ==
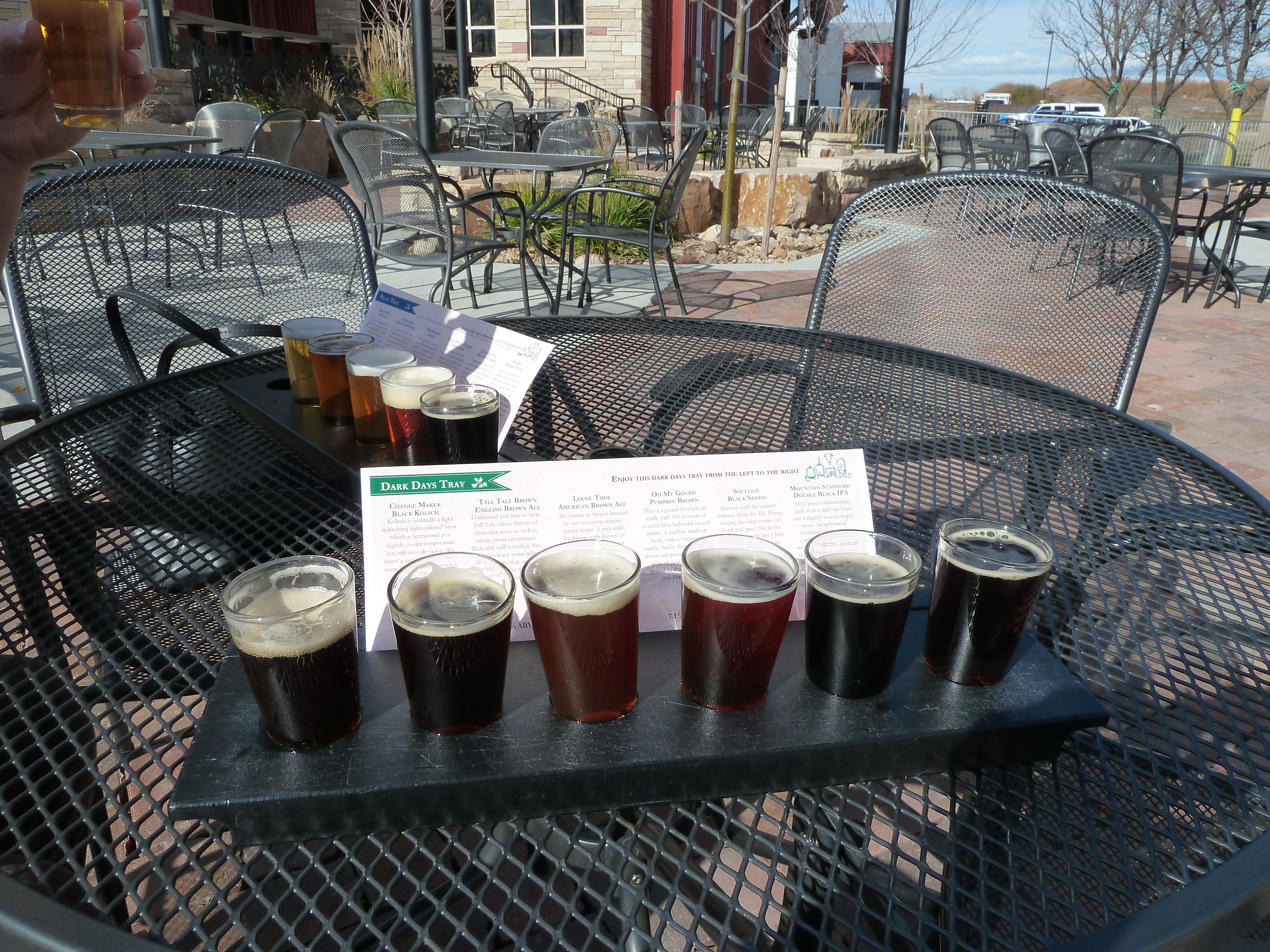
Tasting flights

Odell beer is found in the following states:

- Arizona
- Colorado
- Idaho
- Illinois
- Iowa
- Kansas
- Minnesota
- Missouri
- Montana
- Nebraska
- Nevada
- New Mexico
- North Dakota
- Oklahoma
- South Dakota
- Texas
- Utah
- Wisconsin
- Wyoming

== Philanthropy ==
Odell Brewing Company regularly contributes to charitable programs in the serving area, and engages co-workers in philanthropic efforts. The charitable program is managed by a co-worker team that meets quarterly to choose which agencies to support. Odell Outreach is an extension of the brewery's charitable giving program that enlists co-workers, family and friends to participate in volunteer activities throughout the community.

The Charity of the Month program allocates a percentage of taproom proceeds to non-profit organizations serving environmental, educational or humanitarian causes. The Tasting Room donation averages $1,200 each month to the chosen charity. Charities are chosen by an employee-led charitable committee, which oversees the disbursement of all charitable contributions and beer donations. In recognition of its continued community contributions, Odell Brewing was awarded the Outstanding Small Business Philanthropy award from the State of Colorado in 2004.

== Sustainability ==
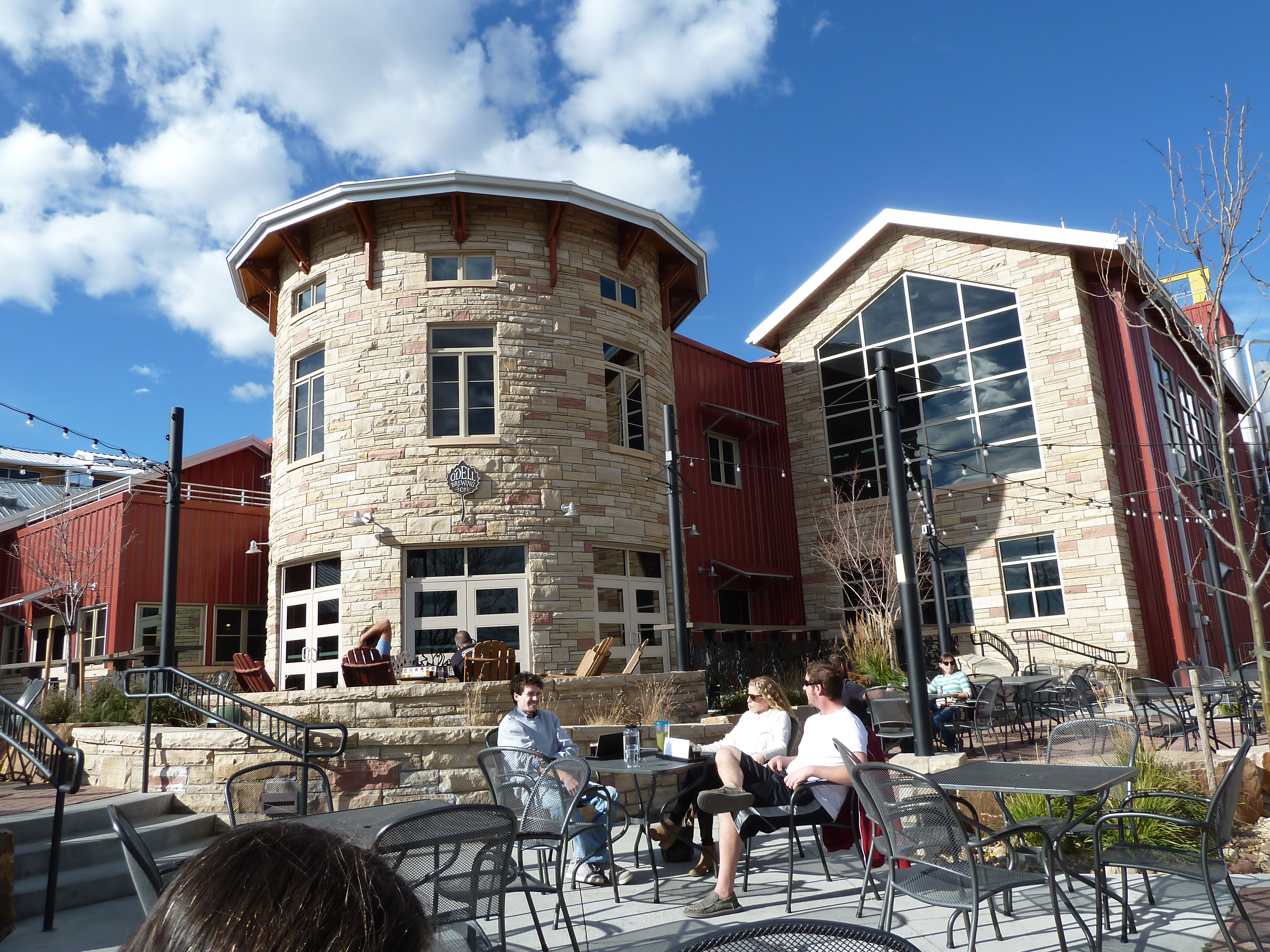
Outdoor tasting area

In 2009, a 76 kW solar array was placed on the warehouse roof. In 2014, the brewery employed a full-time sustainability coordinator to work with the city of Fort Collins and continue the goal of making Odell Brewing Co. a zero-landfill brewery by 2025. Recycling/compost bins/diversion stations are located throughout the brewery, and all spent grain, hops and yeast feed local dairy cows. The sustainability coordinator is currently working with the City of Fort Collins Wastewater Treatment Plant to see if spent yeast can be used to reduce nitrogen and phosphorus in the municipality waste water without using chemicals. Also, in comparison with the industry average of 5 gallons of water per gallon of beer brewed, Odell Brewing Co. utilizes under 3.2 gallons of water per gallon of beer brewed, saving Fort Collins and themselves at least 1.5 million gallons of water annually. The brewery was awarded the Fort Collins Chamber Small Business Sustainability Award in 2009 and 2013.

== Awards ==
90 Shilling

- Gold, German Style Alt Bier, 2016 World Beer Cup
- Bronze, English-Style Brown, 2006 Los Angeles County Fair
- Bronze, American Amber Ale, 1991 Great American Beer Festival
- Gold, German Style Alt, 2016 World Beer Cup

IPA

- Gold Medal, American-Style India Pale Ale, 2007 Great American Beer Festival
- Gold Medal, American-Style India Pale Ale, 2008 World Beer Cup
- Silver Medal, American-Style India Pale Ale, 2007 North American Beer Awards

Drumroll Hazy Pale Ale

- Silver, New Style Pale Ale, 2017 European Beer Star

Mountain Standard IPA

- Silver, Australian-Style Pale Ale, 2019 Great American Beer Festival

Easy Street Wheat

- Gold, American-Style Hefeweizen, 1993 and 2005, Great American Beer Festival
- Bronze, American Wheat Beer, 2006, Los Angeles County Fair

5 Barrel Pale Ale

- Gold, Classic English-Style Pale Ale, 2006 and 2013, Great American Beer Festival
- Silver, Classic English-Style Pale Ale, 2005 and 2006, Los Angeles County Fair
- Silver, Classic English-Style Pale Ale, 2005 Great American Beer Festival

Cutthroat Porter

- Bronze, Brown Porter, 2005 and 2006, Los Angeles County Fair
- Gold, Porter/Stout, 2005 Stockholm Beer & Whiskey Festival

Runoff Red

- Gold, American Style Red Ale, 2014 World Beer Cup

Levity Amber Ale

- Silver, Best Bitter, 2005 and 2006, Los Angeles County Fair

Friek

- Bronze, Belgian Style Lambic, 2018 European Beer Star
- Silver, Belgian Style Fruited Sour, 2017 European Beer Star
- Gold Medal, Wood- and Barrel-Aged Sour Beer. 2011 Great American Beer Festival.

"Extra Special Red"

- Bronze Medal, Imperial or Double Red Ale, 2007 Great American Beer Festival.

"Curmudgeons Nip"

- Bronze Medal, Old Ale/Strong Ale, 1998 and 2006, Great American Beer Festival.

Three of their beers have been included in the book 1001 Beers You Must Try Before You Die: 5 Barrel Pale Ale, Cutthroat Porter, and Odell IPA.

== See also ==
- Barrel-aged beer
