= Brasserie Saint James =

US brewpub in Reno NV

- Company type: Private
- Industry: Alcoholic beverage; Restaurant
- Founded: 2012
- Founder: Art Farley
- Headquarters: Reno, NV, United States
- Number of locations: 1
- Key people: Deane Albright; Joel Rasmus; Josh Watterson
- Products: Beer
- Owner: Deane Albright (50%); Joel Rasmus (50%)
- Website: brasseriesaintjames.com

Brasserie Saint James is a brewpub in Reno, Nevada. The restaurant opened to the public on October 17, 2012 on the site of an old icehouse with its own water supply. Over one hundred emptied wine barrels are kept for maturing their beers.

== Awards and Recognitions ==
In 2014, the Brasserie was named Great American Beer Festival's Mid-Size Brewpub of the Year.

- 2013 U.S. Beer Championships Gold Medal "French Biere De Garde" - Red Headed Stranger
- 2013 North American Beer Awards Bronze Medal “Bohemian Pilsner" - The Pils 2013 North American Beer Awards Bronze Medal “Belgian Dubbel” - Maquis 6
- 2014 U.S. Beer Championships Gold Medal "Belgian Tripel" - The Third Man
- 2014 U.S. Beer Championships Silver Medal “Smoked Beer" - Bamberg Rauchbier
- 2014 North American Beer Awards Silver Medal “Barrel Aged Beer" - Sophia D'oren
- 2014 The United States Beer Tasting Championships Honorable Mention "Barrel Aged Beer" - Sophia D'oren
- 2014 The United States Beer Tasting Championships Best of the Rockies-Southwest “Sour Beer" - Sophia D'oren
- 2014 The United States Beer Tasting Championships Honorable Mention "Belgian Style Ale" - Quadrophobia
- 2014 Great American Beer Festival Gold Medal “French & Belgian Saison" - Daily Wages
- 2014 Great American Beer Festival Best Midsize Brewpub - Brasserie Saint James
- 2014 Great American Beer Festival Best Midsize Brewpub Brewers - Josh Watterson & Matt Watterson
- 2014 The United States Beer Tasting Championships Best of the Rockies-Southwest "Porter" - Jamison's Station
- 2015 Best of Craft Beer Awards Gold Medal “French & Belgian Saison" - Daily Wages
- 2015 Best of Craft Beer Awards Silver Medal “French Bier De Garde” - Red Headed Stranger
- 2015 U.S. Beer Championships Bronze Medal “French/Belgian Ale" - Red Headed Stranger
- 2015 U.S. Beer Championships Silver Medal “Belgian Lambic" - Plum Lambic
- 2015 LA International Beer Competition Gold Medal “Belgian Style Abbey Ale" - Third Man
- 2015 LA International Beer Competition Gold Medal “French and Belgian Saison"- Daily Wages
- 2015 LA International Beer Competition Bronze Medal “Dortmunder or German Oktoberfest"-Oktoberfest
- 2015 LA International Beer Competition Bronze Medal “Belgian Style Lambic" - Lambic Grand Cru
- 2015 LA International Beer Competition Honorable Mention "Experimental Beer" - White Downs
- 2015 North American Beer Awards Gold Medal "Other Belgian Style Ales" - 1904
- 2015 North American Beer Awards Gold Medal “Lambic" - Lambic Grand Cru
- 2015 The United States Beer Tasting Championships Best of the Rockies-Southwest "Fruit Beer" - Plum Lambic
- 2015 Great American Beer Festival Silver Medal “French & Belgian Saison" - Daily Wages
- 2016 Best of Craft Beer Awards Bronze Medal “Belgian Strong Golden Ale" - Third Man
- 2016 Best of Craft Beer Awards Gold Medal “Specialty Wood Aged Beer" - 1904
- 2016 LA International Beer Competition Silver Medal “German Style Kolsch” – The Koln Concert
- 2016 LA International Beer Competition Bronze Medal “Belgian Style Lambic" - Lambic Grand Cru
- 2016 San Diego International Beer Competition Silver Medal “French & Belgian Style Saison" - Daily Wages
- 2016 U.S. Beer Championships Gold Medal "Sour/Belgian Lambic" - Lambic Grand Cru
- 2016 U.S. Beer Championships Silver Medal “French/Belgian Saison" - Daily Wages
- 2016 U.S. Beer Championships Silver Medal “Belgian Style Fruit Beer” – Plum Lambic
- 2017 Best of Craft Beer Awards Gold Medal “Belgian and French Saison" - Daily Wages
- 2017 Best of Craft Beer Awards Silver Medal "Belgian Style Lambic" - Lambic Grand Cru
- 2017 U.S. Beer Championship Gold Medal "Belgian-style Tripel” – Third Man
- 2017 U.S. Beer Championship Silver Medal “Brett Beer" - 1904
- 2018 Best of Craft Beer Awards Bronze Medal “American Origin Lager Style” - Santiago
- 2018 Best of Craft Beer Awards Gold Medal “Belgian Style Lambic" - Lambic Grand Cru
- 2018 U.S. Beer Championship Gold Medal “Belgian Quadrupel” - Quadrophobia

== Other Accolades ==
- Men's Journal top 100 beers 2014 Daily Wages Saison
- Men's Journal top 100 beers 2017 Daily Wages Saison
- UNTAPPED best beer in Nevada 2016 Daily Wages
- Gayout top 12 beers in the world 2015 Red Headed Stranger

=== Beers ===
Name	Style	Honors
Daily Wages	Saison	2015 Great American Beer Festival Silver, 2014 Great American Beer Festival Gold
Rauchbier		2014 U.S. Open Beer Championship Silver
Red Headed Stranger	Red Farmhouse Ale	2013 U.S. Open Beer Championship Gold
The Third Man	Tripel	2014 U.S. Open Beer Championship Gold

== See also ==
- List of breweries in Nevada
