= Auburn Alehouse =

Brewery in Auburn, California, USA

- Interactive map of Auburn Alehouse
- Location: 289 Washington Street, Auburn, California, United States
- Coordinates: 38.89534°N 121.07849°W
- Opened: June 21, 2007
- Annual production volume: 1,870 US beer barrels (2,190 hL)
- Owned by: Brian Ford; Lisa Ford
- Website: Official website

Active beers
Name	Type
Gold Country Pilsner	Pilsner
Gold Digger IPA	India Pale Ale
Fool's Gold Ale	Pale ale
Auburn Export Lager	Lager
PU 240 Imperial IPA	India Pale Ale
American River Pale Ale	Pale ale
Old Town Brown Ale	Brown ale
Shanghai Stout	Stout

Seasonal beers
Name	Type
Old Prospector Barleywine-Style Ale	Barley wine
McFord's Irish Red Ale	Irish red ale
Miner's Wheat	Wheat
Rye Not?	Rye beer
Oktoberfest Marzen	Märzen
Irish Dry Stout	Irish stout

Auburn Alehouse is a brewery and restaurant located in the Old Town neighborhood of Auburn, California in the United States.

== History ==
Auburn Alehouse was co-founded by Brian and Lisa Ford. Brian Ford started making beer by homebrewing. Ford then took classes through the American Brewers Guild in fermentation science and engineering. Ford interned at Rubicon Brewing Company. He opened Crawford Brewing Company in 1997. The brewery relocated to Nevada City, California and was renamed Stonehouse. He quit working there in 1999 and Beermann's in Roseville, California. He also opened their location in Lincoln, California. He quit working for that company in 2003. He started working in construction. He had intentions to open another brewery and worked on the plans for Auburn Alehouse, which opened in 2007. The brewery also has a restaurant.

The brewery and restaurant are located in the American Block Building, which was the Shanghai Restaurant prior to becoming a brewery. When it was the Shanghai, portions of the movie Phenomenon were filmed there. The restaurant serves pub food. It has been featured in the Placer Herald, The Union, KTXL and Sacramento.

== Beer ==
In 2013, Auburn Alehouse produced 1,870 barrels of beer. They make a Pilsner which Ford calls a "Pre-Prohibition style Pilsner". They make a seasonal barley wine, called Old Prospector, that uses wine from Dono dal Cielo.

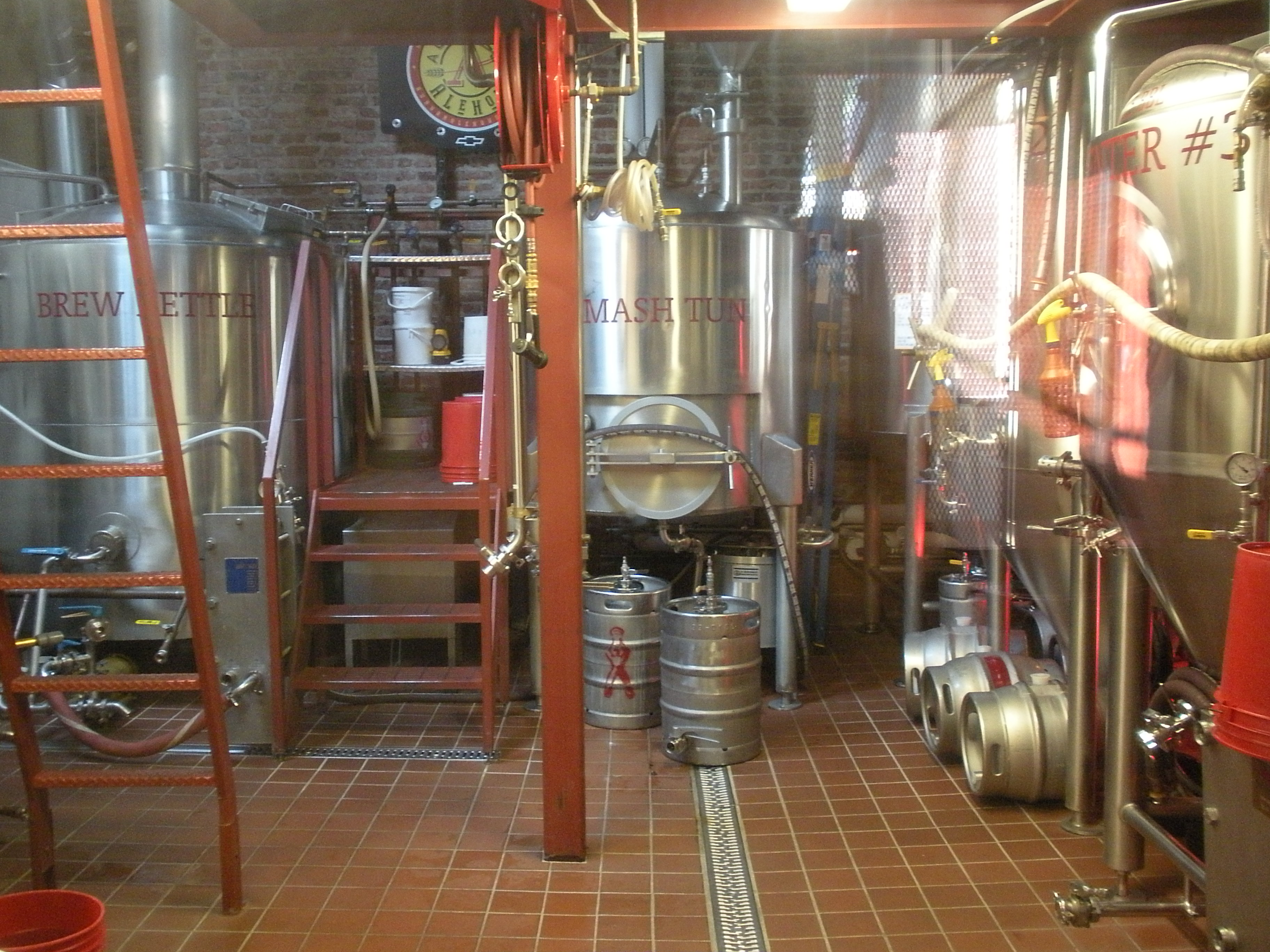
The Auburn Alehouse brewery

== Awards ==
Name	Style	Honors
Gold Digger IPA	American-Style India Pale Ale	2017 Great American Beer Festival Silver
Hop Donkey	Double Red Ale	2017 Great American Beer Festival Gold
Old Town Brown	English-Style Mild Ale	2016 Great American Beer Festival Bronze
Hop Donkey Imperial Red Ale	Imperial Red Ale	2014 Great American Beer Festival Silver
Gold Country Pilsner	Pilsner	2013 Great American Beer Festival Bronze
Gold Country Pilsner	Pilsner	2012 Great American Beer Festival Gold
Gold Country Pilsner	Pilsner	2011 Great American Beer Festival Bronze
