= Boundary Bay Brewing Company =

Brewery in Bellingham, Washington

- Industry: Alcoholic beverage
- Founded: 1995
- Headquarters: Bellingham, Washington, United States
- Products: Beer
- Owners: Janet Lightner and Ed Bennett

The Boundary Bay Brewing Company, also known as the Boundary Bay Brewery & Bistro, was a brewery and brewpub in Bellingham, Washington, USA.

== History ==
The brewery was founded by Ed Bennett. Bennet earned dual master's degrees in finance and wine chemistry and studied brewing at the University of California, Davis. In 1994, Bennet leased and remodeled an old transit company station building that was originally constructed in 1992. There, the brewery opened in 1995.

The brewery is named after Boundary Bay, a bay north of Bellingham that is partially Canadian and partially American territory. During prohibition, rum-runners and bootleggers crossed illegal alcohol into the States through this unique geological feature.

On September 20th, 2025, Boundary Bay closed permanently, marking the closure of the longest-running brewery in the city. The business hosted an all-day block party to commemorate.

== Awards and recognition ==
In 2008, Boundary Bay Brewery was the nation's largest brewpub based on number of barrels sold according to The New Brewer, a publication of the Brewers Association. In 2015, Boundary Bay Brewery was the largest brewpub in Washington state and the 10th largest in the nation.

Boundary Bay Brewing Company has won numerous awards in national and international beer competitions.

== See also ==
- Beer in the United States
