= Peticolas Brewing Company =

Craft brewer

Peticolas Brewing Company is a craft brewer located in the Design District of Dallas, Texas. Founded by Michael Peticolas in 2011, it was one of the first two breweries to open in Dallas.

Peticolas was named the Grand National Champion at the U.S. Open Beer Championship in 2018. The same year, it ranked as the 44th-fastest growing inner-city company on the Fortune Inner City 100.

The company and its founder have been active in advocating for changing Texas' alcohol distribution laws.
