= Squatters Pub =

Bar and restaurant chain in the U.S. state of Utah

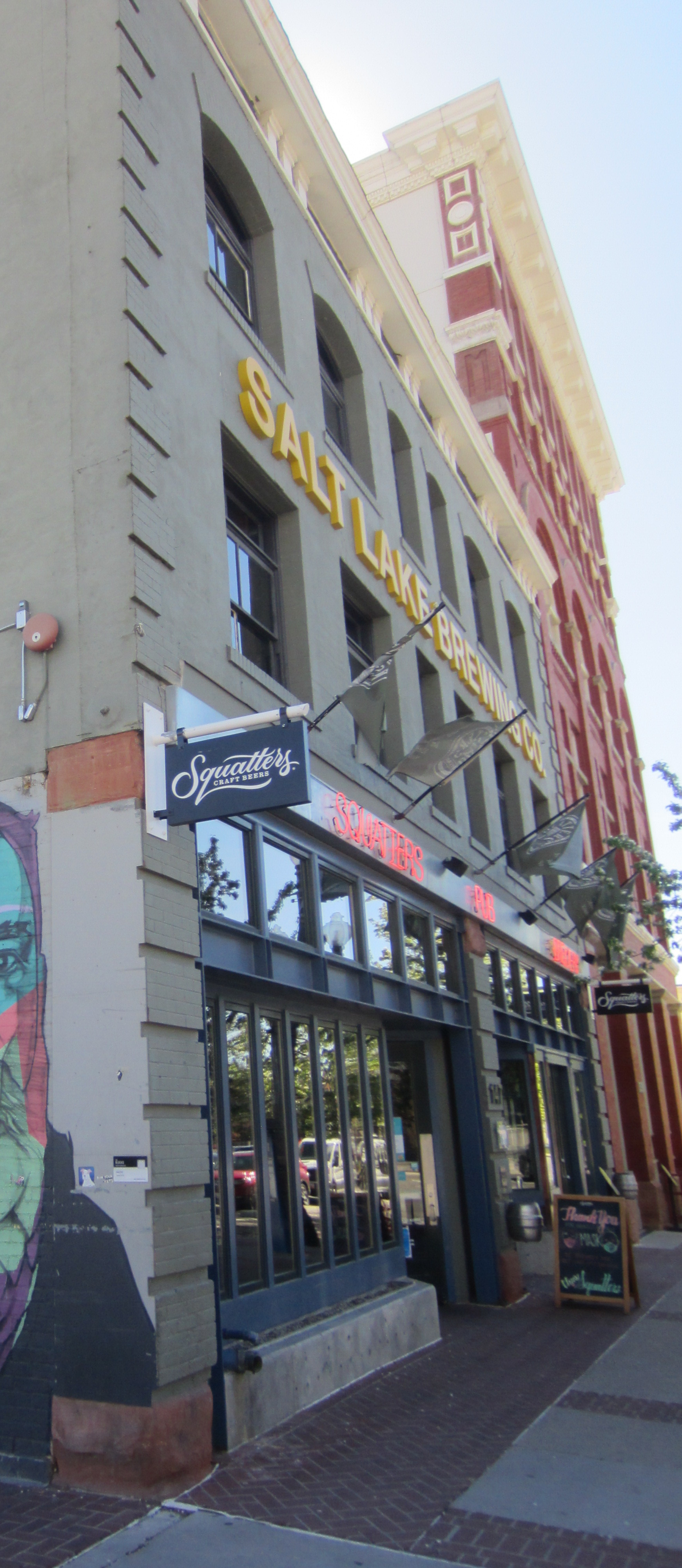
- The downtown Salt Lake City pub's exterior in 2021
- Interactive map of Squatters Pub

Restaurant information
- Coordinates: 40.76261°N 111.89569°W

Squatters Pub is a bar and restaurant with multiple locations in the U.S. state of Utah. Locations include Downtown Salt Lake City, Salt Lake International Airport, and Park City. The original location in Salt Lake City opened in 1989.

== History ==
The business was eventually acquired by Fireman Capital Partners and integrated into the CANarchy brand alongside several other notable regional craft brewers. In 2022 CANarchy was purchased for $330 million by Monster Beverage Corporation.

As part of the deal, the brewpub locations in Utah were brought back under local control, and now operate under the brand name, Salt Lake Brewing Company. The eight locations continue to pour beer bearing the Squatters and Wasatch names.
