= Atlanta Brewing Company =

Brewery in Atlanta, Georgia

Coordinates: 33.818452°N 84.434607°W

- Location: Atlanta, Georgia

Active beers
Name	Type
Red Brick Peachtree Pale Ale	Pale Ale
Red Brick Brown Ale	Brown Ale
Red Brick Blonde	Blonde Ale
Red Brick Porter	Porter
Number's Ale	American Bitter
Laughing Skull	Amber Ale
Beard Envy	Barley Wine
Divine Bovine Chai Spice Milk Stout	Stout
Hoplanta	India Pale Ale

Seasonal beers
Name	Type
Red Brick Spring Helluva Bock	Bock
Red Brick Summer Hefe-weizen	Hefeweizen
Red Brick Winter	Belgian Dark

Atlanta Brewing Company, named Red Brick Brewing Company from 2010–2018, was Georgia's oldest brewery, located in Atlanta, Georgia.

== History ==
Atlanta Brewing Company was founded in 1993 by Greg Kelly, a former Guinness executive. The original brewery, a converted old brick warehouse, was located at 1219 Williams Street. Pine-sided vats and cold tanks from England were purchased, and the beer was produced using an older traditional style of brewing. The large red malt mill, still used by the brewery today, was found sitting abandoned in a meadow in England. After being shipped to Atlanta and undergoing extensive refurbishing, the mill was put to work readying the grain for brewing.

Atlanta Brewing Company produced 4,000 barrels of beer in 1994, the first year of production. To maintain this initial demand, the brewery brewed once or twice a day. Peachtree Pale Ale, Spring Brew, Summer Brew, Winter Brew, Golden Lager, and Kelly's Light were added to the line-up in the early years.

In 2005, Bob Budd was brought on by the brewery's investors as a management consultant. In 2006, Greg Kelly left Atlanta Brewing Company and Bob became president.

As of February 2016, the brewery's beers are also available in Germany.

=== Company name ===
Atlanta Brewing Company's former logo

The name "Red Brick Ale" was given to the brewery's flagship beer. One suggested (but ultimately discarded) name for the first beer was "John J. Bips Ale", named after a long-term brewmaster at the historic Atlantic Brewery.

In 2010, Atlanta Brewing Company changed its public name to Red Brick Brewing Company. Brewery legend has it that the name came from their original Red Brick Ale, which was inspired by a historic speech. Atlanta's mayor supposedly gave a speech shortly after General Sherman torched the city in the Civil War. He stated that the city would "rise from the ashes like a phoenix and be rebuilt one red brick at a time".

In August 2018 the brewery returned to its former name of Atlanta Brewing Company.

Atlanta Brewing Company is currently owned by Alton Shields who bought the company in January 2023.

== Collaborations ==
Among the various collaboration projects of 1996, Atlanta Brewing Company partnered with a Belgian brewery to release a Belgian beer called "Malone's". The beer was produced in Belgium, pasteurized, and then shipped in a large tanker truck. Upon arriving in the United States via ship, the tanker was driven to the brewery, and the beer was pumped into a holding tank. This imported beer was then carbonated and bottled for distribution. Surprisingly, two out of three batches survived the trip in drinkable condition.

In 1997, Atlanta Brewing Company brewed Old Testy Coffee Stout for the Sandy Springs Taco Mac location. But the brewery's most notable and lasting partnership is with the Vortex Bar and Grill, a two-location Atlanta institution. The beer's name and label features the Vortex's iconic "Laughing Skull" logo. The original incarnation was a full-bodied bohemian pilsner, which was dry hopped and lagered for sixty days before shipping.

=== Beers ===
Brews include Hoplanta India Pale Ale, Laughing Skull Amber Ale, Hop Circle India Session Ale, Dog Days Hefeweizen, A-Town Brown Ale, and Divine Bovine Chai Milk Stout. Additionally, they have created the high end "Brick Mason" Series, which includes a variety of one-off high gravity beers, and frequently highlights the brewery's barrel aging program.

In 2007 ABC moved from their Williams Street location overlooking the Downtown Connector in Midtown Atlanta to 2323 Defoor Hills Rd.

In 2009, ABC released the newest version of Laughing Skull, changing it from a bohemian pilsner to a well-balanced amber ale. By the beginning of 2012, it had become their best selling beer, while Red Brick Brown, Blonde, Pale Ale, and Porter were the four standard offerings at the brewery. Inspired by the success of their barrel aged 15th Anniversary Ale, they began producing limited release beers under the Brick Mason series name in special four-packs.

In 2013 a new brewing team took over operations and began experimenting with bold ingredients and flavors. The brewery introduced new packaging to reflect their new direction. Products like Hoplanta IPA, Divine Bovine (formerly called Sacred Cow) Chai Milk Stout, Hop Circle India Session Ale, A-Town Brown, and Dog Days Ale have replaced the seasonal beers of the past.

== See also ==
- Barrel-aged beer
