= World Beer Cup =

International beer competition

Beer World Cup logo

The World Beer Cup is an international beer competition organized by the Brewers Association, a trade group representing America's small and independent craft brewers. It is the largest competition in the beer industry and has been described as "the Olympics of beer." According to americancraftbeer.com, "Winning a World Beer Cup is like winning a Grammy or an Oscar…it brings the world’s attention to even the smallest brewery’s doorstep…and like a hit song or film, it can make a career." The cup was founded by Association of Brewers president Charlie Papazian in 1996 and was awarded every two years until 2022, and has been held every year since then. The competition is held in conjunction with the Craft Brewers Conference & BrewExpo America.

== Competition and judging ==
According to the World Beer Cup, "all entries must be commercially available, fermented malt beverages, conforming to the trade understanding of “beer”, brewed by a permitted commercial brewery. “Commercially available” means available for sale at retail at the time of registration." For the 2016 World Beer Cup, the entry fee was $160 per beer, in addition to a $160 application fee.

Awards are given in more than 100 categories. Up to three awards - gold, silver, and bronze - may be awarded in any category, but sometimes not all three awards are given, depending on how the judges evaluate the entires. If they determine that no beer qualifies for a gold award, they may give out just silver and bronze medals. They may even give no awards at all, if all the entries are determined to be unsuited to the style of that category or to be unworthy of an award.

== Recent World Beer Cup events ==
In 2016 there were 6,596 beers from 1,907 breweries from 55 countries. Entries were judged by an international panel of 253 judges from 31 countries. In 2018 there were 8,234 beers entered, a 25% increase over the 2016 cup and the largest field in the competition's history, with competitors from 66 countries. There were 295 judges, three-fourths of them from outside the United States.

== Brewery awards ==
=== Champion Brewery (Very Small) ===
Year	Brewery	Brew Master	City	State	Country
2016	Arch Rock Brewing Co.	James Smith	Gold Beach	Oregon	USA

=== Champion Brewery (Small) ===
Year	Brewery	Brew Master	City	State	Country
2004	Oggi's Pizza and Brewing Company	Tom Nickel	San Clemente	California	USA
2006	Brauerei Michael Plank	Michael Plank	Laaber	Bavaria	Germany
2008	Port Brewing Company and Lost Abbey	Tomme Arthur	San Marcos	California	USA
2010	Ballast Point Brewing Company	Ballast Point Brewers	San Diego	California	USA
2012	Brauerei Michael Plank	Michael Plank	Laaber	Bavaria	Germany
2014	Pelican Brewery	Darron Welch, Steve Panos	Pacific City	Oregon	USA
2016	Noble Ale Works	Evan & The Giants	Anaheim	California	USA

=== Champion Brewery (Medium) ===
Year	Brewery	Brew Master	City	State	Country
2004	Firestone Walker Fine Ales	Matthew Brynildson	Paso Robles	California	USA
2006	Firestone Walker Fine Ales	Matthew Brynildson	Paso Robles	California	USA
2008	Privatbrauerei Hoepfner	Peter Bucher	Karlsruhe	Baden-Württemberg	Germany
2010	Firestone Walker Brewing Company	Matthew Brynildson	Paso Robles	California	USA
2012	Firestone Walker Brewing Company	Matthew Brynildson	Paso Robles	California	USA
2014	Coronado Brewing Company		Coronado	California	USA
2016	Brewery Ommegang	Brewery Ommegang	Cooperstown	New York	USA

=== Champion Brewery (Large) ===
Year	Brewery	Brew Master	City	State	Country
2004	Miller Brewing Company	Dr. David S. Ryder	Milwaukee	Wisconsin	USA
2006	Miller Brewing Company	Dr. David S. Ryder	Milwaukee	Wisconsin	USA
2008	Blue Moon Brewing Company	Warren Quilliam	Golden	Colorado	USA
2010	Asia Pacific Breweries Limited	APB Brewing Team			Singapore
2012	AB InBev	Claudio Ferro	Leuven	Vlaams-Brabant	Belgium
2014	Coors Brewing Company	Dr. David Ryder	Golden	Colorado	USA
2016	Miller Brewing Co.	Miller Brewing Co. Brewing Team	Milwaukee	Wisconsin	USA

=== Champion Brewpub (Small) ===
Year	Brewery	Brew Master	City	State	Country
2004	Laurelwood Pub & Brewery	Christian Ettinger	Portland	Oregon	USA
2006	Piece Brewery	Jonathan Cutler	Chicago	Illinois	USA
2008	Bend Brewing Company	Tonya Cornett	Bend	Oregon	USA
2010	Devils Backbone Brewing Company	Jason Oliver	Roseland	Virginia	USA
2012	Iron Hill Brewery & Restaurant	Iron Hill Brewery Team	Media	Pennsylvania	USA
2014	Iron Hill Brewery & Restaurant	Iron Hill Brewery Team	Media	Pennsylvania	USA
2016	12Degree Brewing	Jon Howland & Tor O’Brien	Louisville	Colorado	USA

=== Champion Brewpub (Large) ===
Year	Brewery	Brew Master	City	State	Country
2004	Russian River Brewing Company	Vinnie Cilurzo	Santa Rosa	California	USA
2006	Russian River Brewing Company	Vinnie Cilurzo	Santa Rosa	California	USA
2010	Iron Hill Brewery	Iron Hill Brewery Team	Wilmington	Delaware	USA
2012	Pelican Pub & Brewery	Darron R S Welch	Pacific City	Oregon	USA
2014	Blind Tiger Brewery & Restaurant	John Dean	Topeka	Kansas	USA
2016	Beachwood BBQ & Brewing	Julian Shrago, Ian McCall & Gene Wagoner	Long Beach	California	USA
