= Great American Beer Festival =

Beer event in Denver, Colorado, United States

Coordinates: 39.7392°N 104.9850°W

Location of the Great American Beer Festival in the United States.

The Great American Beer Festival (GABF) is an annual beer festival hosted by the Brewers Association, held in Denver, Colorado. Typically held in late September or early October, the event used to be held at Denver's Colorado Convention Center, but despite community pushback, it has moved outdoors to Levitt Pavillion for 2026. Established in 1982, it is the largest ticketed beer festival in the U.S. and one of the largest in the world.

== History ==
The GABF was founded by brewer Charlie Papazian, and the first festival was held in conjunction with the American Homebrewers Association's annual conference in Boulder, Colorado, in June 1982, featuring 24 participating breweries, 47 beers, and 800 attendees.

In a private event, held the week prior, judges evaluate the beers in the associated competition. They then award medals in over 100 beer style categories. In 2019, the panel consisted of 322 judges from 18 countries, who evaluated over 9,400 beers. There were 800 breweries and 4,000 beers. In 2023, 250 judges from 10 countries evaluated 9,298 entries. There were 263 breweries.

Due to the COVID-19 pandemic the 2020 and 2021 in-person festival was cancelled with a virtual event held instead.

== Statistics ==
For a list of all medalists, see the List of Great American Beer Festival medalists

=== 2004 ===
- Attendance - 28,000
- Breweries at the festival - 334
- Beers at the festival - 1,454
- Breweries in the competition - 398
- Beers in the competition - 2,016
- Medals awarded - 201

=== 2005 ===
- Attendance - 29,500
- Breweries at the festival - 377
- Beers at the festival - 1,672
- Breweries in the competition - 466
- Beers in the competition - 2,335
- Category with most entries - American-style India Pale Ale: 103
- Medals awarded - 206

=== 2006 ===
- Attendance - 41,000
- Breweries at the festival - 384
- Beers at the festival - 1,668
- Breweries in the competition - 450
- Beers in the competition - 2,402
- Category with most entries - American-style India Pale Ale: 94
- Medals awarded - 203

=== 2007 ===
- Attendance - 46,000
- Breweries at the festival - 408
- Beers at the festival - 1,884
- Breweries in the competition - 473
- Beers in the competition - 2,973
- Category with most entries - American-style India Pale Ale: 120
- Medals awarded - 222 + 3 in Pro-Am

=== 2008 ===
- Attendance - 46,000
- Breweries at the festival - 432
- Beers at the festival - 2,052
- Breweries in the competition - 472
- Beers in the competition - 2,902
- Category with most entries - American-style India Pale Ale: 106
- Medals awarded - 222 + 3 in Pro-Am

=== 2009 ===
- Attendance - 49,576
- Breweries at the festival - 457
- Beers at the festival - 2,100
- Breweries in the competition - 495
- Beers in the competition - 3,308
- Category with the most entries - American-style India Pale Ale, 134 entries
- Medals awarded - 234 + 3 in Pro-Am

=== 2010 ===
- Attendance - 49,000
- Breweries at the festival - 455
- Beers at the festival - 2,248
- Beers in the competition - 3,523
- Category with the most entries - American-style India Pale Ale, 150 entries
- Medals awarded - 236 + 3 in Pro-Am

=== 2011 ===
- Attendance - 49,000
- Breweries at the festival - 466
- Beers at the festival - 2,375
- Breweries in the competition - 526
- Beers in the competition - 3,930
- Category with the most entries - American-style India Pale Ale, 176 entries
- Medals awarded - 248 + 3 in Pro-Am

=== 2012 ===
- Attendance - 49,000
- Breweries at the festival - 578
- Beers at the festival - 2,774
- Breweries in the competition - 666
- Beers in the competition - 4,338
- Medals awarded - 254

=== 2013 ===
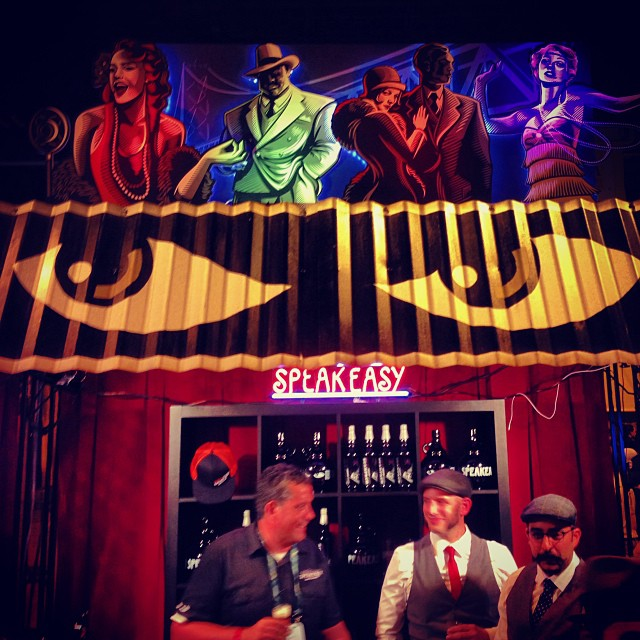
The winning booth at the Great American Beer Festival 2013

- Attendance - 49,000
- Breweries at the festival - 624
- Beers at the festival - 3,142
- Breweries in the competition - 732
- Beers in the competition - 4,809
- Beer categories - 84
- Category with most entries - American-Style India Pale Ale, 252
- Medals awarded - 254

=== 2014 ===
- Attendance - 49,000
- Breweries at the festival - 710
- Beers at the festival - 3,500+
- Breweries in the competition - 1,309
- Beers in the competition - 5,507

=== 2015 ===
- Attendance - 60,000
- Breweries at the festival - 750
- Beers at the festival - 3,800
- Breweries in the competition - 1,552
- Beers in the competition - 6,647

=== 2016 ===
- Attendance - 60,000
- Breweries at the festival - 780
- Beers at the festival - 3,800+
- Breweries in the competition - 1,752
- Beers in the competition - 7,227
- Beer categories - 96
- Category with most entries - American-Style India Pale Ale, 312
- Medals awarded - 286

=== 2017 ===
- Attendance - 60,000
- Breweries at the festival - 800+
- Beers at the festival - 3,900+
- Breweries in the competition - 2,217
- Beers in the competition - 7,923
- Beer categories -

=== 2018 ===
- Attendance - 62,000
- Breweries at the festival - 800+
- Beers at the festival - 4,000+
- Breweries in the competition - 2,404
- Beers in the competition - 8,496

=== 2019 ===
- Attendance - 65,000+
- Breweries at the festival - 800+
- Beers at the festival - 4,000+
- Breweries in the competition - 2,295
- Beers in the competition - 9,497
- Beer categories - 107
- Category with most entries - Juicy or Hazy IPA, 348 entries
- Medals awarded - 318

=== 2022 ===
- Attendance - 40,000
- Breweries at the festival - 500
- Beers at the festival - 2,000
- Breweries in the competition - 2,154
- Beers in the competition - 9,904 entries
- Beer categories - 98
- Category with most entries - American Style India Pale Ale, 423 entries
- Medals awarded - 300

=== 2023 ===
- Attendance - 40,000
- Breweries at the festival - 500+
- Beers at the festival -
- Breweries in the competition - 2,033
- Beers in the competition - 9,298
- Beer categories - 263
- Category with most entries - Juicy or Hazy India Pale Ale, 365 entries
- Medals awarded - 263

=== 2024 ===
- Attendance - 40,000
- Breweries at the festival - 273
- Breweries in the competition -1,869 breweries and cideries
- Beers in the competition - 8,836 commercial beer entries, 233 commercial cider entries, 95 Collaboration entries, and 52 Pro-Am entries
- Beer categories - 102
- Category with most entries - Juicy/Hazy IPA, 349 entries
- Medals awarded - 326
- Added 5 new cider categories

== See also ==
- Craft beer
