= List of breweries in Illinois =

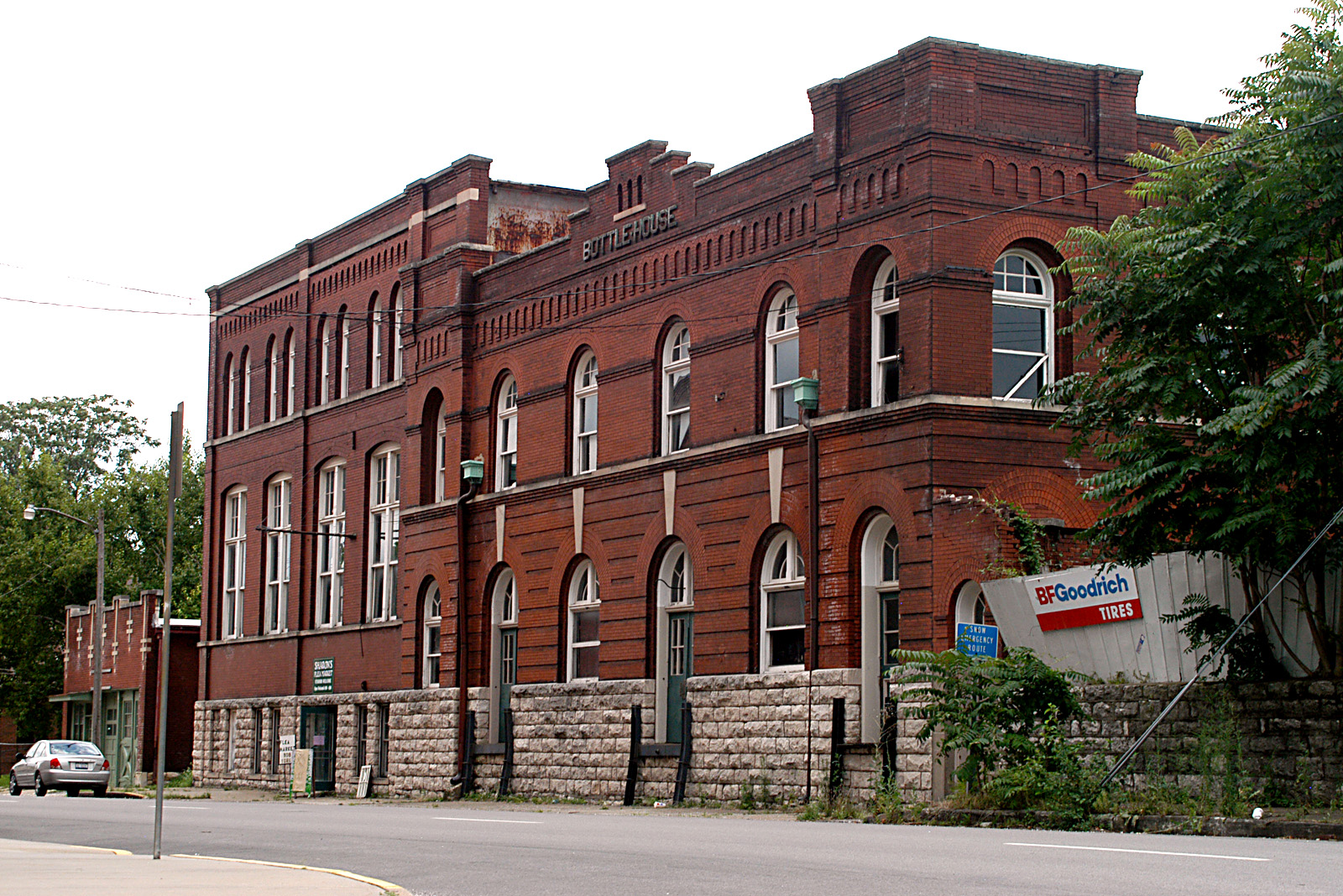
The Dick Brothers Brewery building in Quincy, Illinois

Breweries in Illinois produce a wide range of beers in different styles that are marketed locally, regionally, nationally, and internationally. Brewing companies vary widely in the volume and variety of beer produced, from small nanobreweries and microbreweries to massive multinational conglomerate macrobreweries. Illinois is the 25th most extensive and the fifth most populous of the 50 states, and is often noted as a microcosm of the entire country. With Chicago in the northeast, small industrial cities, great agricultural productivity, and natural resources like coal, timber, and petroleum in the south, Illinois has a broad economic base.

In 2012 Illinois' 83 breweries and brewpubs employed 1,300 people directly, and more than 45,000 others in related jobs such as wholesaling and retailing. Including people directly employed in brewing, as well as those who supply Illinois' breweries with everything from ingredients to machinery, the total business and personal tax revenue generated by Illinois' breweries and related industries was more than $1.4 billion. Consumer purchases of Illinois' brewery products generated almost $450 million extra in tax revenue. In 2012, according to the Brewers Association, Illinois ranked 36th in the number of craft breweries per capita with 68.

For context, at the end of 2013 there were 2,822 breweries in the United States, including 2,768 craft breweries subdivided into 1,237 brewpubs, 1,412 microbreweries and 119 regional craft breweries. In that same year, according to the Beer Institute, the brewing industry employed around 43,000 Americans in brewing and distribution and had a combined economic impact of more than $246 billion.

An analysis done in 2015 reported that Chicago craft brewers occupied more square feet of commercial real estate than those of any other U.S. city. According to the same study, Chicago had 144 craft breweries, second only to Portland, Oregon which had 196. In 2017, the Chicago Tribune reported that "the Chicago area has the most breweries in the nation, with 202 – topping Denver's 198 and Seattle's 168. The Chicago area includes small portions of Indiana and Wisconsin."

== Breweries ==
Notes:

1. For the purposes of this list, a brewpub is a taproom with a kitchen; that is, it's a restaurant as well as a brewery.
2. This list includes locations that produce cider, mead, and makgeolli. Those beverages have an alcohol content similar to that of beer, but they are fermented, not brewed. For locations that produce wine, see List of wineries in Illinois.

Name	Bottling or canning	Brewpub	Taproom	Location and other information
25 O'Clock Brewing Company	X mark		X mark	Urbana, opened in 2017, added a taprooom in 2018.
4204 Main Street Brewing Company	X mark			Belleville. The original brewpub opened in 2014. A second, larger brewery and taproom opened in 2017. The original location closed in 2021, with the production brewery and taproom remaining in operation.
5 Bines Brewery			X mark	Belvidere, opened in 2024.
93 Octane Brewery		X mark		The brewpub in St. Charles opened in 2019. The one in Elmhurst opened in 2025.
Adams Street Brewery		X mark		Opened in 2019 in the Berghoff restaurant in Chicago.
Afterthought Brewing Company	X mark		X mark	Lombard, opened in 2016. The separate taproom opened in 2021 and closed in 2024.
Alter Brewing Company	X mark	X mark	X mark	The brewery and taproom in Downers Grove opened in 2015 and added a canning line in 2017. The brewpub in St. Charles opened in 2020. The brewpub in Oak Brook opened in 2022.
Alulu		X mark		Chicago, opened in 2017.
Analytical Brewing			X mark	Lexington, opened in 2022. The taproom and restaurant in Peoria opened in 2026.
Anvil & Forge Brewing and Distilling			X mark	Springfield, opened in 2018.
Apple Knocker Hard Cider	X mark		X mark	Cider brewery in Cobden, opened in 2012.
Arrowhead Ales Brewing Company		X mark		New Lenox, opened in 2016.
Artesia Brewing			X mark	Thawville, opened in 2021.
Art History Brewing	X mark		X mark	Geneva, opened in 2020.
Bald Buddha Brewing			X mark	Springfield, opened in 2022.
Begyle Brewing Company	X mark		X mark	Chicago, opened in 2012. The taproom opened in 2015.
Bent River Brewing Company	X mark	X mark	X mark	Brewpub in Moline, bottling line and taproom in Rock Island. Founded in 1997.
Big Ben Brewing Company			X mark	Peru, opened in 2022.
Big Muddy Brewing	X mark		X mark	Murphysboro, founded in 2009.
Big Thorn Brewery	X mark		X mark	Georgetown, opened in 2016.
Bixi Beer		X mark		Chicago, opened in 2018.
BJ's Restaurant & Brewhouse		X mark		BJ's Restaurants is a chain of restaurants and brewpubs that started in Santa Ana, California in 1978. The location in Orland Park opened in 2023.
Black Horizon Brewing Company	X mark		X mark	Willowbrook, opened in 2017.
Black Lung Brewing Company	X mark	X mark	X mark	Started in 2019 as an alternating proprietorship brewing and distributing out of ZümBier in Waukegan. The brewery and taproom in Round Lake Beach opened in 2021 and closed in 2026. The brewpub in Fox Lake opened in 2023 and closed in 2026. The brewpub in Grayslake opened in 2025.
Blind Corner Brewery	X mark		X mark	Opened in 2025 as an alternating proprietorship at Go Brewing in Naperville.
Blind Pig Brewery	X mark	X mark		Champaign. The beer bar opened in 2004. The separate microbrewery and taproom opened in 2009. The brewery closed in 2023, and reopened in 2024. The brewpub opened in 2025.
Blume & Ferris Public House		X mark		Downers Grove, opened in 2026.
BrickStone Restaurant & Brewery	X mark	X mark		Bourbonnais. Added a brewery to the existing restaurant in 2006. Opened a separate production brewery in 2015.
Broken Tee Brewing Company			X mark	Highwood, opened in 2022.
Brother Chimp Brewing	X mark		X mark	The brewery and taproom in North Aurora opened in 2020 and closed in 2026. The brewery and taproom in St. Charles opened in 2025.
Brothership Brewing	X mark		X mark	Mokena, opened in 2020.
Bubblehouse Brewing Company			X mark	Lisle, opened in 2021.
BuckleDown Brewing	X mark		X mark	Lyons, opened in 2013.
Buffalo Creek Brewing			X mark	Long Grove, opened in 2017.
Burning Bush Brewery			X mark	Chicago, opened in 2020.
Bust'd Brewing			X mark	Peoria Heights, opened in 2023.
Carbondale Craft Beer	X mark		X mark	Ava, makers of Little Egypt beer, founded in 2012.
Carlyle Brewing Company	X mark		X mark	Rockford. Opened in 2003, closed in 2021, reopened in 2022, under new management in 2023.
Cary Ale House & Brewing Company		X mark		Cary. The restaurant opened in 2015. They added an in-house brewery in 2018.
Casper Brewing Company			X mark	Bloomington, opened in 2021.
Church Street Brewing Company	X mark	X mark		Itasca, opened in 2012.
Coal Creek Brewing Company			X mark	Princeton, opened in 2023.
Colden Brewery			X mark	Centralia, opened in 2025.
Corridor Brewery & Provisions	X mark	X mark		Chicago, opened in 2015. Added a canning line in 2017.
Crushed by Giants		X mark		Chicago, opened in 2020.
Crust Brewing		X mark		Rosemont, opened in 2022. The restaurant and taproom in Chicago opened in 2025.
Cruz Blanca	X mark	X mark		Founded by chef Rick Bayless in 2015. The beer originally was contract brewed. The brewpub in Chicago opened in 2016. Cruz Blanca was acquired by Molson Coors in 2024.
Crystal Lake Brewing	X mark		X mark	Crystal Lake, opened in 2014.
Decatur Brew Works			X mark	Decatur, opened in 2016.
Demo Brewing Company			X mark	Chicago, opened in 2024.
Destihl Restaurant & Brew Works	X mark	X mark	X mark	The brewpub in Normal opened in 2007, and the one in Champaign opened in 2011. The production brewery in Bloomington opened in 2013. It was replaced with a new brewery and taproom in Normal in 2017. The brewpub in Champaign closed in 2020.
District Brew Yards	X mark	X mark		Chicago, opened in 2019 as a brewery run cooperatively by three brewing companies – Burnt City Brewing, Around the Bend Beer Company, and Bold Dog Beer Company. Added a fourth company, Casa Humilde Cervecería Artesanal, later that year. In 2022 Bold Dog left, and Twisted Hippo Brewing joined after their own brewpub was destroyed in a fire. A second location in Wheeling opened 2022 and closed in 2025.
Door 4 Brewing Company			X mark	Decatur, opened in 2017.
Double Clutch Brewing Company		X mark		Evanston, opened in 2021.
Dovetail Brewery	X mark		X mark	Chicago, opened in 2016.
DryHop Brewers		X mark		Chicago, opened in 2013.
Duneyrr Artisan Fermenta Project			X mark	Chicago brewery specializing in beer cofermented with wine, opened in 2021.
Emancipation Brewing Company			X mark	Fairbury, opened in 2019.
Emmett's Brewing Company	X mark	X mark		Founded in 1999. Brewpubs in West Dundee and Palatine. The brewpub in Wheaton closed in 2021. The one in Downers Grove closed in 2025.
Energy City Brewing	X mark			Batavia, opened in 2017.
Engrained Brewing Company	X mark	X mark		Springfield, opened in 2013.
Eris Brewery and Cider House	X mark	X mark		Cider and beer brewery and restaurant in Chicago, opened in 2018.
Evergreen Farm Brewing			X mark	Metamora, opened in 2021.
Excel Brewing Company	X mark			Breese. Founded as a soft drink company in 1936, Excel Bottling Company started brewing beer in 2012.
Fenton Brewing Company		X mark		Mundelein, opened in 2026.
Fiala Brothers Brewery		X mark		Normal, opened in 2022.
Fibs Brewing Company			X mark	Des Plaines, opened in 2019.
Flapjack Brewery		X mark		Berwyn, opened in 2017.
Flipside Brewing	X mark	X mark		Tinley Park, opened in 2022.
Flossmoor Station Brewing Company	X mark	X mark		Flossmoor. Brewpub opened in 1996, bottling operation started in 2008.
Forbidden Root	X mark	X mark		Founded in Chicago in 2013, the beer was initially brewed at various locations. The brewpub on Chicago Avenue opened in 2016. The Columbus, Ohio location opened in 2019. The Cultivate brewpub on Ravenswood Avenue opened in 2021.
Foreign Exchange Brewing Company	X mark	X mark		Aurora. Founded in 2020. Originally the beer was contract brewed. They opened their own brewery in 2025.
Foxes Den Meadery			X mark	Yorkville meadery, opened in 2023.
Fox Republic Brewing			X mark	Yorkville, opened in 2023.
Funky Brew			X mark	Gridley, opened in 2024.
Galena Brewing Company	X mark	X mark	X mark	The brewpub in Galena opened in 2010. The taproom in Moline opened in 2019 and closed in 2023.
Garage Band Brewing			X mark	Plainfield, opened in 2019.
Geneseo Brewing Company			X mark	Geneseo, opened in 2015.
Ginger Road Brewing Company			X mark	Utica, opened in 2023.
Go Brewing	X mark		X mark	Naperville, brewer of no-alcohol and low-alcohol beers, opened in 2022.
Golden Fox Brewing			X mark	Decatur, opened in 2018.
Goldfinger Brewing Company	X mark		X mark	Downers Grove, opened in 2020.
Good Times Brewery		X mark		Chicago, opened in 2023.
Goose Island Beer Company	X mark	X mark	X mark	Founded in Chicago in 1988 as a brewpub on Clybourn Avenue, Goose Island opened a production brewery on Fulton Street in 1995, and a second brewpub, in the Wrigleyville neighborhood, in 1999. The production brewery and its beers, but not the brewpubs, were purchased by Anheuser-Busch InBev in 2011. Goose Island now has national distribution, and some of the beer is produced at other breweries. A taproom at the Fulton Street brewery opened in 2015. The Wrigleyville brewpub closed in 2015. The Clybourn Avenue brewpub was acquired by AB InBev in 2016; it closed in 2023. The brewpub on Blackhawk Street opened in 2024.
Granite City Food & Brewery		X mark		With its headquarters in Minneapolis, Minnesota, Granite City operates several dozen brewpubs in the Midwest, including two in Illinois, in Naperville and Schaumburg.
Greenstar Brewing		X mark		Located at the Uncommon Ground restaurant in Chicago, Greenstar began production in 2014 as the first organic brewery in Illinois.
Guinness Open Gate Brewery	X mark	X mark		Guinness was founded in Dublin, Ireland in 1759. The brewpub in Chicago opened in 2023.
Hailstorm Brewing	X mark		X mark	Tinley Park, opened in 2014.
Hairy Cow Brewing Company		X mark		Byron, opened in 2018.
Half Acre Beer Company	X mark	X mark		Half Acre was founded in 2007, with the beer initially contract brewed in Wisconsin. The brewery on Lincoln Avenue in Chicago started production in 2009, and the tap room opened in 2012. In 2015, a second, larger brewery started production on Balmoral Avenue, a mile and a half from the first location. The Lincoln Avenue tap room added a kitchen in 2016. The Balmoral Avenue brewery added a brewpub in 2017. The Lincoln Avenue location closed in 2021.
Half Day Brewing Company		X mark		Lincolnshire, opened in 2016.
Hand of Fate Brewing Company			X mark	Petersburg, opened in 2016.
Harbor Brewing Company			X mark	Opened in Winthrop Harbor in 2018. Opened a second, larger location in Lake Villa in 2022.
Hardware		X mark		Brewpub in North Aurora, opened in 2016, home of BBGB Brewery and Hop Farm.
Haymarket Pub & Brewery	X mark	X mark		The brewpub in Chicago opened in 2010. The second brewpub and production brewery in Bridgman, Michigan opened in 2017.
Hickory Creek Brewing Company			X mark	New Lenox, opened in 2018. Moved to a new location in 2023.
Highway 20 Brewing Company			X mark	Elizabeth, opened in 2020.
Homewood Brewing Company		X mark		Homewood, opened in 2024.
The Hop Brewery		X mark		Christopher, opened in 2017.
Hop Butcher for the World	X mark		X mark	Founded in Chicago in 2013 as South Loop Brewing Company. Renamed to Hop Butcher for the World in 2016. The beer was brewed at Aquanaut in Chicago, Miskatonic in Darien, and 5 Rabbit in Bedford Park. In 2021 they bought the 5 Rabbit brewery. In 2022 they opened a second, smaller brewery, with a taproom, in Chicago.
Hop District Community Brewing Company			X mark	LaGrange Park, opened in 2022.
Hopewell Brewing Company	X mark		X mark	Chicago, opened in 2016.
Hopskeller Brewing Company			X mark	Waterloo, opened in 2016.
Hopvine Brewing Company		X mark		Aurora, opened in 2013.
Horse Thief Hollow	X mark	X mark		Chicago, opened in 2013.
Ike & Oak Brewing Company		X mark		Woodridge, opened in 2019.
Imperial Oak Brewing			X mark	The Willow Springs brewery and taproom opened in 2014. The Brookfield location opened in 2021.
Industry Ales		X mark		Chicago, opened in 2024.
Industry Brewing Company		X mark		Peoria, opened in 2017.
Iron Spike Brewing Company	X mark	X mark		Galesburg, opened in 2014, added a canning line in 2016.
Is/Was Brewing	X mark		X mark	Chicago, opened in 2024.
Itasca Brewing Company			X mark	Itasca, opened in 2017.
Keg Grove Brewing Company			X mark	The Bloomington brewery opened in 2018. The Morris brewery opened in 2024.
Kennay Farms Distilling			X mark	Farm-to-glass distillery and brewery in Rochelle, opened in 2019.
Kinslahger Brewing Company	X mark		X mark	Oak Park, opened in 2016.
Kishwaukee Brewing Company	X mark		X mark	Woodstock, opened in 2020.
Knack Brewing & Fermentations			X mark	Kankakee, opened in 2022.
Lake Effect Brewing Company	X mark		X mark	Chicago. The brewery on Montrose Ave. opened in 2012 and closed in 2022. The brewery and taproom on Milwaukee Ave. opened in 2025.
Lena Brewing Company	X mark	X mark		Lena, brewery and taproom opened in 2015. Added a restaurant in 2025.
Lieferbräu Brewery			X mark	Red Bud, opened in 2018.
Lil Beaver Brewery	X mark		X mark	Bloomington, opened in 2018.
Limerick Brewing Company			X mark	Lincoln. The Spirited Republic tavern opened in 2015. They added a brewery in 2018.
Lot 50 Brewing			X mark	Paris, opened in 2018.
The Lucky Monk		X mark		South Barrington, opened in 2009.
Lunar Brewing Company			X mark	Villa Park, opened in 1998.
Macushla Brewing Company			X mark	Glenview, opened in 2017.
Mad Hatchet Brewing			X mark	Shorewood, opened in 2019.
Maplewood Brewery & Distillery	X mark	X mark		Founded in Chicago as Mercenary in 2014, renamed to Maplewood in 2015. The taproom opened in 2017. Added a kitchen in 2025. The location in Glen Ellyn opened in 2026. Maplewood merged ownership with Half Acre in 2026.
Marz Community Brewing Company	X mark	X mark		Chicago, opened in 2014. Moved to a new location in 2017, and added a brewpub in 2018. The Life on Marz Community Club nanobrewery and taproom, also in Chicago, opened in 2021.
McHenry Brewing Company			X mark	McHenry, opened in 2018.
Mickey Finn's Brewery	X mark	X mark		Libertyville, opened in 1994; moved to a new location in 2014.
Middle Brow Beer Company	X mark	X mark		Chicago, began production in 2014. The beer has been contract brewed at various breweries in the Chicago area. In 2019 they opened their own brewpub, called Bungalow. Some of their packaged beer is still produced under contract.
Midwest Ale Works			X mark	East Moline, opened in 2019.
Midwest Coast Brewing Company	X mark		X mark	Chicago, opened in 2019.
Mikerphone Brewing	X mark		X mark	Founded in Chicago in 2015. At first the beer was brewed at SlapShot, then at Une Année. They opened their own brewery in Elk Grove Village in 2017.
Milk Money Brewing		X mark		La Grange, opened in 2020.
Millpond Brewing			X mark	Millstadt, opened in 2019.
Mississippi Culture			X mark	Staunton, opened in 2023.
Molly's Pint Brewpub			X mark	Murphysboro, opened in 2017.
Monarch Brewing Company		X mark		Monticello, opened in 2017.
Monochrome Brewing			X mark	Chicago, opened in 2024.
Moody Tongue Brewing Company	X mark	X mark		Chicago, founded in 2014. Added a tap room in 2016. In 2019 they moved to the larger, vacant Baderbrau Brewing Company building and expanded the food menu, closing the old location in June of that year and opening the new one in November.
More Brewing Company	X mark	X mark		The brewpub in Villa Park opened in 2017. The one in Huntley opened in 2020. The brewpub in Bartlett opened in 2023.
Mud Run Brewing Company		X mark		Stockton, opened in 2021.
Nightjar		X mark		Peoria, opened in 2024.
Nightshade and Dark's Pandemonium Brewing			X mark	Waukegan, opened in 2019.
Nik & Ivey Brewing Company			X mark	Lockport, opened in 2020.
Noon Whistle Brewing	X mark	X mark	X mark	The brewery and taproom in Lombard opened in 2014, and added a kitchen in 2020. The production brewery in Naperville opened in 2020, and added a taproom later that year.
Obed & Isaac's		X mark		The brewpub in Springfield opened in 2012. The brewpub in Peoria opened in 2016.
OB's Cervezaria		X mark		Chenoa, opened in 2022.
Obscurity Brewing & Craft Mead	X mark	X mark		Beer and mead brewery and restaurant in Elburn, opened in 2020.
Off Color Brewing	X mark		X mark	Chicago, opened in 2013. A second brewery, with a taproom called the Mousetrap, opened in 2017.
Off Hours Beer Company			X mark	A collaboration between Brooklyn-based Other Half Brewing and the Ramova Theater in Chicago. Opened in 2024 as Other Half Ramova. Renamed to Off Hours in 2025.
Ogle County Brewery		X mark		Oregon, opened in 2021.
Old Bakery Beer Company	X mark	X mark		Alton, opened in 2015.
Old Herald Brewery and Distillery		X mark		Collinsville, opened in 2019.
Old Irving Brewing Company	X mark	X mark		Brewpub inspired by the cuisine of Homaro Cantu. Opened in Chicago in 2016. A separate production brewery in Chicago opened in 2025.
One Allegiance Brewing			X mark	Chicago Ridge, opened in 2020.
One Lake Brewing		X mark		Oak Park, opened in 2019.
Open Outcry Brewing Company		X mark		Chicago, opened in 2017.
Opera House Brewing Company			X mark	Hillsboro, opened in 2018.
Pecatonica Beer Company	X mark		X mark	Warren, opened in 2017.
Peel Brewing Company		X mark		O'Fallon, opened in 2014.
Penrose Brewing Company	X mark		X mark	Geneva, opened in 2014.
The Perch	X mark		X mark	Chicago, opened in 2020.
Phase Three Brewing Company	X mark		X mark	Lake Zurich, founded in 2019. The beer was initially brewed at Lake Zurich Brewing Company, which they bought out in 2020. The brewpub in Elmhurst opened in 2023, with the beer brought in from the brewery in Lake Zurich.
Pho No. 1 Brewing Company		X mark		Nanobrewery and Vietnamese restaurant in Chicago, opened in 2022.
Piece Brewery and Pizzeria		X mark		Chicago, opened in 2001.
Pig Minds Brewing Company	X mark	X mark		Vegan brewpub in Machesney Park, opened in 2012.
Pilot Project			X mark	Chicago brewery and "brewery incubator". The brewpub on Milwaukee Ave. opened in 2019. The brewpub in Milwaukee, Wisconsin opened in 2022. The one on Clark St. opened in 2025.
Pipeworks Brewing Company	X mark			Chicago, opened in 2012, moved to a larger space in 2015.
Pips Meadery	X mark		X mark	Meadery in Beach Park, opened in 2017. The taproom in Gurnee opened in 2023.
Pollyanna Brewing Company	X mark		X mark	The brewery and taproom in Lemont opened in 2014. The Roselare brewery and taproom in Roselle opened in 2017. The brewery, taproom, and distillery in St. Charles opened in 2019.
Prairie Street Brewing Company		X mark		Rockford. Opened as Rockford Brewing Company in 2013, in the old Peacock Brewery. Renamed to Prairie Street in 2016.
Printer's Row Brewing			X mark	Chicago. Initially the beer was brewed at Lake Effect. They opened their own brewery and taproom in 2021.
Rabid Brewing	X mark		X mark	Homewood, opened in 2017.
Radicle Effect Brewerks			X mark	Rock Island, opened in 2012 as Against the Grain Brewery & Alehouse, changed their name in 2014 to Radicle Effect Brewerks.
Radium City Brewing	X mark			Ottawa, opened in 2015.
Rebellion Brew Haus		X mark		Moline, opened in 2016.
Reserve Artisan Ales			X mark	Galesburg, opened in 2022.
Revolution Brewing	X mark		X mark	Chicago. The brewpub on Milwaukee Avenue opened in 2010 and closed in 2024. The production brewery and taproom on Kedzie Avenue opened in 2012.
Rhodell Brewery			X mark	Peoria, opened in 1998. Moved to a larger location in 2015.
Riggs Beer Company	X mark		X mark	Urbana, opened in 2016.
Right Bee Cider	X mark		X mark	Apple cider brewery in Chicago, opened in 2014. The taproom opened in 2019.
Riverlands Brewing Company	X mark		X mark	St. Charles, opened in 2019.
Roaring Table Brewing Company	X mark	X mark		Lake Zurich, opened in 2017. Added a kitchen in 2025.
Rock Bottom Restaurant & Brewery		X mark		Rock Bottom is a chain of brewpubs founded in Denver, Colorado in 1991. It has a number of locations, including one in Illinois, in Warrenville.
Route 51 Brewing Company		X mark		Elkville, opened in 2017.
Route 66 Old School Brewing			X mark	Wilmington, opened in 2019.
Saint Errant Brewing	X mark		X mark	Evanston. Founded in Chicago in 2016, with the beer contract brewed at various locations. Opened their own brewery in 2026.
Sangamo Brewing			X mark	Chatham, opened in 2020.
Schlafly Highland Square	X mark	X mark		The Saint Louis Brewery, makers of Schlafly beer, is based in St. Louis and has several locations in Missouri. The brewpub in Highland, which opened in 2021, is their first in Illinois.
Scorched Earth Brewing Company	X mark		X mark	Algonquin, opened in 2014.
Scratch Brewing Company	X mark	X mark		Ava, opened in 2013.
Sew Hop'd Brewery & Tap Room			X mark	Huntley, opened in 2019.
Shoehorn Brewing	X mark		X mark	Belleville, opened in 2022.
Skeleton Key Brewery	X mark		X mark	Woodridge, opened in 2016. The brewery was damaged by a tornado in June 2021 and reopened in May 2022.
Sketchbook Brewing Company	X mark		X mark	The brewery in Evanston opened in 2014, and added a taproom in 2016. They expanded the taproom in 2019. The brewery and taproom in Skokie opened in 2020.
Slauterhouse Brewing Company			X mark	Auburn, opened in 2020.
Solemn Oath Brewery	X mark		X mark	The brewery and taproom in Naperville opened in 2012. The taproom in Chicago opened in 2021, with the beer brought in from Naperville.
SomosMonos Cervecería			X mark	Chicago, opened in 2025.
Soundgrowler Brewing			X mark	Tinley Park, opened in 2017.
Spiteful Brewing	X mark		X mark	Chicago, opened in 2012. Moved to a new location and added a taproom in 2017.
Springfield Beer Company			X mark	Springfield, opened in 2019.
Standard Meadery			X mark	Villa Park meadery, opened in 2020.
St. Nicholas Brewing Company		X mark		Du Quoin, opened in 2014.
Stockholm's		X mark		Geneva, opened in 2002.
Stubborn German Brewing Company			X mark	Waterloo, opened in 2016.
Sturdy Shelter Brewing			X mark	Batavia, opened in 2022.
Suncatcher Brewing			X mark	Chicago, opened in 2024.
Sundial Brewing & Blending	X mark		X mark	Barrington. Started brewing at Flesk Brewing in 2022. Acquired the brewery in 2023.
Tangled Roots Brewing Company	X mark	X mark		The brewery and Lone Buffalo brewpub in Ottawa opened in 2016. The brewery and Lock and Mule brewpub in Lockport opened in 2021 and closed in 2026. There are also Tangled Roots restaurants in Glenview (opened in 2021), Vernon Hills (2024), South Barrington (2025), and Washington (2025).
Tighthead Brewing Company	X mark		X mark	Mundelein, opened in 2011.
Trail's Edge Brewing Company		X mark		Frankfort, opened in 2018 at the Smokey Barque restaurant.
TreeHive Meadery	X mark		X mark	Brocton, opened in 2023.
Triptych Brewing	X mark		X mark	Savoy, opened in 2013.
Turner Häus Brewery			X mark	Chicago, opened in 2023.
Two Brothers Brewing	X mark	X mark		Two Brothers opened in 1997, and started bottling their beer in 1998. They have two brewpubs — one at the main brewery in Warrenville (opened in 2008), and one at the Two Brothers Roundhouse in Aurora (opened in 2013). In 2017 they also started distilling hard liquor at the Aurora location.
Une Année / Hubbard's Cave	X mark	X mark		Opened in Chicago in 2013. Moved to Niles and added a taproom in 2017. Moved to a different location in Niles and added a kitchen in 2020. (Their Belgian-style beers are branded as Une Année and their American-style beers are branded as Hubbard's Cave.)
Unpossible Mead	X mark			Meadery in Dwight, opened in 2018. The taproom closed in 2025 but the meadery is still in operation.
Urban Forest Craft Brewing			X mark	Rockford, opened in 2020.
Village Vintner Winery & Brewery		X mark		Algonquin, opened in 2012.
Von Jakob Vineyard & Brewery		X mark		Alto Pass. The vineyard was founded in 1996. The brewery opened in 2011.
Werk Force Brewing Company			X mark	Plainfield, opened in 2014.
Whiskey Hill Brewing Company	X mark	X mark		The production brewery in Westmont opened in 2018 and closed in 2025. The brewpub in Westmont opened in 2024. The brewpub in Mount Prospect also opened in 2024.
White Oak Brewing	X mark		X mark	Normal, opened in 2015; added a taproom in 2017.
Wild Blossom Meadery	X mark		X mark	Chicago; opened in 2001; moved to a new location and added a taproom in 2017. Wild Blossom brews mead, using their own honey, and also makes wine and beer.
Wild Onion Brewery	X mark	X mark		Lake Barrington. The brewery opened in 1996 and the Onion Pub brewpub opened in 2003. The Wild Onion Tied House restaurant in Oak Park opened in 2017 and closed in 2021; the beer there was brought in from the Lake Barrington brewery.
Wishful Acres Farm & Brewery	X mark		X mark	Lena, opened in 2016.
Wolfden Brewing Company		X mark		Bloomingdale, opened in 2018.
Yido Brews	X mark			Chicago, maker of makgeolli, opened in 2026.

== Other beer companies ==
- 9th Hour Brewing Company, Lake Villa. The beer is brewed at Harbor Brewing Company.
- Around the Bend Beer Company was founded in Chicago in 2015. Their beer has been brewed at Ale Syndicate, Excel, and Burnt City. It is now brewed at District Brew Yards.
- Azadi Brewing Company, Chicago. The beer is brewed at Pilot Project in Chicago.
- Brutalist Brewing Cooperative, Chicago. Opened at Pilot Project in 2025.
- Burnt City Brewing, Chicago. Originally named Atlas Brewing Company. The brewpub on Lincoln Avenue opened in 2012. The production brewery on 99th Street opened in 2015. Renamed to Burnt City Brewing in 2016. The two locations were merged into a new brewery called District Brew Yards in 2019.
- Cahoots Brewing was founded in Oak Park in 2013, and is currently based in Forest Park. The beer is contract brewed at Church Street Brewing Company and Ten Ninety Brewing Company.
- Conrad Seipp Brewing Company, Chicago, opened in 2020 as a revival of the historical Chicago brewery of the same name. The beer is contract brewed.
- Funkytown Brewery, Chicago, opened in 2021. The beer is brewed at Pilot Project in Chicago.
- Golden Prairie Fermentations, Chicago. Golden Prairie had its own brewery in the 1990s. The brand was re-launched by Argus Brewery in 2018.
- Hidden Hand Brewing, founded in 2021. The beer is brewed at Solemn Oath in Naperville.
- Hopothesis Beer Company was founded in Chicago in 2013. The beer was contract brewed at Minhas Craft Brewery in Monroe, Wisconsin. Hopothesis was acquired by Finch Beer Company in 2016.
- Local Option Bierwerker is based in Chicago. The beer is contract brewed at different breweries.
- MillerCoors, the second-largest beer company in the United States (after Anheuser-Busch), has its national headquarters in Chicago, but does not operate any breweries in Illinois.
- Moor's Brewing Company, Chicago, opened in 2021. Originally the beer was brewed at 18th Street Brewery in Hammond, Indiana. In 2025 they started brewing their own beer at Diversey House in Chicago, along with Steep Ravine Brewing Company. After that the beer was brewed at Homewood Brewing and other locations.
- The Red Barn Restaurant and Brewery, Mount Prospect, opened in 2018. The beer is brewed at Wild Onion in Lake Barrington.
- Reisch Charities in Springfield revived Reisch Beer in 2019. The beer is contract brewed at Potosi Brewing Company in Wisconsin and at Springfield Beer Company in Illinois.
- Sendero Cantina & Cocina, restaurant and bar in Forest Park, opened in 2026. The beer is brewed off-site.
- Steep Ravine Brewing Company. Founded as Ravinia Brewing Company in 2017. Initially the beer was contract brewed at Finch Brewery. The pub in Highland Park opened in 2018, with the beer brought in from offsite. The production brewery on Diversey Avenue in Chicago opened in 2019, and added a brewpub in 2021. The brewpub closed in 2024. The brewery changed their name to Steep Ravine in 2024. In 2025 the brewpub in Chicago reopened as Diversey House; Steep Ravine and Moore's both brewed their beer there; it closed later in 2025.
- Tocayo Brewing Company was founded in 2015 as a joint venture between chef Rick Bayless and Constellation Brands. The beer is contract brewed at Two Brothers in Warrenville.
- Twisted Hippo Brewing was founded in Chicago as Rude Hippo in 2014 and was later renamed to Twisted Hippo. The beer was contract brewed at 18th Street Brewery in Gary, Indiana, SlapShot Brewing in Chicago, and Aleman Brewing in Chicago. They opened their own brewpub in January 2019. It was destroyed by a fire in February 2022. Twisted Hippo started brewing beer at District Brew Yards in August 2022.
- Veteran Beer Company, founded in 2013, is based Chicago. Their brewery is located in Cold Spring, Minnesota.
- WarPigs Brewing Company, founded in Chicago in 2017, started as a joint venture of Mikkeller (in Copenhagen, Denmark) and Three Floyds (in Munster, Indiana). The beer is contract brewed by Great Central Brewing in Chicago and Wisconsin Brewing in Verona, Wisconsin. The WarPigs brewpub in Copenhagen opened in 2015. In 2021 Three Floyds dropped out of the partnership with Mikkeller.
- Woggly Square Brewing Company, Tinley Park, founded in 2018. The beer is brewed at 350 Brewing Company.

== Closed breweries ==
=== Historical breweries: before 1980 ===
- Blattner & Seidenschwanz Brewery, Chicago, opened ca. 1850, closed in 1857.
- Bluff Brewery, Quincy, opened in 1857, closed ca. 1910.
- Bluff City Brewery, Alton.
- Bohemian Brewing Company, Chicago, opened in 1891, closed in 1896.
- William Bohn Brewery, Chicago, opened and closed in 1893.
- Charles Brand & Ernest Hummel Brewing Company, Chicago, opened in 1880, closed in 1997.
- Michael Brand Brewery, Chicago, opened in 1878, closed in 1879.
- Brewer & Hofmann Brewing Company, Chicago, opened in 1886, closed in 1902.
- Brisach & Hessemer Brewery, Chicago, opened in 1858, closed in 1859.
- Broadway Brewing Company, Chicago, opened and closed in 1934.
- Bucher & Hiller Brewery, Chicago, opened in 1858, closed in 1866.
- Conrad Seipp Brewing Company, Chicago, opened in 1854, closed in 1933.
- Dick Brothers Brewery, Quincy, founded in 1856, closed in 1951.
- Eber Brothers Brewery, Quincy, opened ca. 1868, closed in 1906.
- Galena Brewing Company, Galena, opened in 1886, closed in 1936. Makers of Red Stripe beer, not to be confused with the Jamaican beer of the same name.
- Gipps Brewing Co., Peoria, Opened in 1881, closed in 1954. Its flagship Amberlin Beer sold to Canadian Ace Brewing Company of Chicago and brewed until 1963.
- Great Revivalist Brew Lab. The brewpub in Geneseo opened in 2020; the brewpub in Clinton, Iowa opened in 2023; the Geneseo location closed later that year.
- Griesedieck Western Brewery, Belleville, makers of Stag beer.
- Hofmann Brothers Brewery, Chicago, closed in 1925. The related Hofmann Pub in Lyons, located near Hofmann Tower, is also thought to have been a brewery, and was later owned by the Peter Fox Brewing Company; the building was destroyed in a fire in 2013.
- Lill and Diversey Brewery, Chicago, founded 1833.
- Manhattan Brewing Company of Chicago. Opened in 1893; later renamed to Canadian Ace Brewing Company; closed in 1968. Notorious for its connections to Al Capone.
- McAvoy Brewing Company, Chicago, opened in 1865, closed in 1920.
- McHenry Brewery, McHenry, opened in 1868.
- Meyer Brewing Company, Bloomington
- Pabst Brewing Company was founded in Milwaukee, Wisconsin in 1844. They operated a brewery in Peoria Heights, Illinois from 1934 to 1982.
- Peacock Brewery is located in Rockford. The original brewhouse was built in 1857. It was successively owned by the Peacock Brewing Company, the Rockford Brewing Company, and the Rock River Brewing Company, the last of which closed in 1939.
- Peru Beer Company, Peru, opened in 1868, closed in 1943.
- Peter Hand Brewing Company (later known as Meister Brau Brewery), Chicago, the original makers of Meister Brau beer (and Meister Brau Lite); sold their Meister Brau line of beers to Miller in 1972 (who rebranded Meister Brau Lite as Miller Lite) and finally ceased brewing in 1977. They were the last brewery to operate in the city until 1987.
- Reisch Brewery, Springfield, founded in 1849, closed 1966.
- Ruff Brewing Company, Quincy, founded in 1855, closed 1948.
- Schoenhofen Brewing Company, Chicago, makers of Edelweiss beer and Green River soda.
- Sieben's Brewery of Chicago, noted as a point of dispute between Dean O'Banion and Al Capone during Prohibition. See North Side Gang.
- Star Union Brewery, Peru, closed in 1966.
- Stenger Brewery, also known as J and N Stenger Brewery, Naperville, founded in 1848, closed in 1893.
- Warsaw Brewery, Warsaw, founded in 1861, ceased production in 1971. Reopened as a bar and restaurant in 2006.
- White Eagle Brewery, Chicago, opened in 1904, closed in 1950.

=== Modern breweries: after 1980 ===
- 206 Brewing Company, brewery and taproom in Carol Stream, opened in 2023, closed in 2024.
- 25 West Brewing Company, brewpub in Bloomingdale, opened in 2018, closed in 2020.
- 2 Fools Cider, apple cider brewery and taproom in Naperville. Opened in 2016, moved to a new location in 2022, closed in 2023.
- 350 Brewing Company, brewpub in Tinley Park, opened in 2014, closed in 2022.
- 4 Paws Brewing, Chicago microbrewery, opened in 2013, closed in 2014, sold to Aquanaut Brewing.
- 57 70 Brewery, Teutopolis, opened in 2018.
- 5 Rabbit Cervecería. Founded in Chicago in 2011. Originally the beer was contract brewed. They opened their own brewery in Bedford Park in 2012, and added a taproom in 2014. They closed in 2020.
- 718 Brew Cafe, brewpub in Metropolis, opened in 2016.
- Abbey Ridge Brewery and Tap Room, brewpub in Pomona, opened in 2014, destroyed by a fire in 2017.
- Alarmist Brewing, Chicago, opened in 2015. Added a taproom in 2017. Closed in 2026.
- Aleman Brewing Company, Chicago, founded in 2013. Initially the beer was contract brewed. Opened their own brewery in 2016. Closed in 2023.
- Ale Syndicate was founded in Chicago in 2013. The beer was originally contract brewed at several locations, including Big Chicago Brewing Company, Galena Brewing Company, and Excel Brewing Company. The brewery opened in 2014. It closed in 2016.
- All Rise Brewing Company, Chicago. The brewery began operations in 2014, inside the existing Cobra Lounge music venue, bar, and restaurant. Ceased brewing in 2025; venue still open.
- America's Brewpub in the Walter Payton Roundhouse, Aurora, opened in 1996, closed in 2011.
- Andersonville Brewing. The Hamburger Mary's restaurant chain opened a location in Chicago in 2006. A brewery and taproom called Mary's Rec Room was added in 2009. The brewery was renamed to Andersonville Brewing in 2014. It closed in 2019.
- Aquanaut Brewing Company, Chicago, opened in 2014, closed in 2017.
- Arcade Brewery opened in Chicago in 2014, and operated as an alternating proprietorship at the Ale Syndicate brewery. It closed in 2016.
- Argus Brewery, Chicago. Opened in 2009, in a building built in 1906 as a Schlitz beer distribution facility. Closed in 2020.
- Baderbräu Brewing Company. In 2012 they revived Baderbräu beer, which initially was contract brewed at the Stevens Point Brewery in Stevens Point, Wisconsin. The Chicago brewery and tap room opened in 2016, and added a kitchen in 2017. It closed in 2018.
- Ballast Point Tasting Room and Kitchen, Chicago brewpub. Ballast Point Brewing Company was founded in San Diego in 1996. It was acquired by Constellation Brands in 2015. The brewpub in Chicago opened in 2018. Most of the beer there came from Ballast Point breweries in California and Virginia, but some was brewed onsite. Ballast Point was acquired by Kings & Convicts Brewing Company in 2019. They closed the Chicago location in 2021.
- Band of Bohemia, Chicago brewpub that won a Michelin star, opened in 2015, closed in 2020.
- Banging Gavel Brews, founded in 2014. Initially the beer was contract brewed. Opened their own brewery in the Vogt Building in Tinley Park in 2023. Ceased brewing c. 2026; restaurant still open.
- Bearded Owl Brewing, Peoria brewpub, opened in 2018, closed in 2023.
- Belly Up Beer Company, brewery in Western Springs, opened in 2016, closed ca. 2018.
- Berghoff beer was first brewed in Fort Wayne, Indiana in 1887, and has been served at the Bergoff restaurant in downtown Chicago since 1898, except during Prohibition. From 1954 to 2018, the beer was produced under contract — first by the Falstaff Brewing Company in St. Louis, Missouri, then by the Joseph Huber Brewing Company in Monroe, Wisconsin, and then by Stevens Point Brewery in Stevens Point, Wisconsin. Berghoff also had a separate brewpub in Chicago from 1990 to 1993.
- Big Chicago Brewing Company, Zion, contract brewer for beers such as Ten Ninety, Cahoots, and Middle Brow. Founded in 2012, they were bought out by Ten Ninety in 2014.
- Big Hurt Beer was owned by former baseball player Frank Thomas. The Big Hurt Brewhouse restaurant in Berwyn opened in 2014 and closed in 2016. It reopened in 2017 under the name 35 Sports Bar & Grill, and closed again in 2018. The beer, which was also available in cans, was contract brewed by Minhas Craft Brewery in Monroe, Wisconsin.
- Birreria Chicago, opened in 2013 inside Eataly Chicago.
- Black & Gray Brewing Company, brewery and taproom in East Dundee, opened in 2019, closed in 2026.
- Black Belt Brewery, Lake Zurich, production brewery with a canning line, opened in 2016, closed in 2017.
- Blue Cat Brewing Company, brewpub in Rock Island. Opened as Blue Cat Brew Pub in 1994. Closed in 2018. Reopened as Big Swing Brewing Company in 2019. Renamed to Blue Cat Brewing Company in 2021. Closed in 2022.
- Blue Island Beer Company, brewery and taproom in Blue Island, opened in 2015, closed in 2026.
- Blue Nose Brewery and taproom, opened in Justice in 2012, moved to Hodgkins in 2015, closed in 2021.
- Border Town Pub, Momence. Bar opened in 2002. In-house brewery began operations in 2014. Closed in 2018.
- Bosacki's Brewery, taproom in Mundelein, opened in 2016, closed in 2025.
- Box Office Brewery and Restaurant, DeKalb, opened in 1994, closed in 1998.
- Brass Restaurant & Brewery, South Barrington, opened in 2003, closed in 2009.
- BreakRoom Brewery, Chicago brewpub, opened in 2015, closed in 2016.
- Buzz Bomb Brewing Company, brewery and taproom in Springfield, opened in 2018. Added a second brewery, in Illiopolis, later that year. Closed in 2025.
- Byers Brewing Company, brewery and taproom in DeKalb, opened in 2019, closed in 2024.
- Cademon Brewing Company, brewery and taproom in Genoa, opened in 2014, closed in 2016.
- Capitol City Brewing, Springfield.
- Casa Humilde Cerveceria Artesanal. Began operations in 2019 at District Brew Yards in Chicago. Opened their own brewpub in Forest Park in 2024. Closed in 2026.
- Chain O' Lakes Brewing Company, McHenry taproom, opened in 2013 in the old McHenry Brewery building, closed in 2018.
- Chicago Brewing Company, Chicago, opened in 1989.
- Chief's Brewing Company, Champaign, became Joe's Brewery.
- Copper Dragon Brewing Company, Carbondale. Opened in 1996. Ceased brewing in 2005 but stayed open as a music venue. Closed in 2019.
- Crazy Llama Brewing Company, brewery and taproom in Roscoe, opened in 2020, closed in 2024.
- Crooked Waters, Peoria brewpub, closed in 2000.
- D and G Brewing Company, brewery and taproom in St. Charles, opened in 2018, closed in 2025.
- Diversey House, Chicago brewpub, opened in 2025 as a collaboration between Steep Ravine Brewing Company and Moor's Brewing Company, closed in 2025.
- Dry City Brew Works, brewery and taproom in Wheaton, opened in 2014, closed in 2023.
- Effing Brew Company, brewpub in Effingham, opened in 2018, closed in 2022.
- Elder Brewing Company, brewery and taproom in Joliet, opened in 2017, closed in 2023.
- Elmhurst Brewing Company, brewpub in Elmhurst, opened in 2018, closed in 2025.
- Empirical Brewery, Chicago. Opened in 2014. In 2015 they added a taproom. Closed in 2022.
- Evil Horse Brewing Company, brewery and taproom in Crete, opened in 2016. Ceased brewing in 2024; still open as a craft beer bar.
- Exit Strategy Brewing Company, brewery and taproom in Forest Park, opened in 2015, closed in 2023.
- Finch Beer Company, Chicago. Opened in 2011 as Finch's Beer Company. In 2016 they changed their name to Finch Beer Company and opened a brewpub at a second location, which closed later that year. In 2017 they bought the Like Minds brewery and moved their operations there. In 2020 they opened a brewpub called The Perch at a separate location. The main brewery closed in 2022, though The Perch remained open.
- First Forest Brewing Company, brewery and taproom in Hodgkins, opened in 2021, closed in 2023.
- Flatlander's Restaurant and Brewery, Lincolnshire, opened in 1996, closed in 2012.
- Flesk Brewing, opened in Lombard in 2013. Moved to Barrington and added a taproom in 2017. Closed in 2023.
- Forge Brewhouse. Opened as a brewpub in Sycamore in 2015. Moved to a production brewery and taproom in DeKalb in 2018. Closed in 2022.
- Forgottonia Brewing, brewery and taproom in Macomb, opened in 2019, closed in 2024.
- Generations Brewing Company, brewery and taproom in Freeport, opened in 2014, closed in 2026.
- Gino's Brewing Company, Chicago. Gino's East added a brewery at its River North restaurant in 2015. The restaurant and brewery closed in 2020.
- Glen Ellyn Sports Brew, Glen Ellyn.
- Golden Prairie Brewing, Chicago, opened in 1992, closed in 1999.
- Gordon Biersch Brewery Restaurants originated in Palo Alto, California in 1988 and became a multi-state chain. The location in Bolingbrook opened in 2007. It was rebranded as a Rock Bottom Restaurant & Brewery in 2018.
- Govnor's Public House, Lake in the Hills, opened in 2001, closed in 2008.
- Grainology Brewstillery, brewery, distillery, and taproom in Batavia, opened in 2023, closed in 2025.
- Granite City is an interstate chain of brewpubs. The locations in Orland Park, East Peoria, and Northbrook closed in 2019. The one in Rockford closed in 2020. The ones in Naperville and Schaumburg are still open.
- Great Central Brewing Company, contract brewery in Chicago, opened in 2016. The taproom opened in 2017. Closed in 2026.
- Harrison's Restaurant and Brewery, Orland Park, opened in 1998, closed in 2013.
- Hofbräuhaus Chicago opened in Rosemont in 2013 and closed in 2021. Hofbräuhaus St. Louis opened in Belleville in 2018 and closed in 2023. The brewpubs were part of an international chain licensed by the original Hofbräuhaus in Munich, Germany.
- Holzlager Brewing Company, brewery and taproom in Woodstock, opened in 2019, closed in 2025.
- Hopcats Brewing Company, Chicago brewpub, opened in 1998.
- Hopper's Garage Brewing Company, Antioch brewery, opened in 2015.
- Howard Street Brewing Company, Chicago nanobrewery and taproom, opened in 2022, closed in 2023.
- Illinois Brewing Company, Bloomington, opened in 1999, brewery became operational in 2000, closed in 2014.
- Illuminated Brew Works, Chicago, opened in 2014. Moved to a new location and added a taproom in 2021. Closed in 2026.
- Joe's Brewery, Champaign, ceased brewing, bar still open.
- Jolly Pumpkin Artisan Ales was founded in Dexter, Michigan in 2004. The Chicago brewpub opened in 2017. Most of the beer there came from the Dexter brewery, but some was brewed onsite. It closed in 2022.
- JT Walker's Brewery, brewpub in Mahomet, opened in 2013, closed in 2020.
- J.W. Platek's Restaurant & Brewery, Richmond, closed in 2010.
- Khaos Brewcade & Kitchen, brewpub in Plainfield, opened in 2021. Ceased brewing c. 2026; restaurant still open.
- Kings & Convicts Brewing Company, brewery and taproom in Highwood, opened in 2017. In 2019 they acquired Ballast Point Brewing Company which is based in San Diego. In 2022 they bought the Saint Archer brewery and taprooms which are also in the San Diego area. Kings & Convicts closed in 2024, with the company retaining ownership of Ballast Point.
- Knox County Brewing Company, brewery and taproom in Galesburg, opened in 2018, closed in 2022.
- Lagunitas Brewing Company was founded in Lagunitas, California 1993, and moved to Petaluma, California in 1994. They built a second brewery in Chicago in 2014, the largest in the city. The taproom opened a few months later. In 2015 Heineken International purchased a 50% stake in the company, and in 2017 it purchased the other 50%. The Chicago location closed in 2024.
- Lake Bluff Brewing Company, brewpub in Lake Bluff, opened in 2011, closed in 2026.
- Lake Zurich Brewing Company, Lake Zurich, opened in 2018, closed in 2020.
- Light the Lamp Brewery, brewpub in Grayslake, opened in 2012. Moved to a new location in 2018. Closed in 2024.
- Like Minds Brewing Company, founded in 2014. The beer was originally contract brewed by Hinterland in Green Bay, Wisconsin. In 2015 Like Minds moved to Chicago and opened their own brewery. In 2016 they opened a second location, a brewpub in Milwaukee, Wisconsin. In 2017 they sold their Chicago brewery to Finch Beer Company. In 2018 the Milwaukee location closed.
- Limestone Brewing Company, Plainfield brewpub, opened in 2009, closed in 2012.
- Lionstone Brewing, Geneseo brewpub, opened in 2015, closed in 2020.
- Liquid Love Brewing, brewery and taproom in Buffalo Grove, opened in 2020, closed in 2025.
- Lo-Rez Brewing, Chicago. Opened in 2016. Added a taproom in 2017. Closed in 2023.
- Lugan's Brewing, brewery and distillery in Joliet, opened in 2019. Ceased brewing, continued in business as Lugan's Spirits.
- Mad Mouse Brewing Company, Chicago, opened in 2014 in the Moxee restaurant, closed in 2017.
- Metal Monkey Brewing, brewery and taproom in Romeoville, opened in 2016, closed in 2023.
- Metropolitan Brewing, Chicago, opened in 2009. Moved to a new location and added a taproom in 2017. Closed in 2023.
- Miskatonic Brewing Company, brewery and taproom in Darien, opened in 2015, closed in 2025.
- MobCraft Beer was founded in Madison, Wisconsin in 2013. Initially the beer was contract brewed. They moved to Milwaukee, Wisconsin and opened their own brewery in 2016. The brewpub in Woodstock opened in 2023 and closed in 2024.
- Moonshine, Chicago bar and restaurant that opened in 2001, added an in-house brewery in 2008, and closed in 2014.
- Motor Row Brewing, brewery and taproom in Chicago, opened in 2015, closed in 2021.
- M.T. Barrels Restaurant & Brewery, West Dundee.
- MyGrain Brewing Company, brewpub in Joliet, opened in 2017, closed in 2023.
- Myths and Legends Brewing Company, brewery and taproom in Westmont. Opened in 2013 as Urban Legend Brewing Company. Renamed to Myths and Legends in 2016. Bought out by Whiskey Hill in 2018.
- Nevin's Brewing Company, Plainfield brewpub, opened in 2012. The brewery was renamed to Midnight Pig Beer in 2017. Closed in 2019.
- North Shore Cider Company, cider brewery and taproom in Evanston, opened in 2017, closed in 2021.
- Oak Park Brewing Company, brewery and brewpub in Oak Park co-located with Hamburger Mary's Show Lounge; opened in 2016, closed in 2021.
- O'Grady's Brewery and Pub, Arlington Heights, opened in 1996.
- O'Griff's Grill & Brewhouse, Quincy, opened in 1994, closed in 2019.
- One Trick Pony, brewery and taproom in Lansing, opened in 2012, closed in 2024.
- Only Child Brewing, brewery and taproom, opened in Northbrook in 2013, moved to Gurnee in 2015, closed in 2022.
- On Tour Brewing Company, brewery and taproom in Chicago, opened in 2017, closed in 2025.
- Ørkenoy, brewpub in Chicago, opened in 2020, closed in 2024.
- Oswego Brewing Company, brewery and taproom in Oswego, opened in 2018, closed in 2023.
- Pavichevich Brewing Company, Elmhurst, original makers of Baderbräu beer, opened in 1988, closed in 1997.
- Peckish Pig, brewpub in Evanston, opened in 2014. Ceased brewing in 2024; restaurant still open.
- Peoria Brewing Company, Peoria, production brewery and brewpub, opened in 2014, closed in 2017.
- Prairie Krafts Brewing Company, brewery and taproom in Buffalo Grove, opened in 2016, closed in 2020.
- Prairie Rock Brewing Company. The Elgin brewpub opened in 1995 and closed in 2009; the Schaumburg brewpub opened in 1999 and closed in 2007.
- Pratt Brewing Company, production brewery in Spring Grove, opened in 2022, closed in 2025.
- Punk Rock Pizza & Brewery, Silvis, opened in 2024, closed in 2025.
- The Ram Restaurant & Brewery is a chain of brewpubs. The first restaurant opened in Lakewood, Washington in 1971, and the first brewery opened in Salem, Oregon in 1995. The brewpub in Schaumburg opened in 2000 and closed in 2018. The brewpub in Wheeling opened in 2001 and closed in 2019. The Rosemont location, which did not brew beer on site, opened in 2003 and closed in 2020.
- Recess Brewing, brewery and taproom in Edwardsville, opened in 2014, closed in 2023.
- Reinstone Brewery, Illiopolis, opened in 2016.
- River Hawk Brewing, Channahon taproom, opened in 2017, closed in 2022.
- The Rock Bottom Restaurant & Brewery in Chicago closed in 2023, after being open for more than 20 years. The one in Bolingbrook opened in 2018 and closed in 2022. The one in Lombard closed in 2023. The one in Orland Park closed in 2025. The one in Warrenville is still open.
- Rolling Meadows Brewery, farm-to-table brewery in Cantrall, opened in 2011, closed in 2020.
- Ryan Brewing Company, microbrewery and taproom in Roscoe, opened in 2018, closed in 2018.
- Scallywag Brewing Company, brewery and taproom in Westmont, opened in 2019, closed in 2020.
- Second City Meadery, Chicago meadery, opened in 2020, added a tasting room in 2021, closed in 2025.
- Seery Athlone Brewing Company, brewery and taproom in Addison, opened in 2018, closed in 2019.
- ShadowView Brewing, Woodstock, restaurant opened in 2018, added a brewery in 2019, closed in 2023.
- Short Fuse Brewing Company, production brewery and brewpub in Schiller Park, opened in 2017, closed in 2026.
- Side Lot Brewery, Wauconda brewpub, opened in 2016. Ceased brewing in 2022, still open as a restaurant called The Side Lot.
- Sieben's River North, Chicago brewpub, opened in 1987, closed in 1990. The first modern-era craft brewery in Chicago.
- SlapShot Brewing Company, Chicago, opened in 2013, closed in 2016.
- Slow City Makgeolli was the country's largest and highest-profile maker of makgeolli, a fermented rice beverage native to Korea with an alcohol content similar to that of beer. A subsidiary of Baesangmyun Brewery, it opened in Niles in 2013. It closed ca. 2016.
- Small Town Brewery, Wauconda, opened in 2011, tap room opened in 2015, closed in 2019.
- Smylie Brothers Brewing Company. The brewpub in Evanston opened in 2014. The production brewery on Wolcott Avenue in Chicago opened in 2017. The brewpub on Broadway Street in Chicago opened in 2021 and closed in 2022. The brewpub in Evanston closed later that year.
- Spirit Water, brewery, distillery, and taproom in Cary, opened in 2020, closed in 2025.
- Steam Hollow Brewing Company, brewery and taproom in Manteno, opened in 2019, closed in 2023.
- Stunt Brewing Company, nanobrewery and taproom in Glenview, opened in 2021, closed in 2022.
- The Tap & Growler, Chicago, opened in 1987, closed in 1992.
- Taylor Brewing Company. Brewpub that opened in Naperville in 1994; moved to Lombard in 1999; closed in 2011.
- Temperance Beer Company, production brewery and taproom in Evanston, opened in 2013, closed in 2024.
- Ten Ninety Brewing Company, founded in 2013. Initially the beer was contract brewed at Big Chicago Brewing Company in Zion, which Ten Ninety then acquired in 2014. The brewery moved to a new location with a taproom in Glenview in 2016. They added a kitchen in 2019. Closed in 2025.
- Three Angels Brewing, Yorkville, opened in 2012.
- Timotheus Brothers Brewery, Springfield, opened in 2015, closed in 2018.
- Tonality Brewing Company, brewpub in Mundelein, opened in 2023, closed in 2025.
- Tribes Beer Company. Started as the Tribes Alehouse bar and restaurant in Mokena (2009) and Tinley Park (2012), then added a brewery at the Mokena location in 2015. Opened a larger brewery and taproom in Mokena in 2018. The first Mokena location closed in 2019. The bar and restaurant in Tinley Park closed later that year. The Mokena brewpub closed in 2023.
- Two Doors Down Brewery, Clinton, opened in 2018, brewery ceased operations in 2022; venue continued operating as a craft beer bar.
- Two Hound Red, brewpub in Glen Ellyn, opened in 2019, closed in 2025.
- Urban Brew Labs, Chicago, opened in 2018 as Urban Renewal Brewery. They later changed their name to Urban Brew Labs. Added a taproom in 2021. Closed in 2022.
- Vice District Brewing Company. The brewery and taproom in Chicago opened in 2014. A larger brewery and taproom in Homewood opened in 2018. The Chicago location closed in 2019. The Homewood location closed later that year.
- Wake Brewing, brewery and taproom in Rock Island, opened in 2017, closed in 2026.
- Weeghman Park Restaurant Brewery, Chicago brewpub, opened in 1997, closed in 1999.
- The Weinkeller was a restaurant in Berwyn that added a brewery in 1988. They opened a second location in Westmont in 1992.
- Whiner Beer Company, Chicago brewery and taproom, opened in 2016, closed in 2026.
- White Rooster Farmhouse Brewery, brewery and taproom in Sparta, opened in 2017, closed in 2026.
- Will County Brewing Company, brewery and taproom, opened in Shorewood in 2018. The Channahon location opened in 2023 and closed in 2024. The Shorewood location closed in 2026.
- ZümBier, brewery and taproom in Waukegan, opened in 2014, closed in 2024.

== See also ==
- Beer in the United States
- List of breweries in the United States
- List of microbreweries
- List of wineries in Illinois
