= CBD Architects =

American architecture firm

Practice information
- Key architects: Jeremiah Johnson (Founder/Principal)
- Founded: 1998 (founded); 2000 (incorporated)
- Location: 770 N. LaSalle Blvd, Suite 801, River North, Chicago, Illinois, U.S. (headquarters)

Significant works and honors
- Awards: 2014 Architizer A+ Awards: Special Mention; 2012 AIA Chicago: Small Project Citation of Merit

Website
- cbdarchitects.com

CBD Architects, also known as Chicago Building Design, P.C., is an American commercial architecture firm specializing in hospitality design. Founded in Chicago (1998), CBD has diversified to offices in Miami and New Orleans, with licensed architects in nine states: Colorado, Florida, Illinois, Indiana, Louisiana, Mississippi, Montana, New York, Texas, Washington, and Wisconsin.

== History ==
The firm was founded by Jeremiah Johnson in 1998 and incorporated as Chicago Building Design, P.C. in 2000. It adopted the name, CBD Architects, to reflects its growth to designs in Miami, New Orleans, and New York.

CBD Architects specializes in commercial architecture's hospitality design market. Other firm services include permits, renovations, occupancy drawings, public right of way, and building code violation assistance.

=== Designs ===
Notable designs include:

- STK Chicago of The ONE Group (forthcoming) — River North, Chicago
- Pomp & Circumstance (2015) by Hubbard Inn owners — Old Town, Chicago
- Bangers & Lace (2015) — Evanston
- Gino's East (2014) — River North and South Loop, Chicago
- Celeste (2014) — River North, Chicago
- Siena Tavern (2013) — River North, Chicago
- Stout Barrel House & Galley (2012) — River North, Chicago
- The Boarding House (2012) — River North, Chicago
- Public House (2011) — River North, Chicago
- Hubbard Inn (2010) — River North, Chicago
