= James Page Brewing Company =

Coordinates: 44°30′37.65″N 89°34′32.78″W

- Industry: Alcoholic beverage
- Founded: 1986
- Founder: James Page
- Defunct: 2005
- Headquarters: Stevens Point, Wisconsin, United States
- Products: Beer

James Page Brewing Company is a microbrewery that packages its beer in cans. The brand is produced at the Stevens Point Brewery in Stevens Point, Wisconsin.

== History ==
The brewery was founded by Minneapolis attorney James Page in 1986. It was located on Quincy Street in Northeast Minneapolis, in an aging industrial warehouse building. The brewery's infrastructure was cobbled together from secondhand equipment. Page never exceeded more than about 1500 barrels per year of production until it was sold to new owners in the mid 1990s.

In addition to operating a brewery, James Page was also a home brewing retailer. It operated a retail store out of the company's tap room and had a mail order shipping/catalog operation.

In October 1995, James Page sold the brewery to a group of investors with a background in food marketing. Page continued to operate a home brew supply company until 1998 under the name "James Page Brewing", although there was no longer any tie to the brewery.

The new owners of the brewery, led by President David Anderson, thoroughly re-invented the brand. They created a fictional character to personify "James Page", who bore little resemblance to the founder of the company; he was a rugged American frontiersman. They also stopped the practice of trucking the beer to distant bottling lines. Instead, they produced the bottled product as a contract brew at regional breweries (Minnesota Brewing Company in St. Paul, and then Stroh's in St. Paul). The draught product continued to be brewed at the Quincy Street brewery.

In 1998, Page became one of the first American craft breweries to package its beer in cans. The canned product was brewed and packaged under contract at the August Schell Brewing Company in New Ulm, Minnesota. It won a contract with Northwest Airlines to feature the canned beer on certain domestic flights.

Despite a more aggressive marketing push, the brewery's new management was not able to turn a profit. The James Page Brewing Company suffered from an identity crisis: although the Quincy Street brewery produced beer for its draught accounts, the bottled product was a contract brew. The beer in the bottles was not the same product as the beer in the kegs, and this did not help its reputation among beer aficionados. As a result, Page management made the acquisition of a bottling line a top priority during the late 1990s and early 2000s.

In 2000, James Page had a stock offering, and the first $400,000 was specifically earmarked for the bottling line. It advertised the stock offering on six-packs, soliciting investments as small as $285. The company announced that it had successfully raised the maximum $855,000 from over 1,000 investors in January, 2000. But the money was never used to fund expansion; instead it was used to lower the company's debt burdens, and the bottling line was never built. In 2002, the brewery was shut down. The company continued to contract-brew beer at other regional breweries.

In 2005, the company's final asset was liquidated when the Page brand name was purchased by the Stevens Point Brewery in Stevens Point, Wisconsin.

== Products ==
James Page's most popular beers in the early period included Private Stock (an amber lager), Boundary Waters Lager (possibly the first commercially-produced beer made with wild rice), Boundary Waters Bock, Burly Brown Ale, and Mill City Wheat. James Page Private Stock and Boundary Waters Lager were available in six-packs year-round.

== See also ==
- List of defunct breweries in the United States
