= 5 Rabbit Cervecería =

American brewery

Coordinates: 41.7579196°N 87.7799526°W

- Interactive map of 5 Rabbit Cervecería
- Location: Bedford Park, Illinois
- Opened: 2011
- Annual production volume: 6,000–8,000 US beer barrels (7,000–9,400 hL) in 2012
- Website: 5rabbitbrewery.com

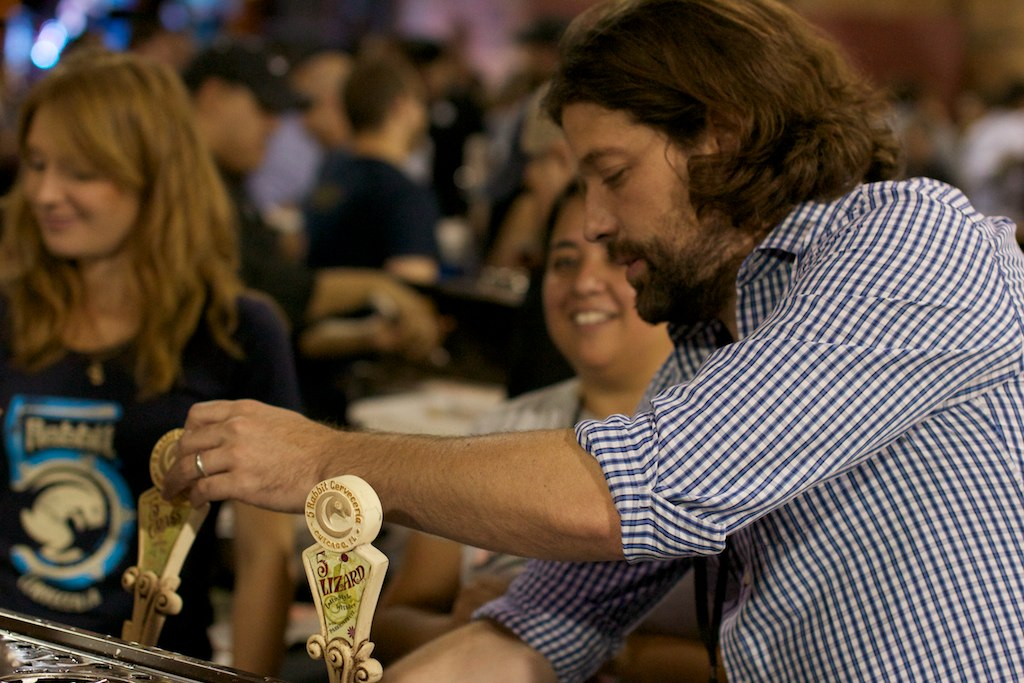
5 Rabbits Cerveceria beer being served in 2012.

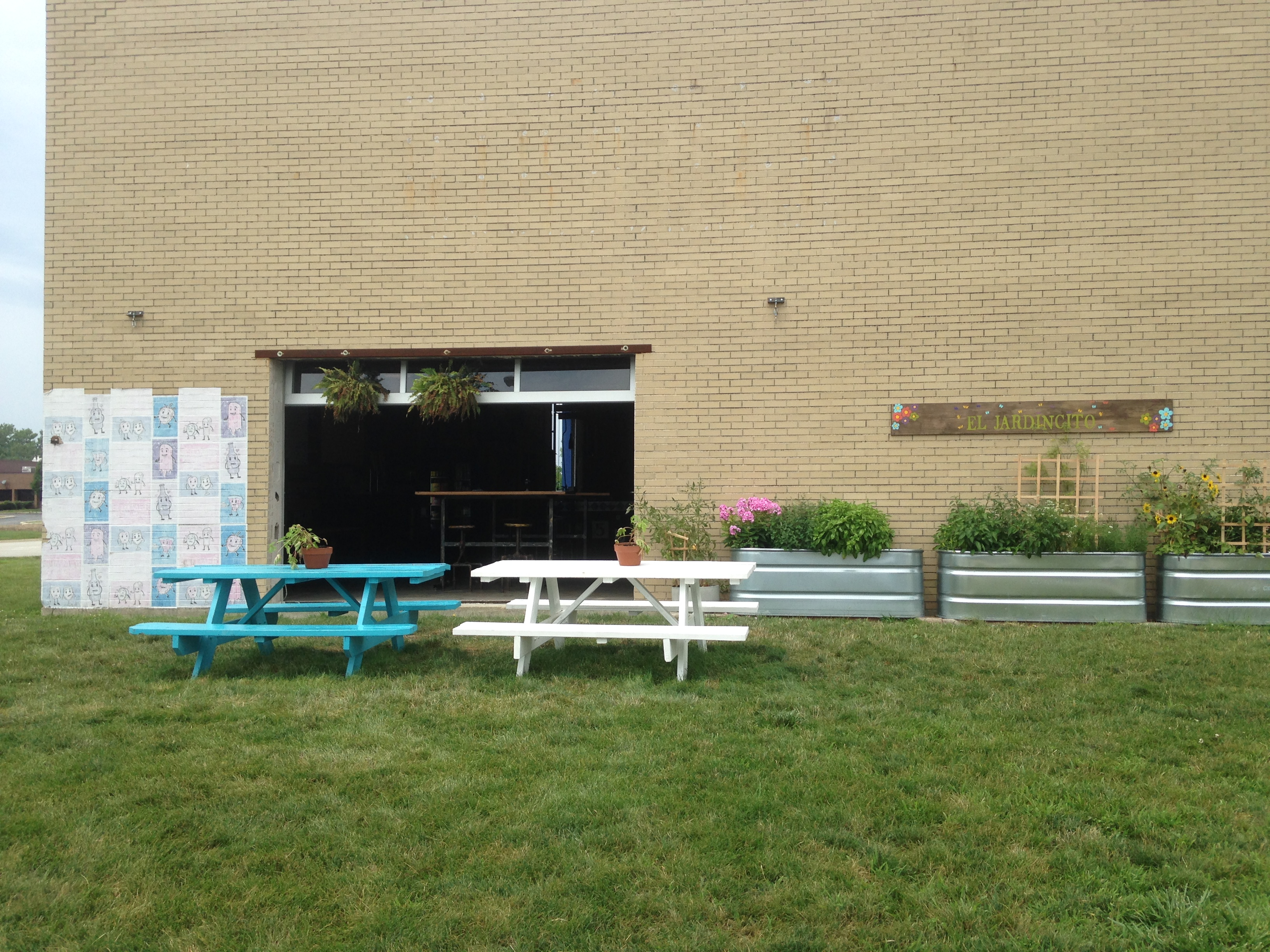
Side entrance to the brewery and taproom, in 2018.

5 Rabbit Cervecería was a brewery in Bedford Park, Illinois United States, that was founded in 2011 and opened in 2012. It was "the first Latin-themed craft brewery in the United States". Many of the beers are brewed with ingredients inspired by Hispanic cuisine and culture. The name of the brewery is a reference to the Aztec deity Macuiltochtli.

== History ==
5 Rabbit Cervecería was founded in 2011 by Andrés Araya and Isaac Showaki, along with minority investor Randy Mosher who created the recipes for the beer. Originally the beer was contract brewed at Argus Brewery. 5 Rabbit opened their own brewery in Bedford Park in 2012. Showaki left the company in 2013 and later founded Octopi Brewing in Waunakee, Wisconsin. The brewery added an on-site taproom in 2014. Helping Araya run 5 Rabbit was his wife and brewery co-owner Mila Ramirez, with Mosher serving as creative director.

The brewery was completely closed by 2022.

== Beers ==
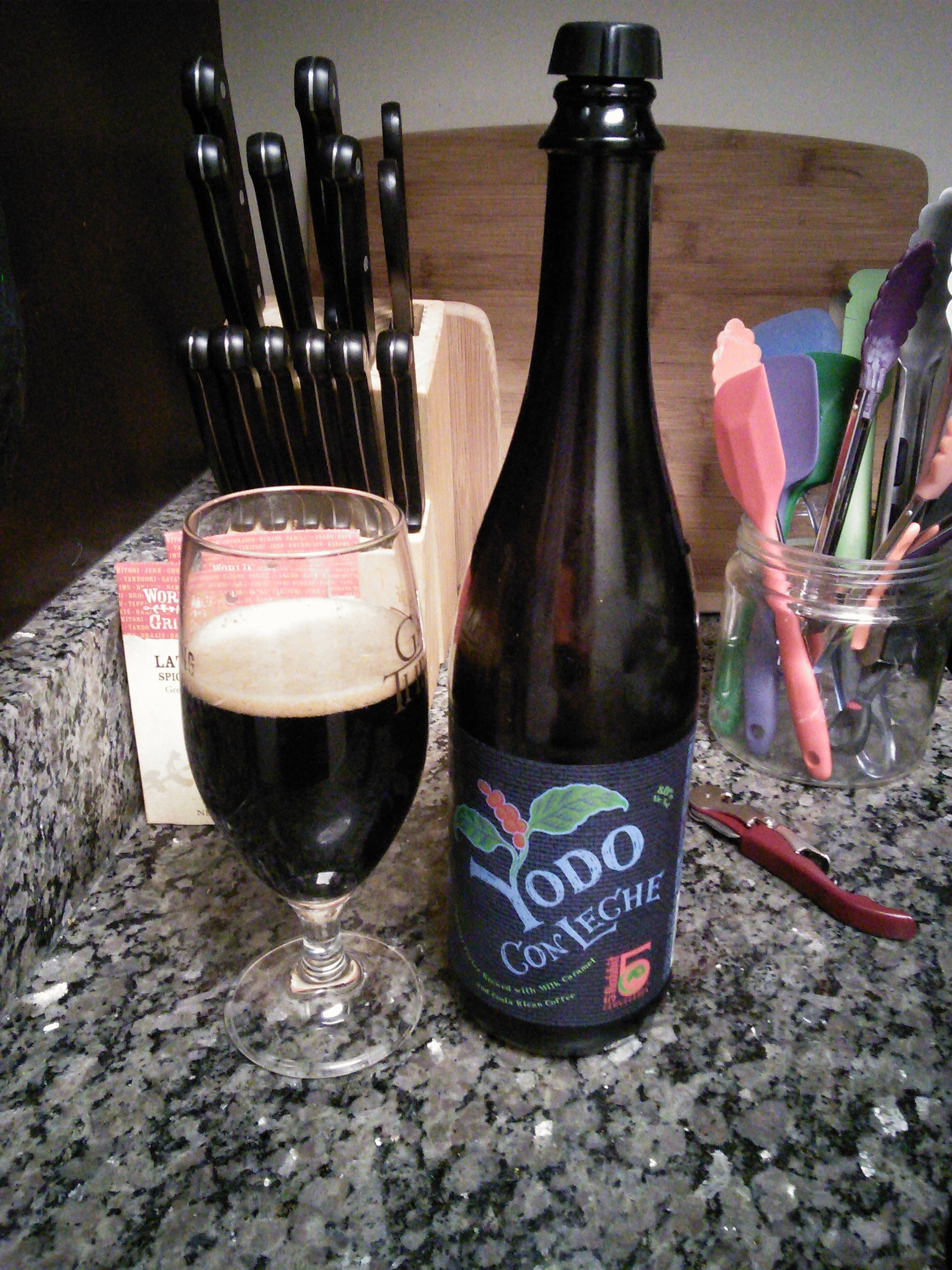
5 Rabbit Cerveceria - Yodo con leche

5 Rabbit Cervecería produced a number of different beers. Some of them were available year-round, some were seasonal, and some were one-offs. They once brewed a beer that included chapulines (grasshoppers) as an ingredient.

5 Rabbit Beers
Name	Style	ABV %	IBU	Notes
5 Rabbit	Golden ale	5.3	32	Year-round
5 Vulture	Oaxacan-style dark ale	6.4	35	Year-round
5 Lizard	Latin-style witbier	4.3	20	Year-round
5 Grass	Hoppy ale	6.4	60	Year-round
Vida y Muerte	Harvest ale	6.3	24	Seasonal (Fall)
Huitzi	Midwinter ale	8.5	22	Seasonal (Winter)
Paletas (various fruit versions)	Fruit beer	3.5		Seasonal (Summer)

== Chinga Tu Pelo beer ==
In June 2015, 5 Rabbit Brewery announced that it would cease doing business with Donald Trump because of his statements about Mexican immigrants. The brewery had brewed a batch of beer especially for a bar in Trump Tower Chicago. They ceased shipping the beer to the bar, and stated that the beer would be renamed to Chinga Tu Pelo (English: Fuck Your Hair), in an apparent reference to Trump's hair. A few days after that, Gino's East purchased that batch of beer from the brewery. 5 Rabbit sometimes brews beer using the same recipe, rebranded as La Protesta, a golden ale which is sold in cans designed by local artists. A documentary short film about these events, titled F*** Your Hair, was released in 2019.

== See also ==
- List of companies in the Chicago metropolitan area
- List of microbreweries
