= Scratch Brewing =

Restaurant in Ava, Illinois, U.S.

- Interactive map of Scratch Brewing

Restaurant information
- Location: 264 Thompson Road, Ava, Illinois, 62907, United States
- Coordinates: 37°52′37″N 89°25′49″W
- Website: scratchbeer.com

Scratch Brewing is a restaurant in Ava, Illinois. It was included in The New York Times's 2024 list of the 22 best pizzerias in the U.S.

== See also ==
- List of breweries in Illinois
