= Half Acre Beer Company =

Chicago brewery

- Location: Chicago, Illinois; United States
- Opened: 2007
- Annual production volume: 43,000 US beer barrels (50,000 hL) in 2017
- Owned by: Gabriel Magliaro
- Website: halfacrebeer.com

Active beers
Name	Type
Daisy Cutter	West Coast pale ale
Akari Shogun	Wheat ale
Pony Pilsner	Pilsner
Gone Away	India Pale Ale
Lead Feather	Black Ale

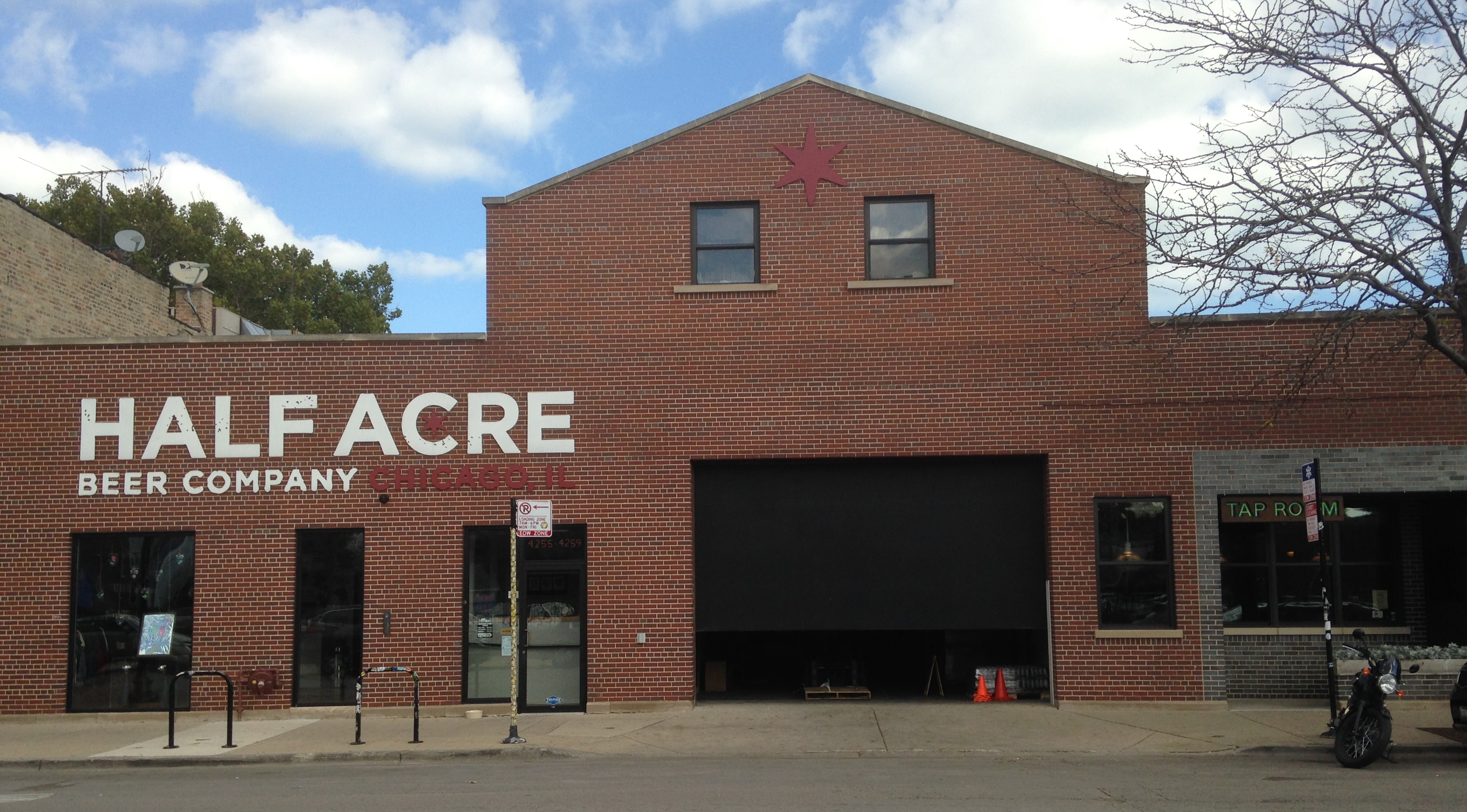
The Half Acre brewery and tap room on Lincoln Avenue in 2015

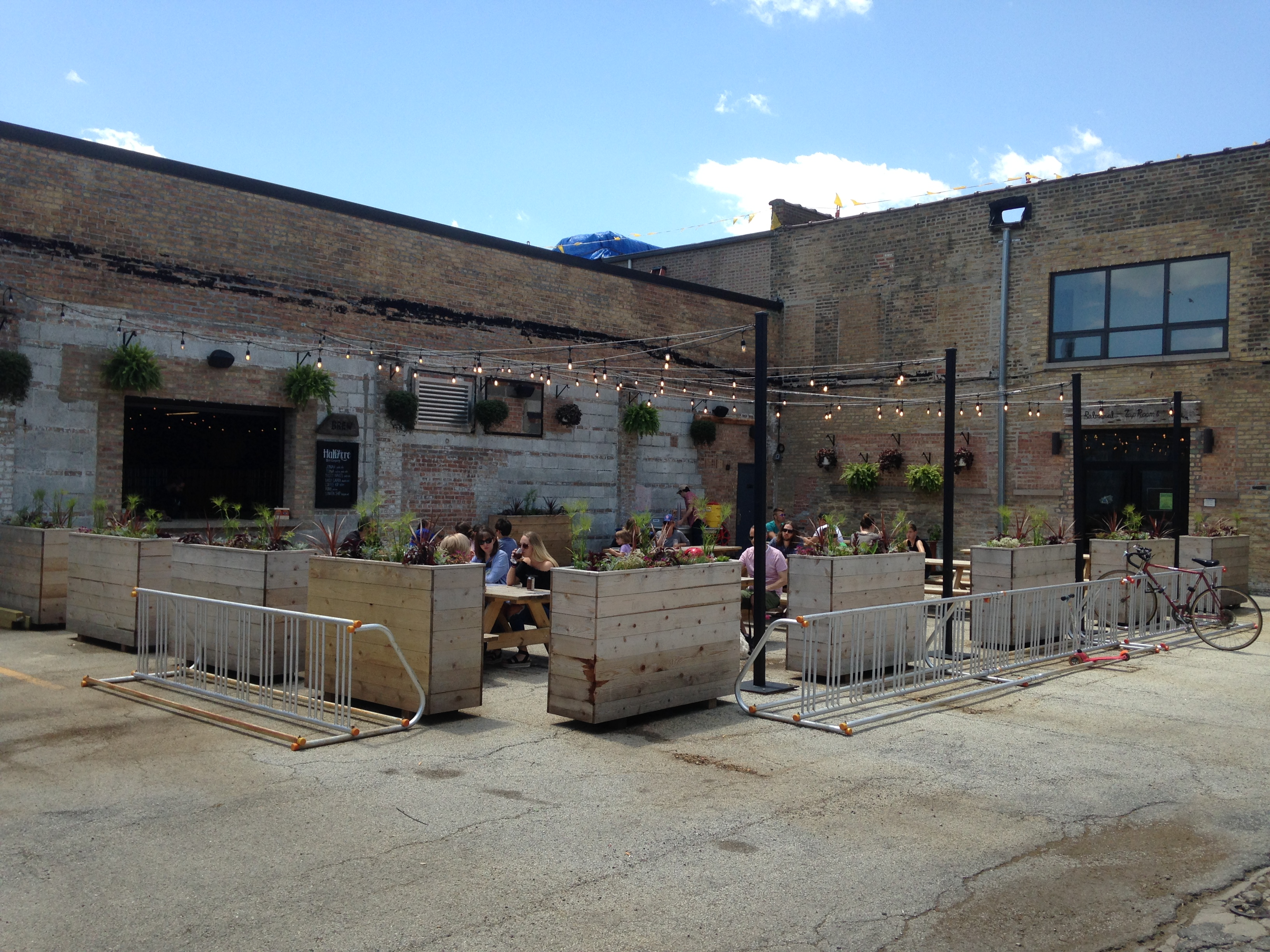
The Half Acre brewpub on Balmoral Avenue in 2018

Half Acre Beer Company is a brewery in Chicago, Illinois, United States. The company was founded by Gabriel Magliaro in 2006, with its office located in Chicago. The recipes for the beers were developed in Chicago and the beer was initially brewed at Sand Creek Brewery in Black River Falls, Wisconsin. Half Acre's first beer, Half Acre Lager, debuted in August 2007.

== History ==
In March 2009, Half Acre Beer began production in its own brewery on Lincoln Avenue in the North Center neighborhood of Chicago. Building upon its growing popularity, a tap room adjacent to the brewhouse opened in 2012. A 2013, Chicago magazine annual poll named the Half Acre tap room the city's eighth best bar. Because of its continued success, a kitchen was added in January 2016, completing the transition to a full service brew pub. In 2015, the brewery expanded by opening a second, larger brewhouse and pub on Balmoral Avenue in the Bowmanville neighborhood of Chicago, approximately a mile and a half from the Lincoln Avenue facility. In 2021, they consolidated operations into the Balmoral Avenue location, closing the Lincoln Avenue facility.

Since 2007, the company has sponsored the local bicycle club Half Acre Cycling.

To minimize waste from brewing, the company challenged engineering students from Northwestern University to find the best ways to reduce or reuse byproducts.

== Beer ==
Half Acre brews six year-round beers, three seasonal beers, as well as monthly special releases and small batches for its taproom and beer garden.

When asked about the citrus flavor of Half Acre Lager, Magliaro has said that the only thing in his beer is water, yeast and "lots and lots" of German malt and Saaz hops.

In October 2014, Half Acre Heyoka won a silver medal at the Great American Beer Festival in the category of American-style IPA. In January 2015, Heyoka was renamed Senita after members of the American Indian Movement objected to the term "heyoka" being used for commercial purposes. In June 2015. the beer was renamed again, to Gone Away, after another brewery claimed that the name Senita infringed too closely on the name of one of its beers.

Half Acre Beers
Name	Style	ABV %	IBU	Notes
Daisy Cutter	West Coast pale ale	5.2		Available year-round
Akari Shogun	Wheat ale	5.5		Seasonal
Lead Feather	Black Ale	6.0		Seasonal
Pony Pilsner	Pilsner	5.8		Available year-round
Gone Away	India Pale Ale	7.0		Seasonal
Alpenglow	Winter dark ale	5.0		Seasonal
Baumé	Rye stout	7.0	60	Seasonal
Beer Hates Astronauts	India Pale Ale			Seasonal
Big Hugs	Imperial stout	10.0		Seasonal
Bodem	India Pale Ale	5.7		Available year-round
Callow Knife	Pale ale	5.0		Seasonal
Canyon of Heroes	India Pale Ale	6.1		Seasonal
Chocolate Camaro	Stout	6.0		Seasonal
Chub Step	Porter	6.0		Seasonal
Smoking Gull	Hazy pale ale	5.2		Seasonal
Crystal Norde	Baltic porter	7.0		Seasonal
Double Daisy Cutter	Pale ale			Seasonal
Ginger twin	India-style red ale			Seasonal
The Grotto	Extra pale ale	4.5		Seasonal
Half Acre Lager (Fader)	Lager			Available year-round
The Hammer, the Bullet, & the Vise	English brown ale	5.0		Seasonal
Lager Town	Oktoberfest	6.0		Seasonal (fall)
Mr. Ouroboros	German pale ale	6.0		Seasonal
Navaja	Double India Pale Ale	9.5		Seasonal
Over Ale	Brown ale	6.0		Seasonal
Quakerbridge	Barley wine	10.0		Seasonal
Space	India Pale Ale	6.7		Seasonal
Sticky Fat	American dark ale	6.3		Seasonal
Thunder & Son	Brown ale	10.0		Seasonal
Tome	Hazy Pale ale			Available year-round
Tend	Unfiltered American Ale	5.8		Seasonal (winter)
Vallejo	India Pale Ale	6.7		Seasonal (spring)

== See also ==
- List of breweries in Illinois
