= Buona =

American restaurant chain

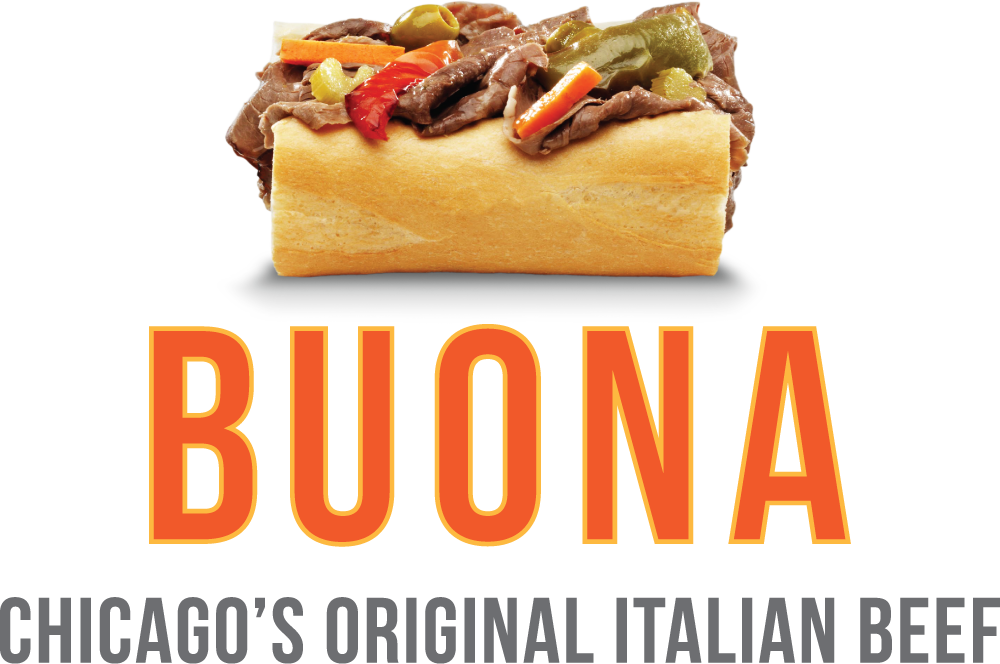
- Type: Private
- Industry: Restaurants
- Founded: 1981; 45 years ago, in Berwyn, Illinois
- Founders: Joe Buonavolanto Sr.; Peggy Buonavolanto
- Headquarters: Berwyn, Illinois, United States
- Number of locations: 34 (31 restaurants, and 3 catering facilities)
- Area served: Illinois; Indiana; Tennessee; Wisconsin
- Key people: Joe Buonavolanto Jr. (president & CEO); Don Buonavolanto (Director of Operations); Carlo Buonavolanto (CFO); Jim Buonavolanto (Director of Purchasing); John Buonavolanto (Director of Beef Production)
- Products: Italian beef, Chicago-style hot dog, Pizza
- Revenue: $81 million (2014)
- Website: buona.com

Buona (sometimes referred to as Buona Beef) is an American restaurant chain that specializes in Italian beef, along with other dishes such as pizzas, and Chicago-style hot dogs. The company was founded in 1981 by Joe and Peggy Buonavolanto. Since its opening, the company has launched a total of 18 restaurants and 2 catering facilities in the Chicagoland area. The company is still run by three generations of the Buonavolanto family.

== History ==
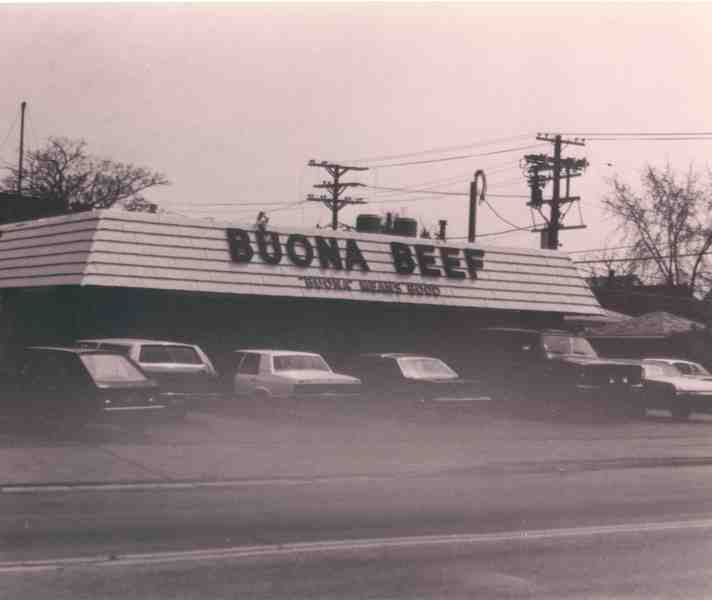
Original Buona restaurant in Berwyn, Illinois (1981)

The first Buona restaurant was opened in 1981 in Berwyn, Illinois, by Joe Buonavolanto Sr. and his wife Peggy. The two worked in the restaurant along with their sons Carlo, John, Joe Jr., Jimmy, Don, and their daughter, Joanne. The Buonavolanto Family took out a second mortgage on their home in order to open the business. Joe Sr. dug the actual foundation for the restaurant while Peggy Buonavolanto concocted The Original Italian Beef recipe with the help of their Uncle "Junior" (Carl Buonavolanto), proprietor of Chicago’s iconic Mr. Beef on Orleans Street. The company name is taken from the last name Buonavolanto and the word "Buona" in Italian translates to "Good".

Joe Sr. opened the original restaurant as a part-time venture to fulfill a dream of going into business with his sons. The restaurant grew to the point that the sons began to leave their full-time jobs in order to maintain the business. They began to plan expansion as early as 1985, opening Buona Catering, a subsidiary of the company. Joe Sr. became a general contractor to save money and the company’s second location was launched in Oak Park, Illinois, in 1989, with catering expansion to come in 1991. In addition to stores in the Chicago metropolitan area, the company's plans were to open stores first in Wisconsin and Indiana, since people from these states have visited and lived in Illinois and are more familiar with the restaurant's concept. Buona announced plans to begin franchising beginning in 2016.

Buona began expanding rapidly in 2015, with five restaurants under construction or contract. The chain has become an attraction over the years, with its 15th restaurant having people camping overnight in St. Charles, Illinois, for the opening. The 16th Buona restaurant opened in the fourth quarter of 2015 in Harwood Heights, Illinois. Buona began construction of its first Chicago-based restaurant, a $2.8 million project, in the community of Beverly in November 2015 which opened in March 2016.

== Products ==
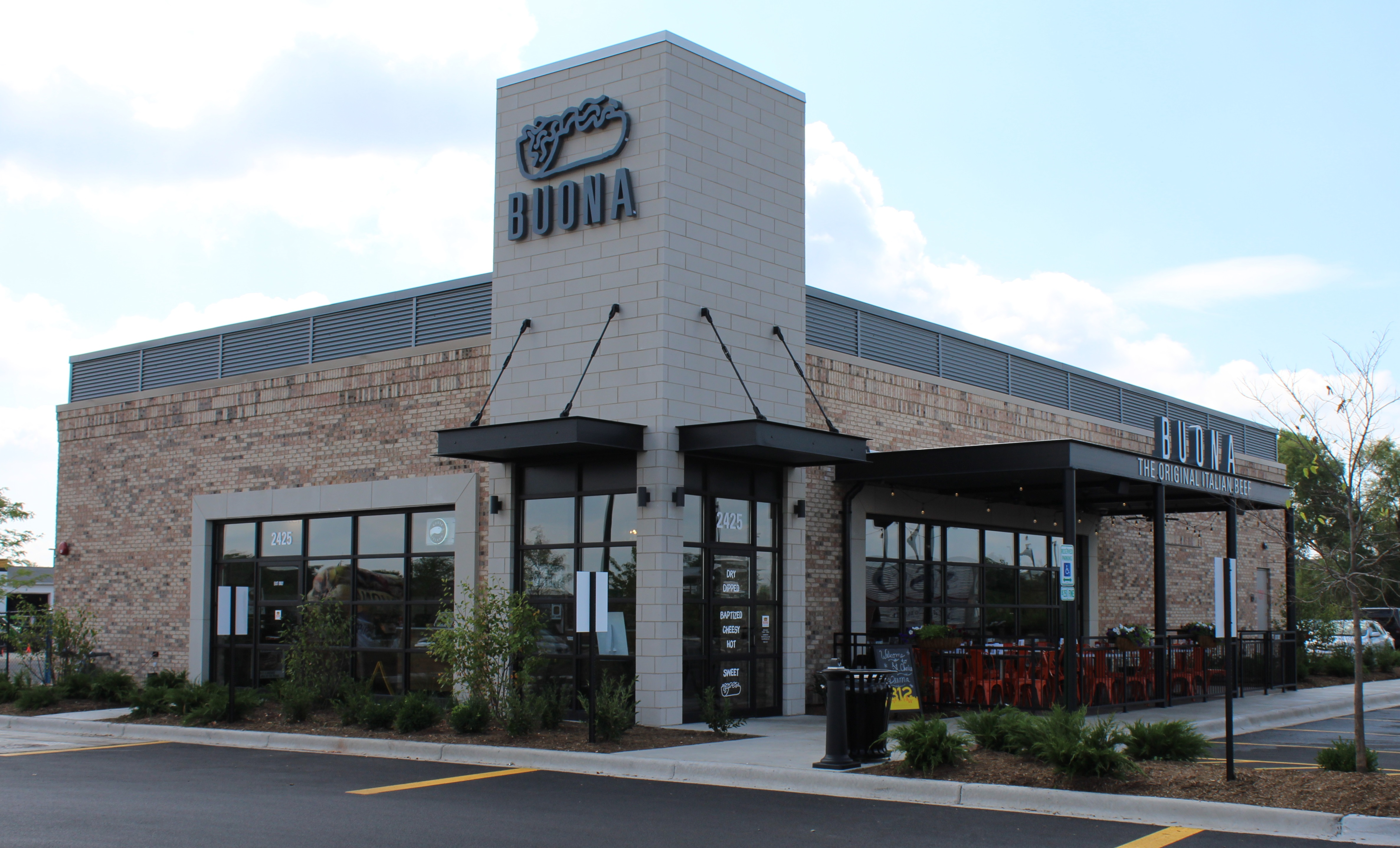
St. Charles location of Buona. Image taken in 2015.

Buona Βeef specializes in Italian beef, but it also serves other meals including Chicago-style hot dogs, pizzas, burgers, salads, soups, paninis, desserts, and specialty beer and wine. Along with its restaurant services, the company has facilities able to provide event catering services.

In addition to the Buona chain, the company co-owns and operates five full-service restaurants. These restaurants include Downers Grove–based Barbakoa and Brett Favre's Steakhouse in Green Bay, Wisconsin. It also operates Authentic Brands of Chicago, its own 30,000 square foot beef production facility.

== Awards and recognition ==
The Berwyn Development Corporation awarded the company with the Berwyn's Best award for its combo sandwich. It has also been recognized for having the best Italian beef in Chicago by the Chicago Tribune. It also received a Reader's Choice Award from The Daily Herald in 2015 and ranked #2 on USA Today's list of Best Italian Beef in Illinois for 2016.
