= Stevens Point Brewery =

Regional brewery in Stevens Point, Wisconsin

Coordinates: 44°30′38″N 89°34′33″W

- Industry: Alcoholic beverage
- Founded: 1857
- Headquarters: Stevens Point, Wisconsin; United States
- Products: Beer
- Website: http://www.pointbeer.com

Stevens Point Brewery is a regional American brewery located in Stevens Point, Wisconsin. The brewery is the fifth-oldest continuously operating brewery and the third-oldest privately owned brewery in the nation.

== History ==
The company was founded in 1857 by George Ruder and Frank Wahle. In 1864, the company provided its beer to the troops during the American Civil War. The brewery was subsequently sold to Andrew and Jacob Lutz in 1867. The Lutz family continued operations until it was sold to Gustav Kuenzel in 1897. The company was then organized as the Gustav Kuenzel Brewing Company in 1901. The following year, it was renamed the Stevens Point Brewing Company. Ludwig Korfman purchased a controlling interest in the company in 1924 and reorganized the company as the Stevens Point Beverage Company. The company faced local competition from the mid-1860s through the Prohibition era of the 1920s, when the remaining competition went out of business. During the 1950s, the brewery began using cans in production. In 1973, Point Special brand beer was rated the top American beer in a taste test as reported by Mike Royko, a prominent columnist for the Chicago Daily News. By the 1970s the company was owned by Felix and Ken Shibilski. In 1990, the company first began selling its product outside Wisconsin, in Illinois, Indiana, Michigan, and Minnesota. In 1992, the Shibilskis sold the company to Chicago-based Barton Beers Ltd. The new ownership was unique for Barton in that Point beer was its only domestic product line, with all of its other offerings being imports. The company planned to tie sales to its Mexican brand, Corona, but when that brand's sales exploded, the Point brand became a distraction. In 2002, the company was sold back to Wisconsin ownership by Milwaukee-based real estate developers Joe Martino and Jim Wiechmann. That same year, the company introduced gourmet sodas to its beverage list. In 2003, Point Special won the gold medal at the Great American Beer Festival in the premium lager category. In 2005, the company bought four beer brands from the James Page Brewing Company. By 2008, the company's products were distributed to 18 different states. For nearly 20 years, the company brewed and bottled Karl Strauss Brewing Company brands until production was moved in January, 2009. The company expanded its annual brewery capacity to 100,000 barrels in 2011, and to 150,000 barrels in 2013.

== Sales volume ==
As of 2025, the company is ranked the 23rd-largest craft brewer in the country and 35th largest overall.

== Awards ==
The brewer has won awards several times including the category for American-style amber three times for their Point Amber Classic brand (Gold in 1996; Silver in 2002; Gold in 2012), and three times in the Schwarzbier category for their Point 2012 Black Ale (Silver in 2011; Silver in 2012; Gold in 2013). The brewer has also won awards for other brands in its portfolio.

== Brands ==
=== Alcoholic beverages ===
- Point Special Lager
- Point Bock Seasonal
- Point Amber Classic
- Point Cascade Pale Ale
- Point Belgian White Wheat Ale
- Point Onyx Black Ale
- Point Three Kings Kolsh Style Ale
- Point Nude Beach Summer Wheat
- Point Oktoberfest
- Point St. Benedict's Winter Ale
- Point Drop Dead Blonde
- Point Smiley Blue Pils
- Point Beyond the Pale IPA
- Whole Hog Raspberry Saison
- Whole Hog Russian Imperial Stout
- Whole Hog Six Hop India Pale Ale (IPA)
- Whole Hog Scotch Ale
- Whole Hog Barley Wine Style Ale
- Whole Hog Pumpkin Ale
- JP Casper White Stout
- JP Yabba Dhabba Chai Tea Porter
- JP Ould Sod Irish Red India Pale Ale (IPA)
- JP Accapella Gluten-Free Pale Ale
- Ciderboys First Press
- Ciderboys Magic Apple
- Ciderboys Peach County
- Ciderboys Raspberry Smash
- Ciderboys Cranberry Road
- Ciderboys Mad Bark

Baraboo Brewing Company brand beers, produced for Hy-Vee supermarkets.

- Woodpecker Wheat
- Lumberjack IPA
- Red Granite Lager
- Snow Drift Black IPA
- Bonfire Märzen

Former production

- Point Holiday Beer (1935–1940)
- Prize Beer (1935–1940)
- Big Charlie Beer (1937–1944)
- Amber Prize Beer (1939–1950)
- Karl Strauss Brewing Company brands (1989–2009)

=== Gourmet sodas ===
- Point Premium Root Beer
- Point Premium Concord Grape Soda
- Point Premium Diet Root Beer
- Point Premium Zero Sugar Root Beer
- Point Premium Vanilla Cream Soda
- Point Premium Black Cherry Cream Soda
- Point Premium Orange Cream Soda
- Point Premium Kitty Cocktail Soda
