= Reisch Brewing Co. =

Former brewery in Springfield, Illinois

Reisch Beer
- Location: Springfield, Illinois, USA
- Opened: 1849
- Closed: 1966
- Key people: Franz Sales Reisch

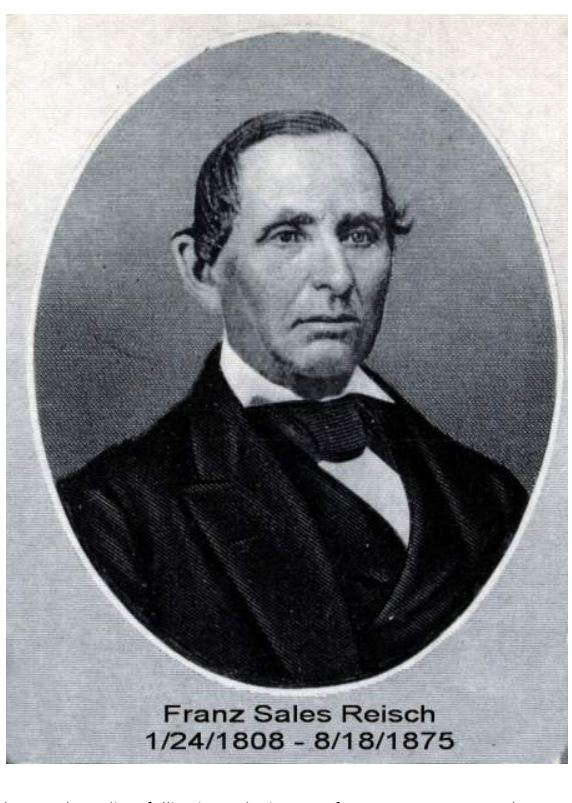
Founder Franz Reisch

The Reisch Brewing Co was a brewery established in the city of Springfield, Illinois by Franz Sales Reisch in 1849.

== History ==
=== Founding ===
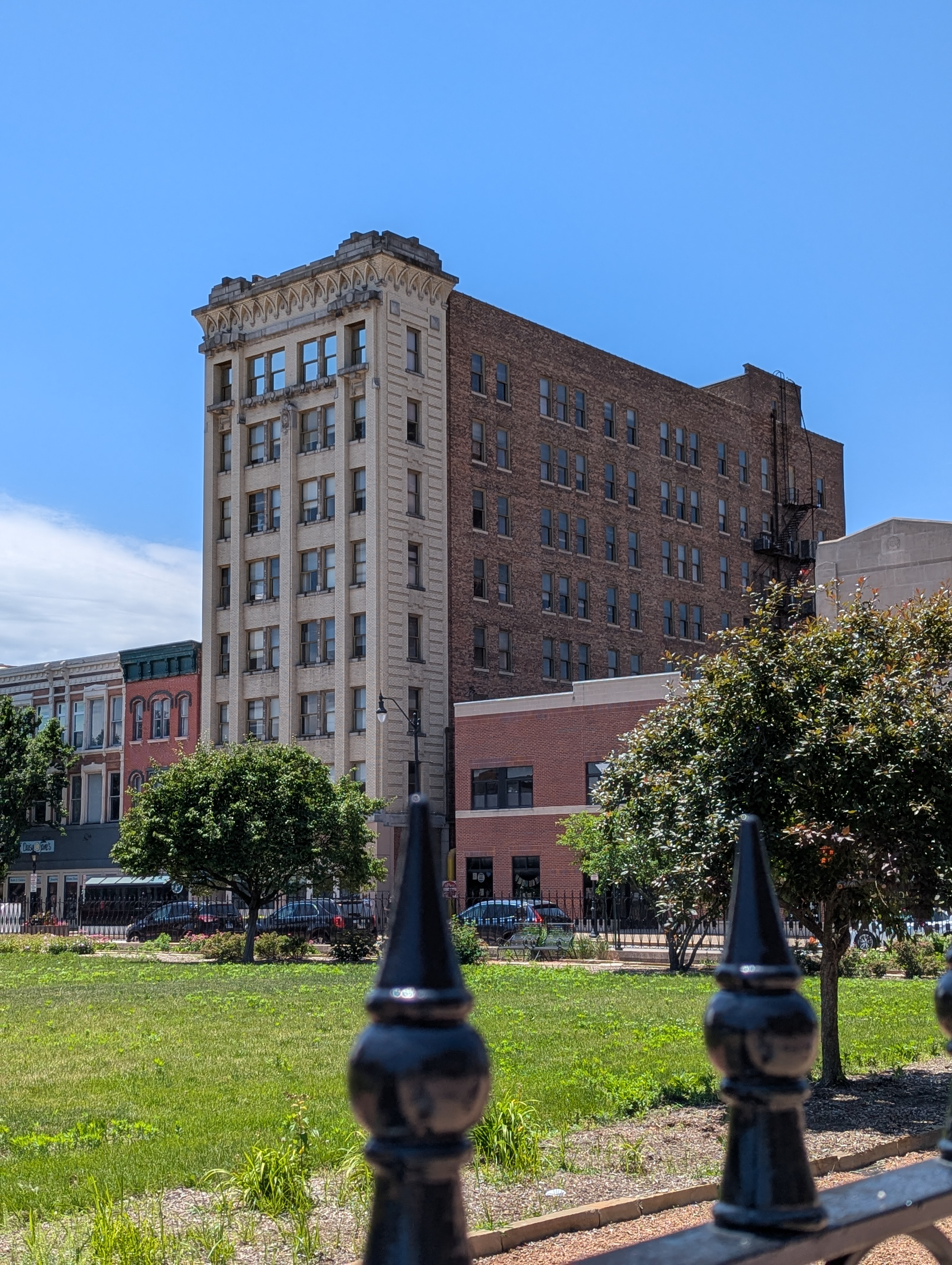
The Reisch Building in Springfield, former offices for Reisch

Franz Sales Reisch was born in 1808 in Baden on the Rhine, at Niederhausen January 19, 1809. At the age of 17, he apprenticed at a brewery in France. Reisch emigrated to New Orleans, Louisiana in 1832. Unsatisfied with the water quality of New Orleans, Reisch moved to Cincinnati where he found there were already a large number of breweries. He headed south west on the Ohio River and north up the Mississippi. He caught the Illinois River and settled in Beardstown, IL where he worked as a cooper making wheels and wooden barrels. He eventually settled in rural Sangamon County near present day Pleasant Plains, IL.

Finally settling in Springfield, Illinois in November 1833. Reisch bought a parcel of land on Kelley Branch in 1847 in Springfield, IL . He began selling beer in 1849.

=== Prohibition ===
The Reisch brewery operated until 1920 when it was forced to switch to making soda water and non-alcoholic malt beverages because of Prohibition. It went back to macking beers in 1933 and stayed open until it shut its doors permanently in 1966.

=== Return ===
For years the Reisch family was pestered by locals, especially a brewery enthusiast and breweriana collector by the name of Daryl Ponder, to bring the beer back. A group of breweriana collectors were finally able to convince George Reisch to brew the companies flagship beer again. Edward Reisch, the last Reisch family brew master was turning 100. He had suffered a stroke and was non verbal but living in a nursing home near St. Louis. George agreed to brew the beer which he obtained the complete recipe from Edward before he had the stroke. George wanted to keep the recipe in the family and potentially hand it down to his son Patrick who is also a brewer at Goose island Brewery in Chicago. George agreed to Ponders suggestion that the beer be brewed for Ed's 100th birthday and if good, people like it, a non profit organization can sell the beer. All profits will go to Springfield IL charities. The mission has expanded beyond Springfield several times but all in all, the mission is to help save and preserve IL history.

Reisch Charities resurrected the Reisch Gold Top Beer brand in March 2019 using the original recipe brewed by George Reisch and Patrick Reisch. Reisch Charities was founded November 2018 by board members George Reisch, Daryl Ponder, Vince Salvo, Jim Reisch, Jeff DeGeal and Rob Malawy. Gary Zimmerman, Roy Mayfield and Chuck Costello were added after the initial reintroduction. All of the beer proceeds will be used for Springfield charities focusing on preserving Springfield heritage sites.

== See also ==
- List of defunct breweries in the United States
