= Gino's East =

American deep-dish pizza chain

Coordinates: 41.89602°N 87.62303°W

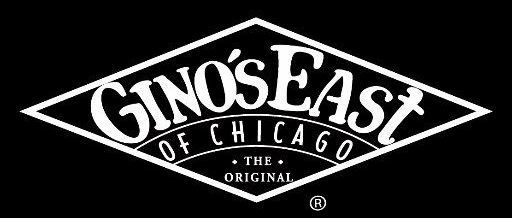

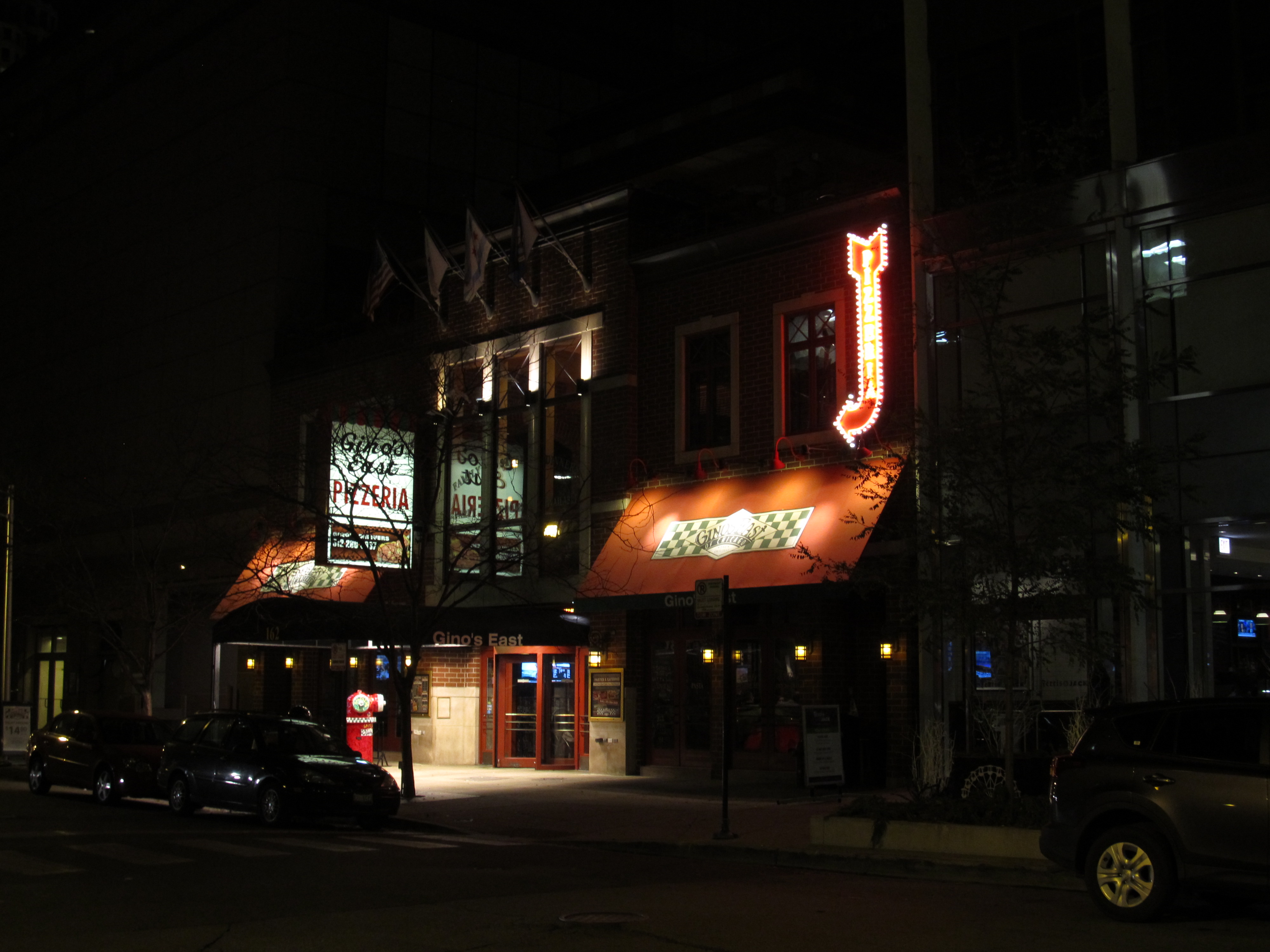
- Industry: Restaurant
- Founded: 1966
- Headquarters: Chicago, Illinois, United States
- Number of locations: 10
- Products: Deep Dish Pizza, Tavern Style Thin Crust, Salads, Pastas, Sandwiches
- Website: Official website

Gino's East is a Chicago-based restaurant chain specializing in deep-dish pizza. Two cab drivers opened the original location in 1966.

== History ==
Gino's East was opened in 1966 by Sam Levine, Fred Bartoli, and George Loverde. Previously, they had opened the original Gino's in 1960 at 930 N. Rush Street.

They bought a building on East Superior Street "but didn't know what to put in it," Levine told a Tribune reporter in 1983, when the restaurant was sold to new owners. "Then someone said, 'Put pizza in it.' But we didn't know pizza from nothing."

Gino's East served deep dish pizza at 162 E. Superior St., a block from the Magnificent Mile, from 1966 until 2000. In 2000, the building was torn down due to structural issues. The restaurant moved to the 600 block of North Wells just two days later.

In 2003, Buona Beef built a new building at 162 E Superior St. After a few years, Buona reached out to the president of Gino's East, Jeff Himmel, in hopes of selling them the new property. Gino's returned to their original location, in a new building, in June 2006.

=== Alice Mae Redmond ===
Although the original owners were Italian (Loverde was born in Sicily and Bartoli was a first generation Italian American), they did not create the recipe for Gino's deep dish. Alice Mae Redmond, a Black woman originally working as a cook at Pizzeria Uno, was hired by the friends. Alice Mae had worked at competing Pizzeria Uno for 17 years, where she developed a special dough recipe. She claimed that she did not like the crust at Uno's, saying it was "too hard to push".

Alice Mae continued to work at the original Gino's and Gino's East as a pizza cook and recipe developer for 29 years, retiring in 1989. Her nephew, Glenn Hudley, continued to work as a manager.

=== Writing on the walls ===
Gino's East is famous for allowing their customers to write on their walls. The tradition started by accident in the 1970s when customers would use forks and knives to carve their initials into the tables. In an effort to save their dinnerware, employees began to encourage customers to write on the walls and even provided them with pens and markers. Now, graffiti covers every inch of the restaurant. Newer locations and franchises do not allow their customers to write on their walls, making the flagship at 162 E Superior St. the only location that still upholds the tradition.

=== 2015 5 Rabbit beer batch purchase ===
In 2015, 5 Rabbit Brewery announced that it would cease doing business with Donald Trump because of his statements about Mexican immigrants. The brewery had brewed a batch of beer especially for a bar in Trump Tower Chicago, but ceased shipping the beer to the bar and stated that the beer would be renamed to 'Chinga Tu Pelo' (Fuck Your Hair), in an apparent reference to Trump's hair. A few days after that, Gino's East purchased that batch of beer from the brewery.

== Deep-dish pizza ingredients ==
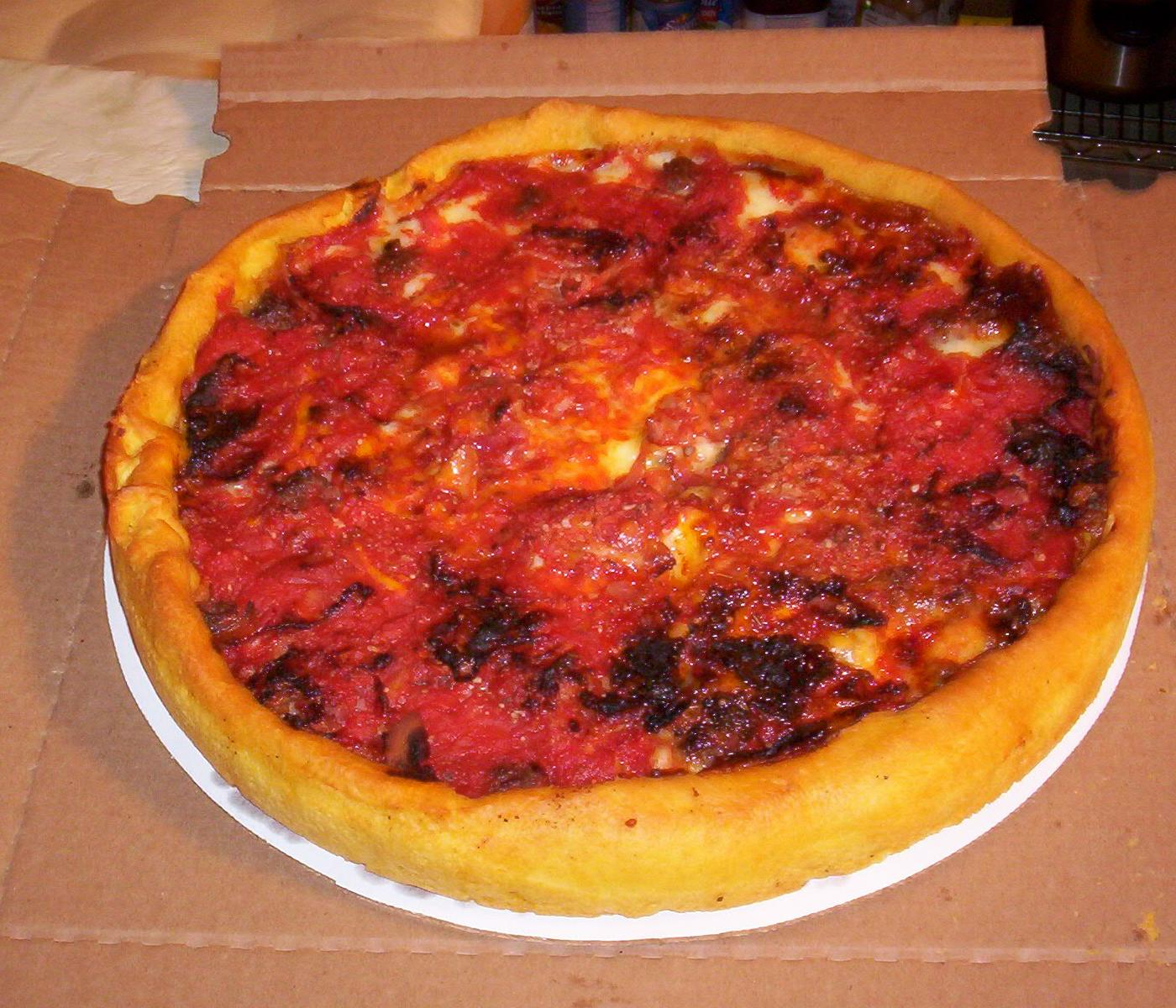
A Gino's East deep-dish pizza

Gino's buys its sausage from a Chicago-based family.

For its vegan pizza, it uses vegan cheese from Daiya.

== Gino's Brewing Co. ==
Founded in 2015, Gino's Brewing Co. opened inside of the Gino's East River North location in 2015. McMahon focused on creating beers that followed traditional brewing methods, and leans towards lower alcohol by volume beers.

In 2015, all four of the brewery's flagships won medals at the U.S. Open Beer Championship, winning over 4000 submissions. Lasalle St. Lager won a gold, Broken English won silver, Killarney Connection won bronze and Gino's Pale Ale won bronze.

== Expansion ==
The company subsequently opened other locations in the Chicago Metropolitan Area, including Wheaton, Naperville, Orland Park, Rolling Meadows, Lake Zurich, Deerfield, Oak Lawn, and Highland, Indiana. Another location opened in downtown Lake Geneva, Wisconsin, a popular tourist destination near Illinois. The Oak Lawn location closed in 2008. The Naperville location closed in late 2010, the Deerfield location closed in 2012 and the Rolling Meadows location in 2013. There was one Gino's East location that operated in Manhattan Beach, California, but closed in 1991.

Additionally, Gino's East operates a mail-order business, where patrons can order frozen pizzas and have them shipped overnight. The company opened its first restaurant located outside the Chicago area in Granger, Indiana, but closed it in 2012.

The restaurant eventually moved from its Superior Street location into another space at 633 North Wells Street (in the former Chicago location of Planet Hollywood). The tradition of writing on the walls, however, remains the same in the new location. The original location on Superior Street reopened in 2007. In 2014, the River North location moved just south of 633 N. Wells to 500 N. LaSalle Street, a building previously occupied by nightclub Lasalle Power Co.

In 2014 the company announced expansion into Texas (ATX Brands acquired franchising rights to operate the chain outside the State of Illinois), with the first location outside of Chicago to be located in The Woodlands with a November 2014 opening, followed by a January 2015 opening in Willowbrook, Houston. A San Antonio location opened sometime within the first quarter of 2015 along with an Arlington, TX location. A Downtown Austin location opened in late June 2015. The locations in Texas (Houston, San Antonio, DFW Metroplex) are former Bikinis Sports Bar and Grill locations which were company-owned by ATX Brands.

=== Nashville ===
In 2019 Gino's East opened its first Tennessee location in Nashville. Located at 311 3rd Avenue S. The new location opened in the SoBro neighborhood of Nashville, on March 14, National Pi Day. The Nashville location boasted a large outdoor patio with jumbo yard games (Jenga, horseshoes and cornhole) a late night pizza window and a dual inside and outside bar. Murals by Nashville artist Brett Hunter can also be found throughout the restaurant.

=== Los Angeles ===
In 2020 a franchise was opened in Los Angeles, located at 12924 Riverside Dr. Sherman Oaks, CA. The new location took over a building that originally housed Rock 'n Pies.

Today Gino's East has 10 locations.
