= Argus Brewery =

American brewing company

- Location: Chicago, Illinois, United States
- Opened: 2009
- Closed: 2020
- Key people: Bob Jensen
- Annual production volume: 2,500 US beer barrels (2,900 hL) in 2015

Argus Brewery was a brewing company located on the south side of Chicago, at the edge of the Roseland community and the historic Pullman District. Founded in 2009, the brewery produced beer for multiple Chicago restaurants as well as its own self-named brand. Argus Brewery closed in March 2020.

== History ==
The brewery was housed in a century-old building that originally served as the Schlitz Brewery stable. Schlitz constructed its largest facility across the tracks from the Pullman Company to provide beer to the 10,000 area workers who were forced to live in a dry community.

In 2016, Ted Furman became the brewmaster at Argus Brewing, and began to reproduce recipes from his defunct brand Golden Prairie. That same year the Argus Lager won a bronze award at the World Beer Cup. In 2018, the Golden Prairie Doppel Alt was awarded a Gold Medal at the Great American Beer Festival. Argus brand original craft beers and Golden Prairie brand beers were available in local taverns and stores, with most sales coming from taphouses.

In late 2012 the brewery teamed up with Jarrett Payton, son of the late NFL Hall of Famer Walter Payton, to create the Jarrett Payton All-American Wheat Ale. The limited release beer was developed by Payton and the Jensen family. Argus also brewed beers honoring other notable Chicagoans, including the Paschke Pilsner for beloved local artist Ed Paschke, and the Tuskegee Airmen Pursuit as homage to Jack Lyle, one of the legendary Tuskegee Airmen. Argus Brewery also briefly contract-brewed for Baderbrau, one of Chicago’s oldest craft brewing companies.

Argus Brewery closed in 2020, due in part to the COVID-19 pandemic in Illinois. The brewery stopped brewing on March 28, twelve days after bars and restaurants were ordered to close to stem the spread of the virus in Chicago.
