= Peacock Brewery =

Buildings in Rockford, Illinois, US

- U.S. National Register of Historic Places
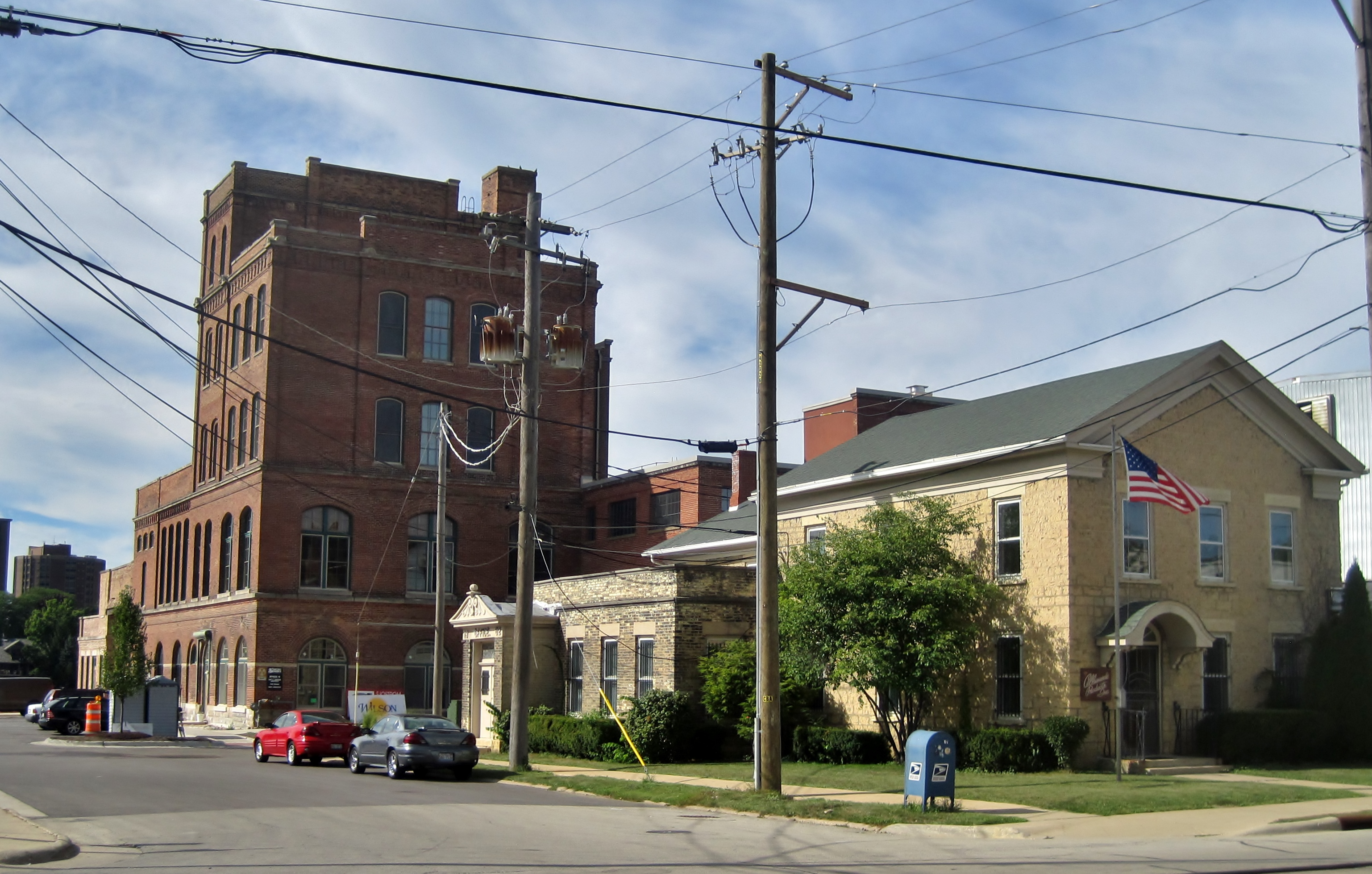

- Location within Illinois Location within the United States
- Location: 200 Prairie and 500 North Madison Streets, Rockford, Illinois
- Coordinates: 42°16′23″N 89°5′12″W
- Architect: Widmann, Walsh & Boisscher
- Architectural style: Greek Revival (house), Classical Revival (brewhouse)
- NRHP reference No.: 11000851
- Added to NRHP: November 22, 2011

Peacock Brewery, also known at times as the Rockford Brewing Company and the Rock River Brewing Company, is a historic pair of buildings on the east side of the Rock River in Rockford, Illinois, United States. It was Rockford's largest brewery for almost seventy years.

== Origin ==
British immigrant Jonathan Peacock moved to Rockford, Illinois in 1849. Peacock had learned the brewing trade in England before working in Chicago's Lill & Diversey brewery. He purchased a house on Madison Street and began to brew beer in the back. Peacock ground malt in a coffee mill, brewed it in a wash boilers, and delivered his product to customers via wheelbarrow. With the connection of the Galena and Chicago Union Railroad to Rockford in 1852, Peacock was ready to serve the droves of immigrants that followed.

By 1857, Peacock's operation had grown to a point where he could no longer simply brew out of the back of his home. He built a new brewhouse next door to meet demand. In the summer of 1894, a fire ravaged the brewhouse. Peacock immediately rebuilt, but died two years later. His sons, Frank and Edward, inherited the business. Under their leadership, the brewery produced over 20,000 barrels of beer per year. The most popular beer was Nikolob. Both sons died of tuberculosis in 1899, and the brewery was sold to Croatian immigrant John V. Petritz.

== 1900s ==
John Petritz had moved out west to Montana in the 1880s and made a fortune in liquor production and distribution. After he decided to move back east, he decided to purchase a large brewery. With the Peacock Brewery under his ownership, he hired St. Louis architects Widmann, Walsh & Boisscher to design a large, modern brewhouse. Replacing the older brewhouse, the $100,000 brewhouse had state-of-the-art technology and advanced production to 75,000 barrels a year. Petritz renamed the company the Rockford Brewing Company. He purchased a bottling company in 1900, replacing it with a newer building in 1902.

=== Prohibition ===
Petritz struggled to keep up with new liquor license and tax laws in the early 20th century. By 1916, he had accrued 270 violations and faced fines exceeding $2,000. In 1917, Winnebago County passed a law enforcing prohibition. Petritz ignored the law and continued to produce beer at his brewhouse. John V. Petritz, his son Frank, and manager Earl Blewfeld were arrested that year for the violations. Judge of the United States District Court for the Northern District of Illinois Kenesaw Mountain Landis oversaw the trial, which became a local media sensation. Petritz was forced to pay a combined $15,000 to the city and county in a settlement for 1,250 violations of liquor laws. The license for the Rockford Brewing Company expired in 1918 and was not renewed.

=== Rock River Brewing Company ===
Petritz used the old brewing buildings to start a new warehousing business. Another one of his sons, John G., tried to restart the brewery after prohibition ended. Sold under the name Petritz, the beer was produced in Chicago and bottled in the Rockford buildings. One of his partners, Samuel Hirsch, bought out the other partners in 1937 and changed the name to the Rock River Brewing Company. Producing Coronet Old Vat and Grand Prize beers, the brewery finally came to a closure in 1945.

== 2000s ==
On November 22, 2011, the brewery buildings were recognized by the National Park Service with a listing on the National Register of Historic Places. It was highlighted as the featured property of the week.

Today, the building is undergoing renovation towards being reopened as Rockford Brewery in spring 2014. The Ice Cellar Bar, one of three event rooms has been updated with a 10-line draft system and changeable colored LED lights set into the base of the copper lined bar. The lighting overhead is now renovated to LED lights shine through a surface that resemble the blocks of ice once stored in this room. The overhead lights are made from ancient beer and liquor bottles, many produced here originally. The bar's copper lining is the same aged color as the copper vats once used in the brewing process. The beams and bar supports are raw steel as was commonly used in the industrial age.
