= Baderbräu =

Czech-style pilsner beer

- Type: Private
- Industry: Alcoholic beverage
- Founded: 1988
- Headquarters: Chicago, Illinois
- Products: Beer
- Website: baderbrau.com

Baderbräu is a Czech-style pilsner beer first brewed in 1988 by the Pavichevich Brewing Company based in Elmhurst, Illinois. After Pavichevich Brewing declared bankruptcy in 1997, Goose Island took over production of the beer until 2002. Acquisition of the Baderbräu trademark in 2010 by entrepreneur Rob Sama led to the creation of the Baderbräu Brewing Company, which resumed brewing of the Baderbräu pilsner in 2016 until it closed in 2018.

== Product description ==
Baderbräu is a Pilsner made with Czech and German Noble hops, a private strain of European lager yeast, and malts from the USA. The beer is made in accordance with Reinheitsgebot, the German purity law of 1516 which permits only those ingredients in beer and allows no additives or preservatives. ABV: 4.8%, IBU: 38.

== History ==
Baderbräu was originally brewed in the Chicago suburb of Elmhurst, Illinois from 1988 to 1997 by the Pavichevich Brewing Company (1988 to 1997), founded by Kenneth Pavichevich. In its early years, Baderbräu won acclaim, and was called by the late beer reviewer Michael Jackson “the best pilsener I’ve ever tasted in America.” By 1990, more than 200 bars in the Chicago area carried Baderbräu on tap.

Later in 1990, in an attempt to increase sales, the Pavichevich Brewing Company started making medical claims about Baderbräu, which were soon dropped after an investigation by the FDA. Additionally, the company attempted distribution into Washington state, a region that already had many microbrews, which further depleted the company's focus and resources. Boston Beer Company/Sam Adams founder Jim Koch, toured the company in 1990, saying, “He (Pavichevich) could take away all my customers in Chicago and still go bankrupt in two years.” In 1997, the Pavichevich Brewing Company filed for bankruptcy and was liquidated at auction in bankruptcy court. An investment company called Prairie Associates acquired the Baderbräu trademark and formula then promptly sold this intellectual property to Goose Island for an undisclosed sum purported to be more than $100,000 US.

In 1998, Goose Island won a silver medal with Baderbräu Pilsner for the Bohemian pilsner category in the Great American Beer Festival. Goose Island continued to brew Baderbräu until 2002.

== Baderbräu Revival ==
In 2010, entrepreneur Rob Sama registered the Baderbräu trademark and URL, sourced the original recipe (including its proprietary yeast strain), and restarted the company. Baderbräu resumed brewing on a contract basis in 2012 with the assistance of original Baderbräu pilsner creator Douglas Babcook. In 2014, Sama leased a vacant warehouse on Chicago's South Side and began renovations to convert it to a new brewery. The brewery and taproom opened in May 2016, and closed in June 2018.
