= List of breweries in California =

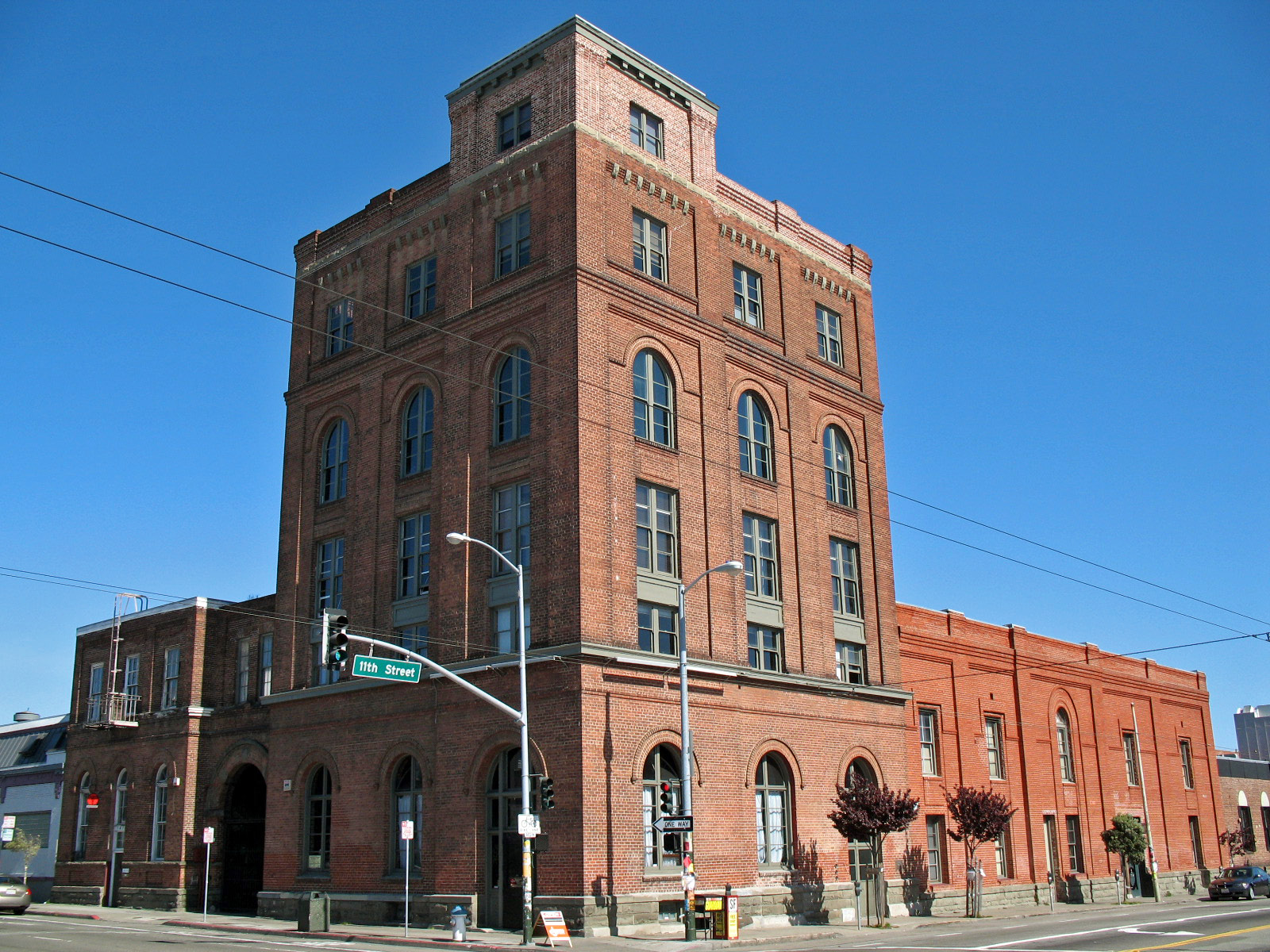
Jackson Brewing Company complex in San Francisco

This list of breweries in California, both current and defunct, includes both microbreweries and larger industrial scale breweries. Brewing companies range widely in the volume and variety of beer produced, ranging from small breweries to massive multinational conglomerates. Since 1983, California has allowed breweries to sell beer on their premises, giving rise to numerous brewpubs and microbreweries.

Breweries in California produce a wide range of beers in different styles that are marketed locally, regionally, nationally, and internationally. In 2012 California's 458 breweries, importers, brewpubs, and company-owned packagers and wholesalers employed over 7,000 people directly, and more than 109,000 others in related jobs such as wholesaling and retailing. Including people directly employed in brewing, as well as those who supply California's breweries with everything from ingredients to machinery, the total business and personal tax revenue generated by California's breweries and related industries was more than $5.1 billion. Consumer purchases of California's brewery products generated another $1.1 billion in tax revenue. In 2012, according to the Brewers Association, California ranked 1st in the number of craft breweries, and 19th per capita with 325.

For context, at the end of 2013 there were 2,822 breweries in the United States, including 2,768 craft breweries subdivided into 1,237 brewpubs, 1,412 microbreweries and 119 regional craft breweries. In that same year, according to the Beer Institute, the brewing industry employed around 43,000 Americans in brewing and distribution and had a combined economic impact of more than $246 billion.

== Breweries by county ==
=== Alameda County ===
- 21st Amendment Brewery in San Leandro
- Buffalo Bill's Brewery in Hayward, the first brewpub licensed in California since Prohibition
- Drake's Brewing Company in San Leandro
- Pyramid Breweries in Berkeley (opened in 1997, closed in 2015)
- The Rare Barrel in Berkeley
- Triple Rock Brewery and Alehouse in Berkeley
- Trumer Brauerei in Berkeley

=== Butte County ===
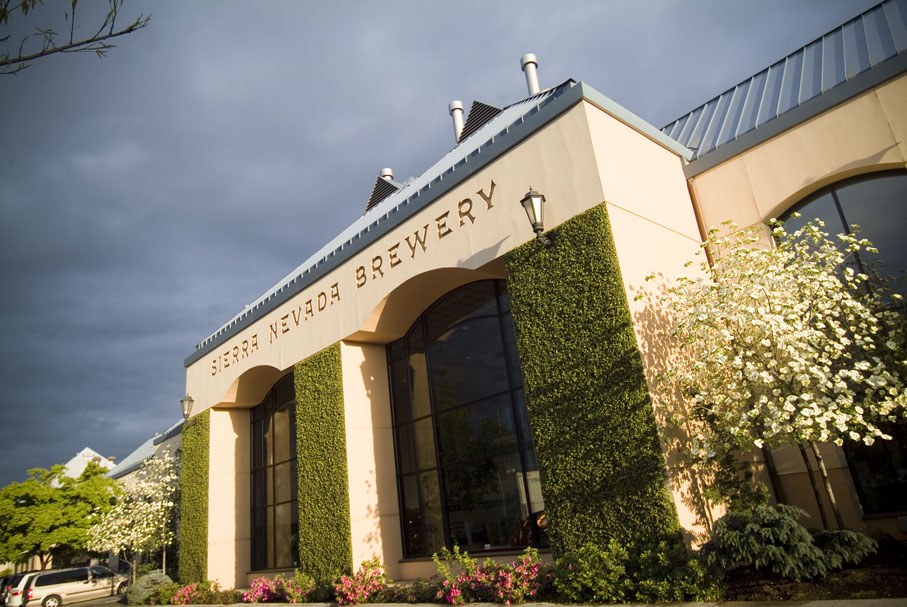
Sierra Nevada Brewing Company headquarters in Chico

- Sierra Nevada Brewing Company in Chico

=== Contra Costa County ===
- Calicraft in Walnut Creek

=== Humboldt County ===
- Eel River Brewing Company in Fortuna
- Lost Coast Brewery in Eureka
- Mad River Brewing Company in Blue Lake
- Six Rivers Brewery in McKinleyville

=== Los Angeles County ===
- Gordon Biersch Brewing Company in Burbank
- Karl Strauss Brewing Company in Universal City
- Lagunitas Brewing Company in Azusa
- MillerCoors brewery in Irwindale

=== Mendocino County ===
- Anderson Valley Brewing Company in Boonville
- Mendocino Brewing Company in Ukiah
- North Coast Brewing Company in Fort Bragg

=== Mono County ===
- Mammoth Brewing Company in Mammoth Lakes

=== Napa County ===
- Stone Brewing in Napa

=== Nevada County ===
- FiftyFifty Brewing Company in Truckee
- Nevada Brewery in Nevada City

=== Orange County ===
- Bootlegger's Brewery in Fullerton and Costa Mesa
- The Bruery in Placentia

=== Placer County ===
- Auburn Alehouse in Auburn
- Slice Beer Company in Lincoln

=== Riverside County ===
- Blind Pig Brewing Company in Temecula (opened 1994, closed 1997)
- Karl Strauss Brewing Company brewpub in Temecula

=== San Diego County ===
- AleSmith Brewing Company in Miramar, San Diego
- Alpine Beer Company in Alpine (defunct in San Diego)
- Aztec Brewing Company in Vista
- Belching Beaver Brewery, multiple locations in San Diego
- Karl Strauss Brewing Company, multiple locations county-wide
- Ballast Point Brewing Company, multiple locations in San Diego
- Green Flash Brewing Company in Mira Mesa, San Diego (defunct in San Diego)
- Mission Brewery in Middletown, San Diego
- Mother Earth Brew Co in Vista
- Pizza Port in Carlsbad and Ocean Beach, San Diego
- Saint Archer Brewing (defunct 2022)
- San Diego Brewing Company (second iteration)
- Stone Brewing in Escondido

=== San Francisco City and County ===
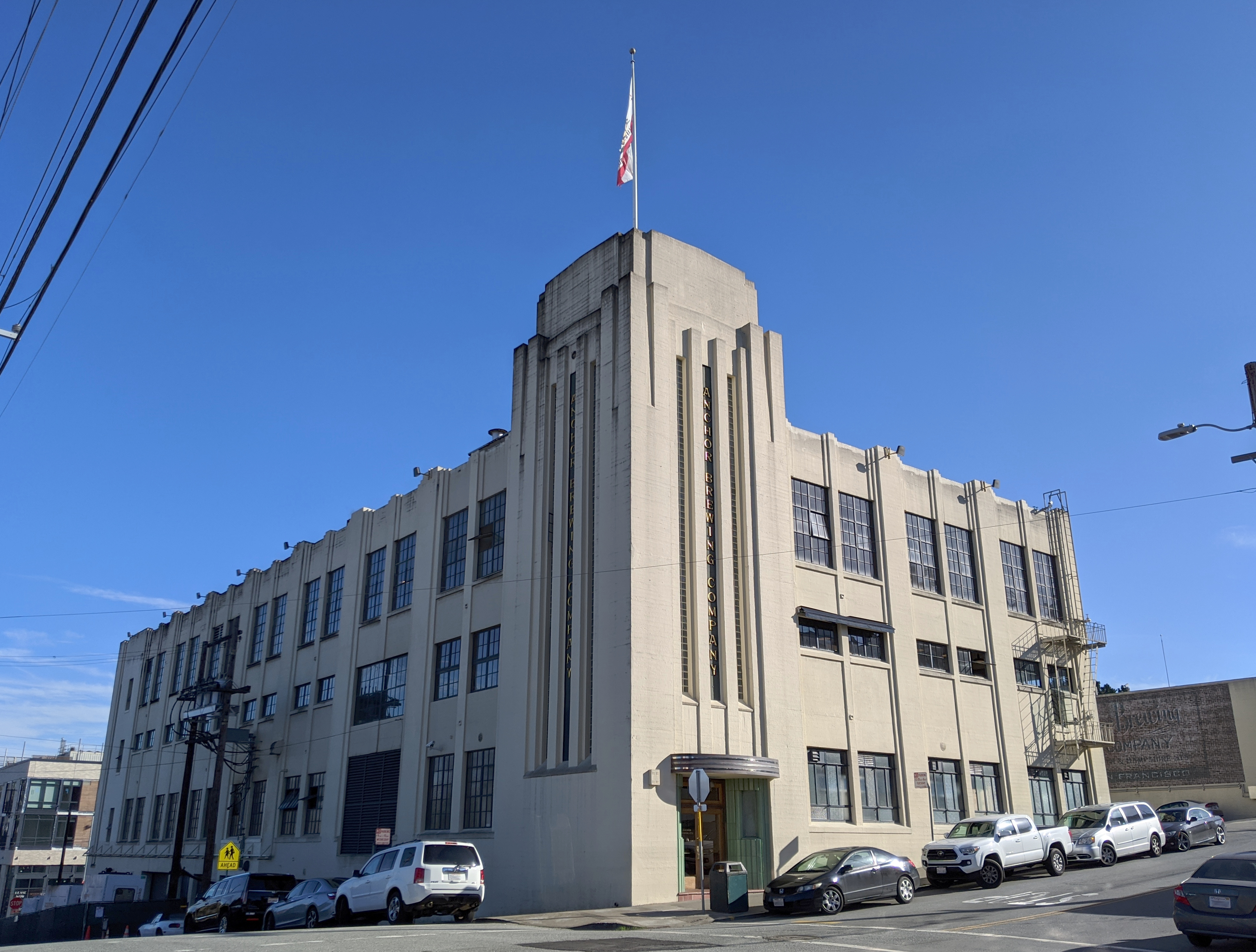
Anchor Brewing Company

- 21st Amendment Brewery
- Albion Brewery (opened 1870; closed 1919)
- Almanac Beer Company
- Anchor Brewing Company
- Beach Chalet Brewery & Restaurant
- Fort Point Beer Company
- Hamm's Brewery (opened 1954, closed 1972)
- Rainier Brewing Company (opened 1933, closed 1953)
- San Francisco Brewing Company (opened 1985, closed 2009)
- Speakeasy Ales and Lagers

=== San Luis Obispo County ===
- Firestone Walker Brewing Company in Paso Robles

=== San Mateo County ===
- Devil's Canyon Brewing Company in San Carlos

=== Santa Barbara County ===
- Figueroa Mountain Brewing Company in Buellton
- Firestone Walker Brewing Company in Buellton

=== Santa Clara County ===
- Gordon Biersch Brewing Company in San Jose
- Mayfield Brewery (opened 1868, closed 1920)

=== Siskiyou County ===
- Mt. Shasta Brewing Company in Weed

=== Solano County ===
- Anheuser-Busch InBev brewery in Fairfield

=== Sonoma County ===
- Bear Republic Brewing Company in Healdsburg
- Lagunitas Brewing Company in Petaluma
- Moonlight Brewing Company in Santa Rosa
- New Albion Brewing Company in Sonoma (opened 1976, closed 1982)
- Russian River Brewing Company in Santa Rosa
- Third Street Aleworks in Santa Rosa

=== Stanislaus County ===
- St. Stan's Brewery in Modesto

=== Yolo County ===
- Sudwerk Privatbrauerei Hubsch in Davis

== See also ==
- Beer in the United States
- History of California wine
- List of breweries in the United States
- List of microbreweries
