= 21st Amendment Brewery =

Brewery in San Leandro, California

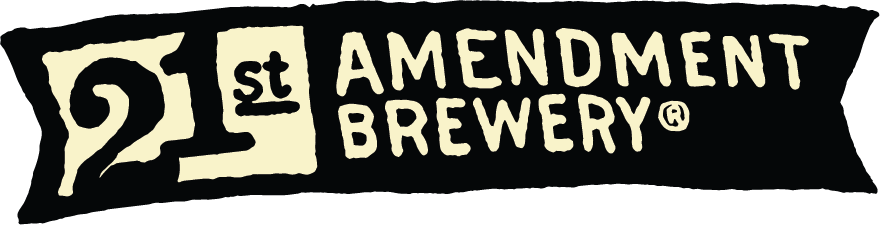
- Industry: Alcoholic beverage
- Founded: 2000
- Headquarters: 2010 Williams St; San Leandro, California, US
- Products: Beer
- Owner: Nico Freccia; Shaun O'Sullivan
- Website: 21st-amendment.com

21st Amendment Brewery was a brewery located in San Leandro, California. Their original location was a brewpub and restaurant in the South Park neighborhood of San Francisco, California, two blocks from Oracle Park. The brewery's name referred to the 21st Amendment to the U.S. Constitution, which repealed Prohibition.

21st Amendment shut down its operations in November 2025, two months after announcing the closure. In April 2026, Philadelphia-based brewery Evil Genius Beer Co. announced it had purchased 21st Amendment Brewery and would be reviving the brand.

== History ==
The brewery was founded in August 2000 by Nico Freccia and Shaun O’Sullivan. The two had developed the idea for 21st Amendment brewery while attending a brewing class together at UC Davis. O’Sullivan had previously worked as an assistant brewer at Triple Rock Brewery & Alehouse in Berkeley, 20 Tank Brewery and Steelhead Brewing in San Francisco.

The San Francisco Business Times wrote that it "made a name for itself as a local brewery and restaurant where SoMa techies could lunch and Giants fans could gather before a game." It has been voted "Best Brewpub", "Best Burger" and "Best Happy Hour" by the San Francisco Press.

Prior to 2015, 21st Amendment's retail beers were canned in Cold Spring, Minnesota. In 2012, 21st Amendment planned to case 45,000 barrels of beer, up from 28,000 in 2011. In 2014, plans were announced to open a production facility and tasting room in San Leandro, California. The production brewery started brewing in 2015 and currently has capacity at 150,000 - 180,000 barrels. In 2018 the company was named by the Brewers Association the 26th largest craft brewery in the United States.

In 2023, 21st Amendment Brewery expanded its operations to include co-packing services for other beverage brands. The expansion featured the installation of a packaging line, along with a DC Evans tunnel pasteurizer.

On September 4, 2025, 21st Amendment Brewery announced it would be going out of business and shutting down its San Leandro brewery and San Francisco brewpub by November 4, 2025. Freccia and O'Sullivan stated that the business never recovered from COVID-19 with the San Francisco location down by 60% compared to 2019 and a 20% decline in overall company sales every year since 2021. Other factors include drinking in the U.S. being at a 90-year low, stiff competition from beer alternatives like hard seltzers, the San Leandro facility never utilizing full manufacturing capacity even with co-packing for other brands, and numerous distribution problems from the loss of nationwide agreements with Brooklyn Brewery to a dispute with a can supplier that restricted how much it could sell to being forced to use less favorable Anheuser Busch networks after its old local distributor DBI Beverage Inc. was bought out by Reyes Holdings, who dropped 21st Amendment. Furthermore, a planned overhaul of the company was cancelled by a lender who backed out of funding the plans.

== Beers ==
21st Amendment's slogan, "Celebrate the right to be original," was displayed on many of their cans, 6-pack and 4-pack carriers, posters, merchandise and website.

They brew and can several year-round beers including Brew Free! or Die IPA, Blood Orange Brew Free! or Die IPA, Blah Blah Blah Double IPA, El Sully Mexican-style Lager; seasonal beers including Hell or High Watermelon wheat, Tasty IPA, and Fireside Chat winter spiced ale; and limited-offering Insurrection Series beers. Historically, this included beers like Hop Crisis Imperial IPA, Monks Blood Belgian-style dark ale, Marooned on Hog Island oyster stout, and He Said Belgian Tripel/He Said Baltic Porter. They also offer a rotating assortment of beers that are available on tap only.

The 21st Amendment has also brewed a few of their brands at F.X. Matt in Utica, New York as part of their partnership with Brooklyn Brewery.

== Awards ==
Name	Style	Year	Competition	Award
Holiday Spiced Ale	Winter Warmer	2001	Great American Beer Festival	Silver
Shot Tower Stout	Stout	2003	Great American Beer Festival	Silver
Double Trouble Imperial IPA	Imperial India Pale Ale	2007	Great American Beer Festival	Bronze
Diesel Imperial Smoked Porter	Smoked Porter	2009	Great American Beer Festival	Bronze
Hop Crisis!	Imperial India Pale Ale	2010	Great American Beer Festival	Silver
Imperial Jack - Imperial ESB	Other Strong Beer	2010	World Beer Cup	Gold
Amber Waves	Amber Ale	2011	Great American Beer Festival	Gold
Bitter American	Session Beer	2012	Great American Beer Festival	Bronze
HQT	Indigenous Ale	2011	Great American Beer Festival	Gold
HQT	Indigenous Ale	2012	World Beer Cup	Silver
MCA	Stout	2013	Great American Beer Festival	Silver
Toaster Pastry	Double Red	2015	Great American Beer Festival	Silver
MCA Stout	Session Beer	2015	Great American Beer Festival	Silver
Down to Earth	Session IPA	2016	World Beer Cup	Silver
Toaster Pastry	Double Red	2016	World Beer Cup	Bronze
El Sully - Mexican-Style Lager	American Cream Ale	2016	Great American Beer Festival	Gold
El Sully - Mexican-Style Lager	American Cream Ale	2018	Great American Beer Festival	Bronze
Emperor Norton's - Sweet Stout	Sweet Stout or Cream Stout	2019	Great American Beer Festival	Silver
El Sully - Mexican-Style Lager	American Cream Ale	2023	World Beer Cup	Bronze
Amendment Lager - Light Lager	American Cream Ale	2024	World Beer Cup	Gold
El Sully - Mexican-Style Lager	American Cream Ale	2024	Great American Beer Festival	Silver
Amendment Lager - Light Lager	American Cream Ale	2025	World Beer Cup	Silver

== See also ==
- List of California breweries
