= KSA (disambiguation) =

KSA is the Kingdom of Saudi Arabia.

KSA or Ksa may also refer to:

== Arts and media ==
- KSA-TV, Alaska, US
- Kirby Star Allies, a 2018 video game
- Kitten Space Agency, a video game in development by RocketWerkz

== Aviation ==
- Kosrae International Airport (IATA airport code), Federated States of Micronesia
- Sydney Airport, also known as Kingsford-Smith Airport, Australia

== Computing ==
- Key-scheduling algorithm, in cryptography
- Kogge–Stone adder

== Organisations ==
- Kenya Scouts Association
- Kommando Strategische Aufklärung (Strategic Reconnaissance Command), a German intelligence organization
- Korea Scout Association
- Korean Standards Association
- Kosher Supervision of America

== Schools ==
- Korea Science Academy, Busan, South Korea
- Ohio State University Knowlton School of Architecture, housed in Knowlton Hall
- Kettering Science Academy, a school in Kettering, Northamptonshire

== Other uses ==
- Ksa (spirit), a Native American Lakota and Oglala spirit of wisdom
- King's South Africa Medal, a medal for service in the Boer War
- Knowledge, Skills, and Abilities, on US government job applications
- KSA, a kölsch-style ale by Fort Point Beer Company
