= Slice Beer Company =

Microbrewery in California, United States

SLICE BEER CO.
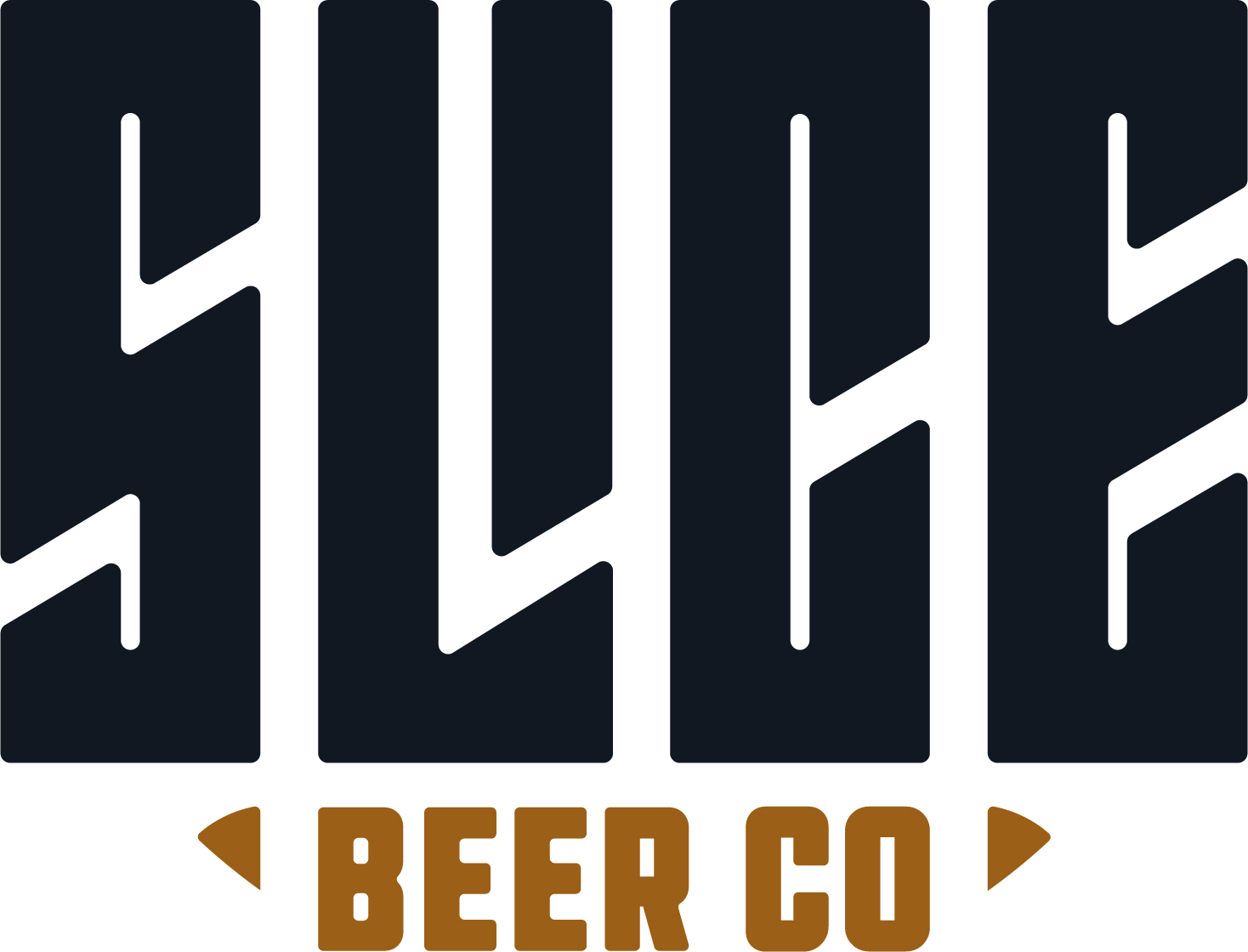
- Location: 665 6th Street, Lincoln, California, United States
- Opened: November, 2019
- Key people: Zack Frasher; Russ Yeager
- Website: Official website

Active beers
Name	Type
Original Juice	Hazy IPA

Slice Beer Company is a microbrewery in Lincoln, California, United States. Slice predominantly features West Coast IPAs, Hazy IPAs, and classic styles.

== History ==
Slice was founded in 2019 by Zach Frasher and Russ Yeager. Yeager is marketing director for Old Town Pizza, located next door to Slice's taproom. Frasher was a former brewer at Moonraker Brewing in nearby Auburn, California, and is credited with raising Moonraker's profile in the U.S. beer community by creating a triple IPA that bested Russian River Brewing's Pliny the Younger in 2017 at the annual Double and Triple IPA competition at The Bistro in Hayward. Frasher, who got his start as a homebrewer while being a stay-at-home-dad after his daughter's birth, worked for Mraz Brewing and Knee Deep Brewing.

== Facility ==
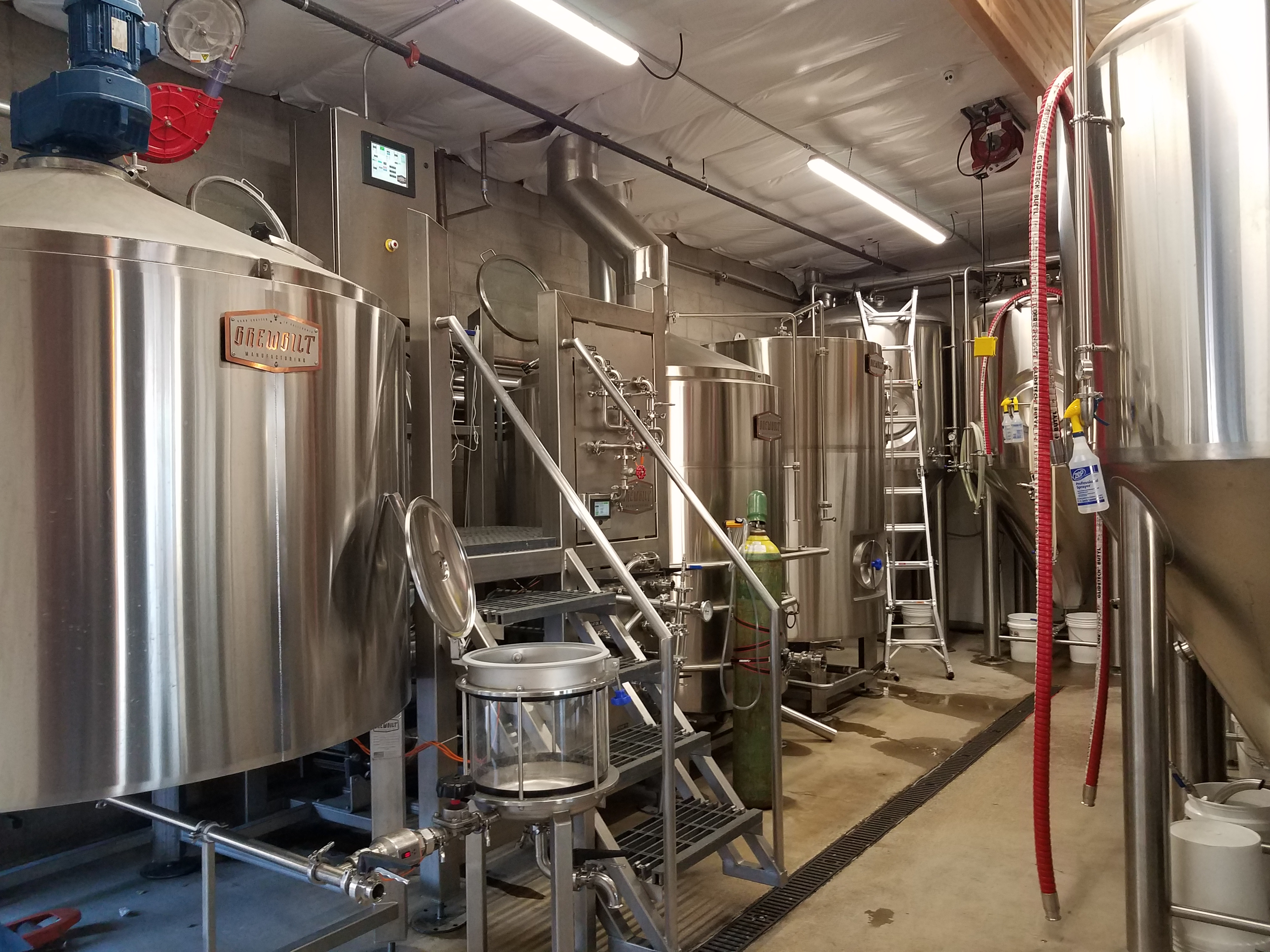
Brewhouse of Slice Beer Company in Lincoln, California, as of February 2020.

Slice has a 10 barrel brewhouse, and a fermentation capacity of 120 barrels. They expect to produce 1,500 barrels a year, which Frasher says gives him the ability to control the entire process. Their brewing facility is located with their taproom, which has a capacity of 32 people.

They do not distribute, instead selling all their beers from their taproom. During 2020's COVID-19 pandemic, they switched to more canned sales.

== Beer ==
Frasher was inspired to create hazy IPAs by New England style pioneers Hill Farmstead, the Alchemist, and Tired Hands. They focus on fresh beers and use the tag line: "Culture of Fresh."

Before production started under their label, Slice brewed collaboration beers with established breweries like Cellarmaker, Moksa, and Urban Roots.

In 2020, they became the first brewery to win people's choice for both the double and triple IPA styles at the Bistro's Double and Triple IPA Festival. The people's choice award is voted on by festival attendees, which numbered around 1,000 in 2020.
