= Calicraft =

Craft brewery in California

- Type: Private
- Industry: Alcoholic beverage
- Founded: 2012
- Headquarters: Walnut Creek, California
- Products: Beer
- Website: www.calicraft.com

Calicraft is an American craft beer brewery located in Walnut Creek, California.

== History ==
The company was founded in 2012 by Blaine Landberg, and opened its first taproom in 2016. Landberg first began brewing beer in college in his dorm room at UC Berkeley.

== See also ==
- List of breweries in California
