= Eugene Hermanutz House =

Historic house in Minnesota, United States

- U.S. National Register of Historic Places
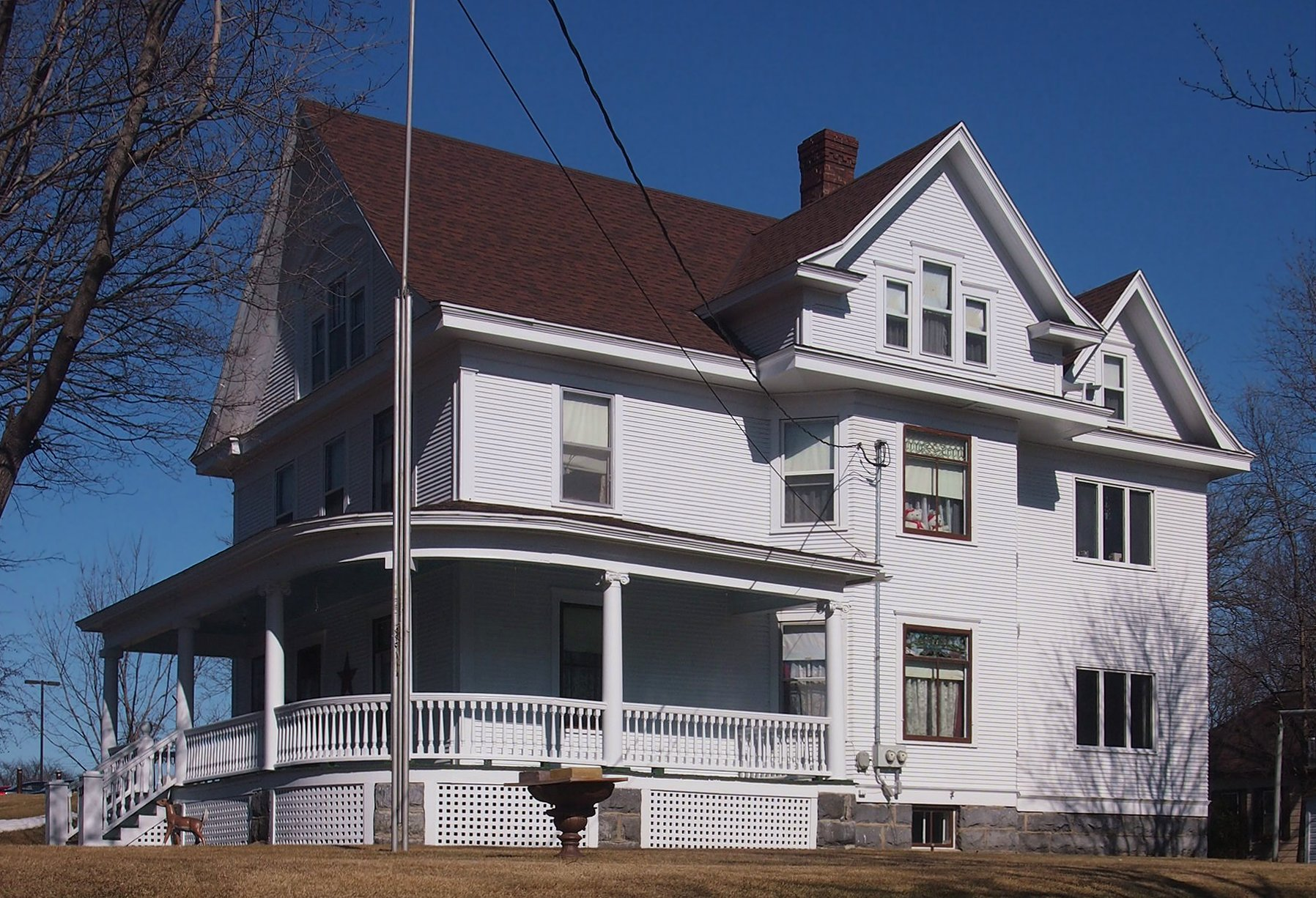
- The Eugene Hermanutz House viewed from the southwest

- Location within Minnesota Location within the United States
- Location: 302 N. Red River Avenue, Cold Spring, Minnesota
- Coordinates: 45°27′33.7″N 94°25′43″W
- Area: Less than one acre
- Built: 1912
- MPS: Cold Spring Brewers' Houses TR
- NRHP reference No.: 82003040
- Added to NRHP: April 15, 1982

The Eugene Hermanutz House is a historic house in Cold Spring, Minnesota, United States. It was built in 1912 for one of three co-owners of the Cold Spring Brewing Company. The Eugene Hermanutz House was listed on the National Register of Historic Places in 1982 for its local significance in the themes of architecture and industry. It was co-nominated with the other two Cold Spring Brewers' Houses, the John Oster and Ferdinand Peters Houses. Their importance derives from representing industrial entrepreneurship, for their status as Cold Spring's finest houses, and for being the most intact surviving buildings associated with Stearns County's important brewing industry.

== See also ==
- National Register of Historic Places listings in Stearns County, Minnesota
