= FiftyFifty Brewing Company =

Craft brewery in California

Coordinates: 39.321891°N 120.163494°W

FiftyFifty Brewing Co.
- Industry: Alcoholic beverage, Restaurant
- Founded: 2007
- Headquarters: Truckee, California, United States
- Products: Beer
- Website: fiftyfiftybrewing.com

FiftyFifty Brewing Co. is a brewpub in Truckee, California. Known for their barrel-aged beers, their production surpassed one thousand barrels of aged beer along with a further volume of fresh beer in 2012.

== Beer ==
Totality Imperial Stout is an imperial stout produced regularly by the company. Yearly, some of this beer is set down in a variety of barrels for six months of aging to make Eclipse Barrel Aged Imperial Stout. Barrels include those previously used for aging brandy, Buffalo Trace Whiskey, and Four Roses Single Barrel among others; there are eleven barrel-types used in all. Bottles are then sold direct from the brewery on futures contract several months before the year's release. Bottles not sold in futures are sent out for distribution or served on premises.

== Awards ==
Name	Style	Honors
Donner Party Porter	Porter	2012 World Beer Cup Bronze
FiftyFifty Imperial Stout	Imperial Stout	2009 Great American Beer Festival Bronze, 2008 Great American Beer Festival Bronze
Totality	Imperial Stout	2011 Great American Beer Festival Bronze

== See also ==
- List of breweries in California
