= Gordon Biersch Brewing Company =

American brewery

- Industry: Alcoholic beverage
- Founded: July 1988
- Products: Beer
- Website: www.gordonbiersch.com

Gordon Biersch Brewery is an American brewery founded by Dan Gordon and Dean Biersch. Gordon, a graduate from the five-year brewing engineering program at Weihenstephan, Germany, and Biersch opened their first brewery restaurant in Palo Alto, California, in July 1988. In 1999, the restaurants were sold to what ultimately became CraftWorks Restaurants & Breweries.

In November 1995, the two founders and their original investors, wanting to expand their then $20 million business, accepted a $11.2 million investment from the Fertitta family of Las Vegas. Lorenzo Fertitta became the controlling owner. As of June 2014, Gordon Biersch brews beer for Costco and Trader Joe's under contract. The Gordon Biersch brewery and bottling plant is located in Japantown in San Jose, California. In 2016, Gordon Biersch released a dry-hopped red ale called "Chum" in honor of the San Jose Sharks.

On May 8, 2019, it was announced that an investor group, assembled by original co-founder Dan Gordon, had regained majority control of Gordon Biersch Brewing Company.

== Awards ==
Gordon Biersch Brewing Company has won several American awards. At the Great American Beer Festival, they won gold in the category of Bohemian-style pilsner in 2004, and in the category of German Style Schwarzbier in 2007, and the Rauchbier brewed at the Gordon Biersch Restaurant in Annapolis, Maryland, won gold in 2014. In 2018, Gordon Biersch at Tysons Corner, by brewer Justin Damadio, won a gold medal in the Bohemian Pilsner category at Great American Beer Festival. At the World Beer Cup 2002, they won gold in the category of sweet stout and bronze in the category of Vienna style lager, and at the World Beer Cup 2006, they won gold in the German style schwarzbier category.

== See also ==
- List of breweries in California
