= Eel River Brewing Company =

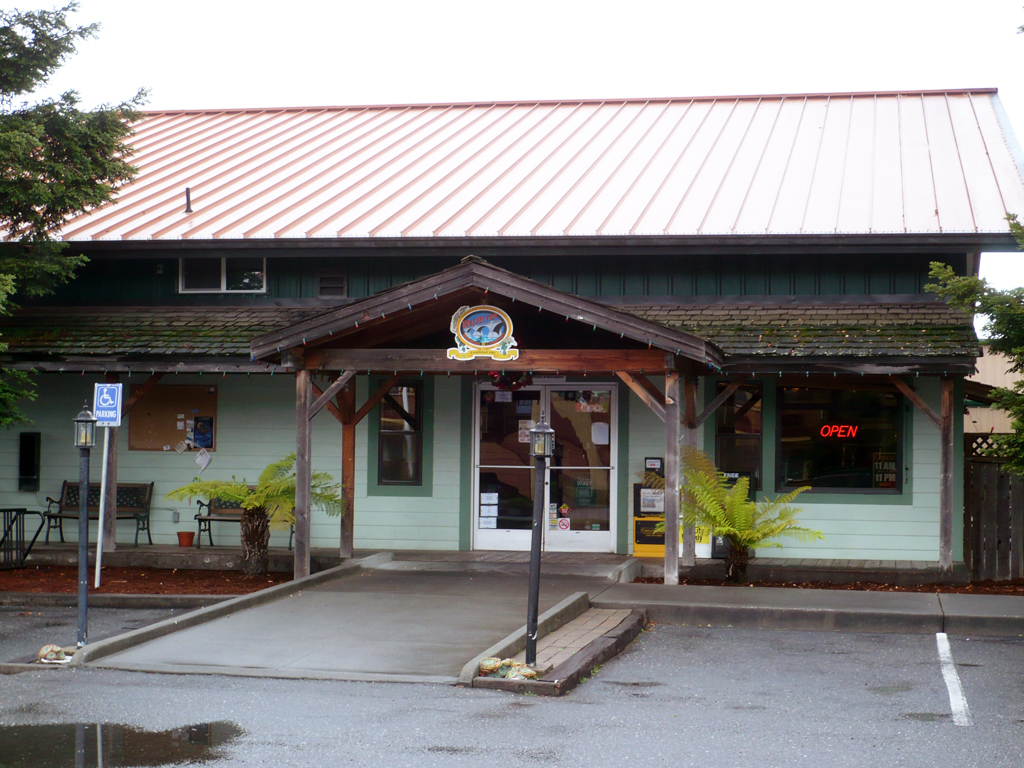
Eel River Brewing Company

Eel River Brewing Company is a brewery in Fortuna, California and the first certified "organic" brewery in all of central Humboldt County.

== History ==
The Eel River Brewing Company was established in 1994 in Fortuna on the site of the Eel River Brewing Taproom and Grill; both are owned and operated by Margaret Frigon and Ted Vivatson. The brewpub was built on the historic site of the Clay Brown Redwood Mill. The focal point of the pub is the 30-foot (9.1 m) long bar made entirely from recovered historic Redwood and Douglas Fir. The establishment, with its 100+ seating, also offers the largest beer garden on California's North Coast complete with a horseshoe pit.

Eel River Brewing made all its beer from 1994 at the brewpub until the move to Scotia in 2007. Since then only small batches of beer are produced at Eel River Brewing Fortuna although it continues to be a top dining destination in the county, with all of Eel River Brewing's beers on tap as well as specialty brews that can be found only there. The menu boasts a wide range of food from stout-smoked BBQ to salads, sandwiches to seafood featuring local and organic Humboldt County products.

In 1999, they became one of the first certified organic brewery in the United States; their Amber Ale was the first beer made with that certification.

In 2007, Eel River Brewing outgrew the original brewing facility and moved to an old redwood mill in Scotia. In 2009 after only two years at the new brewing facility, Eel River Brewing nearly doubled what they were producing previously at the old site. With production in 2009 of over 7,000 barrels, Eel River Brewing currently distributes to more than half of the states in the U.S. as well as Canada, Mexico and Brazil.

== Sustainability ==
They use glass bottles which can be recycled.

== Awards ==
Eel River Brewing has earned almost 2 awards, including bronze and silver medals from the Fortuna Beer Festival, as well as Best of Show at the Humboldt County Fair.

== See also ==
- California breweries
