= Alpine Beer Company =

American brewery

Coordinates: 32°50′6.97″N 116°45′54.12″W

- Interactive map of Alpine Beer Company
- Location: Alpine, California, U.S.
- Opened: 2002
- Key people: Pat Mcilhenney (founder)
- Owned by: Green Flash Brewing Company
- Website: alpinebeerco.com

Active beers
Name	Type
Alpine Ale	Pale Ale
Pure Hoppiness	West Coast Double IPA
Mcilhenney Irish Red	Irish Red
Captain Stout	Chocolate Oatmeal Dry Stout
Mandarin Nectar	Orange Blossom Honey Ale
Willy Vanilly	American Wheat flavored with Vanilla
Willy	American Wheat Ale

Seasonal beers
Name	Type
Duet	West Coast IPA
Nelson	Golden Rye IPA
Exponential Hoppiness	West Coast Triple IPA
O'Brien's IPA	West Coast IPA
Ichabod	Varietal Pumpkin Beer

Other beers
Name	Type
Bad Boy	West Coast IPA
Briscoe	Belgian Lambic
Good	American Barleywine-style Ale
Chez Monieux=	Belgian Kriek
Great	Whiskey barrel-aged Barleywine-style Ale
Achtung	German Lager
Whale	Wet Hop Ale
Achtung	German Lager
Crazy Hazel	American Amber Ale with Hazelnut meal
Emerson	New Zealand Hopped Imperial Pilsner

Alpine Beer Company is an American brewery founded in 1999 by Pat McIlhenney in Alpine, California. Alpine Beer Company produces a variety of beers, many of which have high alcohol content and are strongly hopped beers. The beers have acquired a following due to the popularity of such beers as Pure Hoppiness and Exponential Hoppiness IPAs. Alpine Beer Company was ranked as the fifth best brewery in the US in 2006 by Beer Advocate.

Some Alpine sour beers have been mentioned in the Los Angeles Times as "part of a new wave of refreshing American sour beers".

Alpine has won three Great American Beer Festival medals and eight World Beer Cup medals. In 2003, Alpine won the Bronze in the GABF for its Mandarin Nectar and in 2004 won a silver for McIlhenney’s Irish Red. It was also awarded a gold medal in the 2004 World Beer Cup and a Silver in 2008 for McIlhenney’s Irish Red. In 2016 Alpine was awarded the GABF bronze medal in the Strong Pale Ale category for their HFS IPA.

Prior to founding its own brewery in 2002, Alpine Beer Company had been contracting brewing of its “McIlhenney’s Irish Red”, from AleSmith Brewing Company.

In November 2014, Alpine Beer Company was acquired by fellow San Diego brewery Green Flash Brewing Company.

== Beers ==
- Pure Hoppiness 8% abv
- McIlhenney's Irish Red 6% abv

== Photo gallery ==
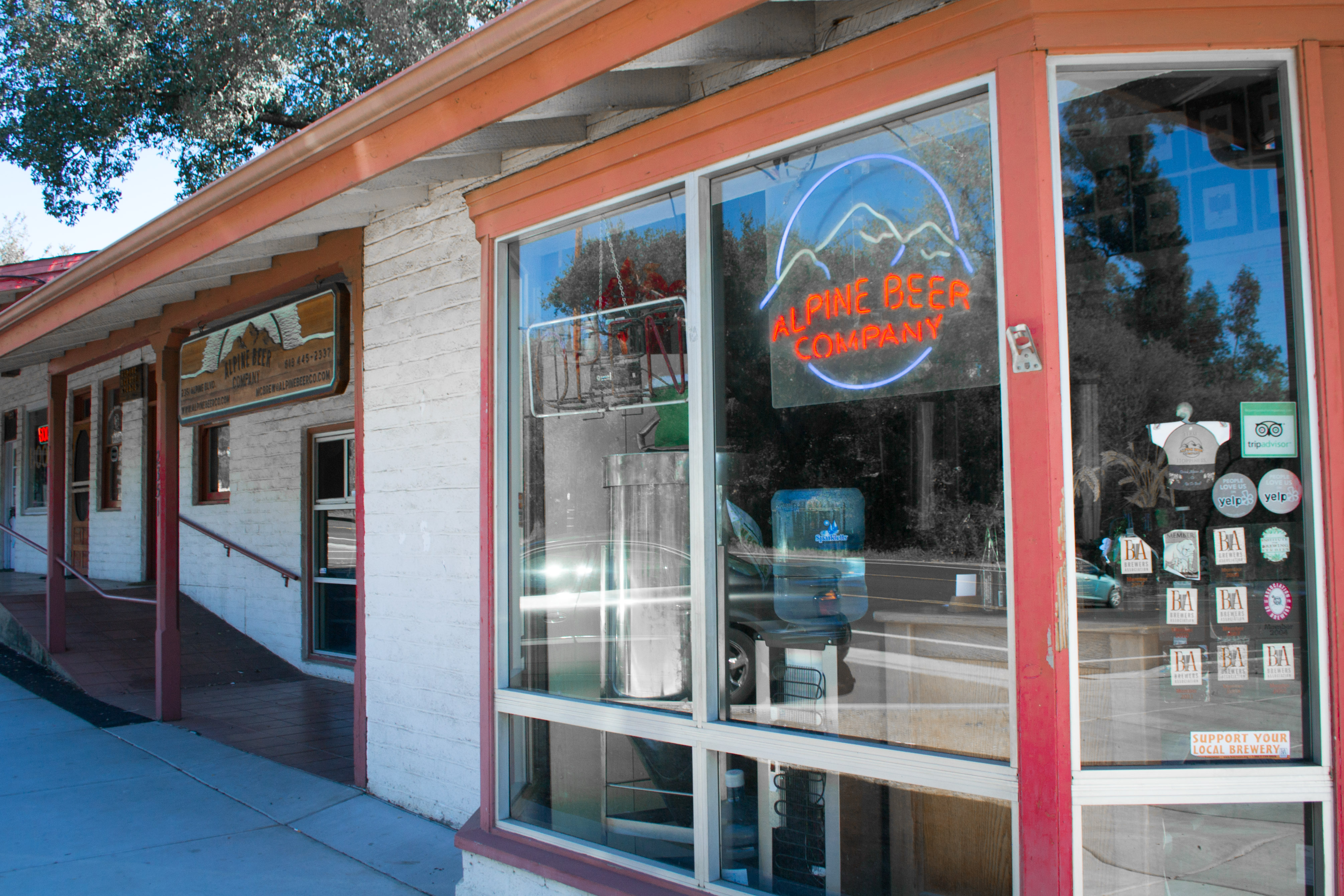
The Alpine Beer Company in Alpine, California

== See also ==
- California breweries
- Barrel-aged beer
