= Green Flash Brewing Company =

Brewery in California, USA

Coordinates: 32.9068°N 117.1774°W

Green Flash Brewing Co.
- logo
- Industry: Alcoholic beverage
- Founded: 2002
- Founder: Mike Hinkley (CEO); Lisa Hinkley
- Headquarters: San Diego, California, U.S.
- Key people: Erik Jensen (brewmaster)
- Products: Beer
- Production output: 82,000 US barrels/year (2015)
- Number of employees: 199
- Parent: Tilray
- Subsidiaries: Alpine Beer Company
- Website: greenflashbrew.com

Green Flash Brewing Company is an American craft brewery headquartered in the Mira Mesa neighborhood of San Diego, California, and founded in 2002. In early April 2018, the company sold to a group of investors, WC IPA LLC following a foreclosure by the company’s principal lender, Comerica Bank.

Starting in 2013 it began expanding, seeking to cover all 50 US states and to export as well. It acquired another company, Alpine Beer Company, in 2014, and opened an East Coast brewery in 2016. However it financed the expansion with loans, and in the face of competition from local craft breweries it was not able to keep up with its payments. The company tried to shrink to control its costs but by April 2018 its lender foreclosed, and the company was sold to a private investor group.

In January 2022 Green Flash was acquired by Tilray.

== History ==
Green Flash was founded in 2002 by Mike and Lisa Hinkley. Chuck Silva was brought on as brewmaster in 2004. During his 11-year tenure, Silva created a number of beers, including the West Coast IPA in 2005 and Le Freak in 2006. He left in September 2015 to open his own brewery Silva Brewing, and Erik Jensen was promoted from head brewer to brewmaster.

In June 2011, Green Flash moved from its original brewery in Vista, California, to its new 44,000 square-foot brewing facility in San Diego's Mira Mesa neighborhood. In March 2013, Green Flash announced that it would open a second brewery in Virginia Beach, Virginia, with a capacity of 100,000 barrels per year, which would make it the third-largest brewery in Virginia. It took out a $20 million loan in order to build it.

In July 2014, Green Flash partnered with Belgium-based St. Feuillien Brewery to brew and sell the West Coast IPA in Europe, making Green Flash the first American craft brewery to brew, bottle and distribute its IPA throughout Europe.

In November 2014, Green Flash acquired Alpine Beer Company, with Alpine co-founders Pat and Val McIlhenney retaining control of their brews. Green Flash had been producing kegs of Alpine's Hoppy Birthday, Nelson and Duet starting in 2013, enabling Alpine to double its output to 3,000 barrels a year. The acquisition allowed Alpine to increase production and expand nationally, beyond California, beginning in late 2015.

By the end of 2014 its beer was sold in Canada, Mexico, Brazil, Japan, Singapore and Europe. In 2015, Green Flash opened Cellar 3, a facility and tasting room featuring barrel-aged and bottle-conditioned beers, located in Poway, California.

By March 2016 it was the 37th largest brewery in the United States by sales volume. The Virginia Beach brewery opened in November 2016, and doubled Green Flash's nationwide supply of beer, and helped move the beer to the East Coast market more efficiently. It produced the same beers and had the same equipment as the company's San Diego brewery.

In January 2018, in the face of competition from other craft breweries, the company withdrew distribution from 32 states and cut 15% of its employees. In February 2018 it was looking for financing to restructure its debt. At the end of March 2018 it closed Cellar 3, put its Virginia Beach brewery up for sale, and stopped distributing in 10 more states. In early April, the company said that its main lender, Comerica Bank, had foreclosed on a defaulted $20 million loan and had sold the company to a group of private investors, which intended to bring in new management.

In June 2018, the brewery opened Green Flash Brewhouse & Eatery in Lincoln, Nebraska, across from the University of Nebraska campus. The brewpub ceased operations in fall 2019.

== Products ==
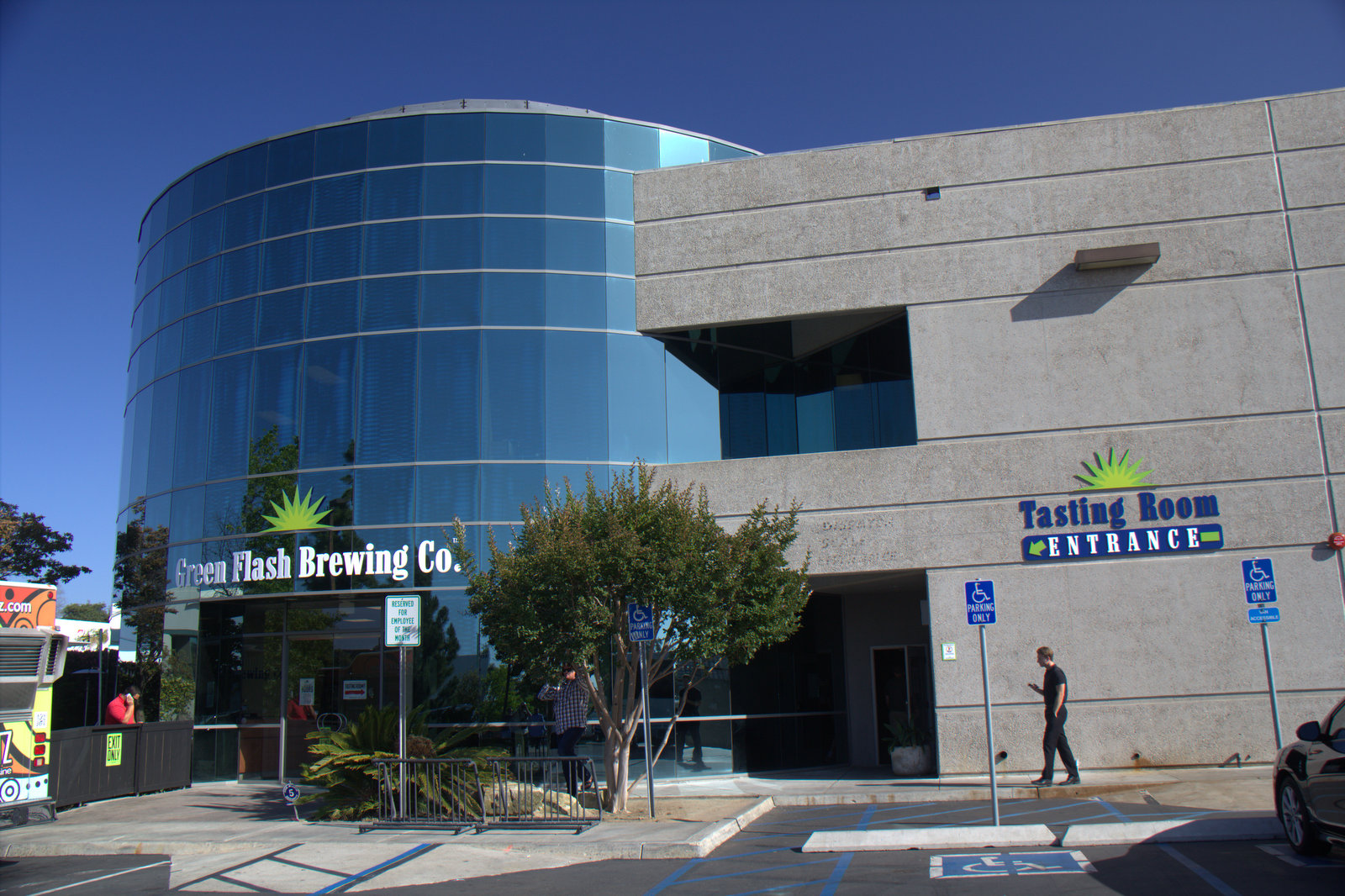
Exterior of Green Flash Brewing Co. in San Diego in 2013

From its inception, Green Flash has specialized in IPAs, building its reputation on aggressively flavored, innovative, highly hopped, high abv and high IBU beers, such as West Coast IPA, Palate Wrecker Hamilton’s Ale, and Le Freak. In January 2016, Green Flash announced the national release of several new beers, including Passion Fruit Kicker (an American wheat ale with passion fruit), Cosmic Ristretto Baltic Porter with Espresso, and Tangerine Soul Style, an IPA with tangerine juice. On May 6, 2016, Green Flash announced the national and year-round launch of three beers sold in cans: Jibe Session IPA, Passion Fruit Kicker and Sea to Sea Zwickel Lager. Green Flash have won a number of product awards, including one of the gold awards for beer style at the 2008 World Beer Cup, and at the 2011 and 2015 Great American Beer Festival.

== Treasure Chest program ==
In 2011, Lisa Hinkely, a breast cancer survivor, launched Green Flash's Treasure Chest program. Each year, the annual charity event includes a new limited-release beer to raise money for local and national breast cancer-related charities. The program begins with an annual festival, Treasure Chest Fest, at the Mira Mesa location. Through 2015, it has raised over $220,000 for various regional breast cancer charities. Green Flash has also been holding Treasure Chest Fests in Virginia Beach since 2014, as construction of the brewery there began. The 2016 event was specifically set to celebrate the new brewery's grand opening.

== See also ==
- California breweries
- Barrel-aged beer
