= Devil's Canyon Brewing Company =

- Industry: Alcoholic beverage
- Founded: 2001
- Headquarters: San Carlos, California, USA
- Products: Beer
- Owner: Chris and Kristiann Garrett (Independent)
- Website: www.devilscanyon.com

Devil's Canyon Brewing Company is an American brewery established in 2001 by Chris Garrett in an unincorporated section of Belmont, California on the San Francisco Peninsula, USA.

== History and awards ==
Established in 2001, by Chris Garrett, the brewery’s name was derived from the original Spanish name for the city of Belmont and from La Canada del Diablo, the name of the canyon that runs through Belmont and San Carlos. (Prior to the 1780s the canyon portion of Belmont and San Carlos was known as “la Canada del Diablo” or Devil’s Canyon.) Devil's Canyon has a core branding of six beers, and produces seasonal specialties in limited runs as well as a very popular root beer. In July 2013 they relocated to the City of San Carlos, California.

In 2014 San Francisco A-List readers voted Devil's Canyon Brewery the Bay Area's "Best Beer Bar".

The company’s practices have earned them the 2014 Sustainable San Mateo County award.

== See also ==
- California breweries
