= John Oster House =

Historic house in Minnesota, United States

- U.S. National Register of Historic Places
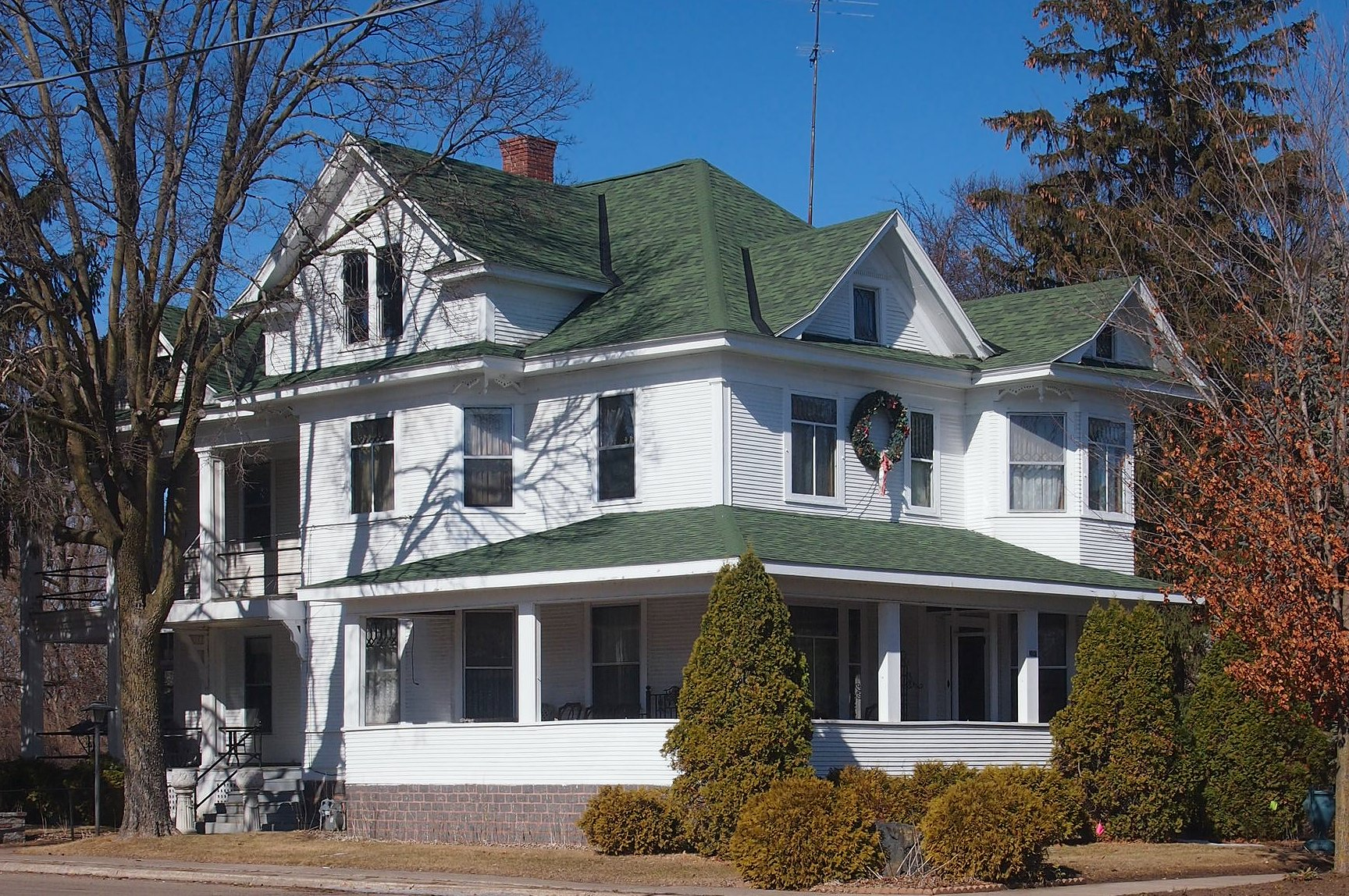
- The John Oster House viewed from the southeast

- Location within Minnesota Location within the United States
- Location: 201 N. Red River Avenue, Cold Spring, Minnesota
- Coordinates: 45°27′39.3″N 94°25′45.7″W
- Area: Less than one acre
- Built: 1907
- MPS: Cold Spring Brewers' Houses TR
- NRHP reference No.: 82003041
- Added to NRHP: April 15, 1982

The John Oster House is a historic house in Cold Spring, Minnesota, United States. It was built in 1907 for one of three co-owners of the Cold Spring Brewing Company. The John Osters House was listed on the National Register of Historic Places in 1982 for its local significance in the themes of architecture and industry. It was co-nominated with the other two Cold Spring Brewers' Houses, the Eugene Hermanutz and Ferdinand Peters Houses. Their importance derives from representing industrial entrepreneurship, for their status as Cold Spring's finest houses, and for being the most intact surviving buildings associated with Stearns County's important brewing industry.

== See also ==
- National Register of Historic Places listings in Stearns County, Minnesota
