= Rick Bell =

American football player (born 1960)

No. 33
- Position: Running back

Personal information
- Born: October 18, 1960 (age 66); St. Cloud, Minnesota
- Listed height: 6 ft 0 in (1.83 m)
- Listed weight: 205 lb (93 kg)

Career information
- High school: Rocori (MN)
- College: Saint John's
- NFL draft: 1983: undrafted

Career history
- Minnesota Vikings (1983)

Career NFL statistics
- Games played: 14
- Kickoff returns: 1
- Kickoff return yards: 14
- Stats at Pro Football Reference

Richard Thomas Bell (born October 18, 1960) is an American former professional football player who was a running back for the Minnesota Vikings of the National Football League (NFL). He played college football for the Saint John's Johnnies.

Born in St. Cloud, Minnesota, Bell attended Rocori High School, about 20 miles (32 km) south-west of the city, and Saint John's University in nearby Collegeville Township. He went undrafted in the NFL and signed for the Vikings during the 1983 season; he played 14 games, but his only statistical contribution was a 14-yard kickoff return in a 13–2 loss to the Detroit Lions in Week 14.
