= Rocori High School =

ROCORI High School

Location
- 534 5th Ave N Cold Spring, Minnesota 56320; United States; 45°27′48″N 94°25′42″W

Information
- Type: Public
- Established: 1969
- School district: ROCORI School District
- Teaching staff: 54.50 (FTE)
- Grades: 9–12
- Enrollment: 824 (2024-2025)
- Student to teacher ratio: 15.12
- Color
- Mascot: Spartan
- Website: www.rocori.k12.mn.us

ROCORI High School is a high school that serves three Minnesota towns, whose names form the acronym "ROCORI": Rockville, Cold Spring, and Richmond. The school is located in Cold Spring, Minnesota, United States about twenty miles southwest of St. Cloud. The school received media attention for a shooting in 2003 that left two students dead. It is also noted for having the first winter drumline/indoor percussion ensemble in history.

== 2003 shooting ==
A school shooting occurred at Rocori High School on September 24, 2003. The shooting was perpetrated by 15-year-old John Jason McLaughlin, who murdered students Seth Bartell and Aaron Rollins.

== Athletics ==
=== Basketball ===
The Spartan boys basketball team has made it to the state tournament 13 times in the school's existence, winning a state championship in 1988, placing second in 1999, and placing third in 1979, 1992 & 2007. Former head coach Bob Brink is the second coach in Minnesota State High School League history to win 900 games in any sport, second only to Bob McDonald of Chisholm. A notable player for the Spartans was Justin Stommes (Eastern Kentucky).

=== Baseball ===
The Spartans baseball team has also made the state tournament 9 times, winning state championships in 1992 and 2010, finishing as runner-ups in 1991, 2013 and 2017, and taking the consolation championship in 2007. A notable baseball player, Eric Decker, was drafted by the Milwaukee Brewers in 2008 and the Minnesota Twins in 2009.

=== Football ===
The Spartan football team won their first state championship in 2011, beating Bemidji 17-10 to take Class AAAA. They won their second championship in 2019 beating SMB 22-21 in overtime. Notable football players for the Spartans include NFL players Rick Bell '79 - MN Vikings (St.Johns) and Eric Decker '05 - Denver Broncos, New York Jets, Tennessee Titans, and New England Patriots (MN Gophers)

=== Dance ===
The ROCORI dance team has also made it to state in 2009, 2010, 2013, 2015, 2016, 2017, 2018, and 2019 after being created in 2008 with their top performances being fourth place in both High Kick and Jazz in 2017.

== Alumni ==
- Rick Bell, former Minnesota Vikings running back
- Eric Decker, former NFL wide receiver for the Tennessee Titans, New England Patriots, New York Jets, and Denver Broncos, former baseball outfielder and football wide receiver for the Minnesota Golden Gophers, and Reality TV star, he had been drafted in the Major League Baseball draft twice.
- Justin Stommes, Played professional basketball in Europe for 5 seasons.
- Ron Backes, Olympic Shot Putter.
