= Justin Stommes =

American basketball player (born 1988)

Personal information
- Born: November 23, 1988 (age 37) Cold Spring, Minnesota, U.S.
- Listed height: 6 ft 8 in (2.03 m)

Career information
- High school: Rocori (Cold Spring, Minnesota)
- College: Eastern Kentucky (2007–2011)
- NBA draft: 2011: undrafted
- Playing career: 2011–present
- Position: Small forward

Career history
- 2011–2012: Webmoebel Baskets
- 2012: Eisbären Bremerhaven
- 2013: Kirchheim Knights
- 2013–2014: Landstede Zwolle
- 2014–2015: Helsinki Seagulls
- 2015-2016: Wolves Verviers-Pepinster

Career highlights
- DBL All-Star (2014); Rookie Of The Year Drew League 2019

Justin Stommes (born November 23, 1988) is an American professional basketball player from Cold Spring, Minnesota. He played college basketball for the Eastern Kentucky Colonels from 2007 until 2011. He has played for 5 professional teams from 2011 to 2016. He returned to the court for the 2019 Drew League season and won Rookie Of The Year honors. He runs his company, Justin Stommes Basketball, throughout the nation and trains aspiring athletes and NBA players.

== High school career ==
Justin starred for Rocori High School as a stand-out guard. Recruitment in his junior and senior seasons resulted in a full scholarship to Eastern Kentucky University. He has been highly recognized at Rocori High School because of his history including; Rocori's only Division 1 Basketball player, most points in a game-school history (40), All-State Honors, All Conference, 3A MN Player of the Year, McDonalds All-American Nominee, 3-time State Tournament Participant, & the only player to average 20+ points in school history.

== College career ==
Stommes played college basketball for the Eastern Kentucky Colonels from 2007 until 2011. His statistics illustrate the important impact he had on the basketball court. In his junior year, Justin started all 33 of the Colonels contests and led the team in scoring (14.2 ppg), assists (3.5 apg) and minutes played (32.4 mpg). He finished among the top 10 in the OVC in scoring with a 52.1 percent field goal percentage and a 41.5 percent assists and three-point shooting.

In addition, Stommes was named OVC Player of the Week on Nov. 23 after hitting the game-winning three-pointer with 9.7 seconds left against UTSA while scoring 17 points and dishing out seven assists. He was named MVP of the O’Reilly Auto Parts CBE tournament. Justin averaged 11.7 points and 3.4 rebounds a game over his four years. He finished third in Colonel History in career three-pointers made (210) sixth in assists (300) and sixteenth in points (1,277) assists. Justin was an incredible asset to his team and school. Stommes's intensity and vision on the floor with his ability to create opportunities for his teammates made him one of the premier guards in the Ohio Valley Conference. With a major in sports management and his impressive success in basketball, Justin had transformed himself from a college player to a professional sports player.

== Professional career ==
Justin had an outstanding rookie season in Europe during his first professional season. He was arguably Germany's Pro-A's top player in 2011-12 and the only player in the league to shoot over 50% from the both 2pt-fgs and 3pt-fgs.

He continued his success with another incredible season in Holland's top division where he was the only player in the league to rank in the top 5 in both scoring 16.2ppg and steals 2.0spg,. He was also the only player to shoot over 50%-2fgs, over 50%-3fgs, and over 80%-fts.

Stommes signed a one-year contract with Landstede Basketbal in the Netherlands for the 2013–14 season. Stommes was named to the DBL's All-Star squad in February. In the Playoffs, Landstede was defeated 1–2 in the Quarter-finals by ZZ Leiden.

For the 2014–15 season he moved to Helsinki Seagulls of the Finnish Korisliiga when signing a one-year contract.

He signed with VOO Wolves Verviers-Pepinster of the Belgian Ethias League on 19 August 2015. Justin averaged 13 ppg while shooting amazing percentages (50%-2fgs, 60%-3fgs and 84%-fts)

In 2019, he was invited to join the Drew League starting as the PG for the Baxter Legacy team. He took his team to the playoffs and won Rookie Of The Year Drew League 2019.

== Honors ==
Individual awards

- 3A Minnesota Player Of The Year: 2007
- OVC Player of the Week: 2010
- MVP of O'Reilly Auto Parts CBE Tournament: 2010
- DBL All-Star: 2014
- Rookie Of The Year Drew League 2019.

== Justin Stommes Basketball ==
Justin Stommes Basketball (JSB) was founded in 2012 by Justin Stommes to give back to the youth and aspiring athletes. The training is a camp designed for NBA, NCAA, and youth players to build, strengthen, and broaden skills of all levels. Players can expect exercises focusing on dribbling, shooting, passing, footwork, and strong defense and experience in-depth one on one training to learn specific techniques for their position. JSB focuses on implementing structured physical and mental training to help players improve by expanding their strengths and conquering weaknesses. Throughout the training, players cover drills such as; stations, ball handling contests, 11 man (fast break), 1 on 1, 3 on 3, 5 on 5, and more. JSB also offers private training and virtual training upon availability.
