= Mad River Brewing Company =

Mad River Brewing Company

Mad River Brewing Company is a brewery established in 1989 and located in Blue Lake, California, known for its green production processes.

== History and awards ==
The brewery was established 1989 by brewmaster Bob Smith. Its Steelhead Extra Pale Ale was listed by the Oakland Tribune as one of ten "quintessential Northern California beers". Other beers produced by Mad River have included Steelhead Stout, Serious Madness Black Ale, Double Dread Imperial Red, and John Barleycorn Barleywine.

== Waste reduction and recycling ==
The company attempts to reuse all of its equipment and materials and has a reported waste reduction rate of 98 percent. Much of the organic waste, ten tons of spent barley malt and yeast a year, are fed to local livestock or used as composting material. For their efforts in waste reduction the company won 7 WRAP awards presented by the California Integrated Waste Management Board.

== See also ==
- California breweries
- Beer in the United States
