= Drake's Brewing Company =

Craft brewery in California

Coordinates: 37.714535°N 122.179176°W

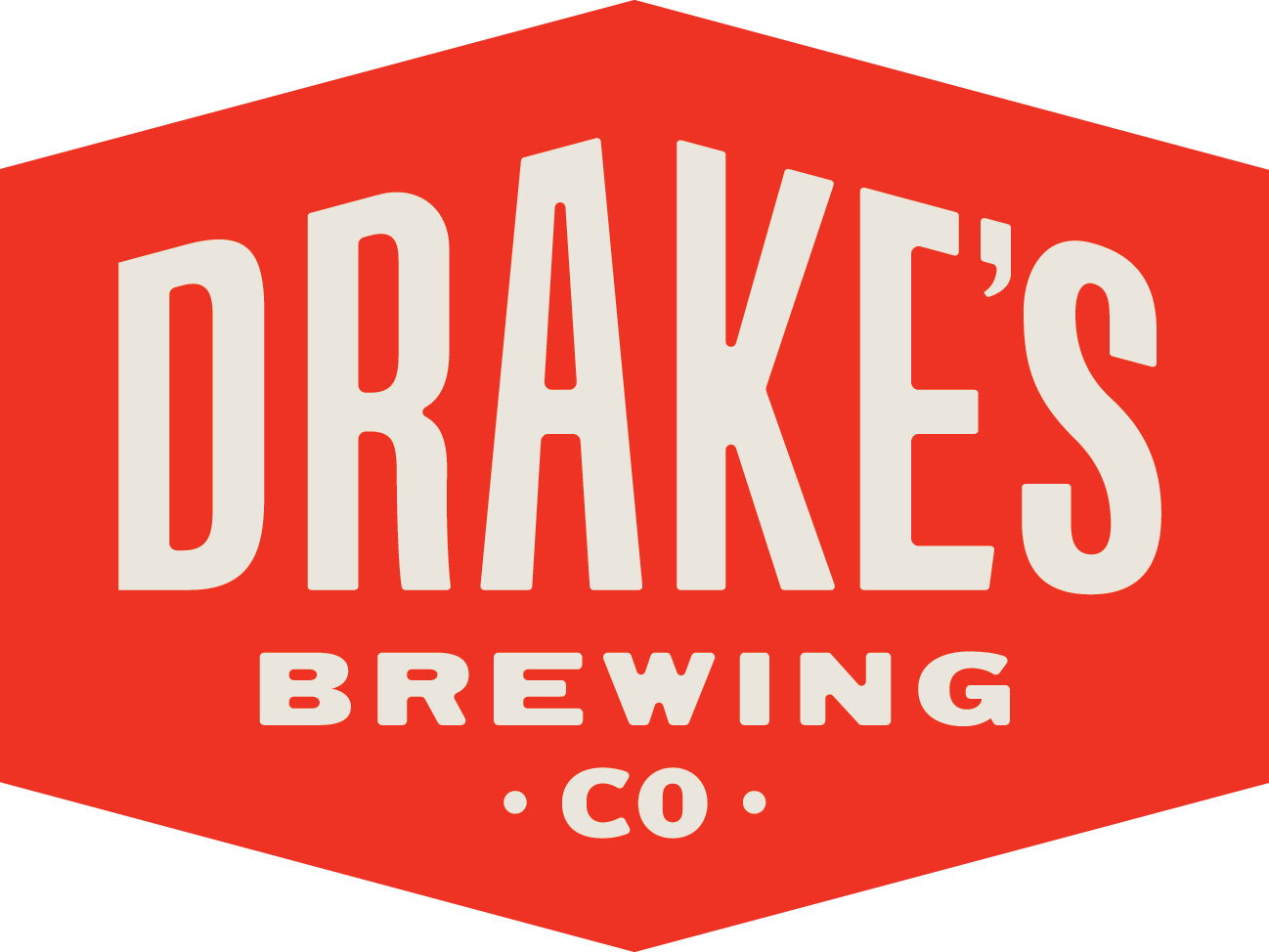
- Type: Private
- Industry: Alcoholic beverage
- Predecessor: Lind Brewing Company
- Founded: 1989
- Founder: Roger Lind; John Martin
- Headquarters: San Leandro, CA, United States
- Products: Beer
- Owner: John Martin; Roy Kirkorian
- Website: www.drinkdrakes.com

Drake's Brewing Company is a craft brewery in San Leandro, California. The company started in 1989 as a wholesale-only kegged beer seller under the name Lind Brewing, after company founder, Roger Lind. Drake's operates out of the old Caterpillar Inc. production facility located behind a Walmart. In 2008, Drake's was sold to the owners of Triple Rock Brewery and Alehouse, a brewpub in Berkeley, California.

In 2015, Drake's opened a new taproom in an old car dealership building in Oakland, called Drake's Dealership. In 2018, Drake's opened a taproom, restaurant and events center in West Sacramento called The Barn.

Drake's operates a taproom called Drake's Barrel House inside its barrel aging warehouse in San Leandro, California. Most of the barrel aged beers are unique to the taproom and are not usually available for growler or keg fills; Drake's first bottling of a barrel aged beer, Reunion Barley Wine Ale, occurred in 2013.

In 2023, Drake's Brewing Company acquired Bear Republic Brewing's formula, recipes, and intellectual property.

== Awards ==
1500 Pale	Pale Ale	2014 California State Fair Bronze, 2010 World Beer Cup Silver, 2008 Great American Beer Festival Silver
Amber	Extra Special Bitter	2004 World Beer Cup Silver
Black Robusto Porter	Robust Porter	2014 California State Fair Silver, 2013 Great American Beer Festival Silver
Denogginizer	Imperial India Pale Ale	2009 Great American Beer Festival Silver
Drake's Gold (Note: brewed as Lind Brewing Company)	Blonde/Golden Ales	1991 Great American Beer Festival Bronze
IPA	India Pale Ale	2004 World Beer Cup Bronze, 2002 Great American Beer Festival Gold
Rye Robustito	Wood and Barrel-Aged Beer	2016 World Beer Cup Silver, 2016 Great American Beer Festival Bronze
Santa's Brass	Barley Wine	2018 Great American Beer Festival Gold
Patches O'Houlihan	Irish-Style Red Ale	2023 World Beer Cup Bronze

== See also ==
- List of breweries in California
