= Cold Spring, Minnesota =

City in Minnesota, United States

Cold Spring
- City
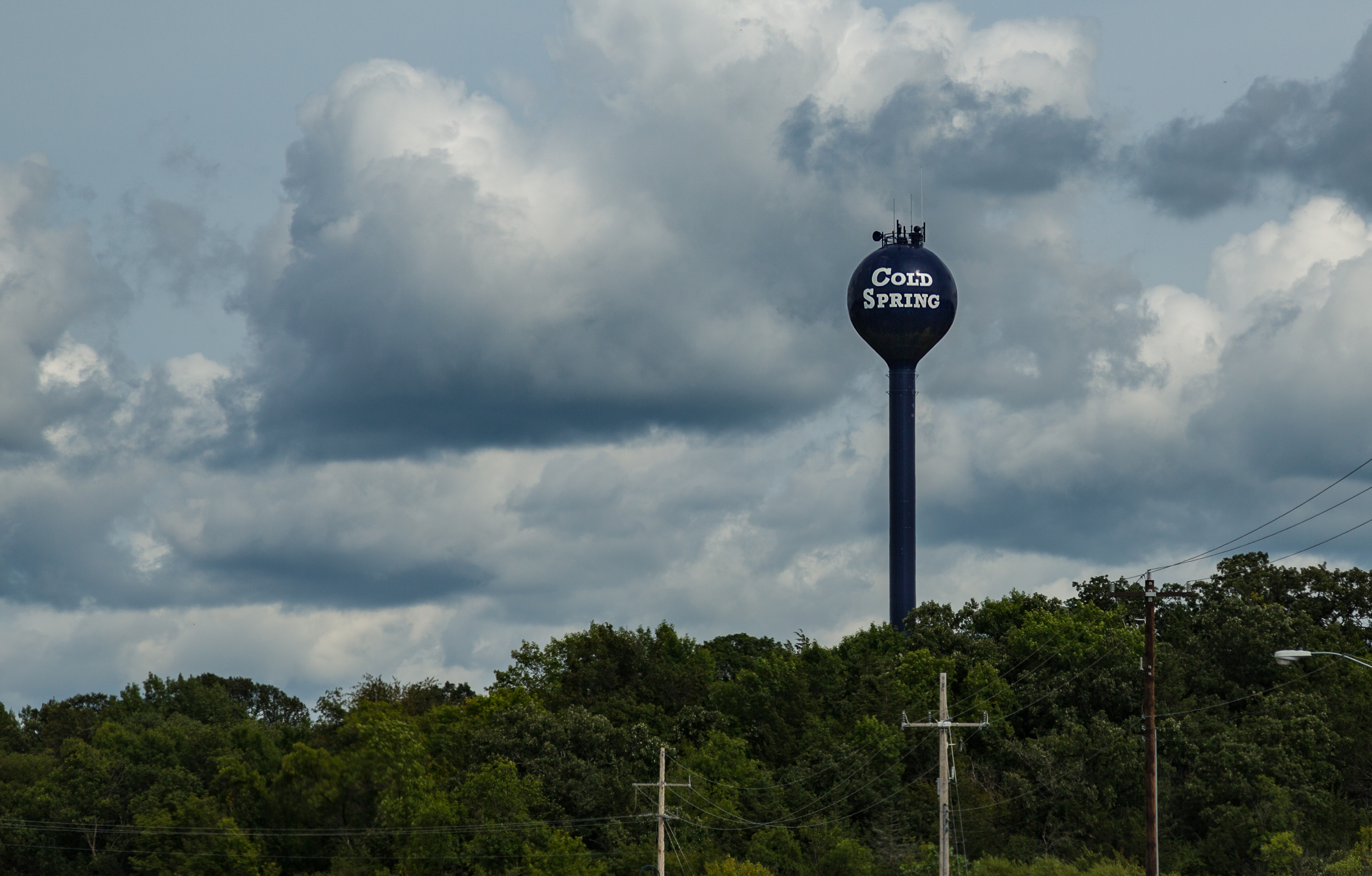
- Water tower located on the north side of Cold Spring

- Location of Cold Spring within Stearns County, Minnesota
- Coordinates: 45°27′29″N 94°25′44″W
- Country: United States
- State: Minnesota
- County: Stearns

Government
  - Mayor: Dave Heinen

Area
  - Total: 2.85 sq mi (7.38 km^{2})
  - Land: 2.80 sq mi (7.26 km^{2})
  - Water: 0.046 sq mi (0.12 km^{2})
- Elevation: 1,102 ft (336 m)

Population (2020)
  - Total: 4,164
  - Density: 1,485/sq mi (573.3/km^{2})
- Time zone: UTC-6 (Central (CST))
  - Summer (DST): UTC-5 (CDT)
- ZIP code: 56320
- Area code: 320
- FIPS code: 27-12484
- GNIS feature ID: 2393590
- Website: https://coldspringmn.gov/

Cold Spring is a city in Stearns County, Minnesota, United States, at the gateway of the Sauk River Chain of Lakes, an interconnected system of 14 bay-like lakes fed and connected by the Sauk River. Cold Spring is part of the St. Cloud metropolitan area. Its population was 4,164 at the 2020 census.

== History ==
Originally home to the Ojibwe, Winnebago, and Dakota people, Cold Spring was platted in 1856, and named for the many springs near the original town site. A post office has been in operation at Cold Spring since 1857.

German-speaking Catholics settled in the area, lured by the Slovenian missionary priest Francis Xavier Pierz, who had submitted letters and advertisements to the major German-language newspapers across the U.S., such as Der Wahrheitsfreund (The Friend of Truth), and in Europe, urging "good, pious" German Catholics to come to the Sauk River Valley, which he called a "land flowing with milk and honey" and safe from disease and anti-Catholic oppression.

During the grasshopper plagues of the 1870s, Assumption Chapel, also known as the Grasshopper Chapel, was built in petition for relief from the locusts.

Cold Spring has three properties on the National Register of Historic Places: the John Oster House and Ferdinand Peters House, both built in 1907, and the Eugene Hermanutz House, built in 1912.

The city was thrust in the national spotlight on September 24, 2003, when then 15-year-old Jason McLaughlin shot and killed two classmates in the Rocori High School shooting.

== Geography ==
According to the United States Census Bureau, the city has an area of 2.70 square miles (6.99 km^{2}); 2.67 square miles (6.92 km^{2}) is land and 0.03 square miles (0.08 km^{2}) is water. The Sauk River bisects Cold Spring from the southwest.

Cold Spring is in Wakefield Township geographically but is a separate entity.

== Demographics ==
Historical population
Census	Pop.	Note	%±
1900	486		—
1910	594		22.2%
1920	705		18.7%
1930	1,147		62.7%
1940	1,427		24.4%
1950	1,488		4.3%
1960	1,760		18.3%
1970	2,006		14.0%
1980	2,294		14.4%
1990	2,459		7.2%
2000	2,975		21.0%
2010	4,025		35.3%
2020	4,164		3.5%
U.S. Decennial Census

=== 2020 census ===
As of the 2020 census, Cold Spring had a population of 4,164. The median age was 40.8 years. 24.9% of residents were under the age of 18 and 22.6% of residents were 65 years of age or older. For every 100 females there were 94.0 males, and for every 100 females age 18 and over there were 91.5 males age 18 and over.

97.3% of residents lived in urban areas, while 2.7% lived in rural areas.

There were 1,710 households in Cold Spring, of which 31.2% had children under the age of 18 living in them. Of all households, 50.0% were married-couple households, 17.1% were households with a male householder and no spouse or partner present, and 27.3% were households with a female householder and no spouse or partner present. About 31.2% of all households were made up of individuals and 18.3% had someone living alone who was 65 years of age or older.

There were 1,799 housing units, of which 4.9% were vacant. The homeowner vacancy rate was 1.3% and the rental vacancy rate was 9.2%.

Racial composition as of the 2020 census
Race	Number	Percent
White	3,780	90.8%
Black or African American	15	0.4%
American Indian and Alaska Native	14	0.3%
Asian	11	0.3%
Native Hawaiian and Other Pacific Islander	0	0.0%
Some other race	174	4.2%
Two or more races	170	4.1%
Hispanic or Latino (of any race)	297	7.1%

=== 2010 census ===
As of the census of 2010, there were 4,025 people, 1,549 households, and 1,049 families living in the city. The population density was 1,507.5 inhabitants per square mile (582.0/km^{2}). There were 1,641 housing units at an average density of 614.6 units per square mile (237.3 units/km^{2}). The racial makeup of the city was 94.2% White, 0.2% African American, 0.2% Native American, 0.2% Asian, 0.1% Pacific Islander, 3.9% from other races, and 1.0% from two or more races. Hispanic or Latino of any race were 7.1% of the population.

There were 1,549 households, of which 36.6% had children under the age of 18 living with them, 53.6% were married couples living together, 10.1% had a female householder with no husband present, 4.0% had a male householder with no wife present, and 32.3% were non-families. 27.8% of all households were made up of individuals, and 16.4% had someone living alone who was 65 years of age or older. The average household size was 2.54 and the average family size was 3.11.

The median age in the city was 36.7 years. 27.7% of residents were under the age of 18; 6.5% were between the ages of 18 and 24; 26.4% were from 25 to 44; 20.4% were from 45 to 64; and 19% were 65 years of age or older. The gender makeup of the city was 48.3% male and 51.7% female.

Ancestry breakdown of residents is German (67.6%), American (5.9%), Swedish (4.0%), Irish (2.4%), Norwegian (1.7%), English (1.2%).

=== 2000 census ===
As of the census of 2000, there were 2,975 people, 1,116 households, and 785 families living in the city. The population density was 1,431.1 inhabitants per square mile (552.6/km^{2}). There were 1,145 housing units at an average density of 550.8 units per square mile (212.7 units/km^{2}). The racial makeup of the city was 98.39% White, 0.20% African American, 0.07% Native American, 0.20% Asian, 0.71% from other races, and 0.44% from two or more races. Hispanic or Latino of any race were 1.34% of the population.

There were 1,116 households, out of which 36.9% had children under the age of 18 living with them, 58.1% were married couples living together, 8.6% had a female householder with no husband present, and 29.6% were non-families. 26.3% of all households were made up of individuals, and 16.6% had someone living alone who was 65 years of age or older. The average household size was 2.56 and the average family size was 3.11.

In the city, the population was spread out, with 27.8% under the age of 18, 7.2% from 18 to 24, 26.6% from 25 to 44, 17.4% from 45 to 64, and 21.0% who were 65 years of age or older. The median age was 37 years. For every 100 females, there were 89.7 males. For every 100 females age 18 and over, there were 84.2 males.

The median income for a household in the city was $37,500, and the median income for a family was $50,268. Males had a median income of $32,225 versus $23,500 for females. The per capita income for the city was $18,308. About 1.9% of families and 3.3% of the population were below the poverty line, including 3.8% of those under age 18 and 6.9% of those age 65 or over.

== Economy ==
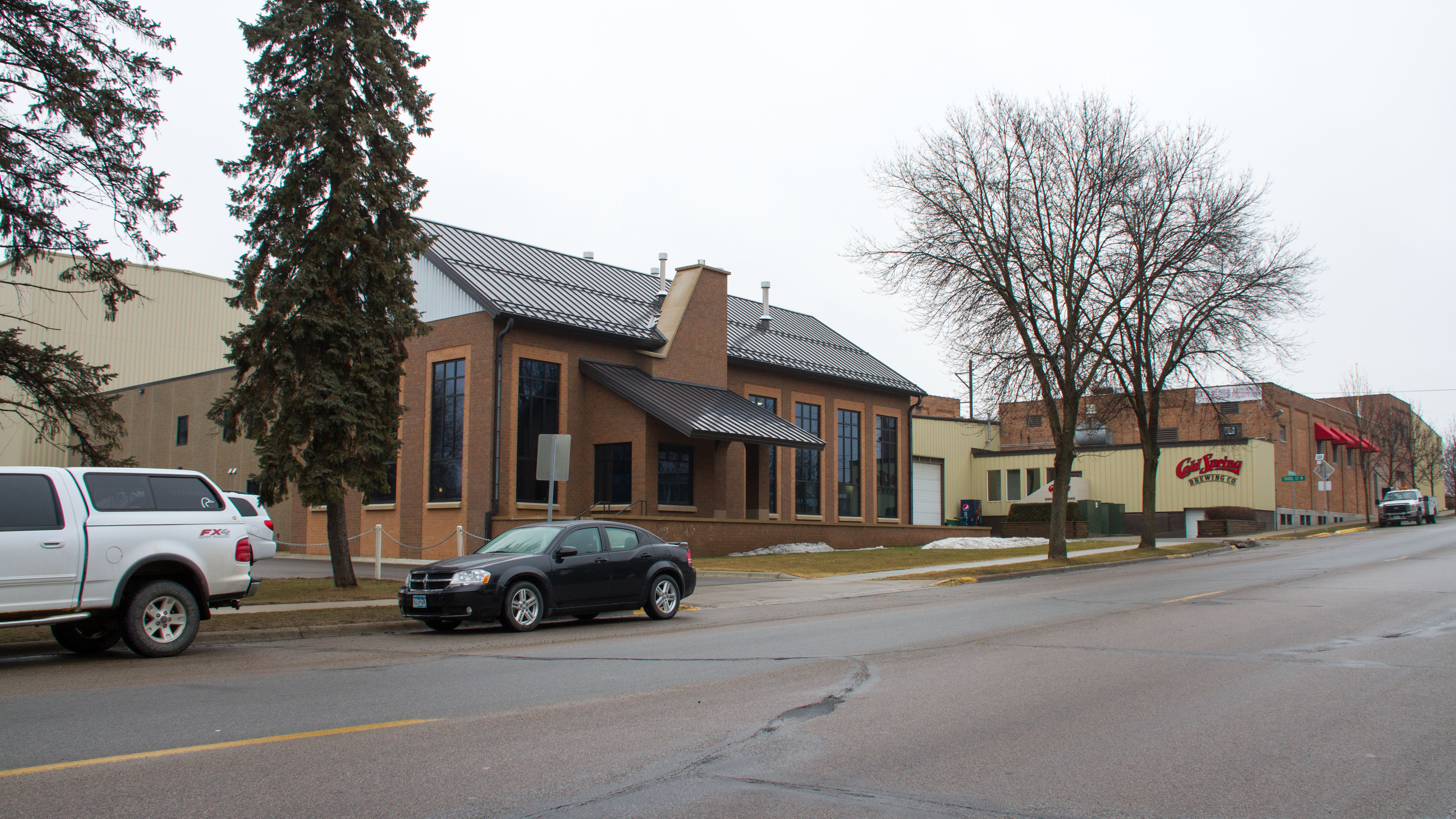
The Cold Spring Brewery was first built in 1874 and remains a major employer in the town.

Top employers in Cold Spring include:

- Coldspring
- Pilgrim's Pride
- Cold Spring Brewing Company. Founded in 1874 by German immigrant Michael Sargl, CSBC produces, packages, and distributes soft drinks, beer, malt beverages, energy drinks, and other beverages. In 2012, the Third Street Brewhouse was started and became CSBC's craft beer division. Brynwood Partners, a Connecticut-based private equity firm, bought the company from the Lenore family in August 2017. At the time, the company had roughly 350 employees and annual sales of more than $60 million.
- Rocori School District
- Assumption Community
- Cold Spring Bakery. Started in 1946 by Melvin and Floss Schurman, and originally known as the Home Bakery, the bakery is on Main Street. It distributes its goods across Central Minnesota and is still owned and managed by the Schurman family.

== Transportation ==
Minnesota Highway 23 serves as a main route in Cold Spring and Interstate 94, the major highway of the region, is nearby, linking Minneapolis, St. Paul, Fargo, Chicago, and Milwaukee. Cold Spring is also served by County Roads 2 and 50, providing north–south access in and out of the city.

Cold Spring's proximity to St. Cloud allows for convenient access to St. Cloud Regional Airport, as well as the city's Amtrak and Greyhound stations.

== Education ==
=== Primary and secondary schools ===
Cold Spring is served by ROCORI Independent School District 750. ROCORI stands for the three adjacent communities that primarily comprise the schools: Rockville, Cold Spring, and Richmond. Local public schools serving Cold Spring include John Clark Elementary, Cold Spring Elementary and Richmond Elementary, ROCORI Middle School, and Rocori High School. There are also three private schools in the district: St. Peter & Paul Elementary (preK-5) in Richmond, St. Boniface Elementary (preK-6) in Cold Spring, and Holy Cross School (preK-6) in Pearl Lake.

=== Public libraries ===
Great River Regional Library (GRRL) has a Cold Spring branch on Red River Avenue.

== Media ==
- Cold Spring Record began publishing weekly in October 1899 and is still in publication.
- Tri-City Cable]: Channel 10 is the local public access television station for the communities of Richmond, Cold Spring and Rockville, broadcasting news on community events and coverage of local government meetings.

== Notable people ==
- Eric Decker, National Football League player
- Alvin Ganzer (1911–2009), film director, born in Cold Spring
- John J. Kinzer (1891–1986), Minnesota state legislator and farmer
- Doug Stang, Minnesota state legislator
- Justin Stommes, professional basketball player; graduated from Rocori High School
