= Fort Point Beer Company =

American Beer Company

- Industry: Alcoholic beverage
- Founded: 2014
- Headquarters: San Francisco, California
- Products: Beer
- Production output: 20,000 barrels
- Owner: Tyler Catalana, Justin Catalana
- Website: http://www.fortpointbeer.com/

Fort Point Beer Company is a beer company located in the Presidio of San Francisco, California, in the United States.

== History ==
Two brothers, Tyler Catalana and Justin Catalana, started Fort Point in 2014. The pair owned a small restaurant and brewery, Mill Valley Beerworks, in Mill Valley, California; Mill Valley Beerworks employee Mike Schnebeck joined the Catalanas as head brewer at the new beer-only venture. Their brewery is located in the Presidio of San Francisco's Crissy Field, overlooking Fort Point. They are a member of the San Francisco Brewers Guild.

They began canning their beers in 2015, selling them in local San Francisco retailers. Uniquely, they are serving as their own distributors.

In 2016, Fort Point opened a kiosk at the Ferry Building in San Francisco. The kiosk includes six tap handles, with beer delivered daily from the brewery, and available in pints or to-go in growlers.

== Production ==
Fort Point's beer lineup focuses on everyday session beers designed to compete with popular macrobrewers such as Stella Artois or Budweiser rather than other local microbrewers. They brew four core beers: KSA (a kölsch-style ale), Villager (a San Francisco style IPA), Westfalia (a Nuremberg-inspired red ale), and Park (a single hop pale ale series), as well as a host of seasonal and special releases. They brewed a special beer designed to be paired with food, Tosca, exclusively for local restaurant Tosca Cafe.

In 2015, they won a Good Food Award for Manzanita, a smoked altbier with manzanita wood.

In 2014, their production was 2,000 barrels; by 2015, they produced 6,000 barrels of beer. The brewery currently produces over 20,000 barrels a year and plans to produce 30,000 in 2018.

== See also ==
- California breweries
