= Belching Beaver =

Craft beer brewery in California, US

Belching Beaver Brewery
- Company type: Private
- Industry: Alcoholic beverage
- Founded: 2012
- Headquarters: San Diego, California
- Number of locations: 5 (2018)
- Key people: Thomas Vogel (founder); Dave Mobley Co-founder; Troy Smith (brewmaster)
- Products: Peanut Butter Milk Stout; Deftones Phantom Bride IPA; Digital Bath IPA; Mexican Chocolate Peanut Butter Stout; Me So Honey Blonde
- Services: Beer
- Website: belchingbeaver.com

Belching Beaver Brewery is an American craft beer brewery based in San Diego, California. The company was founded in 2012 by Thomas Vogel, Dave Mobley, and brewmaster Troy Smith, who formerly served as the brewer at Coronado Brewing Company. The brewery began with a milk stout, which they then evolved into other iterations, including their Peanut Butter Milk Stout, which Smith says "put [them] on the map".

In July 2018, the brewery's Tavern & Grill location was awarded a Wine Spectator Award of Excellence, the first brewpub to win the wine industry award. In 2018, the brewery was listed in the "top 100 list" of craft breweries, by sales, in the United States.
