= Bear Republic Brewing Company =

Craft brewery in California

- Industry: Alcoholic beverage
- Founders: Richard R. Norgrove; Sandy Norgrove; Richard G. Norgrove; Tami Norgrove
- Headquarters: Cloverdale, California, United States
- Number of locations: 1 Pub & Restaurant
- Key people: Richard R. Norgrove (CEO); Richard G. Norgrove (Brew Master)
- Products: Beer
- Production output: 72,000 US beer barrels (8,400,000 L; 2,200,000 US gal; 1,900,000 imp gal) (2013)
- Owner: Drake's Brewing Company Purchased 2/15/2023
- Website: www.bearrepublic.com

The Bear Republic Brewing Company is an American microbrewery located in Cloverdale, California. The company was established by the Norgrove family in 1995, with Richard G. Norgrove as brewmaster. The name refers to California's 1846 Bear Flag Revolt. In 2006, Bear Republic was named Small Brewing Company and Small Brewing Company Brewer of the Year at the Great American Beer Festival.

Bear's best-selling product is Racer 5, an India Pale Ale which accounted for about three-quarters of the company's 2009 sales. Their other brews include Thru the Haze, Further thru the Haze DIPA, Bear Necessities, and Bear Republic IPA. They also have several rotating beer series, including the Challenge Series, Brewmaster Series, Hop Shovel DIPA Series, and Imperial Stout Series, featuring both Old Baba Yaga and Spawn of Yaga.

The company’s original location was a brewpub in Healdsburg, California. In 2005 Bear Republic broke ground at their Factory 5 Production Facility in Cloverdale, CA and in 2017 opened up their Lakeside Brewpub in Rohnert Park, CA. Bear Republic closed its 24-year-old Healdsburg brewpub on November 22, 2019.

In February 2023, Drake's Brewing Company acquired the recipes, formulas, and intellectual property of Bear Republic, with plans to merge operations within the next year.
