= Triple Rock Brewery and Alehouse =

Coordinates: 37.873422°N 122.268702°W

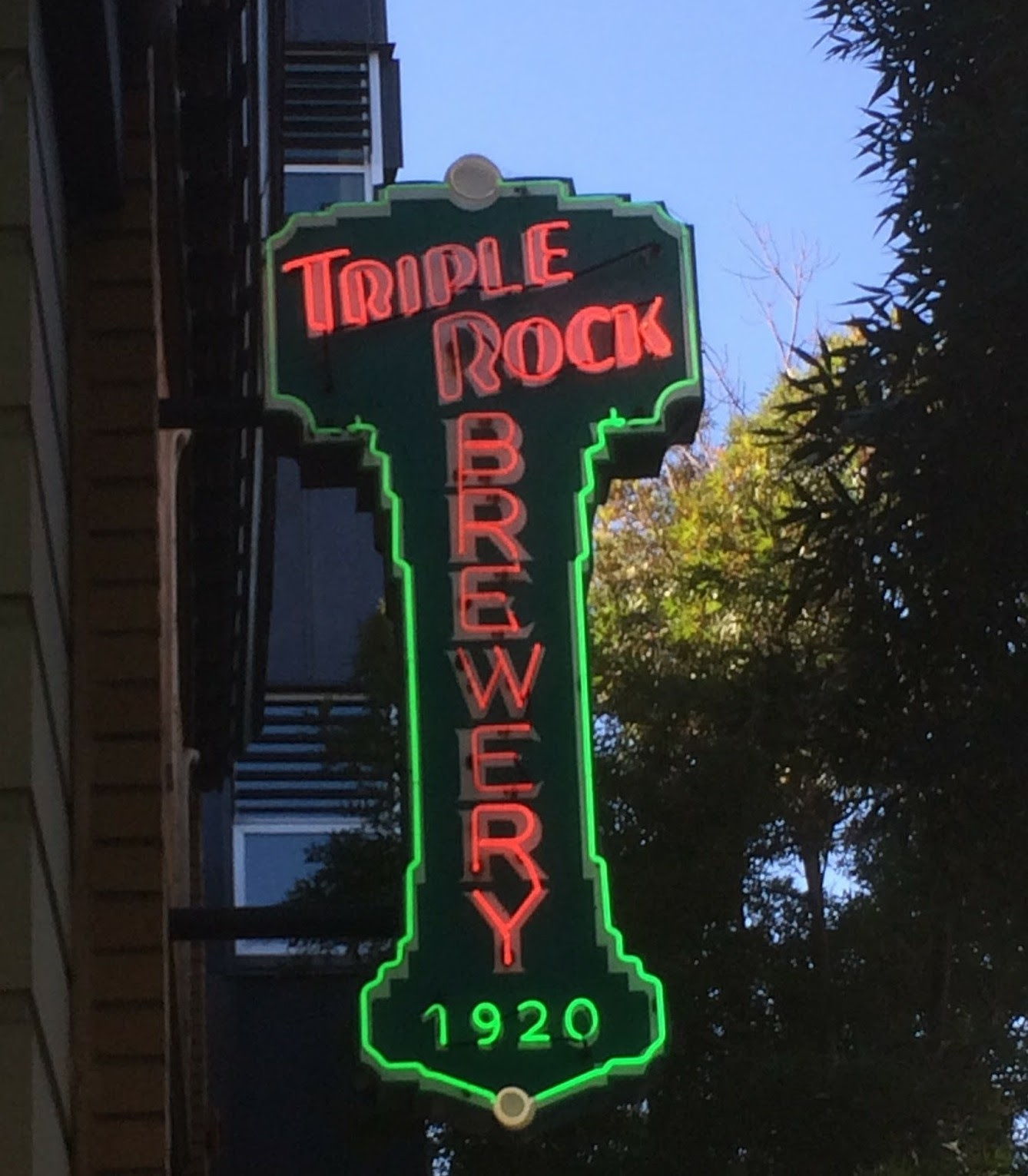
- Type: Private
- Industry: Alcoholic beverage, Restaurant
- Founded: 1985
- Founder: John Martin, Reid Martin
- Headquarters: Berkeley, CA, United States
- Number of locations: 1
- Products: Beer
- Owner: John Martin, Reid Martin
- Website: triplerock.com

Triple Rock is a brewpub in Berkeley, California.

== History ==
The company brewed their first batch of beer on Christmas day 1985, and opened to the public the following year. They claim to be the fifth brewpub opened in the United States, and the oldest currently in operation with the original equipment and brewmasters. The brewery was founded as Roaring Rock Brewery and Alehouse, but changed their name in 1989 at the insistence of Latrobe Brewing Company, owners of Rolling Rock brand beer.

In 2008, the owners of Triple Rock purchased Drake's Brewing Company, in San Leandro, California.

== Awards ==
Name	Style	Honors
7-Fity	Strong pale ale	2010 Great American Beer Festival Bronze
Collaborative Evil	Baltic porter	2010 Great American Beer Festival Silver
Puddy Porter	Baltic porter	2011 Great American Beer Festival Bronze
Red Rock	Amber/Red ale	2013 Great American Beer Festival Bronze, 2010 Great American Beer Festival Bronze, 2010 World Beer Cup Silver, 2009 Great American Beer Festival Silver
Rye Smile	Rye beer	2013 Great American Beer Festival Silver

== See also ==
- List of breweries in California
