= Kosher Supervision of America =

KSA Kosher
- Founded: 1993
- Headquarters: 1801 S. La Cienega Blvd. Los Angeles, CA 90035
- Key People: Rabbi Binyomin Lisbon (CFO); Rabbi Yechezkel Auerbach (Chairman of Vaad Hakashrus); Rabbi Yossi Bodenstein (Rabbinic Coordinator); Rabbi Shlomo Lalezarian (Rabbinic Coordinator)
- Website: ksakosher.org

Kosher Supervision of America is a not-for-profit Kashrut organization based in Los Angeles, California, United States. KSA Kosher was established in 1993 and was which was certified to operate as of January 31, 1996. Its primary purpose is to certify food as kosher. The Kashrus Administrator is Rabbi Binyomin Lisbon. It is a member of the AKO (Association of Kashrus Organizations). KSA also has a significant presence in China.
