= Sudwerk =

Craft brewery in California

Sudwerk is a brewery in Davis, California. It has been crafting German-style lagers since 1989. It was a pioneer of lager in microbrewing, following the strict requirements of the German Reinheitsgebot, and it continues to specialize in craft lagers.

== Beer ==
The beers made by Sudwerk include California Dry Hop Lager, which was created by replacing the German hops with Pacific Northwestern hops in the recipe of the Helles Lager; Northern Pilsner; Märzen Amber Lager; Hefeweizen Bavarian Wheat; Cascaderade India Pale Lager; and 3 Best Friends. Seasonal beers include Mai Bock Spring Lager in spring, Fest Harvest Lager in fall, and Doppel Bock Ulimator in winter. The Helles Lager, Northern Pilsner, Marzen Amber Lager, and Hefeweizen are brewed using the same family recipes originally brought to California by Sudwerk's first German Brewmeister.

== History ==
Ron Broward and Dean Unger founded Sudwerk in 1989 as Sudwerk Privatbrauerei Hubsch. It was the first brewpub in Davis, and the only one there until the 2015 opening of another brewpub, the Three Mile Brewing Company. By 1993, when it went through a major expansion, Sudwerk had become the largest microbrewery in the US. Jay Prahl was hired as brewmaster in 2003, and Broward and Unger sold off the associated restaurant in 2006. After the two founders died in 2011 and 2013, the brewery was sold to Unger's grandson, Trent Yackzan, and his friend Ryan Fry, who quickly promoted long-time employee Mike Hutson to brewmaster. In 2015, they began distributing their beer to states outside California, beginning in Missouri. The restaurant which operated independently from the brewery closed at the end of June, 2016.

As of 2018, Sudwerk has won a total of 13 medals at the Great American Beer Festival including three gold medals. In 2021, Sudwerk won the "Brewery of the Year" award at the Great American Beer Festival

The brewery maintains close ties to the University of California, Davis, where Prahl and Hutson were educated, and its facilities include classrooms used by extension classes at UC Davis.
