= St. Stan's Brewery =

Craft brewery in California

- Industry: Alcoholic beverage
- Predecessor: St. Stans Brewery 1984
- Founded: as corporation 2016
- Founders: Rich Hodder
- Headquarters: Modesto, California, U.S.
- Area served: U.S.
- Key people: Rich Hodder (president)
- Products: Beer
- Website: www.ststans.com

St. Stan's Brewery is a microbrewery in Modesto, California. The company was established in 1984.

In 2017, St. Stan's reopened in downtown Modesto, with a taproom as well as offsite brewing of craft beers by their original brewmaster of 25 years, Bill Coffey, brewing originals such as Red Sky Ale, Whistlestop Pale Ale, Amber and Barley Wine, in addition to plans for some new styles.

== History ==
The brewery originally produced traditional German beer styles. St. Stan's was the first brewery in the United States to brew an Altbier style beer. The brewery was a leader in the microbrewery movement in the 1980s.

It was lead plaintiff in a 1997 class-action suit against Anheuser-Busch, which it accused of engaging in anti-competitive practices by coercing or bullying distributors to get them to stop distributing product for smaller breweries. A Justice Department investigation was ended but the class-action lawsuit was unaffected.

In 2008, Susan Little-Nell, a former owner of St. Stan's, was one of a number of craft breweries lobbying against an attempt by Anheuser-Busch to get California state law changed to allow it to give out free souvenirs up to $5 value rather than just $.25. She described the tough situation of small brewers in the face of "free-for-all promotional spending of international corporations." The Nell's operations of St. Stans, both the brewery and the brewpub, closed on an unknown date, sometime in early 2015.
