= Russian River Brewing Company =

Brewery and brewpub in California

- Industry: Alcoholic beverage
- Founded: 1997
- Headquarters: 700 Mitchell Ln; Windsor, CA, 95492; United States
- Products: Beer
- Production output: 40,000 barrels
- Owner: Vinnie Cilurzo, Natalie Cilurzo
- Website: Official website

Russian River Brewing Company is a brewery and brewpub in downtown Santa Rosa, California, with a second location in Windsor. The company is known for strong India pale ales and sour beers.

== History ==
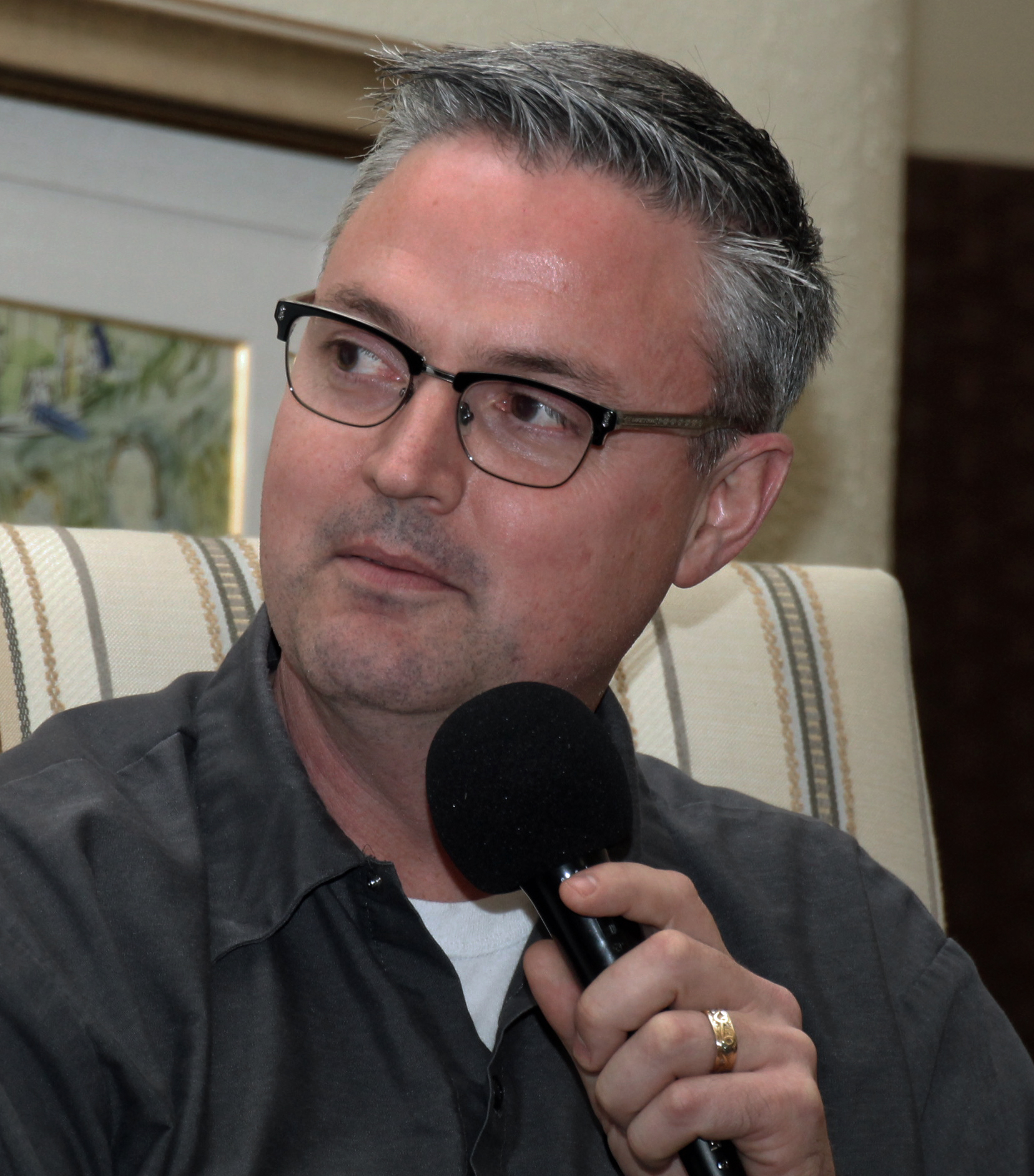
Vinnie Cilurzo

Russian River Brewing Company was created in 1997 when Korbel Champagne Cellars of Guerneville, California decided to try their hand at brewing beer. Brewer Vinnie Cilurzo was hired as brewmaster. Brettanomyces, Cilurzo's favorite component of lambic beers, were first used with local wine barrels in 1999 for production of sour beers. Korbel quit the brewing business, and sold the brewery to Cilurzo and his wife Natalie in 2002. Russian River, remodeled and expanded in 2004, eventually moving to Santa Rosa, at their current 4th Street location. Cilurzo is regarded as one of the most innovative microbrewers in the country and credited with inventing the beer style Double India Pale Ale, known alternately as Imperial IPA, when he was the head brewer at Blind Pig Brewing Company in Temecula, California.

Plans to open a second location in Windsor, just north of Santa Rosa, began before the 2017 Sonoma County fires. In 2016, the Cilurzos partnered with Comerica to finance the project, and the Windsor Planning Commission approved the new brewery, pub, and restaurant the following year. By September 2018, the new brewery was completed and operational. The Windsor facility opened its doors to customers that October. The Windsor facility is differentiated from the Santa Rosa location by its larger size, free parking, expanded menu, and guided brewery tour. The Cilurzos hoped that the two locations would give tourists and local customers the opportunity "to come and spread out and enjoy the experience on their own terms," especially during the annual Pliny the Younger release, which sometimes resulted in lines around the block. Windsor officials hoped that the new location would be a financial boon and make the city more attractive for similar businesses, and the city's "Windsor Hopper" shuttle service, linking local hotels, wineries, and breweries, was unveiled coinciding with the 2019 Pliny release.

== Production ==
In addition to the 20 barrel brewpub (capable of about 3000 barrels per year), Russian River also has a 50 barrel production brewery, originally from Dogfish Head Brewery. In late 2014, the production facility is being updated with a four vessel, 50 barrel brewhouse made by AAA Metal Fabrication in Beaverton, Ore. Russian River has distributors in California, Colorado, Oregon, and Pennsylvania. The company also distributes to 500 restaurants, bars, and other stores. A coolship is used to cool the wort for some of the beers. Barrels of beer are stored in their barrel warehouse and begin tasting after 9 months, though can be aged up to two years before blending.

== Beers ==
=== American style ===
- Aud Blonde - Blonde Ale
- Beer Esteam - California Common Steam Beer
- Blind Pig IPA - India Pale Ale
- Dead Leaf Green - English-Style Pale Ale
- DDH Pliny the Elder - Double Dry Hopped India Pale Ale (formerly Pliny for President)
- Gaffers - English-Style Pale Ale
- Great Beer/Great Wine - Winemaker Session Ale
- Happy Hops - India Pale Ale
- Hop2It - Single Hop Ale (Rotating)
- Hopfather IPA - India Pale Ale
- HUGElarge Pils - Pilsner
- O.V.L. Stout - Dry Irish Stout (100% nitrogen)
- Pliny the Elder - Double India Pale Ale
- Pliny the Younger - Triple India Pale Ale
- Pliny for President - Double Dry-Hopped India Pale Ale
- Row 2 Hill 56 - American Pale Ale (Single Hop: Simcoe)
- Russian River IPA - India Pale Ale
- Russian River Porter - Porter
- Segal Select - Pale Ale (Hops from Segal Ranch)
- Shadow of a Doubt - Imperial Porter

=== Belgian style ===
- Benediction - Abbey-style Double
- Damnation - Golden Ale
- Damnation Batch 23 - Belgian gold aged with oak chips
- Defenestration - Hoppy Blonde Ale
- Deification - Pale Ale
- Erudition - Saison
- Little White Lie - Witbier
- Mortification - Quadrupel
- Perdition - Bier de Sonoma
- Publication - Saison
- Redemption - Blonde Ale
- Rejection - Black Ale
- Salvation - Strong Dark Ale

==== Barrel aged ====
(All of Russian River's barrel-aged beers contain brettanomyces, many contain lactobacillus and pediococcus)

- Beatification - Spontaneously fermented beer
- Compunction - Aged with pluots
- Consecration - Strong dark ale aged in Cabernet Sauvignon barrels with black currants
- Framboise For A Cure - Blonde ale aged in chardonnay barrels with raspberries
- Propitiation - Porter
- Sanctification - Blonde aged in stainless steel tanks with 100% Brettanomyces
- Supplication - Brown Ale aged in pinot noir barrels
- Temptation - Blonde Ale aged in chardonnay barrels
- Toronado 20th Anniversary - A blend of 6 aged beers
- Toronado 25th Anniversary - A blend of 6 aged beers

==== Collaboration ====
- Brux (with Sierra Nevada)
- Collaboration Not Litigation (with Avery, a result of a conflict between the two breweries, both of which made a beer called Salvation)

== Awards ==
Russian River Brewing Company and Vinnie Cilurzo have won numerous awards for their beer.

- 1999 Great American Beer Festival - "Small Brewing Company of the Year"
- 1999 Great American Beer Festival - "Small Brewing Company Brewmaster of the Year"
- 2004 World Beer Cup - "Large Brewpub Champion Brewery"
- 2004 World Beer Cup - "Large Brewpub Champion Brewmaster"
- 2005 Malt Advocate - "Brewery of the Year"
- 2006 World Beer Cup - "Large Brewpub Champion Brewery"
- 2006 World Beer Cup - "Large Brewpub Champion Brewmaster"
- 2008 Russell Schehrer Award - Awarded to Vinnie Cilurzo for "Innovation in Craft Brewing"

== Individual beer awards ==
Name	Style	Honors		
Name	Style	Year	Event	Award
Aud Blonde	Blonde Ale	2010	World Beer Cup	Bronze
Aud Blonde	Blonde Ale	2006	Great American Beer Festival	Bronze
Blind Pig	India Pale Ale	2009	Great American Beer Festival	Bronze
Blind Pig	India Pale Ale	2008	Great American Beer Festival	Silver
Blind Pig	India Pale Ale	2007	Great American Beer Festival	Silver
Blind Pig	India Pale Ale	2006	World Beer Cup	Gold
Blind Pig	India Pale Ale	1996	World Beer Cup	Silver (Note: brewed as Blind Pig Brewing Company)
Blind Pig	India Pale Ale	1996	Great American Beer Festival	Silver
Damnation	Belgian-style Ale	2004	Great American Beer Festival	Silver
Damnation	Belgian-style Ale	2001	Great American Beer Festival	Silver
Damnation	Belgian-style Ale	1999	Great American Beer Festival	Gold
English Extra Special Bitter	Extra Special Bitter	1996	Great American Beer Festival	Gold
Golden Wheat	Wheat Ale	2001	Great American Beer Festival	Gold
Golden Wheat	Wheat Ale	1999	Great American Beer Festival	Silver
HopTime Harvest	Fresh Hopped ale	2012	Great American Beer Festival	Silver
Old Blue Granite	Barley Wine	1996	Great American Beer Festival	Bronze
O.V.L. Stout	Dry Stout	2004	World Beer Cup	Gold
Perdition	Farmhouse Ale	2004	World Beer Cup	Silver
Pliny The Elder	Imperial India Pale Ale	2006	World Beer Cup	Gold
Pliny The Elder	Imperial India Pale Ale	2006	Great American Beer Festival	Gold
Pliny The Elder	Imperial India Pale Ale	2005	Great American Beer Festival	Gold
Pliny The Elder	Imperial India Pale Ale	2004	Great American Beer Festival	Bronze
Redemption	Blonde Ale	2008	Great American Beer Festival	Gold
Russian River ESB	Extra Special Bitter	1999	Great American Beer Festival	Gold
Russian River IPA	India Pale Ale	2000	World Beer Cup	Gold
Russian River Porter	Robust Porter	2010	World Beer Cup	Bronze
Russian River Porter	Robust Porter	1998	Great American Beer Festival	Bronze
Russian River Porter	Robust Porter	1997	Great American Beer Festival	Silver
Salvation	Strong Dark Ale	2008	World Beer Cup	Gold
Salvation	Strong Dark Ale	2002	World Beer Cup	Silver
Sanctification	Brett Blonde	2013	Great American Beer Festival	Silver
Supplication	Sour Brown Ale	2012	World Beer Cup	Bronze
Supplication	Sour Brown Ale	2009	Great American Beer Festival	Bronze
Supplication	Sour Brown Ale	2007	Great American Beer Festival	Silver
Supplication	Sour Brown Ale	2005	Great American Beer Festival	Silver
Temptation	Sour Blonde Ale	2010	Great American Beer Festival	Silver
Temptation	Sour Blonde Ale	2008	World Beer Cup	Silver
Temptation	Sour Blonde Ale	2007	Great American Beer Festival	Silver
Temptation	Sour Blonde Ale	2006	World Beer Cup	Gold
Temptation	Sour Blonde Ale	2004	Great American Beer Festival	Silver
Temptation	Sour Blonde Ale	2003	Great American Beer Festival	Silver
Temptation	Sour Blonde Ale	2002	Great American Beer Festival	Gold

== See also ==
- California breweries
