= Pliny the Younger (beer) =

American beer brand

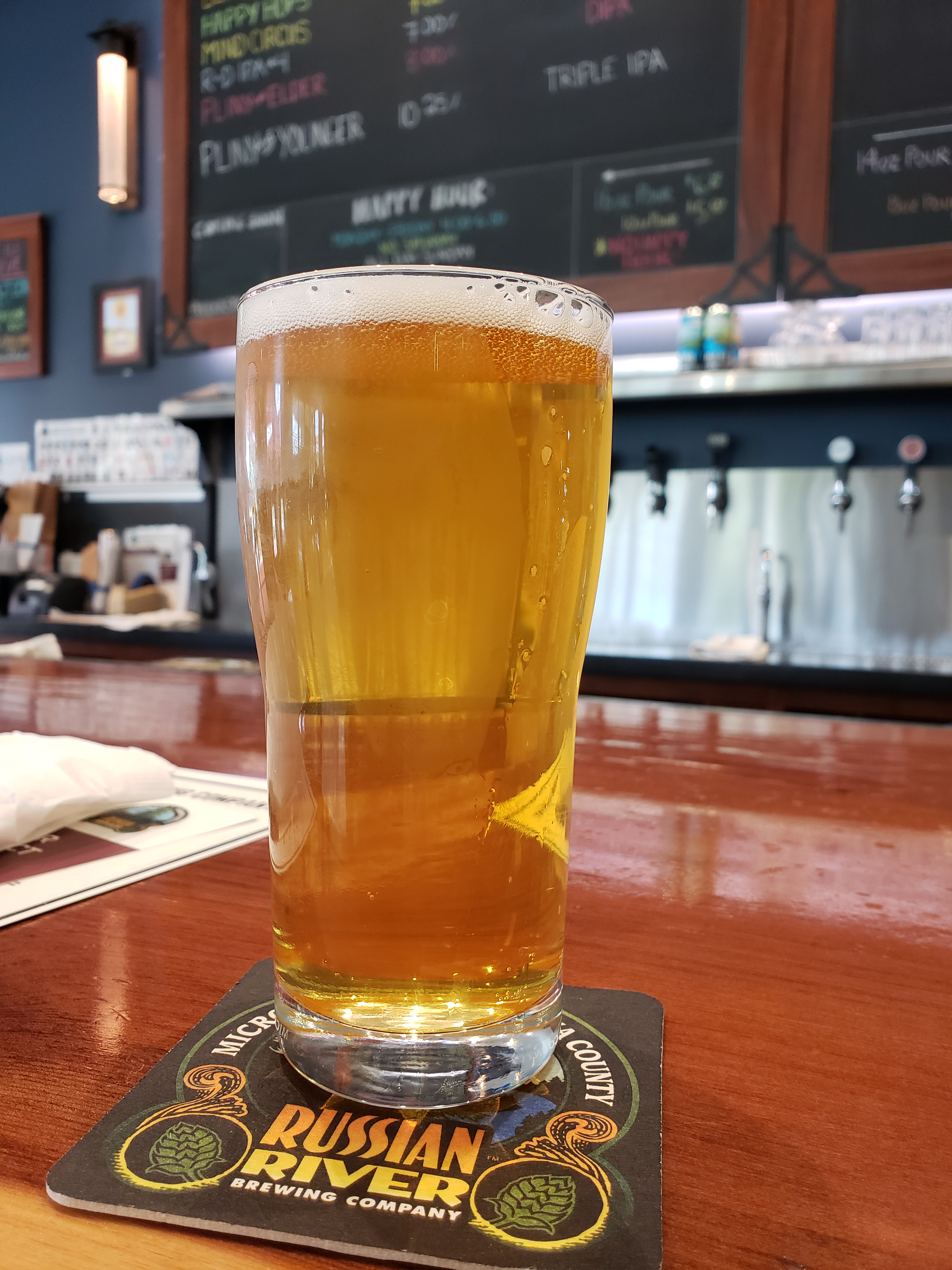
Pliny the Younger beer

Pliny the Younger is a triple IPA brewed by Russian River Brewing Company. It is released annually in February in a two-week event that draws international attendees and generates millions of dollars for the local community.

== History ==
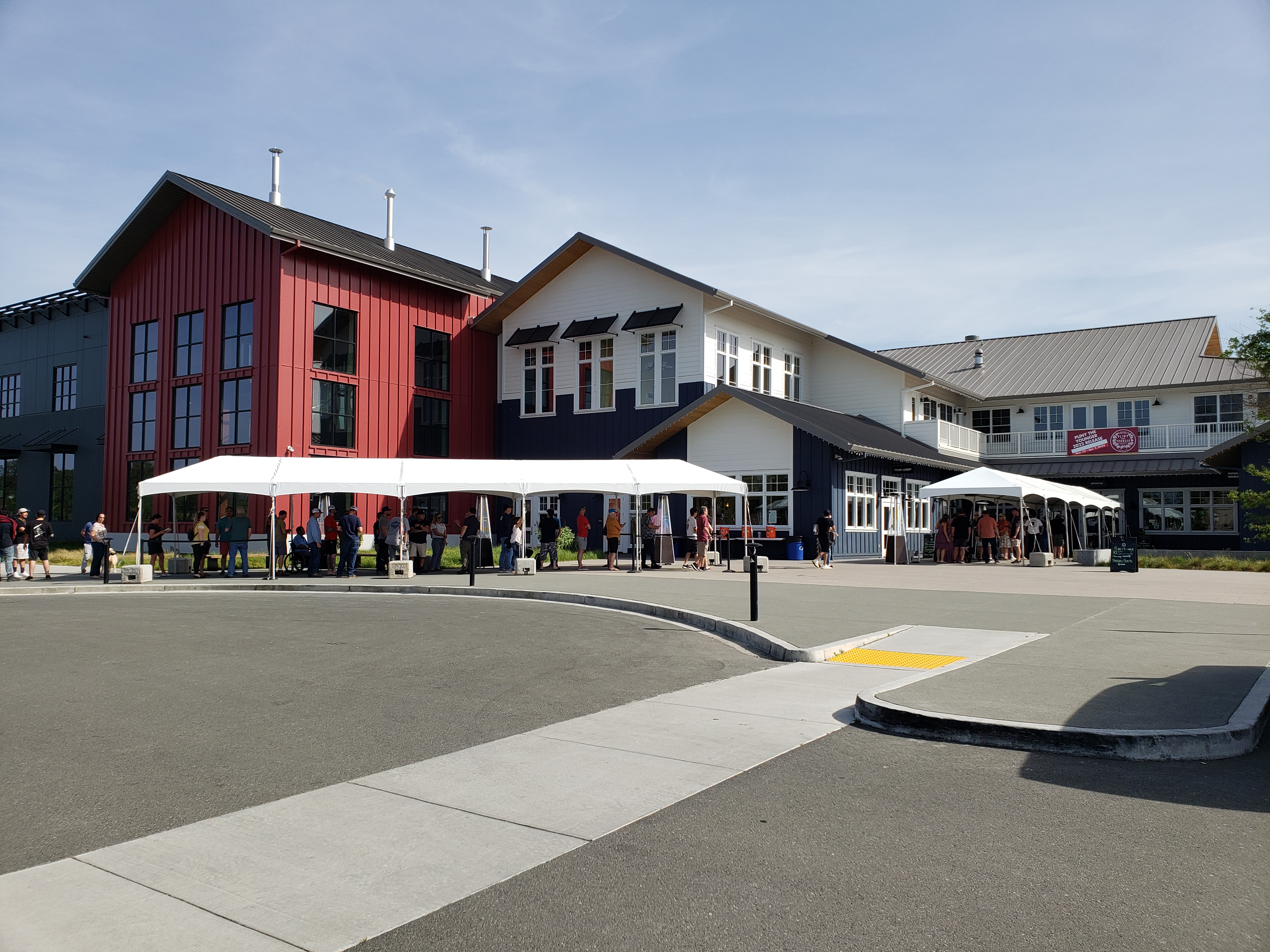
Patrons line up at the Russian River Windsor location to purchase Pliny the Younger in 2022.

Russian River Brewing Company debuted Pliny the Younger in 2005 as a winter beer complement to their double IPA, Pliny the Elder. It is named after Pliny the Younger. At the time it was brewed, it was the first triple IPA.

In 2010, it landed on the number 2 spot on beer rating websites Beer Advocate and RateBeer; the result was all 620 gallons brewer Vinnie Cilurzo had made were gone in eight hours. Since then, Russian River Brewing Company has created a controlled release over a two-week period beginning the first Friday in February. Until 2020, it was only available on tap, in 10-ounce glasses, with a limit of three per person at the pub. As it became popular, people began camping outside the pub and waiting hours in line to get a pour. A handful of bar and restaurant accounts also receive kegs, and tap them typically in conjunction with San Francisco Beer Week activities.

In 2020, Russian River sold 510 ml bottles of Younger for the first time at their pub locations. In 2021, the COVID-19 pandemic forced the release online; it sold out in 5 minutes. Russian River co-owner Natalie Cilurzo says they had previously avoided bottling it for fears of a black market online, but found in 2020 that there were a few sales but not as many as she'd feared. In 2022, the pandemic delayed the release at the brewery until March 25, but it was available in both bottles and on tap at both pub locations.

== Beer ==
Pliny the Younger is an expanded version of Russian River's double IPA Pliny the Elder, with more hops, malt, and higher alcohol; typically, Younger's ABV is around 10.25%. It is dry hopped.

== Economic impact ==
The Sonoma County Economic Development Board studies the impact of the February release of Pliny the Younger every year.

In 2018, the study determined the Younger release brought an economic impact of $3.36 million to Sonoma County from visitors who traveled to the county specifically for the release. According to the report, people came from 17 countries and 40 states.

In 2019, the study found the Younger release brought $4.16 million in economic impact, helped by the addition of a second location: the original bar in Santa Rosa and the new larger brewing facility in Windsor. Visitors came from 14 countries and 42 states, according to the report.

In 2020, the number rose to $5.1 million. More than 23,000 visitors came from 14 countries and 47 states.
