= Culture of San Diego =

The culture of San Diego is influenced heavily by American and Mexican cultures due to its position as a border town, its large Hispanic population, and its history as part of Spanish America and Mexico. San Diego's longtime association with the U.S. military also contributes to its culture. Present-day culture includes many historical and tourist attractions, a thriving musical and theatrical scene, numerous notable special events, a varied cuisine, and a reputation as one of America's premier centers of craft brewing.

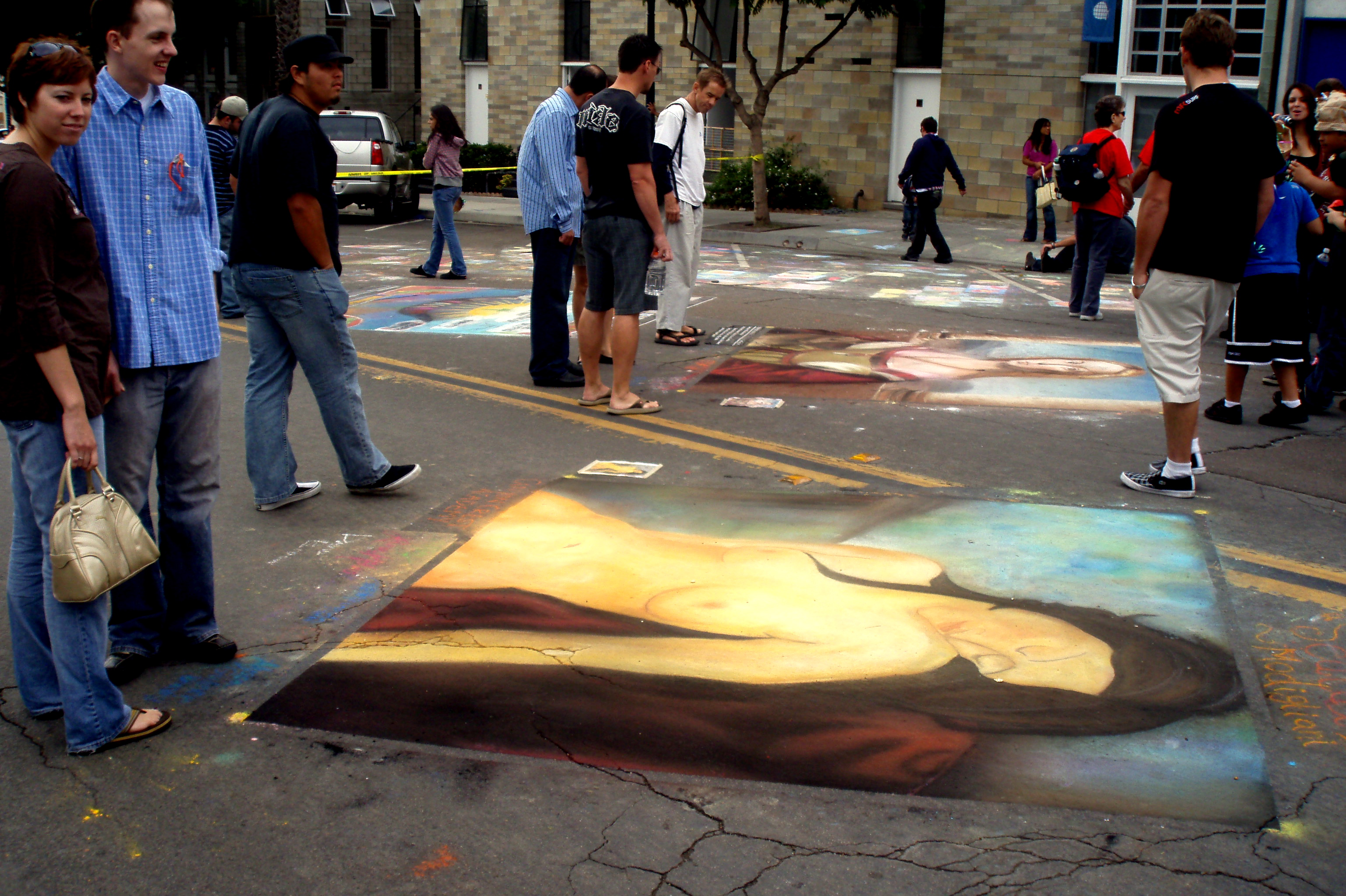
2007 Corso degli Artisti Street Painting Festival in San Diego's Little Italy.

== Tourism ==
San Diego houses many tourist attractions, such as the San Diego Zoo, Balboa Park, USS Midway Museum, San Diego Zoo Safari Park, SeaWorld, Belmont Park, and nearby Legoland. Spanish influence on the city can be seen in the many historic sites across San Diego, such as Mission San Diego de Alcalá, Old Town San Diego State Historic Park, and Cabrillo National Monument. Cuisine in San Diego is diverse, but there is an abundance of wood fired California-style pizzas and Mexican and East Asian cuisine. Annual events in San Diego include the San Diego County Fair, San Diego Comic-Con, and The Sentry.

== Military ==
San Diego has been a military town for more than 100 years. Present-day reflections of that tradition include tributes to military history such as the USS Midway Museum and Fort Rosecrans National Cemetery, as well as numerous smaller memorials throughout the city. Annual events celebrating the military include Fleet Week and the Miramar Air Show.

== Cuisine ==
=== Food ===
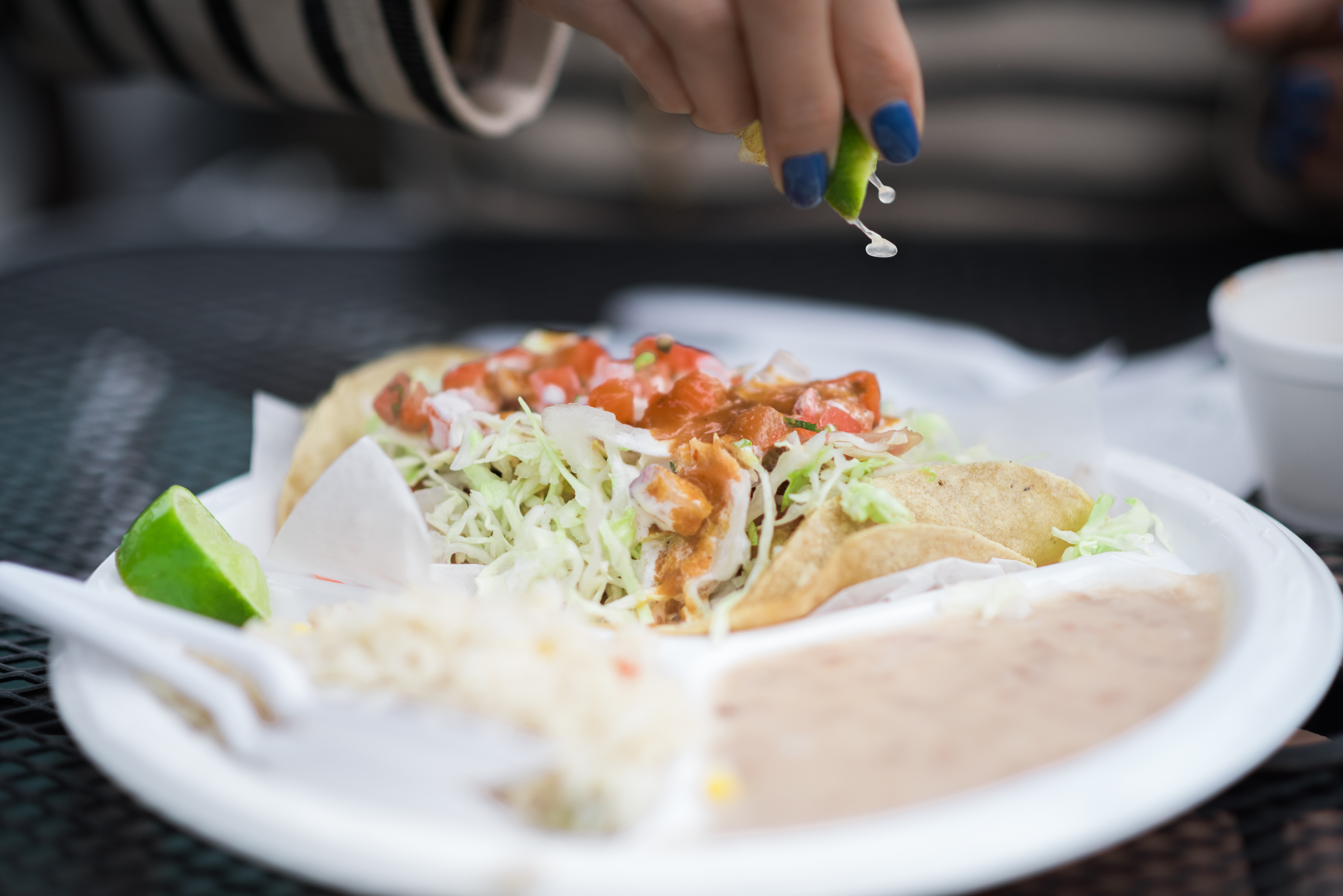
Fish taco

Because of its ethnic and cultural mix, San Diego has a wide range of cuisines. One can find Mexican, Italian, French, Spanish, Thai, Filipino, Vietnamese, Greek, Latin, German, Indian, Central and East Asian, Middle Eastern and Pacific Islander food throughout the city. In addition, there are numerous seafood restaurants and steakhouses. The city's long history and close proximity to Mexico has endowed the area with an extensive variety of authentic Mexican restaurants. Regional homemade specialties, border fare and haute cuisine are all readily available.

San Diego's warm, dry climate and access to the ocean have also made it a center for fishing and for growing fruits and vegetables. Long a center of the tuna industry, San Diego benefits from an abundant supply of seafood.

Many of the most popular restaurants can be found in the Gaslamp Quarter, Little Italy, La Jolla, Hillcrest and Old Town.

Local specialties include:

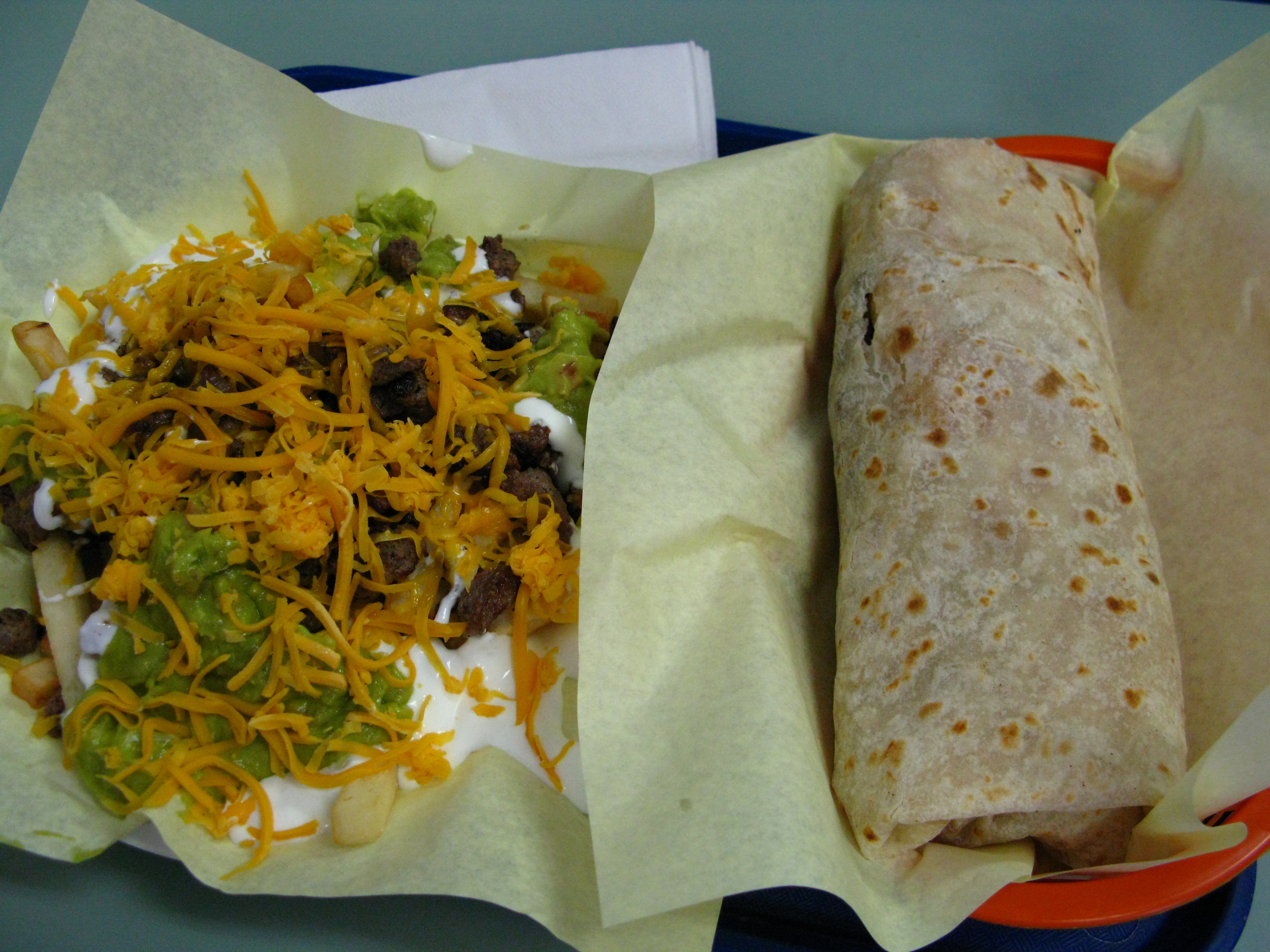
Carne asada fries & California burrito

- Mexican-American (carne asada, California burritos, fish tacos, carne asada fries, rolled tacos (or flautas), etc)
- Asian-American (Nat'l City salt & pepper chicken wings, mac & cheese lumpia, adobo chicken & waffles, etc)
- "Mexipino" fusion (birria lumpia, tocino or longanisa burrito, etc.)
- Italian-American (wood-fired California-style pizza, Busalacchi Spiedini, Fiori di zucca/Tempura Squash Blossoms, Deconstructed cannoli, Grandma’s Stracciatella soup)
- East Mediterranean (San Diego kebab wrap)
- Local wines (San Pasqual Valley, Rancho Bernardo, Julian)
- Locally produced (from the mountains near Julian) hard and sweet apple cider and Julian apple pie
- Various fruits and vegetables (including avocados, Mission figs, lemons, strawberries, grapes, apples, etc)

Several chain restaurants made their start in San Diego. These include Jack in the Box (1951), Pat & Oscar's (1991), Souplantation (March 1978), Rubio's (1983), Roberto's Taco Shop (1964), Broken Yolk Cafe (1979), Hash House A Go Go (2000) Better Buzz (2002), The Kebab Shop (2007), Burger Lounge (2007).

=== Beer ===
San Diego County has an active craft brewing community featuring more than 100 active local brewpubs and microbreweries. San Diego is one of many cities referred to as "America's craft beer capital". Many specialty beer styles have originated in San Diego, notably the American Double India Pale Ale (Double IPA).

None of San Diego's original 20th century breweries (such as Aztec Brewing Company which was closed in 1953) survived the spread of big national brewing companies, although the eponymous beer brewed in the neighboring Mexican city of Tecate dates from this era and is still widely available. The first of the new wave of local breweries and brewpubs was the Karl Strauss Brewing Company which opened in 1989. A second wave of microbrew companies was led by Port, Stone (now the largest local brewer) and Alesmith. Annual events celebrating San Diego's beer culture include San Diego Beer Week in November and numerous local craft beer festivals.

== Arts ==
=== Visual art ===
Several art museums, such as the San Diego Museum of Art, the Timken Museum of Art, the Mingei International Museum featuring folk art, and the Museum of Photographic Arts are located in Balboa Park. The Museum of Contemporary Art San Diego is located in an oceanfront building in La Jolla and has a branch located downtown at Santa Fe Depot.

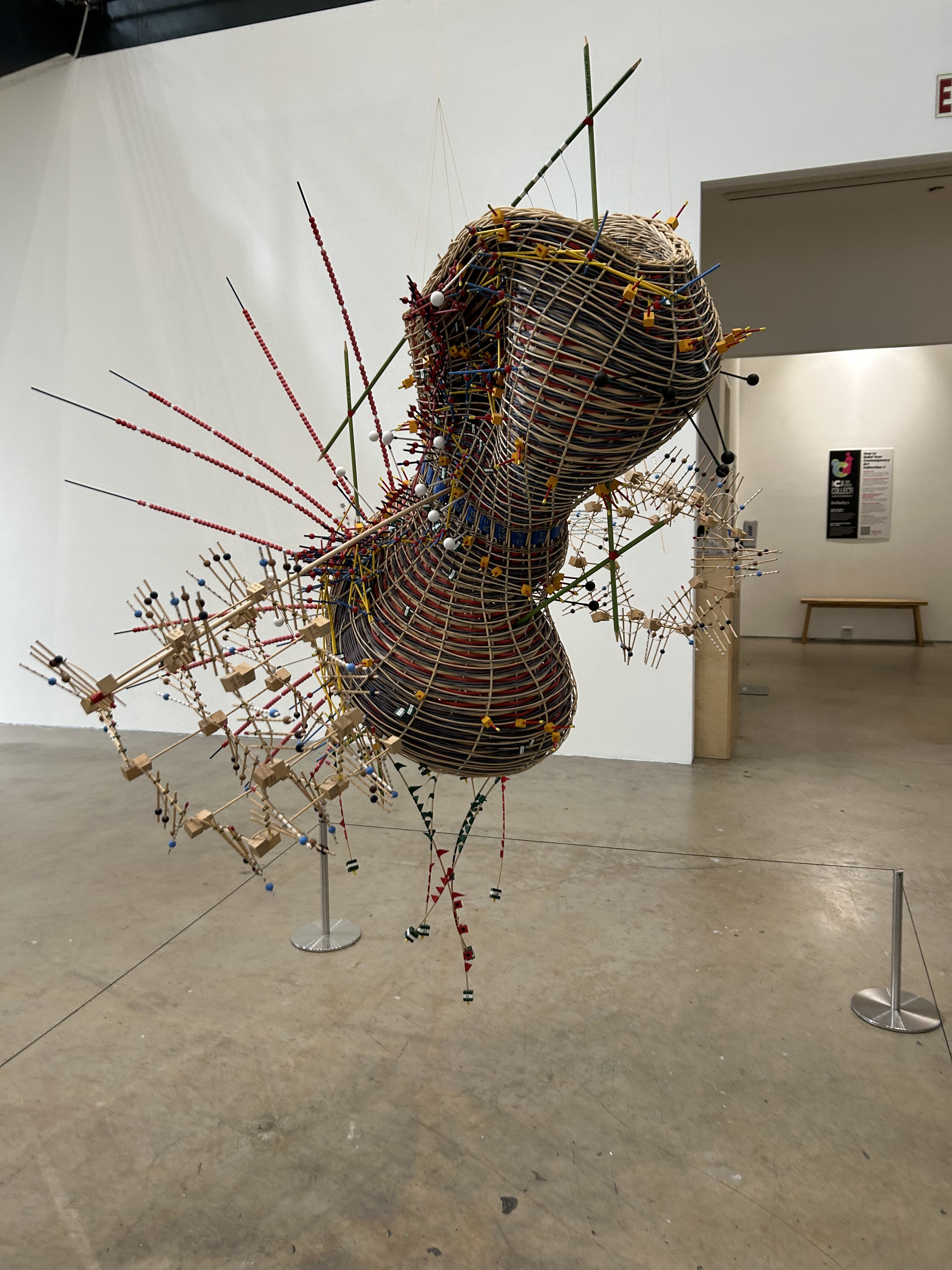
Image of art piece from the newest exhibit.

The Institute of Contemporary Arts, San Diego (ICA), focuses on experimental and contemporary art. Its headquarters is located at 1439 El Prado, known as ICA Central, and there is a branch in Encinitas, known as ICA North.

Balboa Park hosts dozens of museums and gardens, including the Museum of Us, the San Diego Natural History Museum, the Fleet Science Center, and the San Diego Air & Space Museum. The San Diego Children's Museum is located downtown. The Columbia district on San Diego Bay is home to Star of India and seven other floating museum ships and boats belonging to the Maritime Museum of San Diego, as well as the unrelated USS Midway Museum featuring the aircraft carrier USS Midway.

"Kettner Nights" at the Art and Design District in Little Italy has art and design exhibitions throughout many retail design stores and galleries on selected Friday nights. "Ray at Night" at North Park host a variety of small-scale art galleries on the second Saturday evening of each month. La Jolla and nearby Solana Beach also have a variety of art galleries.

=== Media ===
Many novels, films and television shows take place in San Diego. Almost Famous, Bring It On, Citizen Kane, Some Like It Hot, Top Gun and its sequel were set in and filmed there. Hotel del Coronado, Balboa Park and downtown San Diego have been the filming location for multiple films and television shows.

=== Music ===
The San Diego Symphony performs on a regular basis at Jacobs Music Center and other venues. The San Diego Opera at Civic Center Plaza, directed by Ian Campbell, was ranked by Opera America as one of the top 10 opera companies in the United States. The San Diego Master Chorale performs both alone and with the San Diego Symphony. Other musical organizations include the La Jolla Symphony and Chorus, La Jolla Music Society, the Greater San Diego Chamber Orchestra, the San Diego Concert Band, and the music departments of San Diego State University, the University of California, San Diego, University of San Diego, and Point Loma Nazarene University. Free concerts of organ music are presented regularly at the Spreckels Organ Pavilion, the world's largest outdoor pipe organ, in Balboa Park.

San Diego boasts one of the most eclectic local music scenes in California. Once dubbed the "Next Seattle" during the independent rock craze of the early to mid-1990s, San Diego's clubs and cafes have produced such pioneering rock acts as Blink-182, Stone Temple Pilots, Pierce the Veil, P.O.D., Switchfoot, As I Lay Dying, Three Mile Pilot, Rocket From the Crypt, Pinback, Thingy, Drive Like Jehu, Unbroken, Swing Kids, Creedle, Battalion of Saints, Manual Scan, Beat Farmers, the Paladins, the Bigfellas, Morlocks, Crash Worship, Greyboy Allstars, Boilermaker, the Black Heart Procession, the Album Leaf, Tristeza, and Pitchfork, among countless others. Singer-songwriter Erika Davies is a notable lounge music local act.

CRSSD Festival has been a mainstay in the California electronic dance music circuit since 2015. It's held in San Diego twice a year.

Artists from other genres have emerged and found success. Frank Zappa briefly operated in San Diego with progressive band The Mothers of Invention. Renowned singer-songwriter Tom Waits also spent a long period of his life in Southern California at the start of his career, including San Diego.

Hip-Hop has also had a scene in San Diego, drawing influences from styles across the country, with artists like Rob Stone citing both west coast gangster rap and Atlanta styles as influences. Figures in the culture like DJ Artistic have held influence within the San Diego region, whereas rappers like Nick Cannon went on to experience wider success as mainstream entertainers.

=== Theater ===
The Old Globe Theatre at Balboa Park has been in operation for more than 70 years and produces about 15 plays and musicals annually. La Jolla Playhouse at UC San Diego produces both original and touring works and is directed by Christopher Ashley. Both the Old Globe Theatre and the La Jolla Playhouse have produced the world premieres of plays and musicals that have gone on to win Tony Awards on Broadway. More than three dozen local productions have gone on to Broadway; four have won one or more Tonys. In 1984 the Old Globe Theatre received the Regional Theatre Tony Award, and the La Jolla Playhouse received the same award in 1993. The Joan B. Kroc Theatre at Kroc Center's Performing Arts Center is a 600-seat state-of-the-art theatre that hosts music, dance and theatre performances. Serving the northeastern part of San Diego is the California Center for the Arts in Escondido, a 400-seat performing arts theater. Other professional theatrical production companies include Lyric Opera San Diego, specializing in comic operas, operettas, and musical comedies, and the Starlight Musical Theatre, presenting musical comedies in the outdoor Starlight Bowl. Both the Lyric Opera and Starlight sought bankruptcy protection in 2011 and are currently inactive. Starlight is now under new management and being rebuilt to operate as an event space. www.savestarlight.org There are also numerous semiprofessional and amateur theatrical productions throughout the year by such groups as Cygnet Theatre, Christian Community Theater, Vanguard Theater, Lamb's Players Theater, Diversionary Theatre, and San Diego Junior Theatre.

== Annual events ==
*Adams Avenue Roots Festival in Normal Heights
- Adams Avenue Street Fair in Normal Heights
- America's Finest City Half Marathon
- Art Walk, the largest art event in the San Diego region in Little Italy
- Art Walk on the bay in the Marina district
- Asian Film Festival
- Cabrillo Festival commemorates the discovery of San Diego Bay by Juan Rodriguez Cabrillo
- Carnevale, a Venetian mask and costume competition in Little Italy
- ConDor - San Diego's Oldest SF&Fantasy Convention
- San Diego Comic-Con
- The Sentry
- Festivale Siciliano in Little Italy
- Fleet Week
- Gator by the Bay Zydeco & Blues Festival
- Holiday Bowl
- Horrible Imaginings Film Festival
- San Diego Jewish Film Festival
- ¡Latin Food Fest!
- Latino Film Festival
- MCAS Miramar Air Show
- Italian Motorsport Show in Little Italy
- Oceanside International Film Festival in Oceanside
- Open Air Book Fair Archived 2006-09-08 at the Wayback Machine in Hillcrest
- Over-the-line at Fiesta Island
- Parade of Lights on San Diego Bay in December
- Portuguese U.P.S.E.S. Festa and Parade throughout neighborhoods of Point Loma
- Precious Festa, the largest Italian festival in the Western U.S. in Little Italy
- San Diego Crew Classic on Mission Bay
- San Diego/Del Mar Fair in the nearby city of Del Mar.
- San Diego Film Week
- San Diego International Film Festival
- San Diego Pride parade and festival in Hillcrest
- Street Scene Music Festival
- Underground Film Festival

== See also ==
- Media in San Diego
- Museums in San Diego
- City of San Diego Commission for Arts and Culture
