= Beer in San Diego County, California =

Beer in San Diego, California

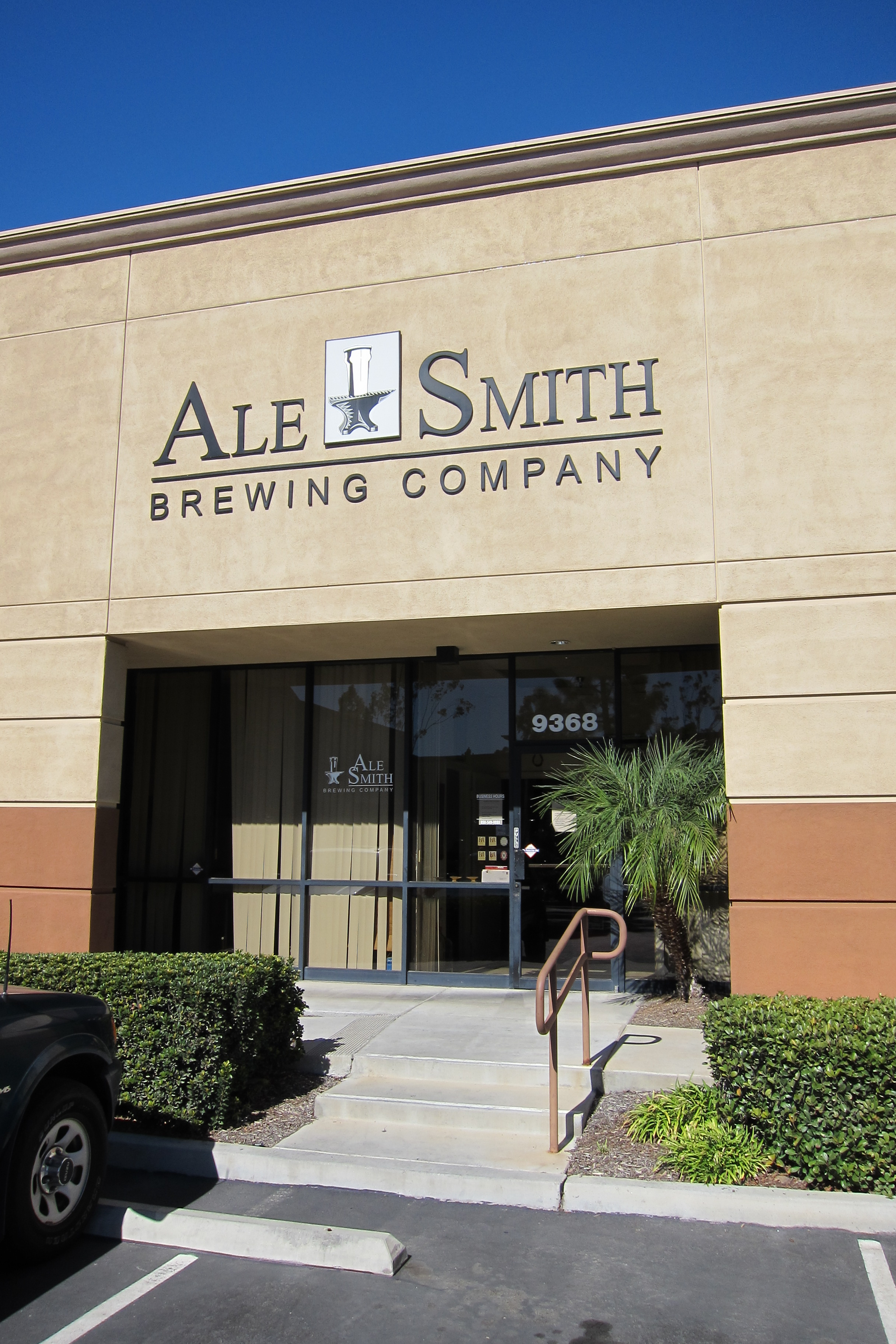
The previous location of AleSmith Brewing Company in San Diego

San Diego County, California, has been called "the Craft Beer Capital of America". As of 2018, the county was home to 155 licensed craft breweries – the most of any county in the United States. Based on 2016 sales volume, three San Diego County breweries – Stone, Green Flash, and Karl Strauss – rank among the 50 largest craft brewers in the United States. San Diego County brewers pioneered the specialty beer style known as Double India Pale Ale (Double IPA), sometimes called San Diego Pale Ale. Its beer culture is a draw for tourism, particularly during major festivals such as San Diego Beer Week and the San Diego International Beer Competition. San Diego County breweries including Stone Brewing Co., AleSmith Brewing Company and Ballast Point Brewing Company are consistently rated among the top breweries in the world.

== History ==
The San Diego Brewing Company opened in 1896 as the first commercial brewery in San Diego County; Alonzo Horton, the father of modern San Diego, was one of the founders. At the time it was the largest manufacturing enterprise in the county. It was located on 32nd street in San Diego. It closed in 1920 because of Prohibition. It reopened in 1935 and continued in operation until 1942, when it was displaced by Naval Base San Diego. A brewpub by the same name now operates in the Mission Valley neighborhood.

The old Mission Brewery building in San Diego

Mission Brewery, located in the Middletown neighborhood of San Diego, opened in 1913 and closed due to Prohibition. It was never reopened as a brewery, but the landmark five-story brick building was repurposed several times, for kelp extraction until the 1980s and ultimately as an office building, still in operation. The building was listed on the National Register of Historic Places in 1989. The name Mission Brewery was revived in 2007 by a brewery located in the historic Wonder Bread building in downtown San Diego.

The Aztec Brewing Company was founded in Mexicali in 1921 as Cerveceria Azteca SA. During Prohibition it helped to supply Americans with the beer they could not legally buy in the United States. The company moved to San Diego in 1933, following the repeal of Prohibition, and became San Diego's largest brewery. It was located on Main Street in Barrio Logan. It featured a large Rathskeller, or basement beer hall, decorated with murals, paintings, and woodcarvings by Jose Moya del Pino. By 1944 Aztec was the only brewery still operating in Southern California. The company was purchased by Altes Brewing Company in 1948; Altes was then bought by the National Brewing Company, which closed Aztec Brewing Company in 1953. For the next 36 years there was no local commercially brewed beer in San Diego County. The name Aztec Brewing Company has been revived in a Vista brewery which opened in 2011.

During Prohibition (1920–1933), San Diegans could still drink beer by crossing the border into Mexico. In the formerly small town of Tijuana more than 180 cantinas were built to serve American visitors, and the city's population grew tenfold between 1920 and 1930. Several modern breweries were built in Mexicali to supply the demand.

Before Prohibition there had been seven breweries in San Diego. After repeal there were three: Aztec Brewing Company, San Diego Brewing Company, and Balboa Brewing Company. These were soon either purchased by the Big Three national brewing companies (Anheuser-Busch, Coors, and Miller) or driven out of business by the aggressive marketing practices of the Big Three. From 1953 until the 1980s the local beer market was dominated by the large national brewers, with the alternative being imported beer from Mexico. But changes in national and state law in the late 1970s made home brewing legal, and in 1982 California allowed breweries to operate restaurants on their premises, which made brewpubs possible.

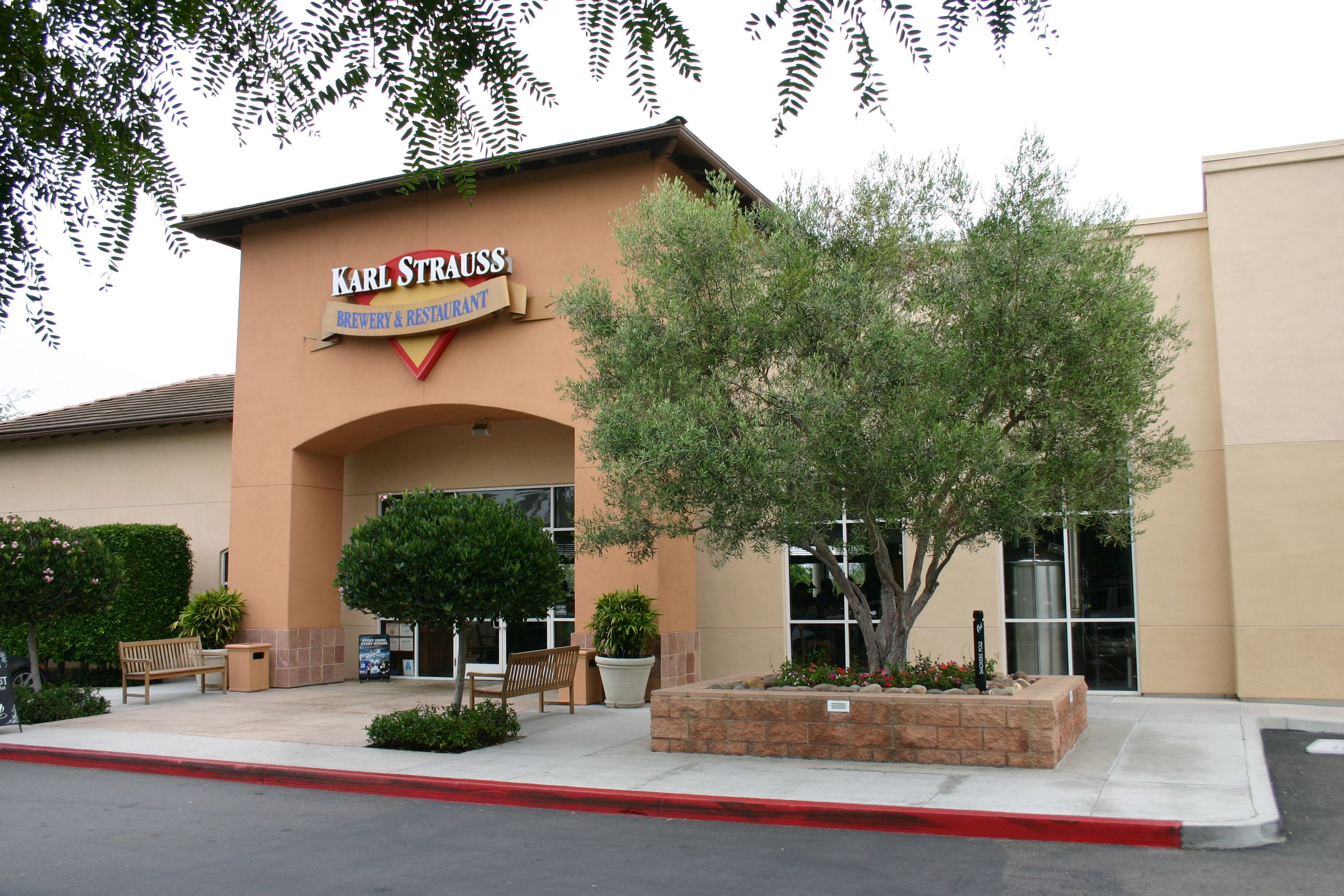
The Karl Strauss brewpub in Carlsbad

In 1989, Karl Strauss Brewing Company opened a brewery and brewpub on Columbia Street in downtown San Diego; the company expanded into distribution brewing in 1991. This was the first commercial brewery in San Diego since 1953, and for many San Diego consumers it was their first exposure to freshly brewed beer and to styles such as amber lager and pale ale. In the mid-1990s a second wave of craft breweries appeared, led by Pizza Port, Stone and Alesmith. The local craft beer movement was inspired in part by homebrewing hobbyists, supported by the storefront Home Brew Mart, which opened in 1992 and later spun off the Ballast Point Brewing Company.

Beer festivals promoted the new styles and educated a new generation of beer drinkers. In 1997 local brewers Tomme Arthur and Tom Nickel organized the first such event, the Strong Ale Festival (still an annual event), and in 1998 they added the Real Ale Festival (discontinued after 2012). Other festivals were added, and in 2009 the San Diego Brewers Guild launched an annual Beer Week. San Diego became so well established in the brewing world that the biennial World Beer Cup competition was held there in 2004; 11 medals (out of more than 200) went to locals. San Diego hosted the event again in 2008, taking 14 medals, and in 2012, taking 16 medals. At the 2015 Great American Beer Festival, San Diego County brewers brought home a total of 20 medals (6 gold, 2 silver, and 11 bronze).

The Great American Beer Festival's "Best Small Brewer" Award has gone to San Diego County brewers multiple times: 2004 (Tomme Arthur for Pizza Port Solana Beach), 2007 (Arthur for Port Brewing / Lost Abbey), 2008 (Alesmith), and 2011 (Yiga Miyashiro, Pizza Port Ocean Beach). Pizza Port Carlsbad won the Best Large Brewpub award in 2009, 2010, and 2011. The GABF "Best Mid-sized Brewery" award for 2016 went to Karl Strauss. The World Beer Cup's biennial "Best Small Brewer" award went to San Diego County Brewers in 2004 (Tom Nickel for Oggi's Pizza and Brewing), 2008 (Arthur for Port Brewing / Lost Abbey), 2010 (Ballast Point), and 2014 (Coronado Brewing Company).

In 2013–2014, the San Diego History Center featured a special exhibit on the history of beer in the county, titled "Bottled and Kegged: San Diego's Craft Beer Culture".

In 2024, in an annual competition hosted by USA Today, O'Brien's Pub was named the Best Beer Bar in America. The pub, founded in 1994, is located in the Kearny Mesa area of San Diego and is co-owned by Tom Nickel and Tyson Blake.

== Beer styles ==
San Diego County brewers produce the full range of craft beers, but they are best known for strongly-hopped, high-alcohol beers such as India Pale Ale (IPA), and particularly for an even stronger, hoppier style known as Double IPA. Double IPA beers are made with intensely aromatic, bitter hops, which result in a very bitter beer. A standard mass-produced American beer scores less than 20 on the International Bitterness Units (IBU) scale; an average IPA scores about 60 IBU; and a double IPA commonly scores 100 IBU or higher. The style was pioneered by brewer Vinnie Cilurzo at the now-defunct Blind Pig Brewery in Temecula in 1994; most breweries in San Diego County now produce a double IPA. Double IPA has been called San Diego's signature beer, and some people refer to Double IPA beers as San Diego Pale Ale.

== Economic impact ==
Brewing has been one of the fastest-growing business sectors in San Diego, with seven new licenses issued in 2010, fifteen in 2011 and eighteen in 2012. As of January 2019 the county contained 155 independent craft breweries - the largest number of craft brewers in a single county in the United States. For the year 2018 the industry was reported to have an economic impact of approximately $1.2 billion in 2018 and a total industry revenue of $848 million, providing an estimated 6,480 jobs. Beer-related tourism is an important part of San Diego County's visitor industry throughout the year; the county is described as a "beer city destination". Many breweries offer tours of their facilities and tasting rooms, and dozens of commercial tour operators market "beer tours" in San Diego County.

== Annual events ==
San Diego Beer Week, launched in 2009, is now a ten-day county-wide festival, held in early November and aimed at both local residents and tourists. It showcases the local beer scene and fosters knowledge about the area's brewing heritage. The festival kicks off with the San Diego Brewers Guild Festival and continues with hundreds of large and small events hosted by breweries, nano-breweries, pubs, and alehouses. In 2012 there were more than 500 events scheduled during Beer Week.

The San Diego International Beer Festival takes place during the San Diego County Fair every June. It includes seminars and classes, beer tasting, and beer judging. Participating breweries in 2013 came from 22 states and 16 countries. Other special beer events throughout the year include the San Diego Beer Festival in July, the San Diego Festival of Beer in September, and the Strong Ale Festival in December.

== Notable breweries ==
One-third of all the breweries in the county are located in the North County along the 60-mile (97 km) stretch of California State Route 78 from Oceanside to Julian. The route is sometimes called the "Hops Highway."

Stone Brewing Co. is the largest brewery in Southern California and the ninth largest craft brewery in the United States. Located in Escondido in San Diego's North County, it is known for hoppy, high-alcohol beers and an in-your-face attitude. (The company's best-known brand, Arrogant Bastard Ale, uses the slogan "Hated by many. Loved by few. You're not worthy.") Arrogant Bastard Ale is regarded as a "watershed beer" that "put San Diego on the craft brew map." Stone Pale Ale is their flagship brew. The company produces eight beers year-round, as well as special releases and collaborations. In addition to the brewery and tasting room it has two brewery restaurants, in Escondido and San Diego, and five "company stores". In 2014, Stone announced plans to open brewery restaurants in Richmond, Virginia and in Berlin, Germany. Both facilities opened in 2016; the Berlin operation was sold to a Scottish company in 2019.

Karl Strauss Brewing Company was the first brewery in San Diego since 1953 and launched the current wave of breweries. It is now the third largest brewery in San Diego County. It operates a production brewery in San Diego's Pacific Beach neighborhood as well as eight brewery restaurants in San Diego, Orange, Los Angeles and Riverside counties. The company's flagship brew is Karl Strauss Amber Lager. Its best selling beer, Red Trolley Ale, won gold medals in its category at both the Great American Beer Festival (2011 and 2013) and the World Beer Cup (2010 and 2012).

Ballast Point Brewing Company was opened in 1996. In 2010 the company was named the World Champion Small Brewery at the World Beer Cup. In 2015, the company was acquired by Constellation Brands.

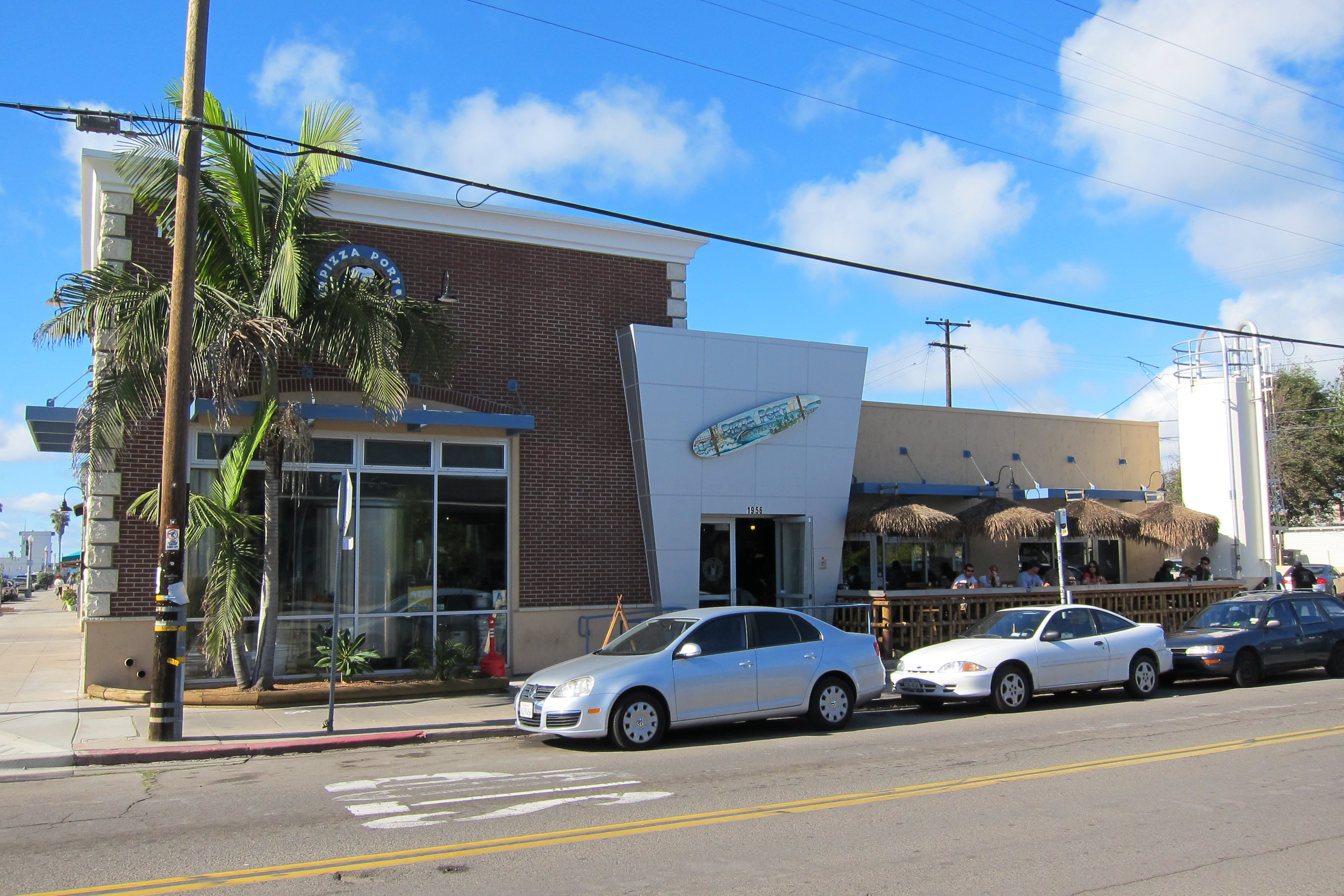
The Pizza Port brewpub in Ocean Beach

The five brewpubs of Pizza Port, together with its spinoffs Port Brewing Company (San Marcos) and Lost Abbey (Vista), have won dozens of medals in international competition. Pizza Port started brewing commercially in 1992; in 1994, it became the first-ever San Diego brewery to win a medal at the Great American Beer Festival. The Great American Beer Festival named Pizza Port's Carlsbad location the "best large brewpub" in 2009, 2010 and 2011. Port Brewing/Lost Abbey was named the "Small Brewing Company and Small Brewing Company Brewer of the Year" at the Great American Beer Festival in 2007, and the Best Small Brewing Company at the World Beer Cup event in 2008.

AleSmith Brewing Company, located in San Diego, was founded in 1995. Many of their beers are strongly hopped and high in alcoholic content. It was the most popular brewery on RateBeer's surveys in 2004 and 2005. In 2008, AleSmith was awarded "Small Brewing Company and Small Brewing Company Brewer of the Year" at the Great American Beer Festival.

== See also ==
- List of breweries in San Diego County, California
