= True Craft =

Fund assisting independent craft beer brewers

- Products: Craft brewery angel investor
- Founder: Greg Koch, Steve Wagner
- Key people: Greg Koch
- Established: 29 April 2016
- Disestablished: 2019
- Funding: Private
- Status: Inactive

True Craft was a $100M fund announced in April 2016 with the goal of assisting independent craft brewers. The fund, announced by Stone Brewing Company founders Greg Koch and Steve Wagner, was intended to buy small stakes in interested craft brewers, but no more than 25%. This would allow brewers to continue to operate independently without having to borrow from banks, sell to traditional venture capitalists, or sell to multinational conglomerates. The initiative was discontinued in 2019 after reportedly being unsuccessful in matching the high purchase prices being offered by the larger beer brands.

== History ==
It was reported that the term "True Craft Brewing" was trademarked by Stone Brewing Company Koch in October 2015.

The venture was first announced at the 2016 EG Conference held April 29, 2016 at Carmel, California. The Los Angeles Times reported that the founders of Stone Brewing had been working on the concept for a year before making the announcement, which was made before all the details were worked out due to news that an Anheuser-Busch-owned brewery, Bend, Oregon-based 10 Barrel, was planning to open a brewpub in East Village, San Diego later in 2016.

On June 28, 2019, Koch confirmed "That hasn't been active for some months," Koch said. "It was an idea that never came to fruition." Koch cited the high purchase prices being offered by Constellation Brands and InBev made it too hard for a fund of the size of True Craft to be effective. The fund was closed without making any investments.
