= San Diego Brewing Company =

- Industry: Brewing (Beer)
- Founded: San Diego, California, 1896
- Defunct: 1942
- Headquarters: San Diego, California, U.S.

San Diego Brewing Company was a brewery in San Diego, California.

== History ==
San Diego Brewing Company opened in 1896 as the first commercial brewery in San Diego County. It was financed by wealthy locals including John D. Spreckels and quickly became the largest manufacturing enterprise in the county. It was located on 32nd street in San Diego. It operated on a large scale; in 1906 it added a state-of-the-art, 100-ton compressor for refrigeration.

At first the company delivered kegs of beer in horse-drawn wagons; by 1914 it had switched to motor vehicles. The brewery delivered 140,000 barrels a year, locally to saloons and hotel bars, as well as out of town by rail, shipping beer as far as San Francisco and Arizona. The company acquired several other local breweries, including Mission Brewery, and in 1914 it took the name San Diego Consolidated Brewing Company.

The company stopped brewing in 1920 because of Prohibition. For a time it produced a near beer called Hopski, but in 1925 it abandoned that as well. In 1935, with the passage of the Twenty-first Amendment to the U.S. Constitution repealing the Eighteenth Amendment to the U.S. Constitution, the company resumed brewing operations. It continued in operation until 1942, when it was displaced by the U.S. Navy's Naval Base San Diego.

== Current brewery ==
A brewpub by the same name now operates in the Grantville neighborhood of San Diego.

== See also ==
- Beer in San Diego County, California
- List of breweries in San Diego County, California
- List of breweries in California
- List of defunct breweries in the United States
