= Ballast Point Brewing Company =

Brewery in San Diego, California

- Interactive map of Ballast Point Brewing Company
- Location: San Diego, California, United States
- Coordinates: 32°53′15.12″N 117°9′28.91″W
- Opened: 1996
- Key people: Jack White (founder)
- Owner: Kings & Convicts Brewing Co.
- Website: www.ballastpoint.com

Active beers
Name	Type
Sculpin IPA	India Pale Ale
Grapefruit Sculpin	India Pale Ale
Aloha Sculpin	Hazy India Pale Ale
Big Gus	India Pale Ale
Wee Gus	Hoppy Lager
Swingin' Friar Ale	Pale Ale
Fathom	India Pale Ale
Passing Haze	Hazy India Pale Ale
Longfin Lager	Lager
Manta Ray	Double India Pale Ale
California Kölsch	Kölsch
Wahoo	Witbier

Seasonal beers
Name	Type
Pumpkin Down	Scottish Ale with Pumpkin
Victory at Sea	Imperial Porter

Other beers
Name	Type
Chai Victory at Sea	Chai Imperial Porter
Blood Orange	Lager
Pinstripe	Lager
American Pilsner	Pilsner
Calico	Amber Ale
Habanero Sculpin	Habanero India Pale Ale
High West Barrel Aged Victory at Sea	Barrel Aged Imperial Porter

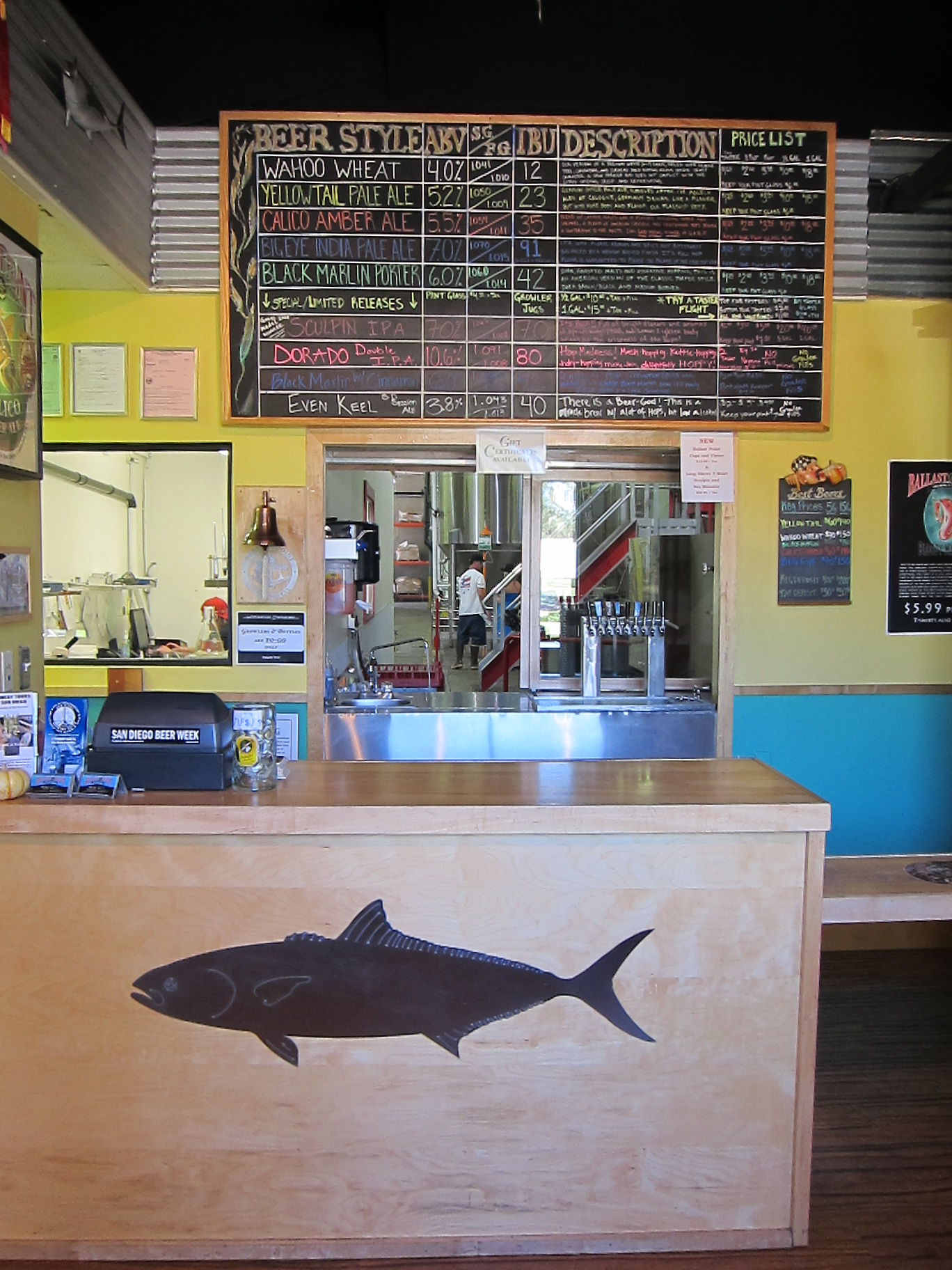
Tasting room in the brewery

Ballast Point Brewing Company is an American brewery founded in 1996 by Jack White in San Diego, California. Ballast Point Brewing Co. started in the back of Home Brew Mart, a homebrew supply store White founded in 1992. As of 2015, it was the second largest brewer in San Diego County and the 17th largest brewery in the country based on sales volume. The company's main production facility is in Miramar. It also has brewery locations in San Diego's Little Italy and Scripps Ranch neighborhoods, as well as its original Home Brew Mart location in San Diego's Linda Vista neighborhood. In 2017, Ballast Point opened its first East Coast brewing facility in Daleville, Virginia, near Roanoke.

Ballast Point was also the first microdistillery in San Diego since Prohibition. The brewery was sold to Constellation Brands for $1 billion in 2015. Its distillery business was spun off to a new company, Cutwater Spirits, in 2017 and subsequently purchased by Anheuser-Busch in 2019. In December 2019, Chicago-based brewery Kings and Convicts announced it was buying Ballast Point from Constellation for undisclosed terms.

== History ==
Founder Jack White developed a taste for beer in college. He and his college roommate Pete A’Hearn began home brewing in their apartment at UCLA. They found they had trouble obtaining the various supplies and ingredients they wanted, and had no access to other home brewers to share ideas with.

In 1992, White opened Home Brew Mart in San Diego, selling the supplies and ingredients needed by home brewers. The shop also became a place where home brewers could communicate and share ideas with each other. Many of Home Brew Mart's customers went on to found breweries of their own, and the store has been credited with helping to launch San Diego County's reputation as a craft beer mecca.

While White ran Home Brew Mart and dreamed of starting his own brewery, A'Hearn went off to the University of California, Davis, to get a master brewer's certificate. He became the company's founding brewmaster; however, he left the company soon after the launch of the brewery and became a science teacher. The two hired Yuseff Cherney, an award-winning home brewer, as Home Brew Mart's first employee. A'Hearn and Cherney developed a “back room” brewery behind the shop, and in 1996, Ballast Point Brewing was born. The company takes its name from Ballast Point, a historically important site on San Diego Bay in Point Loma.

By 2004, Ballast Point had outgrown its back room location and moved into a larger production brewery in Scripps Ranch. In September 2013, Ballast Point added a third location: a brewery, tasting room, and restaurant in San Diego's Little Italy neighborhood, which functions as the company's laboratory for research and development. By the end of 2013, Ballast Point had outgrown Scripps Ranch. In mid-2014, Ballast Point finished construction on a 107,000 square foot brewery in the Miramar area equipped to support the brewery's growth. Two large copper kettles discovered in a brewery in Lohr, Germany are the centerpiece of this new brewery headquarters, which also features a laboratory, tasting bar, and restaurant.

In 2008, Ballast Point Spirits was founded, with Old Grove Gin as its first product released. The Ballast Point Spirits family eventually included 14 spirits, as well as 2 cocktail mixers: Bloody Mary and Mai Tai.

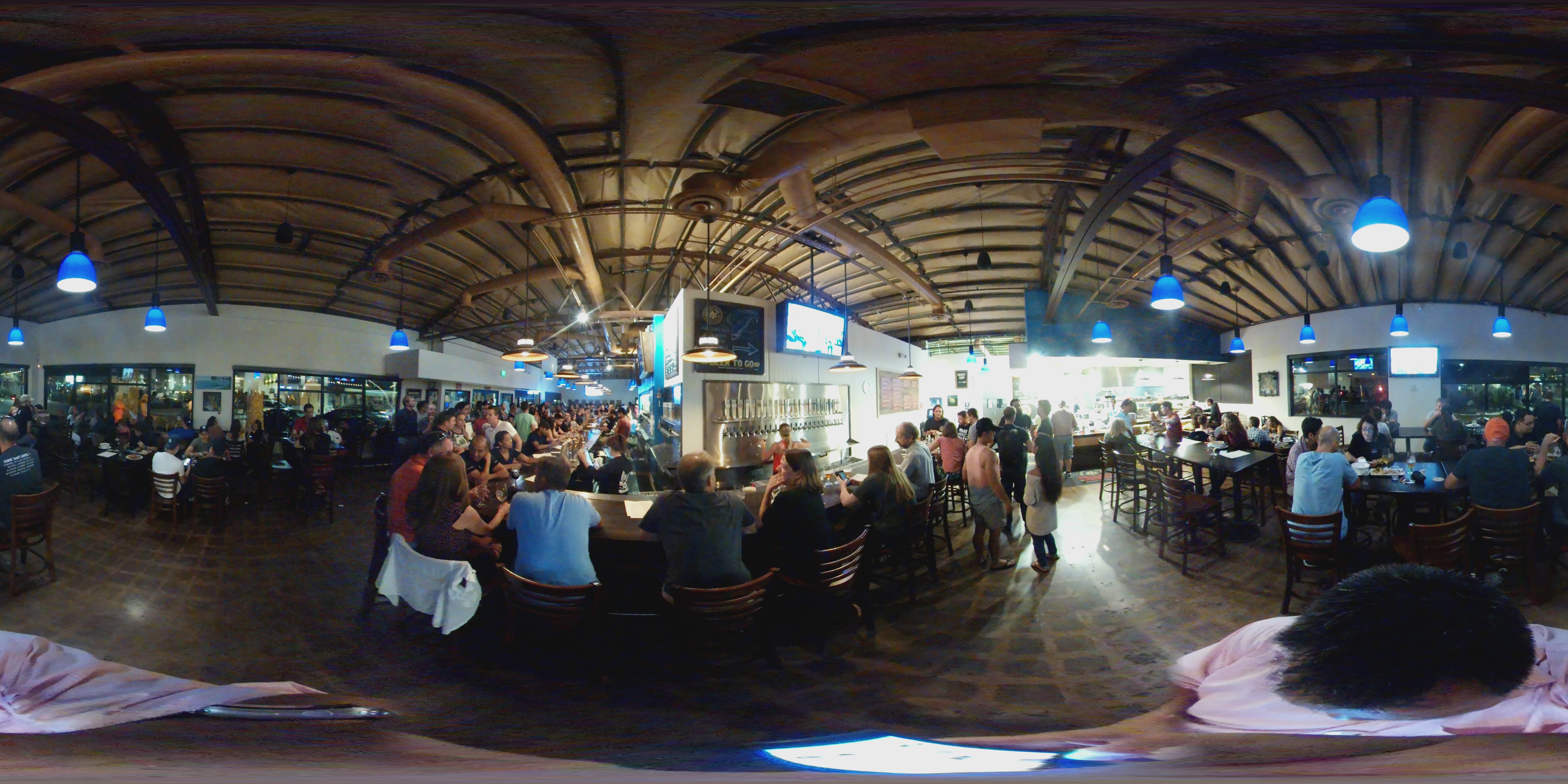
Ballast Point tasting room in San Diego, Little Italy, 2013

White served as CEO from the company's inception in 1992 until 2015. In 2012 Jim Buechler became the company's president and general manager, and in June 2015 he became president and CEO, leaving White with the title of Founder. Cherney is the company's chief operations officer and head brewer.

In October 2015 Ballast Point Brewing & Spirits Inc. filed an initial public offering of stock. This offering would make it the first of San Diego County's breweries to go public. However, on November 15, 2015, Constellation Brands announced it would acquire Ballast Point Brewing & Spirits for $1 billion. The acquisition, which was completed in December 2015, was financed with a combination of debt and cash.

By July 2016, four of the founders of the company, including founder White, chief operating officer Cherney, and CEO Buechler, left the company to "pursue other interests". Marty Birkel was named the new president of the brewery. The departures reportedly stemmed from disputes with the new owner, Constellation Brands, over the status of Ballast Point's distilled spirits operation, which was not part of the sale. After leaving Ballast Point, White and Cherney moved the spirits operation to Cutwater Spirits, a new company they founded in 2017.

In December 2019, it was announced that Chicago-based brewery Kings and Convicts was buying Ballast Point from Constellation for undisclosed terms, which industry observers estimate to be between $75 million and $200 million. Constellation was reportedly having trouble integrating the brand with their larger operations. At its peak under Constellation, Ballast Point's sales were at 431,000 barrels. At the time of the announcement, early estimates for 2019 were north of 200,000. Meanwhile, Ballast Point's trademark value had dropped over 90 percent from $223 million in January 2018 to $17 million in October 2019.

In April 2024 Kings & Convicts Brewing closed down Ballast Point Brewing’s Miramar-based brewery resulting in a series of staff lay offs. It is unclear if the beer is now produced as contract brew in third party breweries or within the former Saint Archers Facilities in Miramar.

As of December 2019, they sold 16 different styles of beer.

== East Coast expansion ==
On June 12, 2017, Ballast Point opened its new East Coast Brewery and Tap Room in Daleville, part of Virginia's Roanoke Valley. The facility began producing beer in September 2017, with the first keg of Grapefruit Sculpin being sent to Virginia governor Terry McAuliffe in Richmond. On September 29, 2019, Constellation Brands closed the taproom and restaurant areas of the facility in Daleville, cutting 41 employees.

== Awards ==
In 2010, Ballast Point won three gold medals for their beers, as well as the "Small Brewery Champion" award, at the World Beer Cup.

In 2013 and 2014, Ballast Point's distillery arm was named the California Distillery of the Year two years in a row at the New York International Spirits Competition.

== See also ==
- Beer in San Diego County, California
- List of breweries in San Diego County, California
