= Don't Change the Subject =

- Directed by: Mike Stutz
- Produced by: Matt Ima, Fiona Walsh
- Cinematography: Jay Lafayette
- Edited by: Gail Yasunaga
- Music by: Charlie Recksieck, The Bigfellas
- Release date: 2012
- Running time: 97 minutes
- Country: United States
- Language: English

Don't Change the Subject is a 2012 documentary film executive produced and directed by Mike Stutz, focusing on suicide and attempts to deal with the subject more directly through the use of humor and the arts as well as interviews. The film weaves in and out of three modes: 1) Stutz' experience with suicide in his family; 2) Candid interviews with suicide survivors and experts in fields such as mental health, religion, theater; and 3) Commissioning artists to create works for the film that tackle suicide in a unique way.

== Synopsis ==
The movie begins with frank, humorous interviews of two men who set out to kill themselves and then moves into a Day of the Dead celebration where the guests celebrate the lives of those whom they have lost. Director Stutz questions his family about his mother's suicide in 1979 and how little they've actually discussed it, visiting his mother's grave site with his sister and listening to old tapes of their mother. He talks to several survivors and experts before commissioning several artists to come up with works about suicide: A band (The Bigfellas) agrees to make a song about suicide "that you can dance to"; an illustrator (Patrick Horvath) is to make short animated films (which run through the documentary as interstitials); a choreographer (Danielle Peig) chooses to create a dance piece based on two autopsy reports; and a standup comedian (Duncan Trussell) compiles material for his act about suicide with the help of several top comedy writers. Meanwhile, Stutz continues to interview and engage his family about his mother's death, eventually staging his mother's suicide (where he discovered her unconscious at the age of 12) on screen with members of the "avant-garde circus" troupe, The Lucent Dossier Experience.

As some of the interviews take a turn from the dark to the more cathartic, the tone of the movie brightens at the end during the performances of the artistic material. The interview subjects give positive, inspiring messages to the audience about things they can actively do to help prevent suicides and connect more deeply with those they love. The movie closes with images of another ceremony at the ocean which bookends the Day of the Dead images from the beginning of the film.

== Release ==
The film be officially released in Fall 2012 at a suicide arts festival in Los Angeles being produced by the makers of the film. Sneak preview screenings and showings at colleges, mental health organizations have already commenced as of early 2012.

== Critical reception ==
Some in the mental health community have called into question the issues of contagion, but many others have disputed this position and overall reviews have been positive.
