= CRSSD Festival =

American music festival

- Genre: House, techno, electro, and Indie dance
- Dates: March, September
- Frequency: Biannually
- Locations: Waterfront Park, San Diego, California, United States
- Years active: 11 years
- Inaugurated: March 14, 2015
- Attendance: 30,000 (2024, 2 days total at Waterfront Park)
- Capacity: 15,000 (per day at Waterfront Park)
- Organiser: FNGRS CRSSD
- Website: crssdfest.com

CRSSD Festival is an electronic dance music (EDM) festival held in San Diego, California, twice a year, in March and September. It is held at Waterfront Park in downtown San Diego. The festival is organized by the local event agency FNGRS CRSSD.

== History ==
The two-day festival was first held in 2015 at the newly built Waterfront Park in San Diego. The park has lawns and large walk-in fountains. A mix of electronic and independent music is performed on three stages. There were 15,000 attendees per day at CRSSD Festival Spring 2024. CRSSD Festival is pronounced as “crossed festival”.

== Information per edition ==
| Year | Date | Event | Location | On stage |
|---|---|---|---|---|
| 2015 | March 14–15 | CRSSD Festival | Waterfront Park, San Diego | Aeroplane, Bakermat, Bixel Boys, Breakbot, Carmada, Giraffage, Jamie Jones, Klangkarussell, Nina Las Vegas, Pleasure State, Roman Flügel, Seth Troxler, Simian Mobile Disco, SNBRN, Thomas Jack, Treasure Fingers, Viceroy, Wax Motif |
| 2016 | March 5–6 | CRSSD Festival | Waterfront Park, San Diego | Adriatique, Ardalan, Ben UFO, Bondax, Cassian, Chet Faker, Cirez D, Claude VonStroke, Colour Vision, Damian Lazarus, Gessafelstein (DJ Set), Gorgon City (DJ Set), Gorgon City (live), Green Velvet, Gryffin, Hi-Lo, Hot Since 82, J.Phlip, Jamie Jones, Jeremy Orlander, Jon Hopkins, Julio Bashmore, Kidnap Kid, Lane 8, Lee Foss, Lee K, Loco Dice, Odesza, Poolside, REZZ, Ryan Hemsworth, Sacha Robotti, Sam Gellaitry, Skream, Skyler Spence, Tale of Us, Tiga, Tom Trago, Tycho, Walker & Royce, Will Clarke |
| 2017 | September 30 & October 1 | CRSSD Festival | Waterfront Park, San Diego | RUFUS DU SOL, Chromeo, Cut Copy, Mura Masa, Broods, FKJ (live), Breakbot, Sohn, Damian Lazarus & The Ancient Moons, Phantoms, Elohim, Lophile, Cooper Saver, Hot Since 82, The Magician, The Black Madonna, Emancipator, Gerd Janson b2b Prins Thomas, Destructo, Solardo, Chris Lake, Detlef, Latmun, Palms Trax, Denis Sulta, Saint Wknd, Dena Amy, Richie Hawtin, Dixon, Marcel Dettmann, Patrick, Topping, Kink (live), Floorplan, Mathew Jonson (live), Prok & Fitch, Bedouin, Jesse Rose, Julia Govor, Ashworth, Lee K, Hito, Alex Wax |
| 2018 | September 29–30 | CRSSD Festival Fall | Waterfront Park, San Diego | George Fitzgerald, Dusky, Will Clarke, Thomas Jack, Darius, Detlef, Leftwing : Kody, Dateless, Dillon Nathaniel, Euføeni, Nina Kraviz, Louis The Child, Marian Hill, Sofi Tukker, Hayden James, Pnau, Autograf, Naations, Claptone, Enzo Siragusa, Anti Up, AC Slater b2b Jack Beats, Mija, Oliver, Cut Snake b2b Ardalan, Melé, Flamingosis, Erick Diaz, Mind Against, Matador, John Digweed, Yotto, Guy J b2b Jeremy Olander, Pig&Dan, Shelley Johansson, Rivka M, Bob Moses, Big Wild, Flight Facilities, Kiiara, Mount Kimbie, Elderbrook, Shallou, White Cliffs |
| 2019 | September 28–29 | CRSSD Festival Fall | Waterfront Park, San Diego | Allezar Brookes, George Smeddles, Kevin Knapp, Krystal Klear, Little Boots, Yung Bae, Derrick Carter b2b Mark Farina, Audiojack, Eli & Fur, Yaeji, Maze & Masters, Bec, Tinlicker, Rebūke, Michael Bibi, Green Velvet, Dr. Rubinstein, Objekt, 999999999, Amo Amo, Touch Sensitive, Ross From Friends, SG Lewis, Friendly Fires, Polo & Pan, SURVIVE, Hot Chip, Jen Ferrer, Martin Ikin, Lauren Lo Sung, Tiger & Woods, Anna Lunoe, Kyle Watson, Shiba San b2b Walker & Royce, MK, Fisher, JIA, Anastasia Kristensen, Jay Lumen, Julian Jeweil, Artbat, Amelie Lens, Richie Hawtin, Ford, Crooked Colours, Masego, Moon Boots, Kaskade, Kaytranada, Portugal. The Man |
| 2020 | March 7–8 | CRSSD Festival Spring | Waterfront Park, San Diego | Chris Lake, Patrick Topping, 2manydjs b2b Brodinski, Sacha Robotti, Colette, DJ Heather, DJ Holographic, Monki, Never Dull, Dax J, I Hate Models, Pig&Dan, Mark Knight b2b Technasia, Audion, Radio Slave, Lee K, Annika Wolfe, Gesaffelstein, Majid Jordan, Nora En Pure, Télépopmusik, Inner City, Cassian, Pluko, Justin Jay, Prospa, Purple Disco Machine, Archie Hamilton, Steve Darko, Perseus, MYD, Computer Data, Sohmi, Carl Cox, Charlotte de Witte, Hernan Cattaneo b2b Nick Warren, Ben Böhmer, Tsha, Kudeki, Rüfüs Du Sol, 2manydjs, The Rapture, Octave One, Red Axes, Evan Giia, Okay Kaya |
| 2021 | September 25–26 | CRSSD Festival Fall | Waterfront Park, San Diego | Alex Wax, ANNA, Boys Don't Disco, Boys Noize, CamelPhat, Carl Craig, Chris Lorenzo, City Steps, Dennis Ferrer, DJ Sneak, Flying Lotus, Heminguey, Hot Since 82, Jamie Jones, Jia, Joel Corry, John Digweed, Jon Hopkins, Kareem Ali, Kaytranada, Kelly Lee Owens, Kenny Glasgow, Kerri Chandler, Kobosil, Kölsch, Manics, Mason Collective, Mood II Swing, Moodymann, Nasser Baker, Öona Dahl, Park Hye Jin, Paul Kalkbrenner L, Paula Temple, Robert Hood, Sango, Seth Troxler, Shallou, Surf Mesa, Sven Väth, The Midnight, The Palms, Tiga, Todd Terry, Township Rebellion, ZHU |
| 2022 | September 24–25 | CRSSD Festival Fall | Waterfront Park, San Diego | MK, Dom Dolla, Sonny FOdera, AC Slater, Wax Motif, Westend, Biscits, Deeper Purpose, We, Joseph Capriati, VTSS, Marcel Dettmann, Stephan Bodzin, Testpilot, Scuba, Chloé Robinson, Mesmé, Marie Nyx, Moderat, Duck Sauce, Hayden James, Drama, Cannons, l'imperatrice, Kuu, Lewis Ofman, Adam Salter, Fatboy Slim, Artbat, Mochakk, The Avalanches, Romy, I. Jordan, Jaguar, Sarah Story, Tibasko, Richie Hawtin, Reinier Zonneveld, Sven Väth, Franky Wah, Stephan Jolk, Zombies in Miami, Ms. Mada, Ta., Jamie XX, Fred Again.., Caribou, Orbital, Elder Island, Godford, Gabe Vega |
| 2023 | September 23–24 | CRSSD Festival Fall | Waterfront Park, San Diego | Underworld, Röyksopp, The Blaze, Elderbrook, Ladytron, Eliza Rose, LP Giobbi, Emmit Fenn, Winston Surfshirt, Chris Lake b2b Cloonee, Interplanetary Criminal, Chris Stussy, Étienne de Crécy, b3b DJ Falcon b3b Boombass, Todd Terje, Jayda G, Blackchild, salute, Sweet Like Chocolate, Amelie Lens, FJAAK, Farrago, Will Clarke b2b DJ Minx, Objekt b2b Call Super, HAAi, Nikki Nair, Yu Su, Laura Peck |
| 2024 | March 2–3 | CRSSD Festival Spring | Waterfront Park, San Diego | Tale of Us, WhoMadeWho, Red Axes, Kruder & Dorfmeister, Jan Blomqvist, Vandelux, Satin Jackets, Angrybaby, Gabe Vega, Armand Van Helden, Sammy Virji, The Martinez Brothers b2b Green Velvet, Loco Dice b2b Nic Fanciulli, Archie Hamilton, Enzo Siragusa, East End Dubs, Luuk van Dijk, Ahmed Spins, Jax Carter, TRYM, Héctor Oaks b2b Tiga, KiNK b2b Partiboi69, KI/KI, DJ Heartstring, X Club, Sally C, Syreeta, Marie Nyx, Lane 8, SBTRKT, Little Dragon, Disco Lines, Joe Kay b2b Jared Jackson, SANGO, Roosevelt, Saul Q, Mochakk, Dixon, Astra Club, Toman, Beltran, Maz, Sofia Kourtesis, Ky William, Michi, Richie Hawtin, Jeff Mills, Joris Voorn, Le Youth, Simon Doty, Nils Hoffmann, KASIA, Nekter |
| 2024 | September 28 + 29 | CRSSD Festival Fall | Waterfront Park, San Diego | |

== See also ==
- List of music festivals in the United States
- List of electronic music festivals
- Culture of San Diego
