= Karl Strauss =

- Karl Strauss, 1960
- Born: Karl Martin Strauss; October 5, 1912; Minden, Germany
- Died: December 21, 2006 (aged 94); Milwaukee, Wisconsin, U.S.
- Occupation: Master Brewer

Karl Martin Strauss (October 5, 1912 – December 21, 2006) was a German-American brewer. He fled Nazi Germany in 1939, and went on to become a brewer, executive, and consultant in the American brewing industry. He received numerous awards during his career, which spanned both the large national brewery and the microbrew segments of the industry. Karl Strauss Brewing Company, which he helped found in 1989, continues to bear his name.

== Early life ==
He was born October 5, 1912, on the second floor of the administration building of the Feldschlösschen Bräu, a brewery in Minden, Germany, of which his father was president. The second born of two boys and a girl to Albrecht and Mathilde Strauss, he attended the Oberrealschule in Minden where he received his Abitur. During his young life he assisted his father as a brewer and intern while living in the family quarters at the brewery. At age 19, he went to the Technical University of Munich at Weihenstephan, where he received a degree in the science and practice of malting and brewing. In addition, he received Master Brewer certification, allowing him to teach apprentice brewers. With his diploma in hand, he began working at breweries including the Falkenkreuz Brauerei Lippert in Detmold, Westphalia; the Bauer Brauerei in Lübeck, Holstein; and the Altstädter Malzfabrik in Altstadt, Thuringia.

With the rise of the Nazis, Germany was not a safe place for the Jewish Strauss family, and work became scarce. "I graduated from college while Hitler was in power and as a Jew could not find employment in the brewing industry," he wrote in 1943. Thanks to family living in the United States, he was able to secure sponsorship to emigrate. But other members of his family were not so lucky. The last time he saw his mother was the night he left Germany. She later was killed in a concentration camp. His brother was killed in a Nazi raid on the Polish underground.

== Career in America ==
In 1939, Strauss left Germany for the United States, followed soon by his first wife, Irene Vollweiler. He had planned to join family members in San Francisco, California, but stopped in Milwaukee, Wisconsin, at the urging of an uncle to visit family friends. While there he applied for a job with the Pabst Brewing Company, which he intended to be temporary. "I arrived in Milwaukee on St. Patrick's Day, 1939," he later recalled. "I started to work at Pabst on May 11, 1939, and I worked for Pabst for 44 years."

He began his work at Pabst feeding bottles to the bottle soaker. However, "once Pabst realized that it had a Bavarian brew master in its employ, Strauss quickly advanced." Within a few months he was promoted to foreman of filtration. He continued to quickly move up the corporate ladder, becoming an assistant superintendent and later malt house superintendent. In 1942, he was transferred to Pabst's brewery in Peoria, Illinois, as the plant production manager. Within a few years he was made head maltster in Milwaukee and was assistant superintendent of the malt house and brewhouse. In 1948, he was promoted to superintendent of Pabst's newly purchased plant in Los Angeles, and remained there until 1956. He was named technical director of Pabst in 1958, and promoted to vice-president of production in 1960. He helped Pabst reformulate its beer, as well as create a new Pabst Blue Ribbon. He continued as vice-president until retiring from Pabst in 1983.

His first wife died in 1978. He married his second wife, Marjean Schaefer, in 1980.

== Post-retirement ==
In the 1980s, Strauss began a new career as a brewery consultant, providing services for both large breweries and microbreweries throughout the world. He had clients in Europe, Asia, and North America, including Molson, Tsingtao, The Boston Beer Company, and Goose Island Beer Company. He helped design more than 50 brewpubs and microbreweries.

In 1987, a cousin, Chris Cramer, and Cramer's college roommate, Matt Rattner, asked Strauss to help them develop a brewpub in San Diego, California. Strauss not only designed the brewery and trained the brewers; he also formulated the original beer recipes and lent his name to the endeavor. Opening on February 2, 1989, Karl Strauss Brewing Company became the first new brewery in San Diego in more than fifty years and is credited with having launched the craft brewing industry in San Diego. Strauss served as the brewmaster and corporate image of Karl Strauss Brewing Company. As corporate spokesman he made radio commercials in his thick German accent, always concluding "...or my name isn't Karrrrl Strrrrrauss!"; on the technical side he was heavily involved in the design of the company's new properties and brewing of new beers. He remained actively involved with the company until his death in Milwaukee on December 21, 2006, at the age of 94. He is buried at Mount Sinai Memorial Park in Los Angeles.

Strauss co-authored a book, The Practical Brewer, published by the Master Brewers Association of the Americas.

== Legacy ==
Strauss was president of the Master Brewers Association of the Americas from 1961–63. He is the only person to receive all three of the highest awards given by the association: the Award of Merit (1981), given to an individual or individuals who made an outstanding contribution to the brewing industry; the Award of Honor (1992), given to a member who has rendered outstanding service to the association; and the Distinguished Life Service Award (2003), which recognizes MBAA members who have given exceptional service to the association.

Karl was a founder and director of the Museum of Beer and Brewing in Milwaukee. The museum now presents an annual Karl Strauss Award to individuals for lifetime contributions to the industry.

In 2006, Karl Strauss Brewing Company set up the Karl Strauss Brewers Education Fund with the Jewish Community Foundation of San Diego. The fund provides financial educational support to aspiring southern California brewers pursuing a career in the field of brewing.
