= Aztec Brewing Company =

Coordinates: 33°8′58.67″N 117°13′47.35″W

Aztec Brewery
- Formerly: Aztec Brewing Company
- Industry: Alcoholic beverage
- Founded: 1921
- Headquarters: Mexicali and San Diego, United States
- Products: Beer
- Website: www.aztecbrewery.com

Aztec Brewing Company (also known as Aztec Brewery) was a regional brewery founded in Mexicali, Mexico, in 1921, which moved to San Diego, California, in 1933. It closed in 1953, and was revived as a brand in 2011. It is the only brewing company ever to move from Mexico to the United States.

== History ==
=== Baja California ===
In 1921, San Diego businessmen Edward P. Baker and Herbert Jaffe, and brewing engineer William H. Strouse opened Cervecera Azteca, SA, in Mexicali, the capital city of the Mexican state of Baja California, since Prohibition disallowed them to manufacture, sell or transport alcohol in the United States.

The brewery was destroyed by a fire in 1927, but was rebuilt at the same site.

During the 1920s, Aztec competed with Cerveceria Mexicali (Mexicali Brewery) for market share in Baja California, especially in Tijuana where Americans were traveling during Prohibition for legal alcohol consumption.

Aztec’s flagship brew was Famous A.B.C. Beer, a pale lager. The company also brewed a dark beer. A.B.C. Beer won a gold medal at the Exposición Ibero-Americana (Ibero-American Exposition of 1929) in Seville, Spain. This led to the inclusion of the word "Famous" in the name.

Strouse was later chief engineer for the San Diego Brewing Company, and was also instrumental in founding, with Alberto V. Aldrete Sr., the Tecate Brewery in Tecate, Mexico in 1943. Strouse later returned to Aztec Brewery until his death in 1944.

=== Move to San Diego (1933–1947) ===
With the end of Prohibition in 1933, a new brewery was built in San Diego and the entire operation moved to the new location soon afterward. The new brewery was located at 2301 Main St. in the Barrio Logan neighborhood. The building was a former plant for the Savage Tire Company. Approximately $450,000 was spent in purchasing the property and remodeling the building so that it could be converted into a brewery. It had a 100,000 barrel per year capacity and a refrigerated cellar with capacity for 4,000 barrels. It had one of the largest bottling plants of its kind at the time with a system that could wash, rinse, sterilize and fill 100 bottles per minute. Although the main brand, A.B.C., was kept, it was reformulated by then brewmaster A. Bud Daniels. The word “Supreme” was added to the label. Former workers of the company later stated that the reformulation was necessary and that the original beer had a “skunky” flavor. The label continued to refer to the beer as “Famous” even though it was no longer the same recipe that had won the gold medal.

Aztec Brewing grew quickly. Within three months, it went from seventeenth place to third place in sales west of the Rocky Mountains. Aztec began producing beer in cans in 1936. The early conetop cans from the 1930s and 1940s are highly sought after by collectors today, as are other products from the company. Edward Baker also purchased a stake in the Arizona Brewing Company of Phoenix in 1934, but the two companies were never merged.

Aztec quickly had a new rival – San Diego Brewing Company, which had originally opened in 1897, but had closed in 1920 for the duration of Prohibition. It reopened in 1935 and continued until 1942. The brewery should not be confused with the current San Diego Brewing Company brewpub that opened in the 1990s.

Keeping track of the number of beer brands Aztec made is difficult, because with a minimum order of 500 cases, the company would put any label on its bottles for the customer. But some of the surviving examples of labels for the company include A.B.C., A.B.C. Bock, A.B.C. Old Ale, A.B.C. Old Stout, A.B.C. Pale Ale, Associated, Aztec, Black Eagle, Bulldog, Casa Mia, Del Mar Pale Ale, Dutch Lunch, Excel, Great Seal, Majestic, Old Coin, Old Dutch Ale, Red Spot, and Spotlight. A.B.C. Beer’s primary markets were San Diego, Los Angeles, Long Beach, and parts of Arizona. However, the beer was also distributed to New Mexico, Nevada, Oregon and Hawaii as well.

==== Rathskeller ====
Photographs of the 1933 San Diego brewery show a modern facility with a very colorful tasting room, known as the rathskeller. The rathskeller was lavishly decorated and covered in murals painted by renowned Spanish artist Jose Moya del Piño, who also oversaw the decorations in the room. The murals on the wall depict various scenes of Aztecs. Decorations in the rathskeller included, "painted and carved tables and chairs and ceiling beams, chandeliers, tiled mahogany cabinets, stained glass windows and doors, and a 9-foot replica of the Aztec calendar". Coincidentally, among other works by Moya del Piño are murals painted for the Acme Brewing Company of San Francisco in 1935. The Acme Brewing Company building and rathskeller was demolished in 1990, however the Moya del Pino murals were moved and currently live at the Logan Heights Library in San Diego.

=== Sale and closure ===
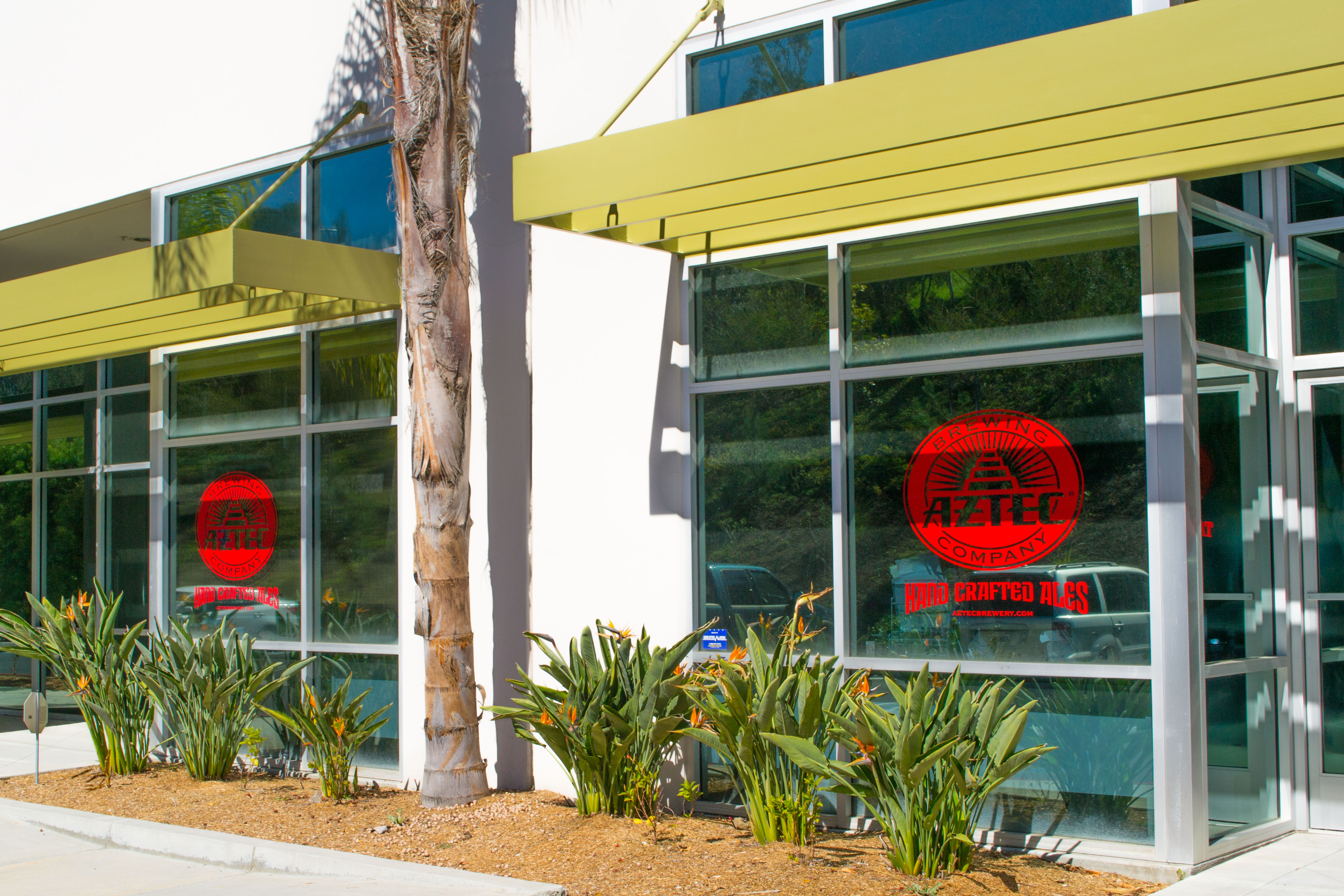
The new Aztec Brewing Company (2013) in Vista, California

In 1948, Aztec was purchased by the Altes Brewing Company of Detroit. Altes had originally been the Tivoli Brewing Company, but was renamed after its most popular beer. Edward P. Baker remained at Altes as a director of the new company. For whatever reason, Altes did not continue brewing the popular ABC Beer. Altes focused on its brands Altes, Altes “Brisk,” Altes Golden Lager and 7-11. Instead, the Famous ABC Beer brand was purchased by the Maier Brewing Company of Los Angeles and brewed there until at least 1957.

Altes was bought by the National Brewing Company of Baltimore, Md., which closed the San Diego brewery in 1953. The building was subsequently used by Rohr Aircraft Corporation and later by Dorman’s Tire Company. The building was torn down by the city of San Diego in 1989 when it was deemed the building was unsafe by earthquake standards. However, the murals and other items from the Rathskeller were deemed by the community as valuable historical items, and the city of San Diego had them removed and stored for future display in a project in the neighborhood.

With the closure of Aztec Brewery, there was no local commercially brewed beer in San Diego County for 34 years, until the Bolt Brewery opened in 1987 in Fallbrook, California.

=== Revival of Aztec Brewing Company ===
In 2008, John Webster discovered the brand and began bringing it back to life with his partner, Claudia Faulk, and son Tristan Faulk-Webster. Webster learned about Aztec Brewing Company while researching old California beer brands for a line of T-shirts he was designing. Recognizing the potential the name and historic brand had in the San Diego area he secured the U. S. trademark rights and with his partner Claudia Faulk, set about reviving the brand as a modern craft brewery. In 2010, they joined forces with Robert Esposito. A year later they opened a small production brewery with tap room in Vista, California.

The revival of Aztec Brewing Company opened on August 29, 2011 in the Vista Business Park. Vista is home to twelve craft breweries, including Mother Earth Brew Co., Iron Fist Brewing Co., Toolbox Brewing, Booze Brothers Brewing Co., and Latitude 33 Brewing Co. The company operates a tasting room at its brewery. In 2012, Paul Naylor came on board as brewer. Robert Esposito left the company in 2014.
