= Karl Strauss Brewing Company =

Craft brewery in San Diego, California

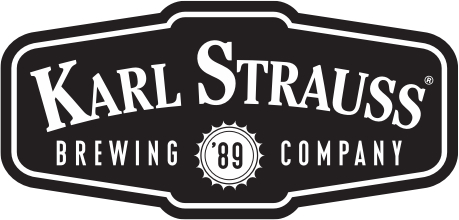
- Industry: Alcoholic beverage
- Founded: 1989
- Founder: Chris Cramer and Matt Rattner
- Headquarters: San Diego, California, U.S.
- Products: Beer
- Website: www.karlstrauss.com

Karl Strauss Brewing Company is a San Diego, California–based craft brewery with nine brewpub locations across Southern California and a main brewery in the Pacific Beach neighborhood of San Diego. Besides being available at its own brewpubs, the company's beers are distributed across all of California. Karl Strauss is the oldest surviving brewery in San Diego County, having been founded in 1989, and is credited with launching the county's rise to prominence in the craft brewing industry. Based on 2016 sales volume it is the 47th largest brewery in the United States. In summer 2017 Karl Strauss was declared the Mid-Size Brewery of the Year at the Great American Beer Festival.

== History ==
In 1988, Chris Cramer and Matt Rattner asked Cramer's cousin, Master Brewer Karl Strauss, to help them develop a brewpub. Strauss was a former vice president of production at Pabst Brewing Company. Strauss agreed, contributing his library of hundreds of beer recipes, helping to design brewing operations, and serving as the company's spokesman on radio advertisements and in public appearances until his death in 2006.

The company's first brewpub, Karl Strauss Old Columbia Brewery and Grille, located on Columbia Street in downtown San Diego, opened in 1989. It was the first brewery of any type to operate in San Diego since 1953, and the first-ever brewpub in San Diego. At the time the craft brewing industry was in its infancy and the American standard for beer was light, mild and mass-produced, but Cramer felt that the country was ready for beers with more personality. He believed that "If we could get this style of beer into people's mouths, we could create converts."

The company's first distributing brewery began producing beer in late 1991. In 1996 the company's distributing brewery operations were moved into a 22,000-square-foot (2,000 m^{2}) home office and brewing building in Pacific Beach. Also in 1991 the company opened its second brewpub: Karl Strauss Brewery Gardens in Sorrento Mesa. Additional brewpubs were opened in La Jolla (1996) (location closed as of January, 2021), Carlsbad (1999), Costa Mesa (2002), 4S Ranch in San Diego's North County (2012), Temecula (2013), Anaheim (2016) and downtown Los Angeles (2016). There was previously a Karl Strauss brewpub at Universal CityWalk in Los Angeles which closed sometime after 2020 and was replaced with a Starbucks. In 2023 a new Karl Strauss beer location opened called Port of San Fransokyo Cervecería at the Disney California Adventure theme park in Anaheim.

In 2009, the company partnered with the Greenhouse alternative energy company in a program to convert its waste to ethanol for use as a fuel.

As of 2023 the brewery has nine locations in Southern California, including five in San Diego County. In November 2023 the company opened its first outdoor beer garden, the Karl Strauss Outpost San Marcos.

== See also ==
- Beer in San Diego County, California
