= The Bigfellas =

American band

Background information
- Origin: San Diego, California, United States
- Genres: Indie pop, rock, comedy rock
- Years active: 2004–present
- Members: Shay Bell, Charlie Recksieck
- Website: https://www.bigfellas.net

The Bigfellas is an indie rock band from San Diego, California. They're known for humorous songs such as "On The Green" (a rap song about golf) and somewhat controversial "I Wish That I Were Gay" in addition to tuneful "California King" and "Wish You Knew". The band often cooks grilled cheese sandwiches or hot dogs onstage for the audience during shows.

Their music provides the theme song for two successful podcasts: "On The Green" is the music for The Super 70s Sports Podcast while "California King" opens the Silicon Valley focused podcast Something Ventured.

Drummer Shay Bell and keyboardist/singer Charlie Recksieck have been with the band for its duration.

Charlie also writes, records and performs with singer/songwriter Spud Davenport in side band, Leaders In The Clubhouse. They released their rock satire debut album, Won in 2015.

== Film and TV ==
They appear in and have their music featured in the 2012 documentary Don't Change The Subject, and the movie's score was composed by Recksieck. The Bigfellas music also appears in the 2012 documentary Suds County, USA. Charlie Recksieck also provided some musical cues for the Bravo tv series, LOLwork.

== Discography ==
Albums:

- Clap! - (2003)
- Chubbed Up - (2008)
- I Wish That I Were Gay [EP] - (2009)
- Don't Change The Subject Soundtrack - (2012)
- Hiya (Chuck Charles) - (2020)
