= Pizza Port =

American brewpub

Pizza Port Brewing Company
- Location: Southern California
- Opened: March 1987
- Owned by: Vince and Gina Marsaglia

Active beers
Name	Type
Revelations	Belgian-Style Pale Strong Ale
Pier Rat Porter	Robust Porter
Reed's Wee Heavy	Scotch Ale
Port Truck Stout	Classic Irish-Style Dry Stout
Shark Attack	Imperial Red Ale
Sticky Stout	American-Style Stout

Pizza Port Brewing Company is a brewpub with eight locations in Southern California. A former Pizza Port location in San Marcos spun out of Pizza Port in 2006 and is now an independent operation, the Port Brewing Company / Lost Abbey brewery.

== History ==
Pizza Port was established in March 1987 when it made pizza only in Solana Beach. They installed a seven-barrel brewery and served their first handcrafted beer brewed on the premises in October 1992, becoming part of the "second wave" of craft breweries that led San Diego County to prominence in the craft brewing industry. Even before that, the restaurant's guest taps featuring local home-brewed beer were "hugely influential" in the development of San Diego's brewing culture.

== Awards ==
The Solana Beach location was named Small Brewpub of the Year in both 2003 and 2004 by the Great American Beer Festival. In 2006, it was named one of the "Top 50 Places to Have a Beer in America" by beeradvocate.com. They have won over 100 GABF medals in total, and most of any craft brewery in History. The brews have won several prizes at the World Beer Cup, including 5 gold medals. In 2010, the Pizza Port family of breweries won 6 awards for its beers at the World Beer Cup, and in 2012 they won 5 more. In 2009, 2010 and 2011, Pizza Port Carlsbad was named Large Brewpub of the Year at the Great American Beer Festival.

At the 2024 World Beer Cup, two of its beers won gold medals:

- Junk In Da Trunkel Dunkel (Pizza Port Ocean Beach) – Gold in the South German-Style Dunkel Weizen category.
- 24th Annual Strong Ale Festival Blend (Pizza Port Carlsbad) – Gold in the Wood- and Barrel-Aged Beer category.

== Gallery ==
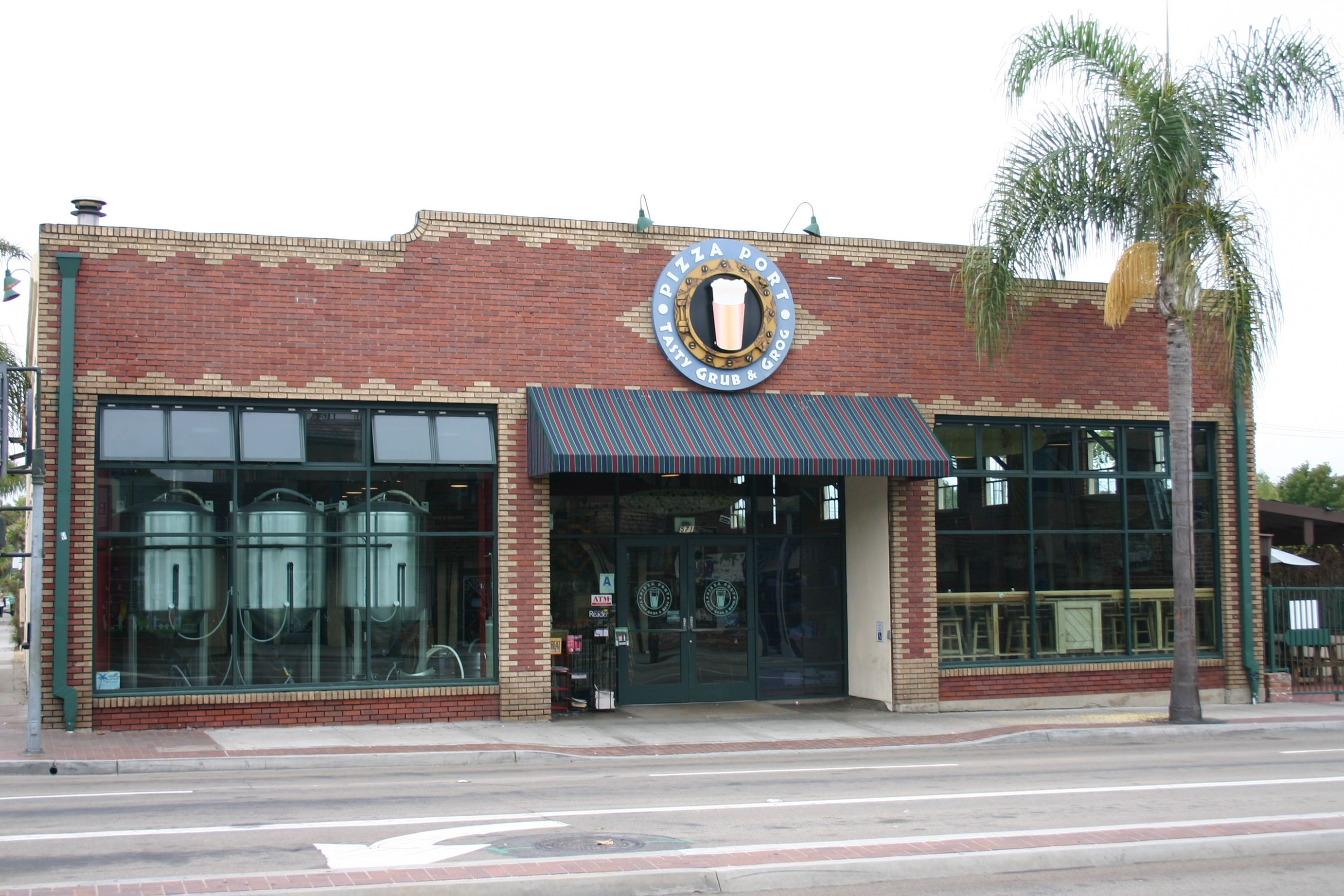
Restaurant in Carlsbad.

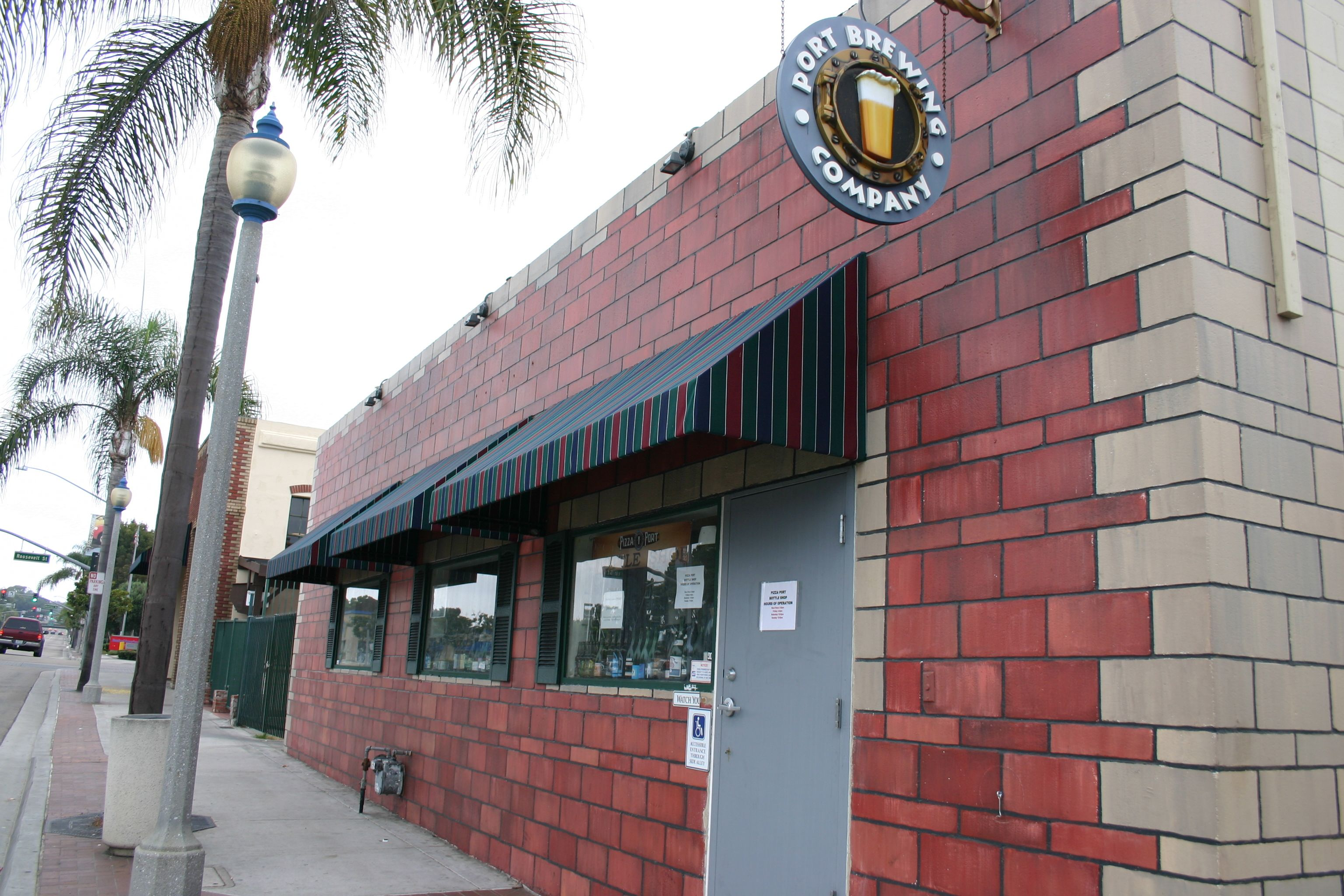
Bottle shop in Carlsbad.

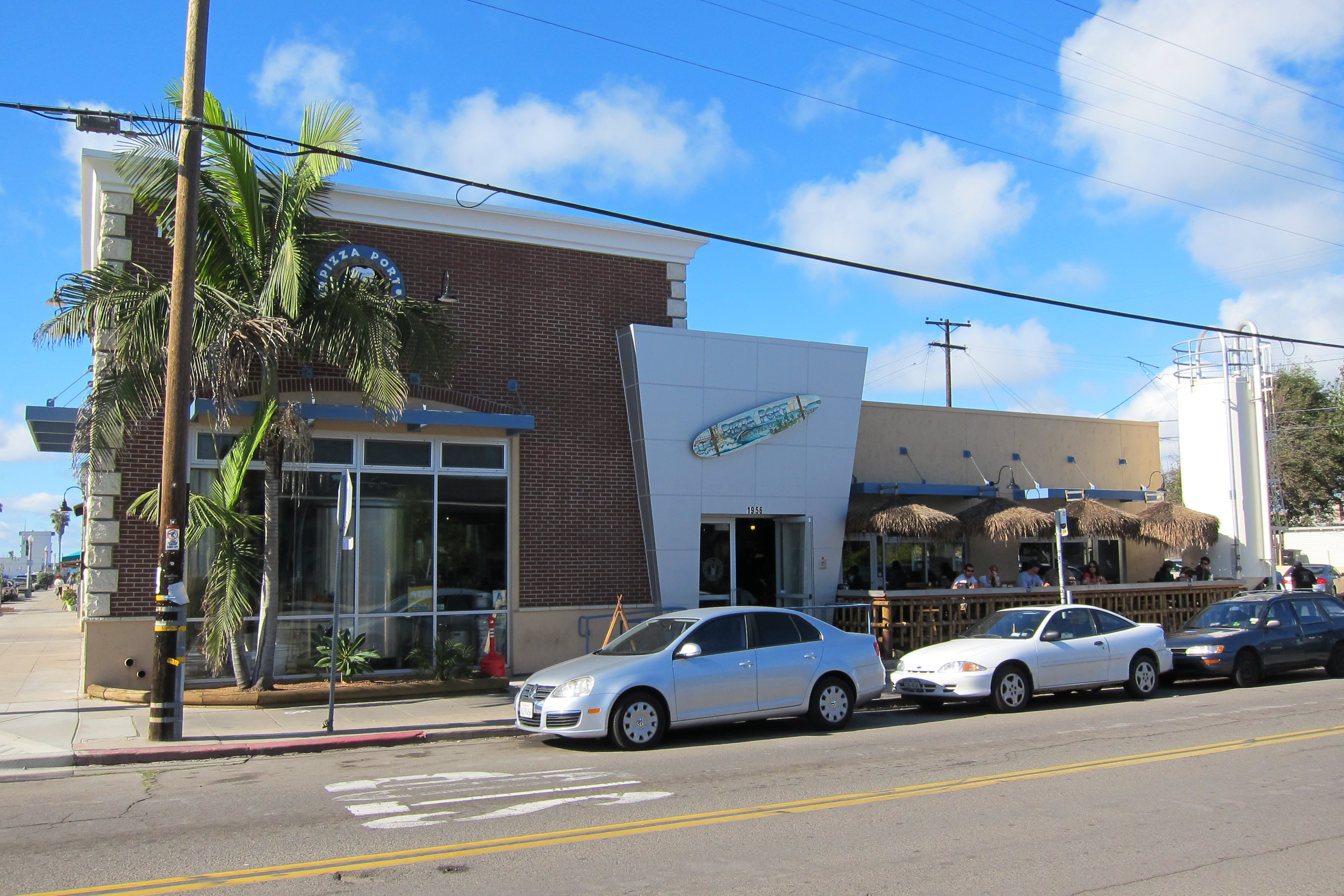
The Ocean Beach location opened in 2010

== See also ==
- California breweries
