= Stone Brewing Co. =

Brewery formerly headquartered in Escondido, California, USA

Coordinates: 33.1157°N 117.1199°W

Stone Brewing
- Location: Paso Robles, California
- Opened: 1996; 30 years ago
- Key people: Maria Stipp (chief executive officer); Greg Koch (executive chairman); Steve Wagner (president)
- Annual production volume: 325,645 US beer barrels (382,137 hL) (2015)
- Employees: 1,100
- Parent: Duvel Moortgat Brewery
- Website: stonebrewing.com

Stone Brewing (formerly Stone Brewing Co.) is a brewery formerly headquartered in Escondido, California, United States. Founded in 1996 in San Marcos, it is the largest brewery in Southern California. Based on 2020 sales volume, it is the ninth largest craft brewery in the United States.

The brewery's first beer was Stone Pale Ale, which was considered to be its flagship ale until it was retired in 2015. The company's best known brand is Arrogant Bastard Ale, which has been described as a "watershed beer" that "put San Diego on the craft brew map." Most of Stone's beers are characteristic of west-coast craft beer, meaning that they have a high hop content, and an average alcohol strength between 6% and 10%.

Stone Brewing has been rated as a "world class brewery" by two beer enthusiast websites, RateBeer and BeerAdvocate. Stone Brewing has been voted by the readers of Beer Advocate as the #1 "All Time Top Brewery on Planet Earth."

In August 2022, Sapporo Breweries bought Stone for $165 million, with the Stone brewery taking on production of Sapporo beers in California for distribution across North America.

Stone Brewing is owned by Duvel Moortgat USA and managed alongside Firestone Walker Brewing Company. The brand was acquired from Japanese brewing giant Sapporo USA in a 2026 joint transition, shifting its operational and West Coast home base to Firestone Walker in Paso Robles, California.

== History ==
Stone opened in San Marcos in 1996 at the location currently home to Port Brewing Company and The Lost Abbey. Local designer/illustrator Thomas K. Matthews created the original gargoyle in 1996. He also drew the Arrogant Bastard Ale, Stone Ruination IPA, and Stone Levitation Ale gargoyles, as well as barley and hops motifs.

Since 1999, the company has also operated its own distribution arm called Stone Distributing Company which services Southern California and represents more than 40 craft beer, cider and kombucha brands.

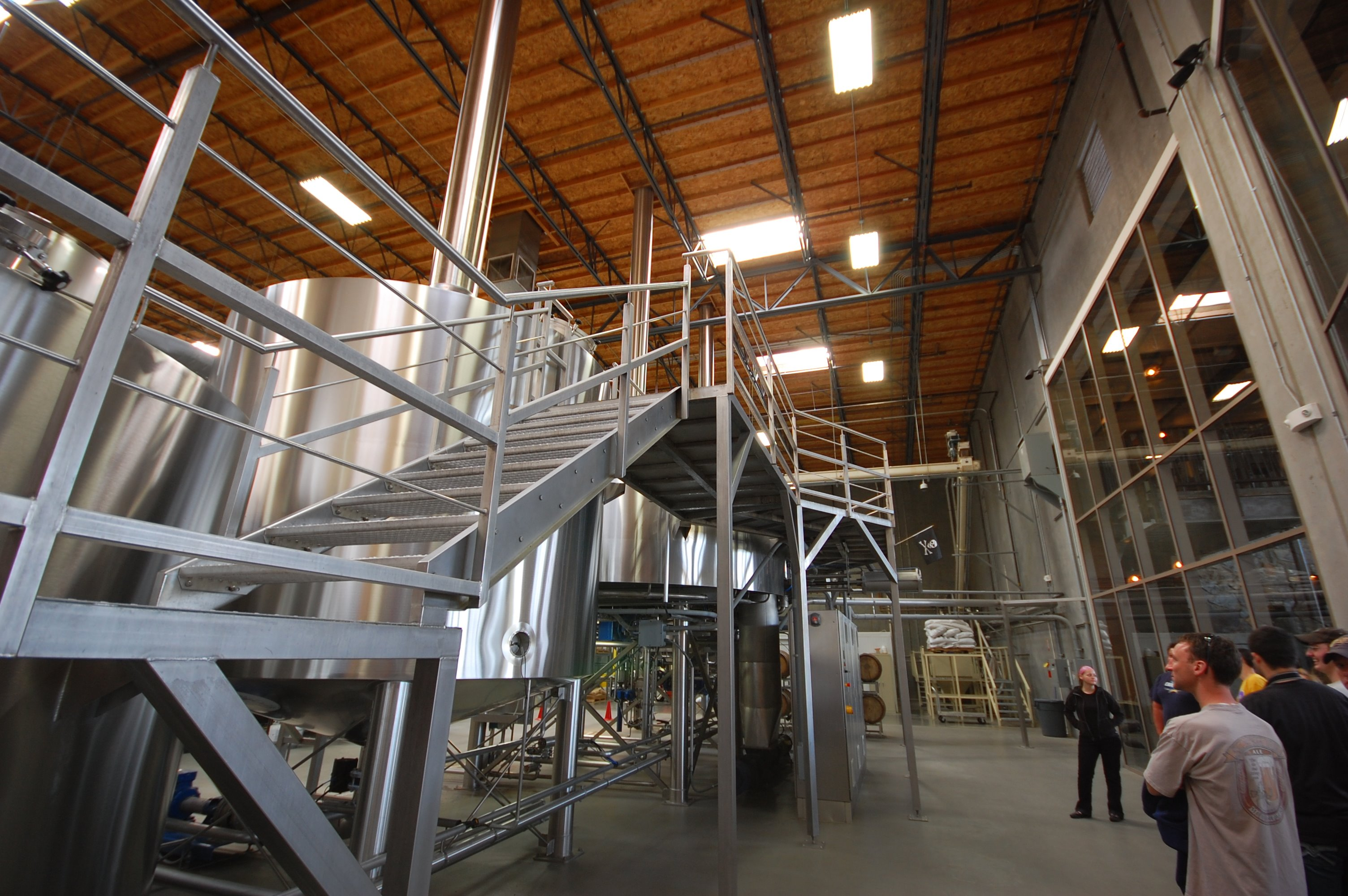
A tour of the Escondido, California location in 2009

In 2006, Stone relocated from the original brewery to a new, custom-designed facility in Escondido. In 2013, the company opened a packaging hall just south of the brewery which houses the bottling and keg lines. The brewery in Escondido produced 325,645 US beer barrels in 2015. The site is also home to a restaurant, Stone Brewing World Bistro & Gardens - Escondido, an 8,500-square-foot (790 m^{2}) restaurant with a large outdoor patio and 1 acre (4,000 m^{2}) of gardens. The brewery also houses a Stone Company Store which sells Stone merchandise as well as 1- and 2-liter growlers and 40-ounce and can that can be filled with Stone's year-round beers and special releases.

In May 2013 a second Stone Brewing World Bistro and Gardens opened in the Liberty Station development in the Point Loma neighborhood of San Diego. The 23,500-square-foot (2,180 m^{2}) facility cost $8 million and can seat 700 patrons. It is housed in the former mess hall and several other historic buildings of the former Naval Training Center San Diego.

In addition to the locations at Escondido and Liberty Station, there are Stone Company Stores in Oceanside, Pasadena, and in San Diego's Little Italy community. The stores sell beer in bottles, kegs and growlers.

In June 2008, Stone Brewing covered the roof of the brewery with solar panels, cutting their energy costs nearly in half. The 1,561 roof-mounted solar modules will offset more than 538,000 pounds (244,000 kg) of carbon emissions over its lifetime, which is equivalent to planting 204 acres (0.83 km^{2}) of trees.

In Summer 2014, the company announced plans to open Stone Brewing Berlin in the German capital. A 100 hectoliter brewery with onsite can filling in Mariendorf, Berlin went into operation in June 2016. At that time, Stone Berlin began distributing Stone IPA and Arrogant Bastard Ale to Austria, the Baltics, Denmark, Finland, France, Ireland, Italy, Netherlands, Northern Ireland, Poland, Spain, Sweden, Switzerland, and the United Kingdom. In 2016 a corner of Stone Brewing Berlin opened as a full restaurant and gardens, Stone Brewing World Bistro & Gardens - Berlin. In April 2019 the entire Stone Brewing - Berlin operation was sold to Scotland-based BrewDog.

On October 8, 2014, sources indicated Stone Brewing had chosen Richmond, Virginia, as the site for its first brewery in the eastern United States. The other two finalists for the brewery were Columbus, Ohio, and Norfolk, Virginia. Virginia Governor Terry McAuliffe made the formal announcement about the new brewery on October 9, 2014. The brewery held the opening of the Stone Company Store Richmond in March 2016 and began brewing, kegging and bottling Stone IPA in July 2016.

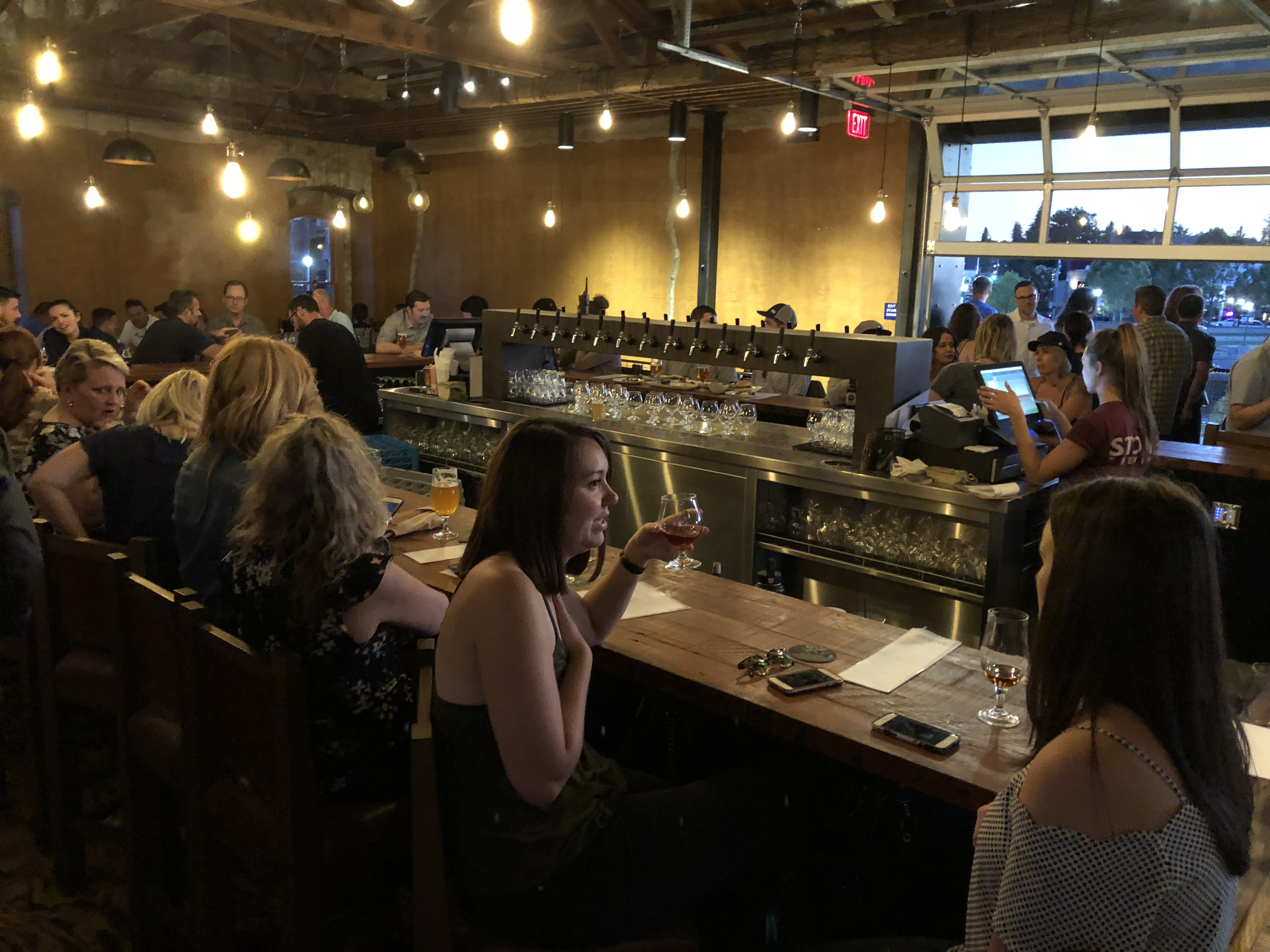
The second story bar at Stone Brewing Company in Napa, California

In May 2016, the company announced plans to open a tap room and 10-barrel brewing system in Napa, California. The facility is housed in the historic Borrero building in downtown Napa and opened in May 2018.

On February 12, 2018, Stone filed a lawsuit against MillerCoors, the makers of Keystone beer, alleging that they were attempting to co-opt their name after a brand revamp that emphasizes the word "Stone" on the sides of their products.

In June 2022, Stone and Sapporo Breweries announced that they had reached an agreement for Sapporo to purchase Stone Brewing for $168 million, with the purchase expected to close in August 2022. The sale did not include Stone Distributing, which is set to become its own independent company.

On January 30, 2025, Sapporo Breweries announced a $91 million impairment charge on the goodwill of their acquisition of Stone Brewing.

== Awards ==
Stone has won several awards at major international beer competitions.

Name	Style	Honors
Double Bastard Ale	Strong Ale	2005 Great American Beer Festival Silver
Levitation Ale	Amber Ale	2007 Great American Beer Festival Gold
Old Guardian	Barley wine	2000 Great American Beer Festival Silver
Pale Ale	ESB	2008 World Beer Cup Bronze, 2006 Great American Beer Festival Bronze
Ruination	India Pale Ale	2006 World Beer Cup Bronze
Smoked Porter With Chipotle	Chili-spiced beer	2010 Great American Beer Festival Silver
Sublimely Self-Righteous Ale	Black India Pale Ale	2010 Great American Beer Festival Bronze
Imperial Russian Stout	Imperial Stout	2014 U.S. Open Beer Championship Gold
Go To IPA	Session Beer	2014 U.S. Open Beer Championship Gold
Witty Moron	Other Belgian Style Ale	2014 and 2017 Great American Beer Festival Gold
Delicious IPA	Near Gluten Free	2016 U.S. Open Beer Championship Gold
Tropic of Thunder	India Pale Lager	2019 U.S. Open Beer Championship Bronze
Stone IPA	West Coast IPA	2021 U.S. Open Beer Championship Gold

== See also ==
- Beer in San Diego County, California
- Beer in the United States
