= Erika Davies =

American singer-songwriter

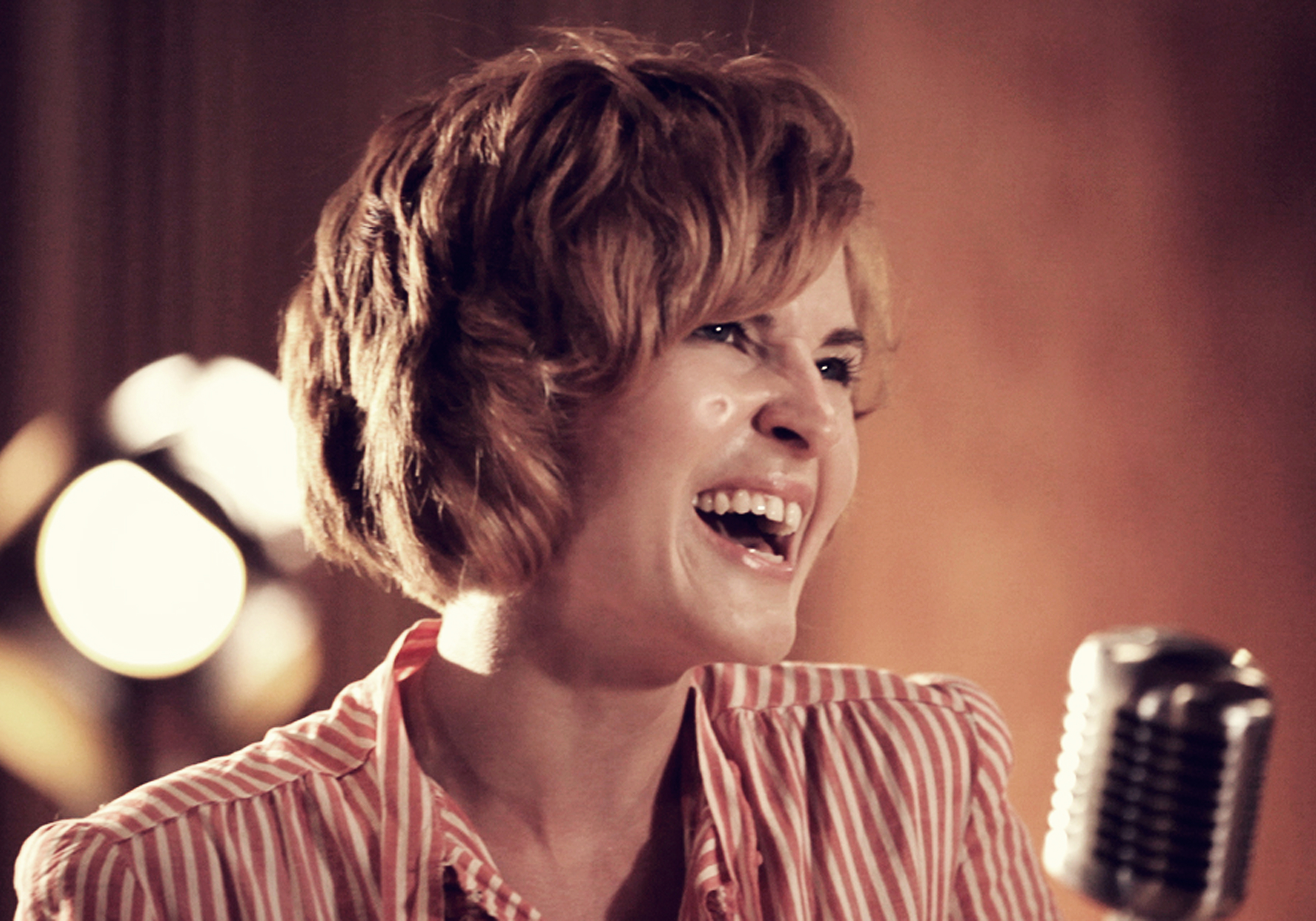
- Davies in 2011

Background information
- Birth name: Erika Lyn Tryon
- Also known as: Miss Erika Davies
- Born: January 20, 1981 (age 44); Mesa, Arizona
- Origin: San Diego
- Genres: Lounge music, jazz-folk retro, country
- Occupation(s): Singer-songwriter, musician
- Instrument(s): Vocals, ukulele
- Years active: 2004–present
- Labels: indie

Erika Davies, also professionally credited as Miss Erika Davies (born January 20, 1981), is an American jazz vocalist. A San Diego–based performer and singer-songwriter, Davies resides in California and gigs regularly.

== Vocal stylings ==
Davies sings in a retro, jazz, folk and lounge style. She is best known for her vocals on "I Love You, I Do", which was used in a US-wide car commercial by Subaru.

Davies has performed since 2004 mainly in the San Diego area and has released five albums.

== Acting ==
In 2016, Erika Davies starred in her first film, Cavern, titled after her ukulele song of the same name. The film was accepted into Cannes Film Festival Court Métrage.

== Awards and nominations ==
- "Galaxy Lakes" nominated "Best Jazz Album" at the 2011 San Diego Music Awards.
- Won "Best Jazz Artist" 2012 San Diego Music Awards.
- "Part The Sea" nominated "Best Jazz Album", 2013 San Diego Music Awards.
- "In Love With Someone" nominated "Best Jazz Album", 2015 San Diego Music Awards.
- Nominated "Best Jazz" Artist, 2019 San Diego Music Awards

== Other activities ==
Apart from her career as a performer and musician, Davies is a fashion designer of handmade clothing, marketed under the label "Spicy Toast".

== Discography ==
- Creecho Habecktoe, Old Ditties and New (2008)
- Galaxy Lakes (2011)
- Part The Sea (2013)
- In Love With Someone (2015)
- I Am Love (2017)
- “Supernatural” (2021)
- “Give Your Heart A Whirl” (2023)
