= Mission Brewery Plaza =

- U.S. National Register of Historic Places

- Location within San Diego Location within San Diego County, California Location within California Location within the United States
- Location: 1715 Hancock St., San Diego, California
- Coordinates: 32°44′30″N 117°10′59″W
- Area: 0.4 acres (0.16 ha)
- Built: 1912–13
- Architect: Greisser, Richard
- Architectural style: Mission Revival
- NRHP reference No.: 89000805
- Added to NRHP: July 6, 1989

Mission Brewery Plaza is a historic brewery building in the Middletown neighborhood of San Diego, California. The building was added to the National Register of Historic Places on July 6, 1989. It is also the name of a San Diego microbrewery which opened in 2007 and operates in a different neighborhood in San Diego.

== Historic building ==
Built from 1912 to 1913, the brewery was the first in the U.S. to be designed in the Mission Revival style; it is still the only Mission Revival industrial building in San Diego. The brewery was operated by the San Diego Consolidated Brewing Company, a group led by August F. Lang. Due to the impending threat of prohibition on the brewing industry, the brewery began production of a non-alcoholic drink called Hopski in 1915; however, the drink sold poorly and was discontinued, and the brewery closed in 1918.

The building served as an isolation hospital during the 1918 flu pandemic; the physician in charge of the hospital, Dr. Peter C. Remondino, claimed to have never lost a patient to the flu. The American Agar Company purchased the building in 1923 and converted it into San Diego's first agar production plant. While the American Agar Company folded in 1933 due to Japanese competition, the building became an agar plant again after Japanese imports ceased during World War II. The American Agar and Chemical Company produced agar in the building from the 1940s until 1987.

In 1987, developer Mike Foote bought the property, restored it, and converted it into offices. He hoped to open a microbrewery and restaurant at the site but lost the property to foreclosure in 1992. Pacifica Company bought it and continues to operate it as an office building. Pacifica later developed an adjacent residential complex called the Mission Apartments.

In 2013, a new craft brewery called Acoustic Ales Brewing Experiment opened in the reconditioned old brewery space, but has since closed. In April 2018, Latchkey Brewing opened in the same location, but closed their brewery in 2021. Both breweries cited moving to a larger location in Carlsbad as the reason for closing, but neither has resurfaced as of April 2023.

== Craft brewery ==
In 2007, the name was revived when a new Mission Brewery craft brewery opened in East Village, San Diego. It is housed at 1441 L Street in the historic Wonder Bread building, built in 1894. The former commercial bakery is now a 14,000 square feet (1,300 m^{2}) brewery with an initial capacity of 10,000 barrels a year and a tasting room that could accommodate up to 400 people. The brewery produces hefeweizen, IPA, blonde ale and amber styles, as well as extreme beers like Shipwrecked Double IPA, Carrack Imperial Red, Dark Seas Imperial Stout, and El Conquistador. As a result of the Covid-19 pandemic, Mission Brewery converted their main tasting room into additional brewing capacity for contract brewing and converted a back area of the lot into a new tasting room, moving the building entrance from L Street to 14th Street. Mission Brewery has one additional tasting room located in the Kensington neighborhood of San Diego, having taken it over from Kensington Brewing Company whose owners left the brewing industry.
