= TBC =

TBC may refer to:

== Education ==
- Trinity Bible College in North Dakota, US
- Tauranga Boys' College, a state secondary school in Tauranga, New Zealand

== Companies ==
- Triangle Brewing Company of Durham, North Carolina, US
- Tram et Bus de la CUB (TBC), now Transports Bordeaux Métropole, the operator of three tram lines and a bus network in Bordeaux, France
- TBC Bank, a private bank in Republic of Georgia
- TBC Corporation, parent company of National Tire and Battery and other tire retailers and distributors
- The Beistle Company of Shippensburg, Pennsylvania, US
- The Boiling Crab, a Cajun restaurant chain
- The Boring Company of Elon Musk, in California, US

== Medicine ==
- Tuberculosis, lethal, infectious disease common before World War II

== Radio and television ==
- Tanzania Broadcasting Corporation, official Tanzanian broadcaster known as TBC
  - TBC 1, a Tanzanian television channel
- Taegu Broadcasting Corporation, a South Korean local broadcasting company
- Tohoku Broadcasting Company, a Sendai, Japan, TV/radio station
- Tonga Broadcasting Commission
- Tongyang Broadcasting Company, 1964–1980, a defunct South Korean broadcasting company
- Triad Broadcasting Company

== Music ==
- The Black Crowes, a blues based rock band
- TBC (band), a Christian band
- Texas Boys Choir, a boychoir located in Fort Worth, Texas, US

== Other uses ==
- To be confirmed
- To be continued
- 4-tert-Butylcatechol, an antioxidant
- The Beijing Center for Chinese Studies, organization aiming at educating the academic community about China
- The Battle Cats, a tower defense mobile game on IOS and Android
- World of Warcraft: The Burning Crusade, the first expansion pack for World of Warcraft
- Thermal barrier coating, advanced materials systems usually applied to metallic surfaces operating at elevated temperatures, as a form of exhaust heat management
- Time base corrector, technique to reduce or eliminate errors caused by mechanical instability present in analog recordings
- Transcending Boundaries Conference, north-east US LGBTQI convention
- Treasury Board of Canada
- Tuba City Airport, Arizona IATA airport code
- Tucson Bird Count, a community-based biological monitoring program in Tucson, Arizona, US
- The Brothers Chaps, American writers, voice actors, directors, producers and composers
- True Blue Crew, Australian far-right white supremacist group
- TBC domain, a protein domain named for its initial discovery in the proteins Tre-2, Bub2, and Cdc16
