= Henry Klindt House =

Historic house in Iowa, United States

- U.S. National Register of Historic Places
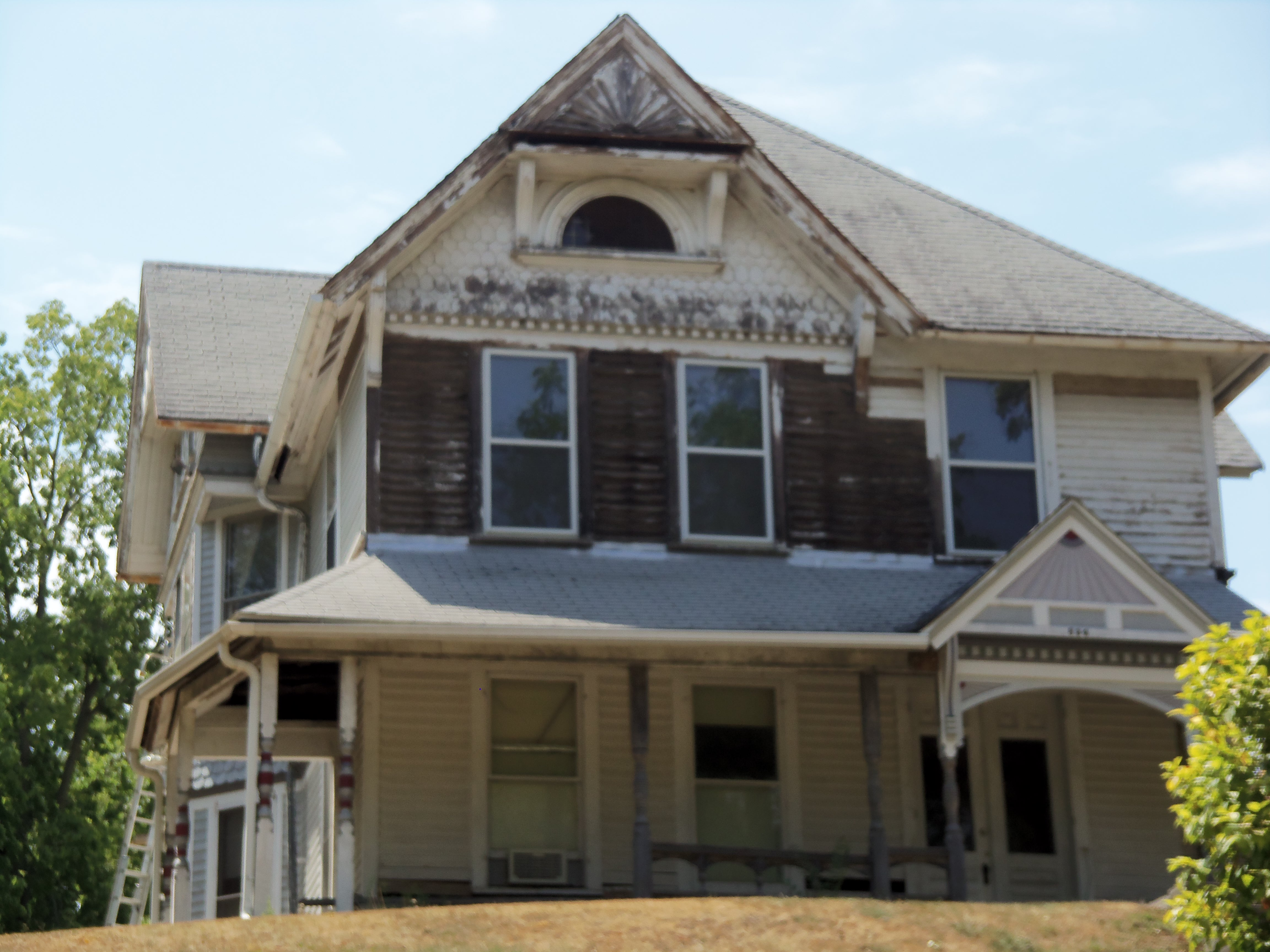

- Location within Iowa Location within the United States
- Location: 834 Marquette St. Davenport, Iowa
- Coordinates: 41°31′43″N 90°35′28″W
- Built: 1890
- Architectural style: Queen Anne
- MPS: Davenport MRA
- NRHP reference No.: 84001454
- Added to NRHP: July 27, 1984

The Henry Klindt House is a historic building located in the West End of Davenport, Iowa, United States. It has been listed on the National Register of Historic Places since 1984.

== Henry Klindt ==
Henry Klindt was born in 1839 in Fiefbergen, Holstein, in present-day Germany, to Thies and Wiepke (Mundt) Klindt. He came to the United States in 1856 and settled on a farm in Scott County, Iowa. He fought for the Union in the Civil War. After the war he opened a feed and grain store in Davenport before he took over the operations of the Eagle Brewery. He sold his interest in the brewery in 1891 to his son George, and became president of the Malt and Grain Company. Klindt married Catherina Schnoor in 1863 and they had one son.

== History ==
Henry Klindt built this house in 1890. It was one of three houses built on Marquette Street for the partners of the brewery. George Mengel's house was at 826 and the George Klindt House, his son's house, at 902.

== Architecture ==
This 2½-story, clapboard house was designed in the Queen Anne style. It features a hip roof, full height gable projections, a polygonal bay on the south side, and a porch on the east and south sides. The gable ends have a sunburst motif and dental moldings on the front and above the main entrance. Shingling is located between the floors of the polygonal bay and on the front gable. The porch features an Eastlake balustrade. The house is situated on a high hill above the street with large trees in the yard.
