= List of United States Supreme Court cases, volume 179 =

Supreme Court of the United States
- Interactive map of Supreme Court of the United States
- 38°53′26″N 77°00′16″W
- Established: March 4, 1789; 236 years ago
- Location: Washington, D.C.
- Coordinates: 38°53′26″N 77°00′16″W
- Composition method: Presidential nomination with Senate confirmation
- Authorised by: Constitution of the United States, Art. III, § 1
- Judge term length: life tenure, subject to impeachment and removal
- Number of positions: 9 (by statute)
- Website: supremecourt.gov

This is a list of cases reported in volume 179 of United States Reports, decided by the Supreme Court of the United States in 1900 and 1901.

== Justices of the Supreme Court at the time of volume 179 U.S. ==
The Supreme Court is established by Article III, Section 1 of the Constitution of the United States, which says: "The judicial Power of the United States, shall be vested in one supreme Court . . .". The size of the Court is not specified; the Constitution leaves it to Congress to set the number of justices. Under the Judiciary Act of 1789 Congress originally fixed the number of justices at six (one chief justice and five associate justices). Since 1789 Congress has varied the size of the Court from six to seven, nine, ten, and back to nine justices (always including one chief justice).

When the cases in volume 179 were decided the Court comprised the following nine members:

Portrait	Justice	Office	Home State	Succeeded	Date confirmed by the Senate (Vote)	Tenure on Supreme Court
	Melville Fuller	Chief Justice	Illinois	Morrison Waite	July 20, 1888 (41–20)	October 8, 1888 – July 4, 1910 (Died)
	John Marshall Harlan	Associate Justice	Kentucky	David Davis	November 29, 1877 (Acclamation)	December 10, 1877 – October 14, 1911 (Died)
	Horace Gray	Associate Justice	Massachusetts	Nathan Clifford	December 20, 1881 (51–5)	January 9, 1882 – September 15, 1902 (Died)
	David Josiah Brewer	Associate Justice	Kansas	Stanley Matthews	December 18, 1889 (53–11)	January 6, 1890 – March 28, 1910 (Died)
	Henry Billings Brown	Associate Justice	Michigan	Samuel Freeman Miller	December 29, 1890 (Acclamation)	January 5, 1891 – May 28, 1906 (Retired)
	George Shiras Jr.	Associate Justice	Pennsylvania	Joseph P. Bradley	July 26, 1892 (Acclamation)	October 10, 1892 – February 23, 1903 (Retired)
	Edward Douglass White	Associate Justice	Louisiana	Samuel Blatchford	February 19, 1894 (Acclamation)	March 12, 1894 – December 18, 1910 (Continued as chief justice)
	Rufus W. Peckham	Associate Justice	New York	Howell Edmunds Jackson	December 9, 1895 (Acclamation)	January 6, 1896 – October 24, 1909 (Died)
	Joseph McKenna	Associate Justice	California	Stephen Johnson Field	January 21, 1898 (Acclamation)	January 26, 1898 – January 5, 1925 (Retired)

== Citation style ==
Under the Judiciary Act of 1789 the federal court structure at the time comprised District Courts, which had general trial jurisdiction; Circuit Courts, which had mixed trial and appellate (from the US District Courts) jurisdiction; and the United States Supreme Court, which had appellate jurisdiction over the federal District and Circuit courts—and for certain issues over state courts. The Supreme Court also had limited original jurisdiction (i.e., in which cases could be filed directly with the Supreme Court without first having been heard by a lower federal or state court). There were one or more federal District Courts and/or Circuit Courts in each state, territory, or other geographical region.

The Judiciary Act of 1891 created the United States Courts of Appeals and reassigned the jurisdiction of most routine appeals from the district and circuit courts to these appellate courts. The Act created nine new courts that were originally known as the "United States Circuit Courts of Appeals." The new courts had jurisdiction over most appeals of lower court decisions. The Supreme Court could review either legal issues that a court of appeals certified or decisions of court of appeals by writ of certiorari.

Bluebook citation style is used for case names, citations, and jurisdictions.

- "# Cir." = United States Court of Appeals
  - e.g., "3d Cir." = United States Court of Appeals for the Third Circuit
- "C.C.D." = United States Circuit Court for the District of . . .
  - e.g.,"C.C.D.N.J." = United States Circuit Court for the District of New Jersey
- "D." = United States District Court for the District of . . .
  - e.g.,"D. Mass." = United States District Court for the District of Massachusetts
- "E." = Eastern; "M." = Middle; "N." = Northern; "S." = Southern; "W." = Western
  - e.g.,"C.C.S.D.N.Y." = United States Circuit Court for the Southern District of New York
  - e.g.,"M.D. Ala." = United States District Court for the Middle District of Alabama
- "Ct. Cl." = United States Court of Claims
- The abbreviation of a state's name alone indicates the highest appellate court in that state's judiciary at the time.
  - e.g.,"Pa." = Supreme Court of Pennsylvania
  - e.g.,"Me." = Supreme Judicial Court of Maine

== List of cases in volume 179 U.S. ==
Case Name	Page & year	Opinion of the Court	Concurring opinion(s)	Dissenting opinion(s)	Lower Court	Disposition
Washburn Moen Manufacturing Company v. Reliance Marine Insurance Company	1 (1900)	Fuller	none	none	1st Cir.	affirmed
Saxlehner v. Eisner & Mendelson Co.	19 (1900)	Brown	none	none	2d Cir.	reversed
The abandonment defense requires evidence of both practical abandonment and intent to abandon; laches defeats a trademark owner's rights when he knew or should have known that others were using the mark, and failed to take action such that the name became generic to the whole class of products; trade dress that would mislead the casual customer constitutes infringement, and is not cured by uses of additional labels.
Saxlehner v. Siegel C. Company	42 (1900)	Brown	none	none	2d Cir.	reversed
Saxlehner v. Nielsen	43 (1900)	Brown	none	none	2d Cir.	reversed
Looker v. Maynard	46 (1900)	Gray	none	none	Mich.	affirmed
Oregon Railroad and Navigation Company v. Balfour	55 (1900)	Fuller	none	none	9th Cir.	dismissed
Wiley v. Sinkler	58 (1900)	Gray	none	none	C.C.D.S.C.	affirmed
Sully v. American National Bank	68 (1900)	Peckham	none	none	Tenn.	costs modified
Knott v. Botany Mills	69 (1900)	Gray	none	none	2d Cir.	affirmed
Hubbell v. United States I	77 (1900)	Shiras	none	none	Ct. Cl.	affirmed
Hubbell v. United States II	86 (1900)	per curiam	none	none	Ct. Cl.	rehearing denied
Good Shot v. United States	87 (1900)	Fuller	none	none	8th Cir.	certification
American Sugar Refining Company v. Louisiana	89 (1900)	Brown	none	none	La.	affirmed
United States v. Andrews	96 (1900)	Peckham	none	none	Ct. Cl.	affirmed
Crossman v. Burrill	100 (1900)	Gray	none	none	2d Cir.	reversed
Sigafus v. Porter	116 (1900)	Harlan	none	none	2d Cir.	reversed
In re Vidal	126 (1900)	Fuller	none	none	military tribunal	certiorari denied
Chapin v. Fye	127 (1900)	Fuller	none	Brown	Kalamazoo Cnty. Cir. Ct.	dismissed
Chesapeake and Ohio Railway Company v. Dixon	131 (1900)	Fuller	none	none	Ky.	affirmed
Scranton v. Wheeler	141 (1900)	Harlan	none	Shiras	Mich.	affirmed
Contzen v. United States	191 (1900)	Fuller	none	none	Ct. Cl.	affirmed
Lowry v. Silver City et al. Company	196 (1900)	Brewer	none	none	Utah	dismissed
Kizer v. Texarkana and Fort Smith Railway Company	199 (1900)	Peckham	none	none	Ark.	dismissed
Las Animas Land Grant Company v. United States	201 (1900)	Peckham	none	none	Ct. Priv. Land Cl.	affirmed
Baggs v. Martin	206 (1900)	Shiras	none	none	8th Cir.	certification
Abraham v. Casey	210 (1900)	White	none	none	La.	affirmed
Baldwin v. Maryland	220 (1900)	Brewer	none	none	Md.	affirmed
Stearns v. Minnesota	223 (1900)	Brewer	Brown; White	none	Minn.	multiple
Mutual Life Insurance Company of New York v. Cohen	262 (1900)	Brewer	none	none	9th Cir.	reversed
Williams v. Fears	270 (1900)	Fuller	none	none	Ga.	affirmed
City of New York v. Barker	279 (1900)	Peckham	none	none	N.Y.	affirmed
Wisconsin et al. R.R. Company v. Jacobson	287 (1900)	Peckham	none	none	Minn.	affirmed
Duluth and Iron Range Railroad Company v. St. Louis County	302 (1900)	White	none	none	Minn.	reversed
Avery v. Popper	305 (1900)	Brown	none	none	Tex.	dismissed
In re de Bara	316 (1900)	McKenna	none	none	N.D. Ill.	rule discharged
Wabash Railroad Company v. Tourville	322 (1900)	McKenna	none	none	Mo.	affirmed
Mason v. Missouri	328 (1900)	White	none	none	Mo.	affirmed
Gableman v. Peoria et al. Ry. Company	335 (1900)	Fuller	none	none	7th Cir.	certification
Austin v. Tennessee	343 (1900)	Brown	White	Brewer	Tenn.	affirmed
Chesapeake and Ohio Railway Company v. Kentucky	388 (1900)	Brown	none	none	Ky.	affirmed
Cincinnati Street Railway Company v. Snell	395 (1900)	Brown	none	none	Ohio	dismissed
Davis v. Burke	399 (1900)	Brown	none	none	C.C.D. Idaho	affirmed
Tyler v. Court of Registration	405 (1900)	Brown	none	Fuller	Mass.	dismissed
Huntting E. Company v. Bosworth	415 (1900)	White	none	none	7th Cir.	reversed
Chicago et al. Ry. Company v. Bosworth	442 (1900)	White	none	none	7th Cir.	reversed
Rau v. Bosworth	443 (1900)	White	none	none	7th Cir.	reversed
Bosworth v. Carr et al. Company	444 (1900)	White	none	none	7th Cir.	affirmed
Reymann Brewing Company v. Brister	445 (1900)	Shiras	none	none	C.C.S.D. Ohio	affirmed
United States v. Morrison	456 (1900)	McKenna	none	none	2d Cir.	reversed
Rothschild Brothers v. United States	463 (1900)	McKenna	none	none	2d Cir.	certification
Loeb v. Columbia Township	472 (1900)	Harlan	none	none	C.C.S.D. Ohio	reversed
United States v. Choctaw Nation	494 (1900)	Harlan	none	none	Ct. Cl.	reversed
Workman v. City of New York	552 (1900)	White	none	Gray	2d Cir.	reversed
Joyce v. Auten	591 (1900)	Brewer	none	none	6th Cir.	affirmed
Arkansas v. Schlierholz	598 (1900)	White	none	none	E.D. Ark.	dismissed
Missouri–Kansas–Texas Railroad Company v. Ferris	602 (1900)	Brewer	none	none	Tex. Civ. App.	affirmed
Kenaday v. Sinnott	606 (1900)	Fuller	none	none	D.C. Cir.	reversed
Board of Liquidation v. Louisiana	622 (1901)	White	none	none	La.	affirmed
Southern Railway Company v. Postal Telegraph Company Company	641 (1901)	Brewer	none	none	4th Cir.	affirmed
Dooley v. Hadden	646 (1901)	Shiras	none	none	2d Cir.	reversed
Patton v. Texas Pacific Railroad Company	658 (1901)	Brewer	none	none	5th Cir.	affirmed
Elgin National Watch Company v. Illinois Watch Case Company	665 (1901)	Fuller	none	none	7th Cir.	affirmed
Marks that cannot themselves be registered as trademarks but have achieved secondary meaning can still be protected from unfair competition; under the 1881 Act, circuit courts do not have jurisdiction over a dispute by two parties of the same state not involving a registrable trademark.

== See also ==
- Certificate of division
