= Menominee–Marinette Brewing Company =

Beer company in Menominee, MI, US (1933–1961)

The Menominee–Marinette Brewing Company was an American brewery that was located in Menominee, Michigan, from 1933 until 1961.

== History ==
The Menominee–Marinette Brewing Company was established as the Prohibition era came to an end. The brewery's articles of incorporation were drawn up in April 1933, and it merged the interests of the former Leisen and Henes Brewing Company and Menominee River Brewing Company, as well as their Prohibition-era successor, the United Beverage Company.

Because the United Beverage Company had been selling near beer during Prohibition, the new brewery was able to sell alcoholic beer as soon as the Michigan legislature approved the sale of 3.2% beer, which was legalized under the Cullen–Harrison Act. The company sold its first beer to the public on May 11, 1933.

In 1948, the brewery's license was suspended for 30 days after it was found guilty of selling two eighth barrels of beer to an 18-year-old minor from Marinette.

=== Personnel ===
When the brewery was founded in 1933, Walter Henes (1888–1947), the son of John Henes Sr. (a founder of the Leisen and Henes Brewing Company), was named company president; Arthur Rettke (1886–1950) of the United Beverage Company was named vice president; and Leo Erdlitz (1893–1969), the son of Franz Joseph "Frank" Erdlitz (1864–1937), the secretary and treasurer of the Menominee River Brewing Company and president of the United Beverage Company, was named secretary-treasurer. Wolfgang Rager (1883–1944), who had previously worked for the Walter Brewing Company of Eau Claire, was hired as the company's first brewmaster. He was later succeeded by Sigmund Lingelbach (1885–1960). After Henes's death in 1947, Erdlitz succeeded him as president.

=== Sale and closure ===
In 1959, the brewery was sold to the real estate broker Hugh Cavill (1903–1968) and truck line owner John Stang (1906–1977). The Menominee–Marinette Brewing Company closed in 1961.

== Brands ==
- Big Mac Beer
- Brewer's Best Pilsener Beer
- Holiday Brew
- Menominee Bock
- Menominee Champion Light Beer
- Old Craft Brew
- Silver Cream

== See also ==
- List of defunct breweries in the United States
