= Henry Lembeck =

Lembeck circa 1880-1900

Henry B. Lembeck (April 8, 1826 – July 25, 1904) was a Jersey City, New Jersey brewery owner.

== Biography ==
Born in Osterwieck, Germany (now part of Rosendahl), near Münster, he became a cabinet maker like his father and an apprentice at the age of 13. He was drafted into the army at the age of 20, but deserted during the German Revolution of 1848 and immigrated to the United States in 1849. Living in New York City, he worked first as a carpenter and then as a grocery clerk. In a few years, Lembeck set up his own successful grocery business. It was then that he met a successful brewer, John F. Betz, selling his beer in his store.

In 1869, Lembeck moved across the river and established a brewery with Betz in downtown Jersey City, New Jersey. The Lembeck and Betz Eagle Brewing Company would develop into one of the most successful breweries in the eastern United States producing a quarter of a million barrels of beer a year. As Lembeck grew financially successful, he also helped establish banks and real estate companies in Jersey City. Lembeck was the founder of the Greenville Banking and Trust Company and a director of the Third National Bank. He helped develop the township of Greenville (today it's a section of Jersey City) through real estate development of undeveloped land. Lembeck discontinued home building over a dispute with the city regarding the quality of water supplied to the Greenville area. After his retirement his son Gustav took over running the brewery. The brewery closed during Prohibition in 1920 and later went out of business. He lived in Greenville with his wife Emma and children in a mansion on Columbia Place, which has since been renamed Lembeck Avenue.

Lembeck died in Jersey City and is buried in Bayview – New York Bay Cemetery in Jersey City. The Lembeck mansion was later donated by his widow to St. Anne's Home for the Aged.

== See also ==
- Henry B. Lembeck bio on Find-A-Grave
