= George Klindt House =

Historic house in Iowa, United States

- U.S. National Register of Historic Places
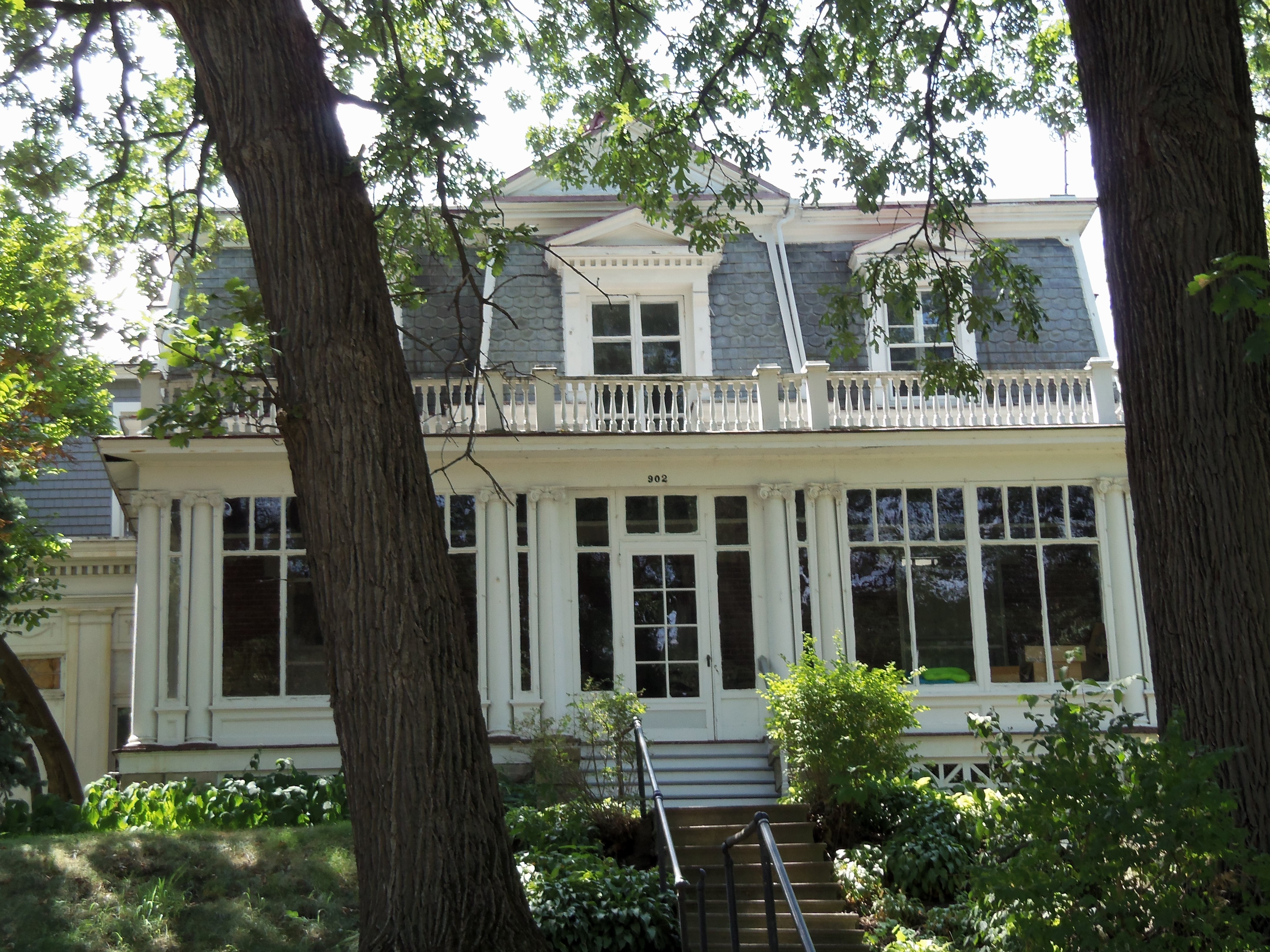

- Location within Iowa Location within the United States
- Location: 902 Marquette St. Davenport, Iowa
- Coordinates: 41°31′44″N 90°35′30″W
- Built: 1895
- Architectural style: Second Empire
- MPS: Davenport MRA
- NRHP reference No.: 83002459
- Added to NRHP: July 7, 1983

The George Klindt House is a historic building located in the West End of Davenport, Iowa, United States. It has been listed on the National Register of Historic Places since 1983.

== History ==
George Klindt became a partner in the Mengel & Klindt Brewery in 1891. He succeeded his father Henry who had partnered with George Mengel in 1876. Davenport's breweries merged in 1894 and became the Davenport Malting Company. George Klindt became the new company's secretary-treasurer. Built from 1894 to 1895, this house was the third of three houses built on Marquette Street for the partners of the brewery. George Mengel's house was at 826 and Henry Klindt's house was at 834.

== Architecture ==
The George Klindt House is a two-story structure that follows a square plan with a corner wing on the back of the house. It features a Mansard roof and pedimented dormers, which are typical of the Second Empire style. The enclosed porch and sedimented pediment on the front indicates that this house is from a later date of the style. The house is located on a high hill above the street. There is a large carriage house/garage with a gambrel roof behind the house.
