= List of defunct breweries in the United States =

At the end of 2017, there were a total of 7,450 breweries in the United States, including 7,346 craft breweries subdivided into 2,594 brewpubs, 4,522 microbreweries, 230 regional craft breweries and 104 large/non-craft breweries.

The following is a partial list of defunct breweries in the United States.

== 0–9 ==
- 5 Rabbit Cervecería

== A ==
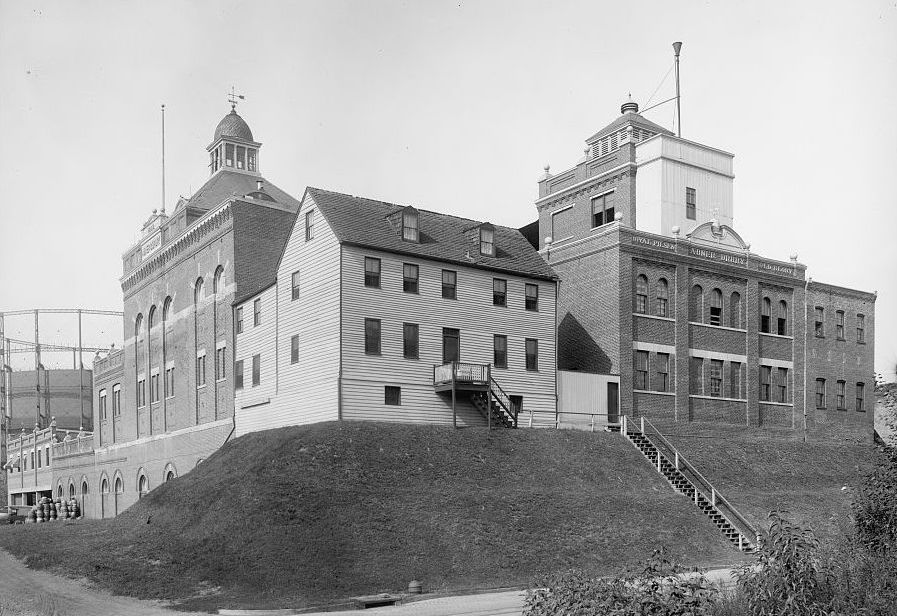
Abner-Drury Brewery, 1910.

- A. Gettelman Brewing Company
- Abner-Drury Brewery
- Albion Brewery
- American Brewing Company (New Orleans)
- American Brewing Company (Providence, Rhode Island)
- Angeles Brewing and Malting Company
- Arcadia Brewing Company
- Argus Brewery
- Ashland Brewing Company

== B ==
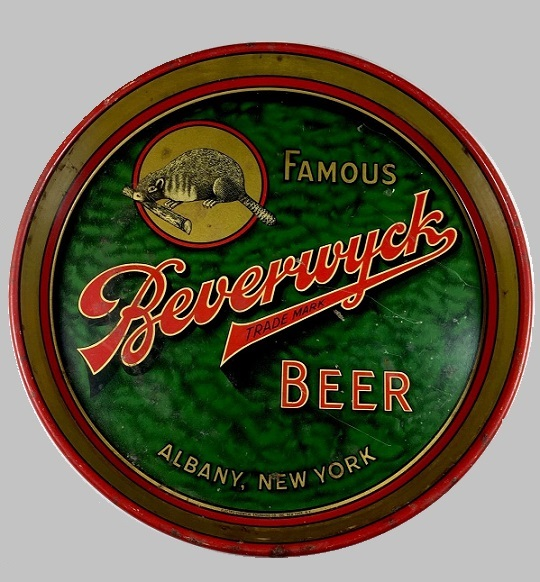
serving tray, Beverwyck Beer

- Bachmann's Brewery
- Bavarian Brewing Company
- Beverwyck Brewery
- Bosch Brewing Company
- Big Al Brewing
- Brown's Brewery
- Buckbean Brewing Company
- Bunker Hill Breweries

== C ==
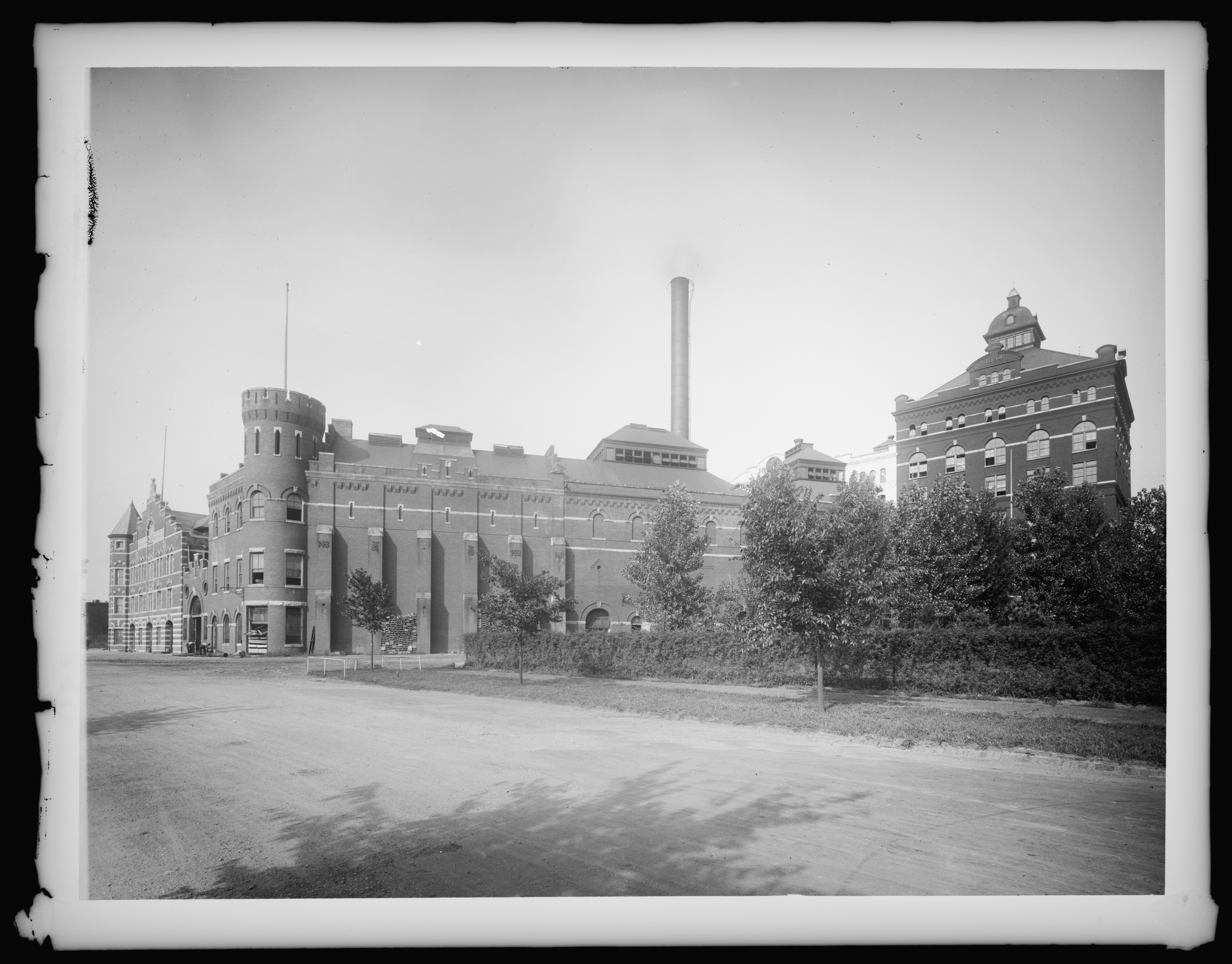
Christian Heurich Brewery at Foggy Bottom in 1910

- Charles D. Kaier Company
- Celis Brewing Company
- Christian Heurich Brewing Company
- City Park Brewery
- Class and Nachod Brewery
- Covington Brewhouse
- Cream City Brewing Company

== D ==
- Dobler Brewing Company
- Dubuque Star Brewery

== E ==
- Evansville Brewing Company

== F ==
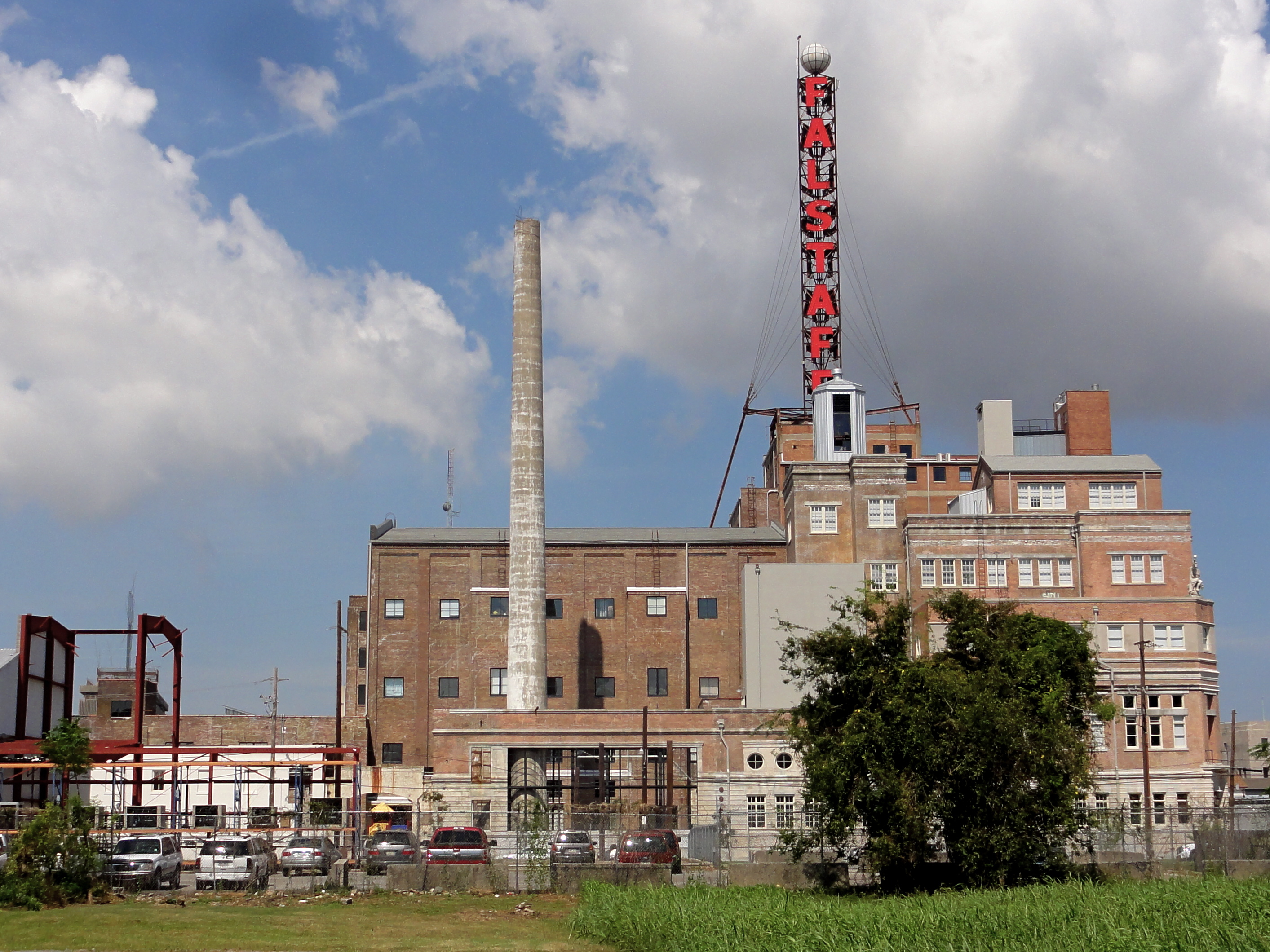
Falstaff Brewery building, New Orleans

- Falk Brewing Company
- Falls City Brewing Company
- Falstaff Brewing Corporation
- Fish Brewing Company
- Fitger's Brewing Company
- Fred Koch Brewery
- Fuhrmann & Schmidt Brewing Company

== G ==
- G. Heileman Brewing Company
- Goebel Brewing Company
- Gottfried Krueger Brewing Company
- Green River Brewery
- Geyer Brothers Brewery

== H ==
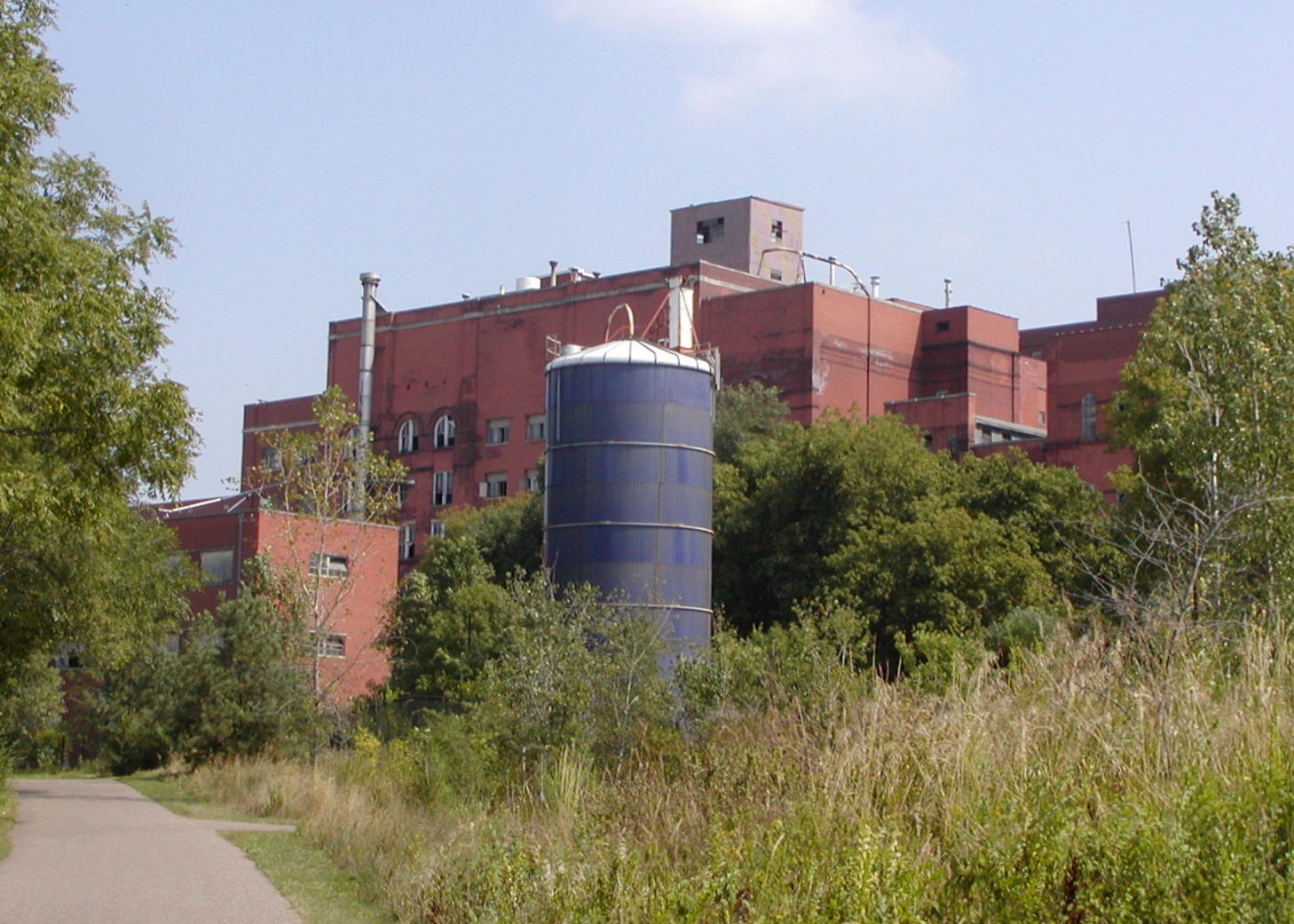
Brewery overlooks Swede Hollow in St. Paul

- Hair of the Dog Brewing Company
- Haffen Brewing Company
- Haffenreffer Brewery
- Hale's Ales
- Hamm's Brewery
- Hilliard's Beer
- Hinchliffe Brewing
- Hot Springs Hotel and Brewery

== I ==
- Independent Brewing Company of Pittsburgh
- Independent Milwaukee Brewery
- Iroquois Beverage Corporation

== J ==
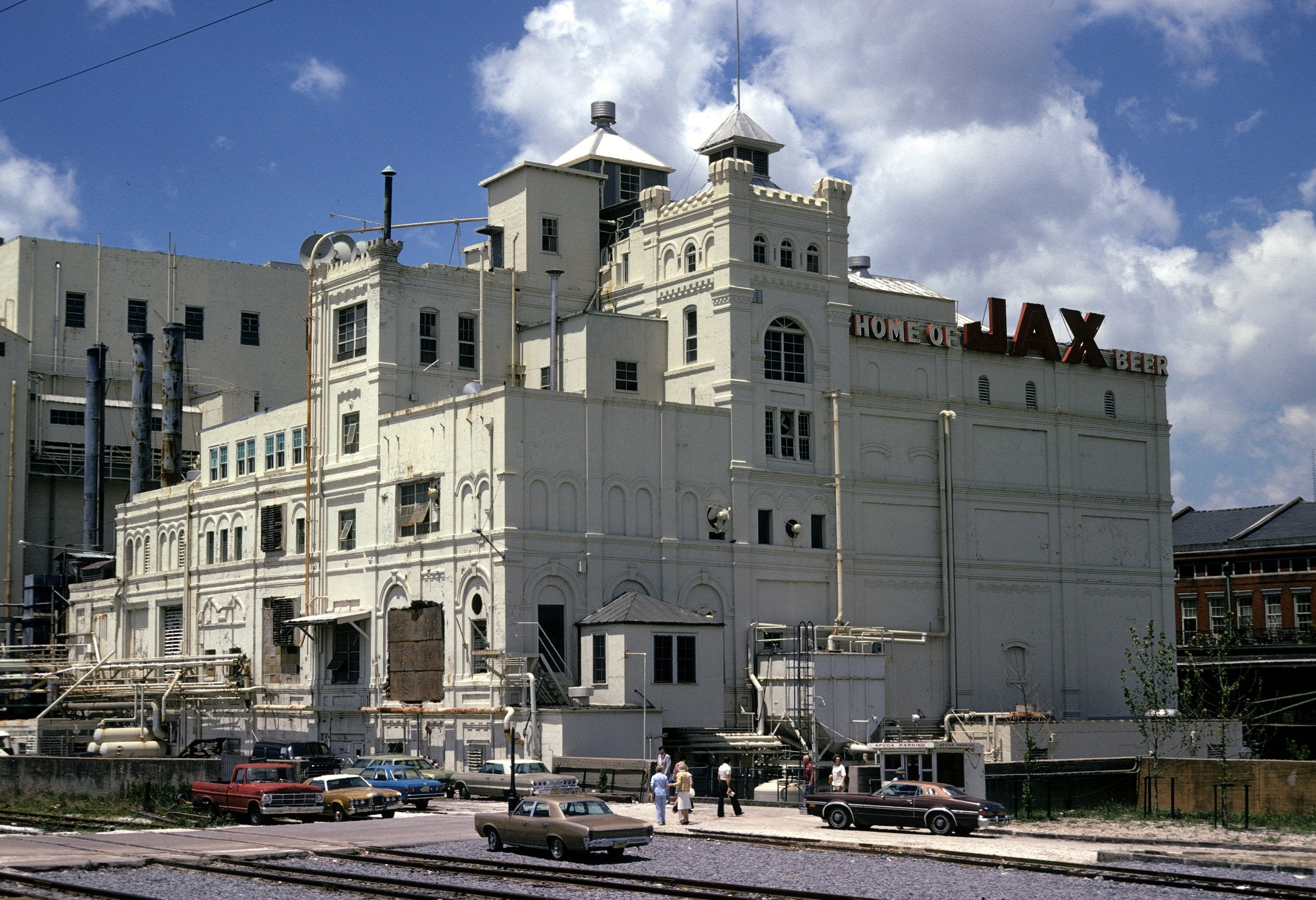
Jackson Brewery, 1976

- Jackson Brewing Company (New Orleans)
- James Page Brewing Company
- John F. Betz & Sons Brewery
- Jordan Brewery Ruins
- Joseph Schlitz Brewing Company
- Philipp Jung

== K ==
- Kingsbury Breweries Company
- Jackson Koehler Eagle Brewery
- Krug Brewery

== L ==
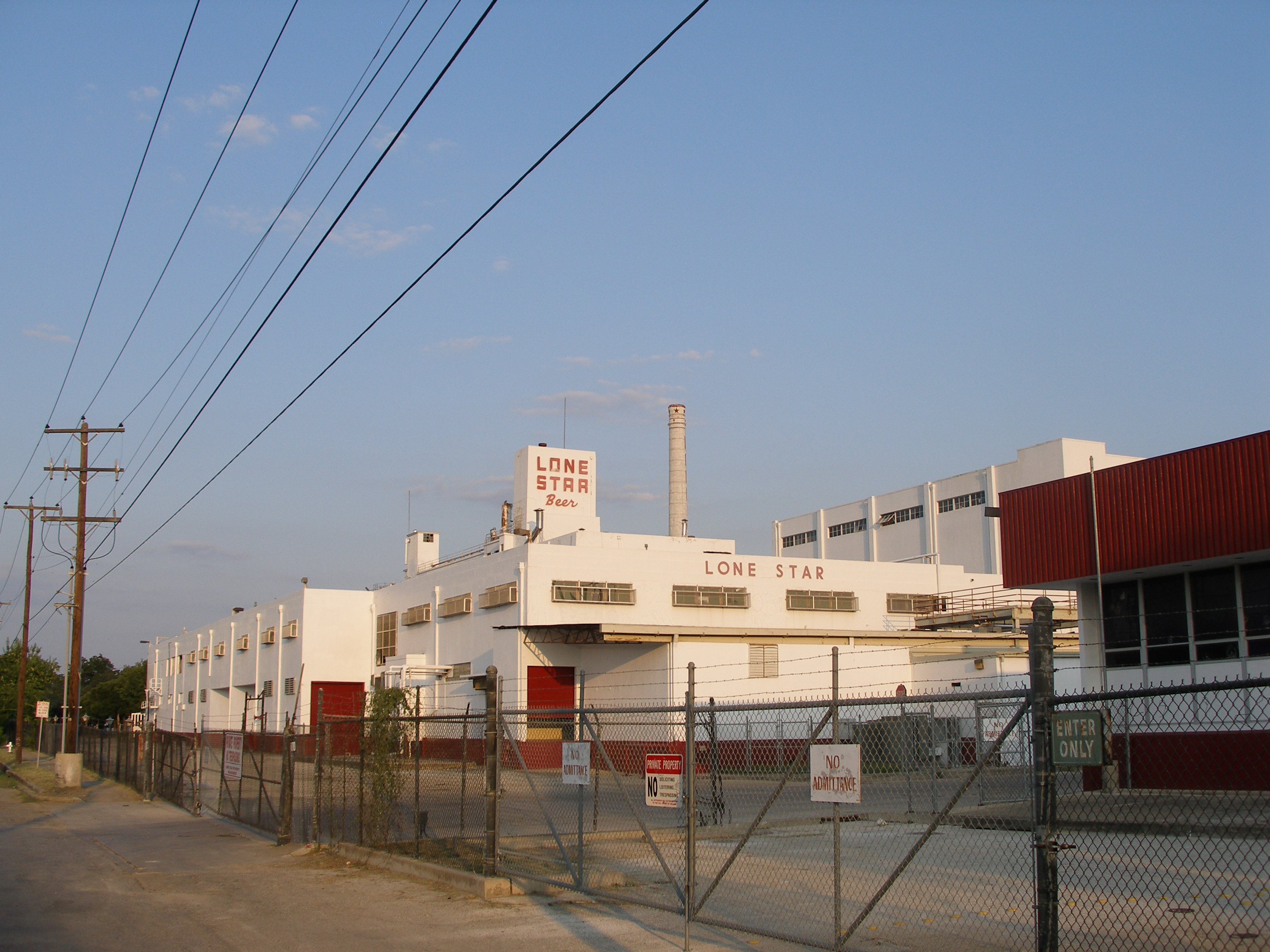
Lone Star Brewery 2006

- La Brasserie Brewery
- The Lembeck and Betz Eagle Brewing Company
- Littig Brothers/Mengel & Klindt/Eagle Brewery
- Lone Star Brewing Company

== M ==
- Manhattan Brewing Company of New York
- Mayfield Brewery
- Menominee–Marinette Brewing Company
- Menominee River Brewing Company
- Metropolitan Brewing
- Metz Brewery
- Michigan Brewing Company
- Minneapolis Brewing Company

== N ==
- Narragansett Brewing Company (original incarnation)

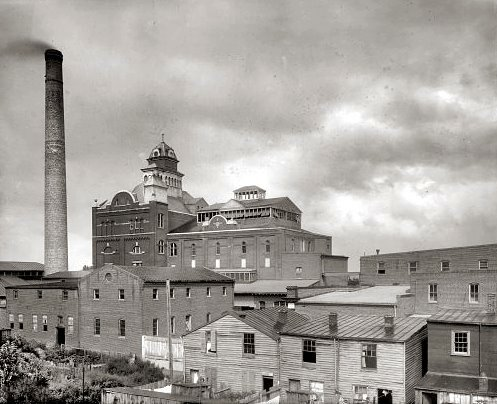
National Capital Brewing Company Building

- National Capital Brewing Company
- New Albion Brewing Company
- Northwestern Brewery

== O ==
- Jacob Obermann
- The Old Brewery
- Oldenberg Brewery, a defunct brewery and pub, and in Fort Mitchell, Kentucky – and The American Museum of Brewing Arts part of a Greater Cincinnati tourist expansion.
- Olympia Brewing Company
- Optimism Brewing Company

== P ==
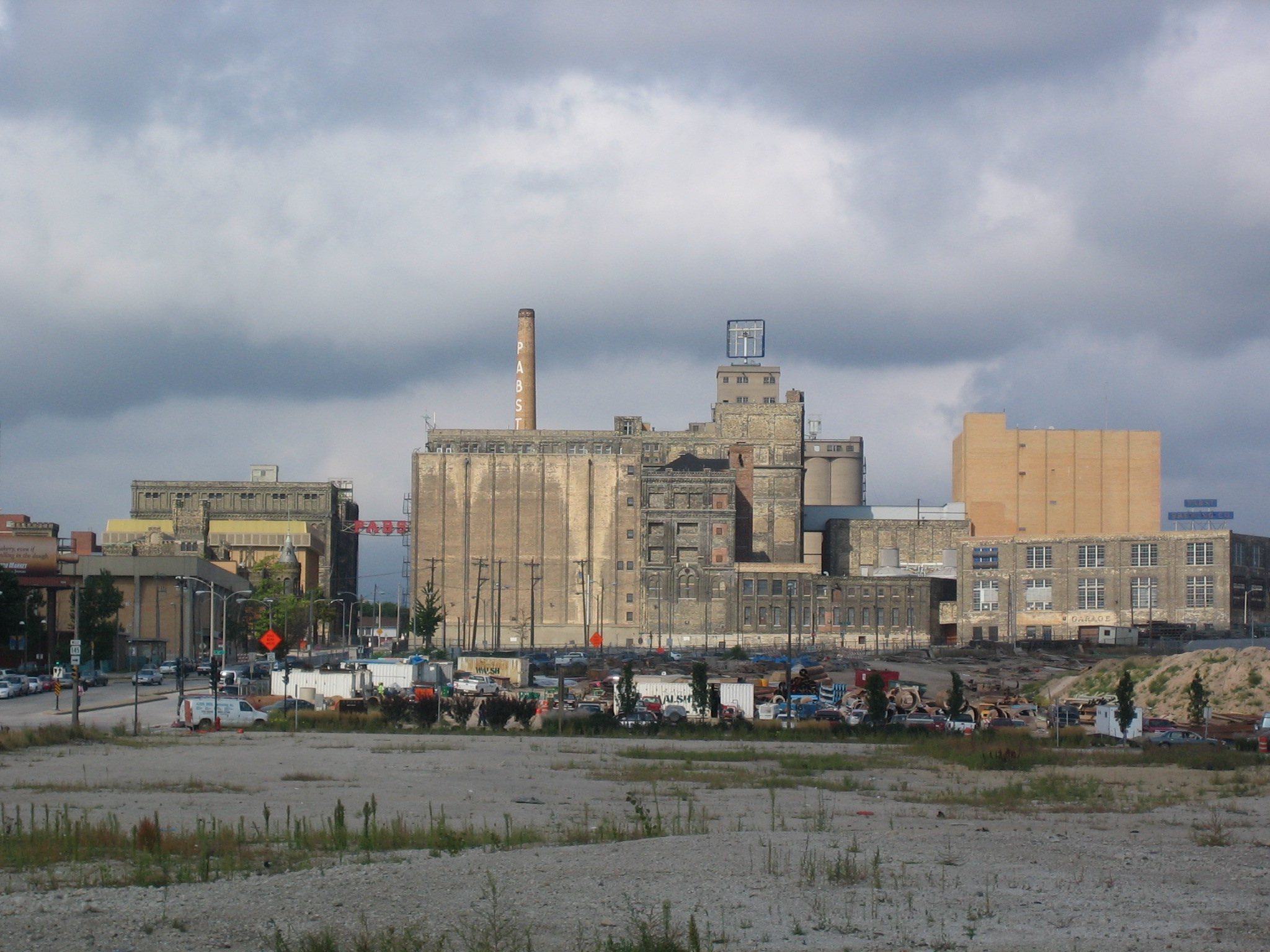
The former Pabst Brewery

- P. Ballantine and Sons Brewing Company
- Pabst Brewery Complex
- Paterson Consolidated Brewing Company
- Pearl Brewing Company
- Periolat brewery
- Pete's Brewing Company
- Pyramid Breweries

== Q ==
- Quinnipiac Brewery

== R ==
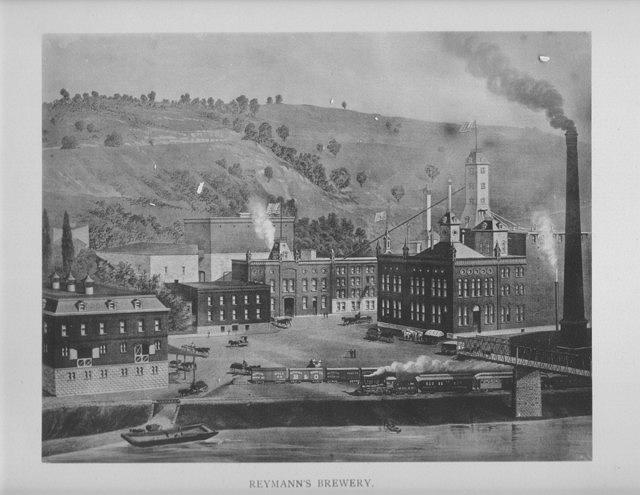
Reymann Brewing Company (1889)

- Rahr Brewery
- Rainier Brewing Company
- Rheingold Brewery
- Reisch Beer
- Reymann Brewing Company
- Rio Salado Brewing Company
- Rochester Brewing Company

== S ==
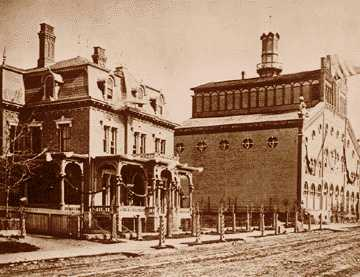
The original Stroh brewery at right, with the Stroh family home in foreground. Circa 1864

- San Diego Brewing Company
- Schaefer Beer
- Schoenhofen Brewing Company
- Small Town Brewery
- Southwestern Brewery and Ice Company
- Standard Brewing Company
- Standard-Rochester Brewing Company
- Stroh Brewery Company
- Sugar Loaf Brewery
- Sweetwater Brewery

== T ==
- Tennessee Brewing Company
- E. M. Todd Company
- Triaca Company
- Triangle Brewing Company
- Traveler Beer Company

== V ==
- Valentin Blatz Brewing Company
- Virginia Brewery

== W ==
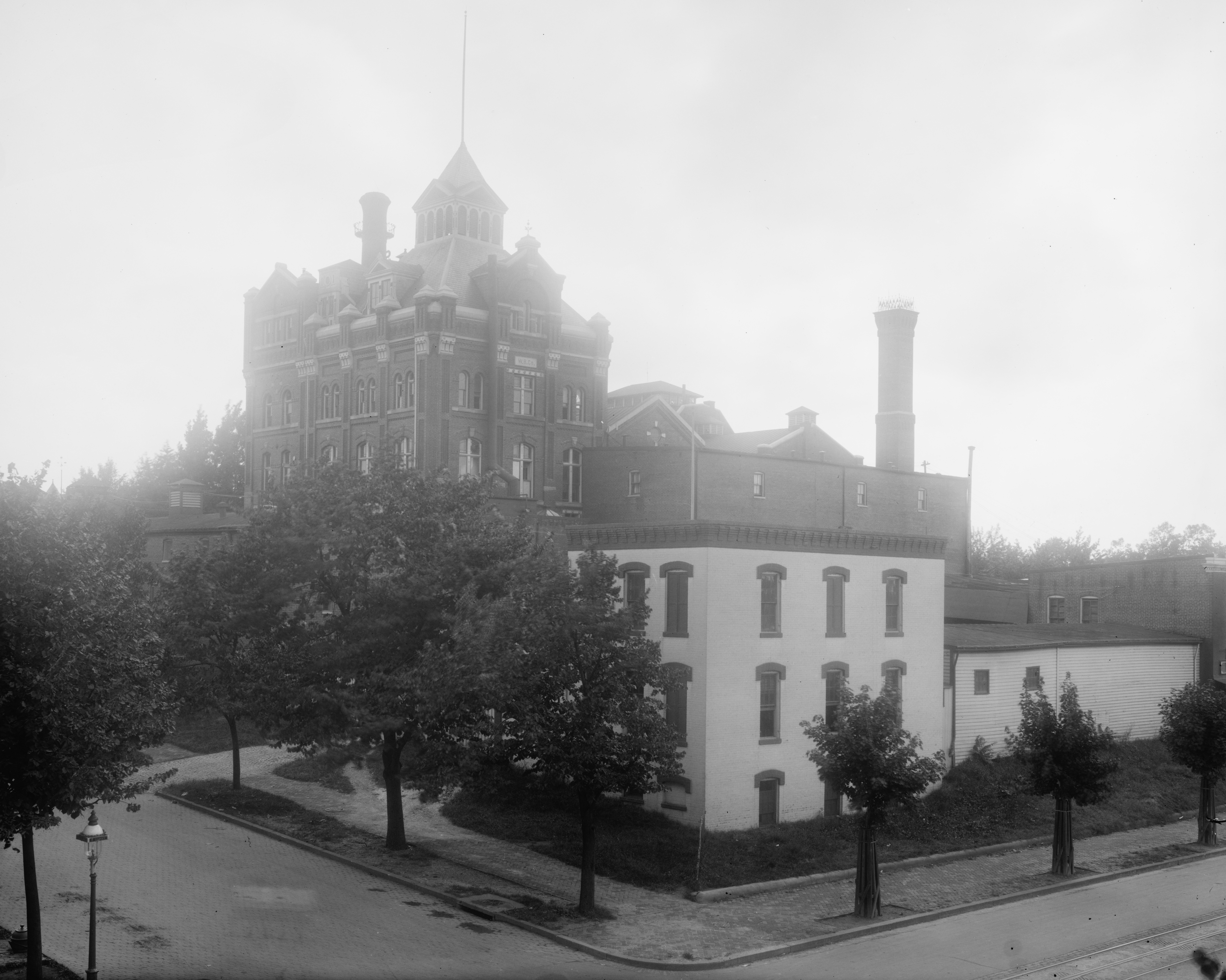
The Washington Brewery Company 1910

- Walter Brewing Company
- Washington Brewery Company
- Weinhard Brewery Complex
- White Squirrel Brewery - Bowling Green
- William Ulmer Brewery

== Y ==
- Yakima Brewing

== Z ==
- Zoller Bros-Independent Malting Co.

== See also ==
- Beer and breweries by region
- Beer in the United States
- List of microbreweries
