= E. M. Todd Company =

- U.S. National Register of Historic Places
- Virginia Landmarks Register
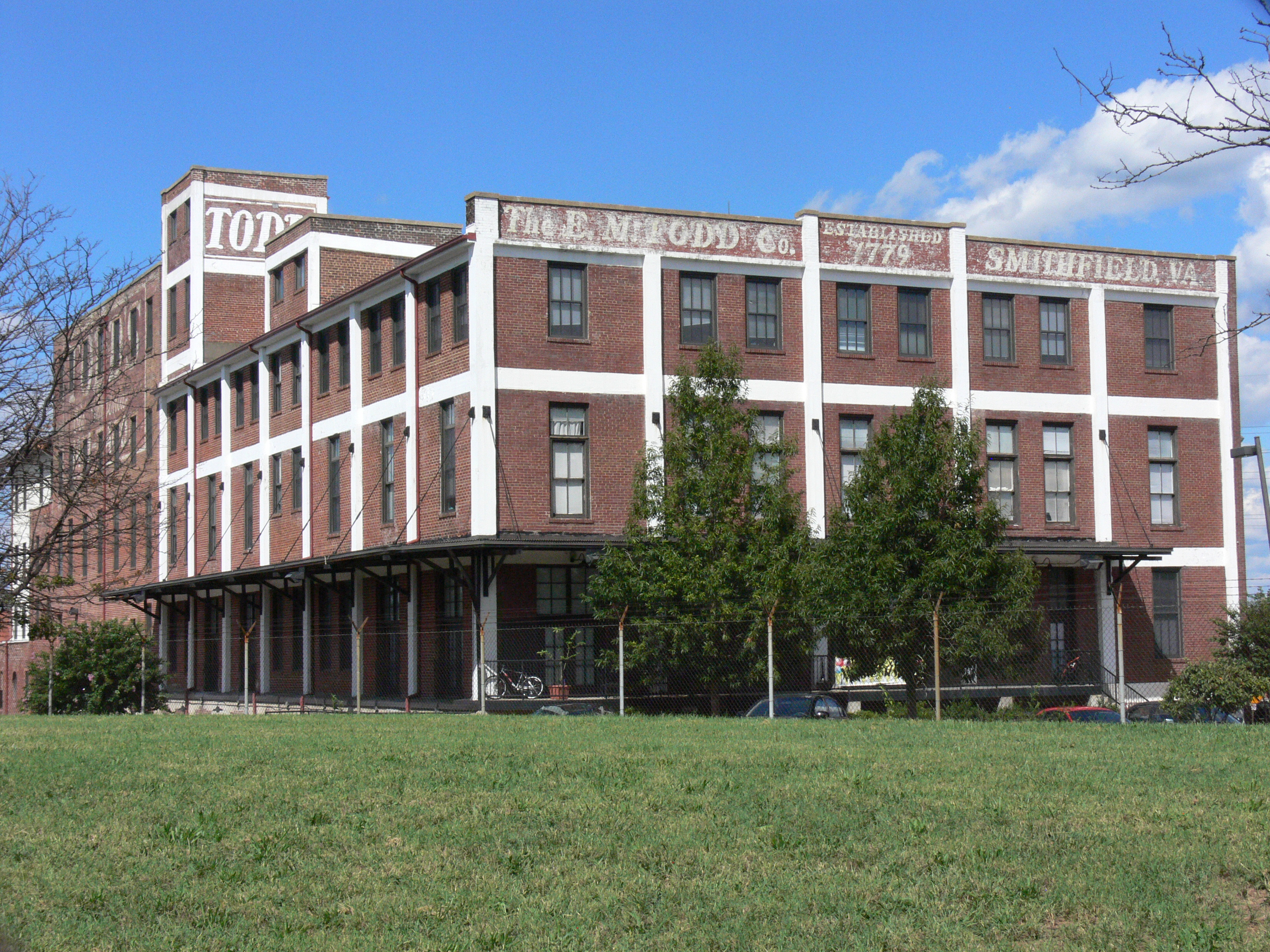
- E. M. Todd Company, September 2012

- Location within Virginia Location within the United States
- Location: 1128 Hermitage Rd., Richmond, Virginia
- Coordinates: 37°33′44″N 77°27′40″W
- Area: less than one acre
- Built: 1892, 1919, 1920
- NRHP reference No.: 02000997
- VLR No.: 127-5978

Significant dates
- Added to NRHP: September 14, 2002
- Designated VLR: June 12, 2002

E. M. Todd Company, also known as Todd's Ham Building, is a historic factory building located in the Three Corners District of Richmond, Virginia. The original section was built in 1892 and expanded in 1919 and 1920. The expansion included five story smoke houses. It originally housed the Richmond Brewery, and was later acquired by the E. M. Todd Company a manufacturer of smoked ham and bacon. The E. M. Todd Company ceased operations at the plant in 1998.

The building has been converted to loft apartments called the Todd Lofts. It was listed on the National Register of Historic Places in 2002.

== See also ==
- Richmond Brewery Stores
- List of defunct breweries in the United States
