= Rahr Brewery =

Beer company in Green Bay, WI, US (1866-1966)

The Rahr Brewery was an American brewery that was located in Green Bay, Wisconsin, from 1866 until 1966. The former site of the brewery is now occupied by a gas station.

== History ==
In 1858, Henry Rahr (1834–1891) and August Hochgreve (1828–1877) established a brewery in Allouez. The pair parted ways in 1866, and Henry Rahr established his own brewery, naming it the East River Brewery. In 1885 it was renamed Henry Rahr Sons & Co., in 1915 the Rahr Brewing Crop., in 1929 the Green Bay Products Co., and in 1933 the Rahr–Green Bay Brewing Corp.

On August 3, 1887, the boiler at the brewery exploded, resulting in the deaths of six workers.

Until the Prohibition era, the brewery was one of the largest in Wisconsin outside of Milwaukee. During the Prohibition era, the brewery produced near beer, but it also violated federal law by producing wort and alcoholic beverages. The brewery was shut down, and Joseph P. Neugent (1880–1934), who was leasing the property, was sent to prison.

During the brewery strike in Milwaukee in the 1950s, the Rahr Brewery supplied beer to Milwaukee, resulting in high profits.

The brewery was purchased by the Oshkosh Brewing Company of Oshkosh in 1966 and shut down, leaving Green Bay without a brewery of its own for the first time in 110 years.

== Brands ==
- All Star Brew (launched 1937)
- All Star Beer (1938, relaunched 1962)
- Badger Brand Beer (1937)
- Bock Beer (1901–1913, relaunched 1933)
- Centennial Brew (launched 1913)
- Corday Beer (launched 1948)
- Corn Husker Lager (launched 1933), distribution only
- Green Bay Beer (1933–1935)
- Holiday Brew (1960s)
- Kopper Vat (launched 1951)
- Neugo Beverage (1922–1928), prohibition product
- Old Fashion Brew (1919–1922)
- Old Imperial Pale (launched 1933)
- Old Imperial Bock (1933–1946)
- Our Special Brew (1901–1914)
- Our Standard Beer (1901–1913)
- Porter (launched 1880)
- Radium Beverage (1919–1922), prohibition product
- Rahr's Beer (launched 1951)
- Select Export Beer (1880–1890)
- Special Brew (1901–1913)
- Van Dyck Beer (launched 1949)
- Wisconsin Belgian Brew (launched 1963)

== See also ==
- List of defunct breweries in the United States
