= Arcadia Brewing Company =

Defunct brewery in Michigan, U.S.

- Industry: Alcoholic beverage
- Founded: 1996
- Founder: Timothy Suprise
- Headquarters: Battle Creek, Michigan
- Products: Beer

The Arcadia Brewing Company (also known as Arcadia Ales) was a brewery with facilities in Battle Creek and Kalamazoo, Michigan, United States, in operation from 1996 to 2019. At the time it ceased operations due to financing problems, it was one of Michigan's 25 largest craft breweries and distributed to eight states.

== History ==
The business first opened in 1996 as a pub in Battle Creek, owned by Tim Suprise (founder and president) along with several other shareholders. The restaurant TC's Wood-Fired Fare was founded alongside the microbrewery. The brewery's products were distributed in Michigan, Illinois, Indiana, Kansas, Kentucky, Missouri, New York, New Jersey, Ohio, and Pennsylvania; and in craft beer clubs in Washington and Canada.

All beers were produced in the brewery's 25 bbl Peter Austin brewhouse, and open-fermented in the brewery's cellar, using a traditional English ale yeast. In the spring of 2014, Arcadia completed a new building in Kalamazoo, a 30,000 square foot building, capable of producing 21,000 barrels annually. The Battle Creek facility closed in 2016.

Arcadia's year-round brews included Arcadia IPA (an India pale ale), Cheap Date (a session ale), Loch Down (a Scotch ale), Mango Suprise [sic] (an American IPA made with mango), Hopmouth (double IPA), Rapunzel (a wheat beer), and Sky High Rye (a pale ale). Its seasonal beers included Porter Rico (a porter with coconut), Shipwreck Porter (bourbon-barrel-aged, 12 percent ABV), and Whitsun Ale (a wheat ale).

The company ceased operations in September 2019, following a default on its mortgage.

In June 2020, the Superfluid Supply Co. division of Elk Rapids-based Short's Brewing announced its purchase of Arcadia's beer brands and intellectual property. "Arcadia was influential to the development of the Michigan Craft beer scene and was doing well until a few specific errors caused its failure," said Short's CEO Scott Newman-Bale. Superfluid relaunched Whitsun Ale under the Arcadia brand in July 2020, with plans to release other Arcadia brands in the future.

== Awards ==
2009 Great American Beer Festival

- Bourbon barrel-aged Cereal Killer Barleywine - Gold Medal

== See also ==
- Barrel-aged beer
- Beer in the United States
- List of defunct breweries in the United States
- Michigan Brewing Company
