= Fuhrmann & Schmidt Brewing Company =

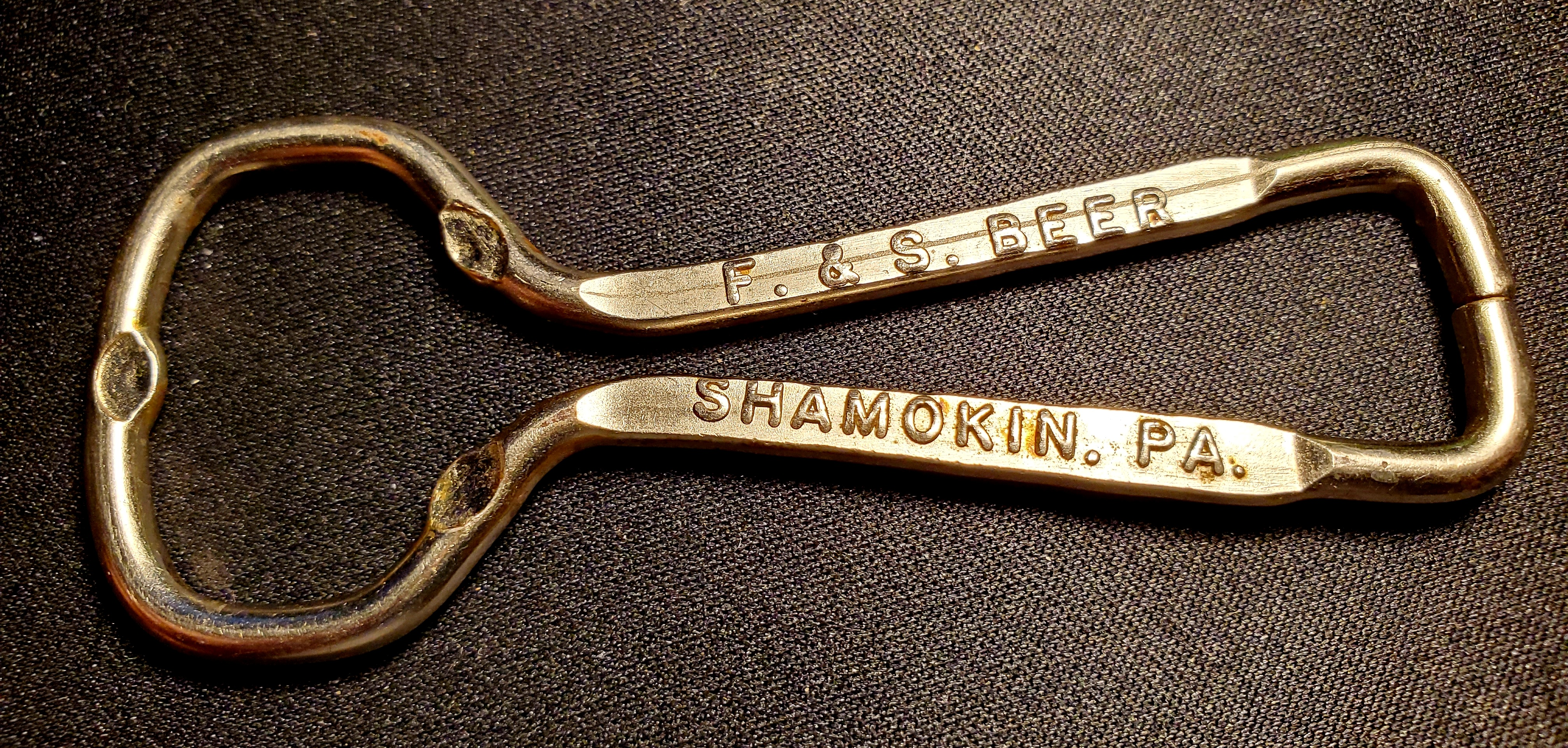
A bottle opener issued by the company

Fuhrmann & Schmidt Brewing Company was formed in 1906 and was located at Commerce and Washington Streets in Shamokin, Pennsylvania. Fuhrmann & Schmidt was the successor company to the Eagle Brewing Company (1854–1878), the M. Markel & Company (1878–1893) and Phillip H Fuhrmann (1893–1906).

The brewery produced F&S Beer and F&S Ale from 1906 until the brewery closed in 1920 for prohibition. The brewery reopened in 1933 and produced F&S Beer and F&S Ale until the brewery closed in 1975. From 1966 until 1975, Fuhrmann & Schmidt was owned by the H Ortlieb Brewing Company.

Prior to prohibition the tag line for F&S beer was "Cultivate the Habit, Drink F&S Beer".

== See also ==
- List of defunct breweries in the United States
