= Charles D. Kaier Company =

American beer brewery

- Location: Mahanoy City, Pennsylvania
- Opened: 1880
- Closed: 1968
- Key people: Charles D. Kaier (Founder)
- Owned by: Ortlieb Brewing Company (1966-1968)

The Charles D. Kaier Company was a beer brewery in Mahanoy City, Pennsylvania, that produced Kaier's brand beer from 1880 to 1968 under a succession of corporate identities. The company was sold to Philadelphia, Pennsylvania's, Ortlieb Brewing Company in 1966, and ceased producing beer in 1968.

== History ==
=== Predecessor company ===
Charles D. Kaier was born Anslem Troian Kaier in Binningen, Grand Duchy of Baden, Germany, on March 6, 1837, the son of blacksmith Andreas and Cresentia (Wittmer) Kaier. He had two brothers, Xavier and George, and two sisters. He immigrated with his family to the United States in 1854 at age 15 or in 1857 at age 19 (accounts differ). Living in Norristown and St. Clair, Pennsylvania, he served three months in a Pennsylvania volunteer infantry company during the American Civil War, and was honorably discharged. At some point, he Americanized his name to Charles D. Kaier.

After marrying teacher Margaret Curry, the daughter of Irish immigrants, Kaier settled in Mahanoy City, Pennsylvania, and became an agent for the Philadelphia brewery Bergner and Engle. He entered the liquor business in 1862, founding the Chas. D. Kaier Co., purchasing barrels of whiskey from distillers and transferring the liquid to quart and pint bottles for retail sale. As well, he dabbled in packaging and selling beer for local breweries.

=== Brewery ===
In the late 1870s, Kaier brought his cousin Franz Kaier from Germany to attend the American Brewing Academy in Chicago, Illinois, and eventually serve as brewmaster for Kaier's new concern, a beer brewery formed in 1880 as the Chas. D. Kaier Brewery. By one account, it was Chas. D. Kaier & Co. Brewery from 1882 to 1884, then the Francis X. Kaier Brewery through 1891, and the Chas. D. Kaier Brewing Co. through 1894, when it was renamed the Chas. D. Kaier Co. Ltd. Brewery. It retained that name for 26 years, until the advent of Prohibition in 1920. Until that law's repeal in 1933, the firm was known as the Kaier Brewing Co. Another account gives the corporate name as the Chas D. Kaier Brewing Co. from 1891 to 1894, and the Chas D. Kaier Co., Ltd. thereafter through 1966. However, a 1932 court case identifies the concern as the Charles D. Kaier Company, Inc.

During Prohibition, the company continuing operating under a permit to manufacture cereal beverages such as low-alcohol beer. The Kaier Brewing Co. regularly secured an annual permit for this until 1930, when U.S. Prohibition Commissioner James M. Doran declined to renew it. A district court ordered the administrator to renew the permit, but this decision was reversed on appeal. As the appeals court wrote in 1932:

The agents of the Prohibition Bureau visited the plant and found the applicant's employees rolling kegs on skids from the racking room of the brewery to a blacksmith shop across the way. The employees ran on seeing the agents. An agent found that the skids led to a pit which was connected with a cellar under the shop. Voices and the odor of beer came from the cellar. The agent immediately went to obtain assistance, and, on returning, found the pit covered by a steel plate, the shop locked, and admittance refused. The next day they were again refused a view of the cellar, and finally, upon securing a search warrant, found that the pit leading to the cellar had been closed with fresh concrete. The cellar bore evidence that it had been used as a "drop" from which illegal beer might be disposed of.

== See also ==
- List of defunct breweries in the United States
