= Periolat brewery =

Periolat Brewery
- Industry: Brewing
- Founded: 1850; 175 years ago in Chicago, Illinois, United States
- Founder: Napoleon Periolat
- Defunct: 1905
- Fate: Acquired
- Headquarters: United States

The Periolat brewery was founded in 1850 by Napoleon Periolat near Chicago, Illinois. There are sources placed the establishment of the brewery in 1898, attributing its foundation to Henry Periolat. The brewery was across modern-day Milwaukee Avenue from the Union Hotel in Wheeling. Periolat brewery was among the companies that adopted refrigeration technology in order to improve its brewing capabilities. The brewery operated continuously under the management of the Periolat family until 1905, when it was sold by Robert and Henry Periolat. The brewery was razed in 1909.

== See also ==
- List of defunct breweries in the United States
