= Tennessee Brewery =

- U.S. National Register of Historic Places
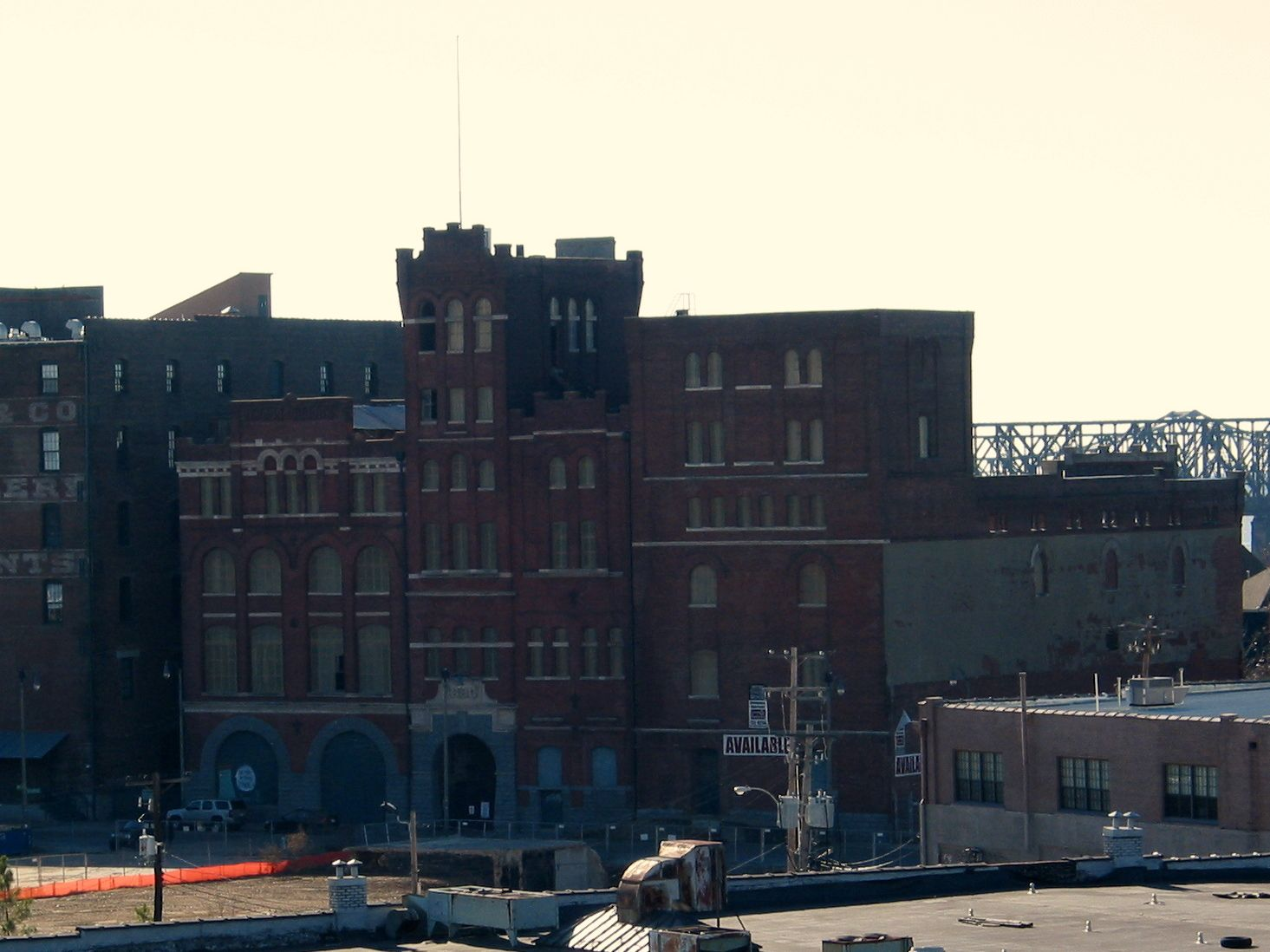
- Tennessee Brewery

- Location within Tennessee
- Location: Memphis, Tennessee
- Coordinates: 35°8′2.07″N 90°3′45.67″W
- Built: 1890
- Architect: E. Jungenfel & Co.
- Architectural style: Romanesque
- NRHP reference No.: 80004482
- Added to NRHP: November 25, 1980

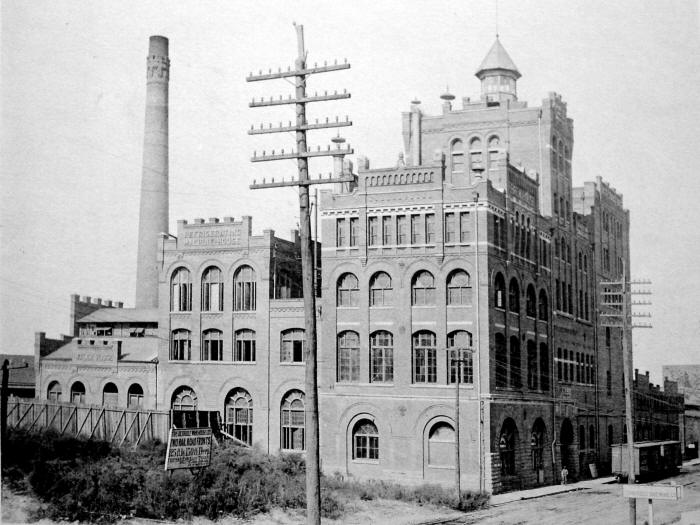
Tennessee brewery in 1895

Early Tennessee Brewery Postcard

The Tennessee Brewery building stands at the intersection of Butler and Tennessee streets in Memphis, Tennessee. It is directly on the bluff overlooking the Mississippi River. The building once housed the Tennessee Brewing Company, a leader in early brewery production.

== History ==
The brewery was originally organized in 1877 by George H. Herbers as "The Memphis Brewing Company". In 1885, it was bought by J. W. Schorr, Casper Koehler, and associates, and soon became one of the largest breweries of the era.

The first beer marketed from the brewery was a Pilsener. Like many other brands of the time, the beers were not usually named. Instead, the type or style of the beer was used as the name, along with the name of the brewery. They also produced several other beer styles. An ad from 1890 lists their styles as Pilsener, Export, Budweiser, Tennessee Pale, and Bavarian. Later, two new brands called Columbian Extra Pale and Erlanger were also produced, before prohibition shut down operations.

At one point, more than 1500 workers worked at the brewery. By 1903, production was up to 250,000 barrels per year making it the largest brewery in the south. Prohibition shut down operations, however after prohibition ended, the plant was reopened by J. W.'s son, John Schorr. Very rapidly, they got back up to production speed, and the best known and leading beer sold in Memphis for many years was "Goldcrest". After 1938 the beer was named "Goldcrest 51", to honor more than 51 years in the brewing business.

Goldcrest 51 was a bottled beer until 1947, when they started using cans. As a somewhat local beer, the brewery actually used returned bottles up until they ceased all operations, in 1954.

The building that remains today was erected in 1890 and is basically unchanged from that time (other than renovations performed to keep the building intact for possible further development in the future). The bottling plant was an add-on to the building much later, in 1938. Plans have been made in the past to turn the building into condominiums or shopping space, however none of these have occurred.

Goldcrest

Goldcrest 51

Pilsener

Pearl of Memphis

== Current status ==
The Tennessee Brewery was previously owned by The Tennessee Brewery LLC. The 65,720 square feet (6,106 m^{2}) property was appraised in 2005 at $248600. Brewery Tennessee LLC transferred the property for $350000 to The Tennessee Brewery LLC in 1999. It was transferred to Brewery Tennessee LLC in 1995 from Marvin Ratner.

After the Tennessee Brewery "Untapped" event held there during the spring of 2014, the revived interest in the brewery led it to be purchased for $825000 by Billy Orgel, a cell phone tower developer based in Memphis. The event was held again, as a "Revival" in the spring of 2015, before development work began on the building that fall. The current owner of record is "495 Tennessee LLC". Modification work has been done to turn the building into apartments, and units are available for reservations on an as available basis.

== See also ==
- List of defunct breweries in the United States
