= Pete's Brewing Company =

Brewery

- Location: San Antonio, Texas, USA
- Opened: 1986
- Closed: 2011
- Owned by: The Gambrinus Company

Active beers
Name	Type
Pete's Wicked Ale	American brown ale
Strawberry Blonde	Golden lager
Rally Cap Ale	Ale
Wanderlust Cream Ale	Cream ale

Pete's Brewing Company was founded by homebrewer Pete Slosberg and Mark Bronder in 1986. Its major product line was Pete's Wicked Ale, an American Brown Ale that is 5.3% alcohol by volume. The company was acquired by the Gambrinus Company in 1998, a company that owns the Spoetzl Brewery in Texas, the Bridgeport Brewery in Oregon and the Trumer Brauerei in Berkeley. In 2004, Pete's Brewing Company was number 42 in America for sales by volume.

== Brand discontinuation ==
Pete's Wicked Ales's brand owner, The Gambrinus Company, discontinued the Pete's Wicked Ale brand in 2011, sending letters to their distributors citing "rapidly declining sales volumes".

In 2016, Hoppin Frog Brewery in Akron, Ohio brought back Pete's Wicked Ale with Wicked Re-Pete 2X.

== See also ==
- List of defunct breweries in the United States
