= Virginia Brewery =

- U.S. National Register of Historic Places
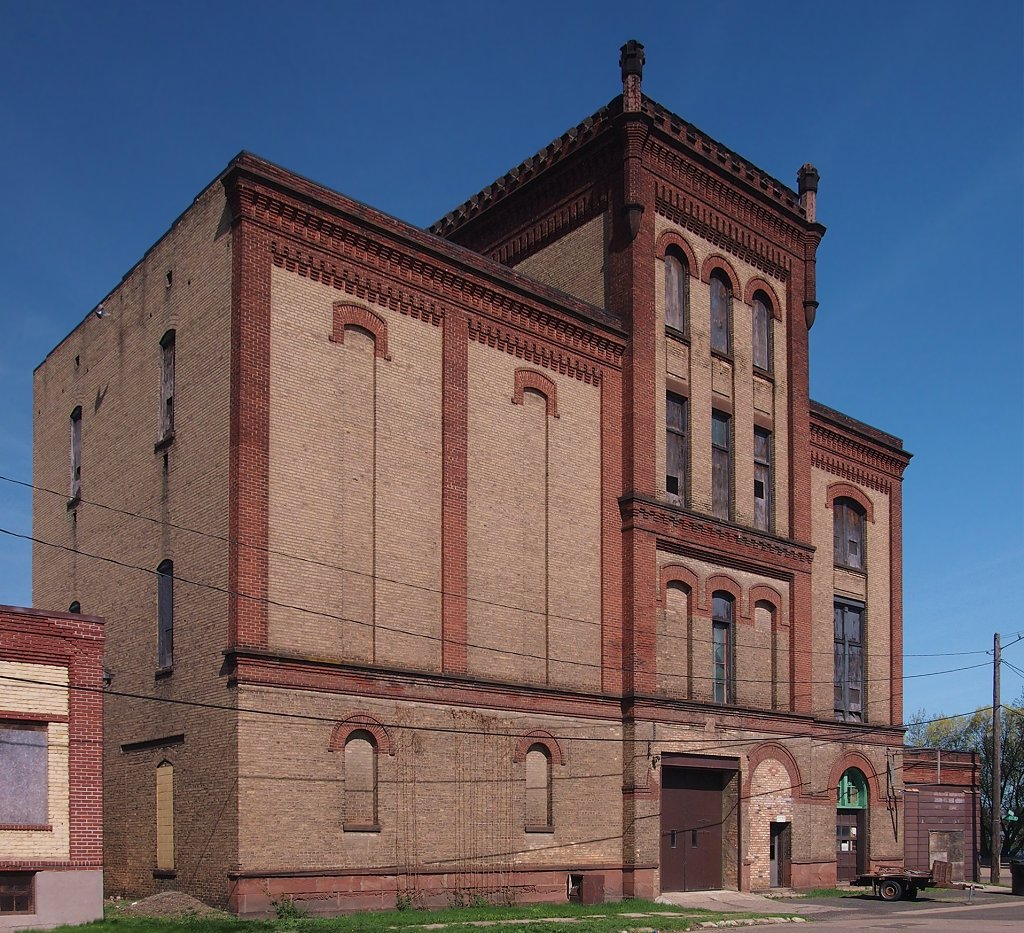
- The Virginia Brewery viewed from the southeast

- Location within Minnesota Location within the United States
- Location: 305 S. 7th Avenue, Virginia, Minnesota
- Coordinates: 47°31′16″N 92°32′34″W
- Area: Less than one acre
- Built: 1905
- Architect: H. Eilenberger & Co.
- Architectural style: Richardsonian Romanesque
- NRHP reference No.: 80004363
- Added to NRHP: August 27, 1980

The Virginia Brewery is a former brewery in Virginia, Minnesota, United States. It was built in 1905 and closed during Prohibition. The building was listed on the National Register of Historic Places in 1980 for its local significance in the themes of architecture, commerce, and industry. It was nominated for being a distinctive example of the local breweries that contributed to economic and social life (through athletic sponsorships) of the Iron Range before Prohibition and competition from larger brands put them out of business.

== See also ==
- National Register of Historic Places listings in St. Louis County, Minnesota
- List of defunct breweries in the United States

== Gallery ==
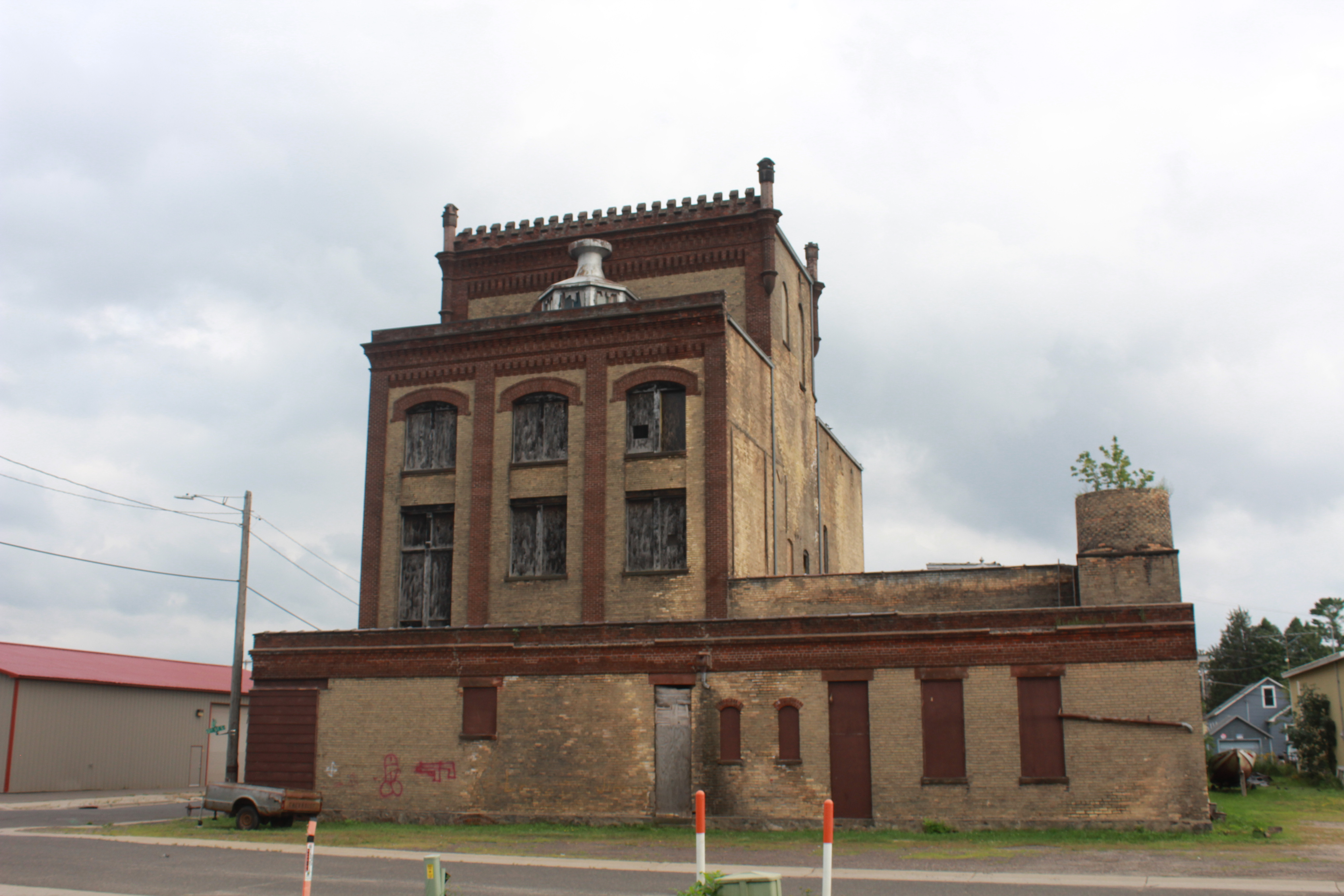
Side view

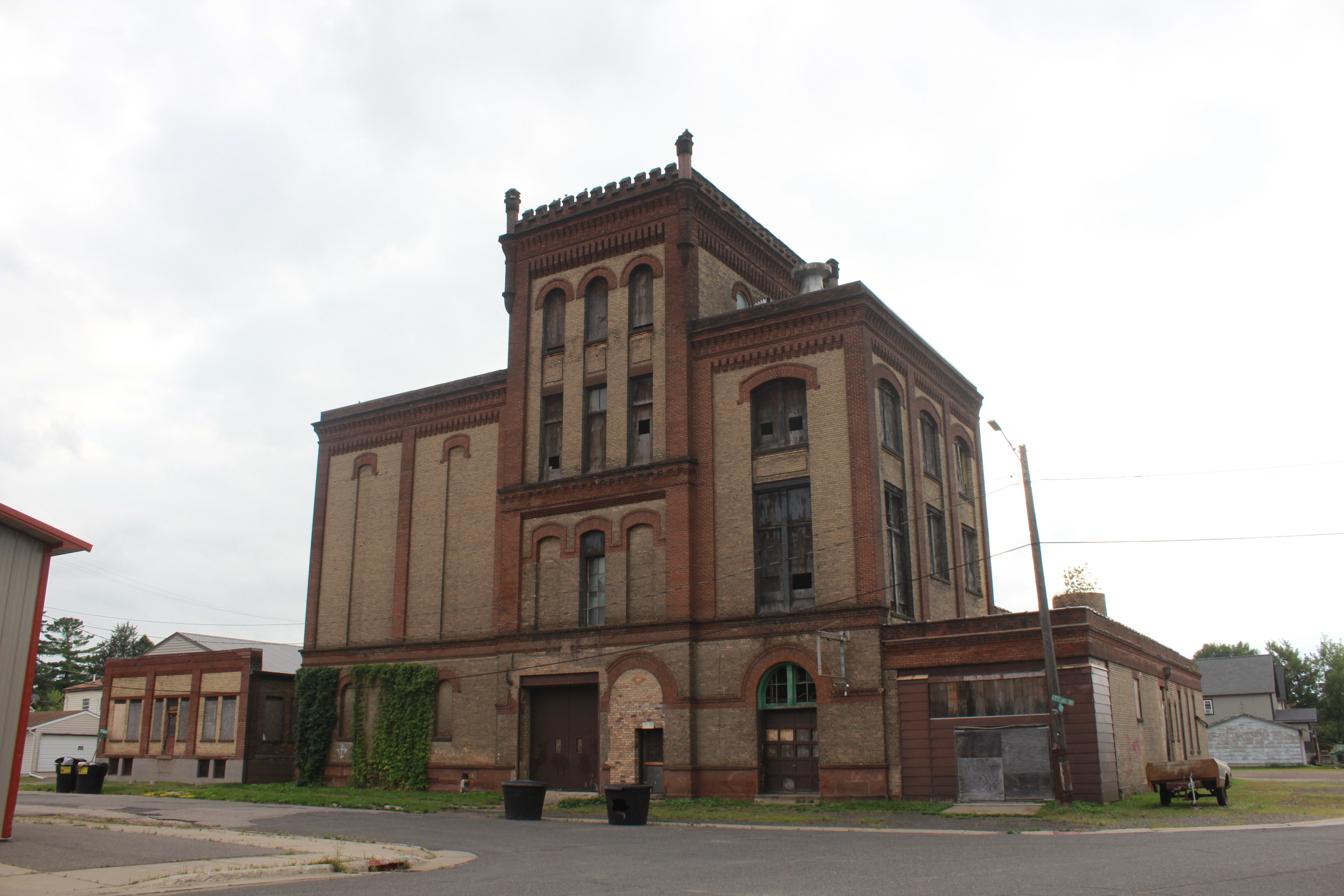
Viewed from the Northeast

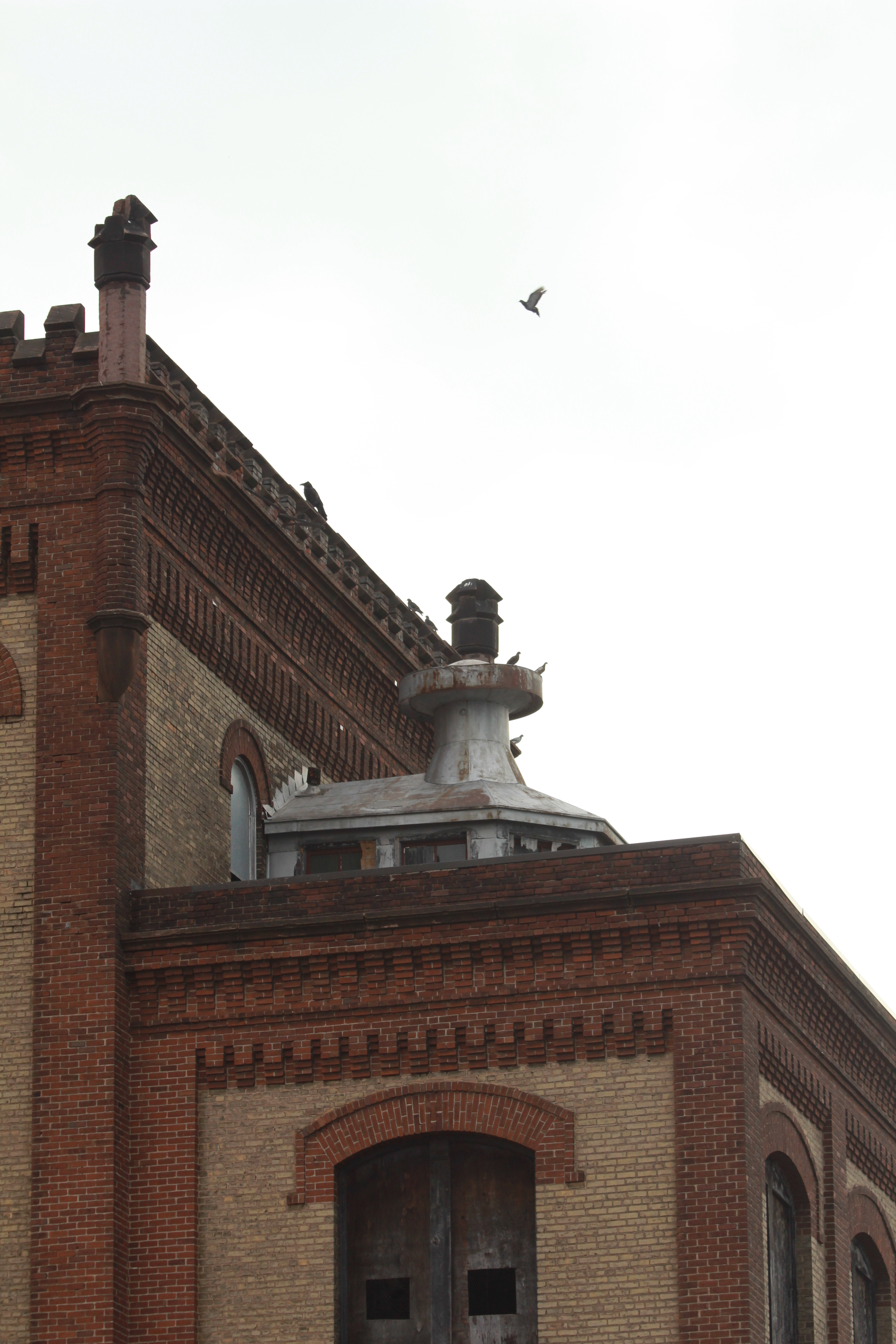
Detail of roof
