= Tanzania Safari Channel =

- Country: Tanzania
- Broadcast area: Tanzania
- Headquarters: Dar es Salaam

Programming
- Languages: Swahili and English
- Picture format: 576i SDTV

Ownership
- Owner: Tanzania Broadcasting Corporation

History
- Launched: 15 December 2018; 7 years ago

Links
- Website: tanzaniasafarichannel.go.tz

Availability

Terrestrial
- StarTimes: Channel 331

The Tanzania Satellite Channel is a television channel owned by the Tanzania Broadcasting Corporation. Its goal is to promote the preservation of the country's wildlife, as well as tourism.

== History ==
The channel was announced in November 2018 and opened on 15 December 2018, per a directive by then-president of Tanzania John Magufuli. According to Adolf Mkenda, the channel would air programming not only related to wildlife, but also programs related to cultural activities and archaeological findings. On 16 January 2019, the channel started broadcasting on Azam TV, as well as on an Intelsat satellite to cater much of Africa, parts of Europe and the Arab World.

In January 2025, it launched a programme on the slave trade, The Slave Caravan. In June, it launched a campaign with WildAid, Mimi ni Mhifadhi, dedicated to environmental conservation.
