= Zoller Bros-Independent Malting Co. =

- U.S. National Register of Historic Places
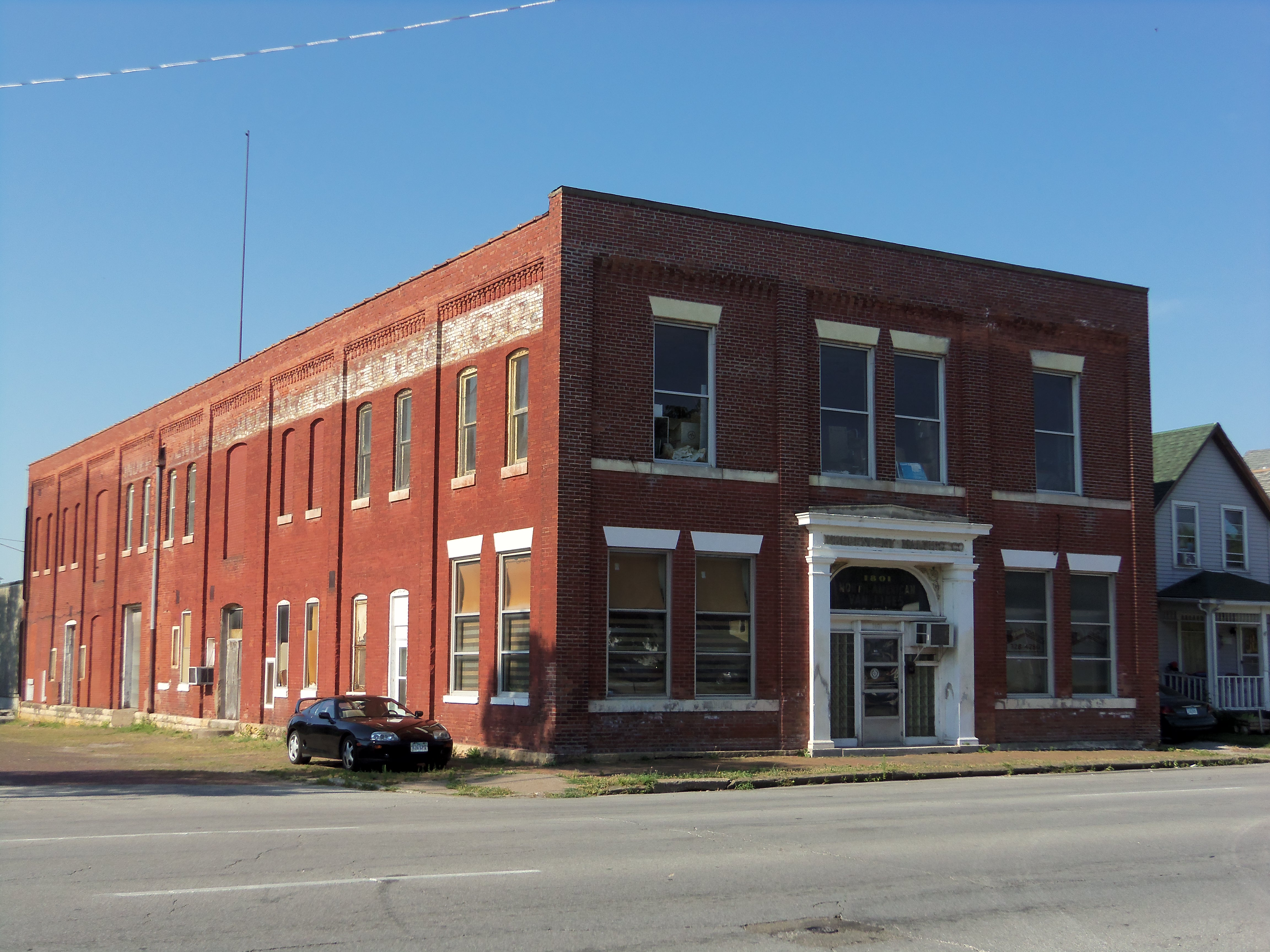

- Location within Iowa Location within the United States
- Location: 1801 W. 3rd Street; Davenport, Iowa
- Coordinates: 41°31′19″N 90°36′11″W
- Built: 1895
- MPS: Davenport MRA
- NRHP reference No.: 83002527
- Added to NRHP: July 7, 1983

The Zoller Bros-Independent Malting Co. building is located on the edge of an industrial area in the west end of Davenport, Iowa, United States. It has been listed on the National Register of Historic Places since July 7, 1983.

== History ==
The beer brewing industry in Davenport got its start after large numbers of German immigrants arrived in Davenport in the 1850s. The larger breweries developed after the end of the American Civil War. Five breweries were functioning in the city: Mathias Frahm and Son, Koehler and Lange (also known as Arsenal Brewery), Littig Brothers (later Mengel and Klindt and Eagle Brewery), Julius Lehrkind's Brewery and Zoller Brothers. They all distributed their beer mainly in Davenport, Rock Island, Illinois and Moline, Illinois.

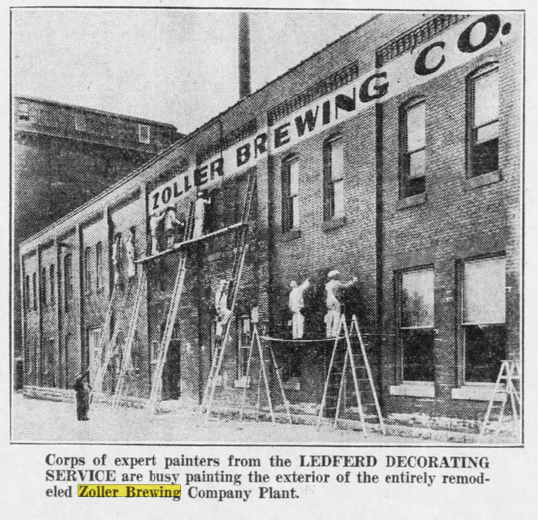
Zoller Brewing, April 1935

Brothers Ernest, Herman and Charles Zoeller established the Zoeller Brothers Malt House in the mid-1880s in the Black Hawk area of Davenport's west end. In 1890 they reopened the Black Hawk brewery their father, Ernst Zoeller Sr., had operated prior. In 1894 all the breweries consolidated into a single corporate structure called The Davenport Malting Company. They built this building in an industrial section of the west end that contained some of the first refrigeration equipment used in the city. As they built new additions on to the plant they closed the older structures. Production reached a high of 75,000 barrels of beer by 1916, and it became the second largest brewery in Iowa.

Independent Malting Company was formed in 1896 in the Zoller Brothers building after they had consolidated their operations two years prior with the other companies. Davenport Malting Company was divided into two firms in 1904, Davenport Brewing Co. and Hawkeye Realty Co. Both The Davenport Malting Company and Independent Malting Company closed with national Prohibition in 1916. Over 150 people from both companies lost their jobs. A black market for alcohol took hold in the city until Prohibition was lifted in 1933. Zoller Brewery reopened and began selling beer in May 1935 and by 1941 they grew to become the largest brewery in Iowa. In December 1940 they had expanded to Iowa City at 321 Market Street, as one of 11 branches in Iowa and Illinois. From the Iowa City location they distributed Zoller and Topping beers as well as Hur-Mon soda/pop beverages. They employed 250-300 people and their annual output was 150,000 barrels of beer that was distributed in nine states and in 2,000 cities. The company changed its name to the Blackhawk Brewery in 1945. It ended production in 1952 with the rise of national brands.

The Uchtorff Brewing Company operated out of the facility for several years before they folded. The building has been used by North American Van Lines as a warehouse in subsequent years.

Plans to turn the building back into a brewery with a museum started in 2019. Andrew Arnold says that the location will have a museum in the front of the building, a pub on the main floor, a brewery in the back, and a place for local brewers to grow their craft on the second floor.

Development of the brewery was put on hold indefinitely in April 2020 due to the COVID-19 pandemic. In March 2023 Zillow stated the building had an assessed value of $166,000. As of May 2023, the building is still for sale.

== Architecture ==
The former brewery is an example of a combined office and industrial building from the 19th century. It is a two-story, brick structure that features a tripartite front, nine window-bays on each side and segmental arches. It has a recessed entrance with engaged piers, entablature and shallow pediment.

== See also ==
- List of defunct breweries in the United States
