= The Lembeck and Betz Eagle Brewing Company =

- U.S. National Register of Historic Places
- New Jersey Register of Historic Places
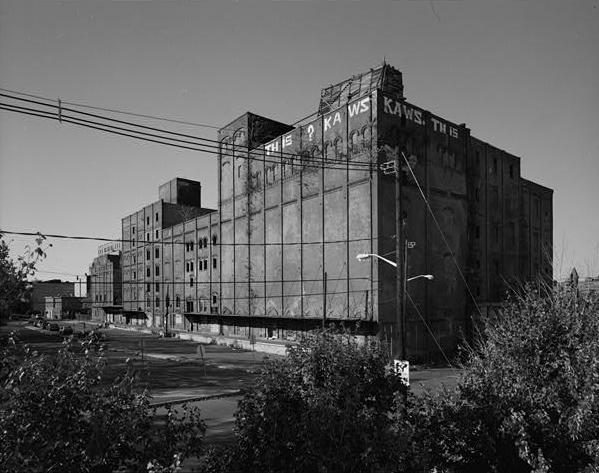
- The Lembeck and Betz Eagle Brewing Company

- Location within Hudson County, New Jersey
- Location: Jersey City, New Jersey
- Coordinates: 40°43′42″N 74°2′29″W
- Area: 2.5 acres (1.0 ha)
- Built: 1869
- Architectural style: Italianate
- Demolished: 1997
- NRHP reference No.: 84002707
- NJRHP No.: 1517

Significant dates
- Added to NRHP: June 21, 1984
- Designated NJRHP: May 17, 1984

The Lembeck and Betz Eagle Brewing Company was founded in 1869 by Henry B. Lembeck and John F. Betz in Jersey City, in Hudson County, New Jersey, United States. The brewery, bounded by 9th, 10th, Grove, and Henderson streets in downtown Jersey City, developed into one of the most famous, best-equipped, and financially successful breweries on the East Coast of the United States.

== History ==
In 1849 Henry Lembeck left the German military and immigrated to the US. He found work as a carpenter and opened up a grocery store, In 1869 he and John F. Betz formed Lembeck and Betz Eagle Brewing. Betz himself apprenticed with his brother-in-law, D.G. Yuengling, which is why he insisted on using the eagle as an homage to Yuengling. In 1889, Lembeck started producing lager beer in addition to the traditional pale ale they had been brewing. The brewery grew through the later part of the 19th century, eventually occupying seventeen city lots. The company was incorporated in May 1890. Since 1869, the brewery grew to become the fourth-largest brewery in New Jersey.

Lembeck died in 1904 and his sons Gustav and Otto took over running the brewery. The brewery closed during Prohibition. The facility was later sold and converted into a refrigeration plant. The area, designated as the Lembeck and Betz Eagle Brewing Company District, was added to the National Register of Historic Places on June 21, 1984, for its significance in architecture, economics, industry, and community planning and development. The brewery buildings were demolished in 1997.

== See also ==
- National Register of Historic Places listings in Hudson County, New Jersey
- List of defunct breweries in the United States
