= Triangle Brewing Company =

Coordinates: 35.9966°N 78.8893°W

- Location: Durham, North Carolina, USA
- Opened: 2007
- Owned by: Rick Tufts and Andy Miller

Other beers
Name	Type
Triangle Year-Round beers
Triangle Golden Ale	Belgian Strong Golden Ale
Triangle Xtra Pale Ale	American Pale Ale
Triangle Seasonal beers
Triangle White Ale	Belgian Wheat Ale/Witbier
Triangle Abbey Dubbel	Dubbel
Triangle Bourbon-aged Abbey Dubbel	Dubbel
Triangle Imperial Amber Ale	Double Red Ale
Triangle Stout	Stout
Triangle Mild Ale	British Mild Ale

Triangle Brewing Co. (TBC) was a microbrewery owned and operated entirely by business partners (and high-school friends) Rick "the Brewer" Tufts and Andy "the Bloke" Miller who, in 2005, resettled in Durham, North Carolina from Connecticut. Andy Miller had extensive local restaurant management experience, and Rick Tufts apprenticed at Flying Fish Brewing Company and was an avid homebrewer long before founding a new brewery. TBC began selling beer on July 4, 2007 and was the only microbrewery in Durham. The arrival of a microbrewery in Durham is arguably part of the current downtown art, building, and cultural Renaissance.

== About Triangle Beers ==
TBC did not plan to be cast as a Belgian style brewery when they developed their first beer, the Belgian Strong Golden Ale; rather, they wanted to enter the market with something notable and different. The goal of TBC was to produce balanced, full-flavored, yet highly drinkable Belgian and American style ales. TBC was distributed across North Carolina, primarily in the Triangle Area (Durham, Orange, and Wake Counties) but as far as Asheville and Charlotte. TBC did not pasteurize any of its beers. TBC also produced a small amount of cask ale in firkins for use at special events. TBC was one of the first NC breweries to offer its flagship beers in cans.

On April 30, 2016, Triangle closed due to operations issues and heavy competition from the growing North Carolina micro and craft brewing industry.

== List of beers ==
- Triangle Belgian-style Golden Ale is the TBC's flagship beer, and continues to be brewed year-round. It is 8% ABV, fermented at warmer temperatures than the other ales to further develop the significant yeast complexity, lightly filtered, and uses TBC's proprietary Belgian yeast strain.
- Triangle American-style Xtra Pale Ale is the TBC's second year-round beer, meant to be a session beer at 4.5%. It is a straw-colored, hoppy American craft brewery style of Pale Ale, using Washington grown Palisade, Centennial and Magnum hops. It uses the TBC's proprietary American yeast strain.
- Triangle Belgian-style White Ale is the TBC's Summer seasonal offering, a wheat beer that is totally unfiltered, made with white wheat, with limited use of hops and incorporating the traditional spices - orange peel and coriander. 5% ABV. It uses TBC's Belgian yeast.
- Triangle Belgian-style Abbey Dubbel is a seasonal offering of another complex, yeasty beer, at 7.2% ABV. The style is characterized by a large head, moderate maltiness, fruitiness, and warmth from the alcohol content. There has been a bourbon-barrel-aged version. It uses TBC's Belgian yeast.
- Triangle Imperial Amber is a heavily hopped Double Red ale, around 90 IBUs, and is 8.2%ABV. It uses very high amounts of malt to balance the very high level of bitterness, resulting in the high alcohol content as well. It uses TBC's American yeast.
- Triangle Stout is a winter seasonal in the Foreign Stout style using chocolate and other dark roasted malts, resulting in a deep ruby color appearing almost black, and flavor notes similar to coffee. It is 5.6%ABV. It uses TBC's American yeast.
- Triangle Mild Ale is a British-style seasonal using domestic and imported malts to get at the complex nutty flavor of the style, meant to be a session beer.

== See also ==
- Other breweries in North Carolina.
- Barrel-aged beer
- List of defunct breweries in the United States
