= The Beijing Center for Chinese Studies =

The Beijing Center for Chinese Studies (or TBC) was established by Fr. Ron Anton, SJ as a 501(c)(3) organization in 1998. Located in Beijing's Embassy District, TBC's mission is to promote mutual understanding between China and other cultures, while facilitating international academic opportunities for students, educators, and business professionals.

== About The Beijing Center (TBC) ==
The Beijing Center for Chinese Studies (TBC) provides a unique environment for students from all over the world to begin their engagement with China. Our mission is to promote mutual understanding between China and other cultures. What makes us unique is our placement in a long and storied tradition of Jesuit education, one that teaches us that true cultural engagement starts first with friendship.

Matteo Ricci, S.J. (利玛窦) came to Beijing in 1601. Similar to TBC students today, he and his companions studied the Chinese language and culture and used that knowledge to engage in the academic life of the day. Like our students today, these people were great adventurers and showed great courage, humility, and respect for what they found here. Ricci found a particularly close friendship with Xu Guangqi (徐光启), who taught him the Chinese way of life. In turn, Ricci shared his knowledge of the West. We seek to follow in these footsteps as we provide students with the supportive environment to start their own adventures in China.

We achieve our mission by offering an outstanding immersive semester abroad program, short-term programs tailored for your group’s best initial engagement with China, and a research library with over 27,000 volumes in English used by scholars not only in China, but from around the world. We achieve our mission with TBC’s professional and dedicated staff.

So whether you are a newcomer or an old China hand, the experiences TBC provides will change and challenge the way you think about China and in turn, change your life.

== Study Abroad in China for a Semester or Year ==
At TBC, students have the opportunity to study abroad for a semester or a full year, where they will have the chance to live on the campus of the Minzu University of China. Students can take English-taught courses and a Chinese language course appropriate for their proficiency. In addition, at the beginning of each semester, students have a 2-week long academic excursion trip – the Silk Road during fall and Yunnan Province in spring. These excursions teach students about the diverse cultures of China and offer the opportunity for personal and cultural growth.

== ChinaContact ==
The ChinaContact division runs faculty-led, short-term, non-credit programs year-round. These include programs for faculty members, university administrators—including university presidents—as well as workshops and courses for high school students, undergraduates, MBA groups, and graduate students in the humanities.

== Research Center ==
TBC Research Center specializes in supporting primary source research and helping young Chinese scholars in the doctoral or post-doc years. The center's scholar-in-residence helps TBC students with academic projects during their stay in Beijing.

== The Beijing Center Press ==
The Beijing Center Press specializes in publishing unique works on China-related topics, such as politics, philosophy, art, history, culture, religion, sciences, current affairs, etc. In partnership with Amazon's KDP, all TBC works are published and available online at amazon.com. TBC Press publishes works in both Chinese and English.

== The Anton Library ==
The Anton Library houses a collection of 27,000 volumes about Chinese life and society. Special collections include a small rare book collection of 17th century volumes that first revealed China to the West, a collection of approximately 3,000 older books from 1800 to 1949, and a multilingual collection on the history of the Catholic Church in China. The main collection of books about China written in English is the largest private such collection in Beijing and one of the largest in China.

=== "How The West Learned of China" collection ===
The TBC Library of Chinese Studies has obtained a few original copies of these works in its collection entitled: "How the West Learned of China". The collection dates from 1588 until 1840 (with a few later exceptions).

=== Historical collection ===
The collection has 1,200 books from the early 19th century to the founding of the People's Republic of China. Many books were published in the Qing Dynasty and some are considered rare or collector's items.

=== Christian History collection ===
This is a multilingual collection mainly of primary sources from around the world on early Christian history in China. Works here are in Chinese, Latin, Portuguese, Dutch, German, Spanish, French, etc. (not English). It contains the work of early Dominicans, Franciscans, Jesuits and others as well as works from the early local church in China.

== See also ==
- List of Jesuit sites
