= Menominee River Brewing Company =

Beer company in Menominee, MI, US (1886-1918)

The Menominee River Brewing Company was an American brewery that was located in Menominee, Michigan, from 1886 until 1918.

== History ==
In 1886, Anton Eichert (1839–1920) and John Skala (a.k.a. Skalla, 1847–1911) established a brewery called Eichert & Skala on Ogden Avenue (now 10th Avenue) in Menominee. After Eichert withdrew from the company on October 31, 1887, Skala then partnered with Wolfgang Reindl (1851–1935), and the name was changed to Skala & W. Reindl. The name was changed again in 1888 to the Menominee River Brewing Company. Wolfgang Reindl's son John Reindl (1873–1928) was the brewery's brewmaster.

=== Prohibition ===
The brewery brewed its last beer in early April 1918, and it closed on April 30, 1918, with the introduction of Prohibition in Michigan, which took effect on May 1, 1918. Simultaneously, the brewery merged with the Leisen and Henes Brewing Company of Menominee, creating the United Beverage Company. Franz Joseph "Frank" Erdlitz (1864–1937), who had been the secretary and treasurer of the Menominee River Brewing Company, served as the president of the United Beverage Company, and Wolfgang Reindl was the vice president of the company, which manufactured a near beer called Silver Cream. The brewery park was sold in 1919 and converted to agricultural use. The brewery plant was purchased by the Menominee Rule and Block Company in 1920, and the buildings were adapted to produce alphabet blocks, yardsticks, and other wooden products.

== Brands ==
- Dixie
- Dublin Stout
- Eagle Brew
- Family
- Golden Drop
- Export Beer
- Silver
- Silver Cream
- Standard

== See also ==
- List of defunct breweries in the United States
