= Reymann Brewing Company =

Defunct American brewery company

Coordinates: 40°03′50.9″N 80°42′38.5″W

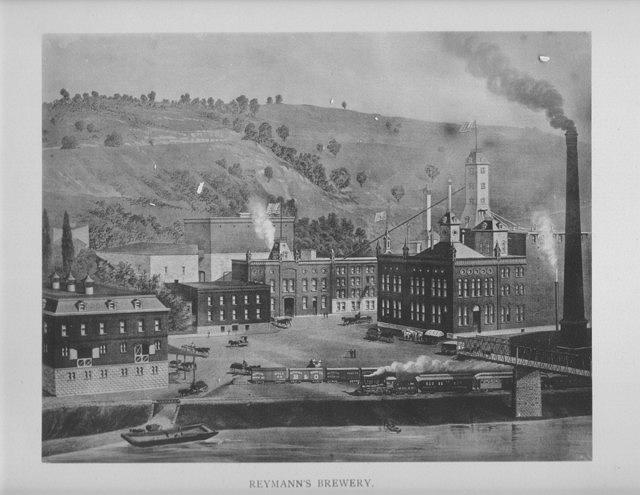
Reymann Brewing Company, 1889

The Reymann Brewing Company was a brewery in Wheeling, West Virginia. In the 1890s one cold storage room and saloon operated by Reymann Brewing was on land rented to the company by President William McKinley and his wife.

== See also ==
- List of historic sites in Ohio County, West Virginia
- List of defunct breweries in the United States
