= Tanzania Broadcasting Corporation =

State-run media organisation of Tanzania

Tanzanian Broadcasting Corporation (TBC)
- Type: Broadcast, satellite, television network
- Country: Tanzania
- Availability: North America, Europe, Asia and Africa
- Owner: Government of Tanzania
- Key people: Dr. Ayub Rioba Chacha, Director-General
- Launch date: 1 July 1951 (radio); 15 March 2000 (television)
- Official website: tbc.go.tz

The Tanzanian Broadcasting Corporation is a television network. It is Tanzania's national network and is government-owned and operated.

== History ==
Tanzania Broadcasting Corporation (TBC) is established under the Public Corporation Act, 1992 by an Establishment Order of 2007 published vide Government Note Number 186 of 2007 (The Tanzania Broadcasting Corporation (Shirika la Utangazaji Tanzania –TBC) (Establishment) Order, 2007). By this Order, signed by the President of the United Republic of Tanzania on 24 August 2007, the Tanzania Broadcasting Services (Taasisi ya Utangazaji Tanzania (TUT) (Establishment) Order, 2002) was revoked and then TUT ceased to exist.

TBC is a public broadcaster whose primary objective is to educate, entertain and provide information to the public. TBC is expected to fulfill its mandate through quality programming that is appealing to all citizens regardless of their ideology, race, religion, gender, class or physical disability. Since its establishment, TBC has built a relationship of trust with Tanzanians. The audience values the voice of TBC through its news and programs.

=== Historical milestones ===
Dar es Salaam broadcasting station (Sauti ya Dar es Salaam) - July 1951

- Later known as: Tanganyika Broadcasting Service
- Coverage: Dar es Salaam
- Colonial Development and Welfare Fund granted UKP 10,000 for the project
- Studio equipment: One gramophone turn-table, one microphone, a mixing panel made from old public address amplifier.
- Transmission: Started with one short-wave transmitter
- One standby medium-wave transmitter introduced on 10 March 1952
- Programs: Broadcast in Swahili for one hour three times a week

Tanganyika Broadcasting Corporation (TBC) - 1 July 1956

- Established by an Ordinance (Chapter 370 of the Laws Annual Supplement 1956)
- Objective: to provide public service broadcasting as a means of information, education and entertainment with the national interest of Tanganyika
- The government left programming to free judgment of the corporation.

Radio Tanzania - established 1 July 1965

- The board of the corporation was dissolved.
- The structure of the corporation was changed.
- It became part of the government's Ministry of Information and Tourism.

Radio Tanzania established 2 stations IN 1973

- Swahili service later called ‘Idhaa ya Taifa’ or the National Service
- English service
- External service

RTD expansion 1975-1988

- In 1975 commissioned three 50 kw relay stations at Mbeya, Arusha and Mwanza
- In 1988 commissioned two relay stations at Dodoma and Kigoma each with 100 kw and 10kw

RTD MW expansion IN 1990

- Songea and Nachingwea relay stations with 100kw and 10kw standby

Upcountry studios in 1991

- At Lindi, Dodoma, Songea and Kigoma

TV station built at audio visual institute – 1995

- Television ya Taifa (TVT) established under Prime Minister's Office – 1999
- TVT commissioned - October 1999
- Kisarawe TV transmitter station commissioned in 1999

Television Tanzania (also Television ya Taifa) started its broadcasts on 15 March 2000, after an experimental period that started in December 1999. In the initial phase it broadcast eight hours a day (4pm to midnight) in both English and Swahili languages, covering (in its first phase) Dar es Salaam, Tanga, Zanzibar, Pemba, Lindi, Mtwara and parts of Morogoro. The next step was to enable the channel to start satellite broadcasts.

Taasisi Ya Utangazaji Tanzania (TUT) established in 2002

- TUT started operating as a merger of RTD and TVT – July 2004
- 3 TV transmitter stations commissioned at Arusha, Dodoma and Mwanza in 2000
- Commissioned 7 TV analogue transmitter stations at Bukoba, Musoma, Tabora, Kigoma, Lindi, Tanga and Mbeya

Tanzania Broadcasting Corporation (TBC) formed in July 2007

- TBC Establishment Order signed by His Excellency the President of the United republic of Tanzania on 18 August 2007
- Singida TV and Radio transmitter stations commissioned in 2010
- 10 new FM radio transmitter stations established at Sumbawanga, Kilimanjaro, Shinyanga, Babati, Mpanda, Tunduru, Songea, Morogoro, Iringa and Masasi in 2010/2011

== Programming ==
Programming includes news and entertainment. TBC operates its television programs through three television profiles namely TBC 1, TBC 2 and newly established Tanzania Safari Channel (a wildlife channel). It also operates six radio stations, TBC Taifa, TBC FM, BONGO FM, TBC Arusha and TBC Dodoma in Swahili and TBC International in English.

== Stations ==
TBC broadcasts on three TV channels and four radio stations, TBC Taifa, Bongo FM, TBC International & Community Radios (though private television channels and radio stations also exist) and is also available via satellite and online.

== See also ==
- Communications in Tanzania
- List of Tanzania-related topics

== See also ==
- Official website
