= TBC 1 =

- Country: Tanzania
- Broadcast area: Tanzania
- Headquarters: Dar es Salaam

Programming
- Languages: Swahili and English
- Picture format: 576i SDTV

Ownership
- Owner: Tanzania Broadcasting Corporation

History
- Launched: 15 March 2000; 26 years ago
- Former names: TVT (2000-2007)

Links
- Website: tbc.go.tz

TBC 1 is the flagship television channel of the Tanzania Broadcasting Corporation. It started in 2000, several years after private television stations were established on the Tanzanian mainland. Broadcasting is primarily conducted in the Swahili language.

== History ==
Tanzania was a latecomer to television. The government of the time thought that radio was a priority and that introducing television to Tanzania would harm its cultural norms, similar to what had happened in South Africa when a national television service was being studied. Television was, however, introduced to Zanzibar on 12 January 1974, with the opening of ZBC TV. Television did however launch on the Tanzanian mainland in 1994, first with the Coastal Television Network, and later with ITV.

Plans to launch a television station on the Tanzanian mainland restarted in 1985, when the government established a Television Task Force, presided by the Director-General of the Tanzania Posts and Telecommunications Corporation FC Kasambala. The task force's final result, presented in October 1989, showed that the landscape was ready for a state television station, and that installation of the new technology would soon follow. The committee later found out that the establishing costs were prohibitive: for example, the early cost for a satellite connection was evaluated at US$1 billion. On 13 October 1989, the Business Times wrote that Tanzania could have television for an initial operating cost of US$7 million. Weeks later on 6 November, the then-Minister of Information and Broadcasting, Hassan Diria, named a Technical Consultative Committee for Television, led by Ambrose Ottaru. Later, on 12 April 1990, the committee presented its report to Diria. This report led to the establishment of strategies for the implementation of the Tanzanian government television station by the year 2000.

Test broadcasts of the channel, initially Televisheni ya Taifa (National Television) began in October 1999 (December 1999 according to some sources) and started official broadcasts on 15 March 2000. In an initial phase, TVT broadcast to Dar es Salaam (VHF channel 6), Zanzibar, Pemba, Lindi, Mtwara and part of Morogoro. The second phase was expected to be completed by the end of 2003, enabling total nationwide coverage for the network.

In 2002, TVT merged with Radio Tanzania Dar es Salaam, becoming a part of TBS, which was subsequently renamed TBC in 2007.

The channel was set to start digital broadcasts in 2010 after TBC signed a deal with Chinese company StarTimes. At the time, they had done the same with the Kenya Broadcasting Corporation and were on track to start their services in Rwanda. As of the second quarter of 2018, it was the fifth most watched channel in Tanzania per a Tanzania Media Management/GeoPoll survey with a share of 9,49%.
