= John F. Betz & Son Brewery =

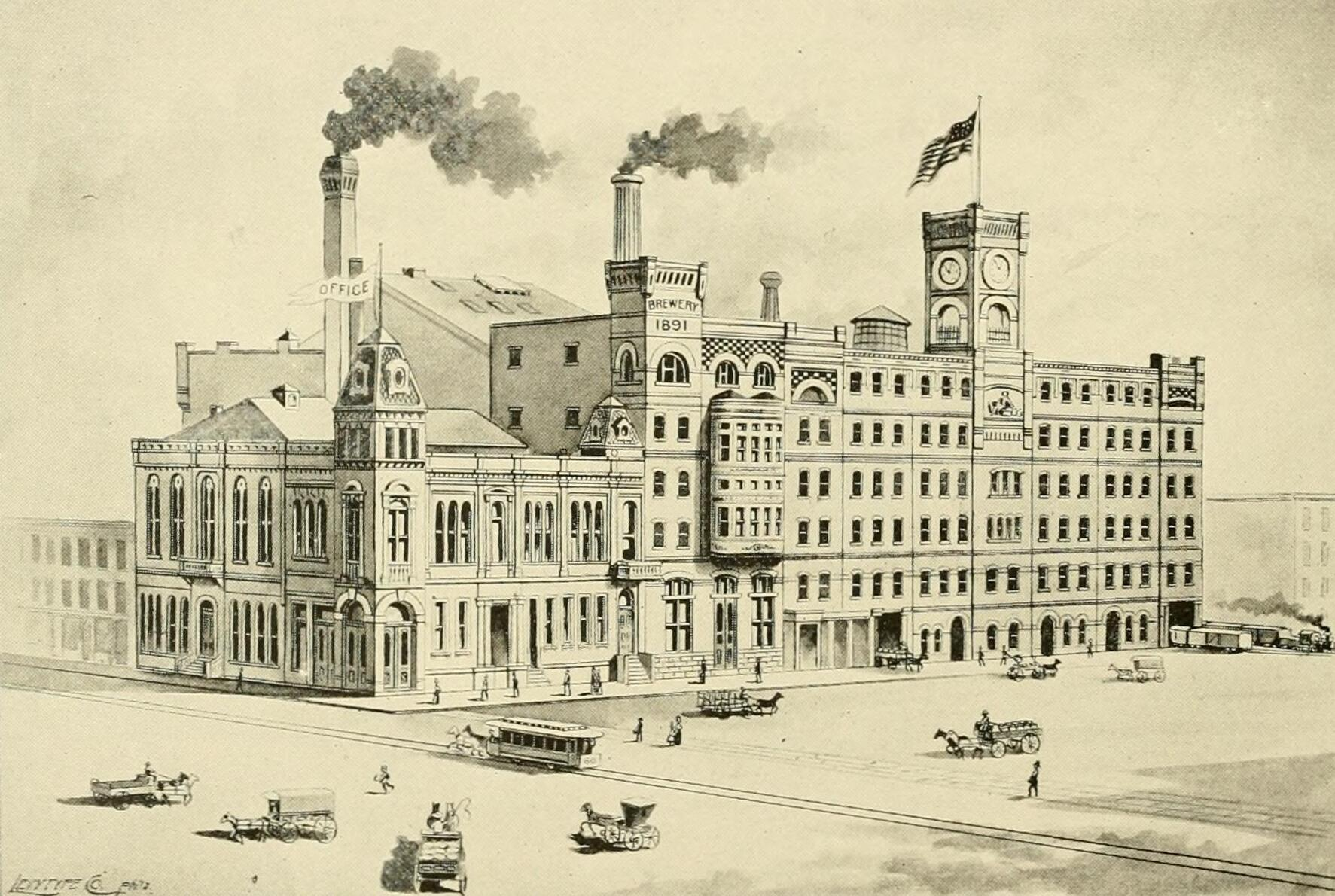
John F. Betz & Son Brewery

John F. Betz and Son, Inc. was a beer brewery in Philadelphia, founded in 1775 as the Robert Hare & J. Warren Peter Brewery, it closed in 1939. The brewery was located at 415 Callowhill, 5th & Lawrence Streets, Philadelphia, PA.

The name John F. Betz can refer to John F. Betz (Sr.), John F. Betz (Jr.), or John F. Betz III. John F. Betz Sr. gave his grandson John F. Betz III a brewery, named the Germania Brewery in Philadelphia, as a Christmas gift in 1907. John F. Betz Sr. was the brother-in-law of D.G. Yuengling, Jr., the founder of D.G. Yuengling & Sons Brewery.

Betz also started a brewery in Jersey City, New Jersey with Henry Lembeck named The Lembeck and Betz Eagle Brewing Company.

== Products ==
John F. Betz Brewery produced the following brands.

- Betz India Pale Ale 1933 - 1935
- India Pale Ale 1933 - 1935
- Betz Porter 1933 - 1939
- Betz Bock 1933 - 1939
- Betz Pilsener Beer 1933 - 1939
- Five Star Ale 1933 - 1939
- Old Stock Lager Beer 1933 - 1939
- Old German Beer 1934 - 1937

== See also ==
- List of defunct breweries in the United States
