= Littig Brothers/Mengel & Klindt/Eagle Brewery =

- Littig Brothers/Mengel & Klindt/ Eagle Brewery
- U.S. National Register of Historic Places
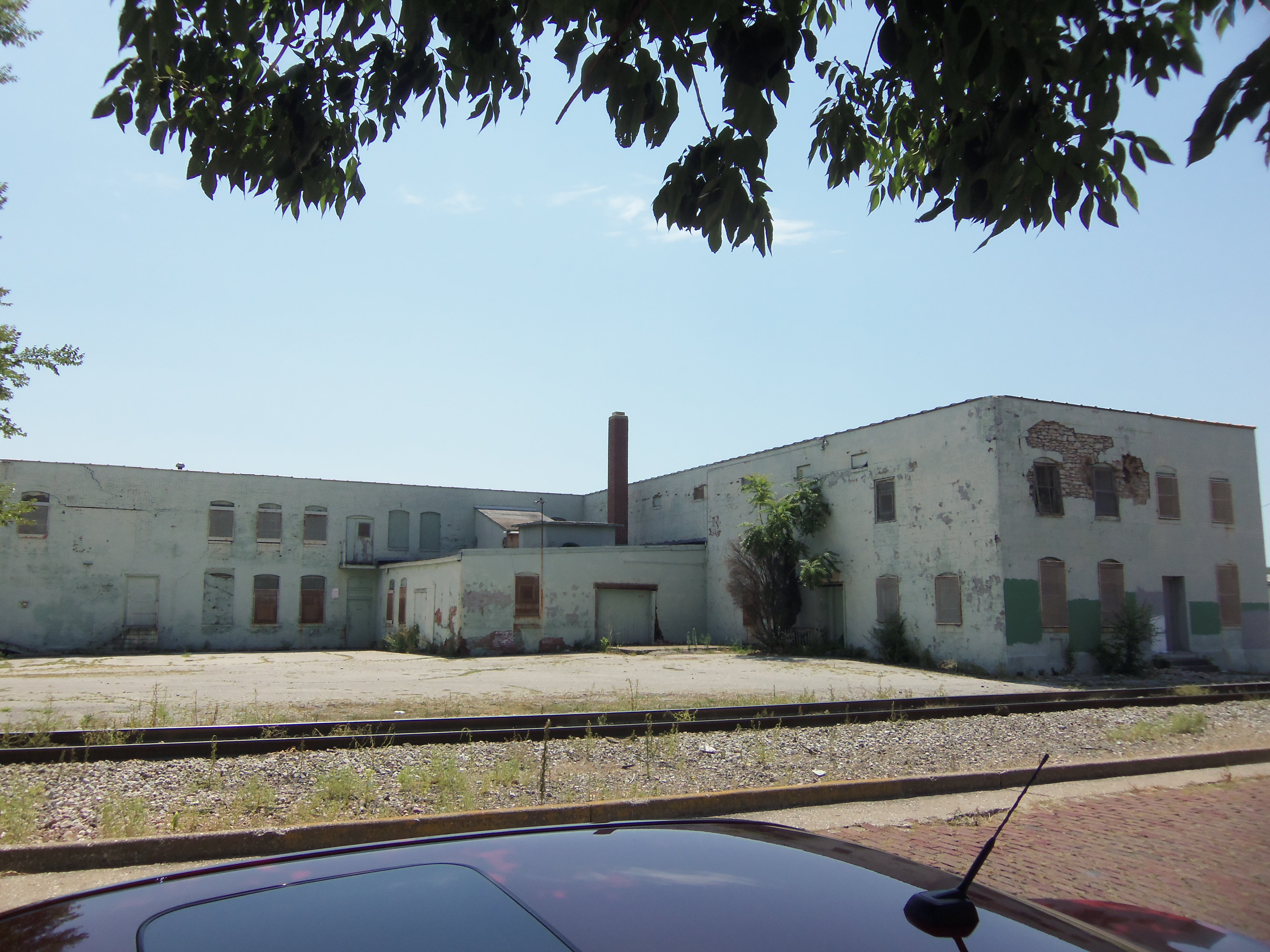
- View across the railroad tracks from W. 5th Street.

- Location within Iowa Location within the United States
- Location: 1235 W. 5th St. Davenport, Iowa
- Coordinates: 41°31′28″N 90°35′31″W
- Area: 1 acre (0.40 ha)
- Built: 1865
- MPS: Davenport MRA
- NRHP reference No.: 83002464
- Added to NRHP: July 7, 1983

Littig Brothers/Mengel & Klindt/Eagle Brewery is located in a residential and light industrial area of the west end of Davenport, Iowa, United States. It has been listed on the National Register of Historic Places since 1983.

== History ==
The beer brewing industry in Davenport got its start after large numbers of German immigrants arrived in Davenport in the 1850s. They brought both the demand and the knowledge needed for the breweries to develop and succeed in Davenport. Most of the operations in the city were small until after the American Civil War. Five large breweries were functioning in the city in the late 19th century: Mathias Frahm and Son, Koehler and Lange (also known as Arsenal Brewery), Littig Brothers (later Mengel and Klindt, then Eagle Brewery), Julius Lehrkind's Brewery and Zoeller Brothers. They all grew steadily between 1860 and 1890. They made $52,000 in 1860; $93,000 in 1870; $178,370 in 1880; and $832,700. Their distribution was mainly in the local area of Davenport, Rock Island, Illinois and Moline, Illinois.

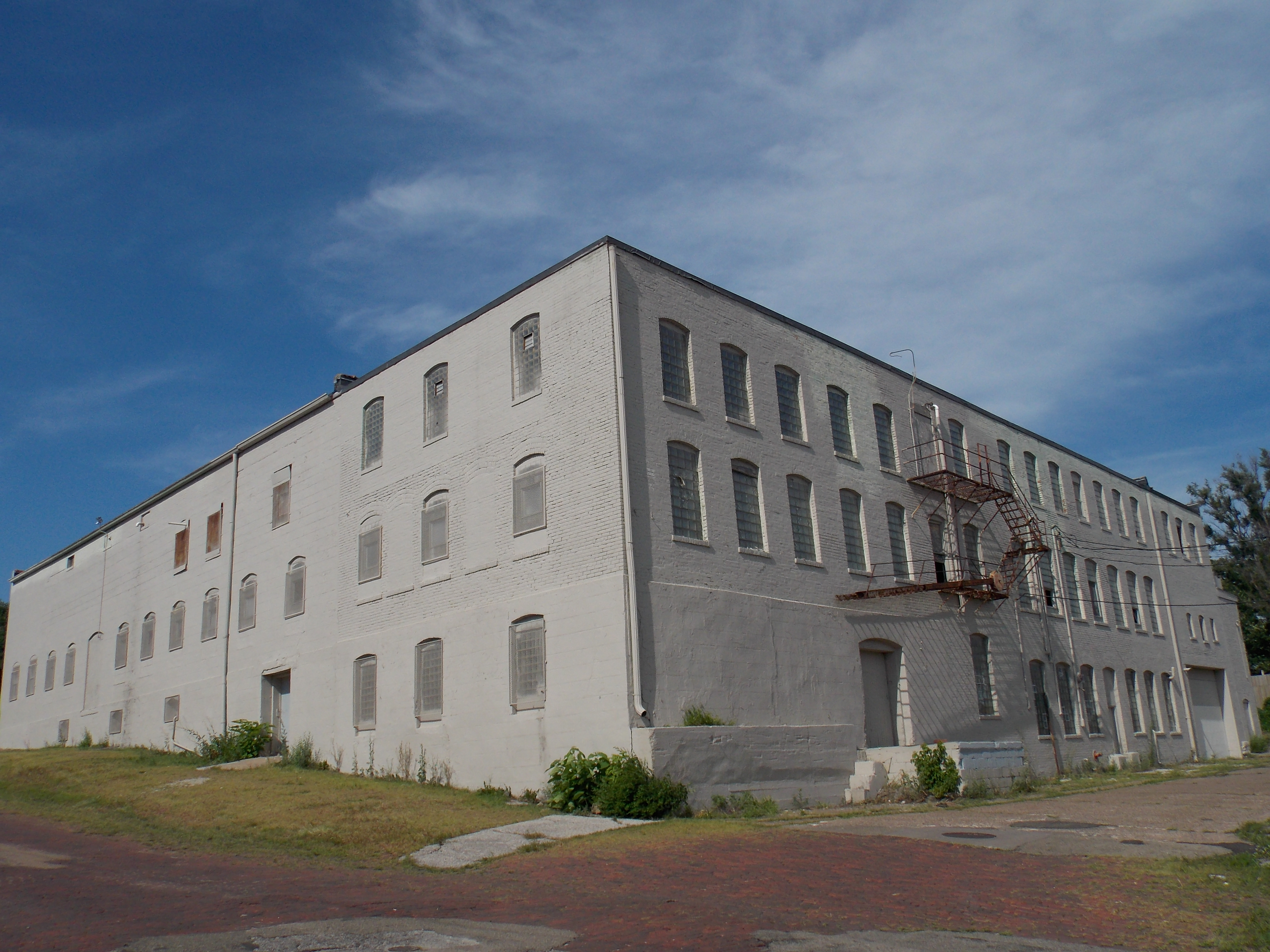
The backside of the building

Peter Littig opened a small brewery before the Civil War and by 1860 it employed six people and its annual output was $16,800. This building was constructed around 1865 and by 1870 the brewery's name had changed to Littig Brothers. During this same period, it was also known as Eagle Brewery. German immigrants George Mengel and Henry Klindt bought the operation in 1876. Before the turn of the 20th-century, it was known as Mengel & Klindt, Eagle Brewery, J. Lage & Co. and Lage, Mengel & Klindt.

In 1894 all the breweries consolidated into a single corporate structure called The Davenport Malting Company. They built a new building in the west end that contained some of the first refrigeration equipment used in the city. As they built new additions to the plant they closed the older structures. This building was used until about 1898. Davenport Malting Company was divided into two firms in 1904, Davenport Brewing Co. and Hawkeye Realty Co. Production reached a high of 75,000 barrels of beer by 1916, and was the second largest brewery in Iowa. It closed that year when national Prohibition became law.

This facility housed other industrial concerns over the years. In the early 20th century it was one of the locations for the Davenport Pearl Button Co.

== Architecture ==
The former brewery is a typical 19th-century industrial building and functional architecture. It is a three-story unadorned structure feature segmental arches and stone sills. The first floor, which is built into the side of a hill, is believed to be brick or stone that has subsequently been covered by concrete and stucco.

== See also ==
- List of defunct breweries in the United States
