= Genesee =

Genesee, derived from the Seneca word for "pleasant valley", may refer to:

== Geographic features ==
=== Canada ===
- Genesee, Alberta, an unincorporated community

=== United States ===
- Genesee, California
- Genesee, Colorado
- Genesee County, Michigan
- Genesee County, New York
- Genesee Falls, New York, a town
- Genesee, Idaho
- Genesee Theatre, Waukegan, Illinois
- Genesee, Lansing, Michigan, a neighborhood in Lansing, Michigan
- Genesee, Wisconsin, a town
  - Genesee Depot, Wisconsin, an unincorporated community
- Genesee, Seattle, a neighborhood in West Seattle, Washington
- Genesee Park (Seattle), a park in the Rainier Valley neighborhood of Seattle, Washington
- Genesee River, a river in north central Pennsylvania and western New York
- Genesee Township, Whiteside County, Illinois
- Genesee Township, Michigan
- Genesee Township, Potter County, Pennsylvania
- Genesee, New York, a town
- Genesee College, New York state
- Genesee Valley Greenway, a rail trail in western New York state
- Genesee Valley Park, New York

== Products and companies ==
- Genesee Brewing Company, a Rochester, New York, brewery
  - Genesee Cream Ale, one of the brewery's brands
- The Genesee Farmer, an agriculture and horticulture periodical established in 1831
- Genesee Country Village and Museum, a 19th-century living history museum located in New York
- Genesee and Wyoming Railroad, a railroad in western New York that operated from the 1890s to 2003
- Genesee Valley Canal Railroad, a railroad in western New York state in the U.S.
- Genesee Valley Transportation Company, parent company of multiple New York state and Pennsylvania short-line railroads
- Genesee & Wyoming, a railroad operating company based in Greenwich, Connecticut in the U.S.
- Genesee (automobile), a prototype car built in Batavia, New York in 1911

== Other uses ==
- Genesee (train), a named passenger train of the United States, operated by the New York Central Railroad
- Abbey of the Genesee, a Trappist monastic community in upstate New York.
- USS Genesee, several ships of the United States Navy

== People with the name and surname ==
- Bryan Genesse (born 1964), Canadian actor and martial artist
- Fred Genesee, Canadian psychologist and academic
- Paul Genesse (born 1973), American writer
- Genesse Ivonne Moreno, female gunman responsible for the Lakewood Church shooting

== See also ==
- Geneseo (disambiguation)
