= Portland Brewing Company =

Former American craft brewery

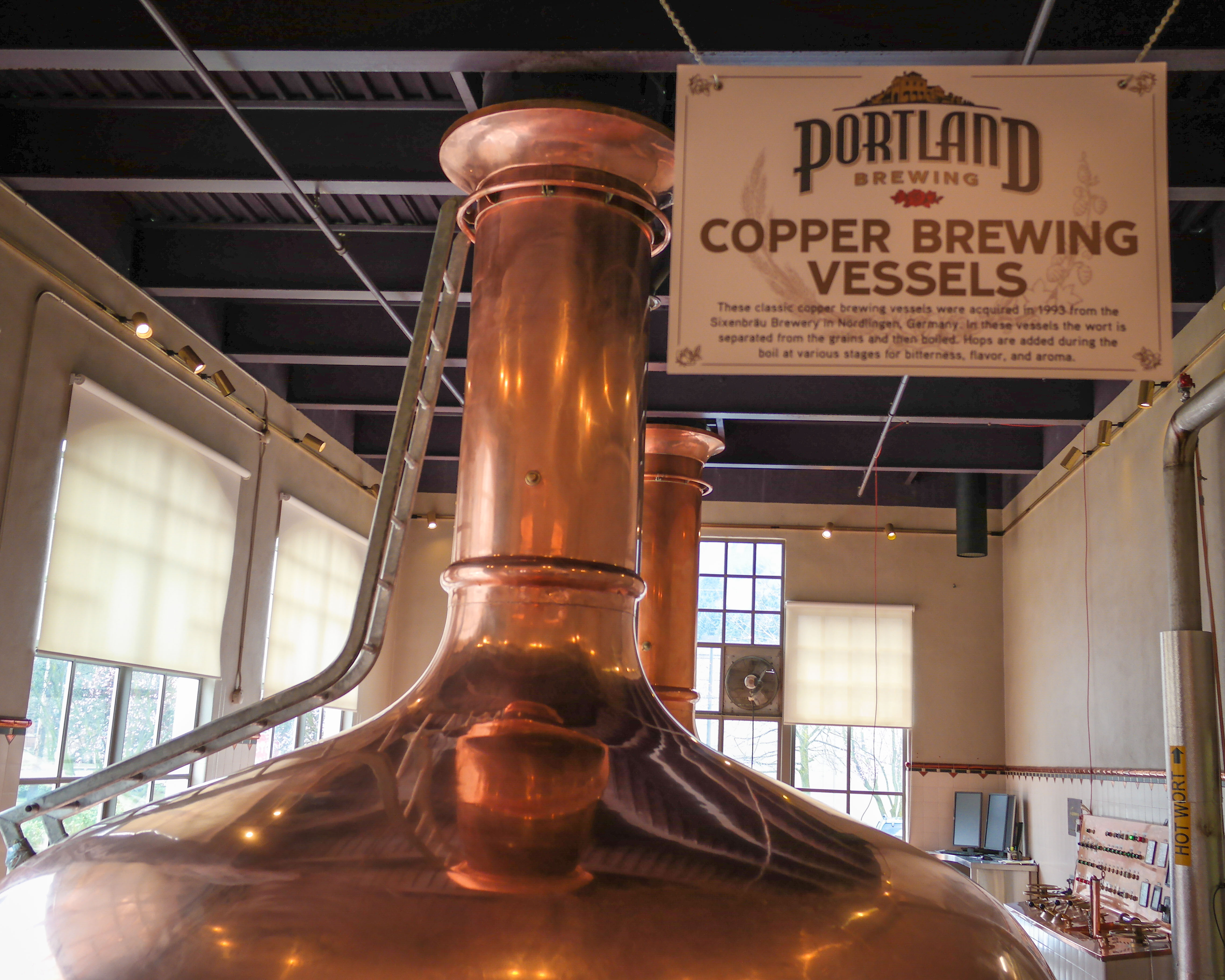
- Industry: Alcoholic beverage
- Founded: 1986
- Defunct: 2021
- Headquarters: Portland, Oregon; United States
- Products: Beer
- Owner: Florida Ice & Farm Co.

Portland Brewing Company was a brewery in Portland, Oregon. A pioneer in Portland's early craft brewing scene, it was known as MacTarnahan's Brewing Company from 2004 to 2013 before resuming its original name. It was closed by the Costa Rican company that owned it, Florida Ice & Farm Co., in early 2021.

== History ==
Portland Brewing Company was founded in 1986 by Fred Bowman, Art Larrance and Jim Goodwin; Shareholder Robert Malcolm "Mac" MacTarnahan invested $25,000 and was a major backer of the company. In 1992 the brewery named a beer in his honor, MacTarnahan’s Amber Ale, which quickly became their flagship. MacTarnahan rescued the company from financial straits in 1998 by buying $3.5 million in debt in exchange for stock; as a result Portland Brewing began using MacTarnahan's labeling. Portland Brewing Company merged with Saxer Brewing Company of Lake Oswego in 2000.

In 2004, MacTarnahan, then 88 years old, sold the company to Pyramid Breweries of Seattle. The Portland Brewing facility was renamed MacTarnahan's Brewing Company, and continued its operation and product line. MacTarnahan died later that year. In 2008 Pyramid itself was acquired by Magic Hat Brewing Company. This was subsequently bought by North American Breweries of Rochester, New York, in 2010 and by Costa Rican company Florida Ice & Farm Co. in 2012. In 2013 the brewery announced it would return to the Portland Brewing Company name.

On January 8, 2021, Portland Brewing Company announced that the brewery would cease all operations.

== Beers ==
Beers made by Portland Brewing have won many awards over the years, including gold medals at the Great American Beer Festival, gold, silver, and bronze medals at the World Beer Championships, and a silver medal at the world beer cup in 2016. Beers made by Portland Brewing include MacTarnahan's Amber Ale, Noble Scot Scottish style ale, and BlackWatch Cream Porter.

=== Governator Ale ===
Governator Ale
- Governator Ale product label
- Manufacturer: Portland Brewing Co.
- Introduced: 2004
- Style: Extra special bitter

Governator Ale was an American Extra special bitter made in 2004 to commemorate the election of Arnold Schwarzenegger as Governor of California. The product was discontinued shortly after its introduction in response to complaints from Schwarzenegger's attorneys.

Jerome Chicvara, then CEO of Portland Brewing Co., had the idea of producing beer as a "tribute" to Schwarzenegger, while joking with his children and their friends. The name 'Governator' is a popular humorous portmanteau alluding to the seeming disparity between Schwarzenegger's former signature role as the violent robotic Terminator character in the film franchise of that name on the one hand, and politician on the other. The CEO commented that unlike other novelty beers, it was designed as a quality product, not a "girl-man beer".

The Oregon brewery obtained federal approval for its liquor label (a requirement in the United States), produced 3,200 cases of 22-ounce bottles, and began distributing the beer to stores in the California market. The label, which identified the maker as the fictitious "Pumping Iron Brewing", was designed as a generic-looking male bodybuilder viewed from behind, without including Schwarzenegger's actual likeness. Nevertheless, Schwarzenegger's lawyers, who had been looking for unauthorized exploitation of what they considered the governor's right of publicity, objected and demanded that production cease. In response, the brewery, which had recently been purchased by Pyramid Breweries, Inc., stopped making the beer in early 2004.
