= Genesee Township =

Genesee Township may refer to the following places in the United States:

- Genesee Township, Whiteside County, Illinois
- Genesee Township, Michigan
- Genesee Township, Potter County, Pennsylvania

== See also ==
- Geneseo Township (disambiguation)
- Genesee (disambiguation)
