= Dundee Brewing Company =

Brewing company based in Rochester, New York

Coordinates: 43.1649°N 77.6152°W

- Industry: Alcoholic beverage
- Founded: 1994
- Headquarters: Rochester, NY; United States
- Products: Beer
- Owner: Genesee Brewing Company
- Website: dundeebeer.com

Dundee was a Rochester, New York–based brewing company that produced ales and lagers. It was part of the Genesee Brewing Company, owned by North American Breweries (now FIFCO USA ) which started marketing the brand's first lager in 1994 as J.W. Dundee's Honey Brown. Honey Brown quickly gained a good reputation and won awards, most notably the gold medal at the 2004 World Beer Cup.

The company produced one year-round craft beer, India Pale Ale, as well as eight craft beers available in seasonal variety packs: English-Style Ale, Kölsch-Style Ale, Pale Ale, Pale Bock, Pilsner, Porter and Stout.

The company also produced four seasonal craft beers: Irish Red Lager (Spring), Summer Shandy (Summer), Oktoberfest (Fall), Nut Brown Ale (Winter).

On October 29, 2020, Genesee Brewing announced the rebranding of Original Honey Brown Lager, their last product still bearing the J.W. Dundee brand, to Genesee Specialty.

== History ==
J.W. Dundee's Honey Brown Original Lager was first produced in 1994. The Company added Amber Lager and Pale ale in 2006 along with some seasonal selections. In 2008, the company re-branded all the "J.W. Dundee's" products as simply "Dundee Ales & Lagers", including Honey Brown.

In early 2010, under North American Breweries ownership, the company separated Honey Brown from the Dundee lineup and returned this product to "The Original Honey Brown Lager." New craft beer brands and seasonal selections were added to the Dundee Ales and Lagers family.

== Ales and lagers ==
=== Original Honey Brown Lager ===
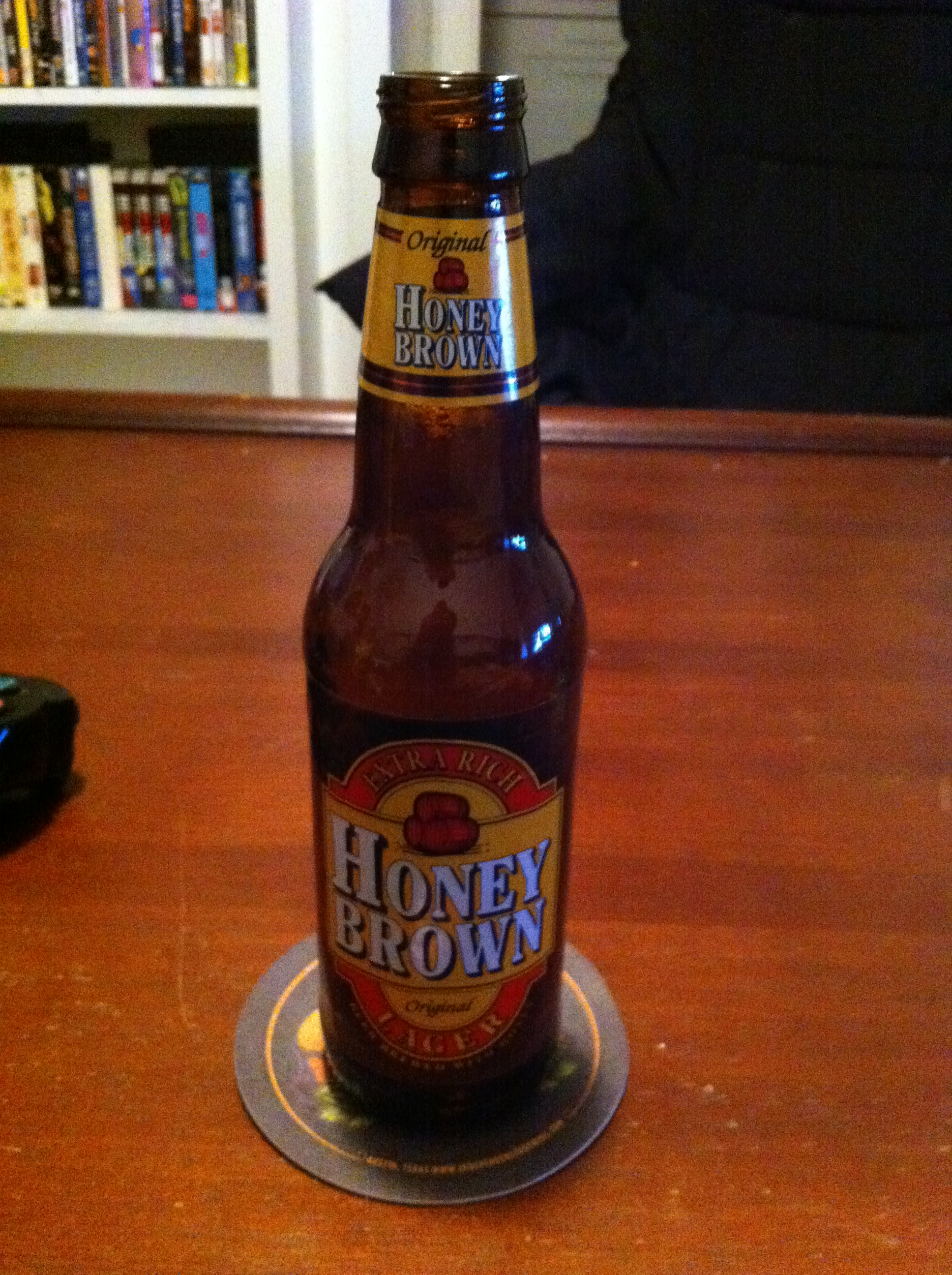
A bottle of Honey Brown Lager by the now-defunct Dundee Brewing Company, photo taken in 2012.

ABV: 4.5%, IBU: 10
Gold Award Winner of the 2004 World Beer Cup: Special Honey Lager or Ale Category, this lager is brewed with pure clover honey. It has a golden color and has a distinctive clover-like sweetness.

=== Dundee India Pale Ale ===
ABV: 6.3%, IBU: 60
An aggressively hopped ale with primary flavor characteristics of floral and citrus bitterness, contributed by the large amount of hops in the beer.

=== Dundee English-Style Ale ===
ABV: 5.1%, IBU: 15
An English-style ale with a malty, slightly sweet finish.

=== Dundee Kölsch-Style Ale ===
ABV: 5.1%, IBU: 10
A German-style ale from the Köln (Cologne) region of Germany. Malty and less hoppy with a golden color.

=== Dundee Pale Ale ===
ABV: 5.3%, IBU: 35
More towards the hoppy side, this ale has an amber hue and a citrusy aroma.

=== Dundee Pale Bock ===
ABV: 6.25%, IBU: 25
A traditional German lager Maibock Malty and less hoppy, with a hint of wheat and a light golden color.

=== Dundee Pilsner ===
ABV: 5.0%, IBU: 25
A traditional German-style pilsner.

=== Dundee Porter ===
ABV: 6.5%, IBU: 30
Dark-roasted grains give this ale a deep color, complementing a caramel taste.

=== Dundee Stout ===
ABV: 5.8%, IBU: 15. A stout with chocolate and coffee flavors.

=== Dundee Irish Red Lager ===
ABV: 5.0%, IBU: 25
(available January to March) An Irish-style red lager with a full body and a deep red color.

=== Dundee Summer Shandy ===
ABV: 4.2%, IBU: 9
(available April to July) A traditional German-style Radler with a lager base and crisp lemon flavor.

=== Dundee Oktoberfest ===
ABV: 5.5%, IBU: 17 (available August to October). A Märzen-style lager brewed in the German tradition. It has an amber color and a rich malt sweetness, distinguishing it from both lighter summer beers and stronger winter ales.

=== Dundee Nut Brown Ale ===
ABV: 5.3%, IBU: 24
(available November to December) A full-bodied Nut Brown Ale with a hint of hazelnut, caramel and chocolate malt, balanced by Willamette hops.
