= Fred Koch =

Fred Koch may refer to:

- Fred C. Koch (1900–1967), American petroleum engineer and entrepreneur, founder of Koch Industries
- Fred Conrad Koch (1876–1948), American biochemist and endocrinologist
- Frederick R. Koch (1933-2020), American collector and philanthropist
- Freddy Koch (1916–1980), Danish film actor
- Fred Koch Brewery, a New York brewery established in 1888

== See also ==
- Koch Foods, American food processing and distributing company founded by a different Fred Koch
- Koch (surname)
