= Fred Koch Brewery =

Former independent brewery in Dunkirk, New York

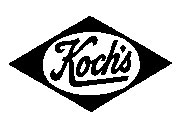
- Industry: Beverages
- Founded: 1888 (incorporated 1911), closed in 1985
- Headquarters: Dunkirk, New York, United States
- Key people: Fred Koch, Founder; Sons: William L. Koch, Fred C. Koch, Henry J. Koch
- Products: Beers, lagers, malt beverages

The original Fred Koch Brewery was a small, independent brewery in Dunkirk, New York, that produced beer and ale from late 1888 until 1985. Production peaked in the early 1950s with over 100,000 barrels brewed annually. When the Dunkirk, New York, brewery was closed in 1985, it was located at 15–25 West Courtney Street.

The Genesee Brewing Company currently owns the trademark rights to the name Fred Koch Brewery, but it is not producing any products under the Koch's name. Note added 9/1/18: A non-alcoholic beer "Penn's Best" is currently available and is labeled Fred Koch Brewing Co, Rochester NY.

The brewery was not connected to Jim Koch of Samuel Adams fame.

== Early years ==
Organized in the spring of 1888 by Fred Koch and Frank Werle as the Lake City Brewery, the company began its operation in the Fink brewery in the town of Dunkirk, New York. The first few months of operation were handled by just three men. Mr. Koch made sales and deliveries and Mr. Werle and one assistant ran the brewery. In the fall of 1888, the company built a new brewery on the old Newman tannery property on the corner of Ruggles and West Courtney streets in the city of Dunkirk, New York.

On May 8, 1896, a disastrous fire completely destroyed all but the brewery cellars. During the rebuilding process, Fred Koch purchased from Mr. Werle his interest in the business. The brewery was then owned and operated solely by the Koch family. The business was incorporated in April 1911 prior to the death of Fred Koch, who died while on a visit to Germany. After his death, his three sons, William L., Fred C., and Henry J. Koch, assumed management.

On September 24, 1915, Fire Chief John F. Meiers broke his leg, several firemen were injured, and eight horses burned to death in a fire at the Fred Koch brewing plant. The fire broke out in the horse barns on the southwest end of the plant in East Courtney Street and spread rapidity. A few weeks earlier, an incendiary fire broke out in the same part of the plant.

Products sold included "Bock Beer", "Wurtzburger" (an old-fashioned German brew), and "Lake City Export". The brewery continued to produce beer and ale until prohibition in 1920.

== Prohibition ==
Prohibition became effective January 16, 1920, and continued in the United States until December 5, 1933. During these years, the Fred Koch Beverage Company's principal business was soft drinks and made such licensed products as Ward's "Orange-Crush" (an orange drink), Welch's "Welch-ade" (a grape drink) and "Green River" (a lime drink). It also produced a small amount of "near-beer" called "Kobru", a beverage containing less than one-half of 1% of alcohol. "Kobru" was legal under the law, but was not favorably received by residents of Dunkirk, New York.

== 1930s – Post Prohibition ==
On April 17, 1933, following the repeal of prohibition, the Fred Koch Brewery received a permit to again produce beer and ale. After extensive repairs to the plant, Lake City Export beer was produced and made ready for sale on May 8, 1933. The first sale was made to Sam Spera, owner of the Peanut Cafe and consisted of 120 12-ounce bottles and a half barrel of beer. 550 cases of beer were sold in first hour alone. In the eight months of operation in 1933, the sales amounted to 19,870 barrels, which was at the time the largest volume in the history of the brewery.

Brands introduced after prohibition included Pale Lager Beer, Deer Run Ale, and Koch's Bock Beer. And, in 1938, Koch's Golden Anniversary Beer was introduced commemorating the 50th anniversary of the brewery. Initially, the product was intended for that year only. Due to popular demand, it was decided that Koch's Golden Anniversary Beer would be manufactured on an ongoing, regular basis.

== 1940s – War years ==
During the war years, material used to make bottle caps were in short supply. Due to this, patrons were encouraged to drink Koch's at their favorite tavern and not by the bottle. In March 1946, because of material shortages and out of consideration for the ill-fed people of war torn Europe, the Fred Koch Brewery announced that it would discontinue brewing "Golden Anniversary" beer. "When supply is back to normal, production of "Golden Annie" will resume," the company reassured. By April of 1946, the brewery had to ration its products and was closed on Wednesdays.

But by 1948, the brewery was back to full capacity and employing 70 men and women and producing more than 70,000 barrels of beer and ale.

== 1950s – Golden years ==
In 1951, "Pik-A-Pak," a six bottle carton carrying case was introduced and made available to local grocers and taverns. In 1952, production amounted to 102,000 barrels.

In 1954, the advertising campaign "The word's getting around...Koch's tastes better" was launched. Newspapers, radio, outdoor billboard's, and store displays carry the message to beer drinkers in Dunkirk and throughout Western New York and Northwestern Pennsylvania.

In 1955, the brewery launched an aggressive sales campaign in western New York. In May of that year, a giant outdoor display, referred to in the trade as a "spectacular," was erected on Delaware Avenue in the town of Tonawanda, NY. The sign featured an 18-foot plastic bottle which rotated on a turntable.

By 1958, the 70th anniversary of the brewery, Koch's annual output was over 88,000 barrels of beer and ale. The brewery had 10 distributors to supply customers in western New York and northwestern Pennsylvania. The main products sold in the 1950s included Koch's Golden Anniversary, Koch's Lager, Deer Run Pale Ale and Koch's "Kookie" Pilsener.

== 1960s – Black Horse ==
In 1961, the Fred Koch Brewery contracted with Diamond Spring Brewery of Lawrence, Massachusetts to brew the Black Horse Ale brand. (The Metropolis Brewing Company in Trenton, New Jersey also purchased a license from Diamond Springs to brew an ale under the Black Horse name.) The ale had a slightly higher alcohol content than most domestic and imported ales of the time and was sold at a premium price.

In 1964, a disposable, one-gallon can of Koch's genuine draft beer called "Tap-A-Keg" was introduced. The Tap-A-Keg and accompanying Home Tapper unit were introduced by the Atlantic Brewing company of Chicago, Illinois.

In 1965, a Gold Medal for Quality from Monde Selection in Brussels was awarded to the brewery. In the 1965 crown and label contest of the Brewers Association of America, Black Horse Ale won first place in the crown contest, and second place in the paper label.

Koch's Light Lager Beer received the Brussels Gold Medal for Quality in both 1968 and 1969.

== 1970s – Consolidations ==
On November 3, 1971, the Fred Koch Brewery purchased the Dominion Distributors Inc. of Buffalo, New York.

On December 1, 1971, it was announced that the William Simon Brewery of Buffalo, New York granted to the Fred Koch Brewery a temporary non-exclusive franchise to brew and market Simon Pure beer and ale. The temporary agreement was voided in June 1972 when the William Simon Brewery filed for bankruptcy. A second temporary agreement was entered in which Koch's brewed and sold Simon Pure and Old Abbey and paid the stockholder of the William Simon Brewery for the privilege of using its trademarks, copyrights and name. This second temporary agreement was formalized in 1974.

On August 11, 1972, the Fred Koch subsidiary Dominion Distributors Inc. agreed to purchase Iroquois Brewing Distribution, a division of Iroquois Industries, Inc.

In 1978, the Fred Koch Brewery ("The Tiny Little Brewery Where Real Beer Is Made") was the nation's second smallest brewer, holding only five-tenths of 1 percent of the American beer market. Despite attempts to diversify by producing well-known regional brands including Koch's, Black Horse, Deer Run, Simon Pure, Iroquois, Phoenix, Bavarian's Select, and a generic variety for sale in supermarkets, the brewery struggled.

== 1980s – Sold again and again ==
In 1981, the Fred Koch Brewery was purchased by the Vaux Breweries of Sunderland, England. Vaux expressed confidence planning on a 30 percent expansion of the brewery's 30,000-barrel annual capacity. In 1983, the book "Gourmet Guide to Beer" ranked Koch's Golden Anniversary Beer number one among 140 American-brewed pale lagers. And its Jubilee Porter, made to celebrate the 50th anniversary of the end of Prohibition, was also well received. In 1984, as a St. Patrick's Day promotion, the brewery distributed green colored beer. The novelty shipment was a sell-out.

After just 3 years, Vaux Breweries sold the Fred Koch Brewery to the Genesee Brewing Company. After the sale, Genesee would continue to produce Koch's Golden Anniversary Beer and Black Horse Ale. Genesee found some success with the Koch's line. Koch's Golden Anniversary Beer won a gold medal at the Great American Beer Festival in 1987. And Black Horse Ale won a gold medal at the 1988 Great American Beer Festival.

As earnings continued to fall in the face of industry consolidation, Genesee began looking for new ways to cut costs. The brewery located in Dunkirk was closed and all production of the Koch's brand was made in Rochester, NY.

In 1988, the former Fred Koch Brewery buildings on West Courtney Street in Dunkirk, New York were converted from a brewery to an incubator for nurturing new businesses.

== Genesee years – 1990 on ==
By the early 1990s, production of most of the Fred Koch brands had been discontinued. But in response to distributor and consumer interest, the Genesee Brewing Company expanded distribution of Koch's Golden Anniversary beer and introduced Koch's Golden Anniversary Light. In November 1994, to capitalize on the "ice" beer craze, Koch's Golden Anniversary Ice Beer was released.

In the mid-1990s, a portion of the original Fred Koch Brewery on West Courtney St. in Dunkirk, New York was demolished.

In the 2000s, Koch's Golden Anniversary Beer (plus Light and Ice) were the only products made by the Genesee Brewing Company under the "Fred Koch Brewery" name. They were all low-cost, value sector beers.

== See also ==
- List of defunct breweries in the United States

== Sources ==
- Dunkirk Evening Observer, Dunkirk-Fredonia, New York
- Fulton History
- Genesee Beer
- Great American Beer Festival
