= Geneseo Township =

Geneseo Township may refer to:

- Geneseo Township, Henry County, Illinois
- Geneseo Township, Cerro Gordo County, Iowa
- Geneseo Township, Tama County, Iowa
- Geneseo Township, Roberts County, South Dakota, in Roberts County, South Dakota

== See also ==
- Genesee Township (disambiguation)
