= Pyramid Breweries =

American brewery headquartered in Rochester, NY

Pyramid Breweries, Inc.

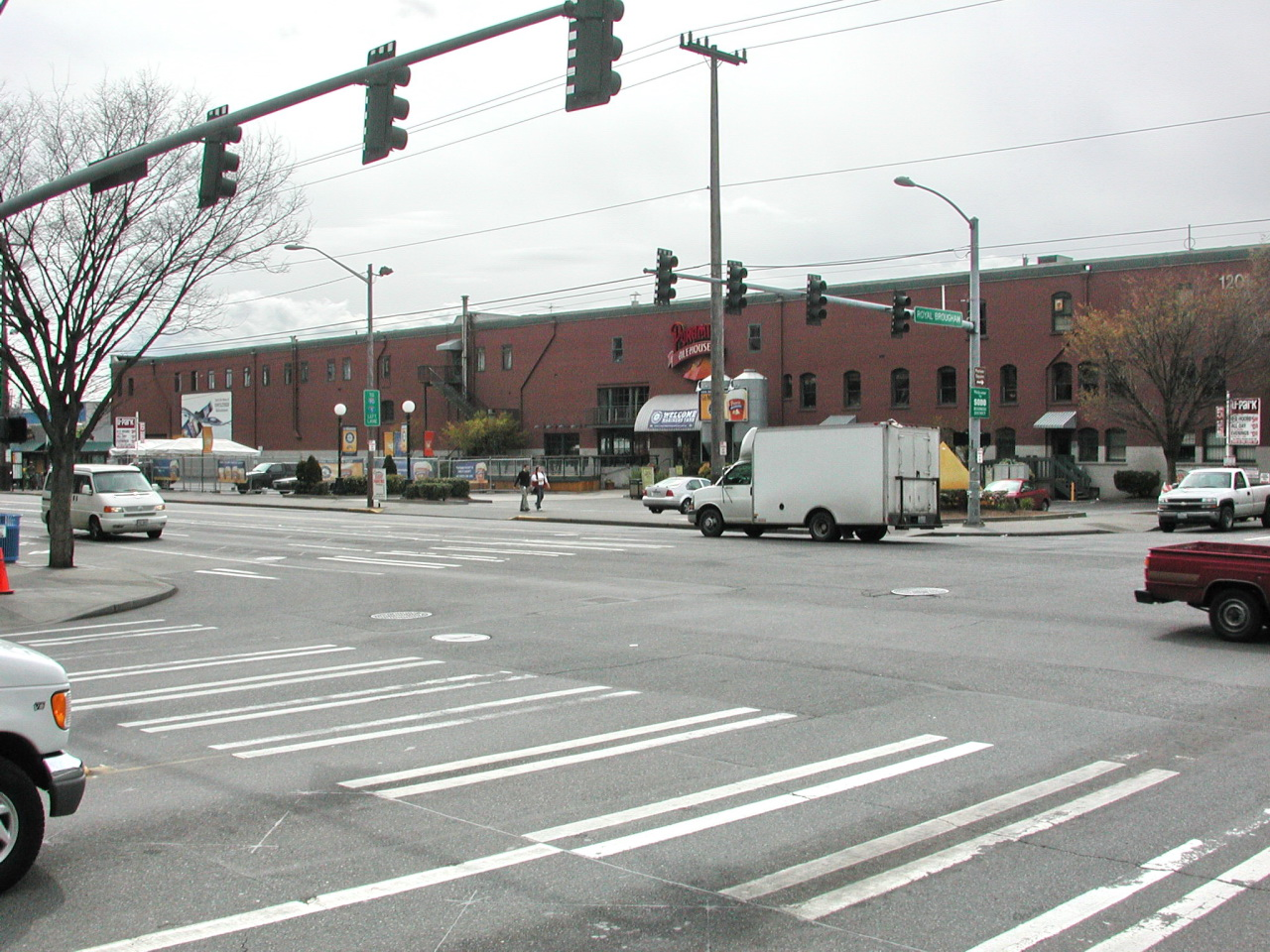
- Brewery and Alehouse in SoDo, 2007
- Formerly: Hart Brewing
- Industry: Alcoholic beverage; Restaurant
- Founded: 1984
- Founder: Beth Hartwell
- Headquarters: Seattle, Washington, United States
- Number of locations: 5
- Products: Beer
- Owner: Florida Ice & Farm Co.
- Divisions: Portland Brewing Company
- Website: http://www.pyramidbrew.com

Pyramid Breweries, Inc., is a defunct brewing company that produced beer under the Pyramid brand name at two breweries and several brewpubs in Washington, Oregon, and California. It was founded in 1984 as Hart Brewing. The brand name is currently owned by North American Breweries, a subsidiary of the Costa Rican company Florida Ice & Farm Co.

== History ==
Hart Brewing was founded by Tom Baune and Beth Hartwell in 1984 in Kalama, Washington. A pioneer of craft brewing in the Pacific Northwest, Hart's signature beer was Pyramid Pale Ale, which it followed with Pyramid Wheaten Ale in 1985. In 1994, Hart debuted the Apricot Ale, a fruit beer that quickly became its most prominent brand. The company opened new facilities and greatly expanded its production, and changed its name to Pyramid Breweries in 1996. It also started experimenting with other styles, which won a number of brewing competitions in the U.S. and abroad. Eventually it grew to become one of the five largest craft brewers in the country.

Pyramid eventually stopped brewing in Kalama in favor of other locations, but maintained its headquarters in Seattle. In 2004, Pyramid acquired Portland Brewing Company, makers of the MacTarnahan's brand. In 2008, the company was itself purchased by Independent Brewers United, the parent company of Magic Hat Brewing Company of Burlington, Vermont. Magic Hat maintained the Seattle office and the Pyramid and MacTarnahan's facilities and products. Two years later, the joint company was acquired by North American Breweries of Rochester, New York. In December 2012, the parent company was purchased by Cerveceria Costa Rica, a unit of the Costa Rican company Florida Ice & Farm Co.

== Beers ==
Pyramid once featured beers including, ales, lager, weizens, ciders, porters, and IPAs. The company offered six year-round beers, including Hefeweizen, Apricot Ale, Thunderhead IPA and Outburst Imperial IPA. Pyramid also offered seasonal beers, including Curve Ball Blonde Ale, Oktoberfest and Snow Cap Winter Warmer, along with seasonal variety packs and limited release beers.

== Facilities, alehouses, and closures ==
Pyramid ran three brewpub restaurants dubbed "Alehouses": one near the brewery, one in Seattle, and a small outlet in the Oakland International Airport. The Alehouse in Sacramento, California, closed its doors in March 2013, the Berkeley location closed in 2015, and the Walnut Creek location closed in early 2016. In 2019, the Seattle Alehouse settled a class action lawsuit for $450,000 over unpaid hours and wage theft. Less than a year later, on May 1, 2020, Pyramid Alehouse announced it was permanently closing the Seattle location, citing a lack of “high volume sporting and entertainment events” in the wake of the Covid-19 Pandemic that, before, would “off-set the much slower restaurant business during non-peak times.” On January 8, 2021, Portland Brewing Company announced that the brewery would cease all operations.
