= Magic Hat Brewing Company =

American brewery founded in Burlington, VT

- Opened: 1994
- Key people: Alan Newman
- Annual production volume: 154,236 US beer barrels (180,992 hl)
- Owned by: Florida Ice & Farm Co.
- Website: magichat.net

Magic Hat Brewing Company is a wholly owned brand of Florida Ice & Farm Co., which is headquartered in Costa Rica. It began production as an independent craft brewer in South Burlington, Vermont in 1994, and the brand is distributed across the United States. Their flagship beer, the apricot-tinged #9, is widely regarded as a significant early force in introducing many Americans to craft beer, especially in the late 1990s and early 2000s.

== History ==
Magic Hat Brewing Company was formed in 1994 in Burlington, Vermont by serial entrepreneur Alan Newman and Bob Johnson, the company's original brewmaster. It expanded and moved to an industrial park in neighboring South Burlington in 1997. By 2005 it had 64 employees. In 2008 the company purchased Pyramid Breweries, makers of the Pyramid and MacTarnahan's brands, expanding to 129 employees.

=== Acquisitions and eventual shutdown of Vermont space ===
In 2010, Alan Newman sold Magic Hat and all of its assets to North American Breweries, a subsidiary of KPS Capital Partners, a private equity firm with a business model described by Newman as "stripping out expense and flipping." The new owners did exactly that: in December 2012, North American Breweries was purchased by Florida Ice & Farm Company (FIFCO), a Costa Rican food and beverages company.

FIFCO soon began producing some Magic Hat beer at their Genesee Brewing Company plant in Rochester, New York. The Vermont brewery continued to operate until June 2020, when FIFCO announced that it intended to consolidate the rest of Magic Hat's brewing operations to the Rochester location. Another Burlington based brewery, Zero Gravity, assumed the lease on Magic Hat's physical plant, along with the brewing and retail assets within the space. 43 of Magic Hat's 46 Vermont employees were laid off, although Zero Gravity was in talks to rehire some of them. Zero Gravity moved into the space and began producing beer there in July 2020.

== Brands ==
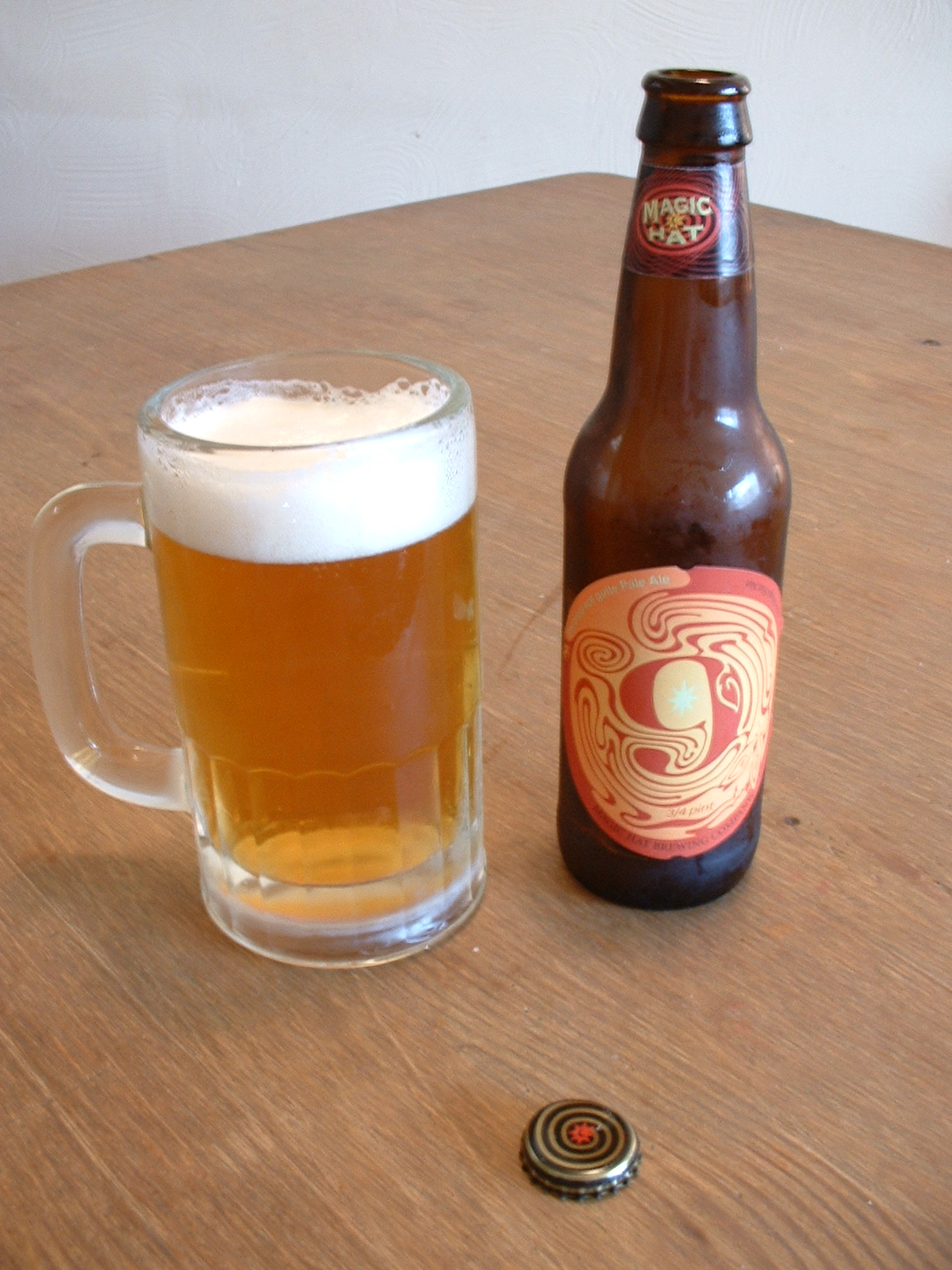
Magic Hat #9 in a mug

Magic Hat brews five year-round beers: #9 "Not Quite Pale Ale", Taken for Granite, Mother Lager, Citrus Boy, Ob-La-Di, What's on Stage, Nirav, Elder Betty and Single Chair. It also produces up to four seasonal beers, seasonal variety packs and several limited release products.
