= Genesee, California =

Unincorporated community in California, United States

Genesee
- Unincorporated community
- Location in California Genesee (the United States)
- Coordinates: 40°02′35″N 120°45′14″W
- Country: United States
- State: California
- County: Plumas
- Elevation: 3,701 ft (1,128 m)

Genesee (formerly Geneseo) is an unincorporated community in Plumas County, California, United States. It lies at an elevation of 3701 feet (1128 m). Genesee is located 5 miles (8.0 km) east-southeast of Taylorsville. It is named after one of several places in New York named Genesee or Geneseo.

The Geneseo post office operated from 1865 to 1868, and again from 1880 to 1940.

Local legends sometimes use Genesee as a location for ghost stories.
