= Geneseo =

Geneseo is the name of several places in the United States:

- Genesee, California, formerly Geneseo
- Geneseo, New York
  - Geneseo (village), New York
  - State University of New York at Geneseo
- Geneseo, Illinois
- Geneseo, Kansas
- Geneseo, North Dakota, in Sargent County, North Dakota

== See also ==
- Genesee (disambiguation)
