= USS Genesee =

USS Genesee may refer to the following ships of the United States Navy:

- USS Genesee (1862), launched 2 April 1862 by the Boston Navy Yard
- USS Genesee (AT-55), built in 1905 by the Maryland Steel Co., Sparrow's Point, Maryland
- USS Genesee (AOG-8), launched 23 September 1943 by Cargill, Inc., Savage, Minnesota
