= Florida Ice and Farm Company =

Costa Rican food and beverage corporation

Florida Ice and Farm Company S.A.
- Company type: Subsidiary
- Industry: Beverages, Brewing
- Founded: 1908
- Headquarters: Heredia, Costa Rica
- Key people: Ramón Mendiola Sánchez (CEO); Wilhelm Steinvorth Herrera (chairman)
- Products: Beers, soft drinks, canned goods
- Revenue: US$1.13 billion (2015-2016)
- Net income: US$ 174 million (2015-2016)
- Number of employees: +6,300 (2015)
- Parent: Heineken N.V.
- Website: www.fifco.com

Florida Ice and Farm Company S.A. (abbreviated as FIFCO) is a Costa Rican food and beverages company headquartered in the province of Heredia, Costa Rica. It has a catalog of over 2000 products, sold in over 15 countries.

FIFCO is structured as a holding company with three subsidiaries: Florida Bebidas (food and beverages), Florida Capitales (investments in bottling facilities), and Florida Inmobiliaria (investments in resort hotels).

== History ==
In 1908, the Lindo Brothers of Jamaican origin, founded a company in Siquirres, the third canton in the province of Limón, one of seven provinces in Costa Rica. The newly formed company was dedicated to agriculture and the making of ice. The finca (property) in which the company was located was called "La Florida", from which the company took its name of "Florida Ice and Farm Company". The brothers used an English name due to the fact that English was their native language, as it was for many Caribbean migrants who lived in the Atlantic region of Costa Rica. With that same company, they purchased the brewery and beverages business owned by José Traube in 1912. This is how a company that was mainly an agricultural concern entered the beverages market.

In 1958, the company purchased Cervecería Ortega. Founded in 1910 by the Ortega Family of Spanish origin, the Ortega brewery had been one of the main competitors with brands such as Imperial and Bavaria. The consolidation of these breweries allowed FIFCO to make investments in a new brewery and bottling plant which it called “Cervecería Costa Rica” in 1966. The plant is located in Río Segundo de Alajuela.

In 1979 the company went public and commenced trading on the Bolsa Nacional de Valores (the Costa Rican National Stock Exchange).

In 1995 FIFCO introduced the "Rock Ice" beer to the local market, which highlighted the innovative use of "ice brewing". In 1998 the company acquired “Cervecería Tropical”. In 2001, the company introduced its line of fruit refreshments "Tropical", and also began distributing the Tampico brand locally.

In 2006 the company purchased Industrias Alimenticias Kern's y Compañía S.C.A. for $86 million. The move further diversified its operations and brought along with it the canned beans, sauces, and pasta products under the Kern's and Ducal brands.

In 2007, FIFCO purchased the operations of SAB Miller in Costa Rica for US$116 million. The purchase included the distribution rights for Pepsi Cola in the country, as well as some real estate investments.

In 2008 after two years of the opening of political relationships between China and Costa Rica, the company signed a contract with Tsingtao that allowed it to start exporting its beer and refreshments into China, as well as importing Chinese beverages into Costa Rica.

In 2011 FIFCO purchased Corporación Musmanni, a large bakery chain in Costa Rica with franchisees in Central America and the Caribbean. In March 2012 the company entered the dairy market with the purchase of Coopeleche R.L.; the move put pressure on Cooperativa de Productores de Leche R.L. (Dos Pinos) which has dominated the Costa Rican dairy market for years.

In October 2012 FIFCO purchased North American Breweries Holdings (NAB) from KPS Capital Partners, for US$388 million through its subsidiary Cervecería Costa Rica S. A. NAB sells Genesee and Labatt beer in the United States, as well as craft or small batch beers including Magic Hat and Pyramid.

Under contract FIFCO brews Heineken beer at its facility at La Ribera de Belen.

In 2015, FIFCO obtained the essential COSTA RICA country brand.

== See also ==
- List of ice companies
