= Genesee Cream Ale =

Cream ale made by the Genesee Brewing Company in Rochester, New York

12 oz. can of Genesee Cream Ale

Genesee Cream Ale is a cream ale produced by the Genesee Brewing Company in Rochester, New York. Introduced in 1960, Cream Ale receives the extra step of kräusening, a process in which finished beer is primed for carbonation with wort instead of sugar.

Genesee Cream Ale won gold medals in 1990 and 1991, silver medals in 1987, 1988, 1993, 1994 and 2005, and bronze medals in 1995, 2002, and 2004 at the Great American Beer Festival.
