= Genesee Country Village and Museum =

Coordinates: 42°59′33.59″N 77°52′48.43″W

- Established: 1976
- Location: Wheatland, New York (in the hamlet of Mumford)
- Type: 19th-century living history museum
- Directors: Becky Wehle, President and CEO (Granddaughter of John L. Wehle)
- Curators: Peter Wisbey, Curator of Collections
- Website: www.gcv.org

The Genesee Country Village and Museum is a 19th-century living history museum covering more than 600 acres (2.4 km^{2}) located in the town of Wheatland, New York, United States, in the small hamlet of Mumford, about 20 miles (32 km) from Rochester. On the museum property is the 19th-century village (the Historic Village), the John L. Wehle Gallery of Sporting Art, the Genesee Country Nature Center, the Carriage Museum, the Silver Baseball Park and the Heirloom Gardens. The facility offers special events and classes throughout the year.

== Origin ==
The Genesee Country Village and Museum was conceived and founded by John (Jack) L. Wehle in 1966. He was the son of Genesee Brewing Company founder Louis Wehle and had been president of the company since 1945. As a collector of art, he recognized that another art form, the work of regional carpenters, master builders, and housewrights, was fast disappearing from the landscape. The proposed museum was to be a village of selected examples of 19th-century Genesee Country architecture that demonstrated not only form, but also function. The buildings would be showcases of the disciplines of cabinetry, weaving, pottery and other artisans which would be displayed in appropriate cultural context.

A site for this undertaking was chosen in Mumford, New York, a quiet corner of Monroe County. Much of the land, once cleared and farmed, had reverted to the wild state which greeted the first settlers. Stone fences trailing through the rolling woodlands and anchoring the hedgerows remained as evidence of the frontier farming venture.

For ten years the founder and the museum director, architectural historian Stuart Bolger, guided a corps of carpenters and masons in turning the long-neglected land to new uses in the form of a recreated village. During the first decade of development, some three dozen buildings of the style, type, and function found in the rural communities of western New York were acquired and placed in the configuration of an early Genesee Country hamlet. Vintage farm structures were moved in and placed alongside the village. With care and historical respect these buildings were restored.

Concurrently, the curatorial staff undertook the quest for relevant artifacts to furnish and equip the renewed buildings. The results of their quest are fully furnished houses, shops and farms supported by a large collection of antiques and historical pieces.

== Historic Village ==
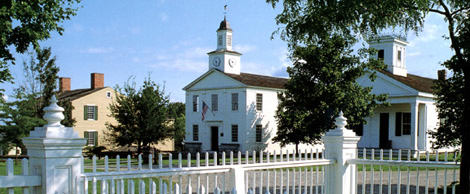
The Historic Village of 68 relocated area buildings

The Historic Village is the core of the museum. With the layout of a small 19th-century village, 68 restored and furnished buildings are available to walk through. A wide spectrum of buildings is presented, from the simple frontier cabin to an elaborate Victorian mansion, with professional, religious, and business buildings as well. Most buildings are staffed by costumed interpreters, providing information about the history of the building, the time period, and in certain instances, demonstrating a craft or trade.

The village is divided into three sections that represent different eras within 19th century Western New York: Early Settlement (1790-1820), Center Village (1830-1870), and Gas Light District (1850-1900).

=== Demonstrations occurring throughout the village ===
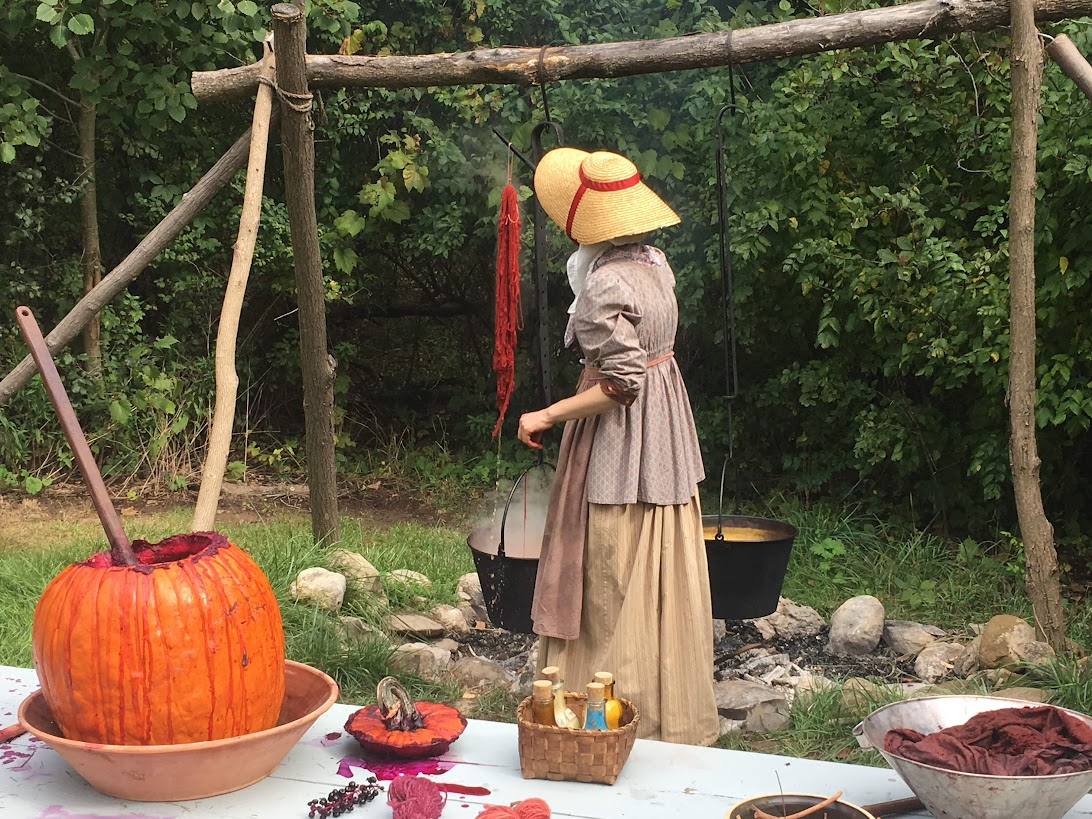
Demonstration of 19th century natural dyeing technique at Genesee Country Village & Museum

- 19th-century games
- Quilting
- Weaving
- Fabric dyeing
- Wool spinning
- Cooking
- Broom making
- Farming
- Printing
- Blacksmithing
- Coopering
- Pottery throwing
- Woodworking
- Gunsmithing
- Tinsmithing
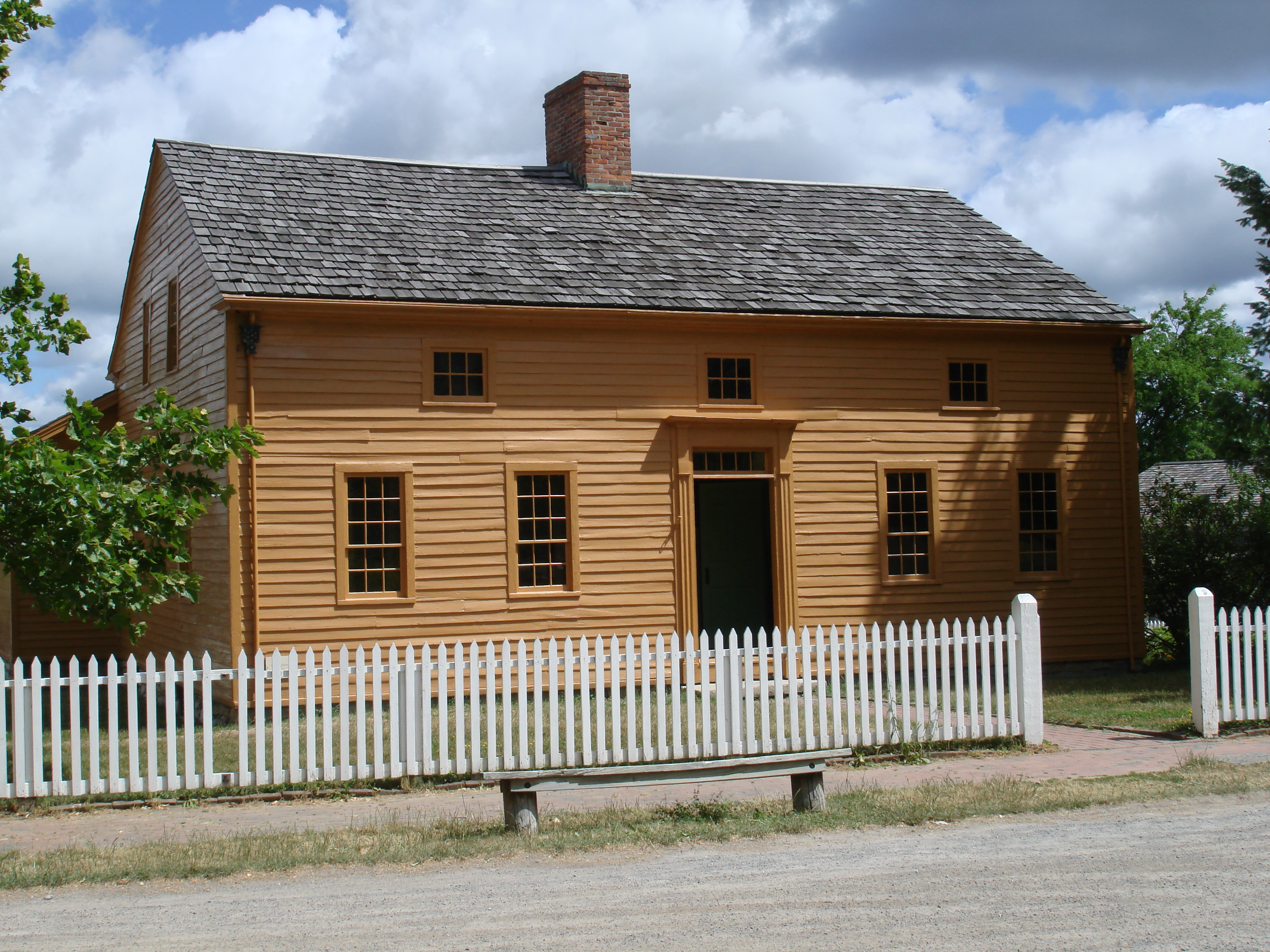
Humphrey Colonial house

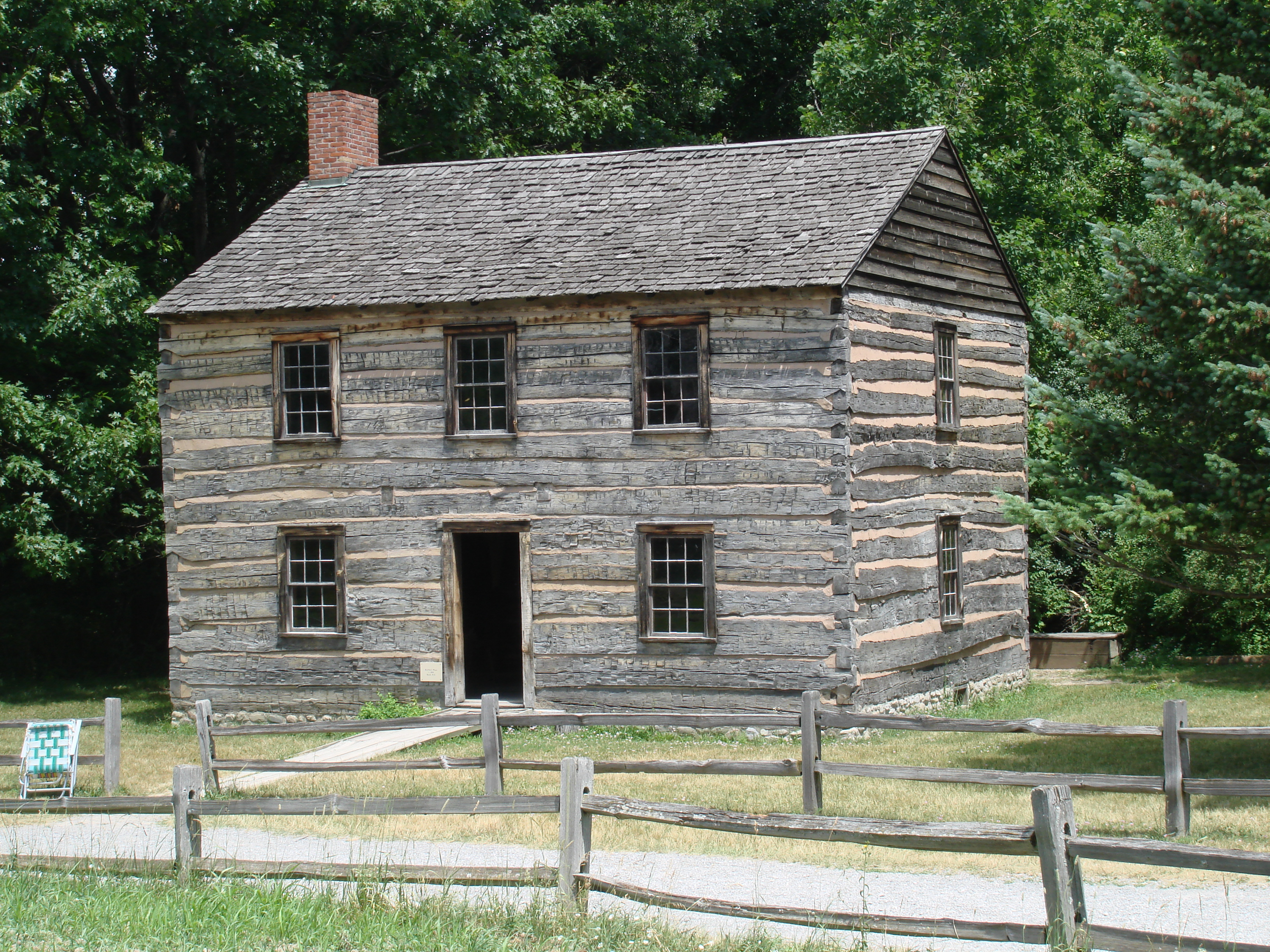
Kieffer House

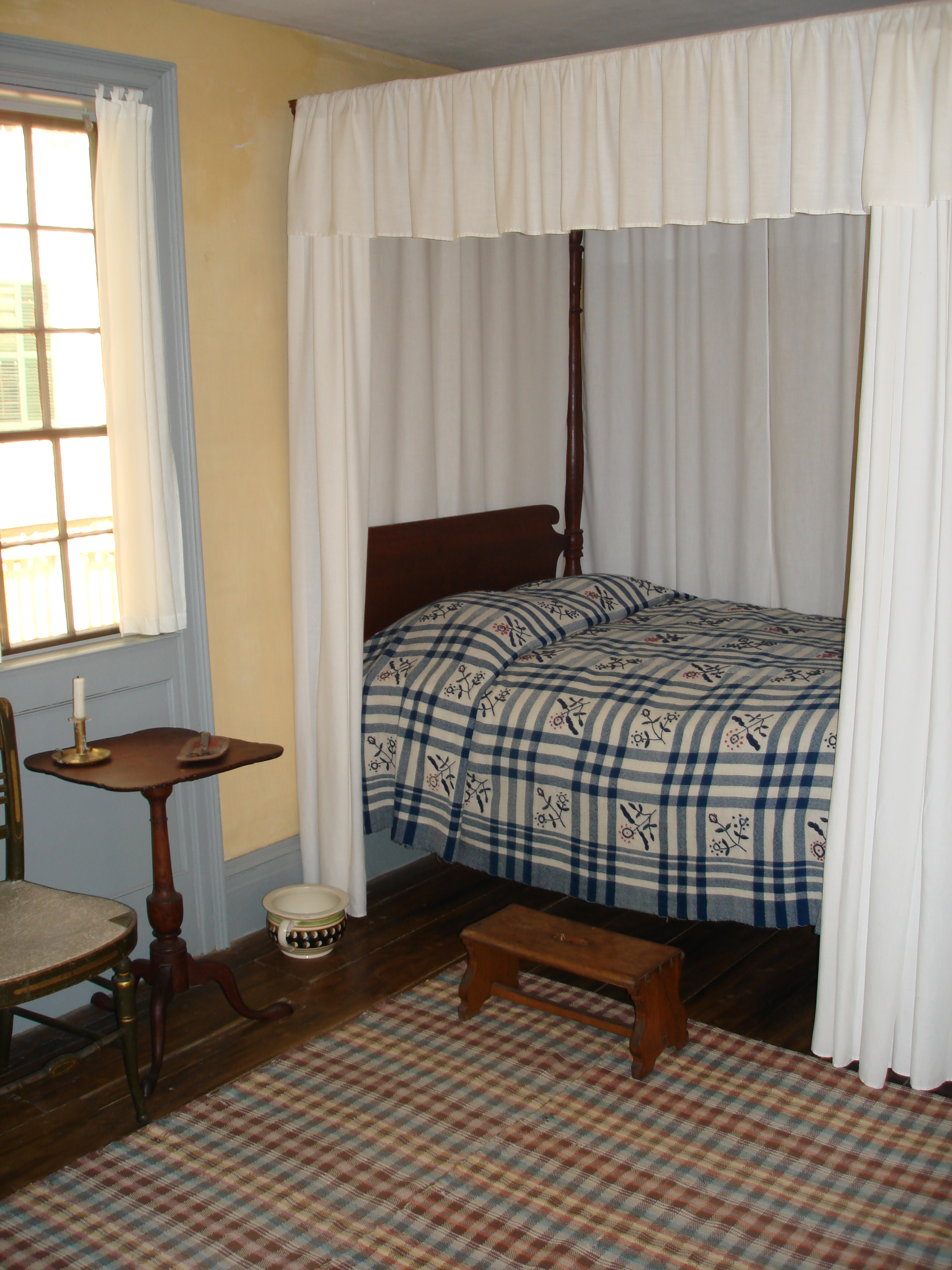
Bedroom

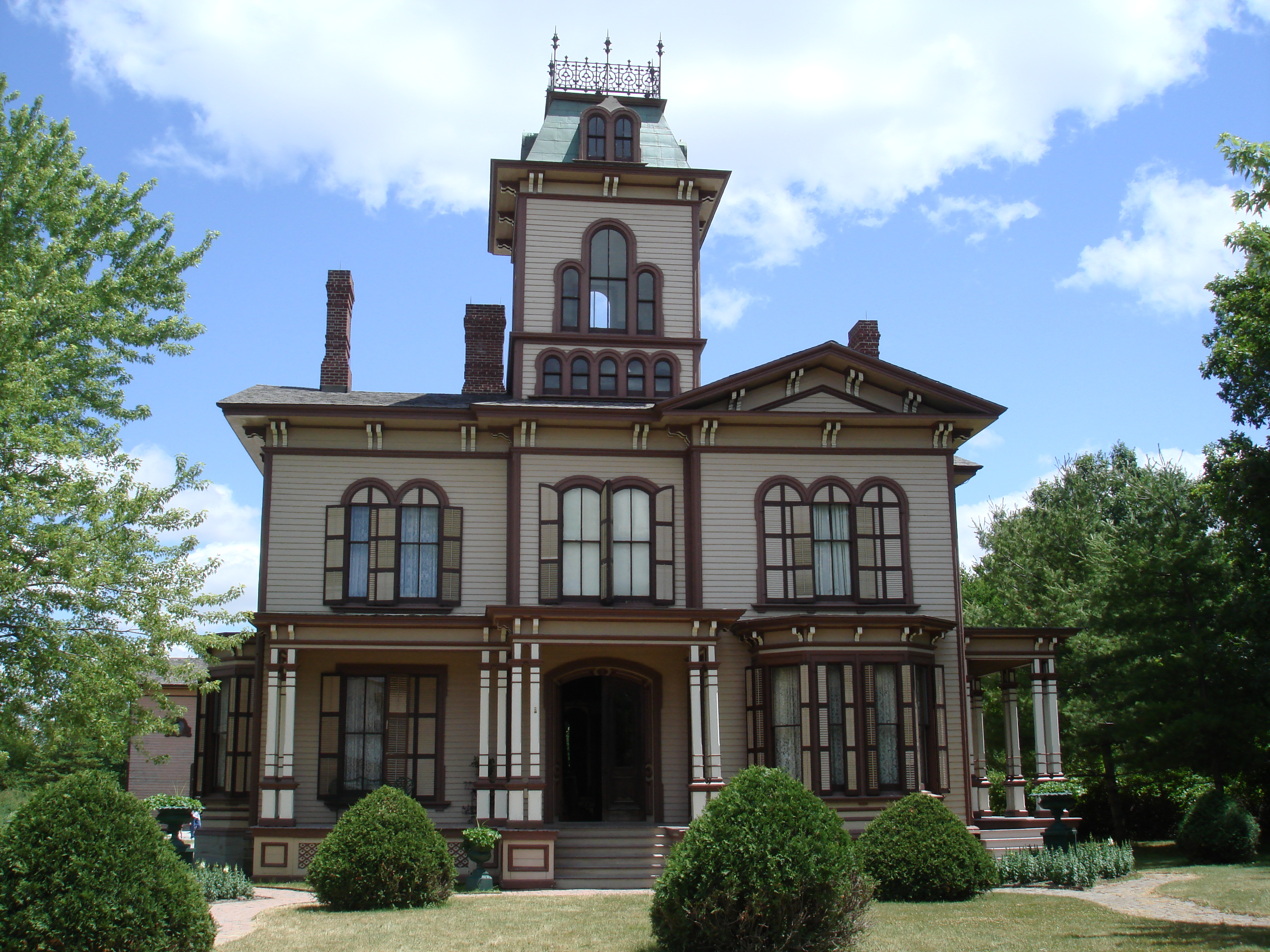
Hamilton house

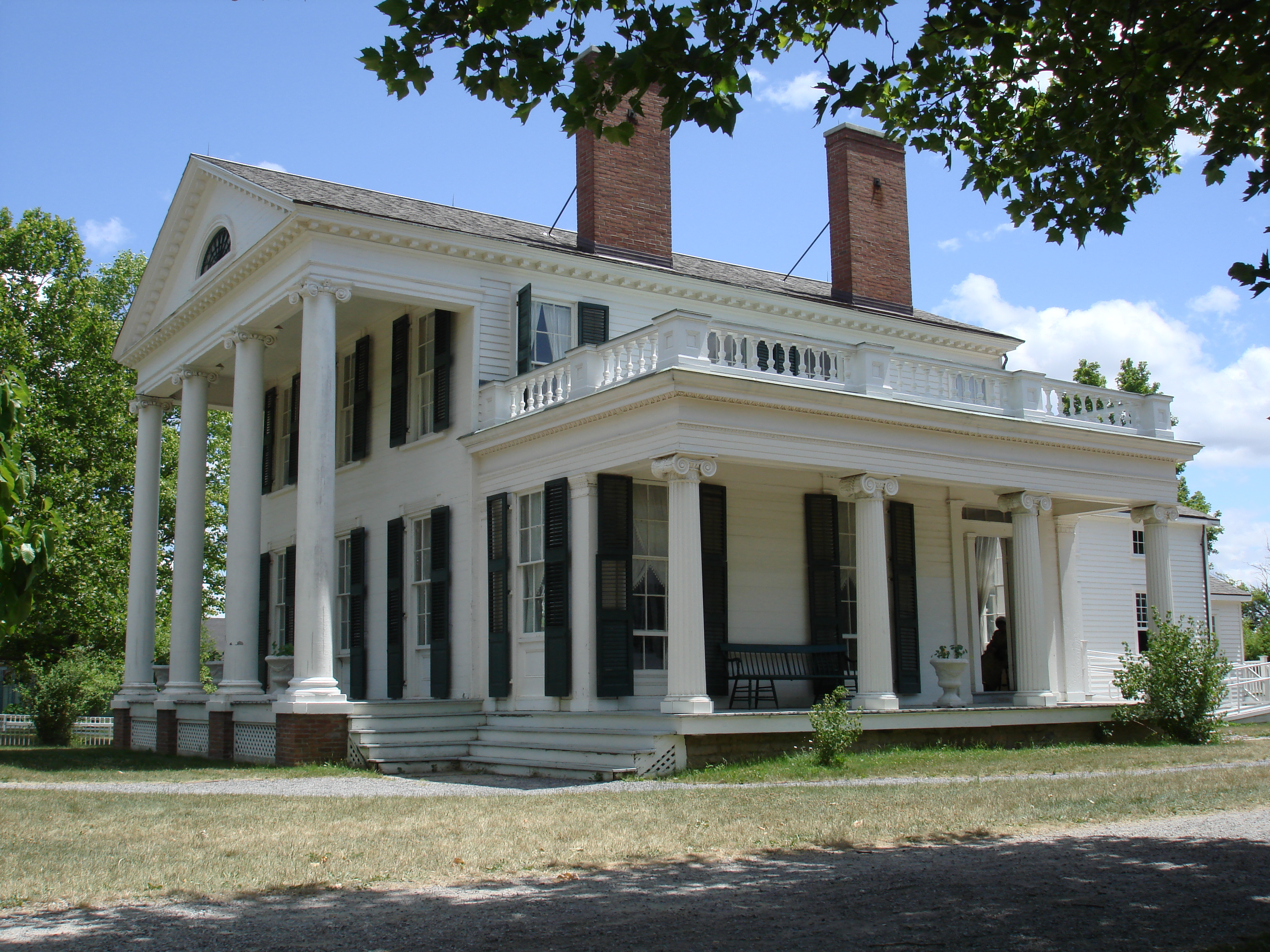
Livingston Backus House

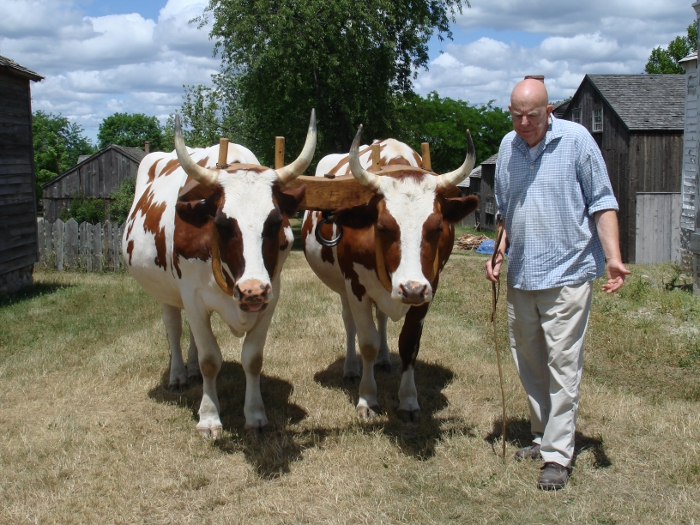
Oxen team

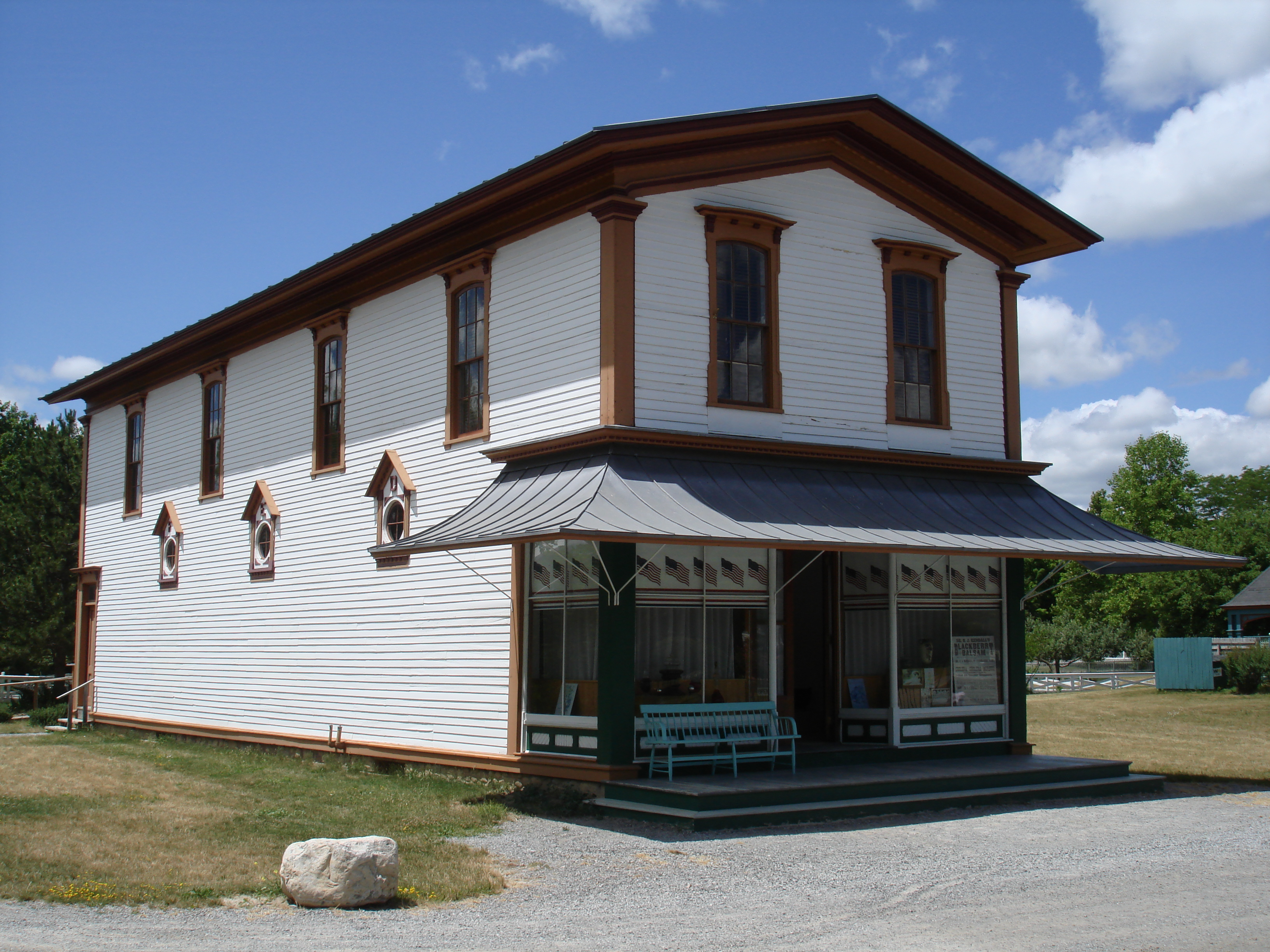
Davis Opera house

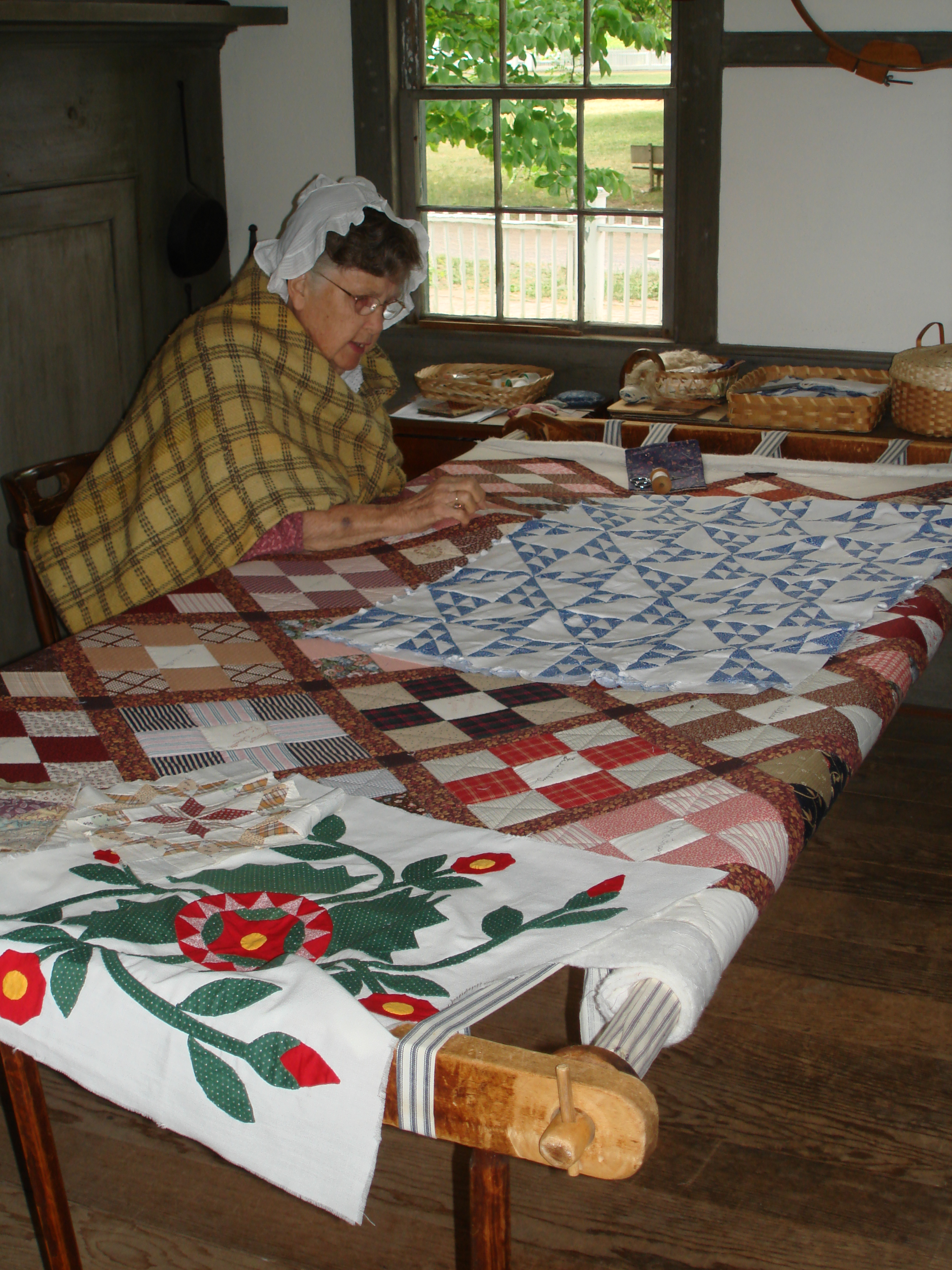
Quiltmaker

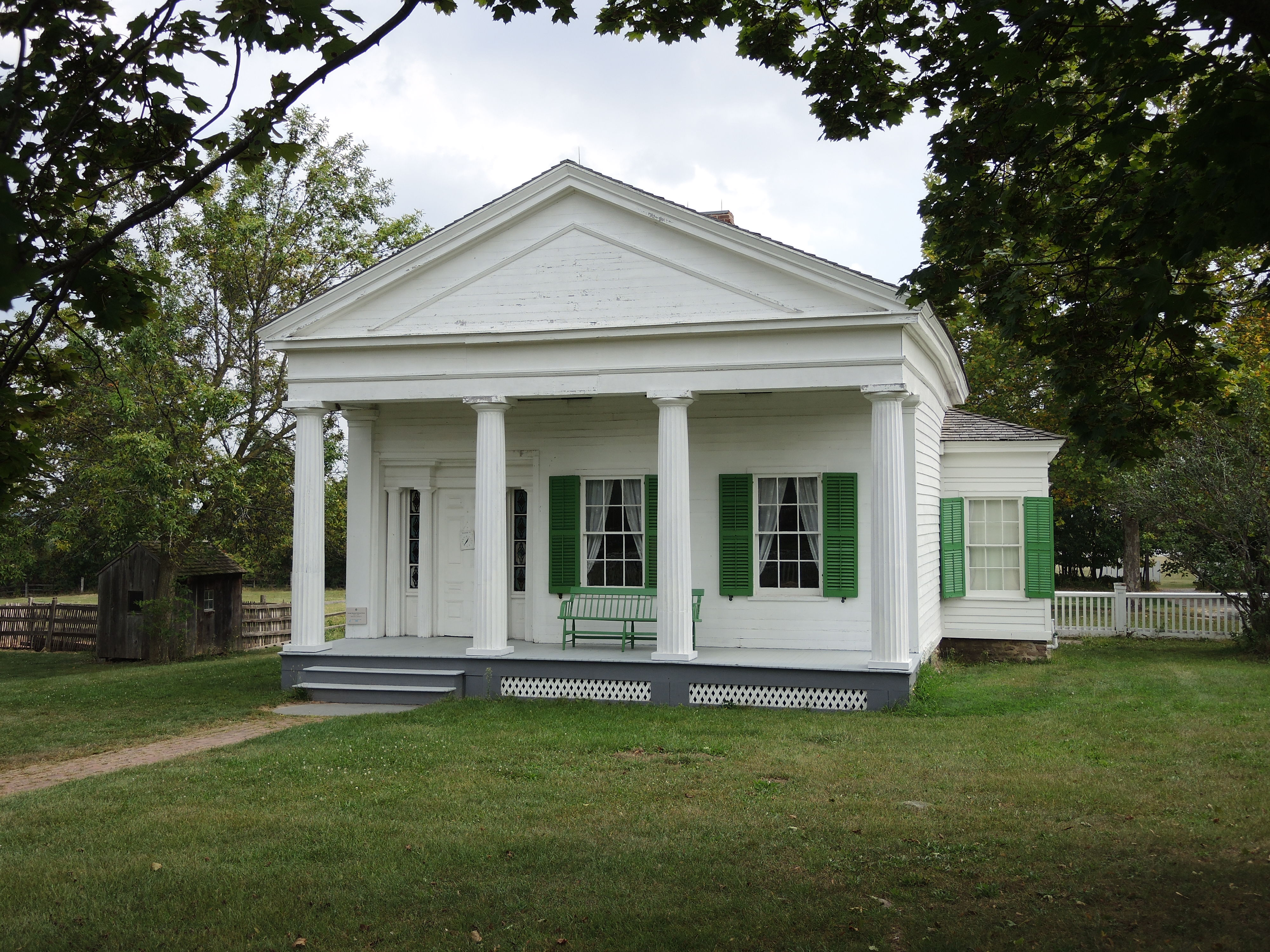
George Eastman's boyhood home

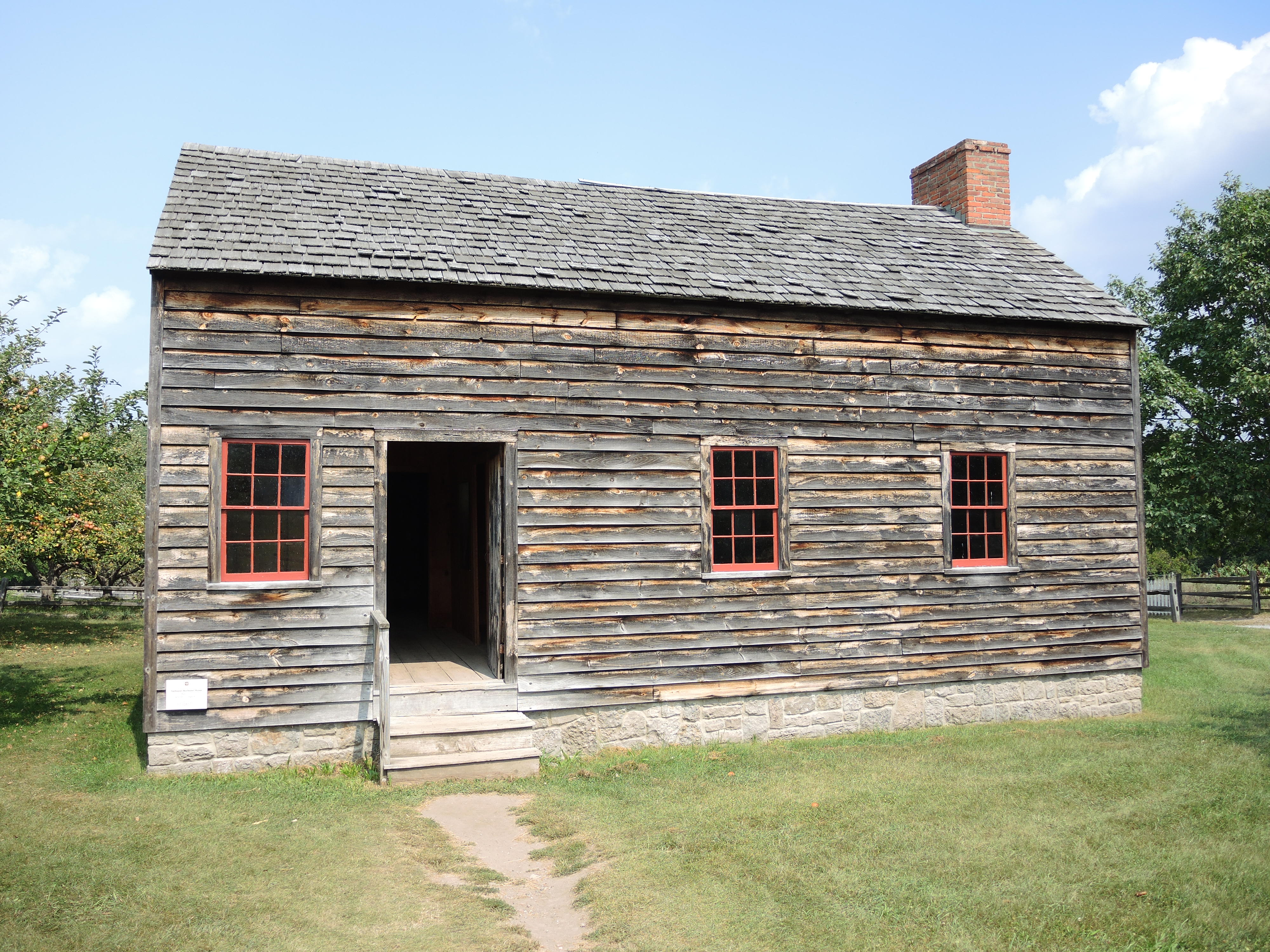
Nathaniel Rochester's home

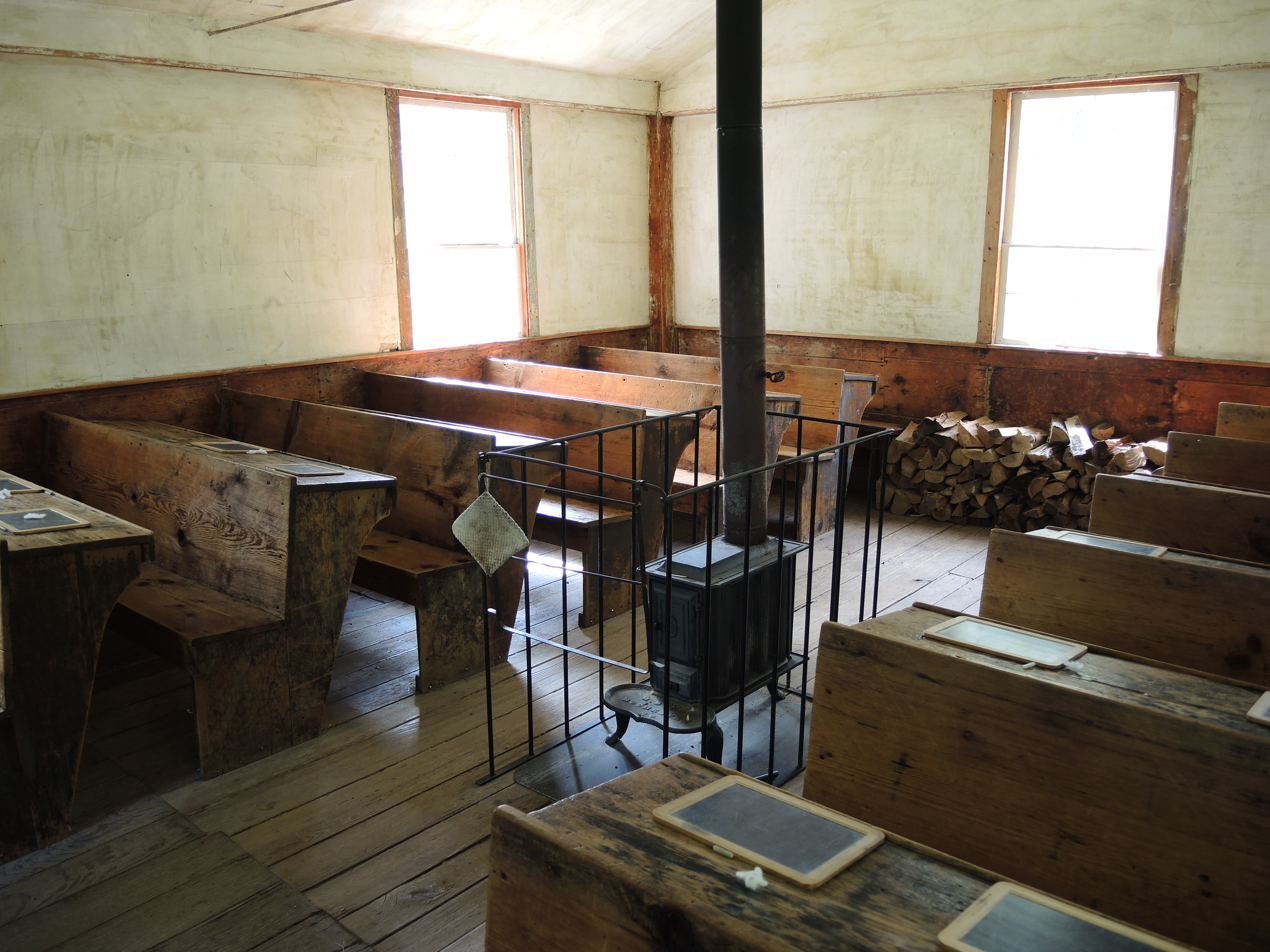
The interior of the one-room schoolhouse

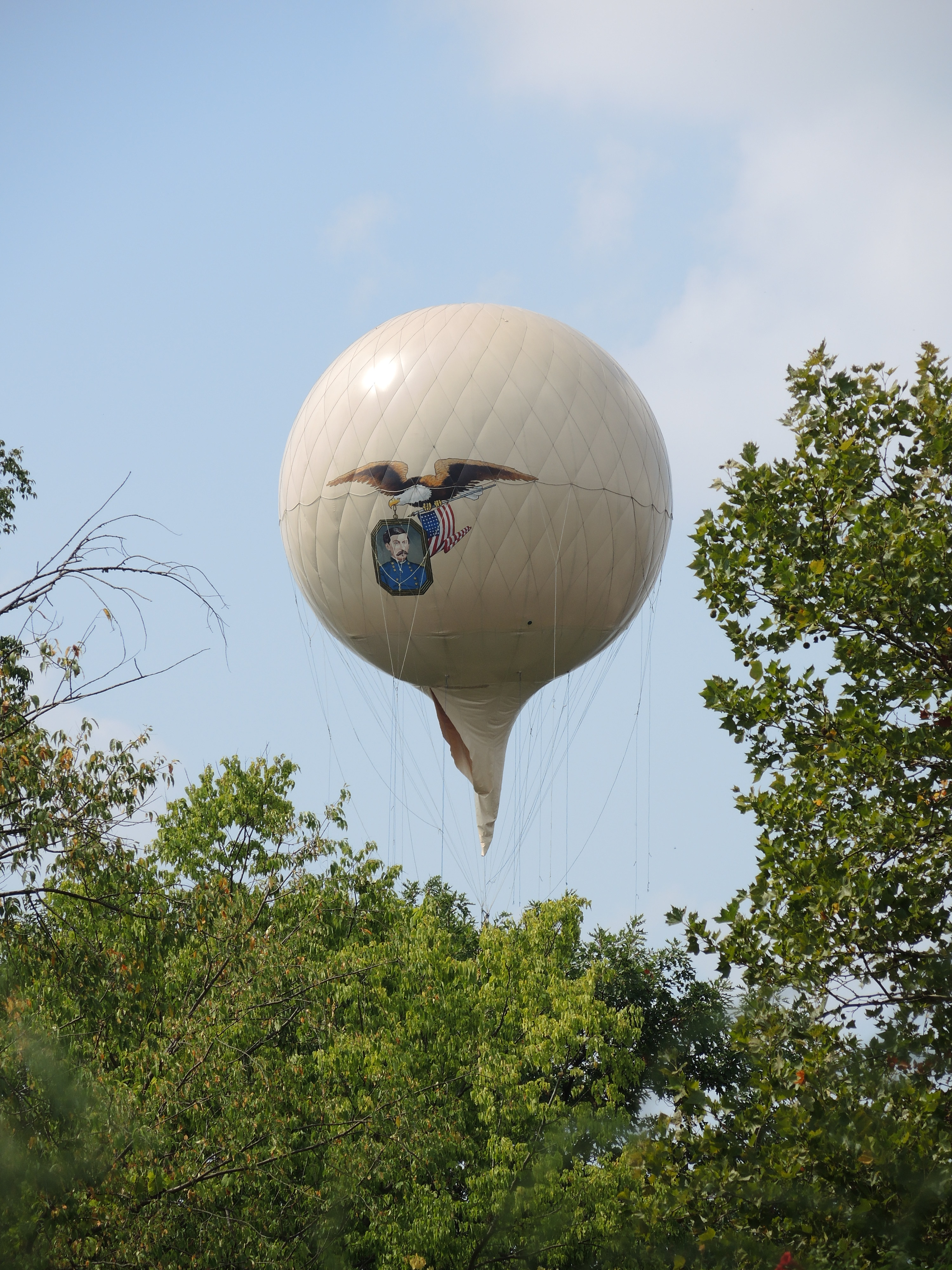
A replica of the Civil War observation balloon the Intrepid

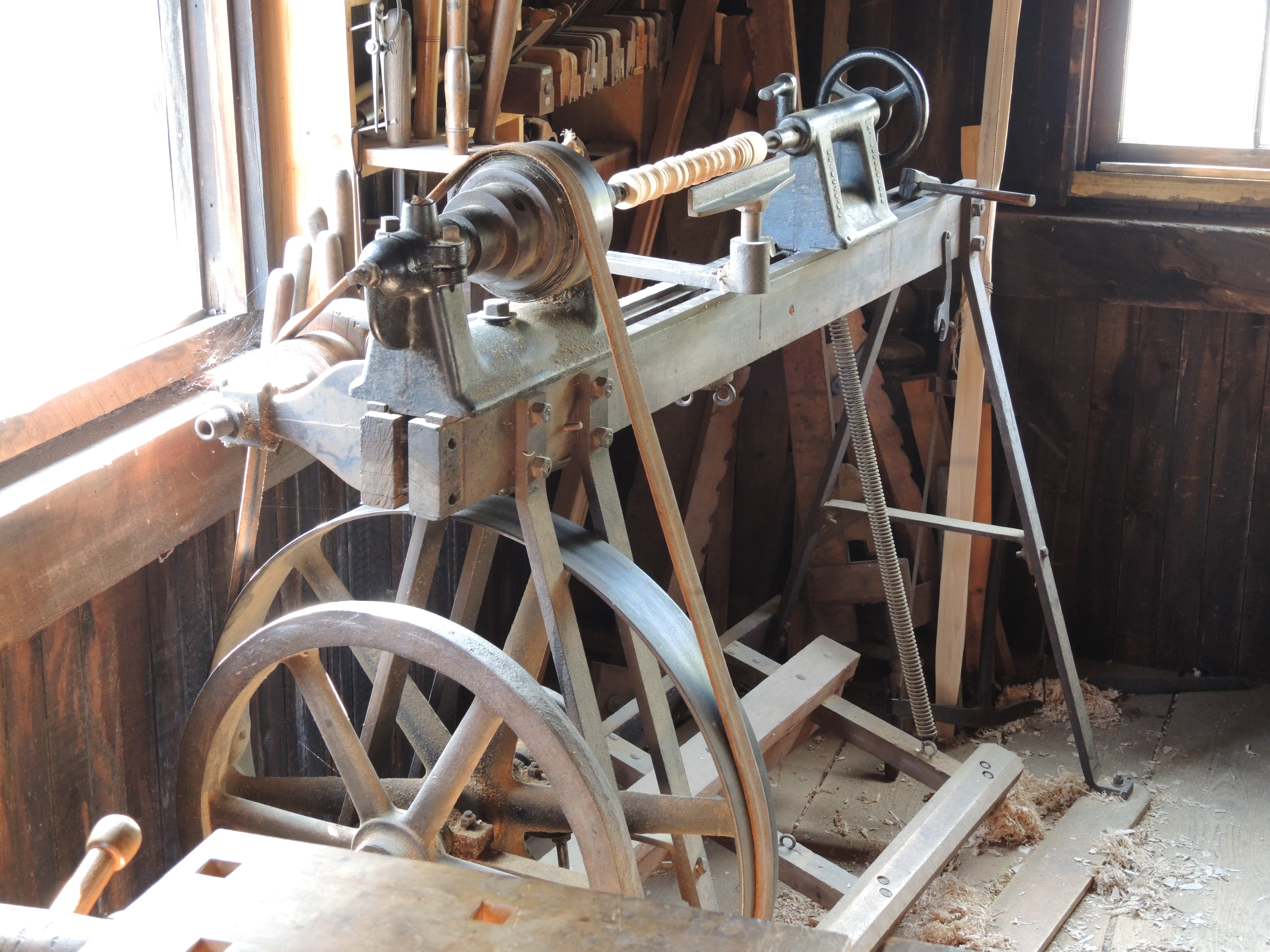
A treadle lathe at the gunsmith shop

== Silver Baseball Park ==
The most recent addition to the museum's grounds is Silver Baseball Park, built for games of vintage base ball. Silver Baseball Park is the first replica 19th-century baseball park in America, and began its operation on August 11, 2001. The park's name commemorates both Morrie Silver, the former owner, president, and general manager of the Rochester Red Wings; and the museum's twenty-fifth anniversary.

Annual tournaments have been held at the Baseball Park since 2003, covering a three-day weekend in August and drawing teams from across the United States. The games are played using 1868 rules, including a lack of gloves or protective equipment, the use of metal plates, underhand pitches, and the discretion of the umpire to call a pitch a ball or strike.

== Heirloom Gardens ==
Spread throughout the museum's grounds are thirteen heirloom gardens. Eye-catching blossoms, fragrant herbs, luscious fruits and rows upon rows of colorful vegetables are the components of these gardens. Most of what is grown in the gardens is used regularly by village interpreters for preparing meals in the historic kitchens, dyeing fibers and making decorations or craft projects. During the spring and summer months, both adults and children can learn more through various educational programs, tours and demonstrations that are specific to gardening.

== The John L. Wehle Gallery of Sporting Art ==
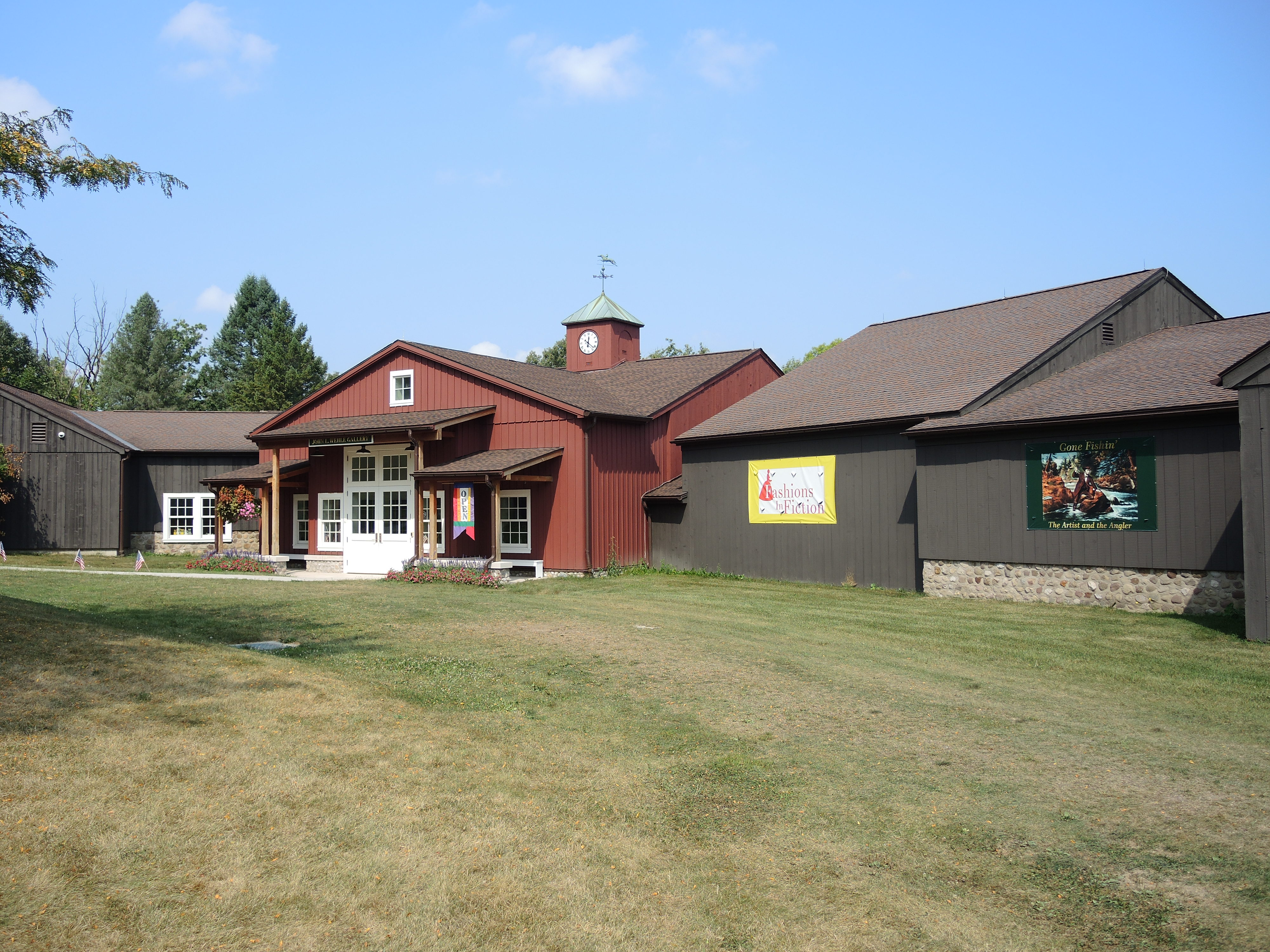
The gallery

John Whele was an avid collector of sporting art. His collection, displayed in the gallery, includes wildlife and sporting art that spans four centuries - from the 17th to the 20th. Included are featured works by artists such as John James Audubon, Robert Bateman, Frederic Remington, Carl Rungius, Maud Earl, Bob Kuhn, Allan Houser and Bruno Liljefors. A large sculpture garden is located outside the gallery amongst the trees. The paintings and sculptures in this collection trace the social, artistic and ideological changes in the interaction between humans and animals.

The gallery also houses the Bruce & Susan Greene Costume Collection, which includes over 3,500 historical clothing items from men, women, and children.

Rotating exhibits as well as gallery talks are also featured in this building.

== The Carriage Museum ==
A range of horse-drawn carriages from the 19th and early 20th centuries fills the Carriage Museum. This unique collection presents a broad scope of two- and four-wheeled vehicles and sleighs. The collection includes the basic horse-drawn conveyance that characterized the 19th-century rural scene, utility vehicles, sporting rigs, pleasure carts, and veteran vehicles from the harness track. One drawing much interest is the 12-horse hitch wagon from Wehle's family business, Genesee Brewing Company.

== Genesee Country Nature Center ==
The Nature Center sits adjacent to the Historic Village on 175 acres (71 ha) of woodlands, old fields and meadows. Visitors can view the native flora and fauna, and explore educational programs and exhibits at the Nature Center building. There are a number of trails in the area for hiking and cross-country skiing or snowshoeing.

== Special events ==
Special events are the highlight of the museum. They regularly occur throughout the year in both the Historic Village and Nature Center and are designed for all ages. Numerous classes are also available for both children and adults throughout the museum. A few offerings are listed below:

=== Historic Village events ===
- Summer Sampler Children's Classes
- Adult Craft Classes
- Mother's and Father's Day events
- 4th of July Celebration
- War of 1812 reenactment
- Civil War living history
- Scottish Highland Games and Celtic Faire
- Fiddle & Folk Festival (formerly the Fiddlers' Fair)
- Great Outdoors Festival
- Agricultural Society Fair
- Spirits of the Past Halloween event
- Yuletide in the Country

=== Nature Center events ===
- Children's Summer Earth Camp
- Birds of Prey event
- Maple Sugar Festival
- Trail Hikes
- Stargazing
