= FIFCO USA =

American brewing conglomerate

- Company type: Private
- Industry: Brewing
- Founded: 2009
- Headquarters: 445 Saint Paul Street, Rochester, New York, United States
- Owner: Florida Ice & Farm Co. (FIFCO)
- Subsidiaries: Labatt USA; Genesee Brewing Company; Pyramid; Magic Hat
- Website: Official Site

FIFCO USA is an American brewing company based in Rochester, New York.

Established as North American Breweries by New York City investment firm KPS Capital Partners to manage its brewery acquisitions (Genesee Brewing Company, Pyramid, and Magic Hat), the company has been owned by the Costa Rican food and beverages company Florida Ice & Farm Co. (FIFCO) since December 2012.

In 2018, the company changed to its present name.

In March 2020, FIFCO USA named Piotr Jurjewicz as the company's new Chief Marketing Officer.

== Labatt USA ==
In 2009, the company purchased Labatt USA, subsidiary of the Canadian Labatt Brewing Company, including the American rights to its core Labatt products (such as Blue, Blue Light, and Labatt 50) and agreed to brew those brands on Labatt USA's behalf until 2012. This sale was mandated by the U.S. Department of Justice for competitive reasons following InBev's merger with Anheuser-Busch, since Budweiser and Labatt Blue were both among the top brands in upstate New York, despite the latter having less than 1% market share in the U.S. overall. The sale did not include U.S. rights to Labatt products not carrying the Labatt label, such as Kokanee or Alexander Keith's, which are now distributed in the U.S. by Anheuser-Busch. Moreover, the underlying intellectual property (such as the Labatt trademarks) remains the property of the Canadian Labatt firm. In addition, the sale did not affect Labatt's Canadian operations in any way; Anheuser-Busch InBev retains full control of the Labatt brand portfolio within Canada.

On April 25, 2017, Labatt USA and Pegula Sports and Entertainment partnered on a project to develop the Pegula owned 79 Perry Street in the Cobblestone District in Buffalo into a mixed-use facility, including a small test brewery called the "Labatt House", a restaurant called "The Draft Room", and retail, commercial and residential space. The company relocated its Labatt USA headquarters from Fountain Plaza to the building's second floor in November 2018 and PSE moved its headquarters to the building's third and fourth floor in 2019.
