= Holihan Brothers =

Former brewery in Lawrence, Massachusetts

Coordinates: 42.689°N 71.1717°W

Holihan Brothers of Lawrence, Mass. began as a producer of whiskeys in 1856. They operated the Diamond Spring Brewery from 1912 until around Prohibition and then opened after Prohibition in 1933. They produced beer and ales under the Holihan's and Diamond Spring labels. The company also made soda beginning in 1917.

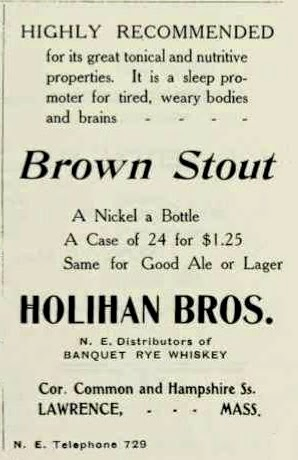
Print advertisement by Holihan Brothers, Lawrence, Mass. 1908 - advertising their brown stout beer.

== History ==
=== Roots as a whiskey distiller ===
The company was established in 1856 in Lawrence, Mass. by Patrick Holihan, a twenty-five year old Irish immigrant, and his brother Peter, as a grocer and liquor distiller, P&P Holihan a.k.a. Holihan Brothers. The liquor distiller was sold in about 1880 upon Patrick Holihan's death and ceased production, only to be bought by his three sons and reopened as a whiskey distiller.

Their firm carried a general line of liquors, including two brands they claimed as proprietary, “Banquet Pure Rye” and “Old 56,” the latter presumably for the year their father and his brother had founded the business.

Their facility was at 427 Common Street near the corner of Hampshire Street. That building was apparently torn down in 1973.

=== Establishment of the brewery ===
In 1912, the three Holihan sons, James, Joseph and Charles, opened a brewery on land purchased near the corner of Andover and Beacon Streets in South Lawrence. They called it the Diamond Spring Brewery, in reference to a spring already located on this site, formerly the Knowles farm. In 1917, they branched into soft drinks using the spring water as a base.

== Post-Prohibition ==
The brewery had a public "tap-room" that was available for public functions.

In its last years, Diamond Spring Brewery was a contract brewer for other brands. The brewery was located at 50 Diamond Street. It closed in 1970 and was converted in 1980 into housing.

== List of beers ==
- Diamond Spring Golden Ale 1933 - 1935
- Diamond Spring Pale Ale 1933 - 1935
- Beacon Ale 1933 - 1936
- Diamond Spring Ale 1933 - 1936
- Diamond Spring Beacon Ale 1933 - 1936
- Diamond Spring Bock Beer 1933 - 1936
- Diamond Spring Porter 1933 - 1936
- Diamond Spring Prime Old Ale 1933 - 1936
- Diamond Spring Tiger Ale 1933 - 1936
- Holihan's Lager Beer 1933 - 1936
- Holihan's Old Time Half Stock Ale 1933 - 1936
- Holihan's Ale 1933 - 1950
- Holihan's Beer 1933 - 1950
- Holihan's Export Beer 1933 - 1950
- Holihan's Half Stock Ale 1933 - 1950
- Holihan's Light Ale 1933 - 1950
- Holihan's Pilsener Beer 1933 - 1950
- Holihan's Special Porter 1933 - 1950
- Holihan's Stock Ale 1933 - 1950
- Holihan's Porter 1934 - 1958
- Beacon Ale 1937 - 1940
- Holihan's Black Horse Ale 1959 - 1968
