= Genesee (automobile) =

Defunct American motor vehicle manufacturer

The Genesee was an American automobile manufactured in Batavia, New York in 1911. The car was named after Genesee County, in which Batavia was located.

The Genesee was one of the largest cars available in the United States at the time, featuring a 148 in (380 cm) wheelbase and a 564 cubic inches (9,240 cc) six-cylinder engine developing 96 horsepower.

A 7-passenger tourer body was fitted, painted and upholstered in black with gold trimming and leather. Plans were made to produce a range of body styles, with prices ranging from $7,000 to $10,000, but production never eventuated. The Genesee was too big and cumbersome to be a practical vehicle.

One of the people behind the building of the Genesee prototype was Dr. Harvey Burkhart, who was elected mayor of Batavia when it became a city in 1915. Burkhart used the Genesee prototype as his private car for many years.
