= Genesee, Lansing, Michigan =

Genesee Neighborhood
- Neighborhood
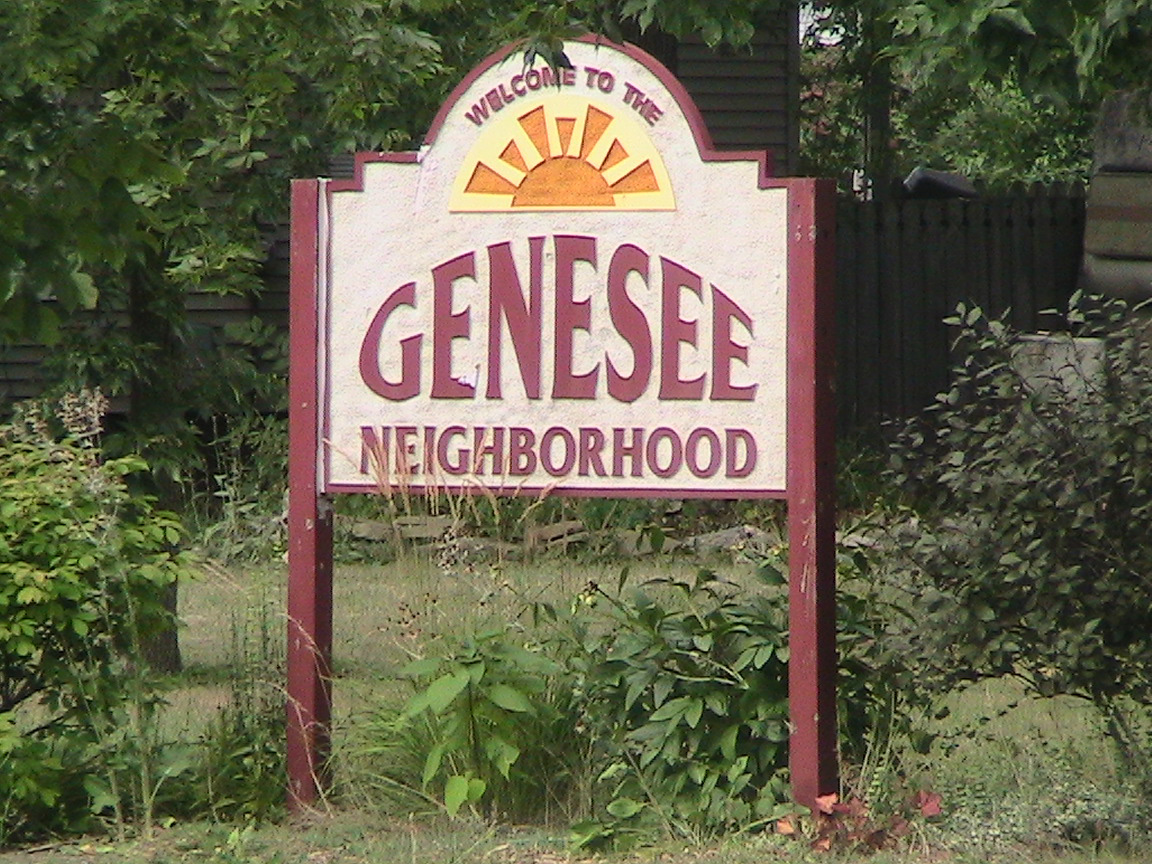
- Genesee Neighborhood sign

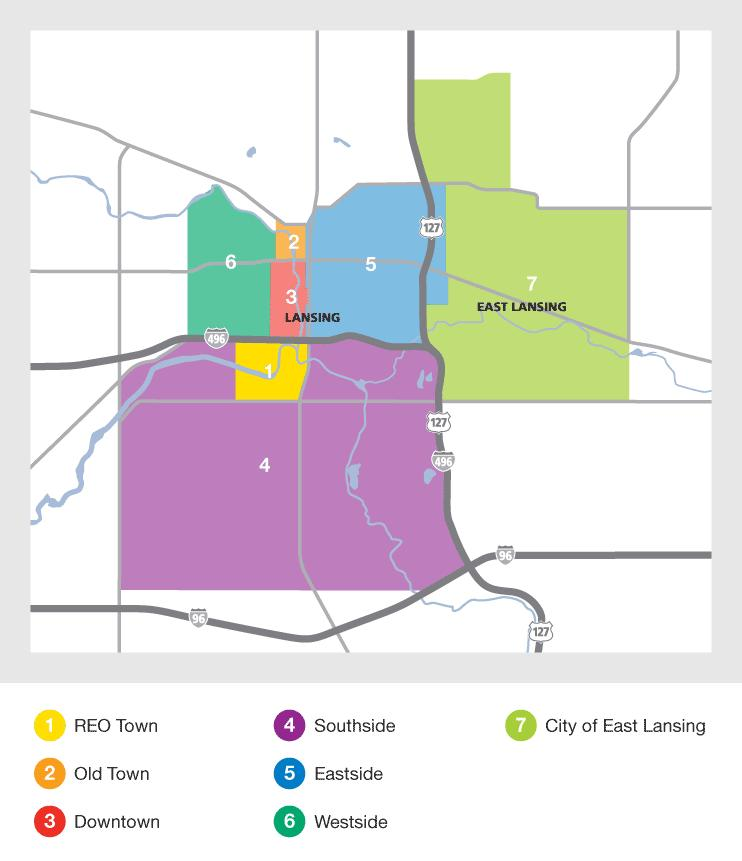
- Location in the state of Michigan
- Coordinates: 42°44′49″N 83°8′35″W
- Country: United States
- State: Michigan
- County: Ingham

Area
  - Total: 0.125 sq mi (0.323 km^{2})
- Elevation: 873 ft (266.1 m)

Population (2010)
  - Total: 965
  - Density: 7,735/sq mi (2,986.5/km^{2})
- Time zone: UTC-5 (EST)
  - Summer (DST): UTC-4 (EDT)
- ZIP codes: 48915, 48933
- Area code: 517

Genesee Neighborhood is a historic neighborhood in Lansing, Michigan. It is located in the northwest corner of downtown Lansing. The neighborhood is bordered by West Saginaw Street (M-43) to the north, Sycamore Street to the east, West Ottawa Street to the south, and Martin Luther King Blvd to the west.
