= Genesee Brewing Company =

Brewery in Rochester, New York, U.S.

Coordinates: 43.1649°N 77.6152°W

- Location: 445 Saint Paul Street, Rochester, New York, U.S.
- Opened: 1878; 148 years ago
- Annual production volume: 2 million US beer barrels (2,300,000 hL) in 2014
- Owner: North American Breweries
- Employees: 460+
- Divisions: Dundee Brewing Company, Honey Brown, Seagram's, Imperial, Labatt Blue Lime, Rock Wall Brewing, Contract Business
- Website: geneseebeer.com

Active beers
| Name | Type |
| Genesee Cream Ale | Cream ale |
| Genesee Beer | Lager |

Genesee Brewing Company (/ˈdʒɛnəsi/ JEN-ə-see) is an American brewery located along the Genesee River in Rochester, New York. From 2000 to 2009, the company was known as the High Falls Brewing Company. In 2009, High Falls was acquired by the capital investment firm KPS Capital. Together with newly acquired Labatt USA, KPS merged the two companies as North American Breweries. Along with this change, High Falls Brewery changed its name back to the original "Genesee Brewing Company" operating under the North American Breweries name. In October 2012, North American Breweries was purchased by FIFCO.

In 2012, North American Breweries was the sixth-largest brewing company in America by sales volume.

== History ==
The pre-Prohibition Genesee Brewery was one of many in the noteworthy history of brewing in Rochester, New York. In 1878, local businessman Mathias Kondolf purchased an already existing brewery, Reisky & Spies, organized a stock company, and incorporated it under the name Genesee Brewing Company. That original brewery was first opened in 1856 by Charles Rau, a former brewmaster at Marburger Brothers, a brewery at 80 North Clinton Avenue. Kondolf would also establish the Moerlbach Brewery on Emerson Street in 1909, which operated until Prohibition.

In 1889 a group of English investors purchased stock in three different Rochester breweries—Genesee Brewery, Rochester Brewing Company, and Bartholomay Brewery Company—and renamed the conglomerate Bartholomew Brewing Company, Limited. The buildings of the Rochester Brewery were converted into a cold storage plant.

In 1932, Louis Wehle, a former brewmaster at Genesee and then vice president and manager of a successful bakery in Rochester, purchased the former brewery buildings and recipes, incorporating the Genesee Brewing Company on July 8. On March 22, 1933, President Franklin D. Roosevelt signed the Cullen–Harrison Act, authorizing the sale of 3.2 percent beer and wine. Wehle relaunched the famous "Liebotschaner" beer and served the first draft on April 29, 1933. The first year's production totaled approximately 150,000 barrels and by 1934 Wehle had nearly 1,000 employees.

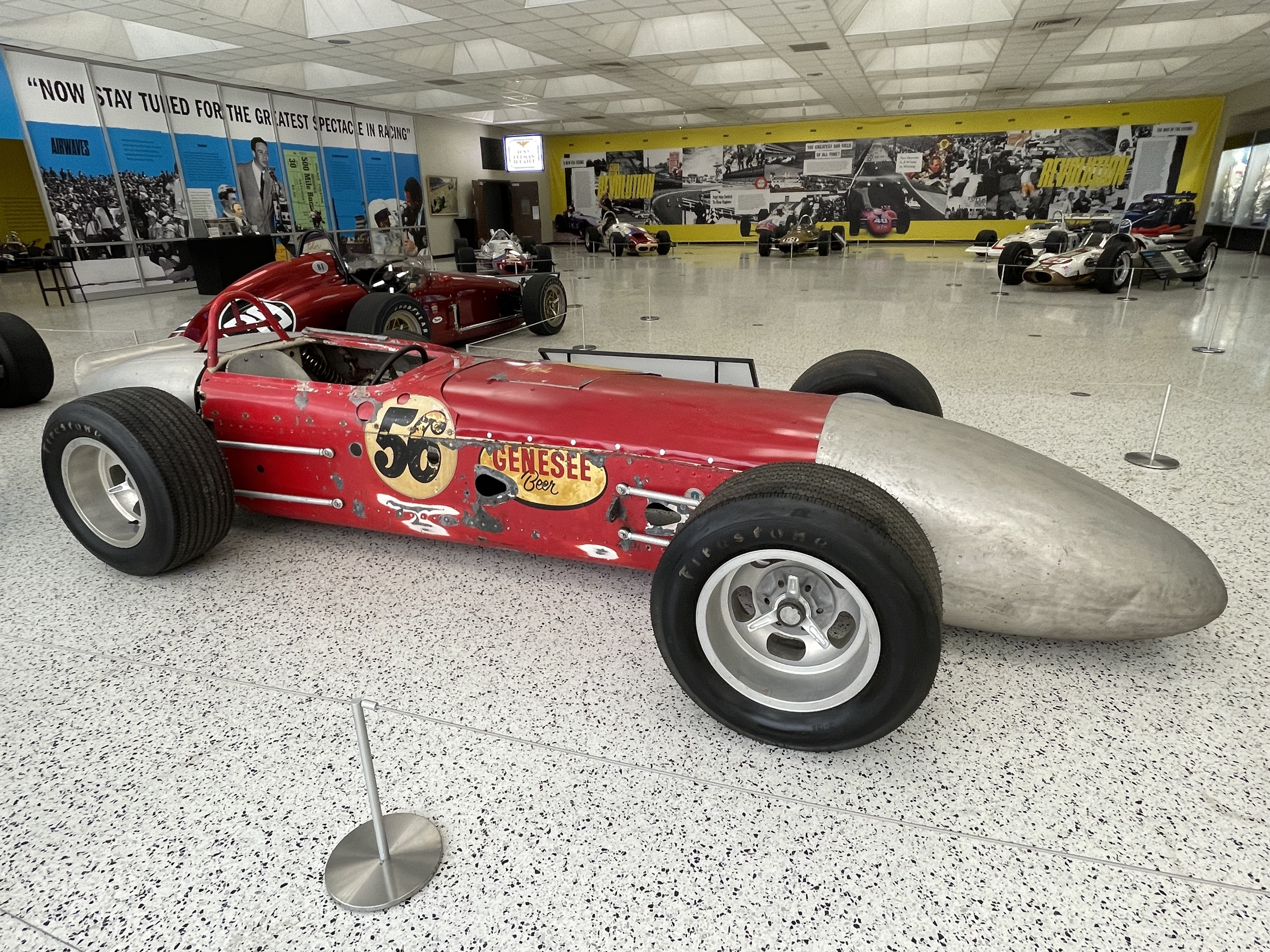
A 1960s race car at the Indianapolis Motor Speedway Museum sponsored by Genesee Brewing Company

In 1936, the Genesee Brewing Company acquired the old Parsons Malt House in Sodus Point, spending nearly $200,000 on renovations that were completed in 1938. At the time, it was the only malt house privately owned by an eastern brewery, and was notable for employing the traditional European floor system for malting barley. Barley would be stored at the grain elevator in Oswego, then sent to Sodus Point for malting. The malt house ended its operations in 1986.

In December 1984, it purchased the Fred Koch Brewery of Dunkirk, New York. At the time The Fred Koch Brewery was owned by Vaux Breweries of Sunderland, England. In the previous year Koch sold about 55,000 barrels of beer, compared with Genesee's 3.2 million. Genesee transferred the brewing of Koch's brands to Rochester which it continued through the 2000s.

=== High Falls Brewing Company ===
In 2000, the company was sold to an employee investment group, and the company's name was changed to High Falls Brewing Company. In 2007, Norman Snyder was named CEO of the company, and announced a change in the Genesee brand labeling, which highlights a more classic look. The company also unveiled a new corporate website and increased marketing of the Genesee brand of beers.

=== North American Breweries and FIFCO ===
In February 2009, High Falls Brewery was sold to a New York City investment group KPS Capital Partners to be run as part of its North American Breweries (NAB) subsidiary. In June of the same year, it was announced that the name of the brewery would revert to Genesee Brewing Company to reflect the company's long history.

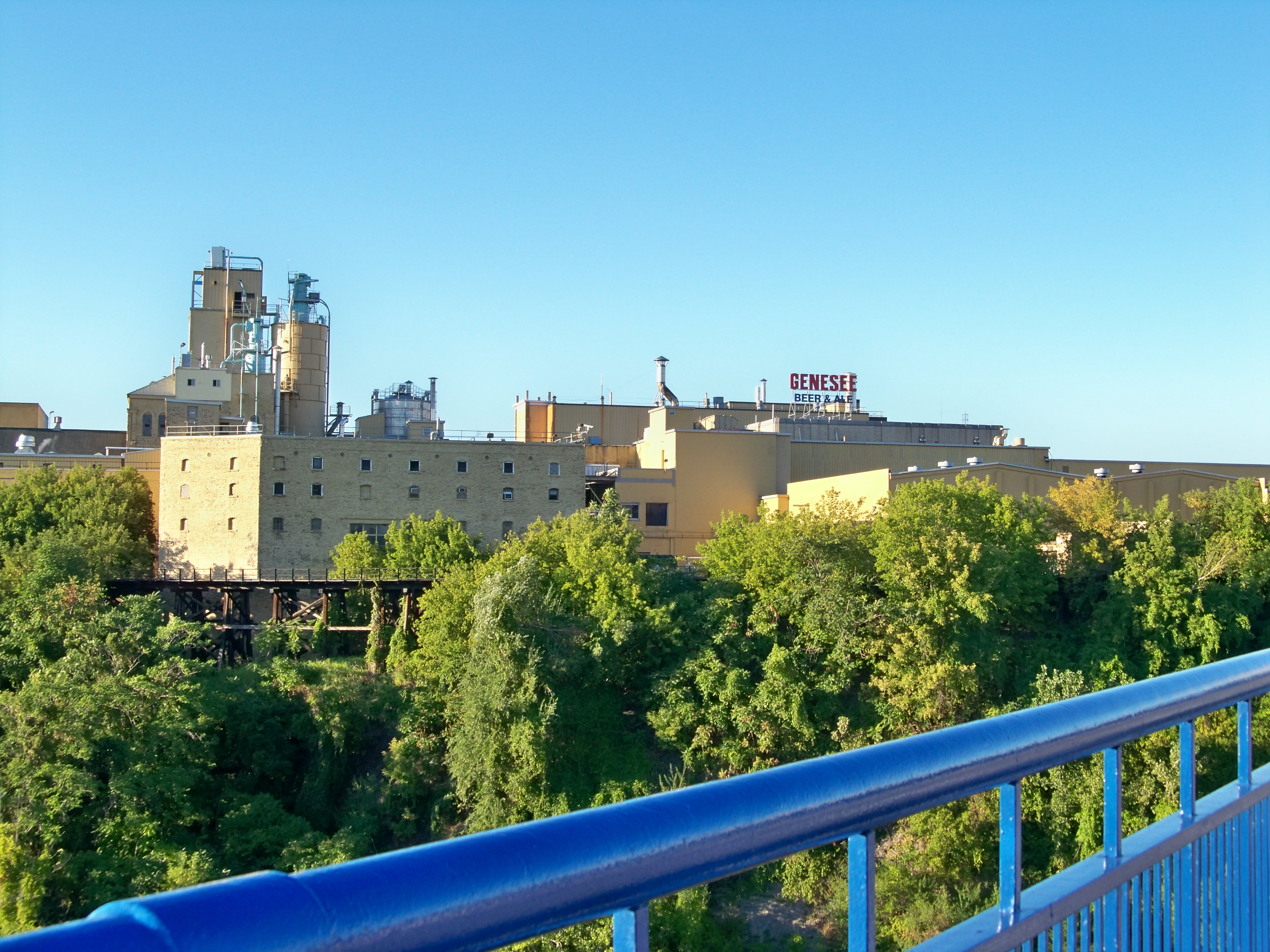
Genesee Brewery on a bluff above the Genesee River in Rochester, New York in 2010.

In October 2012, NAB was purchased by FIFCO in an all-cash deal totaling $338 million, through its subsidiary, Cerveceria Costa Rica. FIFCO is a food and beverage company headquartered in San Jose, Costa Rica. The company's product portfolio includes beer, bottled water, natural fruit drinks, juices and other beverages. The new owner stated that "The workforce, the current leadership, the current operation will remain as they have been."

=== Modernization ===
On September 8, 2012, the $3.9 million Genesee Brew House opened to the public. The 9,200-square-foot former packaging center features interactive exhibits and multimedia presentations that explore Genesee's history, along with a gift shop and a pub-style restaurant.

In September, 2016 NAB announced on an expansion and redesign project. Then-governor Andrew Cuomo announced that New York State would add an additional $9.5 million in state funding, including a $5 million capital grant through the Upstate Revitalization Initiative. It was around this time the brewery switched from its previous lauter tun system to a mash filter system.

In 2018, Genesee Brewery completed a renovation project which included the installation of 24 fermentation and storage tanks outside the new "cold block" building and a new dry-hopping system.

Purchase by Saothair Capital Partners

In September 2026, FIFCO USA sold Genesee Brewing to Saothair Capital Partners, a Pennsylvania based private equity firm. Saothair returned the name of Genesee to North American Breweries, reverting the FIFCO USA name change.

== Beers ==
=== 12 Horse Ale ===
First introduced in 1933, just after the prohibition was repealed in the United States, 12 Horse Ale is brewed with six-row barley malt, hops from the Yakima Valley, and Genesee's proprietary top-fermenting ale yeast. This yeast was brought to the brewery in 1933 from England and has been used in brewing ever since. To coincide with the beer release, a marketing campaign produced what was believed to be the only 12-horse hitch in the world, harnessing a unique matched team of a dozen red roan Belgians, hitched three abreast in four rows with a red wagon. The barn that housed the unique team and their harness is displayed at the Genesee Country Village and Museum

=== Genesee Cream Ale ===
Genesee Cream Ale was originally conceived by brewmaster Clarence Geminn in 1960. It has 5.1% alcohol by volume. The beer is recognized for winning two consecutive gold medals at the Great American Beer Festival.

=== Genny Light ===
Genny Light was first introduced in 1978, the 100-year anniversary of the original brewery.

=== Genesee Specialty ===
- Ruby Red Kolsch is a grapefruit-flavored Kölsch-style beer available seasonally March through July. It was first introduced in 2018.
- Spring Bock has been brewed seasonally—traditionally arriving at stores in January and remaining available through March—since 1951. The first Genesee Spring Bock was brewed in 1879.
- Schwarzbier is a dark session lager first introduced in 2018 meant to be a bridge between the Spring Bock and Oktoberfest releases.
- Oktoberfest is a Märzen-style beer first introduced in 2016.
- Cream Ale Dry Hopped is a fall/winter edition of Genesee's seasonal cream ale line-up, which consists of two beers split across six-month seasons. It is brewed with a selection of “modern hops” handpicked by head brewmaster Steve Kaplan. It was first launched in Fall 2021.
- Lemon Strawberry Cream Ale is the second of Genesee's seasonal cream ale line-up.
- Cran Orange Kellerbier, a style of low-alcohol German lager, is a fall seasonal first released in 2021.

=== Fyfe & Drum ===
A light beer, Fyfe & Drum was introduced in the 1960s and was discontinued with the emergence of Genny Light in 1978.

=== Dundee Ales & Lagers ===
In 1994, Genesee introduced J.W. Dundee's Honey Brown, which has proven to be one of their most popular brews. It won a gold medal at the 1994 World Beer Cup. In 2006, High Falls added two new beers to the J.W. Dundee's family, J.W. Dundee's American Pale Ale and J.W. Dundee's American Amber Lager. In June 2008, the company announced a re-branding of the J.W. Dundee line, which is now called Dundee Ales and Lagers.

=== Seagram's Escapes ===
Along with the formation of North American Breweries, Genesee purchased all of the brand rights to Seagram's Escapes Flavored Coolers in the US. Seagram's Escapes are part of the Flavored Malt Beverage category and provide a variety of flavored alcoholic beverages. As of November 2009, all Seagram's Escapes are produced out of the Rochester-based facility.

=== Rock Wall Brewing Co. ===
In late 2010, Genesee Brewing developed a new product line under the Rock Wall brewing name. Rock Wall Brewing produces a high alcohol malt liquor product, known as Dog Bite High Gravity.

They also sell their IPA under the Wild Range name at Aldi.

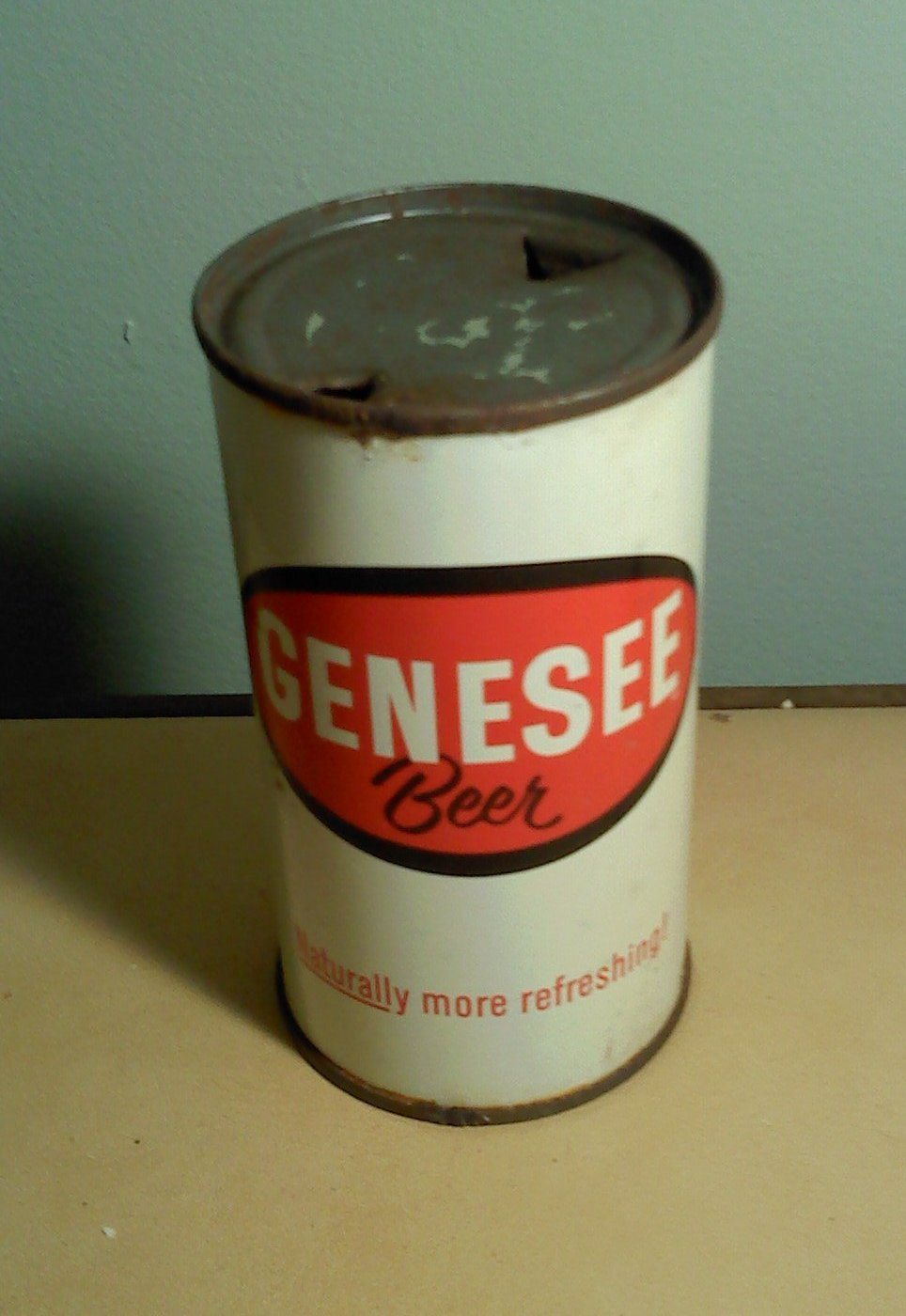
Old Genesee Beer with two holes from a "churchkey" or opener for "flat top" cans

=== Imported beverages ===
Genesee had an exclusive contract to import Cerveza Imperial from Costa Rica before its 2012 acquisition by Cerveceria Costa Rica.

Genesee owns the U.S. import rights to Labatt Brewing Company's beers, which originate from Canada. Labatt products are brewed by Anheuser-Busch InBev, but Anheuser Busch InBev cannot produce or distribute the brand in the United States because it is popular enough in Western New York to raise antitrust problems, prompting the company to contract with Genesee for U.S. distribution of the brand.

=== Contract brewing ===
Genesee brews for Trouble Brewing (Walmart), Seven Kings Brewery, and Narragansett Brewing Company.

Genesee is also a regional brewer for Mike's Hard Lemonade and other malt beverage products, with Genesee Brewing Company producing almost all of the Mike's sold to the east coast market.

Genesee contract manufactures Mountain Brew Beer Ice, and Stew Brew for Stewart's Shops, along with Big Flats 1901 for Walgreens.

Sainsbury's American Pale Ale and Tap Room IPA in the UK are brewed by the Genesee Brewery under the pseudonym Tap Room Brewing Co,. These are 5.3% and 6.3% ABV own branded beers under their "Taste the difference" label.
