= List of breweries in New York =

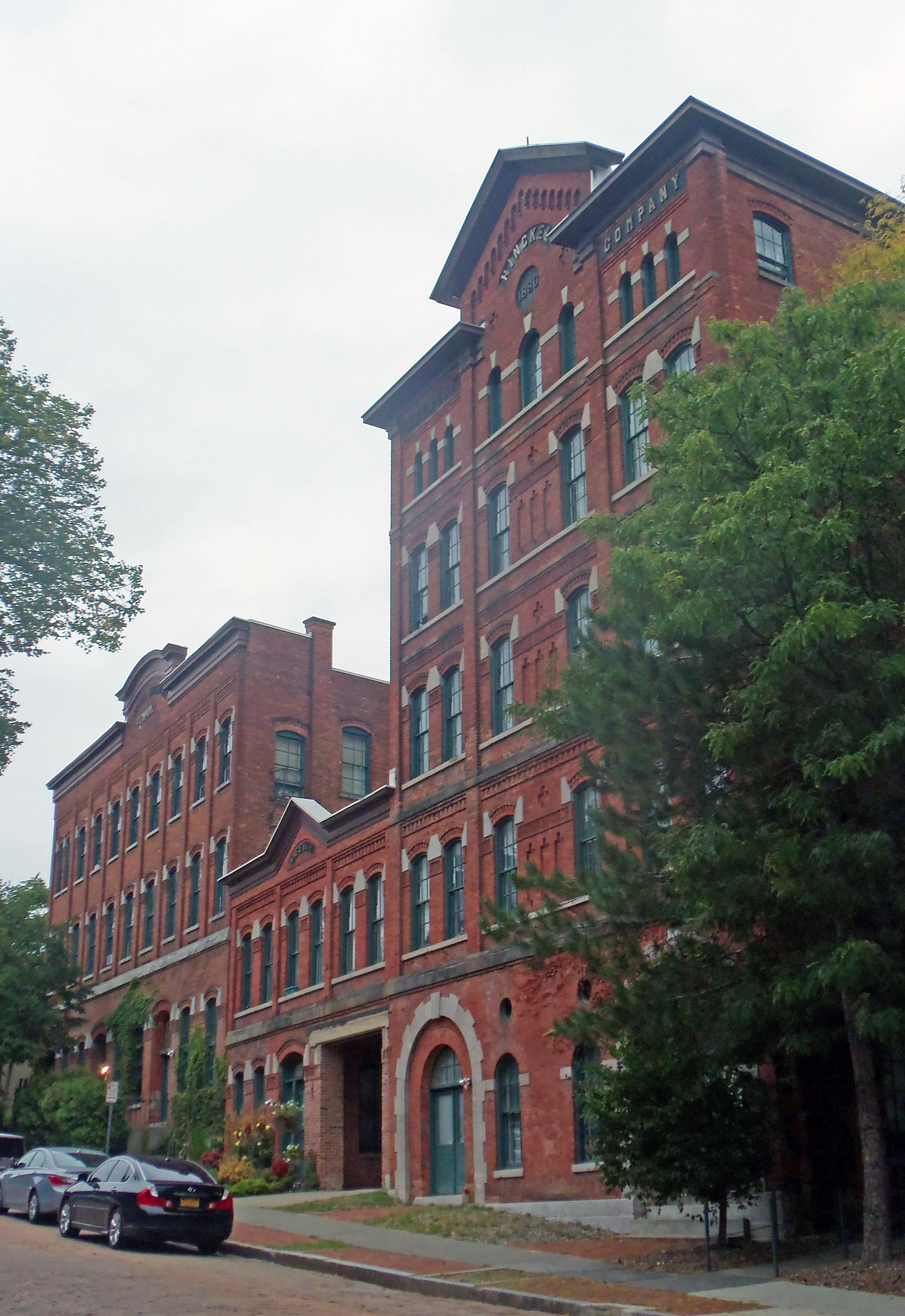
The Hinckel Brewery in Albany was built in 1880 and is now an apartment complex.

New York State, one of the fifty states of the United States of America, is home to more than 320 beer breweries, as well as numerous brewpubs and bars. Throughout the last decade, the consumption of craft beer has grown to be a part of the state's culture. The following is a partial list of breweries located in the state. The list includes not only breweries of beer but also of sake.

== Breweries ==
List of Breweries in New York State
Name	City	County	Year Established	Products	Notes
Abandon Brewing Company	Penn Yan	Yates	2013	Taproom	
Adirondack Brewery	Lake George	Warren	1999	Bottles; brewpub	
Barrage Brewing Company	Farmingdale	Nassau	2014	Taproom	Permanently Closed
Barrier Brewing Company	Oceanside	Nassau	2010	Bottles, cans, taproom	
Big Alice Brewing	Long Island City, New York City	Queens	2013	Bottles, taproom	
Big Ditch Brewing Company	Buffalo	Erie	2014	Cans, taproom	
Birdhouse Brewing Company	Honeoye	Ontario	2020	Taproom	
Blue Point Brewing Company	Patchogue	Suffolk	1998	Bottles, cans, taproom	Acquired by Anheuser-Busch InBev in 2014
Brewery Ommegang	Cooperstown	Otsego	1997	Bottles, brewpub	Acquired by Duvel Moortgat Brewery in 2003
Bridge and Tunnel Brewery	Ridgewood, Queens, New York City	Queens	2012	Cans, taproom	Opened in Maspeth, Queens in 2012; moved to Ridgewood and added a taproom in 2015.
Bronx Brewery	The Bronx, New York City	Bronx	2014	Cans, taproom	
Brooklyn Brewery	Williamsburg, Brooklyn, New York City	Kings	1988	Bottles, cans, taproom	
Brooklyn Kura	Sunset Park, Brooklyn, New York City	Kings	2018	Taproom	First sake brewery in New York State
Buffalo RiverWorks	Buffalo	Erie	2015	Brewery, restaurant, mixed-use event venue	
Callicoon Brewing Company	Callicoon	Sullivan	2013	Taproom	
Captain Lawrence Brewing Company	Elmsford	Westchester	2006	Bottles, brewpub	Opened in Pleasantville in 2006; moved to Elmsford in 2012
Community Beer Works	Buffalo	Erie	2012	Cans, kegs, taproom	
Coney Island Brewing Company	Coney Island, Brooklyn, New York City	Kings	2007	Bottles, taproom	Once the world's smallest commercial brewery; moved to a new location in 2015. Sold by Shmaltz Brewing Company to Sam Adams in 2013
Crooked Ladder Brewing Company	Riverhead	Suffolk	2013	Taproom	Permanently Closed
DaleView Biscuits and Beer	Flatbush, Brooklyn, New York City	Kings	2018	Brewpub	
Defiant Brewing Company	Pearl River	Rockland	2006	Brewpub, bottles	
Dundee Brewing Company	Rochester	Monroe	1994	Bottles, cans	Part of the Genesee Brewing Company
Ellicottville Brewing Company	Ellicottville, Bemus Point, and Fredonia	Chautauqua	1994	Bottles, brewpubs	
Fifth Frame Brewing Company	Rochester	Monroe	2017	Cans, crowlers, coffee, taproom	
Finback Brewery	Ridgewood, New York City	Queens	2014	Taproom	
Flagship Brewing Company	Staten Island, New York City	Richmond	2014	Bottles, taproom	
Flying Bison Brewing Company	Buffalo	Erie	2000	Bottles, taproom	
Froth Brewing Company	Buffalo	Erie	2019	Taproom	
Genesee Brewing Company	Rochester	Monroe	1878	Bottles, cans, brewpub	One of the oldest breweries in the U.S. now owned by North American Breweries
Great South Bay Brewery	Bay Shore	Suffolk	2009	Bottles, taproom	
Greenpoint Beer & Ale Company	Greenpoint, New York City	Kings	2014	Taproom	Co-located with the Dirck the Norseman restaurant
Grimm Artisanal Ales	Williamsburg, New York City	Kings	2018	Taproom	
Gun Hill Brewing Company	Williamsbridge, New York City	Bronx	2014	Cans	
Industrial Arts Brewing Company	Garnerville	Rockland	2016	Cans, taproom	Opened by Jeff O'Neil, co-founder of Ithaca Beer Company
Interboro Spirits & Ales	East Williamsburg, Brooklyn, New York City	Kings	2016	Brewery and distillery, taproom	
Ithaca Beer Company	Ithaca	Tompkins	1997	Brewery	Their Flower Power IPA is often credited as "one of the first West Coast-style IPAs brewed in the Northeast"
Iron Tug Brewing	Rochester	Monroe	2016	Cans, crowlers, taproom	
Keegan Ales	Kingston	Ulster	2003	Bottles, brewpub	
Keg & Lantern Brewing Company	Greenpoint, Brooklyn, New York City	Kings	2014	Brewpub	
Kings County Brewers Collective	Troutman, Brooklyn, New York City	Kings	2016	Cans, taproom	
Kuka Andean Brewing Company	Blauvelt	Rockland		Bottles	Makers of beer brewed with maca root and other Mesoamerican plants
Lafayette Brewing Company	Buffalo	Erie	2012	Brewery, restaurant	Opened in 2012 as the Pan American Grill & Brewery, renamed to Lafayette Brewing in 2017
LIC Beer Project	Long Island City, New York City	Queens	2015	Cans, taproom	
Long Ireland Beer Company	Riverhead	Suffolk	2011	Bottles, taproom	
Matt Brewing Company	Utica	Oneida	1888	Brewery	One of the oldest breweries in the U.S. and makers of Saranac beer
Mortalis Brewing Company	Avon	Livingston	2018	Cans, bottles, crowlers	
New York Beer Project (NYBP)	Lockport and Victor	Niagara and Ontario	2015	Bottles, brewpub	
Other Half Brewing Company	Carroll Gardens, New York City and Bloomfield	Kings and Ontario	2014	Cans, taproom	Brooklyn location opened in 2014, Bloomfield location opened in 2019
Paradox Brewery	North Hudson	Essex	2013	Brewery, taproom	In the heart of the Adirondack Mountains
Pearl Street Grill & Brewery	Buffalo	Erie	1997	Brewery, restaurant	
Red Shed Brewing	Cooperstown and Cherry Valley	Otsego	2015	Brewery, taproom, cans, kegs, growlers	
Reinvention Brewing Company	Manchester	Ontario	2017	Brewery	
Resurgence Brewing Company	Buffalo	Erie	2016	Brewery and taprooms	
Rockaway Brewing Company	Long Island City, New York City	Queens	2012	Brewery, taprooms	Production brewery and taproom in Long Island City opened in 2012, and taproom in Arverne, Queens opened in 2016
Rohrbach Brewing Company	Rochester	Monroe County	1991	Cans, two brewpubs	
Shmaltz Brewing Company	Clifton Park	Saratoga	1996	Bottles, taproom	Makers of He'Brew Beer that was contract brewed until they opened their own brewery in 2013, but returned to contract brewing in 2019 after selling the brewery to SingleCut Beersmiths
SingleCut Beersmiths	Astoria, New York City	Queens	2012	Bottles, cans, taproom	
Sixpoint Brewery	Red Hook, New York City	Kings	2004	Cans, taproom	
Sloop Brewing Company	Elizaville and East Fishkill	Columbia and Dutchess	2015	Cans, draft, taproom	East Fishkill location opened in 2018
South Shore Craft Brewery	Oceanside	Nassau	2018	Cans, draft, taproom	
Southern Tier Brewing Company	Lakewood	Chautauqua	2002	Bottles, brewpub, cans	Production brewery in Lakewood, brewpubs in Lakewood, Cleveland, Ohio and in Pittsburgh, Pennsylvania
Strong Rope Brewery	Gowanus, Brooklyn, New York City	Kings	2015	Taproom	
Three Heads Brewing	Rochester	Monroe	2016	Cans, taproom	Originally started in the early 2000s and was co-located with CB Craft Brewers, current location opened in 2016
Threes Brewing	Gowanus, Brooklyn, New York City	Kings	2014	Bottles, brewpub	
Transmitter Brewing	Brooklyn Navy Yard, New York City	Kings	2014	Bottles, cans, kegs, beer garden, taproom	Original location was in Long Island City, Queens and the brewery relocated to the Brooklyn Navy Yard in May 2019.
Upstate Brewing Company	Elmira	Chemung	2012	Cans, taproom	
Upward Brewing Company	Livingston Manor	Sullivan	2019	Cans, Taproom	
War Horse Brewing Company	Geneva	Ontario	2008	Cans, taproom	
Wood Kettle Brewing	Greece	Monroe	2017	Taproom	
Yonkers Brewing Company	Yonkers	Westchester	2015		Located at the former Yonkers Trolley Barn

== Closed Breweries ==
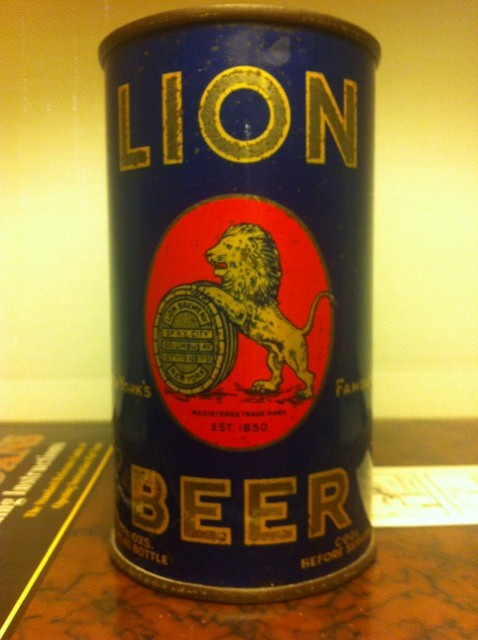
A Lion Beer Can from 1936

Peter Doelgers Brewery using a General Vehicle Company truck (1910)

- A. Finck & Son's Brewery - Manhattan, New York City
- Beverwyck Brewery – Albany
- Central Brewing Company – Manhattan, New York City
- Chelsea Craft Brewing Company – brewpub; opened in Chelsea, Manhattan, New York City in 1995; moved to the Bronx, New York City in 2016, but closed in 2017.
- Consumers Brewing Company – Manhattan, New York City
- Dobler Brewing Company – Albany
- Ebling Brewing Company – The Bronx, New York City
- Empire Brewing Company – Syracuse – bottles, brewpub, opened in 1994, close in 2019. Intellectual properties acquired by Ellicottville Brewing Company.
- F. & M. Schaefer Brewing Company – Manhattan, New York City
- Folksbier Brewery - Carroll Gardens, Brooklyn, New York City - Brooklyn, Kings - kegs, cans, taproom – opened 2014, closed October 2021
- George Ehret Hell Gate Brewery – Manhattan, New York City
- George Ringler and Company Brewery – Manhattan, New York City
- Haffen Brewing Company – The Bronx, New York City
- Hedrick Brewery – Albany
- Henry Elias Brewing Company – Manhattan, New York City
- Hinckel Brewery – Albany
- Jacob Hoffman Brewing Company – Manhattan, New York City
- Jacob Ruppert and Company Brewery – Manhattan, New York City
- Joseph Doelgers Sons Brewery – Manhattan, New York City
- Joseph Fallert Brewery - Williamsburg, Brooklyn, New York City
- Kips Bay Brewing Company – Manhattan, New York City
- Lion Brewery – Manhattan, New York City – In 1895, it was the sixth-largest brewery in the United States. Closed in 1944.
- Mander's Brewery – Elmira, NY 1856 - 1920
- Manhattan Brewing Company – Manhattan, New York City
- Nedloh Brewing Company – Bloomfield – bottles, taproom, opened in 2014, closed in 2017. Space is currently occupied by Other Half Brewing.
- North American Brewing Company - 1306 Greene, Hamburg (Wilson) & Myrtle Avenue, Brooklyn, NY.
- Peter Doelgers Brewery – Manhattan, New York City
- Piels Beer – East New York, Brooklyn, New York City
- Rheingold Beer – Bushwick, Brooklyn, New York City
- Stouthearted Brewing – Lansing – brewpub, opened in 2011, closed in 2016
- West Utica Brewery – Utica
- William Ulmer Brewery – Bushwick, Brooklyn, New York City

== Other beer companies ==
- North American Breweries is based in Rochester and owns the Genesee Brewing Company, Pyramid Breweries, Magic Hat Brewing Company, and Portland Brewing Company. They are also the U.S. importer for the Labatt Brewing Company. North American Breweries is owned by Cerveceria Costa Rica, a subsidiary of Florida Ice and Farm Company.

== See also ==
- Beer in the United States
- List of breweries in the United States
- List of microbreweries
