= Experimental beer =

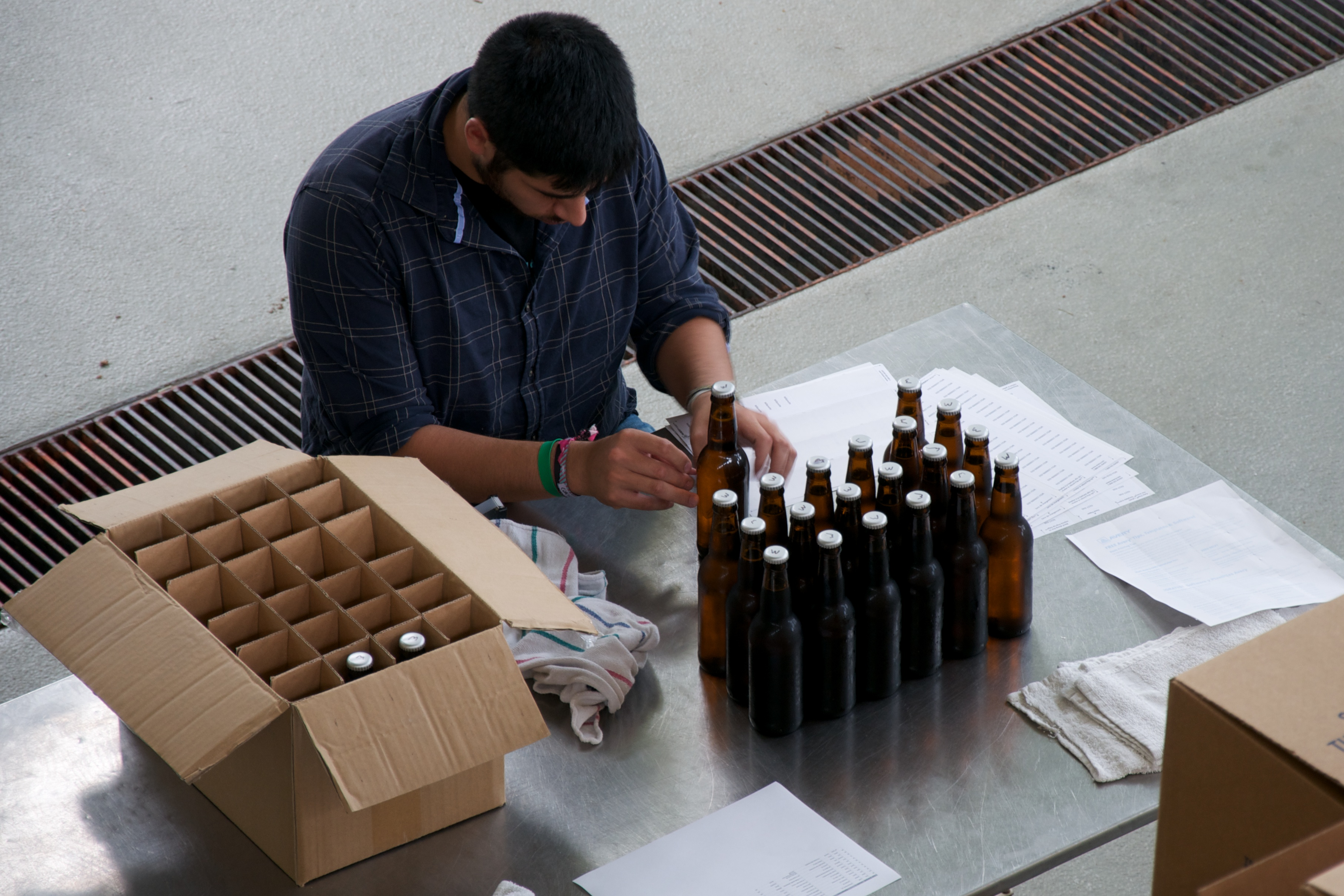
A person labeling experimental beer at the fermentation lab at Oregon State University

Experimental beer is beer that is produced in or as a new style, using a new recipe, or as a type of beer that does not fit within present beer style criteria or definitions. The term also encompasses minor beer styles that are not covered under any of the Beer Judge Certification Program (BJCP) categories, with the exception of Belgian beers. Such minor beer styles may serve "as an incubator" for new potential categories, and may attain an official category if the style becomes of interest to the general public at a sufficient level. The Great American Beer Festival has an experimental beer category as a part of its competition, for which awards are given, as does the World Beer Cup, which also provides awards for beers in this category. The Oregon State Fair has a home brew competition that includes a category for specialty and experimental beers.

== Production ==
Experimental beer may be produced using preparation methods used in craft brewing. Some homebrewers produce experimental beers in efforts to devise unique or flavorful new styles. Some commercial breweries and microbreweries produce experimental beer and offer it to consumers.

The Boston Beer Company, based in Boston, Massachusetts, has produced several experimental beers at their research and development facility Jamaica Plain, Boston, and operates a unique ten-gallon brewery for their production. The company's Triple Bock bottled under the Samuel Adams brand has been described as an experimental beer, which was only released in 1994, 1995, and 1997.

BrewDog, a brewery in Ellon, Aberdeenshire, Scotland, has produced experimental beers.

Dogfish Head Brewery, based in Milton, Delaware, has produced a beer named Bitches Brew that has been described as an experimental beer, which is named after the album Bitches Brew by Miles Davis. Some of the ingredients used include unfiltered raw Ethiopian honey, Mauritian brown sugar and "load of dark, roasty grains to balance the sweetness of the honey."

Founders Brewing Company, a craft brewery in Grand Rapids, Michigan, has brewed several experimental beers through the years under the name of Backstage Series beers, including Blushing Monk, an experimental Belgian-style raspberry ale, which the company re-released in December 2014.

Kuhnhenn Brewing Company in Warren, Michigan produces experimental beers in small batches, such as their K12 Experimental IPA, which is brewed using experimental hops that are grown in Leonard, Michigan.

Matilda Bay Brewing Company in Dandenong South, Victoria, Australia has produced experimental beers.

Short's Brewing Company has produced experimental beers such as OMGWTFBBQ, a "barbecue themed experimental beer brewed with tomatoes, brown sugar, molasses, spices, and smoked hops."

In 2011, Vanberg & DeWulf's Lambrucha experimental beer won the gold medal in the experimental beer category at the U.S. Open Beer Championships.

=== Hemp beer ===
Some experimental beers may use unique ingredients that are not traditionally used in beer production, such as hemp seeds. The Lexington Brewing Company in the U.S. state of Kentucky has produced a hemp beer. Hilliard's Beer, a brewery in Seattle, Washington and Redhook Ale Brewery, a brewery in Woodinville, Washington jointly produced a beer named Joint Effort. The beer was created after marijuana was legalized for personal use in the U.S. state of Washington.

== Based upon existent beer styles ==
Experimental beers may expound upon existing beer styles in various ways.

=== Ale ===
Hemp seeds have been used to produce hemp ales. Diamond Knot Brewing Company in the U.S. state of Washington and Firestone Walker Brewing Company in the U.S. state of California both produce hemp ales. The Firestone Walker Brewing Company's version was originally called Humboldt Hemp Ale, and was originally produced in Arcata, California, by Mario Celotto, a former football player for the Oakland Raiders.

=== India pale ale ===
Experimental India pale ale (IPA) beers that are produced and marketed to consumers include Belgian-style IPA, Session IPA/India session ale, Wild IPA, red IPA, herbed/spiced IPA and white IPA. Wild IPA beer production may utilize brettanomyces yeast during the primary or secondary fermentation process. Its use may produce a tropical flavor with pineapple-flavored notes.

=== Lager ===
The Shmaltz Brewing Company in the U.S. state of New York has produced several experimental craft lager beers.

=== Wheat beer ===
Experimental styles of American wheat beer have been produced by craft brewers that incorporate various fruits into the beer. Some have produced wheat beer that is further flavored with hops.

== Historical anecdotes ==
In 1773, during the voyage of James Cook's HMS Resolution, crew members referred to the beer on board the ship that was prepared from malt as "experimental beer." They also referred to other items and people as "experimental", regarding things that the sailors considered as "...not to be quite in the common way of a man of war," or "out of the ordinary." Expressions included "experimental beef", pertaining to a new type of salted beef, "experimental water", pertaining to the drinking water distilled from seawater, and "experimental gentleman", in reference to some of the people aboard the ship during that time.

== See also ==
- List of beer styles
- Seasonal beer

== Bibliography ==
- Beechum, D.; Conn, D. (2014). Experimental Homebrewing: Mad Science in the Pursuit of Great Beer. Voyageur Press. ISBN 978-0-7603-4538-2.
