= Vanberg & DeWulf =

American Belgian beer importer

Vanberg & DeWulf was an American importation business that brought premium Belgian beer to the United States. Its portfolio was purchased by Total Beverage Solution.

== History ==
Vanberg & DeWulf was established in 1982 by Donald Feinberg, and in 1990 his wife, Wendy Littlefield, joined him as a partner in the business. Vanberg & DeWulf has worked exclusively with breweries that are independent, family-run and artisanal in their approach. Vanberg & DeWulf started by offering some of what are now familiar names in Belgian brewing: Duvel first, followed quickly by Castelain, Rodenbach, Kwak, Blanche de Bruges, Affligem, Frank Boon's lambics, Dubuisson, Dupont, and Slaghmuylder. They brought French Bieres de Gardes to the US market, first with Jenlain and then Brasserie Castelain.

In 1996, Vanberg & DeWulf opened Brewery Ommegang in Cooperstown, New York, with Duvel Moortgat and Scaldis. Brewery Ommegang was the first brewery in the US dedicated to Belgian-style all bottle-conditioned, cork-finished beers. In 2003, Duvel Moortgat purchased Vanberg & DeWulf's majority stake in Ommegang as well as Vanberg & DeWulf's import rights to import Duvel beers.

Following the sale of Ommegang, Feinberg rebuilt the remaining portfolio over the next five years.

In 2011, Vanberg & DeWulf celebrated 30 years of bringing Belgian beers to the United States with the Coast-to-Coast-Toast, a nationwide promotion of Belgian beer. 350 of the top Belgian beer accounts in the United States participated in the event, in conjunction with Untappd. Vanberg & DeWulf has since celebrated the Coast-to-Coast Toast annually in November as a celebration of craft and family-run breweries, and it has become the largest one-day celebration of craft and specialty beer culture in the country.

In 2014, its portfolio was purchased by Total Beverage Solution.

== Beers ==
Vanberg & DeWulf imported forty-three beers from eleven breweries in four countries representing more than twenty styles, mostly Belgian or Belgian-influenced. The company represented beers brewed by:

Belgian Classic Brewers:

- Geuzestekkerij DeCam – (Gooik, Belgium)
- Brasserie Dubuisson (Pipaix, Belgium)
- Brasserie Dupont (Tourpes, Belgium)
- Brouwerij Slaghmuylder (Ninove, Belgium)
- Brouwerij Dilewyns (Dendermonde, Belgium)

The Vanberg & DeWulf “Honorary Belgian Beer” collection of beers includes:

- Brasserie Castelain (Benifontaine, France) Bieres de Gardes
- Amiata Birrificio Artigianale (Arcidosso, Italy)
- Brewery Olvisholt (Iceland)
- Green Jack Brewing Company (UK)
- Borg Brugghús (Iceland)

== Awards & accomplishments ==
- Vanberg & DeWulf published the first US edition of Michael Jackson’s The Great Beers of Belgium in 1995 – now in its 6th printing. They worked closely with Ruth Van Waerebeke the Belgian chef and writer who authored Everybody Eats Well in Belgium, a standard reference for US chefs.
- Don Feinberg and Wendy Littlefield were the first Americans inducted into the Belgian Brewers Guild in its history.
- Feinberg and Littlefield were both nominated for the Mercurius Award, the highest civilian honor given by the Belgium government for the promotion of Belgium abroad, in the late 1990s.
- V&D import Scheldebrouwerij Hop Ruiter won the Gold Medal at the World Beer Championships on January 16, 2012.
- Feinberg and Littlefield were nominated as semi-finalists for a James Beard Foundation Award in 2013 for Outstanding Wine, Spirits, or Beer Professional, the first beer importers to ever be nominated for the award.
- In 2011, V&D's own Lambrucha, a combination of lambic and kombucha tea, was named the Best Experimental Beer of the year at the U.S. Open Beer Championships.
- In 2014, V&D import Bush de Nuits (Scaldis Prestige de Nuits) was named one of the 100 Top Beers in the World by RateBeer.com.

Many of the beers imported by Vanberg & DeWulf have received World Beer Cup Awards, including three silver, six gold, and one platinum medal in 2012. In 2013, their own Vanberg et Famille Lambickx De Troch scored a 98 and earned a platinum medal.
