= Dobler Brewing Company =

- Industry: Alcoholic beverage
- Founded: 1865
- Headquarters: Albany, New York; United States
- Products: Beer
- Owner: John S. Dobler

The Dobler Brewing Company was a small regional brewery, located in Albany, New York—at the time the largest brewing hub in the country. Dobler was founded in 1865, and had an annual capacity of 25,000 barrels during its height.

The brewery was one of only three breweries (along with Hedrick and Beverwyck) in Albany to survive Prohibition; Dobler was equipped with refrigeration capabilities in order to produce their line of lager, allowing them to convert to soda production. However, they never regained national distribution post-Prohibition. The Dobler Brewery closed in 1960, shortly after being sold to Hampden-Harvard Breweries of Willimansett, Massachusetts. The main building where the brewery once stood was demolished in 1960. However, an adjacent building which served as the carriage house for the delivery horses still stands.

== See also ==
- List of breweries in New York
- Beer in the United States
- List of defunct breweries in the United States
