= Coney Island Brewing Co. =

Craft brewery.based on Brooklyn, New York

Coordinates: 40°34′30.1″N 73°59′2″W

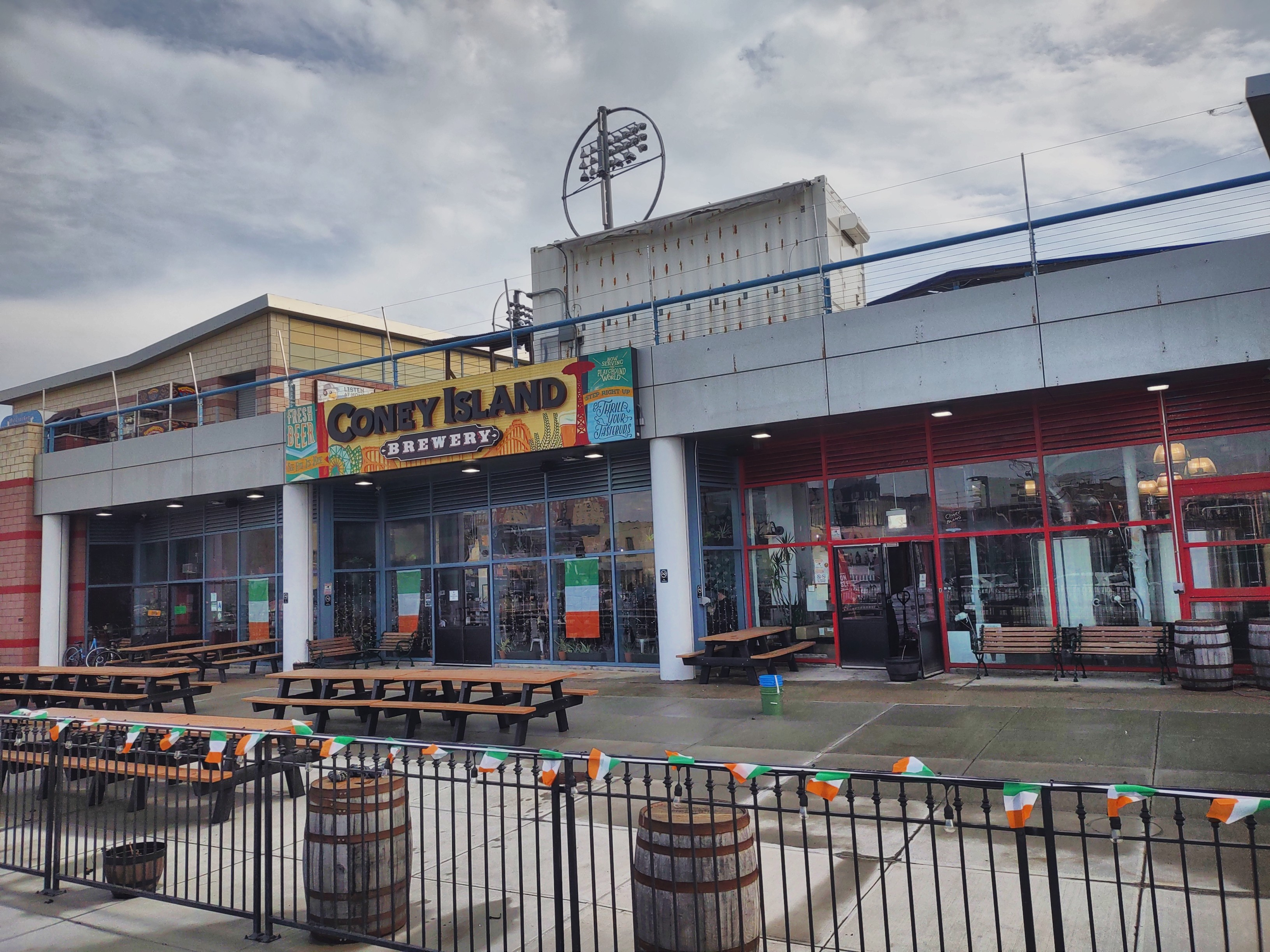
- Industry: Brewing
- Headquarters: Brooklyn, New York, United States
- Products: Beer
- Owner: Boston Beer Company
- Website: coneyislandbeer.com

Coney Island Brewing Co. is a Brooklyn-based craft brewery owned by Boston Beer Company.

== History ==
Founded in 2007, the brewery was "the world's smallest brewery," operating out of Coney Island USA's Freakatorium, yielding one gallon of beer per batch brewed.

The brewery was folded into Boston Beer Company when Alchemy & Science, a subsidiary of the latter, purchased Shmaltz Brewing Company in 2013. A new brewery and taproom opened in 2015 at Maimonides Park, after the previous location at Coney Island was devastated by Hurricane Sandy in 2012.

The company ceased production of its hard root beer, hard ginger ale, and hard orange cream ale in 2018, choosing to focus on craft beer. Its flagship line of Mermaid Pilsner, Merman NY IPA, and Beach Beer is available in thirteen states.

In November 2023, the company closed its Maimonides Park taproom, citing the seasonality of the area and a lack of profitability, though its beers continue to be distributed.
