= Lion Brewery (New York City) =

Beer brewery, 1857–1944

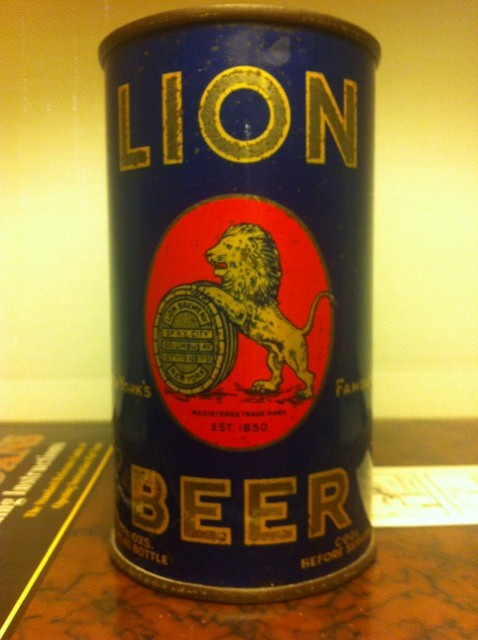
Lion Beer Can 1936

Lion Brewing was a New York City-based brewery established in 1857; it closed in 1944. In 1895, it was the sixth-largest brewery in the United States.

== Background ==
Shortly after immigrating to the United States, Swiss-German August Schmid and Emanuel Bernheimer founded the Costanz Brewery at East 4th Street near Avenue B in 1850. The brewery produced a lagered beer, a favorite among German immigrants. By 1852, they built a second Costanz Brewery at Four Corners in Staten Island, home to a large German community. Five years later, Bernheimer became the partner of another German immigrant, James Speyers and founded the Lion Brewery in 1857 in Manhattan Valley.

A group of Catholic Bavarians helped build the Lion Brewery. When it was built, they held masses in the brewery on Sunday mornings.

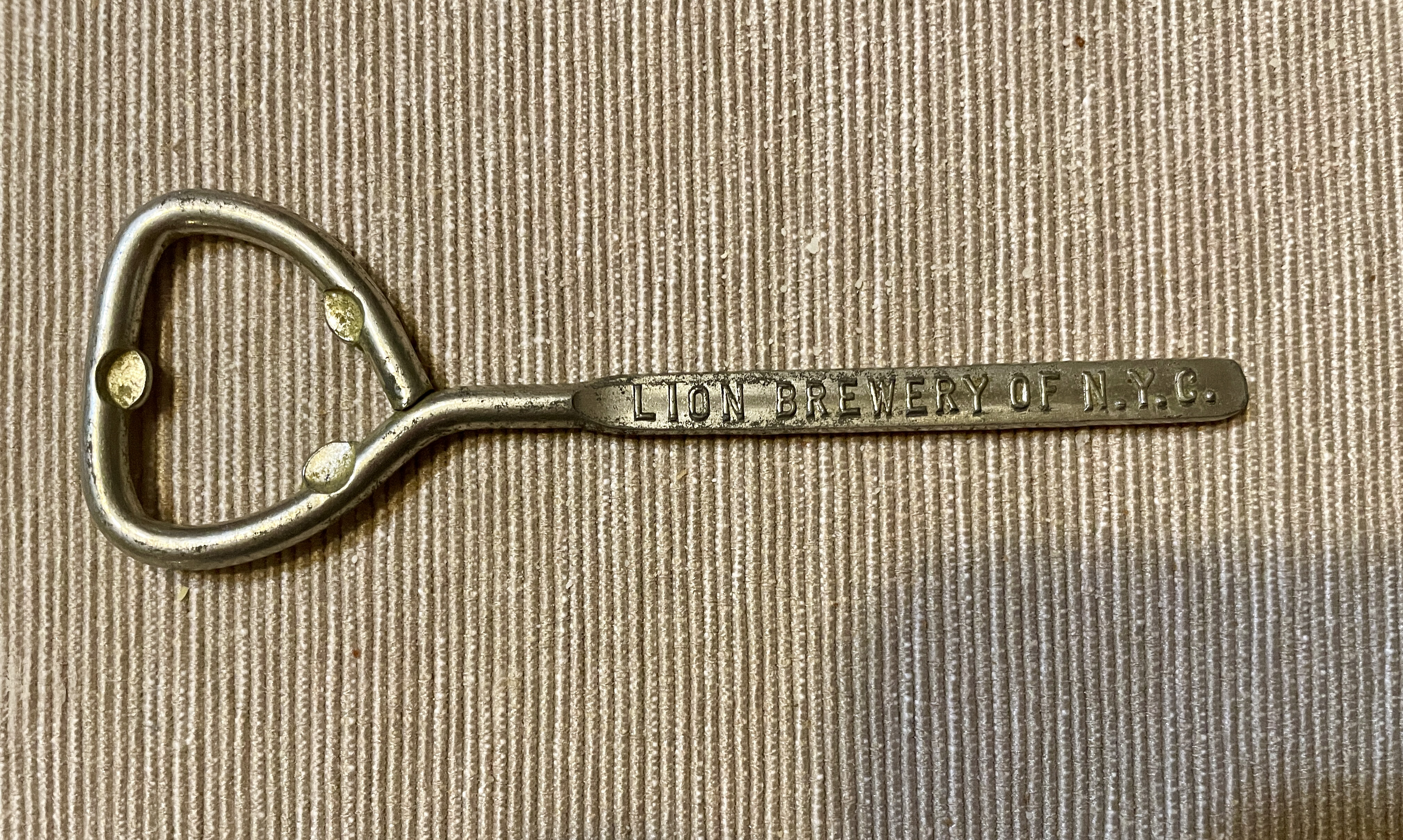
Promotional bottle opener stamped "Lion Brewery N.Y.C." Date unknown.

== History ==
At its peak, the Lion Brewery occupied about six square city blocks, from Central Park West to Amsterdam Avenue and from 107th to 109th Street. At the time Manhattan's Upper West Side was an open area with inexpensive land housing, many public institutions and an insane asylum. There were about five to ten thousand living in shanties after being displaced by the creation of Central Park in 1859. Consequently, with the brewery and surrounding areas, the Upper West Side failed to increase its real estate value until the early twentieth century. The property included a large beer garden—Lion Park—and, later, a hall known as Lion Palace. In 1862, a $1 tax on each barrel of beer hurt small brewers but not Lion. The anti-saloon movement in the late 19th and early 20th century encouraged Lion to clean up its own saloons.

By 1889, Schmid was the principal owner of Lion Brewer. Schmid died on June 4, 1889, leaving his wife Josephine Kleiner Schmid a life interest in one third of his estate. By 1909, Josephine Schmid had become sole owner of the brewery, which was valued at $5,000,000; she had also made many shrewd real estate investments and was worth "nearly $10,000,000". She married the Prince del Drago in 1909, and called herself the Princess Del Drago, despite not actually holding the title.

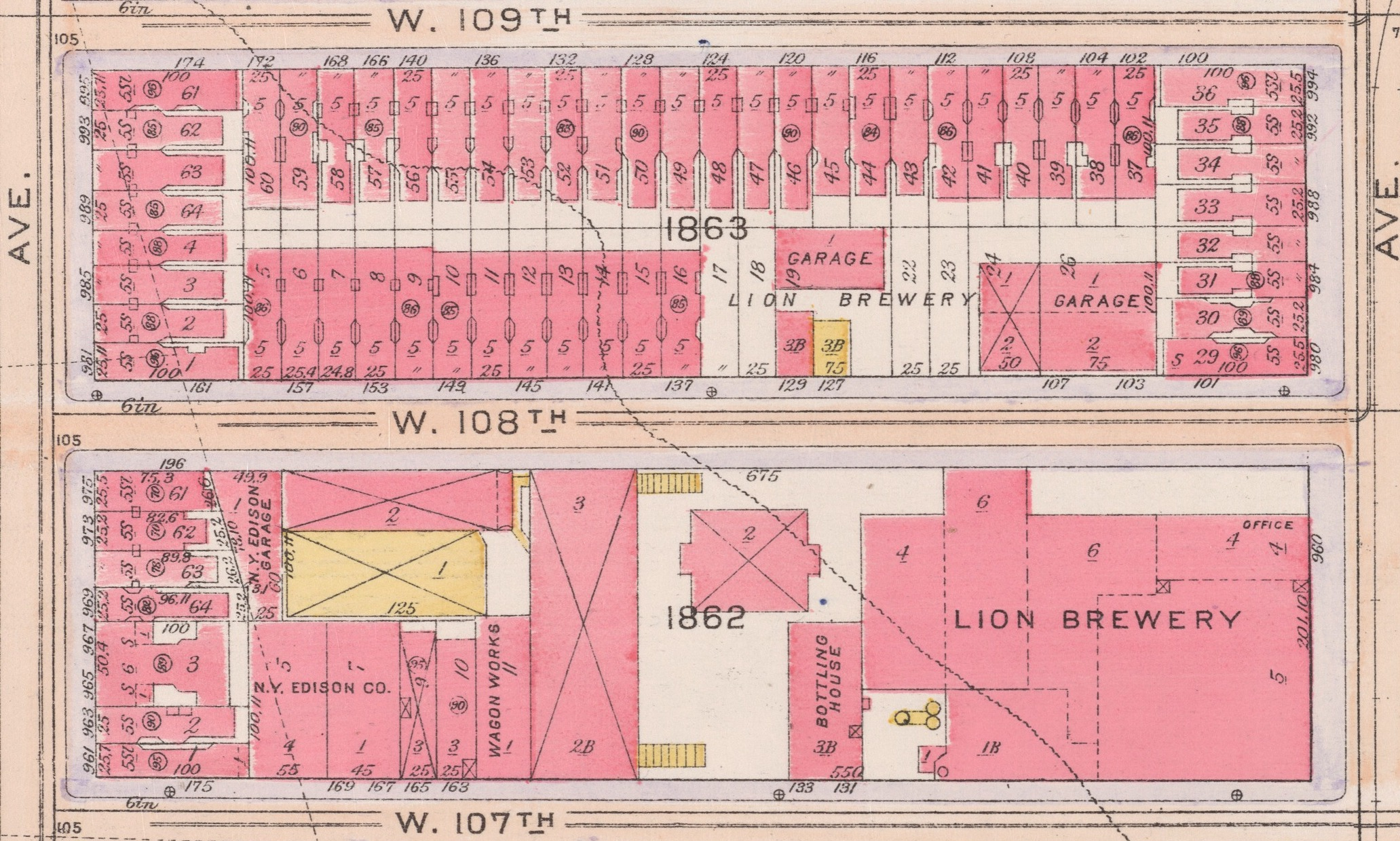
"LION BREWERY" with bottling house and garage map in 1916 Manhattan

Lion Brewery got caught up in a wave of mergers and closings among some of the smaller New York Brewers in the early 1940s which continued until 1941, when the business closed. The brewery (including the canning facilities) was auctioned off on August 26, 1943. The plant was demolished in 1944 and more than 3,000 tons of steel were taken from the original brewery structure and recycled for the war effort.

After the Brewery was knocked down the lot was paved over with cinders. On Sundays, after the war, returning World War II Veterans formed a softball league and played almost every Sunday afternoon. Home plate was located near 107th street and Columbus Avenue. Today, apartment houses, small businesses, and a Junior High School occupy the brewery's former location.

Around 1860, the brewery published a pamphlet titled "Observations on Brewing and Beer: With an Analysis and Scientific Testimony Relative to the Lager Beer of the Speyers' Lion Brewery". The pamphlet had a short history of the different kinds of beer, and an analysis showing that their lager beer was pure. The pamphlet also included some great line drawings of the brewery complex.

== See also ==
- List of breweries in New York
