= Short's Brewing Company =

Michigan-based brewery and brewpub

- Industry: Alcoholic beverage
- Founded: 2004
- Founder: Joe Short
- Headquarters: Bellaire, Michigan, Elk Rapids, Michigan, United States
- Area served: Michigan
- Products: Beer
- Production output: 34,443 Barrels (2014)
- Website: www.shortsbrewing.com

Short's Brewing Company is a brewpub and microbrewery that opened in 2004 in Bellaire, Michigan with locations in Elk Rapids, Michigan and Traverse City in summer 2027. Short's is widely regarded for wild and experimental beers, and for their flagship products like Local's Light Lager, Huma Lupa Licious IPA, and Thirst Mutilator Non-Alcoholic Hop Water.

== History ==
Short's Brewing Company was registered as a business in 2002 with the State of Michigan by 22-year-old Joe Short.

In 2003, a 100-year-old empty hardware store in Bellaire was refurbished for use as a brewpub. The pub opened on April 26, 2004, initially housing a seven barrel brewing system utilizing five fermenters and five serving tanks. First year production totaled 178 barrels. During the fall of 2006, Short began work on The Imperial Beer Series. By 2007 the 13 series beers were released, each one with its own trading card and story. The pub offers space for community gatherings, local art, and live performance. The pub has 20 beers and Starcut Ciders on tap.

Short's purchased an old manufacturing building in Elk Rapids in January 2008 to accommodate larger scale batches separate from the brewing done on-site at the brewpub. The first Elk Rapids batch of beer was brewed in January 2009. With the Elk Rapids warehouse facilities, production capacity increased to 30,000 barrels per year. The bottling line is designed to process 800 cases per day.

In 2014, the company set a Guinness World Record for the largest tap takeover when it served 120 Short's beers for the opening of HopCat's new location in Detroit, Michigan. In 2014 the company produced 34,443 barrels.

In July 2017, Short's sold 19.9% of the company to Lagunitas Brewing Company, which is owned by Heineken International.

== Production site ==
The Elk Rapids production site is a 30-barrel brewhouse. The site has 21 fermenters and 6 bright tanks. Short's beer is brewed with natural ingredients and is unfiltered. Every bottled product and some kegs are flash pasteurized. The production site is geared to brew and package 56 different beers in 2014.

== Availability ==
The beer is distributed mostly in Michigan, and is sold in over 3,200 locations statewide. In addition to its year-round "flagship" brews, it bottles over 40 seasonal and specialty beers annually. In January 2016, Short's announced that it would expand its distribution territory for both brands (Short's Brew and Starcut Ciders) to include additional states. In March 2016, Short's began distribution in Indiana and Ohio markets through Cavalier Distributing. In January 2019, Short's partnered with Cavalier Distributing in the Orlando metropolitan area and J.J. Taylor Distributing in the Tampa metropolitan area to bring Short's brews to Florida.

== Awards ==
2009 Great American Beer Festival

- Bloody Beer - Silver Medal - Experimental Beer

2010 RateBeer Best Beers In The World

- #64 - 100 Best Brewers in The World
- #5 - 50 Best Brewpubs

2010 Great American Beer Festival

- Key Lime Pie - Gold Medal - Experimental Beer

2010 World Beer Cup

- Black Licorice Lager - Bronze Medal - Herb & Spice Beer or Chocolate Beer

2011 Draft Magazine Top 25 Beers of the Year

- The Gambler

2014 Great American Beer Festival

- Key Lime Pie - Gold Medal - Experimental Beer

2015 Great American Beer Festival

- Melt My Brain - Silver Medal - Experimental Beer

2025 Great American Beer Festival

- Hot Loins - Silver Medal - Experimental Beer

2026 Great American Beer Festival

- Summer Heat - Silver Medal - Experimental Beer
