= Kuhnhenn Brewing Company =

The Kuhnhenn Brewing Company is a small microbrewery, winery and meadery in Warren, Michigan, United States. They have several beers rated in the top 100 in the world on beeradvocate.com and ratebeer.com. The business was established in 1998, but did not open its doors until 2001, by owners and brewers, the brothers Bret and Eric Kuhnhenn.

The brewery sits on the corner of Mound and Chicago Road in the old Lutz hardware store which is owned by the Kuhnhenn family. The brothers started homebrewing when Eric went to college and was introduced to it. He brought the hobby home and introduced it to his brother Bret. Bret started selling homebrewing supplies from the hardware store and soon it became more profitable than selling hardware. The hardware component of the establishment did not disappear from the brewery until mid-2006.

The brewery uses converted equipment, the lauter tun was a peanut butter hopper from Quaker Oats cereal, the mash/boil kettle was a yeast starter for a sour dough bread company, their pilot system's kettle was a 100-gallon coffee maker. They have a six kettle brew on the premises that allows them to make experimental beers.

The beers include Raspberry Eisbock, Winter Wonder Lager, Fourth Dementia, DRIPA and Simcoe Silly. The brothers brew about 80 different beers; most of these beers are small batches made for annual events. Kuhnhenn's is also known for brewing seasonal and experimental strong beers.

Kuhnhenn Brewing Co. won a gold medal at the a World a Beer Cup for DRIPA (Double Rice IPA).

A satellite brewery (larger than the original, and with increased bottling capacity) has opened at 36000 Groesbeck Highway Clinton Township, Michigan 48035.
