= De Koninck Brewery =

Belgian brewery

Coordinates: 51°11′59″N 4°24′54″E

Brouwerij De Koninck
- .
- Location: Antwerp, Belgium
- Opened: 1833
- Owned by: Duvel Moortgat Brewery
- Website: http://www.dekoninck.com/

Active beers
Name	Type
De Koninck	Special Belge
De Koninck Triple d'Anvers	Tripel, Blond
De Koninck Wild Jo	Brett Beer

Seasonal beers
Name	Type
Winterkoninck	Belgian Ale

Other beers
Name	Type
Gusto Golden Blond	Blond
Gusto Ruby Red	Belgian Pale Ale

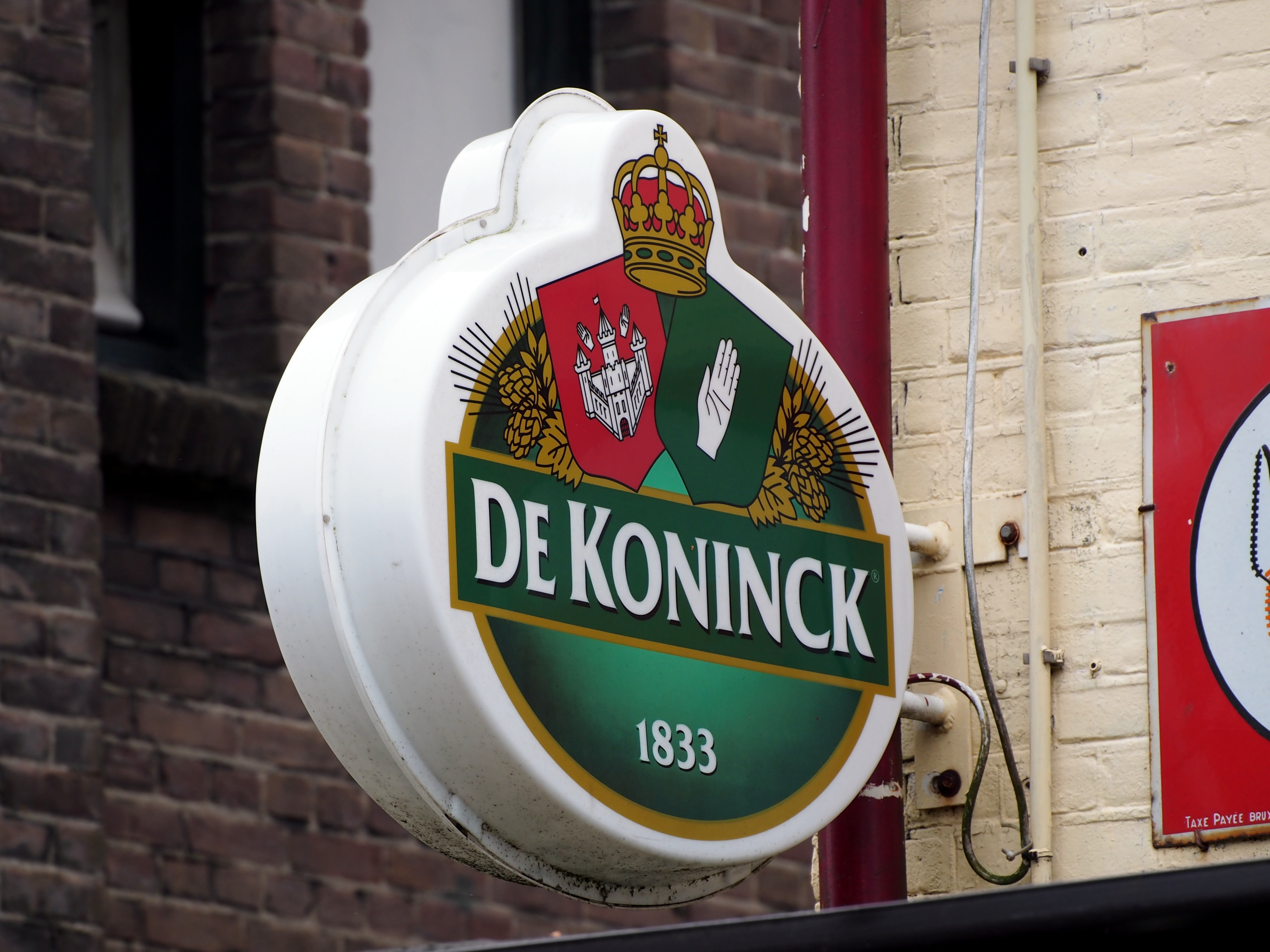

De Koninck

De Koninck Brewery (Brouwerij De Koninck) is a Belgian brewery founded in 1833 and based in Antwerp. The glass in which De Koninck's flagship beer is served is called a bolleke, although this term is most colloquially used to refer to a glass filled with the beer itself and is the way the beer is ordered in bars.

The brewery is known for its flagship beer, De Koninck, which is a pale ale that is brewed using a blend of Belgian malts, hops and yeast. The brewery also produces other beers like "Bolleke", "Blonde" and "Bob". The brewery uses traditional Belgian brewing methods, including open fermentation and aging the beer in oak casks. The brewery is also a popular tourist destination, and offers interactive tours of the brewery and tastings of its beers.

== Beers ==
The brewery currently brews three beers:

- De Koninck, 5% ABV
- De Koninck Triple d'Anvers, 8% ABV
- De Koninck Wild Jo, 6% ABV

The brewery also currently brews three specials:

- Toasting to Wintertime, 6.8% ABV
- Let the Sun Shine, 6.5 ABV
- Bolleke Hop, 5.6 ABV

In the past the brewery has brewed several beers, for which the production has now been discontinued:

- Cuvee Antwerpen '93, introduced in 1993 when the brewery's home city was cultural capital of Europe, 8% ABV
- Cuvee De Koninck, the commercial prolongation of the Cuvee Antwerpen '93, 8% ABV
- Antoon, a special beer introduced for the Anthony van Dyck year in 1999, 6% ABV
- Begyn, introduced for the Béguinage Festival in Hoogstraten in 1999, 6.5% ABV
- Pagadder, 6.5% ABV
- Zomerkoninck, a seasonal brew with strawberries, introduced in 2007 for the Dutch market exclusively, 6% ABV
- Gusto Golden Blond, 8% ABV
- Gusto Ruby Red, 8% ABV
- De Koninck Blond, 6% ABV

== History ==
At the edge of the city of Antwerp, along the road to Mechelen, there was an inn 'De Plaisante Hof' (The Merry Garden). Despite the name, the inn was situated right across from the notorious gallows field (now King Albert Park) where, in the Middle Ages, murderers and other convicts were hanged. On this boundary between Antwerp and Berchem, in front of De Plaisante Hof, stood a stone boundary post showing an upright hand, which was token for merchants entering the town to pay toll. This 'toll hand' now shows on the green right-side escutcheon of the De Koninck Brewery. These days, it can be seen in the brewery itself. The hand is also recognized as the symbol of the city of Antwerp, whose name is (according to some) derived from the Dutch for 'hand'.

On June 26, 1827, Joseph Henricus De Koninck, then husband to Elisabeth Cop, bought De Plaisante Hof. However, he died soon afterwards and his widow remarried Johannes Vervliet who bought back the goods from the inheritance in 1833. At that time Belgium was barely three years old (created in 1830). He turned the inn into a brewery which he named 'De Hand' (The Hand), after the aforementioned toll sign.

By the time Johannes Vervliet died in 1845, the brewery's name was successful and its beer had become wellknown.

The name De Koninck appeared for the first time with Vervliet's stepson, Carolus De Koninck, who continued the business. When he died in 1883, he was succeeded by his son François Joseph, and later by his daughter Josephina Joanna, as head of the family business. Sales were consistently good and the barley-based beer had become the most popular drink in the city of Antwerp.

In 1912, the family business at the corner of the Mechelsesteenweg and the Boomgaardstraat was changed into a Limited Liability Company, Brewery Charles De Koninck, with Josephina De Koninck as the main shareholder. Florent Van Bauwel was appointed executive. According to the brewery's records, Van Bauwel applied himself so well, especially during the First World War, that Miss De Koninck favored him to take over the company. In 1919, Van Bauwel entered into a partnership with the Van den Bogaerts of Willebroek. Later, Florent Van Bauwel and Joseph Van den Bogaert were succeeded by their sons Joseph Van Bauwel and Modeste Van den Bogaert. Dominique and Bernard Van den Bogaert, sons of Modeste, continued leading the brewery after his death. In 2010, the brewery was sold to the Duvel Moortgat Brewery but still operates as an autonomous brand within the group.
