= Diamond Knot Brewing Company =

- Industry: Alcoholic beverage
- Founded: October 1994
- Headquarters: Mukilteo, Washington United States
- Products: Beer
- Owner: Bob Maphet Andy Eason Pat Ringe
- Website: http://www.diamondknot.com/

Diamond Knot Brewing Company is a brewery and operator of alehouses in Mukilteo, Washington, USA.

== History ==
Diamond Knot Craft Brewing was established in October 1994 by two Boeing employees. The two handled all production and distribution in the evenings over the first four years out of subleased space in an alehouse. In March 1999, the alehouse was acquired. It was improved to increase capacity to about 1,200 barrels a year. The brewery was not able to meet demand. Capacity was quadrupled in 2005 with the opening of a 4,300-square-foot (400 m^{2}) facility.

== Beers ==
According to The Seattle Times, the brewery is "widely regarded as producing some of the best, most innovative beers in the region". The India Pale Ale is the brewery's flagship beer. Diamond Knot has also produced a stronger "Industrial XIPA". The Brown Ale is another popular selection.

== Locations ==
Diamond Knot is the first microbrewery in Mukilteo and the oldest in Snohomish County. The original alehouse features stone grill cooking. In addition to the Brewery & Alehouse on the Mukilteo waterfront, the company operates the Brewpub @ MLT in Mountlake Terrace, WA and also the Production Brewery & Taproom in at the company's headquarters.

== Personnel ==
The brewery was established by Bob Maphet and Brian Sollenberger. The two met at a beer club organized by Boeing employees in Everett, Washington. They kept their day jobs and annual production originally was limited to about 600 barrels. In November 2009, Sollenberger died at home due to an accident in the wee hours of the night Sollenberger was a Boeing Engineering Manager for the 787 Dreamliner. Another aerospace engineer, Andrew Ong, co-founded 2Brothers Brewery near Melbourne, Australia, after receiving hands-on experience at Diamond Knot. Bob Maphet died on November 10, 2021, after a prolonged illness and complications from surgery.

== See also ==
- Beer in the United States
