= SingleCut Beersmiths =

American brewery

- Type: Brewery
- Location: 19-33 37th St, Astoria, New York, USA
- Opened: 2012
- Key people: Rich Buceta (founder and CEO)

SingleCut Beersmiths is an American brewery founded in 2012 in Astoria, Queens, New York. The name comes from the luthier term when a guitar is made with only a lower cutaway.

== History ==
SingleCut Beersmiths was founded in 2012 by Rich Buceta, who sold his collection of vintage guitars to finance the brewery. It was the first production brewery in Queens since Prohibition. The brand rapidly expanded and by 2017 the Queens location was brewing at maximum capacity of 11,000 barrels a year. In 2018, SingleCut agreed to purchase a 30,000 barrel facility in Clifton Park, NY facility from Shmaltz Brewing Company for an undisclosed amount.

== See also ==
- Beer in the United States
