= Amarillo hops =

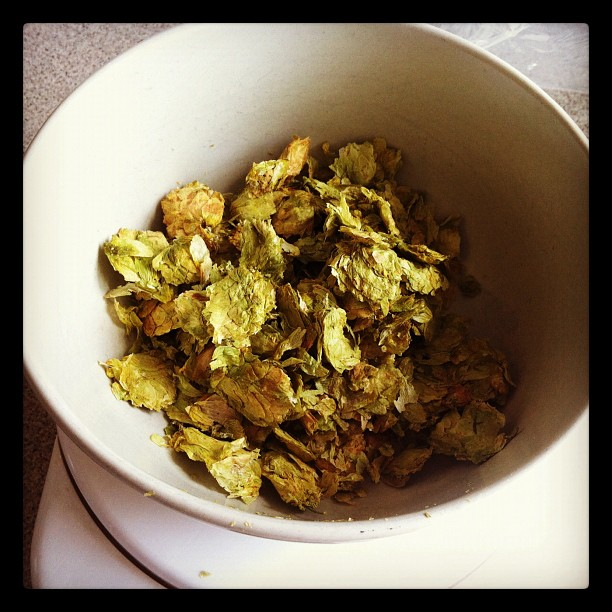
Amarillo hops

Amarillo is a popular brand name of the VGXP01 hops owned by Virgil Gamache Farms Inc. The VGXP01 c.v., was discovered by Virgil Gamache Farms Inc. in one of their hop yards in Washington state and propagated and introduced by them as Amarillo brand. Unlike most varieties of hops, which may be acquired and propagated by the purchase of rhizomes, Amarillo brand hops are privately grown or sourced by Virgil Gamache Farms; also the organization holds a trademark on the name "Amarillo" for hops. There is a biological patent on the plant.

== Characteristics ==
=== Beer ===
- The resultant aroma is of medium strength and very distinct.
- The aroma is described as flowery, spicy and citrus-like with a distinct orange bouquet.
- The hop is good for flavor and aroma
- It can also be used for bittering effectively because of the low cohumulone content

== Acid and oil breakdown ==
Property	VGXP01 Variety
Yield (Kg/Ha)	1350–1800
Alpha acids (%)	8 – 11.0
Beta acids (%)	6 – 7.0
Alpha/Beta Ratio	1.6
Cohumulone (% of alpha acids):	21 – 24
Total Oils (Mls. per 100 grams dried hops)	1.5 - 1.9
Myrcene (as % of total oils)	68 – 70
Caryophyllene (as % of total oils)	2 - 4
Humulene (as % of total oils)	9 - 11
Farnesene (as % of total oils)	2 - 4
Possible Substitutes	Centennial, Cascade
