= Brewery Ommegang =

Brewery near Cooperstown, New York

Coordinates: 42°37′37″N 74°56′43″W

- Location: County Route 33, Cooperstown, New York, United States
- Opened: 1997
- Annual production volume: 35,000 US beer barrels (41,000 hL)
- Owner: Duvel Moortgat Brewery
- Website: www.ommegang.com

Brewery Ommegang is a brewery located near Cooperstown, New York, United States, that specializes in Belgian-style ales.

== History ==
Ommegang began brewing Belgian-style ales in 1997. It was founded by Don Feinberg and Wendy Littlefield, owners of beer import company Vanberg & DeWulf and three Belgian breweries including Duvel Moortgat. Ommegang started up in a purpose-built building based on a traditional Belgian farmhouse, set on a former 136-acre (0.55-square-kilometer) hop farm in the Susqehanna River Valley, four miles (6 kilometers) south of Cooperstown, New York, on County Route 33 in the town of Milford.

Since its opening, Ommegang has grown rapidly; in early 2005, its owner said they have been unable to meet demand for their ales and as a result would add 40 percent to their production capacity over the next year.

By 2003, the Belgian breweries had all been absorbed into large corporations. Feinberg and Littlefield sold their share of Ommegang in 2003 to Belgian brewer Duvel Moortgat Brewery, brewers of the Duvel Golden Ale. Duvel Moortgat brewed limited amounts of beer for Brewery Ommegang in 2006 to help meet demand but has not brewed any since then.

Brewery Ommegang distributes its beers in 46 states and the District of Columbia, including Alaska and Hawaii but excluding Montana, North Dakota, Wyoming, and Mississippi. Ommegang has also begun exporting to Canada, the US Virgin Islands, and Mexico. As of September 2018, Ommegang has begun exporting to France.

Each summer, the brewery hosts a large beer-tasting event, known as Belgium Comes to Cooperstown. The event, which occurs on a Saturday in July or August, includes seven hours of unlimited sampling of over 200 Belgian and Belgian-style beers followed by food, live music, and a bonfire.

On 7 October 2007, Brewery Ommegang hosted the inaugural "CX @ Ommegang", a cyclocross race organized by Team SCARR, a cycling team with Brewery Ommegang as their title sponsor. Cyclocross is popular in Belgium and a cyclocross race on the grounds of a Belgian-style brewery was a natural fit. Over 150 racers from New York State registered for the event. The course included a hairpin turn inside the main event tent.

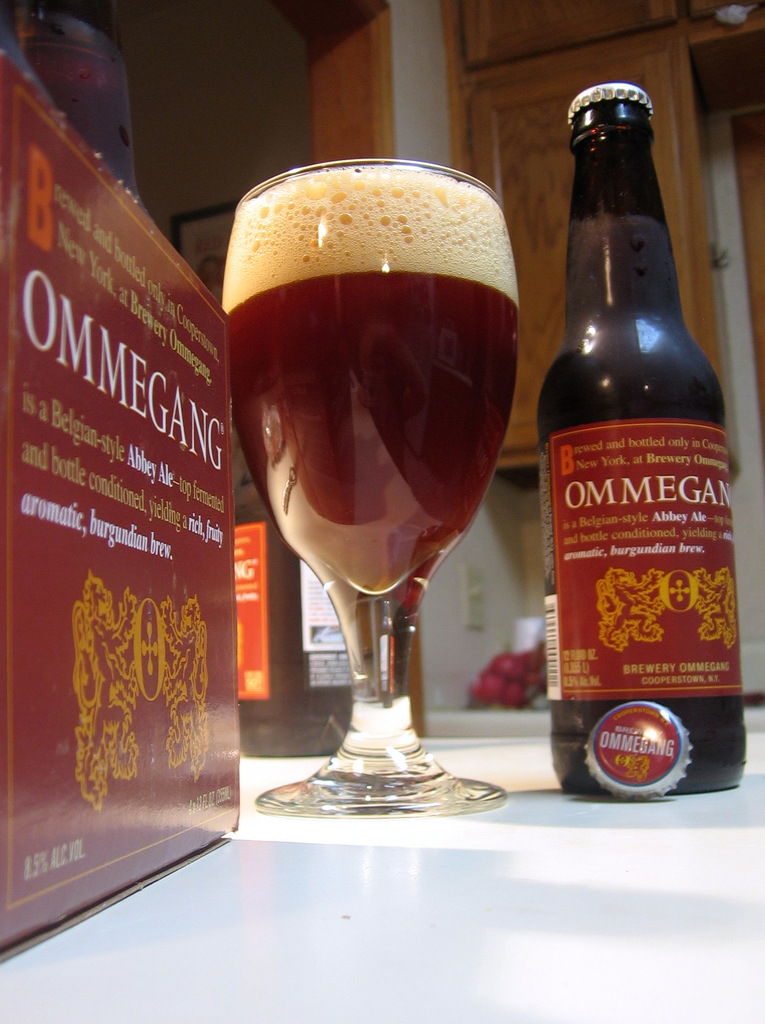
Ommegang Abbey Ale

== Ales ==
=== Active ===
Ommegang brews six ales full-time:

- Ommegang Abbey Ale (a classic Belgian-style abbey double)
- Hennepin Farmhouse Saison (a Saison or seasonal Belgian-style rustic golden ale)(The first Saison in America)
- Rare Vos Amber Ale (a cafe-style amber ale)
- Ommegang Witte Ale (a Belgian-style wheat ale)
- Three Philosophers (a Belgian-style quadrupel with authentic Belgian kriek blended in)
- Neon Rainbows (a New England style india pale ale)

Ommegang Abbey Ale and Three Philosophers can be aged for flavoring. Ommegang recommends ageing Hennepin up to 3 years, and Abbey and Three Philosophers up to 5 years.

=== Special Releases ===
Ommegang brews several one-off beers with a few repeat visits.

2007:

- Ommegeddon Funkhouse Ale (a golden ale with Brettanomyces bruxellensis and dry-hopping, brewed in July
- Ommegang Chocolate Indulgence Stout
- Ommegang Biere de Mars (an amber ale, bottle-conditioned with Brettanomyces bruxellensis)

2008:

- Ommegeddon Funkhouse Ale (a golden ale with Brettanomyces bruxellensis and dry-hopping, brewed in July
- Ommegang Chocolate Indulgence Stout
- Ommegang Biere de Mars (an amber ale, bottle-conditioned with Brettanomyces bruxellensis)
- Ommegang Rouge (Flemish red ale, collaboration with Brouwerij Bockor, 5.5%)

2009:

- Ommegang Adoration Strong Winter Ale: 10% ABV, spiced, dark and malty.
- Ommegang Chocolate Indulgence Stout
- Ommegang Biere de Mars (an amber ale, bottle-conditioned with Brettanomyces bruxellensis)
- Ommegang Ale 2009 (Belgian-style stout blended with kriek, 6.2)

2010:

- Ommegang Chocolate Indulgence Stout
- Ommegang BPA (since elevated to year-round sales)
- Ommegang Zuur (a Flanders Brown Ale, brewed in collaboration with Liefmans of Belgium)
- Ommegang Tripel Perfection (a Belgian-style tripel, but with spices)
- Ommegang Cup O' Kyndnes (a Belgian-Scotch ale, brewed with smoked malt and heather flowers)
- Ommegang Adoration Strong Winter Ale

2011:

- Ommegang Chocolate Indulgence (Belgian-Style Stout, 7% ABV)
- Ommegang Gnomegang (Belgian-style Strong Blonde Ale, 9.4% ABV) - Fermented with Chouffe yeast in primary fermentation.
- Ommegang Aphrodite Tart beer (Belgian-style ale)
- Ommegang Belgian Independence Day Saison (Belgian-style saison 7.0%)

2012:

- Ommegang Seduction (Belgian-style stout blended with Kriek, 6.8%)
- Ommegang Biere d' Hougoumont (Biere de Garde aged on White Oak and Maple wooden staves, 7.3%)
- Ommegang Belgian Independence Day Tripel (8.3%)
- Ommegang Scythe & Sickle (Harvest ale, 5.8%. Now a seasonal offering)
- Ommegang Gnomegang (Belgian-style Strong Blonde Ale, 9.4% ABV) - Fermented with Chouffe yeast in primary fermentation.
- Ommegang Duvel Rustica (Belgian-style Golden ale collaboration with Duvel Moortgat, 8.5%)
- Ommegang XV (Belgian-style Trappist ale brewed to celebrate Ommegang's Fifteenth anniversary. 9.6%)

2013:

- Ommegang Art of Darkness (a Belgian-style dark ale, 8.9% ABV)
- Ommegang Fleur de Houblon (Summer Ale, 6.8% ABV)
- Game of Thrones: Iron Throne (6.5%, March 2013)
- Ommegang Gnomegang (Belgian-style Strong Blonde Ale, 9.4% ABV) - Fermented with Chouffe yeast in primary fermentation.
- Ommegang Belgian Independence Day Double White (Belgian-style Double White brewed with spices, 6.6%)
- Ommegang Scythe & Sickle (Harvest Ale, 5.8% ABV)
- Game of Thrones: Take the Black Stout (7%, October 2013)
- Ommegang Wild at Heart (an American Wild ale with 100% Brettanomyces used in primary fermentation. Nov 2013.)
- Ommegang Adoration (Belgian-style Strong Winter Ale, 10% ABV)

=== Brewer's Obsession Series ===
- Ommegang Art of Darkness (a Belgian-style dark ale, 8.9% ABV)
- Ommegang Wild at Heart (an American Wild ale with 100% Brettanomyces used in primary fermentation. Nov 2013.)

=== Game of Thrones Series ===
In 2013, Ommegang made available the first in a series of brews based on the HBO TV series Game of Thrones:

- Iron Throne Blonde Ale (6.5%, March 2013)
- Take The Black Stout (7%, October 2013)
- Fire and Blood Red Ale (6.8%, March 2014)
- Valar Morghulis Dubbel Ale (8%, October 2014)
- Three-Eyed Raven Dark Saison Ale (7.2%, April 2015)
- Seven Kingdoms Hoppy Wheat Ale (6.9%, March 2016)
- Valar Dohaeris Belgian-Style Tripel Ale (9%, September 2016)
- Bend The Knee Belgian Golden Ale (9%, May 2017)
- Winter Is Here Double White Ale (8.3%, Fall 2017)
- Hand of the Queen Barleywine (10.7%, April 2018)
- Queen of the Seven Kingdoms Sour and Blonde Ale Blend (6.5%, June 2018)
- Mother of Dragons Smoked Porter and Kriek Ale Blend (6.6%, September 2018)
- King in the North Barrel-Aged Imperial Stout (10.5% November 2018)
- For The Throne Strong Golden Ale co-fermented with Pinot Grigio and Viognier grapes (9.5%, March 2019)
- My Watch Has Ended Imperial Brown Ale, with maple syrup and fenugreek (8%, October 2019)

=== Seasonal ===
Ommegang currently brews 4 seasonals:

- Ommegang Glimmerglass (named after Glimmerglass State Park which is also located in Cooperstown) (Saison, 5.4% ABV)
- Ommegang Fleur de Houblon (Summer Ale, 6.8% ABV)
- Ommegang Scythe & Sickle (Harvest Ale, 5.8% ABV)
- Ommegang Adoration (Belgian-style Strong Winter Ale, 10% ABV)
- Ommegang Cooperstown Ale (named because of the history Ommegang shares with Cooperstown NY, Baseball Beer) (Blonde Ale, 5.5% ABV)

== Partnerships ==
Each winter, Ommegang Brewery partners with the Inn at Cooperstown for a Bed and Brew weekend package for the "ultimate beer enthusiast." It includes two nights at the Inn and a multi-course food pairing dinner at the brewery.

== Awards ==
Witte

- 2008 World Beer Cup: Silver Medal, Belgian-style Witbier
- 2010 World Beer Cup: Silver Medal, Belgian-style Wibier
- 2011 Great American Beer Fest: Gold Medal, Belgian-style Witbier
- 2011 European Beer Star: Silver Medal, Belgian-style Witbier
- 2014 Great American Beer Fest: Silver Medal, Belgian-style Witbier

BPA

- 2010 European Beer Star: Bronze Medal, Belgian-style Ale

Rare Vos

- 2008 Great American Beer Fest: Bronze Medal, Belgian Ale
- 2012 World Beer Cup: Gold Medal, Belgian-style Blonde Ale or Pale Ale
- 2012 European Beer Star: Bronze Medal, Spiced beer

Hennepin

- Cave-aged Hennepin winning the 2004 Great American Beer Festival Gold Medal for French- and Belgian-style Saisons
- 2006 World Beer Cup Silver Medal for French- Belgian-Style Saison
- 2007 European Beer Star: Gold Medal, Spiced beer

Abbey

- 2010 World Beer Cup: Gold Medal, Belgian Dubbel Ale
- 2012 European Beer Star: Silver Medal, Belgian-style Dubbel

Three Philosophers

- 2006 World Beer Cup Bronze Medal Belgian-Style Dark Strong Ale
- 2011 European Beer Star: Silver Medal, Belgian-style Strong Ale
- 2013 Great American Beer Festival: Bronze Medal, Belgian Style Quadruple Ale

Gnomegang

- 2012 European Beer Star: Gold Medal, Belgian-style Tripel

XV

- 2012 European Beer Star: Silver Medal, Belgian-style Strong Ale

== See also ==
- Beer in the United States
- Barrel-aged beer
