= War Horse Brewing Company =

American brewery company

Coordinates: 42°49′23″N 76°55′25″W

- Industry: Alcoholic Beverage
- Founded: May 2008
- Headquarters: Geneva, New York
- Products: Beer Cider Soda
- Brands: War Horse Brewing Company beers, Red Apple Bombshell Hard Ciders
- Owner: Dave Mansfield

War Horse Brewing Company (formerly Barley Yards Brewing Company), part of the Three Brothers Wineries & Estates, is a brewery operated by Dave Mansfield in Geneva, New York, USA. The brewery opened on May 24, 2008 and is the first brewery in the United States to brew a Riesling ale, made by blending the wort of an American-style wheat beer with ten percent juice from Riesling grapes.

== The Brewery ==
War Horse Brewing Company is brewed on-site as of May 17, 2016. The beers are brewed on a 15bbl system. War Horse brews year-round beers in three varieties – The Riesling Ale, a Scotch Ale, and an East-Coast style India Pale Ale. The Riesling Ale is made by adding estate-grown Riesling juice to their American Wheat Ale. They also have a rotating list of seasonals and one-offs.

War Horse also produces a line of Hard Ciders called "Red Apple Bombshell" as well as root beer, orange cream, ginger beer, and other non-alcoholic sodas. The Red Apple Bombshell line of ciders is made using New York State apples and is available on tap and in cans at War Horse Brewing Company. From 2008 to 2016, War Horse contract-brewed their beers at Custom Brewcrafters, an offsite brewpub in Honeoye Falls.

In Summer 2016, War Horse will be partnering up with the National Women's Hall of Fame in Seneca Falls, NY to brew a beer called "Inspiring Ale". A Belgian Wit brewed with coriander, orange peel, and rose hips, a portion of the proceeds from every pint, growler, and can sold will go directly to the Women's Hall of Fame.

== The tasting room ==
The War Horse Brewing Company tasting room was renovated and rebuilt in 2016. It is located at Three Brothers Wineries & Estates and is connected to the brewing facility. The tasting room is themed on a British town during World War II. War Horse Brewing Company draws its inspiration from owner Luanne's father, Mike, who served in the Navy during World War II. Tastings, half pints, pints, and flights are available in the tasting room with plenty of seating outside. Beer, cider, and sodas are available for purchase in growlers, half growlers, and 16oz cans. The brewery is open every day.

== See also ==
- Beer in the United States
