= Duvel Moortgat Brewery =

Flemish family-controlled brewery founded in 1871 in Belgium

Coordinates: 51°02′31″N 4°19′43″E

Brouwerij Duvel Moortgat
- Type: Private
- Industry: Brewing
- Founded: 1871
- Headquarters: Breendonk, Belgium
- Products: Beer
- Production output: 1,400,000 hl (2015)
- Website: www.duvelmoortgat.be

Duvel Moortgat Brewery (Brouwerij Duvel Moortgat) is a Flemish family-controlled brewery founded in 1871 in Antwerp Province, Belgium. Its strong golden pale ale, Duvel, is exported to more than forty countries. Duvel is Brabantian, Ghent and Antwerp dialect for devil, the standard Dutch word being duivel [ˈdœy̯vəl]. Other popular beers include Maredsous and Vedett.

== History ==
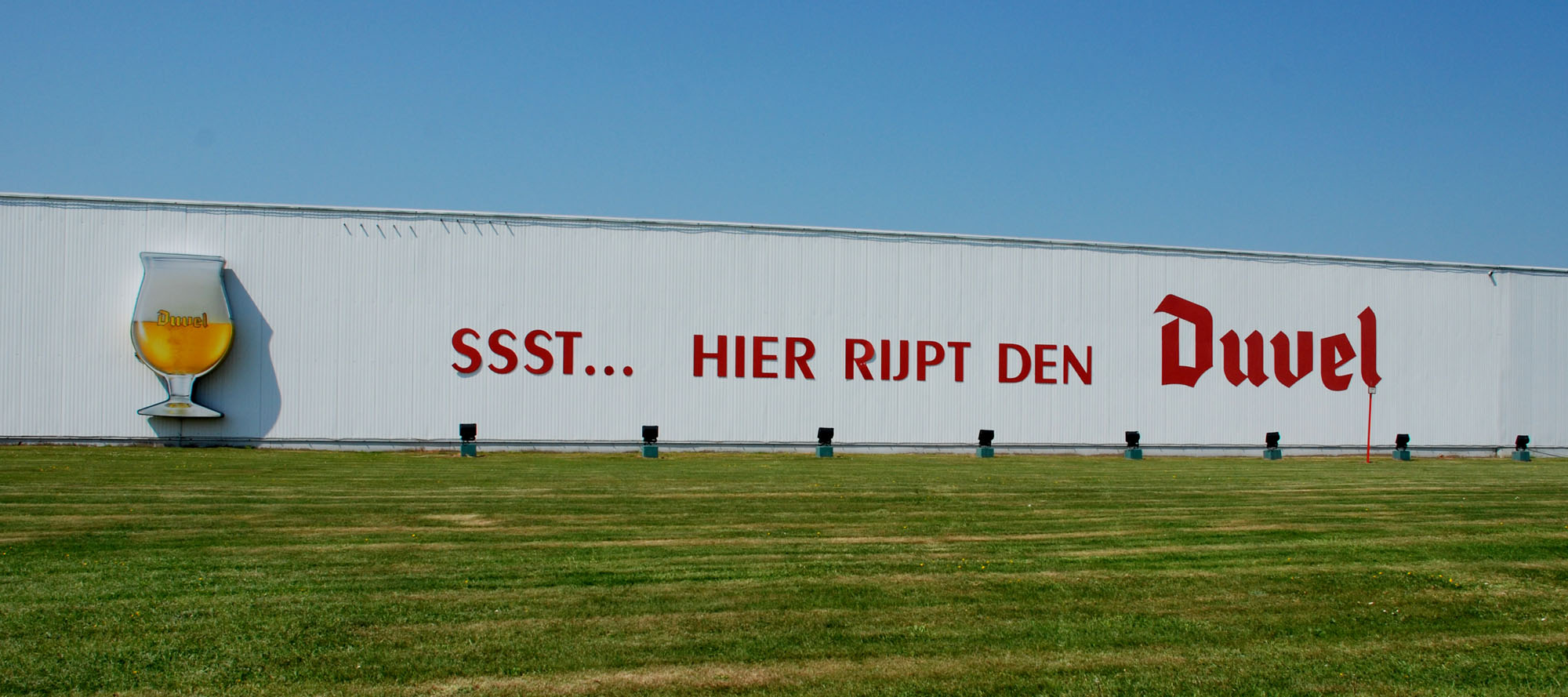
"Shhh... the Duvel is ripening here"

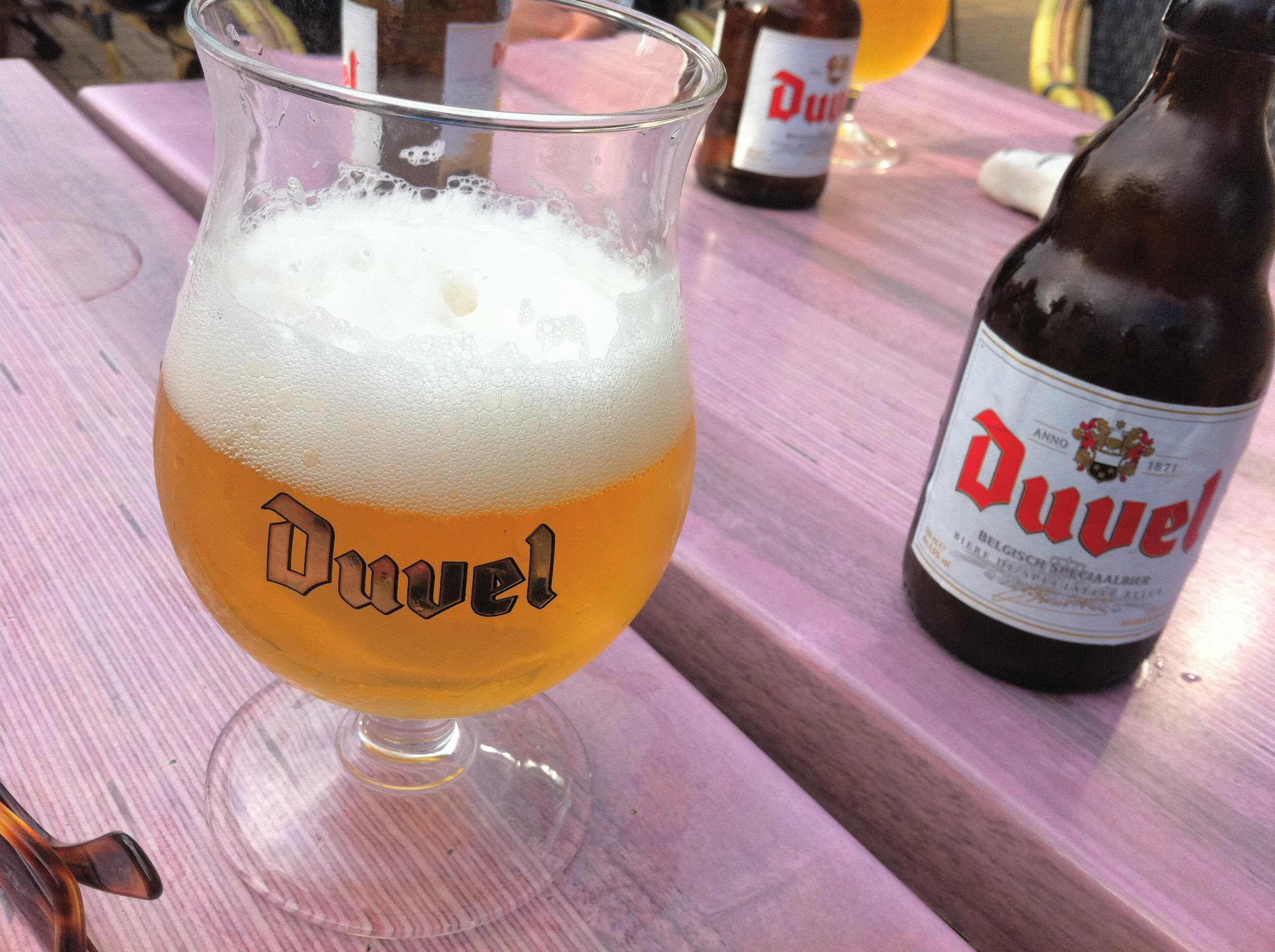
Duvel beer served in a cafe

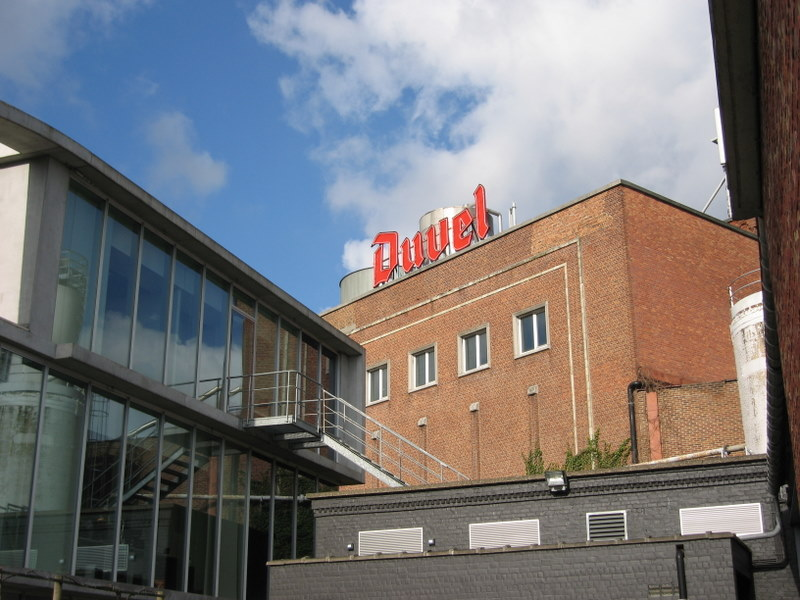
Duvel Moortgat Brewery

The brewery Moortgat was founded in 1871 by Jan-Leonard Moortgat, who was descended from a family of brewers that lived in Steenhuffel, Belgium. In the 1950s, the third generation of Moortgats took control of the brewery.

In the early 1970s, when the company was struggling financially, Moortgat bottled and distributed the Danish beer, Tuborg. The two companies ended this arrangement in the early 1980s, but it did save the brewery, which by then had managed to also set up massive distribution channels for their flagship beer, Duvel. In June 1999, Duvel Moortgat NV went public on Euronext Brussels.

Duvel Moortgat was an original investor in the Belgian-influenced Brewery Ommegang craft brewery founded in Cooperstown, New York, United States, in 1997. Ommegang was set up by Wendy Littlefield and Don Feinberg, who had imported Duvel products since 1982. In 2003 the Belgian company took complete control of the brewery and set up Duvel USA to handle both Ommegang and Duvel Moortgat brands and others.

In 2001, Duvel acquired 50% of the Czech brewery Bernard.

In 2006, Duvel Moortgat bought fellow Belgian brewery Brasserie d'Achouffe.

In June 2008 they bought Liefmans Brewery of Oudenaarde in Belgium, who are best known for their fruit beers.

In 2010, Duvel Moortgat acquired 100 percent of the shares of the De Koninck Brewery of Antwerp.

In 2014, Duvel Moortgat acquired Boulevard Brewing Company, which is located in Kansas City, Missouri. In July 2015, it was announced that Duvel Moortgat would acquire Paso Robles, California craft brewer Firestone Walker Brewing Company.

In September 2015 they bought an undisclosed stake in Brouwerij 't IJ, a Belgian-influenced brewery in Amsterdam.

In 2016 they bought 35% of Birrificio del Ducato based near Parma in Italy, and brought that stake up to 70% in 2018.

== Products ==
=== Duvel ===
Duvel Tripel Hop

To commemorate the end of World War I, the Moortgats named their main beer Victory Ale. In the 1920s, an avid drinker described the beer as "nen echten duvel" (a real devil in Brabantian Dutch) - perhaps in reference to its formidable alcohol content (8.5% ABV) - and the name of the beer was changed to Duvel. It has become the brewery's flagship beer. Considered by many the definitive version of the Belgian Strong Pale Ale style, Duvel is brewed with Pilsner malt and dextrose, and hopped with Saaz hops and Styrian Goldings, the yeast still stems from the original culture of Scottish yeast bought by Albert Moortgat during a business tour of the U.K. just after World War I.

In 2007, a special version of the regular Duvel, which typically uses 2 hop varieties, was released. This limited-edition product added American hops of the Amarillo variety, boosted the alcohol content to 9.5% ABV and is called Duvel Tripel Hop. In 2010, a second limited-edition of Tripel Hop was brewed after a bet with the Duvel Moortgat CEO. If the Facebook group We want Duvel Tripel Hop reached at least 10,000 members, a second edition would be brewed. The group reached 10,000 members within a few months and the CEO stuck to his promise. Between 2010 and 2016, 6 editions of Duvel Tripel Hop were released:

- 2010: Amarillo.
- 2012: Citra.
- 2013: Sorachi Ace.
- 2014: Mosaic.
- 2015: Equinox.
- 2016: HBC 291.

In May 2016, Duvel issued special edition blind tasting packs of the six releases of Duvel Tripel Hop, and opened an online vote for people to choose their favourite edition. In June 2016 it was announced that the most popular edition was the 2012 Duvel Tripel Hop: Citra, and that this would become a permanent addition to the Duvel Moortgat portfolio.

=== Maredsous ===
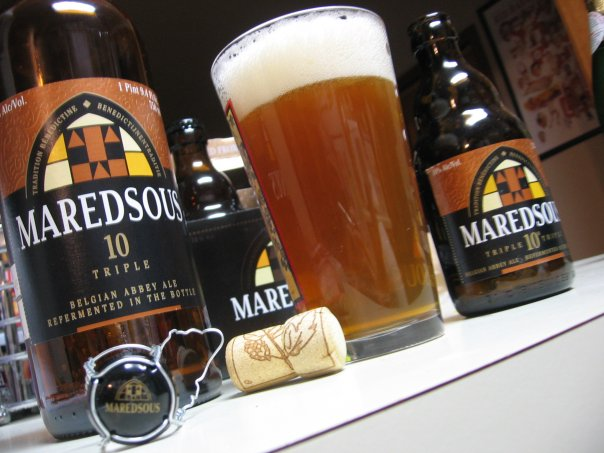
Maredsous 10, a Belgian tripel ale.

In 1963, Moortgat began brewing its Maredsous line of abbey beers, under license of the monks of Maredsous Abbey. There are currently three beers offered under the Maredsous name: Maredsous Blonde (blonde ale, 6% ABV), Maredsous Brune (dubbel, 8% ABV), and Maredsous Triple (trippel, 10% ABV).

=== Other beers ===
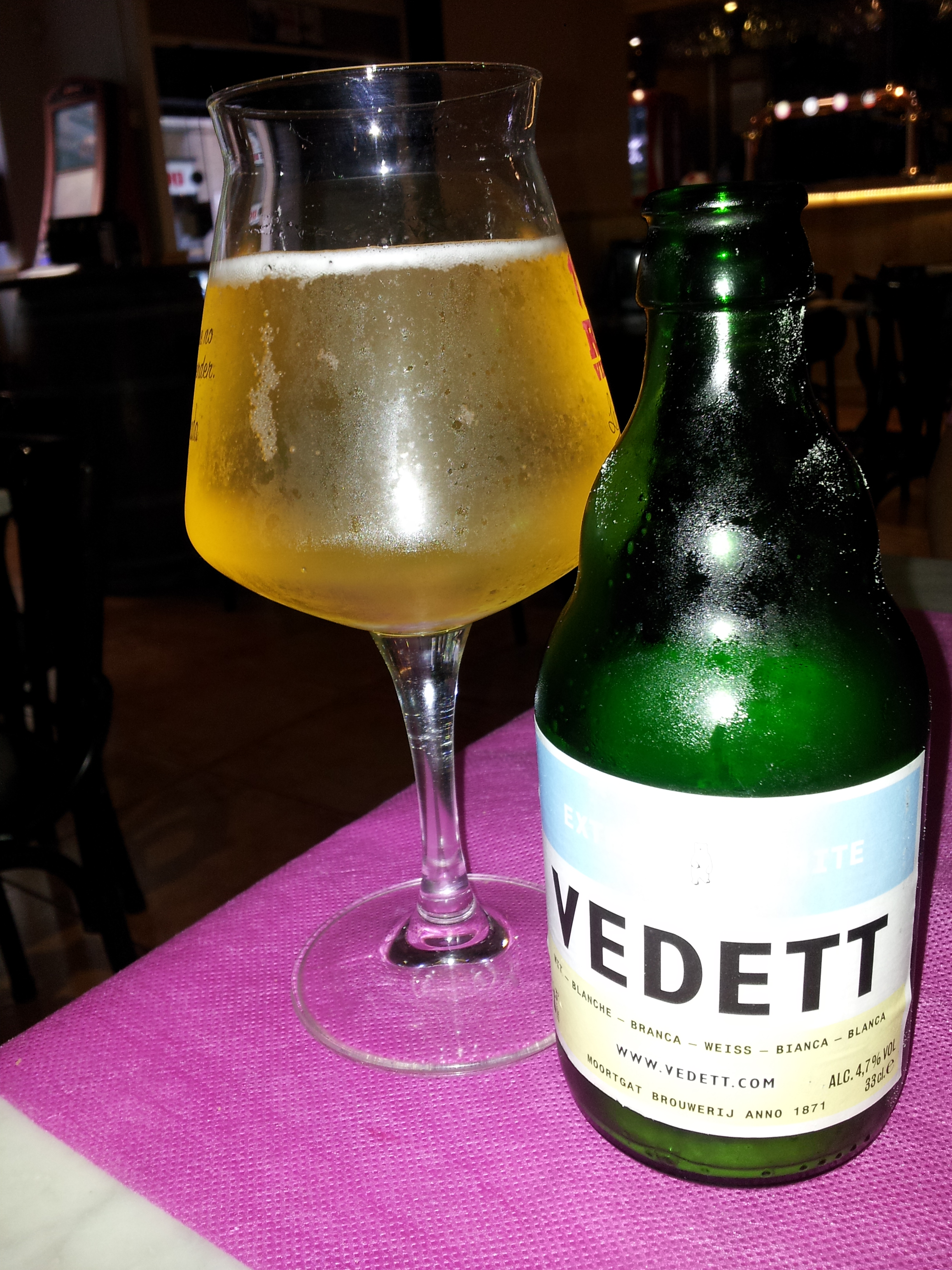
Vedett blanche

In 1930, the brewery launched Bel Pils.

The Vedett, a pilsener, was created in 1945 by Albert Moortgat, Jan's son. Since 2003, Vedett has been relaunched as a trendy luxury lager, aimed at young customers in upscale urban bars. Vedett currently has a marketing campaign that gives customers the chance to have photos of themselves placed on the labels of bottles.

In 1989, a wheat beer was launched in collaboration with Palm Breweries called Steendonk (referring to the villages of Steenhuffel and Breendonk where the brewers are located).

In 2000, a new beer (Passendale) was born as a result of the association between Moortgat and cheese factory Campina (which produces Passendale cheese). This product has since been discontinued.

In 2017, ‘t Ei van de Duvel (The Devil's Egg) a limited edition black rye IPA was introduced, a collaboration between Duvel Moortgat and Brouwerij 't IJ.

In 2018, Duvel Single Fermented Belgian Golden Ale, a 6.8% Belgian Golden Ale that is fermented only once and packaged in 500ml cans, was introduced.

In 2020, 't IJ van de Duvel (The Devil's Egg) a collaboration between Duvel Moortgat and Brouwerij 't IJ was introduced a limited edition hazy IPA.
