= Hilliard's Beer =

Defunct brewery in Seattle, Washington

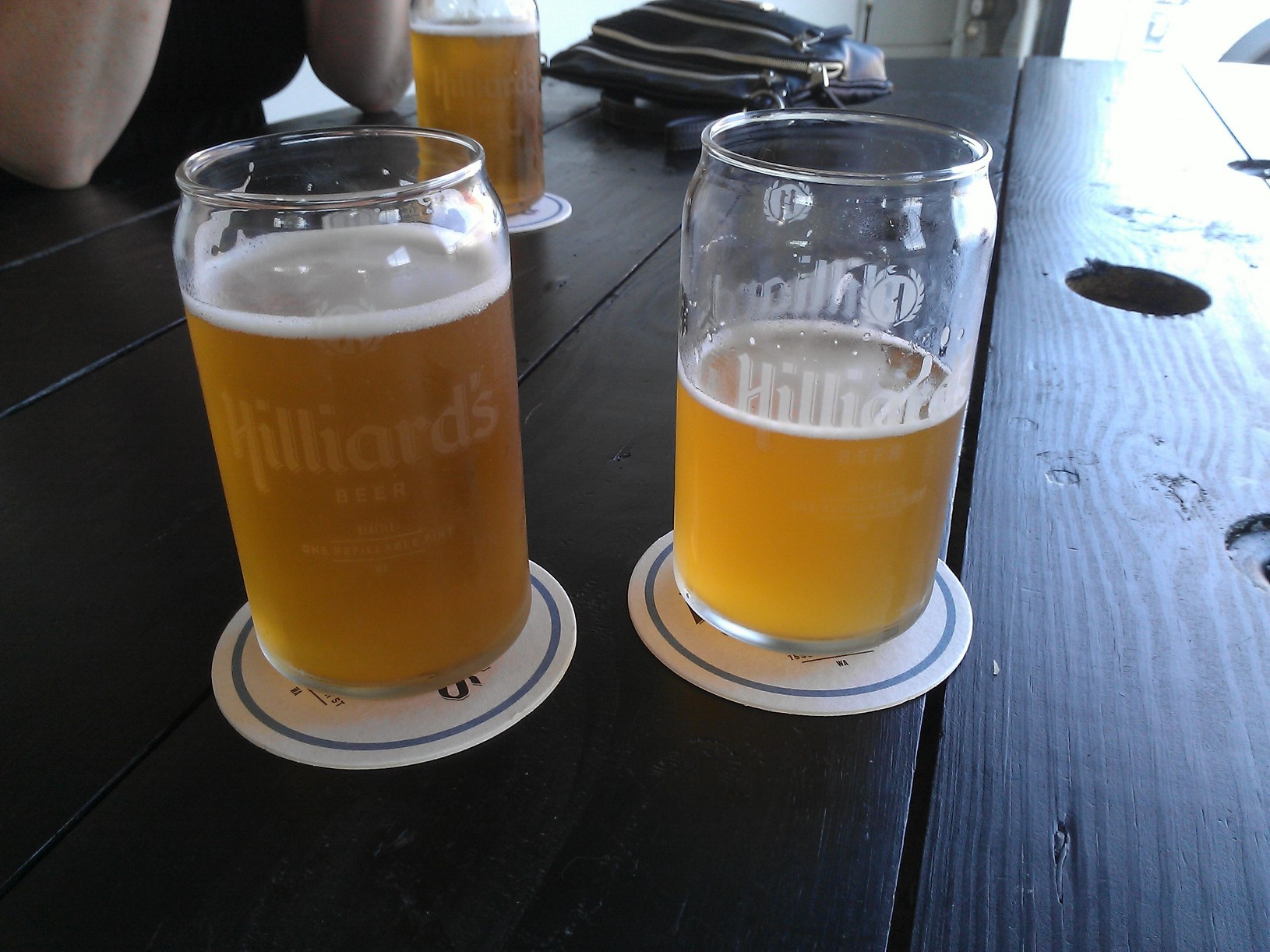
- Location: Seattle, Washington, U.S.
- Opened: October 7, 2011
- Closed: 2016
- Key people: Ryan Hilliard, Adam Merkl
- Website: hilliardsbeer.com

Active beers
Name	Type
Amber Ale	Amber Ale
Saison	Saison
Blonde	Blonde ale
Pils	Pilsner

Hilliard's Beer was a brewery located in Seattle, Washington, United States. The brewery opened on October 7, 2011, in the city's Ballard neighborhood, in a building constructed in 1947. The company is named after its founder Ryan Hilliard, a former flight instructor.

Hilliard's was one of the first craft breweries in Washington which focused on producing beer in aluminum cans.

In June 2016, it was announced that Hilliard's was to be bought by Tukwila-based Odin Brewing Company, and that Hilliard himself was to leave the craft beer industry rather than to merge his company or join the new team. The brewery is now permanently closed.

== History ==
Hilliard's brewed various styles of beer in 16-ounce tall boy cans. It typically served several beers on draft such as Hilliard's Nautical Reference Pale Ale (Pale Ale), Chrome Satan (California Common 'Style' Beer), Murdered Out Stout (Dry Irish Stout) and E.xtra S.pecial B.elgian (a Dark Saison, E.S.B. for short.)

The Hilliard's taproom served people seven days a week. The brewery's overall production in 2012 (its first calendar year) was 1600 barrels; or 384,000 cans. They were able to can beer at a rate of 24 cans per minute.

== Community ==
Hilliard's frequently supported local non-profit groups in the visual arts, theater, youth media, film, and sports fields. Organizations which partnered with Hilliard's Beer included the Northwest Film Forum, Seattle Art Museum, Henry Art Gallery, Tilted Thunder Rail Birds Roller Derby, Seattle Gay and Lesbian Film Festival, Frye Art Museum, and the Uganda Village Project.

Hilliard's Beer was also active in collaborations within the brewing community and was the first small craft brewery to jointly brew a beer with craft beer veteran, Redhook Ale Brewery. Together they manufactured a product in July 2013 called, "Joint Effort", a hemp-infused beer brewed in response to the legalization of marijuana in Washington state. The session ale was brewed with hemp seeds and dry-hopped with Zeus, Cascade and Summit hops.

== See also ==
- Beer in the United States
