= Joseph Fallert Brewery complex =

Brewery complex in Brooklyn, New York

Coordinates: 40°42′27″N 73°56′52″W

The Joseph Fallert Brewery complex is a historic industrial brewery site located on Meserole Street at the corner of Lorimer Street in Williamsburg, Brooklyn, New York City. Built in the late 1800s, the red-brick complex represents one of the surviving remnants of Brooklyn's once-extensive brewing industry.

== History ==
Designed by architect Frederick Wunder, some buildings in the Joseph Fallert Brewery complex possess characteristics of American round arch style architecture. The office building of the Fallert brewery was designed in a Romanesque Revival style. By 1900, the Joseph Fallert Brewery complex produced over 50,000 barrels a year.

=== Proposed demolition ===
In late 2025, Meserole Lorimer Realty LLC paid over $19 million for the three lots that cover the brewery property and filed applications in December to demolish the industrial complex.

== See also ==
- William Ulmer Brewery, another brewery complex in the area
