= Great South Bay Brewery =

Microbrewery on Long Island, New York state

- Location: Bay Shore, New York
- Opened: 2009
- Key people: Rick Sobotka – brewmaster
- Website: greatsouthbaybrewery.com

The Great South Bay Brewery is a microbrewery located in Bay Shore in Suffolk County, Long Island.

Founded in 2009 by brewmaster and anaesthesiologist Rick Sobotka, the brewery is known for its nautical theme (including founding date written out in standard maritime format) and wide range of specialty craft beers. Their beer is available in 12 oz and 16 oz cans, 4-pks, 12-pks, cases and kegs, and the brewery has a 4000sq/ft taproom and bar. Great South Bay won two gold medals at the 2015 Great American Beer Festival.
