= Shmaltz Brewing Company =

Brewery in New York, US

- Industry: Alcoholic beverage
- Founded: 1996
- Founder: Jeremy Cowan
- Headquarters: Troy, New York, United States
- Products: Beer
- Owner: Jeremy Cowan
- Number of employees: 10
- Website: shmaltzbrewing.com

Shmaltz Brewing Company is an American craft brewing company headquartered in Troy, New York. Originally primarily known for its He'Brew flagship brand, the company produces a large line of Shmaltz Brewing beers and numerous other brands including 518/838 craft beers and the Alphabet City Brewing brand. It also produced Coney Island Craft Lagers until that brand's acquisition by Boston Beer Company in 2013.

Shmaltz Brewing now sells across the U.S. East Coast and select other U.S. markets. As of 2021, its year-round line includes Hop Manna IPA, Hop Momma IPA, and numerous ongoing specialty releases. Year-round Alphabet City releases include 7th Street Blonde and Village IPA.

The company marked its 25th anniversary in September 2021 with the announcement of the final season for the Shmaltz brand. Founder Cowan and his staff will continue to focus on Alphabet City Brewing Company, the 518 Craft tasting room in Troy, and further developing their consulting practice helping other craft brewers.

Its brews have won awards including Grand Champion (Giant Beer Category) at the United States Beer Tasting Championship (Jewbelation Reborn), a silver medal (Sour & Barrel Aged Category) at the World Beer Cup (Funky Jewbelation), and a silver medal at the Calgary Beer Fest (Death of a Contract Brewer.

The company's name refers to shmaltz, a type of cooking fat frequently associated with Ashkenazi Jewish cuisine. Its He'Brew and related lines nod to Jewish tradition in a variety of humorous, punning, and tongue-in-cheek ways, beginning with the "Chosen Beer" slogan in humorous opposition to the slogans of the large industrial breweries such as "the King (or the Champagne) of Beers." Cowan has described "the Three Pillars of Shmaltz" as "Quality, Commitment, Shtick."

== Early history: West Coast founding and He'Brew beer ==
Founder and owner Jeremy Cowan established Shmaltz Brewing in San Francisco in 1996. The initial He'Brew Beer began as a Hanukkah experiment when Cowan and friends squeezed pomegranates to produce juice for a brew inspired by ingredients mentioned in the Old Testament. Early on, Cowan distributed his first beer himself out of the trunk of his grandmother's Volvo in the San Francisco Bay area.

In 1997, Anderson Valley Brewing Company began brewing He'Brew, and the brand's distribution expanded to small craft beer wholesalers in California, Chicago, and New York.

== 2003–2007: East Coast production, National expansion ==
In 2003, Shmaltz moved production to Mendocino Brewing Company's facility in Saratoga Springs, New York. During this period they began packaging Genesis Ale and Messiah Nut Brown Ale in six-packs. Genesis 10:10 was their 10th-anniversary brew, fermented with pomegranate juice resembling Cowan's original brew.

In 2004, Shmaltz launched the limited seasonal Jewbelation line. Each yearly edition uses the same number of malts, hops, and alcohol-by-volume value as the number of years the company has been brewing.

In 2006, Shmaltz Brewing marked its 10th anniversary with the release of its Origin Pomegranate Strong Ale along with its Genesis 10:10 beer, whose multiple-malt formula also includes pomegranates (pomegranates symbolizing righteousness in the Jewish tradition). In the same year, the company debuted Bittersweet Lenny's R.I.P.A., a rye double IPA dedicated to Lenny Bruce, as the first in a series of "Tributes to Jewish Stars." It won a silver medal at the Great American Beer Festival.

In 2007, Shmaltz released a new line of craft-brewed lagers under the Coney Island Craft Lagers banner in collaboration with the arts nonprofit Coney Island USA, which works toward the cultural and economic revitalization of the Coney Island neighborhood of Brooklyn in New York City. A portion of the proceeds went to the organization.

== 2008–2012: Brooklyn, Coney Island Craft Lager, Founder's Memoir ==
Shmaltz operated the Coney Island Brewing Company's brewery, the smallest commercial brewery by volume in the world, at Coney Island seasonally.

In 2010, the Coney Island brand was awarded "Best Craft Brewer" and "Best in Show" at Beverage World Magazine's BevStar Awards for product quality, brand marketing, and overall creativity in "pushing the limits of lager". The brewery's 2011 ribbon cutting was attended by Brooklyn Borough President Marty Markowitz and Brooklyn Chamber of Commerce President Carl Hum. Shmaltz also received a "Distinguished Business Award" from the Brooklyn Chamber of Commerce.

In 2010, Malt Shop Publishing released Cowan's memoir, Craft Beer Bar Mitzvah, recounting his Northern California upbringing and chronicling the evolution of He'Brew Beer from a joke among friends to a nationally distributed craft beer brand. In addition to a book tour, Cowan made many other appearances during this period, including as a panelist and keynote speaker at the Craft Brewers Conference and presentations at the Great American Beer Festival.

In 2011, Shmaltz began an annual partnership with Terrapin Beer Company on their annual Reunion Ale to raise funds and awareness on behalf of the Institute for Myeloma and Bone Cancer Research (IMBCR).

Hop Manna IPA, the first IPA in the He'Brew line, won the gold medal at the 2012 World Beer Championships.

During this period Shmaltz Brewing launched the limited seasonal release Rejewvenator. Rejewvenator is a half-doppelbock, half-Belgian-style Dubbel that was awarded gold medals at the Beverage Testing Institute's 2010 and 2011 World Beer Championships. Each year the recipe includes a different sacred fruit added to the fermenting wort (e.g. fig juice in 2008, date juice in 2009, and Concord grapes in 2010.

== 2013–2018: Upstate New York ==
In 2013, Shmaltz Brewing sold the Coney Island line to Boston Beer Company, generating the funds that enabled Shmaltz to open its own New York State production brewery in Clifton Park, New York after 17 years of contract brewing. The brewery opened in May 2013, marked in the company's typical humorous style by the release of Death of a Contract Brewer Black IPA. The facility included a 50-barrel brewhouse capable of producing 30,000 US beer barrels (35,000 hL) per year. The brewery packaged 12- and 22-ounce bottles and kegs, and later cans, and offered on-site tours and tastings.

In 2013, Shmaltz began a partnership with Cathedral Square Brewery denoted the "Immaculate Collaboration". They released their first St. Lenny's brew that year and continued the partnership in subsequent years.

In November 2014, the company released its first Hanukkah beer: Hanukkah, Chanukuh: Pass the Beer. 2015 releases included the debut of the Slingshot series as well as Wishbone, a double IPA; Bock Bock, a barrel-aged imperial bock; and, in line with the company's shtick, Circum Session Ale, an ale that began as an April Fool's joke before becoming a real brew.

In 2015, Shmaltz and Cathedral Square again collaborated to launch Saint Jewbelation Belgian Style Imperial Sour Rye.

That year, Shmaltz brewed the first "She'Brew" beer in collaboration with the 2nd Annual International Women's Collaboration Brew Day. The brewing effort was coordinated by the Pink Boots Society to empower female brewers and help women further their careers in the craft beer industry through scholarships and educational programs. Proceeds from beer sales are donated to the Pink Boots Society and the charity Girls Inc. of the Greater Capital Region (Albany, NY). The partnership has continued annually. Also beginning in 2015, Shmaltz began offering Slingshot, an American craft lager.

Over the 2015–2016 holiday season Shmaltz released a variety pack called "Shtick in a Box" to mark the company's 20th anniversary.

In 2016, Shmaltz teamed with the arcade-game-focused bar chain Barcade to release a pastrami-inspired beer, Pastrami Pils, originally a draft-only brew exclusive to Barcade, then released in 2018 in bottles.

In 2017, under an exclusive licensing agreement with CBS, Shmaltz Brewing began releasing a series of Star Trek beers distributed throughout Shmaltz's sales network, beginning with Star Trek 50: The Trouble With Tribbles and continuing with releases including Star Trek Golden Anniversary Ale: Voyage To The Northeast Quadrant, Captain's Holiday, Deep Space Nine 25th Anniversary Ale: Profit Motive, Star Trek Klingon Imperial Porter, Star Trek Symbiosis, and Star Trek Mirror Universe.

In the summer of 2017, Shmaltz Brewing Company and Clown Shoes Beer joined to create a collaboration beer that blended Shmaltz's Jewbelation 11 with Clown Shoes' Billionaire Barleywine in Wild Turkey bourbon barrels for over two months producing the limited-edition Shoebelation. And in the autumn of that year, Shmaltz collaborated with Vermont alternative rock radio station 102.7 WEQX on a brew called Independent Ale.

In 2018, Shmaltz began to offer Hop Momma IPA – brewed with peach, apricot, and habanero pepper – in cans.

Shmaltz's year-round core brands during this period included Slingshot American Craft Lager, Messiah Brown Ale, Hop Manna IPA, and Hop Momma IPA. Limited releases have included Jewbelation 22, No Shtick Double Dry Hopped Double IPA, R.I.P.A. Rye Double IPA, Hanukkah Dark Ale), two releases in its 518 Craft line (Foggy Goggles, 518 NEIPA), and draft-only offerings Funky Blender (Barrel Aged Amber Sour) and She'Brew (Double Dry Hopped Double NE India Pale Ale), which raises money for breast cancer awareness.

== Contract brewing and consulting ==
During this period Shmaltz Brewing used its Clifton Park facility for contract brewing services as well as for the production of its own brews. Beginning at 4,000 barrels and increasing to 30,000 in its fifth year, its contract brewing operations served clients including Alchemy and Science (a subsidiary of Boston Beer Company) after it bought the Coney Island line from Shmaltz; Bronx Brewery, its largest customer in 2017; San Francisco's Speakeasy Ales & Lagers; Heartland Brewery, and Foreign Objects Beer.

Shmaltz provided advisory and consulting services for brewers in Clifton Park and continues to provide these services for regional and new brewing projects.

== 2018–present: Troy, NY and Alphabet City ==
In 2018–2019, the company sold its Clifton Park production facility to SingleCut Beersmiths and returned to its roots as a contract brewer.

In July of the same year, Shmaltz opened a new home in Troy, New York for its Upstate New York-focused 518/838 brands and portfolio of craft beers, 518 Craft, operating under a New York State Farm Brewery License that permits brewers to serve beer by the glass without an additional permit. The facility includes a tasting room and bottle shop on Monument Square in downtown Troy. The tasting room opened in July 2018 and during the COVID-19 pandemic added a chocolate shop and coffee shop.

By 2018, Shmaltz had acquired Alphabet City Brewing Company, which had been founded on New York City's Lower East Side in 2012. Shmaltz rebranded the graphics and product names and continues to market the Alphabet City brands in New York City, where they are distributed by Manhattan Beer. Alphabet City brands include the year-round 7th Street Blonde Ale and Village IPA and specialty releases such as Sugar Plum Fairy dark ale, Black Tart sour ale, and Loisaida Milkshake IPA.

In its 2017–2018 season Shmaltz donated a portion of the proceeds from its She'Brew Double IPA to Planned Parenthood and the Pink Boots Society scholarship fund. In 2020, the company teamed with Moustache Brewing to release She'Brew #RBG IPA, a tribute to Ruth Bader Ginsburg, for a pandemic-delayed International Women's Collaboration Brew Day. A portion of the profits go to the ACLU Women's Rights Project and the Pink Boots Society. Shmaltz also marked Hanukkah and the company's 24th birthday by releasing Golden Jelly Doughnut Pastry Ale.

== 25th anniversary ==
In September 2021, marking its 25th anniversary, Shmaltz Brewing announced the farewell season of the Shmaltz brand with new and vintage releases including a one-season-only brew called Exodus 2021 Barleywine Ale. The company also announced a nationwide "Farewell to Shmaltz Tour" which began with ProBrewer's "Class of '96" event during the Craft Brewers Conference in Denver, Colorado on September 10, 2021, coordinated by Cowan.

Cowan retained his staff and the company pivoted to focus on Alphabet City Brewing Company, the 518 Craft tasting room in Troy, and a consulting practice helping other craft brewers.

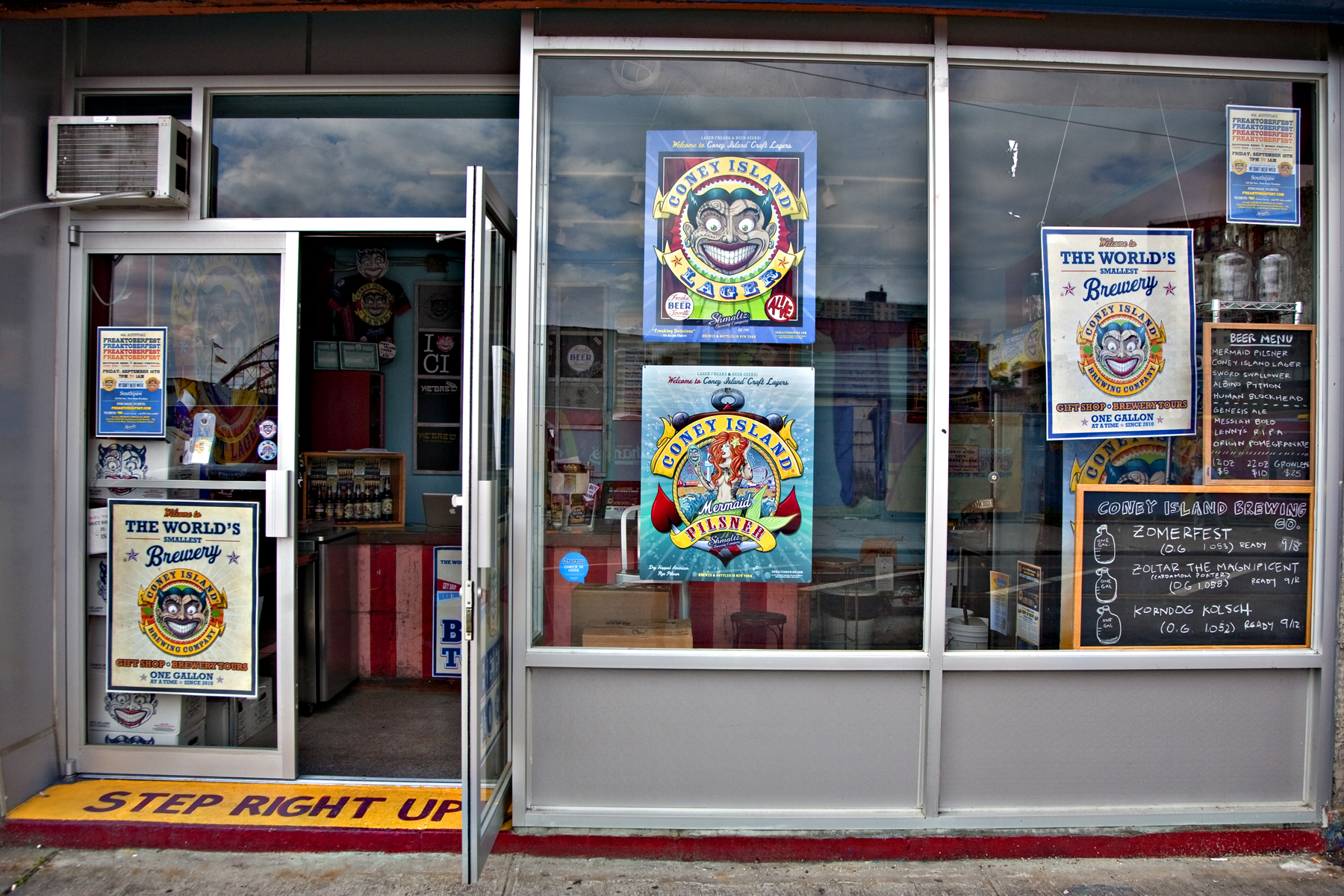
Coney Island Brewing Company, established in 2010 on the corner of W 12th Street and Surf Avenue, in Coney Island, New York.

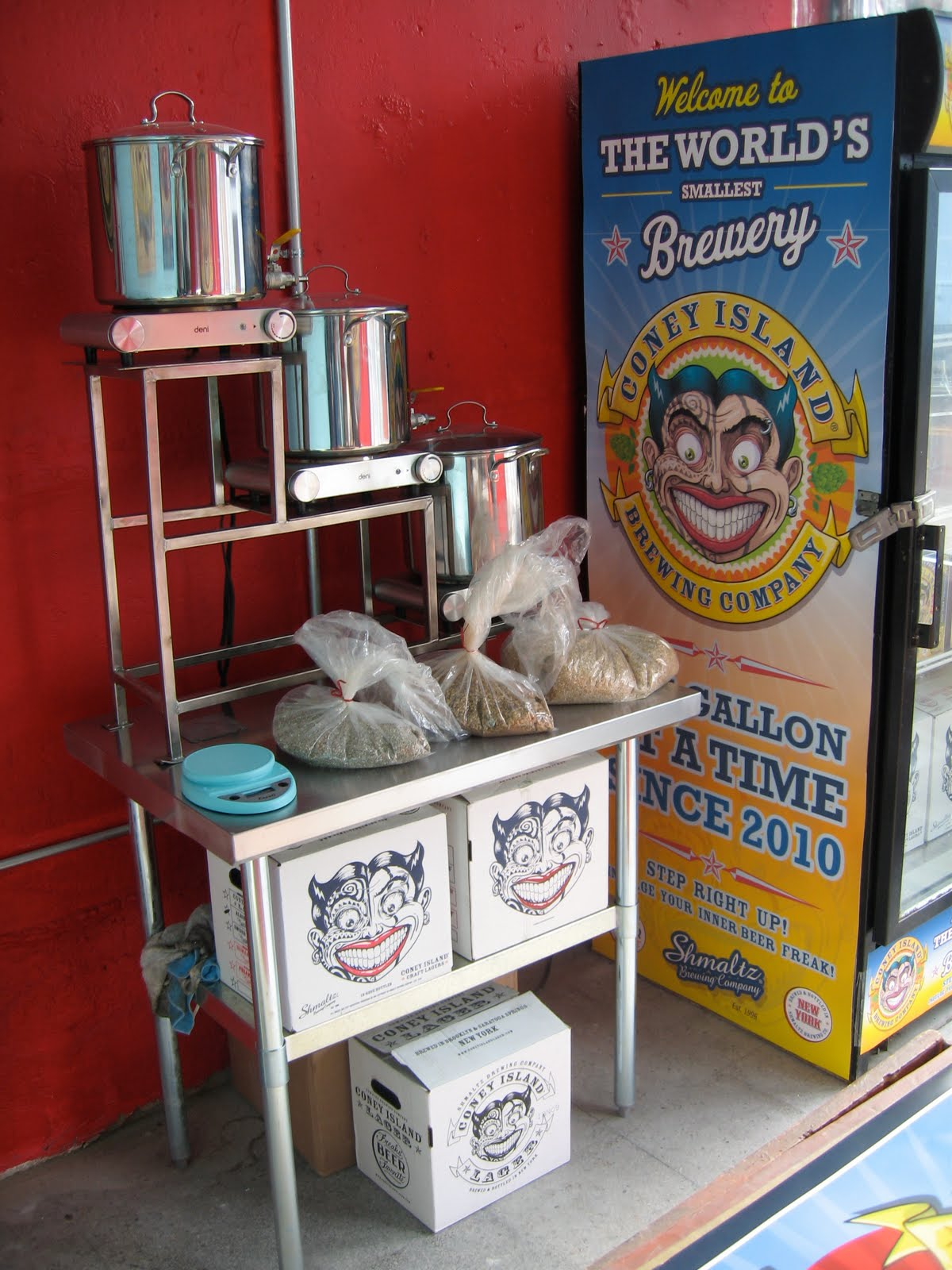
On August 10, 2011 Coney Island Brewing Company was certified as the "World's Smallest Commercial Brewery" by the World Records Academy. Average brew batch size is one gallon.

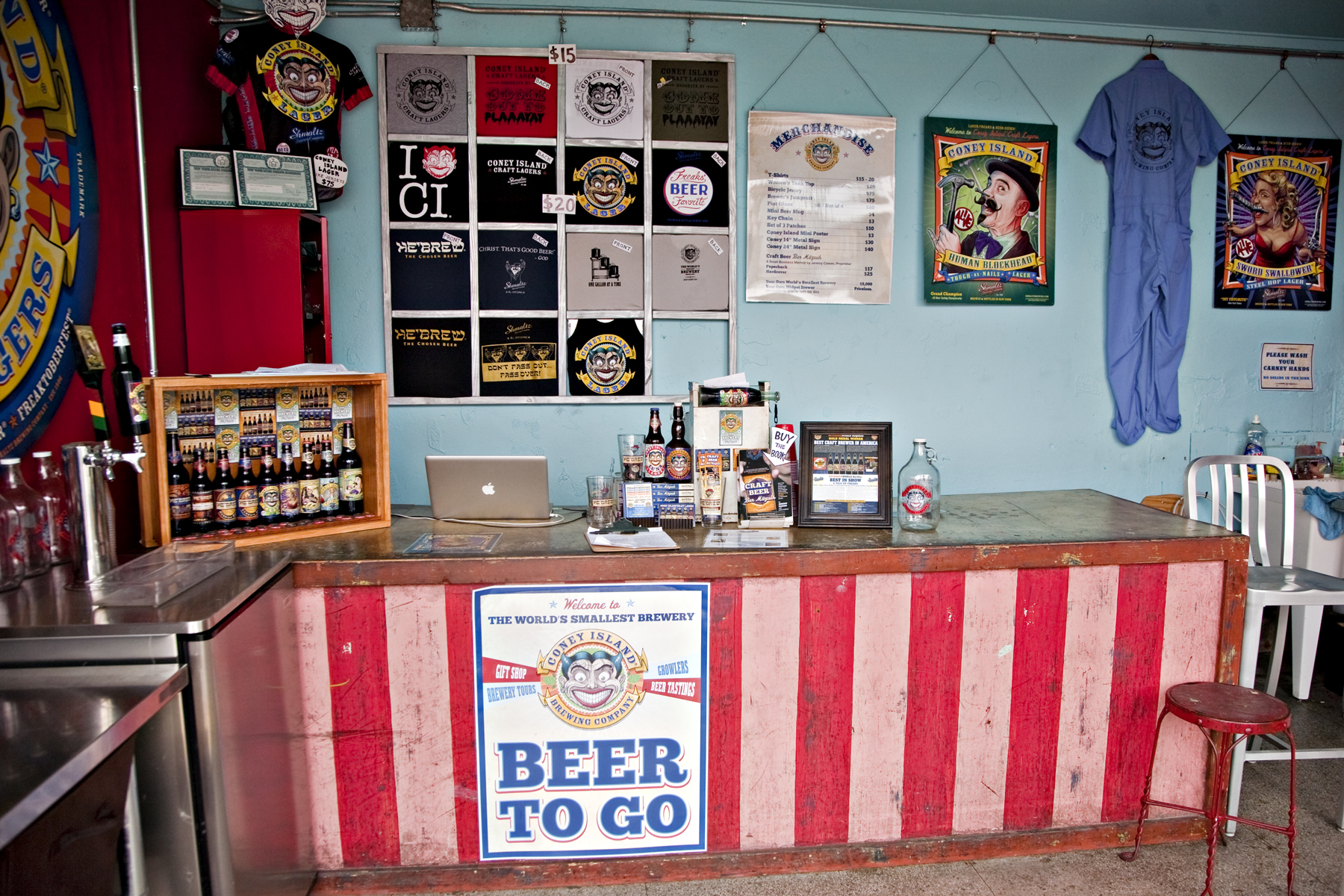
HE'BREW Beer and Coney Island Craft Lagers merchandise at Coney Island Brewing Company.

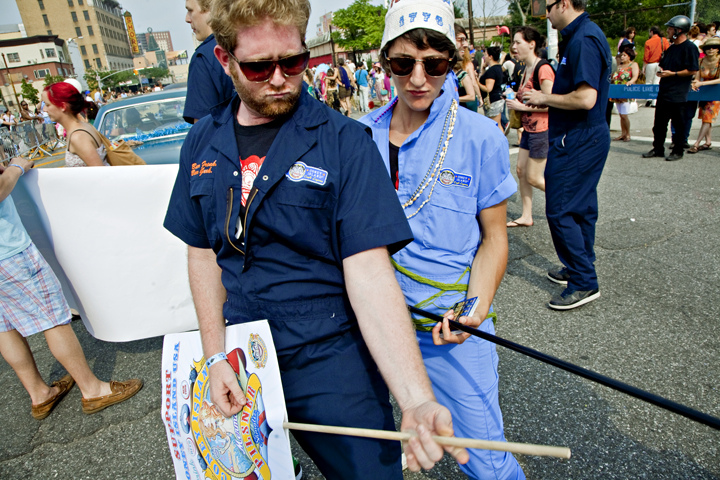
Shmaltz Brewing Company employees break into an impromptu air guitar solo on the Mermaid Parade route.

== See also ==
- Beer in the United States
- Barrel-aged beer
