= Covington Brewhouse =

Brewery in Louisiana, United States

Coordinates: 30°28′40.01″N 90°5′55.86″W

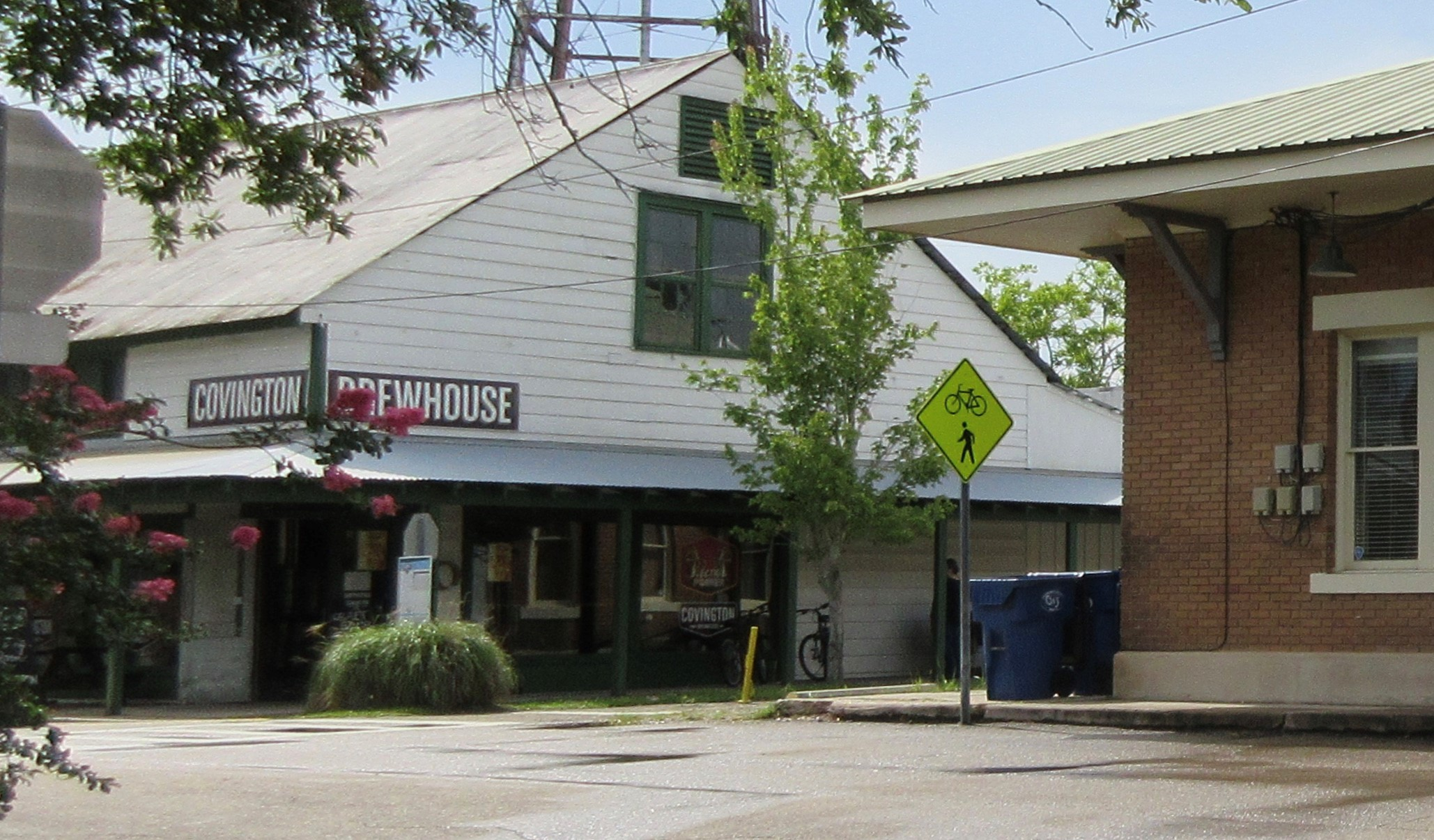
- Industry: Alcoholic beverage
- Founded: 2005
- Headquarters: Covington, Louisiana; United States
- Products: Beer
- Website: covingtonbrewhouse.com

Covington Brewhouse was a brewery in the historic district of downtown Covington, Louisiana.

The brewery itself is operated in the old Alexius Hardware building which is situated between the 100-year-old train depot, the landmark water tower, and the city's trailhead park.

The brewery produces year round beers including Pontchartrain Pilsner, Bayou Bock, and Strawberry Ale. Several seasonal beers are also manufactured as well as various contract brews for restaurants in Covington, New Orleans, and the surrounding area. The company brewed Dixie beer temporarily following Hurricane Katrina when the Dixie brewing facilities were damaged by the storm.

Covington Brewhouse was founded in 2005 as Heiner Brau when it was the third brewery established in Louisiana after Prohibition (following Abita), and Crescent City Brewhouse, established in 1991, by local contractor Fritz Schroth. Since that time the brewery has increased its capacity and has become increasingly involved in community events such as Taps on the Trace and the Rockin' the Rails concert series.

As of January 25, 2019, the brewery is closed. It was sold to new owners who have not announced plans for the location.

== See also ==
- List of breweries in Louisiana
- List of defunct breweries in the United States
