= New Orleans Lager and Ale Brewing Company =

Coordinates: 29.9200402°N 90.0834235°W

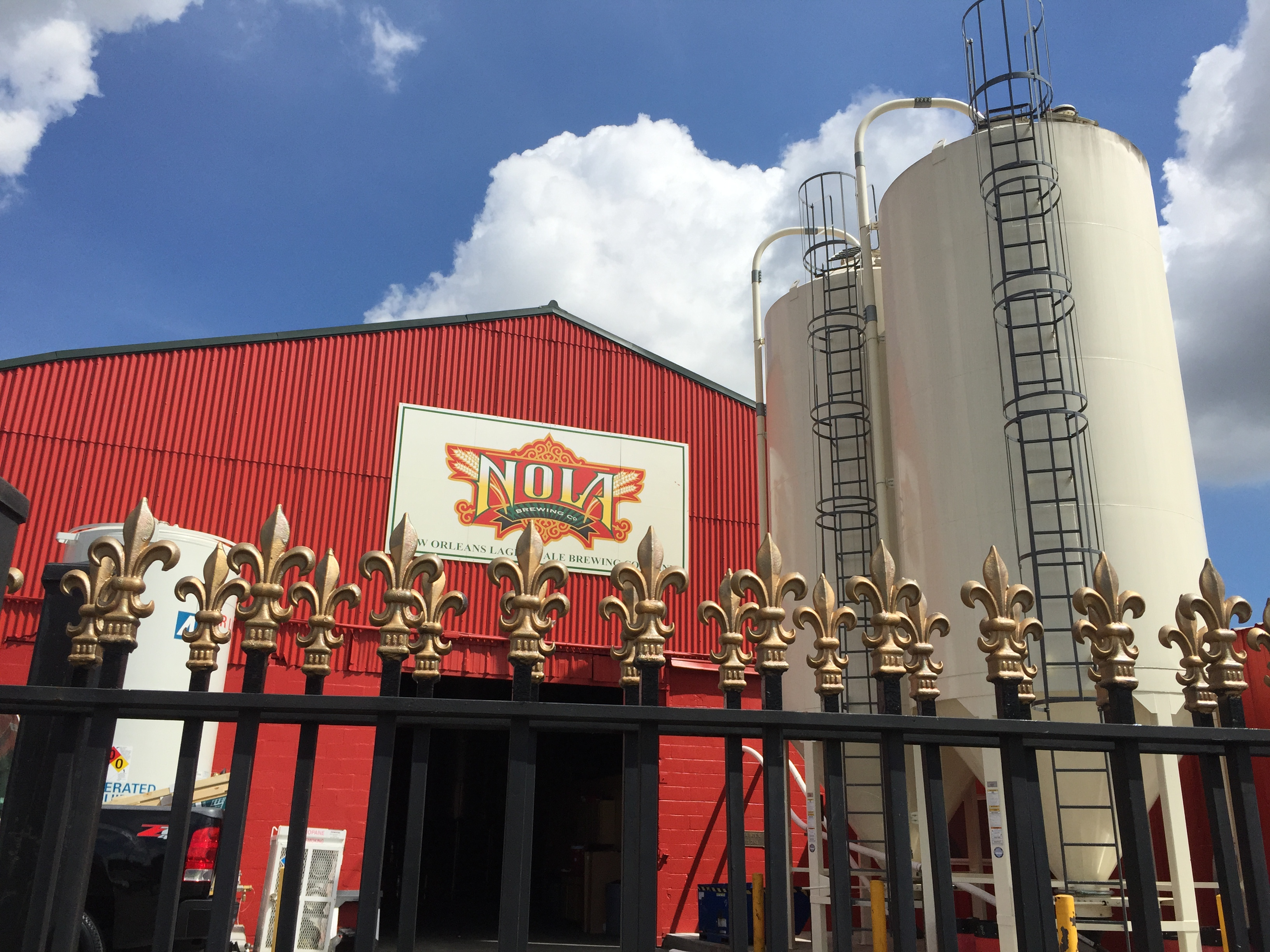
- The brewery in 2015
- Industry: Alcoholic beverage
- Founded: March 2008
- Headquarters: New Orleans, Louisiana, US
- Products: Beer
- Owner: Kirk Coco
- Website: http://www.nolabrewing.com

New Orleans Lager and Ale Brewing Company, commonly called NOLA Brewing Company, is a brewery in New Orleans, Louisiana, United States. The brewery is located in a converted old warehouse building at the corner of Tchoupitoulas and Seventh Streets in Uptown New Orleans.

Following the closure of the Dixie Brewing Company facility after Hurricane Katrina in 2005, no commercial brewery operated in New Orleans until NOLA Brewing Company produced its first craft beer in 2009. They celebrated their 7th year of production in 2016 with special releases.

NOLA Brewing Company is currently served in bars throughout the Southeast United States, as well as full sized kegs and draft packs sold at grocery stores throughout Louisiana.

== See also ==
- Beer in the United States
- List of breweries in Louisiana
- Microbrewery
