= Red River Brewing Company =

Red River Brewing Company may refer to:

== Companies ==
- Red River Brewing Company (Louisiana), brewing company in Shreveport, Louisiana
- Red River Brewing Company (New Mexico), brewing company in Red River, New Mexico
