= Gnarly =

Gnarly may refer to:

- Gnarly (slang), within surf subculture
- Gnarly, within cycling
- Gnarly Davidson, an alter ego of CeeLo Green
- "Gnarly" (song), by Katseye, 2025
- "Gnarly", a song by Kodak Black from Dying to Live
- Gnarly Knuckles, the Boscage Maze counterpart of Knuckles from Sonic Prime

== See also ==
- Gnarly Barley Brewing Company
- The Gnarly Man, a science fiction story by American writer L. Sprague de Camp
- Gnarly Buttons, a composition for solo clarinet and chamber ensemble by the American composer John Adams
