= Bayou Teche Brewing =

Brewery in Arnaudville, Louisiana, U.S.

Bayou Teche Brewery

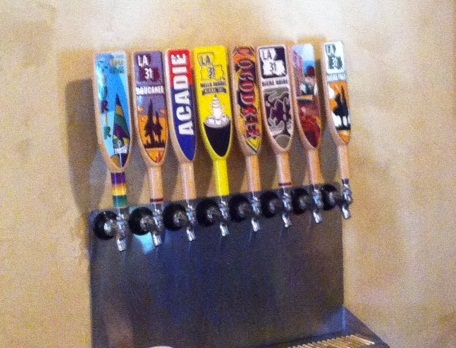
- Various beers by Bayou Teche
- Interactive map of Bayou Teche Brewery
- Type: Brewery
- Location: Arnaudville, Louisiana
- Coordinates: 30°23′30.5″N 91°55′30.5″W
- Opened: St. Patrick's Day 2009
- Key people: Karlos, Byron and Dorsey Knott
- Website: bayoutechebrewing.com

Active beers
LA-31Bière Pale, LA-31 Bière Noire, LA-31 Passionné
Name	Type

Other beers
LA-31 Boucanée, Acadie
Name	Type

Bayou Teche Brewing is a brewery in Arnaudville, Louisiana, USA. Bayou Teche Brewing, named for the nearby Bayou Teche, was formed by three brothers, Karlos, Byron and Dorsey Knott, when they started brewing in an abandoned railcar on St. Patrick's Day in 2009.

== History ==
The company first began selling beer in January 2010. Karlos, the head Brewmaster for Bayou Teche, grew an interest in quality beer while stationed as an Army cavalry scout in Germany. Once he returned to the US in 1994 and was stationed in Ft. Lewis in Washington state, he began experimenting with microbrewing at home. The primary intention of the beer creation process was to create beers that would complement well with Cajun and Creole cuisine. The website AskMen named Bayou Teche as one of their Top 10 best microbreweries in the United States. Bayou Teche Brewing has produced 11 beers total, including 5 year-round beers (LA-31Bière Pale, LA-31 Bière Noire, LA-31 Passionné, LA-31 Boucanée, and Acadie). Bayou Teche beer is distributed in five states currently, including native Louisiana and New York.

Its flagship beer is the LA-31 Bière Pale, which won a Silver Medal in the World Beer Championships in 2013, scoring 89 points out of 100. According to the Beverage Tasting Institute, who holds the competition, the tasting notes of the Belgian-style pale ale contain “Aromas of grainy corn flour, nut brittle, lettuce and roasted turnips are interestingly taco-like with a round dryish medium-to-full body body and crisp, okra and grassy hop bite.” It is recommended to be paired with red beans and rice, jambalaya, gumbo and hot boudin.

A unique beer made for smoked Cajun food is LA-31 Boucanée, which is made using smoked cherrywood, a common tree in south Louisiana. The beer has a “sweet smoky taste that can remind you of standing downwind from a smokehouse or campfire.”

Acadie has its roots in Cajun culture and is “brewed as a Bière de Garde – a centuries old French style of farmhouse seasonal brew.”

Another year-round beer is their “Bière Noire”, which was modeled after a German style brewing process which made a schwarzbier with ale yeast instead of lager yeast. It is recommended as a complement to grilled food.

Bayou Teche Brewing has issued several compilation albums of local Cajun musicians.

== See also ==
- List of breweries in Louisiana

== Discography ==
- En Français - Cajun 'N' Creole Rock 'N' Roll (2011, Bayou Teche Brewing)
- En Français Vol. 2 (2012, Bayou Teche Brewing BTP-CD-0002)
- The Best of Valcour Records: Volume I, 2006-2011 (2012, Bayou Teche Brewery/Valcour Records CD 0018)
