= Jim Patton (brewer) =

American anthropologist and craft beer brewer (1953–2012)

- Born: February 24, 1953
- Died: October 23, 2012 (aged 59); Miami, Florida, U.S.
- Education: Washington and Lee University
- Occupations: Anthropologist, craft beer brewer

Jim Patton (February 24, 1953 – October 23, 2012) was an American anthropologist and craft beer brewer. He was considered one of the pioneers in the craft beer brewing industry. He was one of the founders of the Abita Brewing Company in Abita Springs, Louisiana. He also brewed beer for Key West Brewery and Wynwood Brewing in Miami, Florida

Patton's first career was as a cultural anthropologist. He received a doctorate in the subject from Washington and Lee University. His specialty was Andean agricultural economics. Patton taught at Southeastern Louisiana University in Hammond, Louisiana and Xavier University of Louisiana. He eventually quit those jobs to become a full-time brewer.

Patton co-founded the Abita Brewing Company in 1986. The first Abita Beer debuted on July 4 that same year in New Orleans and Mandeville, Louisiana. Abita Brewing Company was the first craft brewery to open in the South. Patton was instrumental in creating many of the recipes for the beers that Abita still produces today.

Patton sold his share in the Abita Brewing Company in 1997 and co-founded the Zea Rotisserie and Brewery where he was also the brewmaster. Later, he would brew beer for Key West Brewery and Wynwood Brewery in Miami, Florida. Patton was also interested in wine making and worked for wineries in California and Oregon.

Jim Patton died in Miami on October 23, 2012.
