= List of breweries in Louisiana =

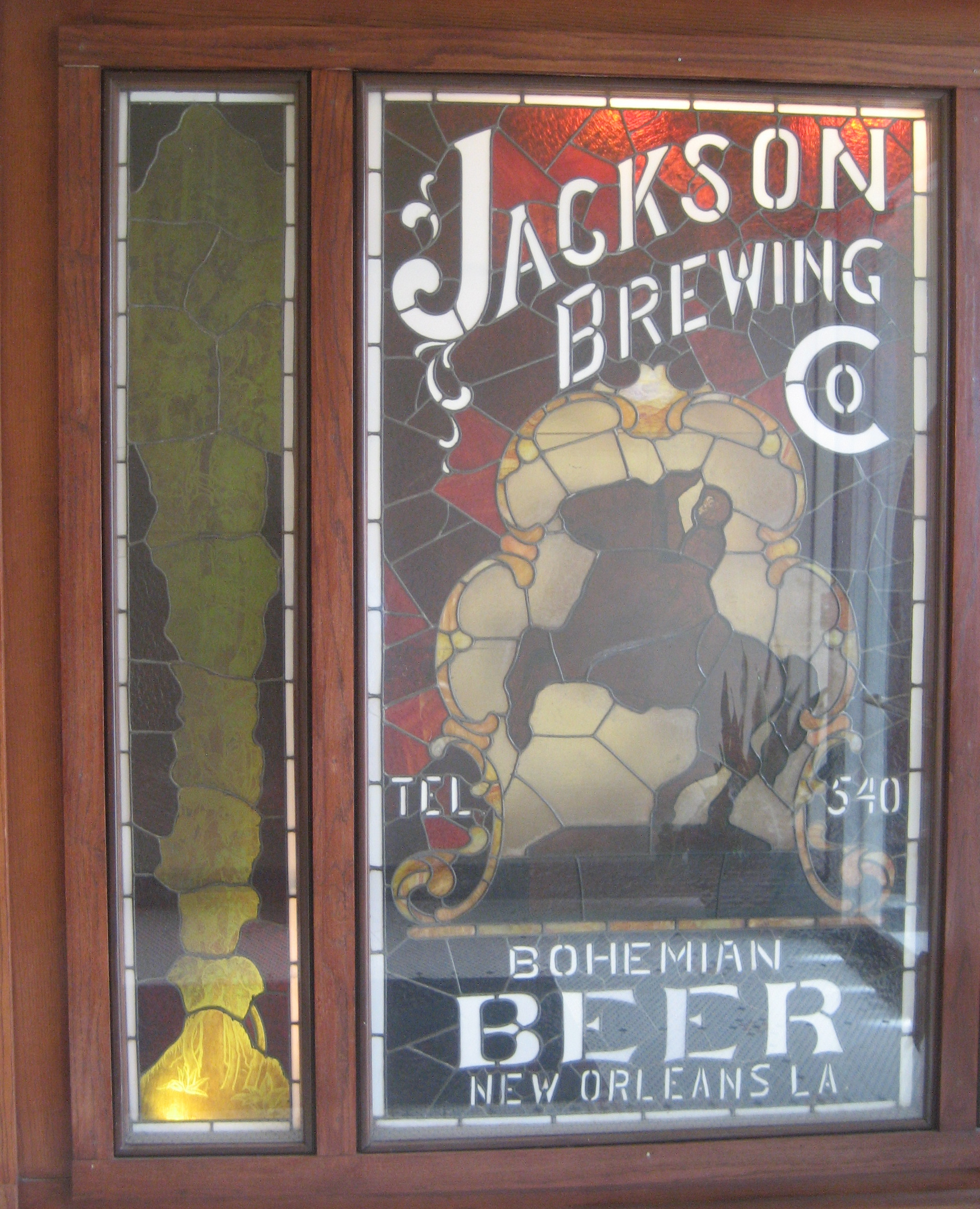
Stained glass panel from the Jackson Brewing Company, New Orleans

Breweries in Louisiana produce a wide range of beers in different styles that are marketed locally, regionally, and nationally. Brewing companies vary widely in the volume and variety of beer produced, from small nanobreweries to microbreweries to massive multinational conglomerate macrobreweries.

In 2014, Louisiana's 37 breweries and brewpubs, and 66 distributors, and hundreds of retailers employed more than 15,000 people directly, and more than 10,000 others in related industries. Including people directly employed in brewing, as well as those who supply Louisiana's breweries with everything from ingredients to machinery, the total business and personal tax revenue generated by Louisiana's breweries and related industries was more than $380 million. Consumer purchases of Louisiana's brewery products generated more than $150 million in additional tax revenue. In 2014, according to the Brewers Association, Louisiana ranked 36th (out of 51 including Washington, D.C.) in the number of craft breweries per capita with 15.

For context, at the end of 2013 there were 2,822 breweries in the United States, including 2,768 craft breweries subdivided into 1,237 brewpubs, 1,412 microbreweries and 119 regional craft breweries. In that same year, according to the Beer Institute, the brewing industry employed around 43,000 Americans in brewing and distribution and had a combined economic impact of more than $246 billion.

== History ==
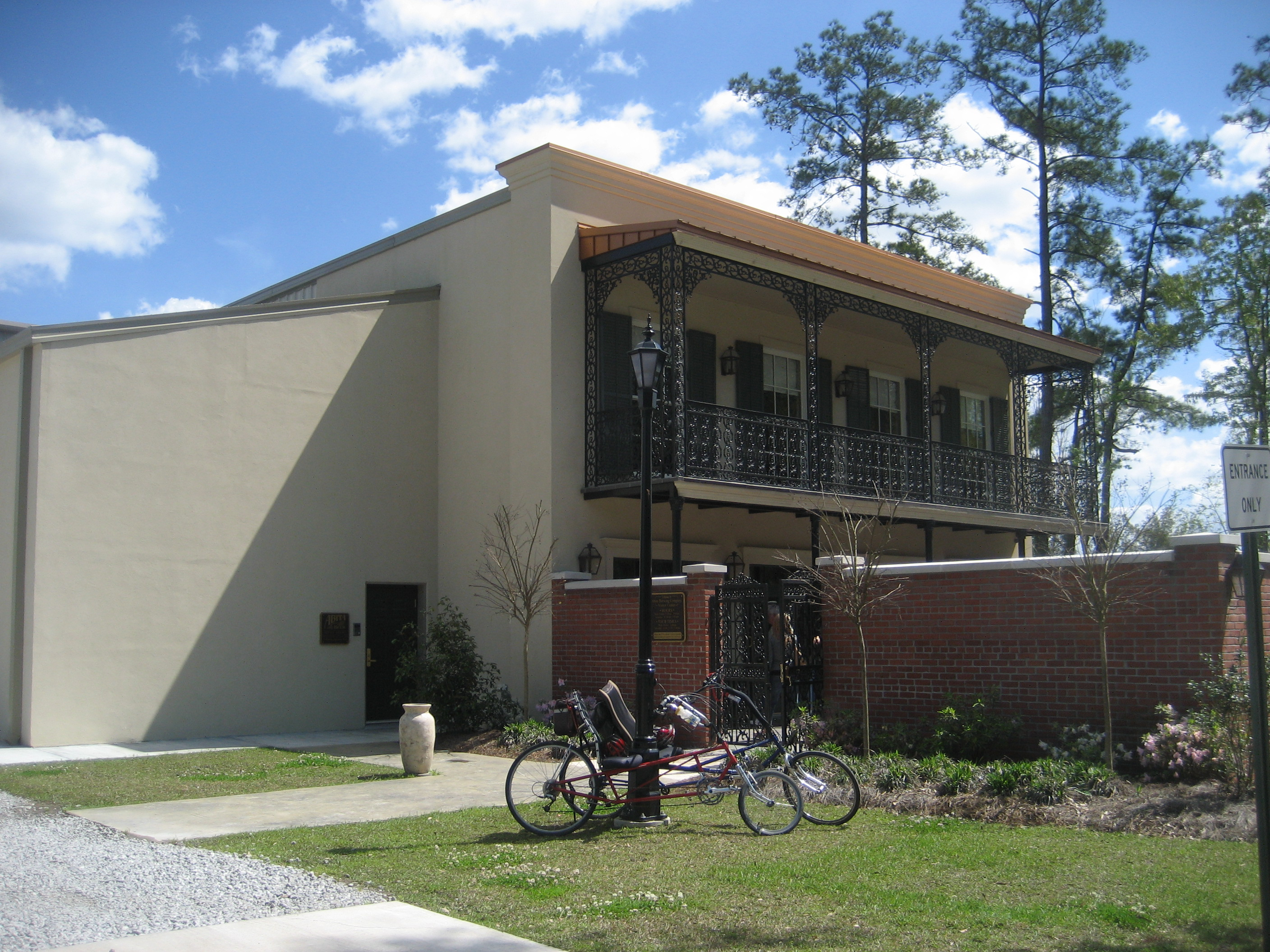
Abita Brewing Company

In the nineteenth and twentieth century, New Orleans was the hub of breweries in Louisiana. The first manufacturing establishment in the city of New Orleans was a brewery built by Pierre Dreux called La Brassiere in January 1723. In 1852, Louis and Samuel Fasnacht purchased property on Poeyfarre Street and started Fasnacht Brewery, which they sold to Erath and Company Brewery in 1869. The New Orleans Brewing Assoc. (1890) was founded out of a six brewery merger at the site of Louisiana Brewing Co. (1885). The brewery was located at Jackson Avenue and Tchoupitoulas Street and brands included 4-X Beer, Double Eagle Ale and Eagle Beer.

Jackson Brewing Co. opened in 1890 on Decatur Street, Regal beer made at the American Brewing Co. (1891) on Bienville Street, Columbia Brewing Co. (1899) on Elysian Fields Avenue, Dixie Brewing Co. (1907) on Tulane Avenue, National Brewing Co. (1911) on Gravier Street, Union Brewing Corp. (1911) on N. Robertson Street and Falstaff Brewing Corp. (1936) on Gravier Street.

The next chapter of brewing in Louisiana began in 1986 with the opening of the Abita Brewing Co. Following a nationwide trend of opening craft breweries like Abita, the beginning of the twenty-first century has seen craft breweries opening statewide.

== Breweries ==
Dixie Beer brewed by the Dixie Brewing Company

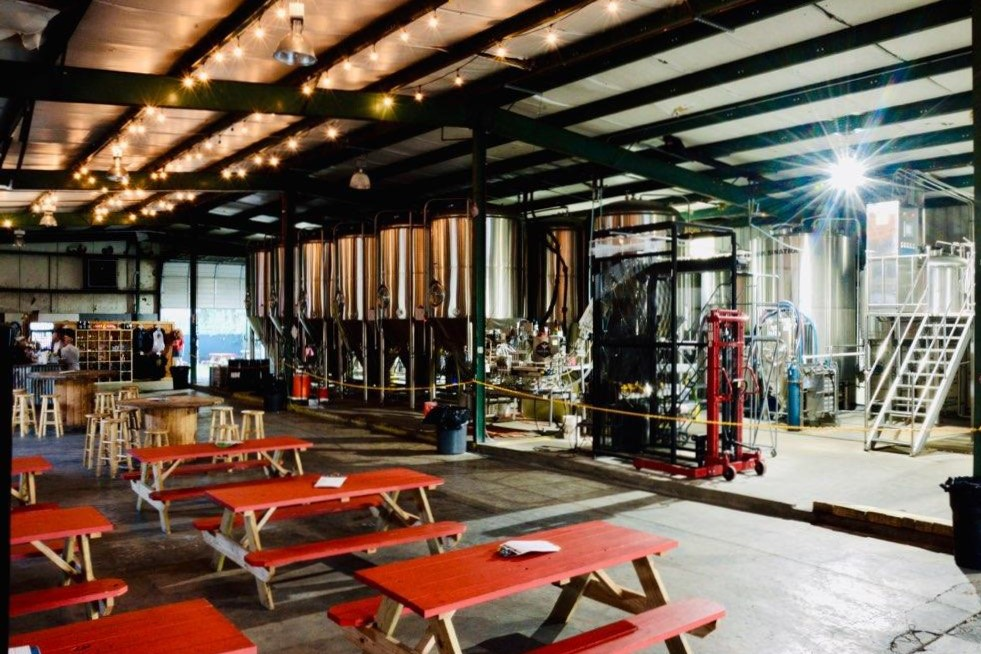
Gnarly Barley Brewing Company

Brewery	Type	Location	Founded	On-site
Abita Brewing Company	Regional	Covington	1986	Taproom
All Relation Beer	Microbrewery	New Orleans	2019	Taproom
Bayou Teche Brewing	Microbrewery	Arnaudville	2010	Taproom
Brieux Carré Brewing	Microbrewery	New Orleans	2017	Taproom
Broken Wheel Brewery	Microbrewery/Brewpub	Marksville	2015	Taproom
Chafunkta Brewing Company	Microbrewery	Mandeville	2013	Taproom
Courtyard Brewery	Microbrewery	New Orleans	2014	Taproom
Crescent City Brewhouse	Brewpub	New Orleans	1991	Taproom
Crying Eagle Brewing Company	Microbrewery/Brewpub	Lake Charles	2016	Taproom
Faubourg Brewing Company	Regional	New Orleans	1907	Taproom
Flying Heart Brewing & Pub	Microbrewery	Bossier City	2015	Taproom
Flying Tiger Brewery	Microbrewery	Monroe	2016	Taproom
Gnarly Barley Brewing Company	Microbrewery	Hammond	2014	Taproom
Gordon Biersch Brewing Company	Brewpub (National chain)	New Orleans	2004	Taproom
Miel Brewery and Taproom	Microbrewery	New Orleans	2018	Taproom
Mudbug Brewery	Microbrewery	Thibodaux	2014	Taproom
New Orleans Lager and Ale Brewing Company (NOLA)	Microbrewery	New Orleans	2009	Taproom
Oak St Brewery	Microbrewery	New Orleans	2021	Taproom
Old Rail Brewing Company	Brewpub	Mandeville	2013	Taproom
Ouachita Brewing Company	Microbrewery	West Monroe	2015	Taproom
Parish Brewing Company	Microbrewery	Broussard	2010	Taproom
Parleaux Beer Lab	Microbrewery	New Orleans	2017	Taproom
Port Orleans Brewing Company	Microbrewery	New Orleans	2017	Taproom
Red River Brewing Company	Microbrewery/Brewpub	Shreveport	2013	Taproom
Second Line Brewing	Microbrewery	New Orleans	2015	Taproom
Urban South Brewery	Regional	New Orleans	2016	Taproom

== Closed breweries ==
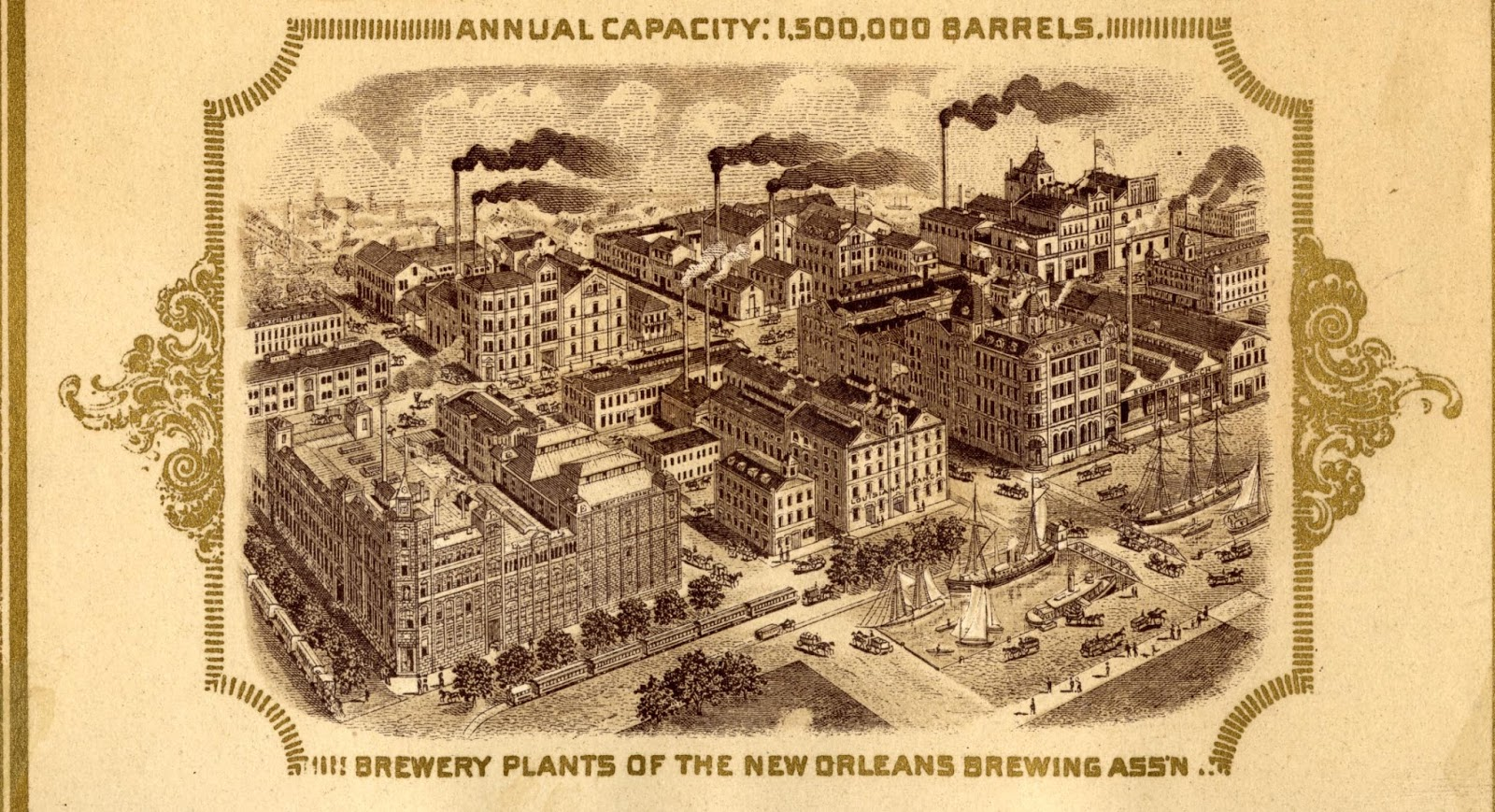
New Orleans Brewing Association Brewery (1890–1899), later the New Orleans Brewing Company Inc.

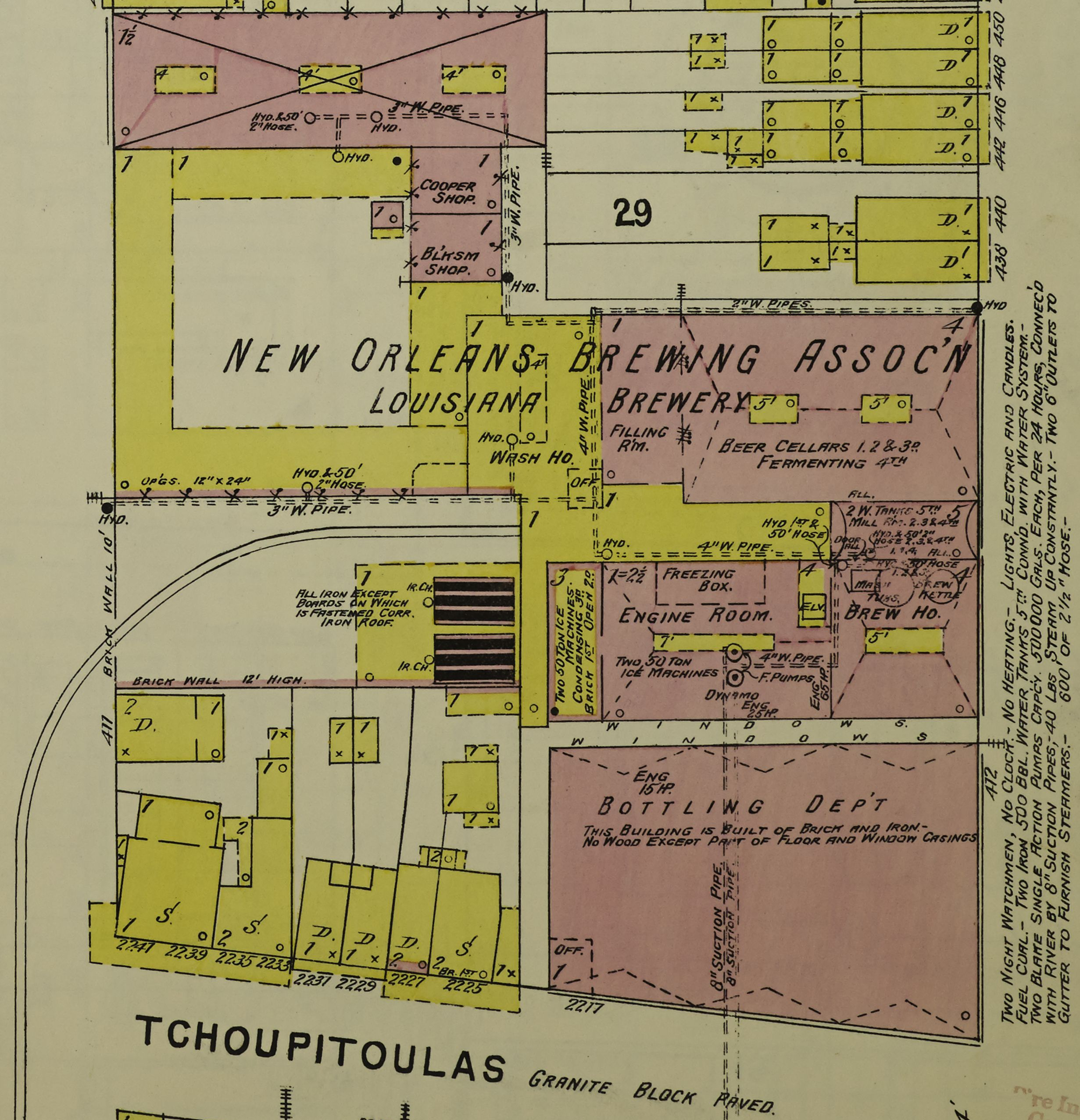
New Orleans Brewing Association Brewery in 1896, Sanborn Fire Insurance Map of New Orleans

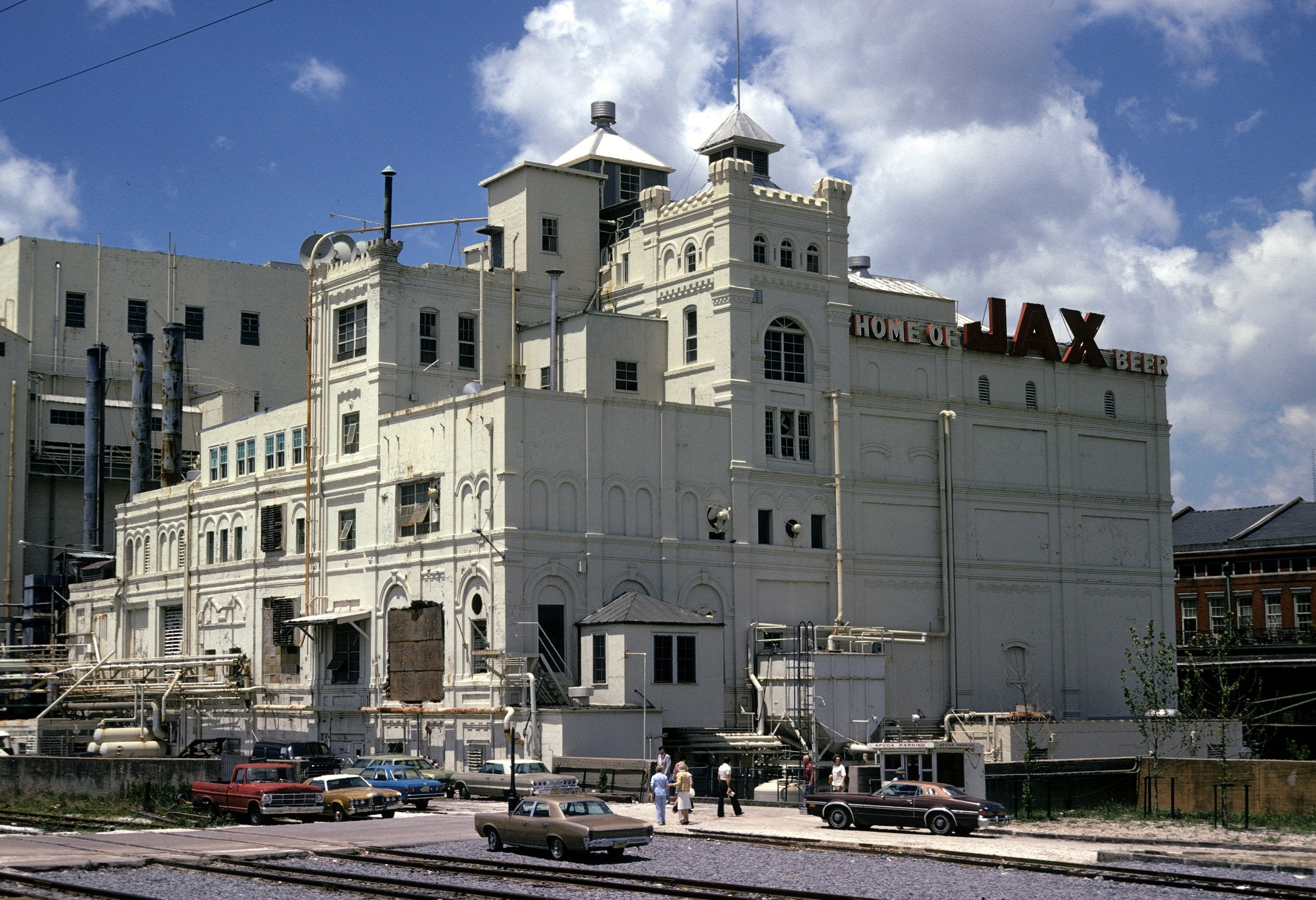
Jackson Brewery in 1976, New Orleans

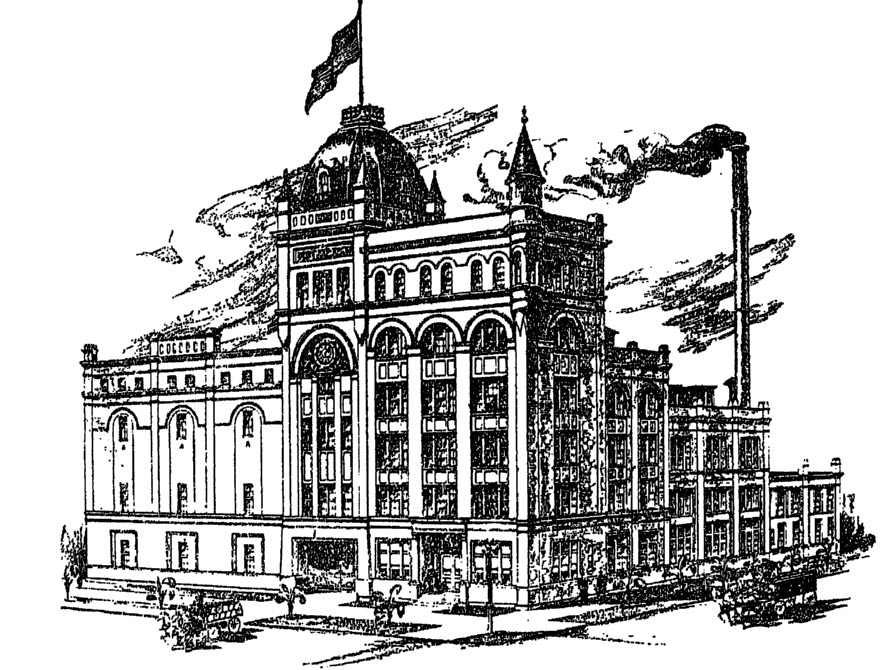
Original Dixie Brewery on Tulane Avenue in 1907, New Orleans

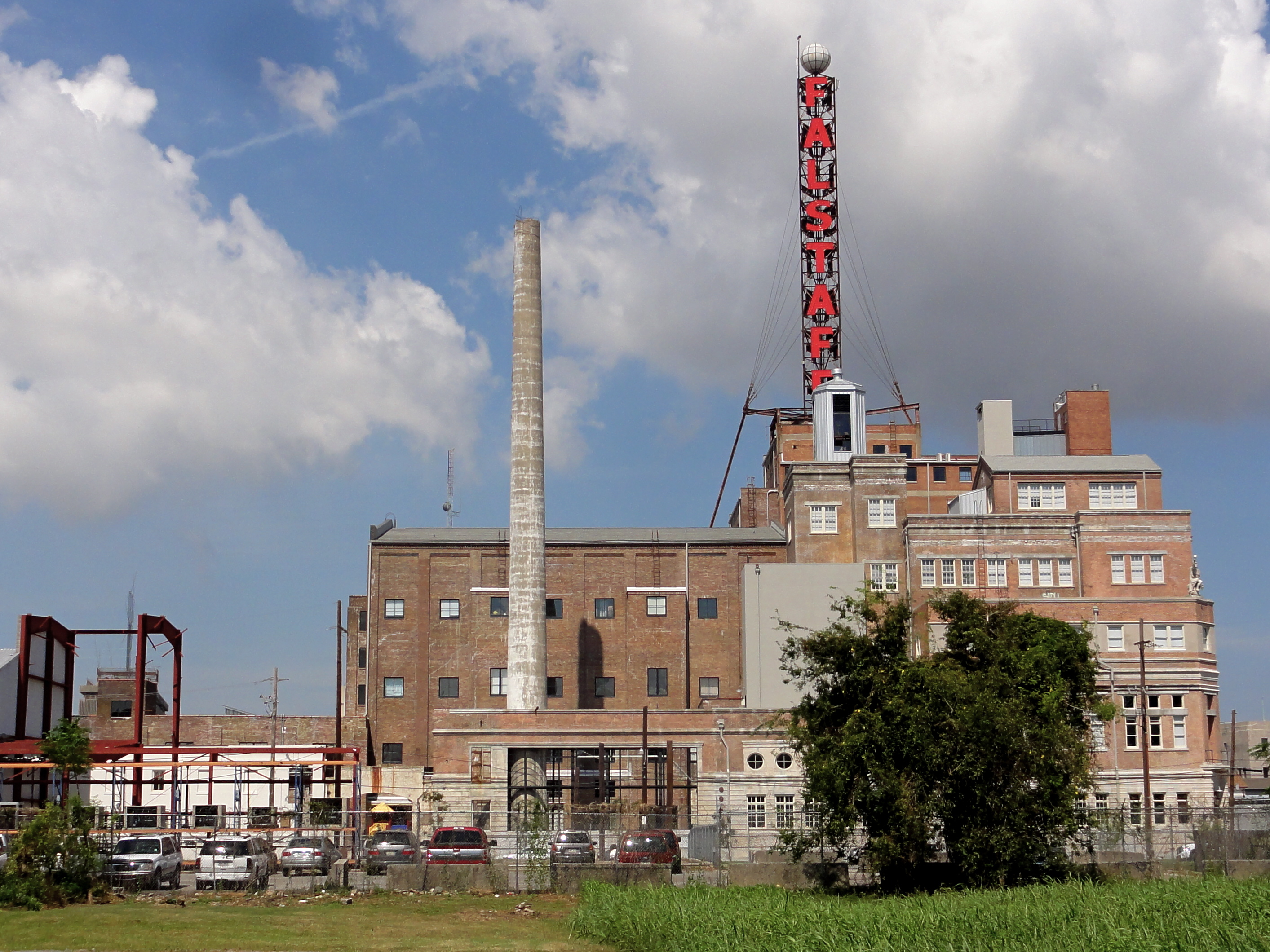
Falstaff Brewery building, New Orleans

Brewery	Type	Location	Founded	Dissolved	
40 Arpent Brewing Company	Microbrewery	Arabi	2014	2017	
American Brewing Company (New Orleans)	Regional	New Orleans	1891	1962	Founded as American Brewing Company in 1891, renamed American Beverage Company in 1933, renamed American Brewing Company in 1934. Brewed Regal Beer.
Cajun Brewing	Microbrewery	Lafayette	2015	2018	
Cane River Brewing	Microbrewery	Natchitoches	2018	2022	Brewery and taproom taken over by Bossier City-based Flying Heart.
Chappapeela Farms Brewery	Microbrewery/Brewpub	Amite City	2015	2015	
CottonPort Brewing	Microbrewery	Sterlington	2016	2016	
Covington Brewhouse	Microbrewery	Covington	2005	2018	Founded as Heiner Brau Brewery in 2005, renamed Covington Brewhouse in 2012.
Falstaff Brewing Corporation	National	New Orleans	1911	1979	Founded as National Brewing Company in 1911, renamed National Beverage Company in 1920, renamed National Industrial Alcohol Co. Inc. Brewery in 1921, purchased by Falstaff in 1936. The brewery building was repurposed as an apartment building in 2008.
Jackson Brewing Company	Regional	New Orleans	1890	1974	Founded as Jackson Bohemian Brewery in 1890, renamed Jax Beer, renamed Jackson Brewing Company. The brewery building now contains residences, shops and restaurants.
La Brasserie Brewery		New Orleans	1723	Unknown	First brewery in Louisiana.
Louisiana Purchase Brewing Company	Microbrewery	Ponchatoula	2017	2019	
New Orleans Brewing Company Inc.		New Orleans	1890	1949	Founded as the New Orleans Brewing Association in 1890, renamed New Orleans Brewing Company in 1900, renamed New Orleans Brewing Company Inc. in 1933.
Southern Craft Brewing Company		Baton Rouge	2016	2021	
Wayward Owl Brewing	Microbrewery	New Orleans	2016	2018	
Low Road Brewing	Microbrewery	Hammond	2017	2024	
Zony Mash Beer Project	Microbrewery	New Orleans	2019	2025	
Royal Brewery	Microbrewery	New Orleans	2017	2022?	
Calliope Beer Works	Brewpub	New Orleans	2023	2024	
Tin Roof Brewing Co	Microbrewery	Baton Rouge	2010	2024	

== See also ==
- Beer in the United States
- List of microbreweries
- List of cideries in the United States
- List of defunct breweries in the United States
