= Arnaudville, Louisiana =

- Town
- Town of Arnaudville
- Location of Arnaudville in St. Landry Parish, Louisiana.

- Location of Louisiana in the United States
- Coordinates: 30°24′08″N 91°55′55″W
- Country: United States
- State: Louisiana
- Parishes: St. Landry, St. Martin
- Incorporated: 1870

Area
  - Total: 0.71 sq mi (1.83 km^{2})
  - Land: 0.69 sq mi (1.80 km^{2})
  - Water: 0.015 sq mi (0.04 km^{2})
- Elevation: 23 ft (7.0 m)

Population (2020)
  - Total: 1,009
  - Density: 1,454.3/sq mi (561.52/km^{2})
- Time zone: UTC-6 (CST)
  - Summer (DST): UTC-5 (CDT)
- Area code: 337
- FIPS code: 22-03110
- GNIS feature ID: 2405170
- Website: www.arnaudvillela.com

Arnaudville is a town in St. Landry and St. Martin parishes in the U.S. state of Louisiana. The St. Martin Parish portion of Arnaudville is part of the Lafayette metropolitan statistical area, while the St. Landry Parish portion is part of the Opelousas–Eunice micropolitan statistical area. At the 2020 population estimates program, it had a population of 1,041.

== History ==
On the original site of an Attakapas Indian village, Arnaudville is one of the oldest remaining towns in St. Landry Parish. First settled by the French in the late 18th century and called La Murière, it was later known as La Jonction which translates from French as "The Junction," a tribute to the fact that the town is centered by the intersection of Bayou Teche and Bayou Fusilier. By the 19th century, the town was re-named once again, this time after the Arnaud family, which had donated a large amount of land to the town to establish a church for all (which still exists today).

Arnaudville was incorporated in 1870.

== Geography ==
Arnaudville is on the Bayou Teche where the Teche crosses from St. Landry Parish into St. Martin Parish. The town is called "La Jonction" by its French-speaking citizens since Arnaudville is located at the junction of Bayou Teche and Bayou Fuselier. According to the United States Census Bureau, the town has a total area of 0.7 square mile (1.9 km^{2}), all land.

== Demographics ==
Historical population
Census	Pop.	Note	%±
1880	140		—
1900	327		—
1910	279		−14.7%
1920	408		46.2%
1930	483		18.4%
1940	640		32.5%
1950	872		36.3%
1960	1,184		35.8%
1970	1,673		41.3%
1980	1,679		0.4%
1990	1,444		−14.0%
2000	1,398		−3.2%
2010	1,057		−24.4%
2020	1,009		−4.5%
2025 (est.)	991	▼	−1.8%
U.S. Decennial Census

Arnaudville racial composition as of 2020
Race	Number	Percentage
White (non-Hispanic)	845	83.75%
Black or African American (non-Hispanic)	116	11.5%
Asian	2	0.2%
Pacific Islander	2	0.2%
Other/Mixed	23	2.28%
Hispanic or Latino	21	2.08%

As of the 2020 United States census, there were 1,009 people, 498 households, and 311 families residing in the town. At the 2019 American Community Survey, the racial and ethnic makeup of the town was 71.3% non-Hispanic white, 18.0% Black and African American, 2.8% some other race, and 7.9% multiracial. In 2010, its racial makeup was 90.2% White American, 7.9% African American, 0.2% American Indian and Alaska Native, 0.9% multiracial, and 0.9% Hispanic or Latin American of any race. The 2000 census determined 88.63% were White American, 10.73% African American, 0.07% American Indian and Alaska Native, 0.07% Asian, 0.50% multiracial, and 1.57% Hispanic or Latin American of any race.

In 2019, the median age was 30.3 and 7.4% of the population were under 5 years of age. Approximately 72.2% were aged 18 and older, and 11.9% aged 65 and older. Of the population over the age of 5 in 2013, 65.1% spoke English and 34.9% spoke French (including Cajun). At the 2019 census estimates, French was the second most-spoken household language.

The median income for a household in the town was $37,727, up from $21,600 at the 2000 United States census. Males had a median income of $45,417 versus $24,722 for females. About 24.4% of the population lived at or below the poverty line, down from 25.6% at the 2000 census.

== Arts and culture ==
As of 2023, the town is host to the Étouffée Festival, held annually the fourth weekend in April; Le Feu et l'Eau ("Fire and Water") Rural Arts Celebration which is held in December; and Bayou Blues Revival which is held in April. Since 2005, attracted by its quaint setting and unique culture, the town has become a haven for artists and musicians from around the world.

=== Saint Luc French Immersion & Cultural Campus ===
The Saint Luc French Immersion & Cultural Campus French: Centre d'immersion linguistique et culturelle Saint Luc is located in Arnaudville. Led by president Mavis Frugé, the centre aims to preserve and promote Acadiana culture and Louisianian French.

The centre began in 2005 as an immersion workshop for Louisiana State University students, growing into the five-day Sur Les Deux Bayous immersion programme that partnered with several universities. In 2008, the centre began negotiations to purchase and renovate the closed Saint Luke’s hospital premises to give the centre a larger, more permanent location. In 2019, the centre officially took over ownership of the campus. Renovations, however, were temporarily delayed by the COVID-19 pandemic.

Arnaudville is home to Nunu artist collective, Bayou Teche Brewery, Maison Stephanie, and The Little Big Cup restaurant.

== Notable people ==
- Camille Bob, rhythm and blues singer and musician who led the dance band Lil' Bob and the Lollipops.
- Don Cravins, Jr., African American Democrat who served, consecutively, in both houses of the Louisiana State Legislature
- Joe Hall, accordionist playing in Creole la la, Cajun, and zydeco styles
- J. Minos Simon, attorney, anti-abortion activist, sportsman

== Sister City ==
- Jausiers, France
