= Abita Brewing Company =

American brewery in Louisiana

Coordinates: 30.4824087°N 90.056605°W

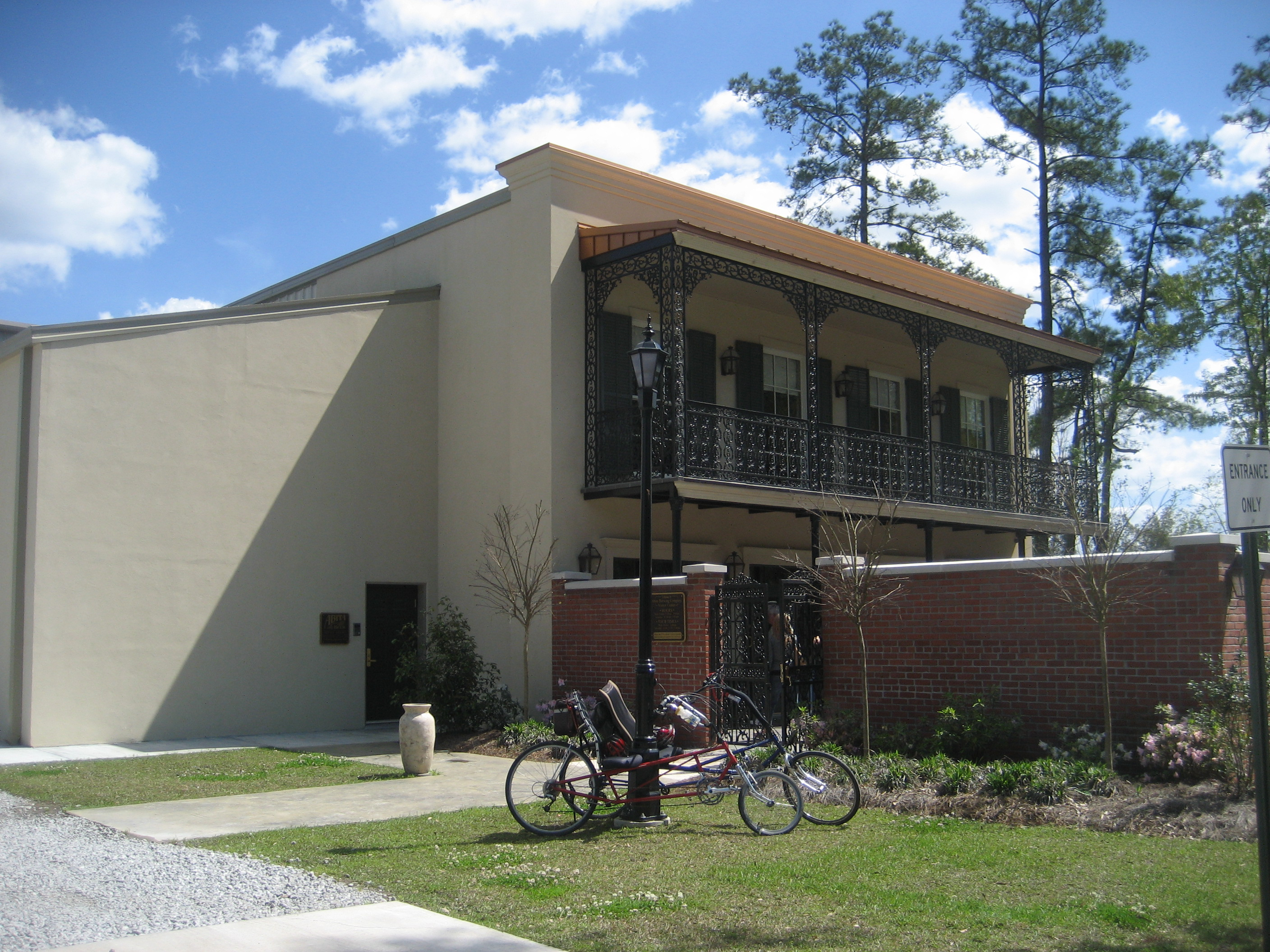
- Abita Brewing Company Brewery
- Industry: Alcoholic beverage
- Founded: 1986; 40 years ago
- Headquarters: Covington, Louisiana; United States
- Products: Beer
- Production output: 175,000 barrels
- Owner: Abita Brewing, LLC. Troy Ashley, President Mitch Steele, Director of Brewing; Chad Davis, Brewing Supervisor

The Abita Brewing Company is a brewery in Covington, Louisiana, located 43 miles (69 km) north of New Orleans. Founded by Jim Patton and Rush Cumming in 1986 in downtown Abita Springs, Louisiana, its original location has since been converted into the Abita Brew Pub.

== Brewery ==
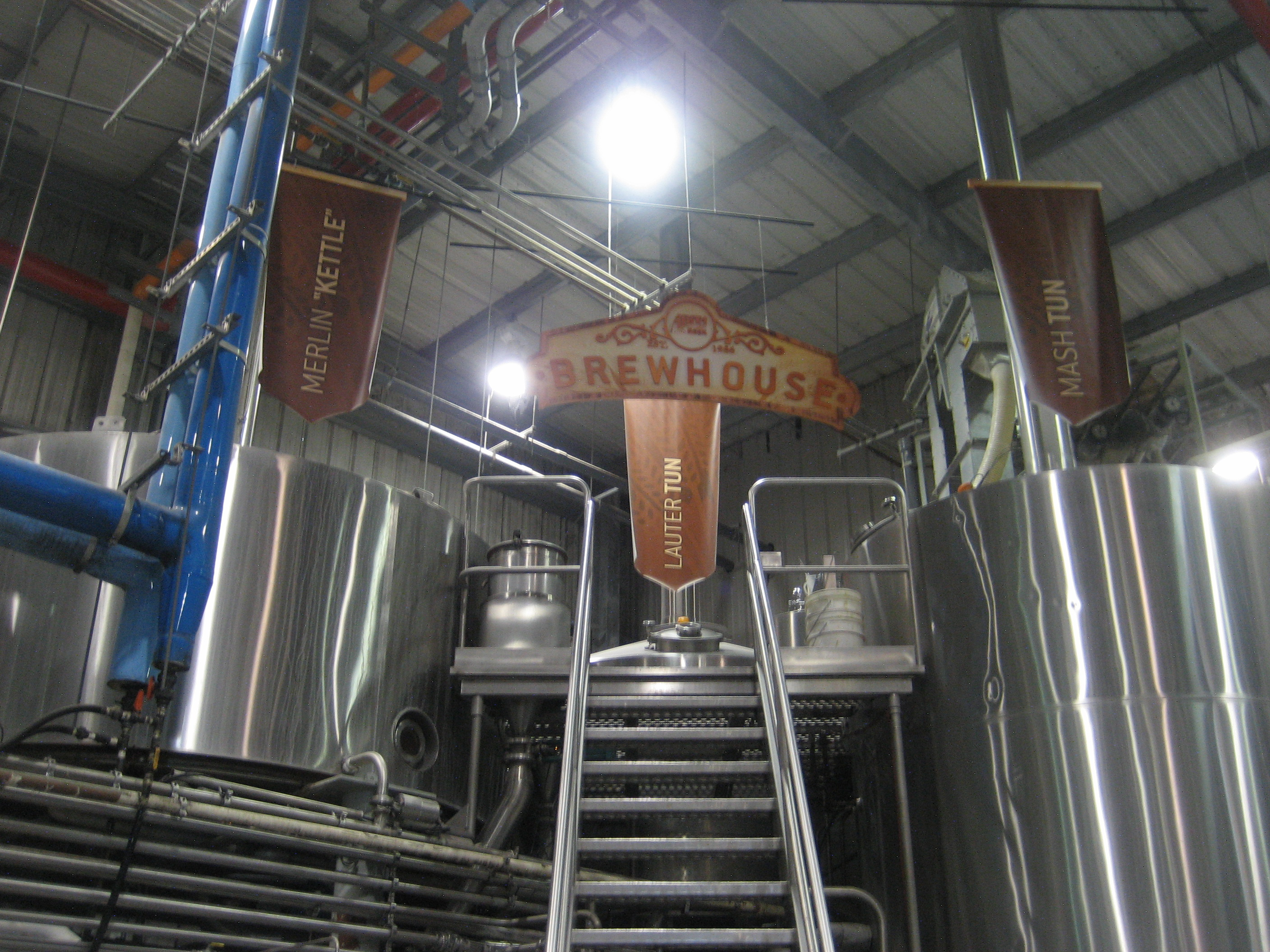
Interior of the brewery

The company brews its beer with water from artesian wells. In August 2005, Stuff Magazine called Abita's Turbodog Ale the best beer made in America. Abita Bock was listed among the Top 10 Spring Beers by Fox News in 2012.

== Production ==
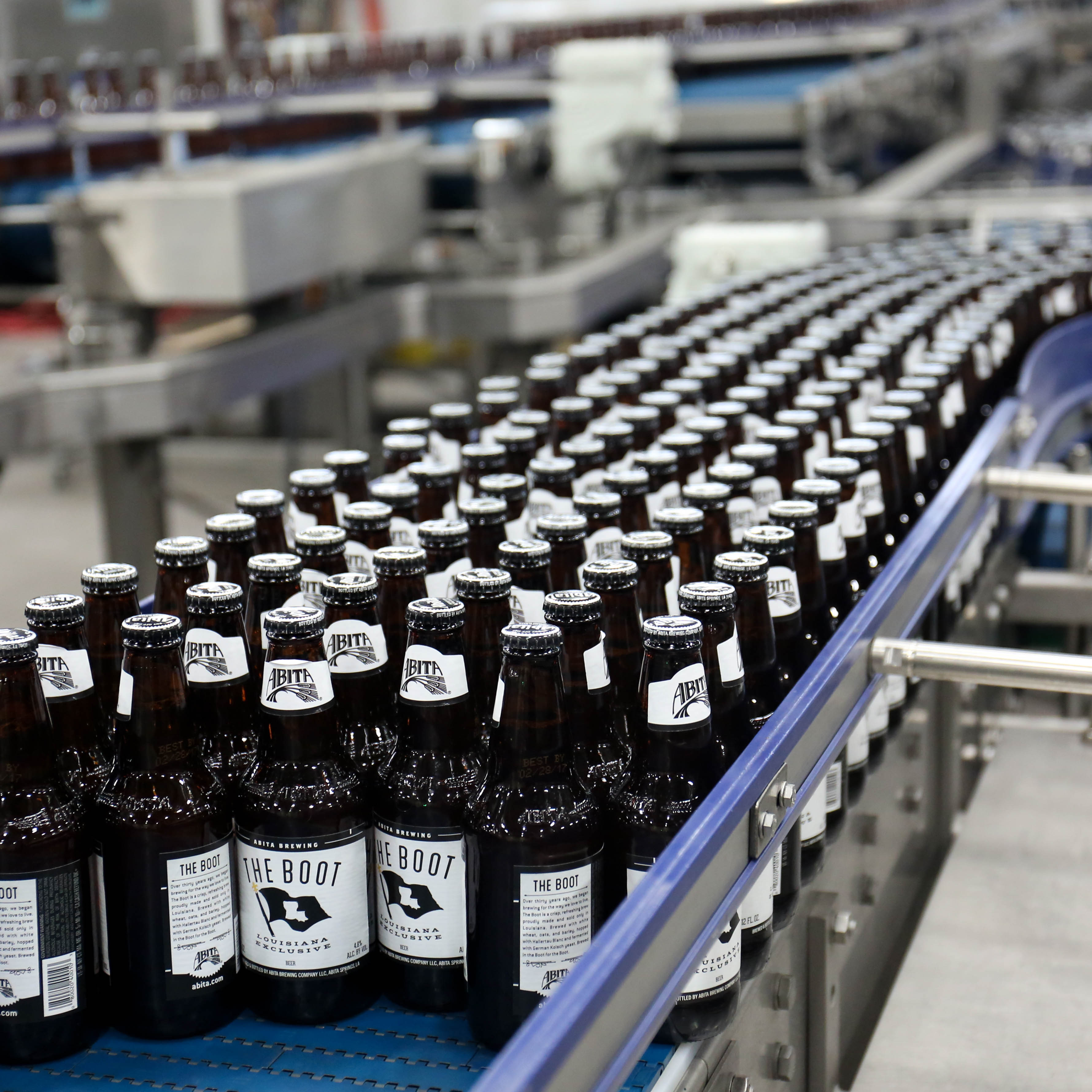
The Boot on the bottling line

In 1986, the company produced 1,500 barrels of beer. In 2011, Abita brewed over 130,000 barrels of beer and 5,000 barrels of root beer. In August 2013, the company announced it would add another 200 barrel brewing system to its existing 100 barrel system, increasing its capacity from 150 bottles per minute to 400 per minute.

The Abita Brewing Company produces a variety of year-round flagship beers including Andy Gator, Strawgator, Abita Amber, Alphagator Golden, Light, Turbodog, Purple Haze, Jockamo I.P.A., and Restoration Pale Ale. It also produces five seasonal beers, three Harvest beers, four Big Beers, a draft-only series, and a root beer.

=== Non-Alcoholic Beverages ===
The company also produces Abita root beer, which is sweetened with Louisiana sugarcane instead of high-fructose corn syrup.

== Distribution ==
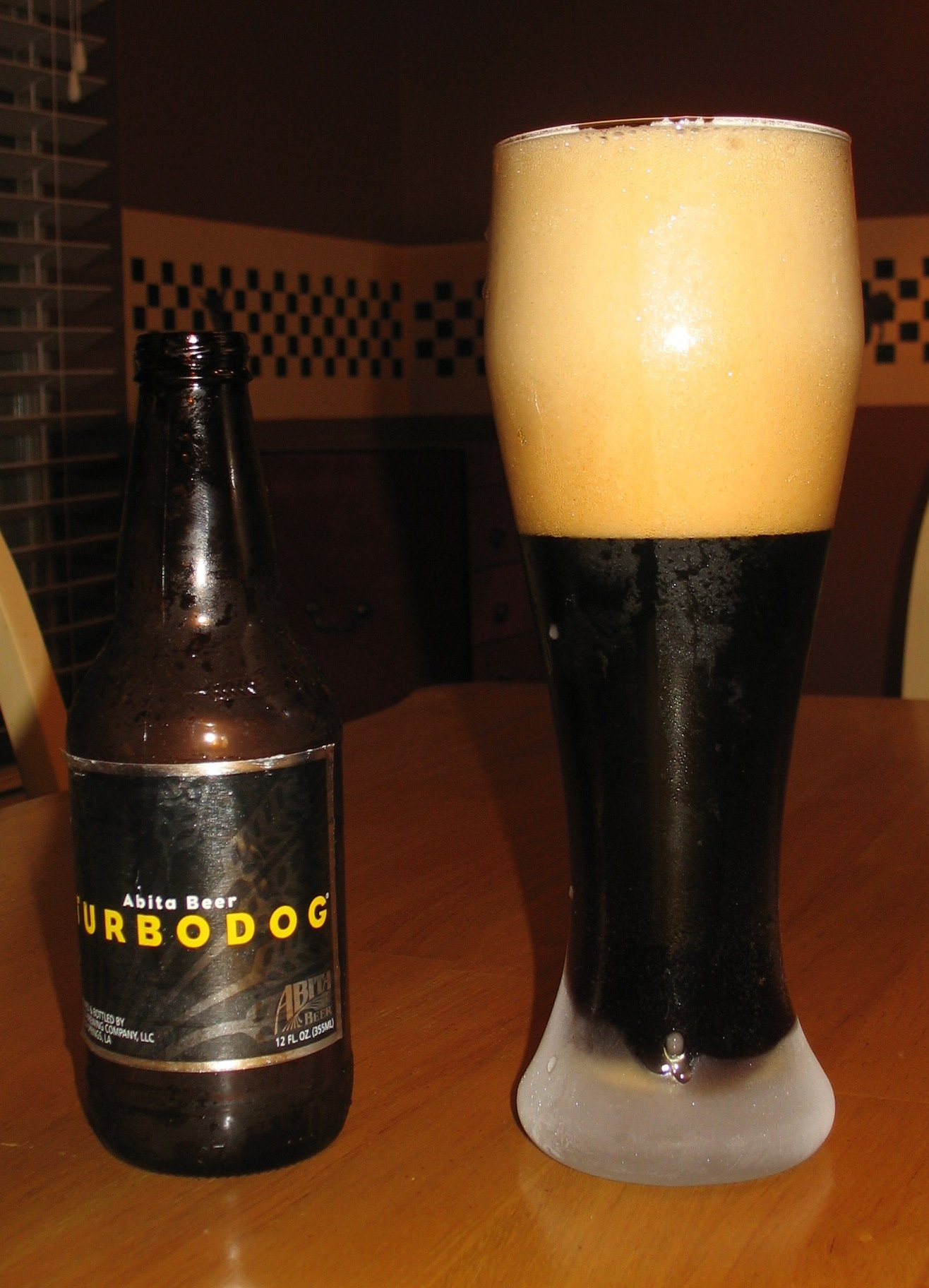
Turbodog, a brown ale, produced by the Abita Brewing Co.

Abita's flagship beers are sold in 46 US states and Puerto Rico. Based on 2010 sales volume, Abita Brewing Company ranked as the 15th largest craft brewery and the 24th largest brewery of any category in the United States.

In February 2012, the company began distributing Amber, Purple Haze, and Jockamo I.P.A. in cans.

== Abita Brew Pub ==
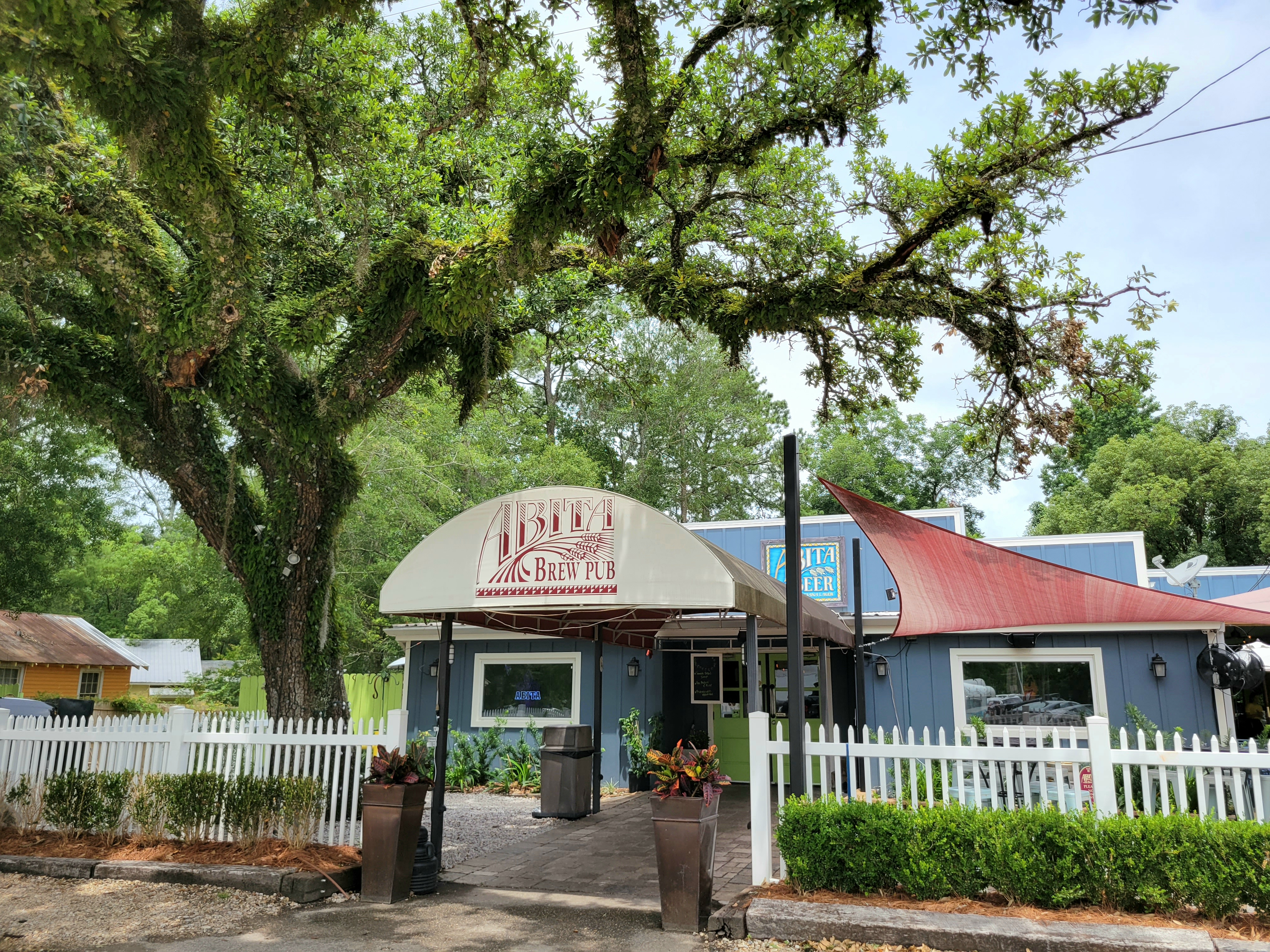
Abita Brew Pub in Abita Springs, Louisiana.

The Abita Brew Pub is independently owned and operates at the original brewery location in Abita Springs. Through a partnership with the brewery, the pub serves Abita beers, including varieties that are exclusive to the location.

== See also ==
- List of breweries in Louisiana
