= Gnarly Barley Brewing Company =

Brewery in Hammond, Louisiana, U.S.

Coordinates: 30.4969727°N 90.4812695°W

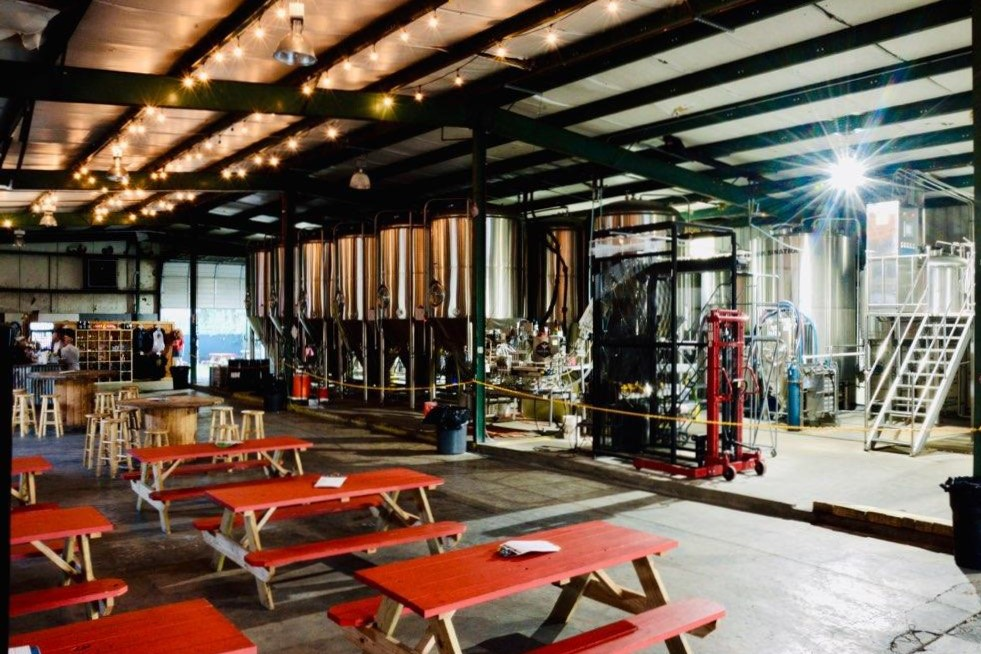
- Industry: Alcoholic beverage
- Founded: 2014
- Headquarters: 1709 Corbin Road, Hammond, Louisiana; United States 70403
- Products: Beer
- Owner: Zac Caramonta, President; Cari Caramonta, Vice-president
- Website: gnarlybeer.com

The Gnarly Barley Brewing Company is a brewery in Hammond, Louisiana. The brewery consists of a brewhouse and an open air taproom named the Gnar Bar.

== History ==
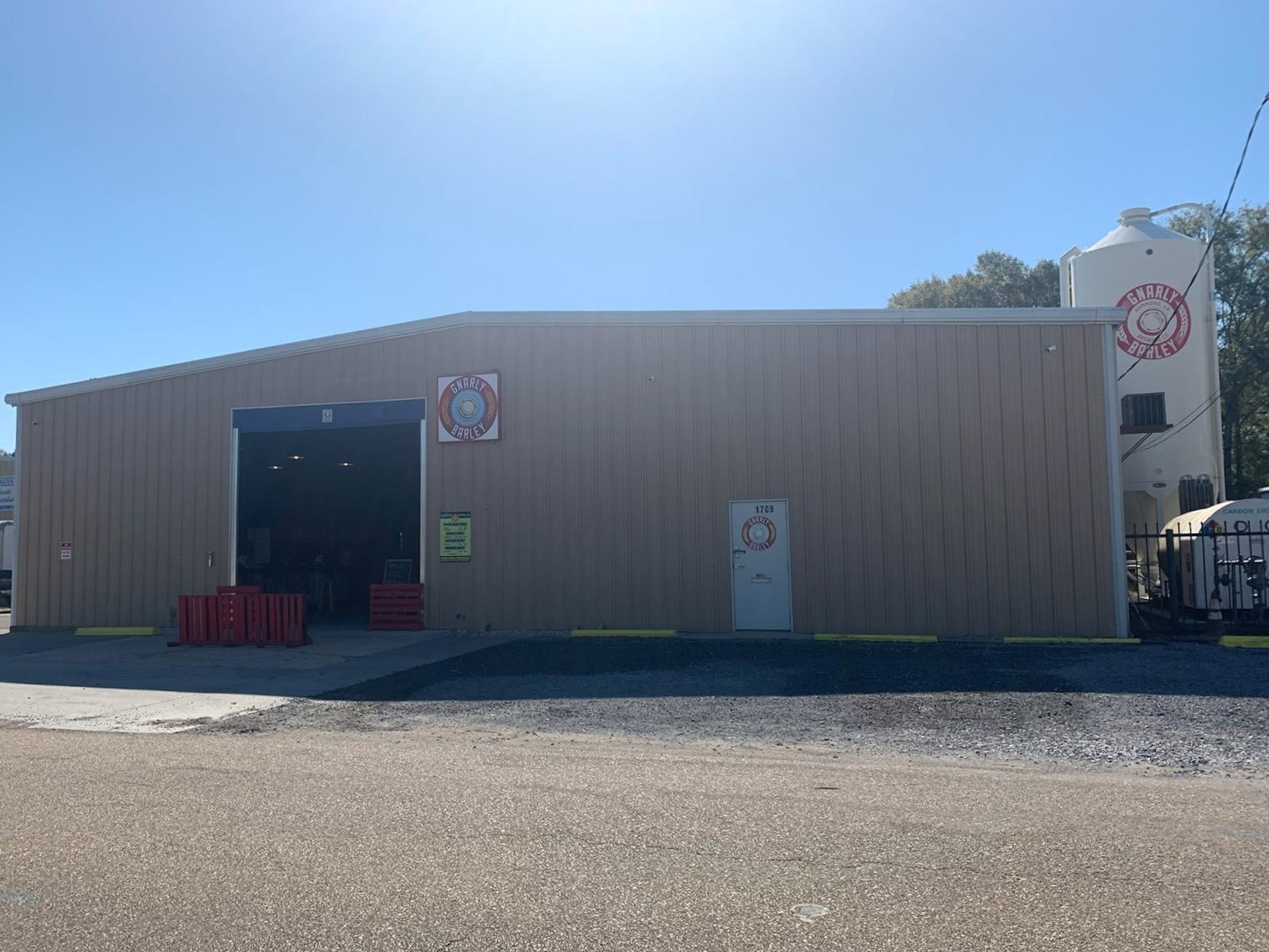
The Brewery

Gnarly Barley's homebrewed beer debuted at the New Orleans on Tap Beer Festival in 2011 with the Korova Milk Porter and Hoppopotamus IPA. In 2014, Gnarley Barley Brewing Company was established with the opening of a 14,000 square foot facility in Hammond, Louisiana. In 2017 and 2018, the Brewers Association named Gnarly Barley among the top 50 fastest growing breweries in the United States.

== Brewing operation and distribution ==
The brewery hosts a two-vessel 30bbl Brewhouse consisting of one hot and one cold liquor tank and a 690bbl cellar.

Current distribution is in southern Louisiana and includes the Greater New Orleans area, the Northshore area of Louisiana, the Greater Baton Rouge area, Lafayette/Acadiana and the Houma/Bayou Parishes region of Louisiana. Distributors for Gnarly Barley are Buquet Distributing, Champagne Beverage, Mockler Beverage Company, Schilling Distributing Company and Southern Eagle Distributing.

== Beers ==
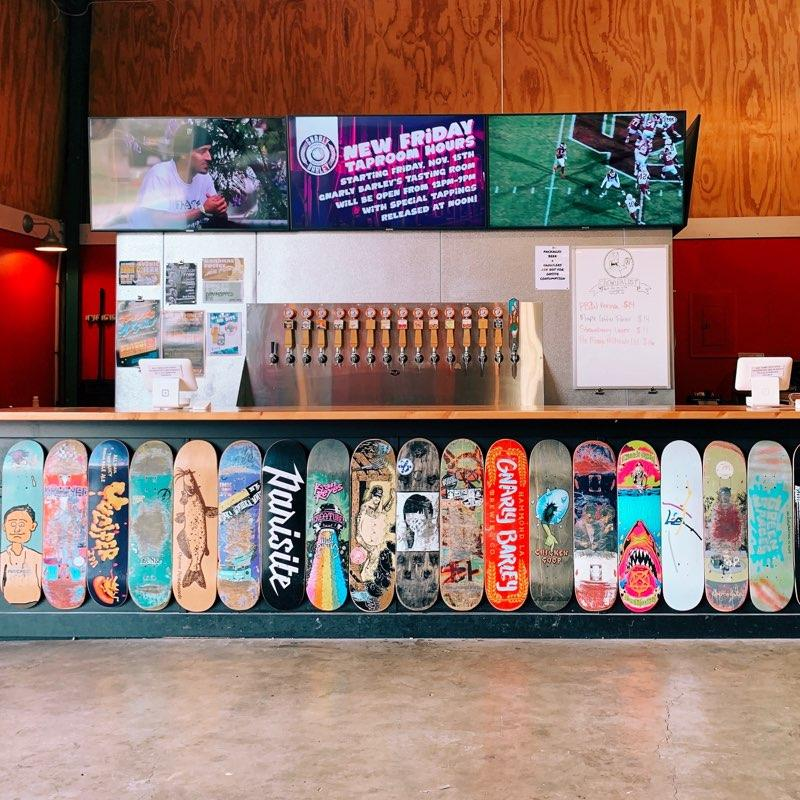
Gnar Bar

Gnarly Barley Brewing produces four year-round flagship beers and nine limited release beers. Gnarley Barley beers are available on draft and in cans.

== See also ==
- List of breweries in Louisiana
- List of microbreweries
