= Faubourg Brewing Company =

Brewery founded in New Orleans, Louisiana

Coordinates: 29.996494°N 90.019051°W

- Formerly: Dixie Brewing Company (1907–2021)
- Industry: Alcoholic beverage
- Founded: 1907
- Founder: Valentine Merz
- Defunct: 2024
- Headquarters: 3501 Jourdan Road, New Orleans, Louisiana, USA
- Products: Beer
- Production output: 1,000,000 cases (pre-Katrina)
- Owner: Gayle Benson (majority owner); Joe and Kendra Bruno (minority owners)
- Website: faubourgbrewery.com

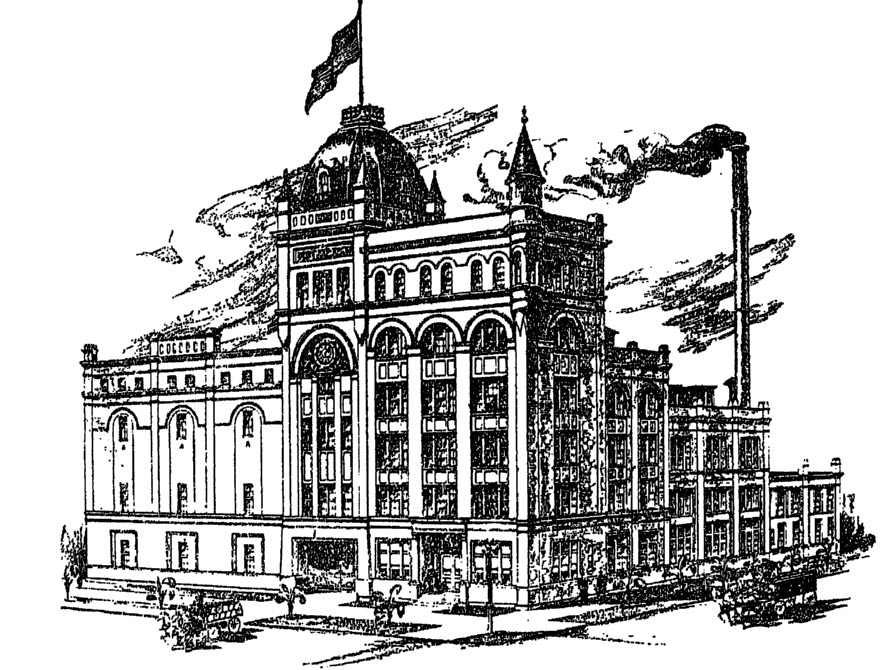
Original Dixie Brewery on Tulane Avenue in 1907, New Orleans

Faubourg Brewing Company was a brewery founded in New Orleans, Louisiana, on October 31, 1907, and originally named Dixie Brewing Company. The brewing operation was located on Tulane Avenue until 2005 when it closed due to damage from Hurricane Katrina. After that the beer was contract brewed out of state until November 2019 when a new brewery opened in New Orleans. In 2021 the brewery was renamed the Faubourg Brewing Company. Following the New Orleans Jazz & Heritage Festival in May 2024, the company announced its closure and that all equipment from their New Orleans plant would be auctioned off.

== History ==
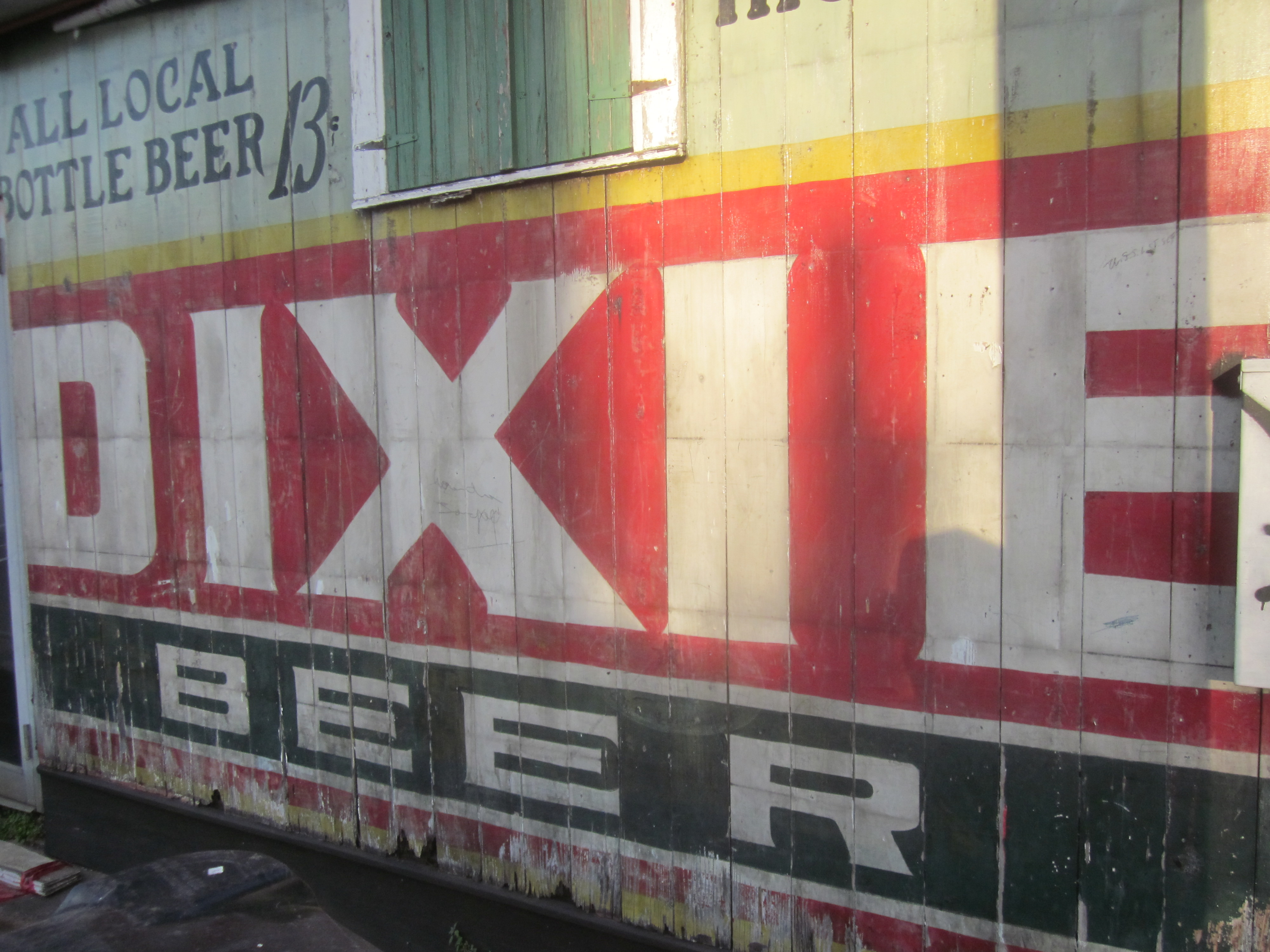
An old Dixie Beer outdoor advertisement, revealed during renovation in New Orleans' Faubourg Marigny neighborhood.

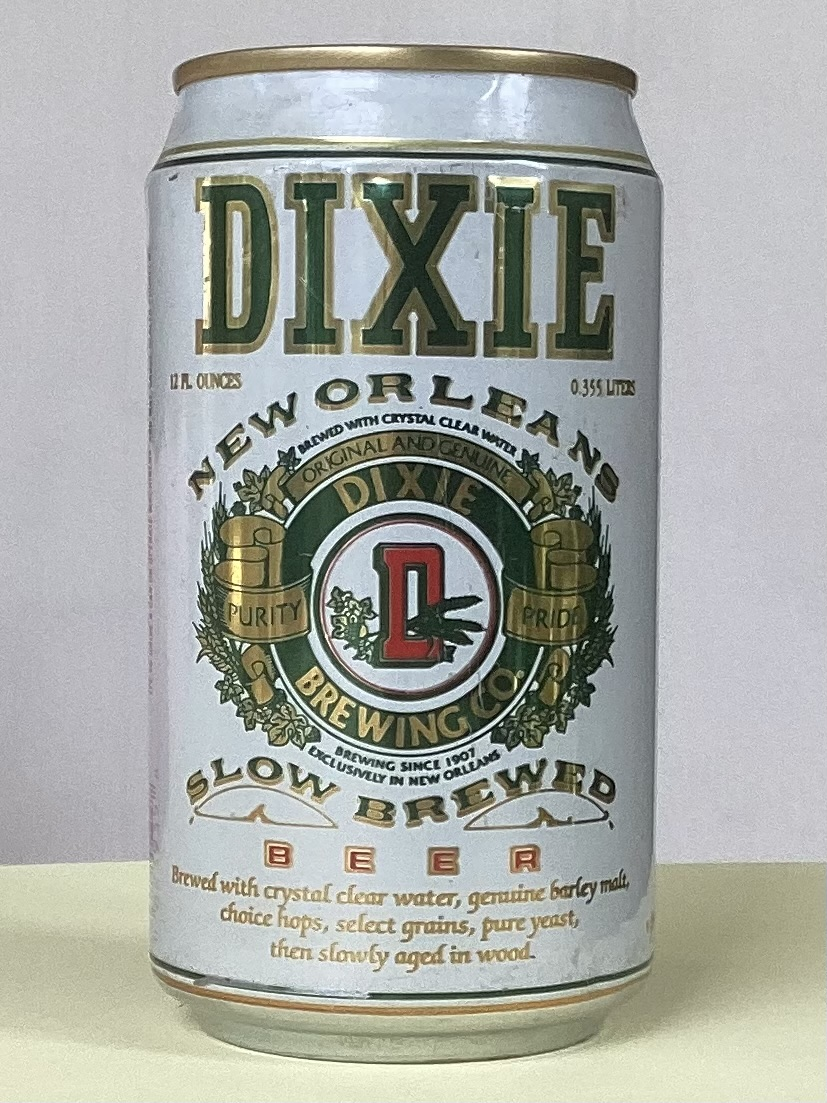
Can of Dixie Beer from about 1973

Faubourg Brewing Company was founded as Dixie Brewing by Valentine Merz, and began production in 1907. The original brick Dixie Brewery building at 2401 Tulane Avenue at the corner of Tulane Avenue and Tonti Street was designed by the German architect Louis Lehle and completed in 1907 with a wooden extension added in 1919. During Prohibition, the company became the "Dixie Beverage Company."

In 1983, Dixie was sold to a New Orleans–based corporation, Coy International. In November 1985, it was purchased by Joseph and Kendra Elliott Bruno and in 1989 its owners filed for Chapter 11 bankruptcy. After emerging reorganized in 1992, the brewery produced a new line of speciality beers, Blackened Voodoo (a dark lager), Crimson Voodoo (a red ale) and in 1993 introduced Jazz Amber Light.

Dixie beer

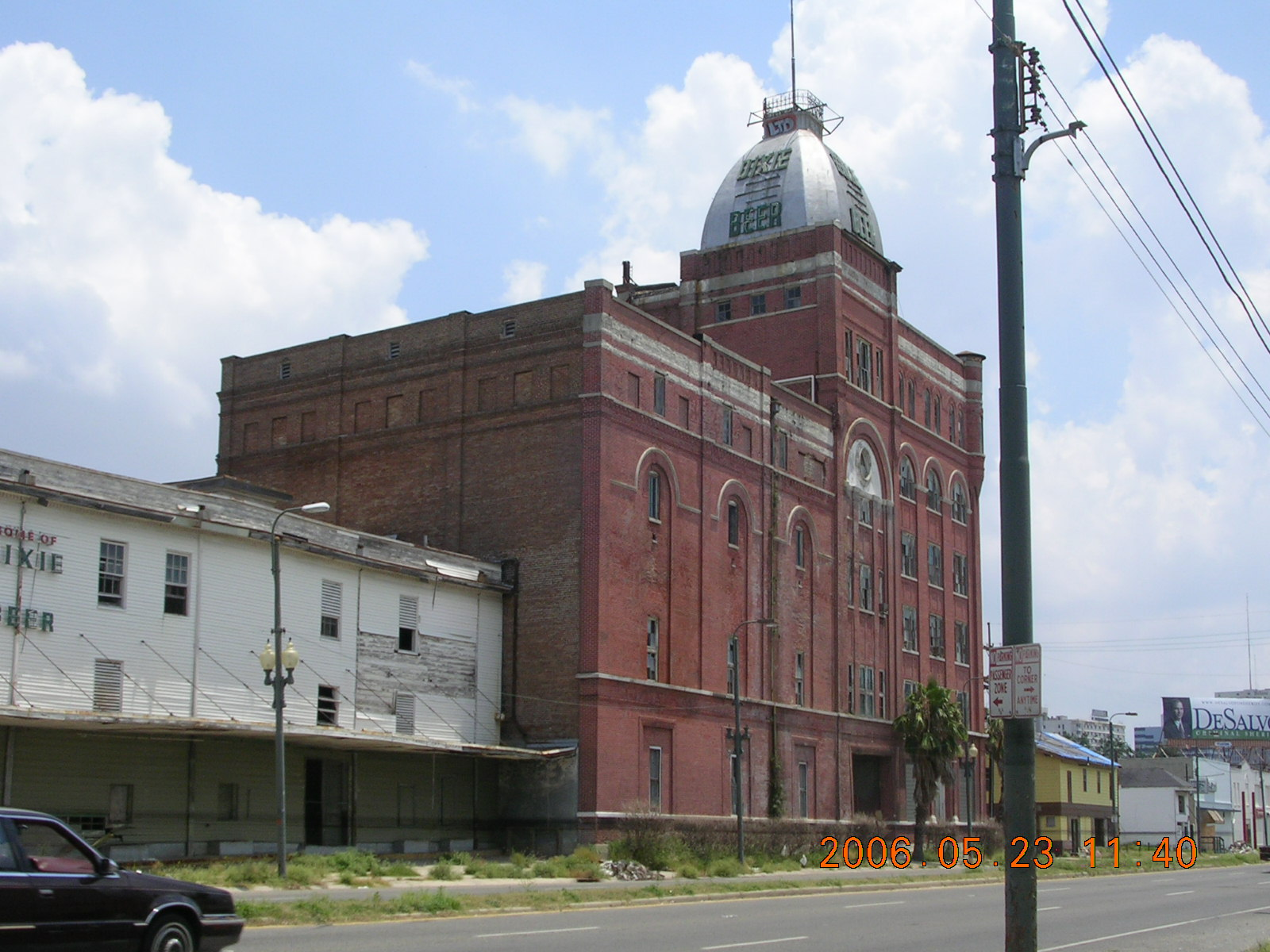
Original Dixie Brewery, 2401 Tulane Avenue; post-Katrina photograph

In 2005, the Dixie Brewery was severely damaged when Mid-City New Orleans flooded from the levee failure disaster during Hurricane Katrina. After the area was drained the brewery complex was looted with much of the equipment stolen. Despite early post-Katrina claims that the brewery would be restored and efforts being made to encourage local government to support the return of the brewery, it was never able to reopen. With the closing of the original brewery, Dixie Beer’s production was contract brewed at Joseph Huber Brewing Company in Monroe, Wisconsin.

When the brewery didn't reopen on Tulane Avenue, the closed brewery building was incorporated into the footprint of the new Department of Veterans Affairs hospital built in New Orleans' Mid-City neighborhood. During restoration, the focus was on stabilizing the structure. Liz Failla, project coordinator for the VA said, "Right now, what we're doing is stabilizing the structure that we're going to maintain, which is that iconic tower with the Dixie Brewery on there." The design preserves and repairs the six- and four-story sections of the old brewery. Failla also said a modern brick and glass structure will rise from behind the historic facade.

Tom Benson, owner of the New Orleans Saints and the New Orleans Pelicans, bought a majority stake in the Dixie brand in 2017 from Joe and Kendra Bruno, with plans of returning the brewing operation to New Orleans within two years. After Tom Benson's death on March 15, 2018, his wife Gayle Benson took control of the majority stake in the brewery.

On August 7, 2018, it was announced a new Dixie Brewery would be built in Eastern New Orleans featuring a replica of the brick tower at Dixie's original brewery and metal letters that were removed from the exterior of the original brewery. The brewery and taproom were built in an 80,000-square-foot portion of an existing warehouse located on a 14-acre property. A private event space above the taproom has a bar made from a vintage fermenting tank also removed from the original brewery. A kitchen off the taproom offers bar snacks and food, while the area just past the on-site beer garden hosts food trucks. The property also includes a beer museum, a grassy meadow with a pond, walking paths, bocce ball courts, fire pits and an area for yard games.

In June 2019, Dixie Beer's production was moved from Monroe, Wisconsin to the Blues City Brewery in Memphis, Tennessee before its return to New Orleans.

On November 25, 2019, the Dixie Brewing Company began brewing at their new brewery in New Orleans, marking the first time Dixie was brewed in New Orleans since 2005. On January 25, 2020, the brewery had its official groundbreaking and the facility opened to the public.

In November 2020 the company announced that it was changing its name from Dixie Brewing Company to Faubourg Brewing Company, with the beer to be branded as Faubourg beer. Faubourg – pronounced "FO-burg" – is a French word that New Orleaneans often use interchangeably with "neighborhood". According to The Times-Picayune, "While the origins of the term Dixie as a nickname for the South reach far back into history, its affiliation with the Confederacy has made it divisive in modern discourse." In February 2021 the signage on the brewery was changed, with final preparations in place for new packaging for the beer.

== Popular culture ==
The brewery and/or its beer have been featured notably in films including Red, Southern Comfort, The Loveless, Steel Magnolias, Stone Cold, Cat People (1982 film), Tigerland, and Tightrope. It is briefly mentioned in the novels A Confederacy of Dunces, American Psycho, Drawing Blood and True Blood.

== See also ==
- List of breweries in Louisiana
