= Aram (given name) =

- Pronunciation: Armenian: [ɑˈɾɑm]; Arabic: [ʔaː.raːm], Persian: [ʔɑː.ˈɾɑːm], Syriac: [ˈʔɑːrɑːm]
- Gender: Masculine

Origin
- Origin: Armenian: Արամ Arabic: آرام Classical Syriac: ܐܪܡ
- Meaning: "High lands" in Aramaic; "Son of the sun" in Armenian

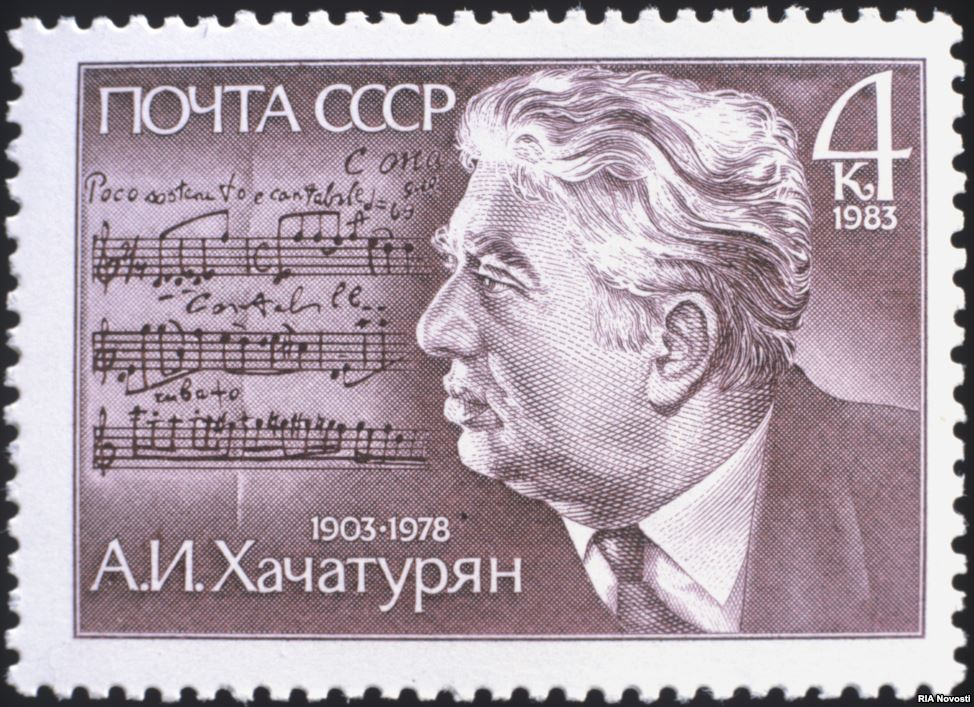
1983 Soviet stamp depicting Aram Khachaturian

Aram (Armenian: Արամ pronounced [ɑˈɾɑm], Imperial Aramaic: אַרָם) is an Armenian patriarch in the History of Armenia, and a masculine name in Aramaic and Armenian. It appears in Hebrew and Aramaic as Aram, son of Shem, and in cuneiform as Arame of Urartu.

The name is most predominantly used by ethnic Armenians. According to Movses Khorenatsi and folk etymology, the name is the source of the exonym Armenia.

People with the name include:

- Aram I (born 1947) birth name Bedros Keshishian, Catholicos, head of the Catholicosate of the Great House of Cilicia (Armenian Apostolic Church), Antelias, Lebanon
- Aram Abbasi (born 1994), Iranian footballer
- Aram Achekbashian (1867–1915), Armenian politician
- Aram Andonian (1875–1952), Armenian journalist, historian and writer
- Aram Arutyunov (born 1956), Russian mathematician
- Aram Asatryan (1953–2006), Armenian pop singer and songwriter
- Aram Avagyan (born 1991), Armenian boxer
- Aram Avakian (1926–1987), American film editor and director
- Aram Ayrapetyan (born 1986), Russian football player
- Aram Shahin Davud Bakoyan (born 1954), Iraqi-Armenian politician
- Aram Bajakian (born 1977), Armenian-American jazz musician
- Aram Bakshian (1944–2022), Armenian-American speech writer and political aide
- Aram Banu Begum (1584–1624), Mughal princess
- Aram Barlezizyan (1936–2022), Armenian academic and linguist
- Aram Bartholl (born 1972), German artist
- Aram Boghossian (born 1929), Brazilian-Armenian freestyle swimmer
- Aram Bounyatyan (born 1839), fourth mayor of Yerevan
- Aram Byer James, American civil rights attorney
- Aram Chobanian (1929–2023), Armenian-American university president
- Aram D'Abro, Armenian American scientific author
- Aram Gharabekyan (1955–2014), Armenian conductor
- Aram Grigorian (born 1998), Russian-Emirati judoka of Armenian ethnicity
- Aram Grigoryan (born 1992), Russian judoka
- Aram Grigoryan (born 1977), Armenian politician from Nagorno-Karabakh
- Aram Haigaz (1900–1986), Armenian-American writer
- Aram Hadzhiyan (born 1979), Armenian cross-country skier
- Aram Hakobyan (born 1979), Soviet born Armenian football player and coach
- Aram Hakobyan (born 2001), Armenian chess grandmaster
- Aram Hamparian (born 1996), American executive director of Armenian National Committee of America
- Aram Han Sifuentes (born 1986), Korean American fiber artist
- Aram Harrow (born 1980), American physicist
- Aram Hasanzada (born 1994), Kurdish-Finnish footballer
- Aram Hur (born 1971), South Korean educator, publisher, lecturer, and social activist
- Aram Karam (1929–2023), Iraqi-Assyrian footballer
- Aram Karamanoukian (1910–1996), Armenian-Syrian army general
- Aram Karapetyan (born 1964), Armenian politician
- Aram Khachaturian (1903–1978), Armenian composer
- Aram Khalili (born 1989), Iranian-Norwegian of Kurdish descent football player
- Aram Kocharyan (1952–2022), Armenian politician
- Aram Mahmoud (born 1997), Syrian-Dutch badminton player
- Aram Manukian (1879–1919), Armenian revolutionary, politician and general
- Aram Manukyan (born 1957), Armenian politician
- Aram Margaryan (born 1974), Armenian freestyle wrestler
- Azam Mirhabibi (born 1953), known as Aram, Iranian actress
- Aram Miskaryan (1973–2009), Armenian sportsman and actor
- Aram Mnatsakanov (born 1962), Azerbaijani Armenian chef and restuarateur
- Aram Nalbandyan (1908–1987), Soviet-Armenian physicist
- Aram Ostadian-Binai (born 1985), Danish-Iranian social entrepreneur
- Aram Pachyan (born 1983), Armenian writer
- Aram J. Pothier (1854–1928), American banker and governor of Rhode Island
- Aram Ramazyan (born 1978), Armenian boxer
- Aram Roston, American investigative journalist
- Aram Safrastyan (1888–1966), Armenian academic
- Aram Sargsyan (born 1961), Armenian Prime Minister
- Aram Avetiki Sargsyan (born 1984), known by his artist name Aram Mp3, Armenian singer and comedian
- Aram Gaspar Sargsyan (born 1949), Armenian politician
- Aram Saroyan (born 1943), Armenian poet, novelist, biographer, memoirist and playwright
- Aram Satian (born 1947), Armenian composer and songwriter
- Aram Shah (1176–1211), second sultan of the Mamluk Sultanate
- Aram Shelton (born 1976), American jazz musician
- Aram Talalyan (born 1971), Armenian cellist and conductor
- Aram Ter-Ghevondyan (1928–1988), Armenian historian
- Aram Tigran (1934–2009), Armenian singer of Kurdish folk music
- Aram Van Ballaert (born 1971), Belgian guitarist and composer
- Aram Vardanyan (born 1995), Uzbek-Armenian wrestler
- Aram Voskanyan (born 1975), Soviet-born Armenian football player
- Aram Yengoyan (1935–2017), professor of anthropology at the University of California, Davis
- Aram Yerganian (1900–1934), Armenian assassin of the Dashnaktsutyun

== See also ==
- Aram (surname)
- Aram (disambiguation)
- Armenian patriarch (disambiguation)
- Arame of Urartu
