= Aram =

Aram may refer to:

== Arts and entertainment ==
- Aram (film), 2002 French action drama
- Aram, a fictional character in Japanese manga series MeruPuri
- Aram Quartet, an Italian music group
- Aram (Kural book), the first of the three books of the Kural literature

== People ==
- Aram (given name), including a list of people with the name
- Aram (surname), including a list of people with the surname
- Aram I (born 1947), catholicos of the Armenian Apostolic Church
- Aram (actress), Iranian film actress Azam Mirhabibi (born 1953)
- Armenak Yaltyryan (1914–1999), Soviet wrestler nicknamed "Aram"
- Aram (intellectual) (1947-1987)

== Biblical or legendary figures ==
- Aram, son of Shem, a biblical figure
- Ram (biblical figure), or Aram in the New Testament
- Aram (Nahapet), a legendary Armenian patriarch

== Places ==
- Aram (region), an ancient region, located in what is now Syria
- Aram, Iran, a village
- Aram, Mazandaran, Iran, a village
- Åram, Norway, a village
- Aram Street, Yerevan, Armenia

== Other uses ==
- Aram, the third day of the month in the Armenian calendar
- ARAM Periodical, an academic journal
- Associate of the Royal Academy of Music
- "All Random, All Mid", a game mode in League of Legends

== See also ==
- Aaram (disambiguation)
- Aramaean (disambiguation)
- Aramaic (disambiguation)
- Eugene Aram (disambiguation)
- Aram's New Ground, a former cricket ground in Walworth, England
- Aram Chaos, an impact crater on Mars
- Aramm, a 2017 Tamil-language film
- Iram of the Pillars, a lost city, region or tribe mentioned in the Quran
