= Torkaman =

Torkaman may refer to:

- Bandar Torkaman, a city in Iran
- Torkaman County, an administrative subdivision of Golestan Province, Iran
- Torkamanchay, a city in East Azerbaijan Province, Iran
- Torkaman, West Azerbaijan, a village in West Azerbaijan Province, Iran
- Torkaman, alternate name of Uzan Torkaman, a village in West Azerbaijan Province, Iran
- Torkaman Rural District, in West Azerbaijan Province, Iran
- Torkaman, alternate name of Hameh Sin, Tehran Province, Iran
- Torkaman (film), a 1974 Iranian film

== See also ==
- Turkmen (disambiguation)
