= Turkmen =

Turkmen, Türkmen, Turkoman, or Turkman may refer to:

== Peoples ==
=== Historical ethnonym ===
- Turkoman (ethnonym), ethnonym used for the Oghuz Turks, and partially Karluk Turks, during the Middle Ages

=== Ethnic groups ===
- Turkmen in Anatolia and the Levant (Seljuk and Ottoman-Turkish descendants):
  - Iraqi Turkmen, a Turkish minority living mostly in the Turkmeneli region in northern Iraq
  - Israeli Turkmen, a Turkish minority living in Israel
  - Lebanese Turkmen, a Turkish minority living in Lebanon
  - Palestinian Turkmen, a Turkish minority living in the region of Palestine
  - Syrian Turkmen, a Turkish minority living mostly in northern Syria
  - Yörüks, a semi-nomadic group in Anatolia often referred to as Turkmen in Turkey
  - Abdal people (West Asia), a semi-nomadic group in Anatolia often referred to as Turkmen in Turkey
  - Anatolian beyliks, small principalities in Anatolia governed by Beys, late 11th–13th centuries
- Turkmens, a Turkic people native to Central Asia living primarily in Turkmenistan and North Caucasus
  - Iranian Turkmens, Turkmen minority living in Iran
  - Afghan Turkmens, Turkmen minority living in Afghanistan
  - Turkmen in Pakistan, mostly Turkmen refugees from Afghanistan and Turkmenistan living in Pakistan
  - Turkmen tribes, the major modern Turkmen tribes that live in Turkmenistan, Iran and Afghanistan

=== Other uses for people ===
- Türkmen (surname), list of people with the surname
- Qarapapaqs or Terekeme, an ethnic minority living in Turkey, Iran and the South Caucasus
- Oghuz Turks, a large branch of Turkic peoples, historically Muslim nomadic Oghuz Turks (in the 10th–18th centuries)

== Languages ==
=== Eastern Oghuz ===
- Turkmen language, the official language of Turkmenistan
  - Turkmen alphabet, used for official purposes in Turkmenistan

=== Western Oghuz ===
- Iraqi Turkmen/Turkman dialects, a Turkish dialect in Iraq
- Syrian Turkmen/Turkman dialects, a Turkish dialect in Syria

== Places ==
=== Afghanistan ===
- Turkman Valley

=== Azerbaijan ===
- Türkmən, Barda
- Türkmən, Goychay
- Türkmən, Qabala

=== Iran ===
- Turkmen Sahra
- Torkamanchay
- Torkaman County
- Central District (Torkaman County)
- Bandar Torkaman
- Torkaman, West Azerbaijan
- Tappeh Torkaman
- Qarah Tappeh, Torkaman

=== Iraq ===
- Turkmeneli

=== Northern Cyprus ===
- Kontea, known in Turkish as Türkmenköy

=== Syria ===
- Turkmen Mountain

=== Turkey ===
- Türkmen, Çüngüş
- Türkmen, Emirdağ
- Türkmen, Gölpazarı
- Türkmen, Keşan
- Türkmen, Vezirköprü
- Türkmenakören, Emirdağ

=== Turkmenistan ===
- Türkmenabat
- Türkmenbaşy, Turkmenistan

== Culture ==
- Music of Turkmenistan
- Turkmen rug, a type of handmade floor-covering originating in Central Asia

=== Media ===
- Türkmen Owazy, a music TV channel in Turkmenistan
- Türkmeneli TV, a bilingual (Arabic and Turkish) TV channel based in Iraq and Turkey

== Other uses ==
- Someone or something related to Turkmenistan

=== Animals ===
- Hybrid camel, sometimes called a Turkoman
- Central Asian Shepherd Dog, known as the Turkmen Alabai
- Turkoman horse, or Turkmene, an extinct breed of horse from Turkmenistan
- Turkmenian kulan, Equus hemionus kulan, a type of wild ass
- Turkoman (horse) (born 1982), an American Thoroughbred racehorse

=== Films ===
- Torkaman (film), a 1974 Iranian film

== See also ==
- Turkestan Autonomous Soviet Socialist Republic
- Turkmen manat, the currency of Turkmenistan
- Turkoman people (disambiguation)
