= Kolu Deh =

Village in Mazandaran province, Iran

Kolu Deh Persian: كلوده
- Village
- Location within Iran
- Coordinates: 36°33′14″N 52°18′19″E
- Country: Iran
- Province: Mazandaran
- County: Mahmudabad
- District: Central
- Rural District: Ahlamerestaq-e Jonubi

Population (2016)
  - Total: 948
- Time zone: UTC+3:30 (IRST)

Kolu Deh (Persian: كلوده) (Note: Also romanized as Kaloodeh and Kolū Deh; also known as Kulede) is a village in, and the capital of, Ahlamerestaq-e Jonubi Rural District (Note: Formerly Ahlamerestaq Rural District) in the Central District of Mahmudabad County, Mazandaran province, Iran.

== Demographics ==
=== Population ===
At the time of the 2006 National Census, the village's population was 1,125 in 297 households. The following census in 2011 counted 1,203 people in 367 households. The 2016 census measured the population of the village as 948 people in 322 households.
