= Mian Kolmarz =

Village in Mazandaran province, Iran

Mian Kolmarz Persian: ميان كلمرز
- Village
- Location within Iran
- Coordinates: 36°37′37″N 52°19′25″E
- Country: Iran
- Province: Mazandaran
- County: Mahmudabad
- District: Central
- Rural District: Harazpey-ye Gharbi

Population (2016)
  - Total: 393
- Time zone: UTC+3:30 (IRST)

Mian Kolmarz (Persian: ميان كلمرز) (Note: Also romanized as Mīān Kolmarz) is a village in Harazpey-ye Gharbi Rural District of the Central District in Mahmudabad County, Mazandaran province, Iran.

== Demographics ==
=== Population ===
At the time of the 2006 National Census, the village's population was 288 in 78 households. The following census in 2011 counted 402 people in 116 households. The 2016 census measured the population of the village as 393 people in 132 households.
