= Harabdeh =

Village in Mazandaran province, Iran

Harabdeh Persian: حرب ده
- Village
- Location within Iran
- Coordinates: 36°37′27″N 52°17′43″E
- Country: Iran
- Province: Mazandaran
- County: Mahmudabad
- District: Central
- Rural District: Harazpey-ye Gharbi

Population (2016)
  - Total: 678
- Time zone: UTC+3:30 (IRST)

Harabdeh (Persian: حرب ده) (Note: Also romanized as Ḩarabdeh) is a village in Harazpey-ye Gharbi Rural District of the Central District in Mahmudabad County, Mazandaran province, Iran.

== Demographics ==
=== Population ===
At the time of the 2006 National Census, the village's population was 618 in 138 households. The following census in 2011 counted 653 people in 173 households. The 2016 census measured the population of the village as 678 people in 211 households.
