= Sharafti =

Village in Mazandaran province, Iran

Sharafti Persian: شرفتي
- Village
- Location within Iran
- Coordinates: 36°34′27″N 52°12′42″E
- Country: Iran
- Province: Mazandaran
- County: Mahmudabad
- District: Central
- Rural District: Ahlamerestaq-e Shomali

Population (2016)
  - Total: 386
- Time zone: UTC+3:30 (IRST)

Sharafti (Persian: شرفتي) (Note: Also romanized as Sharaftī) is a village in Ahlamerestaq-e Shomali Rural District of the Central District in Mahmudabad County, Mazandaran province, Iran.

== Demographics ==
=== Population ===
At the time of the 2006 National Census, the village's population was 420 in 99 households. The following census in 2011 counted 393 people in 111 households. The 2016 census measured the population of the village as 386 people in 124 households.
