= Ahlamerestaq =

Ahlamerestaq (Persian: اهلمرستاق) may refer to:

- Ahlamerestaq-e Jonubi Rural District
- Ahlamerestaq-e Shomali Rural District
