= Telaram, Mahmudabad =

Telaram تلارم
- Village
- Location within Iran
- Coordinates: 36°32′48″N 52°16′48″E
- Country: Iran
- Province: Mazandaran
- County: Mahmudabad
- Bakhsh: Central
- Rural District: Ahlamerestaq-e Jonubi

Population (2016)
  - Total: 401
- Time zone: UTC+3:30 (IRST)

Telaram (Persian: تلارم, also Romanized as Telāram) is a village in Ahlamerestaq-e Jonubi Rural District, in the Central District of Mahmudabad County, Mazandaran Province, Iran.

At the time of the 2006 National Census, the village's population was 467 people. The following census in 2011 counted 442 people in 122 households. The 2016 census measured the population of the village as 401 people in 128 households.
