= Ahlam, Iran =

Village in Mazandaran province, Iran

Ahlam Persian: اهلم
- Village
- Location within Iran
- Coordinates: 36°36′07″N 52°12′59″E
- Country: Iran
- Province: Mazandaran
- County: Mahmudabad
- District: Central
- Rural District: Ahlamerestaq-e Shomali

Population (2016)
  - Total: 1,579
- Time zone: UTC+3:30 (IRST)

Ahlam (Persian: اهلم) is a village in Ahlamerestaq-e Shomali Rural District of the Central District in Mahmudabad County, Mazandaran province, Iran.

In the Middle Ages, Ahlam was a small town that served as the port of Amol. It was called "'Ayn al-Humm" by some medieval authors; Yaqut al-Hamawi wrote the name as "Ahlum".

== Demographics ==
=== Population ===
At the time of the 2006 National Census, the village's population was 1,546 in 419 households. The following census in 2011 counted 1,656 people in 490 households. The 2016 census measured the population of the village as 1,579 people in 527 households.
