= Tashbandan =

Tashbandan تشبندان
- Village
- Location within Iran
- Coordinates: 36°35′44″N 52°17′48″E
- Country: Iran
- Province: Mazandaran
- County: Mahmudabad
- Bakhsh: Central
- Rural District: Ahlamerestaq-e Jonubi

Population (2016)
  - Total: 366
- Time zone: UTC+3:30 (IRST)

Tashbandan (Persian: تشبندان, also Romanized as Tashbandān) is a village in Ahlamerestaq-e Jonubi Rural District, in the Central District of Mahmudabad County, Mazandaran Province, Iran.

At the time of the 2006 National Census, the village's population was 288 in 66 households. The following census in 2011 counted 311 people in 84 households. The 2016 census measured the population of the village as 366 people in 113 households.
