= Naserabad, Mahmudabad =

Naserabad ناصرآباد
- Village
- Location within Iran
- Coordinates: 36°34′04″N 52°19′48″E
- Country: Iran
- Province: Mazandaran
- County: Mahmudabad
- Bakhsh: Central
- Rural District: Ahlamerestaq-e Jonubi

Population (2016)
  - Total: 155
- Time zone: UTC+3:30 (IRST)

Naserabad (Persian: ناصرآباد, also Romanized as Nāşerābād) is a village in Ahlamerestaq-e Jonubi Rural District, in the Central District of Mahmudabad County, Mazandaran Province, Iran.

At the time of the 2006 National Census, the village's population was 196 in 54 households. The following census in 2011 counted 197 people in 61 households. The 2016 census measured the population of the village as 155 people in 55 households.
