= Safrastyan =

Safrastyan (Armenian: Սաֆրաստյան) (alternatively Safrastian (Armenian: Սաֆրաստեան) in Classical Armenian orthography) is an Armenian patronymic surname from the given name Safraz (Armenian: Սաֆրազ), which is ultimately derived from Persian Sarafrāz (Persian: سرافراز; meaning "head held high", "proud").

Notable people with the surname include:

- Aram Safrastyan (1888–1966), Soviet Armenian historian and Turkologist.
- Arshak Safrastian (1885–1958), British-Armenian diplomat and historian.
- Ruben Safrastyan (1955—), Armenian historian and Turkologist.
