= Siahrud Sar =

Village in Mazandaran province, Iran

Siahrud Sar Persian: سياه رودسر
- Village
- Location within Iran
- Coordinates: 36°38′28″N 52°19′16″E
- Country: Iran
- Province: Mazandaran
- County: Mahmudabad
- District: Central
- Rural District: Harazpey-ye Gharbi

Population (2016)
  - Total: 808
- Time zone: UTC+3:30 (IRST)

Siahrud Sar (Persian: سياه رودسر) (Note: Also romanized as Sīāhrūd Sar) is a village in Harazpey-ye Gharbi Rural District of the Central District in Mahmudabad County, Mazandaran province, Iran.

== Demographics ==
=== Population ===
At the time of the 2006 National Census, the village's population was 776 in 199 households. The following census in 2011 counted 797 people in 223 households. The 2016 census measured the population of the village as 808 people in 265 households.
