= Baudeh =

Baudeh (Persian: بائوده) may refer to:

- Baudeh-ye Olya
- Baudeh-ye Sofla
