= Ahangar Kola, Mahmudabad =

Ahangar Kola آهنگركلا
- Village
- Location within Iran
- Coordinates: 36°34′40″N 52°20′44″E
- Country: Iran
- Province: Mazandaran
- County: Mahmudabad
- Bakhsh: Central
- Rural District: Ahlamerestaq-e Jonubi

Population (2016)
  - Total: 248
- Time zone: UTC+3:30 (IRST)

Ahangar Kola (Persian: آهنگركلا, also Romanized as Āhangar Kolā; also known as Āhangarkalā-e Harāzpi) is a village in Ahlamerestaq-e Jonubi Rural District, in the Central District of Mahmudabad County, Mazandaran Province, Iran.

At the time of the 2006 National Census, the village's population was 204 in 45 households. The following census in 2011 counted 216 people in 58 households. The 2016 census measured the population of the village as 248 people in 78 households.
