= Siar Kola =

Village in Mazandaran province, Iran

Siar Kola Persian: سياركلا
- Village
- Location within Iran
- Coordinates: 36°35′33″N 52°16′26″E
- Country: Iran
- Province: Mazandaran
- County: Mahmudabad
- District: Central
- Rural District: Ahlamerestaq-e Jonubi

Population (2016)
  - Total: 817
- Time zone: UTC+3:30 (IRST)

Siar Kola (Persian: سياركلا) (Note: Also romanized as Sīār Kolā) is a village in Ahlamerestaq-e Jonubi Rural District (Note: Formerly Ahlamerestaq Rural District) of the Central District in Mahmudabad County, Mazandaran province, Iran.

== Demographics ==
=== Population ===
At the time of the 2006 National Census, the village's population was 817 in 210 households. The following census in 2011 counted 748 people in 235 households. The 2016 census measured the population of the village as 906 people in 299 households.
