= Aramaic people =

Aramaic people may refer to:

- Ancient Aramaic people, variant term for the ancient Aramean people
- Modern Aramaic people, variant term for modern followers of Syriac Christianity, particularly Assyrians
- Aramaic-speaking peoples, various peoples who speak Aramaic, ancient or modern
- Aramaic-speaking Jewish people, Aramaic-speaking Jewish diasporas

== See also ==
- Aramaic (disambiguation)
- Aramean (disambiguation)
