= Gilapey =

Gilapey گيلاپی
- Village
- Location within Iran
- Coordinates: 36°33′52″N 52°17′02″E
- Country: Iran
- Province: Mazandaran
- County: Mahmudabad
- Bakhsh: Central
- Rural District: Ahlamerestaq-e Jonubi

Population (2016)
  - Total: 474
- Time zone: UTC+3:30 (IRST)

Gilapey (Persian: گيلاپی, also Romanized as Gīlāpey) is a village in Ahlamerestaq-e Jonubi Rural District, in the Central District of Mahmudabad County, Mazandaran Province, Iran.

At the time of the 2006 National Census, the village's population was 520 in 138 households. The following census in 2011 counted 485 people in 146 households. The 2016 census measured the population of the village as 474 people in 163 households.
