= Zangi Kola =

Village in Mazandaran province, Iran

Zangi Kala Persian: زنگی كلا
- Village
- Location within Iran
- Coordinates: 36°34′25″N 52°20′27″E
- Country: Iran
- Province: Mazandaran
- County: Mahmudabad
- District: Central
- Rural District: Ahlamerestaq-e Jonubi

Population (2016)
  - Total: 550
- Time zone: UTC+3:30 (IRST)

Zangi Kala (Persian: زنگی کلا) (Note: Also romanized as Zangi Kalā) is a village in Ahlamerestaq-e Jonubi Rural District (Note: Formerly Ahlamerestaq Rural District) of the Central District in Mahmudabad County, Mazandaran province, Iran.

== Demographics ==
=== Population ===
At the time of the 2006 National Census, the village's population was 557 in 148 households. The following census in 2011 counted 560 people in 177 households. The 2016 census measured the population of the village as 550 people in 186 households.
