= Tej Kenar =

Village in Mazandaran province, Iran

Tej Kenar Persian: تجكنار
- Village
- Location within Iran
- Coordinates: 36°35′41″N 52°13′53″E
- Country: Iran
- Province: Mazandaran
- County: Mahmudabad
- District: Central
- Rural District: Ahlamerestaq-e Shomali

Population (2016)
  - Total: 329
- Time zone: UTC+3:30 (IRST)

Tej Kenar (Persian: تجكنار) (Note: Also romanized as Tajkenār and Tej Kenār; also known as Tachkinār and Tajkinār) is a village in Ahlamerestaq-e Shomali Rural District of the Central District in Mahmudabad County, Mazandaran province, Iran.

== Demographics ==
=== Population ===
At the time of the 2006 National Census, the village's population was 333 in 85 households. The following census in 2011 counted 326 people in 94 households. The 2016 census measured the population of the village as 329 people in 102 households.
