= Khatt-e Ahi =

Village in Mazandaran province, Iran

Khatt-e Ahi Persian: خطاهي
- Village
- Location within Iran
- Coordinates: 36°38′48″N 52°18′37″E
- Country: Iran
- Province: Mazandaran
- County: Mahmudabad
- District: Central
- Rural District: Harazpey-ye Gharbi

Population (2016)
  - Total: 1,620
- Time zone: UTC+3:30 (IRST)

Khatt-e Ahi (Persian: خطاهي) (Note: Also romanized as Khaţţ-e Āhī) is a village in, and the capital of, Harazpey-ye Gharbi Rural District in the Central District of Mahmudabad County, Mazandaran province, Iran.

== Demographics ==
=== Population ===
At the time of the 2006 National Census, the village's population was 733 in 193 households. The following census in 2011 counted 528 people in 155 households. The 2016 census measured the population of the village as 1,620 people in 533 households. It was the most populous village in its rural district.
