= Hasanabad, Mahmudabad =

Hasanabad حسن آباد
- Village
- Location within Iran
- Coordinates: 36°33′30″N 52°19′22″E
- Country: Iran
- Province: Mazandaran
- County: Mahmudabad
- Bakhsh: Central
- Rural District: Ahlamerestaq-e Jonubi

Population (2016)
  - Total: 141
- Time zone: UTC+3:30 (IRST)

Hasanabad (Persian: حسن آباد, also romanized as Ḩasanābād) is a village in Ahlamerestaq-e Jonubi Rural District, in the Central District of Mahmudabad County, Mazandaran Province, Iran.

At the time of the 2006 National Census, the village's population was 173 in 43 households. The following census in 2011 counted 175 people in 51 households. The 2016 census measured the population of the village as 141 people in 49 households.
