= Khesht Sar =

Village in Mazandaran province, Iran

Khesht Sar Persian: خشت سر
- Village
- Location within Iran
- Coordinates: 36°36′48″N 52°11′52″E
- Country: Iran
- Province: Mazandaran
- County: Mahmudabad
- District: Central
- Rural District: Ahlamerestaq-e Shomali

Population (2016)
  - Total: 2,656
- Time zone: UTC+3:30 (IRST)

Khesht Sar (Persian: خشت سر) is a village in Ahlamerestaq-e Shomali Rural District of the Central District in Mahmudabad County, Mazandaran province, Iran.

== Demographics ==
=== Population ===
At the time of the 2006 National Census, the village's population was 2,524 in 701 households. The following census in 2011 counted 2,472 people in 775 households. The 2016 census measured the population of the village as 2,656 people in 905 households, the most populous in its rural district.
