= Ahi Mahalleh =

Village in Mazandaran province, Iran

Ahi Mahalleh Persian: آهی محله
- Village
- Location within Iran
- Coordinates: 36°36′43″N 52°19′41″E
- Country: Iran
- Province: Mazandaran
- County: Mahmudabad
- District: Central
- Rural District: Harazpey-ye Gharbi

Population (2016)
  - Total: 1,204
- Time zone: UTC+3:30 (IRST)

Ahi Mahalleh (Persian: آهی محله) (Note: Also romanized as Āhī Maḩalleh) is a village in Harazpey-ye Gharbi Rural District of the Central District in Mahmudabad County, Mazandaran province, Iran.

== Demographics ==
=== Population ===
At the time of the 2006 National Census, the village's population was 1,281 in 336 households. The following census in 2011 counted 1,292 people in 374 households. The 2016 census measured the population of the village as 1,204 people in 390 households.
