= Ormak Mahalleh =

Village in Mazandaran province, Iran

Ormak Mahalleh Persian: ارمك محله
- Village
- Location within Iran
- Coordinates: 36°36′03″N 52°19′43″E
- Country: Iran
- Province: Mazandaran
- County: Mahmudabad
- District: Central
- Rural District: Harazpey-ye Gharbi

Population (2016)
  - Total: 469
- Time zone: UTC+3:30 (IRST)

Ormak Mahalleh (Persian: ارمك محله) (Note: Also romanized as Ormak Maḩalleh; also known as Ormak Kolā) is a village in Harazpey-ye Gharbi Rural District of the Central District in Mahmudabad County, Mazandaran province, Iran.

== Demographics ==
=== Population ===
At the time of the 2006 National Census, the village's population was 414 in 112 households. The following census in 2011 counted 432 people in 128 households. The 2016 census measured the population of the village as 469 people in 149 households.
