= Galesh Pol =

Village in Mazandaran province, Iran

Galesh Pol Persian: گالش پل
- Village
- Location within Iran
- Coordinates: 36°34′58″N 52°17′06″E
- Country: Iran
- Province: Mazandaran
- County: Mahmudabad
- District: Central
- Rural District: Ahlamerestaq-e Jonubi

Population (2016)
  - Total: 1,368
- Time zone: UTC+3:30 (IRST)

Galesh Pol (Persian: گالش پل) (Note: Also romanized as Gālesh Pol) is a village in Ahlamerestaq-e Jonubi Rural District (Note: Formerly Ahlamerestaq Rural District) of the Central District in Mahmudabad County, Mazandaran province, Iran.

== Demographics ==
=== Population ===
At the time of the 2006 National Census, the village's population was 1,218 in 334 households. The following census in 2011 counted 1,357 people in 422 households. The 2016 census measured the population of the village as 1,368 people in 465 households.
