= Eshqabad, Mazandaran =

Eshqabad عشق آباد
- Village
- Location within Iran
- Coordinates: 36°33′30″N 52°19′44″E
- Country: Iran
- Province: Mazandaran
- County: Mahmudabad
- Bakhsh: Central
- Rural District: Ahlamerestaq-e Jonubi

Population (2016)
  - Total: 264
- Time zone: UTC+3:30 (IRST)

Eshqabad (Persian: عشق آباد, also Romanized as ‘Eshqābād) is a village in Ahlamerestaq-e Jonubi Rural District, in the Central District of Mahmudabad County, Mazandaran Province, Iran.

At the time of the 2006 National Census, the village's population was 331 in 89 households. The following census in 2011 counted 294 people in 93 households. The 2016 census measured the population of the village as 264 people in 97 households.
