= Yusefabad, Mahmudabad =

Village in Mazandaran province, Iran

Yusefabad Persian: يوسف اباد
- Village
- Location within Iran
- Coordinates: 36°35′19″N 52°15′12″E
- Country: Iran
- Province: Mazandaran
- County: Mahmudabad
- District: Central
- Rural District: Ahlamerestaq-e Shomali

Population (2016)
  - Total: 711
- Time zone: UTC+3:30 (IRST)

Yusefabad (Persian: يوسف اباد) (Note: Also romanized as Yūsefābād) is a village in Ahlamerestaq-e Shomali Rural District of the Central District in Mahmudabad County, Mazandaran province, Iran.

== Demographics ==
=== Population ===
At the time of the 2006 National Census, the village's population was 637 in 156 households. The following census in 2011 counted 645 people in 186 households. The 2016 census measured the population of the village as 711 people in 236 households.
