= Azademun =

Village in Mazandaran province, Iran

Azademun Persian: آزادمون
- Village
- Location within Iran
- Coordinates: 36°36′03″N 52°14′28″E
- Country: Iran
- Province: Mazandaran
- County: Mahmudabad
- District: Central
- Rural District: Ahlamerestaq-e Shomali

Population (2016)
  - Total: 2,318
- Time zone: UTC+3:30 (IRST)

Azademun (Persian: آزادمون) (Note: Also romanized as Āzādemūn, Azadmoon, and Āzādmūn) is a village in, and the capital of, Ahlamerestaq-e Shomali Rural District in the Central District of Mahmudabad County, Mazandaran province, Iran.

== Demographics ==
=== Population ===
At the time of the 2006 National Census, the village's population was 2,303 in 607 households. The following census in 2011 counted 2,361 people in 712 households. The 2016 census measured the population of the village as 2,318 people in 774 households.
