= Juni Kola =

Village in Mazandaran province, Iran

Juni Kola Persian: جوني كلا
- Village
- Location within Iran
- Coordinates: 36°34′30″N 52°17′08″E
- Country: Iran
- Province: Mazandaran
- County: Mahmudabad
- District: Central
- Rural District: Ahlamerestaq-e Jonubi

Population (2016)
  - Total: 617
- Time zone: UTC+3:30 (IRST)

Juni Kola (Persian: جوني كلا) (Note: Also romanized as Jūnī Kolā; also known as Jūneh Kolā) is a village in Ahlamerestaq-e Jonubi Rural District (Note: Formerly Ahlamerestaq Rural District) of the Central District in Mahmudabad County, Mazandaran province, Iran.

== Demographics ==
=== Population ===
At the time of the 2006 National Census, the village's population was 582 in 153 households. The following census in 2011 counted 624 people in 190 households. The 2016 census measured the population of the village as 617 people in 202 households.
