= Kahlu Kaj =

Kahlu Kaj كهلوكاج
- Village
- Location within Iran
- Coordinates: 36°33′53″N 52°17′21″E
- Country: Iran
- Province: Mazandaran
- County: Mahmudabad
- Bakhsh: Central
- Rural District: Ahlamerestaq-e Jonubi

Population (2016)
  - Total: 203
- Time zone: UTC+3:30 (IRST)

Kahlu Kaj (Persian: كهلوكاج, also Romanized as Kahlū Kāj; also known as Kahlokāj) is a village in Ahlamerestaq-e Jonubi Rural District, in the Central District of Mahmudabad County, Mazandaran Province, Iran.

At the time of the 2006 National Census, the village's population was 169 in 46 households. The following census in 2011 counted 197 people in 55 households. The 2016 census measured the population of the village as 203 people in 64 households.
