= Eslamabad, Mahmudabad =

Village in Mazandaran province, Iran

Eslamabad Persian: اسلام آباد
- Village
- Location within Iran
- Country: Iran
- Province: Mazandaran
- County: Mahmudabad
- District: Central
- Rural District: Ahlamerestaq-e Jonubi

Population (2016)
  - Total: 665
- Time zone: UTC+3:30 (IRST)

Eslamabad (Persian: اسلام آباد) (Note: Also romanized as Eslāmābād) is a village in Ahlamerestaq-e Jonubi Rural District (Note: Formerly Ahlamerestaq Rural District) of the Central District in Mahmudabad County, Mazandaran province, Iran.

== Demographics ==
=== Population ===
At the time of the 2006 National Census, the village's population was 744 in 192 households. The following census in 2011 counted 752 people in 224 households. The 2016 census measured the population of the village as 665 people in 215 households.
