= Bundeh =

Village in Mazandaran province, Iran

Bundeh Persian: بونده
- Village
- Location within Iran
- Coordinates: 36°34′17″N 52°14′12″E
- Country: Iran
- Province: Mazandaran
- County: Mahmudabad
- District: Central
- Rural District: Ahlamerestaq-e Shomali

Population (2016)
  - Total: 564
- Time zone: UTC+3:30 (IRST)

Bundeh (Persian: بونده) (Note: Also romanized as Būndeh; also known as Būndeh-e Bālā) is a village in Ahlamerestaq-e Shomali Rural District of the Central District in Mahmudabad County, Mazandaran province, Iran.

== Demographics ==
=== Population ===
At the time of the 2006 National Census, the village's population was 544 in 133 households. The following census in 2011 counted 605 people in 173 households. The 2016 census measured the population of the village as 564 people in 191 households.
