= Qassab Koti =

Village in Mazandaran province, Iran

Qassab Koti Persian: قصاب كتي
- Village
- Location within Iran
- Coordinates: 36°32′58″N 52°18′00″E
- Country: Iran
- Province: Mazandaran
- County: Mahmudabad
- District: Central
- Rural District: Ahlamerestaq-e Jonubi

Population (2016)
  - Total: 678
- Time zone: UTC+3:30 (IRST)

Qassab Koti (Persian: قصاب كتي) (Note: Also romanized as Qaşşāb Kotī) is a village in Ahlamerestaq-e Jonubi Rural District (Note: Formerly Ahlamerestaq Rural District) of the Central District in Mahmudabad County, Mazandaran province, Iran.

== Demographics ==
=== Population ===
At the time of the 2006 National Census, the village's population was 725 in 169 households. The following census in 2011 counted 795 people in 230 households. The 2016 census measured the population of the village as 678 people in 233 households.
