= Tarsiab =

Village in Mazandaran province, Iran

Tarsiab Persian: ترسياب
- Village
- Location within Iran
- Coordinates: 36°35′38″N 52°16′51″E
- Country: Iran
- Province: Mazandaran
- County: Mahmudabad
- District: Central
- Rural District: Ahlamerestaq-e Jonubi

Population (2016)
  - Total: 1,773
- Time zone: UTC+3:30 (IRST)

Tarsiab (Persian: ترسياب) (Note: Also romanized as Tarsīāb) is a village in Ahlamerestaq-e Jonubi Rural District (Note: Formerly Ahlamerestaq Rural District) of the Central District in Mahmudabad County, Mazandaran province, Iran.

== Demographics ==
=== Population ===
At the time of the 2006 National Census, the village's population was 1,190 in 306 households. The following census in 2011 counted 1,707 people in 492 households. The 2016 census measured the population of the village as 1,773 people in 551 households, the most populous in its rural district.
