= Shurestaq =

Village in Mazandaran province, Iran

Shurestaq Persian: شورستاق
- Village
- Location within Iran
- Coordinates: 36°33′28″N 52°12′55″E
- Country: Iran
- Province: Mazandaran
- County: Mahmudabad
- District: Central
- Rural District: Ahlamerestaq-e Shomali

Population (2016)
  - Total: 117
- Time zone: UTC+3:30 (IRST)

Shurestaq (Persian: شورستاق) (Note: Also romanized as Shūrestāq) is a village in Ahlamerestaq-e Shomali Rural District of the Central District in Mahmudabad County, Mazandaran province, Iran.

== Demographics ==
=== Population ===
At the time of the 2006 National Census, the village's population was 87 in 19 households. The following census in 2011 counted 104 people in 28 households. The 2016 census measured the population of the village as 117 people in 35 households.
