= Aramaic history =

Aramaic history may refer to:

- History of the Aramaic language, general history of the Aramaic language and its variants
  - History of the Old Aramaic languages, specific history of the Old Aramaic languages
  - History of the Neo-Aramaic languages, specific history of modern Neo-Aramaic languages
- History of the Aramaic people, variant term for the history of the ancient Aramean people

== See also ==
- Aramaic (disambiguation)
- Aramean (disambiguation)
