= Yamchi, Mazandaran =

Village in Mazandaran province, Iran

Yamchi Persian: يم چي
- Village
- Location within Iran
- Coordinates: 36°38′12″N 52°19′02″E
- Country: Iran
- Province: Mazandaran
- County: Mahmudabad
- District: Central
- Rural District: Harazpey-ye Gharbi

Population (2016)
  - Total: 273
- Time zone: UTC+3:30 (IRST)

Yamchi (Persian: يم چي) (Note: Also romanized as Yamchī) is a village in Harazpey-ye Gharbi Rural District of the Central District in Mahmudabad County, Mazandaran province, Iran.

== Demographics ==
=== Population ===
At the time of the 2006 National Census, the village's population was 269 in 74 households. The following census in 2011 counted 264 people in 76 households. The 2016 census measured the population of the village as 273 people in 89 households.
