= Jura Kola =

Village in Mazandaran province, Iran

Jura Kola Persian: جوراكلا
- Village
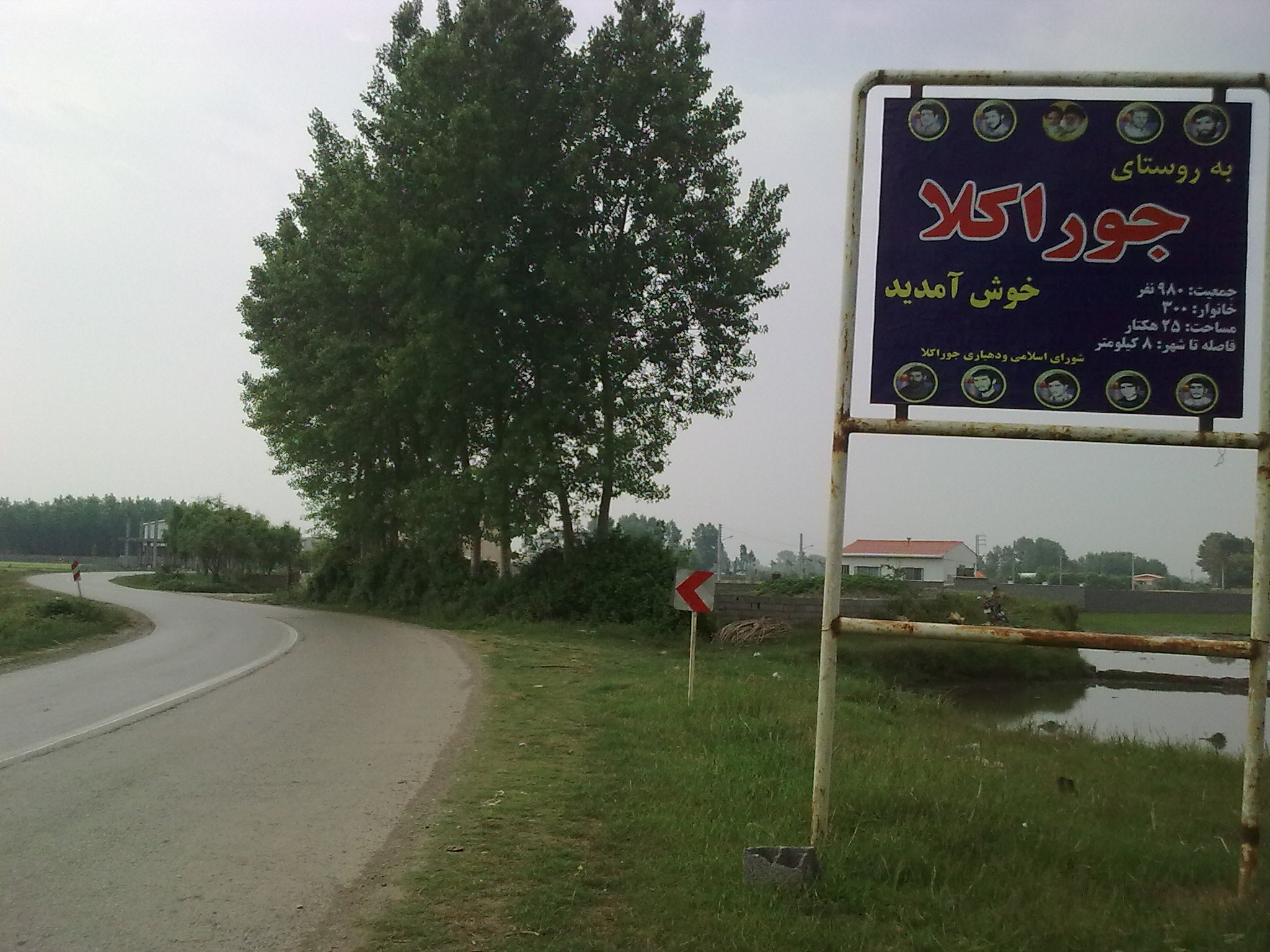

- Location within Iran
- Country: Iran
- Province: Mazandaran
- County: Mahmudabad
- District: Central
- Rural District: Harazpey-ye Gharbi

Population (2016)
  - Total: 997
- Time zone: UTC+3:30 (IRST)

Jura Kola (Persian: جوراكلا) (Note: Also romanized as Jūrā Kolā) is a village in Harazpey-ye Gharbi Rural District of the Central District in Mahmudabad County, Mazandaran province, Iran.

== Demographics ==
=== Population ===
At the time of the 2006 National Census, the village's population was 959 in 245 households. The following census in 2011 counted 953 people in 280 households. The 2016 census measured the population of the village as 997 people in 317 households.
