= Mateverij =

Village in Mazandaran province, Iran

Mateverij Persian: متوريج
- Village
- Location within Iran
- Coordinates: 36°37′36″N 52°18′58″E
- Country: Iran
- Province: Mazandaran
- County: Mahmudabad
- District: Central
- Rural District: Harazpey-ye Gharbi

Population (2016)
  - Total: 642
- Time zone: UTC+3:30 (IRST)

Mateverij (Persian: متوريج) (Note: Also romanized as Mateverīj) is a village in Harazpey-ye Gharbi Rural District of the Central District in Mahmudabad County, Mazandaran province, Iran.

== Demographics ==
=== Population ===
At the time of the 2006 National Census, the village's population was 572 in 145 households. The following census in 2011 counted 614 people in 183 households. The 2016 census measured the population of the village as 642 people in 228 households.
