= Borjandeh =

Village in Mazandaran province, Iran

Borjandeh Persian: برجنده
- Village
- Location within Iran
- Coordinates: 36°33′54″N 52°11′50″E
- Country: Iran
- Province: Mazandaran
- County: Mahmudabad
- District: Central
- Rural District: Ahlamerestaq-e Shomali

Population (2016)
  - Total: 1,686
- Time zone: UTC+3:30 (IRST)

Borjandeh (Persian: برجنده) (Note: Also known as Bīrjandeh) is a village in Ahlamerestaq-e Shomali Rural District of the Central District in Mahmudabad County, Mazandaran province, Iran.

== Demographics ==
=== Population ===
At the time of the 2006 National Census, the village's population was 1,491 in 362 households. The following census in 2011 counted 1,659 people in 471 households. The 2016 census measured the population of the village as 1,686 people in 545 households.
