= Bulideh =

Bulideh بوليده
- Village
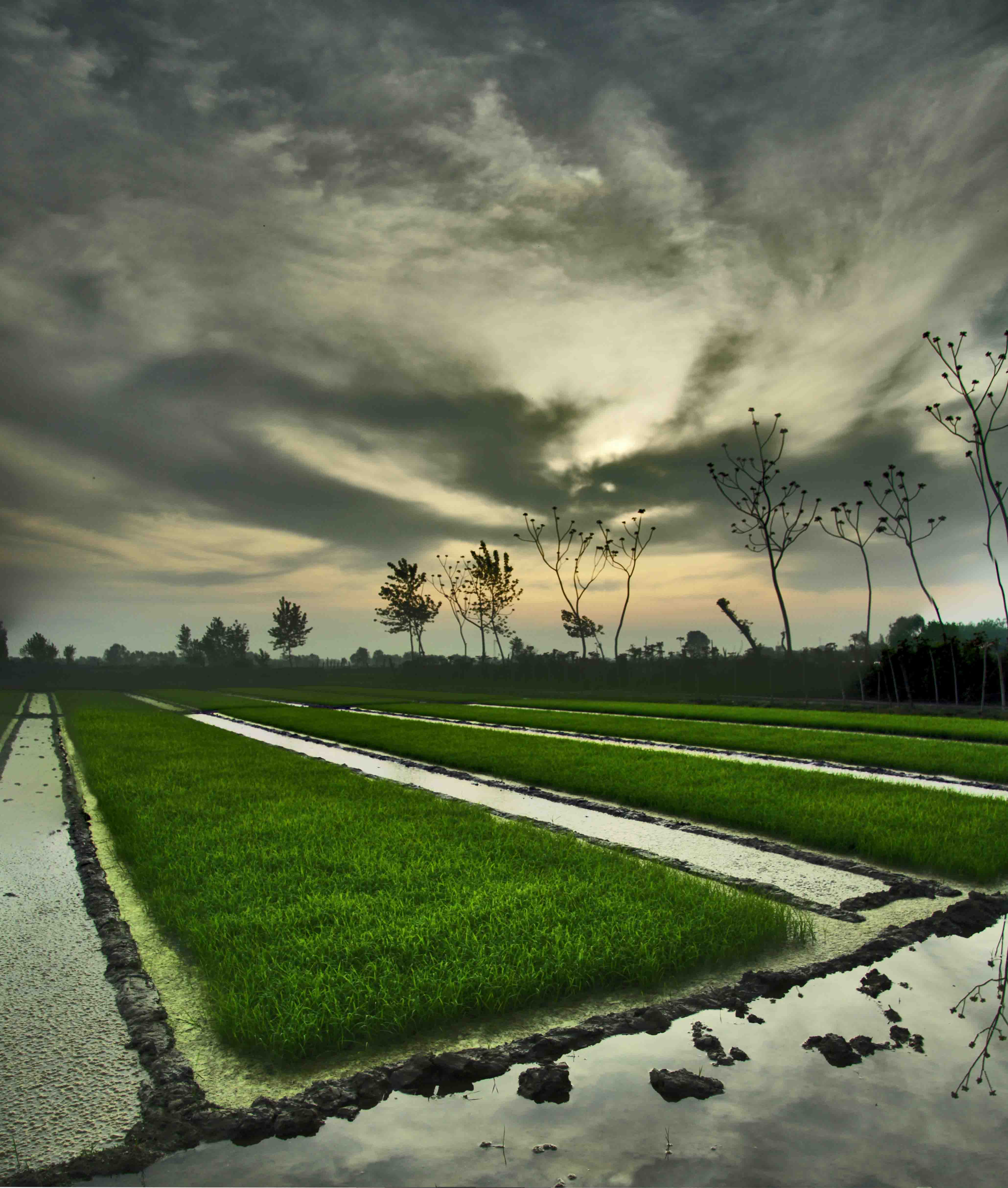
- Paddy fields in Mahmmoud Abad

- Location within Iran
- Coordinates: 36°31′42″N 52°18′25″E
- Country: Iran
- Province: Mazandaran
- County: Mahmudabad
- Bakhsh: Central
- Rural District: Ahlamerestaq-e Jonubi

Population (2016)
  - Total: 348
- Time zone: UTC+3:30 (IRST)

Bulideh (Persian: بوليده, also Romanized as Būlīdeh) is a village in Ahlamerestaq-e Jonubi Rural District, in the Central District of Mahmudabad County, Mazandaran Province, Iran.

At the time of the 2006 National Census, the village's population was 286 in 63 households. The following census in 2011 counted 311 people in 85 households. The 2016 census measured the population of the village as 348 people in 117 households.
