= Khvordun Kola =

Village in Mazandaran province, Iran

Khvordun Kola Persian: خوردونكلا
- Village
- Location within Iran
- Coordinates: 36°34′14″N 52°16′33″E
- Country: Iran
- Province: Mazandaran
- County: Mahmudabad
- District: Central
- Rural District: Ahlamerestaq-e Jonubi

Population (2016)
  - Total: 677
- Time zone: UTC+3:30 (IRST)

Khvordun Kola (Persian: خوردونكلا) (Note: Also romanized as Khowrdūn Kolā and Khvordūn Kolā) is a village in Ahlamerestaq-e Jonubi Rural District (Note: Formerly Ahlamerestaq Rural District) of the Central District in Mahmudabad County, Mazandaran province, Iran.

== Demographics ==
=== Population ===
At the time of the 2006 National Census, the village's population was 649 in 171 households. The following census in 2011 counted 559 people in 170 households. The 2016 census measured the population of the village as 677 people in 235 households.
