= Mir Alamdeh =

Village in Mazandaran province, Iran

Mir Alamdeh Persian: ميرعلمده
- Village
- Location within Iran
- Coordinates: 36°33′07″N 52°17′37″E
- Country: Iran
- Province: Mazandaran
- County: Mahmudabad
- District: Central
- Rural District: Ahlamerestaq-e Jonubi

Population (2016)
  - Total: 595
- Time zone: UTC+3:30 (IRST)

Mir Alamdeh (Persian: ميرعلمده) (Note: Also romanized as Mīr ‘Alamdeh and Mīr Alamdeh) is a village in Ahlamerestaq-e Jonubi Rural District (Note: Formerly Ahlamerestaq Rural District) of the Central District in Mahmudabad County, Mazandaran province, Iran.

== Demographics ==
=== Population ===
At the time of the 2006 National Census, the village's population was 611 in 152 households. The following census in 2011 counted 659 people in 197 households. The 2016 census measured the population of the village as 595 people in 215 households.
