= Sang-e Koti =

Sang-e Koti or Sang Koti (Persian: سنگ كتي) may refer to:

- Sang-e Koti, Mahmudabad
- Sang Koti, Qaem Shahr
