= Karchak =

Karchak (Persian: كرچك) may refer to:

- Karchak-e Larijani
- Karchak-e Navai
