= Baudeh-ye Sofla =

Village in Mazandaran province, Iran

Baudeh-ye Sofla Persian: بائوده سفلي
- Village
- Location within Iran
- Coordinates: 36°34′56″N 52°20′52″E
- Country: Iran
- Province: Mazandaran
- County: Mahmudabad
- District: Central
- Rural District: Ahlamerestaq-e Jonubi

Population (2016)
  - Total: 509
- Time zone: UTC+3:30 (IRST)

Baudeh-ye Sofla (Persian: بائوده سفلي) (Note: Also romanized as Bā’ūdeh-ye Soflá; also known as Bā’ūdeh) is a village in Ahlamerestaq-e Jonubi Rural District (Note: Formerly Ahlamerestaq Rural District) of the Central District in Mahmudabad County, Mazandaran province, Iran.

== Demographics ==
=== Population ===
At the time of the 2006 National Census, the village's population was 517 in 137 households. The following census in 2011 counted 520 people in 156 households. The 2016 census measured the population of the village as 509 people in 163 households.
