= Karchak-e Navai =

Karchak-e Navai کرچک نوایی
- Village
- Location within Iran
- Coordinates: 36°32′50″N 52°19′14″E
- Country: Iran
- Province: Mazandaran
- County: Mahmudabad
- Bakhsh: Central
- Rural District: Ahlamerestaq-e Jonubi

Population (2016)
  - Total: 236
- Time zone: UTC+3:30 (IRST)

Karchak-e Navai (Persian: کرچک نوایی, also Romanized as Karchak-e Navā’ī) is a village in Ahlamerestaq-e Jonubi Rural District, in the Central District of Mahmudabad County, Mazandaran Province, Iran.

At the time of the 2006 National Census, the village's population was 242 in 60 households. The following census in 2011 counted 251 people in 75 households. The 2016 census measured the population of the village as 236 people in 80 households.
