= Sang-e Koti, Mahmudabad =

Sang-e Koti سنگ کتی
- Village
- Location within Iran
- Coordinates: 36°32′39″N 52°19′53″E
- Country: Iran
- Province: Mazandaran
- County: Mahmudabad
- Bakhsh: Central
- Rural District: Ahlamerestaq-e Jonubi

Population (2016)
  - Total: 304
- Time zone: UTC+3:30 (IRST)

Sang-e Koti (Persian: سنگ کتی, also Romanized as Sang-e Kotī) is a village in Ahlamerestaq-e Jonubi Rural District, in the Central District of Mahmudabad County, Mazandaran Province, Iran.

At the time of the 2006 National Census, the village's population was 310 in 79 households. The following census in 2011 counted 298 people in 89 households. The 2016 census measured the population of the village as 304 people in 103 households.
