= Eram, Mahmudabad =

Village in Mazandaran province, Iran

Eram Persian: ارم
- Village
- Location within Iran
- Coordinates: 36°36′20″N 52°20′03″E
- Country: Iran
- Province: Mazandaran
- County: Mahmudabad
- District: Central
- Rural District: Harazpey-ye Gharbi

Population (2016)
  - Total: 942
- Time zone: UTC+3:30 (IRST)

Eram (Persian: ارم) (Note: Also romanized as Āram, also known as Arm; Mazandarani: آرم) is a village in Harazpey-ye Gharbi Rural District of the Central District in Mahmudabad County, Mazandaran province, Iran.

== Demographics ==
=== Population ===
At the time of the 2006 National Census, the village's population was 892 in 239 households. The following census in 2011 counted 971 people in 304 households. The 2016 census measured the population of the village as 942 people in 312 households.
