= Sarajuq =

Sarajuq ساراجوق
- Village
- Location within Iran
- Coordinates: 37°29′47″N 45°11′39″E
- Country: Iran
- Province: West Azerbaijan
- County: Urmia
- Bakhsh: Central
- Rural District: Torkaman

Population (2006)
  - Total: 125
- Time zone: UTC+3:30 (IRST)
  - Summer (DST): UTC+4:30 (IRDT)

Sarajuq (Persian: ساراجوق, romanized: Sārājūq; Syriac: Sārījūq) (Note: Also known as Saridjoukh.) is a village in Torkaman Rural District, in the Central District of Urmia County, West Azerbaijan Province, Iran. At the 2006 census, its population was 125, in 30 families.

== History ==
Sārījūq was inhabited by 20 Church of the East Christian families with no priest or church in 1862, according to the Russian archimandrite Sophoniah. There were 10 Church of the East Christian families at Sārījūq with 1 church but no priest in 1877, as per Edward Lewes Cutts. Prior to the First World War, there were 20 Assyrian houses at Sārījūq, as per the list presented by Agha Petros to the Lausanne Peace Conference in 1922. It was located in the Baranduz district.

== Bibliography ==
- Gaunt, David (2006). Massacres, Resistance, Protectors: Muslim-Christian Relations in Eastern Anatolia during World War I. Gorgias Press.
- Wilmshurst, David (2000). The Ecclesiastical Organisation of the Church of the East, 1318–1913 (PDF). Peeters Publishers.
