= Karchak-e Larijani =

Karchak-e Larijani کرچک لاريجانی
- Village
- Location within Iran
- Coordinates: 36°32′52″N 52°19′51″E
- Country: Iran
- Province: Mazandaran
- County: Mahmudabad
- Bakhsh: Central
- Rural District: Ahlamerestaq-e Jonubi

Population (2016)
  - Total: 258
- Time zone: UTC+3:30 (IRST)

Karchak-e Larijani (Persian: کرچک لاريجانی, also Romanized as Karchak-e Lārījānī; also known as Karchak) is a village in Ahlamerestaq-e Jonubi Rural District, in the Central District of Mahmudabad County, Mazandaran Province, Iran.

At the time of the 2006 National Census, the village's population was 302 in 81 households. The following census in 2011 counted 294 people in 84 households. The 2016 census measured the population of the village as 258 people in 87 households.
