= Shumia =

Village in Mazandaran province, Iran

Shumia Persian: شوميا
- Village
- Location within Iran
- Coordinates: 36°33′31″N 52°15′23″E
- Country: Iran
- Province: Mazandaran
- County: Mahmudabad
- District: Central
- Rural District: Ahlamerestaq-e Jonubi

Population (2016)
  - Total: 1,049
- Time zone: UTC+3:30 (IRST)

Shumia (Persian: شوميا) (Note: Also romanized as Shoomiya, Shūmīā, and Shūmīyā; also known as Shūmā) is a village in Ahlamerestaq-e Jonubi Rural District (Note: Formerly Ahlamerestaq Rural District) of the Central District in Mahmudabad County, Mazandaran province, Iran.

== Demographics ==
=== Population ===
At the time of the 2006 National Census, the village's population was 1,086 in 266 households. The following census in 2011 counted 1,077 people in 311 households. The 2016 census measured the population of the village as 1,049 people in 351 households.
