= Galird =

Galird or Gelyard or Geliyerd or Geleyerd (Persian: گليرد) may refer to:

- Galird, Alborz
- Gelyard, Juybar, Mazandaran Province
- Geleyerd, Mahmudabad, Mazandaran Province
