= Tasmalu =

Tasmalu طسمالو
- Village
- Location within Iran
- Coordinates: 37°30′35″N 45°10′49″E
- Country: Iran
- Province: West Azerbaijan
- County: Urmia
- Bakhsh: Central
- Rural District: Torkaman

Population (2006)
  - Total: 322
- Time zone: UTC+3:30 (IRST)
  - Summer (DST): UTC+4:30 (IRDT)

Tasmalu (Persian: طسمالو, romanized: Ţasmālū'; Syriac: Tasmālūi) is a village in Torkaman Rural District, in the Central District of Urmia County, West Azerbaijan Province, Iran. At the 2006 census, its population was 322, in 91 families.

== History ==
Tasmālūi (today called Tasmalu) was inhabited by 18 Church of the East Christian families with no church or priest in 1877, as per Edward Lewes Cutts. Basil Nikitin recorded that the village was populated by Christians and Muslims just before the First World War. It was located in the Baranduz District.

== Bibliography ==
- Wilmshurst, David (2000). The Ecclesiastical Organisation of the Church of the East, 1318–1913 (PDF). Peeters Publishers.
