= Shuma =

Shuma may refer to:

- Shuma, Iran, a village in Mazandaran Province
- Shuma-Gorath, a fictional character
- Kia Shuma, a car by Kia Motors
- Schutzmannschaft, auxiliary police from locals in Nazi-occupied countries
- Ogata Shuma, character from Japanese folklore
