= Geleyerd, Mahmudabad =

Village in Mazandaran province, Iran

Geleyerd Persian: گليرد
- Village
- Location within Iran
- Coordinates: 36°32′11″N 52°17′11″E
- Country: Iran
- Province: Mazandaran
- County: Mahmudabad
- District: Central
- Rural District: Ahlamerestaq-e Jonubi

Population (2016)
  - Total: 1,174
- Time zone: UTC+3:30 (IRST)

Geleyerd (Persian: گليرد) is a village in Ahlamerestaq-e Jonubi Rural District (Note: Formerly Ahlamerestaq Rural District) of the Central District in Mahmudabad County, Mazandaran province, Iran.

== Demographics ==
=== Population ===
At the time of the 2006 National Census, the village's population was 1,074 in 279 households. The following census in 2011 counted 1,094 people in 332 households. The 2016 census measured the population of the village as 1,174 people in 391 households.
