= Harazpey =

Harazpey (Persian: هرازپي) may refer to:

- Harazpey-ye Gharbi Rural District
- Harazpey-ye Jonubi Rural District
- Harazpey-ye Shomali Rural District
