= Ruben Filian =

Ruben Filian (December 10, 1952, Yerevan - January 7, 1983, Goa, India), Armenian prose writer, translator, and teacher of yoga and karate.

== Biography ==
Ruben Filian was born in Yerevan in 1952 and graduated from the Journalism Department of the Faculty of Philology at Yerevan State University. His short stories were first published in the literary magazine Garun. His first book, a collection of short stories entitled An Unknown Autobiography, was published in 1980.

In 1981, Filian left Soviet Armenia. He went to France, then travelled to Egypt and Jordan, and eventually settled in the Indian state of Goa, at the famous Arambol Beach, where he taught yoga, karate, music, and Eastern philosophy.

Ruben Filian's life ended in Arambol on January 7, 1983. His remains are buried in the cemetery in Yerevan's Zeytun district.

== Works ==
In 1992, with the support of his father, Pargev Filian, Ruben Filian's book Ambassador of Your Country was published. It included the eponymous novel, short stories, and miniatures. Before leaving Soviet Armenia, Ruben Filian adapted into Armenian, through translation, the monumental treatise Viveka Chudamani by the Indian spiritual philosopher Sri Shankaracharya.

Both the novel and his short prose and fairy-tale stories inhabit not only the fantastical world deliberately created by Filian, but also reveal the absurd phenomena of human existence and experience.

Ruben Filian's prose is a dialogue with Armenian medieval texts and the works of Samuel Beckett, Italo Calvino, and Robert Walser.

And so our airplane made a small circle over Your country—over Your luminous country, which was made only of the great and small mirrors of the Word and appeared as we see ourselves in a mirror… for everything that belonged to the Word was ours… And even the highest peaks were sinking into that sea of moist lights, plunging into luminous memory, losing their boundary with the wet sky, from which the motionless sun, like a fountain of light, was clarifying the memories of the future, and we were flying very, very high above the surface of that moist sea and soaring higher than all, while our soul floated over those luminous waters and brought to us only the VOICE OF THE VOICE HEARD FROM BEHIND, WHICH WAS OUR SILENCE.

— Ambassador of Your Country

He was a writer and could not stand his successful works, because everyone liked them, and they already seemed to belong to someone else. As for the weak works, which people did not like, he was FORCED to love them himself.

And after all that, is the sea still stirred? It is an echo… Certainly, it is an echo…

I coughed… I don't want to believe that no one in the world knows about this…

Ruben Filian is a unique author in Armenian literature. The absence of his literature has always been felt, but he was among us.

— prose writer Aram Pachyan, on Ruben Filian

He was born a writer, but he rarely associated with writers, because he hated bookishness and the highly Sovietized game of playing the writer. The members of his large circle of friends were mainly artists and actor-directors. His many-sided soul was accessible only to those for whom the motto-vision of freedom was particularly and above all important. He was born a writer, but never to live and create within the Soviet system. He had countless opportunities to advance within that system and attain positions, but he did not make use of those opportunities for even a moment, because with his whole soul he hated lies, falsehood, hollow glory, and vanity.

— poet and prose writer Armen Shekoyan, Pilgrimage to Heaven

== Books ==
- An Unknown Autobiography, Yerevan, Soviet Writer, 1980, 120 pages
- Ambassador of Your Country, Yerevan, Nairi, 1992, 256 pages
- An Unknown Autobiography, 2nd edition, Yerevan, Darak, 2021, 144 pages.
- Ambassador of Your Country, 2nd edition, Yerevan, ARI Literature Foundation, 2022, 135 pages
- Sri Shankaracharya, Viveka Chudamani, Yerevan, Newmag, 2022, p. 132 (adapted through translation by Ruben Filian).
