= Baudeh-ye Olya =

Village in Mazandaran province, Iran

Baudeh-ye Olya Persian: بائوده عليا
- Village
- Location within Iran
- Coordinates: 36°34′52″N 52°20′46″E
- Country: Iran
- Province: Mazandaran
- County: Mahmudabad
- District: Central
- Rural District: Ahlamerestaq-e Jonubi

Population (2016)
  - Total: 624
- Time zone: UTC+3:30 (IRST)

Baudeh-ye Olya (Persian: بائوده عليا) (Note: Also romanized as Bā’ūdeh-ye ‘Olyā) is a village in Ahlamerestaq-e Jonubi Rural District (Note: Formerly Ahlamerestaq Rural District) of the Central District in Mahmudabad County, Mazandaran province, Iran.

== Demographics ==
=== Population ===
At the time of the 2006 National Census, the village's population was 706 in 186 households. The following census in 2011 counted 709 people in 204 households. The 2016 census measured the population of the village as 624 people in 211 households.
