= Aram Grigoryan =

Aram Grigoryan may refer to:

- Aram Grigorian (born 1998), Russian-Emirati judoka and sambo competitor
- Aram Grigoryan (politician) (born 1977), Armenian politician
- Aram Grigoryan (judoka) (born 1992), Russian judoka
