= Aaram =

Aaram may refer to:

- Aaram, a trade name for Alprazolam
- Aaram (film), a 1951 Indian film
- Aaram, an old way of spelling Åram, a village in Sunnmøre, Norway

== See also ==
- Aram (disambiguation)
