= Naybin =

Village in West Azerbaijan province, Iran

Naybin Persian: ناي بين
- Village
- Location within Iran
- Coordinates: 37°24′36″N 45°13′22″E
- Country: Iran
- Province: West Azerbaijan
- County: Urmia
- District: Central
- Rural District: Torkaman

Population (2016)
  - Total: 604
- Time zone: UTC+3:30 (IRST)

Naybin (Persian: ناي بين) (Note: Also romanized as Nāybīn) is a village in Torkaman Rural District of the Central District in Urmia County, West Azerbaijan province, Iran.

== Demographics ==
=== Population ===
At the time of the 2006 National Census, the village's population was 422 in 109 households. The following census in 2011 counted 537 people in 145 households. The 2016 census measured the population of the village as 604 people in 161 households.
