= Ars lunga =

Armenian music duo

Ars lunga is a piano and cello duo established in 2009 in Yerevan, Armenia by two leading Armenian artists: cellist Aram Talalyan and pianist Julietta Vardanyan. Since its establishment, the group has performed numerous recitals across Armenia, CIS countries, Far and Near East, Europe, and Iran. They have participated in several well-known festivals such as "The Return festival," "National Cello Festival" in Yerevan, "Fajr Festival" in Tehran, "Moscow Autumn" modern music festival, Contemporary Music Festival in Ukraine, Martisor Festival in Moldova, Deia music festival in Spain, and many others.

The group has performed at prestigious locations such as Oji Hall in Tokyo, Moscow Composers Hall, Utrecht Conservatory, Vahdad Hall in Tehran, Organ Hall in Cisnau, Moldova, and others. In 2011, Ars lunga became an NGO registered in Yerevan, Armenia.

Several well-known composers have written pieces dedicated to the duo, including Hooshyar Khayam and Rebecca Ashooghian from Iran, Suren Zakaryan and Mikhail Kokzhaev from Armenia, Artyom Kokzhaev from Russia, and Haig Boyadjian and Jakov Jakoulov from the United States.

During the 2012–2013 season, the duo recorded live on Armenian television three sets of complete music for cello and piano by Robert Schumann, Aram Khachaturian, and Tigran Mansurian. The repertoire of the group ranges from original Baroque compositions of the 17th-18th centuries (with harpsichord or organ instead of piano) to complete sets of standard Classical and Romantic works such as Beethoven's complete sonatas and variations, Schumann's complete pieces, Mendelssohn's complete works, Brahms's complete sonatas, and more.

In 2013, Ars lunga NGO completed and produced a large-scale recording project called the "Anthology of Armenian music for cello and piano." It contains practically the entire music from 1900 till now written for piano and cello by composers of Armenian origin living in and outside the motherland. The album contains 12 CDs and 60 compositions. This album has been spread worldwide and can be found in listening libraries of major universities and conservatories in the US, Russia, Germany, Canada, Near and Far East countries, Library of Congress in the US, as well as several European Public Radio stations and CIS countries Composer Unions. In January 2015, the duo recorded the complete works of Father Komitas (Soghomon Soghomonyan) arranged for cello and piano. The recording was dedicated to the victims of the 1915 Armenian Genocide, and the general sponsor was the Grand Lodge of Armenia. Presently, the duo is working on an "Anthology of Armenian trio" recording project with several Armenian violinists who live across the world.

The main perspective and goals of the duo are to perform and record contemporary music of Armenian composers along with music of the world.

== Awards ==
In 2012 Duo “Ars lunga” received a Gold Medal from the Union of Moscow composers for "outstanding performance."
