= Amir Taghi =

American fashion designer

Amir Taghi (born 1996) is an American fashion designer from Houston, Texas. He attended St. Francis Episcopal School and graduated from Episcopal High School in Houston. While still quite young, Taghi began designing women's fashion and debuted his first fashion collection while still a freshman in high school. He followed that effort with a second collection the next year. During the summer of 2013 he obtained an internship with the renowned designer Oscar de la Renta. That same year he partnered with fellow Houstonian David Peck for production of his own line of clothing.

Taghi made his New York debut on September 6, 2014, during Mercedes Benz Fashion Week, when his fashion line appeared on the runway at the Helen Mills Event Space.

Taghi created a limited edition dress together with Nazanin Boniadi and Milad Ahmadi (Haus of Milad) which symbolizes Iranian women's fight for freedom. The dress has previously been worn by Farah Pahlavi (former Queen of Iran), Shohreh Aghdashloo (actress), Masih Alinejad (journalist and activist) and Aram Ostadian-Binai (social entrepreneur).
