= Darbarud =

Village in West Azerbaijan province, Iran

Darbarud Persian: داربارود
- Village
- Location within Iran
- Coordinates: 37°24′21″N 45°13′20″E
- Country: Iran
- Province: West Azerbaijan
- County: Urmia
- District: Central
- Rural District: Torkaman

Population (2016)
  - Total: 501
- Time zone: UTC+3:30 (IRST)

Darbarud (Persian: داربارود, romanized: Dārbārūd; Syriac: Darbarūd) (Note: Also known as Darbari and Derbarud.) is a village in Torkaman Rural District of the Central District in Urmia County, West Azerbaijan province, Iran.

== History ==
In 1862, Darbarūd was populated by 20 Church of the East Christian families and did not have a church or a priest, according to the Russian archimandrite Sophoniah. There were 50 Church of the East Christian families in 1877 with no priest or church, as per Edward Lewes Cutts. François Lesné, the Apostolic delegate of the Roman Catholic Church in Iran, recorded that the village was looted and burned by Kurds in 1908. A Muslim man from Darbarūd abducted a Christian woman from Sārdārūd in 1910, but she was ultimately released because she refused to convert to Islam. Basil Nikitin, the Russian consul at Urmia, recorded that the village was populated by Christians and Muslims just before the First World War. It was located in the Baranduz district.

== Demographics ==
=== Population ===
At the time of the 2006 National Census, the village's population was 476 in 126 households. The following census in 2011 counted 497 people in 145 households. The 2016 census measured the population of the village as 501 people in 169 households.

== Bibliography ==
- Hellot-Bellier, Florence (2017). "The Resistance of Urmia Assyrians to Violence at the Beginning of the Twentieth Century". In David Gaunt; Naures Atto; Soner O. Barthoma (eds.). Let Them Not Return: Sayfo – The Genocide against the Assyrian, Syriac and Chaldean Christians in the Ottoman Empire (PDF). pp. 70–99.
- Wilmshurst, David (2000). The Ecclesiastical Organisation of the Church of the East, 1318–1913 (PDF). Peeters Publishers.
