= Aram Byer James =

American lawyer

- Aram James is a national advocate for discontinuing police use of tasers.
- Occupation: Civil rights attorney

Aram Byer James is a former Santa Clara County, CA Assistant Public Defender, police watchdog, social activist, and civil rights attorney. As an expert on the defense of necessity, he headed the team of attorneys defending Stanford University students and professors arrested in anti-apartheid protests in 1980’s. He is an advocate of jury nullification, educator in the use of the Marsden Motion to fire ineffective public defenders, a critic of the prison industrial complex, and critic of police use of tasers and racial profiling.
