= Armenian patriarch =

Armenian patriarch is a term that may be used to describe:

== Legendary Armenian figures ==
- Hayk, legendary patriarch and founder of the Armenian nation
- Aram, a descendant of Hayk, from whom the name of Armenia may derive
- History of Armenia, an early account of Armenia, lists Armenian patriarchs according to Moses
  - Ara the Handsome, legendary Armenian hero and king

== Patriarchs (catholicoses) of the Armenian Church ==
- List of catholicoi of all Armenians
- List of Armenian patriarchs of Constantinople
- List of Armenian Catholic patriarchs of Cilicia
- List of Armenian catholicoi of Cilicia
- List of Armenian patriarchs of Jerusalem

== See also ==
- History of Armenia
- Aram (given name)
- Vahagn, a god of fire, thunder, and war worshiped in ancient Armenia
