= Mahmudabad, Mazandaran =

City in Mazandaran province, Iran

Mahmudabad Persian: محمودآباد
- City
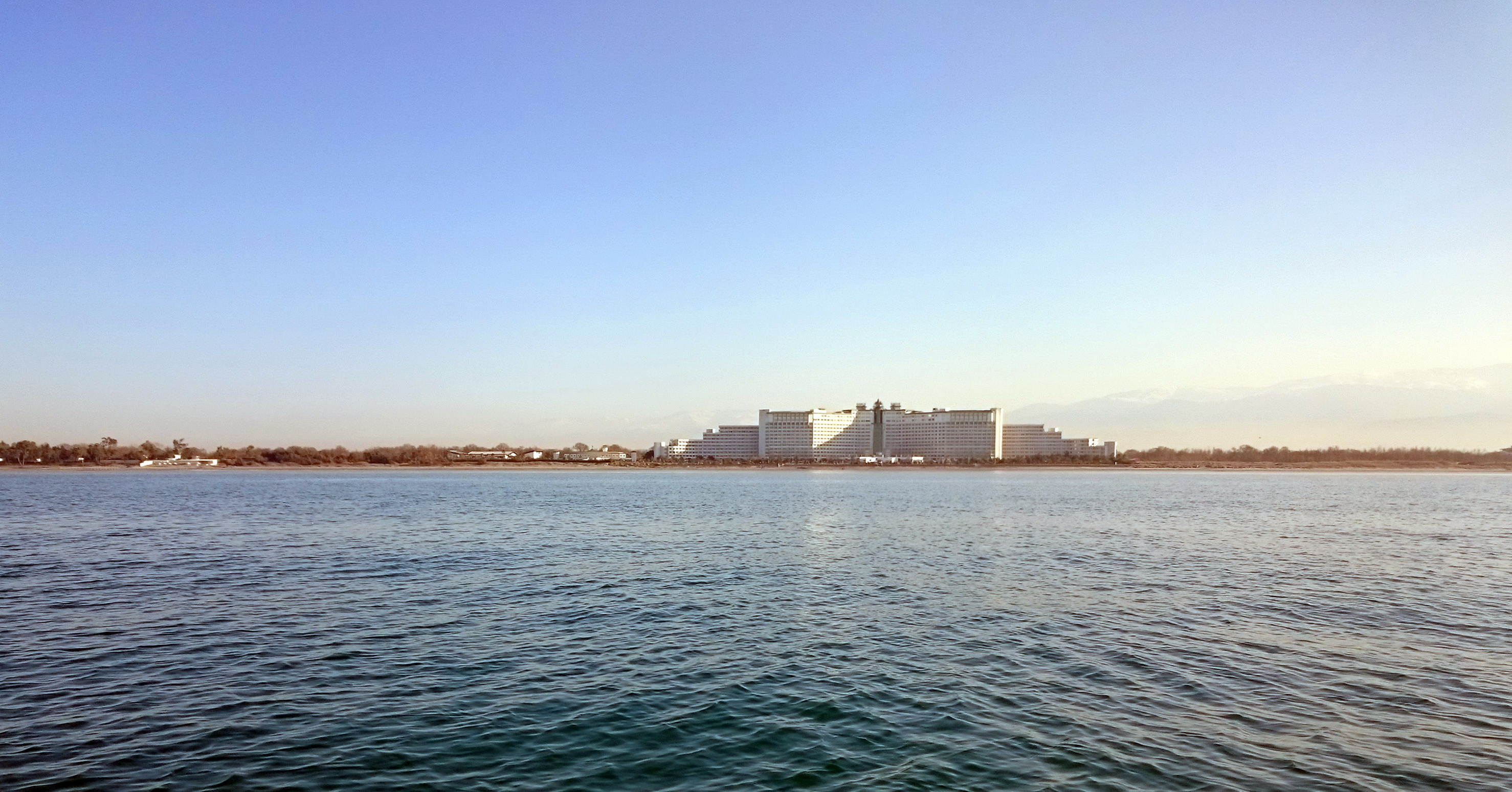
- Oil complex from the sea

- Location within Iran
- Coordinates: 36°37′43″N 52°15′52″E
- Country: Iran
- Province: Mazandaran
- County: Mahmudabad
- District: Central

Population (2016)
  - Total: 31,844
- Time zone: UTC+3:30 (IRST)

Mahmudabad (Persian: محمودآباد) (Note: Also romanized as Mahmoud Abad and Maḥmūdâbâd) (MA or M.A.) is a city in the Central District of Mahmudabad County, Mazandaran province, Iran, serving as capital of both the county and the district. The city is on the Caspian Sea.

Mahmudabad, which was once part of Amol County and served as its port, has a humid subtropical climate with cool and humid winters.

The history of the city goes back to 1889 when Haj Mohammad Hassan Khan began development efforts in the city during the reign of Naser al-Din Shah Qajar (1831–1896). He undertook the construction of a mosque, a caravanserai (later a fortress), a port, a bathhouse, a commercial building, and residential structures. Some of the city's neighborhoods include: Tuska Mahalleh, Ahu Mahalleh, Talik Sar and Surakh Mazu (Sofla, Vosta and Olya).

== Demographics ==
People of the city speak Mazanderani and Perisan languages.

=== Population ===
The 1996 national census recorded a population of 19,883 people. At the time of the 2006 National Census, the city's population was 27,561 in 7,513 households. The following census in 2011 counted 31,771 people in 9,572 households. The 2016 census measured the population of the city as 31,844 people in 10,399 households.
