= Aram Talalyan =

Armenian cellist and conductor

- Born: Aram Talalyan
- Origin: Yerevan, Armenia
- Occupations: cellist, conductor
- Member of: Ars lunga

Aram Talalyan (Armenian: Արամ Թալալյան) is an Armenian cellist and conductor.

== Biography ==
Aram Talalyan was born in Yerevan in the family of renowned musician Geronty Talalyan. He graduated from Yale University (USA) with master's degree in cello and conducting. Since 1997 he has been teaching cello and chamber music in Yerevan State Conservatory. Aram Talalyan is a founder and artistic director of “Yerevan Baroque Festival” and “Talalyan brothers” Viola-Cello Festival in Armenia. 2010-2011 he has been appointed as an artistic director of Classical Series at Cafesjian Center for the Arts in Yerevan (Armenia), 2000-2009 - served as a cellist of Komitas String Quartet. SInce 2015 Talalyan is a cellist of Aram Khachaturian State string quartet.

Aram Talalyan has collaborated with such renowned artists as Claude Frank, Yo Yo Ma, Günther Herbig, Jesse Levin, Emin Khachaturian, Wolfgang Meyer, Vladimir Spivakov, Diemut Poppen, Ani and Ida Kavafian, Levon Chilingirian, Christopher Stembridge, Darko Brlek, Ilya Gringolts, Sergey Khachatryan, and many others. He is a first performer and initiator of a great number of compositions for orchestra, chamber ensembles and cello.

Since 2009 he has formed a piano-cello duo “Ars lunga”, together with pianist Julietta Vardanyan, with whom he completed a large scale unprecedented recording project “Anthology of Armenian music for cello and piano” album with 12 CDs and 60 compositions by Armenian composers. During 2011-2014 seasons he was invited to conduct in prestigious international festivals: “Traveling Notes", "Melodies of Peace", “The Return Festival”, "National Gallery of Arts" and several State Academic orchestras in Ukraine. In 2013 was invited as a president of the jury of Aram Khachaturian International Cello Competition

== Awards ==
- Talalyan has received State Honor Award from President of Armenia, 2009
- Medal of Gratitude, 2019

== See also ==
- Ars lunga
