= Aram (surname) =

Aram (Armenian: Արարատեան) is an Armenian origin word which is used as a surname. People with the surname include:

- Abbas Aram (1906–1985), Iranian diplomat and politician
- Ahmad Aram (1902–1998), Iranian translator, writer and educator
- Colette Aram (1967–1983), British murder victim
- Eugene Aram (1704–1759), English philologist and murderer
- Hur Aram (born 1971), South Korean writer
- Kamrooz Aram (born 1978), Iranian American artist
- M. Aram (1927–1997), Indian educator and peace advocate
- Siegfried Aram (1891–1978), German lawyer and cultural politician
- Zeev Aram (1931–2021), British furniture and interior designer

== See also ==
- Aram (given name)
- Aram (disambiguation)
