= Marsden motion =

California procedure for replacing court-appointed defense counsel

A Marsden motion is a request by a criminal defendant in a California state court asking the judge to discharge a court-appointed attorney and appoint a new one. A defendant cannot simply fire appointed counsel. The judge decides. The request is based on a claim that the attorney is providing inadequate representation or that the defendant and attorney have an irreconcilable conflict. The name comes from the California Supreme Court case People v. Marsden (1970).

== Standard ==
A trial court must appoint new counsel only if the record shows that failing to replace the attorney would substantially impair the defendant's right to the assistance of counsel. This can happen because the attorney is not providing adequate representation, or because the defendant and attorney are embroiled in an irreconcilable conflict that makes ineffective representation likely. A denial is reviewed on appeal for abuse of discretion.

Disagreement over reasonable tactical decisions does not by itself create an irreconcilable conflict. A court also need not find an irreconcilable conflict if the defendant has not made a sustained good-faith effort to work out disagreements with counsel.

== Hearing ==
The court must give the defendant a chance to state specific complaints about the attorney, and the attorney a chance to respond. The hearing is an informal one, not a full adversarial proceeding. Where the defendant's account and the attorney's account conflict, the court may accept the attorney's explanation. The prosecutor is generally excluded, because the defendant may need to discuss confidential matters.

No formal motion is required. A court must hold a hearing when there is at least some clear indication, from the defendant personally or through counsel, that the defendant wants a substitute attorney. The same rules apply before and after conviction. If the defendant shows that the right to counsel has been substantially impaired, the court must appoint substitute counsel as attorney of record for all purposes. It may not appoint "conflict" counsel only to evaluate the complaint.

== People v. Marsden ==
Michael John Marsden was charged in Monterey County with forgery counts for cashing stolen money orders. During trial he told the judge he was not being adequately represented and offered to give specific reasons. The trial judge denied his request without hearing them.

On appeal, the California Supreme Court (opinion by Justice Mosk) held that the judge abused his discretion. The court relied on Gideon v. Wainwright, which established that defendants who cannot afford a lawyer are entitled to appointed counsel. It held that a judge cannot properly decide whether to replace counsel based only on courtroom observations, because the judge cannot know how adequate the representation was without hearing the defendant's specific complaints. The judgment was reversed.

== Federal cases on attorney-client conflict ==
The Ninth Circuit has held that forcing a defendant to go to trial with an attorney with whom there is an irreconcilable conflict can deny the defendant effective assistance of counsel. In Daniels v. Woodford, the court held that a serious breakdown in communication can result in an inadequate defense even when counsel is competent.

== Essential elements ==
=== Conflict between client and attorney ===
The language of the Marsden decision contains the sufficient criterion that attorney and defendant are "embroiled in such an irreconcilable conflict that ineffective representation is likely to result."
