= Uzan Eskandari =

Uzan Eskandari اوزان اسكندري
- Village
- Location within Iran
- Coordinates: 37°27′22″N 45°17′13″E
- Country: Iran
- Province: West Azerbaijan
- County: Urmia
- Bakhsh: Central
- Rural District: Torkaman

Population (2006)
  - Total: 333
- Time zone: UTC+3:30 (IRST)
  - Summer (DST): UTC+4:30 (IRDT)

Uzan Eskandari (Persian: اوزان اسكندري, also Romanized as Ūzān Eskandarī; also known as Torkamān, Torkmān, and Ūzān Torkamān) is a village in Torkaman Rural District, in the Central District of Urmia County, West Azerbaijan Province, Iran. At the 2006 census, its population was 333, in 83 families.
