= Sardrud, West Azerbaijan =

Village in West Azerbaijan province, Iran

Sardrud Persian: سردرود
- Village
- Location within Iran
- Coordinates: 37°24′12″N 45°14′01″E
- Country: Iran
- Province: West Azerbaijan
- County: Urmia
- District: Central
- Rural District: Torkaman

Population (2016)
  - Total: 476
- Time zone: UTC+3:30 (IRST)

Sardrud (Persian: سردرود, romanized: Sardrūd; Syriac: Sārdārūd) is a village in Torkaman Rural District of the Central District in Urmia County, West Azerbaijan province, Iran.

== History ==
Sārdārūd was inhabited by 30 Church of the East Christian families in 1877 with no priest or church, according to Edward Lewes Cutts. It was located in the Baranduz District. François Lesné, the Apostolic delegate of the Roman Catholic Church in Iran, recorded that Sārdārūd was looted and burned by Kurds in 1908. A Christian woman from Sārdārūd who had been abducted by a Muslim man from Darbarud in 1910 was eventually returned to Toma Audo, Chaldean Catholic archbishop of Urmia, because she refused to convert to Islam.

== Demographics ==
=== Population ===
At the time of the 2006 National Census, the village's population was 305 in 63 households. The following census in 2011 counted 414 people in 103 households. The 2016 census measured the population of the village as 476 people in 119 households.

== Bibliography ==
- Hellot-Bellier, Florence (2017). "The Resistance of Urmia Assyrians to Violence at the Beginning of the Twentieth Century". In David Gaunt; Naures Atto; Soner O. Barthoma (eds.). Let Them Not Return: Sayfo – The Genocide against the Assyrian, Syriac and Chaldean Christians in the Ottoman Empire (PDF). pp. 70–99.
- Wilmshurst, David (2000). The Ecclesiastical Organisation of the Church of the East, 1318–1913 (PDF). Peeters Publishers.
