= Turkoman people =

Turkoman people may refer to:

- Turkmens
- Iraqi Turkmen
- Syrian Turkomans
- Oghuz Turks, Muslim nomadic group widely referred to as "Turkomens" in 10th–18th century sources

== See also ==
- Turkmen (disambiguation)
