= Tabbat, Urmia =

Village in West Azerbaijan province, Iran

Tabbat Persian: تبت
- Village
- Location within Iran
- Coordinates: 37°29′52″N 45°13′36″E
- Country: Iran
- Province: West Azerbaijan
- County: Urmia
- District: Central
- Rural District: Torkaman

Population (2016)
  - Total: 479
- Time zone: UTC+3:30 (IRST)

Tabbat (Persian: تبت) (Note: Also romanized as Tabat) is a village in Torkaman Rural District of the Central District in Urmia County, West Azerbaijan province, Iran.

== Demographics ==
=== Population ===
At the time of the 2006 National Census, the village's population was 531 in 155 households. The following census in 2011 counted 524 people in 172 households. The 2016 census measured the population of the village as 479 people in 157 households.
