= Julietta Vardanyan =

- Born: Julietta Vardanyan
- Origin: Yerevan, Armenia
- Occupations: Pianist, harpsichordist, organist
- Member of: Ars lunga

Julietta Vardanyan (Armenian: Ջուլիետա Վարդանյան) is an Armenian pianist, harpsichordist, and organist.

== Biography ==
Vardanyan was born in Yerevan. She graduated from the Yerevan State Conservatory (Professor Vagharshak Harutyunyan). She has had master classes by pianists Paul Badura-Skoda and Boris Berman (Obidos, Portugal).

As a soloist performed with Narekatsi, "Four Seasons" (Moscow), the Moldova's National Chamber Orchestras, Armenia State Youth, Opera and Ballet National and Zaporozhye (Ukraine) Symphonic Orchestras, conductors V. Bulakhov (Russia), C. Florea (Romania), A. Khaindrava (Georgia/Czech Republic), Sergey Smbatyan R. Asatryan, A. Talalyan, M. Kokzhayev, Y. Yakulov. She is the first performer of the piano concertos of Composer Yakov Yakulov (USA) and Hayg Boyadjian.

Since 2013 she is the executive director of "Talalyan Brothers" festival.

Since 2009 she has formed a piano-cello duo "Ars lunga".

At present "Ars Lunga" makes "Anthology of Armenian Chamber Music" recordings part 2, which summarizes Armenian piano trios (compositions for piano, violin and cello).

== See also ==
- Ars lunga
