= Türkmən, Qabala =

Türkmən
- Location within Azerbaijan Location within Shaki-Zagatala Economic Region
- Coordinates: 40°51′29″N 47°39′22″E
- Country: Azerbaijan
- Rayon: Qabala
- Time zone: UTC+4 (AZT)
  - Summer (DST): UTC+5 (AZT)

Türkmən (also, Tyurkman) is a village in the Qabala Rayon of Azerbaijan.
