= Aram D'Abro =

Aram d'Abro was an Armenian-American science popularizer and author, known for his book The Evolution of Scientific Thought from Newton to Einstein.

There is little biographical information on Aram d'Abro. Several sources erroneously give his first name as "Abraham". A border crossing document from St. Albans, Vermont, dated September 24, 1910, gives his name as "Aram D'Abro", age 24, nationality Turkey, birthplace Paris, occupation professor of coastal engineering, marital status single. According to information from the Van Nostrand Company, Aram d'Abro was educated at Eton College, studied mathematics in Paris, and resided in New York City; he paid the costs of publication of his 2-volume work The Decline of Mechanism in Modern Physics (1939, Van Nostrand).

Abram d’Abro was Aram d'Abro's father. Abram d'Abro was an Armenian financier who settled in Trieste and was related to Muhammad Ali's Minister of Foreign Affairs Boghos Bey Yousefian. The original family name of D'Abro was Abroyan. Boghos Bey brought approximately 2,000 Armenians to Egypt.

== Selected publications ==
- The evolution of scientific thought from Newton to Einstein. New York: Boni & Liveright. 1927. LCCN 28011297. 2nd edition, revised and enlarged. New York: Dover Publications. 1950. LCCN 50009480.
- The decline of mechanism in modern physics. New York: D. Van Nostrand. 1939.
  - The rise of the new physics: its mathematical and physical theories (formerly titled "Decline of mechanism") (pbk). Vol. 2 vols. Dover Publications. 1951.
