= Aram Ostadian-Binai =

Danish Iranian social entrepreneur (born 1985)

- Born: 3 November 1985 (age 40); Tehran, Iran
- Occupation: Social entrepreneur
- Spouse: Navid Ostadian-Binai
- Website: www.aram-ob.com

Aram Ostadian-Binai (Persian: آرام‌ استادیان بینای, born 3 November 1985), is a Danish Iranian social entrepreneur. She is the founder of The Soulfuls and an advocate for women's empowerment.

== Early life ==
Ostadian-Binai was born in Tehran, Iran, in 1985. Her family immigrated to Denmark when she was a teenager, and she later settled in Copenhagen.

== Career ==
Ostadian-Binai started her career within the fashion industry, then transitioning to the publishing and media industries, where she later became a Digital Editor for Aller Media’s first digital-only and internationally oriented publication.

In 2018, she founded The Soulfuls, an organization and community that works to empower the next generation of women of all backgrounds within creative industries and entrepreneurship.

Ostadian-Binai received the Voice of The Year Award by ELLE Magazine on September 16, 2022, which was the same day Mahsa Jina Amini died in the custody of the morality police in Iran, sparking the Woman Life Freedom movement. Unaware of the fate of Mahsa Jina Amini in Iran the same day, Ostadian-Binai delivered an acceptance speech on stage wearing a dress that symbolized the fight for freedom by the women of Iran. The limited edition dress was created by Amir Taghi, Nazanin Boniadi and Milad Ahmadi (Haus of Milad), and has previously been worn by Farah Pahlavi (former Queen of Iran), Shohreh Aghdashloo (actress) and Masih Alinejad (journalist and activist). In the speech, Ostadian-Binai said: “I dream of a day when every woman in Denmark and beyond, no matter their skin colour, size, age or sexual orientation and faith can express themselves and dress as they want to.” As the Woman Life Freedom movement evolved during the fall of 2022, Ostadian-Binai organized art exhibitions in Copenhagen and Milan, showcasing art made by women in Iran related to the global movement. Ostadian-Binai appeared in the media as an expert and columnist regarding the Woman Life Freedom movement.

== Personal life ==
Aram Ostadian-Binai is married to Navid Ostadian-Binai, and they have two sons together.

She is fluent in Persian, Danish and English.
