= People v. Marsden =

California Supreme Court decision regarding appointed council

- Supreme Court of California

Decided February 26, 1970
- Full case name: The People, Plaintiff and Respondent, v. Michael John Marsden, Defendant and Appellant.
- Citation(s): 465 P.2d 44; 2 Cal.3d 118; 84 Cal. Rptr. 156

Holding
- A defendant who motions to replace their court-appointed counsel must be allowed a hearing to explain their reasoning. Trial court reversed.

Court membership
- Chief Justice: Mathew Tobriner (Note: Acting Chief Justice)
- Associate Justices: Marshall F. McComb, Stanley Mosk, Raymond E. Peters, Louis H. Burke, Raymond L. Sullivan, John B. Molinari (Note: Filling vacancy)

Case opinions
- Majority: Mosk, joined by Tobriner, Peters, Burke, Sullivan
- Concurrence: Molinari
- Dissent: McComb

People v. Marsden 2 Cal.3d 118 is a 1970 California Supreme Court decision that held it was error for the trial court to deny a defendant's motion to relieve his court-appointed counsel without holding a hearing to allow the defendant to explain his grounds. The trial court had denied the motion based on the trial judge's own observations of the proceedings and belief that the attorney was providing effective representation. Criminal defendants in the United States have the right to appointed counsel if they cannot afford to hire an attorney under the Sixth Amendment as interpreted by the United States Supreme Court case Gideon v. Wainwright.

As a result of the court's decision in Marsden, criminal defendants in California courts can ask for Marsden hearings, where they are given an opportunity to ask for new court-appointed counsel. Such hearings are held in closed court; the district attorney and all spectators are asked to leave the courtroom. It is rare for such hearings to result in the replacement of court-appointed counsel; defendants do not have an absolute right to an appointed lawyer of their choice.
