= Aram Kocharyan =

Armenian politician (1952–2022)

Governor of the Lori Province
- In office 8 December 2006 – 28 July 2011
- Preceded by: Henrik Kochinyan
- Succeeded by: Arthur Nalbandyan

Personal details
- Born: Aram Volodya Kocharyan; 14 November 1958 Kirovakan, Armenian SSR, Soviet Union
- Died: 24 August 2022 (aged 63)
- Party: RPA
- Education: Armenian State Pedagogical University

Aram Volodya Kocharyan (Armenian: Արամ Վոլոդյայի Քոչարյան; 14 November 1958 – 24 August 2022) was an Armenian politician. A member of the Republic Party, he served as governor of Lori Province from 2006 to 2011.

== Death ==
Kocharyan died on 24 August 2022, at the age of 68.
