= Aram Roston =

American investigative journalist

- Education: Columbia University (1988)
- Occupation: Investigative journalist

Aram Roston is an American investigative journalist, and author of The Man Who Pushed America to War: The Extraordinary Life, Adventures, and Obsessions of Ahmad Chalabi He is a correspondent for Reuters.

Roston has written for Newsweek, The New York Times, GQ, Mother Jones, The Nation, The Guardian, The Observer, New Statesman and other publications.

In 2020, his reporting on U.S. evangelical leader Jerry Falwell Jr., a key supporter of Donald Trump, preceded Falwell’s resignation from Liberty University. In 2020, Roston published an exclusive interview with Giancarlo Granda, a former business partner of evangelical leader and university president Jerry Falwell Jr, Granda alleged a multiyear sexual relationship with Falwell and his wife, even as the couple led the nation’s largest Christian university, Liberty University. Falwell stepped down the day after the report.

In 2019, Roston reported that Donald Trump’s fixer Michael Cohen had helped Falwell resolve a problem related to “racy photos” in 2015 months before encouraging Falwell to endorse Donald Trump for President. Falwell's 2016 endorsement of Trump during the Iowa caucus helped Trump lock up Evangelical support.

In 2010, Roston was awarded the Daniel Pearl Award by the International Consortium of Investigative Journalists, for a story called "How the US Funds the Taliban." The expose, which ran in November 2009 in The Nation, sparked a congressional investigation, and disclosed how a web of Pentagon contractors in Afghanistan routinely pay millions of dollars in protection money to the Taliban. The Daniel Pearl Award is named after the Wall Street Journal correspondent murdered in 2002 in Pakistan and recognizes outstanding international investigative journalism.

In 2016, Roston and his colleague Jeremy Singer-Vine were awarded the Scripps Howard investigative journalism Farfel Award for a BuzzFeed News story called "Fostering Profits," exposing abuses and deaths at the largest for-profit foster care company in the United States, The Mentor Network. The series sparked a U.S. Senate investigation. Other journalism awards include a 2011 Investigative Reporters and Editors prize, two Emmy awards for investigative business reporting, and a merit award from the Society of Silurians.

He has been a correspondent for BuzzFeed News from 2014 to 2018, was a correspondent for CNN from 1998 through 2001, a producer for the investigative unit at NBC Nightly News from 2003 through 2008, Newsweek in 2011 and 2012, and a police reporter for NY1 News in New York City, and has reported from around the world, including assignments in Iraq, Colombia, Liberia and Afghanistan.

== Works ==
- Roston, Aram; Schneyer, Joshua (September 4, 2020). "How Jerry Falwell Jr. mixed his personal finances with his university's". Yahoo News.
- Roston, Aram; Schneyer, Joshua (August 27, 2019). "Exclusive: Falwell steered Liberty University land deal benefiting his personal trainer". Reuters. Archived from the original on June 21, 2020.
- Roston, Aram (August 24, 2020). "Business partner of Falwells says he had affair with the power couple". Reuters. Archived from the original on August 24, 2020.
- Roston, Aram (May 31, 2018). "Jerry Falwell Jr. And A Young Pool Attendant Launched A Business That Sparked A Bitter Dispute". BuzzFeed News. Archived from the original on October 1, 2018.
- The Man Who Pushed America to War: The Extraordinary Life, Adventures, and Obsessions of Ahmad Chalabi, Nation Books (2008) ISBN 978-1-56858-353-2, (2009) ISBN 978-1-56858-415-7
- Meet the 'Prince of Marbella' - is he really supporting Iraq's insurgency?, Aram Roston, The Guardian, October 1, 2006
- Crossing Jordan: Iraq fuel deal sparks lawsuit, Aram Roston, investigative producer NBC News, June 18, 2008
- Former Iraq security contractors say firm bought black market weapons, T. Christian Miller, ProPublica, and Aram Roston, September 18, 2009
- How the US army protects its trucks – by paying the Taliban, Aram Roston, The Guardian, November 13, 2009
