= Tappeh Torkaman =

Village in West Azerbaijan province, Iran

Tappeh Torkaman Persian: تپه تركمان
- Village
- Location within Iran
- Coordinates: 37°26′15″N 45°13′50″E
- Country: Iran
- Province: West Azerbaijan
- County: Urmia
- District: Central
- Rural District: Torkaman

Population (2016)
  - Total: 509
- Time zone: UTC+3:30 (IRST)

Tappeh Torkaman (Persian: تپه تركمان) (Note: Also romanized as Tappeh Torkamān) is a village in Torkaman Rural District of the Central District in Urmia County, West Azerbaijan province, Iran.

== Demographics ==
=== Population ===
At the time of the 2006 National Census, the village's population was 437 in 120 households. The following census in 2011 counted 499 people in 148 households. The 2016 census measured the population of the village as 509 people in 166 households.
