= Sang Koti, Qaem Shahr =

Sang Koti سنگ كتی
- Village
- Location within Iran
- Coordinates: 36°29′22″N 52°47′49″E
- Country: Iran
- Province: Mazandaran
- County: Qaem Shahr
- Bakhsh: Central
- Rural District: Balatajan

Population (2006)
  - Total: 518
- Time zone: UTC+3:30 (IRST)
  - Summer (DST): UTC+4:30 (IRDT)

Sang Koti (Persian: سنگ کتی, also Romanized as Sang Kotī) is a village in Balatajan Rural District, in the Central District of Qaem Shahr County, Mazandaran Province, Iran. At the 2006 census, its population was 518, in 149 families.
