= Eugene Aram (disambiguation) =

Eugene Aram was an English philologist, convicted of murder and hanged in 1759.

Eugene Aram may also refer to:

- Eugene Aram (1914 film), a British film directed by Edwin J. Collins
- Eugene Aram (1915 film), an American film directed by Richard Ridgely
- Eugene Aram (1924 film), a British film directed by Arthur Rooke
- Eugene Aram (novel), 1832 novel by Edward George Bulwer-Lytton on which the films were based
- The Dream of Eugene Aram, the Murderer, 1831 poem by Thomas Hood
