= Aram Barlezizyan =

Armenian linguist (1937–2022)

Aram Karapeti Barlezizyan (12 September 1937 – 5 March 2022) was an Armenian linguist.

== Background ==
Barlezizyan was born 12 September 1937 to an Armenian family. He moved to Armenia in his early adulthood. He began to attend Brusov State University specialising in the field of foreign languages. At the same time he became a respectable professional accordion player. He lived and worked as an academic in Yerevan, Armenia. He continuously developed his profession, seeking new horizons of academic knowledge.

Barlezizyan died on 5 March 2022, at the age of 84. He was survived by his two children, three grandchildren and four great-grandchildren.

== Career and work ==
At the age of 38, Barlezizyan defended his Doctorate in Brusov University of Linguistics. After then he studied the French language as his chosen profession for over 50 years. At the same time he promoted the French language and culture within Eastern Europe and the Middle East.

Barlezizyan wrote many academic journal articles, contributed to various books and has written a 40,000 word (inclusive of 30,000 word variations) Armenian-French dictionary. His academic journal articles cover areas such as word history, word developments, word variations, methodological patterns to list a few. Barlezizyan also wrote multiple textbooks for the use in Brusov University.

== Works ==
- Stylistique du français moderne (figures et tropes) - Արդի ֆրանսերենի ոճաբանություն (բանադարձումներ և դարձույթներ), Yerevan, Lingva, 2010 (ISBN 978-9939-56-058-8)

== Achievements ==
Barlezizyan is most notable a recipient of:

- Medal of Movses Khorenatsi - awarded for outstanding achievements in the spheres of culture, art, literature, education, social sciences in Armenia.
- Medal of “Drastamat Kanayan” - awarded to officers and ensigns who have had significant input in the spheres of army building, development of ARM military-educational system and military-patriotic education of the young generation, and to individuals who have had considerable input in establishing and strengthening the Armenian Army.
- Ordre des Palmes Académiques (Order of Academic Palms) in 2006. - He was given this Honour for his continuous effort and knowledge developed in the field of Linguistics. He was acknowledged internationally for his work and his devotion to his field of research.
