= Harazpey-ye Gharbi Rural District =

Rural district in Mazandaran province, Iran

Harazpey-ye Gharbi Rural District Persian: دهستان هرازپي غربي
- Rural District
- Location within Iran
- Coordinates: 36°37′N 52°19′E
- Country: Iran
- Province: Mazandaran
- County: Mahmudabad
- District: Central
- Established: 1995
- Capital: Khatt-e Ahi

Population (2016)
  - Total: 8,029
- Time zone: UTC+3:30 (IRST)

Harazpey-ye Gharbi Rural District (Persian: دهستان هرازپي غربي) is in the Central District of Mahmudabad County, Mazandaran province, Iran. Its capital is the village of Khatt-e Ahi.

== Demographics ==
=== Population ===
At the time of the 2006 National Census, the rural district's population was 6,820 in 1,765 households. There were 6,908 inhabitants in 2,013 households at the following census of 2011. The 2016 census measured the population of the rural district as 8,029 in 2,627 households. The most populous of its 12 villages was Khatt-e Ahi, with 1,620 people.

=== Other villages in the rural district ===
- Ahi Mahalleh
- Eram
- Harabdeh
- Jura Kola
- Mateverij
- Mian Kolmarz
- Ormak Mahalleh
- Siahrud Sar
- Yamchi
