= Aram Mnatsakanov =

Russian chef (born 1962)

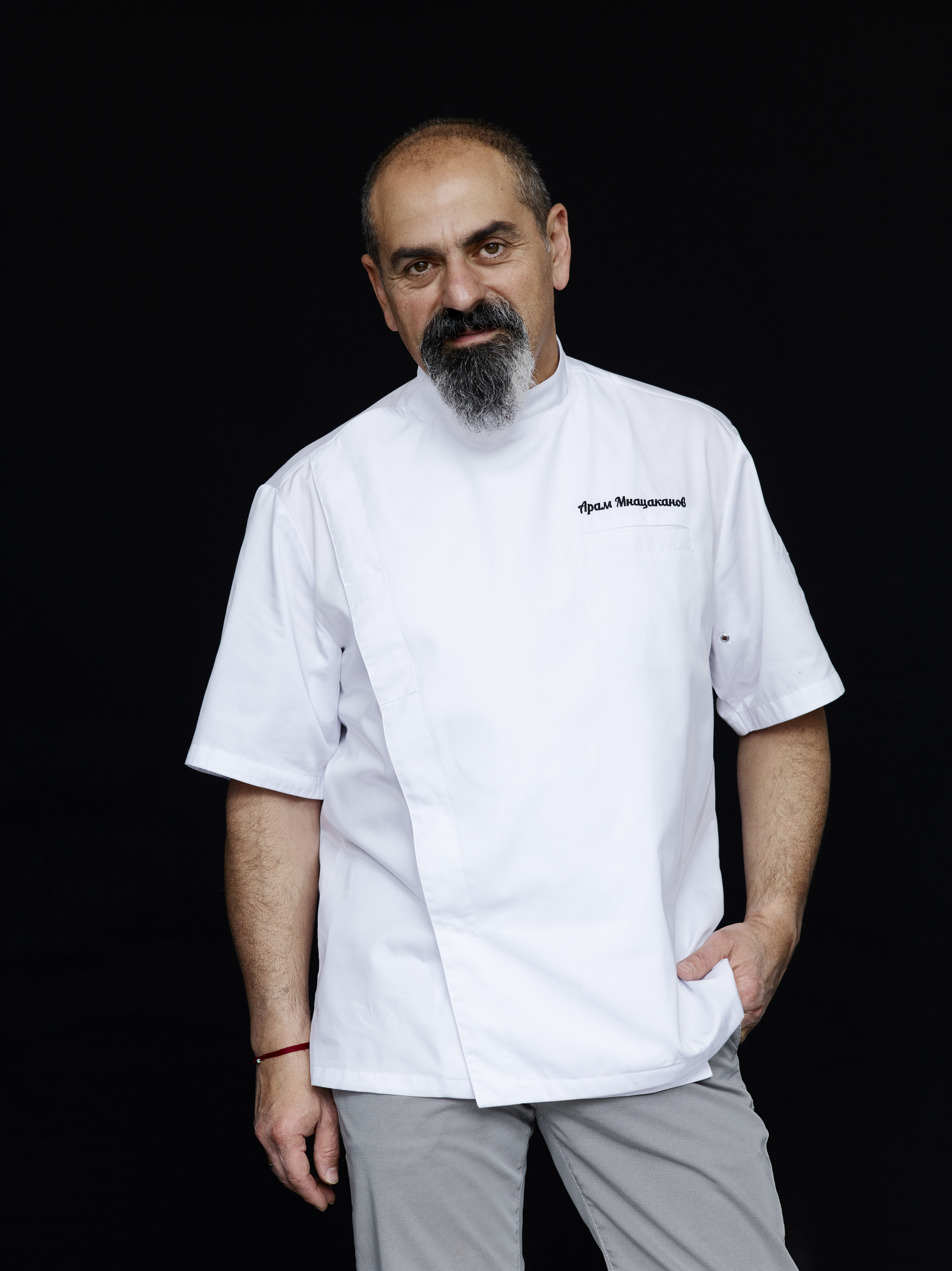
Aram Mnatsakanov

Aram Mnatsakanov (born November 20, 1962) is a chef, restaurateur, television personality, and the host of the Russian and Ukrainian versions of the TV shows Hell's Kitchen and Kitchen Nightmares. He currently owns and/or operates restaurants in Russia and Europe, such as Probka Restaurant Group and MINE in Berlin.

== Early life ==
Aram Mnatsakanov was born in an Armenian family in Baku on November 20, 1962.

== Television ==
In 2011, he acted as host on the Ukrainian TV channel "1+1" in the television project Pekelna Kitchen (Ukrainian Hell's Kitchen). He spent three seasons on the reality show and received the following awards: National Television Award of Ukraine "Teletriumph" – "Best Reality Show" (2011); Best Chef of Ukraine according to Focus magazine (2011).

In 2012, he hosted the show On Knives (1+1 channel), the Ukrainian version of the famous reality TV show Ramsay's Kitchen Nightmares by Gordon Ramsay.

In 2012 and 2013, he spent two seasons on the Russian TV show Hell's Kitchen (REN TV channel).

In 2013, Aram Mnatsakanov and Olga Freimut were the hosts of the show War of the Worlds. The auditor against the Chef on the Ukrainian TV channel Novyi Kanal.

In 2014, he became the host of the original REN-TV series Realnaya kuhnya.

In 2019, he hosted the SuperChef show on Che channel (now Peretz channel), a version of Gordon Ramsay's 24 Hours to Hell and Back.

== Probka Restaurant Group ==
Probka Restaurant Group
- Company type: Private
- Industry: Restaurants
- Founded: 2001; 25 years ago, St. Petersburg, Russia
- Headquarters: St. Petersburg, Russia
- Key people: Aram Mnatsakanov
- Website: www.probka.org

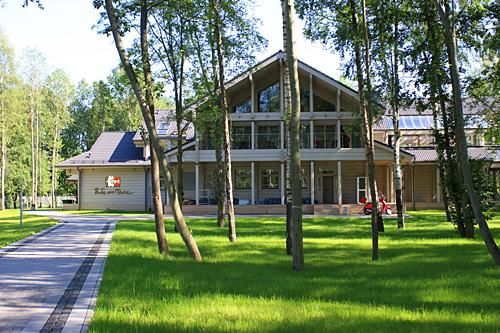
Rybka Na Dache, one of Probka Restaurant Group's restaurants in St. Petersburg, Russia.

Probka Restaurant Group (Russian Cyrillic: ресторанная группа Пробка) is a restaurant group that was founded by Mnatsakanov in 2001 with the establishment of the wine bar, Probka (English translation: wine bottle cork), and the Italian restaurant, Il Grappolo, in St. Petersburg. It now consists of nine Italian restaurants and one Russian restaurant which are spread all over St. Petersburg. It consists of Ryba Na Dache, Probka, Mozzarella Bar, Gusto and Il Grappolo restaurants among others. The Probka restaurant network consists of a strict Italian cuisine. Although this is the case, the group is experimenting with Asian cuisine as well. To date there are three restaurants with the name "Mozzarella Bar," the last one having been opened in February 2010. These restaurants are among the most successful and popular in St. Petersburg. Probka has become a very influential group in the Russian restaurant industry with mainly Italian cuisine.

=== History ===
In September 2001, Aram Mnatsakanov opened his first wine bar, Probka, in St. Petersburg.

In 2012, "Probka on Tsvetnoy" was opened, the first restaurant by Aram Mnatsakanov in Moscow, at 2 Tsvetnoy Boulevard.

In January 2017, Aram Mnatsakanov opened his first restaurant in Berlin – "MINE". His son, Mikhail Mnatsakanov, leads a team of chefs with Artem Dovlatyan and Nicolas Lorieux. In March 2020, the MINE restaurant was included in the list of 33 restaurants recommended for visiting in the German capital by the Michelin guide in "The Plate Michelin" category. The restaurant confirmed its status in 2021 and 2022.

Next door to the restaurant "Probka na Dobrolyubova" on the Petrogradskaya side in St. Petersburg, Aram Mnatsakanov opened his first Georgian restaurant, "MAMA TUTA", in 2018.

In July 2020, Aram Mnatsakanov and his team opened two new projects simultaneously in the center of Moscow on Patriarch Ponds: the second Georgian restaurant "MAMA TUTA" and the new Italian restaurant "MARITOZZO".

In 2021, restaurant R14 (previously named "Ryba") was included in Guide to the Best Pizzerias in the World.

In April 2021, the third Georgian restaurant, Mama Tuta, was opened on Bolshaya Morskaya Street; later, in 2022, it turned into the Italian restaurant Da Manu Pizza & Aperitivo.

On September 5, 2021, the Italian-Lebanese restaurant Mina opened in Moscow on Malaya Nikitskaya Street.

On May 8, 2022, two projects were opened in St. Petersburg in the same building on Krestovsky Island: the Italian-Lebanese restaurant Mina and the pizzeria Da Manu. The second Da Manu Pizza & Aperitivo Italian restaurant was opened on Bolshaya Morskaya Street in St. Petersburg, in the historical part of the city.
