= Ruben Safrastyan =

Armenian historian and Turkologist

- Ռուբեն Սաֆրաստյան
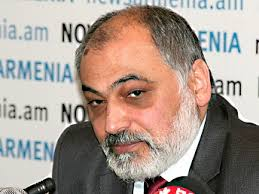
- Born: October 5, 1955 (age 70); Yerevan, Armenian SSR
- Citizenship: Armenia
- Education: Yerevan State University
- Spouse: Lilit Safrastyan
- Children: Aram Safrastyan; Arthur Safrastyan
- Awards: Movses Khorenatsi medal
- Scientific career
- Fields: Turkish studies; Ottoman studies; Middle Eastern studies; Regional studies
- Workplaces: Armenian National Academy of Sciences; Yerevan State University
- Thesis: Doctrine of Ottomanism in the political life of the Ottoman Empire (50s and 70s of 19th century) (1983)
- Doctoral advisor: Hovhannes Injikyan

Ruben Arami Safrastyan (Armenian: Ռուբեն Արամի Սաֆրաստյան; born 5 October 1955) is an Armenian historian and Turkologist who specializes in Turkish, Ottoman, genocide, Middle Eastern and regional studies. He is currently a professor of history and Turkish studies at Yerevan State University and a full member (Oriental Studies) of the Armenian National Academy of Sciences. He was director of the Institute of Oriental Studies from 2006 to 2020. He has also served as a counsellor of the Armenian Embassy in Germany.

Safrastyan has authored or edited more than 40 books and more than 220 articles and papers. He is also the founding editor of the academic periodicals Turkic and Ottoman Studies (since 2002) and Contemporary Eurasia (2012-2020), as well as editor of the academic yearbook Countries and Peoples of the Near and Middle East (Yerevan, Armenia). Since 2021, he has served as the Counselor of the Director of the Institute of Oriental Studies at the Armenian National Academy of Sciences.

== Biography ==
Ruben Safrastyan was born on 5 October 1955 in Yerevan. He is the grandson of noted Armenian Turkologist and educator Aram Safrastyan. In 1977, he graduated from the Faculty of Oriental Studies of Yerevan State University. From 1978 to 1980, he conducted his graduate studies on world history and Turkish history at the Institute of Oriental Studies of the Armenian National Academy of Sciences. In 1999, he won the Humboldt Prize and conducted research for a year at Ruhr University Bochum in Germany. In 2001, he received a Fulbright Fellowship and conducted for a year at the University of California, Berkeley. The next year, he received a fellowship to conduct research for a year at the Central European University in Budapest. He received the degree of Doctor of Historical Sciences in 2009. He became a corresponding member of the Armenian National Academy of Sciences in 2010 and a full member in 2014.

Safrastyan's honorary international activities include membership on the International Board of World Security Network Foundation, N.Y. (USA). He is also Senior Fellow at New Westminster College, Vancouver (Canada), and Senior Analyst at Wikistrat Inc, Washington, D.C. (USA). Safrastyan is a Member of Public Council of Armenia and Chairman of the Commission of Religion, Diaspora, and International Integration. For his professional achievements, Safrastyan has received several state awards, most notably the Movses Khorenatsi Medal, Armenia's highest cultural award.

Safrastyan is a fan of the English Premier League football club Arsenal.
