= Türkmən, Barda =

Türkmən
- Municipality
- Location within Azerbaijan Location within Karabakh Economic Region
- Coordinates: 40°22′36″N 47°08′46″E
- Country: Azerbaijan
- Rayon: Barda

Population
  - Total: 1,241
- Time zone: UTC+4 (AZT)
  - Summer (DST): UTC+5 (AZT)

Türkmən (also, Tyurkman and Tyurkmen) is a village and municipality in the Barda Rayon of Azerbaijan. It has a population of 1,241.
