= Ahlamerestaq-e Shomali Rural District =

Rural district in Mazandaran province, Iran

Ahlamerestaq-e Shomali Rural District Persian: دهستان اهلمرستاق شمالی
- Rural District
- Location within Iran
- Coordinates: 36°35′N 52°14′E
- Country: Iran
- Province: Mazandaran
- County: Mahmudabad
- District: Central
- Established: 1995
- Capital: Azademun

Population (2016)
  - Total: 10,363
- Time zone: UTC+3:30 (IRST)

Ahlamerestaq-e Shomali Rural District (Persian: دهستان اهلمرستاق شمالی) is in the Central District of Mahmudabad County, Mazandaran province, Iran. Its capital is the village of Azademun.

== Demographics ==
=== Population ===
At the time of the 2006 National Census, the rural district's population was 9,927 in 2,592 households. There were 10,269 inhabitants in 3,052 households at the following census of 2011. The 2016 census measured the population of the rural district as 10,363 in 3,444 households. The most populous of its 10 villages was Khesht Sar, with 2,656 people.

=== Other villages in the rural district ===
- Ahlam
- Borjandeh
- Bundeh
- Sharafti
- Shurestaq
- Tej Kenar
- Yusefabad
