= Ahlamerestaq-e Jonubi Rural District =

Rural district in Mazandaran province, Iran

Ahlamerestaq-e Jonubi Rural District Persian: دهستان اهلمرستاق جنوبی
- Rural District
- Location within Iran
- Coordinates: 36°35′N 52°18′E
- Country: Iran
- Province: Mazandaran
- County: Mahmudabad
- District: Central
- Established: 1987
- Capital: Kolu Deh

Population (2016)
  - Total: 15,531
- Time zone: UTC+3:30 (IRST)

Ahlamerestaq-e Jonubi Rural District (Persian: دهستان اهلمرستاق جنوبی) (Note: Formerly Ahlamerestaq Rural District (دهستان اهلمرستاق)) is in the Central District of Mahmudabad County, Mazandaran province, Iran. Its capital is the village of Kolu Deh.

== Demographics ==
=== Population ===
At the time of the 2006 National Census, the rural district's population was 15,089 in 3,867 households. There were 15,835 inhabitants in 4,710 households at the following census of 2011. The 2016 census measured the population of the rural district as 15,531 in 5,173 households. The most populous of its 26 villages was Tarsiab, with 1,773 people.

=== Other villages in the rural district ===
- Ahangar Kola
- Baudeh-ye Olya
- Baudeh-ye Sofla
- Bulideh
- Eshqabad
- Eslamabad
- Galesh Pol
- Geleyerd
- Gilapey
- Hasanabad
- Juni Kola
- Kahlu Kaj
- Karchak-e Larijani
- Karchak-e Navai
- Khvordun Kola
- Mir Alamdeh
- Naserabad
- Qassab Koti
- Sang-e Koti
- Shumia
- Siar Kola
- Tashbandan
- Telaram
- Zangi Kola
