= Aram Grigoryan (politician) =

Armenian politician (born 1977)

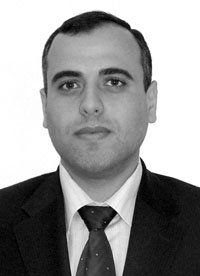
- Արամ Գրիգորյան
- Born: September 27, 1977 (age 48); Stepanakert, Nagorno-Karabakh Autonomous Oblast, Azerbaijan SSR
- Known for: Minister of Health
- Children: one

Aram Grigoryan (born September 27, 1977) is a former Deputy Minister of Health of the Nagorno-Karabakh Republic and member of the Azat Hayrenik political party.

== Life ==
Aram Grigoryan was born on September 27, 1977, in the city of Stepanakert. He began medical studies at Artsakh State University in 1993. After serving from 1993 to 1995, he served in the NKR Defense Army. He studied at Yerevan State Medical University, graduating in 1999.

Elected directly, electoral district N4

He is a member of the “Azat Hayrenik” Party and part of the “Hayrenik” Faction (10.06.2010).

In 2002 he graduated from YSMU Clinical Ordinatura General Surgery. He continued his education in 2004 where he graduated from Artsakh State University, Faculty of Economics.

In 2003 he graduated from "Armenia" Republic Medical Center (Republic Hospital) as an endoscopist. Thereafter, he served as a surgeon and endoscopist at Nagorno-Karabakh Republic Hospital.

In 2008-2009 he was appointed as deputy minister of NKR Ministry of Health.

On May 23, 2010, he was elected deputy of the National Assembly of NKR of the fifth convocation of the electoral district N4.

On June 10, 2010, he became a member of the Standing Committee on Social Affairs and took over the Social and Health Affairs since 2012.

Grigoryan is married and has one child.
