= Aram Safrastyan =

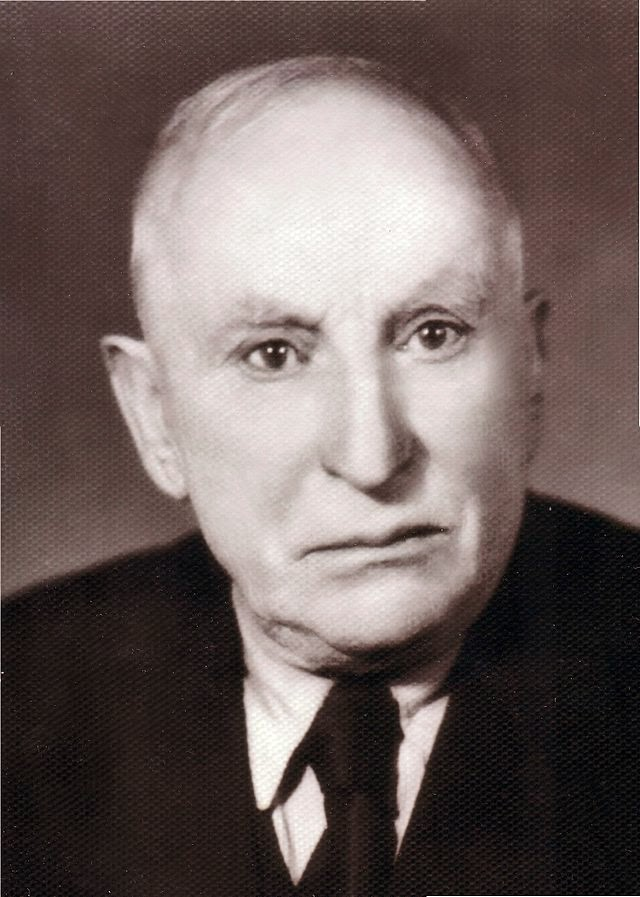
- Born: 1888; Van, Western Armenia, Ottoman Empire
- Died: 1966 (aged 77–78); Yerevan, Armenian SSR, Soviet Union
- Citizenship: Ottoman Empire; Democratic Republic of Armenia; Soviet Union
- Known for: Translation of medieval Turkish sources

Academic background
- Education: Istanbul University; Tbilisi State University; Armenian Academy of Sciences

Academic work
- Discipline: History, Turkish studies
- Institutions: Galatasaray lyceum; South Caucasus Communist University; Tbilisi State University; Institute of Caucasian studies; Armenian Academy of Sciences

Aram Khachaturi Safrastyan (Armenian: Արամ Խաչատուրի Սաֆրաստյան; 14 July 1888 – 12 July 1966) was an Armenian orientalist and Turkologist. He was a fellow of the Institute of History and the Institute of Oriental Studies of the Academy of Sciences of the Armenian SSR.

== Biography ==
Aram Safrastyan was born in 1888 in the Aygestan neighborhood of Van, Ottoman Empire to the family of a teacher. He studied at the Secondary Central School of Aygestan, after which he worked as a teacher at the Haynkuyser School of Van, and then at schools in Aghtamar Monastery, Bayazet and Şebinkarahisar. In 1911, he left for Constantinople and was admitted to the Faculty of Humanities of the Higher Pedagogical Institute, which soon merged with the faculty of the same name of Istanbul University. In 1915, after graduating from university with honors, Safrastyan went to work as a teacher at the Galatasaray College in the Pera district of Constantinople, where he taught from 1915 to 1917. Safrastyan joined the Armenian Revolutionary Federation in his youth and was the head of the ARF party organization in Constantinople at one point after World War I.

In September 1919, Safrastyan and his family were forced to flee to Armenia. He was elected to the parliament of the First Republic of Armenia as a representative from Western Armenia. Safrastyan moved to Tiflis (Tbilisi) in 1920.

In the 1920s, Safrastyan contributed to the creation of the Latin-based Azerbaijani alphabet created to replace the Arabic script theretofore used. He also contributed to the Azerbaijani-language newspapers Yeni Yol and Dan Yıldız published in Tbilisi. In 1926, Safrastyan participated in the All-Union Turkological Congress convened in Baku as a deputy of from the Georgian SSR. Safrastyan was arrested during the Great Purge and imprisoned from 1937 to 1939. He was later exiled to Siberia and remained there from 1949 to 1955. After returning from exile, he moved to Yerevan, capital of the Armenian SSR. He died there in 1966. Safrastyan's grandson Ruben is also a noted Armenian Turkologist.

== Sources ==
- Sahakyan, Ṛ. (1963). "Avagaguyn tʻurkʻagetě" [The most senior Turkologist]. HSSṚ GA Teghekagir Hasarakakan Gitutʻyunneri = Bulletin of the Academy of Sciences of the Armenian SSR: Social Sciences (8): 117–120.
