= Torkaman, West Azerbaijan =

Village in West Azerbaijan province, Iran

Torkaman Persian: تركمان
- Village
- Location within Iran
- Coordinates: 37°26′23″N 45°12′44″E
- Country: Iran
- Province: West Azerbaijan
- County: Urmia
- District: Central
- Rural District: Torkaman

Population (2016)
  - Total: 123
- Time zone: UTC+3:30 (IRST)

Torkaman (Persian: تركمان) (Note: Also romanized as Torkamān) is a village in, and the capital of, Torkaman Rural District in the Central District of Urmia County, West Azerbaijan province, Iran.

== Demographics ==
=== Population ===
At the time of the 2006 National Census, the village's population was 171 in 40 households. The following census in 2011 counted 394 people in 117 households. The 2016 census measured the population of the village as 123 people in 38 households.
