= Aramean (disambiguation) =

Aramean may refer to:

- Aramean language, a subgroup of Northwest Semitic languages
- Arameans, an ancient Semitic people of the Near East
- Aramean identity, modern communities identifying as Arameans
- Aramean alphabet, a consonantal script (abjad) used by the ancient Arameans, which influenced Hebrew, Arabic and other scripts
- Aramean kings, rulers of Aramean city-states during the Iron Age

== See also ==
- Aram (disambiguation)
- Aramaic (disambiguation)
