= Aram (actress) =

Iranian actress

Aram (

Persian: آرام, full name: Azam Mirhabibi, اعظم میرحبیبی; born 1953) is an Iranian film actress. she began her career in Iran starring in the film Gorg-e bizar and went on to star in the film Aghaye jahel.

Her breakthrough role was in the 1978 film Hokm-e tir as Behjat.

== Filmography ==
- Hokm-e tir
- Death in the Rain
- The Sleeping Lion
- Dust-Dwellers
- Koose-ye jonoob
- Gorg-e bizar
- Zabih
- Torkaman (1974)
- Aghaye jahel
- Sobh-e khakestar
- Gharatgaran
- Palang dar shab
- Hayoola
- Fryad-e eshgh
- Ranandeh ejbari
- Tirandaz
- Aloodeh
- Baba Khaldar
- Bezan berim dozdi
- Khoshgela Avazi Gereftin
