= Aram Pachyan =

Armenian writer

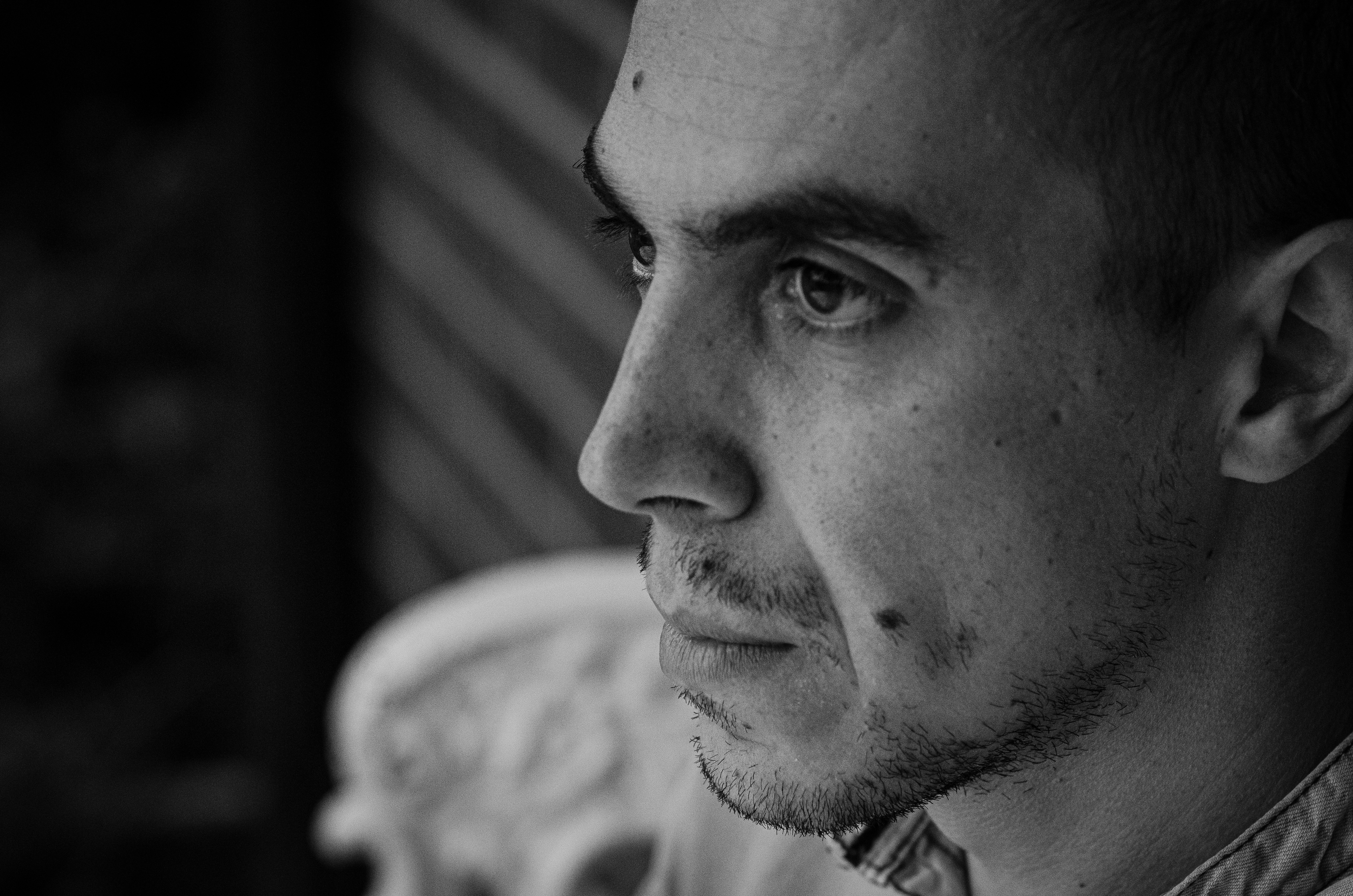
- Born: March 19, 1983 (age 43); Kirovakan, Armenian SSR, Soviet Union (now Vanadzor, Armenia)
- Occupation: Writer

Aram Pachyan (real name Sevak Hakobi Tamamyan; born March 19, 1983) is an Armenian writer. He is considered one of the most prominent representatives of the post-Soviet generation of Armenian authors. In 2021, he won the EU Prize for Literature for his book P/F, becoming the first Armenian author to receive the honor. Pachyan's work is noted for its fragmentary, stream of consciousness style and difficult subject matter. His books have been published in several languages, including English.

== Early life ==
Aram Pachyan was born on March 19, 1983, in Vanadzor, into a family of medical workers. His father is a renowned surgeon Hakob Ghukas Tamamyan, who in 1988-1994, as a volunteer and on duty, traveled throughout Armenia and Nagorno Karabakh, treating soldiers and civilians Pachyan credits his family for instilling a love of literature in him from a young age citing Robinson Crusoe by Daniel Dafoe as one of the most influential books in his youth, particularly due to its themes surrounding isolation. The novel later inspired the title of his first collection of short stories, Robinson. Pachyan received a degree in law from the Yerevan State University but soon became disillusioned with the prospects of working as a lawyer in Armenia. He began to write stories shortly after being discharged from the Armenian military, inspired by the things he experienced and witnessed during his mandatory service. He cited Fyodor Dostoevsky, Thomas Bernhard, Susan Sontag and James Joyce among his favorite authors.

== Career ==
In 2010 Pachyan published his first collection of short stories, titled Robinson and 13 stories In 2009, before the publication of the entire collection, he received the Presidential youth prize for literature for several stories that were already published at that point. A second Armenian edition of the book was published in 2019. The collection was published in English by Glagoslav Publications in 2020, translated by Nazareth Seferian, Nairi Hakhverdi, Arevik Ashkharoyan, Nyree Abrahamian, and Lusine Mueller. The stories touch on topics such as masculinity, childhood trauma, loneliness and alcoholism.

In 2012 he published his first novel, Goodbye Bird, a reedited and extended second edition of the novel in Armenian was published in 2017. The following year it was published in English by Glagoslav Publications, translated by Nairi Hakhverdi. Goodbye, Bird is centered around the memories of a 28 year old man who was discharged from the army. The novel has been adapted for the stage two times: a play based on the novel, titled I Am a Vegetarian premiered in Yerevan in 2015, the work was also adapted into an English language opera, which premiered in Munchen in 2021.

In 2014, Pachyan published his second collection of short stories and essays, Ocean, A second edition was released in 2020. A story from the collection, titled Remembering the reader was translated to English and published in University of Michigan's literary magazine Absinthe.

In 2020 Pachyan published his second novel, P/F. The novel is a fragmentary experimental work touching on the past and present of Yerevan. Before the novel was published, on February 22, 2015, within the framework of "DILIJAN CHAMBER MUSIC", the work "Pachyan Fragments" written for vocals, violin and percussion by Swiss-based composer Aram Hovhannisyan was performed at the "Zipper Hall" in Los Angeles, USA. In 2021, the novel won the EU Prize for Literature.

In 2023, Pachyan published a prose collection titled "If This is a Writer".

Between 2013-2020, Pachyan worked as a columnist in the Hraparak newspaper.

== Reception ==
Literary scholar and editor Arqmenik Nikoghosyan praised Pachyan's work, spotlighting the first three of the writer's books in his radio show High Literature with Arqmenik Nikoghosyan.

Fellow author Grig called Robinson one of the best works of contemporary literature.
