= Torkaman (film) =

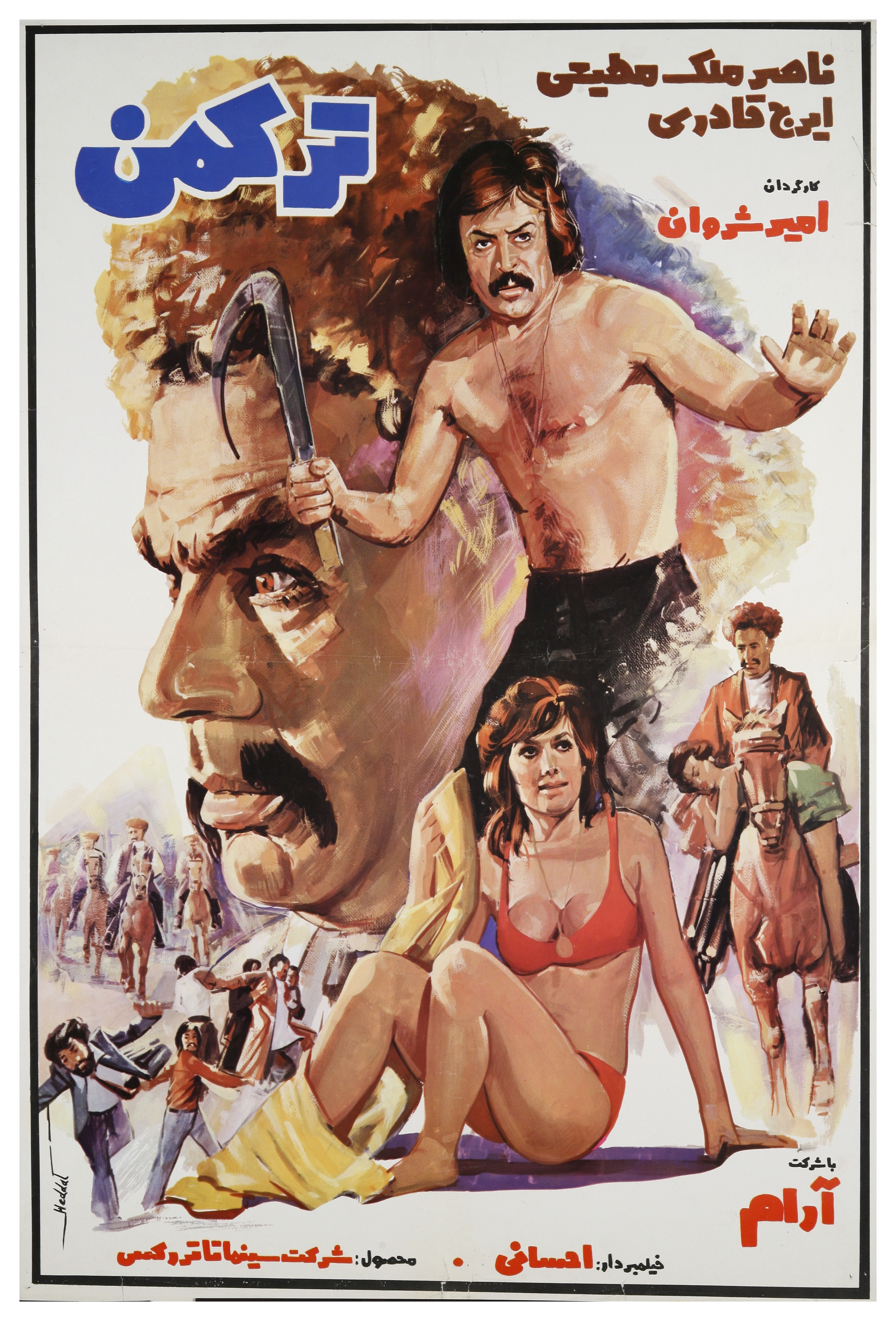
- Directed by: Amir Shervan
- Written by: Saeid Motalebi
- Produced by: Mohammad Taghi Shokraei
- Starring: Naser Malek Motiee; Iraj Ghaderi; Azam Mirhosseini (Aram); Abolfazl Mirzaei; Nariman Shirifard; Rafi Madadkar; Majid Mozafari
- Music by: Hossein Vaseghi; Roubic Mansouri
- Release date: 1974
- Running time: 101 minutes
- Country: Iran
- Language: Persian

Torkaman (Persian: ترکمن Torkaman, English: Turkmen) is a 1974 Iranian Persian-genre romance film directed by Amir Shervan and starring Naser Malek Motiee, Iraj Ghaderi, Azam Mirhosseini, Abolfazl Mirzaei, Nariman Shirifard, Rafi Madadkar and Majid Mozafari.
