= Aramaic (disambiguation) =

Aramaic is a Semitic language.

Aramaic may also refer to:

- Aramaic alphabet, adapted from the Phoenician alphabet and became distinctive from it by the 8th century BCE
- Aramaic studies, an academic discipline that studies Aramaic languages and cultural heritage

== See also ==
- Aramean (disambiguation)
- Syriac (disambiguation)
