= Torkaman Rural District =

Rural district in West Azerbaijan province, Iran

Torkaman Rural District Persian: دهستان تركمان
- Rural District
- Location within Iran
- Coordinates: 37°26′N 45°16′E
- Country: Iran
- Province: West Azerbaijan
- County: Urmia
- District: Central
- Established: 1987
- Capital: Torkaman

Population (2016)
  - Total: 10,017
- Time zone: UTC+3:30 (IRST)

Torkaman Rural District (Persian: دهستان تركمان) is in the Central District of Urmia County, West Azerbaijan province, Iran. Its capital is the village of Torkaman.

== Demographics ==
=== Population ===
At the time of the 2006 National Census, the rural district's population was 10,069 in 2,629 households. There were 9,893 inhabitants in 2,900 households at the following census of 2011. The 2016 census measured the population of the rural district as 10,017 in 3,088 households. The most populous of its 49 villages was Babarud, with 634 people.

=== Other villages in the rural district ===
- Darbarud
- Naybin
- Ordushahi
- Sardrud
- Tbbat
- Tappeh Torkaman
