= Mahmudabad County =

County in Mazandaran province, Iran

Mahmudabad County Persian: شهرستان محمودآباد
- County
- Location of Mahmudabad County in Mazandaran province (top center, yellow)

- Location of Mazandaran province in Iran
- Coordinates: 36°36′N 52°19′E
- Country: Iran
- Province: Mazandaran
- Established: 1995
- Capital: Mahmudabad
- Districts: Central, Sorkhrud

Area
  - Total: 262.80 km^{2} (101.47 sq mi)

Population (2016)
  - Total: 98,407
  - Density: 374.46/km^{2} (969.84/sq mi)
- Time zone: UTC+3:30 (IRST)

Mahmudabad County (Persian: شهرستان محمودآباد) is in Mazandaran province, Iran. Its capital is the city of Mahmudabad.

== Demographics ==
=== Population ===
At the time of the 2006 National Census, the county's population was 90,054 in 24,135 households. The following census in 2011 counted 96,019 people in 28,957 households. The 2016 census measured the population of the county as 98,407 in 32,810 households.

=== Administrative divisions ===
Mahmudabad County's population history and administrative structure over three consecutive censuses are shown in the following table.

Mahmudabad County Population
Administrative Divisions	2006	2011	2016
Central District	59,397	64,783	65,767
Ahlamerestaq-e Jonubi RD (Note: Formerly Ahlamerestaq Rural District)	15,089	15,835	15,531
Ahlamerestaq-e Shomali RD	9,927	10,269	10,363
Harazpey-ye Gharbi RD	6,820	6,908	8,029
Mahmudabad (city)	27,561	31,771	31,844
Sorkhrud District	30,657	31,236	32,640
Dabuy-ye Shomali RD	7,745	8,110	9,015
Harazpey-ye Shomali RD	16,343	17,205	16,926
Sorkhrud (city)	6,569	5,921	6,699
Total	90,054	96,019	98,407
RD = Rural District

== See also ==
Media related to Mahmudabad County at Wikimedia Commons
