= Central District (Mahmudabad County) =

District in Mazandaran province, Iran

Central District (Mahmudabad County) Persian: بخش مرکزی شهرستان محمودآباد
- District
- Location within Iran
- Coordinates: 36°36′N 52°16′E
- Country: Iran
- Province: Mazandaran
- County: Mahmudabad
- Established: 1995
- Capital: Mahmudabad

Population (2016)
  - Total: 65,767
- Time zone: UTC+3:30 (IRST)

The Central District of Mahmudabad County (Persian: بخش مرکزی شهرستان محمودآباد) is in Mazandaran province, Iran. Its capital is the city of Mahmudabad.

== Demographics ==
=== Population ===
At the time of the 2006 National Census, the district's population was 59,397 in 15,737 households. The following census in 2011 counted 64,783 people in 19,347 households. The 2016 census measured the population of the district as 65,767 inhabitants in 21,643 households.

=== Administrative divisions ===
Central District (Mahmudabad County) Population
Administrative Divisions	2006	2011	2016
Ahlamerestaq-e Jonubi RD (Note: Formerly Ahlamerestaq Rural District)	15,089	15,835	15,531
Ahlamerestaq-e Shomali RD	9,927	10,269	10,363
Harazpey-ye Gharbi RD	6,820	6,908	8,029
Mahmudabad (city)	27,561	31,771	31,844
Total	59,397	64,783	65,767
RD = Rural District
