= Darvishabad, Mazandaran =

Darvishabad درويش آباد
- Village
- Location within Iran
- Coordinates: 36°40′23″N 52°25′30″E
- Country: Iran
- Province: Mazandaran
- County: Mahmudabad
- Bakhsh: Sorkhrud
- Rural District: Dabuy-ye Shomali

Population (2016)
  - Total: 300
- Time zone: UTC+3:30 (IRST)

Darvishabad (Persian: درويش آباد, also Romanized as Darvīshābād) is a village in Dabuy-ye Shomali Rural District, Sorkhrud District, Mahmudabad County, Mazandaran Province, Iran. It is a western suburb of Sorkhrud city, near the Caspian Sea and west of Chaksar village.

== Population ==
At the time of the 2006 National Census, the village's population was 242 in 69 households. The following census in 2011 counted 196 people in 63 households. The 2016 census measured the population of the village as 300 people in 100 households.
