= URT =

Urt or URT may refer to:

== Places ==
- United Republic of Tanzania, an East African country (UNDP code: URT)
- Urt, France
  - Gare d'Urt, a railway station
- Urt, Iran
- Surat Thani Airport, Thailand

== Sport ==
- União Recreativa dos Trabalhadores, a Brazilian association football club
- Unión de Rugby de Tucumán, an Argentine rugby governing body

== Other uses ==
- Union Refrigerator Transit Line, a defunct American railroad
- The UnReal Times, an Indian satire portal (2011–2016)
- Upper respiratory tract, in biology and medicine
- Urat language, spoken in Papua New Guinea (ISO 639-3:urt)
- Urban rail transit
