= Ahmadabad-e Kalij =

Ahmadabad-e Kalij (Persian: احمدابادكليج), also rendered as Ahmadabad-e Kalich, may refer to:

- Ahmadabad-e Kalij-e Olya
- Ahmadabad-e Kalij-e Sofla
