= Mirdeh =

Mirdeh (Persian: ميرده) may refer to:

- Mirdeh-ye Olya
- Mirdeh-ye Sofla

== See also ==
- Mir Deh
- Mir Deh Rural District
