= Asadollahabad =

Asadollahabad or Asdollahabad (Persian: اسداله اباد) may refer to:

- Asadollahabad, Khuzestan
- Asdollahabad, Mazandaran
