= Bisheh Kola, Mahmudabad =

Village in Mazandaran province, Iran

Bisheh Kola Persian: بيشه كلا
- Village
- Location within Iran
- Coordinates: 36°38′55″N 52°21′26″E
- Country: Iran
- Province: Mazandaran
- County: Mahmudabad
- District: Sorkhrud
- Rural District: Harazpey-ye Shomali

Population (2016)
  - Total: 1,904
- Time zone: UTC+3:30 (IRST)

Bisheh Kola (Persian: بيشه كلا) (Note: Also romanized as Bīsheh Kalā and Bīsheh Kolā) is a village in, and the capital of, Harazpey-ye Shomali Rural District in Sorkhrud District of Mahmudabad County, Mazandaran province, Iran.

== Demographics ==
=== Population ===
At the time of the 2006 National Census, the village's population was 1,781 in 492 households. The following census in 2011 counted 1,888 people in 570 households. The 2016 census measured the population of the village as 1,904 people in 648 households.
