= Chaksar =

Village in Mazandaran province, Iran

Chaksar Persian: چاک سر
- Village
- Location within Iran
- Coordinates: 36°40′15″N 52°25′47″E
- Country: Iran
- Province: Mazandaran
- County: Mahmudabad
- District: Sorkhrud
- Rural District: Dabuy-ye Shomali

Population (2016)
  - Total: 682
- Time zone: UTC+3:30 (IRST)

Chaksar (Persian: چاک سر) (Note: Also romanized as Chāksar) is a village in Dabuy-ye Shomali Rural District of Sorkhrud District, Mahmudabad County, Mazandaran province, Iran. It is a western suburb of Sorkhrud city, near the Caspian Sea.

== Demographics ==
=== Population ===
At the time of the 2006 National Census, the village's population was 518 in 139 households. The following census in 2011 counted 496 people in 155 households. The 2016 census measured the population of the village as 682 people in 243 households.
