= Tazehabad, Mahmudabad =

Tazehabad تازه آباد
- Village
- Location within Iran
- Coordinates: 36°34′47″N 52°23′27″E
- Country: Iran
- Province: Mazandaran
- County: Mahmudabad
- Bakhsh: Sorkhrud
- Rural District: Harazpey-ye Shomali

Population (2016)
  - Total: 368
- Time zone: UTC+3:30 (IRST)

Tazehabad (Persian: تازه اباد, also Romanized as Tāzehābād) is a village in Harazpey-ye Shomali Rural District, Sorkhrud District, Mahmudabad County, Mazandaran Province, Iran.

At the time of the 2006 National Census, the village's population was 447 in 119 households. The following census in 2011 counted 390 people in 117 households. The 2016 census measured the population of the village as 368 people in 133 households.
