= Chahar Afra =

Chahar Afra چهارافرا
- Village
- Location within Iran
- Coordinates: 36°37′00″N 52°20′34″E
- Country: Iran
- Province: Mazandaran
- County: Mahmudabad
- Bakhsh: Sorkhrud
- Rural District: Harazpey-ye Shomali

Population (2016)
  - Total: 346
- Time zone: UTC+3:30 (IRST)

Chahar Afra (Persian: چهارافرا, also Romanized as Chahār Afrā) is a village in Harazpey-ye Shomali Rural District, Sorkhrud District, Mahmudabad County, Mazandaran Province, Iran.

At the time of the 2006 National Census, the village's population was 326 in 82 households. The following census in 2011 counted 307 people in 96 households. The 2016 census measured the population of the village as 346 people in 129 households.
