= 1949 New York City brewery strike =

American labor strike

- Date: April 1 – June 21, 1949 (2 months, 2 weeks and 6 days)
- Location: New York City, New York, United States
- Goals: Addition of another worker on all delivery trucks; Increased wages; Shorter workweek
- Methods: Picketing; Strike action
- Result: Union and companies agree to compromise deal; Other national brewers gain a foothold in the New York City market

Parties
Brewery Workers	Brewers Board of Trade

The 1949 New York City brewery strike was a labor strike involving approximately 7,000 brewery workers from New York City. The strike began on April 1 of that year after a labor contract between 7 local unions of the Brewery Workers Union and the Brewers Board of Trade (which collectively represented 14 city-based brewing companies) expired without a replacement. The primary issue was over the number of workers on board delivery trucks, with the union wanting two workers per truck as opposed to the companies' standard one person per truck. Additional issues regarded higher wages and reduced working hours for the union members, among other minor issues.

The strike saw production at the New York City-based breweries immediately halted, and a beer shortage in the city soon began. Beer from outside the city, including New Jersey and the Midwest, was soon shipped in as the strike continued for several weeks. During the strike, three of the breweries resumed production after agreeing to independent deals with their workers, while the Brewery Workers Union was joined by two other local unions. On June 21, the strike ended with the workers and companies agreeing to a new labor contract that addressed many of the workers' concerns.

The strike had an immediate economic impact on the New York City-based breweries, costing the companies approximately $75 million in gross sales. The strike and subsequent lack of local beer also allowed other American brands to gain a foothold in the New York City market, and local brewers increased their advertising to stay competitive. By 1952, there were only 4 local breweries left in the city, which at one time was one of the major brewing center of the United States.

== Background ==
=== Brewing in New York City ===
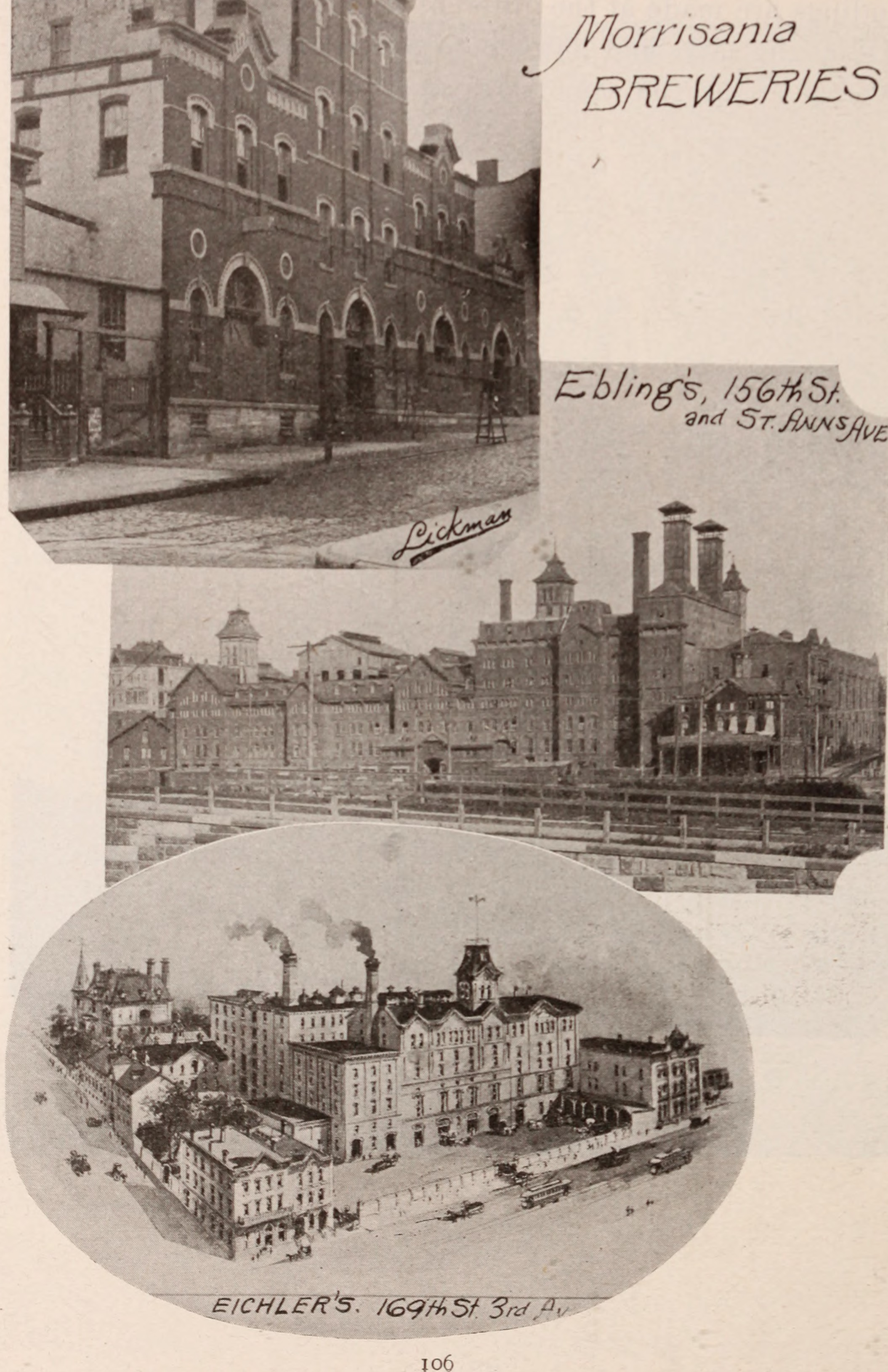
Image from an 1897 book showing several breweries in the Bronx. The Ebling Brewing Company is shown in the middle.

New York City historically was a major center of beer production in the United States. In 1898, the borough of Brooklyn was home to 48 breweries, and during their height, two of the largest Brooklyn-based brewing companies (the F. & M. Schaefer Brewing Company and S. Liebmann & Sons) both annually produced over 2 million barrels of beer. In 1949, approximately 7,000 brewery workers in the city were members of the United Brewery, Flour, Cereal and Soft Drink Workers Union (also simply known as the Brewery Workers Union), an affiliate union of the Congress of Industrial Organizations. According to a union representative, the workers represented included all levels of workers except salesmen and white-collar workers. These union members, organized into 7 different local unions, worked for 14 major brewing companies in the city and were collectively part of a labor contract between the union and the Brewers Board of Trade, of which the brewing companies were members. These companies included the 10 following breweries:

- Burke
- Ebling
- Edelbrew
- Liebmann
- Metropolis
- Piel Brothers
- Rubsam & Horrmann
- Ruppert
- Schaefer
- Trommer

Additionally, four distributors for the companies Anheuser-Busch, Ballantine, Schlitz, and West End were a part of this board. Many of these companies were located in Brooklyn.

=== Labor contract disputes ===
The contract between the union and companies was set to expire at midnight on March 31 of that year, and in the month leading up to that, representatives from both sides met in several rounds of negotiations to discuss the contents of a new deal. However, these talks were bogged down, as the two sides could not agree to the provisions of the contract. In particular, union officials were pushing for an $8.50 weekly raise to the base $71 weekly pay. Workers also wanted a five-hour reduction to their 40-hour work weeks, the addition of an extra man on delivery trucks operated by only one person, and a pension plan. Additional points of contention concerned job security and workplace safety. According to union counsel Paul O'Dwyer (brother to then-New York City Mayor William O'Dwyer), the main issue concerning the union members was that "there are too many injuries because the men are forced to move the machines too fast and to handle excessive weights without aid on delivery". O'Dwyer also claimed that 20 brewery workers had been killed on the job in New York City over the previous four years and that injuries and workplace hazards had increased. However, a representative of the brewers objected to these claims, arguing that the brewery workers had a good safety record. Additionally, he alleged that the $8.50 raise was unrealistic and that the union had not submitted a counterproposal to the Brewers Board's $2 per week raise counteroffer.

On March 25, union members voted on whether or not to perform a strike action sometime after April 1 if a contract were not agreed to by then. Additionally, on March 27, union members voted by acclamation to request approval from the union's international officials to call a strike after the contract expired. Following this, a vote to approve strike action was held in a closed meeting on March 31. As the expiration date loomed, company and union officials continued to meet and discuss contract proposals, and immediately prior to the contract's expiration, the two parties had been engaged in a 12-hour long Federal mediation session which still failed to achieve a new deal. The strike action would be the second in 5 months for the New York City brewers, as the union led a 29-day strike in October and November 1948 after several delivery drivers were suspended and fired for not meeting company-imposed delivery schedules. As no deal had been reached by the current deal's expiration, the strike commenced at 2:05 a.m. on April 1, 1949.

== Course of the strike ==
=== Initial picketing ===
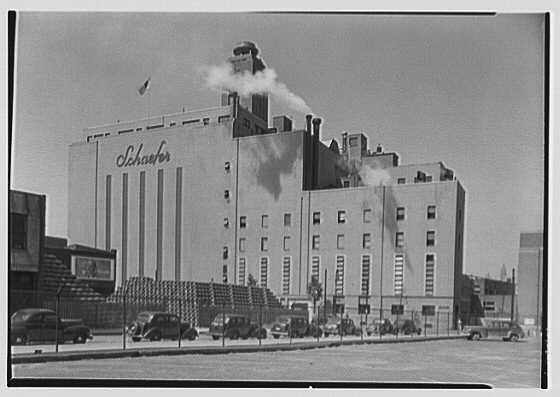
Plant for the F. & M. Schaefer Brewing Company in Brooklyn, 1941

Picketing commenced on the first day of the strike, with approximately 50 strikers picketing outside Schaefer's plant and an equal number at the Liebmann brewery (the producers of Rheingold Beer). Several strikers also picketed at the Edelbrew Brewery and the George Ehret Brewery. Representatives of both Liebmann and Edelbrew announced they would not be shipping out their products that day, and police were informed to be alert for any disturbances at the city's breweries. In total, production at all 14 breweries was shut down. That same day, approximately 3,000 brewery workers in nearby New Jersey, organized under the American Federation of Labor (AFL), were also threatening strike action after their contract had expired the same day, similarly without a replacement agreement between them and five major breweries in the state. On April 2, the Brooklyn Eagle reported that a beer shortage could be expected in New York City within 10 days. Union officials argued that this number was closer to a week, while company representatives claimed it would be two weeks before a shortage. That same day, the New Jersey Brewers Association, during negotiations with the New Jersey union (Bottled Beer Drivers and Beer Bottlers Local 843) agreed to grant them the same terms as any agreement reached between the New York City union and brewers association. As a result, strike action in New Jersey was postponed.

On April 3, strikers stationed at the Holland Tunnel and George Washington Bridge talked to beer truck delivery drivers coming into the city from New Jersey and convinced them to turn around, honoring their strike. That same day, shop stewards and the executive boards for the 7 local unions in New York voted to allow beer distribution in the city only if there were two people on each truck, that their work weeks consisted of 35 hours, and that they weren't transporting beer from any of the breweries affected by the strike. On April 4, union and company representatives met in Manhattan as part of negotiations overseen by the Federal Mediation and Conciliation Services. While the negotiations did not lead to an agreement between the Board of Trade and the union, a separate agreement was made the following day with 200 unionized workers at the Ebling Brewing Company in the Bronx. As part of the agreement, Ebling agreed to the 35 hour work week and the two workers per truck rule and further agreed to incorporate any further agreements made between the union and board. A news article published after the agreement stated that 6,750 brewery workers in the city remained on strike.

=== Out-of-state deliveries begin ===
Federal discussions resumed on April 6. On April 7, Brewery Workers officials announced that they would cease picketing at the Holland Tunnel and George Washington Bridge and allow trucks from the P. Ballantine and Sons Brewing Company (described by the union as New York brewers' "largest competitor") to deliver beer into New York City. However, brewers from New Jersey withheld shipping their beer to New York City, claiming fears of possible violence or strike action if they did. Several days later, the Brewery Workers Union offered to provide escorts for the New Jersey delivery drivers and alleged that the brewers' decision to not ship beer into the city was part of a national union busting ploy on the part of the brewing companies. O'Dwyer even went so far as to call out the United States Brewers Foundation and accuse them of monopolistic practices, which the brewers denied. Around this same time, strikers were involved in an altercation in Brooklyn during a picket when they attempted to prevent the unloading of beer shipped into the city from Harrisburg, Pennsylvania. Along with Pennsylvania, some bars in the city were shipping in beer from areas such as Connecticut and upstate New York.

On April 9, it was reported that over 200 bars were empty of beer, with restaurant leaders in the city claiming that up to 40% of establishments could be without beer by the middle of that week. On April 11 and 12, the union and brewers met again with Federal mediators and again could not reach an agreement. Several days later on April 14, the New Jersey brewers reneged on their decision and began to ship beer into the city. It's estimated that on that day, 10,000 barrels of beer were shipped into the city, over three times the average amount. That night, strikers held a rally at St. Nicholas Arena where they announced that the strike would continue as the union rejected the brewers' $3 weekly raise proposal. Additionally, it was announced that 400 members of the International Association of Machinists (IAM), a national independent union, would also begin a work stoppage against the 13 breweries. On April 16, the Edelbrew Brewery in Brooklyn announced that they had come to an agreement with the 250 workers at that plant, reducing the number of brewers involved in the strike to 12. The agreement reached with the company included the two person per truck rule and a 35-hour week. The following day, Metropolis Brewery became the third brewery to sign a back-to-work agreement with their workers.

On April 26, Schaefer announced that, due to the strike, they would be temporarily closing all their buildings for the duration of the work stoppage. This move affected about 100 clerical workers at the company. By this time, the AFL's International Union of Operating Engineers (IUOE) had joined the Brewery Workers and IAM in striking against the 11 breweries. The following day, Liebmann announced they would also be closing, affecting a similar number of clerical workers as at Schaefer. In both cases, the clerical workers were furloughed with pay. In addition to the IUOE, another AFL union, the Firemen and Oilers Union Local 56, would also join the strike by its end.

=== Agreement reached ===
On May 23, the New Jersey brewers came to an agreement on a new labor contract with the brewery workers in that state. As part of the agreement, the workers received a wage increase that would be retroactive from April 1, while working hours, holidays, and bargaining rights remained the same. The next day, the New York City brewery workers rejected an offer that was similar to the New Jersey deal, which would have seen hourly wage increases of between $0.35 to $0.40, a $175 bonus, a 40-hour week, and other benefits. On June 2, the Brooklyn Eagle reported that brewery workers on strike accounted for nearly half of the increase in the number of people in the city applying for unemployment benefits. The strike at this point had been ongoing for 8 weeks, the required waiting period for striking workers to file for unemployment. However, by June 4, it was reported that a deal was close to being reached between company and union representatives, with a meeting held that night at the Commodore Hotel aimed at settling small disagreements. Among the settlements, the brewers announced that the two people per truck rule would be adopted at all breweries. Despite this, talks continued on through the week. However, by June 11, a tentative agreement had been made between CIO and the Brewers Board of Trade. Provisions of the agreement included a 37.5-hour work week, a base weekly pay raise of $2, and eight paid holidays, among other benefits. In addition, two people would be on delivery trucks if it is "operationally feasible" for the individual breweries. Following the agreement, it was submitted for a ratification vote by union members. However, on June 14 it was reported that union members had voted to reject the proposal, with one local reporting that 92% of voters were opposed. With this, union members elected to continue the strike for their original demands, which included an $8.50 weekly raise and the assurance of two men per truck. The Brewer Board of Trade did not immediately comment on the rejection, instead saying they would "study the significance of their rejection". Following the rejection, the brewers announced on June 15 that they would no longer be making any concessions to the strikers, who they alleged were solely responsible for the $40 million in lost sales they had experienced at that point due to the strike.

In the days after the rejection, union and company officials again continued to meet in negotiations, and a new agreement was drafted that was submitted by vote to the union members. On June 21, with over 90% voting in favor, the union announced an end to the strike. The terms of the agreement maintained the $2 weekly raise and 37.5-hour workweek, but broadened the scope of the two men per truck rule to include approximately 96% of all delivery trucks. Additionally, the workers were guaranteed a pension plan and, according to the Brooklyn Eagle, "the maximum union security allowed under the law". With the agreement in place, workers returned to the breweries the following day, with beer shipments resuming on June 23.

== Aftermath ==
The strike had an immediate impact on the brewing industry in New York City. In terms of direct financial damage, it is estimated that the strike caused $75 million loss in gross sales for the local companies. Additionally, the lack of local beer during the months of May and June (when, usually, New York City-based breweries would produce approximately 31,000,000 US gallons (120,000,000 L) of beer) allowed brewers from the Midwest to gain a foothold in the city. Brands such as Blatz and Budweiser became popular, and that year, Wisconsin overtook New York as the leading beer-producing state in the country. In an effort to compete against these new brands, many of the local companies significantly increased their advertising budget.

One New York City-based brewery that was especially hurt by the strike was Trommer's. During the strike, the company's unique strain of yeast died, and afterwards, the company started using a new strain, which fans of the brand said changed the flavor. By 1951, the company had been sold to Piel's, and the company's Brooklyn brewery was shut down in 1955. By 1952, only four breweries remained in New York City. As late as 1960, however, approximately 10% of all beer produced in the United States was still being made in New York City. By 1976 though, both Schaefer and Liebmann (the last two breweries in Brooklyn) closed their remaining facilities.
