= Dabuy =

Dabuy (Persian: دابوئ) may refer to:

- Dabuy-ye Jonubi Rural District
- Dabuy-ye Shomali Rural District
