= Valam-e Olya =

Valam-e Olya ولم عليا
- Village
- Location within Iran
- Coordinates: 36°33′47″N 52°23′03″E
- Country: Iran
- Province: Mazandaran
- County: Mahmudabad
- Bakhsh: Sorkhrud
- Rural District: Harazpey-ye Shomali

Population (2016)
  - Total: 282
- Time zone: UTC+3:30 (IRST)

Valam-e Olya (Persian: ولم عليا, also Romanized as Valam-e ‘Olyā; also known as Valam and Valam-e Bālā) is a village in Harazpey-ye Shomali Rural District, Sorkhrud District, Mahmudabad County, Mazandaran Province, Iran.

At the time of the 2006 National Census, the village's population was 285 in 72 households. The following census in 2011 counted 269 people in 85 households. The 2016 census measured the population of the village as 282 people in 94 households.
