= Hajji Kola-ye Bala =

Hajji Kola-ye Bala (Persian: حاجي كلا بالا) may refer to:

- Hajji Kola-ye Bala, Babol
- Hajji Kola-ye Bala, Mahmudabad
