= Zangi Kola-ye Olya =

Village in Mazandaran province, Iran

Zangi Kola-ye Olya Persian: زنگی كلا عليا
- Village
- Location within Iran
- Coordinates: 36°38′20″N 52°25′07″E
- Country: Iran
- Province: Mazandaran
- County: Mahmudabad
- District: Sorkhrud
- Rural District: Dabuy-ye Shomali

Population (2016)
  - Total: 1,583
- Time zone: UTC+3:30 (IRST)

Zangi Kola-ye Olya (Persian: زنگی كلا عليا) (Note: Also romanized as Zangī Kolā-ye ‘Olyā; also known as Zangī Kolā-ye Bālā) is a village in Dabuy-ye Shomali Rural District of Sorkhrud District, Mahmudabad County, Mazandaran province, Iran.

== Demographics ==
=== Population ===
At the time of the 2006 National Census, the village's population was 1,336 in 357 households. The following census in 2011 counted 1,498 people in 474 households. The 2016 census measured the population of the village as 1,583 people in 538 households, the most populous in its rural district.
