= Alavi Kola-ye Mir =

Village in Mazandaran province, Iran

Alavi Kola-ye Mir Persian: علويكلامير
- Village
- Location within Iran
- Coordinates: 36°35′47″N 52°24′50″E
- Country: Iran
- Province: Mazandaran
- County: Mahmudabad
- District: Sorkhrud
- Rural District: Dabuy-ye Shomali

Population (2016)
  - Total: 711
- Time zone: UTC+3:30 (IRST)

Alavi Kola-ye Mir (Persian: علويكلامير) (Note: Also romanized as ‘Alāvī Kolā-ye Mīr; also known as ‘Alāvī Kolā and ‘Alavī Kolā) is a village in Dabuy-ye Shomali Rural District of Sorkhrud District, Mahmudabad County, Mazandaran province, Iran.

== Demographics ==
=== Population ===
At the time of the 2006 National Census, the village's population was 719 in 182 households. The following census in 2011 counted 705 people in 210 households. The 2016 census measured the population of the village as 711 people in 236 households.
