= Zard Ab, Mazandaran =

Village in Mazandaran province, Iran

Zard Ab Persian: زرداب
- Village
- Location within Iran
- Coordinates: 36°36′19″N 52°23′49″E
- Country: Iran
- Province: Mazandaran
- County: Mahmudabad
- District: Sorkhrud
- Rural District: Harazpey-ye Shomali

Population (2016)
  - Total: 1,071
- Time zone: UTC+3:30 (IRST)

Zard Ab (Persian: زرداب) (Note: Also romanized as Zard Āb) is a village in Harazpey-ye Shomali Rural District of Sorkhrud District in Mahmudabad County, Mazandaran province, Iran.

== Demographics ==
=== Population ===
At the time of the 2006 National Census, the village's population was 1,073 in 307 households. The following census in 2011 counted 1,213 people in 374 households. The 2016 census measured the population of the village as 1,071 people in 401 households.
