= Alamdeh-e Sharqi =

Alamdeh-e Sharqi علمده شرقی
- Village
- Location within Iran
- Coordinates: 36°38′52″N 52°22′28″E
- Country: Iran
- Province: Mazandaran
- County: Mahmudabad
- Bakhsh: Sorkhrud
- Rural District: Harazpey-ye Shomali

Population (2016)
  - Total: 375
- Time zone: UTC+3:30 (IRST)

Alamdeh-e Sharqi (Persian: علمده شرقی, also Romanized as ‘Alamdeh-e Sharqī, lit. 'East Alamdeh') is a village in Harazpey-ye Shomali Rural District, Sorkhrud District, Mahmudabad County, Mazandaran Province, Iran.

At the time of the 2006 National Census, the village's population was 322 in 88 households. The following census in 2011 counted 375 people in 111 households. The 2016 census measured the population of the village as 375 people in 132 households.
