= Afratakht, Mahmudabad =

Afratakht افراتخت
- Village
- Location within Iran
- Coordinates: 36°34′31″N 52°22′02″E
- Country: Iran
- Province: Mazandaran
- County: Mahmudabad
- Bakhsh: Sorkhrud
- Rural District: Harazpey-ye Shomali

Population (2016)
  - Total: 184
- Time zone: UTC+3:30 (IRST)

Afratakht (Persian: افراتخت, also Romanized as Afrātakht) is a village in Harazpey-ye Shomali Rural District, Sorkhrud District, Mahmudabad County, Mazandaran Province, Iran.

At the time of the 2006 National Census, the village's population was 168 in 46 households. The following census in 2011 counted 177 people in 59 households. The 2016 census measured the population of the village as 184 people in 64 households.
