= Moallem Kola, Mahmudabad =

Village in Mazandaran province, Iran

Moallem Kola Persian: معلم كلا
- Village
- Location within Iran
- Coordinates: 36°37′52″N 52°23′02″E
- Country: Iran
- Province: Mazandaran
- County: Mahmudabad
- District: Sorkhrud
- Rural District: Harazpey-ye Shomali

Population (2016)
  - Total: 2,416
- Time zone: UTC+3:30 (IRST)

Moallem Kola (Persian: معلم كلا) (Note: Also romanized as Mo‘allem Kalā and Mo‘allem Kolā) is a village in Harazpey-ye Shomali Rural District of Sorkhrud District in Mahmudabad County, Mazandaran province, Iran.

== Demographics ==
=== Population ===
At the time of the 2006 National Census, the village's population was 2,448 in 652 households. The following census in 2011 counted 2,626 people in 810 households. The 2016 census measured the population of the village as 2,416 people in 879 households.
