= Darya Sar, Mazandaran =

Darya Sar درياسر
- Village
- Location within Iran
- Coordinates: 36°38′46″N 52°20′26″E
- Country: Iran
- Province: Mazandaran
- County: Mahmudabad
- Bakhsh: Sorkhrud
- Rural District: Harazpey-ye Shomali

Population (2016)
  - Total: 318
- Time zone: UTC+3:30 (IRST)

Darya Sar (Persian: درياسر, also Romanized as Daryā Sar) is a village in Harazpey-ye Shomali Rural District, Sorkhrud District, Mahmudabad County, Mazandaran Province, Iran.

Elevation is more than 2,000 meters above sea level and is enclosed between four mountains. From the southwest, Mount Alamut is the tallest mountain that surrounds this plain.

At the time of the 2006 National Census, the village's population was 337 in 92 households. The following census in 2011 counted 321 people in 95 households. The 2016 census measured the population of the village as 318 people in 107 households.
