= Abdollahabad, Mahmudabad =

Village in Mazandaran province, Iran

Abdollahabad Persian: عبداله آباد
- Village
- Location within Iran
- Coordinates: 36°35′16″N 52°22′56″E
- Country: Iran
- Province: Mazandaran
- County: Mahmudabad
- District: Sorkhrud
- Rural District: Harazpey-ye Shomali

Population (2016)
  - Total: 1,444
- Time zone: UTC+3:30 (IRST)

Abdollahabad (Persian: عبداله آباد) (Note: Also romanized as ‘Abdollāhābād) is a village in Harazpey-ye Shomali Rural District of Sorkhrud District in Mahmudabad County, Mazandaran province, Iran.

== Demographics ==
=== Population ===
At the time of the 2006 National Census, the village's population was 1,365 in 373 households. The following census in 2011 counted 1,463 people in 449 households. The 2016 census measured the population of the village as 1,444 people in 518 households.
