= Ezzatabad, Mazandaran =

Ezzatabad عزت آباد
- Village
- Location within Iran
- Coordinates: 36°39′12″N 52°22′35″E
- Country: Iran
- Province: Mazandaran
- County: Mahmudabad
- Bakhsh: Sorkhrud
- Rural District: Harazpey-ye Shomali

Population (2016)
  - Total: 421
- Time zone: UTC+3:30 (IRST)

Ezzatabad (Persian: عزت آباد, also Romanized as ‘Ezzatābād) is a village in Harazpey-ye Shomali Rural District, Sorkhrud District, Mahmudabad County, Mazandaran Province, Iran.

At the time of the 2006 National Census, the village's population was 348 in 90 households. The following census in 2011 counted 418 people in 124 households. The 2016 census measured the population of the village as 421 people in 166 households.
