= Eskandeh =

Eskandeh اسكنده
- Village
- Location within Iran
- Coordinates: 36°35′39″N 52°21′23″E
- Country: Iran
- Province: Mazandaran
- County: Mahmudabad
- Bakhsh: Sorkhrud
- Rural District: Harazpey-ye Shomali

Population (2016)
  - Total: 488
- Time zone: UTC+3:30 (IRST)

Eskandeh (Persian: اسكنده, also Romanized as Eskendeh; also known as Eshene and Iskandeh) is a village in Harazpey-ye Shomali Rural District, Sorkhrud District, Mahmudabad County, Mazandaran Province, Iran.

At the time of the 2006 National Census, the village's population was 515 in 136 households. The following census in 2011 counted 490 people in 146 households. The 2016 census measured the population of the village as 488 people in 166 households.
