= Molla Kola, Mahmudabad =

Village in Mazandaran province, Iran

Molla Kola Persian: ملاكلا
- Village
- Location within Iran
- Coordinates: 36°39′18″N 52°24′24″E
- Country: Iran
- Province: Mazandaran
- County: Mahmudabad
- District: Sorkhrud
- Rural District: Harazpey-ye Shomali

Population (2016)
  - Total: 2,523
- Time zone: UTC+3:30 (IRST)

Molla Kola (Persian: ملاكلا) (Note: Also romanized as Mollā Kolā) is a village in Harazpey-ye Shomali Rural District of Sorkhrud District in Mahmudabad County, Mazandaran province, Iran.

== Demographics ==
=== Population ===
At the time of the 2006 National Census, the village's population was 2,241 in 629 households. The following census in 2011 counted 2,391 people in 749 households. The 2016 census measured the population of the village as 2,523 people in 854 households, the most populous in its rural district.
