= Zangi Kola-ye Sofla =

Zangi Kala-ye Sofla زنگی كلا سفلی
- Village
- Location within Iran
- Coordinates: 36°38′32″N 52°25′42″E
- Country: Iran
- Province: Mazandaran
- County: Mahmudabad
- Bakhsh: Sorkhrud
- Rural District: Dabuy-ye Shomali

Population (2016)
  - Total: 385
- Time zone: UTC+3:30 (IRST)

Zangi Kola-ye Sofla (Persian: زنگی كلا سفلی, also Romanized as Zangī Kolā-ye Soflá; also known as Zangī Kalā-ye Pā’īn) is a village in Dabuy-ye Shomali Rural District, Sorkhrud District, Mahmudabad County, Mazandaran Province, Iran.

At the time of the 2006 National Census, the village's population was 303 in 86 households. The following census in 2011 counted 343 people in 114 households. The 2016 census measured the population of the village as 385 people in 127 households.
