= Alamdeh-e Gharbi =

Alamdeh-e Gharbi علمده غربی
- Village
- Location within Iran
- Coordinates: 36°38′52″N 52°22′22″E
- Country: Iran
- Province: Mazandaran
- County: Mahmudabad
- Bakhsh: Sorkhrud
- Rural District: Harazpey-ye Shomali

Population (2016)
  - Total: 405
- Time zone: UTC+3:30 (IRST)

Alamdeh-e Gharbi (Persian: علمده غربی, also Romanized as ‘Alamdeh-e Gharbī) is a village in Harazpey-ye Shomali Rural District, Sorkhrud District, Mahmudabad County, Mazandaran Province, Iran.

At the time of the 2006 National Census, the village's population was 393 in 103 households. The following census in 2011 counted 411 people in 120 households. The 2016 census measured the population of the village as 405 people in 132 households.
