= Rudposht, Mahmudabad =

Village in Mazandaran province, Iran

Rudposht Persian: رودپشت
- Village
- Location within Iran
- Coordinates: 36°38′22″N 52°20′25″E
- Country: Iran
- Province: Mazandaran
- County: Mahmudabad
- District: Sorkhrud
- Rural District: Harazpey-ye Shomali

Population (2016)
  - Total: 835
- Time zone: UTC+3:30 (IRST)

Rudposht (Persian: رودپشت) (Note: Also romanized as Rūdposht) is a village in Harazpey-ye Shomali Rural District of Sorkhrud District in Mahmudabad County, Mazandaran province, Iran.

== Demographics ==
=== Population ===
At the time of the 2006 National Census, the village's population was 829 in 231 households. The following census in 2011 counted 816 people in 246 households. The 2016 census measured the population of the village as 835 people in 287 households.
