= Vazeyak =

Vazeyak وازیک
- Village
- Location within Iran
- Coordinates: 36°35′06″N 52°21′57″E
- Country: Iran
- Province: Mazandaran
- County: Mahmudabad
- Bakhsh: Sorkhrud
- Rural District: Harazpey-ye Shomali

Population (2016)
  - Total: 464
- Time zone: UTC+3:30 (IRST)

Vazeyak (Persian: وازیک, also Romanized as Vāzeyak) is a village in Harazpey-ye Shomali Rural District, Sorkhrud District, Mahmudabad County, Mazandaran Province, Iran.

At the time of the 2006 National Census, the village's population was 504 in 131 households. The following census in 2011 counted 513 people in 155 households. The 2016 census measured the population of the village as 464 people in 154 households.
