= Siah Kola =

Siah Kola or Siyah Kala or Siah Kala or Seyah Kala (Persian: سياه كلا) may refer to:

- Siah Kola, Mahmudabad
- Siah Kola, Nur
