= Lake Street Schlitz Tied House =

Commercial building in Chicago, Illinois

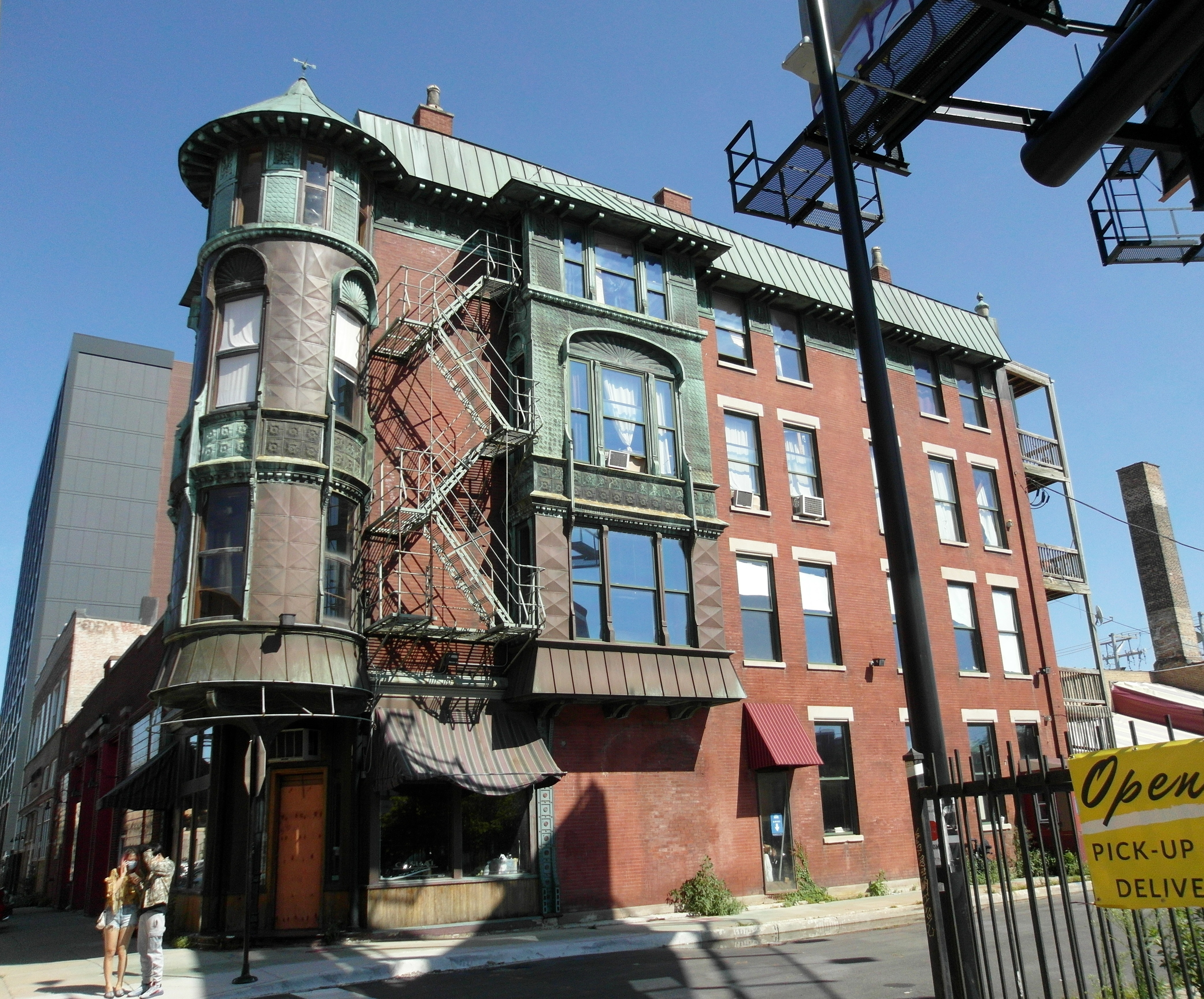
- Interactive map of the Lake Street Schlitz Tied House area
- Alternative names: La Lucé Building

General information
- Architectural style: Queen Anne
- Location: 1393 W. Lake Street, Chicago, Illinois
- Coordinates: 41°53′9.0″N 87°38′52.4″W
- Completed: 1892

Technical details
- Floor count: 4

The Lake Street Schlitz Tied House (also known as the La Lucé Building) is a four-story Queen Anne style building at 1393 W. Lake Street in Chicago's Near West Side. It is a Chicago Landmark.

== History ==
The property on which the building stands was sold to Edward Uihlein in 1891 for $4,600. The building was built by Uihlein in 1892, and originally housed a Schlitz tied house, as well as apartments. It continued to house taverns for many years after. In 1989, La Lucé, a traditional Italian restaurant, opened in the building. Michael Jordan once had an office in the building.

La Lucé closed in 2016, and a demolition permit was requested. The permit was placed on a 90-day hold, because the building is orange rated in the Chicago Historic Resources Survey, signifying that it "possesses potentially significant architectural or historical features". The 90 day hold expired, but the building was not demolished. It was sold to developers on August 7, 2020. A demolition permit was issued on November 30, 2020. However, a 90-day demolition delay hold was issued on December 2. The Commission on Chicago Landmarks unanimously adopted a preliminary landmark designation for the building on April 1, 2021. The Chicago City Council voted to designate the building a Chicago Landmark on July 21, 2021.
