= Faramdeh =

Village in Mazandaran province, Iran

Faramdeh Persian: فرامده
- Village
- Location within Iran
- Coordinates: 36°34′32″N 52°22′45″E
- Country: Iran
- Province: Mazandaran
- County: Mahmudabad
- District: Sorkhrud
- Rural District: Harazpey-ye Shomali

Population (2016)
  - Total: 550
- Time zone: UTC+3:30 (IRST)

Faramdeh (Persian: فرامده) (Note: Also romanized as Farāmdeh) is a village in Harazpey-ye Shomali Rural District of Sorkhrud District in Mahmudabad County, Mazandaran province, Iran.

== Demographics ==
=== Population ===
At the time of the 2006 National Census, the village's population was 542 in 142 households. The following census in 2011 counted 612 people in 184 households. The 2016 census measured the population of the village as 550 people in 181 households.
