= Hajji Kola-ye Sofla =

Village in Mazandaran province, Iran

Hajji Kola-ye Sofla Persian: حاجی كلا سفلی
- Village
- Location within Iran
- Coordinates: 36°39′29″N 52°25′31″E
- Country: Iran
- Province: Mazandaran
- County: Mahmudabad
- District: Sorkhrud
- Rural District: Dabuy-ye Shomali

Population (2016)
  - Total: 1,077
- Time zone: UTC+3:30 (IRST)

Hajji Kola-ye Sofla (Persian: حاجی كلا سفلی) (Note: Also romanized as Ḩājjī Kolā-ye Soflá; also known as Ḩājjī Kolā-ye Pā’īn) is a village in Dabuy-ye Shomali Rural District of Sorkhrud District, Mahmudabad County, Mazandaran province, Iran.

== Demographics ==
=== Population ===
At the time of the 2006 National Census, the village's population was 819 in 227 households. The following census in 2011 counted 961 people in 307 households. The 2016 census measured the population of the village as 1,077 people in 374 households.
