= Kolemarz-e Olya =

Kolemarz-e Olya كلمرزعليا
- Village
- Location within Iran
- Coordinates: 36°38′00″N 52°20′00″E
- Country: Iran
- Province: Mazandaran
- County: Mahmudabad
- Bakhsh: Sorkhrud
- Rural District: Harazpey-ye Shomali

Population (2016)
  - Total: 496
- Time zone: UTC+3:30 (IRST)

Kolemarz-e Olya (Persian: كلمرزعليا, also Romanized as Kolemarz-e ‘Olyā) is a village in Harazpey-ye Shomali Rural District, Sorkhrud District, Mahmudabad County, Mazandaran Province, Iran.

At the time of the 2006 National Census, the village's population was 493 in 137 households. The following census in 2011 counted 470 people in 146 households. The 2016 census measured the population of the village as 496 people in 167 households.
