= Eslam Mahalleh =

Village in Mazandaran province, Iran

Eslam Mahalleh Persian: اسلام محله
- Village
- Location within Iran
- Coordinates: 36°37′30″N 52°26′01″E
- Country: Iran
- Province: Mazandaran
- County: Mahmudabad
- District: Sorkhrud
- Rural District: Dabuy-ye Shomali

Population (2016)
  - Total: 602
- Time zone: UTC+3:30 (IRST)

Eslam Mahalleh (Persian: اسلام محله) (Note: Also romanized as Eslām Maḩalleh) is a village in Dabuy-ye Shomali Rural District of Sorkhrud District, Mahmudabad County, Mazandaran province, Iran.

== Demographics ==
=== Population ===
At the time of the 2006 National Census, the village's population was 543 in 144 households. The following census in 2011 counted 579 people in 174 households. The 2016 census measured the population of the village as 602 people in 192 households.
