= Kones-e Marz =

Kones-e Marz كنس مرز
- Village
- Location within Iran
- Coordinates: 36°34′41″N 52°24′07″E
- Country: Iran
- Province: Mazandaran
- County: Mahmudabad
- Bakhsh: Sorkhrud
- Rural District: Dabuy-ye Shomali

Population (2016)
  - Total: 344
- Time zone: UTC+3:30 (IRST)

Kones-e Marz (Persian: كنس مرز) is a village in Dabuy-ye Shomali Rural District, Sorkhrud District, Mahmudabad County, Mazandaran Province, Iran.

== Population ==
At the time of the 2006 National Census, the village's population was 347 in 86 households. The following census in 2011 counted 341 people in 100 households. The 2016 census measured the population of the village as 344 people in 122 households.
