= Gol Mahalleh, Mahmudabad =

Village in Mazandaran province, Iran

Gol Mahalleh Persian: گل محله
- Village
- Location within Iran
- Coordinates: 36°37′26″N 52°26′35″E
- Country: Iran
- Province: Mazandaran
- County: Mahmudabad
- District: Sorkhrud
- Rural District: Dabuy-ye Shomali

Population (2016)
  - Total: 557
- Time zone: UTC+3:30 (IRST)

Gol Mahalleh (Persian: گل محله) (Note: Also romanized as Gol Maḩalleh) is a village in Dabuy-ye Shomali Rural District of Sorkhrud District, Mahmudabad County, Mazandaran province, Iran.

== Demographics ==
=== Population ===
At the time of the 2006 National Census, the village's population was 543 in 160 households. The following census in 2011 counted 543 people in 176 households. The 2016 census measured the population of the village as 557 people in 194 households.
