= Afra Sara =

Afra Sara افراسرا
- Village
- Location within Iran
- Coordinates: 36°38′00″N 52°26′00″E
- Country: Iran
- Province: Mazandaran
- County: Mahmudabad
- Bakhsh: Sorkhrud
- Rural District: Dabuy-ye Shomali

Population (2016)
  - Total: 295
- Time zone: UTC+3:30 (IRST)

Afra Sara (Persian: افراسرا, also Romanized as Afrā Sarā) is a village in Dabuy-ye Shomali Rural District, Sorkhrud District, Mahmudabad County, Mazandaran Province, Iran.

== Population ==
At the time of the 2006 National Census, the village's population was 292 in 80 households. The following census in 2011 counted 277 people in 83 households. The 2016 census measured the population of the village as 295 people in 101 households.
