= Kalusa, Iran =

Kalusa كلوسا
- Village
- Location within Iran
- Coordinates: 36°33′50″N 52°22′25″E
- Country: Iran
- Province: Mazandaran
- County: Mahmudabad
- Bakhsh: Sorkhrud
- Rural District: Harazpey-ye Shomali

Population (2016)
  - Total: 183
- Time zone: UTC+3:30 (IRST)

Kalusa (Persian: كلوسا, also Romanized as Kalūsā; also known as Kaluso) is a village in Harazpey-ye Shomali Rural District, Sorkhrud District, Mahmudabad County, Mazandaran Province, Iran.

At the time of the 2006 National Census, the village's population was 208 in 51 households. The following census in 2011 counted 191 people in 54 households. The 2016 census measured the population of the village as 183 people in 57 households.
