= Aliabad, Mahmudabad =

Village in Mazandaran province, Iran

Aliabad Persian: علی آباد
- Village
- Location within Iran
- Coordinates: 36°36′46″N 52°22′02″E
- Country: Iran
- Province: Mazandaran
- County: Mahmudabad
- District: Sorkhrud
- Rural District: Harazpey-ye Shomali

Population (2016)
  - Total: 709
- Time zone: UTC+3:30 (IRST)

Aliabad (Persian: علی آباد) (Note: Also romanized as ‘Alīābād) is a village in Harazpey-ye Shomali Rural District of Sorkhrud District in Mahmudabad County, Mazandaran province, Iran.

== Demographics ==
=== Population ===
At the time of the 2006 National Census, the village's population was 709 in 200 households. The following census in 2011 counted 734 people in 243 households. The 2016 census measured the population of the village as 709 people in 237 households.
