= Abu ol Hasanabad, Mahmudabad =

Abu ol Hasanabad ابوالحسن آباد
- Village
- Location within Iran
- Coordinates: 36°37′04″N 52°23′54″E
- Country: Iran
- Province: Mazandaran
- County: Mahmudabad
- Bakhsh: Sorkhrud
- Rural District: Harazpey-ye Shomali

Population (2016)
  - Total: 291
- Time zone: UTC+3:30 (IRST)

Abu ol Hasanabad (Persian: ابوالحسن آباد, also Romanized as Abū ol Ḩasanābād) is a village in Harazpey-ye Shomali Rural District, Sorkhrud District, Mahmudabad County, Mazandaran Province, Iran.

At the time of the 2006 National Census, the village's population was 262 in 74 households. The following census in 2011 counted 253 people in 83 households. The 2016 census measured the population of the village as 291 people in 106 households.
