= Sirjarun =

Sirjaron سيرجارون
- Village
- Location within Iran
- Coordinates: 36°36′29″N 52°26′20″E
- Country: Iran
- Province: Mazandaran
- County: Mahmudabad
- Bakhsh: Sorkhrud
- Rural District: Dabuy-ye Shomali

Population (2016)
  - Total: 488
- Time zone: UTC+3:30 (IRST)
- Area code: 0114485
- Website: http://sirjaron.ir

Sirjaron (Persian: سيرجارون, also Romanized as Sīrjāron) is a village in Dabuy-ye Shomali Rural District, Sorkhrud District, Mahmudabad County, Mazandaran Province, Iran.

== Population ==
At the time of the 2006 National Census, the village's population was 450 in 118 households. The following census in 2011 counted 460 people in 137 households. The 2016 census measured the population of the village as 488 people in 149 households.
