= Harazpey-ye Shomali Rural District =

Rural district in Mazandaran province, Iran

Harazpey-ye Shomali Rural District Persian: دهستان هرازپی شمالی
- Rural District
- Location within Iran
- Coordinates: 36°37′N 52°22′E
- Country: Iran
- Province: Mazandaran
- County: Mahmudabad
- District: Sorkhrud
- Established: 1987
- Capital: Bisheh Kola

Population (2016)
  - Total: 16,926
- Time zone: UTC+3:30 (IRST)

Harazpey-ye Shomali Rural District (Persian: دهستان هرازپی شمالی) is in Sorkhrud District of Mahmudabad County, Mazandaran province, Iran. Its capital is the village of Bisheh Kola.

== Demographics ==
=== Population ===
At the time of the 2006 National Census, the rural district's population was 16,343 in 4,445 households. There were 17,205 inhabitants in 5,260 households at the following census of 2011. The 2016 census measured the population of the rural district as 16,926 in 5,874 households. The most populous of its 26 villages was Molla Kola, with 2,523 people.

=== Other villages in the rural district ===
- Abdollahabad
- Abu ol Hasanabad
- Afratakht
- Alamdeh-e Gharbi
- Alamdeh-e Sharqi
- Aliabad
- Asdollahabad
- Chahar Afra
- Darya Sar
- Eskandeh
- Ezzatabad
- Faramdeh
- Kalusa
- Kolemarz-e Olya
- Moallem Kola
- Mojtama'e Maskuni Khaneh Darya
- Rudposht
- Siah Kola
- Tazehabad
- Urteh Dasht
- Valam-e Olya
- Vazeyak
- Zard Ab
