= Hajji Kola-ye Olya =

Village in Mazandaran province, Iran

Hajji Kola-ye Olya Persian: حاجی كلا عليا
- Village
- Location within Iran
- Coordinates: 36°39′04″N 52°25′08″E
- Country: Iran
- Province: Mazandaran
- County: Mahmudabad
- District: Sorkhrud
- Rural District: Dabuy-ye Shomali

Population (2016)
  - Total: 546
- Time zone: UTC+3:30 (IRST)

Hajji Kola-ye Olya (Persian: حاجی كلا عليا) (Note: Also romanized as Ḩājjī Kolā-ye ‘Olyā; also known as Ḩājjī Kolā-ye Bālā) is a village in Dabuy-ye Shomali Rural District of Sorkhrud District, Mahmudabad County, Mazandaran province, Iran.

== Demographics ==
=== Population ===
At the time of the 2006 National Census, the village's population was 440 in 126 households. The following census in 2011 counted 433 people in 139 households. The 2016 census measured the population of the village as 546 people in 190 households.
