= Mirdeh-ye Olya =

Mirdeh-ye Olya ميرده عليا
- Village
- Location within Iran
- Coordinates: 36°34′14″N 52°24′24″E
- Country: Iran
- Province: Mazandaran
- County: Mahmudabad
- Bakhsh: Sorkhrud
- Rural District: Dabuy-ye Shomali

Population (2016)
  - Total: 257
- Time zone: UTC+3:30 (IRST)

Mirdeh-ye Olya (Persian: ميرده عليا, also Romanized as Mīrdeh-ye ‘Olyā) is a village in Dabuy-ye Shomali Rural District, Sorkhrud District, Mahmudabad County, Mazandaran Province, Iran.

== Population ==
At the time of the 2006 National Census, the village's population was 148 in 42 households. The following census in 2011 counted 146 people in 40 households. The 2016 census measured the population of the village as 257 people in 88 households.
