= Urteh Dasht =

Urteh Dasht اورطه دشت
- Village
- Location within Iran
- Coordinates: 36°34′12″N 52°22′22″E
- Country: Iran
- Province: Mazandaran
- County: Mahmudabad
- Bakhsh: Sorkhrud
- Rural District: Harazpey-ye Shomali

Population (2016)
  - Total: 375
- Time zone: UTC+3:30 (IRST)

Urteh Dasht (Persian: اورطه دشت, also Romanized as Ūrţeh Dasht; also known as ‘Ūr Dasht, ‘Ūrţ, and ‘Ūrţasht) is a village in Harazpey-ye Shomali Rural District, Sorkhrud District, Mahmudabad County, Mazandaran Province, Iran.

At the time of the 2006 National Census, the village's population was 336 in 88 households. The following census in 2011 counted 376 people in 117 households. The 2016 census measured the population of the village as 375 people in 119 households.
