= 1981 Schlitz strike =

Union organized job action in Milwaukee, Wisconsin

- Date: June 1 – September 30, 1981 (Note: End date is the date the plant closed.) (3 months, 4 weeks and 1 day)
- Location: Milwaukee, Wisconsin, United States
- Goals: Increased pay; Improved benefits
- Methods: Strike action; Picketing
- Result: Schlitz closes its Milwaukee plant and is later acquired by Stroh Brewery Company

Parties
Brewery Workers Local 9	Joseph Schlitz Brewing Company

The 1981 Schlitz strike was a labor strike involving approximately 700 brewery workers of the Joseph Schlitz Brewing Company plant in Milwaukee, Wisconsin, United States. The strike began June 1, 1981 after the labor contract between Schlitz and the local union (Brewery Workers Local 9) expired without a replacement. The strike came at a time when the company was still recovering from financial difficulties it had sustained in the years prior. After almost two months of striking, the company announced that it would be closing its Milwaukee brewery in an effort to stay competitive and reduce excess production capacity. The plant closed on September 30, and Schlitz was acquired by the Stroh Brewery Company the following year.

== Background ==
In 1981, the Milwaukee-based Joseph Schlitz Brewing Company was the fourth largest brewing company in the United States. Several years prior, the company was the second largest, with sales peaking in 1976. However, in the years following, the company's market share and overall sales declined, due in part to a change in their beer formula and a nationwide ad campaign which were both poorly received. Additionally, the company had been involved in antitrust action with the Federal government. In 1981, the company was also experiencing a potential issue with organized labor. That year, members of the Brewery Workers Local 9, who represented approximately 700 workers at the company's Milwaukee plant, (Note: Sources vary on the exact number, with sources claiming approximately 700, 720, and 750,) announced they would go on strike if the company and union hadn't come to an agreement regarding new labor contracts by midnight on May 31, when the current contracts were set to expire. According to union representatives, the benefits and wages at the plant were about half what the union had achieved at the Pabst Brewing Company and Miller Brewing Company, both also based in Milwaukee. At the time, the United Press International (UPI) was reporting that some industry experts thought a walkout at the plant could actually help Schlitz to save money and be more competitive. At the time, the Milwaukee plant was the oldest and least efficient plant operated by Schlitz, and the company at the time was operating its facilities at approximately 50% production capacity. UPI also reported speculation that Schlitz would close the plant. On June 1, the local union went on strike, with picketing commencing that day.

== Strike action and aftermath ==
The strike began on June 1, 1981. The strike continued through June and into late July, at which time The New York Times reported that Schlitz was discussing being bought out by the G. Heileman Brewing Company of La Crosse, Wisconsin. On July 31, Schlitz reported that the Milwaukee plant would permanently close on September 30 of that year. In discussing the rationale behind the closure, Schlitz chief executive officer Frank J. Sellinger stated that the company was carrying excessive production capacity and that the closure would help them to stay competitive. Schlitz would still be headquartered in Milwaukee and would continue to operate a container plant in nearby Oak Creek, Wisconsin. After several striking employees took an early retirement, there were still an estimated 700 strikers who would be directly affected by the closure. At the time of the announcement, the company and union were still in discussions regarding a new contract. Additionally, it was reported that Pabst had submitted a competing offer to acquire the company.

In October, U.S. Assistant Attorney General William Baxter stated that the United States Department of Justice Antitrust Division would file an antitrust suit against Heileman if they attempted to carry out the acquisition, which was subsequently dropped. In 1982, Schlitz was acquired by the Stroh Brewery Company. Schlitz was eventually acquired by Pabst from Stroh in 1999.

== See also ==
- 1953 Milwaukee brewery strike
- Beer in Milwaukee
