= Asdollahabad, Mazandaran =

Asdollahabad اسداله آباد
- Village
- Location within Iran
- Coordinates: 36°36′02″N 52°21′54″E
- Country: Iran
- Province: Mazandaran
- County: Mahmudabad
- Bakhsh: Sorkhrud
- Rural District: Harazpey-ye Shomali

Population (2016)
  - Total: 99
- Time zone: UTC+3:30 (IRST)

Asdollahabad (Persian: اسداله آباد, also Romanized as Asdollāhābād) is a village in Harazpey-ye Shomali Rural District, Sorkhrud District, Mahmudabad County, Mazandaran Province, Iran.

At the time of the 2006 National Census, the village's population was 125 in 33 households. The following census in 2011 counted 101 people in 34 households. The 2016 census measured the population of the village as 99 people in 33 households.
