= Ahmadabad-e Kalij-e Olya =

Ahmadabad-e Kalij-e Olya احمدآباد كليج عليا
- Village
- Location within Iran
- Coordinates: 36°37′00″N 52°25′00″E
- Country: Iran
- Province: Mazandaran
- County: Mahmudabad
- Bakhsh: Sorkhrud
- Rural District: Dabuy-ye Shomali

Population (2016)
  - Total: 443
- Time zone: UTC+3:30 (IRST)

Ahmadabad-e Kalij-e Olya (Persian: احمد آباد کلیج عليا, also Romanized as Aḩmadābād-e Kalīj-e ‘Olyā; also known as Aḩmadābād-e Kalīch) is a village in Dabuy-ye Shomali Rural District, Sorkhrud District, Mahmudabad County, Mazandaran Province, Iran.

== Population ==
At the time of the 2006 National Census, the village's population was 435 in 126 households. The following census in 2011 counted 470 people in 148 households. The 2016 census measured the population of the village as 443 people in 149 households.
