= Siah Kola, Mahmudabad =

Siah Kola سياه كلا
- Village
- Location within Iran
- Coordinates: 36°39′07″N 52°23′15″E
- Country: Iran
- Province: Mazandaran
- County: Mahmudabad
- Bakhsh: Sorkhrud
- Rural District: Harazpey-ye Shomali

Population (2016)
  - Total: 236
- Time zone: UTC+3:30 (IRST)

Siah Kola (Persian: سياه كلا, also Romanized as Sīāh Kolā and Sīyah Kalā) is a village in Harazpey-ye Shomali Rural District, Sorkhrud District, Mahmudabad County, Mazandaran Province, Iran.

At the time of the 2006 National Census, the village's population was 233 in 65 households. The following census in 2011 counted 232 people in 67 households. The 2016 census measured the population of the village as 236 people in 82 households.
