= Mirdeh-ye Sofla =

Mirdeh-ye Sofla ميرده سفلی
- Village
- Location within Iran
- Coordinates: 36°34′29″N 52°24′40″E
- Country: Iran
- Province: Mazandaran
- County: Mahmudabad
- Bakhsh: Sorkhrud
- Rural District: Dabuy-ye Shomali

Population (2016)
  - Total: 207
- Time zone: UTC+3:30 (IRST)

Mirdeh-ye Sofla (Persian: ميرده سفلی, also Romanized as Mīrdeh-ye Soflá) is a village in Dabuy-ye Shomali Rural District, Sorkhrud District, Mahmudabad County, Mazandaran Province, Iran.

== Population ==
At the time of the 2006 National Census, the village's population was 170 in 50 households. The following census in 2011 counted 163 people in 54 households. The 2016 census measured the population of the village as 207 people in 72 households.
