= Ahmadabad-e Kalij-e Sofla =

Village in Mazandaran province, Iran

Ahmadabad-e Kalij-e Sofla Persian: احمد اباد كليج سفلي
- Village
- Location within Iran
- Coordinates: 36°36′47″N 52°25′09″E
- Country: Iran
- Province: Mazandaran
- County: Mahmudabad
- District: Sorkhrud
- Rural District: Dabuy-ye Shomali

Population (2016)
  - Total: 538
- Time zone: UTC+3:30 (IRST)

Ahmadabad-e Kalij-e Sofla (Persian: احمد اباد كليج سفلي) (Note: Also romanized as Aḩmadābād-e Kalīj-e Soflá; also known as Aḩmadābād-e Kalīch) is a village in Dabuy-ye Shomali Rural District of Sorkhrud District, Mahmudabad County, Mazandaran province, Iran.

== Demographics ==
=== Population ===
At the time of the 2006 National Census, the village's population was 448 in 120 households. The following census in 2011 counted 498 people in 151 households. The 2016 census measured the population of the village as 538 people in 170 households.
