= Ebling Brewing Company =

Historical American company

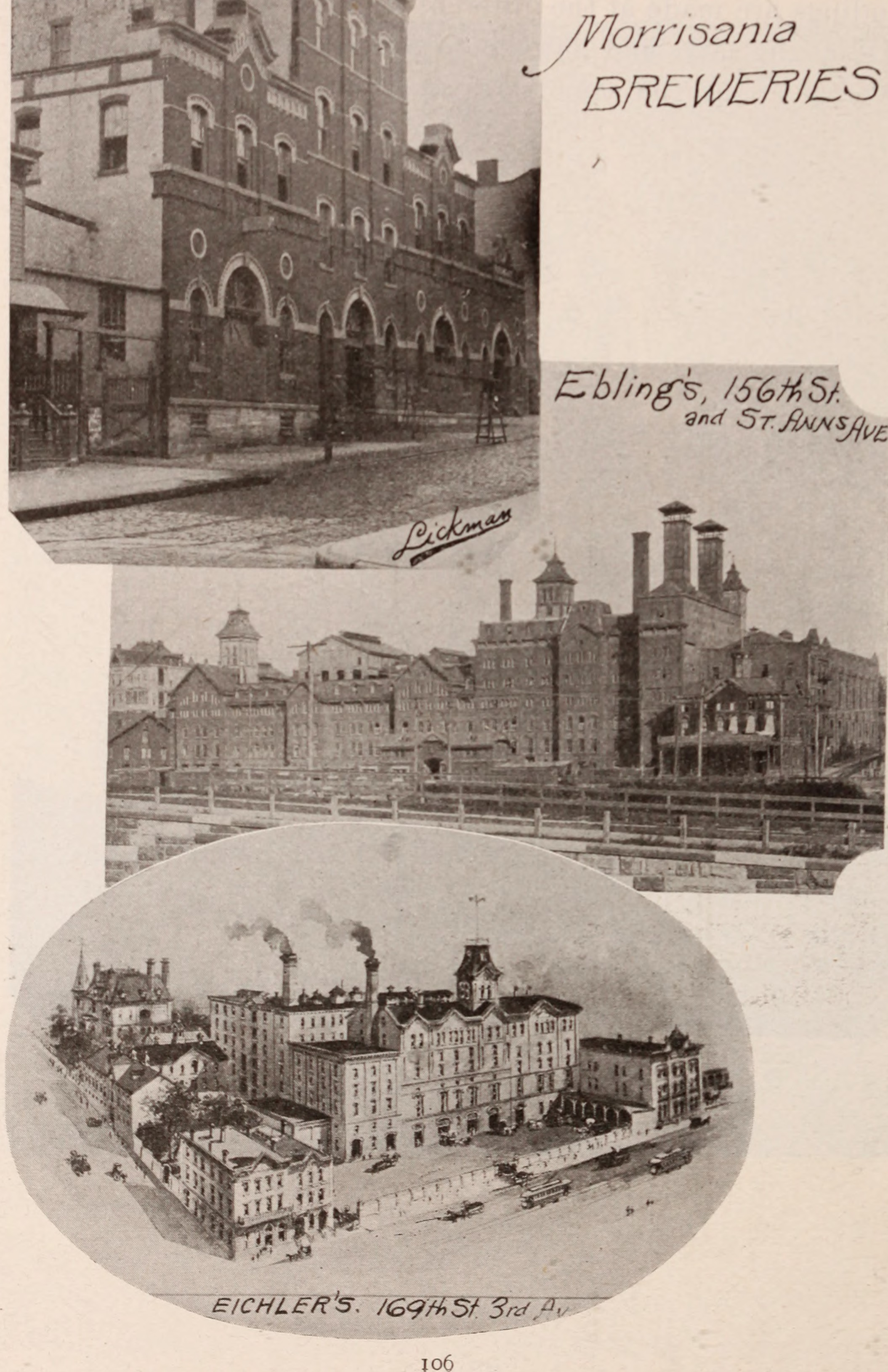
Three breweries in the Bronx (1897)

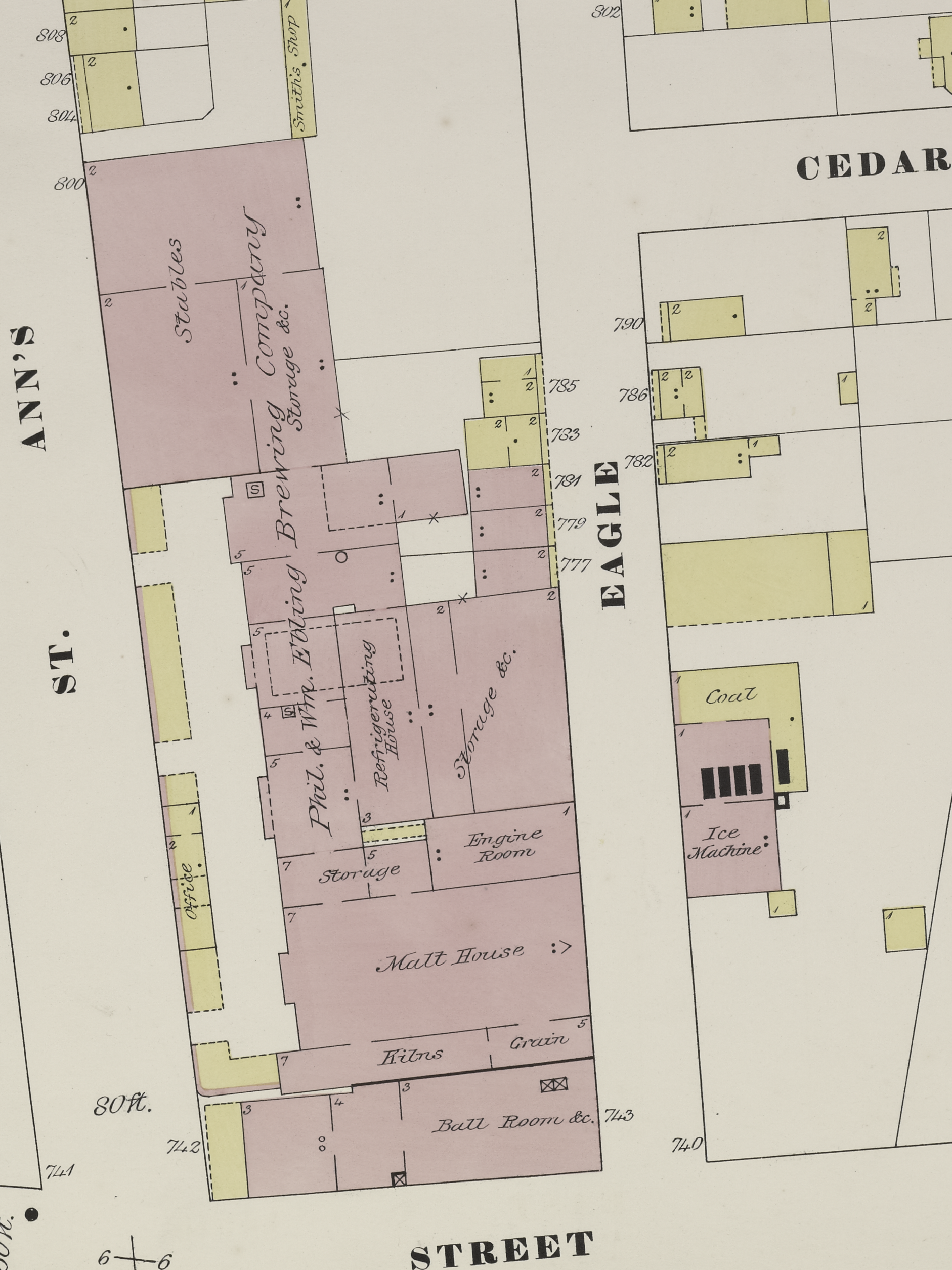
Philip and William Ebling Brewing Company" on St. Ann's Street 1891 map

The Ebling Brewing Company, founded in 1868, was a brewery located in the South Bronx when German was the second language to English there. The company advertised their technique of aging their beer in "natural rock caves." These caves were dug into a hill behind its headquarters under the brewery in the Bronx. The Ebling Brewing Company suffered under the laws of Prohibition. In 1925 it was required to padlock its doors for four months and pay a $250,000 fine after it was found to have two truckloads of beer that had higher than the legal alcohol content, i.e.: they were found to be possessing "real beer." The 72-year old president of the company at the time was William Ebling. In 1949, the company was affected by the 1949 New York City brewery strike. The company finally closed its doors for good that decade. The Ebling Brewing Company headquarters were razed and a parking lot was created over the site. The caves, sometimes as large as 20' x 100', were covered and forgotten by most people.

In 2009, a developer, The Joy Construction Corporation, uncovered the caves as they began building a 600-unit low- and moderate-income housing on the site. There was much mystery surrounding the purpose of the network of caves under the site. Purposes considered included the Underground Railroad and bomb raid shelters. The president of Joy Construction, Amnon Shalhov, and Carly Sullivan, a spokeswoman for the Department of Buildings, said they said knew before construction began that the caves existed. Employees of the Joy Construction Corporation hoped to find buried beer memorabilia treasure. Unfortunately, none, other than the empty caves were found.
