= Edward Uihlein =

German American businessman (1845–1921)

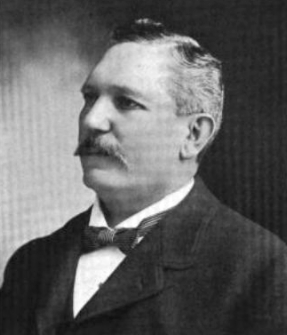
- Uihlein in a 1900 publication
- Born: Eduard Güstav Ühlein; October 19, 1845; Wertheim am Main, Grand Duchy of Baden, German Confederation
- Died: January 11, 1921 (aged 75); Milwaukee, Wisconsin, US
- Resting place: Forest Home Cemetery (Forest Park)
- Occupation: Businessman
- Employer: Joseph Schlitz Brewing Company
- Known for: Business Executive, Horticulture, Real Estate, Philanthropy
- Title: Vice President and Director of Schlitz Brewing Company
- Board member of: Milwaukee Brewers Association, Chicago Brewers Association
- Spouse: Augusta Manns
- Children: 6
- Relatives: Uihlein family

Edward Güstav Uihlein (born Ühlein; 19 October 1845 – 25 January 1921) was a German American business executive, horticulturist, real estate investor, and philanthropist. He was best known as the vice president of the Joseph Schlitz Brewing Company.

== Early life and education ==
Uihlein was born on 19 October 1845, in Wertheim am Main, the third of 9 children born to Josef Benedikt Ühlein and Katharina (née Krug). His parents were proprietors of the Gasthaus zur Krone (Inn of the Crown), a popular Inn in Wertheim. As a child he played the violin and was a member of the Catholic church choir. In 1849, his maternal uncle, Georg "August" Krug opened a brewery in Milwaukee which became the Joseph Schlitz Brewery.

== Career ==
=== Brewing ===
Uihlein was educated in Wertheim, though left school at age 14 to take on a mercantile apprenticeship working for Joseph Knapp in Miltenberg.

In June 1864, Uihlein accompanied the Franz Joseph Uhrig family and emigrated to St. Louis where he worked for grocer Fred Vodde, who promoted him to bookkeeper. After a year working for Vodde he was hired by Kuntz & Hoffmeister's Pacific Brewery as an accountant.

With the financial support of his brothers (August and Henry), Uihlein opened a grocery store in 1865, but sold it to invest in a manufacturing facility where he also sold industrial oils and greases. During this time, he gained notoriety for inventing an improved wagon wheel grease. With his quick-found success, he moved to Chicago to be closer to his biggest client; Chase, Hanford & Co. There, he opened a second factory and a metal wagon parts store in 1867. His businesses survived the Great Chicago Fire of 1871, and although very successful in his own rite, he accepted the invitation from Joseph Schlitz to head his brewery's Chicago markets in 1872.

In 1873, Uihlein became a naturalized citizen which was also the same year Schlitz Brewing Company was incorporated. On May 7, 1875, when Joseph Schlitz died at sea, the company continued operations under the leadership of the 6 Uihlein brothers: Henry, president; Edward – vice president; August – secretary, and chief operating officer; Alfred – superintendent and Brew Master; William – assistant superintendent of the brewery; Charles – superintendent of the bottling works.

When Mrs. Schlitz died in 1887, she willed her shares of the company to be divided between August, Edward, Henry, and Alfred Uihlein; giving the Uihlein family complete ownership of the corporation.

He retired from the Schlitz Corporation in 1915, at age 70.

=== Horticulture ===
Uihlein was a world traveler and particularly interested in park beautification. He sought out rare tropical plants and orchids for his personal collection and he owned the largest private conservatory in Chicago. In 1893, at the World's Columbian Exposition (Chicago World's Fair), Uihlein supplied most of the flowers and shrubs for the gardens.

From 1894 to 1897, he served on the West Chicago Park Commission, a precursor to the Chicago Park District, and was called an "outspoken friend of flowers and plants". He is credited with creating Garfield Park's famous orchid exhibits. In 1897, Uihlein was removed from his commissionership of the West Parks by Governor Tanner. He blamed it; "according to the American custom by the dictation of Politicians," and declared; "never again will I have anything to do with a political position".

In 1904, he was elected president of the Chicago Horticultural Society, the predecessor of the Chicago Botanic Garden in Glencoe, Illinois.

=== Real estate ===
In 1899, Uihlein purchased 134 acres on the west end of Geneva Lake and named the estate "Forest Glen". He commissioned his friend Jens Jensen from the Chicago Parks Department to create a beautiful landscape on the property. This helped Jensen immensely by giving him the confidence and connections to start his own firm. Uihlein kept the estate open to the public for all to enjoy. Unfortunately, the house burned to the ground in 1922 and the land was sold off and subdivided.

Edward Uihlein is considered a major contributor to Chicago's architectural landscape, responsible for the commissioning and construction of 57 Schlitz tied-houses from 1897 to 1905. Many of the buildings included the Schlitz logo, which Uihlein hired sculptor Richard Bock to create for the company in 1893.

10 of the former Schlitz tied-houses and one stable building have been given landmark status by the Chicago City Council.

Additionally, he was a founding member of the Chicago Heights Land Association.

=== Philanthropy ===
Uihlein was a prominent and active figure in Chicago's German American community. He served on boards of charitable, artistic, and ethnic organizations. He was a member of the Chicago Historical Society, the Art Institute of Chicago, the Germania Club, the German Press Club, the German Society for the Protection of Immigrants and Aid of the Friendless, a director of the German Opera House Company, president of the German Hospital, and president of the German Men's Choral Society (the Germania Männerchor). Following his death, his children donated the funds to build the Edward G. Research Laboratory, to Grant Hospital in Lincoln Park.

Among other prized artworks, he donated a reduced copy of the "King Frederick the Great" sculpture, created by Christian Daniel Rauch, to the Art Institute in 1894. The Uihlein Plaza behind The Chicago History Museum was named in his honor.

Uihlein supported his fatherland by heading the Ostpreußenhilfe chapter of Illinois; raising relief funds for towns that were damaged by the Russian occupation of Eastern Prussia in 1914. He further supported his hometown of Wertheim by donating money to the orphan's home, schools, the women's association, the May lottery, and the home for the blind. He was a staunch believer not forgetting his German roots and donated monies to Wertheim Historical Society, and paid the membership dues for his entire family, in hopes it would succeed and future generations of his family could visit. In gratitude for all of his contributions, he was named honorary citizen of Wertheim, honorary member of the Wertheim Historical Society, and the Edward Uihlein School is named in his honor.

A monument stone located at Brückengasse 4 in Wertheim is inscribed: "Former Gasthaus zur Krone, birthplace of the honorary citizens of the city of Wertheim – Edward G Uihlein in Chicago and William J. Uihlein in Milwaukee, and their siblings".

== Personal life and death ==
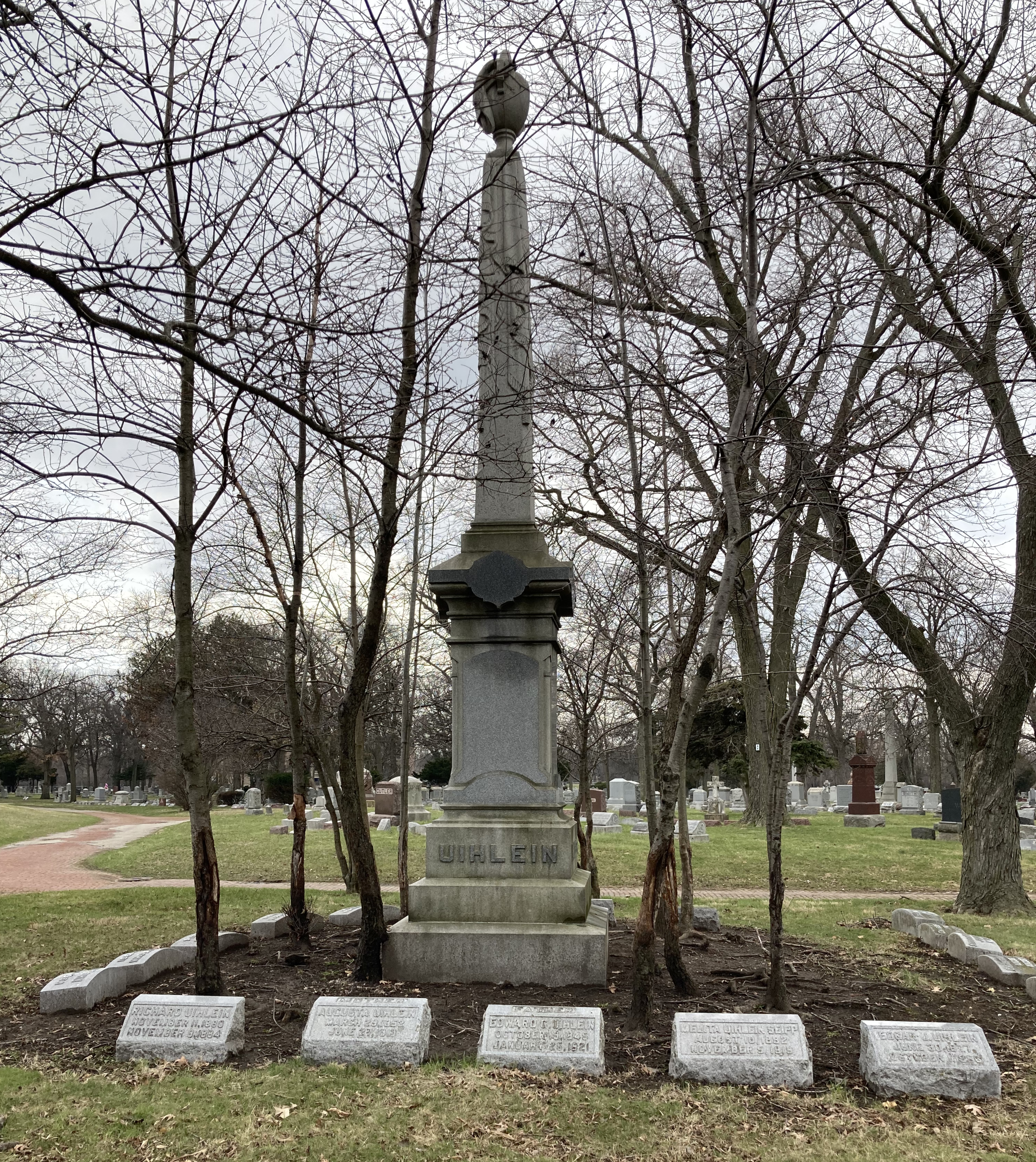
Edward Uihlein Grave

On January 28, 1875, Uihlein married Augusta Manns, a native of St. Louis, in Chicago.

Together they had 6 children: Clara (Trostel), Edgar John, Olga (Beneke), Richard, Ella (Seipp), Melita (Seipp). Coincidentally, Edward's brother Charles married Augusta's sister Emma in 1878.

In 1877, Uihlein commissioned the architecture firm of Frommann & Jebsen to construct a house on Beer Baron's Row in the Wicker Park neighborhood at 2041 W. Pierce Avenue (originally 34 Ewing Place). He lived there until his death, shortly after which it was demolished.

Uihlein died on January 25, 1921, aged 75, at his daughter Clara's home in Milwaukee and is buried in German Waldheim (N/K/A: Forest Home) Cemetery in Forest Park, Illinois. His estate at the time was worth $1.2 million and was divided equally among his surviving children.
