= Dabuy-ye Shomali Rural District =

Rural district in Mazandaran province, Iran

Dabuy-ye Shomali Rural District Persian: دهستان دابوی شمالی
- Rural District
- Location within Iran
- Coordinates: 36°37′N 52°26′E
- Country: Iran
- Province: Mazandaran
- County: Mahmudabad
- District: Sorkhrud
- Established: 1987
- Capital: Sorkhrud

Population (2016)
  - Total: 9,015
- Time zone: UTC+3:30 (IRST)

Dabuy-ye Shomali Rural District (Persian: دهستان دابوی شمالی) is in Sorkhrud District of Mahmudabad County, Mazandaran province, Iran. It is administered from the city of Sorkhrud.

== Demographics ==
=== Population ===
At the time of the 2006 National Census, the rural district's population was 7,745 in 2,112 households. There were 8,110 inhabitants in 2,531 households at the following census of 2011. The 2016 census measured the population of the rural district as 9,015 in 3,045 households. The most populous of its 16 villages was Zangi Kola-ye Olya, with 1,583 people.

=== Other villages in the rural district ===
- Afra Sara
- Ahmadabad-e Kalij-e Olya
- Ahmadabad-e Kalij-e Sofla
- Alavi Kola-ye Mir
- Chaksar
- Darvishabad
- Eslam Mahalleh
- Gol Mahalleh
- Hajji Kola-ye Olya
- Hajji Kola-ye Sofla
- Kones-e Marz
- Mirdeh-ye Olya
- Mirdeh-ye Sofla
- Sirjarun
- Zangi Kola-ye Sofla
