= Joseph Schlitz =

German-American brewer (1831–1875)

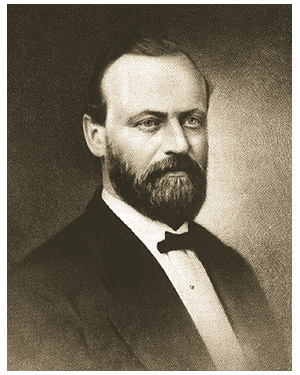
- Born: May 15, 1831; Mainz, Hesse-Darmstadt (now Rhineland-Palatinate, Germany)
- Died: May 7, 1875 (aged 43) at sea, near Isles of Scilly, Cornwall, England
- Resting place: Forest Home Cemetery, Milwaukee, Wisconsin, U.S.
- Occupation: Businessman
- Known for: Joseph Schlitz Brewing Company
- Spouse: Anna Maria Krug (m. 1858)

Joseph Schlitz (May 15, 1831 – May 7, 1875) was a German-American entrepreneur who made his fortune in the brewing industry.

== Biography ==
Joseph Schlitz was born on May 15, 1831, in Mainz, Hesse-Darmstadt. He immigrated to the U.S. in 1850.

In 1856, he assumed management of the Krug Brewery in Milwaukee, Wisconsin. (Note: Not to be confused with the later Krug Brewery that was located in Omaha, Nebraska.) In 1858, when he married George August Krug's widow, Anna Maria Krug (1819-1887), he changed the name of the company to the Joseph Schlitz Brewing Company. He became more successful after the Great Chicago Fire of 1871. Many of Chicago's breweries that had burned never reopened. Schlitz established a distribution point there and acquired a large part of the Chicago market.

Schlitz was a Freemason and was affiliated with Aurora Lodge No. 30.

Schlitz perished with 334 others in the wreck of the SS Schiller in thick fog off the Isles of Scilly on May 7, 1875. The islands lie 26 miles (42 km) west of Cornwall, England. He was returning via New York City and Hamburg, visiting Germany. Aged 43, his body was never recovered. A cenotaph at Forest Home Cemetery in Milwaukee honors him.

== Gallery ==
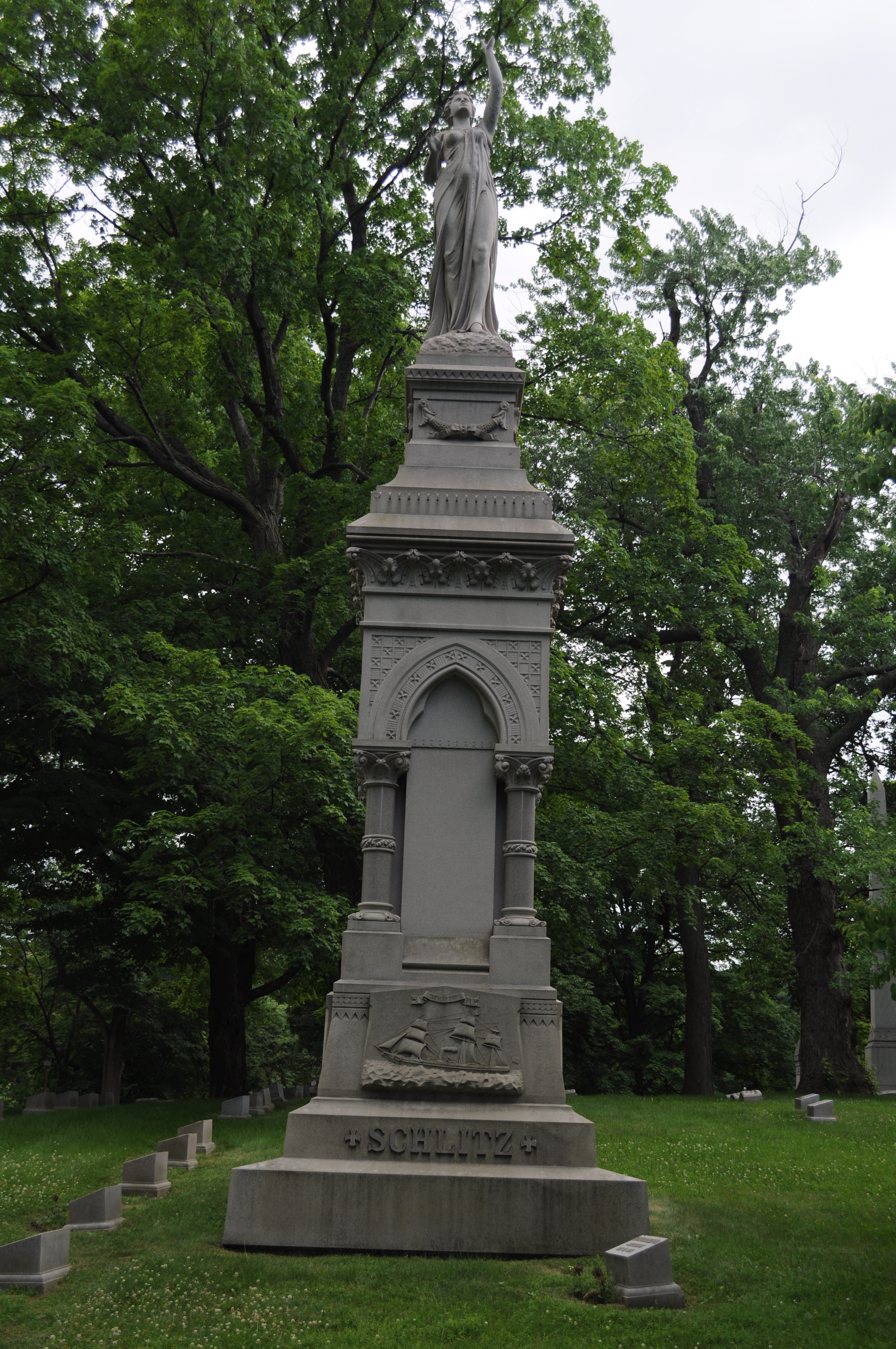
Cenotaph of Joseph Schlitz in Forest Home Cemetery

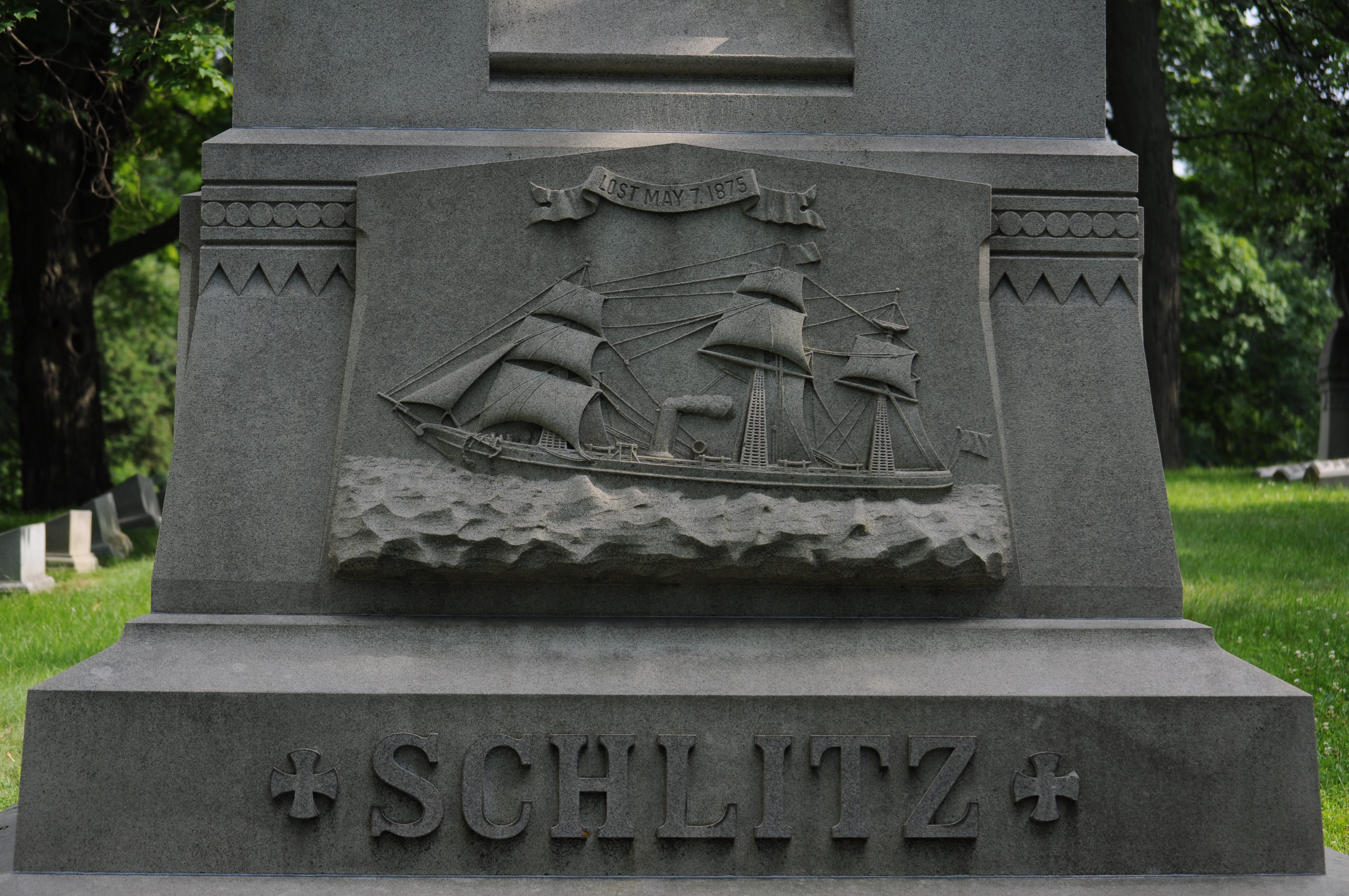
Memorial on the cenotaph of Joseph Schlitz

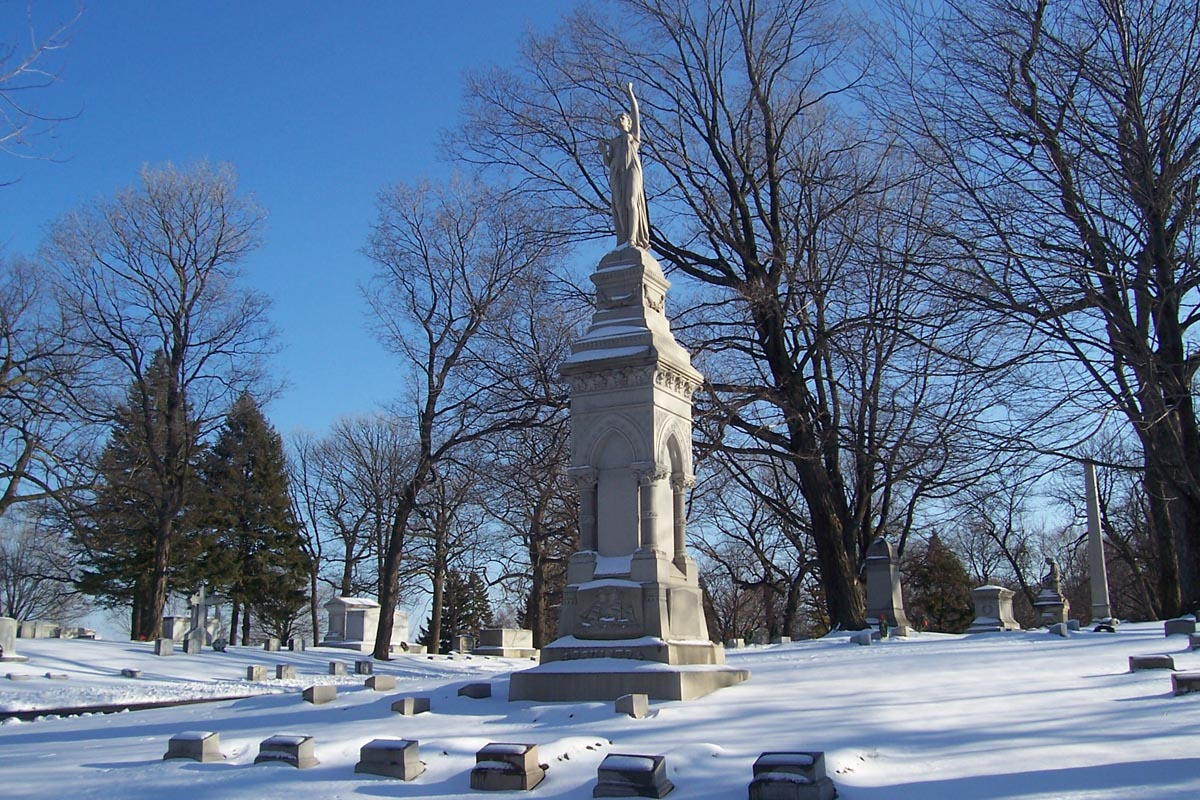
Cenotaph in Forest Home Cemetery

== See also ==
- Eberhard Anheuser
- Jacob Best
- Valentin Blatz
- Adolphus Busch
- Adolph Coors
- Gottlieb Heileman
- Frederick Miller
- Frederick Pabst
- August Uihlein
