= Joseph Schlitz Brewing Company =

American brewing company (1849–1999)

- Industry: Alcoholic beverage
- Founded: 1849 in Milwaukee, Wisconsin, U.S.
- Founder: August Krug
- Defunct: 1982
- Fate: Assets sold to Pabst Brewing Company
- Successor: Schlitz Brewing
- Headquarters: San Antonio, Texas, U.S.
- Key people: Joseph Schlitz; August Uihlein; Edward Uihlein; Robert Uihlein Jr.
- Products: Beer
- Owner: Blue Ribbon Partners
- Website: schlitzbrewing.com

Joseph Schlitz Brewing Company was an American brewing company based in Milwaukee, Wisconsin. Founded in 1849, it was once the largest producer of beer in the United States. Its namesake beer, Schlitz ( /ˈʃlɪts/), was later produced by Pabst Brewing Company.

The company was founded by August Krug in 1849, but ownership passed to Joseph Schlitz in 1858 when he married Krug's widow. Schlitz first became the largest beer producer in the U.S. in 1902 and enjoyed that status at several points during the first half of the 20th century, exchanging the title with Anheuser-Busch multiple times during the 1950s. It was bought in 1982 by Stroh Brewery Company, which shut down the Milwaukee brewery. Stroh's assets, including the rights to the Schlitz name, were sold in 1999 to Pabst Brewing Company, which is owned by Blue Ribbon Partners of San Antonio, an investment platform led by American beer and beverage entrepreneur Eugene Kashper. Pabst revived the Schlitz brand in 2008, later discontinuing production in 2026.

== History ==
=== Beginnings ===
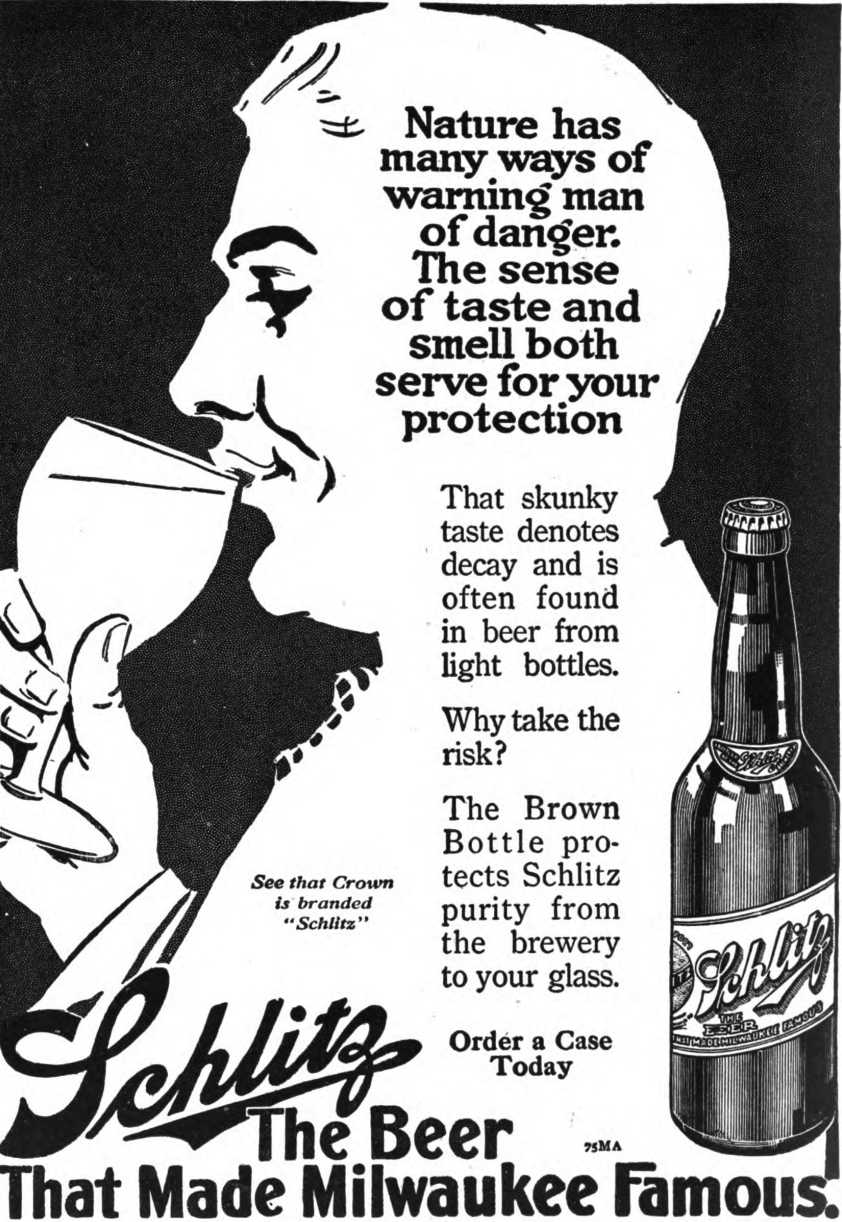
1914 advertisement

In Milwaukee, Joseph Schlitz was hired as a bookkeeper in a tavern brewery owned by August Krug. In 1856, he took over management of the brewery following the death of Krug. In 1858, Schlitz married the widow, Anna Maria Krug, and then changed the name of the brewery to the Jos. Schlitz Brewing Co. in 1861, Krug's 16-year-old nephew, August Uihlein, began employment at the brewery.

The often circulated story of Schlitz' proposed donation of thousands of barrels of beer to the Chicago population after the Great Chicago Fire of 1871 is simply a modern myth, pushed by later marketing campaigns. Schlitz' national expansion was based on new distribution points in Chicago and elsewhere, and the consequent use of the railway. From the late 1880s, Schlitz built dozens of tied houses in Chicago, most with a concrete relief of the company logo embedded in the brickwork; several of these buildings survive today, including the Lake Street Schlitz Tied House at the corner of Lake and Loomis, and Schuba's Tavern at the corner of Belmont and Southport. In 1873, Schlitz rejected a purchase offer from Tennessee brewer Bratton and Sons.

In 1875, Schlitz returned to his homeland on the SS Schiller. While returning home, the ship hit a rock near the Isles of Scilly and sank, killing Schlitz and 334 others. His body was never recovered. Honoring Krug's wishes, Schlitz had it written in his own will that he also wanted the Uihlein brothers to run the brewery when he died. Management was promptly passed to August Uihlein and his three brothers, Henry, Alfred and Edward. When Anna Maria Krug Schlitz died in 1887, the Uihleins acquired complete ownership of the firm, and the Uihlein family continued to run the brewery for over one hundred years. Despite this change, the Uihleins decided to keep the name Schlitz, as Americans had difficulty pronouncing their surname.

=== Prohibition and success ===
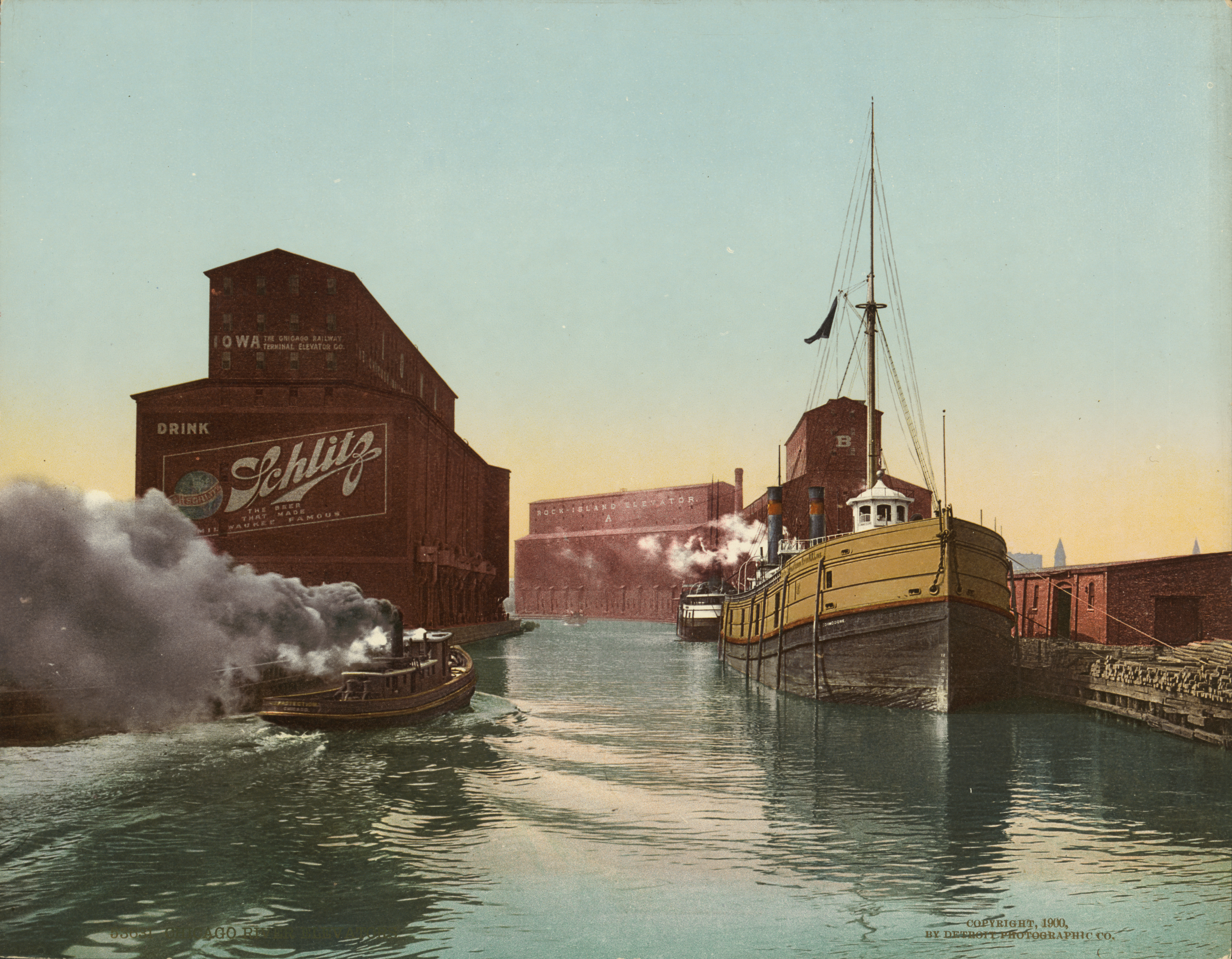
Advertising on the Chicago River grain elevators

The company flourished through much of the 1900s, starting in 1902 when the production of one million barrels of beer surpassed Pabst's claim as the largest brewery in the United States. Schlitz began pioneering numerous advances in the brewing industry, most notably the use of brown glass bottles beginning in 1912. Previously, beer was bottled in clear glass bottles, but this allowed sunlight to spoil the flavor of the beer. The entire industry quickly adopted the brown bottle, and the design is still used to this day. Schlitz's pioneering of the brown bottle was the inspiration for the Schlitz Brown Bottle Restaurant in Milwaukee, which opened in 1938.

However, their success would meet the first of several major obstacles. In the early 1900s, the temperance movement was gaining traction, and production and consumption of alcohol was eventually outlawed entirely with the passage of Prohibition in the United States in 1920. During Prohibition, Schlitz faced difficulties trying to stay open and keep their workers employed. In 1919, with Prohibition imminent, Joseph E. Uihlein Sr. created a division of Schlitz that would produce milk chocolate, looking to make good use of Wisconsin's large dairy industry. The chocolate was sold under the Eline brand (the phonetic pronunciation of Uihlein). However, Eline Chocolate did not have much success, as the Hershey company was dominant in the highly competitive chocolate industry, and Eline candies were often rife with quality control problems. Despite pouring millions into the chocolate division and creating a hard candy and gumball line, the venture was a failure and was abandoned by 1928.

This forced the company to change its name from Schlitz Brewing Company to the Schlitz Beverage Company and changed its "famous" slogan to "The drink that made Milwaukee famous." Schlitz primarily focused on producing malt extract and non-alcoholic soft drinks called Schlitz Famo that they used to keep the brewing equipment operational, as the Uihleins correctly deduced that Prohibition would not be permanent. After Prohibition ended in late 1933, Schlitz again began producing beer and quickly became the world's top-selling brewery in 1934.

=== First union strike and decline ===
In 1953, Milwaukee brewery workers went on a 76-day strike. The strike greatly impacted Schlitz's production, including all of Milwaukee's other breweries and allowed Anheuser-Busch to surpass Schlitz in the American beer market. The popularity of Schlitz's namesake beer, along with the introduction of value-priced Old Milwaukee, allowed Schlitz to regain the number-one position. Schlitz and Anheuser-Busch continued to compete for the top brewery in America for years. Schlitz remained the number-two brewery in America as late as 1976.

By 1967, the company's president and chairman was August Uihlein's grandson, Robert Uihlein Jr. Faced with a desire to meet large volume demands while also cutting the cost of production, the brewing process for Schlitz's flagship Schlitz beer was changed in the early 1970s. The primary changes involved using corn syrup to replace some of the malted barley, adding a silica gel to prevent the product from forming a haze, using high-temperature fermentation instead of the traditional method, and also substituted less-expensive extracts rather than traditional ingredients. Schlitz also experimented with continuous fermentation, even building a new brewery specifically designed to use the process in Baldwinsville, New York. The reformulated product resulted in a beer that not only lost much of the flavor and consistency of the traditional formula, but also spoiled more quickly, rapidly losing public appeal.

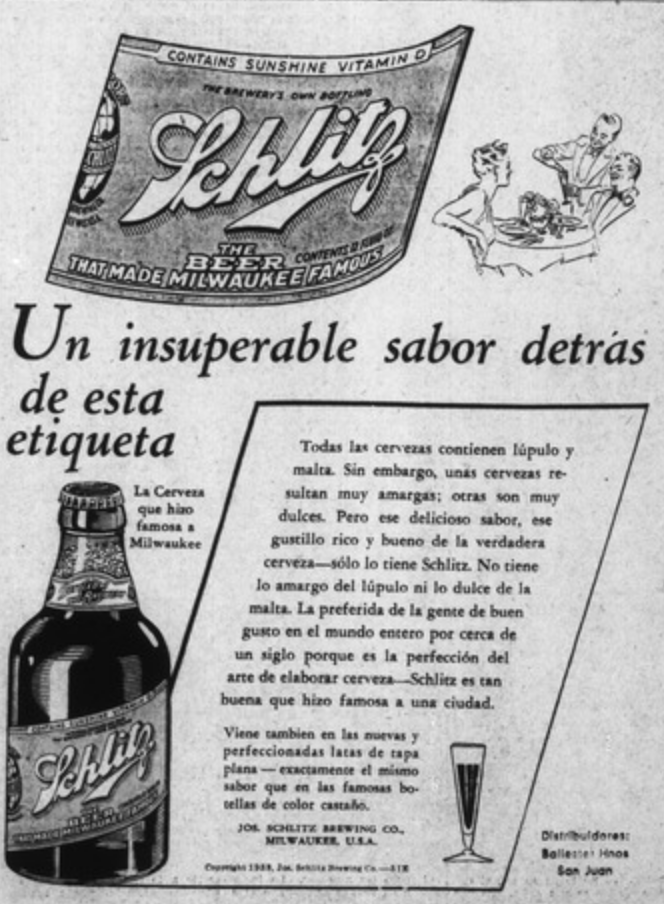
Schlitz Brewing Spanish ad in El Mundo newspaper (Puerto Rico 1939)

In 1976, concern was growing that the Food and Drug Administration would require all ingredients to be labeled on their bottles and cans. To prevent having to disclose the artificial additive of the silica gel, Uihlein switched to an agent called "Chill-garde" which would be filtered out at the end of production, so it would be considered nondisclosable. The agent reacted badly with a foam stabilizer that was used and Schlitz recalled 10 million bottles of beer, costing it $1.4 million. Schlitz was further hurt by the rise of high-volume light beers such as Miller Lite and Bud Light, a direction Schlitz did not aggressively pursue – although James Coburn appeared in commercials for the short-lived Schlitz Light in 1976.

As part of its efforts to reverse the sales decline, Schlitz launched a disastrous 1977 television ad campaign created by Leo Burnett & Co. In each of the ads, an off-screen speaker tries to convince a Schlitz drinker to switch to a rival beer. The Schlitz drinker then talked about how they would never switch and jokingly threatened the person trying to persuade them away from their favorite beer. Despite the tone of the campaign intending to be comedic levity, audiences found the campaign somewhat menacing and the ad industry dubbed it "Drink Schlitz or I'll kill you." Schlitz, unwilling to endure more bad press, pulled the campaign after 10 weeks and fired Burnett.

=== Second union strike and sale to Stroh ===
By the 1980s, Schlitz had rebounded somewhat, but it had now fallen from the second-most-popular brewery in the country to the fourth, as Miller and Pabst had overtaken it for the first time in decades. The final blow to the company was another crippling strike at the Milwaukee plant in 1981. About 700 production workers went on strike on June 1, 1981. The strike was triggered because there was no replacement contract when the union's contract expired.

The strike lasted for almost four months, and the company quickly abandoned all remaining hope that it could be saved, as all previous attempts were utter failures and the strikes had now crippled the company's production line and finances. The Schlitz management team finally threw in the towel and began negotiating a deal to sell the company and cut their losses. As the Milwaukee plant was the oldest and least efficient of the Schlitz breweries, and unable to afford to keep operating it due to the strike, Schlitz closed the doors to the Milwaukee brewery, thus ending the strike and, ultimately, signaling the end for Schlitz being one of the most popular beer companies in America. Also during that time, the "No One Does It Like the Bull" ad campaign was introduced. It featured music groups such as Kool and the Gang (who appeared in three of those commercials), the Drifters, Teddy Pendergrass, the Average White Band, Dr. Hook, the Platters, the Lettermen, Tommy James and the Shondells, the Four Tops, the Marshall Tucker Band and 38 Special engaging in a "battle of the bands"-like atmosphere before the bull storms into the room.

The Baldwinsville brewery was purchased by Anheuser-Busch in 1981 to supplement production of the upcoming Budweiser Light – now Bud Light – release in 1982. Because of the nonstandard brewery design, Baldwinsville is unique and capable of complex production, making it a key player in the 12 domestic Anheuser-Busch plants. In 1982, there were competing bids for ownership of the Schlitz brand. The Stroh Brewery Company of Detroit, Michigan beat out Pabst and Heileman by bidding for 67 percent of Schlitz. By spring of that year, Stroh had purchased the entire company, making Stroh's the third largest brewing enterprise in America. During the takeover, Schlitz fought a fierce battle in the courts trying to remain independent.

Schlitz finally accepted the takeover when Stroh raised its offer from an initial $16 per share to $17, and the U.S. Justice Department approved the acquisition once Stroh agreed to sell either Schlitz's Memphis or Winston-Salem breweries. The Milwaukee Schlitz Brewhouse stood unused after the sale to Stroh, until it was demolished in 2013. What remained of the historic Schlitz Brewery complex in Milwaukee was transformed with tax increment financing and other government support into a mixed-use development called Schlitz Park.

=== Pabst acquisition and revival ===
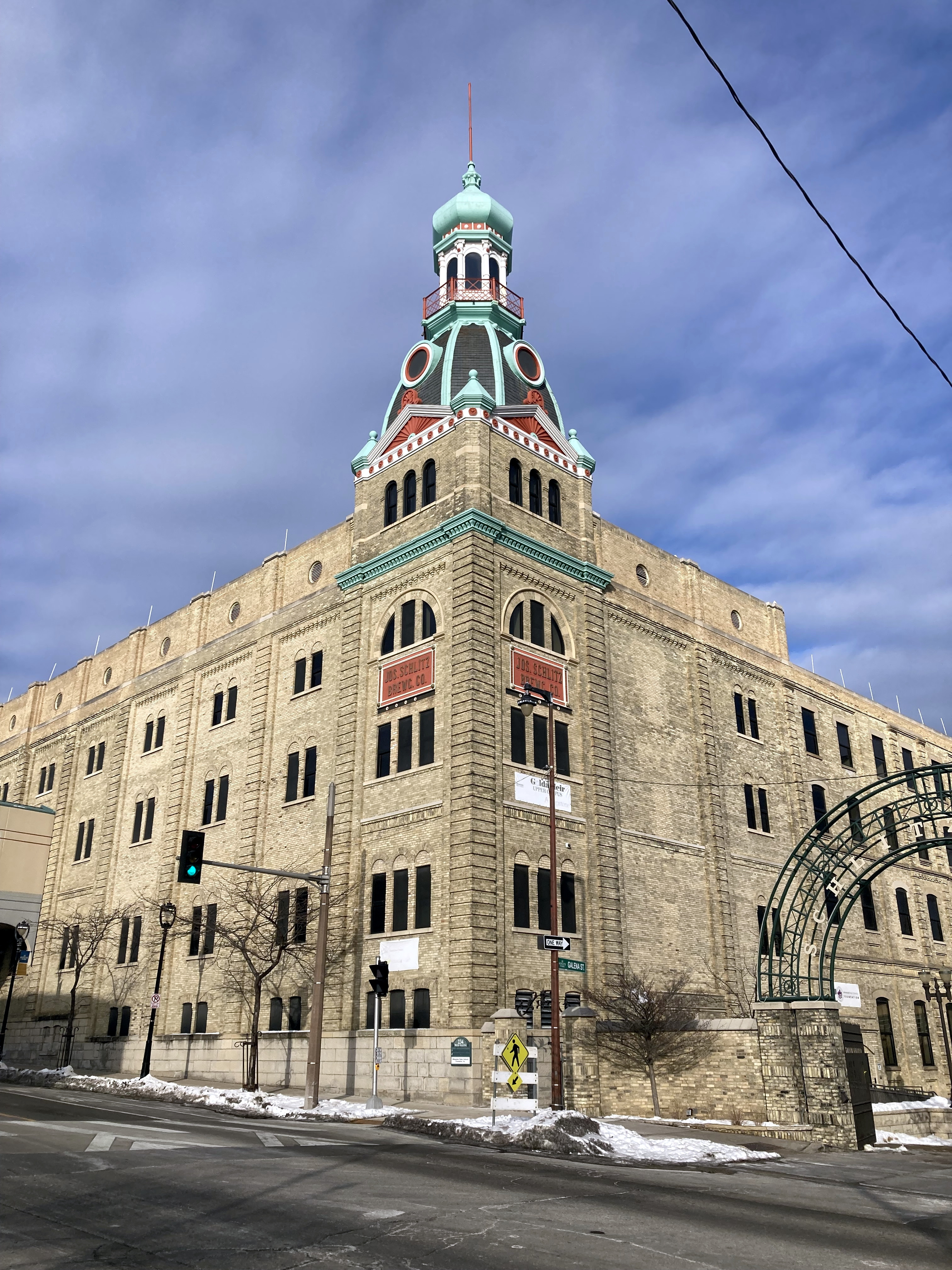
Former Joseph Schlitz Brewing Company brewery in Milwaukee in 2025

The once-strong Schlitz brand was relegated to cheap beer or "bargain brand" status and became increasingly difficult to find in bars and restaurants. Stroh itself was beginning to struggle from the weight of its business, and it had never been able to get out from under the debt it incurred when purchasing Schlitz. In 1999, Pabst Brewing Company gained control of the Schlitz brand with its acquisition of the Stroh Brewery Company.

During the reformulating period of the early 1970s, the original Schlitz beer formula was lost and never included in any of the subsequent sales of the company. Through research of documents and interviews with former Schlitz brewmasters and taste-testers, Pabst was able to reconstruct the 1960s classic formula. The new Schlitz beer, along with a new television advertising campaign, was officially introduced in 2008. The first markets for relaunching included Chicago, Florida, Boston, Minneapolis-Saint Paul, and Schlitz's former headquarters, Milwaukee. The classic 1960s theme was also reflected when 1968 Playboy magazine playmate Cynthia Myers became a spokeswoman for Schlitz beer in 2009.

In 2014, Pabst Brewing Company was purchased by American entrepreneur Eugene Kashper and TSG Consumer Partners. The deal included the Schlitz brand, as well as Pabst Blue Ribbon, Old Milwaukee, and Colt 45. Prior reports suggested the price agreed upon was around $700 million.

Pabst Brewing Company, now headquartered in San Antonio, continued to produce Schlitz beer, Old Milwaukee, and four Schlitz malt liquors—Schlitz Red Bull, Schlitz Bull Ice, Schlitz High Gravity, and Schlitz Malt Liquor. On May 15, 2026, Pabst announced it would discontinue production of Schlitz.

In June 2026, the National Bobblehead Hall of Fame and Museum released two officially licensed, limited-edition Schlitz Golden Goddess bobbleheads to commemorate the final brewing of Schlitz beer.

== Products ==
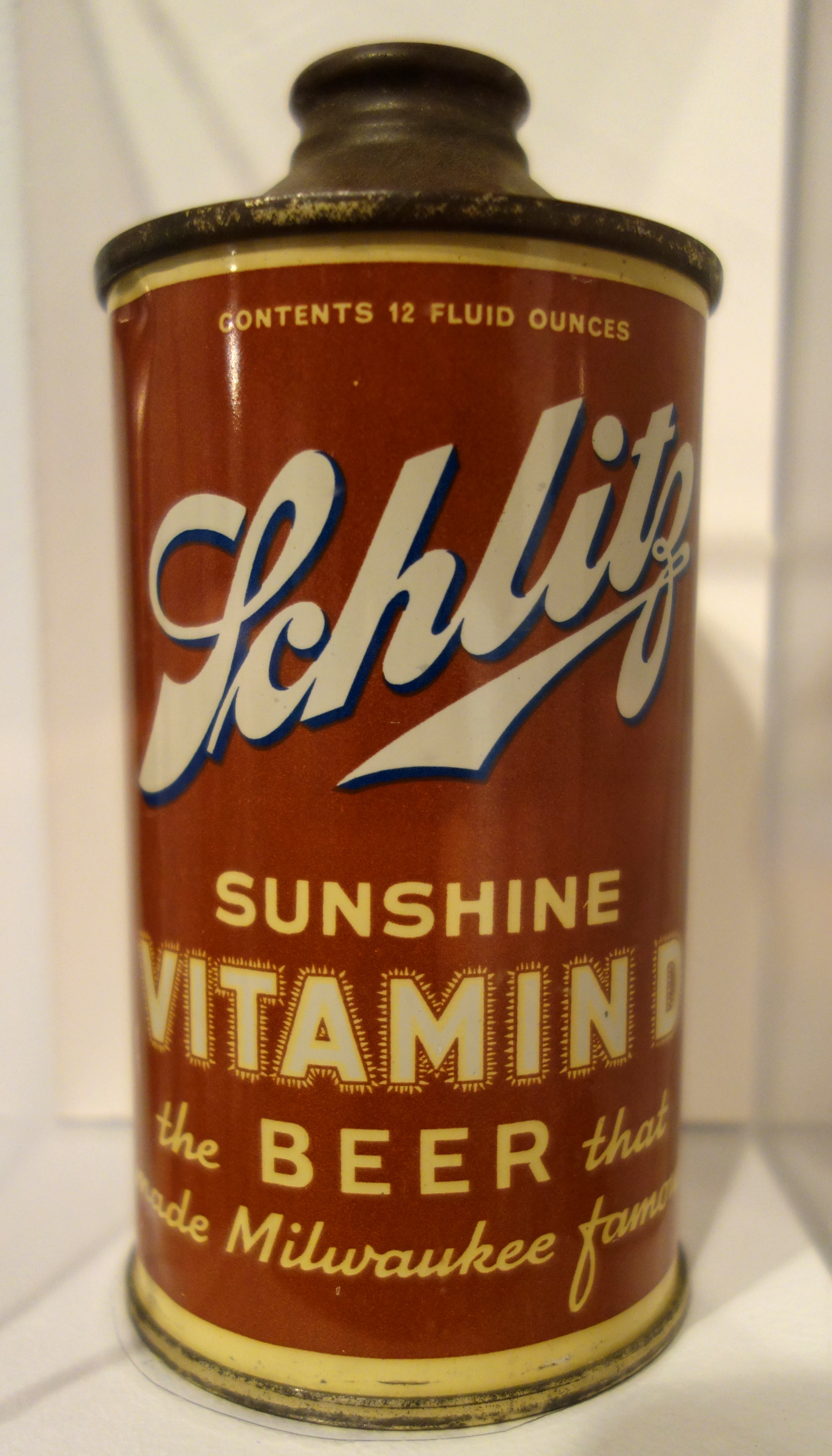
A Schlitz Sunshine Vitamin D Beer can, circa 1936, in the Wisconsin Historical Museum

- Schlitz: American-style lager
- Schlitz Light: Light lager
- Schlitz Dark: Dark version of the original lager
- Schlitz Malt Liquor: Malt liquor
- Schlitz Red Bull: Malt liquor
- Schlitz Ice: Ice-brewed lager
- Old Milwaukee: American-style lager
- Primo: American-style lager

== Slogans ==
- "The beer that made Milwaukee famous"
- "When you're out of Schlitz, you're out of beer"
- "Real Gusto!"
- "Just the kiss of the hops"
- "Move up to Schlitz"
- "The greatest name in beer"
- "Schlitz Rocks America"
- "Go for the Gusto"
- "When it's right, you know it"
- "There's just one word for beer, and you know it"
- "No One Does It Like the Bull"

== See also ==
- Beer in Milwaukee
- List of defunct breweries in the United States
- Schlitz Playhouse of Stars and Pulitzer Prize Playhouse, sponsored television series
- Union Refrigerator Transit Line, a private refrigerator car line established by Schlitz in 1895
- "What's Made Milwaukee Famous (Has Made a Loser Out of Me)", a 1968 song
