= Union Refrigerator Transit Line =

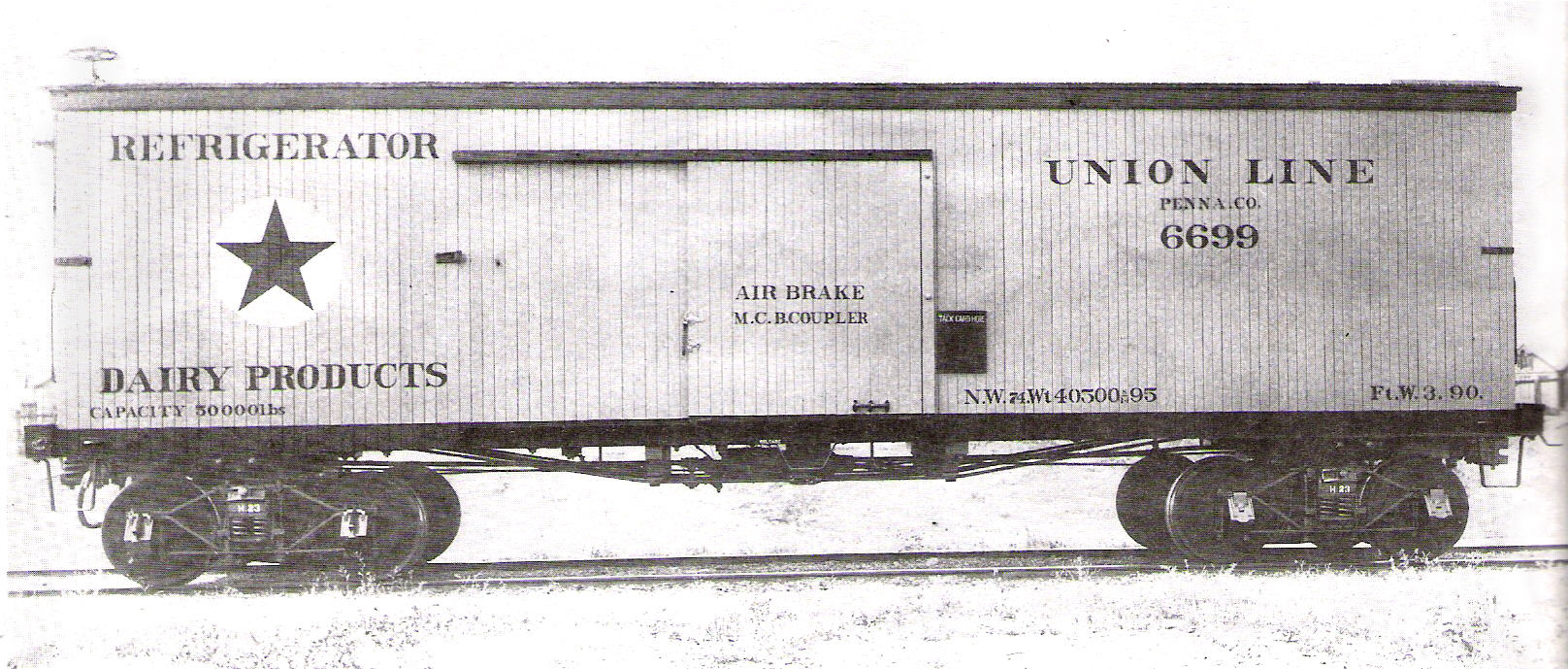
Insulated wood boxcars such as Union Line #6699, built in 1895, were used to transport dairy products such as milk, cheese, and eggs to market.

The Union Refrigerator Transit Line (URT) was a St. Louis, Missouri- and Milwaukee, Wisconsin-based private refrigerator car line established in 1895 by the Joseph Schlitz Brewing Company. In 1929, the General American Tank Car Corporation acquired the URT and placed its rolling stock into lease service. In the early 1970s the company, then operating as the General American Transportation Corporation (GATX) liquidated its URT subsidiary along with its outdated wooden reefer fleet.

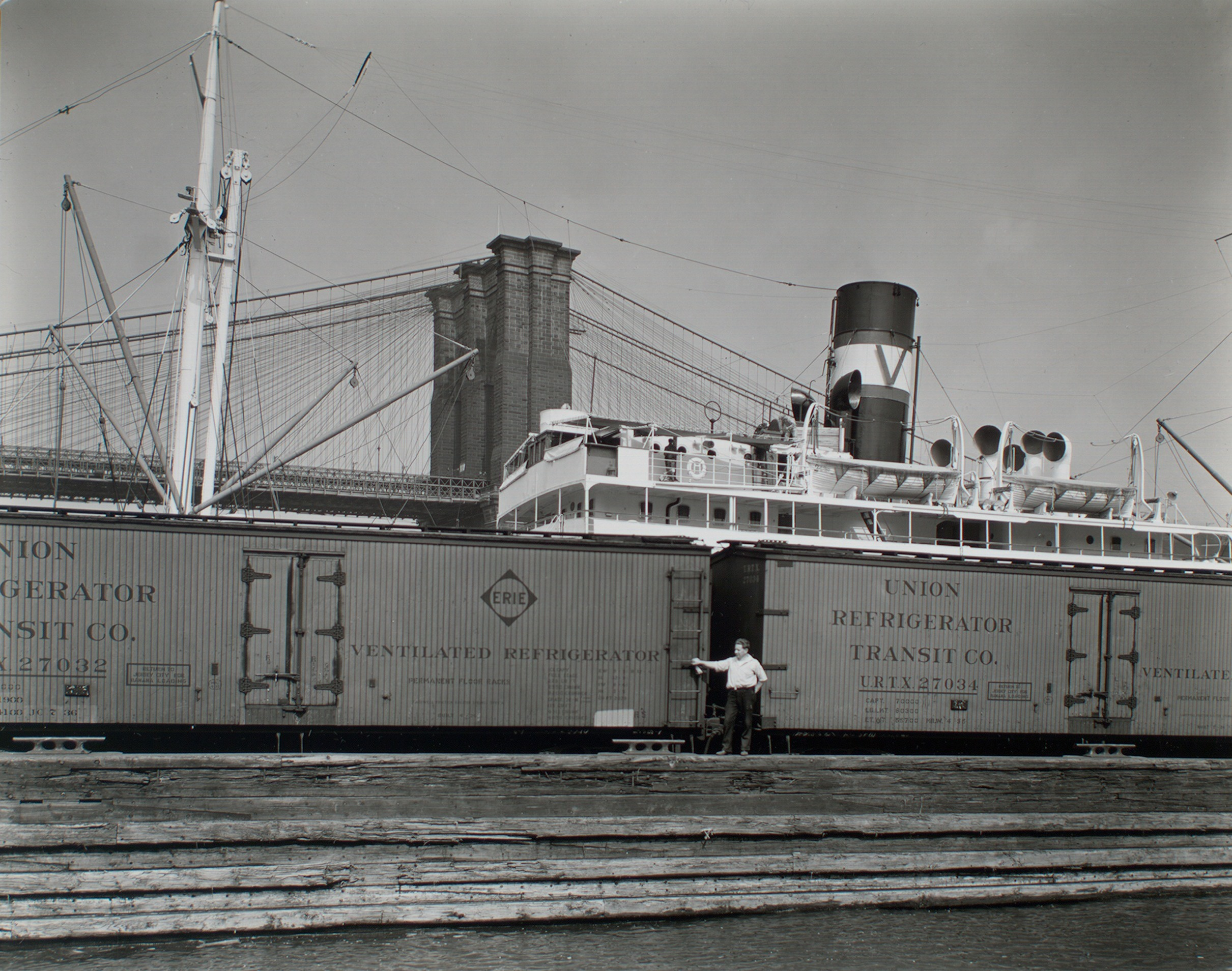
URTX cars on pier 19, East River, Manhattan. 1936

Union Refrigerator Transit Line, 1930–1970:

1930	1940	1950	1960	1970
4,581	7,481	5,726	5,237	3,340

Source: The Great Yellow Fleet, p. 17.
