= Asadollahabad, Khuzestan =

Asadollahabad اسداله اباد
- Village
- Location within Iran
- Coordinates: 32°28′39″N 49°10′57″E
- Country: Iran
- Province: Khuzestan
- County: Lali
- Bakhsh: Hati
- Rural District: Hati

Population (2006)
  - Total: 44
- Time zone: UTC+3:30 (IRST)
  - Summer (DST): UTC+4:30 (IRDT)

Asadollahabad (Persian: اسداله اباد, also Romanized as Āsadollāhābād) is a village in Hati Rural District, Hati District, Lali County, Khuzestan Province, Iran. At the 2006 census, its population was 44, in 7 families.
