= Sorkhrud =

City in Mazandaran province, Iran

Sorkhrud Persian: سرخرود
- City
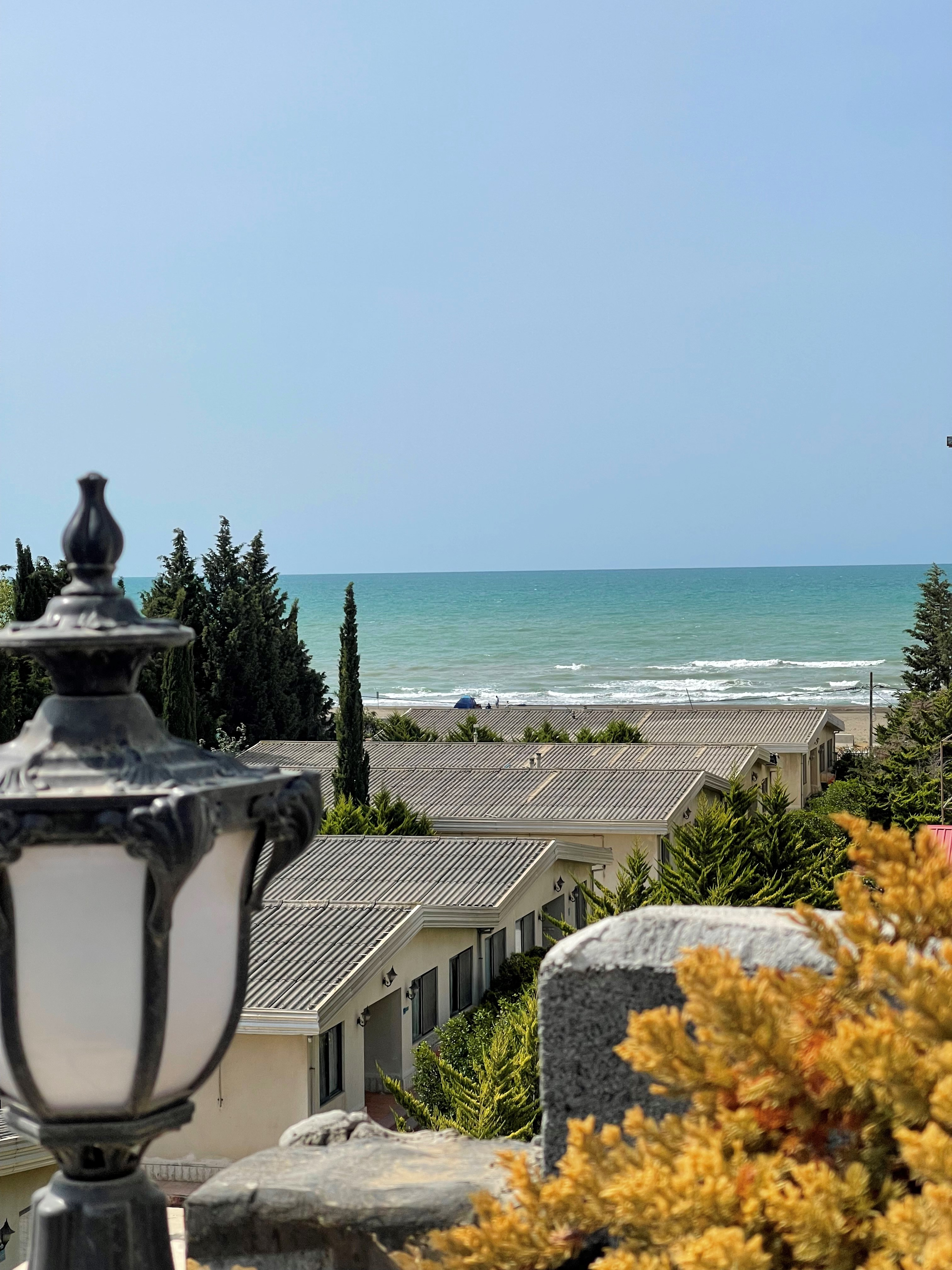

- Location within Iran
- Coordinates: 36°40′16″N 52°26′54″E
- Country: Iran
- Province: Mazandaran
- County: Mahmudabad
- District: Sorkhrud

Population (2016)
  - Total: 6,699
- Time zone: UTC+3:30 (IRST)

Sorkhrud (Persian: سرخرود) (Note: Also romanized as Sorkh Rūd and Sorkhrūd; also known as Sokhrun, Sorkhrūd-e Gharbī, and Surkhrūd) is a city in, and the capital of, Sorkhrud District in Mahmudabad County, Mazandaran province, Iran. It also serves as the administrative center for Dabuy-ye Shomali Rural District.

== Demographics ==
=== Population ===
At the time of the 2006 National Census, the city's population was 6,569 in 1,841 households. The following census in 2011 counted 5,921 people in 1,832 households. The 2016 census measured the population of the city as 6,699 people in 2,248 households.
