= Sorkhrud District =

District in Mazandaran province, Iran

Sorkhrud District Persian: بخش سرخ‌رود
- District
- Location within Iran
- Coordinates: 36°37′N 52°24′E
- Country: Iran
- Province: Mazandaran
- County: Mahmudabad
- Established: 1995
- Capital: Sorkhrud

Population (2016)
  - Total: 32,640
- Time zone: UTC+3:30 (IRST)

Sorkhrud District (Persian: بخش سرخ‌رود) is in Mahmudabad County, Mazandaran province, Iran. Its capital is the city of Sorkhrud.

== Demographics ==
=== Population ===
At the time of the 2006 National Census, the district's population was 30,657 in 8,398 households. The following census in 2011 counted 31,236 people in 9,623 households. The 2016 census measured the population of the district as 32,640 inhabitants in 11,167 households.

=== Administrative divisions ===
Sorkhrud District Population
Administrative Divisions	2006	2011	2016
Dabuy-ye Shomali RD	7,745	8,110	9,015
Harazpey-ye Shomali RD	16,343	17,205	16,926
Sorkhrud (city)	6,569	5,921	6,699
Total	30,657	31,236	32,640
RD = Rural District
