= Emamzadeh Ali =

Emamzadeh Ali (Persian: امامزاده علي) may refer to:

- Emamzadeh Ali, Fars
- Emamzadeh Ali Rural District, an administrative division of Zarqan County, Fars province
- Emamzadeh Ali (Emamzadeh Ali Farim), Mazandaran province
- Emamzadeh Ali (Emamzadeh Ali-ye Shelimak), Mazandaran province
- Emamzadeh Ali, South Khorasan

== See also ==
- Emamzadeh Ali Akbar (disambiguation)
