= Valik (disambiguation) =

Tanhakola gharbi is a village in Babol County, Mazandaran Province, Iran.

Tanhakola gharbi (Persian: تنهاکلا غربی) may also refer to:

- Valik-e Olya, Amol County
- Valik-e Sofla, Amol County
- Tanhakola gharbi, Babol County
- Tanhakola gharbi Takht, Babol County
- Valik Bon, Sari County
- Valik Chal, Sari County
