= Siah Dasht =

Siah Dasht (Persian: سياه دشت) may refer to:

- Siah Dasht-e Olya, Mazandaran Province
- Siah Dasht-e Sofla, Mazandaran Province
- Siah Dasht, North Khorasan
