= Resket =

Resket or Raskat (Persian: رسكت) may refer to:

- Resket-e Olya
- Resket-e Sofla
