= Dadu Kola =

Village in Mazandaran province, Iran

Dadu Kola Persian: دادوكلا
- Village
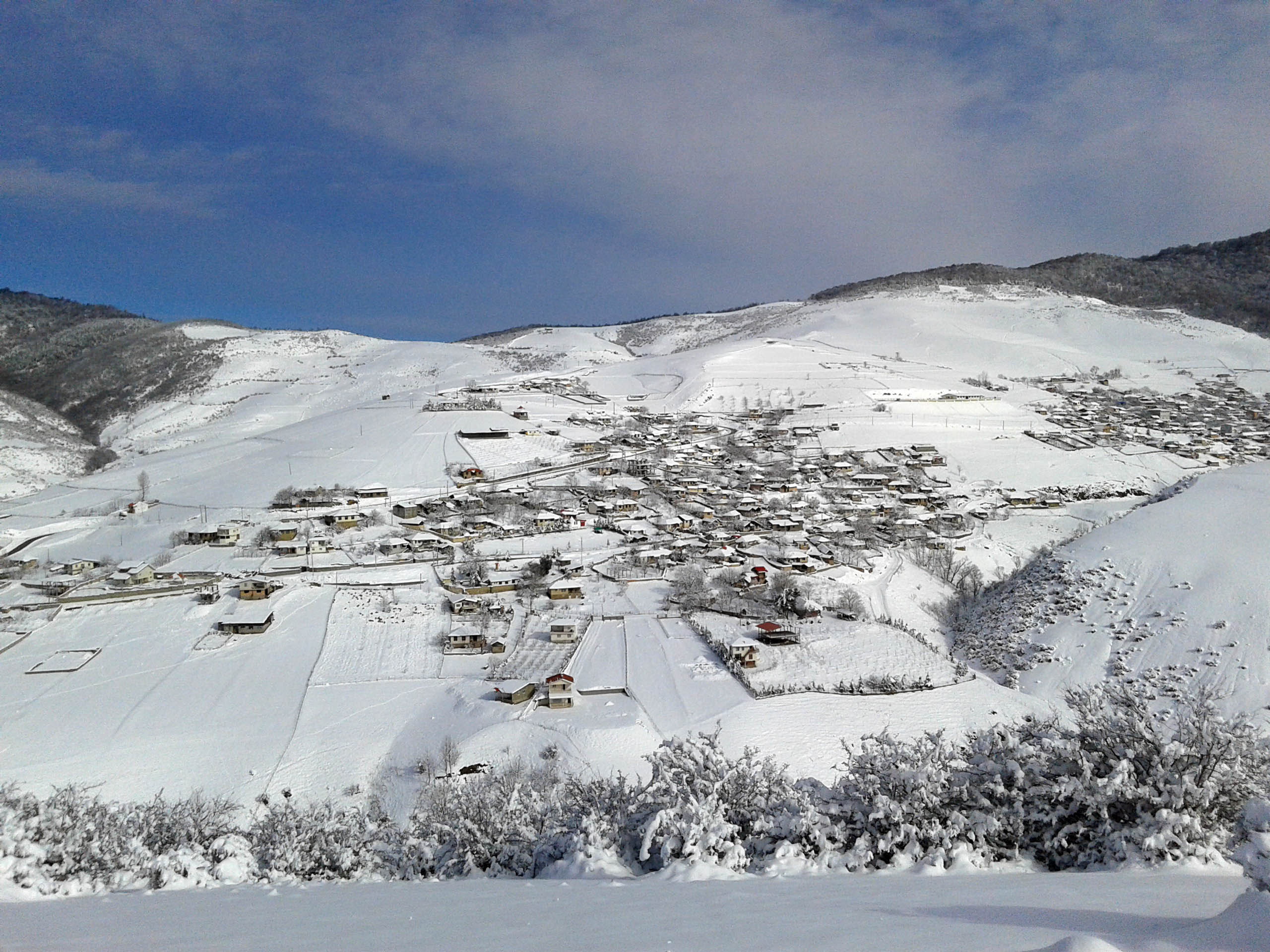
- The villages of Dadu Kola and Sud Kola

- Location within Iran
- Coordinates: 36°05′48″N 53°11′50″E
- Country: Iran
- Province: Mazandaran
- County: Sari
- District: Dodangeh
- Rural District: Banaft

Population (2016)
  - Total: 164
- Time zone: UTC+3:30 (IRST)

Dadu Kola (Persian: دادوكلا) (Note: Also romanized as Dādū Kalā and Dādū Kolā; also known as Dādū Kūlā and Dāvūd Kolā) is a village in Banaft Rural District of Dodangeh District in Sari County, Mazandaran province, Iran.

== Demographics ==
=== Population ===
At the time of the 2006 National Census, the village's population was 208 in 52 households. The following census in 2011 counted 221 people in 63 households. The 2016 census measured the population of the village as 164 people in 63 households.
