= Par Kuh =

Par Kuh (Persian: پركوه) may refer to:

- Par Kuh, Hormozgan
- Par Kuh, Mazandaran
