= Faram =

Faram may refer to:

- Farim, Iran, a settlement in Mazandaran Province, Iran
- Faram, Pakistan, a village in Punjab, Pakistan
