= Varmezabad =

Varmezabad ورمزاباد
- Village
- Location within Iran
- Coordinates: 36°09′05″N 53°19′05″E
- Country: Iran
- Province: Mazandaran
- County: Sari
- Bakhsh: Dodangeh
- Rural District: Farim

Population (2016)
  - Total: 145
- Time zone: UTC+3:30 (IRST)

Varmezabad (Persian: ورمزاباد, also Romanized as Varmezābād and Varmazābād) is a village in Farim Rural District, Dodangeh District, Sari County, Mazandaran Province, Iran. At the 2016 census, its population was 145, in 58 families. Up from 134 in 2006.
