= Korash =

Korash may refer to:

- Korash, Iran
- Kurash
- Korash, a pagan deity mentioned in the Book of Abraham
