= Kor Cha =

Kor Cha كرچا
- Village
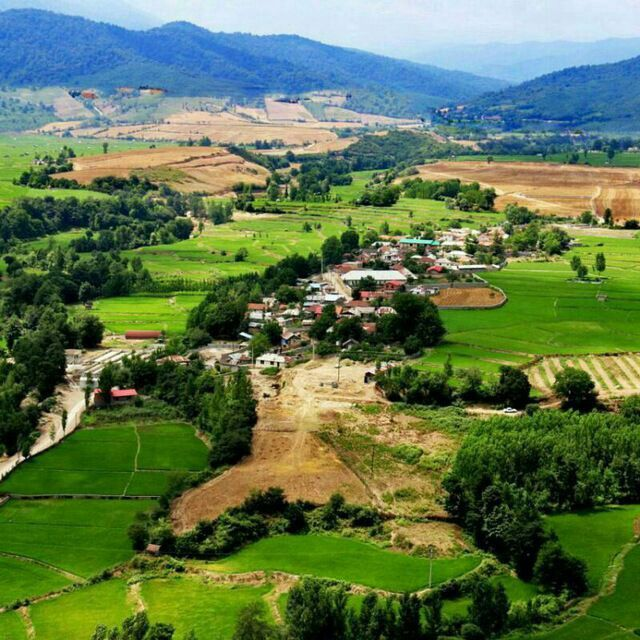

- Location within Iran
- Coordinates: 36°10′34″N 53°18′19″E
- Country: Iran
- Province: Mazandaran
- County: Sari
- Bakhsh: Dodangeh
- Rural District: Farim

Population (2016)
  - Total: 159
- Time zone: UTC+3:30 (IRST)

Kor Cha (Persian: كرچا, also Romanized as Kor Chā; also known as Kor Chāh) is a village in Farim Rural District, Dodangeh District, Sari County, Mazandaran Province, Iran. At the 2016 census, its population was 159, in 59 families.
