= Sang Deh, Mazandaran =

Village in Mazandaran province, Iran

Sang Deh Persian: سنگده
- Village
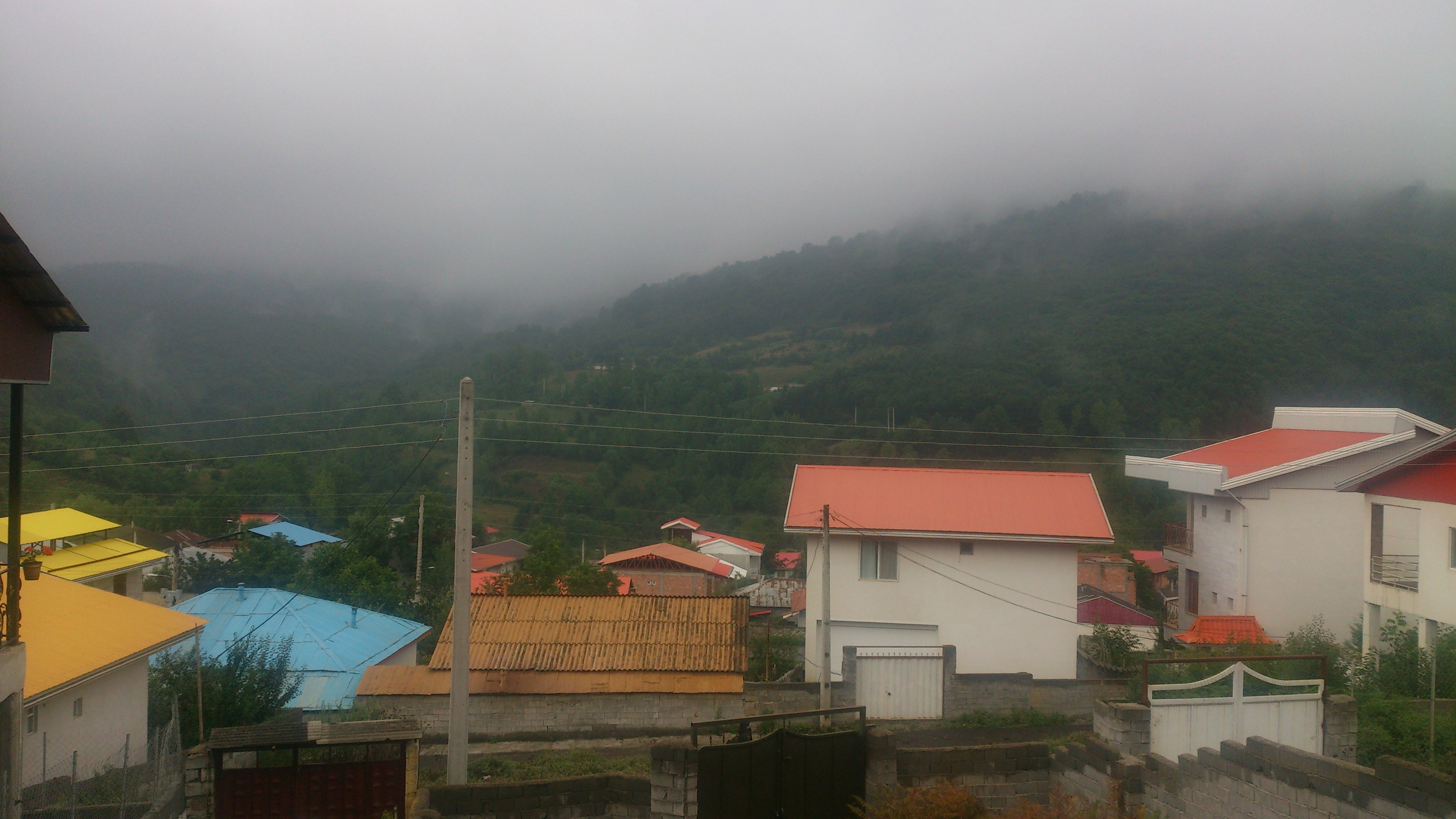
- The village of Sang Deh

- Location within Iran
- Coordinates: 36°04′04″N 53°12′55″E
- Country: Iran
- Province: Mazandaran
- County: Sari
- District: Dodangeh
- Rural District: Banaft

Population (2016)
  - Total: 1,227
- Time zone: UTC+3:30 (IRST)

Sang Deh (Persian: سنگده) is a village in, and the capital of, Banaft Rural District in Dodangeh District of Sari County, Mazandaran province, Iran.

== Demographics ==
=== Population ===
At the time of the 2006 National Census, the village's population was 1,528 in 429 households. The following census in 2011 counted 1,146 people in 363 households. The 2016 census measured the population of the village as 1,227 people in 418 households, the most populous in its rural district.

== See also ==
Media related to Sang Deh, Mazandaran at Wikimedia Commons
