= Pachi, Mazandaran =

Village in Mazandaran province, Iran

Pachi Persian: پاچي
- Village
- Location within Iran
- Coordinates: 36°05′00″N 53°16′21″E
- Country: Iran
- Province: Mazandaran
- County: Sari
- District: Dodangeh
- Rural District: Banaft

Population (2016)
  - Total: 342
- Time zone: UTC+3:30 (IRST)

Pachi (Persian: پاچي) (Note: Also romanized as Pāchī; also known as Pājī) is a village in Banaft Rural District of Dodangeh District in Sari County, Mazandaran province, Iran.

== Demographics ==
=== Population ===
At the time of the 2006 National Census, the village's population was 432 in 117 households. The following census in 2011 counted 395 people in 124 households. The 2016 census measured the population of the village as 342 people in 127 households.
