= Kohneh Deh, Sari =

Kohneh Deh كهنه ده
- Village
- Location within Iran
- Coordinates: 36°10′17″N 53°17′02″E
- Country: Iran
- Province: Mazandaran
- County: Sari
- Bakhsh: Dodangeh
- Rural District: Farim

Population (2016)
  - Total: 34
- Time zone: UTC+3:30 (IRST)

Kohneh Deh (Persian: كهنه ده) is a village in Farim Rural District, Dodangeh District, Sari County, Mazandaran Province, Iran. At the 2016 census, its population was 34, in 14 families. Down from 43 people in 2006.
