= Shel Darreh =

Shel Darreh شلدره
- Village
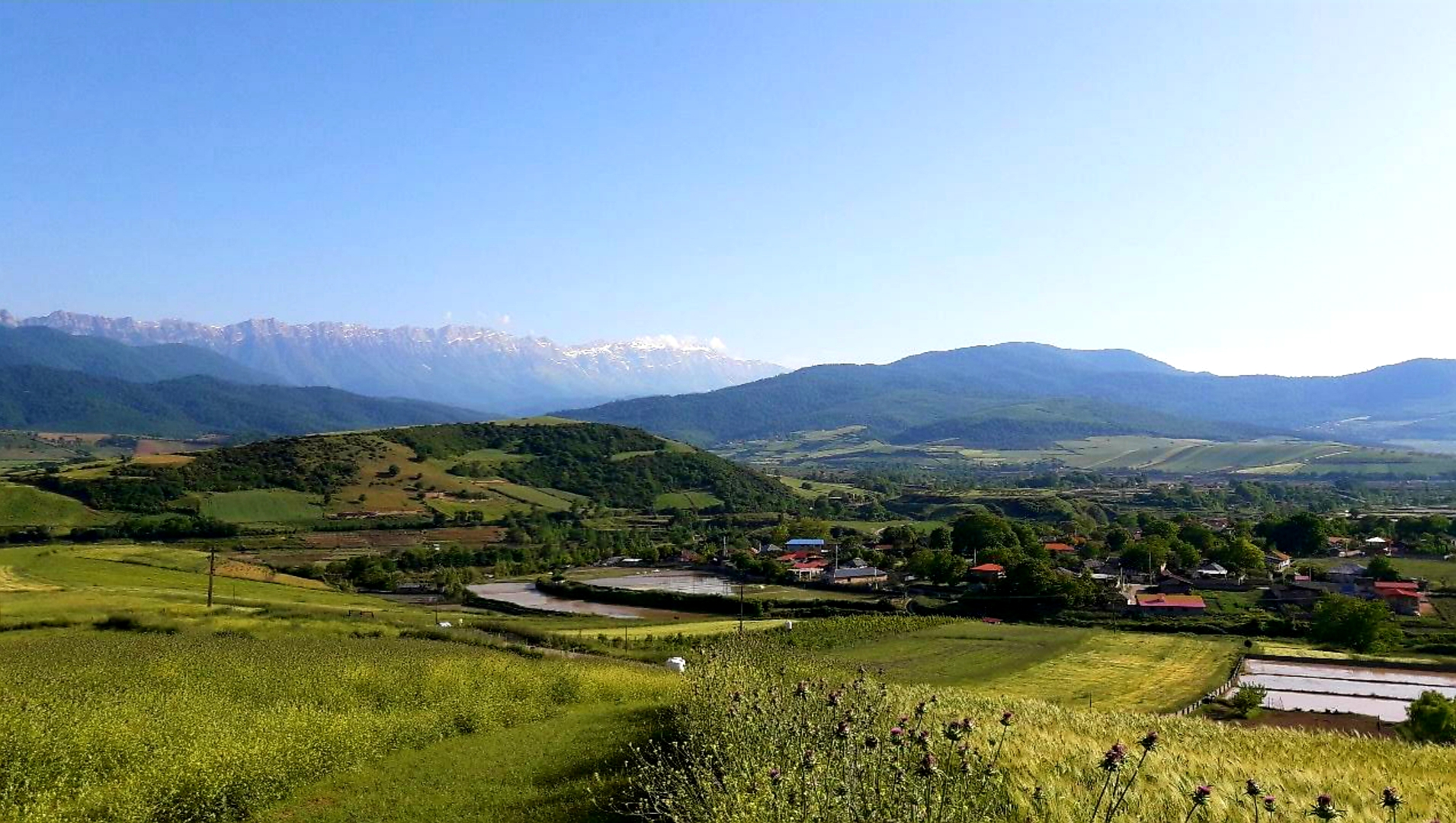

- Location within Iran
- Coordinates: 36°10′46″N 53°17′33″E
- Country: Iran
- Province: Mazandaran
- County: Sari
- Bakhsh: Dodangeh
- Rural District: Farim

Population (2006)
  - Total: 224
- Time zone: UTC+3:30 (IRST)

Shel Darreh (Persian: شلدره, also Romanized as Shol Darreh) is a village in Farim Rural District, Dodangeh District, Sari County, Mazandaran Province, Iran. At the 2016 census, its population was 170, in 63 families.
