= Kendelek =

Kendelek كندلك
- Village
- Location within Iran
- Coordinates: 36°10′39″N 53°11′05″E
- Country: Iran
- Province: Mazandaran
- County: Sari
- Bakhsh: Dodangeh
- Rural District: Farim

Population (2016)
  - Total: 56
- Time zone: UTC+3:30 (IRST)

Kendelek (Persian: كندلك) is a village in Farim Rural District, Dodangeh District, Sari County, Mazandaran Province, Iran. At the 2016 census, its population was 56, in 25 families. Large decrease from 159 people in 2006.
