= Kelich Kola =

Kelich Kola كليچ كلا
- Village
- Location within Iran
- Coordinates: 36°09′05″N 53°12′46″E
- Country: Iran
- Province: Mazandaran
- County: Sari
- Bakhsh: Dodangeh
- Rural District: Farim

Population (2006)
  - Total: 48
- Time zone: UTC+3:30 (IRST)

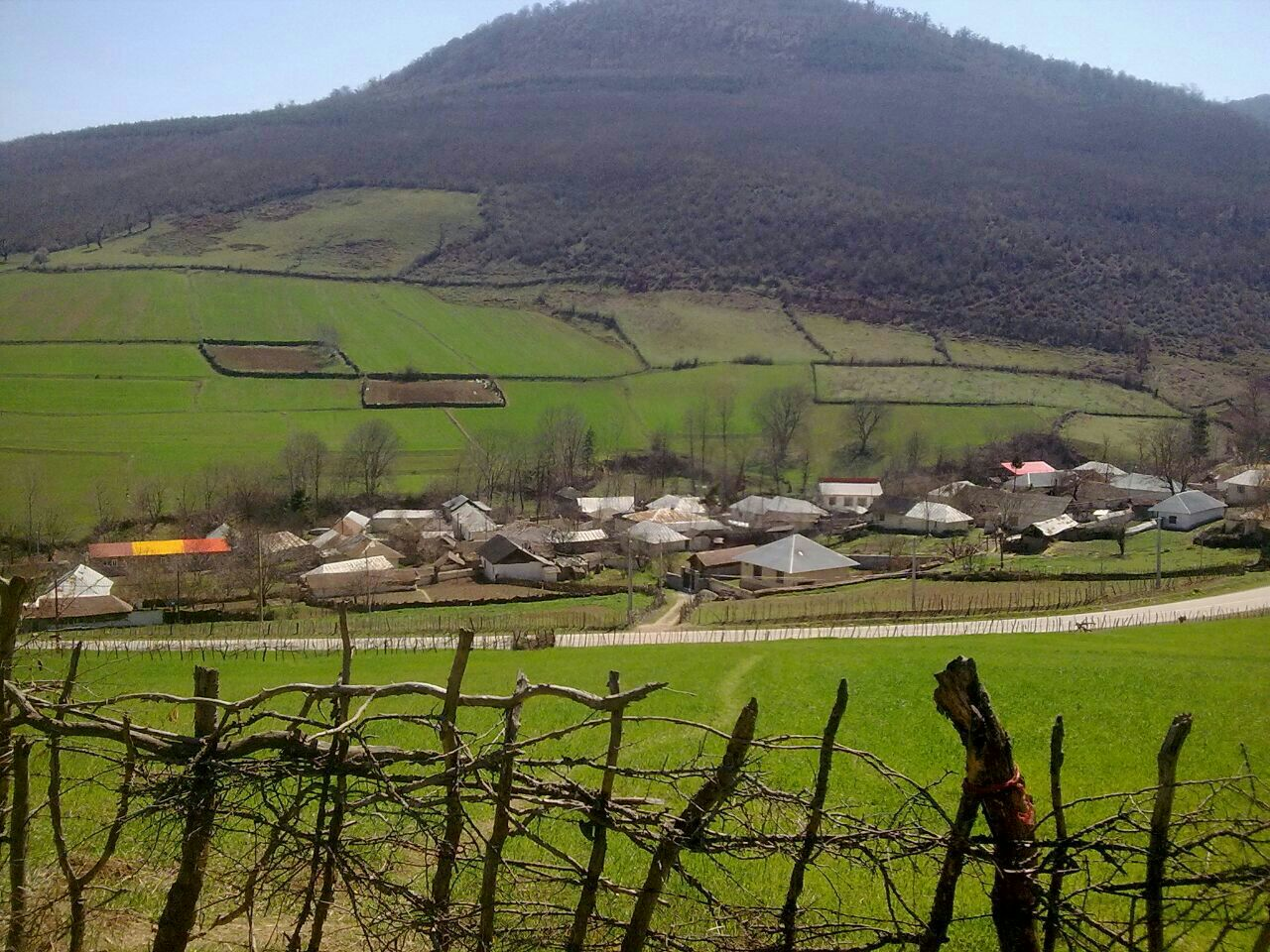

Kelich Kola (Persian: كليچ كلا, also Romanized as Kelīch Kolā; also known as Kelīj Kolā) is a village in Farim Rural District, Dodangeh District, Sari County, Mazandaran Province, Iran. At the 2016 census, its population was 14, in 7 families. Decreased from 48 people in 2006.
