= Khorramabad-e Dineh Sar =

Khorramabad-e Dineh Sar خرم آباد دينه سر
- Village
- Location within Iran
- Coordinates: 36°09′09″N 53°20′49″E
- Country: Iran
- Province: Mazandaran
- County: Sari
- Bakhsh: Dodangeh
- Rural District: Farim

Population (2016)
  - Total: 34
- Time zone: UTC+3:30 (IRST)

Khorramabad-e Dineh Sar (Persian: خرم آباد دينه سر, also Romanized as Khorramābād-e Dīneh Sar; also known as Khān-e Khorramābād and Khorramābād) is a village in Farim Rural District, Dodangeh District, Sari County, Mazandaran Province, Iran. At the 2016 census, its population was 34, in 13 families. Up from 28 in 2006.
