= Miana, Iran =

Village in Mazandaran province, Iran

Miana Persian: ميانا
- Village
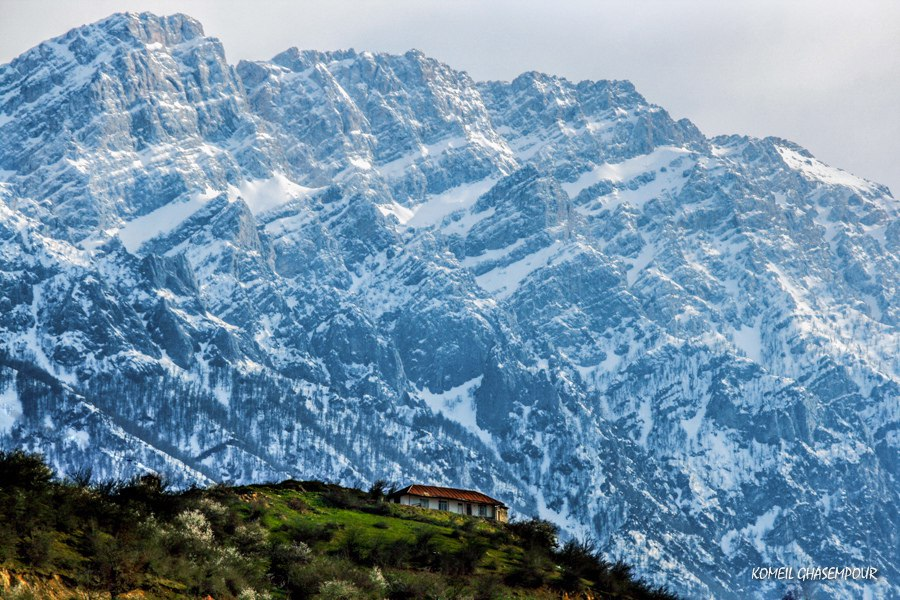
- Landscape near the village of Miana

- Location within Iran
- Coordinates: 36°04′34″N 53°16′08″E
- Country: Iran
- Province: Mazandaran
- County: Sari
- District: Dodangeh
- Rural District: Banaft

Population (2016)
  - Total: 259
- Time zone: UTC+3:30 (IRST)

Miana (Persian: ميانا) (Note: Also romanized as Mīānā) is a village in Banaft Rural District of Dodangeh District in Sari County, Mazandaran province, Iran.

== Demographics ==
=== Population ===
At the time of the 2006 National Census, the village's population was 287 in 89 households. The following census in 2011 counted 379 people in 136 households. The 2016 census measured the population of the village as 259 people in 107 households.
