= Mateh Kola =

Mateh Kola (Persian: مته كلا) may refer to:

- Mateh Kola, Babol
- Mateh Kola, Sari
- Mateh Kola, Savadkuh
