= Jafar Kola =

Jafar Kola جعفركلا
- Village
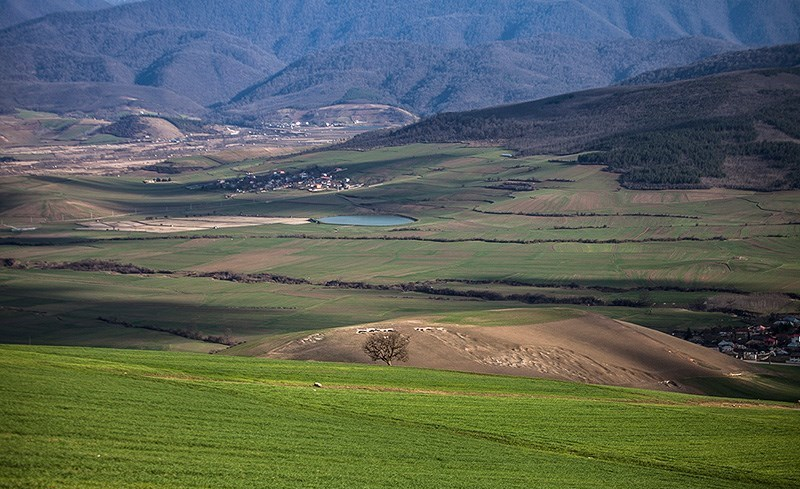
- Jafar Kola (Top left) and Pahnedar

- Location within Iran
- Coordinates: 36°09′34″N 53°15′57″E
- Country: Iran
- Province: Mazandaran
- County: Sari
- Bakhsh: Dodangeh
- Rural District: Farim

Population (2016)
  - Total: 42
- Time zone: UTC+3:30 (IRST)

Jafar Kola (Persian: جعفركلا, also Romanized as Ja‘far Kolā) is a village in Farim Rural District, Dodangeh District, Sari County, Mazandaran Province, Iran. At the 2016 census, its population was 42, in 20 families. Down from 60 in 2006.
