= Margab =

Margab may refer to the following places

- Margat, or Marqab, Syria
- Margab (Dubai), a community in Dubai
- Margav (disambiguation), places in Iran
