= Khvosh Rudbar =

Khvosh Rudbar خوشرودبار
- Village
- Location within Iran
- Coordinates: 36°08′13″N 53°17′17″E
- Country: Iran
- Province: Mazandaran
- County: Sari
- Bakhsh: Dodangeh
- Rural District: Farim

Population (2006)
  - Total: 21
- Time zone: UTC+3:30 (IRST)

Khvosh Rudbar (Persian: خوشرودبار, also Romanized as Khvosh Rūdbār; also known as Khoshk Rūdbār) is a village in Farim Rural District, Dodangeh District, Sari County, Mazandaran Province, Iran. At the 2016 census, its population was 21, in 10 families. Down from 31 people in 2006.
