= Maji, Iran =

Village in Mazandaran province, Iran

Maji Persian: مجی
- Village
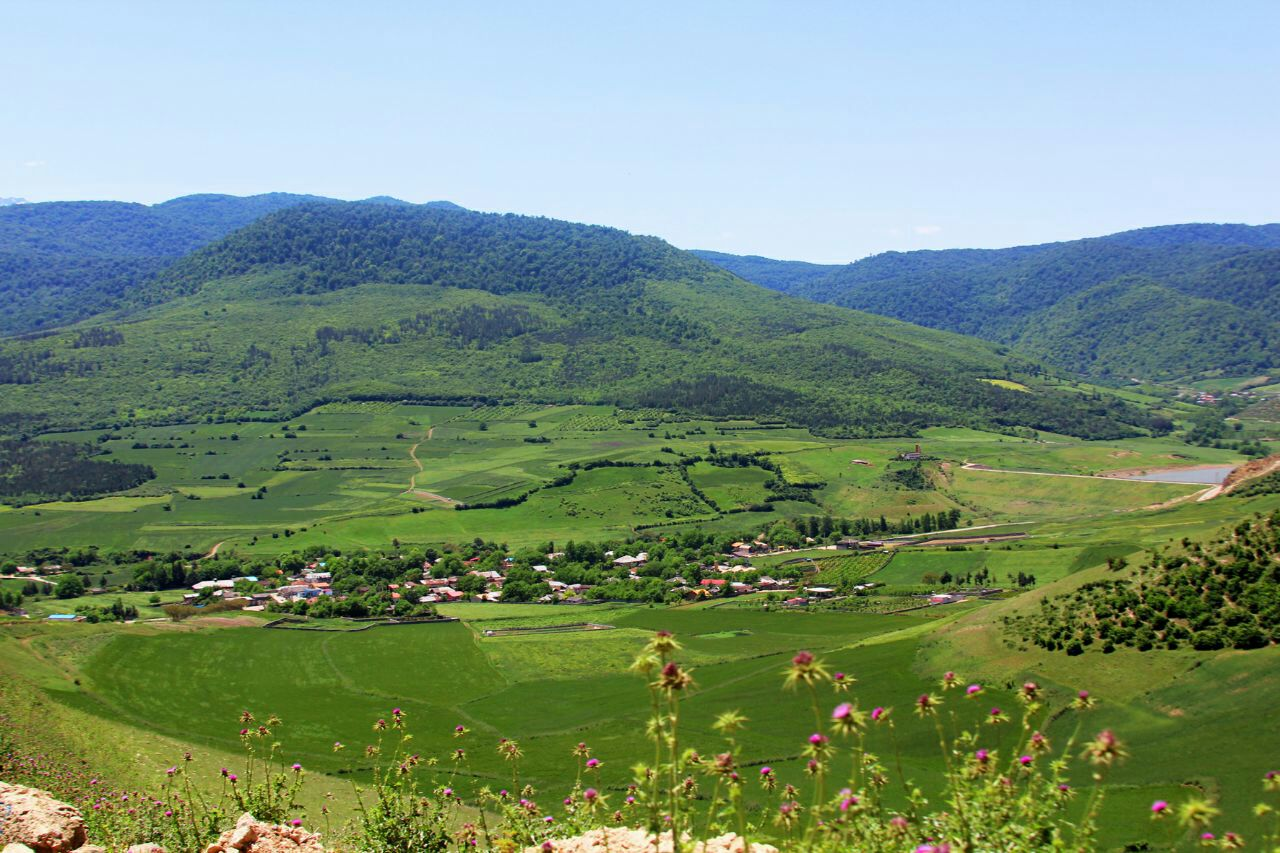
- The village of Maji

- Location within Iran
- Coordinates: 36°10′00″N 53°13′59″E
- Country: Iran
- Province: Mazandaran
- County: Sari
- District: Dodangeh
- Rural District: Farim

Population (2016)
  - Total: 279
- Time zone: UTC+3:30 (IRST)

Maji (Persian: مجی) (Note: Also romanized as Majī; also known as Majīd) is a village in Farim Rural District of Dodangeh District in Sari County, Mazandaran province, Iran.

== Demographics ==
=== Population ===
At the time of the 2006 National Census, the village's population was 259 in 67 households. The following census in 2011 counted 198 people in 67 households. The 2016 census measured the population of the village as 279 people in 107 households, the most populous in its rural district.

== See also ==
Media related to Maji, Iran at Wikimedia Commons
