= Jur Jadeh =

Village in Mazandaran province, Iran

Jur Jadeh Persian: جورجاده
- Village
- Location within Iran
- Coordinates: 36°05′51″N 53°15′13″E
- Country: Iran
- Province: Mazandaran
- County: Sari
- District: Dodangeh
- Rural District: Banaft

Population (2016)
  - Total: 120
- Time zone: UTC+3:30 (IRST)

Jur Jadeh (Persian: جورجاده) (Note: Also romanized as Jūr Jādeh) is a village in Banaft Rural District of Dodangeh District in Sari County, Mazandaran province, Iran.

== Demographics ==
=== Population ===
At the time of the 2006 National Census, the village's population was 181 in 54 households. The following census in 2011 counted 137 people in 53 households. The 2016 census measured the population of the village as 120 people in 52 households.
