= Aliabad, Sari =

Village in Mazandaran province, Iran

Aliabad Persian: علی آباد
- Village
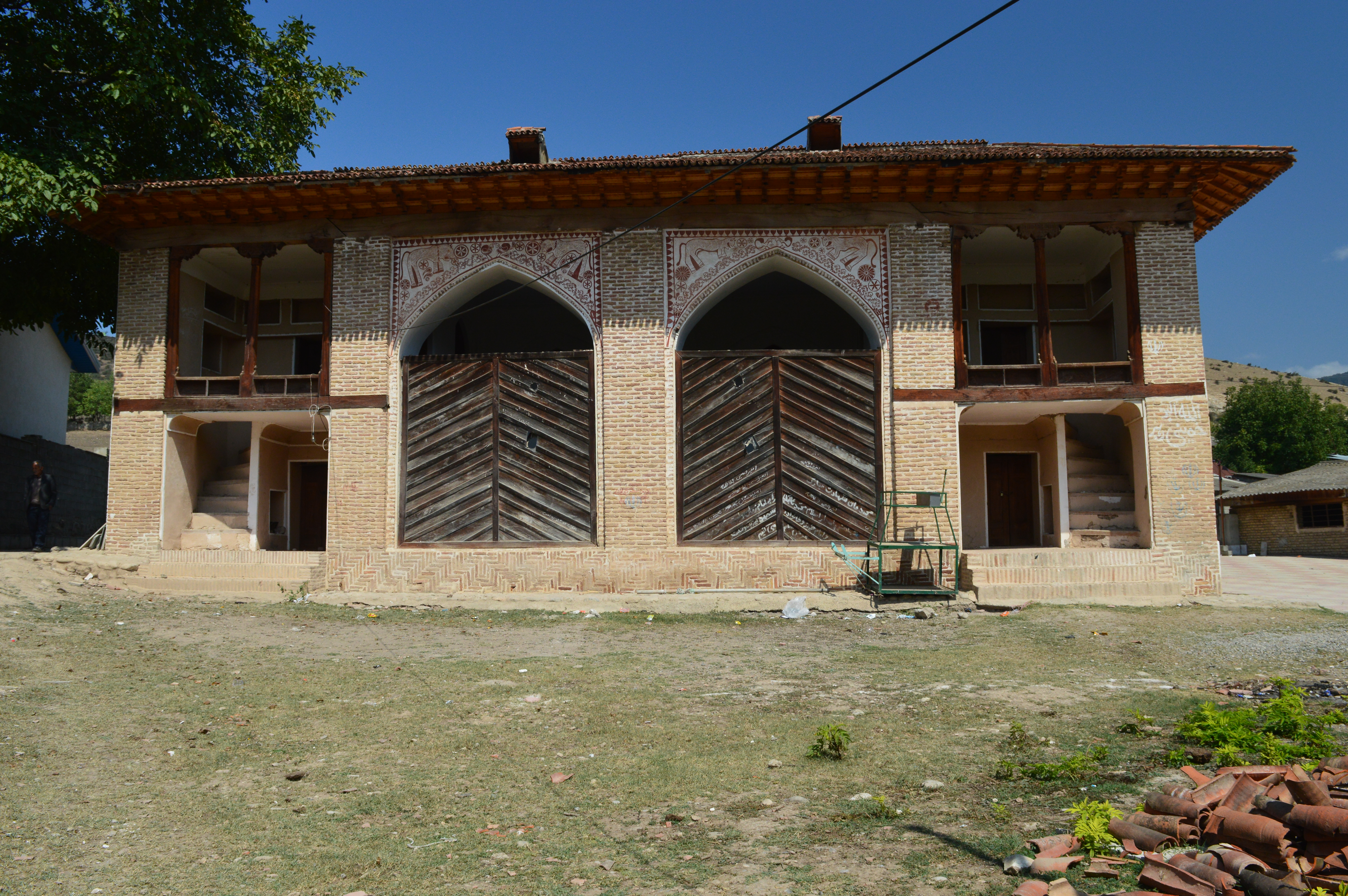
- Aliabad Dodangeh Mosque

- Location within Iran
- Coordinates: 36°10′11″N 53°19′42″E
- Country: Iran
- Province: Mazandaran
- County: Sari
- District: Dodangeh
- Rural District: Farim

Population (2016)
  - Total: 215
- Time zone: UTC+3:30 (IRST)

Aliabad (Persian: علی آباد) (Note: Also romanized as ‘Alīābād) is a village in Farim Rural District of Dodangeh District in Sari County, Mazandaran province, Iran.

== Demographics ==
=== Population ===
At the time of the 2006 National Census, the village's population was 162 in 49 households. The following census in 2011 counted 262 people in 57 households. The 2016 census measured the population of the village as 215 people in 56 households.
