= Qaran Sara =

Village in Mazandaran province, Iran

Qaran Sara Persian: قارن سرا
- Village
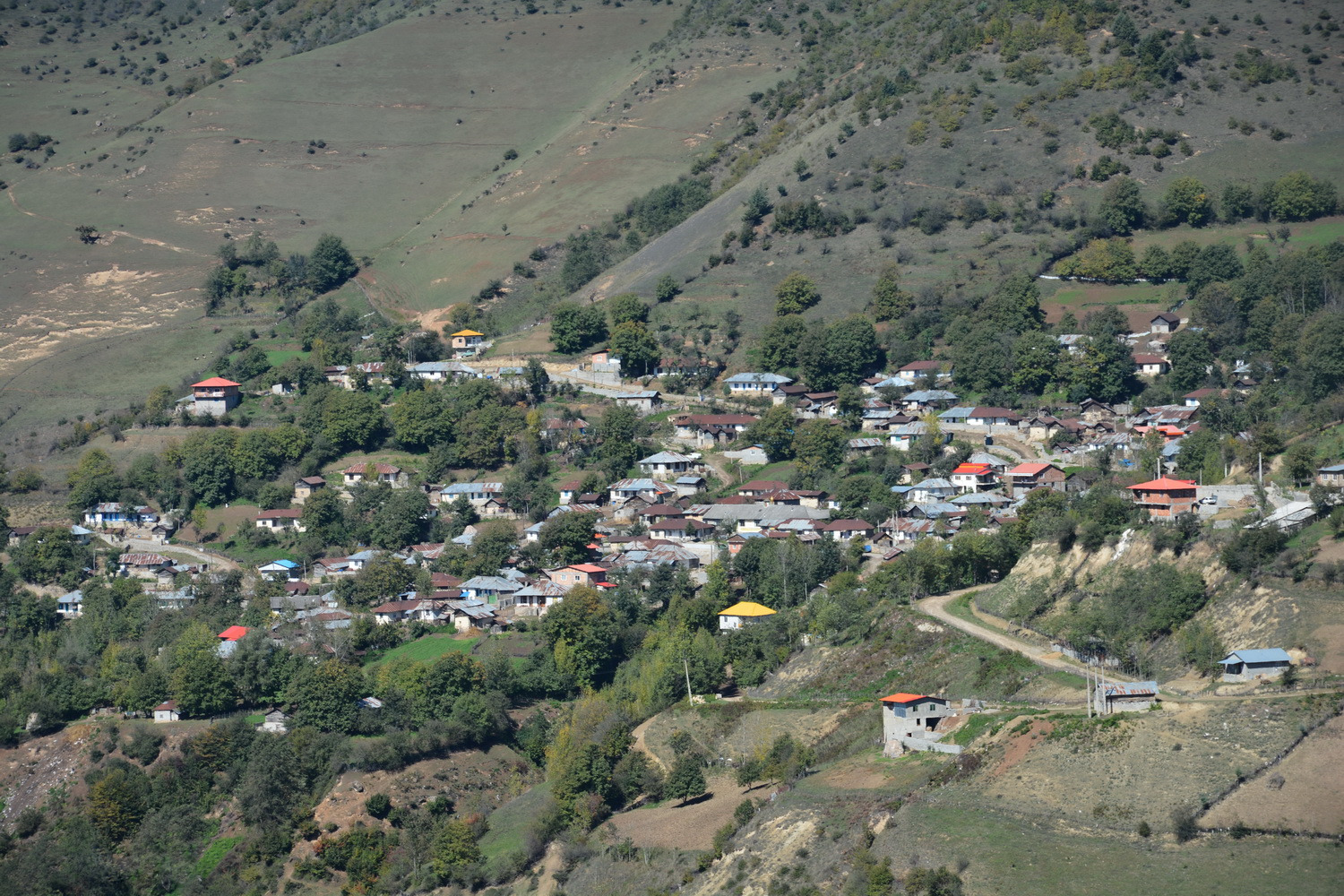
- The village of Qaran Sara

- Location within Iran
- Coordinates: 36°12′56″N 53°09′05″E
- Country: Iran
- Province: Mazandaran
- County: Sari
- District: Dodangeh
- Rural District: Farim

Population (2016)
  - Total: 229
- Time zone: UTC+3:30 (IRST)

Qaran Sara (Persian: قارن سرا) (Note: Also romanized as Qāran Sarā; also known as Qārūn Sarā (قارون سرا)) is a village in Farim Rural District of Dodangeh District in Sari County, Mazandaran province, Iran.

== Demographics ==
=== Population ===
At the time of the 2006 National Census, the village's population was 261 in 63 households. The following census in 2011 counted 177 people in 61 households. The 2016 census measured the population of the village as 229 people in 86 households.

== See also ==
Media related to Qaran Sara at Wikimedia Commons
