= Pasha Kola, Sari =

Pasha Kola پاشاكلا
- Village
- Location within Iran
- Coordinates: 36°11′27″N 53°09′56″E
- Country: Iran
- Province: Mazandaran
- County: Sari
- Bakhsh: Dodangeh
- Rural District: Farim

Population (2016)
  - Total: 111
- Time zone: UTC+3:30 (IRST)

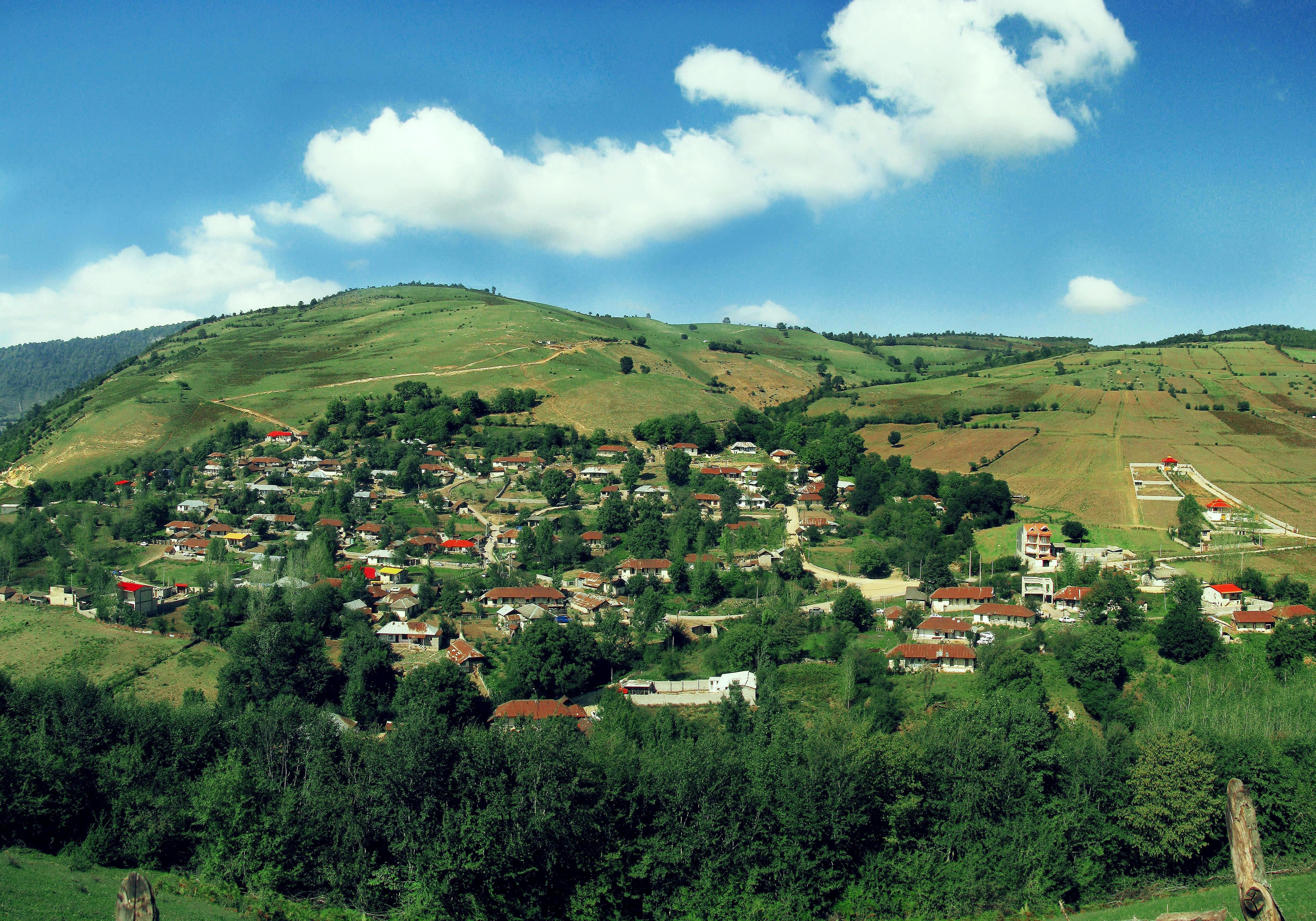
Pasha Kola, Sari

Pasha Kola (Persian: پاشاكلا, also Romanized as Pāshā Kolā and Pāshā Kalā) is a village in Farim Rural District, Dodangeh District, Sari County, Mazandaran Province, Iran. At the 2016 census, its population was 111, in 52 families. Up from 86 people in 2006.
