= Mula, Iran =

Mula مولا
- Village
- Location within Iran
- Coordinates: 36°11′34″N 53°20′37″E
- Country: Iran
- Province: Mazandaran
- County: Sari
- Bakhsh: Dodangeh
- Rural District: Farim

Population (2016)
  - Total: 59
- Time zone: UTC+3:30 (IRST)

Mula (Persian: مولا, also Romanized as Mūlā and Mowlā) is a village in Farim Rural District, Dodangeh District, Sari County, Mazandaran Province, Iran. At the 2006 census, its population was 59, in 24 families. Down from 65 in 2006.
