= Pahnedar =

Pahnedar پهندر
- Village
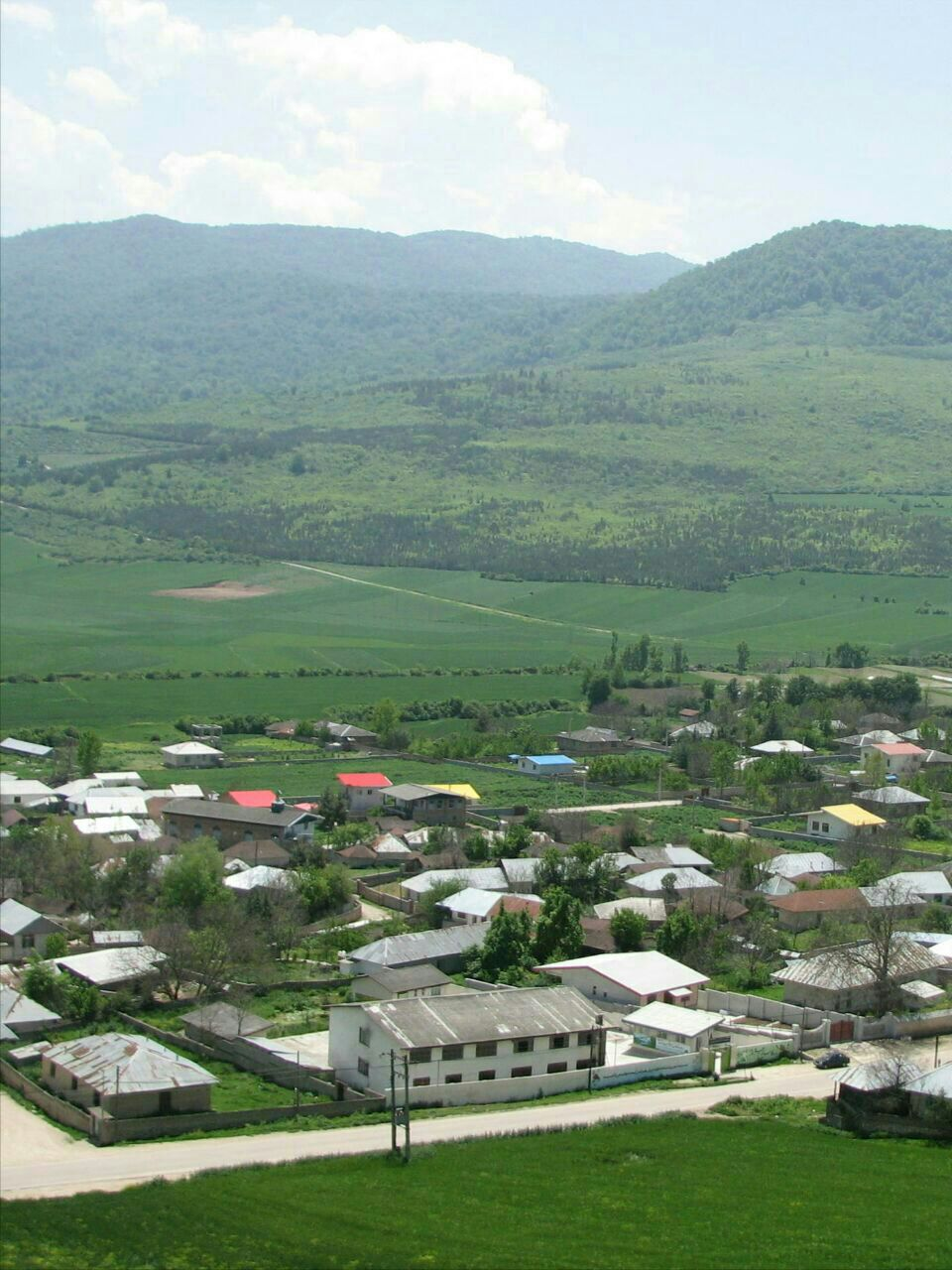

- Location within Iran
- Coordinates: 36°10′05″N 53°14′31″E
- Country: Iran
- Province: Mazandaran
- County: Sari
- Bakhsh: Dodangeh
- Rural District: Farim

Population (2016)
  - Total: 197
- Time zone: UTC+3:30 (IRST)

Pahnedar (Persian: پهندر, also Romanized as Pahn Dar) is a village in Farim Rural District, Dodangeh District, Sari County, Mazandaran Province, Iran. At the 2016 census, its population was 197, in 56 families. Decreased from 273 people in 2006.
