= Sar Kam =

Sar Kam سرکام
- Village
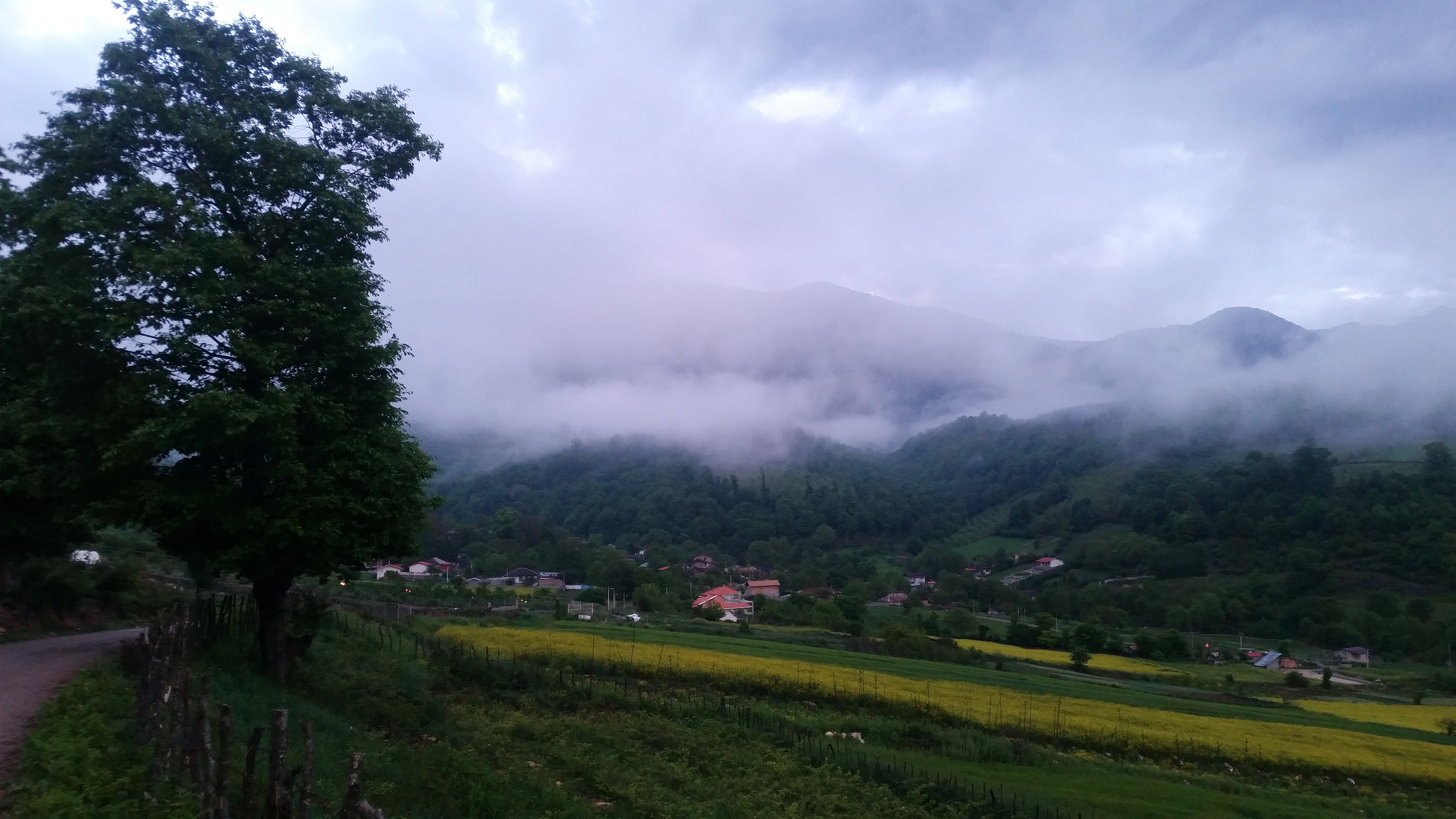

- Location within Iran
- Coordinates: 36°10′47″N 53°21′51″E
- Country: Iran
- Province: Mazandaran
- County: Sari
- Bakhsh: Dodangeh
- Rural District: Farim

Population (2016)
  - Total: 139
- Time zone: UTC+3:30 (IRST)

Sar Kam (Persian: سرکام, also Romanized as Sar Kām) is a village in Farim Rural District, Dodangeh District, Sari County, Mazandaran Province, Iran. At the 2016 census, its population was 139, in 50 families. Down from 142 in 2006.
