= Damir Kola =

Damir Kola دميركلا
- Village
- Location within Iran
- Coordinates: 36°11′58″N 53°14′55″E
- Country: Iran
- Province: Mazandaran
- County: Sari
- Bakhsh: Dodangeh
- Rural District: Farim

Population (2016)
  - Total: 14
- Time zone: UTC+3:30 (IRST)

Damir Kola (Persian: دميركلا, also Romanized as Damīr Kolā; also known as Do Mīr Kolā) is a village in Farim Rural District, Dodangeh District, Sari County, Mazandaran Province, Iran. At the 2006 census, its population was 14, in 6 families. Up from 12 in 2006.
