= Angeh Fam =

Angeh Fam انگه فام
- Village
- Location within Iran
- Coordinates: 36°10′47″N 53°21′11″E
- Country: Iran
- Province: Mazandaran
- County: Sari
- Bakhsh: Dodangeh
- Rural District: Farim

Population (2016)
  - Total: 38
- Time zone: UTC+3:30 (IRST)

Angeh Fam (Persian: انگه فام, also Romanized as Angeh Fām; also known as Angefām, Angeqām, and Angetām) is a village in Farim Rural District, Dodangeh District, Sari County, Mazandaran Province, Iran. At the 2016 census, its population was 38, in 16 families. Down from 58 people in 2006.
