= Barar Deh =

Barar Deh (Persian: برارده) may refer to:

- Barar Deh, Sari
- Barar Deh, Dodangeh, Sari County
