= Estakhr Sar, Sari =

Estakhr Sar استخرسر
- Village
- Location within Iran
- Coordinates: 36°11′11″N 53°13′34″E
- Country: Iran
- Province: Mazandaran
- County: Sari
- Bakhsh: Dodangeh
- Rural District: Farim

Population (2016)
  - Total: 82
- Time zone: UTC+3:30 (IRST)

Estakhr Sar (Persian: استخرسر) is a village in Farim Rural District, Dodangeh District, Sari County, Mazandaran Province, Iran. At the 2016 census, its population was 82, in 32 families. Up from 76 in 2006.
