= Vazmela =

Village in Mazandaran province, Iran

Vezmela Persian: وِزملا
- Village
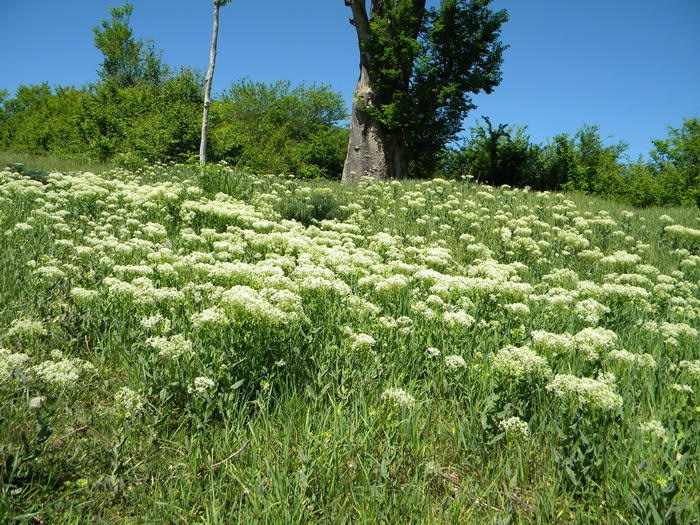
- The village of Vezmela

- Location within Iran
- Coordinates: 36°04′39″N 53°11′16″E
- Country: Iran
- Province: Mazandaran
- County: Sari
- District: Dodangeh
- Rural District: Banaft

Population (2016)
  - Total: 146
- Time zone: UTC+3:30 (IRST)

Vezmela (Persian: وزملا) (Note: Also romanized as Vezmelā and Vez Mollā) is a village in Banaft Rural District of Dodangeh District in Sari County, Mazandaran province, Iran.

== Demographics ==
=== Population ===
At the time of the 2006 National Census, the village's population was 148 in 40 households. The following census in 2011 counted 136 people in 42 households. The 2016 census measured the population of the village as 146 people in 47 households.
