= Khvosh Neshan =

Khvosh Neshan خوش نشان
- Village
- Location within Iran
- Coordinates: 36°09′00″N 53°18′00″E
- Country: Iran
- Province: Mazandaran
- County: Sari
- Bakhsh: Dodangeh
- Rural District: Farim

Population (2016)
  - Total: 24
- Time zone: UTC+3:30 (IRST)

Khvosh Neshan (Persian: خوش نشان, also Romanized as Khvosh Neshān) is a village in Farim Rural District, Dodangeh District, Sari County, Mazandaran Province, Iran. At the 2016 census, its population was 24, in 14 families. Down from 38 in 2006.
