= Jafarabad, Sari =

Jafarabad جعفراباد
- Village
- Location within Iran
- Coordinates: 36°10′04″N 53°20′29″E
- Country: Iran
- Province: Mazandaran
- County: Sari
- Bakhsh: Dodangeh
- Rural District: Farim

Population (2016)
  - Total: 50
- Time zone: UTC+3:30 (IRST)

Jafarabad (Persian: جعفراباد, also Romanized as Ja‘farābād) is a village in Farim Rural District, Dodangeh District, Sari County, Mazandaran Province, Iran. At the 2006 census, its population was 50, in 20 families. Up from 45 in 2006.
