= Talaram =

Talaram or Telaram (Persian: تلارم) may refer to:

- Telaram, Mahmudabad
- Talaram, Sari
