= Jijad =

Village in Mazandaran province, Iran

Jijad Persian: جیجاد
- Village
- Location within Iran
- Coordinates: 36°06′53″N 53°16′14″E
- Country: Iran
- Province: Mazandaran
- County: Sari
- District: Dodangeh
- Rural District: Banaft

Population (2016)
  - Total: 11
- Time zone: UTC+3:30 (IRST)

Jijad (Persian: جیجاد) (Note: Also romanized as Jījād) is a village in Banaft Rural District of Dodangeh District in Sari County, Mazandaran province, Iran.

== Demographics ==
=== Population ===
Jijad Population History
Year	Pop.	±%
1976	48	—
1986	43	−10.4%
2006	not reported	—
2011	8	—
2016	11	+37.5%

According to the 1986 census, Jijad had 11 households. Its agricultural activities included farming and animal husbandry. The village had tap water and power, but it did not have any schools or healthcare facilities.

At the time of the 2006 National Census, the village's population was below the reporting threshold. The following census in 2011 counted eight people in four households. The 2016 census measured the population of the village as 11 people in five households.
