= Vav Darreh =

Vav Darreh واودره
- Village
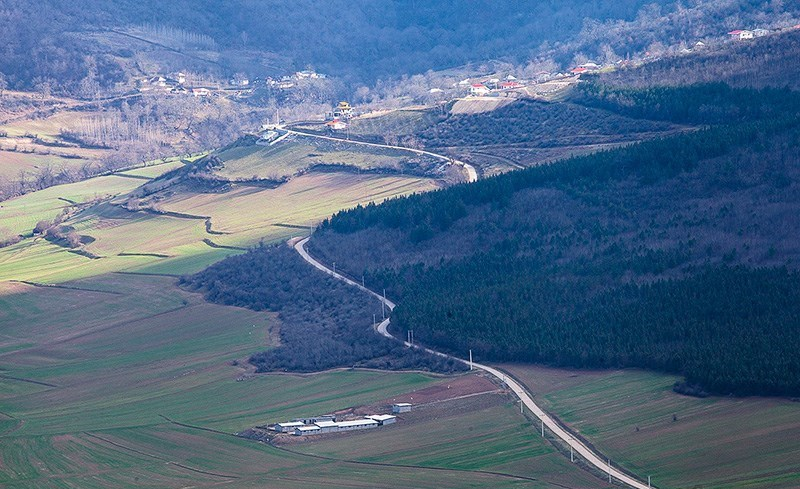

- Location within Iran
- Coordinates: 36°08′52″N 53°14′40″E
- Country: Iran
- Province: Mazandaran
- County: Sari
- Bakhsh: Dodangeh
- Rural District: Farim

Population (2006)
  - Total: 112
- Time zone: UTC+3:30 (IRST)

Vav Darreh (Persian: واودره, also Romanized as Vāv Darreh; also known as Vāv Darreh Bozorg and Vāv Darreh-ye Bozorg) is a village in Farim Rural District, Dodangeh District, Sari County, Mazandaran Province, Iran. At the 2016 census, its population was 96, in 40 families.
