= Bisheh Kola =

Bisheh Kola or Bisheh Kala (Persian: بيشه كلا) may refer to:

- Bisheh Kola, Mahmudabad
- Bisheh Kola, Sari
