= Darzi Kola, Sari =

Village in Mazandaran province, Iran

Darzi Kola Persian: درزيكلا
- Village
- Location within Iran
- Coordinates: 36°04′17″N 53°12′08″E
- Country: Iran
- Province: Mazandaran
- County: Sari
- District: Dodangeh
- Rural District: Banaft

Population (2016)
  - Total: 155
- Time zone: UTC+3:30 (IRST)

Darzi Kola (Persian: درزيكلا) (Note: Also romanized as Darzī Kalā and Darzī Kolā; also known as Darzī Kūlā) is a village in Banaft Rural District of Dodangeh District in Sari County, Mazandaran province, Iran.

== Demographics ==
=== Population ===
At the time of the 2006 National Census, the village's population was 123 in 35 households. The following census in 2011 counted 191 people in 61 households. The 2016 census measured the population of the village as 155 people in 58 households.
