= Part-e Kola =

Village in Mazandaran province, Iran

Part-e Kola Persian: پارت كلا
- Village
- Location within Iran
- Coordinates: 36°09′36″N 53°21′16″E
- Country: Iran
- Province: Mazandaran
- County: Sari
- District: Dodangeh
- Rural District: Farim

Population (2016)
  - Total: 212
- Time zone: UTC+3:30 (IRST)

Part-e Kola (Persian: پارت كلا) (Note: Also romanized as Pārt Kalā, Pārt Kolā, and Pārt-e Kolā) is a village in Farim Rural District of Dodangeh District in Sari County, Mazandaran province, Iran.

== Demographics ==
=== Population ===
At the time of the 2006 National Census, the village's population was 221 in 59 households. The following census in 2011 counted 177 people in 56 households. The 2016 census measured the population of the village as 212 people in 72 households.
