= Damad Kola =

Damad Kola دامادكلا
- Village
- Location within Iran
- Coordinates: 36°11′42″N 53°13′29″E
- Country: Iran
- Province: Mazandaran
- County: Sari
- Bakhsh: Dodangeh
- Rural District: Farim

Population (2016)
  - Total: 71
- Time zone: UTC+3:30 (IRST)

Damad Kola (Persian: دامادكلا, also Romanized as Dāmād Kolā) is a village in Farim Rural District, Dodangeh District, Sari County, Mazandaran Province, Iran. At the 2016 census, its population was 71, in 29 families. Up from 44 people in 2006.
