= Kolamak =

Kolamak كلامك
- Village
- Location within Iran
- Coordinates: 36°09′38″N 53°16′33″E
- Country: Iran
- Province: Mazandaran
- County: Sari
- Bakhsh: Dodangeh
- Rural District: Farim

Population (2016)
  - Total: 52
- Time zone: UTC+3:30 (IRST)

Kolamak (Persian: كلامك, also Romanized as Kolāmak; also known as Kolmak, Kolūmak, and Kūlūmak) is a village in Farim Rural District, Dodangeh District, Sari County, Mazandaran Province, Iran. At the 2016 census, its population was 52, in 21 families. Up from 51 in 2006.
