= Talavak =

Village in Mazandaran province, Iran

Talavak Persian: تلاوك
- Village
- Location within Iran
- Coordinates: 36°11′06″N 53°14′04″E
- Country: Iran
- Province: Mazandaran
- County: Sari
- District: Dodangeh
- Rural District: Farim

Population (2016)
  - Total: 236
- Time zone: UTC+3:30 (IRST)

Talavak (Persian: تلاوك) (Note: Also romanized as Talāvak and Talāvok) is a village in Farim Rural District of Dodangeh District in Sari County, Mazandaran province, Iran.

== Demographics ==
=== Population ===
At the time of the 2006 National Census, the village's population was 207 in 67 households. The following census in 2011 counted 200 people in 64 households. The 2016 census measured the population of the village as 236 people in 90 households.
