= Shelimak =

Shelimak شليمك
- Village
- Location within Iran
- Coordinates: 36°11′33″N 53°09′20″E
- Country: Iran
- Province: Mazandaran
- County: Sari
- Bakhsh: Dodangeh
- Rural District: Farim

Population (2016)
  - Total: 56
- Time zone: UTC+3:30 (IRST)

Shelimak (Persian: شليمك, also Romanized as Shelīmak and Shalīmak; also known as Shalmak and Shīlmak) is a village in Farim Rural District, Dodangeh District, Sari County, Mazandaran Province, Iran. At the 2016 census, its population was 56, in 33 families. Down from 68 in 2006.
