= Maskupa =

Maskupa مسكوپا
- Village
- Location within Iran
- Coordinates: 36°12′55″N 53°19′16″E
- Country: Iran
- Province: Mazandaran
- County: Sari
- Bakhsh: Dodangeh
- Rural District: Farim

Population (2016)
  - Total: 146
- Time zone: UTC+3:30 (IRST)

Maskupa (Persian: مسكوپا, also Romanized as Maskūpā) is a village in Farim Rural District, Dodangeh District, Sari County, Mazandaran Province, Iran. At the 2016 census, its population was 146, in 60 families. Down from 175 people in 2006.
