= Margav =

Margav (Persian: مرگاو) may refer to:

- Margav-e Olya
- Margav-e Sofla
