= Dineh Sar =

Village in Mazandaran, Iran

Dineh Sar دينه سر
- Village
- Location within Iran
- Coordinates: 36°09′44″N 53°20′05″E
- Country: Iran
- Province: Mazandaran
- County: Sari
- Bakhsh: Dodangeh
- Rural District: Farim

Population (2016)
  - Total: 104
- Time zone: UTC+3:30 (IRST)

Dineh Sar (Persian: دينه سر, also Romanized as Dīneh Sar) is a village in Farim Rural District, Dodangeh District, Sari County, Mazandaran Province, Iran. At the 2016 census, its population was 104, in 44 families. Down from 157 people in 2006.
