= Siah Dasht-e Sofla =

Siah Dasht-e Sofla سياه دشت سفلي
- Village
- Location within Iran
- Coordinates: 36°09′23″N 53°17′50″E
- Country: Iran
- Province: Mazandaran
- County: Sari
- Bakhsh: Dodangeh
- Rural District: Farim

Population (2016)
  - Total: 101
- Time zone: UTC+3:30 (IRST)

Siah Dasht-e Sofla (Persian: سياه دشت سفلي, also Romanized as Sīāh Dasht-e Soflá; also known as Sīāh Dasht-e Pā’īn) is a village in Farim Rural District, Dodangeh District, Sari County, Mazandaran Province, Iran. At the 2016 census, its population was 101, in 45 families. Increased from 66 people in 2006.
