= Emamzadeh Ali (Emamzadeh Ali Farim) =

Village in Mazandaran province, Iran

Emamzadeh Ali Persian: امامزاده علي
- Village
- Location within Iran
- Coordinates: 36°11′15″N 53°17′26″E
- Country: Iran
- Province: Mazandaran
- County: Sari
- District: Dodangeh
- Rural District: Farim

Population (2016)
  - Total: 239
- Time zone: UTC+3:30 (IRST)

Emamzadeh Ali (Persian: امامزاده علي) (Note: Also romanized as Emāmzādeh ‘Alī; also known as Emāmzādeh ‘Alī Farīm) is a village in Farim Rural District of Dodangeh District in Sari County, Mazandaran province, Iran.

== Demographics ==
=== Population ===
At the time of the 2006 National Census, the village's population was 127 in 40 households. The following census in 2011 counted 160 people in 37 households. The 2016 census measured the population of the village as 239 people in 65 households.
