= Valik Chal =

Village in Mazandaran province, Iran

Valik Chal Persian: ولیک چال
- Village
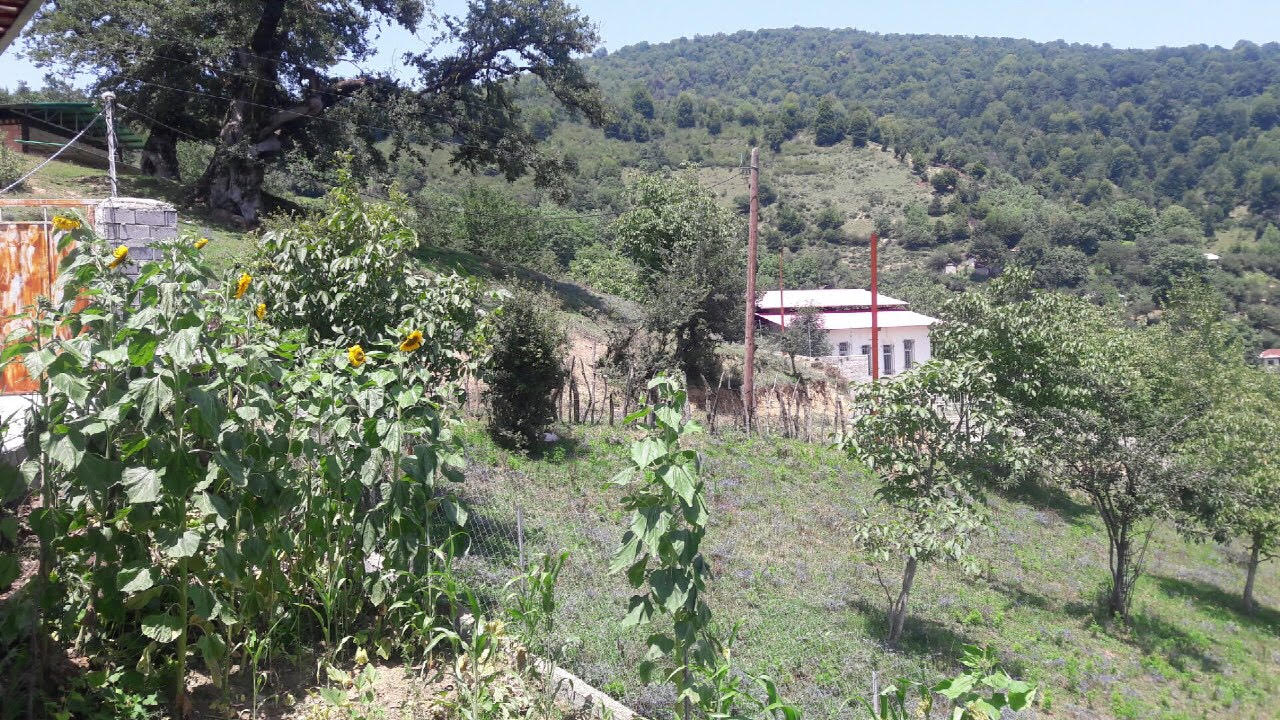
- The village of Valik Chal

- Location within Iran
- Coordinates: 36°05′51″N 53°13′02″E
- Country: Iran
- Province: Mazandaran
- County: Sari
- District: Dodangeh
- Rural District: Banaft

Population (2016)
  - Total: 104
- Time zone: UTC+3:30 (IRST)

Valik Chal (Persian: وليک چال) (Note: Also romanized as Valīk Chāl) is a village in Banaft Rural District of Dodangeh District in Sari County, Mazandaran province, Iran.

== Demographics ==
=== Population ===
At the time of the 2006 National Census, the village's population was 67 in 15 households. The following census in 2011 counted 39 people in 16 households. The 2016 census measured the population of the village as 104 people in 34 households.
