= Mateh Kola, Sari =

Mateh Kola مته كلا
- Village
- Location within Iran
- Coordinates: 36°08′40″N 53°16′28″E
- Country: Iran
- Province: Mazandaran
- County: Sari
- Bakhsh: Dodangeh
- Rural District: Farim

Population (2016)
  - Total: 49
- Time zone: UTC+3:30 (IRST)

Mateh Kola (Persian: مته كلا, also Romanized as Mateh Kolā; also known as Mat Kalā and Mat Kolā) is a village in Farim Rural District, Dodangeh District, Sari County, Mazandaran Province, Iran. At the 2016 census, its population was 49, in 22 families. Decreased from 82 people in 2006.
