= Talaram, Sari =

Talaram تلارم
- Village
- Location within Iran
- Coordinates: 36°12′04″N 53°15′14″E
- Country: Iran
- Province: Mazandaran
- County: Sari
- Bakhsh: Dodangeh
- Rural District: Farim

Population (2016)
  - Total: 71
- Time zone: UTC+3:30 (IRST)

Talaram (Persian: تلارم, also Romanized as Talāram) is a village in Farim Rural District, Dodangeh District, Sari County, Mazandaran Province, Iran. At the 2006 census, its population was 71, in 34families. Increased from 27 people in 2006.
