= Siah Dasht-e Olya =

Siah Dasht-e Olya سياه دشت عليا
- Village
- Location within Iran
- Coordinates: 36°08′50″N 53°17′31″E
- Country: Iran
- Province: Mazandaran
- County: Sari
- Bakhsh: Dodangeh
- Rural District: Farim

Population (2016)
  - Total: 11
- Time zone: UTC+3:30 (IRST)

Siah Dasht-e Olya (Persian: سياه دشت عليا, also Romanized as Sīāh Dasht-e ‘Olyā; also known as Sīāh Dasht-e Bālā) is a village in Farim Rural District, Dodangeh District, Sari County, Mazandaran Province, Iran. At the 2016 census, its population was 11, in 5 families. Decreased from 22 people in 2006.
