= Valik Bon =

Village in Mazandaran province, Iran

Valik Bon Persian: ولیک بن
- Village
- Location within Iran
- Coordinates: 36°05′34″N 53°10′04″E
- Country: Iran
- Province: Mazandaran
- County: Sari
- District: Dodangeh
- Rural District: Banaft

Population (2016)
  - Total: 74
- Time zone: UTC+3:30 (IRST)

Valik Bon (Persian: ولیک بن) (Note: Also romanized as Valīk Bon; also known as Valīk) is a village in Banaft Rural District of Dodangeh District in Sari County, Mazandaran province, Iran.

== Demographics ==
=== Population ===
At the time of the 2006 National Census, the village's population was 92 in 26 households. The following census in 2011 counted 68 people in 24 households. The 2016 census measured the population of the village as 74 people in 32 households.
