= Resket-e Olya =

Resket-e Olya رسكت عليا
- Village
- Location within Iran
- Coordinates: 36°09′57″N 53°10′38″E
- Country: Iran
- Province: Mazandaran
- County: Sari
- Bakhsh: Dodangeh
- Rural District: Farim

Population (2016)
  - Total: 121
- Time zone: UTC+3:30 (IRST)

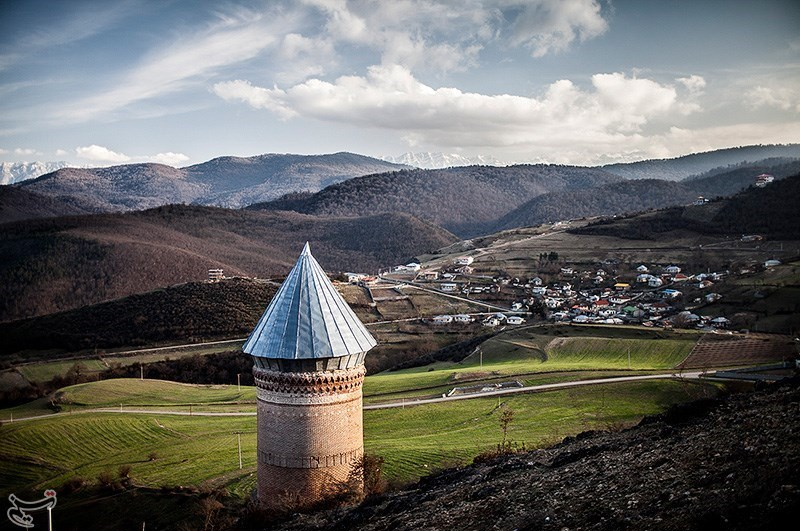
Resket Tower and Village

Resket-e Olya (Persian: رسكت عليا, also Romanized as Resket-e ‘Olyā; also known as Bālā Raskat, Bālā Resket, and Resket) is a village in Farim Rural District, Dodangeh District, Sari County, Mazandaran Province, Iran. At the 2016 census, its population was 121, in 55 families, down from 206 people in 2006.
