= Bisheh Kola, Sari =

Bisheh Kola بيشه كلا
- Village
- Location within Iran
- Coordinates: 36°11′10″N 53°10′04″E
- Country: Iran
- Province: Mazandaran
- County: Sari
- Bakhsh: Dodangeh
- Rural District: Farim

Population (2016)
  - Total: 57
- Time zone: UTC+3:30 (IRST)

Bisheh Kola (Persian: بيشه كلا, also Romanized as Bīsheh Kolā) is a village in Farim Rural District, Dodangeh District, Sari County, Mazandaran Province, Iran. At the 2016 census, its population was 57, in 25 families. Down from 62 in 2006.
