= Resket-e Sofla =

Resket-e Sofla رسکت سفلی
- Village
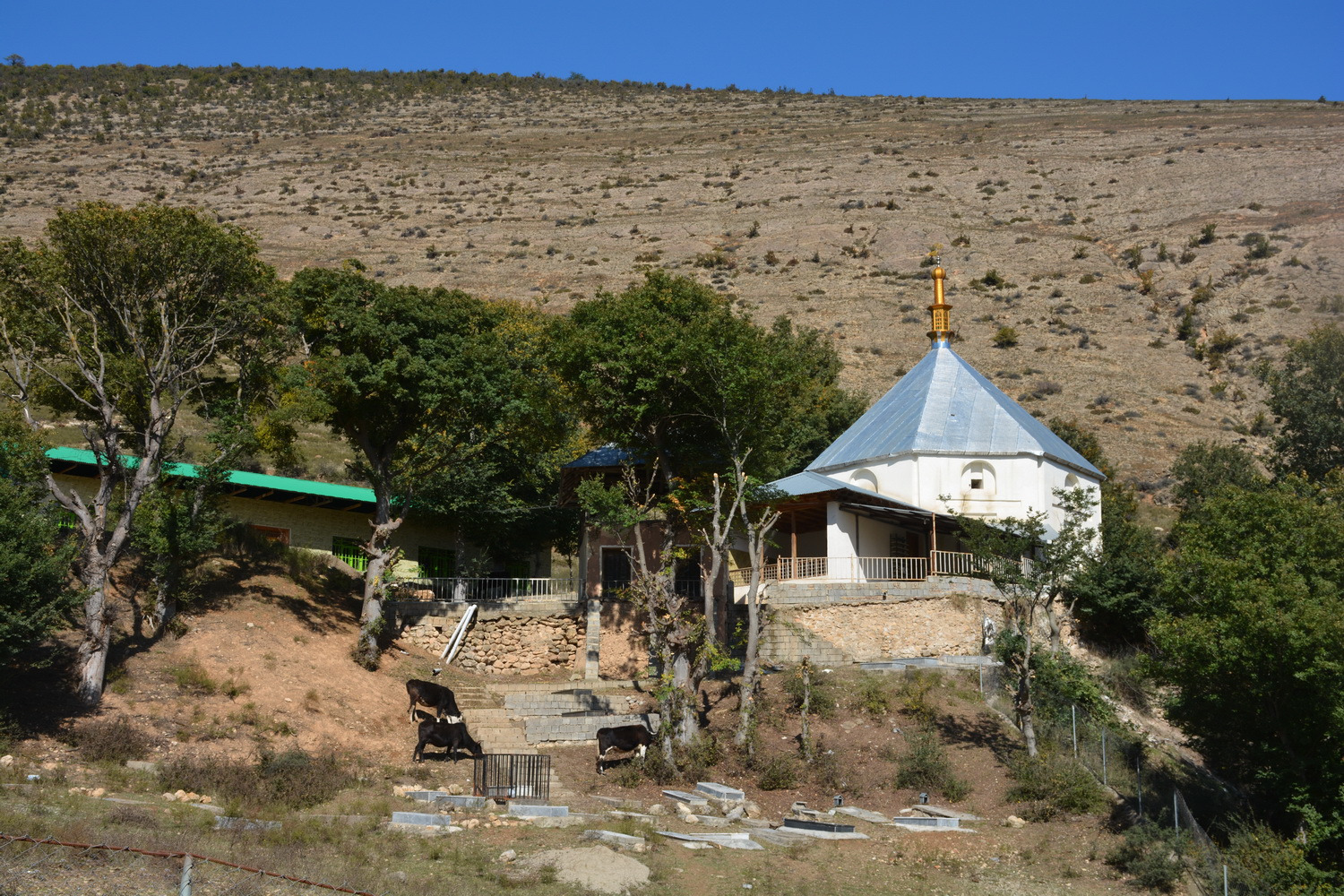

- Location within Iran
- Coordinates: 36°09′40″N 53°11′32″E
- Country: Iran
- Province: Mazandaran
- County: Sari
- Bakhsh: Dodangeh
- Rural District: Farim

Population (2016)
  - Total: 110
- Time zone: UTC+3:30 (IRST)

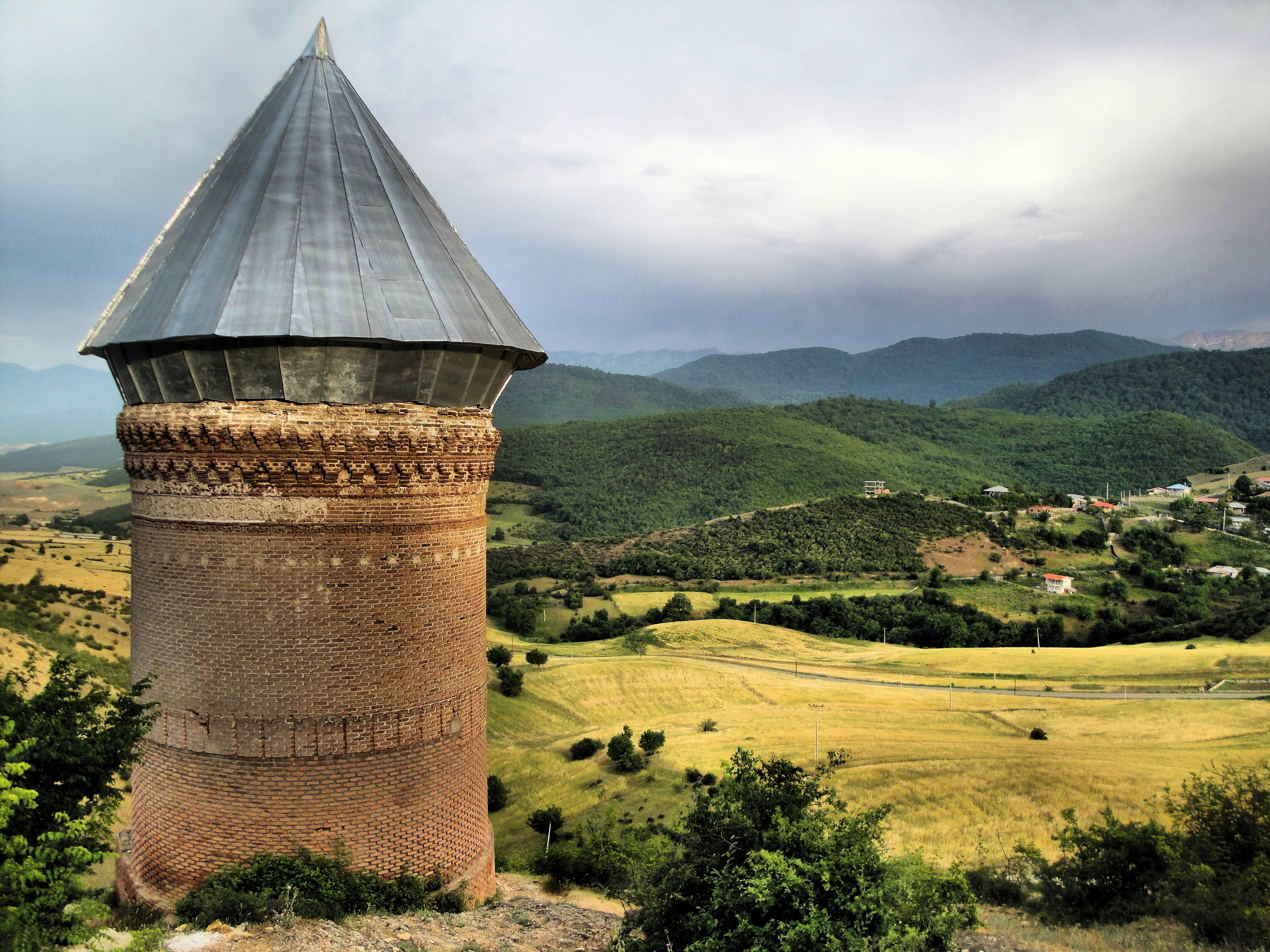
Resket Tower

Resket-e Sofla (Persian: رسکت سفلی, also Romanized as Resket-e Soflá; also known as Pā’īn Resket) is a village in Farim Rural District, Dodangeh District, Sari County, Mazandaran Province, Iran. At the 2016 census, its population was 110, in 42 families. Increased from 49 people in 2006.
