= Korasb =

Village in Mazandaran province, Iran

Korasb Persian: كرسب
- Village
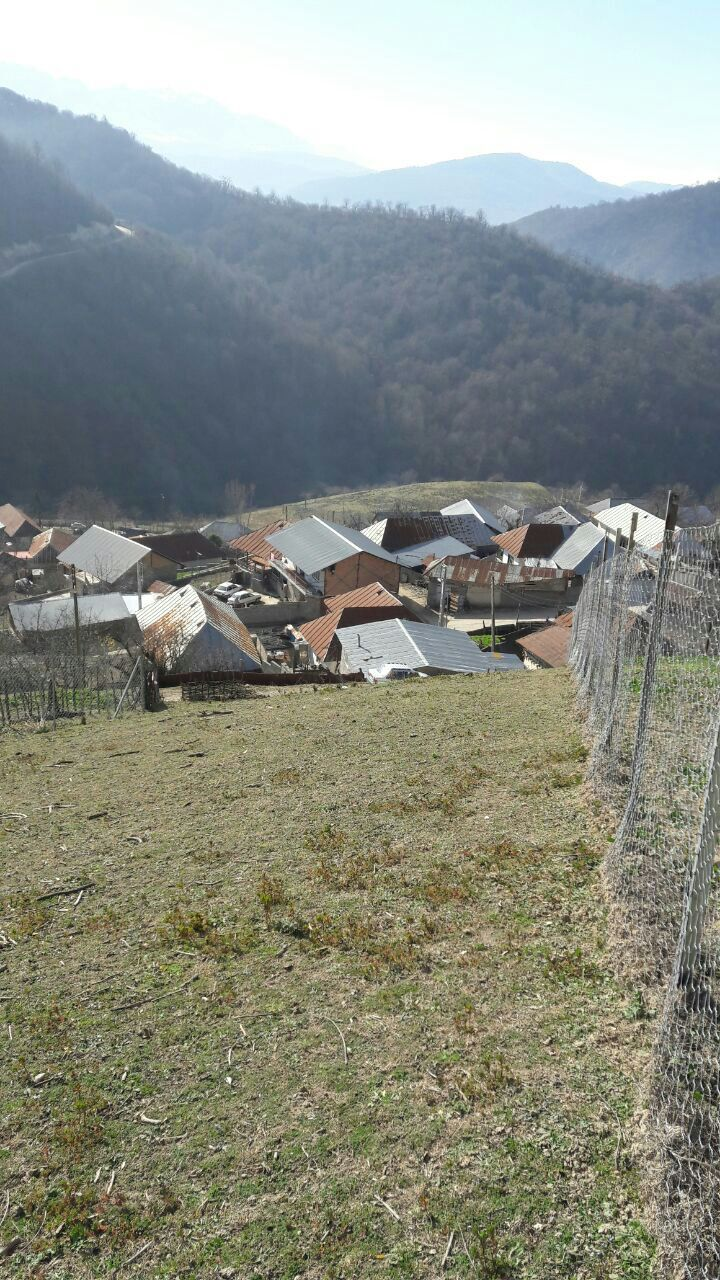
- The village of Korasb

- Location within Iran
- Coordinates: 36°12′30″N 53°19′54″E
- Country: Iran
- Province: Mazandaran
- County: Sari
- District: Dodangeh
- Rural District: Farim

Population (2016)
  - Total: 217
- Time zone: UTC+3:30 (IRST)

Korasb (Persian: كرسب) (Note: Also romanized as Korāsb; also known as Korash) is a village in Farim Rural District of Dodangeh District in Sari County, Mazandaran province, Iran.

== Demographics ==
=== Population ===
At the time of the 2006 National Census, the village's population was 197 in 56 households. The following census in 2011 counted 168 people in 55 households. The 2016 census measured the population of the village as 217 people in 78 households.
