= Par Kuh, Mazandaran =

Par Kuh پركوه
- Village
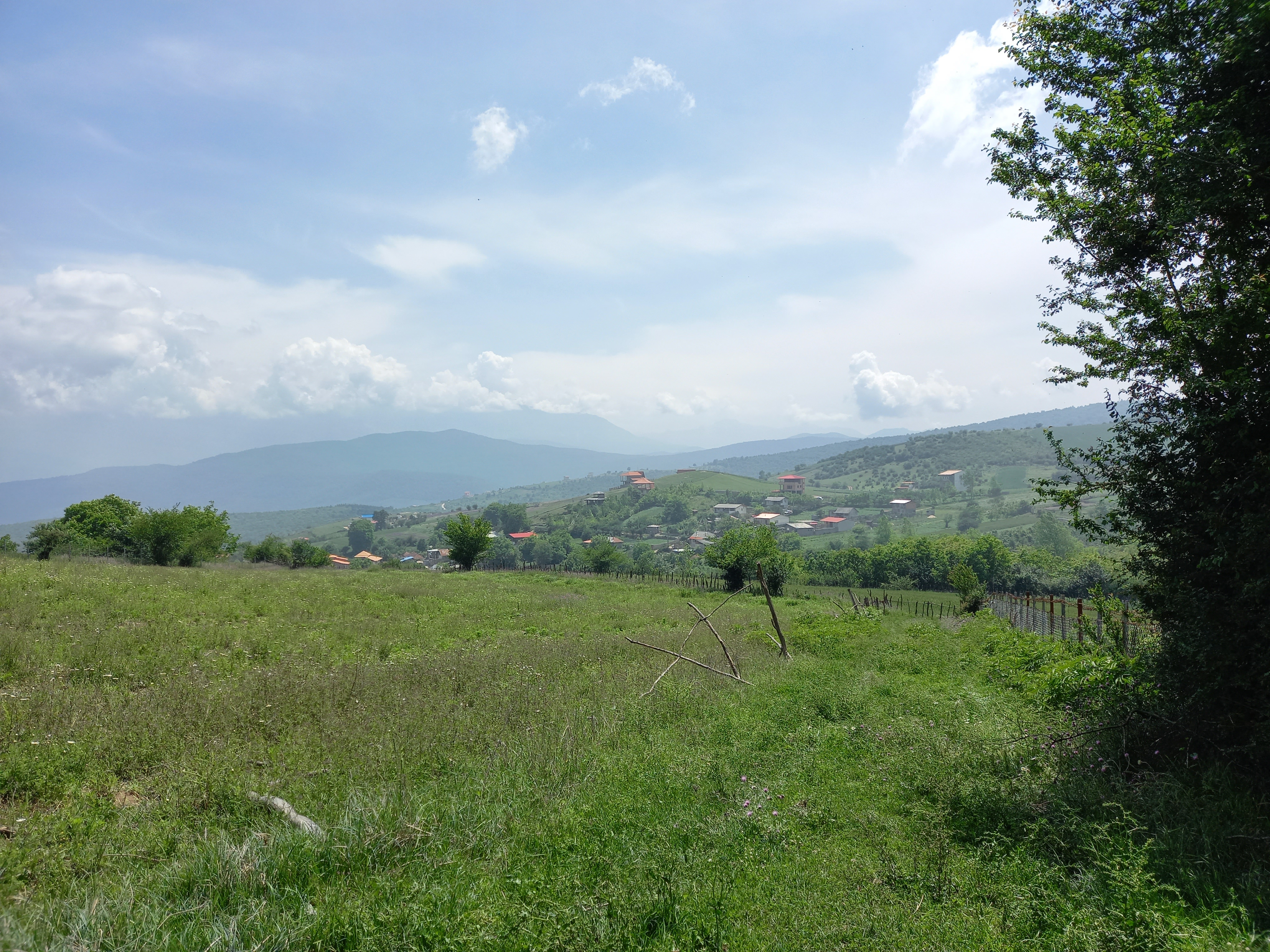

- Location within Iran
- Coordinates: 36°12′20″N 53°14′00″E
- Country: Iran
- Province: Mazandaran
- County: Sari
- Bakhsh: Dodangeh
- Rural District: Farim

Population (2016)
  - Total: 87
- Time zone: UTC+3:30 (IRST)

Par Kuh (Mazanderani: پركوه, also Romanized as Par Kūh) is a village in Farim Rural District, Dodangeh District, Sari County, Mazandaran Province, Iran. At the 2016 census, its population was 87, in 32 families.
