= Emamzadeh Ali Akbar =

Emamzadeh Ali Akbar or Emamzadeh Aliakbar (Persian: امامزاده علي اكبر) may refer to:

- Emamzadeh Ali Akbar, Fars
- Emamzadeh Aliakbar, Isfahan
- Emamzadeh Ali Akbar, Semnan
