= Margav-e Sofla =

Margav-e Sofla مرگاو سفلی
- Village
- Location within Iran
- Coordinates: 36°11′06″N 53°11′25″E
- Country: Iran
- Province: Mazandaran
- County: Sari
- Bakhsh: Dodangeh
- Rural District: Farim

Population (2016)
  - Total: 101
- Time zone: UTC+3:30 (IRST)

Margav-e Sofla (Persian: مرگاو سفلی, also Romanized as Margāv-e Soflá; also known as Margāb-e Soflá) is a village in Farim Rural District, Dodangeh District, Sari County, Mazandaran Province, Iran. At the 2016 census, its population was 101, in 42 families. Down from 106 in 2006.
