= Barar Deh, Dodangeh =

Barar Deh برارده
- Village
- Location within Iran
- Coordinates: 36°08′38″N 53°18′25″E
- Country: Iran
- Province: Mazandaran
- County: Sari
- Bakhsh: Dodangeh
- Rural District: Farim

Population (2016)
  - Total: 41
- Time zone: UTC+3:30 (IRST)

Barar Deh (Persian: برارده, also Romanized as Bārār Deh; also known as Barān Deh) is a village in Farim Rural District, Dodangeh District, Sari County, Mazandaran Province, Iran. At the 2016 census, its population was 41, in 17 families. Down from 69 people in 2006.
