= Emamzadeh Ali (Emamzadeh Ali-ye Shelimak) =

Village in Mazandaran province, Iran

Emamzadeh Ali Persian: امامزاده علي
- Village
- Location within Iran
- Coordinates: 36°11′23″N 53°09′32″E
- Country: Iran
- Province: Mazandaran
- County: Sari
- District: Dodangeh
- Rural District: Farim

Population (2016)
  - Total: 50
- Time zone: UTC+3:30 (IRST)

Emamzadeh Ali (Persian: امامزاده علي) (Note: Also romanized as Emāmzādeh ‘Alī; also known as Emāmzādeh ‘Alī-ye Shelīmak) is a village in Farim Rural District of Dodangeh District in Sari County, Mazandaran province, Iran.

== Demographics ==
=== Population ===
At the time of the 2006 National Census, the village's population was 24 in eight households. The following census in 2011 counted 13 people in seven households. The 2016 census measured the population of the village as 50 people in 19 households.
