= Sud Kola =

Village in Mazandaran province, Iran

Sud Kola Persian: سودكلا
- Village
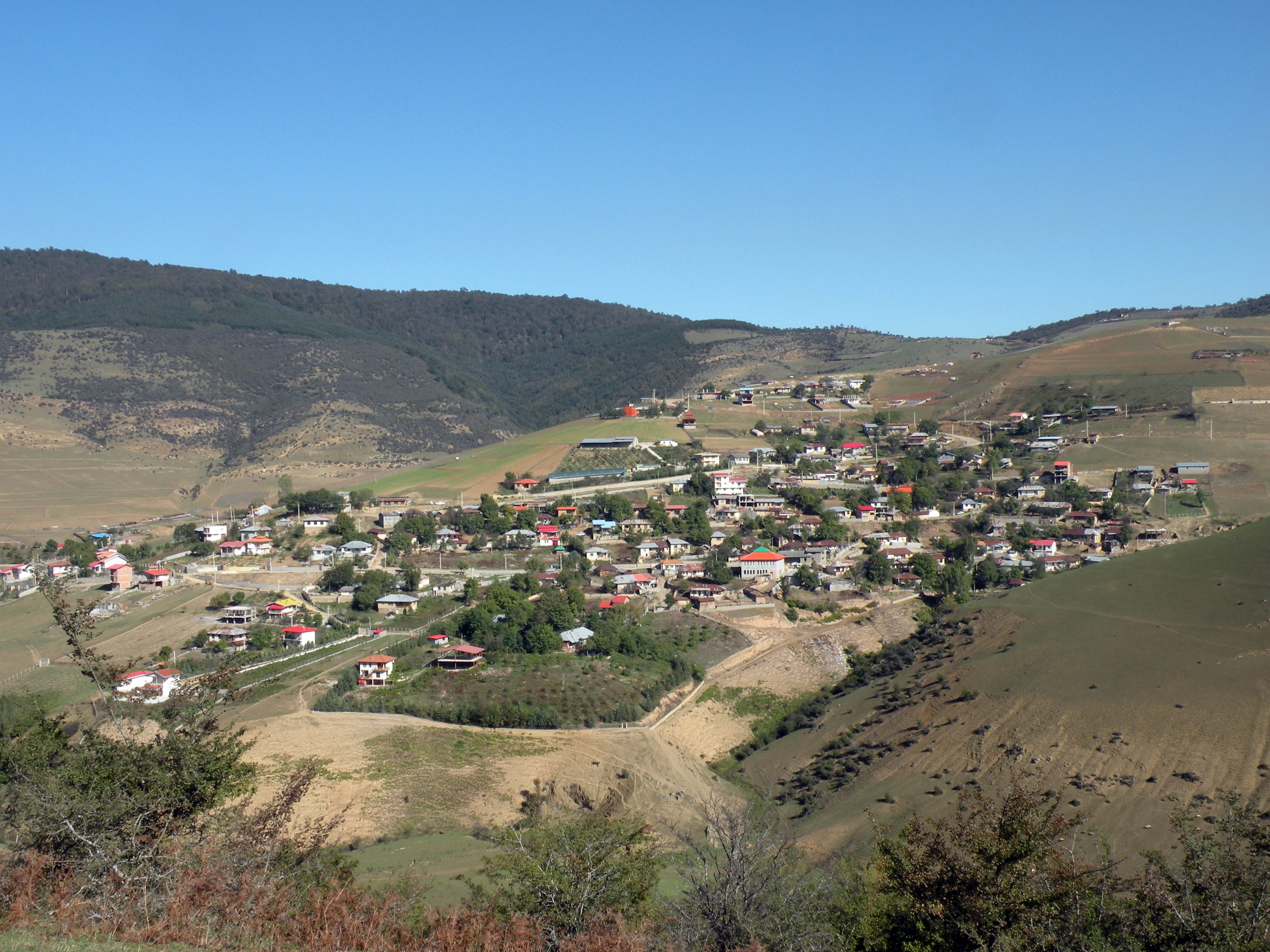
- The village of Sud Kola in 2018

- Location within Iran
- Coordinates: 36°05′43″N 53°11′26″E
- Country: Iran
- Province: Mazandaran
- County: Sari
- District: Dodangeh
- Rural District: Banaft

Population (2016)
  - Total: 157
- Time zone: UTC+3:30 (IRST)

Sud Kola (Persian: سودكلا) (Note: Also romanized as Sūd Kolā) is a village in Banaft Rural District of Dodangeh District in Sari County, Mazandaran province, Iran.

== Demographics ==
=== Population ===
At the time of the 2006 National Census, the village's population was 132 in 41 households. The following census in 2011 counted 259 people in 77 households. The 2016 census measured the population of the village as 157 people in 57 households.

== See also ==
Media related to Sud Kola at Wikimedia Commons
