= Margav-e Olya =

Margav-e Olya مرگاوعليا
- Village
- Location within Iran
- Coordinates: 36°11′11″N 53°11′51″E
- Country: Iran
- Province: Mazandaran
- County: Sari
- Bakhsh: Dodangeh
- Rural District: Farim

Population (2016)
  - Total: 84
- Time zone: UTC+3:30 (IRST)

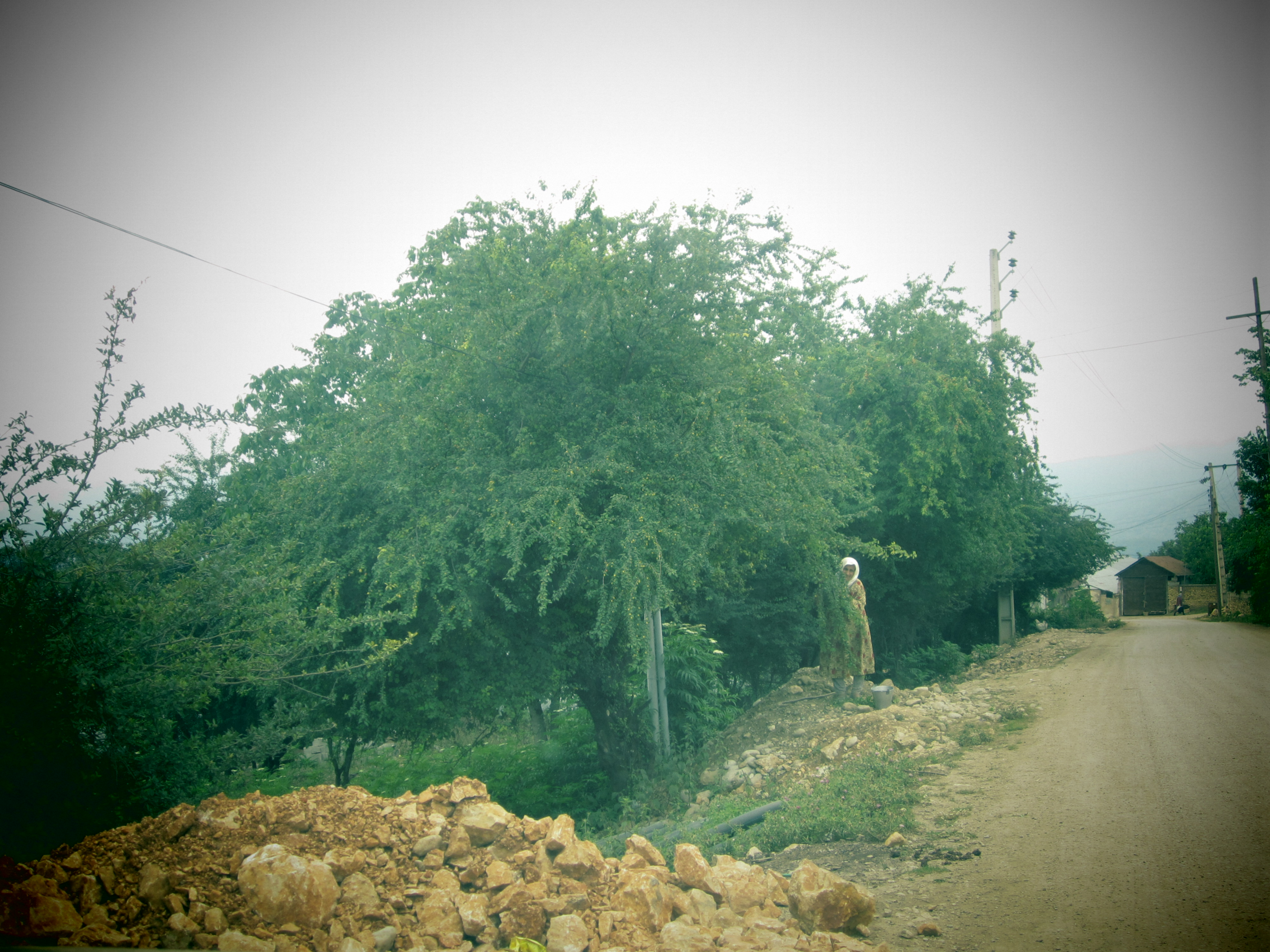

Margav-e Olya (Persian: مرگاوعليا, also Romanized as Margāv-e ‘Olyā; also known as Margāb-e ‘Olyā and Margāb ‘Olyā) is a village in Farim Rural District, Dodangeh District, Sari County, Mazandaran Province, Iran. At the 2006 census, its population was 150, in 50 families. Decreased to 84 people and 41 households in 2016.
