= Banaft Rural District =

Rural district in Mazandaran province, Iran

Banaft Rural District Persian: دهستان بنافت
- Rural District
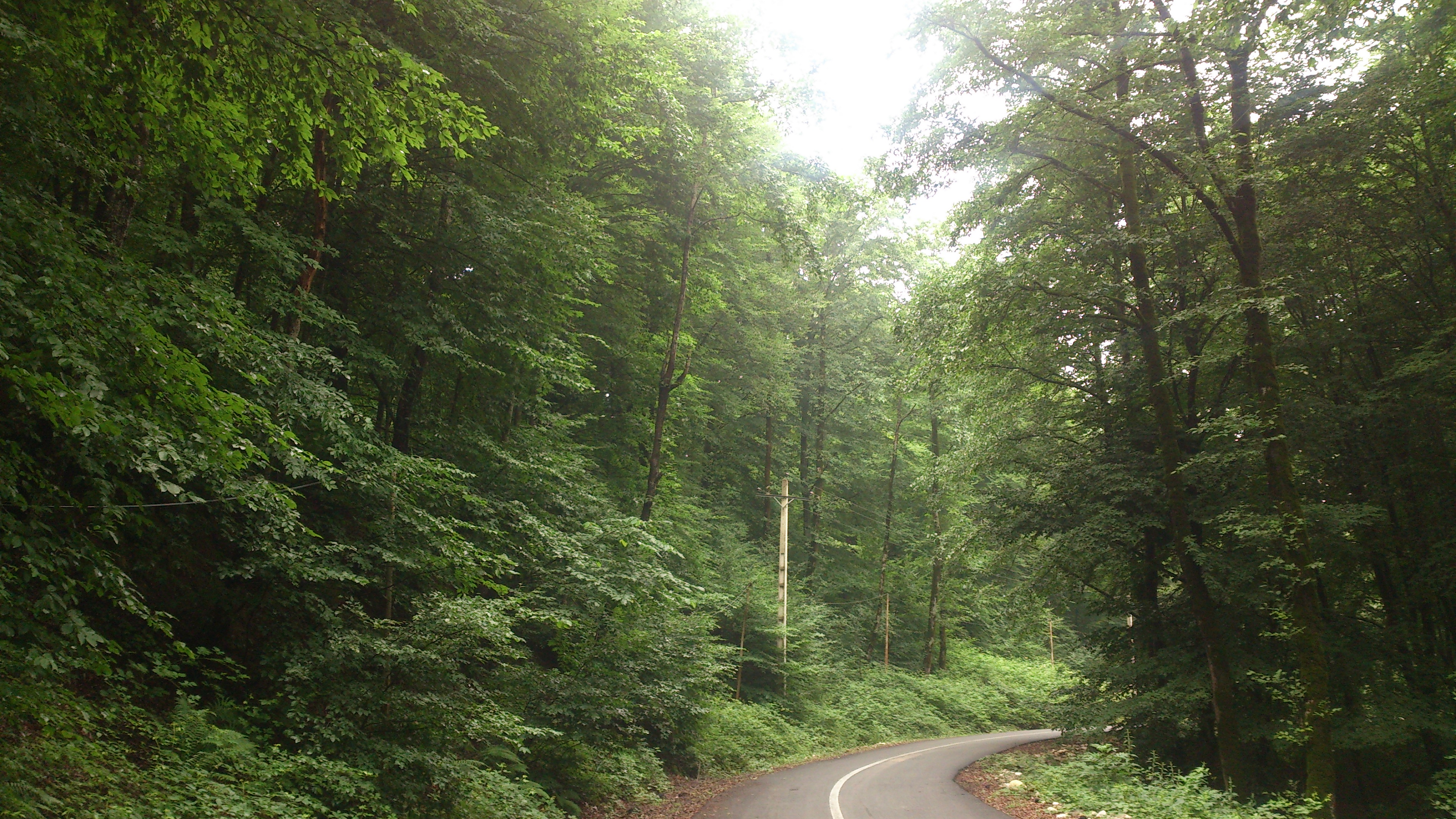
- Forests near the village of Sang Deh

- Location within Iran
- Coordinates: 36°02′N 53°15′E
- Country: Iran
- Province: Mazandaran
- County: Sari
- District: Dodangeh
- Established: 1987
- Capital: Sang Deh

Population (2016)
  - Total: 2,759
- Time zone: UTC+3:30 (IRST)

Banaft Rural District (Persian: دهستان بنافت) is in Dodangeh District of Sari County, Mazandaran province, Iran. Its capital is the village of Sang Deh.

== Demographics ==
=== Population ===
At the time of the 2006 National Census, the rural district's population was 3,209 in 901 households. There were 2,979 inhabitants in 963 households at the following census of 2011. The 2016 census measured the population of the rural district as 2,759 in 1,000 households. The most populous of its 11 villages was Sang Deh, with 1,227 people.

=== Other villages in the rural district ===
- Dadu Kola
- Darzi Kola
- Jijad
- Jur Jadeh
- Miana
- Pachi
- Sud Kola
- Valik Bon
- Valik Chal
- Vazmela
