= Farim Rural District =

Rural district in Mazandaran province, Iran

Farim Rural District Persian: دهستان فريم
- Rural District
- Location within Iran
- Coordinates: 36°10′N 53°15′E
- Country: Iran
- Province: Mazandaran
- County: Sari
- District: Dodangeh
- Established: 1987
- Capital: Farim

Population (2016)
  - Total: 4,525
- Time zone: UTC+3:30 (IRST)

Farim Rural District (Persian: دهستان فريم) is in Dodangeh District of Sari County, Mazandaran province, Iran. It is administered from the city of Farim. (Note: Formerly the village of Mohammadabad)

== Demographics ==
=== Population ===
At the time of the 2006 National Census, the rural district's population was 4,751 in 1,410 households. There were 4,454 inhabitants in 1,501 households at the following census of 2011. The 2016 census measured the population of the rural district as 4,525 in 1,743 households. The most populous of its 47 villages was Maji, with 279 people.

=== Other villages in the rural district ===
- Aliabad
- Angeh Fam
- Barar Deh
- Bisheh Kola
- Damad Kola
- Damir Kola
- Dineh Sar
- Emamzadeh Ali
- Emamzadeh Ali
- Estakhr Sar
- Jafar Kola
- Jafarabad
- Katrim
- Kelich Kola
- Kendelek
- Khorramabad-e Dineh Sar
- Khvosh Neshan
- Khvosh Rudbar
- Kohneh Deh
- Kolamak
- Kor Cha
- Korasb
- Margav-e Olya
- Margav-e Sofla
- Maskupa
- Mateh Kola
- Mula
- Pahnedar
- Par Kuh
- Part-e Kola
- Pasha Kola
- Qaran Sara
- Resket-e Olya
- Resket-e Sofla
- Sar Kam
- Shel Darreh
- Shelimak
- Siah Dasht-e Olya
- Siah Dasht-e Sofla
- Talaram
- Talavak
- Varmezabad
- Vav Darreh
