= Farim, Iran =

City in Mazandaran province, Iran

Farim Persian: فريم
- City
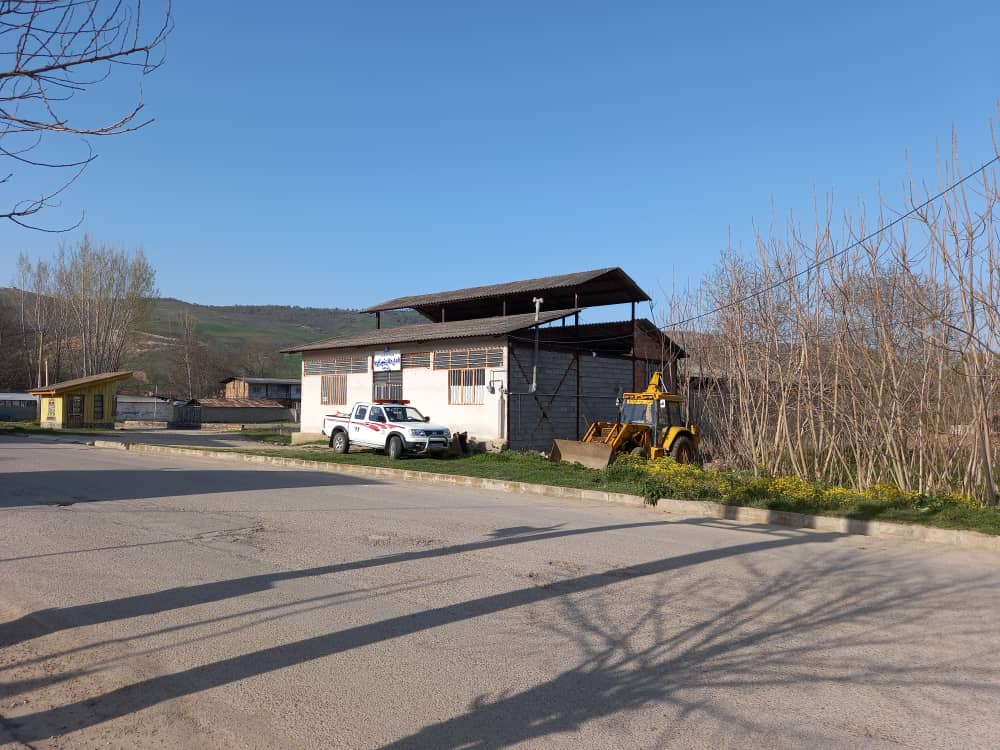
- Gas office in the city of Farim

- Location within Iran
- Coordinates: 36°10′33″N 53°15′56″E
- Country: Iran
- Province: Mazandaran
- County: Sari
- District: Dodangeh

Population (2016)
  - Total: 369
- Time zone: UTC+3:30 (IRST)

Farim (Persian: فريم) (Note: Also known as Faram and Ferem; formerly the village of Mohammadabad (محمد آباد)) is a city in, and the capital of, Dodangeh District in Sari County, Mazandaran province, Iran. It also serves as the administrative center for Farim Rural District.

== Demographics ==
=== Population ===
At the time of the 2006 National Census, the city's population was 180 in 50 households. The following census in 2011 counted 272 people in 81 households. The 2016 census measured the population of the city as 369 people in 127 households.
