= Emamzadeh Ali Akbar, Fars =

Emamzadeh Ali Akbar امام زاده علي اكبر
- Village
- Country: Iran
- Province: Fars
- County: Mamasani
- Bakhsh: Mahvarmilani
- Rural District: Mishan

Population (2006)
  - Total: 36
- Time zone: UTC+3:30 (IRST)
  - Summer (DST): UTC+4:30 (IRDT)

Emamzadeh Ali Akbar (Persian: امام زاده علي اكبر, also Romanized as Emāmzādeh 'Alī Akbar) is a village in Mishan Rural District, Mahvarmilani District, Mamasani County, Fars province, Iran. At the 2006 census, its population was 36, in 8 families.
