= Par Kuh, Hormozgan =

Par Kuh پركوه
- Village
- Location within Iran
- Coordinates: 25°52′26″N 58°29′10″E
- Country: Iran
- Province: Hormozgan
- County: Jask
- Bakhsh: Central
- Rural District: Gabrik

Population (2006)
  - Total: 362
- Time zone: UTC+3:30 (IRST)
  - Summer (DST): UTC+4:30 (IRDT)

Par Kuh (Persian: پركوه, also Romanized as Par Kūh) is a village in Gabrik Rural District, in the Central District of Jask County, Hormozgan Province, Iran. At the 2006 census, its population was 362, in 72 families.
