= Faram, Pakistan =

Faram (population c. 4,000) is a village in Punjab province, Pakistan, located some 22 km from Okara. Its residents follow a standard Punjabi way of life, and wear the shalwar kameez, dhoti, and turban, or pagri. Marriage ceremonies are simple and follow Punjabi sensibilities and culture. The local language is Punjabi.

Most people earn a living from agriculture, which is supported by the fertility of the land. Other sources of income are the raising of poultry and managing shops.

Faram hosts a festival every year from 13 to 20 March. People come from different villages for the event, which features a circus and stage productions.
