= Valik-e Sofla =

Valik-e Sofla وليك سفلي
- Village
- Location within Iran
- Coordinates: 36°33′59″N 52°25′13″E
- Country: Iran
- Province: Mazandaran
- County: Amol
- Bakhsh: Dabudasht
- Rural District: Dabuy-ye Jonubi

Population (2006)
  - Total: 320
- Time zone: UTC+3:30 (IRST)
  - Summer (DST): UTC+4:30 (IRDT)

Valik-e Sofla (Persian: وليك سفلي, also Romanized as Valīk-e Soflá; also known as Valīk-e Pā’īn) is a village in Dabuy-ye Jonubi Rural District, Dabudasht District, Amol County, Mazandaran Province, Iran. At the 2006 census, its population was 320, in 86 families.
