= Dodangeh District =

District in Mazandaran province, Iran

Dodangeh District Persian: بخش دودانگه
- District
- Location within Iran
- Coordinates: 36°07′N 53°15′E
- Country: Iran
- Province: Mazandaran
- County: Sari
- Capital: Farim

Population (2016)
  - Total: 7,653
- Time zone: UTC+3:30 (IRST)

Dodangeh District (Persian: بخش دودانگه) is in Sari County, Mazandaran province, Iran. Its capital is the city of Farim. (Note: Formerly the village of Mohammadabad)

== Demographics ==
=== Population ===
At the time of the 2006 National Census, the district's population was 8,140 in 2,361 households. The following census in 2011 counted 7,705 people in 2,545 households. The 2016 census measured the population of the district as 7,653 inhabitants in 2,870 households.

=== Administrative divisions ===
Dodangeh District Population
Administrative Divisions	2006	2011	2016
Banaft RD	3,209	2,979	2,759
Farim RD	4,751	4,454	4,525
Farim (city)	180	272	369
Total	8,140	7,705	7,653
RD = Rural District
