= List of tallest clock towers =

A list of the tallest structures with clocks on their exterior that can be seen from the ground. The list includes various structures with a working clock face or faces on their exteriors. The first type of structure are proper Clock towers which are structures that fulfil the definition of a tower with a clock face or faces on the exterior wall or walls. Possibly the most famous example is the colloquially termed Big Ben. Some structures of this type were originally built as bell towers and had the clocks added later, such as the Springfield Campanille. Some clock towers of this type are freestanding, such as the Joseph Chamberlain Memorial Clock Tower, while others are attached to, or on top of, buildings such as the tower on the Philadelphia City Hall. The second set of structures are buildings (rather than towers) that had clock faces on the exterior as part of their original design such as the Wrigley Building. The third set of structures are buildings that have had a clock face or faces added after the original building was constructed such as the Palace of Culture and Science. This division of structures with clock faces follows the general terminology used in related articles and follows Council on Tall Buildings and Urban Habitat (CTBUH) criteria. For the purposes of comparison and clarity this list includes all structures with clocks and clock faces of the types previously described. The list includes all clock 'tower' structures with a height of at least 40 m (130 ft).

Colo(u)r code
bold	Denotes structure is the tallest of its type (as described below) in the world
	Denotes freestanding clock tower fulfilling the strict definition
	Denotes clock tower fulfilling the strict definition, either attached to or on top of another structure
	Denotes structure that was designed as multi-functional structure; this included clock faces
	Denotes structure where the clock faces were not in the original design but were added after the completion of the structure

Table terminology
Building	A structure which is at least 50% 'occupiable' and fulfils the CTBUH definition
Tower	A structure which is less than 50% occupiable and fulfils the CTBUH definition
Freestanding Tower	A tower that is not attached to or located on top of another building – a standalone structure. A category used by CTBUH
Tower Building	A tower that is located on top of or attached to another building. A category used by CTBUH

== List ==
Rank	Name	Image	Height	Number of faces	Chiming	Year	Type of structure	Main function	Country	City	Remarks	Ref
1	Abraj Al Bait Towers		601 m (1,972 ft)	4	No	2012	Building	Hotel	Saudi Arabia	Mecca	Tallest building with clock faces. The clock faces are the faces highest above the ground on any structure	
2	NTT Docomo Yoyogi Building		240 m (790 ft)	1	No	2000 (building) 2002 (clocks added)	Building	Offices	Japan	Tokyo	Clock faces are 15 m (49 ft)	
3	Palace of Culture and Science		230.7 m (757 ft)	4	No	1955 (building); 2000 (clocks added)	Building	Offices (original) Multi-use (current)	Poland	Warsaw	Building constructed in 1955. Clock faces added in 2000. Clock faces are 6.3 m (21 ft)	
4	Metropolitan Life Insurance Company Tower		213.4 m (700 ft)	4	No	1909(building) 1912 (clock)	Building	Offices (original) Offices/Hotel (current)	(United States) USA	New York	Clock faces are 8 m (26 ft)	
5	Philadelphia City Hall		167 m (548 ft)	4	No	1901	Tower Building	Offices	(United States) USA	Philadelphia	Clock faces are 7.9 m (26 ft)	
6	Mercantile National Bank Building		159.4 m (523 ft)	4	No	1943	Building	Offices (original) Offices/Residential (current)	(United States) USA	Dallas	Building completed in 1942. Addition of clock tower 1943	
7	Custom House Tower		151 m (495 ft)	4	No	1916	Building	Offices (original); Hotel (current)	(United States) USA	Boston	Clock faces 6.7 m (22 ft); Due to the installation of an undersized motor, the clock failed to work properly through much of the 20th century	
8	Wrigley Building		133.5 m (438 ft)	1	No	1922	Building	Offices	(United States) USA	Chicago	The clock faces are 5.97 m (19.6 ft)	
9	St. Michael's Church tower		132 m (433 ft)	4	Yes	1911	Tower building	Religious	Germany	Hamburg	Largest clock faces in Germany at 8 m (26 ft)	
9	St. Peter's Church tower		132 m (433 ft)	4	Yes	1878	Tower building	Religious	Germany	Hamburg	Previous 127.5 m (418 ft) m tall tower from 1516 to 1842	
11	Cathedral of Our Lady (Antwerp)		123 m (404 ft)	4	Yes	1521 (clocks added in C18)	Tower Building	Religious	Belgium	Antwerp	Part of the Belfries of Belgium and France, a UNESCO World Heritage site.	
12	Central do Brasil		122 m (400 ft)	4	Yes	1943	Building	Railway Station	Brazil	Rio de Janeiro	Clock faces are 20 m (66 ft) tall	
13	Moscow State University		118 m (387 ft)	4	No	1953	Building	Education	Russia	Moscow	University has one central tower (no clock face) and four ancillary towers upon which one clock face and a barometer and thermometer are located. The height given is for the ancillary towers. The main building is 239 m (784 ft). Clock faces are 9 m (30 ft)	
14	Mortegliano bell tower		113.2 m (371 ft)	4	Yes	1959	Tower Building	Religious	Italy	Mortegliano	Tallest bell tower in Italy	
15	Torrazzo of Cremona		112.5 m (369 ft)	1	Yes	1309	Tower building	Religious	Italy	Cremona	Clock face is 8.2 m (27 ft)	
16	Hamburg City Hall		112 m (367 ft)	3	No	1897	Building	Government	Germany	Hamburg		
17	Milwaukee City Hall		107.6 m (353 ft)	4	Yes	1895	Building	Government	(United States) USA	Milwaukee	Clock faces are 5.5 m (18 ft).	
18	Copenhagen City Hall		105.6 m (346 ft)	4	No	1905	Tower Building	Government	Denmark	Copenhagen	Houses Jens Olsen's World Clock	
19	Minneapolis City Hall		105 m (344 ft)	4	Yes	1906	Tower-Building	Clock Tower/Government	(United States) USA	Minneapolis	Largest four face chiming clock in the world. Clock faces are 7.2 m (24 ft).	
20	Lille City Hall Belfry		104 m (341 ft)	4	Yes	1932	Tower Building	Government	France	Lille	Part of the Belfries of Belgium and France, a UNESCO World Heritage site.	
21	Old City Hall		103.6 m (340 ft)	1	No	1899	Tower Building	Clock Tower/Government	Canada	Toronto	Clock face is 6 m (20 ft)	
22	Joseph Chamberlain Memorial Clock Tower		100 m (330 ft)	4	Yes	1908	Freestanding Tower	Clock & bell tower	United Kingdom	Birmingham	Tallest freestanding clock tower in the world. Clock faces are 5.25 m (17.2 ft).	
23	Munich Frauenkirche		98.5 m (323 ft)	3 (each tower)	Yes	1488	Tower Building (Twin Towers)	Religious	Germany	Munich	Domes added in 1524	
24	Royal Liver Building		98.2 m (322 ft)	4	Yes	1911	Building	Offices	United Kingdom	Liverpool	Clocks faces on two towers 7.6 m (25 ft) diameter. Building part of the World Heritage Maritime Mercantile City	
25	Elizabeth Tower		96 m (315 ft)	4	Yes	1859	Tower Building	Clock Tower/Government	United Kingdom	London	Clock faces are 7 m (23 ft). Commonly known as 'Big Ben', although this is the name of the largest chiming bell. Part of the Palace of Westminster UNESCO World Heritage site.	
26	Lecco bell tower		96 m (315 ft)	4	Yes	1904	Tower Building	Religious	Italy	Lecco		
27	The Tower of Palazzo Vecchio		95 m (312 ft)	1	No	14th C	Tower Building	Government	Italy	Florence		
28	University of Texas Tower		93.6 m (307 ft)	4	Yes	1937	Building	Education	(United States) USA	Austin, Texas		
29	Sather Tower		93.5 m (307 ft)	4	Yes	1914	Freestanding Tower	Bell Tower (original); Clock & Bell Tower (current)	(United States) USA	Berkeley	Clock was added in 1926. With the addition of the clock now the second tallest freestanding clock tower in the world	
30	Lendinara bell tower		92.5 m (303 ft)	1	Yes	1857	Tower building	Religious	Italy	Lendinara		
31	Peace Tower		92.2 m (302 ft)	4	Yes	1920	Tower Building	Clock Tower/Government	Canada	Ottawa	Clock faces are 4.8 m (16 ft). Built to commemorate Canadians who lost their lives in World War I	
32	Brisbane City Hall		92 m (302 ft)	4	Yes	1930	Tower Building	Government	Australia	Brisbane	Clock faces are 4.9 m (16 ft)	
32	Torre del Popolo		92 m (302 ft)	1	Yes	1838	Tower building	Clock tower	Italy	Palazzolo sull'Oglio		
34	Springfield Campanille		91.44 m (300.0 ft)	4	Yes	1913	Freestanding Tower	Bell Tower (original) Clock & Bell Tower (current)	(United States) USA	Springfield, Massachusetts	Currently not open to the public. With the addition of the clock now the third tallest freestanding clock tower in the world	
35	Belfry of Ghent		91 m (299 ft)	4	Yes	1543	Tower Building	Clock Tower/Belfry	Belgium	Ghent	Part of the Belfries of Belgium and France, a UNESCO World Heritage site.	
36	St. Lambert's Church, Münster		90.5 m (297 ft)	1	Yes	1890	Tower Building	Religious	Germany	Münster	older clock tower with cupola from 1500	
37	Breganze bell tower		90 m (300 ft)	1	Yes	1893	Tower building	Religious	Italy	Breganze		
38	Misr Spinning and Weaving Company Clock Tower		90 m (300 ft)	4	Yes	1947	Freestanding Tower	Clock & bell tower	Egypt	El Mahalla El Kubra	4th tallest freestanding clock tower. Clock faces are 5.2 m (17 ft)	
39	Emerson Tower		88.1 m (289 ft)	4	No	1911	Building	Offices	(United States) USA	Baltimore	Clock faces are 7.3 m (24 ft). The largest four dial gravity clock in the world	
40	Torre del Mangia		87 m (285 ft)	1	Yes	1349	Tower building	Government	Italy	Siena		
41	Belfry of Mons		87 m (285 ft)	4	Yes	1672	Freestanding Tower	Clock & Belfry Tower	Belgium	Mons	5th tallest freestanding clock tower. Part of the Belfries of Belgium and France, a UNESCO World Heritage site.	
42	Central Railway Station		85.6 m (281 ft)	4	No	1921	Tower Building	Railway Station	Australia	Sydney	Clock faces are 4.77 m (15.6 ft)	
43	Rajabai Clock Tower		85.3 m (280 ft)	4	Yes	1878	Freestanding Tower	Clock tower	India	Mumbai	6th tallest freestanding clock tower in the world. A UNESCO World Heritage site	
44	Allen-Bradley Clock Tower		85.3 m (280 ft)	4	Yes	1963	Tower Building	Clock Tower	(United States) USA	Milwaukee	Clock faces are 12.25 m (40.2 ft)	
45	Manchester Town Hall		85.3 m (280 ft)	4	Yes	1877	Tower Building	Government	United Kingdom	Manchester	Tallest town hall clock tower in UK. The clock faces are 4.8 m (15.7 ft)	
46	Belfry of Bruges		83 m (272 ft)	1	Yes	1822	Tower Building	Government	Belgium	Bruges	Part of the Belfries of Belgium and France, a UNESCO World Heritage site.	
46	Castellanza bell tower		83 m (272 ft)	4	Yes	1932	Tower building	Religious	Italy	Castellanza		
48	Vancouver Block		80.7 m (265 ft)	4	No	1912	Building	Commercial	Canada	Vancouver	Clock faces 6.7 m (22 ft). Faces are illuminated at night	
49	Helsinki Cathedral		80 m (260 ft)	1	Yes	1852	Building	Religious	Finland	Helsinki	Clock added after building completion	
50	New Town Hall (Munich)		79.25 m (260.0 ft)	4	Yes	1908	Tower Building	Government	Germany	Munich	Houses the Rathaus Glockenspiel which includes 43 bells and 32 animatronic figures	
51	St Pancras railway station		76 m (249 ft)	4	Yes	1868	Tower Building	Railway Station	United Kingdom	London		
52	Calais Town Hall		75 m (246 ft)	4	Yes	1925	Tower Building	Government	France	Calais	Part of the Belfries of Belgium and France, a UNESCO World Heritage site.	
53	Arras Town Hall		75 m (246 ft)	4	Yes	1554	Tower Building	Government	France	Arras	Part of the Belfries of Belgium and France, a UNESCO World Heritage site.. Destroyed in WW1 and rebuilt 1924–1932	
54	Siemensstadt		75 m (246 ft)	4	No	1909	Tower Building	Commercial	Germany	Berlin	Clock faces are 7 m (23 ft)	
55	San Francisco Ferry Building		74.7 m (245 ft)	4	Yes	1898	Building	Ferry Terminal	(United States) USA	San Francisco	Clock faces are 6.7 m (22 ft) Clock tower houses a private penthouse residence	
55	Waterbury Union Station		74.7 m (245 ft)	4	No	1909	Tower Building	Railway Station	(United States) USA	Waterbury		
57	Central Library of Catholic University of Leuven		73.5 m (241 ft)	4	Yes	1928	Tower Building	Education	Belgium	Leuven	Part of the Belfries of Belgium and France, a UNESCO World Heritage site. Rebuilt after WW2	
58	Salt Lake City and County Building		73 m (240 ft)	4	Yes	1894	Tower Building	Government	(United States) USA	Salt Lake City		
59	Spasskaya Tower		71 m (233 ft)	4	Yes	1851	Tower Building	Clock Tower	Russia	Moscow	The clock faces are 6.12 m (20.1 ft)	
60	Ypres Cloth Hall		70 m (230 ft)	4	Yes	1304 Rebuilt 1933–1967	Tower Building	Commercial (original)	Belgium	Ypres	Belfry originally a watchtower. Clocks added later. Part of the Belfries of Belgium and France, a UNESCO World Heritage site.	
61	Charleroi City Hall Belfry		70 m (230 ft)	4	Yes	1936	Tower Building	Government	Belgium	Charleroi	Part of the Belfries of Belgium and France, a UNESCO World Heritage site.	
62	Leeds Town Hall		69 m (226 ft)	4	Yes	1858	Tower Building	Government	United Kingdom	Leeds		
63	Husainabad Clock Tower		67 m (220 ft)	4	No	1881	Free standing tower	Clock tower	India	Lucknow	7th tallest freestanding clock tower. The clock faces are 3.95 m (13.0 ft)	
64	Gare de Lyon		67 m (220 ft)	4	No	1902	Tower building	Railway Station	France	Paris		
65	Limoges-Bénédictins railway station		67 m (220 ft)	4	No	1929	Tower Building	Railway Station	France	Limoges	Clock face is 4 m (13 ft)	
66	Oslo City Hall		63 m (207 ft)	1	Yes	1950	Building	Government	Norway	Oslo	Tower with clock on it is known as Oslo Rådhus 2. Clock face is 8.6 m (28 ft). Building hosts the Nobel Peace Prize each year	
67	Palace of the Province		62.5 m (205 ft)	4	No	1935	Tower Building	Government	Italy	Bari		
68	Messina astronomical clock		61 m (200 ft)	4	Yes	1933 (clock) 1929 (tower)	Tower Building	Clock Tower	Italy	Messina	The clock faces are 2.4 m (7.9 ft)	
69	Bolton Town Hall		60.35 m (198.0 ft)	4	Yes	1873	Tower Building	Government	United Kingdom	Bolton	The clock faces are 3.65 m (12.0 ft)	
70	Belfry of Thuin		60 m (200 ft)	4	Yes	1641	Freestanding Tower	Belfry	Belgium	Thuin	8th tallest freestanding clock tower. Part of the Belfries of Belgium and France, a UNESCO World Heritage site.	
71	Shell Mex House		58 m (190 ft)	1	No	1930	Building	Offices	United Kingdom	London	Largest clock face in UK at 7.62 m (25.0 ft)	
72	Parkinson Building		57 m (187 ft)	4	Yes	1951	Tower Building	Education	United Kingdom	Leeds		
73	Indianapolis Union Station		56.4 m (185 ft)	4	No	1888	Tower Building	Railway Station	(United States) USA	Indianapolis		
74	Old Arts Building Clock Tower		54 m (177 ft)	1	No	1926	Tower Building	Education	New Zealand	Auckland		
75	McGraw Tower		52.7 m (173 ft)	4	Yes	1891	Building	Education	(United States) USA	Ithaca	Originally constructed as a library. Now houses a museum and the Cornell Chimes	
76	University of Santo Tomas Main Building		51.5 m (169 ft)	4	No	1927	Tower Building	Education	Philippines	Manila		
77	UC Riverside Bell Tower		49.1 m (161 ft)	4	Yes	1966	Freestanding Tower	Education	(United States) USA	Riverside	1 of 40 Grand Carillons in the United States. 9th tallest freestanding clock tower	
78	Purdue Bell Tower		48.8 m (160 ft)	4	Yes	1995	Freestanding Tower	Education	(United States) USA	West Lafayette, Indiana	10th tallest freestanding clock tower	
79	Helsinki Central Station		48.5 m (159 ft)	4	No	1914	Tower Building	Railway Station	Finland	Helsinki		
80	Montreal Clock Tower		45 m (148 ft)	4	No	1922	Freestanding Tower	Clock Tower	Canada	Montreal	11th tallest freestanding clock tower. Clock faces are 3.6 m (12 ft)	
81	Portland Union Station		45 m (148 ft)	4	No	1896	Tower Building	Railway Station	(United States) USA	Portland		
82	Aalst Belfry		47 m (154 ft)	4	Yes	1460	Tower Building	Government	Belgium	Aalst	Part of the Belfries of Belgium and France, a UNESCO World Heritage site.	
83	Clock Tower, Hong Kong		44 m (144 ft)	4	Yes	1915	Freestanding Tower	Railway Station (former)	China	Hong Kong	12th tallest freestanding clock tower. Clock tower formerly part of railway terminus now a freestanding tower	
84	Albert Memorial Clock Tower		43 m (141 ft)	4	Yes	1869	Freestanding Tower	Clock Tower	United Kingdom	Belfast	Height disputed in sources between 43 m (141 ft) and 34.5 m (113 ft) If the greater height 13th tallest freestanding clock tower	
85	Chennai Central railway station		41.5 m (136 ft)	1	No	18??	Tower Building	Railway station	India	Chennai		
86	Sultan Abdul Samad Building		41 m (135 ft)	1	No	1897	Tower Building	Offices	Malaysia	Kuala Lumpur		
87	Guildhall, Kingston upon Hull		41 m (135 ft)	1	Yes	1914	Tower Building	Government	United Kingdom	Hull		
88	City Hall and Belfry		40.3 m (132 ft)	4	Yes	1377	Tower Building	Government	Belgium	Dendermonde	Part of the Belfries of Belgium and France, a UNESCO World Heritage site.	
89	Belfry of Saint Éloi		40 m (130 ft)	4	Yes	C15	Freestanding Tower	Belfry	France	Dunkirk	Originally the western tower of the Church Saint Éloi separated by a street in 18th century. 14th tallest freestanding clock tower. Part of the Belfries of Belgium and France, a UNESCO World Heritage site.	
90	Ripon Building		40 m (130 ft)	1	No	1913	Tower Building	Government	India	Chennai		
91	Mint Tower		40 m (130 ft)	4	Yes	1487	Freestanding Tower	Clock & Bell Tower	Netherlands	Amsterdam	15th tallest freestanding clock tower. Formerly part of the medieval city walls	
92	Metz-Ville station		40 m (130 ft)	4	No	1908	Tower Building	Railway station	France	Metz		
93	Stephen's Tower		40 m (130 ft)	4	No	1899	Tower	Clock Tower	Romania	Baia Mare		

== See also ==
- List of largest clock faces
- List of clock towers
- List of tallest towers
- List of tallest buildings
