= List of largest clock faces =

List of clocks with the largest faces

A list of permanent working clocks with the largest faces in the world. Entries include all clocks with faces at least 4 m (13 ft) in diameter. Clocks can be located on the exterior or interior of buildings, and towers as well as on the ground as is the case with floral clock faces.

Rank	Location	Image	Diameter	No. of faces	Chiming	Year	Structure	Country	City	Remarks	Ref
1	Mecca Royal Clock Tower		43 m (141 ft)	4	No	2012	Building	Saudi Arabia	Mecca	Tallest building with clock faces. Building 601 metres (1,972 feet) which also makes the clock faces the highest above the ground level	
2	Istanbul Cevahir		36 m (118 ft)	1	No	2005	Shopping centre	Turkey	Istanbul	3-metre-high digits laid on the transparent roof of the centre	
3	Bhestan	Photo	24.2 m (79 ft)	1	No	?	Floral clock	India	Surat	Largest floral clock in the world	
4	Aekyung Tower	Photo	24 m (79 ft)	1	No	2018	Building	South Korea	Seoul		
5	Park Heroyiv		22 m (72 ft)	1	No	2011	Floral clock	Ukraine	Kryvyi Rih	Constructed to celebrate the 20th anniversary of Ukraine's independence. Minute hand is 13 m (43 ft).	
6	Central do Brasil		20 m (66 ft)	4	No	1943	Railway station	Brazil	Rio de Janeiro	Largest clock face in South America. Clock tower is 122 m (400 ft) tall	
7	Baitul Khairaat Grand Mosque	Photo	19 m (62 ft)	1	No	2025	Mosque	Indonesia	Palu	Largest clock in Indonesia, as certified by the Indonesian World Records Museum.	
8	Duquesne Brewery		18 m (59 ft)	1	No	1933	Building	USA	Pittsburgh	Largest clock face in North America. Octagonal clock. Has 8.5 m (28 ft) and 6.4 m (21 ft) aluminium hands	
9	Gohar Park	Iran's biggest clock	17 m (56 ft)	1	No	2021	Mountain	Iran	Sirjan	Iran's biggest clock, Located in Gohar Park of Sirjan.	
10	Colgate Clock (New Jersey)		15.2 m (50 ft)	1	No	1924	Freestanding	USA	Jersey City	Octagonal clock. Originally located on roof of Colgate headquarters building	
11	Tehran's Floral Clock	ساعت گل تهران	15.1 m (50 ft)	1	No	2005	Floral clock	Iran	Tehran	It was the biggest clock in Middle East before the tower clock of Mecca	
12	NTT Docomo Yoyogi Building		15 m (49 ft)	4	No	2000(building); 2002(clocks added)	Building	Japan	Tokyo	Tower is 240 m (790 ft)	
13	Grozny City Towers		13.6 m (45 ft)	2	No	2011	Building	Russia	Grozny	Minute hand is 7.3 m (24 ft) and hour hand is 5.5 m (18 ft).	
14	Kronos Office Building		12.9 m (42.3 ft)	1	No	2021	Office Building	Thailand	Bangkok	Largest clock in Thailand. Located at the top of Kronos Office Building, a 29-storey luxury office building in Bangkok City.	
15	Rockwell Automation HQ		12.25 m (40.2 ft)	4	No	1962	Clock tower	USA	Milwaukee	Clock tower is 86.25 m (283.0 ft) and is known as the Allen-Bradley clock tower. Each hour hand is 4.8 m (16 ft) long. Each minute hand is 6.1 m (20 ft) long.	
16	Niagara Falls Floral Clock		12.2 m (40 ft)	1	No	1950	Floral Clock	Canada	Niagara Falls		
17	Colgate Clock (Indiana)		12 m (39 ft)	1	No	1906	Freestanding	USA	Clarksville	Octagonal clock face. Built for the centennial of the Colgate Company in its original location of Jersey City. Moved to Indiana in 1924 when a larger replacement was made.	
18	Alexandra Clock	Photo	11 m (36 ft)	1	No	1968	Freestanding	New Zealand	Alexandra	Located on a hill overlooking the town.	
19	Kentucky State Capitol		10 m (33 ft)	1	No	1961	Floral clock	USA	Frankfort	Located in the grounds of the capitol building. Minute hand 6.1 m (20 ft) and hour hand 4.6 m (15 ft).	
20	Gare de Cergy - Saint-Christophe		10 m (33 ft)	1	No	1988	Railway station	France	Cergy		
21	Resovia Office		10 m (33 ft)	1	No	2020	Office building	Poland	Rzeszów	Fifth largest clock face in Europe	
22	Aarau railway station		9 m (30 ft)	1	No	1988	Railway station	Switzerland	Aarau	Sixth largest clock face in Europe	
23	Main building of Moscow State University		9 m (30 ft)	4	No	1953	Building	Russia	Moscow	University has one central tower (no clock face) and four ancillary towers upon which one clock face and a barometer and thermometer are located. Minute hand is 3.9 m (13 ft)	
24	Stephen's Green Shopping Centre		8.9 m (29 ft)	1	No	1988	Shopping centre	Republic of Ireland	Dublin		
25	St Peter's Church		8.64 m (28.3 ft)	1	No	1534	Church	Switzerland	Zürich	Largest church clock face. The minute hand is 5.73 metres (18.8 ft) and the hour hand is 5.07 metres (16.6 ft)	
26	Oslo City Hall		8.6 m (28 ft)	1	Yes	1950	Building	Norway	Oslo	Tower with clock on it is known as Oslo Rådhus 2 and is 63 m (207 ft). Building hosts the Nobel Peace Prize each year	
27	Christchurch Floral Clock		8.5 m (28 ft)	1	No	1953	Floral clock	New Zealand	Christchurch	Over 7000 plants are required each spring and autumn for the design	
28	Torrazzo of Cremona		8.2 m (27 ft)	1	No	1588	Tower Building	Italy	Cremona	Largest clock face in Italy and one of the largest astronomical clock faces in the world.	
29	St. Michael's Church, Hamburg		8 m (26 ft)	4	No	1911	Church	Germany	Hamburg	The minute hand is 4.91 m (16.1 ft) and the hour hand is 3.65 m (12.0 ft) 3.65 m. The Clock tower is 132 m (433 ft)	
30	Met Life Tower		8 m (26 ft)	4	No	1912	Building	USA	New York	Minute hands are 5.2 m (17 ft) and the hour hands are 4.06 m (13.3 ft). Tower 213.4 m (700 ft) tall	
31	Philadelphia City Hall		7.9 m (26 ft)	4	No	1901	Clock tower	USA	Philadelphia	Building with clock tower is 167 m (548 ft)	
32	Shell Mex House		7.62 m (25.0 ft)	2	No	1930	Building	United Kingdom	London	Largest clock faces in UK	
33	Waverly at South Beach		7.62 m (25 ft)	1	No	2000	Building	USA	Miami	Clock Movement weighs 771 kg (1700 lbs)	
34	Royal Liver Building		7.6 m (25 ft)	4	Electronic	1911	Clock tower	United Kingdom	Liverpool	Clocks on two towers with building including clock towers 98.2 m (322 ft). Building part of the World Heritage Maritime Mercantile City	
35	Church of the Most Sacred Heart of Our Lord		7.6 m (25 ft)	1	No	1932	Church	Czech Republic	Prague		
36	Detsky Mir		7.5 m (25 ft)	1	No	2014	Shopping centre	Russia	Moscow	Clock is inside toy shop. Pendulum is 13 m (43 ft)	
37	Emerson Tower		7.3 m (24 ft)	4	No	1911	Building	USA	Baltimore	The largest four-dial gravity clock in the world. Tower is 88.1 m (289 ft)	
38	Minneapolis City Hall		7.2 m (24 ft)	4	Yes	1906	Clock tower	USA	Minneapolis	Largest four-face chiming clock in the world. Clock tower is 105 m (344 ft). Minute hands are 4.3 m (14 ft)	
39	Elizabeth Tower		7 m (23 ft)	4	Yes	1859	Clock Tower	United Kingdom	London	Clock tower is 96 m (315 ft) tall. Commonly known as 'Big Ben', although this is accurately the name of the largest chiming bell.	
40	Siemensstadt		7 m (23 ft)	4	No	1909	Tower building	Germany	Berlin	Tower is 75 m (246 ft)	
41	Cathedral of Our Lady (Antwerp)		6.9 m (23 ft)	4	Yes	1786	Church	Belgium	Antwerp	Tower is 123 m (404 ft)	
42	Ayer Mill		6.75 m (22.1 ft)	4	Yes	1909	Clock tower	USA	Lawrence		
43	San Francisco Ferry Building		6.7 m (22 ft)	4	Yes	1898	Building	USA	San Francisco	Clock tower is 74.7 m (245 ft) and houses a private penthouse residence	
44	Vancouver Block		6.7 m (22 ft)	4	No	1912	Building	Canada	Vancouver	Building is 80.7 m (265 ft). Faces are illuminated at night	
45	Custom House Tower		6.7 m (22 ft)	1	No	1916	Building	USA	Boston	Due to the installation of an undersized motor, the clock failed to work properly through much of the 20th century	
46	Clock Tower of Bologna		6.4 m (21 ft)	1	Yes	1451	Building	Italy	Bologna		
47	Palace of Culture and Science		6.2 m (20 ft)	4	No	2000	Building	Poland	Warsaw	Building constructed in 1955 at a height of 237 m (778 ft). Clock faces added later.	
48	Spasskaya Tower		6.12 m (20.1 ft)	4	Yes	1851	Building	Russia	Moscow	The tower is 71 m (232.9 ft) tall	
49	Mercantile National Bank Building		6.1 m (20 ft)	4	No	1943	Building	USA	Dallas	Building completed in 1942. Addition of clock tower 1943. Height of building 159.4 m (523 ft)	
50	Old City Hall		6 m (20 ft)	1	Yes	1899	Tower building	Canada	Toronto	Clock tower is 103.6 m (340 ft)	
51	Multi-level parking of Mashhad		6 m (20 ft)	3	No	2022	Multi-level parking	Iran	Mashhad	Building is 52 m. Largest tower clock in Iran.	
52	Wrigley Building		5.97 m (19.6 ft)	1	No	1924	Building	USA	Chicago	The hour hands are 1.73 m (5 ft 8 in) and the minute hands 2.79 m (9 ft 2 in). The building is 133.5 m (438 ft)	
53	Clock tower of Padua		5.6 m (18 ft)	1	No	1437	Building	Italy	Padua		
54	Milwaukee City Hall		5.5 m (18 ft)	1	Yes	1895	Tower building	USA	Milwaukee	Tower is 107.6 m (353 ft) tall	
55	Joseph Chamberlain Memorial Clock Tower		5.25 m (17.2 ft)	4	Yes	1908	Clock tower	United Kingdom	Birmingham	Tallest freestanding clock tower in the world at 100 m (330 ft). The hour hand is 3 m (9.8 ft) and the minute hand is 1.8 m (5 ft 11 in)	
56	Jardin Anglais		5 m (16 ft)	1	No	2002	Floral clock	Switzerland	Geneva	Originally created in 1955	
57	Brisbane City Hall		4.8 m (16 ft)	4	Yes	1930	Tower building	Australia	Brisbane	Tower is 91 m (299 ft)	
58	Manchester Town Hall		4.8 m (16 ft)	4	Yes	1877	Tower building	United Kingdom	Manchester	Tallest town hall clock tower in UK.	
59	Peace Tower		4.8 m (16 ft)	4	Yes	1920	Tower building	Canada	Ottawa	Tower is 92.2 m (302 ft) tall. Built to commemorate Canadians who lost their lives in World War I	
60	Central Railway Station		4.77 m (15.6 ft)	4	No	1921	Tower building	Australia	Sydney	Tower is 85.6 m (281 ft)	
61	Royal Palace	Photo	4.7 m (15 ft)	1	No	?	Floral clock	Malaysia	Anak Bukit		

== Temporarily installed clocks ==
A list of clocks with the largest faces that have been installed as temporary structures. Inclusion in this list follows the criteria for the list above except for the temporary nature of the clock.

Rank	Location	Image	Diameter	No. of faces	Chiming	Year	Structure	Country	City	Remarks	Ref
1	Burning Man Festival	Video	3.28 km (2.04 mi)	1	No	2011	Laser	USA	Black Rock Desert	It took 13 months to create the clock	
2	Scania Clock	Photo	298.5 m (979 ft)	1	No	2016	Articulated lorries	Spain	Unknown	Created with 14 Scania trucks driving in circles for 24 hours at an abandoned airfield	
3	World Fair	Photos	30 m (98 ft)	1	No	1904	Floral clock	USA	St Louis	Created for the world fair	

== Demolished clocks ==
A list of the largest faced clocks that have been destroyed or demolished since their construction. Inclusion in this list follows the criteria for the list above except for the fact that the clocks are no longer extant.

Rank	Location	Image	Diameter	No. of faces	Chiming	Year	Structure	Country	City	Remarks	Ref
1	St. Rumbold's Cathedral		12 m (39 ft)	4	Yes	1705	Church	Belgium	Mechelen	Made by Jacob Willmore in 1705. The hour hand was 3.62m long. The hands were destroyed by German fire during the capture of Mechelen in 1914. The remains of the clock faces were only removed in 1963. The clock itself was preserved and still controls the ringing of the bells. In 2014, the inhabitants of Mechelen decided against the restoration of the dials in a referendum.	
1	Crystal Palace		40 ft (12 m)	1	No	1862/1876	Building	UK	Sydenham, London	Made by E. J. Dent and installed in the 1862 International Exhibition building. It was moved to the Crystal Palace in Sydenham in November 1876. It was destroyed along with the Crystal Palace itself during the 1936 fire.	
2	Singer Factory Clock	Video	26 ft (7.9 m)	4		1885	Building	Scotland, UK	Clydebank	Located at the Singer factory in Clydebank, the four-sided clock was mounted in a 200 ft (61 m) tower. The clock, which had become a local landmark, was demolished in a factory modernisation program in 1963	

== See also ==
- List of clocks
- List of tallest clock towers

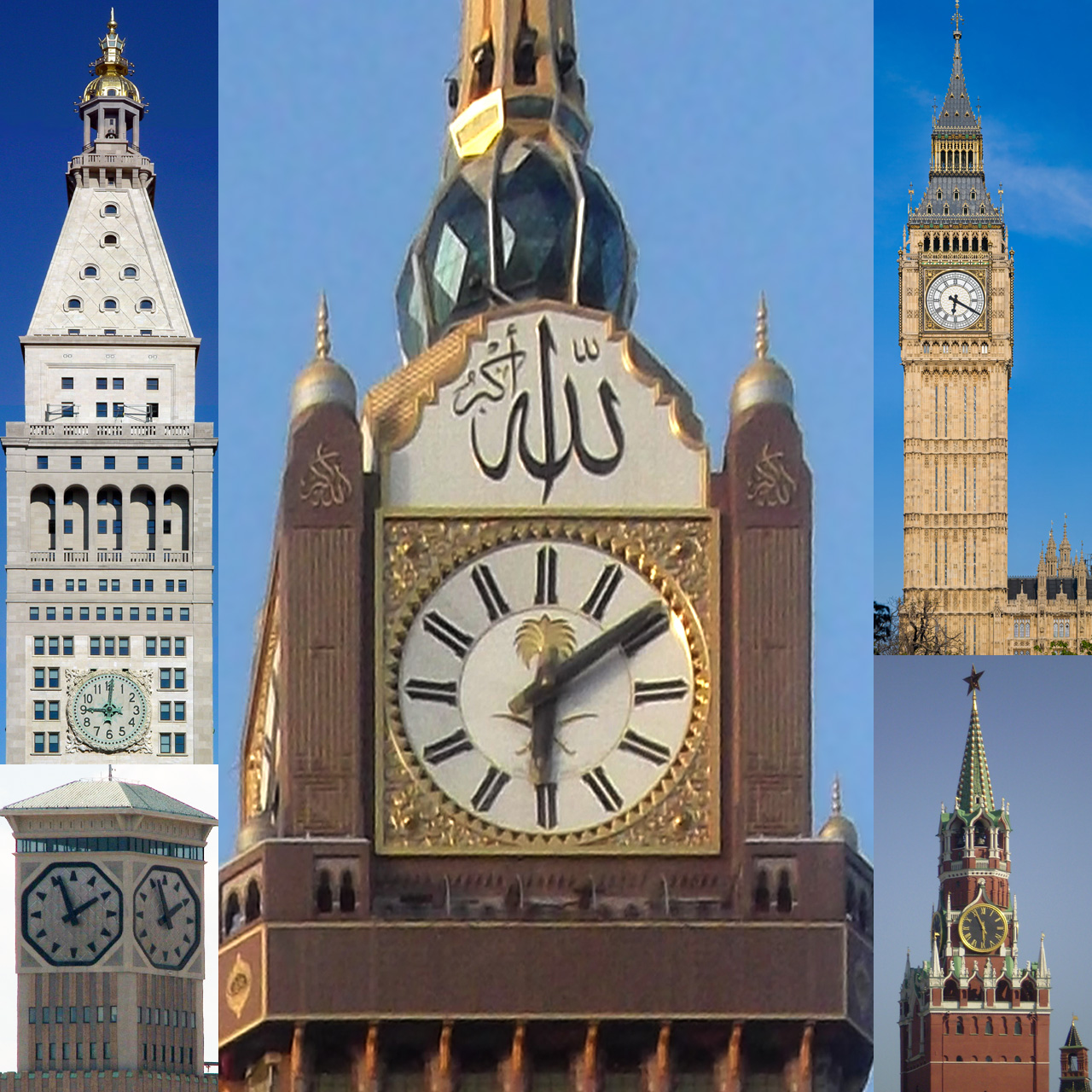
Comparison of some notable four-face clocks at the same scale.: Top-left: / Metropolitan Life Insurance Company Tower; Bottom-left: / Allen-Bradley Clock Tower (previous largest); Middle: / Abraj Al Bait; Top-right: / Elizabeth Tower ("Big Ben"); Bottom-right: / Kremlin Clock
