= The Clock Tower =

The Clock Tower may refer to:

- Elizabeth Tower, the clock tower of the Palace of Westminster, known as the Clock Tower prior to it being renamed in 2012
- Joseph Chamberlain Memorial Clock Tower, a clock tower at the University of Birmingham
