= Dordoni =

Dordoni is a surname. Notable people with the surname include:

- Giovanni Battista Dordoni (died 1599), Italian painter
- Pino Dordoni (1926–1998), Italian Olympic athlete

== Other uses ==
- Dordoni Alessandro Del Socaccio, manga/anime character
