= Duquesne Brewing Company =

Brewery in Pittsburgh, Pennsylvania

- Location: Latrobe, Pennsylvania
- Opened: 1899 – 1972; 2008 – present
- Owner: Mark Dudash
- Website: www.duquesne.beer

Active beers
Name	Type
Duquesne Pilsener	(Pilsener)
Duquesne LT	(Light Beer)
Fort Pitt Ale	(Ale)

Inactive beers
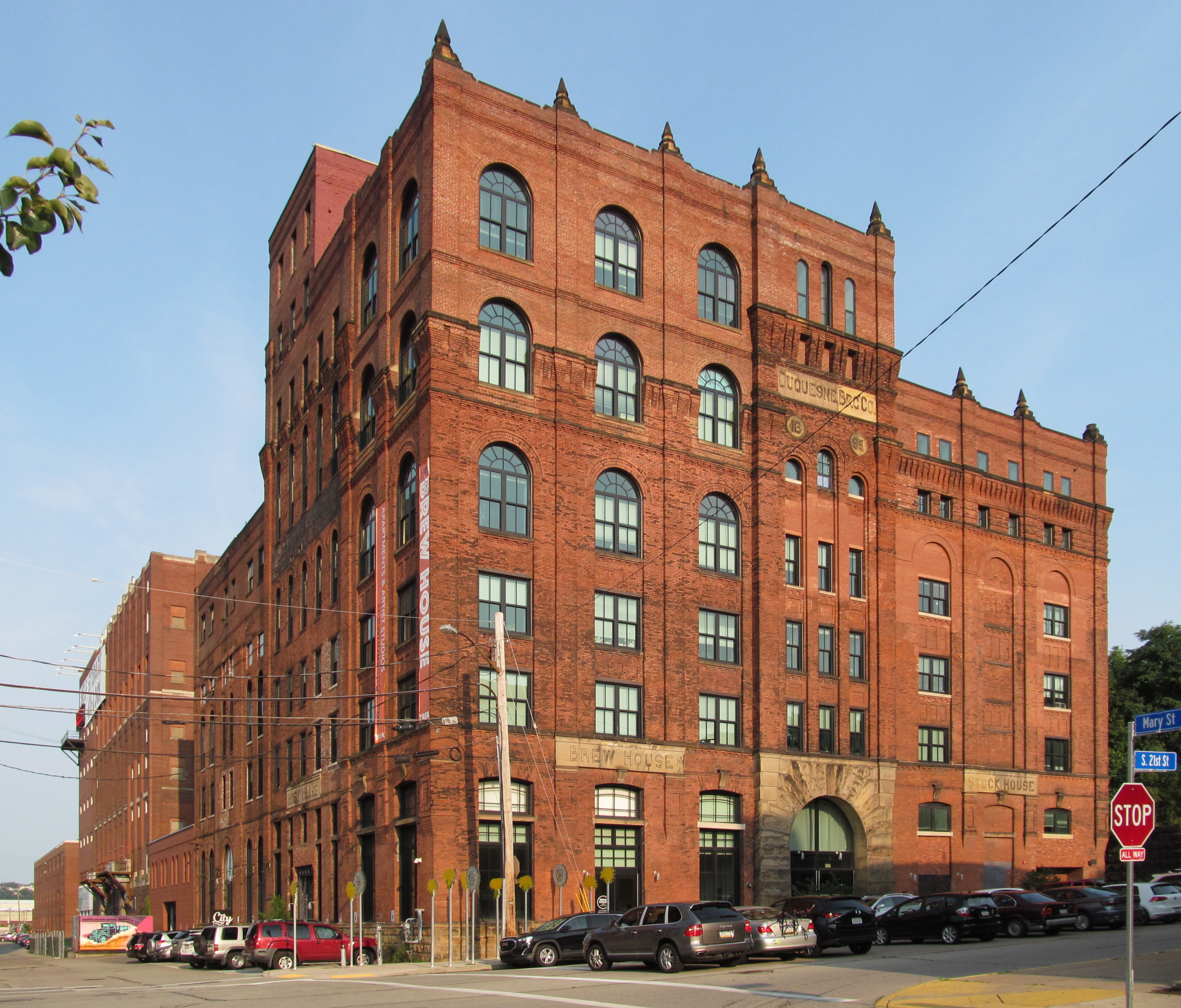

Name	Type
Silver Top Lager	Pilsner
Silver Top Ale	Ale
Duke Ale	Ale
Duquesne Pilsener	Pilsner
Duquesne Bavarian Beer	?
Duquesne Bock Beer	Bock
Duquesne Heavy-Dry Beer	?
Duquesne Draft Beer	Draught
Old Nut Brown Ale	Brown ale
Frontenac Pale Ale	Pale Ale
Carnegie Beer	Pilsner
Duquesne Buccaneer Beer	?
Duquesne Brewing Company
U.S. National Register of Historic Places
Old Brewhouse, Duquesne Brewing Company
Location within Pittsburgh Location within Pennsylvania Location within the United States
Location	Roughly bounded by S. 21st, S. 23rd & Jane Sts., Harcum & Edwards Ways, Pittsburgh, Pennsylvania
Coordinates	40.42596°N 79.97672°W
NRHP reference No.	15000217
Added to NRHP	May 11, 2015

The Duquesne Brewing Company was a major brewery in Pittsburgh, Pennsylvania, from its founding in 1899 until its dissolution in 1972. The brand was revived under the name Duquesne Brewing Company in 2008, in order to re-establish the beer in Western Pennsylvania starting in the summer of 2010.

== History ==
=== Founding ===
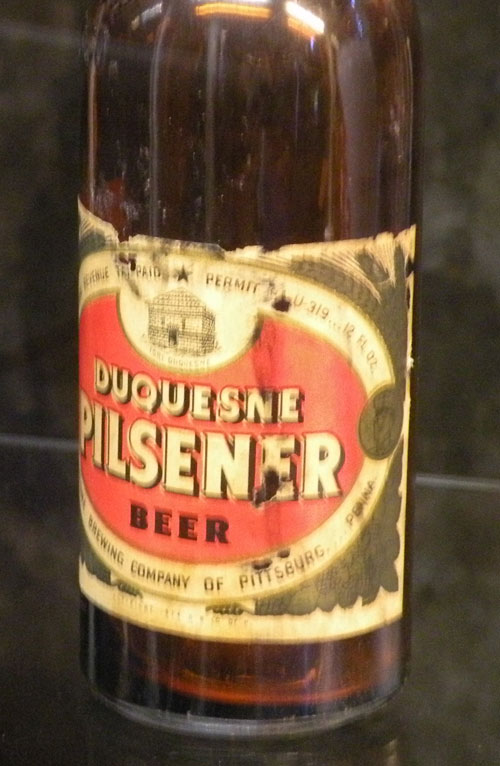
Old bottle of Duquesne Pilsener showing the Fort Pitt Blockhouse mislabeled as "Fort Duquesne".

The Duquesne Brewing Company was officially incorporated on April 4, 1899. The first president was Henry Miller, formerly a furniture salesman. The original trademark of the brand was a depiction of Fort Duquesne (though it actually featured a depiction of the Fort Pitt Blockhouse with the words "Fort Duquesne" underneath it), and the more recognizable "Prince of Pilseners" trademark was added later.

The brewery decided to use refrigerated train cars to ship the beer, an innovative move in the early twentieth century. A Chicago stockyard man, Max Epstein, connected Duquesne with Armour and Company, and had Duquesne's company logo emblazoned on one of the cars. At first sight, the Duquesne reps thought the car was a giant billboard for their company and purchased twenty cars. The money that Epstein netted from the sale enabled him to found the General American Transportation Corporation.

Even before Prohibition, Pittsburgh's brewing operations had begun to combine into fewer players, with most ending up under either the umbrella of the Pittsburgh Brewing Company or the Independent Brewing Company of Pittsburgh. Duquesne was among fifteen joining the latter in 1905.

=== Prohibition ===
Starting in 1920, Prohibition forced many breweries, distillers, and taverns to close. Duquesne was one of only 725 American breweries left when the Eighteenth Amendment was repealed in April 1933. In 1937, the company renamed itself as the Duquesne Brewing Company of Pittsburgh. The company, reformed under their original charter, emerged as the largest brewing company in Pennsylvania at a yearly production rate of 325,000 barrels.

=== Expansion ===
Duquesne's production capacity increased to two million barrels after World War II when a new building opened at the South Side site in 1950, making it one of the top ten breweries in the United States. The company's best known brand was "Duke," and its popular advertising slogan was "Have a Duke!"

The company had plants in Carnegie (Plant 3) and McKees Rocks (Plant 2), in addition to the South Side flagship brewery, although those soon closed after the new brew house opened at Plant 1 in 1950 (Plant 3 closed in 1952, and Plant 2 in 1950). The curved profile of the 1950 building at Plant 1 was to accommodate the PRR Whitehall Branch, which serviced the brewery from sidings along and off Mary Street.

In January 1963, Duquesne expanded into the Cleveland market by purchasing the rights to P.O.C. Beer from the Pilsener Brewing Company after they closed their plant.

=== Dissolution ===
While the company had been profitable through the 1950s, profits had declined by 1962 to $211,586 and the trend showed no sign of abating. A proposed 1965 acquisition by Pittsburgh Brewing ran afoul of anti-trust laws, and was enjoined in United States v. Pittsburgh Brewing Co. and Milton G. Hulme. The Friday family, longtime stewards of the brand, would lose control to investor Raymond Sigesmund in a stock battle in 1966. Sigesmund brought in his son-in-law, Franklyn D. Jeans, to run the brewery, but the problems continued. Jeans fired Lando, Inc., the company which had replaced long-time agency Vic Maitland in 1965 on the Duquesne Brewing advertising account, and replaced them with his own company, Admark.

Sales at Duquesne Beer had fallen to $13 million by 1971. The company, due to competition from national brands sold its labels to C. Schmidt & Sons Brewing Company of Philadelphia in late 1972, and closed the flagship plant. Schmidt brewed Duquesne in Cleveland into the 1980s, but sales fell drastically after Allegheny County commissioner Thomas Foerster called for a boycott of out-of-town beers; by the very end of the beer's production, the packaging was even changed to look like Schmidt's.

=== Revival ===
In June 2010, Pittsburgh-area attorney Mark J. Dudash announced plans to resurrect the Duquesne Beer brand, to be brewed by City Brewing Company at the Latrobe, PA. Paula and Bill Clevenger bought the company in 2024 and began production in March 2025.

== Beers ==
The Duquesne Brewery's brands included Silver Top Lager, Silver Top Ale, Duke Ale, Duquesne Pilsener, Duquesne Bavarian Beer, Duquesne Bock Beer, Duquesne Heavy-Dry Beer, Duquesne Draft Beer, Duquesne Porter, Old Nut Brown Ale, Frontenac Pale Ale, Duquesne Beer, Carnegie Beer and Duquesne Buccaneer Beer.

In 2015 Duquesne introduced the Paterno Legacy Series to commemorate late football coach Joe Paterno. The brewery reported the commemorative cans sold quickly.

As of 2025, the revived Duquesne Brewing Company continues to brew its flagship Duquesne Pilsener and Duquesne LT, a light beer, with future plans to release additional iconic recipes.

== Duquesne Brewery ==
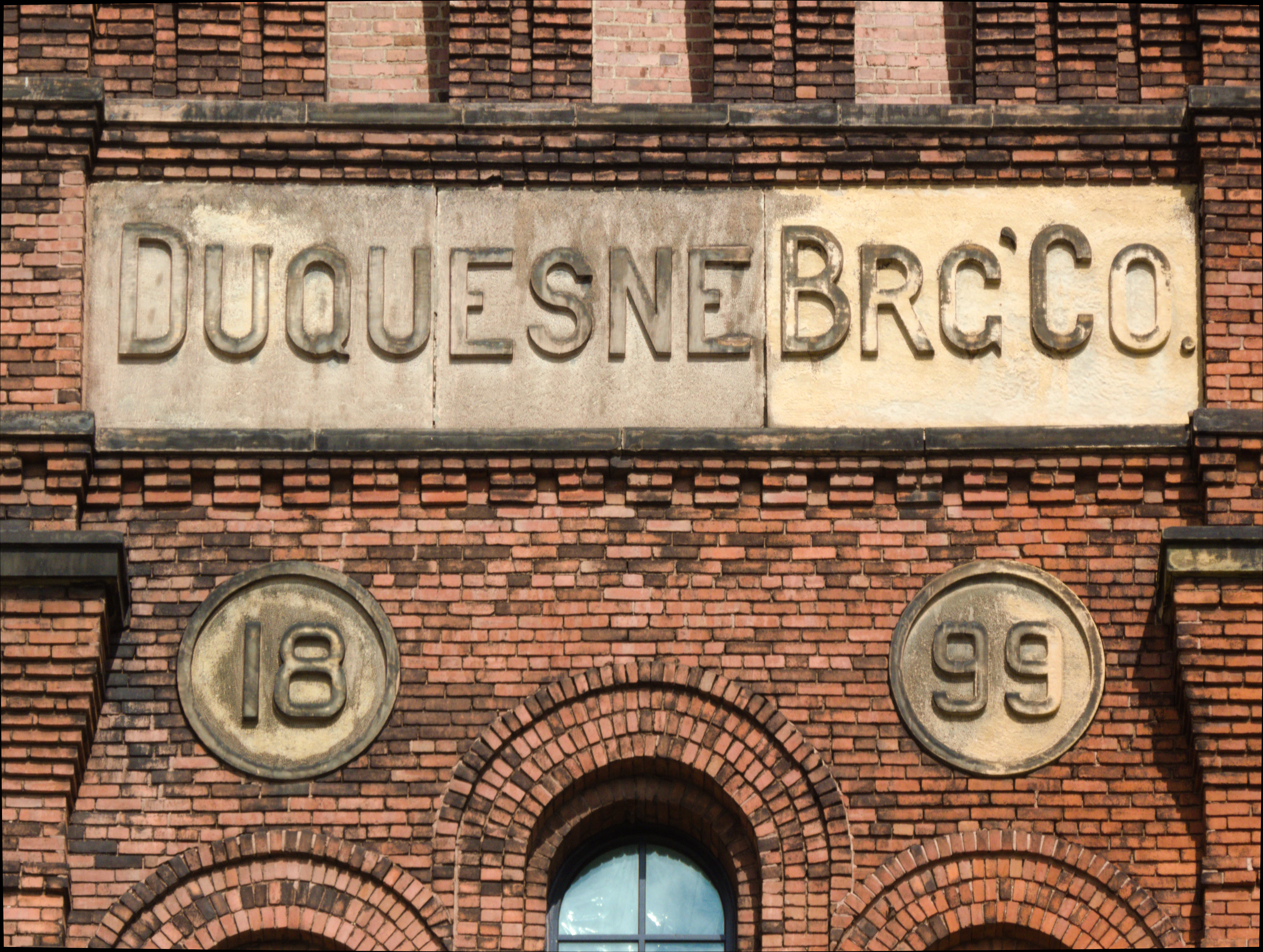
Detail of the 1899 Duquesne Brewery building

The former Duquesne Brewery complex is located along Mary Street between South 21st and 23rd Streets in the South Side Flats neighborhood. The complex consists of seven extant buildings:

- Old Brewhouse (1899 with several additions between 1905 and 1950)
- Bottling House B (circa 1900 with a 1949 addition)
- Shipping Building (circa 1936 with two 1950s-era additions)
- Office (circa 1948)
- Warehouse (circa 1949)
- New Brewhouse (1950)
- Bottling House A (1956)

These surviving historic elements of the brewery were listed on the National Register of Historic Places in 2015.

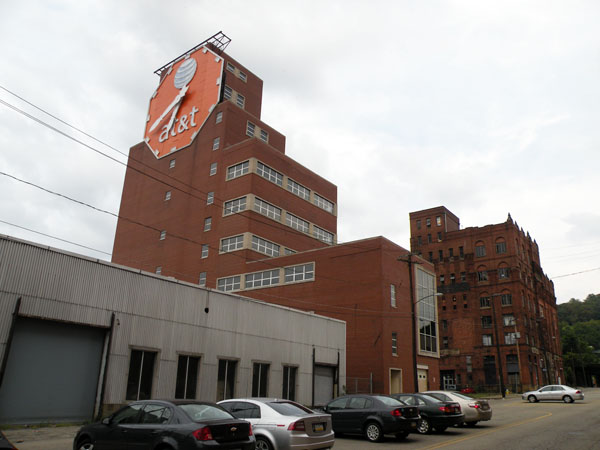
The 1950 brewhouse building with its large clock, seen here displaying advertising for AT&T

The 1899 brewhouse building, located at Mary Street and 21st Street, now is home to the Brew House Association, which provides housing, studio space, and a gallery for Pittsburgh artists. The adjacent 1950 brewhouse building has been partially restored. The cellar and keg department is now the home of Crossfit Athletics, a functional fitness gym. A storage and garage building has become living space. The former office building has become Beitler-McKee Optical. The bottling works has become U.S. Cargo. Raff Printing and Rynn's Luggage occupy the case storage and shipping buildings. The bridge between the bottling works and case storage stands, while the bridge connecting the two brewhouses has been dismantled.

=== Duquesne Brewery clock ===
The Duquesne Brewery is distinguishable from other buildings on Pittsburgh's South Side by its large clock, visible from throughout the city.
