= Duquesne Brewery Clock =

American landmark

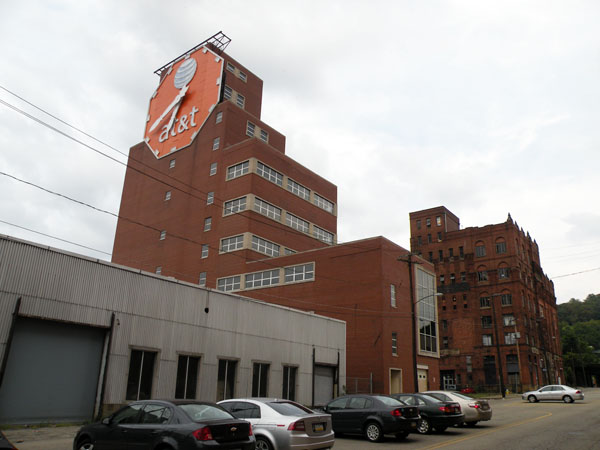
- The clock with AT&T logo on the face, as it appeared from 2009 to 2017

- Location within Pennsylvania
- 40.426158°N 79.9759895°W
- Location: Pittsburgh, Pennsylvania

History
- Built: 1933

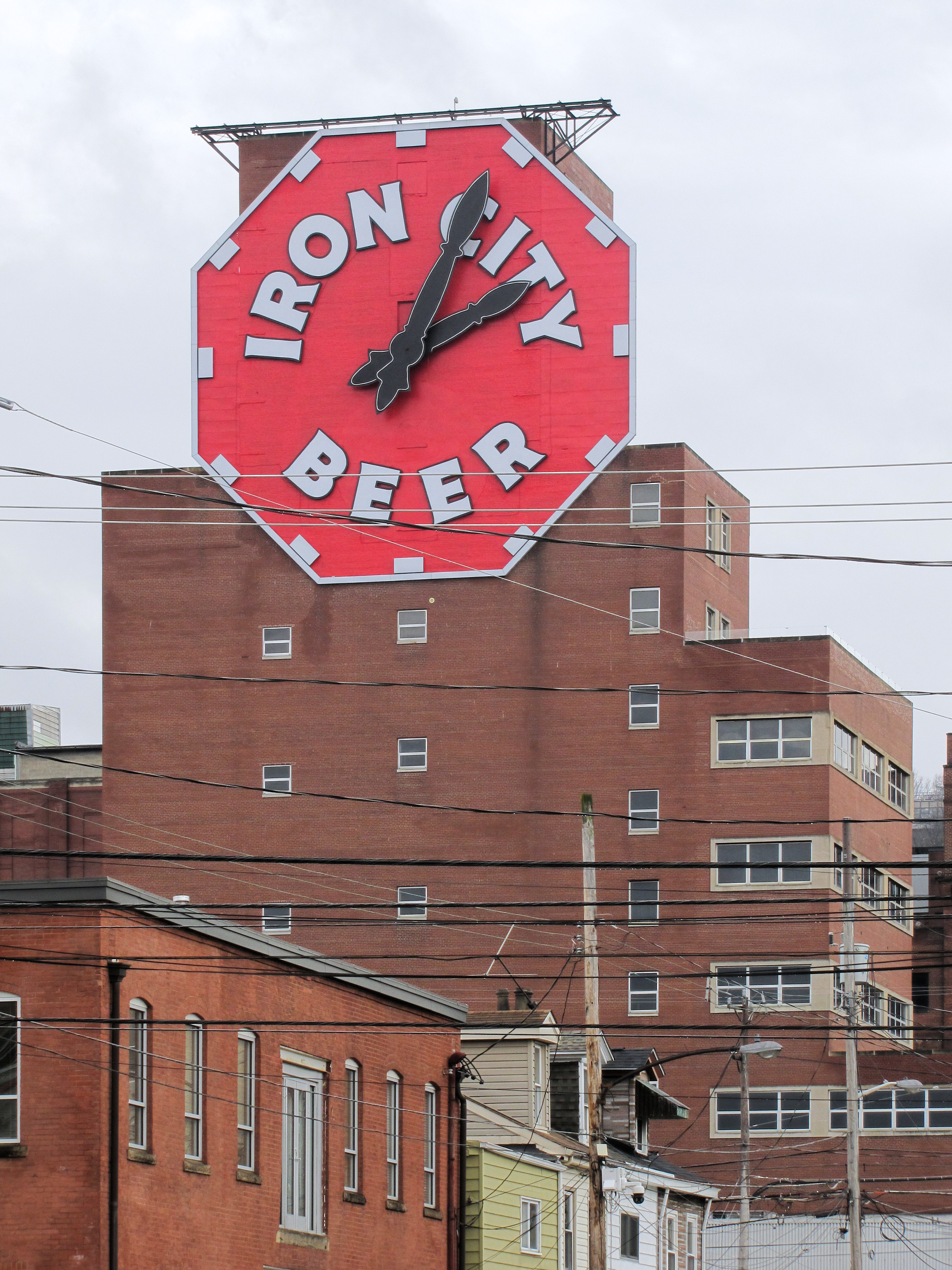
The Duquesne Brewery Clock in 2026, with advertisement for Iron City Beer

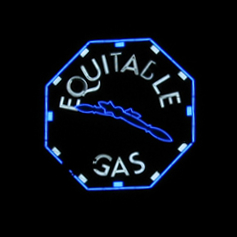
The clock advertising Equitable Gas, as it appeared from 2002 to 2009

Located on the Duquesne Brewing Company building in Pittsburgh, Pennsylvania, the Duquesne Brewery Clock was the largest single-face clock in the world when it was installed in 1933. Over the years its face has been used to advertise numerous brands, beginning with Coca-Cola. As it stands now, it is the largest clock in North America, and the seventh largest in the world.

== History ==
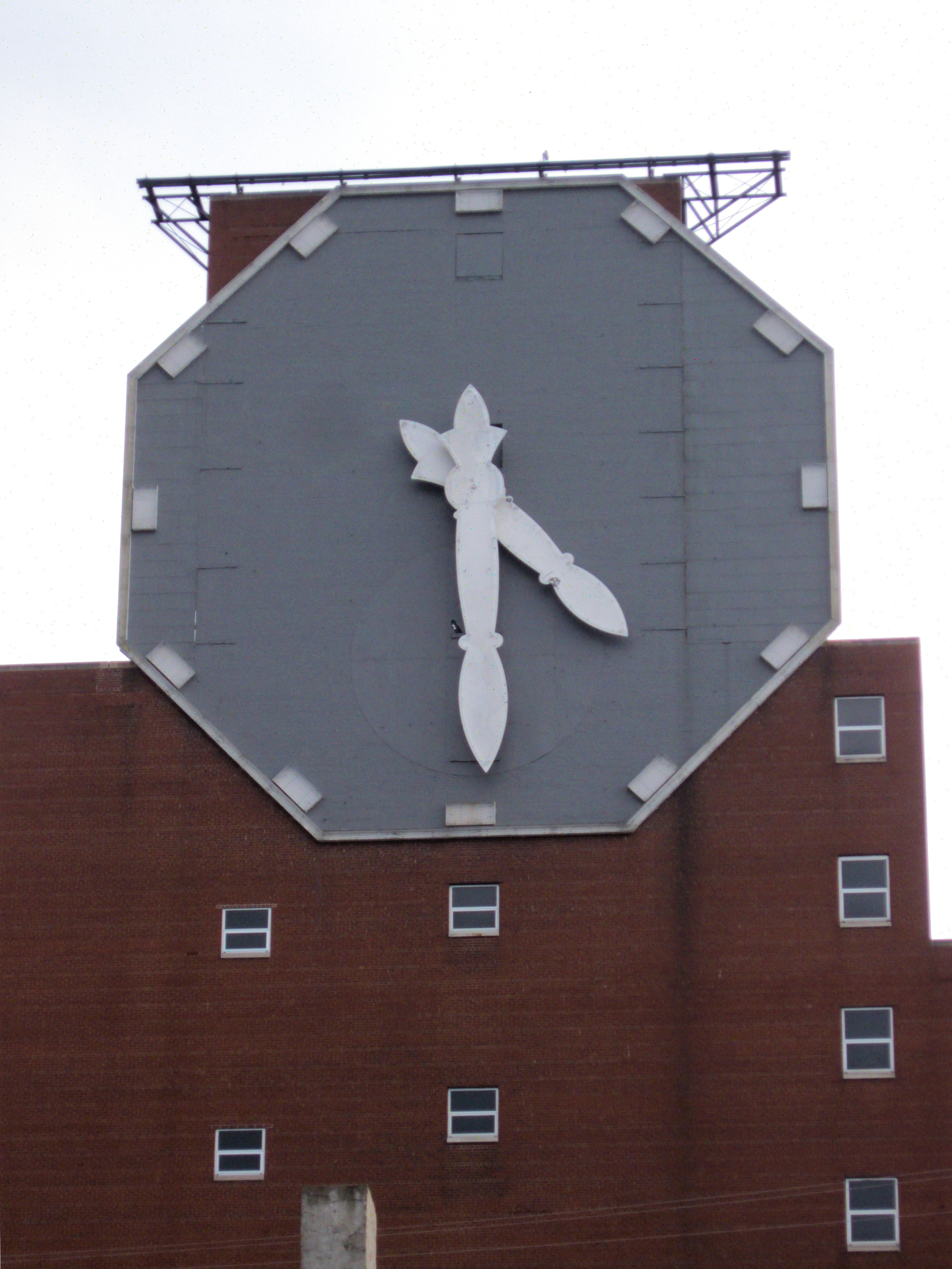
The Duquesne Brewery clock as it appeared from 2017 to 2025, with no advertising on the face

The 60-by-60-foot (18 m × 18 m) clock face, with a 35-foot (11 m) minute hand and a 25-foot (7.6 m) hour hand, both of laminated aluminum, is nearly twice the size of London's Big Ben, and was built in Georgia by Audichron for $12,500 and shipped to Pittsburgh. The clock, designed by Audichron founder John L. Franklin, is driven by a 1.25-horsepower (0.93 kW) Janett motor.

Originally located on a Mount Washington hillside, the clock's face was used as advertising for a succession of beverages, including Coca-Cola, and Fort Pitt, Ballantine, Carling, and Schlitz beers. In 1961, the Duquesne Brewing Company bought the clock, painted its "Have A Duke" slogan on the face and installed it atop its building in the South Side where it has been running since. After the brewery closed in 1972, the clock was leased to Stroh's Beer, then WTAE-TV Channel 4. After WTAE's lease ended in 1993, the clock continued to run without an ad. The Pittsburgh Brewing Company paid $44,000 to repair the clock when it took over in 1999, paying $5,000 a month to show its logo on the face. In 2002, Equitable Gas paid to have their name placed on the clock. In October 2009, AT&T took over the rights to advertise on the clock and redesigned the face to display the traditional blue and white AT&T logo.

Pittsburgh Brewing Company placed an ad for their Iron City beer on the clock face in August 2025, marking the first ad on the clock face since 2017.

== In popular culture ==
The clock is featured prominently in the 1983 movie Flashdance.
