= Brew House Association =

Coordinates: 40.425503°N 79.976156°W

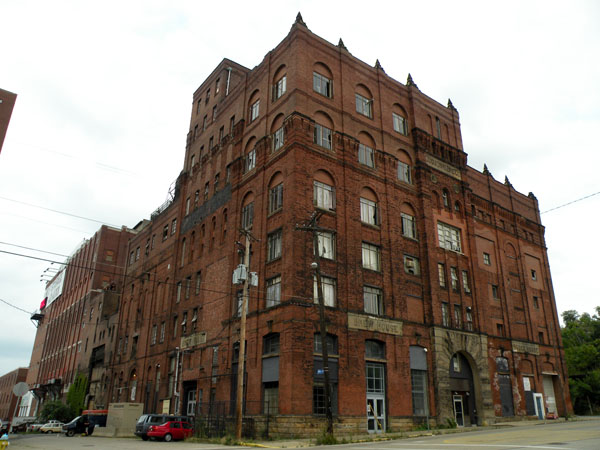
The old Duquesne Brewing Company building, built in 1899, is the home of the Brew House Association.

The Brew House Association is an artist collective established in 1991 in the South Side Flats neighborhood of Pittsburgh, Pennsylvania. It is located at Mary and 21st Streets in a multi-story building that once housed the Duquesne Brewing Company. The lower floors of the building have been converted to gallery and theater space, including SPACE 101, an alternative exhibit gallery founded by the Brew House Association in 1994, while the upper floors have become studio and living areas for resident artists, and shared workshops for welding and pottery. The Brew House and the abandoned industrial lots around it have been the site of performance art, theatre and sculpture exhibits. They formerly rented studio space, and hosted a residency program for visual artists before issues with building code violations forced them to temporarily close their doors in 2009.
