= Torre del Mangia =

Tower in Siena, Italy

Coordinates: 43°19′5.56″N 11°19′56.11″E

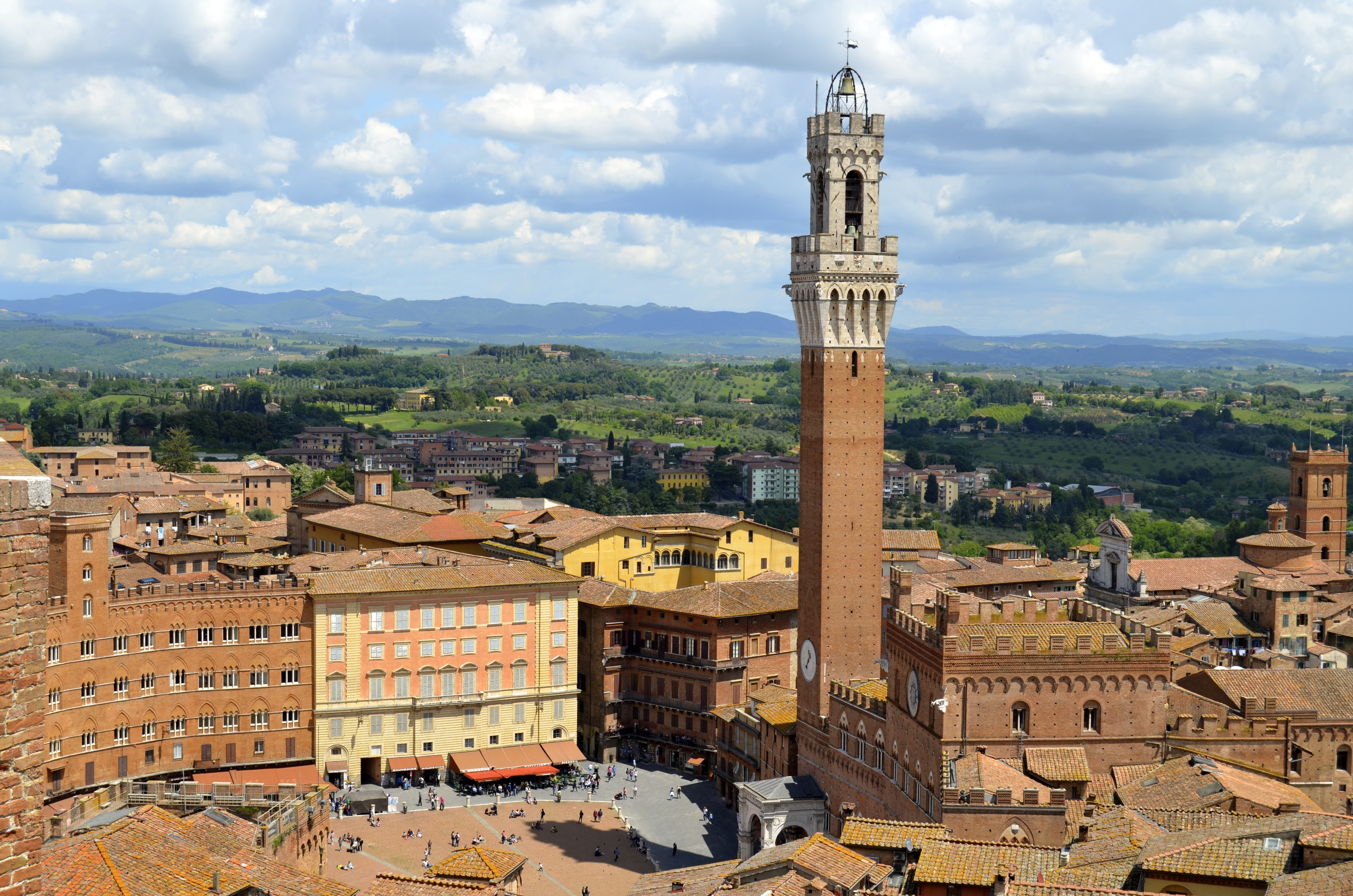
The Torre del Mangia towering above the center of Siena

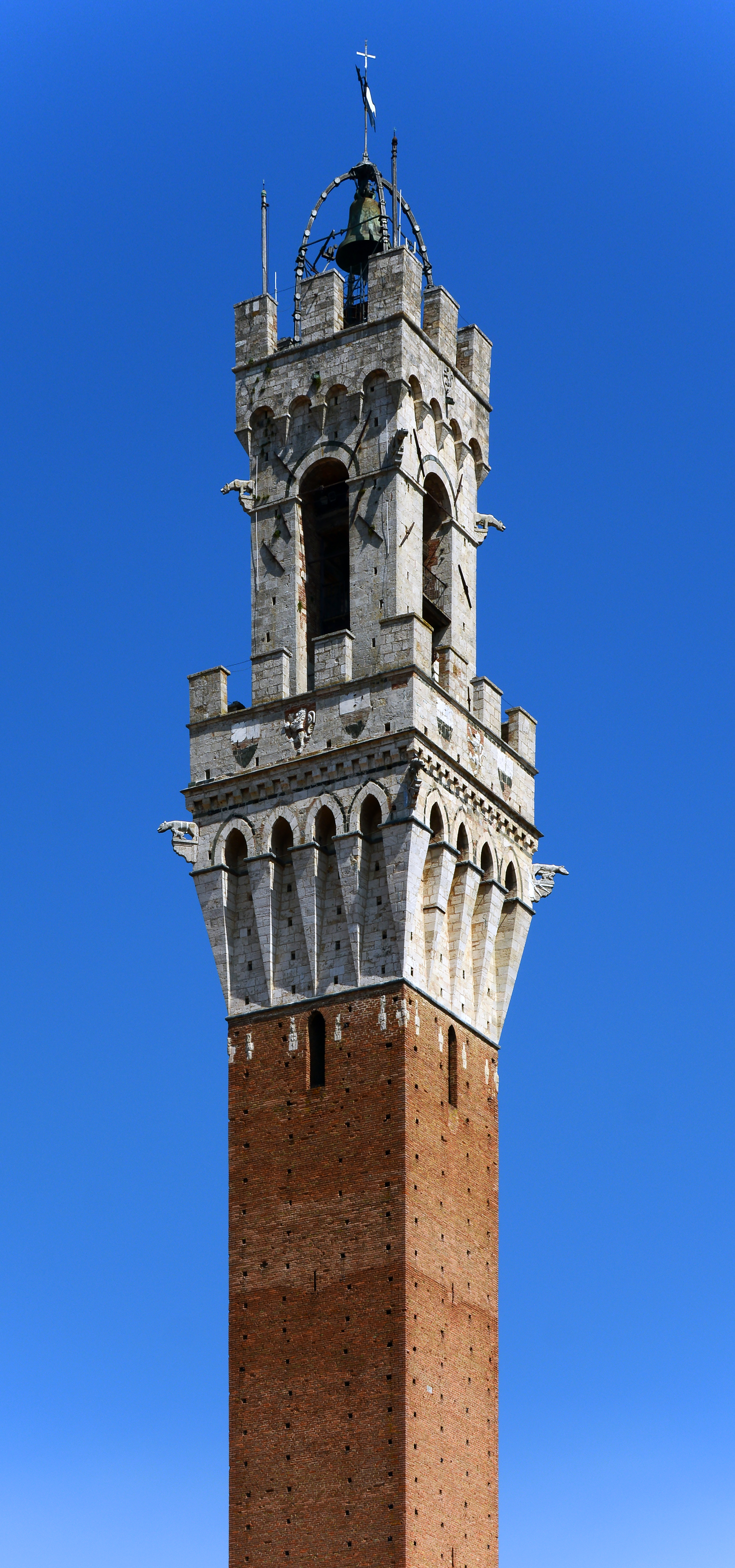
The upper portion of the tower, showing its distinct levels

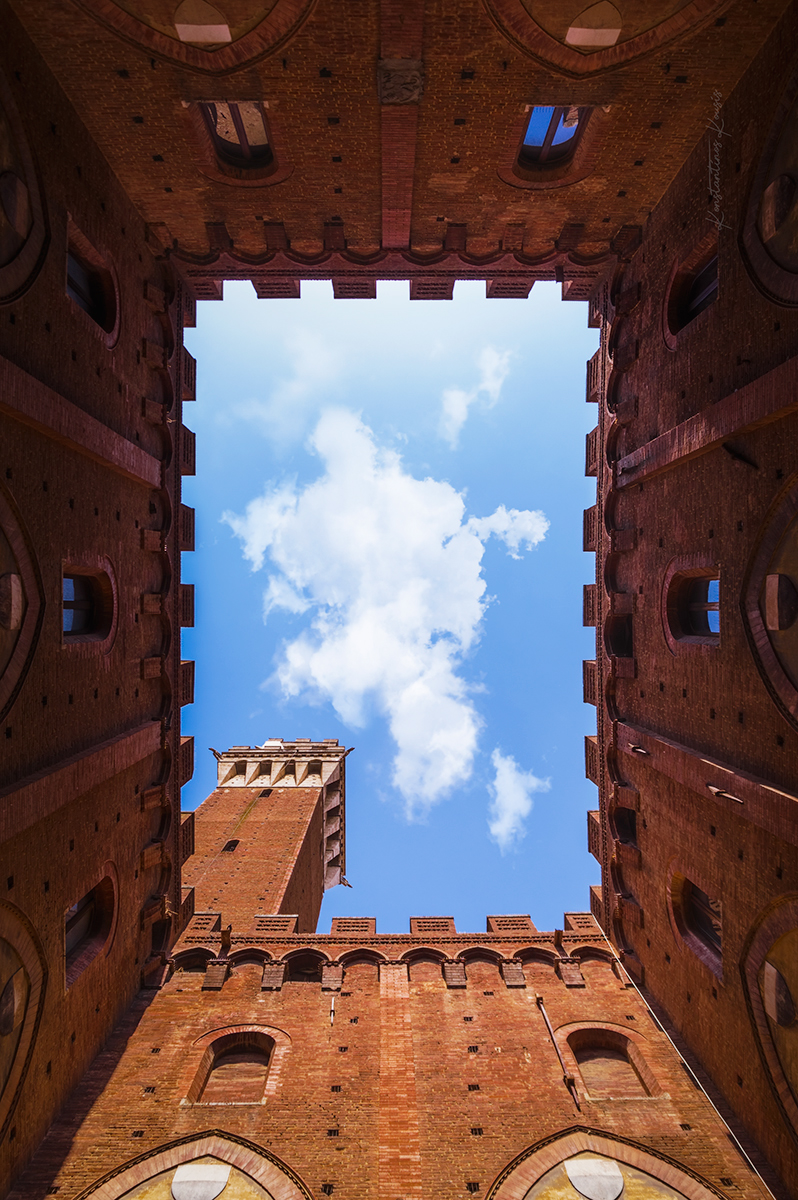
The tower viewed from the courtyard of the adjacent Palazzo Pubblico

The Torre del Mangia is a tower in Siena, in the Tuscany region of Italy. Built in 1338–1348, it is located in the Piazza del Campo, Siena's main square, next to the Palazzo Pubblico (Town Hall). When built it was one of the tallest secular towers in medieval Italy. At 102 m it is now Italy's second tallest after Cremona Cathedral's Torrazzo (112 m (367 ft)), the Asinelli tower in Bologna at 97 m being third.

== History ==
The tower was built to be exactly the same height as Siena Cathedral as a sign that the church and the state had equal power. (Note: Even though the 77-m cathedral bell tower is 10 m shorter than the Mangia tower, the cathedral site is about 10 m higher than the town hall site.)

The name refers to its first bellringer, Giovanni di Balduccio, nicknamed Mangiaguadagni (‘Profit eater’) either for his spendthrift tendency, idleness or gluttony.

== Sections ==
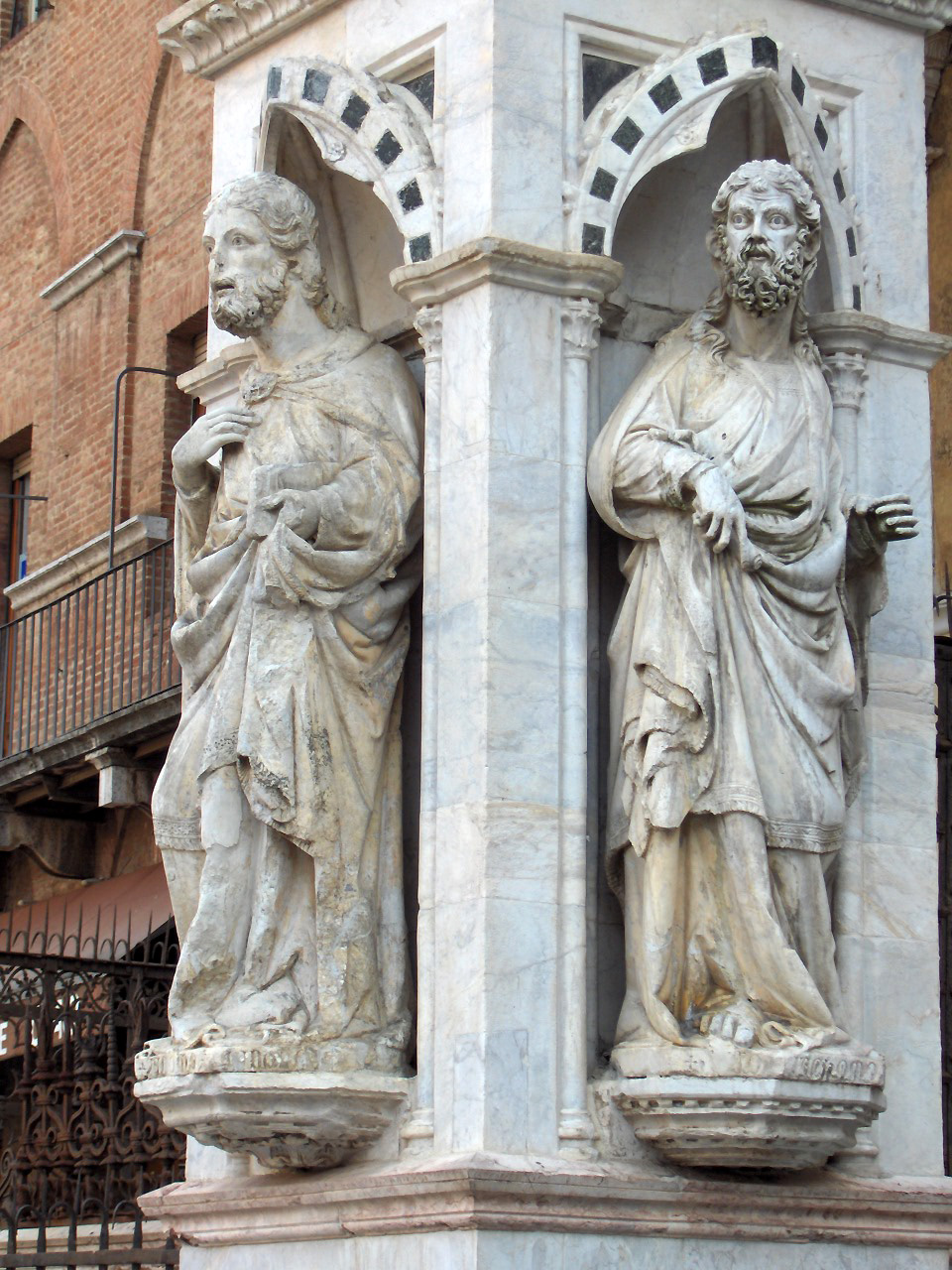
Statues on the loggia

The tower has visually distinct levels, from the bottom:

1. a marble loggia at the base
2. a long red brick shaft
3. a stone section that flares out slightly
4. a short pale-gray upper loggia
5. a marble (uppermost) structure.

The loggia where the tower meets the Piazza del Campo, known as the Cappella di Piazza, was added in 1352 to fulfil a vow to the Holy Virgin by Sienese survivors of the Black Death. The corner pilasters attained their current form in 1378, the sculptures decorating them being executed in 1378–1382 by Mariano d'Angelo Romanelli e Bartolomeo di Tommé. The simple wooden ceiling once covering the loggia was replaced by the current Renaissance marble vault in 1461–1468 by Antonio Federighi, also responsible for the bizarre decorations of the coronation. In 1537–1539 Il Sodoma painted a fresco above the altar, now housed in the town museum in the Palazzo Pubblico.

The upper-middle part in stone was built by Agostino di Giovanni to the design of one Mastro Lippo pittore, probably identifiable with Lippo Memmi. It consists of a parapet resting on corbels. The pronounced petal-like arches between the corbels have led writers to describe the structure as a tulip or lily.

The clock on the lower part of the shaft was added in 1360. There are three bells, the largest one is called the "Sunto" – an abbreviation of assunto, a reference to the assumption of the Virgin. The bell plays a notable role in the celebrations of the Palio.

The walls of the tower are approximately 3 m (9.8 ft) thick on each side.

== Towers inspired by the Torre del Mangia ==
A number of towers have been inspired by the Torre del Mangia. These include:

- The Joseph Chamberlain Memorial Clock Tower (nicknamed Old Joe) at the University of Birmingham, UK, was inspired by the Torre del Mangia, and couples a similar design with Victorian redbrick styles.
- The clock tower of Waterbury Union Station in Waterbury, Connecticut is strongly influenced by the Torre del Mangia. Designed by McKim, Mead & White and completed in 1909, it housed the headquarters of the region's daily newspaper until its sale to Hearst Communications in 2025.
- The all-granite Pilgrim Monument at Provincetown, Massachusetts is a scaled-down near replica of the Torre del Mangia, but for its materials and height. Designed by Willard T. Sears, it was built from 1907 to 1910 to commemorate the 21 November 1620 landing of the Mayflower Pilgrims there. The 77-metre-tall (253 ft) monument is the tallest all-granite structure in the United States.
- The Dock Tower in Grimsby, North East Lincolnshire, UK. Built in 1852 and standing 94 m (308 ft) tall, the vertical reservoir provided hydraulic power to open the lock gates of the Royal Dock. Although obsolete from 1892 onward, it remains a proud monument to the town and its rich fishing history.
- The tower at the Pine Street Inn at the South End of Boston, Massachusetts, formerly a fire station and fire watch tower, is also modelled on the Torre del Mangia. Boston's tower, which is 48 m (157 ft) tall, designed and built in 1892 by Edmund March Wheelwright, is made of brick like the Italian original and was originally designed as part of the central fire station and used as a fire lookout.
- The main building of the Spanish business & law school, ICADE, in Madrid, is topped with a clock tower modelled on the Torre de Mangia.

== See also ==
- Palio di Siena
- List of tallest structures built before the 20th century
