= Nutmeg (train) =

Former U.S. intercity rail service

Overview
- Service type: Inter-city rail
- Status: Discontinued
- Locale: Northeastern United States
- Predecessor: Highland Express
- First service: 1950
- Last service: 1955
- Former operator: New York, New Haven and Hartford Railroad

Route
- Termini: Boston, Massachusetts; Waterbury, Connecticut
- Distance travelled: 148.5 miles (239.0 km)
- Average journey time: 3 hours, 57 minutes (eastbound); 3 hours, 42 minutes (westbound)
- Service frequency: Daily, except Saturday, Sunday & holidays (1955)
- Train numbers: Eastbound: 128; Westbound: 129

Technical
- Track gauge: 4 ft 8 1/2 in (1,435 mm) standard gauge

The Nutmeg train was a unique east-west train through Massachusetts and Connecticut which did not travel along the Atlantic Coast; in the course of following its route it connected several of Connecticut's medium-sized cities. Operated by the New York, New Haven and Hartford Railroad (NH) from 1950, it took a route from Boston's South Station, running through southwestern Boston suburbs but making no stops until Blackstone, Massachusetts, then through northeast Connecticut along the path of the old Southbridge and Blackstone Railroad, divisions of the old New York and New England Railroad to Hartford's Union Station, and finally to Waterbury's Union Station. Running directly through northeastern Connecticut, it made a shorter trip than the itineraries through Springfield, Massachusetts that the New Haven offered.

== History ==
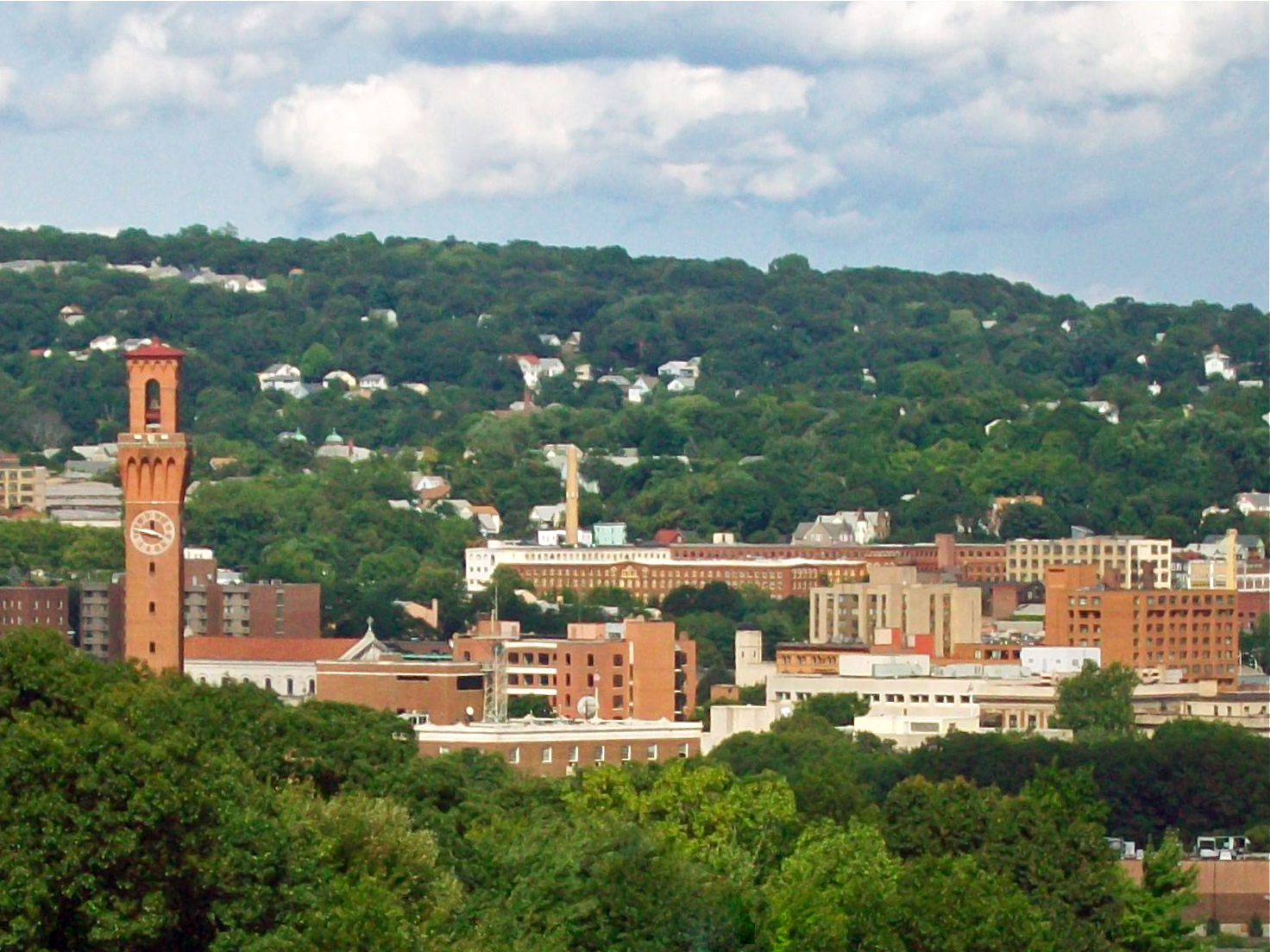
View of the western terminus, Waterbury Union Station

The Nutmeg followed an earlier Highland Express along the same route in the 1930s. There were other unnamed trains that followed this route; however, these were local trains and most of them did not go further west than Hartford. Even in earlier years, such as 1921, travelers continuing west on the same line beyond Waterbury, along territory of the former Central New England Railway, to Danbury, Brewster, Hopewell Junction, Poughkeepsie and Campbell Hall, New York in the mid-Hudson Valley, would need to transfer in Hartford or Waterbury for a Hartford - Campbell Hall train.

The Nutmeg was a weekday train, and there were local running trains that made the trip on weekends. The NH could not continue the route further west to Danbury or to Putnam County, New York because the company had removed tracks from essential points from Waterbury west to Southbury in 1937.

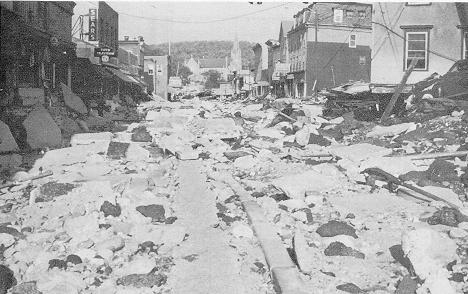
Flood damage in Winsted, Connecticut from Diane

The route was rendered unusable after a major flood during Hurricane Diane in August 1955 washed out the bridge over the Quinebaug River, west of Putnam, Connecticut. The flood led to the suspension of passenger train traffic between Blackstone, Massachusetts and Hartford. The New Haven RR continued daily unnamed trains between Waterbury and Hartford, and several trains a day between Blackstone and Boston. The Waterbury-Hartford service ended in 1960. With the closing of the route, Connecticut's interior cities no longer have east-west travel options available by rail.

The eastern section, from Franklin to Boston, Massachusetts remains in use by the Massachusetts Bay Transportation Authority's Franklin/Foxboro Line.

== Major stops ==
- Boston, Massachusetts
- Willimantic, Connecticut
- Manchester
- Hartford
- New Britain
- Waterbury
