= Independent Brewing Company of Pittsburgh =

- Logo of the IBC, as printed in an advertisement in the Pittsburgh Press (July 28, 1905)
- Location: Pittsburgh, Pennsylvania, USA
- Opened: January 7, 1905
- Closed: 1933

The Independent Brewing Company of Pittsburgh (IBC) was a conglomerate of breweries, formed by the merger of fifteen Pittsburgh breweries in 1905.

== History ==
Around the turn of the century, there were a total of fifty-eight breweries involved in mergers across Pennsylvania. The Pennsylvania Central Brewing Company accounted for twelve breweries in Luzerne and Lackawana Counties, the Consumers Brewing Company in Philadelphia accounted for six, and the Erie Brewing Company for four. Most breweries in the western Pennsylvania area coalesced into two competing groups, forming either the Pittsburgh Brewing Company (twenty-one breweries) or the Independent Brewing Company of Pittsburgh (fifteen breweries).

The company was incorporated on January 7, 1905, with capital of $10,000. Unlike the Pittsburgh Brewing Company, whose breweries were located primarily in the city itself, the Independent Brewing Company of Pittsburgh's breweries were in towns surrounding the city.

By 1907, the company had capital of $13,500,000. In 1916, the company claimed a capacity of 1,200,000 barrels. After Prohibition, however, only five branches of IBC and three of the PBC remained. The Duquesne Brewery, which had always been the foremost of the IBC's branches, was the only to return in 1933, operating under the Independent Brewing Company's name. It had already obtained a permit to brew the new 3.2-percent beer allowed by the Cullen–Harrison Act by March 1933; the company sent a case of the beer to President Franklin Roosevelt on April 5, 1933, as a gift. A crowd of 25,000 jubilant people gathered at the IBC's plant in Pittsburgh's South Side as legal beer was allowed to flow "unlicensed and uncontrolled" at 12:01 a.m. on April 7.

The name was changed back to the Duquesne Brewing Company of Pittsburgh sometime before 1934. The IBC brand would be dormant until 2013, when brothers Matthew and Peter Kurzweg re-established the name for their independent bar in the Squirrel Hill area of Pittsburgh. Opened on February 15, 2014, the "Indy" focuses on western Pennsylvanian small batch craft beers, much like those made by the original Independent Brewing Company.

== Branches ==
The following breweries operated under the auspices of the Independent Brewing Company of Pittsburgh:

Brewery name	Location	Years active in IBC
Anderton	Beaver Falls	1904–1920
Home	Braddock	1904–1920
Butler	Butler	1904–1912; 1918–1920
Chartiers Valley (Note: Later became Plant #3 of Duquesne Brewing (1933–1952))	Carnegie	1904–1920
Charleroi	Charleroi	1904–1920
Homestead	Homestead	1904–1920
Loyalhanna	Latrobe	1906–1920
First National (Note: Later became Plant #2 of Duquesne Brewing (1933–1951))	McKees Rocks	1904–1920
Monessen	Monessen	1905–1920
Globe	Monongahela	1904–1920
Hill Top	Mount Oliver	1904–1920
New Kensington	New Kensington	1904–1920
American	Pittsburgh	1905–1920
Duquesne (Note: Later renamed Duquesne Brewing Company of Pittsburgh, Plant #1 (1933–1972))	Pittsburgh	1905–1933
Lutz & Son	Pittsburgh	1904–1909

== See also ==
- List of defunct breweries in the United States
