= Waterbury Union Station =

- U.S. National Register of Historic Places
- Tower and east elevation, 2011
- Location: Waterbury, Connecticut
- Coordinates: 41°33′18″N 73°2′49″W
- Area: 2.4 acres (0.97 ha)
- Built: 1909
- Architect: McKim, Mead & White
- Architectural style: Late 19th & 20th Century Revivals
- NRHP reference No.: 78002881
- Added to NRHP: March 8, 1978

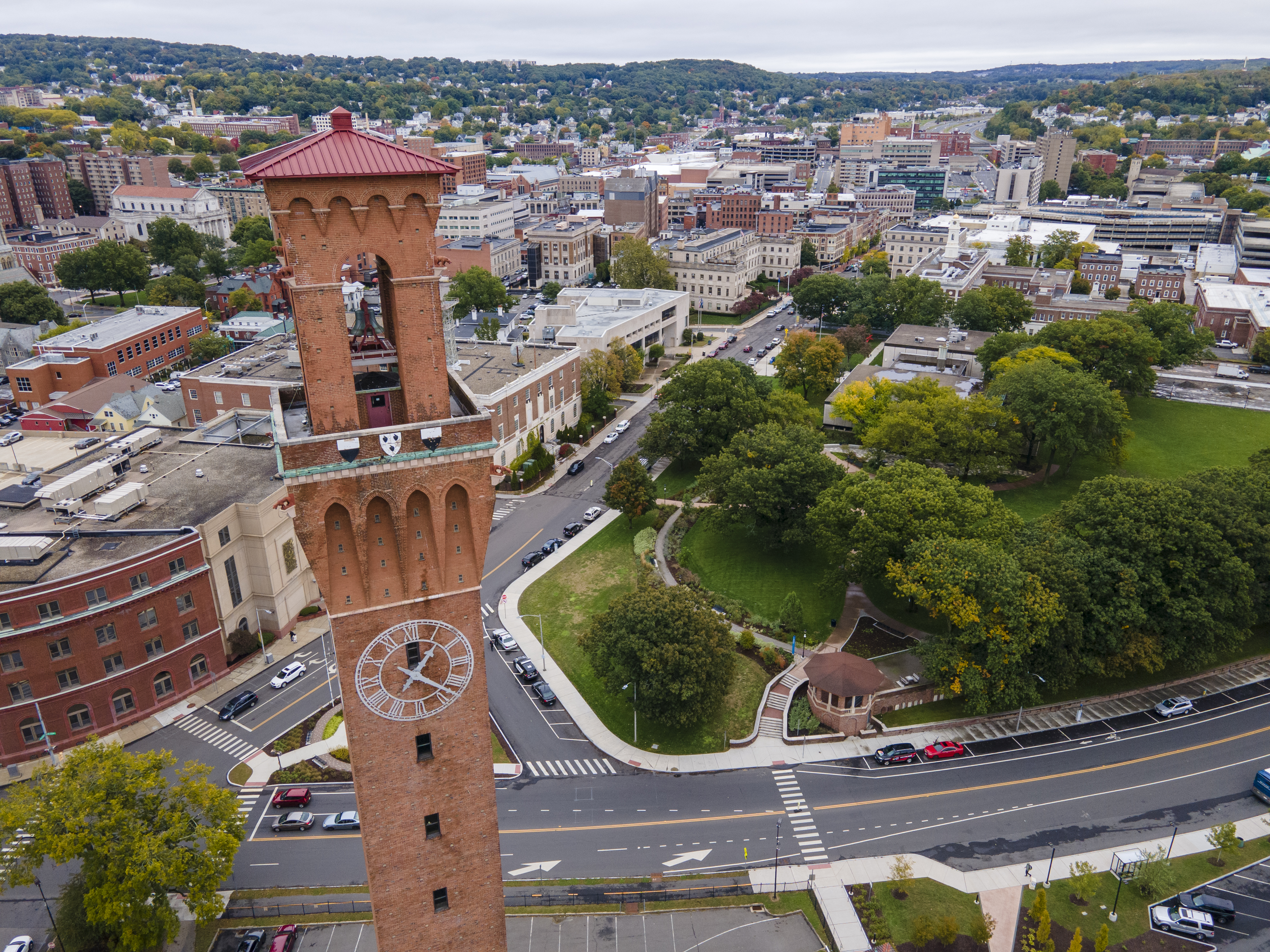
The Waterbury Union Station building clock tower is in Waterbury, Connecticut, on Wednesday, October 5, 2022. (Photo by Ted Shaffrey)

The Waterbury Union Station building is located at 389 Meadow Street in the city of Waterbury, Connecticut, United States. It is a brick building dating to the first decade of the 20th century. Its tall clock tower, built by the Seth Thomas Company, is the city's most prominent landmark.

Designed by the New York City architectural firm of McKim, Mead and White for the New York, New Haven and Hartford Railroad, it handled 66 passenger trains a day at its peak. Later in the 20th century, when the city's rail service had declined to its current level of one commuter route, the building's interior was closed. Today it is in use again as the offices of the Republican-American, Waterbury's daily newspaper.

== Building ==
The station building is located just west of downtown Waterbury, where Meadow and Grand streets intersect. To its north and south are other industrial buildings; southwest is the current platform station used by Metro-North and its parking facilities. On the west are 12 tracks, most of which are rarely used; beyond them are industrial buildings, the Naugatuck River and the Route 8 freeway. A short distance down Meadow Street are the on-ramps to the Interstate 84 viaduct carrying it over the river, tracks and Route 8.

=== Exterior ===
There are four sections to the building, counting the clock tower. The two-story main block has a low hip roof with the clock tower rising from the southeast corner. Two wings with a tiled hip roof project from either side of the main block. All are of brick laid in common bond on a granite foundation; at the roofline is a roll molding of terra cotta.

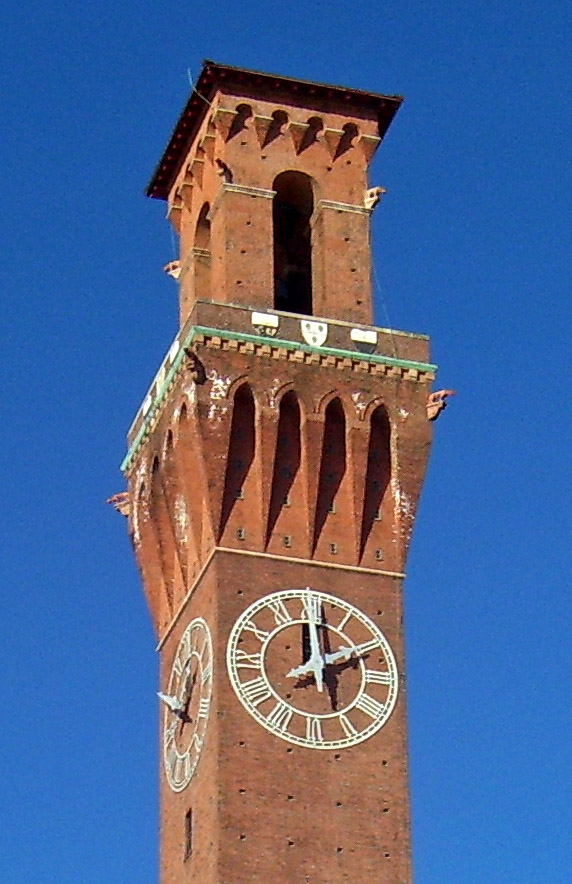
Clock tower detail

On the east (front) facade of the main block are three two-story round-arched window openings, filled in near the top where a new floor was later added. They are outlined in terra cotta in a stylized vine pattern, bordered by pearl, egg-and-dart and anthemion molding. Spacing them are four round medallions made of two rings of raised radial brick and a raised ring of fasces molding. Above is a course of terra cotta round-arched corbel table topped by egg-and-dart, a frieze with cherubs and projecting leaf molding. The level above has a series of small rectangular windows, three above each arch and one above each medallion. At the roofline is a cornice similar to the one below but more intricate, with carved modillions, a fluted frieze and wide carved cyma molding. The west facade is similar, although smaller windows and awnings have been added.

The lower two stages of the square tower have one narrow opening and the same cornices as the rest of the main block. Above its roofline the tower is plain for most of its 240-foot (73 m) height, except for some rows of small openings. The station clock faces on each side, marked in Roman numerals, are three-quarters of the way to the top. They and the clock hands are in cast aluminum. Above long tapered corbels support a balcony with heraldric shields on its stone rail. Gargoyles project from each corner. The last stage, the belfry, has tall round-arched windows, another set of gargoyles and a tiled hip roof.

Both wings are similar. They are narrower than the main building, with east and west facades decorated with an arcade of seven rounded arches. Each is slightly recessed, with a rectangular window. On the north wing's east facade, windows have been added to the previously blind arch portion to provide illumination for the second story. A simpler version of the main block cornice, with dentils and cyma molding at the arches' springline, give a capital-like appearance to the piers between the arches.

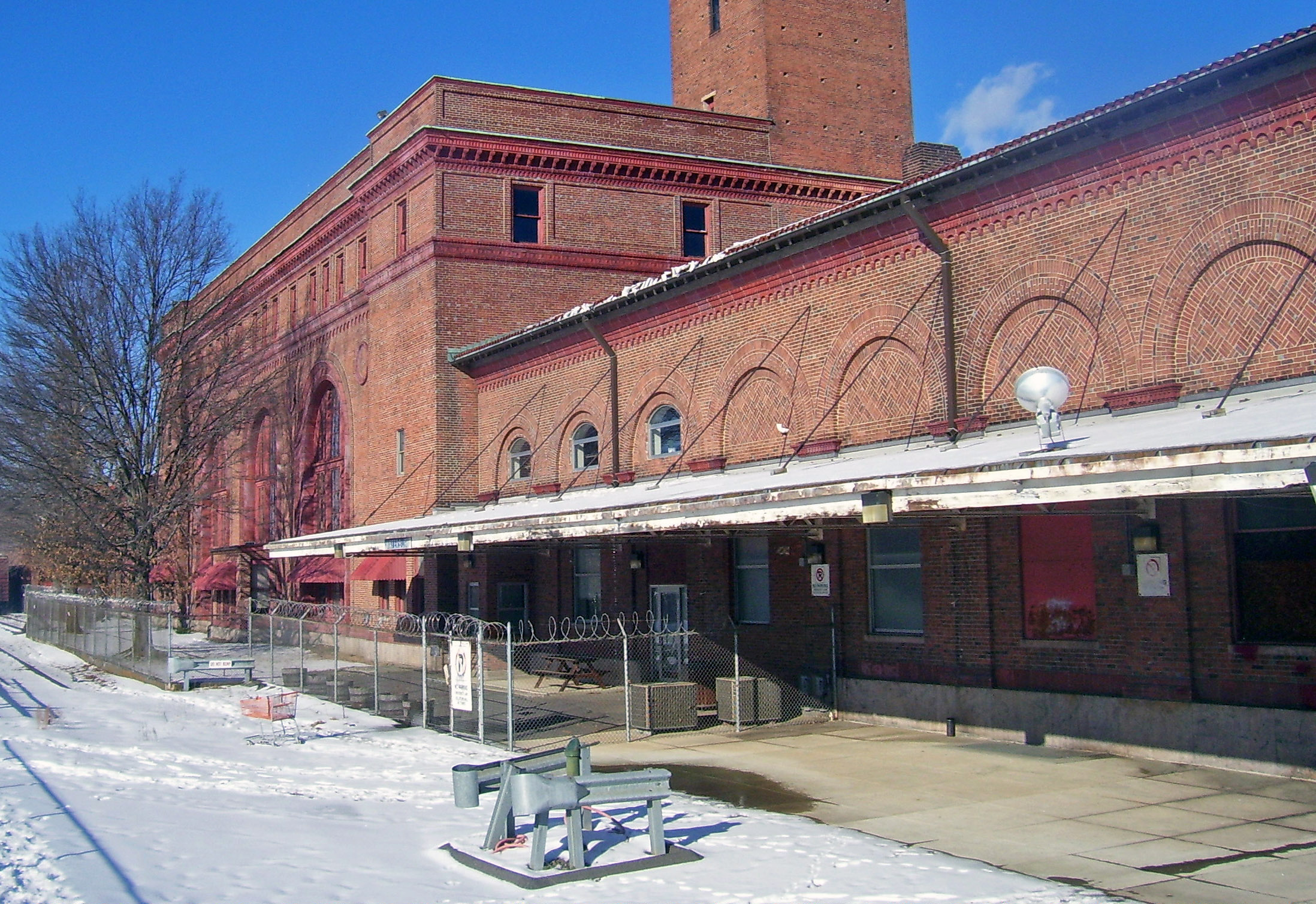
West (rear) elevation, 2009

A printing press was added to the north wing to support the newspaper. It is small and architecturally sympathetic, lessening the impact of its disruption of the building's overall symmetry. On the west of the south wing is a gabled remnant of the original platform shelter, supported by iron trusses on center posts and cables from the building. A shed roof on large iron brackets at the south end, formerly the baggage handling area, is now a default waiting area for Metro-North passengers in inclement weather.

=== Interior ===
Inside, the Republican-American has made changes to accommodate its purposes. Most prominently, the main block and north wing have had a second story added. In the offices on the new second floor some of the original vaulted ceiling, with large light-colored Guastavino tile in a herringbone pattern. These tiles are the same used at the Boston Public Library, Ellis Island, Grant's Tomb, the Biltmore Estate and other architecturally significant buildings. The window surrounds have similarly lavish decorations as the exterior, with two bands of terra cotta separated by dentils done in leaves and pearl molding. The buff brick walls likewise has a dentilled cornice with an engaged baluster-and-ring turning and a wide cyma molding done in a stylized floral pattern.

The south wing's interior, originally a restaurant, remained in use as a waiting room. Inside it has some original decor suggesting that purpose. They include brass ticket windows, a long Mission style wooden bench, iron radiator grill and marble baseboards and sills. Its vaulted ceiling and walls are done in plaster.

== History ==
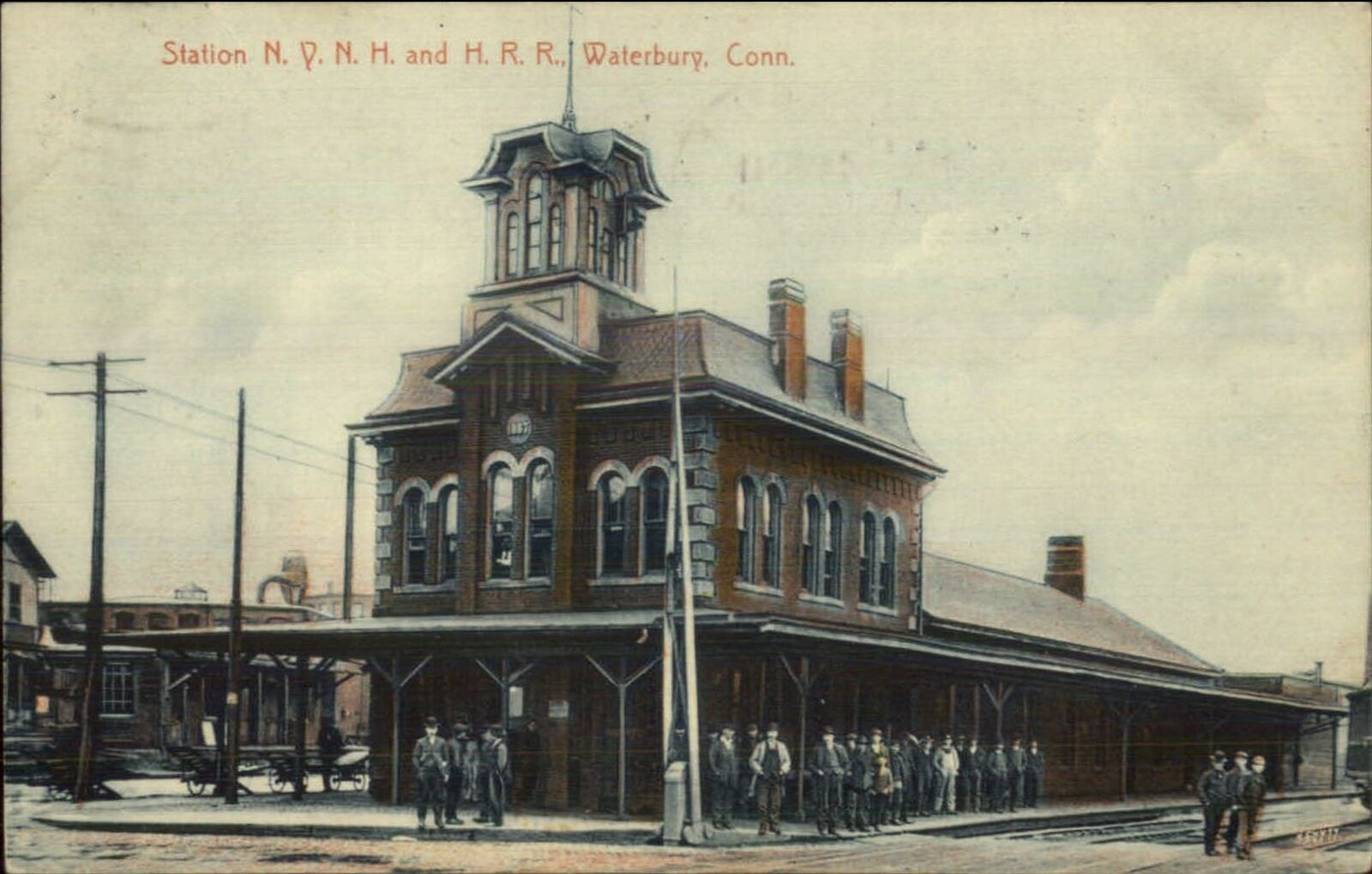
The previous station shortly before it was replaced

In the early years of the 20th century, the city of Waterbury, then prosperous and growing, began working with the New Haven and other railroads serving it on an urban renewal program to clear the way for a newer, larger station they all needed. Streets were straightened and buildings demolished in the neighborhood to the east. A small park replaced some of them. All grade crossings in the city were eliminated as part of the project.

McKim, Mead & White's design, extravagant in size and decoration, was meant to symbolize the city's prosperity and the railroads' importance to it. As many as 66 passenger trains served Waterbury at the peak of its traffic. The firm's design is different from its typically academic style in its efforts to unite the interior and exterior through similar materials and decorative themes, as well as the vaulted ceiling echoing the arches of the windows. The light reflecting off the warm interior colors through the large arched windows of the main facade made the building particularly welcoming at night.

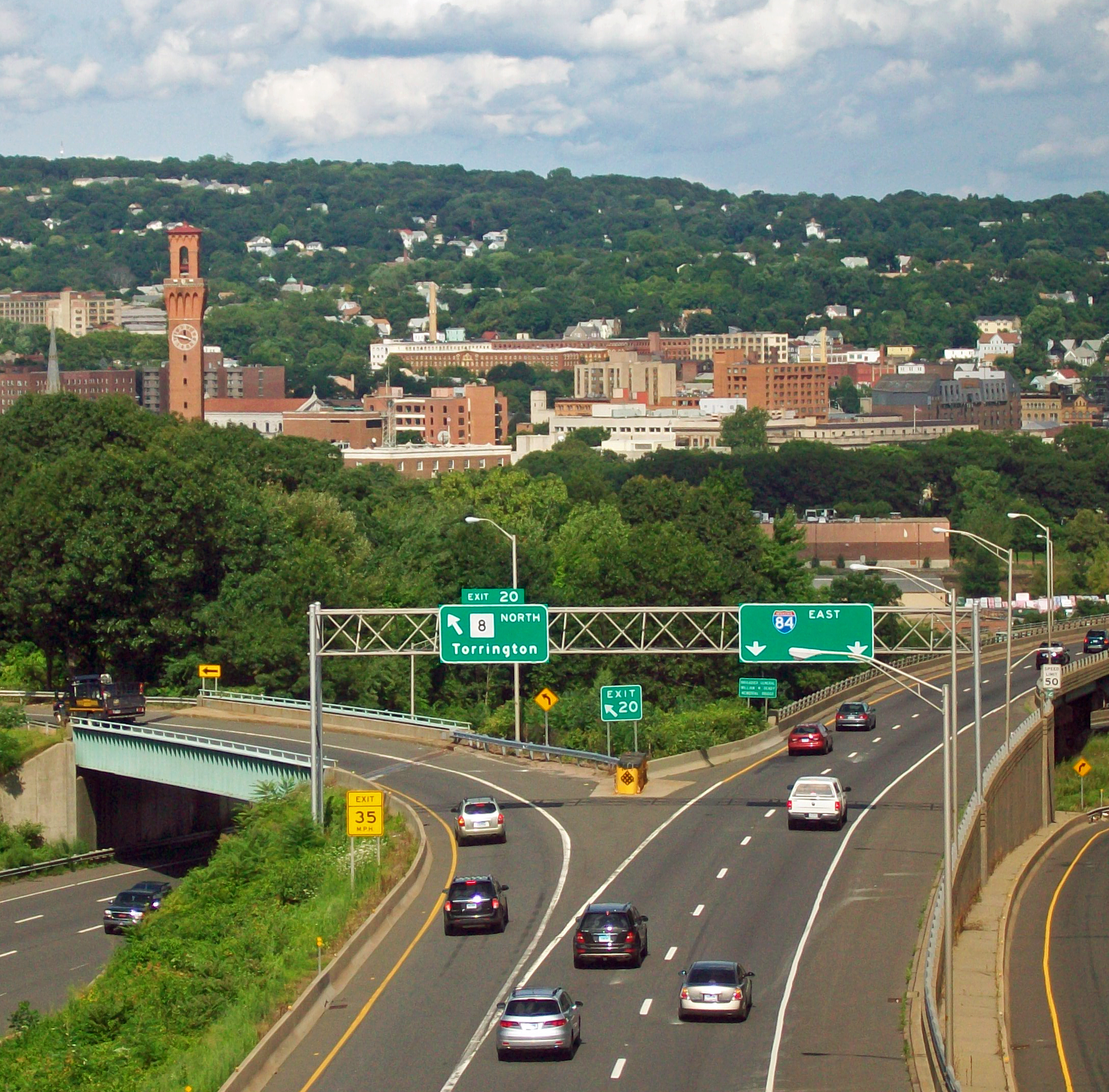
Clock tower dominating Waterbury skyline from I-84 as it approaches the city from the west

A year after construction began, the president of one of the railroads asked for a clock tower, given Waterbury's proximity to the Seth Thomas plant. McKim obliged with one based on the 14th-century Torre del Mangia in Siena, Italy. Architectural historian Carroll Meeks, in The Railroad Station: An Architectural History, believes that model was chosen as a deliberate rebuke to architectural amateurs such as the rail executive. The clock tower dominated the city's skyline then and continues to do so today, when most travelers arrive in the city via interstate highway instead of the train.

In summer 1909, the completed station was opened. As intended, it catalyzed development in the neighborhood. A few years later, the American Brass Company, representing another industry identified with the city and region, built new headquarters across Meadow Street from the station. Its architecture closely harmonized in size and material with the station.

The station continued to be used for intercity rail service to the city. The New Haven's Nutmeg and several unnamed trains operated east to Hartford and Boston until 1955. The company also operated trains northeast from New York City, through Waterbury, to New Britain and Hartford. The Naugatuck and other NH trains went north to Winsted and south toward New York City. Service declined and then stopped in the later decades of the 20th century. The last commercial service out the station was by the Penn Central railroad company.

In the 1970s one of the two newspapers that later became the Republican-American moved into the building, modifying it on the inside and out for that purpose. Republican-American Publisher William J. Pape purchased the building because of its status as a local landmark. At that time the south wing was still being used by Metro-North commuter rail passengers as a waiting area; since then that portion of the interior has been closed off and a new platform built. In 1973, Pape assigned company machinist John A. Correia to restore the original mechanisms of the station clock tower, which had been replaced by an electrical tower clock in 1963. The original mechanism is still functioning, on display in the lobby of the station.

As of 2024, the state plans to add a waiting room for Waterbury Branch passengers in the building, with construction to take place from 2025 to 2027.

== See also ==
- National Register of Historic Places listings in New Haven County, Connecticut
