= Giovanni Battista Dordoni =

Italian painter

Giovanni Battista Dordoni or Dordone (died 1599) was an Italian painter active in Castelleone.

== Biography ==
Dordoni painted the frescoes depicting Christ and the Apostles in the Sanctuary of the Misericordia in Castelleone. In 1588 he painted the clock face in the Torrazzo in Cremona. One of his pupils was the sculptor Francesco Gritto, called Mombello, also native of Castelleone.
