= Joseph Chamberlain Memorial Clock Tower =

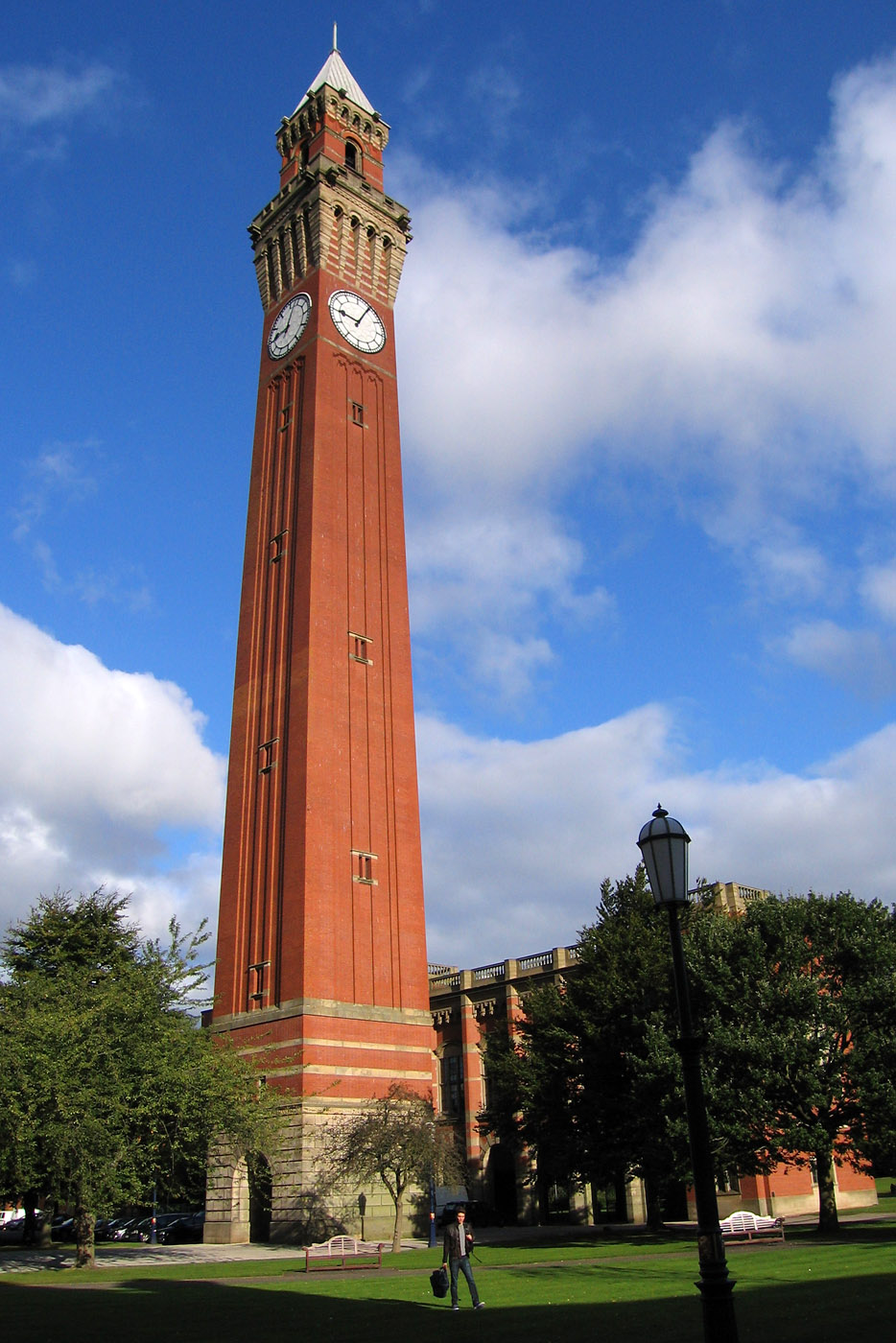
- Interactive map of the Joseph Chamberlain Memorial Clock Tower area

Record height
- Tallest in Birmingham from 1908 to 1965^{[I]}
- Preceded by: St Martin in the Bull Ring
- Surpassed by: BT Tower

General information
- Type: Campanile
- Location: University of Birmingham, Birmingham, England
- Coordinates: 52.4499°N 1.9307°W

Listed Building – Grade II*
- Official name: Chamberlain Tower, University of Birmingham
- Designated: 8 July 1982
- Reference no.: 1210306
- Construction started: 1907
- Completed: 1909
- Owner: University of Birmingham

Height
- Height: 325 feet (99 m)

Technical details
- Material: Red brick and Stancliff stone from Derbyshire

Design and construction
- Main contractor: Waring-White Building Company, London

The Joseph Chamberlain Memorial Clock Tower, or colloquially Old Joe, is a clock tower and campanile located in Chancellor's court at the University of Birmingham, in the suburb of Edgbaston. It is the tallest clock tower in the UK, although its actual height is the subject of some confusion. The university lists it variously as 110 metres (361 ft), 99 metres (325 ft), and 100 metres (328 ft) tall, the last of which is supported by other sources. In a lecture in 1945, Mr C. G. Burton, secretary of the university, stated that "the tower stands 329 ft [100 m] high, the clock dials measure 17 ft [5.2 m] in diameter, the length of the clock hands are 10 and 6 ft [3.0 and 1.8 m], and the bell weighs 5 long tons [5.1 tonnes]".

The tower was built to commemorate Joseph Chamberlain, the first Chancellor of the University (with the commemoration being carved into the stone at the tower's base), although one of the original suggested names for the clock tower was the "Poynting Tower", after one of the earliest professors at the university, Professor John Henry Poynting.

A prominent landmark in Birmingham, the grade II* listed tower can be seen for miles around the campus, and has become synonymous with the university itself.

== History ==
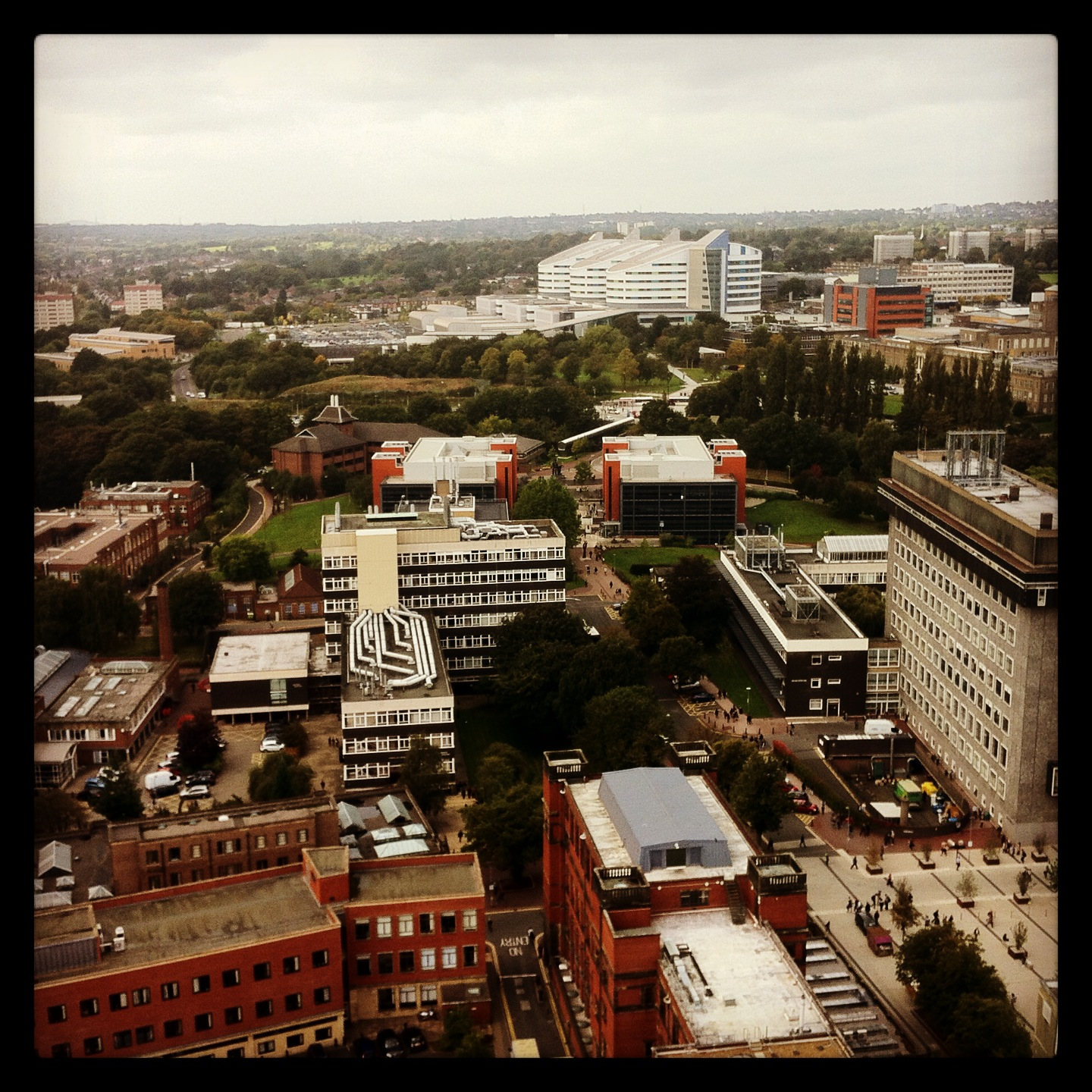
View from the tower, looking west, towards the Queen Elizabeth Hospital

Designed as part of the initial phase of the Edgbaston campus by architects Aston Webb and Ingress Bell, the tower was constructed between 1907 and 1909, and stood at the centre of a semicircle of matching red brick buildings. The tower is modelled on the Torre del Mangia in Siena. The original tower designs were amended due to Chamberlain's great admiration for the Italian city's campanile. On 1 October 1905, the Birmingham Post reported that Chamberlain had announced to the University Council an anonymous gift of £50,000 (the donor in fact was Sir Charles Holcroft). This anonymous gift was announced some two months later in the Birmingham Post as "to be intended for the erection of a tower in connection with the new buildings at Bournbrook at a cost estimated by the architects at £25,000. The tower, it was suggested, would be upwards of 300 ft (91.4 m) in height, and would not only form the main architectural feature of the University but would be useful in connection with the Physics Department and as a record tower. In 1940, Sir Mark Oliphant used the tower for radar experiments.

The tower remained the tallest structure in Birmingham until 1965, when construction on the 152 m (498.7 ft) tall BT Tower was completed in the Jewellery Quarter area of the city. However, Old Joe is still the tallest clock tower in the UK.

The asteroid 10515 Old Joe, discovered in 1989, is named in the clock tower's honour. There is a superstition that if students walk through the tower's archway when it chimes, they will fail their degree.

== Description ==
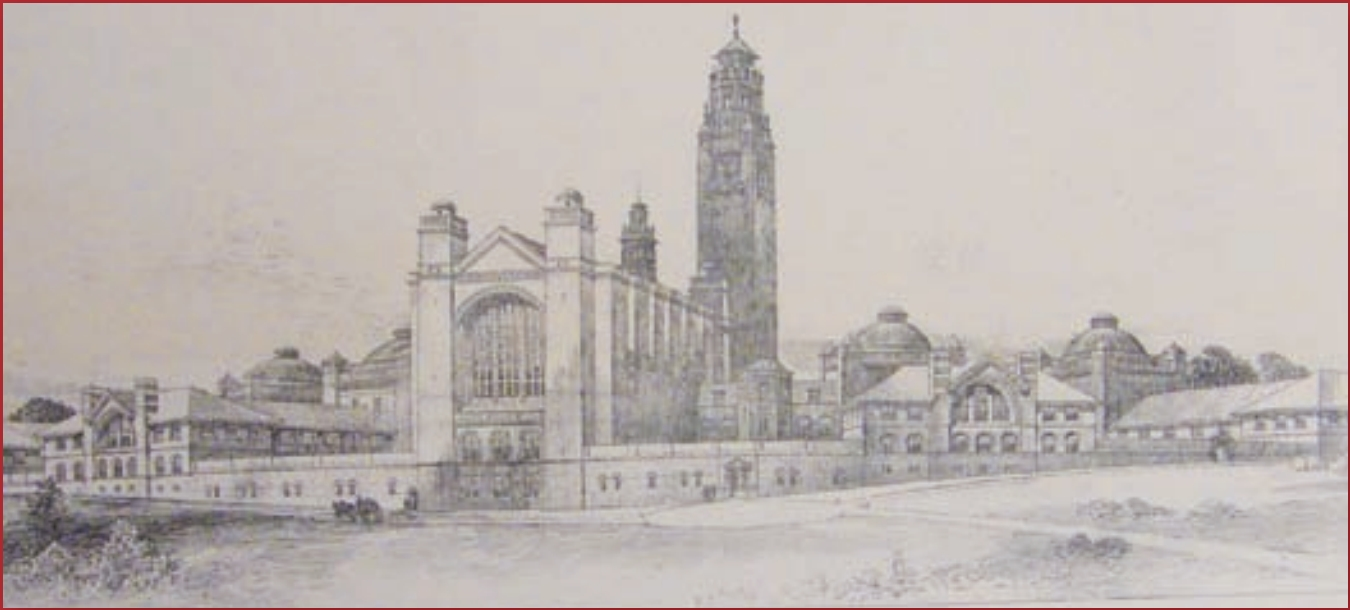
Original design for Old Joe as inspired by St. Mark's Campanile, Venice

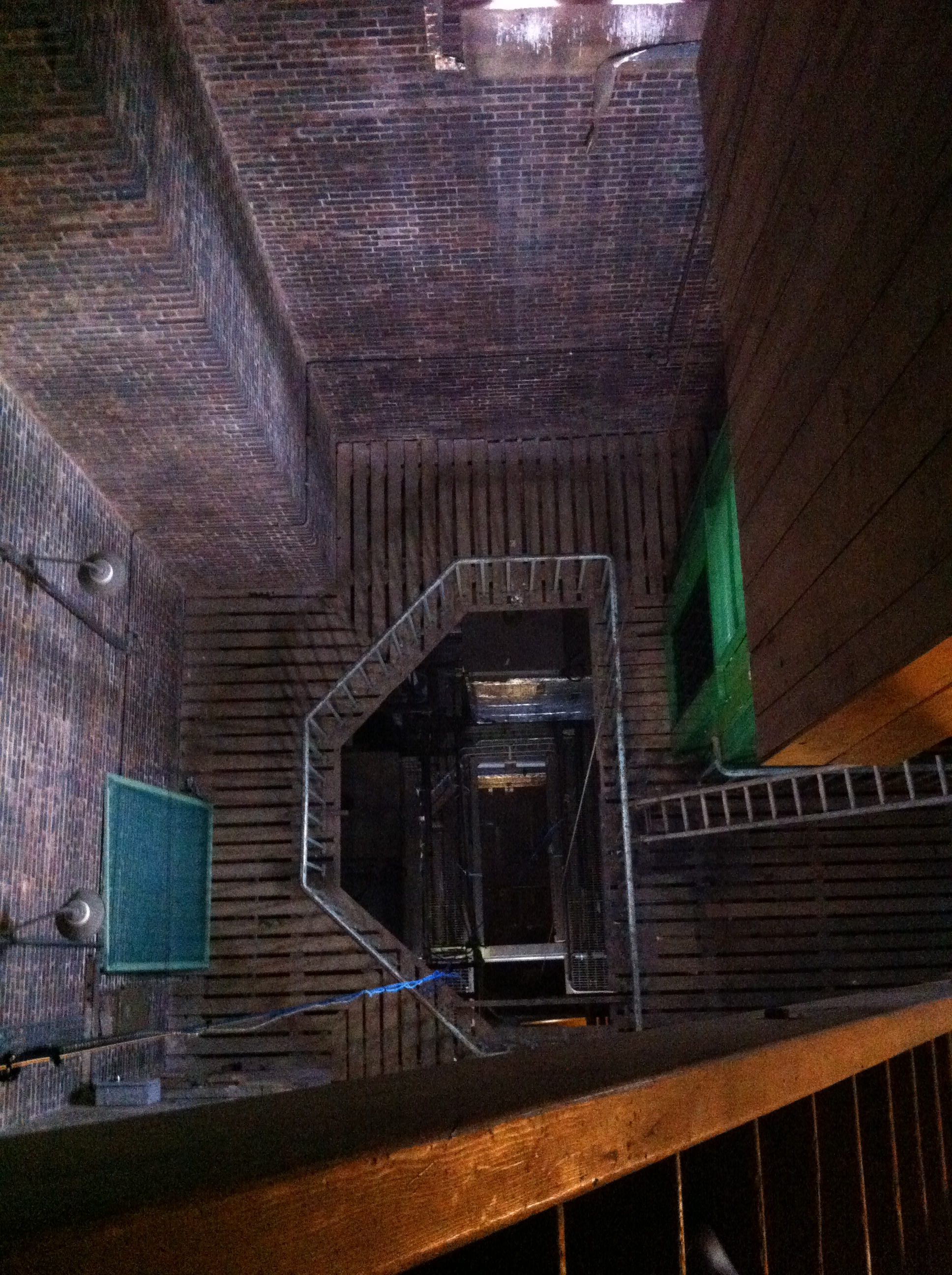
Interior view looking down from the 8th floor

The base is solid concrete, 50 ft (15.2 m) square by 10 ft (3.0 m) thick, with foundations that extend 328 ft (100 m) below ground to ensure stability. Joyce of Whitchurch built the clock, the face of which is 5.25 m (17.2 ft) across, the largest bell weighs 13,619 pounds (6,177.5 kg) with all the bells together weighing 20 long tons (20 tonnes); the minute hand is 4.1 m (13 ft 5 in) long, the hour hand is 2 ft (61 cm) across, the pendulum is 15 ft (4.6 m) long. The clock hands are made out of sheet copper. There are ten floors served by an electrical lift in the SW corner. The tower was built from the inside, without scaffolding, up to the level of the balcony. It is built of Red Accrington brick with Darley Dale dressings and tapers from 29 ft (8.8 m) square to 23 ft (7.0 m) below the balcony. Owing to its having been built from the inside it was not pointed and had to be pointed in 1914 and was subsequently repointed in 1957 and 1984–85. Its weight, solid brick corners linked by four courses of brick, resists the overturning wind forces.

The original design for Old Joe is thought to have been based upon St Mark's Campanile in Venice, the latter having served as the inspiration for Sather Tower at University of California, Berkeley. The final design is thought to have been inspired by Torre del Mangia which is of similar design but for the clock being placed towards the bottom of the tower.

David Lodge's novel Changing Places tells the story of exchange of professors between the universities of Rummidge and Euphoric State, Plotinus (thinly disguised fictional versions of Birmingham and Berkeley), which in the book both have replicas of the Leaning Tower of Pisa on campus.
