= Torrazzo of Cremona =

Bell tower of the Cathedral of Cremona, Lombardy, Italy

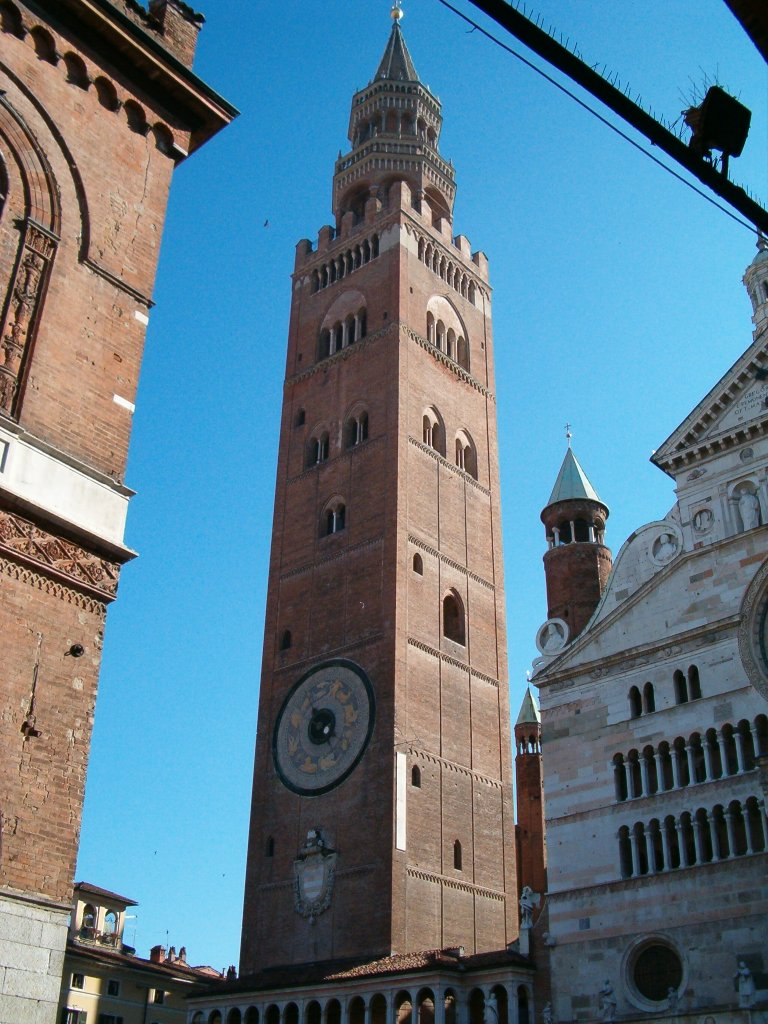

Religion
- Affiliation: Catholic Church
- Region: Lombardy

Location
- Location: Cremona
- Municipality: Comune di Cremona
- State: Italy
- Interactive map of Torrazzo of Cremona
- Coordinates: 45.133758°N 10.025159°E

Architecture
- Style: Romanesque and Gothic
- Groundbreaking: 1230
- Completed: 1309
- Height (max): 112,54 metres (369,2 ft)

Website
- https://museoverticale.it

The Torrazzo is the bell tower of the Cathedral of Cremona, Lombardy, in northern Italy.

The Torrazzo measures 112.54 metres (369 1/4 ft), and it is known as the third tallest brickwork bell tower in the world, the first being the tower of St. Martin's Church in Landshut, Bavaria, and the second at the Church of Our Lady in Bruges, Belgium. However, the Torrazzo (completed in 1309) is older than the Landshut tower (completed in 1500) and the Bruges tower (completed in 1465), and it is the oldest brick structure taller than 100 m that is still standing.

According to popular tradition, construction on the tower began in 754. In reality, it was built in four phases: a first dating back to the 1230s, up to the third dripstone, a second, between 1250 and 1267, up to the dripstone under the quadriphore, a third around 1284, and the completion of the marble spire in 1309.

Its height is announced by a plaque embedded in the wall at the base of the Torrazzo itself, stating 250 arms and 2 ounces, which in the ancient measuring system of the Lombard towns translates to approximately 111 metres.

Archaeological excavations made in the 1980s have discovered the presence of underlying structures which are supposed to be the remains of a more ancient churchyard (or a cemetery associated to it), or even previous Roman buildings.

== The Astronomical Clock ==
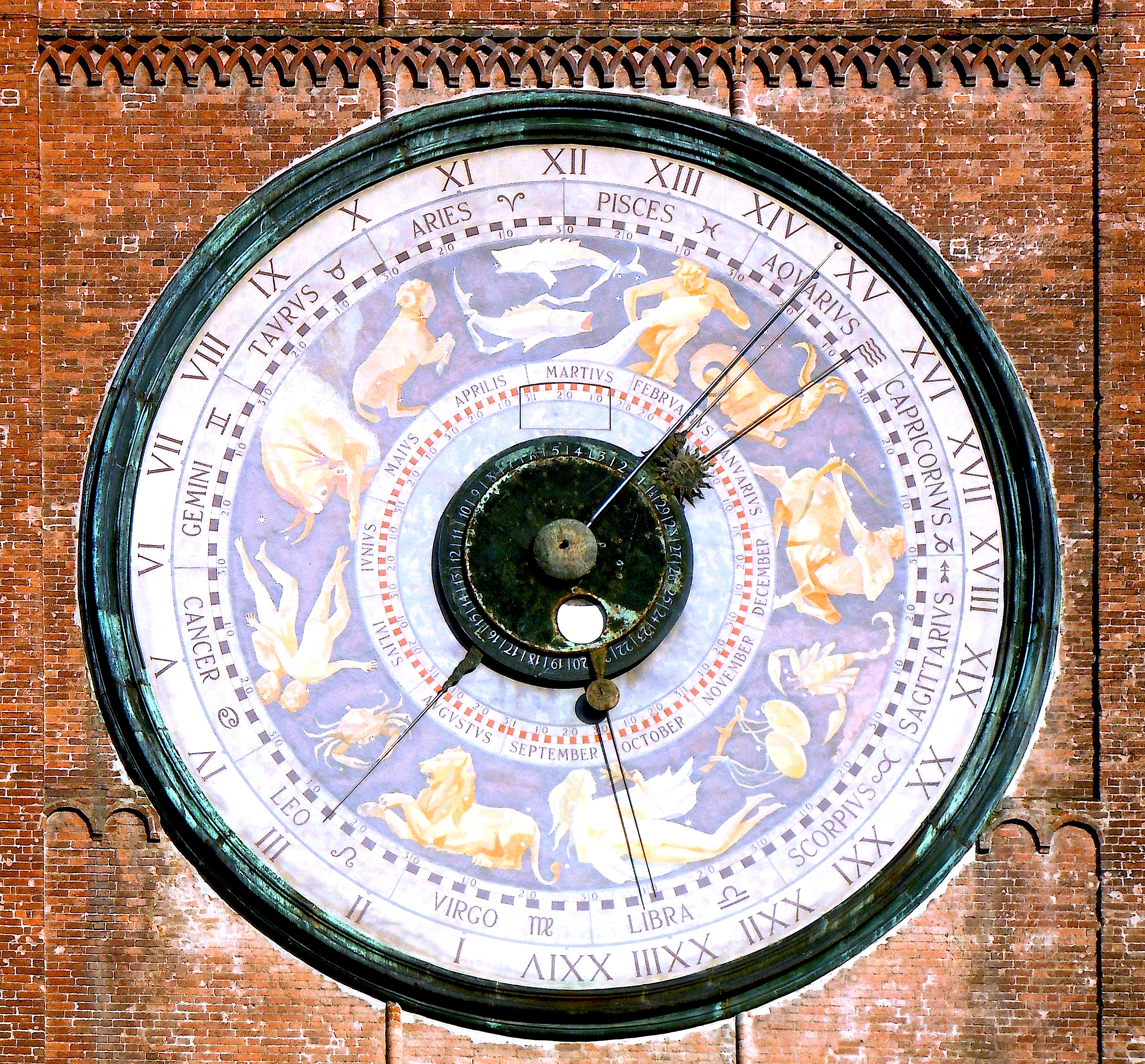
Astronomical clock.

At the fourth storey of the Torrazzo resides the largest astronomical clock in the world. The clock dial has a diameter of 8.20 metres (27 ft).

The mechanism was built by Francesco and Giovan Battista Divizioli (father and son) between 1583 and 1588. The exterior, originally painted by Paolo Scazzola in 1483 but later repainted many times, including by Giovanni Battista Dordoni, represents the sky with zodiac constellations and the Sun and Moon moving through them.

The clock hands are five (actually, they are four because one of them is a double), and they have the main function of representing a lot of astronomical phenomena, such as Lunar phases, solstices, equinoxes and eclipsis.

== The bells ==
The Torrazzo is formed by seven bells, all tuned in the scale of A major. There is also another bell, called the "Ringing Bell", used to strike the hour.

== See also ==
- List of tallest structures built before the 20th century

== Sources ==
- Galeati, G. (1928). Il Torrazzo di Cremona. Cremona.
- Saracino, M.T. (1978). Il Torrazzo ed il suo restauro. Cremona.
- Loffi, F. (1987). Il Torrazzo di Cremona. Cremona.
- Ghidotti, P. Il Torrazzo di Cremona. Archeologia e storia di un monumento medievale.
