= List of breweries in Pennsylvania =

This is a partial list of breweries in Pennsylvania. In 2017 there are 300 licensed craft breweries in Pennsylvania. One of these breweries is America's longest established, D.G. Yuengling & Son. Yuengling is also the largest craft brewery in the country based on volume of sales. Other nationally known brands that are made in Pennsylvania include Dock Street Brewing Co.'s Bohemian Pilsner, first brewed in 1986, Victory Brewing Company's Hop Devil and Weyerbacher's Merry Monks. Some of these breweries also feature a restaurant or snack bar at their breweries. Brewpubs in Pennsylvania do not distribute their products beyond the premises.

== Breweries ==
The breweries listed here distribute their products beyond their own premises, unless they are designated as brewpubs:

=== Southeastern Pennsylvania ===
- Animated Brewing Company, Coatesville
- Attic Brewing Company, Philadelphia
- Be Here Brewing Company, Avondale, founded in 2019
- Brewery ARS, Philadelphia
- Cartesian Brewing Company, Philadelphia
- Concordance Ferments, Hatboro, brewpub, founded in 2024
- Dock Street Brewing Company, Philadelphia, founded in 1985
- East Branch Brewing Company, Downingtown, Pennsylvania
- Human Robot Brewing Company, Philadelphia
- Iron Hill Brewery & Restaurant, multiple locations, brewpub, founded in 1996
- Lancaster Brewing Company, Lancaster, founded in 1995
- Love City Brewing Company, Philadelphia
- Neshaminy Creek Brewing Company, Croydon, founded in 2010
- Philadelphia Brewing Company, Philadelphia, founded in 2007
- Punch Buggy Brewing Company, Philadelphia, founded in 2020
- Reading Brewing Company, Reading (revived the former trademark of, but is otherwise unrelated to, the original Reading Brewing Company, which closed in 1976)
- Separatist Brewing Company, Philadelphia
- Sly Fox Brewing Company, Pottstown, brewpub
- Stoudt's Brewing Company, Adamstown, founded in 1987
- Tired Hands Brewing Company, Ardmore, brewpub
- Triple Bottom Brewing, Philadelphia, brewery, founded in 2019
- Triumph Brewing, New Hope, brewpub, founded in 2003
- Victory Brewing Company, Downingtown, brewpub, founded in 1996
- Weyerbacher Brewing Company, Easton, founded in 1995
- Wissahickon Brewing Company, Philadelphia, founded in 2017
- Yards Brewing Company, Philadelphia, founded in 1994

=== Central Pennsylvania ===
- Appalachian Brewing Company, Harrisburg, Gettysburg, Mechanicsburg, Collegeville, Lititz, formed in 1994
- Axemann Brewery, Bellefonte, founded in 2020
- Englewood Brewing, Hummelstown, founded in 2020
- Otto's Pub and Brewery, State College, founded in 2002
- Tröegs Brewing Company, Hershey, founded in 1996
- Yuengling (D. G. Yuengling & Son), Pottsville, established in 1829
- Floating Feathers Brewering Company, Mill Hall, founded in 2021.

=== Southwestern Pennsylvania ===
- The Church Brew Works, Pittsburgh, founded in 1996
- Cinderlands Beer Company, Pittsburgh, founded in 2017
- City Brewing Company, Latrobe; formerly Latrobe Brewing (the producers of Rolling Rock), now a contract brewer for national brands
- Duquesne Brewing Company, Pittsburgh, founded in 2011 (revived the former trademark of, but is otherwise unrelated to, the original Duquesne Brewing Company, which closed in 1972)
- East End Brewing Company, Pittsburgh, founded in 2003
- Fort Pitt Brewing Company, Pittsburgh, 1906–1957
- Hitchhiker Brewing Company, Pittsburgh, founded in 2014
- Iron City Brewing Company, Pittsburgh, founded in 1899 (formerly Pittsburgh Brewing Company)
- Jones Brewing Company
- Lolev Beer, Pittsburgh, founded in 2021
- Pennsylvania Brewing Company, Pittsburgh, formed in 1986

=== Northwestern Pennsylvania ===
- The Brewerie at Union Station, Erie, founded in 2006
- Straub Beer, St. Marys, founded in 1872
- Erie Brewing Company, Erie, founded in 1994
- Kohler Brewing, New Castle, PA

=== Northeastern Pennsylvania ===
- Lion Brewery, Inc., Wilkes-Barre, founded in 1909 (a.k.a. Gibbons Brewery 1943–1974)
- Barley Creek Brewing Company, Founded in 1995 – Tannersville PA

== Defunct breweries and brewpubs ==
- Joseph Potts Ale Brewery, founded 1774 in Philadelphia by Joseph Potts. Purchased 1786 by Henry Pepper, then George Pepper beginning in 1807, then David Pepper in 1836. Robert Smith purchased it in 1845 and the Robert Smith Ale Brewing Co remained open until closed by Prohibition in 1920.
- John F. Betz & Sons, Philadelphia, founded in 1775 as the Robert Hare & J. Warren Peter Brewery, closed in 1939
- Point Brewery, Fort Pitt, founded by James O'Hara in 1803 on the site of a smaller, pre-existing brewery that had been in existence since at least 1795; closed in 1860
- Mount Carbon Brewery, Pottsville, founded in 1845 as George Lauer, closed in 1976
- Fuhrmann & Schmidt Brewing Company, Shamokin, began operations in 1854 as the Eagle Run Brewery, bought by H. Ortlieb Brewing Company in 1966, ceased operations in spring 1976
- Christian Schmidt Brewing Company, Philadelphia, founded as Robert Coutrennay Brewery in 1859, the Christian Schmidt & Sons Brewing Company was sold in 1987 to G. Heileman Brewing Company of La Crosse, Wisconsin
- Duquesne Brewing Company, Pittsburgh (1899–1972)
- Latrobe Brewing Company, Latrobe, founded in 1893, closed in 2006; Rolling Rock is now brewed by Anheuser-Busch in Newark, New Jersey
- Independent Brewing Company of Pittsburgh, Pittsburgh, founded in 1905 as a conglomerate of fifteen breweries; dissolved in 1933

== See also ==
- Beer in the United States
- List of breweries in the United States
- List of microbreweries
