= Moravian Book Shop =

Bookstore in Pennsylvania, United States

Coordinates: 40.6194°N 75.3818°W

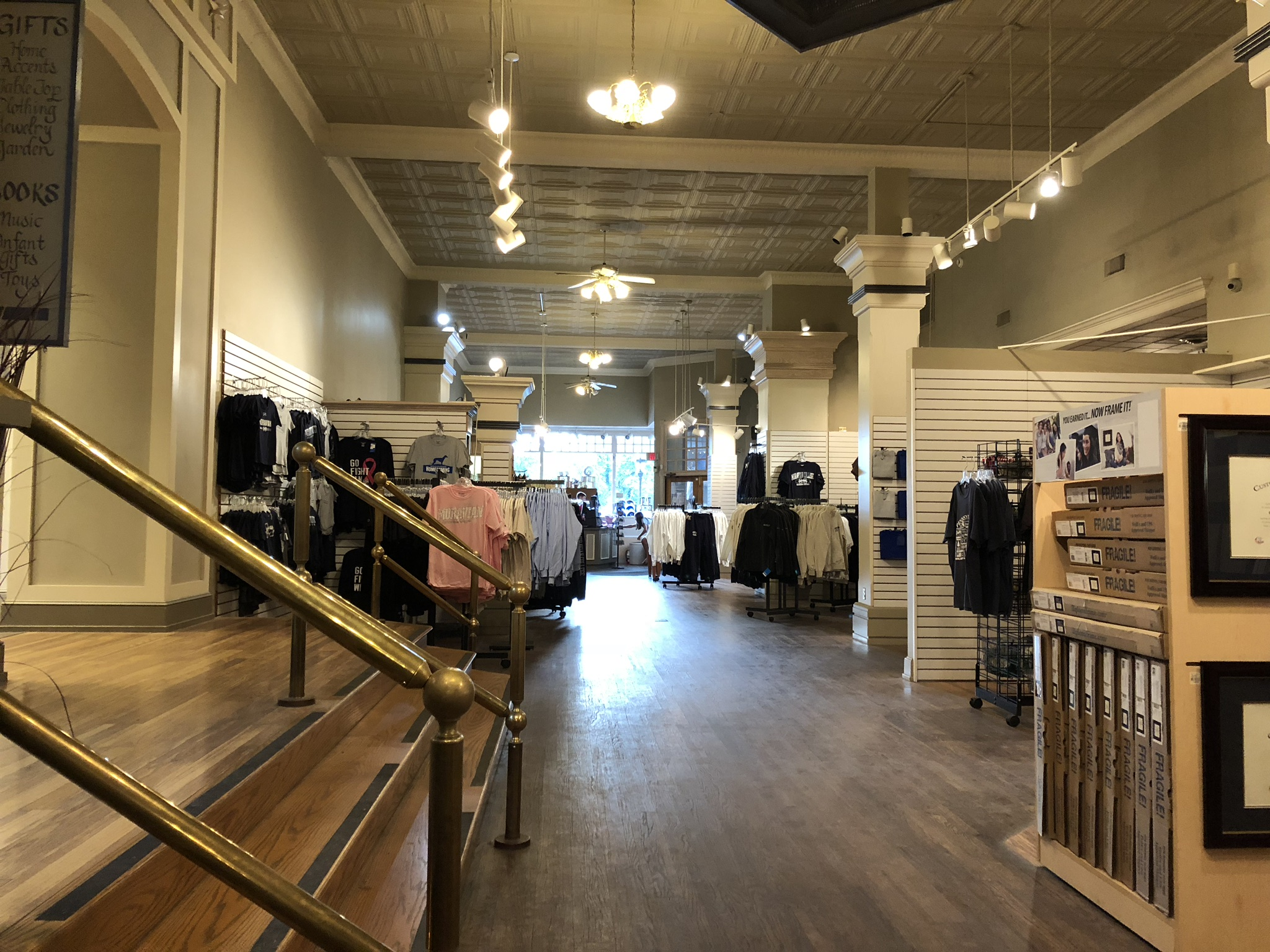
Interior of the Moravian Book Shop

Moravian Book Shop is a book store based in Bethlehem, Pennsylvania. It was founded in 1745 by the Moravian Church and lays claim to being the oldest continuously operating bookstore in the United States and the second-oldest in the world after Livraria Bertrand in Lisbon, Portugal, which opened in 1732.

As of June 2018, Moravian Book Shop is also home to the Moravian College student bookstore. In 2018, the Moravian Church Northern Province approached Moravian College, seeking to sell the store to entrust the legacy of the Book Shop to an owner within the "Moravian Family" and continue its focus on their 85 congregations. The bookstore is currently owned by Moravian College with day-to-day operations handled by Barnes & Noble College Booksellers.

== History ==
=== 18th century ===
In 1745, Bishop Augustus Spangenberg of the Moravian Church charged Samuel Powell, an innkeeper on the South Side of Bethlehem, to open and operate a bookstore. In its early years, the store served to cater to the needs of the church, importing and selling devotional and liturgical materials for use by churchgoers, missionaries, and students.

=== 19th century ===
Over the 19th century, the store was moved to several locations, including, for a time, to Philadelphia, where it existed as both a seller and printer of books.

In 1871, the store was moved to a building near the Central Moravian Church on Main Street in Bethlehem. The store occupies the same space to this day, though it has expanded several times in the intervening 140 years and now fills 14,000 square feet (1,300 m^{2}) in four buildings. The bookstore is now owned by the Ministers' Pension Fund of the Northern Province of the Moravian Church and is overseen by a board of directors which is appointed by the church.

=== 20th and 21st centuries ===
In 2015, the store opened its first satellite location in Center City Allentown as part of the Two City Center complex. The location was closed in May 2017 to refocus on the Bethlehem location and remaining stock was moved there.

From 2015 to 2018 the bookstore became home to a tasting room for the Colony Meadery, an Allentown-based Meadery and a dog treat manufacturer named Bone Appetit. In April 2018, nearby Moravian College announced the acquisition of the shop. The College announced they would evaluate all properties to explore collaboration with local vendors, but that the Colony Meadey and Bone Appetit would not "fit into those plans." In the end, no suitable vendors were found and the historic bookstore became the student bookstore for the college, being run by Barnes & Noble College Booksellers. Employee Leo Atkinson created a petition to the college to let the then-current staff run the store independently without the Barnes & Noble partnership, but was unsuccessful in this goal.

== Features ==
Moravian Book Shop features a book section that includes indie best sellers, trade books, and select books highlighting the history of Moravian Church, Bethlehem, Pennsylvania, Bethlehem Steel, the Lehigh Valley, and Pennsylvania. In addition, the Moravian Book Shop sells and buys back student textbooks. The Book Shop also stocks Moravian College apparel and gift items, reference books, stationery and art supplies, greeting cards, candy, and health and beauty aids. In addition, the inventory also includes traditional Moravian- and Bethlehem-themed gifts and College faculty- and alumni-authored books. The store also hosts weekly reading and discussion groups and monthly events with authors.

== Moravian Stars ==
The store specializes in the sale of hundreds of Moravian Stars, also called Advent Stars, which were first produced in 19th-century Germany. The 26-point stars are produced in many styles and fabricated in various materials. These have continued to be produced with the change of ownership.
