= Dock Street Brewing Company =

Philadelphia Brewery

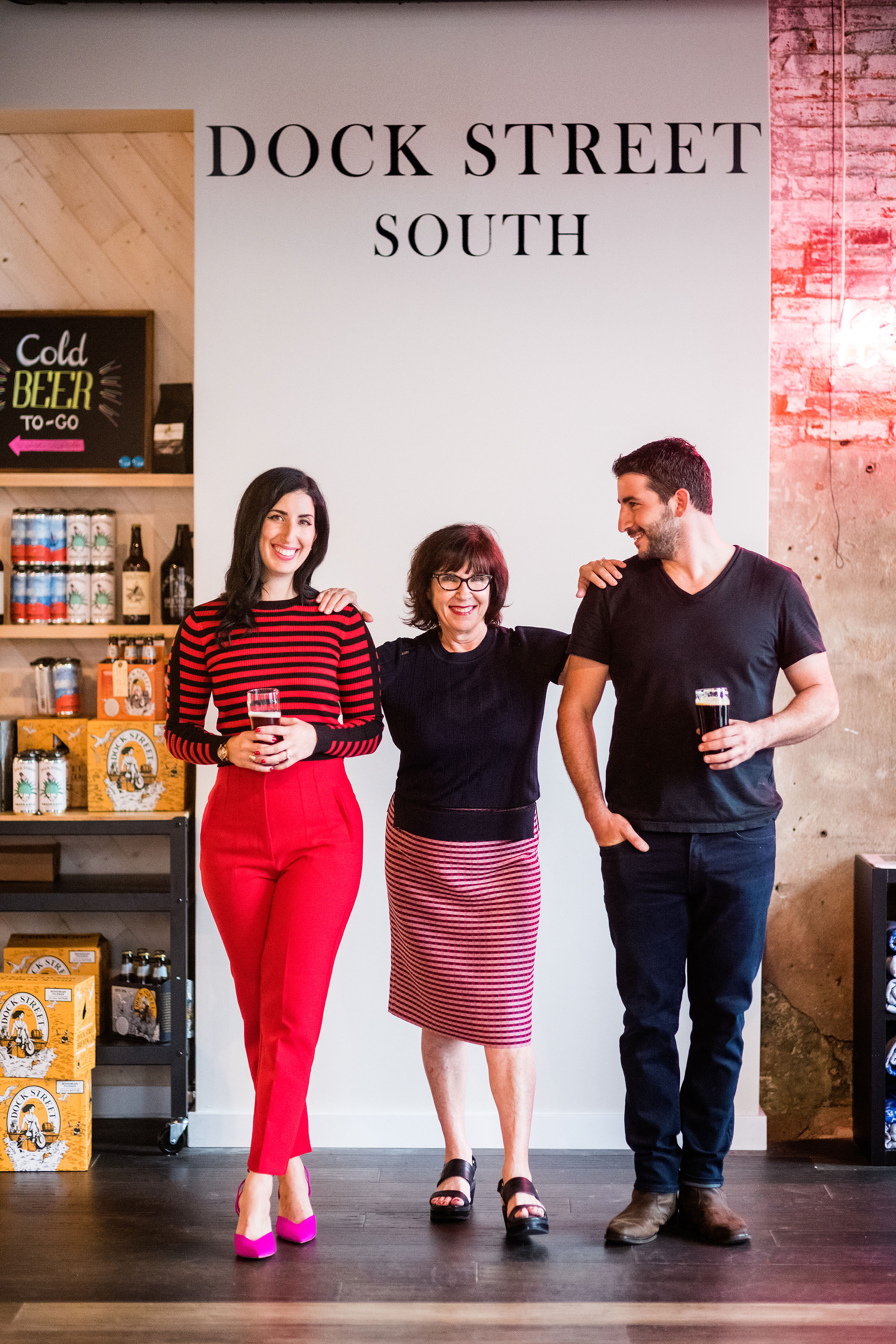
- Location: Philadelphia, PA, United States
- Key people: Rosemarie Certo, Mark Russell, Renata Certo-Ware, Sasha Certo-Ware, Jeffrey Ware
- Annual production volume: 2,500 US beer barrels (2,900 hL) in 2020
- Other products: Dock Street Spirits, Vicio Mezcal
- Distribution: Pennsylvania, New York
- Website: www.dockstreetbeer.com

Active beers
Name	Type
Dock Street Rye IPA	American Style IPA
Dock Street Bohemian Pilsner	Pilsner
Dock Street King Juice	American Style Double IPA
Dock Street Futuro	Italian Pilsner

Seasonal beers
Dock Street Summer Haze, Dock Street Winter Haze, Dock Street Barracuda, Dock Street Man Full of Trouble
Name	Type

Dock Street Brewing Company is an independent craft brewing company with a 10,500 square foot brewpub and production brewery in the Point Breeze neighborhood of Philadelphia, PA, and a 1,000 square foot tasting room in the Fishtown neighborhood of Philadelphia. Established in 1985, it claims to be the first craft brewing company based in the Philadelphia area following Prohibition and one of the first in the country. The name Dock Street was chosen in honor of the seaport district of the same name in Philadelphia, which was the largest producer of beer in the then newly-formed United States in the late 1700s.

== History ==
Dock Street was created in 1985 as a bottled beer operation based in Bala Cynwyd, Pennsylvania. It was founded by photographer Rosemarie Certo and her husband Jeffrey Ware, a Philadelphia restaurateur.

In 1989, the pair opened a brewpub in the Logan Square neighborhood of Center City, Philadelphia's central business district. By 1996, the company was producing more than 25,000 barrels of beer and distributing to 24 states, making it the 26th largest microbrewery in the U.S.

Certo and Ware sold the company in 1998 to Poor Henry's Brewery & Restaurant, operated by a descendant of the family behind the Henry F. Ortlieb Brewing Company, also of Philadelphia. In 2000, Poor Henry's ceased operations.

Certo repurchased the brand and bottling operation in 2002. In 2007, the brewery reopened as a pizza-centric brewpub in the former Firehouse Farmers Market in the Cedar Park neighborhood in West Philadelphia. The facility featured a 10-barrel brewing system, four fermenters, and six lagering tanks, and produced about 1,000 barrels per year.

Certo and Ware's daughter, Renata Vesey (Certo-Ware), a graduate of Boston University, and son, Sasha Certo-Ware, a graduate of Franklin & Marshall College, hold leadership roles in the company.

In January 2017, Mark Russell, a graduate from Temple University, assumed the position of Head Brewer.

In April 2017, Dock Street Brewing Company expanded with Dock Street Cannery + Lounge, a mixed-use space with a canning line, two fermenters, and a tasting bar with craft cocktails. With the expansion and the addition of the new fermentation tanks, Dock Street's capacity increased by 225%. In October 2019, Dock Street announced that all beers on tap at this location would be experimental, one-off batches under Dock Street West Lead Brewer, Edwin Lopez. In 2017, Philadelphia Magazine awarded Dock Street Cannery "Best New Bar" and in 2019 the Cannery won "Best Intellectual Drunk Fun” for their on-going prose reading series.

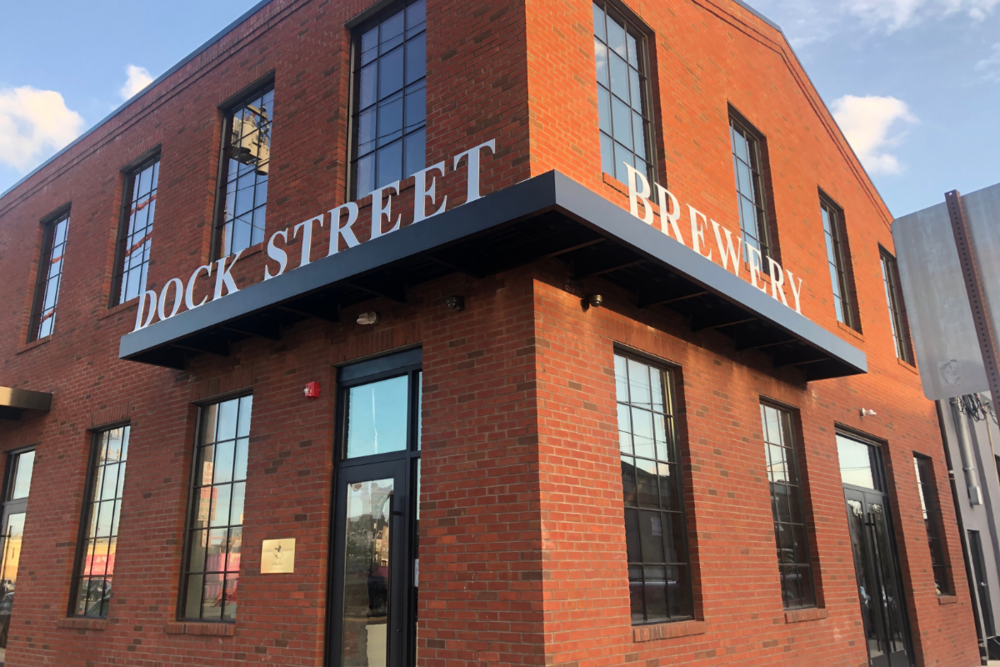
Dock Street South, a 10,500 square foot production brewery and brewpub opened in 2019

In August 2019, Dock Street Brewing Company expanded again with Dock Street South, a 10,500 square foot production brewery and brewpub on Washington Avenue in Point Breeze, Philadelphia, with Mark Russell as Head Brewer. Canning operations were moved to this location as well. Production capacity at this location is 4,500 barrels per year.

Dock Street Cannery closed in 2020, and in June 2022, Dock Street announced the closure of Dock Street West after 15 years in the firehouse. At the same time, Dock Street President and Owner Rosemarie Certo announced the brewing company would be opening a new location in Philadelphia's Fishtown neighborhood, which opened its doors in April 2023.

In 2023, Dock Street released Dock Street Wedding Beer, one of the only packaged beers brewed specifically for weddings, and the first beer brewed with symbolic ingredients and symbolic label art.

== Awards and honors ==
Great American Beer Festival

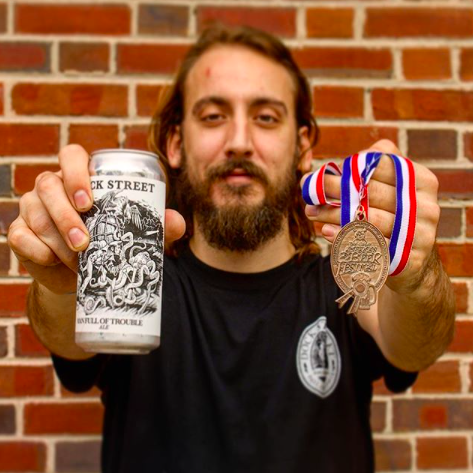
Mark Russell Dock Street Brewer and GABF medal

2021 - Bronze Medal for Dock Street Man Full of Trouble Ale (Brown Porter)

2017 - Bronze Medal for Dock Street Man Full of Trouble Ale (Brown Porter)
2012 - Silver Medal for Dock Street La Biere des Amis (Saison)
2012 - Bronze Medal for Dock Street ABT 12 (Belgian-style Abbey Ale)
1992 - Silver Medal for Dock Street Cream Ale
Bronze Medal for Dock Street Amber Beer

World Beer Cup

2012 - Bronze Medal for Prisoner of Hell (Belgian Strong Pale Ale)

Pennsylvania Farm Show

2024 - Second Place: Dock Street Bindlestiff (BELGIAN ALES)

2024 - Third Place: Dock Street Golden IPA (AMERICAN IPAS)

2023 - First Place: Dock Street King Juice (IPAS > 7.5%)

2023 - Second Place: Dock Street Man Full of Trouble Porter (PORTERS)

2023 - Second Place: Dock Street Rye IPA (SPECIALTY IPAS)

2022 - First Place: Dock Street Man Full of Trouble Porter (PORTERS - American or English Styles)

2022 - First Place: Dock Street Rye IPA (SPECIALTY IPA)

2022 - First Place: Dock Street King Juice (IPA >7.5% ABV)

2022 - First Place: Dock Street Winter Haze (PALE ALES)

2021 - First Place: Dock Street Bean 2 Bean Espresso Stout (STOUTS - American or English Styles)

2020 - First Place: Dock Street Man Full of Trouble Porter (PORTERS - American or English Styles)

2020 - Second Place Dock Street Winter Haze (PALE ALES)

2020 - Second Place: Dock Street Wild King (MIXED FERMENTATION SOUR)

New York International Beer Competition

2021 - Silver Medal Winner - Dock Street Man Full of Trouble Porter

The company has also been awarded multiple International Gold Medals for its Amber Beer and Royal Bohemian Pilsner. Dock Street's Rye IPA is currently listed on Beer Advocate's list of Top Rated Rye Beers in the World at #15.

Several of Dock Street's beers were included in beer critic Michael Jackson (writer)'s books, including the 1988 book New World Guide to Beer and the 1998 book Ultimate Beer. The original brewpub was also mentioned in Michael Jackson's Beer Companion in 1993. Dock Street Bohemian Pilsner was the only Pennsylvania beer included in Jackson's 1988 book New World Guide To Beer, and was among just a handful of Pennsylvania lagers in the Pilsner category a decade later in Jackson's Ultimate Beer, published in 1998. Dock Street's Illuminator Doppelbock and Dock Street Milk Stout were reviewed in his 2000 book Great Beer Guide.

Dock Street Brewery West was named one Philly's Best Pizza Places in 2011 by Philadelphia (magazine) as voted for 'The Best Toppings.'

In 2015, Dock Street was prominently featured as part of the exhibit "Hucksters: The Tumult of Dock Street" at Philadelphia's Independence Seaport Museum in the museum's Community Gallery exhibit space. The exhibit was curated by documentarian and author Erich Weiss.

== Products ==
Dock Street currently offers several year-round beers, two bottled beers, several recurring seasonal beers, and many one-off varieties.

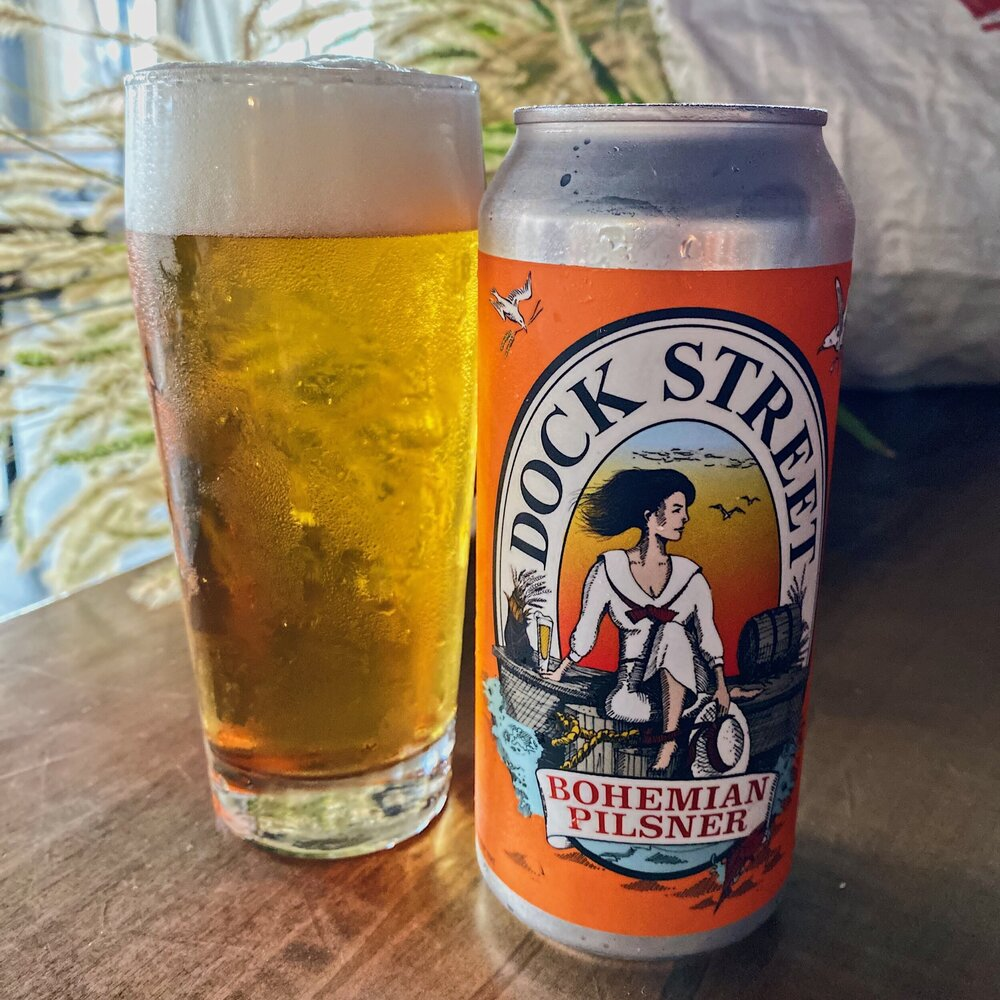
Dock street Bohemian Pilsner, an original brew first created in 1986 and sold in 12oz bottles is available today in 16oz cans

Year-round beers

- Dock Street Bohemian Pilsner
- Dock Street Golden IPA
- Dock Street Wedding Beer

Popular Seasonal and occasional beers

- Dock Street Man Full of Trouble
- Dock Street King Juice
- Dock Street Amber Ale
- Dock Street Prince Myshkin Russian Imperial Stout
- Dock Street Winter Haze
- Dock Street Summer Haze
- Dock Street Barracuda
- Dock Street Bubbly Wit

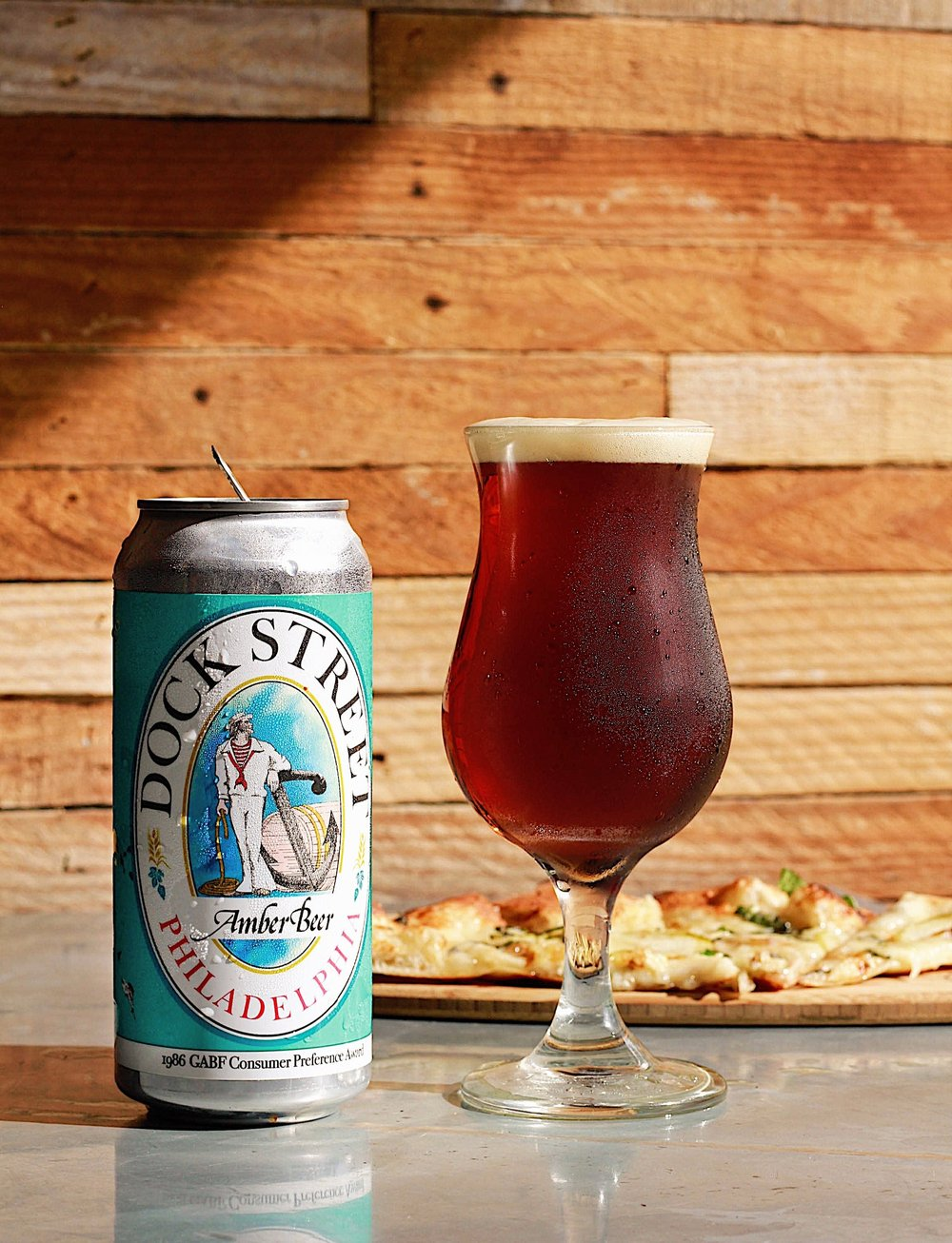
Dock Street Summer in Berlin

- Dock Street Abbey Single
- Dock Street Abbey Double
- Dock Street ABT 8 (Belgian-style Abbey Dubbel)
- Dock Street ABT 10 (Belgian-style Abbey Tripel)
- Dock Street ABT 12 (Belgian-style Abbey Quadrupel)
- Dock Street Amarillo IPA
- Dock Street Ambitchous Blonde (Blonde Ale)
- Dock Street Aurora Pale Ale
- Dock Street Baltic Porter
- Dock Street Baltic Maple Porter
- Dock Street Barrel-Aged Barley Wine (Barleywine)
- Dock Street Belgian Black IPA
- Dock Street Born Again Tripel
- Dock Street Bubbly Wit
- Dock Street Chamomileon
- Dock Street Chupar un Limon
- Dock Street Cowboy Saison
- Dock Street Cream Ale
- Dock Street Cuckoo's Nest Red
- Dock Street Dark Hoppy Jawn
- Dock Street Devil's Double IPA
- Dock Street Dock Street Beer Ain't Nothin' To Funk With
- Dock Street Docktoberfest
- Dock Street Dude de Garde (Biere de Garde)
- Dock Street Gail's Ale (Belgian-style Ale)
- Dock Street Helles
- Dock Street Hop Angel (Schwarzbier/American IPA)
- Dock Street Illuminator (Doppelbock)
- Dock Street Justin's Moustache (Helles)
- Dock Street Kolsch
- Dock Street No Exit Double IPA
- Dock Street OMG Pale Ale
- Dock Street Pimp My Rye
- Dock Street Prisoner of Hell (Belgian-style Strong Ale)
- Dock Street Royal Bohemian Pilsner
- Dock Street Saison Du Potts (Saison)
- Dock Street Sexual Chocolate (Imperial Stout
- Dock Street Sexy Beast (Chocolate Stout)
- Dock Street Sudan Grass (gluten-free ale made from sorghum)
- Dock Street Summer in Berlin
- Dock Street Teuton Porter
- Dock Street The Great Pumpkin
- Dock Street Trappist IPA
- Dock Street Walker
- West of Center (American Pale Ale)
- Winter Warmer

== Experimental Beers ==
In 2014, Dock Street Brewery released Dock Street Walker, a beer brewed with roasted goat brains in honor of the AMC television show The Walking Dead, a favorite of then-Head Brewer Justin Low and current Assistant Brewer Sasha Certo-Ware.

In 2015, then-Head Brewer Vince Desrosiers, along with Assistant Brewers Sasha Certo-Ware and Mark Russell, devised Dock Street Beer Ain't Nothin' To Funk With in homage to the hip-hop group Wu Tang Clan. The barrel was fitted with a custom speaker set, build by Certo-Ware, that played the music of Wu Tang Clan on repeat 24/7 for six months. The finished product was served, alongside a control, labeled simply "The Control," to determine whether the music affected the flavor of the beer by agitating the yeast. Bottles of D.S.B.A.N.T.F.W. sold out in under an hour at the brewery and online sales crashed the website. The release party for the beer was attended by Wu Tang Clan member Inspectah Deck.

In 2020, Dock Street partnered with Exyn Technologies on the World's First Drone-Assisted beer, Dock Street Swarm Intelligence, a Pale Ale brewed with local orange blossom honey, repeatedly hopped with small bursts of Ekuanot and Chinook throughout the boil, and dry hopped with Ekuanot, Mosaic, and Chinook. The can label art for Dock Street Swarm Intelligence is a multispectral photo of the brewery at Dock Street South, shot by "Exyn A3R," one of Exyn's drones.

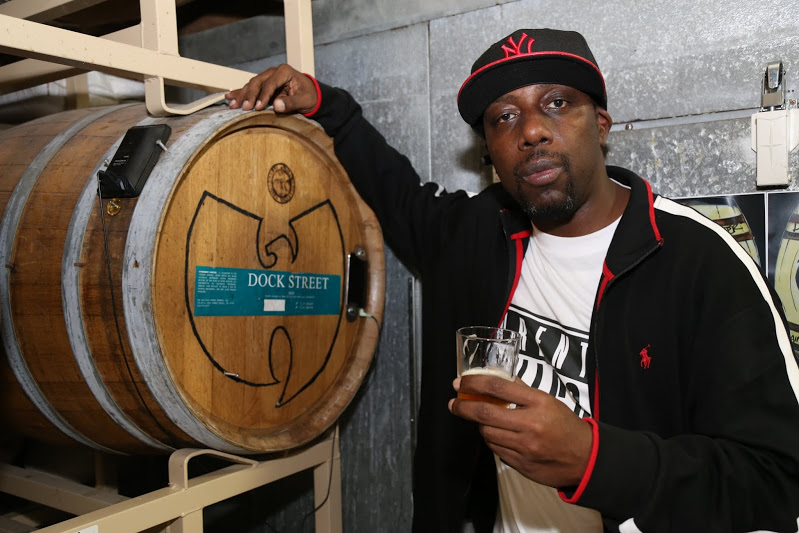
Inspektah Deck at Dock Street Brewery for the release of Dock Street Beer Ain't Nothing to Funk With

== Partnerships ==
Dock Street has been a longtime partner and sponsor of the Philadelphia Film Festival.

In January 2012, the company partnered with the Four Seasons Hotel Philadelphia, its former neighbor, to jointly brew four limited-quantity, seasonal beers for sale in the hotel's Swann Lounge: The Truffled Old Ale, Caliente Golden Ale, Cherry Verbena Saison, and Spanish Fly. In April 2013, the companies renewed their partnership for a second year; O.P. Yum and Crackle and Squeeze are the first two varieties.

In 2014, former brewer Justin Low traveled to Belgium to brew with Anne-Catherine Dilewyns of Brouwerij Dilewyns. The beer they co-brewed, an 8.5% ABV Belgian Ale named the Philly Tripel, was the official brew of Philly Beer Week.

In 2015, Dock Street brewed a batch of Red Owl Ale for the Hotel Monaco, a Philadelphia hotel under the Kimpton Hotels & Restaurants umbrella.

Also in 2015, Dock Street collaborated on the Little Chicken Pale Ale with Philadelphia-based band Flightschool.

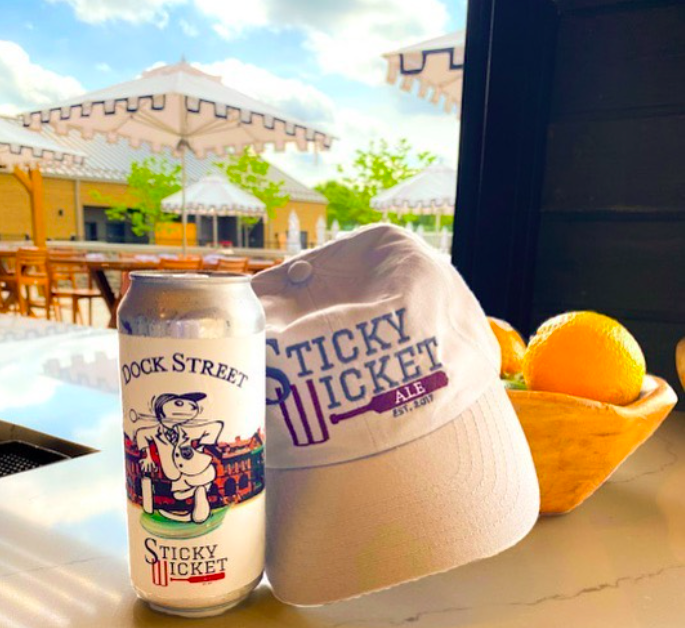
Dock Street Sticky Wicket, brewed exclusively for Merion Cricket Club, a historic private club in Haverford, PA.

In 2016, Dock Street began a collaborative beer with Chill Moody, nicethings IPA, and released the beer in 16oz cans and on draft several times. The beer sold out quickly from the brewpub thanks to fans of Chill Moody and Dock Street coming to buy cases at a time, and limited amounts were allocated to select bars and restaurants in Philadelphia as well.

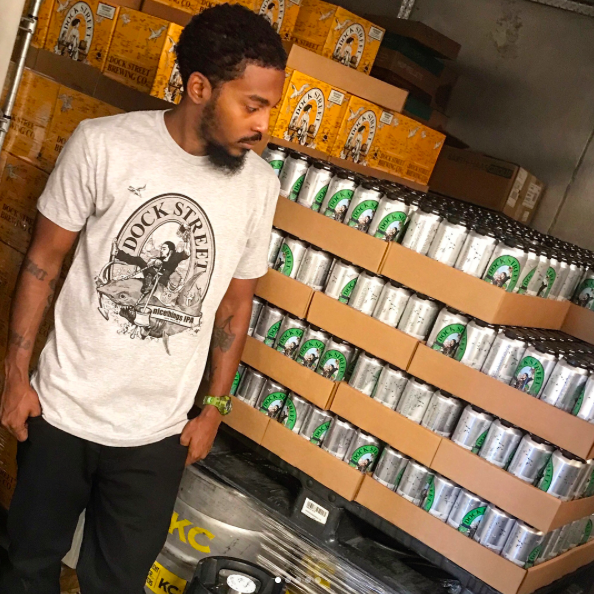
West Philadelphia hip-hop artist Chill Moody next to a batch of Dock Street nicethings IPA, a collaboration between the brewery and Chill Moody.

Also in 2016, Dock Street partnered with DiBruno Brothers on a Truffled Honey Saison in 2016.

In 2018, Dock Street collaborated with Boston-based brewing company Down the Road on a brew named "Down the Street" that featured artwork by Philadelphia artist Alexis Anne Grant. The label had many easter eggs that nodded to each city and the significance of the collaboration, including an eagle in honor of the Philadelphia Eagles, an axolotl, the mascot of Dock Street Brewing Co.'s sister spirits company, Dock Street Spirit's Vicio Mezcal, and a key, the symbol of Janus, the Roman god of beginnings and doorways. The beer was brewed with green tea and honey, a nod to the Boston Tea Party and PA's farming + honey harvesting heritage.

In 2019, Dock Street partnered with ceramic artist Brian Giniewski on a beer named Dock Street Guava Lava, which featured a can label that mirrored Ginieski's trademark "drippy" glaze style.

Around 2019, Dock Street began brewing and canning a custom beer for the prestigious and historic Merion Cricket Club, a private club in Haverford, PA. The beer continues to be produced today and is available exclusively at Merion Cricket Club.

Partnership Beers

- Dock Street Satellite Espresso Stout (Stout with espresso beans, Satellite Cafe in Cedar Park, Philadelphia)
- Dock Street Johnny Berliner (developed in conjunction with Johnny Brenda's in Fishtown, Philadelphia)
- Dock Street La Biere des Amis (Saison; developed in conjunction with Brasserie Thiriez, of the Nord-Pas-de-Calais region of France)
- Dock Street The Truffled Old Ale (English Bitter with winter truffles; Four Seasons Hotel Philadelphia)
- Dock Street Caliente Golden Ale (Belgian Strong Ale with blue agave nectar and chiles; Four Seasons Hotel Philadelphia)
- Dock Street Cherry Verbena Saison (Saison with lemon verbena and cherry puree; Four Seasons Hotel Philadelphia)
- Dock Street Spanglish Fly (Biere de Garde with wormwood, yarrow and ginger; Four Seasons Hotel Philadelphia)
- Dock Street O.P. Yum (Brewed with wheat, oats and pomegranate; Four Seasons Hotel Philadelphia)
- Dock Street Crackle and Squeeze (Saison with Meyer lemons and cracked pink and black pepper; Four Seasons Hotel Philadelphia)
- Dock Street Red Owl Ale (Red Ale; Hotel Monaco)
- Dock Street Philly Tripel (Belgian Ale; Brouwerij Dilewyns)
- Dock Street Little Chicken Pale Ale (Pale Ale; Flightschool)
- Dock Street x Dibruno Truffle Honey Saison (Saison with truffled honey; Di Bruno Brothers)
- Dock Street x Brian Giniewski Guava Lava
- Dock Street x Down the Road Brewing Co. Down the Street
- Dock Street Sticky Wicket for Merion Cricket Club

== Programs and Events ==
Dock Street Philly Beer Week Music Fest is held annually on the last Sunday of Philly Beer Week. The concert is usually outdoors, free to the public and highlights local Philadelphia musicians and artists.

Dock Street Philly Beer Week Run is held annually on the last Sunday of Philly Beer Week, and coincides with the Dock Street Philly Beer Week Music Fest.

In December 2015, the company began the monthly initiative "Rare Beer for School Supplies" as a philanthropic enterprise to collect school supplies and books for West Philadelphia Public schools. Dock Street gives away a glass of a special and rare beer, announced in advance each month, to any adult that brings a donation for the initiative.

== Television and Film ==
In 1993 bottles of Dock Street's Amber Ale were featured in several scenes in the movie Philadelphia.

From 1987-1993, the cast of the U.S. television series Thirtysomething was frequently seen drinking bottles of Dock Street Amber Ale on the show.

On March 28, 2014, the cast of E! News drank and reviewed a bottle of Dock Street Walker on air.

On September 16, 2016, celebrity chefs Michael Symon, Marc Vetri and Jose Garces, along with singer Nick Lachay, tasted Dock Street Bohemian Pilsner on Symon's show Burgers, Brew and 'Que on the Food Network.

In 2017 (and previously, in 2007), the character Mac in It's Always Sunny in Philadelphia wears a shirt advertising the brewery in a season 3 and season 12 episode.

== See also ==
- Barrel-aged beer
- Beer in the United States
- List of breweries in Pennsylvania
