= Colony Meadery =

Meadery in Pennsylvania, U.S.

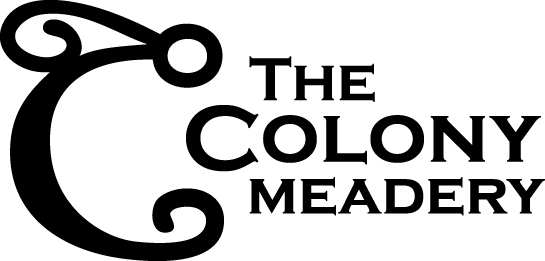
- Location: Easton, PA
- Opened: 2013; 13 years ago
- Owner: Mike Manning; Greg Heller-LaBelle
- Website: www.colonymeadery.com

The Colony Meadery is a meadery founded in Allentown, Pennsylvania, in 2013 before moving to Easton in late 2022. Colony Meadery produces both bottled and canned mead with dozens of different flavors and brands, as well as four different flavors of hard cider.

== History ==
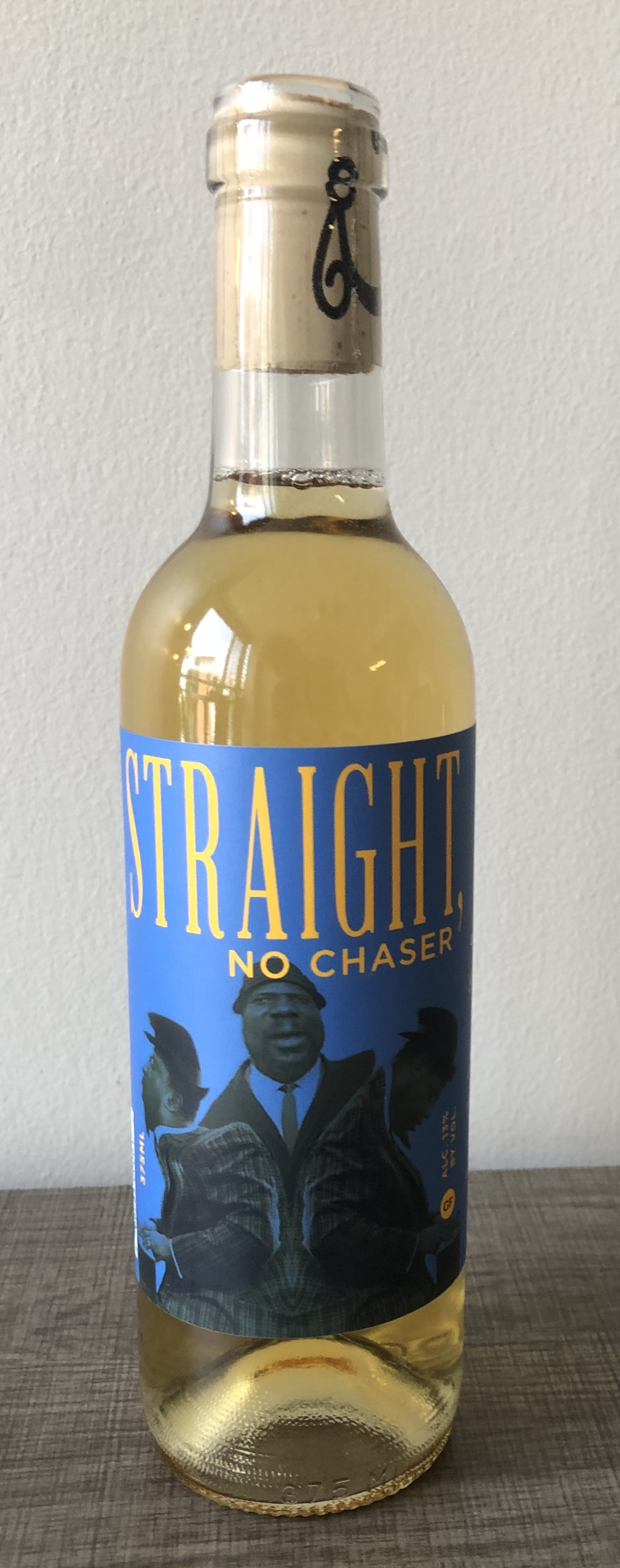
Straight, No Chaser, is the generic, unflavored, mead produced by Colony Meadery

Colony Meadery was founded by Mike Manning and Greg Heller-LaBelle. Manning began brewing craft beer in his basement in 2002 before switching to home-brewed mead in 2008. He met Heller-LaBelle, a craft beer blogger, in 2012 at a beer tasting where he brought his mead. Heller-LaBelle enjoyed the mead so much he convinced Manning to start full time commercial production with him in 2013. When the company was founded it was just one of four Meaderies in the state of Pennsylvania. Colony Meadery brews all their mead in-house with their orange pollinated honey coming from apiaries in South Jersey.

=== Early growth ===
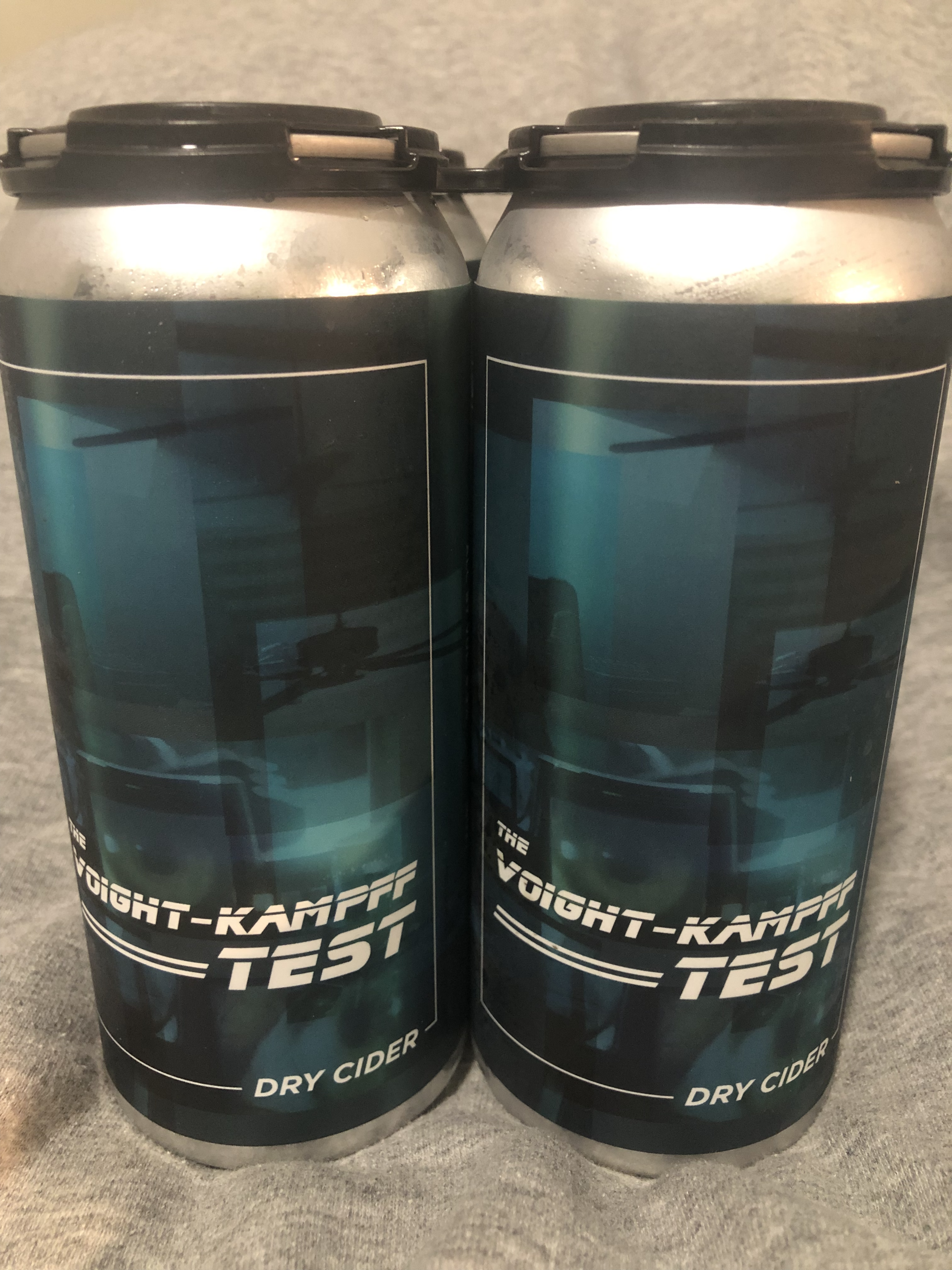
Colony's Voight-Kampff test hard cider, an homage to Blade Runner

Colony Meadery operated out of a Business incubator at 905 Harrison St. in Allentown from 2013 to 2022.

Colony Meadery won the first ever "Commercial Mead Maker of the Year" award at the inaugural "Mead Free Or Die" competition in New Hampshire in 2014.

In 2015 Colony Meadery expanded to include mead slushies.

Colony Meadery has run a series of event promoting Mead throughout the Lehigh Valley in an effort to not just increase their own sales, but also the sales of other meaderies throughout the state. This includes co-sponsoring and attending several local brewery competitions and fairs with out Lehigh valley based brewers. This includes Bethlehem's annual ChiliFest and Lehigh Valley Pride events. Additionally, Colony Meadery regularly participates in events in South Jersey.

The brand is known for producing Philadelphia Sports themed meads. Most famously is the Joel Em-Mead made in 2018 whose can included images of Philadelphia 76ers star Joel Embiid and themed after the shirley temple, Embiid's self proclaimed favorite drink. After launching, the limited run of cans was sold out after just five minutes, and became a permanent menu item due to its popularity.

Colony Meadery opened a second location, a tasting room in South Bethlehem during Musikfest in 2019. The Southside location was made to replace their earlier Bethlehem location in the Moravian Book Shop which operated from 2015 to 2018 before the location was purchased by Moravian College and Colony Meadery was forced to move. The tasting room also sells local craft beers from the Lehigh Valley.

In 2020 Colony Meadery opened a partnership with local animal shelters, including pictures of dogs up for adoption on their cans in an effort to increase pet adoption.

The Meadery hoped to expand into a larger purpose built brewery in 2020, however, the COVID-19 pandemic, and more specifically, Governor Tom Wolf's mandate that all businesses serving alcohol that did not serve food shut down, ended their expansion plans.

=== Weyerbacher Brewing partnership ===
In an attempt to expand their business, and move out of the what was supposed to be temporary business incubator in Allentown, Colony Meadery announced a partnership with Weyerbacher Brewing where they will produce their Mead in their brewery and open a new tasting room on the ground floor. The move to partner with Weyerbacher came after the brewers second bankruptcy in its 25 years of existence and a total shift in the company's direction.
