= NCBC =

NCBC may refer to:

- Namibian Catholic Bishops' Conference
- National Campus Band Competition, Australian live band competition
- National Catholic Bioethics Center
- National Centers for Biomedical Computing, U.S. NIH centers
- National Commerce Bancorporation, a Memphis-based banking company later taken over by SunTrust Banks
- National Commercial Bank (Saudi Arabia) and its investment arm NCB Capital
- Neshaminy Creek Brewing Company, a brewery outside of Philadelphia, Pennsylvania, United States
- New College Boat Club, a rowing club of New College, Oxford, England
- Newnham College Boat Club, a rowing club of Newnham College, Cambridge, England
- Nuclear cap-binding protein complex, RNA binding protein
- National Commission for Backward Classes
