= Dock Creek =

Coordinates: 39.9453°N 75.1434°W

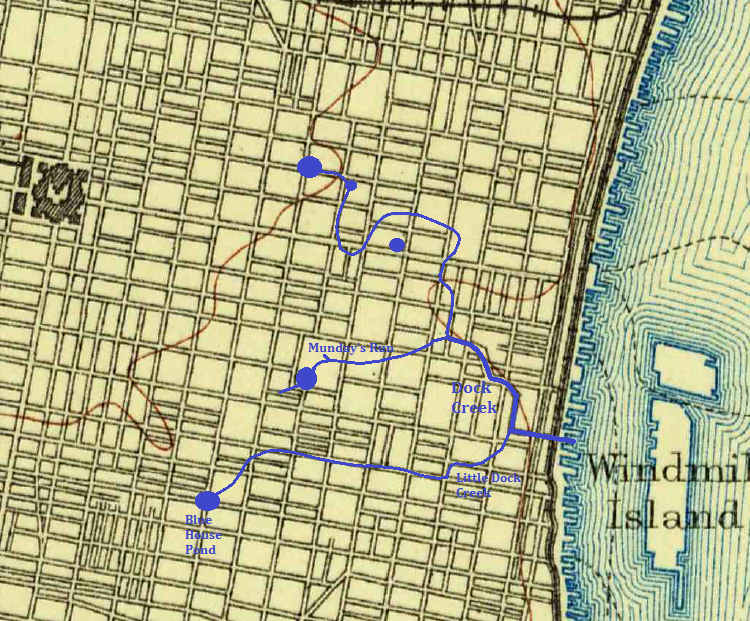
The former course of Dock Creek and its tributaries

Dock Creek was a stream draining much of what is now the eastern half of Center City, Philadelphia, United States. It was a tributary of the Delaware River. By 1820, the entire creek had been covered and converted to a sewer. The present-day Dock Street follows the lower course of the stream.

== Course ==
Called Cooconocon by the native Lenape people, Dock Creek was near the center of William Penn's initial settlement in Philadelphia. The area around the mouth of the creek was marshy, and early Philadelphians referred to it as "The Swamp". The creek's source was near present-day Eleventh Street between Arch and Race. It then flowed through a pond around present-day Fifth and Market streets, after which it flowed south and east. At about Fourth and Chestnut, it was joined by another small stream, Munday's Run. Dock Creek then ran southeast, where it was joined by the Little Dock Creek, and through the swamp to the Delaware River.

== Colonial history ==
Penn thought the mouth of the Dock a good site to dock ships, giving rise to the name. He declared that the area should be a harbor forever, but later inhabitants did not follow his plan. By 1704, a drawbridge was constructed near the mouth of the creek, the first bridge in the colony of Pennsylvania. More bridges followed: at Second Street in 1713, Third Street in 1740, and Walnut Street in 1767. In 1763, the creek's use as an open sewer led residents to describe it as "a Receptacle for the Carcasses of dead Dogs, and other Carrion, and Filth of various kinds, which laying exposed to the Sun and Air putrify and become extremely offensive and injurious to the Health of the Inhabitants." Increased development in the area led settlers to cover the creek above Second Street by 1769. By 1784, it was covered all the way to its outlet at the Delaware.

== Conversion to sewer ==
The mouth of the Dock had become known as "a foul place, especially when the tide was out." The stream became completely buried and served as a sewer for the neighborhood. By the 1840s, the sewer had become inadequate and frequently overflowed into the streets above. Investigators recommended that Philadelphia City Council build a culvert under the streets to carry the stream, which they did. By the 1870s, the Dock Street Market was the city's primary's wholesale produce distribution center until its closure in 1959.

During urban renewal in the 1960s, new sewer lines were constructed in the area, and archaeologists investigated the former site of the city's main waterfront. An art project in 2008 through Philadelphia's FringeArts Festival investigated the former course of Dock Creek between Third and Fifth streets, in what is now Independence National Historical Park.
