= Yards Brewing Company =

Brewery Company in USA

Coordinates: 39.9628°N 75.1354°W

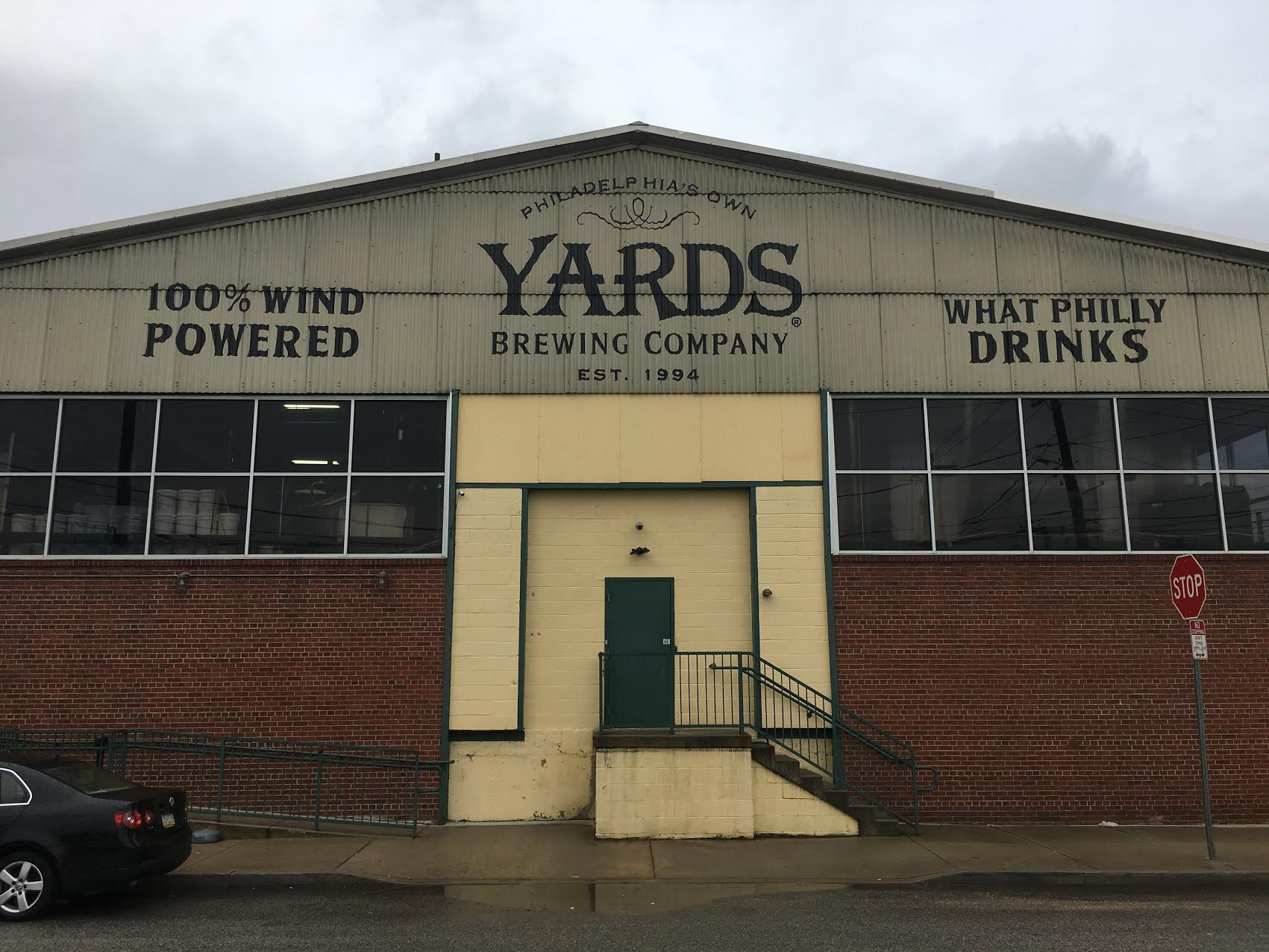
- The former Yards Brewing Company facility on Delaware Avenue in Philadelphia, 2017
- Location: 500 Spring Garden St, Philadelphia, Pennsylvania 19123, U.S.
- Opened: 1994
- Key people: Bill Barton, Nancy Barton, Jon Bovit, and Tom Kehoe
- Annual production volume: 55,000 US beer barrels (65,000 hL) in 2015
- Owner: Tom Kehoe
- Website: yardsbrewing.com

Yards Brewing Company is a craft brewery in Philadelphia, Pennsylvania, specializing in ales, particularly those in the English tradition. In 1994 friends Tom Kehoe and Jon Bovit established Yards after producing their own homebrews since 1988. Within the first few months, "the Yards Guys" were producing one six-keg batch at a time out of their 3.5-barrel brewhouse, and supplying ESA, Entire Porter, and several other cask-conditioned ales to bars. After several partnership changes, Kehoe has continued expanding the Yards brand by moving to larger locations and incrementally increasing the overall output capacity. In 2015, Yards was capable of brewing 55,000 barrels.

== History ==
Yards ESA was first publicly poured at the Philadelphia Craft Beer Festival on April 29, 1995, in booth 406. Dawson Street Pub purchased one of the first ESA kegs from Yards, and offered hand-pumped pours to customers during a happy hour on Friday May 19, 1995. The remaining ESA kegs were self-delivered by Bovit and Kehoe to Khyber Pass, Cavanaugh's 39th Street, and Sugar Mom's.

== Brewery locations ==
The first facility was a garage-sized brewery located at 219 Krams Avenue in Manayunk. By the end of 1996, Yards had grown to a production capability of 795 barrels. In 1997 Yards moved to 5050 Umbria Street in the neighboring section of Roxborough. This larger facility allowed Yards to bottle its beer for the first time, and to contract brew for Manayunk Brewing Company, Dock Street Brewing Company, Barley Creek Brewing Company, and Gravity Brew Co., which has since closed. At the height of this location's production, Yards had brewed 2100 barrels.

Yards Brewing Company moved in 2001 to the old Weisbrod & Hess Brewery in Kensington. Tom Kehoe partnered and signed the lease for this property with Bill and Nancy Barton. At this new location, Yards was capable of brewing 10,000 barrels.

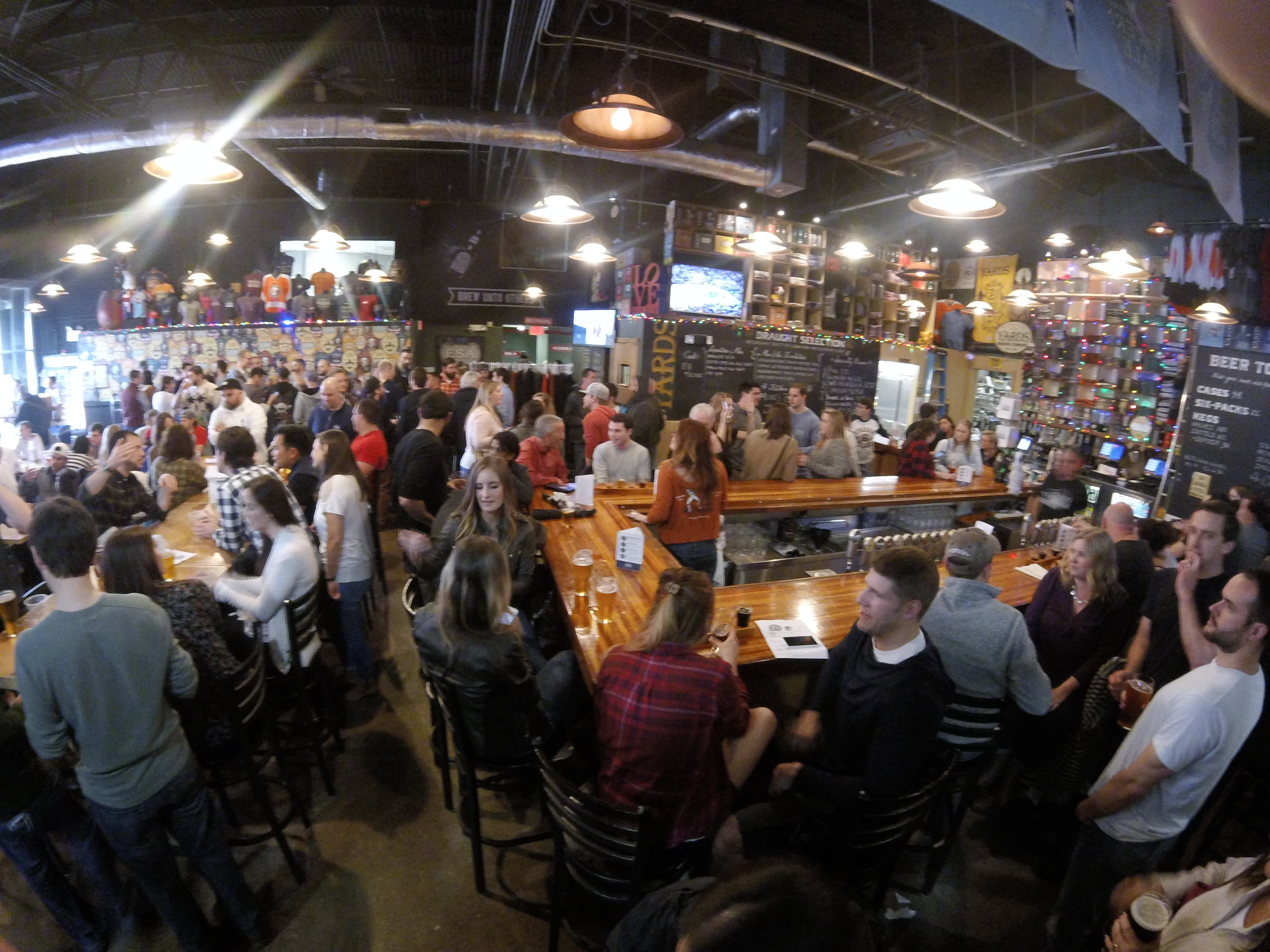
Yards - Northern Liberties Tasting Room

This partnership was short lived, and in 2007 Kehoe and the Barton family split ways. This allowed Kehoe to sign a lease on the current location property located in Northern Liberties. Within the first year at this new location Yards had brewed 6,500 barrels. In 2011 this location became the first brewery in Pennsylvania to be powered entirely by wind through a supplier agreement. It features a 100-person capacity pub-styled tasting room, featuring a 12-tap system, a century old billiards table, and a shuffleboard. That year it achieved status as a "Regional Craft Brewer" by the Brewer's Association and reintroduced the original 3.5 barrel system, "Yards One." As of 2015, the Northern Liberties location reached a capacity of 55,000 barrels and had successfully brewed 41,500 barrels.

Despite the large output capacity, Kehoe desired an even larger facility. In 2016, Kehoe had stated that Yards was looking to move to a location on the 500 block of Spring Garden Street in Philadelphia. Out of the proposed location's 200,000 square feet, Yards' new facility would occupy 80,000 feet. As of March 2017, M&T Bank granted Yards Brewing Company an $8.5 million loan to begin constructing their new 70,000 square foot facility located in the now vacant Destination Maternity headquarters. The estimated cost for the completion of the project is $19 million. The remaining financial backing is reported to be coming from local and state financing. Construction is estimated around $6 million, while equipment is estimated to cost $13 million. Tom Kehoe stated that this "labor of love" would bring "new life to this area of Spring Garden" when it opens. The tentative launch date was set sometime between October and December 2017.

== Ales of the Revolution ==
Yards Brewing Company associate the city of Philadelphia with the country's founding fathers, not only for history's sake, but also as some were brewers themselves. In 1999, Yards launched a collaborative effort with City Tavern, which specializes in recreating 18th century recipes, to lay the foundation of what would become the Ales of the Revolution series. To create this series of history-inspired beers, Yards drew inspiration from brewing recipes originally belonging to George Washington, Thomas Jefferson, and Benjamin Franklin. By 2004, Thomas Jefferson's Tavern Ale and General Washington's Tavern Porter became available year-round. The following year, Yards began developing Poor Richards Tavern Spruce, in an effort to release an Ale of the Revolution for Benjamin Franklin's 300th birthday in 2006.

== Distribution ==
Yards had been a self-distributing brewery, from Kehoe and Bovit's first keg deliveries of ESA to Dawson Street Pub, Khyber Pass, Cavanaugh's 39th St, and Sugar Mom's, until 2008. Yards then partnered with Muller, Inc to begin regional and interstate distribution. Currently, Yards' products are distributed throughout the Mid-Atlantic region with 80% of its nearly 40,000 barrel production being distributed in the Philadelphia tri-state area (Pennsylvania, New Jersey, and Delaware). As of May 2015 Yards is the largest brewery operating in Philadelphia.

== Ownership ==
Friends Jon Bovit and Tom Kehoe had a long-standing history of brewing beers for their friends while in college. After completing a brewery internship with British Brewing Company in Maryland, the duo partnered and signed a lease for the original Manayunk facility. Despite the long-standing history between the two, and the brand gaining recognition, Bovit resigned from the company in 1999. While no longer a financial partner, Bovit is still reported to collaborate on certain brews with Kehoe.

In 2001, Kehoe found new financial and business partners, Nancy and Bill Barton. The trio moved on to open the Kensington location, in the restored Weisbrod and Hess brewery, which allowed Yards to construct a bottling line, and open a tasting room for the general public. Although this partnership only lasted until 2007, the company had gained financial stability, increased brand recognition, and quadrupled the brewery's output capacity. After their formal resignation in July 2007, the Barton family leased the space to Kehoe until he could find a new location for Yards. They then went on to transform their facility into the headquarters of the Philadelphia Brewing Company.

== Products ==
Beer Name	Year Introduced	Style	ABV	IBUs	Availability	Description
Brawler	1998 Reintroduced 2008	English Mild	4.2%	11	Year-round. 6/12/24 pack 1/2 keg, 1/6 keg	Malt-forward, delicately hopped. Hints of caramel and toast.
Cape of Good Hope	2009	West Coast Style Double IPA	9.7%	75	Limited Release: August 4/12-pack 1/6 keg, 1/2 keg	Yearly changing recipe. Notes of citrus, melon, and pine from Ella, Azacca, Galaxy, Mosaic, Citra, Chinook, Citra, and whole flower Cascade hops.
Chocolate Love Stout	2013	Chocolate Stout	6.9%	25	Limited release - December 4/12-pack 1/2 keg, 1/6 keg	Brewed with 100% cacao Belgian dark chocolate. Rich chocolate, dark roasted malts, hints of vanilla and caramel.
Extra Special Ale (ESA)	1995	English Ale	6.0%	47	Year-round. 6/24-pack; 1/2 keg, 1/6 keg Hoff-Stevens cask	British-inspired ale. Subtle spiciness, floral, earthy, and smooth, strong malt backbone. Golden and Styrian hops.
General Washington's Tavern Porter	1999	Porter	7.0%	40	Year-round. 6/12 pack 1/2 keg, 1/6 keg	Brewed with molasses. Dark, smooth, complex. Hints of dried fruit.
Golden Hop IPA	2016	IPA	6.0%	55	Limited Release: January 6/12-pack 1/2 keg, 1/6 keg	Belgian yeasts, dry hopped Amarillo, Cascade, and Mosaic. Melon and citrus taste/aroma.
IBG Grapefruit Pale Ale	2016	Pale Ale	6.1%	N/A	Exclusive Release Philadelphia Independence Beer Garden	Golden-colored pale ale. Grapefruit zest, Azacca, Centennial, and Cascade hops.
IPA	1998	East Coast Style IPA	7.0%	62	Year-round. 6/12/24-pack; 1/2 keg, 1/6 keg Hoff-Stevens cask	Traditional-styled malty IPA, Chinook and Amarillo hops. Pine and Tangerine aroma.
Love Stout	1997	Stout	5.5%	33	Year-round 6/12/24-pack 1/2 keg, 1/6 keg (Nitro only)	Dark roasted malts, notes of chocolate and coffee.
Philadelphia Pale Ale	2000	Pale Ale	4.6%	37	Year-round 6/12/24-pack 1/2 keg, 1/6 keg	Straw-colored pale ale. Cascade, Centennial, Columbus and Simcoe hops. Crisp, hoppy, citrus.
Poor Richard's Tavern Spruce	2005	Spiced Ale	5.0%	22	Year-round 6/12-pack 1/2 keg, 1/6 keg	Influenced by Benjamin Franklin's recipe. Barley, Molasses, and locally sourced spruce clippings.
PYNK	2001 Reintroduced 2013	Fruit Beer	5.5%	6	Limited Release: July 6/12-pack 1/2 keg, 1/6 keg	Light body, sweet and tart cherries and raspberries. Portions of sales go to breast cancer research and awareness.
Rival IPA	2016	West Coast Style IPA	6.2%	55	Limited Release: October 6/12-pack 1/2 keg, 1/6 keg	Crystal and rye malts Bravo and nugget bittering hops. Whole-flowed Chinook hops Centennial, Citra, Simcoe and Columbus hops.
Saison	1996	Saison	6.5%	30	Limited Release: April 6/12-pack 1/2 keg, 1/6 keg	Summer-wheat ale. Belgian yeasts and Styrian hops. Hints of banana, clove, and spice.
Sons of Ben	2014	Belgian Pale Ale	5.0%	37	Limited Release: May 6-pack 1/2 keg, 1/6 keg	Pale straw color. Cascade and Amarillo hops.
Thomas Jefferson's Tavern Ale	1999	Strong Golden Ale	8.0%	42	Year-round 6/12-pack 1/2 keg, 1/6 keg	Based on Thomas Jefferson's recipe. Brewed with oats, maize, rye, wheat, and locally sourced honey.
Washington's Reserve Bourbon Barrel Aged Porter	2014	Barrel Aged Strong Porter	7.0%	34	Limited Release: By batch	General Washington's Tavern Porter, aged for six months inside of bourbon barrels. Crystal and chocolate malts, molasses. Scent of vanilla.

== See also ==
- Barrel-aged beer
