= Society Hill Towers =

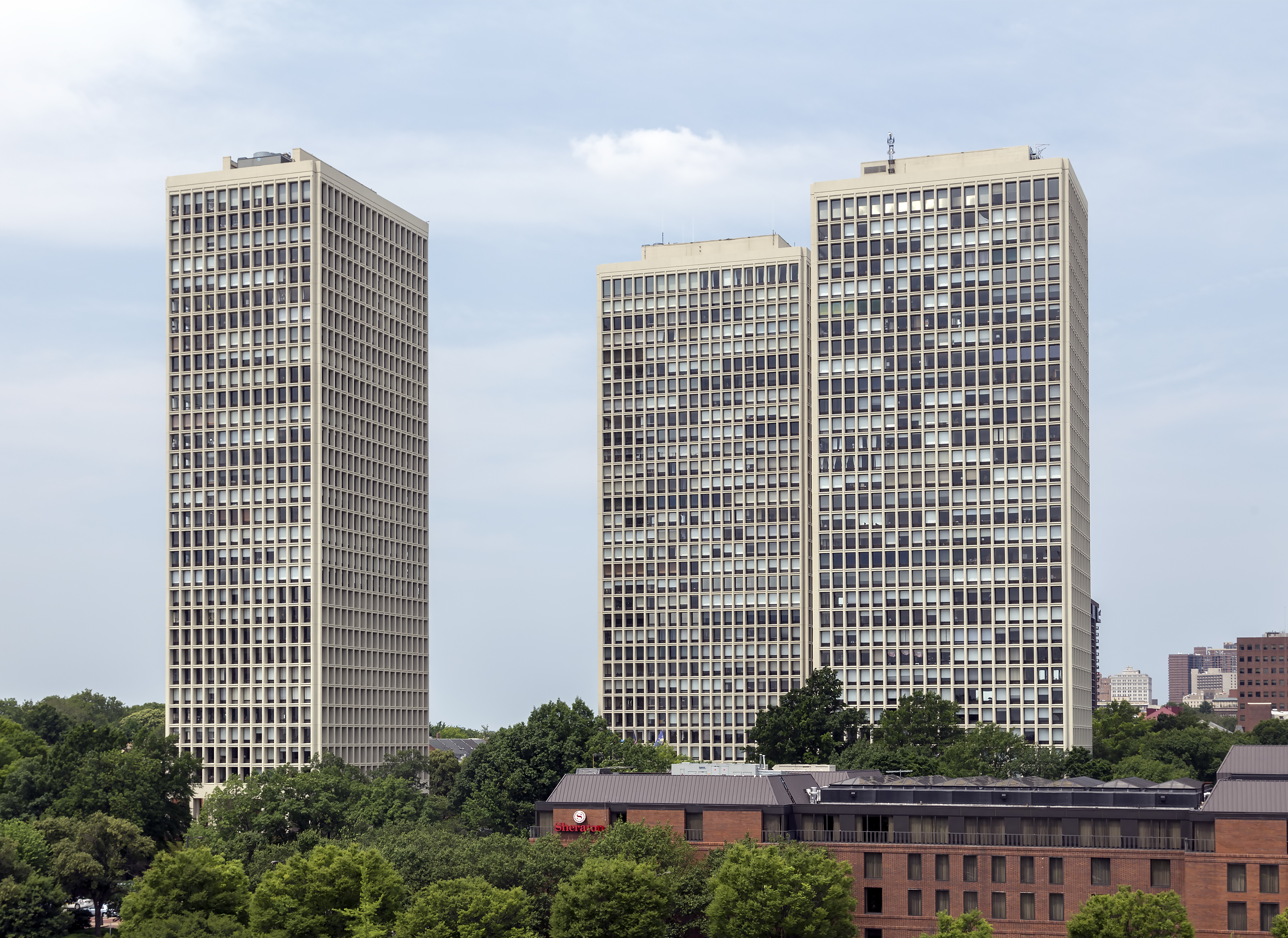
- Society Hill Towers from Penn's Landing in 2016
- Interactive map of the Society Hill Towers area

General information
- Type: Residential
- Architectural style: Brutalist
- Location: 200 Locust Street; Society Hill, Philadelphia, Pennsylvania, United States
- Coordinates: 39°56′44″N 75°08′41″W
- Completed: 1964; 62 years ago
- Inaugurated: October 21, 1964; 61 years ago

Technical details
- Floor count: 32
- Lifts/elevators: 9

Design and construction
- Architect: I. M. Pei and Associates
- Awards: American Institute of Architects: Institute Honor Award; Progressive Architecture Award for Design (1961)
- Designations: Philadelphia Register of Historic Places

The Society Hill Towers are a three-building condominium complex located in the Society Hill neighborhood of Philadelphia, Pennsylvania. The complex contains three 31-story skyscrapers with 624 units on a 5-acre (2.0 ha) site. The towers were designed by I. M. Pei and Associates and are constructed of cast-in-place concrete, with each apartment featuring floor-to-ceiling windows. Completed in 1964, the apartments were originally rental units but were converted to condominiums in 1979.

== History ==
In the late 1950s, Society Hill was considered a slum neighborhood, which was targeted for redevelopment by the Philadelphia City Planning Commission and the Redevelopment Authority. From 1957 to 1959, the Greater Philadelphia Movement, the Redevelopment Authority, and the Old Philadelphia Development Corporation bought 31 acres (130,000 m^{2}) around Dock Street. They relocated and demolished the Dock Street Market, setting aside 5 acres (20,000 m^{2}) of land that would become the Society Hill Towers. In 1957, Edmund Bacon, the executive director of the Philadelphia City Planning Commission, awarded developer-architect firm Webb and Knapp the competition for the redevelopment of Society Hill. Architect I. M. Pei and his team created a plan for three 31-story Society Hill Towers as well as the Society Hill Townhouses, a low-rise project. The Towers and Townhouses project was completed in 1964, while the entire plan was completed in 1977.

The buildings were listed on the Philadelphia Register of Historic Places on March 10, 1999.
