= Philadelphia Brewing Company =

Brewer

- Location: Philadelphia, PA
- Opened: 2007
- Key people: William Barton, Nancy Barton, James McBride
- Website: www.philadelphiabrewing.com

Active beers
Name	Type
Kenzinger	Golden Beer
Walt Wit	Belgian-Style White Ale
Pennsylvania Pale Ale	American Pale Ale
Newbold India Pale Ale	India Pale Ale
Joe Coffee Porter	Porter

Seasonal beers
Name	Type
Fleur de Lehigh	Golden Ale
PHL Session IPA	India pale ale
Schwarzinger	German style black lager

Philadelphia Brewing Company is a brewery founded in July 2007 in the Kensington neighborhood of Philadelphia, USA.

== History ==
Philadelphia Brewing was founded in July 2007 by William Barton, Nancy Barton and James McBride. It is located in the original 1885 building of the Weisbrod & Hess Oriental Brewing Company, which operated on the site until 1939.

The Bartons are former co-owners of Yards Brewing Company. As partners in that company, and on its behalf, they acquired and renovated the brewery facility in 2001. After a dispute with Yards co-founder Tom Kehoe over the future direction of the company, the pair resigned from Yards in 2007. In early 2007, the Bartons struck an agreement with Kehoe to surrender their interest in Yards in exchange for control of its facility. The Bartons were able to retain their entire staff of Yards employees along with the brewing equipment. (Kehoe had Yards products contract brewed at the Lion Brewery in Wilkes-Barre, PA and would later move to a new facility near the Delaware River.) The Bartons and McBride formally launched Philadelphia Brewing Company beers on March 5, 2008.

Two of the company's most popular beers, Kenzinger and Walt Wit, are available on tap at Citizens Bank Park, the South Philadelphia baseball park where the Philadelphia Phillies play.

== Operations ==
The company brews five year-round beers, several seasonal beers and the occasional one-off recipe. It sources ingredients locally, does not use preservatives and operates as its own distributor.

Approximately 85 percent of Philadelphia Brewing Co.'s sales are in the Philadelphia region with an additional 10 percent in the Pittsburgh area. The company's Pittsburgh offices are the former home of Duquesne Brewing Company.

== Products ==
Year-round beers

- Kenzinger (German Pilsner)
- Newbold IPA (American IPA)
- Pennsylvania Pale Ale (American Pale Ale)
- PHL session IPA (American IPA)
- Walt Wit (Witbier)

Seasonal beers

- Fleur de Lehigh (Belgian Pale Ale)
- Joe Coffee Porter (American Porter)
- Kenz O'Lantern (Pumpkin Ale)
- Harvest from the Hood (Fall Seasonal Ale)
- Winter Wünder (Winter Seasonal Ale)
- Shackamaximum (Imperial Stout)
- Kilty Pleasure (Scotch Ale)

Inactive beers

- Broadcaster Brown Ale (American Brown Ale)
- Engine 1892 Market Stout (American Stout)
- Bitter Canadian IPeh? (American IPA)
- BiBerry Ale (Seasonal Fruit Beer)
- Philly'z Navidad (Lager)
- Row House Red (Amber Ale)

== See also ==
- List of breweries in Philadelphia
- List of breweries in Pennsylvania
- Beer in the United States
