= Fort Pitt Brewing Company =

Brewery in Pittsburgh, Pennsylvania, United States

Duquesne Brewing Company
- Location: Latrobe, Pennsylvania
- Opened: 1906 – 1957 2014 – present
- Owned by: Mark Dudash

Active beers
Name	Type
Fort Pitt Ale	(Ale)

Fort Pitt Brewing Company was a major brewery in Pittsburgh, Pennsylvania, from 1906 to 1957, which brewed Fort Pitt Beer and other regional brands. Mark Dudash, a Pittsburgh area attorney and owner of Duquesne Brewing Company, revived Fort Pitt Brewing, and introduced a new Fort Pitt Ale in 2014. The new Fort Pitt Ale is crafted in the spirit of the brewery established in Fort Pitt in 1765, and is formulated as an ale using two row malt, caramel, and English hops. The company had manufacturing plants in Sharpsburg, Pennsylvania and Jeannette, Pennsylvania.

== History ==
=== Beginnings, Prohibition, & Recovery ===
The Fort Pitt Brewing Company was incorporated in 1906 by Dr. Herman Hechelman with a group of businessmen and local politician, Samuel Grenet. With capital stock of $200,000, the company soon began construction of a five-story brewery located in Sharpsburg, PA. Fort Pitt Brewery opened for business in early 1908 with an annual capacity of 75,000 barrels. Fort Pitt Beer's distribution network along with other brands, were established throughout Western Pennsylvania, Eastern Ohio, West Virginia, and Maryland. Prohibition in 1920 caused the vast majority of breweries to close. Fort Pitt Brewing Company, however, remained successfully in business by selling a wide variety of non-alcoholic cereal beverages in 27 states from Massachusetts to California. After the election of Franklin Roosevelt in 1932 which led to the repeal of prohibition laws, Fort Pitt soon brought alcoholic beer back to Pittsburgh. Management initially found that the brewing industry had changed significantly since 1920 based upon many technological advances in the brewing process. However, the economics of selling beer had also drastically changed especially in light of the fact that Fort Pitt was able to thrive on pre-prohibition saloon sales which were 60% of draft beer in bars. As a result of the introduction of steel cans into the market, a growing portion of Fort Pitt sales had increased. Fort Pitt played an increasingly larger role through point of sales signs in bars, supermarkets and liquor stores, outer billboards, newspapers, and eventually commercials on radio and television. In fact, the 1935 US Open Golf Championship held at Pittsburgh's Oakmont Country Club, Fort Pitt printed the admission cards including its logo on each ticket.

In the 1930s, Fort Pitt Brewing Company acquired the Victor Brewing Company in Jeannette, Pennsylvania. A wholesaler receipt from 1936 priced one case of Fort Pitt Brewing Company's beer at $1.65 at that time.

=== Pittsburgh's #1 ===
Selling a record 114,000 barrels of beer in 1935, Fort Pitt soon put itself in a position to dominate the local beer market. However, Samuel Grenet, the company's president for nearly three decades died suddenly of a heart attack at the age of 67. Without Grenet's vision as well as political and personal connections, led Fort Pitt sales to significantly decline to a record low of 86,000 barrels in 1937.

Michael Berardino, with thirty years of experience in the brewing industry, was appointed as the new president. The new management began with an aggressive marketing program in Western Pennsylvania, Eastern Ohio, Western New York, Western Maryland and Northwest West Virginia. By 1940, as a result of additional upgrades and expansion of the plant located in Sharpsburg, the plant's annual capacity increased to 450,000 barrels. The company looked for another existing plant to acquire which it found in Jeannette, PA. Upon the outset of World War II, the company continued to grow and was estimated as the country's 23rd largest brewery.

In 1949, despite competition from national beer brands, Fort Pitt was not only number one in Pittsburgh, but Pennsylvania in total beer sales. The company embarked on another expansion of the Sharpsburg plant costing $3 million. As quickly as the sales had risen, they suddenly dropped off in 1950 to just under 1 million barrels. The sudden decline was blamed on the overall drop in beer sales nationally, an unusually cool summer with less demand for beer, and a regional over supply of beer from the large national brewers.

Fort Pitt remained optimistic that the sales would improve at the beginning of 1952 especially with the release of a new Fort Pitt Pilsener beer. Berardino stated that the beer was reformulated in response to a growing demand for beer with pale, dry and less filling characteristics. Berardino also pointed out that Fort Pitt Beer was one of the nation's largest user of imported hops.

=== 1952 Strike - The Beginning of the End ===
For the most part, Pittsburgh's three largest breweries, Fort Pitt, Duquesne and Iron City had not experienced major labor problems. In April 1952, all 2,100 of the Pittsburgh area brewery workers went on strike. Although all three of the city's major breweries were adversely affected, the most damaging effect was on Fort Pitt. As a result of this extended strike, national beers were once again introduced into the market in an overabundant supply throughout Western Pennsylvania. The end result was that many of the once loyal beer drinkers switched to the national brands on a permanent basis.

According to the prevailing opinion from a local beer tradesman, Fort Pitt's demise was based on a panic in promptly returning the product into the market place ahead of Duquesne and Iron City. All three breweries had significant product warehoused throughout the ongoing labor negotiations between all three local breweries and the unions. While Duquesne and Iron City disposed of all of their outdated product, in stark contrast, Fort Pitt introduced the warehoused beer into the market place in order to take advantage of the pent up demand. Since the beer introduced into the market was spoiled or "skunked", Fort Pitt lost its longstanding #1 spot in sales throughout Pittsburgh to Duquesne and Iron City. Fort Pitt's sales decreased 40% leaving the company with a financial loss for the first time in over a decade.

After the death of Berardino, in August 1957, the company announced it would cease brewing operations at the Sharpsburg plant in order to free more capital to invest in the newly incorporated Fort Pitt Industries. Although it would not be the immediate end of the Fort Pitt brand, the rights were sold to Gunther Brewing Company of Baltimore for 1.3 million dollars, and Gunther Brewing Company acquired the company.

=== The Clock ===
The former Duquesne Brewing Company clock which stands on the Pittsburgh South Side Brew House was originally part of a billboard that stood at the base of Mt. Washington overlooking Carson Street in close proximity to the P&LE Railroad headquarters. The clock had been built by Audichron Company for $12,500.00. The face measured 55’ in diameter and was given a spectacular view of the downtown across the Monongahela River. On July 1, 1938, Fort Pitt President Berardino flipped the switch to turn the lights on for the brand which continued to use the sign for several years before it was rented later by Carling, Ballantine and other companies. In 1960, the clock was purchased by Duquesne Brewing Company and installed on its new brew house where it currently remains today advertising Iron City Beer.

=== Publications ===
Fort Pitt Brewing Company published a 79-page book about baseball titled Aunt Minnie's Scrapbook: Humorous Tales of the Diamond that was authored by Albert Kennedy "Rosey" Rowswell. A date of publication appears to have been omitted.

== 2014 Fort Pitt revival ==
After resurrecting Duquesne Beer in 2010, Mark Dudash, a Pittsburgh native and attorney, obtained ownership of the Fort Pitt name. In the spring of 2014, Dudash will launch Fort Pitt Ale under Fort Pitt Brewing Company. In maintaining its traditional roots in the Western Pennsylvania region, Fort Pitt is crafted in the spirit of the first brewery established by the British Army within the confines of Fort Pitt west of the Alleghenies in 1765. Due to the absence of pure spring water for drinking, beer was generally the preferred beverage for the early pioneers. The heat generated from the brewing process and presence of alcohol served to suppress the growth of contamination bacteria. The brewery supported the troops and settlers until the British Army abandoned the complex in 1772. Fort Pitt is formulated as an ale using two row malt, caramel and English hops, as a recreation of a traditional English ale. Dudash has included the same family of English hops that were transported by the English Army over the mountains of the Allegheny in order to brew the first ale in 1765.

The new Fort Pitt has very few similarities to the beer brewed and packaged in the Jeannette or Sharpsburg plant, but instead recreates the taste which the first settlers of Pittsburgh experienced within the confines of Fort Pitt.

== See also ==
- List of breweries in Pennsylvania
