= Weyerbacher Brewing Company =

Brewery in Easton, Pennsylvania

Coordinates: 40.6735°N 75.2257°W

- Location: Easton, Pennsylvania, U.S.
- Opened: 1995; 31 years ago
- Key people: Dan Weirbach, Sue Weirbach
- Annual production volume: 30,000 US beer barrels (35,000 hL)
- Owned by: Edwin Lozano
- Website: weyerbacher.com

Weyerbacher Brewing Company is a brewery in Easton, Pennsylvania, USA, founded in 1995 by Dan and Sue Weirback. In 2022, after filing for bankruptcy, it was acquired by Savant Beverages LLC.

== History ==
=== 20th century ===
Weyerbacher Brewing was founded in 1995 by Dan and Sue Weirbach. The brewery originally operated out of a repurposed livery stable in downtown Easton, Pennsylvania.

=== 21st century ===
The company's beer grew in popularity, and the company underwent a costly expansion, moving out of their original location to a new 30,000 sqft brewery.

In 2018, Weyerbacher's original brewmaster, Chris Wilson, departed the company for another position at Free Will Brewing.

The same year, Weyerbacher partnered with White Castle to become their exclusive beer partner, which made their beer available on draft at over 400 of its locations until declaraing bankruptcy in 2019.

During the company's expansion, the craft beer market became saturated and its sales fell, leading the company into $2.1 million in debt. In 2019, it filed for Chapter 11 bankruptcy protection.

During the company's bankruptcy proceedings, 1518 Holdings, a Philadelphia-based investment firm, was initially prepared to purchase a 55% majority stake in the brewery.

The investment plan was abandoned, however, and the company's interim leadership group led by Josh Lampe completed the bankruptcy filing, ultimately emerging and resuming production but with a smaller slate of products. Weyerbach opened a second tap house in New Hope in an effort to increase their on-site sales. The debts and restructuring from the transfer hampered production, and the company quickly amassed another $1.5 million of debt.

In June 2022, the company again declared Chapter 11 bankruptcy after production failed to return to its pre-2019 levels.

=== Savant Beverages ===
Following their second bankruptcy, Weyerbacher was purchased by Savant Beverages LLC, owned by Edwin Lozano, a former executive at Miller Brewing Company and a resident of Palmer Township. Lozano purchased the company in part because of their brand recognition as one of the pioneering craft beer producers in Pennsylvania, and the first in the Lehigh Valley region of the state.

The new ownership group entered a partnership with the Colony Meadery to share their large brewery and produce their mead. Lozano is a friend of one of Colony Meadery's co-founders, Greg Heller-LaBelle, who used to run a craft beer blog in the Lehigh Valley before transitioning to mead in 2012. The new ownership group broke with the company's tradition at the brewery and began serving food in-house, which is catered by the nearby Marquee Kitchen.

After opening their tap room with limited hours in December 2022, Weyerbacher held its grand reopening in late January 2023.

The company hosts a 5K run, the Weyerbacher Hill Challenge, where participants are awarded two free beers for signing up.

The company has also increased their participation with other brewers in local Lehigh Valley brewing events.

== Products ==
- Merry Monks: he company's flagship beer, a Belgian tripel ale with an ABV of 9.3%. Merry Monks won a bronze medal at the 2010 World Beer Cup in the Belgian-style tripel category and was named best Belgian beer by Philly Beer Scene magazine in 2010, 2012, 2013, and 2015.
- Tiny: A Belgian Imperial Stout with an 11.8% ABV.
- Last Chance IPA: A balanced, citrus-flavored India pale ale
- Imperial Pumpkin Ale: A seasonal fall beer with an ABV of 8% and flavored to taste like caramel, toasted bread, cinnamon, and nutmeg.
- Rico Guave: A 9% ABV sour ale brewed with pineapple and guava. The beer was designed to taste tropical and tart.
- Warborn Pale Ale: A partnership with the death metal band The Black Dahlia Murder named after the closing track of their third album, Nocturnal. The can featured Bolt Thrower themed artwork by a Warhammer 40k artist, John Sibbick. The beer itself is a dank and piney rye pale ale aged in white oak barrels with an ABV of 5%.
- Paradise 160: An IPA made in collaboration with Cape May Brewing Company and named after the 160 miles that separate Cape May, New Jersey from Easton. Produced with imported hops from New Zealand and Germany, the beer had flavors of white wine, fruit, flowers and lime.
- Jester’s Tale: A divergence from what Weyerbacher usually produces, Jester’s Tale is a vodka produced in collaboration with Triple Sun Spirits. A corn vodka, it's six times distilled, charcoal filtered and gluten free.
- Insanity: Blithering Idiot that is then aged in oak barrels. It has an intense malt profile with hints of vanilla and oak.
- Dallas Sucks: An IPA that was a limited run homage to the Dallas Cowboys released in the lead-up to the 2017 NFL season. A portion of the proceeds where donated to the Hurricane Harvey relief fund. The beer prompted Dallas-based Noble Rey Brewing Co. to release the "Eagle's Tears" Gose, a reference to the Philadelphia Eagles in response.
- Sunday Morning: An American imperial stout aged in Bourbon barrels. It has an ABV of 12.7% and features a darker head with hints of chocolate, roasted malt, vanilla and caramel.
- Blithering Idiot: The company's original Barleywine with 11.1 percent ABV.
- Tarte Nouveau: A “session sour.”
- Line Street Pilsner: A hoppy 5.3% ABV Pilsner.
- Blasphemy: An 11.8% ABV Belgian quadrupel ale aged in bourbon barrels.
- Quad: An 11.8% ABV Belgian-style quadrupel ale.
- 21st anniversary beer: A limited run for the brewery's 21st anniversary, it is an 11.9% ABV chocolate cake flavored stout with bourbon-bacon frosting.
- Riservia: An American wild ale with raspberries.
- Double Simcoe:
- Heathen Imperial Stout
- AutumnFest: The brewery's original seasonal summer beer, it would be retired in 2017.
- Mellow Monks: A 4.5% ABV Belgian-style ale with a golden color and notes of apple, pear and banana.
- Sunday Molé Stout: A Mole themed Stout with flavors of coffee, chocolate, heat and smokiness.
- Berry Monks: A variation of Merry Monks spiced with cranberries, orange peel and ginger.
- Cinnsanity: A variation of Insanity heavily spiced with cinnamon. It pours medium amber-orange and is very murky. Alongside the cinnamon, it is flavored with ginger, bourbon, jammy raisins, graham crackers and apple.
- Crancuddle: A winter seasonal beer spiced with cranberry.
- Decadence: A limited run brew for the tenth anniversary of the brewery with a 13% ABV.
- Old Heathen: An imperial stout.
- Heresy: Barrel aged Old Heathen.
- Prophecy: Barrel aged Merry Monks.
- Harvest Ale: A limited run IPA in 2008 with an ABV of 6.2% with Cascade and Nugget hops grown by the Weirbacks on their family farm.
