= Brasserie Thiriez =

Craft brewery in Esquelbecq, France

Coordinates: 50.884883°N 2.432828°E

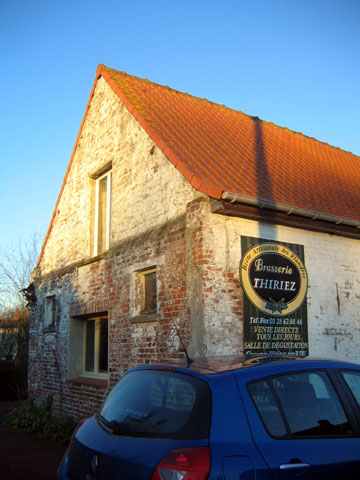
- The Thiriez Brewery building, formerly a historic farmhouse brewery
- Industry: Alcoholic beverage
- Founded: 1996
- Headquarters: 22 Rue de Wormhout, F-59470 Esquelbecq, France
- Products: Beer
- Production output: approximately 850 hL
- Owner: Daniel Thiriez

Brasserie Thiriez is a small craft brewery located in Esquelbecq, a town in the Arrondissement of Dunkirk in the Nord département, in the Hauts-de-France région of France, quite close to the Belgian border. It is situated on the grounds that formerly housed the Poitevin farm brewery, which was active and served the local area until 1945. The current brewery was founded in 1996 by Daniel Thiriez, who had become interested in homebrewing as a college student, and later left his career as a "human resources professional for a large supermarket chain" in the interest of reviving the tradition of the small village brewery. It exports beers in Europe, and the USA.

The brewery's focus is generally on light to medium-colored top-fermented beers with a pronounced hop presence, reflective both of some of the historic beers of the region and the owner's personal preference. There is a tasting room and tap on the brewery premises, at which bottled beer can also be purchased. The products are available in 33cl and 75cl glass bottles, large 2L growlers and on tap.

== Technical Information ==
The Thiriez Brewery began with a small Velo brand brewhouse manufactured in Italy with a capacity of 6 hL per batch, which was installed within the historic farm structure. However, it quickly outgrew this set-up and is now housed in a purpose-built freestanding building on the grounds, in which a larger system with a 20 hL capacity has been installed. To reach the current annual volume, a batch of beer is started approximately 3 times per week during the brewing season.

A two-step infusion mash is typically performed, after which the beers are fermented in one of four cylindro-conical tanks at warm temperatures for up to 7 days, then cold-conditioned for a period of 2–3 weeks, after which they are dosed with sugar and stored in a warm room to naturally carbonate in the bottle or keg. The beers are unfiltered and continue to condition and mature after packaging, although the brewer advises drinking them within one year. English and Czech hop varieties are primarily used, and some of the recipes utilize spices as well.

The distinctive house yeast strain is maintained by a lab in Brussels, and new yeast is typically obtained from them after about 15 uses. In 2007, Wyeast Laboratories commercially released a "French Saison" strain on a limited basis which is widely believed to have been derived from the Thiriez variety. The strain is now available year-round.

== Beers ==
- La Blonde d'Esquelbecq (6.5% ABV)
- L'Ambrée d'Esquelbecq (5.8% ABV) Related to the style of Bière de Garde, this red-amber colored ale is brewed with Pilsener and Munich malts and hopped with Brewer's Gold and Saaz.
- Étoile du Nord (4.5% ABV) A hoppy blonde ale formulated with the participation of John Davidson, an English brewer formerly of the Swale Brewery. Originally titled Frères de la Bière, and currently exported to the USA under the name Thiriez EXTRA. This name was previously spelled XXTRA but was changed in 2007 at the request of Brasserie De Ranke, who felt it was too similarly named to their own XX Bitter. Generously hopped with Bramling Cross. Although the brewery does not cite a specific style as inspiration, reviewers often compare this favorably to an American Pale Ale or Franco-Belgian Saison.
- La Rouge Flamande (5.8% ABV) A reddish ale named for a local Flemish breed of cow.
- La Maline (5.8% ABV) A blackish-brown ale.
- L'Esquelbécoise (5.6% ABV), A blonde beer brewed with wheat as well as barley.
- Bière de Noël (5.8% ABV), A Christmas beer.
- Vielle Brune (ABV varies), Oak-aged versions of Thiriez beers that have ranged from amber to brown in the two batches produced to date.

From time to time and at the brewer's whim, special beers are produced. These have included a Plum Ale and various brews made or labeled for special events or institutions, such as La Bénache, made for the Musée de la Vie Rurale in the town of Steenwerck.
