= Neshaminy Creek Brewing Company =

Brewery

- Interactive map of Neshaminy Creek Brewing Company
- Location: Croydon, Pennsylvania, United States
- Coordinates: 40.085°N 74.902°W
- Opened: June 2010
- Key people: Rob Jahn, Steve Capelli, Jenna Ball
- Annual production volume: 12,000 US beer barrels (14,000 hL) in 2015
- Website: neshaminycreekbrewing.com

Neshaminy Creek Brewing Company is a brewery founded in 2010 in the town of Croydon in lower Bucks County, Pennsylvania, USA. It is considered to be the first production brewery in the county, and borders the city of Philadelphia.

== History ==
Neshaminy Creek Brewing Company was founded in 2010, and is currently owned by Rob Jahn, Steve Capelli, and Jenna Ball. It takes its name from the nearby creek of the same name, from which it draws water for its beer. The facility itself, located at 909 Ray Avenue, officially opened on June 1, 2012. In 2013, the Churchville Lager won a gold medal at the Great American Beer Festival. In 2016, Neshaminy Creek won two bronze medals at the Great American Beer Festival for Churchville Lager and Croydon is Burning. In 2021, Croydon is Burning was awarded a gold medal at the Great American Beer Festival in the category of smoked beer, out of 73 entries. In May 2022, the Warehouse Lager placed first at the World Beer Cup in the "International Pilsener or International Lager" category, out of 231 entries.

Neshaminy Creek has grown exponentially over the years and expanded distribution across Pennsylvania, New Jersey, Delaware, Maryland, and New York. In summer 2020, Neshaminy Creek opened another location inside the Ferry Market located in New Hope, Pennsylvania, where guests can purchase on-site pints and beer to-go.

== Products ==
The company brews several year-round beers and seasonal beers, which are distributed to the greater Philadelphia area and New Jersey.

Year-Round

- The Shape of Haze to Come (Imperial Hazy IPA)
- Warehouse Lager
- Post Up Pils
- The Shape of Hops to Come (Imperial IPA)
- J.A.W.N. American pale ale
- County Line IPA
- Ultracush Hazy IPA

Seasonal

- Churchville Lager
- Hyperdrift DIPA
- Pineapple Shape of Haze to Come (Imperial Hazy IPA)
- Pushing Daisies
- Rita's Fruit Brews - Mango
- Rita's Fruit Brews - Peach Ring
- Summer Dollars
- Wayward Wheat

== See also ==
- List of breweries in Philadelphia
- List of breweries in Pennsylvania
- Beer in the United States
- Barrel-aged beer
