= Dock Street Market =

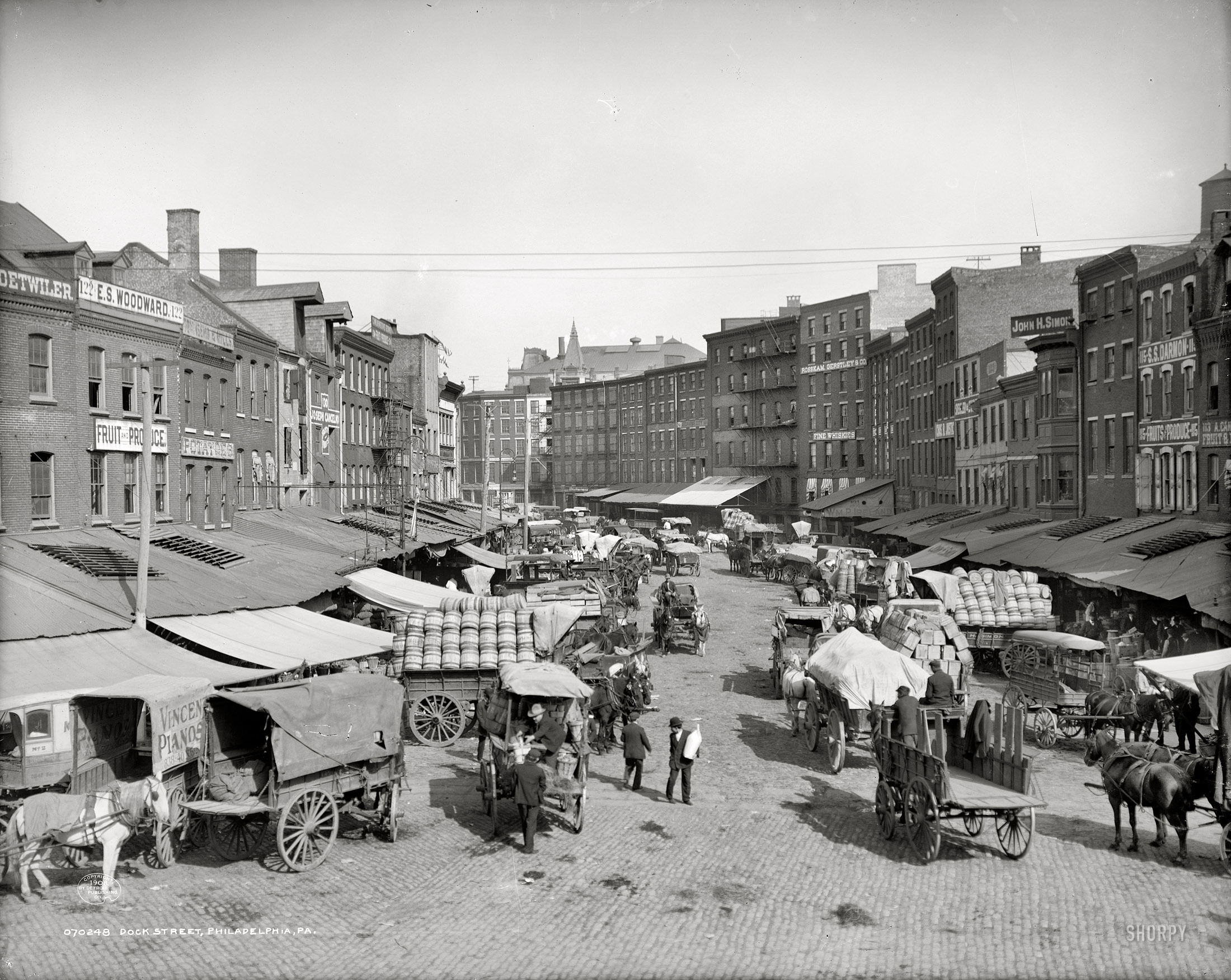
- Dock Street Market in Philadelphia facing north from Spruce Street, c. 1910
- Location: Philadelphia
- Opened: 1870
- Closed: 1959
- Num. of anchor tenants: Over 100

The Dock Street Market was Philadelphia's central wholesale produce market from 1870 until its closure in 1959 and relocation to the Food Distribution Center in South Philadelphia. The Dock Street Market was located on Dock Street in Society Hill. Dock Street is three blocks long, and runs from Sansom Street to Spruce Street, and between Third and Front streets. The market was busiest between midnight and eight in the morning when produce was loaded and offloaded between delivery trucks and warehouses.

== Dock Creek ==
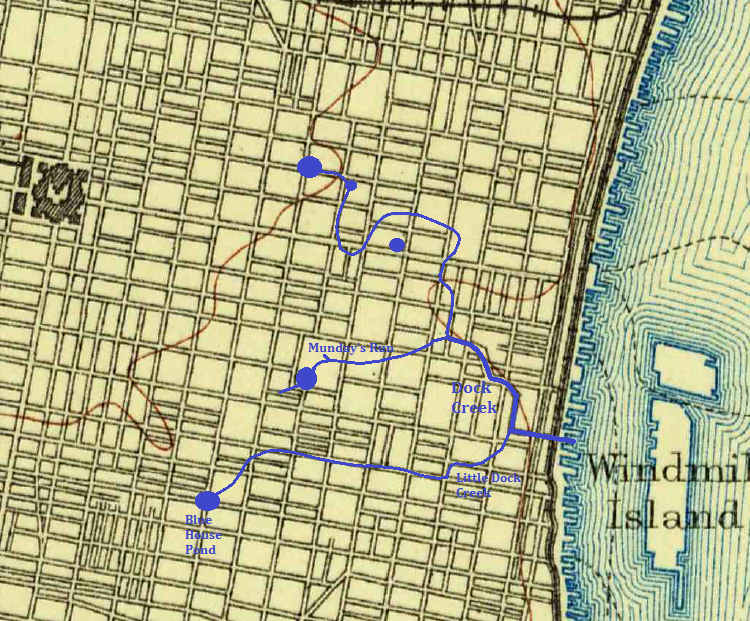
Map showing the former course of Dock Creek and its tributaries in Philadelphia

The area around Dock Creek was first settled in the seventeenth century. William Penn thought the mouth of the creek a good site to dock ships.

Leather tanners had used Dock Creek since the city's early days, both as a water source in which to soak animal hides, and for refuse disposal. Benjamin Franklin and others petitioned to remove the tanners to a more remote part of the city in 1739. The city built a covered sewer with a brick arch, in two stages, in 1765 and 1784. In 1763, the creek was used as an open sewer and described as "a Receptacle for the Carcasses of dead Dogs, and other Carrion, and Filth of various kinds, which laying exposed to the Sun and Air putrify and become extremely offensive and injurious to the Health of the Inhabitants." Residents covered the creek above Second Street by 1769 and Dock Creek was completely covered to its outlet at the Delaware by 1784.

The sewer became inadequate in the 1840s and frequently overflowed to the streets above. The city built a culvert under the streets to carry the stream. During the redevelopment of Dock Street in the 1960s, new sewer lines were constructed in the area and archaeologists investigated the site.

Dock Street continues to run on top of the old stream bed.

== 1870-1959 ==
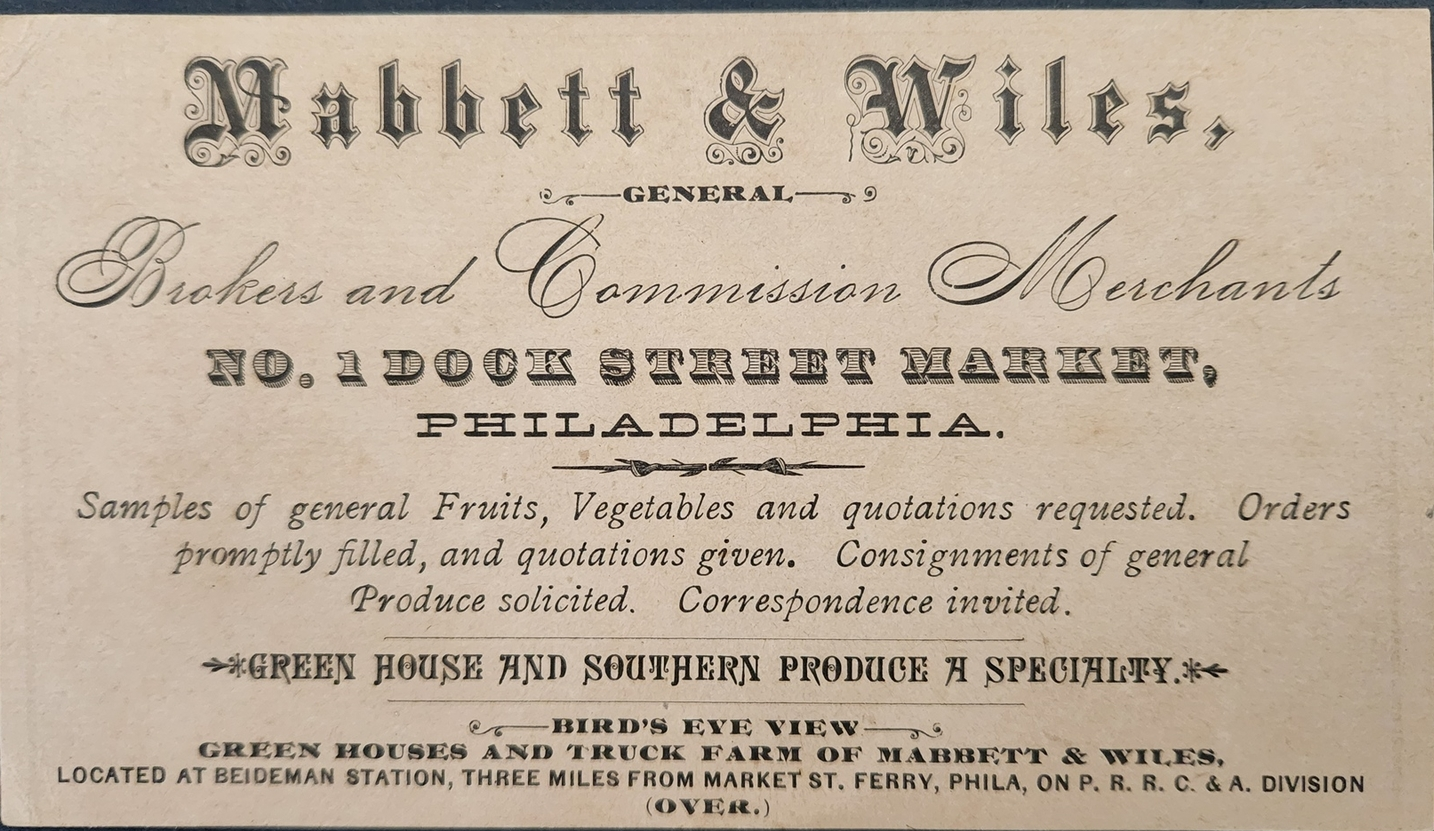
1876 advertising card for "Mabbett & Wiles, General brokers and commission merchants, No. 1 Dock Street Market, Philadelphia"

In June 1842, Philadelphia's municipal council referred to the Committee on Police a proposal, "asking that the stands for Market Wagons, vending their produce, may be changed from [Second street, between Chestnut and High streets] to Dock street, between Second and Front."

The advent of motor trucks between 1918 and 1920 opened the Dock Street market to growers in South Jersey.

In 1958, Dock Street was one of four major produce markets in Philadelphia alongside the Callowhill Street Market, the Baltimore and Ohio Produce Terminal (used for auction sales only), and the Pennsylvania Railroad.

== Move to South Philadelphia ==
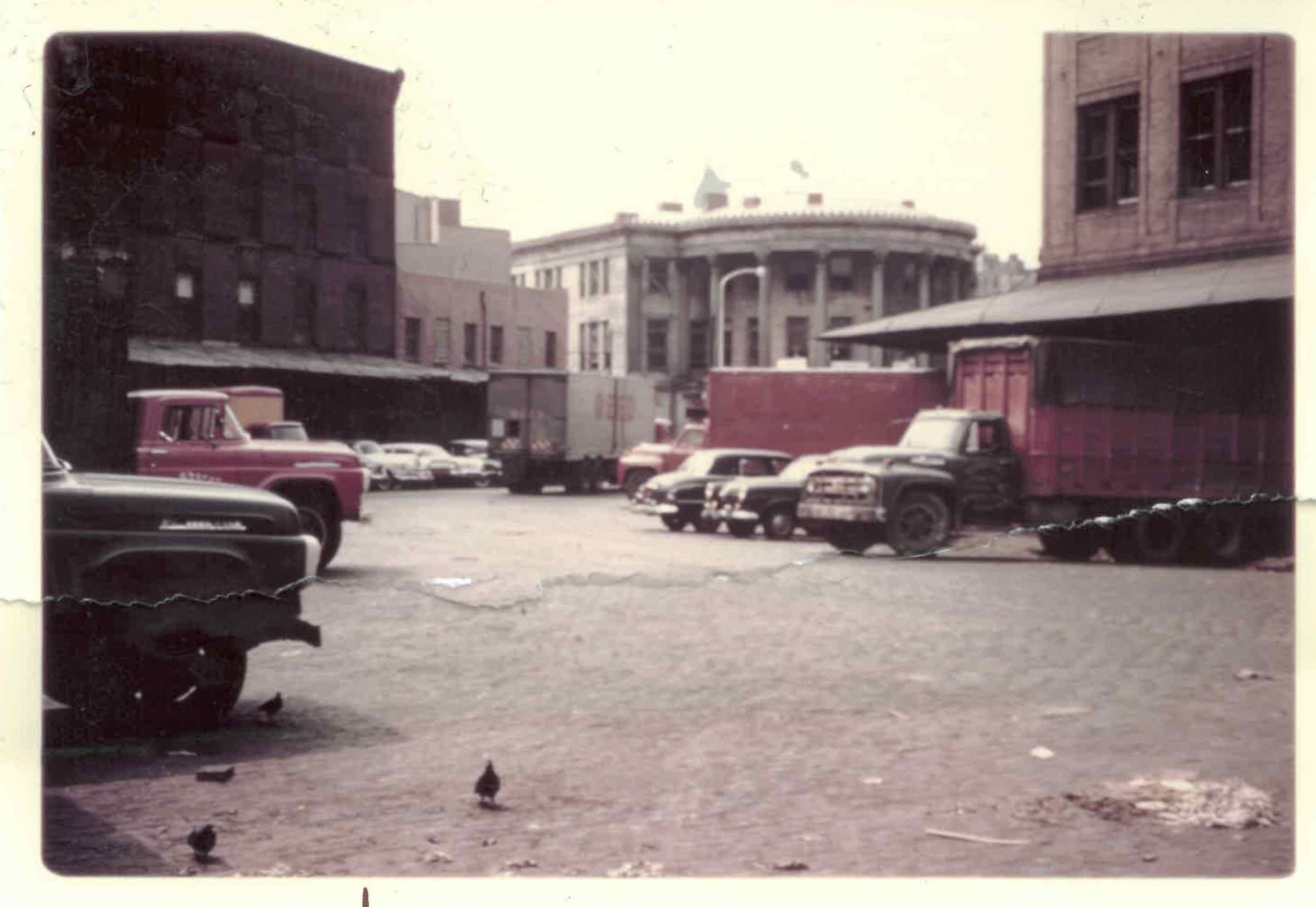
View of Merchants' Exchange Building from 214 Dock Street in late 1950s.

In the late 1950s, Society Hill was considered a slum neighborhood, and the market had come to be known for its congestion and noise in the early morning hours, and the infestation of vermin that fed on the discarded produce. Edmund Bacon, city planning director, convinced the city to spend $17 million to acquire land and invest in infrastructure. The United States Department of Agriculture had published a study in 1951 supporting the move of the market to Delaware and Oregon avenues in South Philadelphia. The Philadelphia City Planning Commission and the Redevelopment Authority targeted Society Hill including the market. From 1957 to 1959, the Greater Philadelphia Movement, the Redevelopment Authority and the Old Philadelphia Development Corporation bought 31 acres (130,000 m^{2}) around Dock Street. They relocated and demolished the Dock Street market, setting aside 5 acres (20,000 m^{2}) of land that would become the Society Hill Towers.

In June 1959, the Dock Street Market merchants moved to the new Food Distribution Center on South Galloway Street in South Philadelphia.

The move from Dock Street to the Food Distribution Center in 1959 changed the structure of the wholesale produce market by centralizing distribution through a fewer number of larger wholesalers. Alfred Joseph Burns wrote in 1968,

Most of the 1958-64 decline in the number of wholesalers was among small firms. In 1958 there were 117 small firms handling less than 3,000 tons of produce a year, 35 medium-sized firms handling from 3,000 to 7,500 tons, and 55 large firms handling over 7,500 tons. In 1964 there were 64 small, 39 medium-sized, and 51 large firms.

== Historiography ==
An art project in 2008 investigated the former course of Dock Creek between Third and Fifth streets, in what is now Independence National Historical Park.

The Dock Street Market was the subject of "Hucksters: The Tumult of Dock Street" at the Independence Seaport Museum in 2015.
