= Meadery =

Producer of honey wines or meads

A meadery is typically a dedicated winery which is a producer of mead, or honey wine but may also be produced by a winery or brewery, which sells them commercially. There are craft meaderies emerging all over North America, Canada, Australia and New Zealand where each meadery produces various styles of meads, such as fruit meads, traditional meads, session meads, and braggots (mead-beer hybrids).

Meaderies are becoming more commonplace around the world as people start to discover their offerings. Meaderies that produce honey wines or meads are becoming more abundant in the US. According to a study by the American Mead Maker Association, the community of mead producers has exploded 130% since 2011, making it the fastest growing alcoholic beverage category in the US.

In the United Kingdom, particularly in Cornwall, a meadery can also refer to a type of restaurant that serves mead and food with a medieval ambience. An ancient meadery is thought to be in the style of a banquet hall, having wooden flooring, heavy wooden tables, and lit by candlelight with white-painted granite walls.

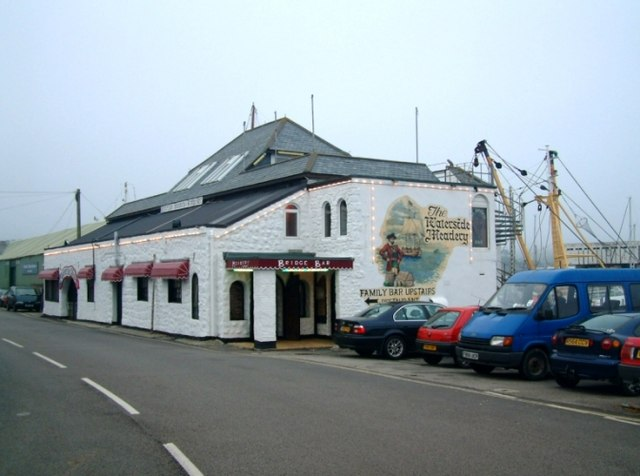
The Waterside Meadery, Penzance
